= Teresa Teng singles discography =

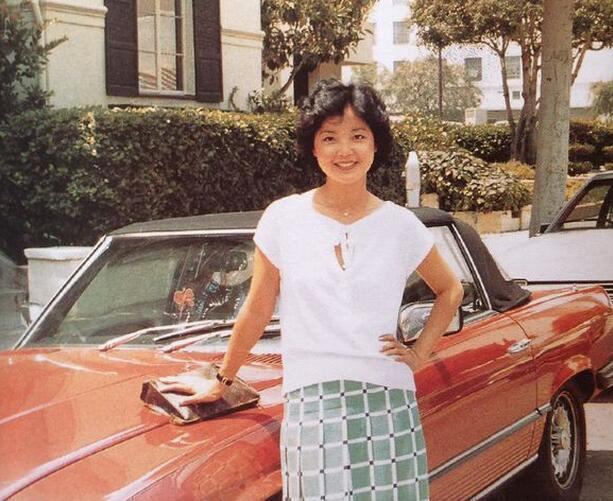
- Teng in 1980
- Mandarin singles: 21
- Japanese singles: 31
- Cantonese singles: 3

The discography of Taiwanese singer Teresa Teng contains over 70 studio albums recorded in multiple languages, including Mandarin Chinese, Cantonese, and Japanese. Many of her singles have been recorded in both Mandarin Chinese and Japanese with different titles. In 1995, Shirley Kwan recorded a dream pop rendition of Teng's 1980 Cantonese single "Forget Him" (忘記他), which was featured in the Wong Kar-wai's film Fallen Angels.

In 1997, "Toki no Nagare ni Mi o Makase" was ranked number 16 in a survey of the 100 greatest Japanese songs of all time conducted by Japan Broadcasting Corporation (NHK). In 1999, "The Moon Represents My Heart" was ranked number one in a poll of the 10 best Chinese classics of the 20th century by Radio Television Hong Kong (RTHK). At the 2010 Chinese Music Awards, the same song was ranked first amongst the greatest Chinese musical works of the past 30 years. In 2011, it was named the greatest work of the 20th century at the Golden Melody Awards.

== Mandarin singles ==
List of Mandarin singles released under Polydor / Kolin Records, with year, and associated album
Title	Year	Album
"Goodbye My Love"	1975	Goodbye My Love
"Thinking of You Tonight" (今夜想起你)	1976	Drizzle of Tears
"Light Rain" (絲絲小雨)	1977	Light Rain
"The Moon Represents My Heart" (月亮代表我的心)	1977	Love in Hong Kong
"See the Chimney Smoke Rise Again" (又見炊煙)	1978	Let Love Be More Beautiful
"A Love Letter" (一封情書)	1978	A Love Letter
"When Will You Return?" (何日君再來)	1978	A Love Letter
"Small Town Story" (小城故事)	1979	Small Town Story
"Spring in the North" (北國之春 / 我和你)	1979	Small Town Story
"Tian Mi Mi" (甜蜜蜜)	1979	Tian Mi Mi
"Zai Shui Yi Fang" (在水一方)	1980	Zai Shui Yi Fang
"Ni Zenme Shuo" (你怎麼說)	1980	Zai Shui Yi Fang
"A Small Wish" (一個小心願)	1980	A Small Wish
"Yuan Xiangqing Nong" (原鄉情濃)	1980	Yuan Xiangqing Nong
"If I Were for Real" (假如我是真的)	1981	If I Were for Real
"Love is Like a Song" (愛像一首歌)	1981	Love is Like a Song
"Shuishang Ren" (水上人)	1981	Shuishang Ren
"Wishing We Last Forever" (但願人長久)	1983	Dandan Youqing
"Messengers of Love" (愛的使者)	1984	Messengers of Love
"Changhuan" (償還)	1985	Changhuan
"I Only Care About You" (我只在乎你)	1987	I Only Care About You

== Japanese singles ==
List of Japanese singles, with year released, chart positions, sales, certifications, and album
Title	Year	Peak chart positions	Sales	Certifications	Album
Title	Year	JPN	Sales	Certifications	Album
"Konyakashira Ashitakashira" (今夜かしら明かしら)	1974	—			Kūkō / Yukigesho
"Airport" (空港)	1974	29	Asia: 750,000		Kūkō / Yukigesho
"Yukigesho" (雪化粧)	1974	41			Kūkō / Yukigesho
"Onna no Ikigai" (女の生きがい)	1975	—			Yoruno Jokyaku / Onna no Ikigai
"Yoruno Jokyaku" (夜の乗客)	1975	—			Yoruno Jokyaku / Onna no Ikigai
"Acacia no Yume" (アカシアの夢)	1975	—			Acacia no Yume
"Yoruno Ferryboat" (夜のフェリーボート)	1976	—			Acacia no Yume
"Furusato wa Doko Desuka" (ふるさとはどこですか)	1977	42			Furusato wa Doko Desuka
"Anata to Ikiru" (あなたと生きる)	1977	—			Anata to Ikiru
"Tokyo Yakei" (東京夜景)	1978	—			Nessho! Tokyo Yakei
"Anata / Magokoro" (你（あなた）/ まごころ)	1980	—			Anata / Magokoro
"Jerusomina no Aruita Michi" (ジェルソミーナの步いた道)	1981	—			Jerusomina no Aruita Michi
"Futatabi no" (ふたたびの)	1983	—			Tabibito
"Tsugunai" (つぐない)	1984	6	Asia: 1,500,000		Tsugunai
"Aijin" (愛人)	1985	10	Asia: 1,500,000	RIAJ: Gold (digital)	Aijin
"Toki no Nagare ni Mi o Makase" (時の流れに身をまかせ)	1986	6		RIAJ: Platinum (digital)	Toki no Nagare ni Mi o Makase
"Scandal" (スキャンダル)	1986	—			Toki no Nagare ni Mi o Makase
"Wakare no Yokan" (別れの予感)	1987	16		RIAJ: Gold (digital)	Wakare no Yokan
"Koibito Tachi no Shinwa" (戀人たちの神話)	1988	44			Roman Shugi
"Hong Kong" (香港)	1989	—			Roman Shugi
"Kanashii Jiyuu" (悲しい自由)	1989	—			Roman Shugi
"Namida no Jouken" (涙の條件)	1990	—	JPN: 150,000		90 Best Collection
"Kanashimi to Odorasete" (悲しみと踴らせて)	1991	—			91 Kanashimi to Odorasete; ~New Original Songs~
"Aino Hizashi (Amore Mio)" (愛の陽差し～アモーレ・ミオ～)	1992	—			Best Selection 92
"Yunagi / Banshu" (夕凪 / 晩秋)	1992	—			Aijin
"When Will You Return?" (何日君再來)	1993	—			Best Songs - Single Collection
"Anata to Tomoni Ikiteyuku" (あなたと共に生きてゆく)	1993	—	JPN: 50,000		Zenkyoku-shū - Anata to Tomoni; Ikiteyuku
"Yaraika" (夜來香)	1994	—			Zenkyoku-shū'95 - Yaraika
"Kanashii Jiyuu" (悲しい自由 (Remake Single))	1996	—			Non-album singles
"Soshite...Meguriai" (そして…めぐり逢い) (with Hiroshi Itsuki)	1996	—			Non-album singles
"Yume Tachinu / Wǒ Zhǐ Zàihū Nǐ" (夢立ちぬ / 我只在乎你)	1997	—			Zenkyoku-shū'98 - Yume Tachinu

=== Special singles ===
List of Japanese special singles
Title	Year	Album
"Haru wo Matsu Hana / Honkon no Torui" (春を待つ花 / 香港の夜)	1986	Chugokugo Zenkyoku-shū (中国語 全曲集)
"Au Tokiwa Itsumo Tanin / Tokyo Yakei" (逢う時はいつも他人 / 東京夜景)	1986	Chugokugo Zenkyoku-shū (中国語 全曲集)
"Kūkō / Yoruno Ferryboat" (情人的關懷 (空港) / 你在我心中 (夜のフェリーボート))	1986	Chugokugo Zenkyoku-shū (中国語 全曲集)

== Cantonese singles ==
List of Cantonese singles, with year released, and associated album
Title	Year	Album
"Wind and Frost Accompany Me" (風霜伴我行)	1980	Irreconcilable
"Forget Him" (忘記他)	1980	Irreconcilable
"Strolling Down the Road of Life" (漫步人生路)	1983	Strolling Down the Road of Life
