= Teresa Teng albums discography =

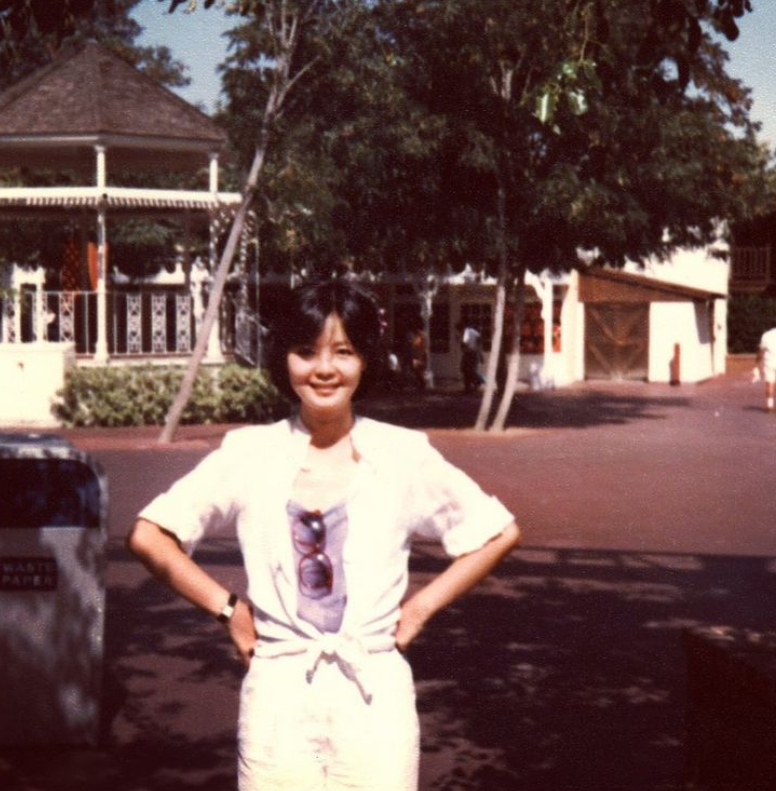
- Teng in 1980
- Studio albums: 76
- EPs: 1
- Compilation albums: 130

The discography of Taiwanese singer Teresa Teng contains over 70 studio albums recorded in multiple languages, including Mandarin Chinese, Cantonese, and Japanese. Teng has sold over 48 million albums as of 2010 (excluding mainland China) according to the International Federation of the Phonographic Industry (IFPI).

In 1984, IFPI Hong Kong recognized Teng as the artist with most platinum-certified albums among all singers in Hong Kong. She was awarded a special medal by PolyGram Hong Kong in 1985 for having sold more than 5 million copies in the territory with all of her albums since 1975. By 1988, the IFPI Hong Kong had certified seventeen of her albums as platinum, making her the artist with the second most platinum albums of all time, only behind Alan Tam.

== Mandarin Chinese albums ==
=== Studio albums ===
List of studio albums released under Yeu Jow, Hai Shan, and Life Records
Title	Year	Label
Feng Yang Hua Gu (鳳陽花鼓)	1967	Yeu Jow Records
Xinteng de Xiao Baobao (心疼的小寶寶)	1967	Yeu Jow Records
Heihei a Gege (嘿嘿阿哥哥)	1967	Yeu Jow Records
Biyi Niao (比翼鳥)	1968	Yeu Jow Records
Changyin Yibei (暢飲一杯)	1968	Yeu Jow Records
Yijian Ni Jiu Xiao (一見你就笑)	1968	Yeu Jow Records
Di Qi Ji (第七集)	1968	Yeu Jow Records
Di Jiu Ji (第九集)	1968	Yeu Jow Records
Shengdan Kuaile – Jing He Xinxi (聖誕快樂‧敬賀新禧)	1968	Yeu Jow Records
Zai Hui Ba! Shiqi Sui (再會吧！十七歲)	1968	Yeu Jow Records
Di Shier Ji; Twelfth Album (第十二集)	1969	Yeu Jow Records
Xiexie Zong Jingli (謝謝總經理)	1969	Yeu Jow Records
Hua de Meng / Tan Qing Shihou (花的夢／談情時候)	1970	Yeu Jow Records
Lian Ai de Lu Duome Tian (戀愛的路多麼甜)	1970	Yeu Jow Records
Meigui Guniang (玫瑰姑娘)	1970	Yeu Jow Records
Miren de Xiaojie (迷人的小姐)	1970	Yeu Jow Records
X+Y Jiushi Ai (X+Y就是愛)	1971	Yeu Jow Records
Hebi Liu Xia Huiyi / He Chu Shi Wo Guicheng (何必留下回憶／何處是我歸程)	1971	Yeu Jow Records
Wo de Aiqing Xiang Xingxing – Shui Lai Tongqing Wo (我的愛情像星星-誰來同情我)	1971	Hai Shan Records
Teresa Teng Hongdong Minnan Yu Gequ (鄧麗君轟動閩南語歌曲)	1971	Hai Shan Records
Kuaile de Qiaqia Guniang (快樂的恰恰姑娘)	1971	Hai Shan Records
Aiqing 1, 2, 3 / Taibei Guniang (愛情1，2，3 / 台北姑娘)	1971	Life Records
Deng Lijun Zhi Ge (鄧麗君之歌)	1971	Life Records
Nanwang de Chulian Gingren/ Mai Rou Zong (難忘的初戀情人 / 賣肉粽)	1971	Life Records
Dang Wo Yijing Zhidao Ai / Na Nu Wa Qingge (當我已經知道愛 / 娜奴娃情歌)	1972	Life Records
Shaonian Ai Guniang / Shui Shi Xinshangren (少年愛姑娘 / 誰是心上人)	1973	Life Records
Bei Ai Di Meng (悲哀的夢)	1973	Life Records
Di Yi Ci Jian Dao Ni / Qing Hua (第一次見到你 / 情花)	1973	Life Records
Qingshan Lu Shui Wo He Ni (青山綠水我和你)	1974	Life Records
Meiyou Ai Zenme Huo / Yong Xiangai (沒有愛怎麼活 / 永相愛)	1975	Life Records
Xinzhong Xihuan Jiu Shuo Ai / Wo Jiushi Ai Ni (心中喜歡就說愛 / 我就是愛你)	1976	Life Records
1976 Nan You Teji: Feng de Chuanshuo (1976南游特輯：風的傳說)	1976	Life Records

List of studio albums released under Polydor Records and Kolin Records
Title	Album details	Certifications
Love Songs of the Island: Goodbye My Love (島國之情歌: 再見, 我的愛人)	Released: September 10, 1975; Label: Polydor Records; Formats: LP, cassette	
Love Songs of the Island, Vol. 2: Drizzle of Tears (島國之情歌第二集: 今夜想起你／淚的小雨)	Released: April 1, 1976; Label: Polydor Records; Formats: LP, cassette	IFPI HK: Platinum
Love Songs of the Island, Vol. 3: Light Rain (島國之情歌第三集: 絲絲小雨)	Released: July 8, 1977; Label: Polydor Records; Formats: LP, cassette	IFPI HK: Gold
Love Songs of the Island, Vol. 4: Love in Hong Kong (島國之情歌第四集: 香港之戀)	Released: December 19, 1977; Label: Polydor Records, Kolin Records; Formats: LP, cassette	IFPI HK: Platinum
Love Songs of the Island, Vol. 5: Let Love Be More Beautiful (島國之情歌第五集: 使愛情更美麗)	Released: September 21, 1978; Label: Polydor Records, Kolin Records; Formats: LP, cassette	IFPI HK: Platinum
A Love Letter (一封情書)	Released: December 21, 1978; Label: Polydor Records; Formats: LP, cassette	IFPI HK: Platinum
Tian Mi Mi (甜蜜蜜)	Released: November 15, 1979; Label: Polydor Records; Formats: LP, cassette	IFPI HK: Platinum
Zai Shui Yi Fang (在水一方)	Released: February 12, 1980; Label: Polydor Records, Kolin Records; Formats: LP, cassette	IFPI HK: Platinum
A Small Wish (一個小心願)	Released: June 26, 1980; Label: Polydor Records, Kolin Records; Formats: LP, cassette	
Yuan Xiangqing Nong (原鄉情濃)	Released: October 10, 1980; Label: Polydor Records; Formats: LP, cassette	IFPI HK: Platinum
Love Songs of the Island, Vol. 7: If I Were for Real (島國之情歌第七集: 假如我是真的)	Released: April 2, 1981; Label: Polydor Records; Formats: LP, cassette	IFPI HK: Gold
Love is Like a Song (愛像一首歌)	Released: July 22, 1981; Label: Polydor Records; Formats: LP, cassette	IFPI HK: Gold
Shuishang Ren (水上人)	Released: December 4, 1981; Label: Polydor Records; Formats: LP, cassette	IFPI HK: Gold
Dandan Youqing (淡淡幽情)	Released: February 2, 1983; Label: Polydor Records; Formats: LP, cassette, CD	IFPI HK: Platinum
Love Songs of the Island, Vol. 8: Messengers of Love (島國情歌第八集: 愛的使者)	Released: June 1984; Label: Polydor Records; Formats: LP, cassette, CD	
Changhuan (償還)	Released: August 19, 1985; Label: Polydor Records; Formats: LP, cassette, CD	IFPI HK: Platinum
I Only Care About You (我只在乎你)	Released: April 1, 1987; Label: Polydor Records; Formats: LP, cassette, CD	IFPI HK: Gold

=== Compilation albums ===
Title	Album details	Certifications
Cai Hong Ling, Qianyan Wan Yu (採紅菱, 千言萬語)	Released: 1970; Label: Yeu Jow Records	
Zuoye Meng Xing Shi (昨夜夢醒時)	Released: 1970; Label: Yeu Jow Records	
Quan Shi Ge (勸世歌)	Released: 1970; Label: Yeu Jow Records	
Jishi Zai Huitou (幾時再回頭)	Released: April 1971; Label: Life Records	
Denglijun Changxiao Gequ Di Yi Ji (鄧麗君暢銷歌曲第一集)	Released: August 1975; Label: Polydor Records	
Teresa Teng's Golden Hits (鄧麗君金唱片)	Released: 1977; Label: Polydor Records	IFPI HK: Platinum
Greatest Hits	Released: 1977; Label: Polydor Records	
Greatest Hits Vol. 2	Released: May 1978; Label: Polydor Records	
Greatest Hits Vol. 3	Released: 1982; Label: Polydor Records	IFPI HK: Platinum
Best of 15 Years (鄧麗君十五週年)	Released: October 1983; Label: Polydor Records	IFPI HK: Platinum
Leishe Daoguo Qingge Jingxuan Denglijun (鐳射島國情歌精選 鄧麗君)	Released: 1984; Label: Polydor Records	
Mingqu Xuan (名曲選)	Released: 1985; Label: Polydor Records	
Huaijiu Mingqu Xuan (懷舊名曲選)	Released: 1986; Label: Polydor Records	
Huaijiu Mingqu Xuan Di Er Ji (名曲選第二輯)	Released: 1986; Label: Polydor Records	
Nan Wan De Teresa Teng (難忘的 Teresa Teng)	Released: 1992; Label: Polydor Records	

=== Soundtrack albums ===
Title	Album details	Certifications
Feng Cong Na Li Lai (風從那裡來 / 月下送君)	Released: 1972; Label: Lee Fung Records	
Everybody Is Laughing (天下一大笑)	Released: December 22, 1972; Label: Lee Fung Records	
The Young Ones (彩雲飛)	Released: October 1973; Label: Life Records	
Rhythm of the Wave (海韻)	Released: January 1974; Label: Lee Fung Records	
Shui Lianyi / You Shui Zhidao Wo (水漣漪 / 有誰知道我)	Released: February 1974; Label: Lee Fung Records	
First Come, First Love (近水樓台)	Released: 1975; Label: Lee Fung Records	
My Funny Intern (鬼馬俏醫生)	Released: August 4, 1976; Label: Life Records	
Love Songs of the Island, Vol. 6: Small Town Story (島國情歌第六集: 小城故事)	Released: March 23, 1979; Label: Polydor Records, Kolin Records	IFPI HK: Platinum
An Unforgettable Day (難忘的一天)	Released: September 20, 1979; Label: Kolin Records	
My Native Land (原鄉人)	Released: 1980; Label: Polydor Records	

=== Extended plays ===
Title	EP details
Begonia Girl / Sunflower (海棠姑娘 / 向日葵)	Released: April 1972; Label: Life Records; Formats: LP

=== Other albums ===
- 1968 – Diu Diu Tong (丟丟銅)
- 1969 – Glittering (晶晶)
- 1972 – You Know Who I Love (你可知道我愛誰)
- 1973 – As Long As I Know Love/Nan Nu Wa Love Song (當我已經知道愛/娜奴娃情歌)
- 1973 – Bury Love in Your Heart (把愛埋藏在心窩)

=== Concert albums ===
- 1970 – I Smile When I See You (一見你就笑)
- 1970 – Tears of Light Rain (淚的小雨)
- 1970 – When Will I Turn Back? (幾時再回頭)
- 1982 – Live Concert Recording (演唱會實況錄音)
- 1983 – Teresa Teng Concert Encore (鄧麗君演唱會Encore)

=== Posthumous compilation albums ===
- 1995 – Goodbye My Lover (Teresa Teng) (再見我的愛人・鄧麗君)
- 1995 – Forever Star
- 1996 – Teresa Teng's Concert (鄧麗君演唱會)
- 1997 – The Way We Were
- 2001 – Unforgettable (忘不了)
- 2001 – Pure Asia (情繫亞洲)
- 2002 – Top Selection (極品之選 天碟 環球)
- 2003 – Top Selection 2 (極品之選 2 天碟 環球)
- 2004 – Thinking of You (思君集- 縱使時空相隔 仍是此情不渝)
- 2005 – 10th Anniversary Commemorative Audio: Love in Heaven (逝世十周年紀念聲影存集 天國的情人)
- 2005 – Lovers in Heaven (Mandarin Album) (天國情人 國語大碟全集)
- 2005 – 15th Anniversary (15周年 雙黑膠復刻版)
- 2006 – The First Completed Compitation (花樣年華)
- 2008 – The Birth of a Legend (傳奇的誕生)
- 2010 – 15th Anniversary Collection (但願人長久 15週年紀念集)
- 2011 – 35th Anniversary (35週年; 24K Gold Disc)
- 2012 – Chinese Albums (中國語(全曲集))
- 2012 – Hong Kong Queen Elizabeth Stadium Concert (1982 version) (香港伊利沙伯體育館演唱會1982足本)
- 2013 – Island Love Songs Complete Compilation (島國之情歌全集)
- 2013 – 60th Birthday Special (君之紀念冊 誕生六十年鑽禧特集)
- 2013 – Japan Selection 璀璨東瀛原音集)
- 2014 – Hokkien Old Songs Album (福建名曲專輯)
- 2014 – A Touch of Serenity (New version) (淡淡幽情 (紀念彩膠/新版))
- 2014 – 1982 Hong Kong Queen Elizabeth Stadium Concert (1982香港伊利沙伯體育館演唱會)
- 2014 – Repayment (償還)
- 2014 – Music Album (曲專輯)
- 2014 – Island Love Songs Selection (雷射島國情歌精選)
- 2014 – Master Selection (名曲選)
- 2015 – Great Hits
- 2015 – Island Love Songs Selection Vol. 2 (雷射島國情歌精選 第二集)
- 2015 – Master Selection Vol. 2 (名曲選 第二輯)

== Japanese albums ==
=== Studio albums ===
Title	Album details	Sales
Kuko / Yukigesho (空港 / 雪化粧))	Released: October 21, 1974; Label: Polydor Records	
Yoru no Jokyaku/Onna no Ikigai (夜の乗客/女の生きがい)	Released: August 1, 1975; Label: Polydor Records	
Acacia no Yume (アカシアの夢, Akashia no Yume)	Released: November 21, 1975; Label: Polydor Records	
Ai no Sekai (愛の世界)	Released: April 1, 1976 (cover album); Label: Polydor Records	
Furusato wa Doko desu ka (ふるさとはどこですか)	Released: February 21, 1977; Label: Polydor Records	
Anata to Ikiru (あなたと生きる)	Released: December 1, 1977; Label: Polydor Records	
Nesshou! Tokyo Yakei (熱唱！東京夜景)	Released: June 21, 1978; Label: Polydor Records	
Kokoro ni Nokoru Yoru no Uta (心にのこる夜の唄)	Released: November 21, 1978 (cover album); Label: Polydor Records	
Kareinaru Nesshou (華麗なる熱唱)	Released: April 1, 1979; Label: Polydor Records	
Anata/Magokoro (あなた/まごころ)	Released: September 20, 1980; Label: Polydor Records	
Jerusomina no Aruita Michi (ジェルソミーナの步いた道)	Released: February 28, 1981; Label: Polydor Records	
Tabibito (旅人)	Released: June 1, 1983; Label: Taurus Records	
Tsugunai (つぐない)	Released: January 21, 1984; Label: Taurus Records	JPN: 1,500,000
Aijin (愛人)	Released: March 1, 1985; Label: Taurus Records	JPN: 1,500,000
Toki no Nagare ni Mi Omakase (時の流れに身をまかせ)	Released: July 31, 1986; Label: Taurus Records	JPN: 2,000,000
Intoxicating Tango (酒醉的探戈)	Released: December 25, 1986; Label: Taurus Records	
Wakare no Yokan (別れの予感)	Released: July 5, 1987; Label: Taurus Records	
Roman Shugi (浪漫主義))	Released: March 8, 1989; Label: Taurus Records	
91 Kanashimi to Odorasete: New Original Songs	Released: March 27, 1991; Label: Taurus Records	

=== Compilation albums ===
- Best Hit Album (1976)
- Perfect 24 (1976)
- Golden Double Deluxe (1977)
- Best (Karaoke Collection) (1978)
- Kareinaru Nesshō (華麗なる熱唱) (1979)
- Best & Best (1980)
- Teresa Teng (1984)
- Best 20 (1984)
- Original Best Hits (1985)
- Best Selection (1985)
- Original Best Selection (1985)
- Toki no Nagare ni Mi Omakase (時の流れに身をまかせ) (1986)
- Zenkyoku-shū (全曲集) (1987)
- Top Ten (1987)
- Best Hits '88 (1988)
- Saishin Original Best 15 (最新オリジナルベスト15, Saishin Orijinaru Besuto 15) (1988)
- Zenkyoku-shū (全曲集) (1989)
- Namida no Jōken (涙の条件) (1989)
- Zenkyoku-shū (Tsugunai Namida no Jōken (全曲集 つぐない涙の条件) (1989)
- Uta Dōjō (歌道場) (1990)
- Zenkyoku-shū: Towazugatari (全曲集 問わず語り) (1991)
- Zenkyoku-shū '92: Manatsu no Kajitsu/Hana (全曲集'92 - 真夏の果実/花) (1992)
- Best Selection '92 (1992)
- Zenkyoku-shū '93 (全曲集'93) (1993)
- Best Songs - Single Collection (1993)
- Zenkyoku-shū: Anata to Tomo ni Ikite Yuku (全曲集-あなたと共に生きてゆく) (1993)
- 94 Best Selection (1993)
- Zenkyoku-shū (全曲集) (1994)
- Tsugunai: Wakare no Yokan (つぐない 別れの予感) (1994)
- Toki no Nagare ni Mi o Makase/Aijin (時の流れに身をまかせ 愛人) (1994)
- Wakare no Yokan (別れの予感) (Wakarenoyokan)
- Yaraika (夜來香)
- Zenkyoku-shū '95 (全曲集'95)

=== Concert albums ===
- First Concert (1977)
- Concert Live (1986)
- NHK Concert Live (演唱會現塲錄音版) (1996)
- Third Anniversary Memorial Live Performance at Reid (三回忌メモリアル秘蔵LIVE at ルイードSankaiki Memoriaru Hizō Live at Ruīdo)/My Way (1987)
- Concert Live (1998)
- Last Concert (1999)

=== Posthumous compilation albums ===
- Utagoe wa Omoide ni Fuchidorare (歌声は想い出にふちどられ)) (1995)
- Eien no Utagoe Vol. 1 (永遠の歌声, Vol.1) (1995)
- Eien no Utagoe Vol. 2 (永遠の歌声, Vol.2) (1995)
- Eien no Utagoe Vol. 3 (永遠の歌声, Vol.3) (1995)
- Super Selection (1995)
- Zenkyoku-shū (全曲集; Complete Collection) (1995)
- 1995 The History of Teresa Teng (1995)
- 1995 可愛的鄧麗君I
- 1995 可愛的鄧麗君II
- Enka-shū (演花集; Enka Collection) (1996)
- Recollection (1996)
- Itsuki Hiroshi Yume Futari: Dream (五木ひろし夢ふたり-ドリーム, Itsuki Hiroshi Yume Futari: Dorīmu)
- Itsuki Hiroshi Yume Futari: Love (五木ひろし愛ふたり-Love) (1996)
- Go! Go! Teresa (1996)
- Singles (1996)
- Akogare no Senritsu (憧れの旋律~響往的旋律) (1996)
- More Go! Go! Teresa (1997)
- Best Selection (1997)
- Yumetachinu (全曲集'98-夢立ちぬ) (1998)
- Tian Mi Mi (Screen Theme Version) (甜蜜蜜（テンミミ）～スクリーン・テーマ集) (1998)
- Top Ten Cover Songs (Top Tenカバー集) (1998)
- Top Ten English Songs (Top Ten英語編) (1998)
- Top Ten Mandarin Songs (Top Ten中国語編) (1998)
- Zenkyoku-shū: Tsugunai (全曲集 ～つぐない～) (1999)
- Wasurarenai: Saigo no Recording (忘れられない～最後のレコーディング～, Wasurarenai: Saigo No Rekōdingu) (2001)
- Utahime: Tokusen no Sekai (歌姬 特撰の世界) (2002)
- Yume Uta Anada o Kanjite itai 21 Seiki no (夢歌 あなだを感じていたい 21世紀の) (2002)
- 50th Anniversary Best Collection (全曲集) (2003)
- 50th Anniversary Box: Endless Voyage (2003)
- Seitan 50-shū/Film Concert Kaijō Tokubetsu-han (Ima demo) (生誕50周 / フィルムコンサート会場特別版～今でも, Seitan 50-shū/Firumu Konsāto Kaijō Tokubetsu-han (Ima demo...)) (2003)
- Hoshi Densetsu Debut (Complete Single Collection) (星☆伝説 Debut 三十周 / 紀念) (2004)
- Utahime Densetsu (歌姫伝説 歿後10周 / 紀念) (2005)
- Memorial Best (永遠の歌姫, Eien no Utahime; lit. 'Eternal Songstress') (2005)
- The Best (2005)
- When Will You Return? (Mandarin version) (何君再來 中国語; 2005)
- Goodbye! (再見!, 2007)
- Japanese Single Collection (本語曲完全収録盤, 2007)
- Best+Best (2008)
- Ai no Best: Miki Takashi o Utau (愛のベスト〜三木たかしを歌う〜) (2009)
- Duet & Best (新生, Shinsei; lit. 'Rebirth')) (2010)
- 60 Diamond Best (生誕, Seiten; lit. 'Birthday')) (2012)
- Eien no Asia no Utahime (生誕６０周 永遠のアジアの歌姫) (2013)
- Cover Song Collection (2013)
- Lover's-18 Love Story (黄昏のひととき・あなたを想う) (2013)
- The Best (2014)
- Nihon no Kokoro no Uta (日本の心の歌) (2014)
- Nihon no Kokoro no Uta 2 (日本の心の歌2) (2014)
- Nihon no Kokoro no Uta 3 (日本の心の歌3) (2014)
- Famous Songs Collection (名唱集) (2014)
- Densetsu no Utahime (伝説の歌姫) (2015)
- First Concert Kanzen-ban: Ai o Anata ni/Furusato wa Doko desu ka (ファーストコンサート完全盤 愛をあなたに ふるさとはどこですか) (2015)
- 40/40 Best Selection (40/40~ベスト・セレクション) (2015)
- The Poetess (鄧麗君70週年特集, 2023)

=== Video albums ===
- 2009 DVD-BOX アジアの歌姫

== Cantonese albums ==
=== Studio albums ===
Title	Album details	Certifications
Irreconcilable (勢不兩立)	Released: December 18, 1980; Label: Polydor Records; Formats: LP, cassette, CD	IFPI HK: Platinum
Strolling Down the Road of Life (漫步人生路)	Released: May 18, 1983; Label: Polydor Records, Kolin Records; Formats: LP, cassette, CD	IFPI HK: Platinum
