= When Will You Return? =

1937 Mandarin popular song

Song by Zhou Xuan
- Language: Mandarin
- Released: 1937
- Composer: Liu Xue'an (劉雪庵)
- Lyricist: Huang Jiamo (黃嘉謨)

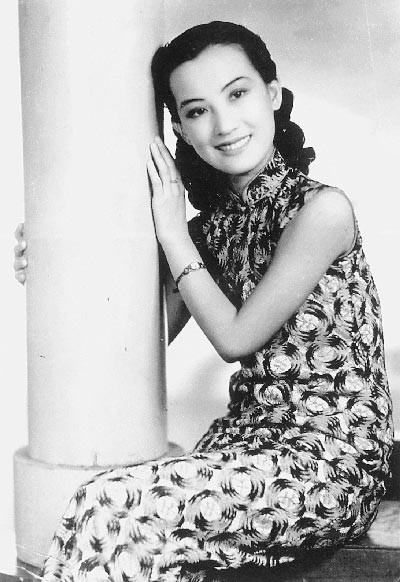
The song was originally sung by Zhou Xuan

"When Will You Return?" (Chinese: 何日君再來; pinyin: Hé Rì Jūn Zài Lái) is a song originally recorded by Chinese singer Zhou Xuan in 1937, but also well known as a song by Teresa Teng (1978). It has also been variously translated as "When Will the Gentleman Come Back Again?" or "When Will You Come Back Again?" The lyrics were written by Huang Jiamo (黃嘉謨) set to a tune composed by Liu Xue'an.

== Background ==
=== Composition ===
According to Liu Xue'an's son, the tune was written by his father at an undergraduate party at the Shanghai Music Conservatory, during which an impromptu song-composition competition was suggested. Liu wrote the melody quickly, played it as a tango song and won the approval of other students. The director Fang Peilin (d. 1949?) liked the tune, and asked Bei Lin (later identified as Huang Jiamo) to write the lyrics to be used for his new film.

=== Controversy ===
The song was highly popular as well as controversial. The controversy arose due to the various interpretations and political readings of its supposed "hidden" meaning. The lyrics were interpreted as either anti-Japanese, treasonous, or pornographic. After 1949 the song was banned by the People's Republic of China because it was seen as bourgeois and decadent. The writer Liu was criticized and suffered during the Anti-Rightist Movement in 1957 and during the Cultural Revolution in the 1960s. He offered a public self-criticism in 1980 before he was rehabilitated, but criticism of the song continued in mainland China for some time as an example of "Yellow Music", a product of decadent and immoral society.

This song was also banned during the martial law era in Taiwan because the title would be interpreted as "When will the Red Army/Japanese Army return" (何日軍再來, which 軍 has the same pronunciation as 君, and refers to either the Imperial Japanese Army or the People's Liberation Army), or "Celebrating the Japanese Army return" (賀日軍再來, which 賀 has the similar pronunciation as 何) by the Taiwan Garrison Command.

== Zhou Xuan's original version ==
The song was originally sung by Zhou Xuan and first appeared as an accompaniment to the film Three Stars by the Moon (三星伴月), a 1937 film directed by Fang Peilin and produced by the Yihua film company. The film was one of the last silent movies made in China, and the only silent movie Zhou Xuan starred in. The songs in the film were probably played to the audience on a gramophone synchronized with the action.

== Teresa Teng version ==
"When Will You Return?"
- Japanese single cover

Single by Teresa Teng

from the album A Love Letter and Best Songs - Single Collection
- Language: Mandarin; Japanese
- Released: December 21, 1978; April 28, 1993 (Japan)
- Genre: Pop
- Length: 2:36
- Label: Kolin; Polydor
- Composer: Liu Xue'an
- Lyricists: Huang Jiamo; Teresa Teng

The song became heavily associated with Teresa Teng through her version. It was released on December 21, 1978, as part of her Mandarin studio album A Love Letter.

=== Background ===
Teng's rendition of "When Will You Return" achieved large amounts of popularity and nearly supplanted Zhou Xuan as "the primary singer identified with this song". In Mainland China too, Teng became prominent via the song. Geremie R. Barmé, author of In the Red: On Contemporary Chinese Culture, described the song as a "nostalgic ode". Barmé said that some individuals on the Mainland condemned the song, describing it as "traitorous" and "obscene". Memorials for Teng have included performances of "When Will You Return?"

=== Release ===
Teng originally re-wrote the lyrics of the original song by Zhou Xuan in 1967. In 1978, Teng chose to re-release "When Will You Return" following the end of the censorship imposed by the Taiwanese government at the time. She discarded the second and third paragraphs of the original four-part lyrics, retaining only the beginning, ending and the spoken portions. "When Will You Return" soon saw high amounts of popularity again upon the release of Teng's cover, after the original version was banned for 30 years due to its controversial lyrics. She additionally recorded an Indonesian version of the song titled "Cinta Suci" during the same year.

A Japanese rendition of the song was released as a 3-inch CD single and cassette though Taurus Records on April 28, 1993, in support of her compilation album Best Songs - Single Collection in Japan.

=== Track listing ===
1993 Japanese CD single

No.	Title	Length
1.	"When Will You Return? (何日君再來) (Chinese Version)"	2:52
2.	"When Will You Return? (何日君再來) (Japanese Version)"	2:52
3.	"When Will You Return? (何日君再來) (Karaoke)"	2:52
Total length:		8:36

== Other versions ==
Zhou's colleague, actress Li Lili performed the song in Cai Chusheng's film Orphan Island Paradise 孤島天堂 (1939). The song was translated into Japanese and sung by Hamako Watanabe (1940), and was re-released by Li Xianglan the following year; Li (aka Yamaguchi Yoshiko) was fluent in both Chinese and Japanese, and also performed Chinese versions.

The song has been recorded by Judy Ongg, Fei Yu-ching, Lisa Ono, Claire Kuo and many others. Mitsuki Takahata sang it as the title track to the film Itsu mata kimi to (2017). A rendition entitled “Waiting for Your Return” by Jasmine Chen and arranged by Christopher Tin played during the opening credit of the film Crazy Rich Asians (2018). There is also a Taiwanese Hokkien version by Jody Chiang.
