= Teresa Teng =

Taiwanese singer (1953–1995)

- 鄧麗君
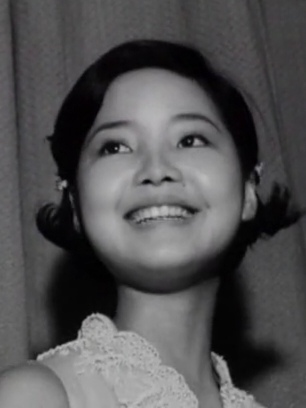
- Teng in 1969
- Born: Teng Li-yun (鄧麗筠); 29 January 1953; Baozhong, Yunlin, Taiwan
- Died: 8 May 1995 (aged 42); Chiang Mai, Thailand
- Burial place: Chin Pao San, New Taipei City, Taiwan; 25°15′04″N 121°36′14″E
- Occupations: Singer; song writer; television personality; philanthropist; lyricist
- Years active: 1966–1995
- Works: Albums; singles
- Partner: Paul Quilery (1989–1995)
- Musical career
- Also known as: Deng Lijun; Tang Lai Kwan; Teng Li Chun
- Genres: C-pop; J-pop; Chinese folk; Taiwanese folk; dangdut; enka; kayōkyoku; country; jazz; disco; pop; soul
- Instrument: Vocals
- Labels: Universal Music (present); Taiwan: Yeu Jow (1967–71); Haishan (1971); Life (1972–76); Kolin (1977–83); Polydor (1984–92); Hong Kong: EMI (1971); Life (1971–76); Polydor (1975–92); Japan: Polydor K.K. (1974–81); Taurus (1983–95)

Chinese name
- Traditional Chinese: 鄧麗君
- Simplified Chinese: 邓丽君
Transcriptions
Standard Mandarin
- Hanyu Pinyin: Dèng Lìjūn
- Bopomofo: ㄉㄥˋ ㄌㄧˋ ㄐㄩㄣ
Hakka
- Romanization: Then Li-kiûn
Yue: Cantonese
- Jyutping: Dang^{6} Lai^{6}-gwan^{1}
Southern Min
- Hokkien POJ: Tēng Lē-kun

Teng Li-Chun (traditional Chinese: 鄧麗君; simplified Chinese: 邓丽君; pinyin: Dèng Lìjūn; 29 January 1953 – 8 May 1995), also known as Teresa Teng, was a Taiwanese singer, television personality, musician, and philanthropist. Widely regarded as one of the most culturally significant figures in the Chinese-speaking world of the 20th century, she is considered to be one of the most successful and influential Asian musicians of all time. Her contributions to Chinese pop has given birth to the phrase, "Wherever there are Chinese-speaking people, there is music of Teresa Teng." A polyglot, Teng's music has transcended geographical, linguistic, and political boundaries across Asia for several decades.

With a career spanning almost thirty years, Teng established herself as a dominant and influential force in Asia throughout most of her career, particularly in East and Southeast Asia. Teng is credited as the Far East's first pop superstar and a pioneer of modern Chinese pop music — a major force in the development of the Chinese music industry by incorporating western and eastern styles into her music, replacing the mostly revolutionary songs then prevalent in mainland China and laying the foundation for modern Chinese popular music.

Throughout her career, Teng recorded more than 1,700 songs in her native language, Mandarin, but also in Hokkien, Cantonese, Shanghainese, Japanese, Indonesian, English and Italian. Teng is considered instrumental in bridging the political and cultural divides across Chinese-speaking regions. She was one of the first artists to connect Japan to East and Southeast Asia. In Taiwan, Teng rose to fame for entertaining the armed forces and singing patriotic songs that appealed to the people of the island. She was nicknamed "the patriotic entertainer" and "the soldiers' sweetheart". To date, Teng's songs have been covered by hundreds of artists worldwide.

Teng has sold over 48 million albums, excluding sales in Mainland China, according to the IFPI. In 1986, she was named by Time as one of the seven greatest female singers in the world. In 2009, in an online poll by a Chinese government web portal to celebrate the 60th anniversary of the People's Republic of China, Teng was deemed the most influential cultural figure in China since 1949 with 8.5 million votes. On the eve of International Women's Day in 2010, she was named the most influential woman in modern China in a poll conducted by various Chinese media outlets. Teng was inducted into the Popular Music Hall of Fame at the Koga Masao Museum of Music in Tokyo in 2007, making her the only non-Japanese person to be inducted.

== Early life ==
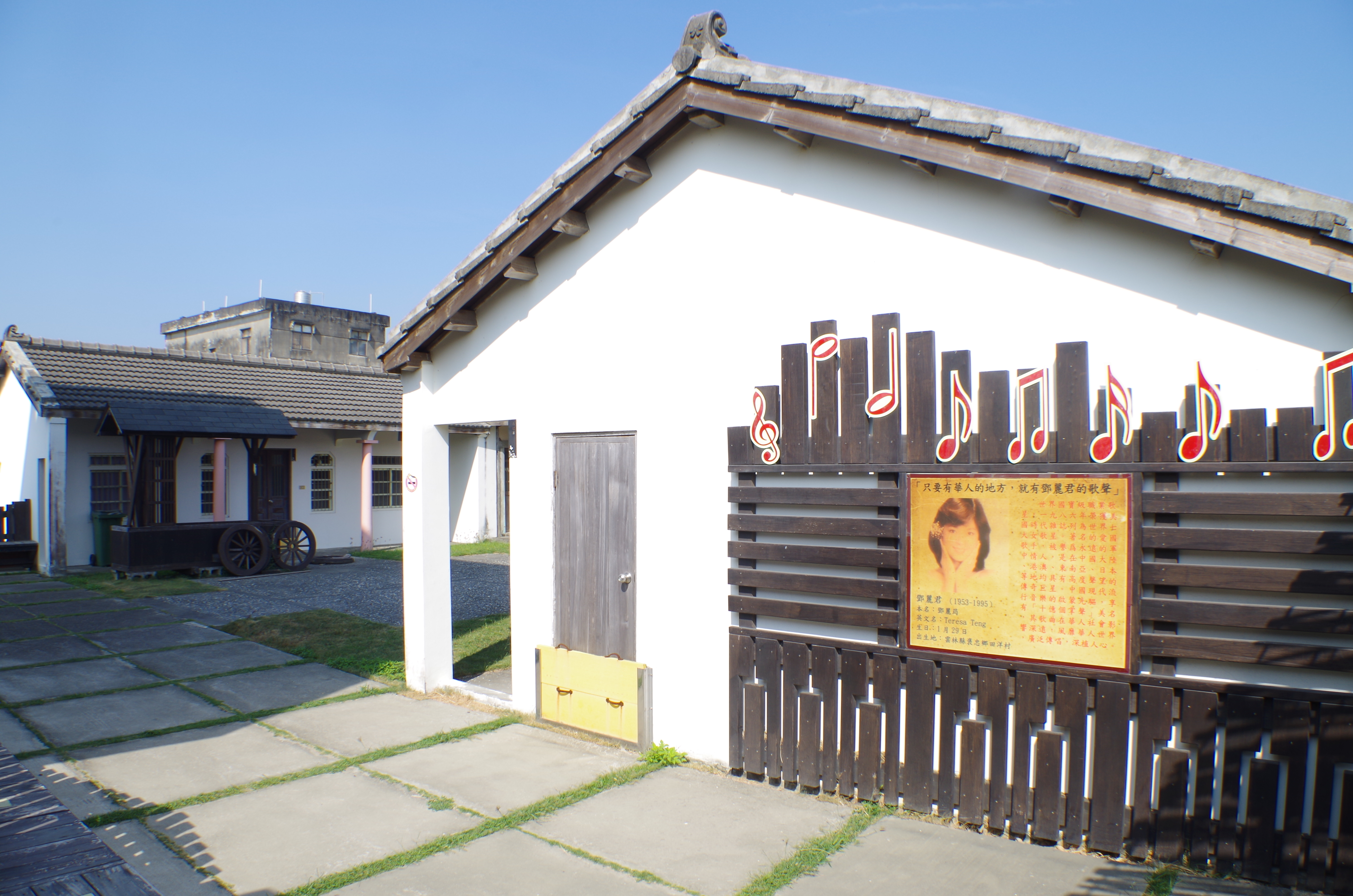
Teng's birthplace in Baozhong, Taiwan

Teng was born Teng Li-yun to waishengren parents in Baozhong, Yunlin County in Taiwan on 29 January 1953. Her father was a soldier in the Republic of China Armed Forces from Daming, Hebei, and her mother was from Dongping County, Shandong, who fled to Taiwan after communists took over mainland China in 1949.

The only daughter among five children, Teng was raised in a poverty-stricken Kuomintang family and spent her early childhood in military dependents' villages, first in Yunlin and then in Pingtung. In 1957, Teng's father retired and then worked selling cakes to make ends meet. Teng received her early education at Luzhou Elementary School in Luzhou, Taipei County, Taiwan.

Teng was exposed to music at an early age through her music-loving parents. Her father was a Peking opera enthusiast, and her mother appreciated Huangmei opera, often accompanying Teng to Chinese movie theatres and opera houses. At age six, Teng began voice lessons through an acquaintance of her father, who instructed an Air Force band. Considering the environment of 1950s Taiwan under martial law, Teng's first mentor introduced her to singing before military audiences, a practice Teng continued throughout her life.

Teng won her first major prize in 1964, when she sang "Visiting Yingtai" from Shaw Brothers' Huangmei opera movie, The Love Eterne, at an event hosted by the Broadcasting Corporation of China. The following year, Teng went to attend Ginling Girls' High School in Sanchong, Taipei County, to further her studies. However, due to a conflict between her performance and studies, forced by family economic factors, Teng dropped out of school in the second year and pursued her career as a singer professionally. Teng was soon able to support her family with her singing.

== Career ==
=== Early beginnings and rise to fame ===
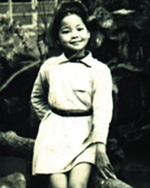
Teng as a child

Teng's professional career commenced in 1967 with her role as host of the television program One Star a Day. The show, which aired for 20 minutes, was broadcast from Tuesday to Sunday. She then appeared in television dramas and movies, including a leading role in the 1967 film Thank You, Manager. At the age of 14, Teng withdrew from school to focus on music. She signed with a local company, Yeu Jow Records, and began to release a series of long-playing albums of "a go-go" dance tunes and cover versions of Western pop songs as well as local Taiwanese, Chinese, and Southeast Asian folk tunes. However, due to the lack of extra copyright royalties to increase her income, Teng committed to singing in nightclubs around Taiwan. She debuted at Paris Night, an upscale Taipei nightclub, and set a record for performing onstage there for 70 consecutive days, giving a 90-minute performance every single day.

Teng's albums sold well, and she eventually got an opportunity to record a theme song for Jingjing, Taiwan's first televised series. She then did a promotional tour that attracted attention in the media. Teng's first taste of fame came in 1968 when a performance on the popular Taiwanese music program The Gathering of Stars led to a record contract. She released several albums within the next few years under the Life Records label in Hong Kong. During these years, Teng recorded several top hits, such as "Remembering Mama" and "The Moment I See You, I Smile". She held concerts in Southeast Asia, drawing big crowds throughout the region. Teng's earnings from performing and recording eventually afforded her family a comfortable life; they moved from Luzhou District to Beitou District, Taipei, where they bought a home.

By the 1970s, Teng's music style had changed; she fused pop and opera styles and incorporated Western jazz in order to further expand her market. Teng's popularity boomed in Asia after she released several albums in multiple languages. In April 1979, Teng held her first concert in Vancouver, Canada. On her next trip, Teng toured major US cities such as San Francisco and Los Angeles. In 1980, she was invited to perform at Lincoln Center in New York and the Los Angeles Music Center in California, becoming the first singer of Chinese descent to make a headline there. Upon her return to Taiwan, Teng went on a Southeast Asian tour in 1981, drawing 35,000 attendees in Malaysia. She continued to hold large-scale concerts in Hong Kong and the Southeast Asian region almost every year. In 1983, Teng performed a series of concerts at The Colosseum at Caesars Palace in Las Vegas. They met with tremendous success. Teng gave many free concerts throughout most of her career to help the less fortunate or raise funds for charities. The funds collected from her concerts were donated to public welfare.

=== Musical move in China ===
Kuai le de qia qia gu niang, by Teresa Teng in 1971.

For most of the previous three decades, China was both economically and culturally closed to the rest of the world. Around 1974, Teng's songs began to trickle into China with the availability of radios. In 1977, her song "The Moon Represents My Heart" became one of the earliest foreign songs to arrive in the mainland. In 1978, with economic reform and the opening of borders, cassette recorders and pirated recordings of Teng's songs began to flow from coastal cities to the rest of the country. Her popularity soon skyrocketed. In Taiwan, Teng's songs became a propaganda tool for the KMT's psychological war against the Chinese Communist Party. Her songs were blasted from the sea-facing speakers from Kinmen Island to the residents of mainland China. This propaganda practice continued throughout the 1980s.

In the early 1980s, continuing political tension between mainland China and Taiwan led to her music, along with that of other singers from Taiwan and Hong Kong, being banned for some years in mainland China, describing it as too "bourgeois" and "corrupt" by Chinese authorities. In spite of the ban, Teng's songs defied the censorship and penetrated China's iron curtain. Her popularity continued in China through cassettes sold on the black market, with fans paying up to a month's rent for pirated cassettes of her songs. Teng's songs continued to be played everywhere, from nightclubs to government buildings, and the ban was soon lifted. Teng became almost as well known in mainland China as the country's leader. Her fans nicknamed her "Little Deng" because she had the same family name as Deng Xiaoping; there was a saying that, by day, everyone listened to "old Deng" because they had to. At night, everyone listened to "Little Teng" because they wanted to. Shanghai Party newspaper Wenhui Bao expressed fears that Teng's songs may erode the revolutionary spirit of the (Communist) Chinese. Faced with this solid wall of popularity, mainland China ceased its restrictions on her music from the mid-1980s onward.

=== Light Exquisite Feeling and political outlook ===
Teng's contract with Polydor ended in 1981, and she signed a contract with Taurus Records in 1983 and made a successful comeback appearance in Japan. That same year, Teng released her most critically acclaimed album, Dandan youqing, translated as Light Exquisite Feeling, which adapts twelve poems from the Tang and Song dynasties into music, blending modern and traditional styles. It became her first album to include entirely new songs, without any covers. The most popular single from the album is "Wishing We Last Forever". Teng apparently felt a deep attachment to the mainland, as she immersed herself in the classics of the Tang and Song periods. In a television special, Teng spoke of her desire to contribute to the transmission of "Chinese" culture. Dressed in period clothing, she commented:

I have one small desire. I hope everyone will like these songs, and will learn these songs so that the flourishing begonias within its [China's] ten million square kilometers and the treasures of this 5000-year-old culture can be handed down from generation to generation through song. And through song, I hope our posterity will never forget the happiness, sadness, and glory of being a "Chinese" person.

The album achieved widespread commercial success, selling over five million copies throughout Asia, making it the best-selling Chinese music album as of August 2008. It received a positive response from both the public and critics, commending Teng's outstanding interpretation of the ancient poems and successfully projecting classical Chinese literature into a contemporary popular music style. It was well accepted in Southeast Asia and went gold on the first day of its release in Hong Kong. Yang Yanxing, a professor at Tianjin Conservatory of Music, greatly praised the album, describing it as "the finest work of the Chinese music circle". In March 2012, Pu Xiqian from the China News Service called the album a "perfect combination of poems and music". Later, Teng started working on completing a sequel to the album. However, due to changes in the surroundings of music, as well as her deteriorating health and other reasons, she failed to realize her wish.

In 1987, Teng released the Mandarin version of the album I Only Care About You. After that, owing to her health issues, she virtually stopped participating in commercial activities and gradually entered a semi-retired state. Teng performed in Paris during the 1989 Tiananmen student protests on behalf of the students and expressed her support. On 27 May 1989, over 300,000 people attended the Concert for Democracy in China (民主歌聲獻中華) at the Happy Valley Racecourse in Hong Kong. One of the highlights was her rendition of "My Home Is on the Other Side of the Mountain".

Though Teng performed in many countries around the world, she never performed in mainland China. During her 1980 TTV concert, when asked about such a possibility, Teng responded by stating that the day she performs on the mainland will be the day the Three Principles of the People are implemented there—in reference to either the pursuit of Chinese democracy or reunification under the banner of the ROC.

=== Career in Hong Kong ===
In 1975, Teng collaborated with Polydor Records of Hong Kong. Her album Island Love Songs: Goodbye My Love (1975) won her the Ten-Star Prize and the opportunity to star in a movie musical of her own. The album was awarded platinum at Hong Kong's first Golden Album Awards. In 1976, Teng held her first Hong Kong concert at Lee Theatre, which was a tremendous success. Teng continued performing in concerts for the next five years, attracting big crowds throughout this time. Two years later, Teng's albums Teresa Teng's Greatest Hits and Love Songs of the Island 3 won her second Golden Album Award. Teng released her first Cantonese album, Irreconcilable (勢不兩立) in 1980, which became the best-seller of the year; its single, "Forget Him", became one of the most famous Cantonese pop songs at that time. The album received platinum at the Golden Album Awards.

In 1982, her dual album of Teresa Teng's Concert Live became another platinum album after hitting the market. Teng became a household name in Hong Kong and held a concert at Queen Elizabeth Stadium the same year. Her second album, Strolling Down the Road of Life (漫步人生路), released in 1983, achieved even greater success than her predecessor. It became her fifth consecutive album to be awarded platinum, a record-breaking win among all singers in Hong Kong. Teng's popularity reached its peak by the end of 1983 with six straight sold-out concerts at the Hong Kong Coliseum. These concerts broke all sorts of Hong Kong records and played to a combined total audience of about 100,000 people. The concert, named A Billion Applause Concert, was performed in Hong Kong from 29 December 1983 to 3 January 1984, in honor of her 15th year as a performer. A year later, Teng was awarded a special medal by PolyGram Hong Kong as a tribute to her success for having sold more than five million copies in Hong Kong. By 1988, the IFPI Hong Kong had certified seventeen of her albums as platinum, making her the artist with the second most platinum albums of all time, only behind Alan Tam.

=== Career in Japan ===
Teng entered the Japanese market in 1973. On 1 March 1974, she released her debut Japanese single, No Matter Tonight or Tomorrow, marking the start of her career in Japan. Initially, the single received a lukewarm response, peaking at 75th on the Oricon Chart with sales of approximately 30,000. The Watanabe firm considered giving up using Teng's name. However, considering her success in Asia, the record company decided to release two or three consecutive singles to test the market further. On 1 July 1974, Teng's second single "Airport" was released. The sales of 'Airport' were huge, totaling 700,000 copies. She then released a number of successful singles, including "The Night Ferry" and "Goodbye, My Love". In 1979, Teng was caught with a fake Indonesian passport while entering Japan and was deported and banned from entering the country for one year.

After a long absence, Teng returned to the Japanese market on 21 September 1983 and released her first single "Tsugunai" (Atonement) after her comeback on 21 January 1984. The single did not receive a good response initially; however, after a month, sales started to pick up, and seven months later, "Tsugunai" eventually ranked eighth on the Oricon Chart and first on the Japan Cable Broadcasting Chart. By the end of the year, sales surpassed 700,000 copies, and final sales reached a million copies. Teng won the top award of 'Singer of the year' from Japan Cable Award. "Tsugunai" won the most popular song category and stayed on the Oricon Chart for nearly a year. The success broke all the sales records of her previous period (1974–79). On 21 February 1985, Teng's next single, "Aijin" (Lover) topped the Oricon Chart and Japan cable broadcasting request chart in the first week of its release. The song remained #1 for 14 consecutive weeks, and sales broke the 1.5 million mark. With "Aijin", Teng won the 'Singer of the Year' for the second time. Moreover, she was invited to perform in Kōhaku Uta Gassen, which represented a high honor that is restricted to the top performers of the year in the Japanese music world.

Teng's next single, "Toki no Nagare ni Mi o Makase" was released on 21 February 1986. The single topped both the Oricon and Japan Cable Broadcasting Chart, and sales of the single reached 2.5 million in the Asian market, becoming one of the most popular singles in Japan that year. Teng won the Japan Cable Award for the third time in a row. She was invited to perform in Kōhaku Uta Gassen for the second time. Teng became the first-ever artist to achieve three consecutive wins of this Grand Prix, also known as Japan Cable Award. She also remains the only foreign singer to win this award for three consecutive years in the history of Japanese music (1984–86). Teng gave her last solo concert at the NHK Hall in Tokyo in 1985 before semi-retiring from the entertainment circle.

=== As a military singer in Taiwan ===
One of Taiwan's most famous cultural exports, Teng was born to a military family, her father served as a member of the Republic of China Armed Forces during World War II. After the regime collapsed on the mainland, the Nationalist government switched to Taiwan as its base after 1949. As a child, Teng grew up in this martial environment of the 1950s. Her first mentor introduced her to singing before military audiences, a practice she continued throughout her life. In those years, Teng gave many performances for soldiers and sang patriotic songs on television programs. In February 1979, while attempting to enter Japan, Teng was caught using a fake Indonesian passport she bought on the black market. The incident was criticized both in Taiwan and Japan. She was barred for one year from entering the country by Japan's Minister of Justice.

In 1980, a year after the incident, she was allowed to return to Taiwan on condition of cooperation with the Taiwanese government. Teng performed for the Taiwanese troops again, and the income from her performances was donated to the "Funds for Self-Improvement and Patriotism". In August 1981, Teng performed for the troops for one month, touring military sites all over Taiwan. She visited the generals of the army, navy, and air force and sang for them. These performances were broadcast on TTV's special program named Teresa Teng on the Frontline. Due to her vigorous devotion to soldiers in Taiwan, Teng was awarded the "Patriotic Entertainer" medal by the government information office. These frequent performances for the troops garnered her the nickname "the soldiers' sweetheart" by the media. In 1988, the death of President Chiang Ching-kuo marked the end of martial rule in Taiwan. In the early 1990s, Teng returned to entertain the troops again, with her last performance being in 1994.

== Artistry ==
=== Influences ===
Teng credits Chinese folk songs and music as a major influence on her musical career, which she often grew up listening to. As a young child, Teng was exposed to music by her music-loving parents. Teng learned Peking opera through her father, while her mother introduced her to Huangmei opera, accompanying her to opera houses and encouraging Teng to sing in that style by purchasing songbooks for her. Alongside regional and folk styles, Teng was also influenced by shidaiqu and Japanese music. In addition to music, Teng was an admirer of Florence Nightingale, Xi Shi, and Lin Daiyu.

=== Voice ===
Teng was a soprano, according to The New York Times. She possessed more than 3-octave vocal range: C3 (LowC) ~ E6 (HiE) and was known for her "soothing and crystalline" singing voice, with her vocal trademark classified as a "quasi-whisper", which David B. Gordon characterizes as a "private emotion" in her listeners—as though she were singing for each of them individually. Examining her vocal abilities, NetEase Entertainment praised Teng's soft voice style in the high range, describing her ability to "sing the high notes from C5 to G5 with the strength and timbre of her natural voice." It also commended Teng's breath control and her command of an array of genres.

Wang Yueyang from Sina News commented that "Teng's voice is very distinctive, soft, and soothing," stating that "you can't hear her breathing and she can sing continuous high notes without nasal sounds." Cultural critic Rey Chow has labelled Teng's voice as soft, throaty, and feminine, whereas Mike Levin of Billboard described her voice as "soft and almost breathless". Teng's voice covered a diverse range of musical styles and languages. Meredith Schweig at Emory University notes that "Teng was famously versatile: she performed confidently in multiple languages and seamlessly blended haipai, enka, and Euro-American pop stylings in dozens of hit records," and that Teng's "voice and physical appearance were venerated as the apotheosis of feminine beauty and virtue."

=== Lyrical writing ===
In 1987, Teng recorded the song "Summer Christmas", a cover of the Japanese song "Merry X'mas in Summer", originally recorded by Kuwata Band member Keisuke Kuwata. The same year, Teng recorded "River of Destiny", a cover of the Japanese original "Sadame Gawa". She composed the lyrics of both songs in Mandarin and included them on her 1987 Mandarin album, I Only Care About You. In 1988, Teng wrote the lyrics for the song "We Are the Stars" in both Chinese and Japanese versions and sang it on stage with Japanese musician Yūzō Kayama on 29 October. In 1992, Teng penned the lyrics for what was later revised into a song, "Star's Wish", after she died.

== Other ventures ==
=== Philanthropy ===
Teng began charity performances at a very young age. One of her first performances came on 17 August 1968, when she sang at the charity fair in Zhongshan Hall in Taipei, for the relief of the earthquake in the Philippines. The charity sale was donated on the spot. The following year, Teng was invited by the wife of the then-President of Singapore Yusof Ishak to a charity performance at the Singapore National Opera House. That same year, Teng performed at the Ten-Star Charity Performance, held by the Singaporean authorities. In 1971, she became the youngest person ever to be awarded the title of the "Charity Queen" of Hong Kong's Bai Hua You Arts Auction for making charity sales. On 8 June 1973, Teng participated in the "Far East Top Ten Stars Charity Gala" in Singapore, gave four performances, and raised $400,000 to be used as scholarships for students in need.

Teng continued performing for philanthropic causes throughout the 1970s in Singapore, Taiwan, and Hong Kong. In 1980, she raised over US$1 million for Yan Chai Hospital in Hong Kong and donated the proceeds of her show in Taiwan to that country's national trust fund. In January 1982, Teng held a concert at the Queen Elizabeth Stadium in Hong Kong, and the first proceeds were used for charitable donations; in August, she donated NT$160,000 to build a water tower in a village in northern Thailand and introduce a drinking water system. In 1985, Teng held a solo concert at the NHK Hall in Tokyo, Japan, the proceeds of which were donated to charity. She made a special trip to Hong Kong in July 1991 to participate in the disaster relief program of ATV's "Love for East China" as a special charity performance guest to raise funds. Teng gave her last performance in 1994 in Taiwan, a year before her sudden and unexpected death.

== Death and commemorations ==
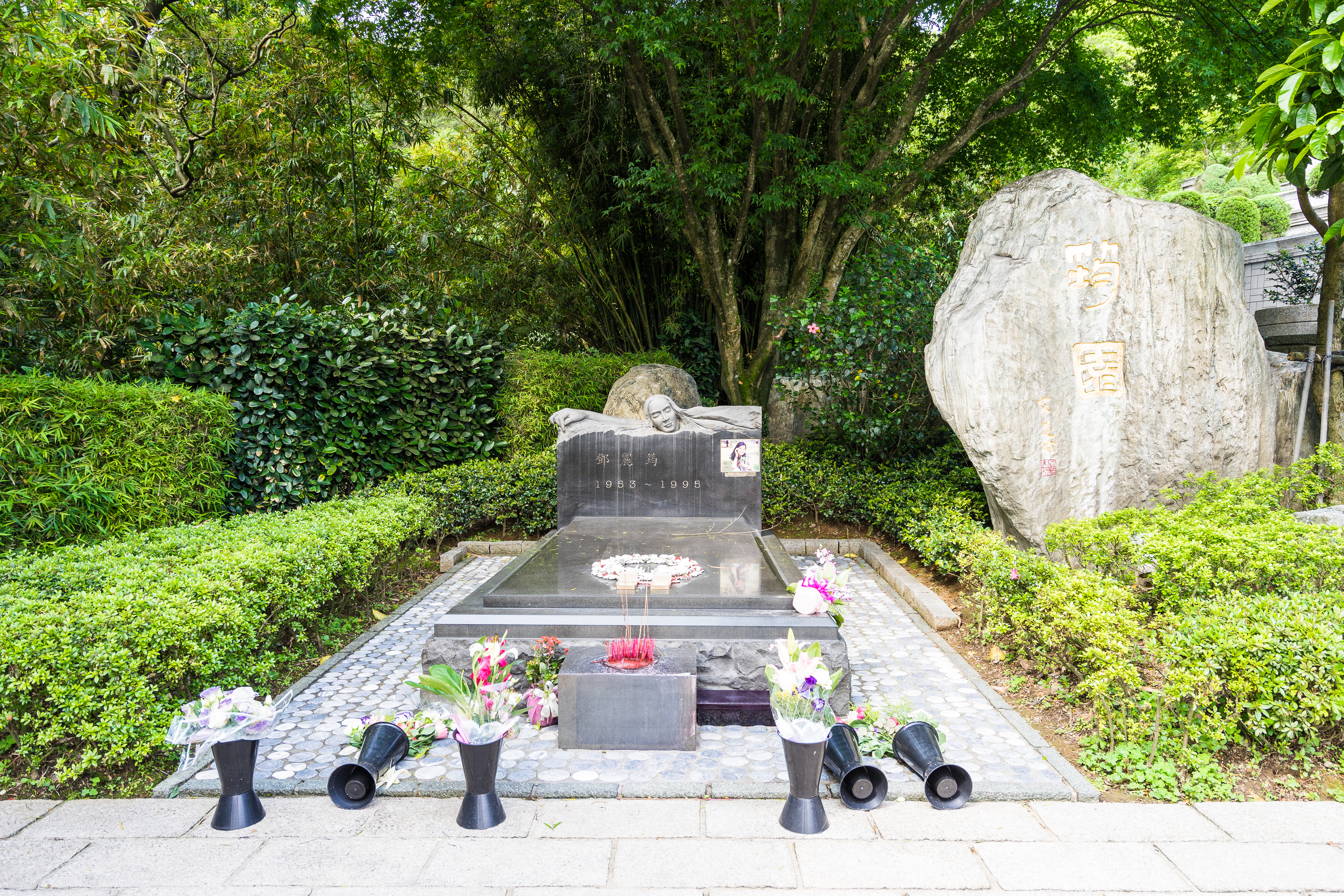
Tomb of Teresa Teng

On 8 May 1995, Teng died suddenly and unexpectedly while on holiday in Chiang Mai, Thailand, at age 42. Several sources reported a severe asthma attack as the cause of her death; however, Thai doctors attributed Teng's death to heart failure, but no autopsy was performed. Teng had complained of having respiratory difficulties since the beginning of the year. A first witness, her personal butler, reported Teng to have been well in the morning, gone to exercise in the afternoon before returning to her hotel. Police later reported she took a bath in her room. When medical attention appeared in need Teng had difficulties to breathe, had no medical devices with her, while her hands and feet became numb. Her 4km emergency transportation from the Imperial Mae Ping Hotel to the Chiang Mai Ram Hospital was slowed down by heavy traffic, preventing rapid access to medical care. According to some witnesses, she was accompanied by her French fiancé Paul Quilery, who was off scene when the attack occurred. The cause of death was never confirmed, as both Teng and Quilery's families declined to allow an autopsy. Later, the case was closed by the police due to a lack of evidence.

Billboard stated that Teng's death "produced a unified sense of loss throughout all of Asia". Her funeral in Taiwan became the largest state-sponsored funeral in the island's history, second only to that of ROC leader Chiang Kai-shek. Over 200,000 people lined up outside the funeral home, waiting to bid their last farewells to Teng, causing traffic in Taipei to come to a standstill. Teng's body was placed in a specially constructed crystal copper coffin, designed to preserve her body for up to 50 years. Her funeral was broadcast on television stations across many Asian countries, while radio stations in Taiwan, China, and Hong Kong devoted their entire programming schedules to her music for two days.

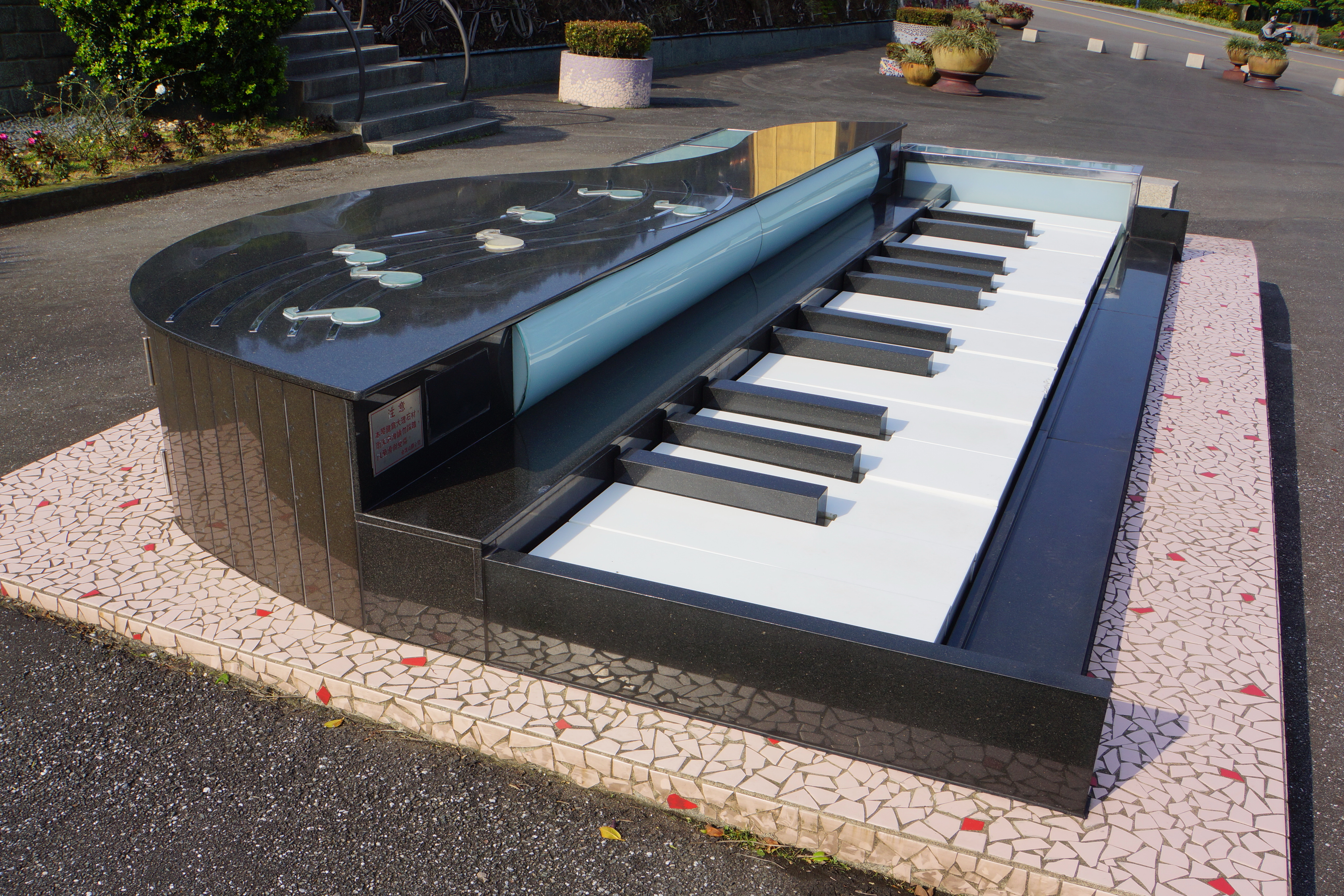
Electronic keyboard piano at Teresa Teng's Memorial Park

Teng was given state honors at her funeral, with Taiwan's flag draped around her coffin. Hundreds of high-ranking officials and dignitaries, including commanders from three branches of the military, attended the funeral and accompanied Teng's coffin to her grave. A day of national mourning was declared and President Lee Teng-hui was among the thousands in attendance. Teng was posthumously awarded the Ministry of Defense's highest honor for civilians, the KMT's "Hua-hsia Grade One Medal", the Overseas Chinese Affairs Commission's "Hua Guang Grade One Medal", and the president's commendation. Teng was buried in a mountainside tomb at Chin Pao San, a cemetery in Jinshan, New Taipei City (then Taipei County) overlooking the north coast of Taiwan.

According to Teng's maiden name character, Yun, the grave was named "Yun Yuan". The gravesite features a golden-colored, life-size statue of her, and a large electronic piano keyboard set in the ground that can be played by visitors who step on the keys. On the tombstone, the head of Teng is carved. The coffin lid behind the tombstone is polished with black marble. Behind the coffin lid is a stone sculpture. The upper half is a lying portrait of the singer, and the right side of the lower half is inlaid with a color photo of her, with the words "Deng Lijun, 1953–1995" written on the left side. On the right side of the coffin lid, there is a huge stone with the words "Yunyuan" inscribed by James Soong, Governor of Taiwan Province. On the left side of the coffin lid, there is a stone stele on which is engraved with the epitaph: "Here lies a superstar who dedicated her life to singing." The memorial is often visited by Teng's fans.

In May 1995, Shanghai Radio host Dalù dedicated the Sunday morning broadcast to the Taiwanese singer, who had died a few days earlier. Spreading her songs was banned in mainland China and the journalist was formally warned for this act. In 1995, a tribute album, A Tribute to Teresa Teng, was released, which contained covers of Teng's songs by prominent Chinese rock bands. In May 2002, a wax figure of Teng was unveiled at Madame Tussauds Hong Kong. A house she bought in 1986 in Hong Kong at number 18 Carmel Street, Stanley, also became a popular fan site soon after her death. Plans to sell the home to finance a museum in Shanghai were made known in 2002, and it was subsequently sold for HK $32 million. It closed on what would have been her 51st birthday on 29 January 2004.

== Cultural impact and legacy ==
Throughout her thirty-year career and up to this point, Teng has been recognized as one of the most celebrated and influential figures in Asian music and popular culture, considering her deep impact on the whole of Chinese society, with an influence extending beyond music to include both political and cultural spheres, while her Asia-wide reach is largely attributed to her multilingual abilities, which established her as an icon in all of Asia, heralding the era of region-wide pop superstardom that has become today's norm.

=== Cultural impact ===
Her peculiarity lie in the fact that the different cultural trajectories developed by the special political background of the two sides of the Taiwan Strait merged two different trajectories in a specific time and space dislocation, so she became the favorite of many people in that era. It would not have been possible without controversy. Today, it seems that this was normal at the time. After all, it is impossible to fully accept a cultural phenomenon like Teresa Teng with the general values and consciousness of the people at that time.

— Wang Xiaofeng, Sanlian Lifeweek

Teng emerged as one of the biggest singers in the world in her heyday of the 1970s and 1980s, with many considering her the most famous Asian popstar of her time. Teng's profound influence on Asian popular music and the Chinese cultural sphere throughout the latter half of the 20th century and beyond led to her being recognized as the Far East's first pop superstar. She is credited by many as an enlightener and a pioneer of Chinese vocal performance art and modern popular music, opening up the performance paths of modern Chinese pop singers and enlightening the artistic dreams of many later musicians and cultural people.

Numerous musical and non-musical figures have cited Teng's music a major influence on their work. These include singer Faye Wong, Jay Chou, Jane Zhang, Kazukiyo Nishikiori of Japanese pop group Shonentai, Tetsuya Murakami of The Gospellers, Junko Akimoto, Rimi Natsukawa, "father" of Chinese rock Cui Jian, Romanian singer Cristina Boboacă, fashion designer Vivienne Tam, Nobel Prize laureate and writer Liu Xiaobo, poet and writer Xu Pei, manga artist Kenshi Hirokane, filmmaker Jia Zhangke, as well as painter and sculptor Jian Guo, among others.

==== Mainland China ====
Prior to the 1980s, foreign music and art were largely prohibited in mainland China for nearly three decades. Love songs were almost non-existent, with the majority of music stemming from politics or red songs, which heavily dominated the country's cultural domain. They were commonly revolutionary model operas promoting the ideals of the party and military. Jin Zhaojun, a prominent Chinese music critic, characterized the music of this period as "overly masculine and lacking femininity," in which people were denied a whole range of basic human desires and modes of expression. Teng's music, in this contrast, broke new ground in terms of style and content. She blended traditional Chinese folk music with Western pop and jazz, opening the doors to the musical creations of later generations.

Musicians began to study the new forms of music that entered the mainland through foreign cassettes and tape recorders, such as orchestration and singing style. She became the earliest guide for composers on how to arrange music for popular songs, and numerous musicians reproduced their work by imitating her. An important piece of testimony to this is the use of saxophone introduced by Teng. Her frequent use of jazz or jazz-influenced ensembles in her music set the standard for saxophone performance practice in mainland pop today. Another aspect of Teng's influence was the establishment of a "breath singing method". Jin pointed out that, before this, alongside more authentic folk singing, the Chinese also had a "national singing" between bel canto and folk singing. Teng taught that people could also sing with another part of their voice, which was later named "popular singing".

Teng's songs were centered on a range of subjects, most primarily love and human relations—the most lacking elements in mainland culture at the time. By the early 1970s, as rates of radio ownership began to increase, especially of cheap and portable transistor models, listening to Teng's music rose in popularity. Author Ah Cheng recalled hearing her music for the first time in 1975 as a sort of excitement and extreme addiction that he and his friends would press their ears to the wooden frame of a shortwave radio only to get her voice heard. His account of his internal exile in the mountains of Yunnan is better representative of this phenomenon:

Yunnan was endowed with a magnificent geographical gift: you could hardly hear central people's radio, and the newspaper would take days to make its way into the mountains and then be collected at the party's secretary's house, where you could ask him to tear off a strip when you wanted to roll up a cigarette. For people who listened to enemy radio, radio from the center, or the official newspaper was merely a supplemental reference. But listening to enemy radio was not about political news so much as entertainment. I remember that whenever the Australian national station broadcast a radio play of the Taiwanese film The Story of a Small Town everyone would bring their own radio because the shortwave signal would tend to drift and that way we could cover the entire frequency range and make sure we had continuous sound from at least one receiver at a time. The boys and girls sitting around that grass hut would be in tears! Especially when Teresa Teng's voice rang out, emotions would rise to a fever pitch – her voice was to die for.

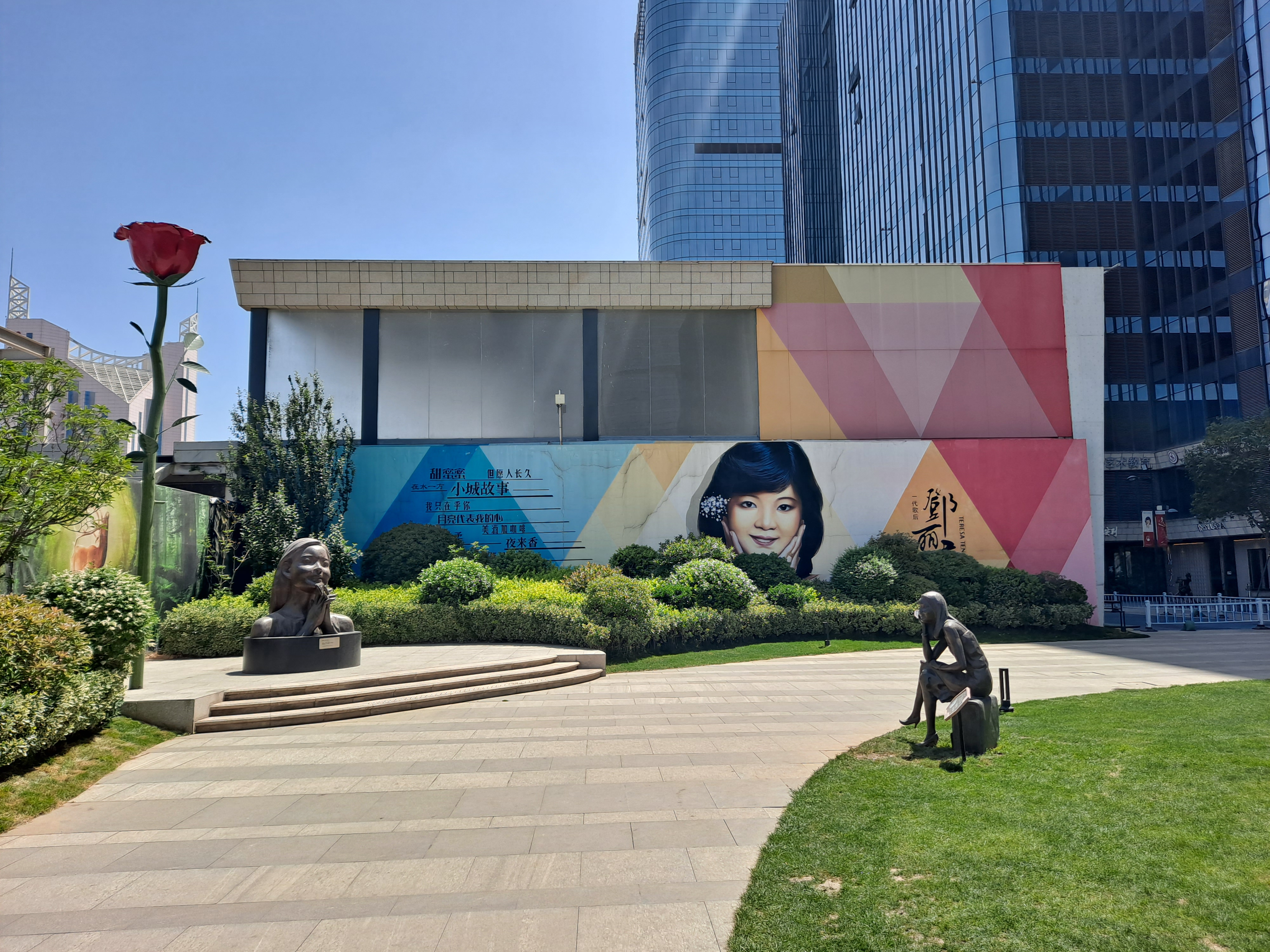
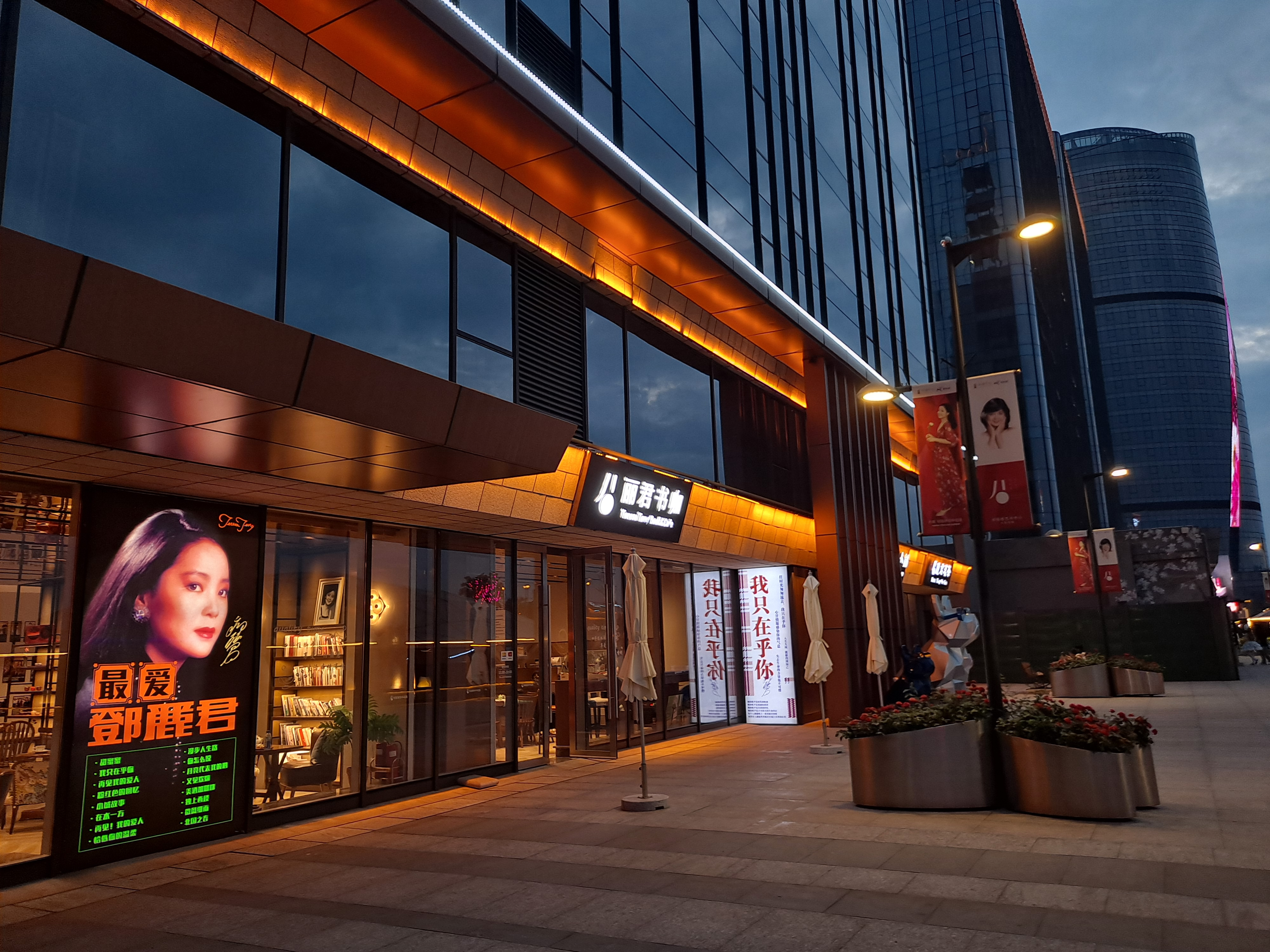
Teresa Teng Sky Garden in Handan, Hebei, China

The popularity of Teng's music among her listeners marked the birth of China's fan culture. Without the technology to communicate, fans organized their own groups of fandom by sharing her tapes or discussing her music together. Teng's music fandom is considered the earliest stage of the development of the Chinese pop culture fandom, before which no popular media could be found. In 1977, Teng's popular love song "The Moon Represents My Heart" was released; it became one of the first foreign songs to break into the country. Her songs over the following decade revolutionized Chinese popular culture, which marked the end of the extremely tight control exercised in the preceding three decades by the communist party over Chinese society and culture.

Author Ah Cheng cited Teng's songs as an inspiration for the revival of popular culture on the mainland. Wu'erkaixi, a Chinese political commentator of Uyghur heritage, asserted that the youngsters who listened to her songs discovered the desire for the pursuit of freedom through her singing voice. He adds that "to the Chinese, Deng Lijun was a great person. If Deng Xiaoping brought economic freedom to China, she brought liberation of the body and free thinking to China."

According to Nobel Peace Prize laureate and writer Liu Xiaobo, "Teng's romantic songs reawakened our soft centers by dismantling the cast-iron frame work of our "revolutionary wills," melting our cold, unfeeling hearts, reviving sexual desires, and liberating our long-suppressed human softness and tenderness." Filmmaker Jia Zhangke said that Teng's songs were a big inspiration that drove his curiosity towards cinema. He relates: "Her songs represented a massive transformation in the cultural landscape of China at that time. Prior to the 1980s, China had no popular culture to speak of. The closest thing we had was revolutionary model operas and things made in that mold. Everything around us was structured collectively: we, but Teng's songs, on the other hand, were entirely new at the time.. they evoked individual desire: me, changing everything."

Regarding her contribution to the development of the music industry in China, Wang Xiaofeng at Sanlian Lifeweek wrote, "Teng not only pioneered the development of popular music but also stimulated the rapid development of audio-video companies at that time." He stated that listening to tapes was one of the main cultural activities and that they were luxury goods, but this did not stop ordinary people from consuming them. In 1979, there were only a few audio-video distribution companies in the Mainland. By 1982, it had increased to 300, indicating Teng's music as the trailblazer for this change.

==== Outside Mainland China ====
Teng became popular in Japan and Southeast Asia, and to some extent, South Asia, achieving a "cult status" in Hong Kong, Taiwan, mainland China, and Japan, where she became a "barometer of cross-strait relations" in rising geopolitical tensions at the time, and one of the first artists to break through linguistic and cultural barriers, garnering recognition and acclaim from cultures across much of the region that had previously been confined to national borders. Teng's songs have been covered by hundreds of artists all over the world, such as Faye Wong, Leslie Cheung, Jon Bon Jovi, Siti Nurhaliza, Shila Amzah, Katherine Jenkins, Im Yoon-ah, David Archuleta, Agnez Mo, Greek singer Nana Mouskouri, English vocal group Libera, Israeli singer Noa, Grammy Award-winning American musician Kenny G, New Zealand pianist Carl Doy, and Cuba's leading a cappella musical band Vocal Sampling, among others. Her songs are also featured in various international films, including Rush Hour 2, The Game, Prison On Fire, Year of the Dragon, Formosa Betrayed, Gomorrah, Crazy Rich Asians, and the Disney + TV series American Born Chinese.

In 1974, Teng entered the Japanese market, two years after Japan severed diplomatic ties with Taiwan. She was extremely popular in Japan throughout the 1970s and 1980s, having lived off her royalties in the country after semi-retiring in the late 1980s. During this tenure, Teng recorded and performed Japanese pop songs, often termed as kayokyoku by Japanese media, and helped connect Japan to much of East Asia, particularly Taiwan, China, and some of Southeast Asia, helping bridge the gap between them, some of which were later covered in Mandarin, as reported by Nippon.

Hirano Kumiko, an author at Nippon writes:

For Japanese, Teresa Teng was more than just a popular singer. By performing kayōkyoku, she connected Japan to its Asian neighbors. She taught us about the profundity of Chinese culture, whether in her birthplace of Taiwan, her ancestral home of China, or Hong Kong, which she loved throughout her life. We, her Japanese fans, will never forget her velvety voice and the brief, beautiful radiance of her life.

In 2007, Teng was inducted into the "Popular Music Hall of Fame" at the Koga Masao Museum of music in Tokyo, making Teng the only non-Japanese person to be inducted. In 2015, on an occasion to commemorate the 20th death anniversary of the singer, Akira Tada from Nikkei Asia wrote, "Asia has undergone significant changes in the past 20 years, with the flow of people, goods, and information having increased considerably. At the same time, new political frictions have developed. Teng, who continues to be loved across national and ethnic boundaries, still shines as a voice uniting Asia through song." In 2018, The Guardian wrote, "In 20th-century pop music, the voice of Elvis Presley is as iconic and identifiable in the west as that of Teresa Teng is in the east." According to Rolling Stone Philippines: "Teng's influence on Philippine music and pop culture has rekindled Filipinos' love for Mandopop across generations and communities throughout the Philippines." Andrew N. Weintraub and Bart Barendregt described her as "a model of inter-Asian modernity whose voice crossed linguistic, national and generational borders", whereas John F. Copper called her "the most heard singer in the world ever" during her time.

== Achievements and honors ==
Considered a "brilliant linguist" by The New York Times, Teng was named one of the world's seven greatest female singers by Time magazine in 1986. In a national survey by Japan Broadcasting Corporation (NHK) in 1997, her song "Toki no Nagare ni Mi o Makase" was voted number 16 among the 100 greatest Japanese songs of all time, while her The Moon Represents My Heart ranked first among the 10 best Chinese classics of the 20th century in a poll by Radio Television Hong Kong (RTHK) in 1999. In 2008, Teng was the only singer to be selected among China's 30 outstanding people in 30 years of reform and opening up. In 2009, to celebrate the 60th anniversary of the People's Republic of China, a government web portal conducted an online poll to choose "The Most Influential Cultural Figure in China since 1949". Over 24 million people voted, and Teng came out as the winner with 8.5 million votes.

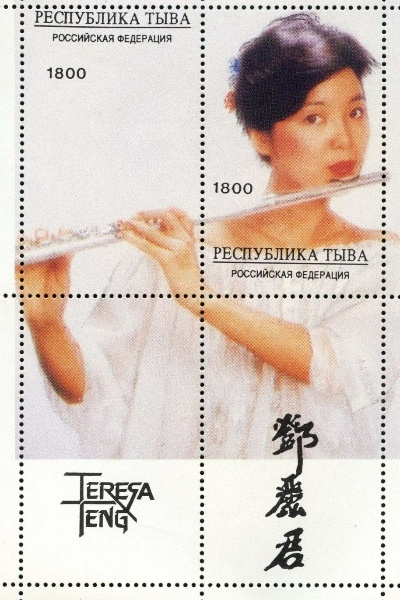
1996 Russian postal stamp from Tuva honoring Teng

In 2010, on the eve of "March 8th International Women's Day," she was named "the most influential woman in modern China" in a poll conducted by many well-known Chinese media from 1 March to 8 March. At the 2010 Chinese Music Awards, her song The Moon Represents My Heart was ranked first by critics among the 30 greatest Chinese musical works of the past 30 years. The same year, CNN listed Teng among the 20 most influential music artists of the past 50 years. In 2011, Teng's song The Moon Represents My Heart topped the online survey to celebrate the 100th anniversary of the founding of the Republic of China. The same year, China Internet Information Center ranked her second on its list of top 10 Chinese celebrities who died young. In 2012, Commonwealth Magazine placed Teng at number 19 on its 50 most influential people in Taiwan in the last 400 years, making her the highest-ranked performer on the list. On 21 September 2024, an Indo-Pacific Strategic Think Tank (IPST) in cooperation with Sankei Shimbun's polling company conducted a poll among 3,000 respondents in Japan on "Who is the most famous person in Taiwan?" Teng topped the poll, garnering 53.8% of the total votes. The poll was conducted across eight cities in Japan with respondents aged above 18.

The 1996 Hong Kong film Comrades: Almost a Love Story, directed by Peter Chan, features the tragedy and legacy of Teng in a subplot to the main story. The movie won Best Picture in Hong Kong, Taiwan, and at the Seattle International Film Festival in the United States. In 2007, TV Asahi produced a drama series entitled Teresa Teng Monogatari (テレサ・テン物語) to commemorate the 13th anniversary of her death. Actress Yoshino Kimura starred as Teng.

In 2002, Teng's commemorative statue was erected in Fushou Garden, Qingpu District, Shanghai. In 2010, a bronze statue was unveiled in Tuen Mun, Hong Kong, and another outside the Luzhou metro station in Taiwan on 25 June 2011. In 2015, a temple in Changhua County, Taiwan, erected a statue of the singer, honoring her as "Miaoyun Bodhisattva". That same year, the Daming County government in Handan City, Hebei province, China, built a "Lijun Town" dedicated to her. It renovated Teng's ancestral home to its original appearance. Her singing can be heard in every corner of the town. The city also features the "Teresa Teng Hanging Garden" and the "Teresa Teng Art Center", including a statue of the singer. Visitors can enjoy her music through artificial intelligence technology. On 8 November 2024, a monument dedicated to the singer was unveiled in Mishima, Fukushima, Japan, to mark the 30th anniversary of Teng's death the following year.

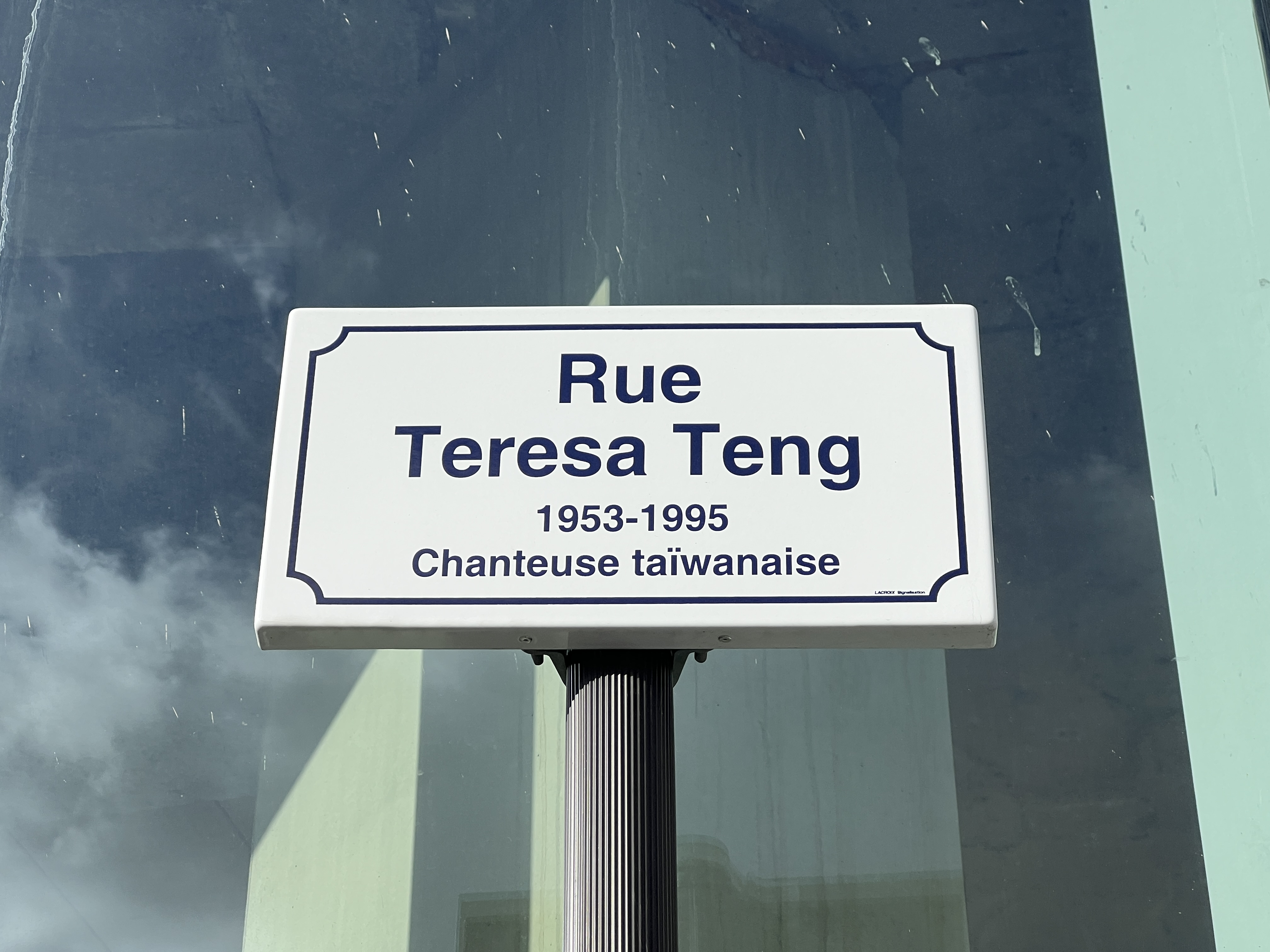
"Teresa Teng Street" in Ivry-sur-Seine, Grand Paris, France

On 29 January 2018, a Google Doodle was released across Japan, China, Taiwan, Thailand, Malaysia, Singapore, Indonesia, India, the Philippines, Australia, New Zealand, Sweden, Bulgaria and Iceland to honor Teng on what would have been her 65th birthday. To date, Teng's stamps have been issued by countries across the world, including Papua New Guinea, Timor, Sierra Leone, Argentina, Liberia, Tuva Republic of Russia, Abkhazia, Grenada, Sakha Republic of Russia, Batum, Japan, Guinea-Bissau, North Korea, and Republic of Mali, in addition to Taiwan, Hong Kong, and mainland China. Teng has a street in her name in Ivry-sur-Seine, Grand Paris. The name was adopted by the vote of the Municipal Council of France held on 17 February 2022.

== Personal life ==
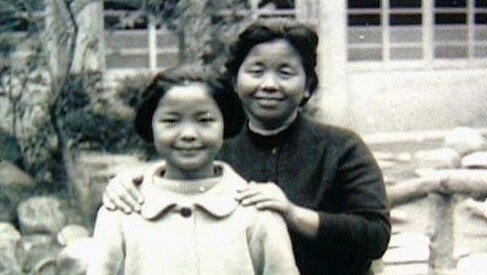
Teng with her mother, Chao Su-kuei (趙素桂), in 1960

Like her maternal grandmother Mary Chang (張守鑫), Teng grew up Roman Catholic. She was baptised at St. Joseph Catholic Church in Luzhou, where she spent much of her childhood playing around church. During this period, the church received foreign funding to support its missionary work and often distributed rice and flour to local residents. As part of these efforts, conversion to Christianity was encouraged, and Teng's family, along with many others in the community, adopted the Catholic faith. Later on, Teng became a Buddhist and spent her last six years living quietly in France.

In 1971, Teng met her first boyfriend, Lin Zhenfa (林振發), a Malaysian paper tycoon, and they soon fell in love. In 1978, he died of a heart attack. Later, Teng, accompanied by her close friends, went to the cemetery to pay respects to her boyfriend. In 1980, while in the US, Teng met Jackie Chan, who was filming in Hollywood. However, due to their personality differences, their relationship was short-lived and they parted ways.

In 1982, Teng was engaged to Beau Kuok, a Malaysian businessman and the son of multi-billionaire Robert Kuok. However, Beau's grandmother imposed several conditions on their union, including that Teng cease her career as an entertainer, as well as fully disclose her biography and all her past relationships in writing. However, Teng turned down the proposal, and the marriage was hence called off. In 1990, Teng met French photographer Paul Quilery in France, who was a friend of a guitarist in her band. They dated for five years and got engaged a month before Teng died on 8 May 1995.

== Discography ==
Mandarin albums (Note: List of Mandarin albums released under Polydor Records / Kolin Records)

- Goodbye My Love (1975)
- Drizzle of Tears (1976)
- Light Rain (1976)
- Love in Hong Kong (1977)
- Let Love Be More Beautiful (1978)
- A Love Letter (1978)
- Small Town Story (1979)
- Tian Mi Mi (1979)
- Zai Shui Yi Fang (1980)
- A Small Wish (1980)
- Yuan Xiangqing Nong (1980)
- If I Were for Real (1981)
- Love is Like a Song (1981)
- Shuishang Ren (1981)
- Dandan Youqing (1983)
- Messengers of Love (1984)
- Changhuan (1985)
- I Only Care About You (1987)

Cantonese albums

- Irreconcilable (1980)
- Strolling Down the Road of Life (1983)

Japanese albums

- Kuko / Yukigesho (1974)
- Yoru no Jokyaku / Onna no Ikigai (1975)
- Acacia no Yume (1975)
- Ai no Sekai (1976)
- Furusato wa Dokodesu Ka (1977)
- Anata to Ikiru (1977)
- Nesshou! Tokyo Yakei (1978)
- Kokoro ni Nokoru Yoru no Uta (1978)
- Kareinaru Nesshou (1979)
- Anata / Magokoro (1980)
- Jerusomina no Aruita Michi (1981)
- Tabibito (1983)
- Tsugunai (1984)
- Aijin (1985)
- Toki no Nagare ni Mi o Makase (1986)
- Intoxicating Tango (1986)
- Wakare no Yokan (1987)
- Roman Shugi (1989)
- 91 Kanashimi to Odorasete (1991)

== Filmography ==
=== Film ===
Year	English title	Chinese title	Notes
1970	Thank You, General Manager	謝謝總經理	Directed by Xie Junyi, starring Teresa Teng, Sun Yueh, and Liu Qing
1971	X+Y Is Love	X+Y就是愛	Directed by Xie Junyi, starring Teresa Teng and Yang Yang
1971	I Want to Sing	歌迷小姐	Directed by Wang Yisheng, starring Teresa Teng and Zhang Chong. Selected as one of the "Top Ten Most Popular Movie Stars" in Hong Kong that year
1972	Laugh When I See You	看見你就笑	Directed by Chen Hongmin, starring Teng as the lead role. Sang the theme song "Laugh when I see you"
1977	Love Rain Blooms	愛情雨開花	Guest star

=== Television series ===
Year	English title	Japanese title	Notes
1969–1985	It's 8 o'clock! Gather Around, Everyone	8時だョ!全員集合	Variety show
1977–1998	Drifters Big Laugh	ドリフ大爆笑	Variety show
1977–1979	Yanmar Family Hour Fly! Son Goku	"ヤンマーファミリーアワー飛べ!Sun Goku	Played the role of "Turashi Hime" in Episode 16 and 17
1985	The Kids Are Watching	子供が見てるでしょ!	Episode 7

== Awards ==
Teng received the following selected awards:

Japan:

- 1974: 16th Japan Record Awards: New Artist Award for "Kūkō" (空港)
- Japan Cable Awards: Grand Prix for "Tsugunai" (つぐない) in 1984: "Aijin" (愛人) in 1985; and "Toki no Nagare ni Mi o Makase" (時の流れに身をまかせ) in 1986. Teng's fourth Grand Prix for "Walare no Yokan" in 1988 was only for the All Japan Wired Cable Awards' year first-half award show (上半期)
- 1986: 28th Japan Record Awards: Gold Award for "Toki no Nagare ni Mi o Makase" (時の流れに身をまかせ).
- 1987: Japan Cable Awards: The Outstanding Star Award for "Wakare no Yokan" (別れの予感)
- 1987, 1988: The Cable Radio Music Award for "Wakare no Yokan".
- 1995: The Cable Radio Special Merit Award (有線功労賞) for three consecutive Grand Prix wins.

Taiwan:

- 1980: 15th Golden Bell Awards: Best Female Singer

Hong Kong:

- 1978: RTHK Top 10 Gold Songs Awards for "Siu Cyun Zi Lyun" (小村之戀)
- 1995: Golden Needle Award (posthumously)

== Notes ==
1. ^ Her birth name 鄧麗筠; Dèng Lìyún was commonly mispronounced "Dèng Lìjūn" (jūn is an alternative reading of the final character 筠), so she later adopted 鄧麗君; Dèng Lìjūn as her stage name, changing the final character, to match that pronunciation.
