= Shuidiao Getou =

Traditional Chinese melody

Shuidiao Getou (traditional Chinese: 水調歌頭; simplified Chinese: 水调歌头; pinyin: Shuǐdiào Gētóu) is the name of a traditional Chinese melody to which a poem in the Cí style can be sung. Different poets have written different lyrics to the melody which are usually prefixed by this melody's title, the Song dynasty poet Su Shi's work "Shuǐdiào Gētóu – Míngyuè Jǐshíyǒu " (水調歌頭·明月幾時有) being one of the most famous.

Cí (詞) is one of the literary genres that are unique to the Song dynasty, and can be sung to melody. Many ancient melodies are lost to history, but modern composers often compose new melodies for cí.

== History ==
"Shuidiao"(水調，"Melody of Water") is traditionally traced to that Emperor Yang of Sui who composed while digging the Bian River. Its original music was known for its mournful emotion. After entering the Tang dynasty, Shuidiao developed from a short song into a Daqu (大曲, "Grand Symphony").

The Song people cut the first section of the Shuidiao, namely the "Getou" (head of the song). But the melody forms were already different.

== Text of Su's poem ==
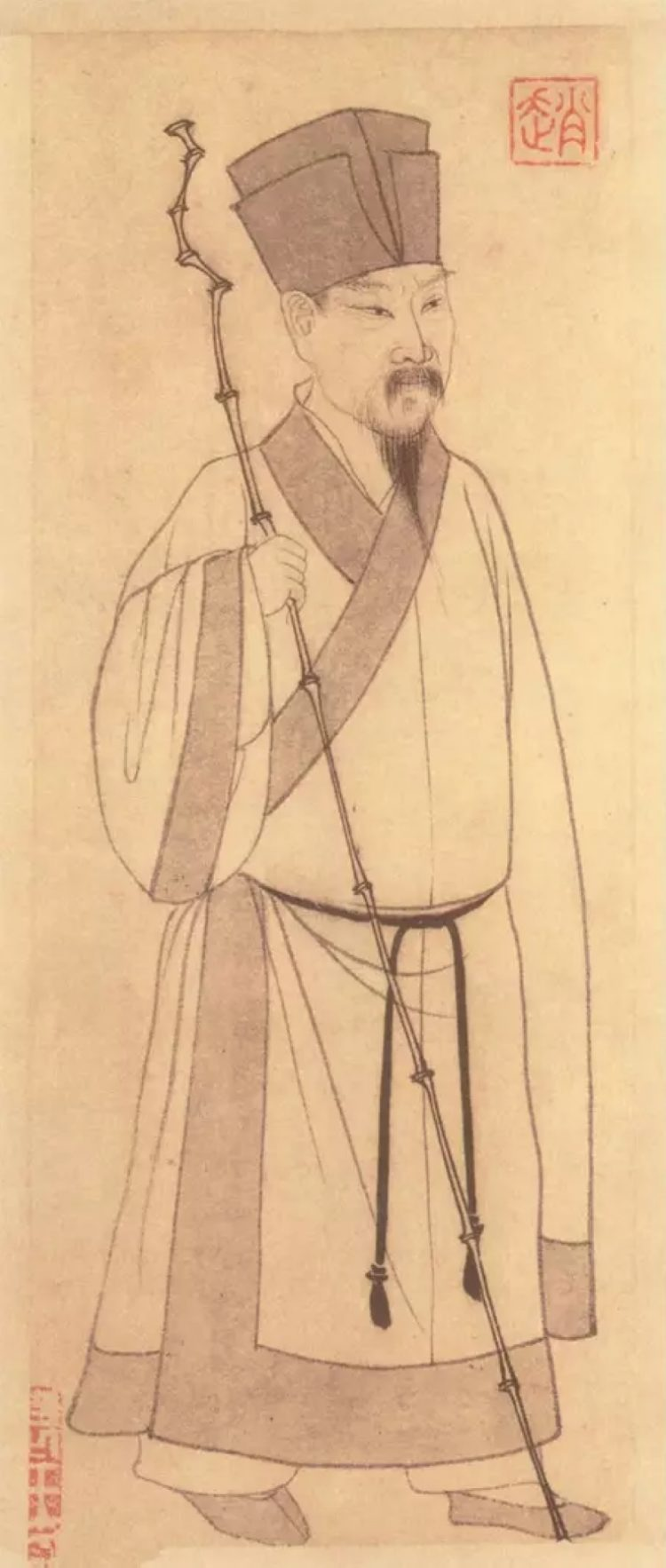
Su Shi.

| Original text in traditional Chinese | English translation |
|---|---|
| 水調歌頭^{1} | Water Melody |
| 丙辰^{2}中秋^{3}， 歡飲達旦， 大醉， 作此篇， 兼懷子由^{4}。 | Mid-autumn of the Bing Chen year Having been drinking happily over night I'm drunk So I write this poem Remembering my brother, Zi You |
| 明月幾時有？ 把酒問青天。 不知天上宮闕^{5}， 今夕是何年？ | When will the moon be clear and bright? With a cup of wine in my hand, I ask the clear sky. In the heavens on this night, I wonder what season it would be? |
| 我欲乘風歸去， 又恐瓊樓玉宇^{6}， 高處不勝寒。 起舞弄清影^{7}， 何似在人間^{8}！ | I'd like to ride the wind to fly home. Yet I fear the crystal and jade mansions are much too high and cold for me. Dancing with my moonlit shadow, It does not seem like the human world. |
| 轉朱閣^{9}， 低綺戶^{10}， 照無眠^{11}。 不應有恨， 何事長向別時圓？ | The moon rounds the red mansion, Stoops to silk-pad doors, Shines upon the sleepless, Bearing no grudge, Why does the moon tend to be full when people are apart? |
| 人有悲歡離合， 月有陰晴圓缺， 此事古難全。 但願人長久， 千里共嬋娟^{12}。 | People experience sorrow, joy, separation and reunion, The moon may be dim or bright, round or crescent shaped, This imperfection has been going on since the beginning of time. May we all be blessed with longevity, Though thousands of miles apart, we are still able to share the beauty of the moon together. |

== Notes on the poem ==
| | Characters | Pinyin | Jyutping | Explanation |
|---|---|---|---|---|
| 1. | 水調歌頭 | shuǐdiào gētóu | seoi2diu6 go1tau4 | The name of a tune. |
| 2. | 丙辰 | bǐngchén | bing2san4 | the ninth year of the reign of Song Emperor Shenzong (1076 C.E.), when Su Shi served as magistrate in Mi Prefecture, present-day Zhucheng county-level city in Shandong Province. |
| 3. | 中秋 | zhōngqiū | zung1cau1 | the Mid-Autumn Festival, on the fifteenth day of the eighth month (lunar calendar); a traditional Chinese holiday when people gather to enjoy the moon, drink wine, and eat moon cakes. |
| 4. | 懷 | huái | waai4 | to think of, miss. |
| | 子由 | Zǐyóu | Zi2jau4 | Su Zhe, courtesy name Ziyou, Su Shi's younger brother, also a famous author; at this time Su Zhe was in Jinan, Su Shi in Mi Prefecture; the brothers had not seen each other for seven years. |
| 5. | 宮闕 | gōngquè | gung1kyut3 | a spectacular palace. |
| 6. | 瓊樓玉宇 | qiónglóu-yùyǔ | king4lau4-juk6jyu5 | a building made of beautiful jade, here, the Moon Palace. |
| 7. | 弄 | nòng | nung6 | to play, to sport; here, "to dance". |
| | 清影 | qīng yǐng | cing1 jing2 | crisp, cold shadow in the moonlight. |
| 8. | 何似 | hé sì | ho4 ci5 | how can it compare to... |
| 9. | 朱閣 | zhū gé | zyu1 gok3 | a red pavilion. |
| 10. | 綺戶 | qǐ hù | ji2 wu6 | a door or window with carved patterns and designs. |
| 11. | 無眠 | wú mián | mou4 min4 | sleepless; here, refers to a sleepless person. |
| 12. | 嬋娟 | chánjuān | sim4gyun1 | may refer to either Chang'e, the goddess of the moon, or simply the moon itself. |

== In popular culture ==
In 1983, Liang Hong Zhi (梁弘誌) set Su's poem to new music as the song "Danyuan ren changjiu" (但願人長久; translated "Wishing We Last Forever" or "Always Faithful"). This new setting was recorded by Teresa Teng in her album dandan youqing (淡淡幽情), which also contained songs based on other poems from the Tang and Song dynasties. Later artists such as Faye Wong, Jacky Cheung and China Flowers (芳華十八) covered this song in albums and concerts.

== Other uses ==
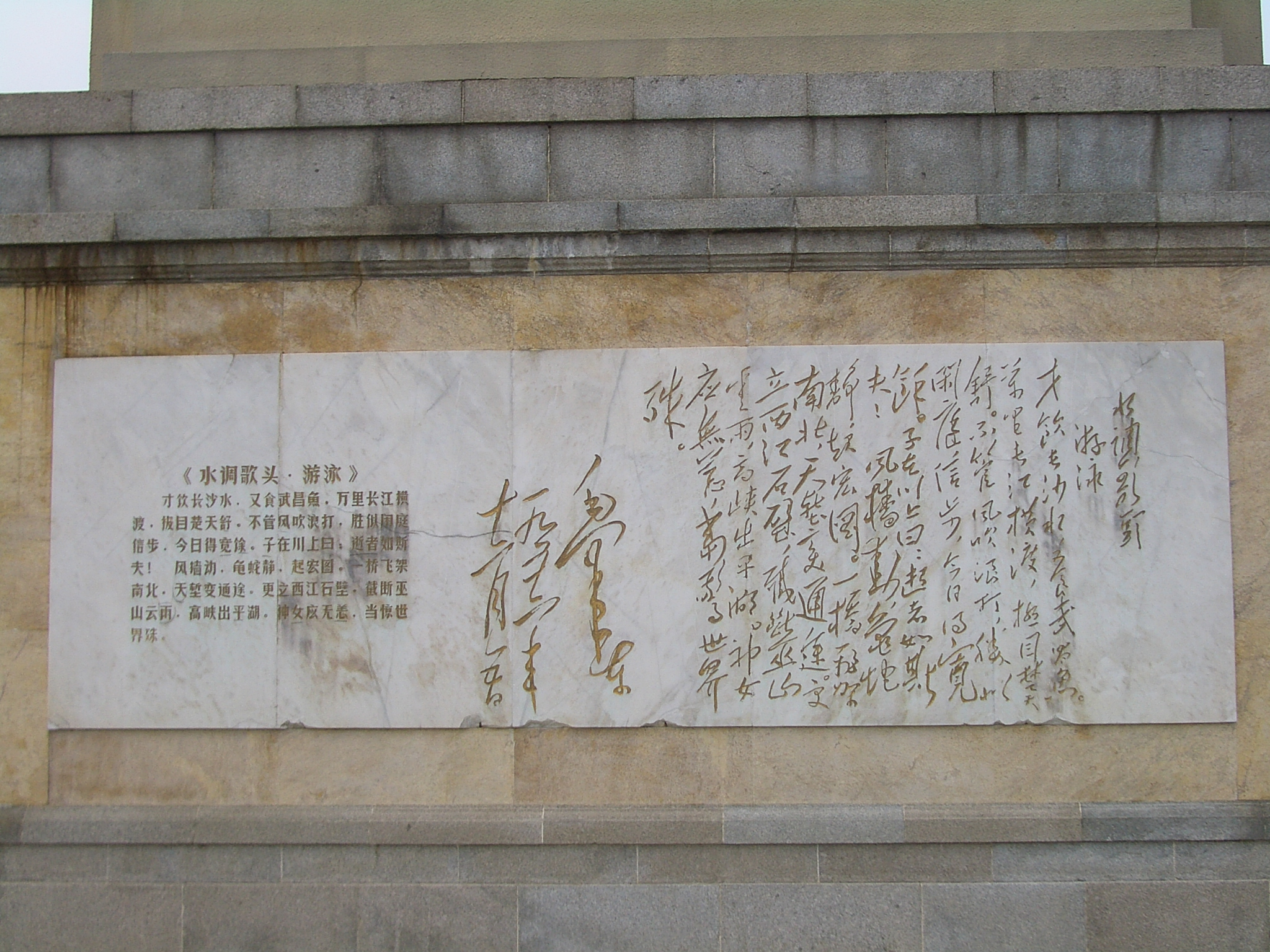
Mao's poem "Swimming" inscribed on a monument in Wuhan

In June 1956, Mao Zedong wrote the poem "Shuǐdiào Gētóu – Swimming" (水調歌頭·游泳) which is also rhymed to the tune of Shuǐdiào Gētóu.
