= Manojñaśuci =

- The deification of Teresa Teng
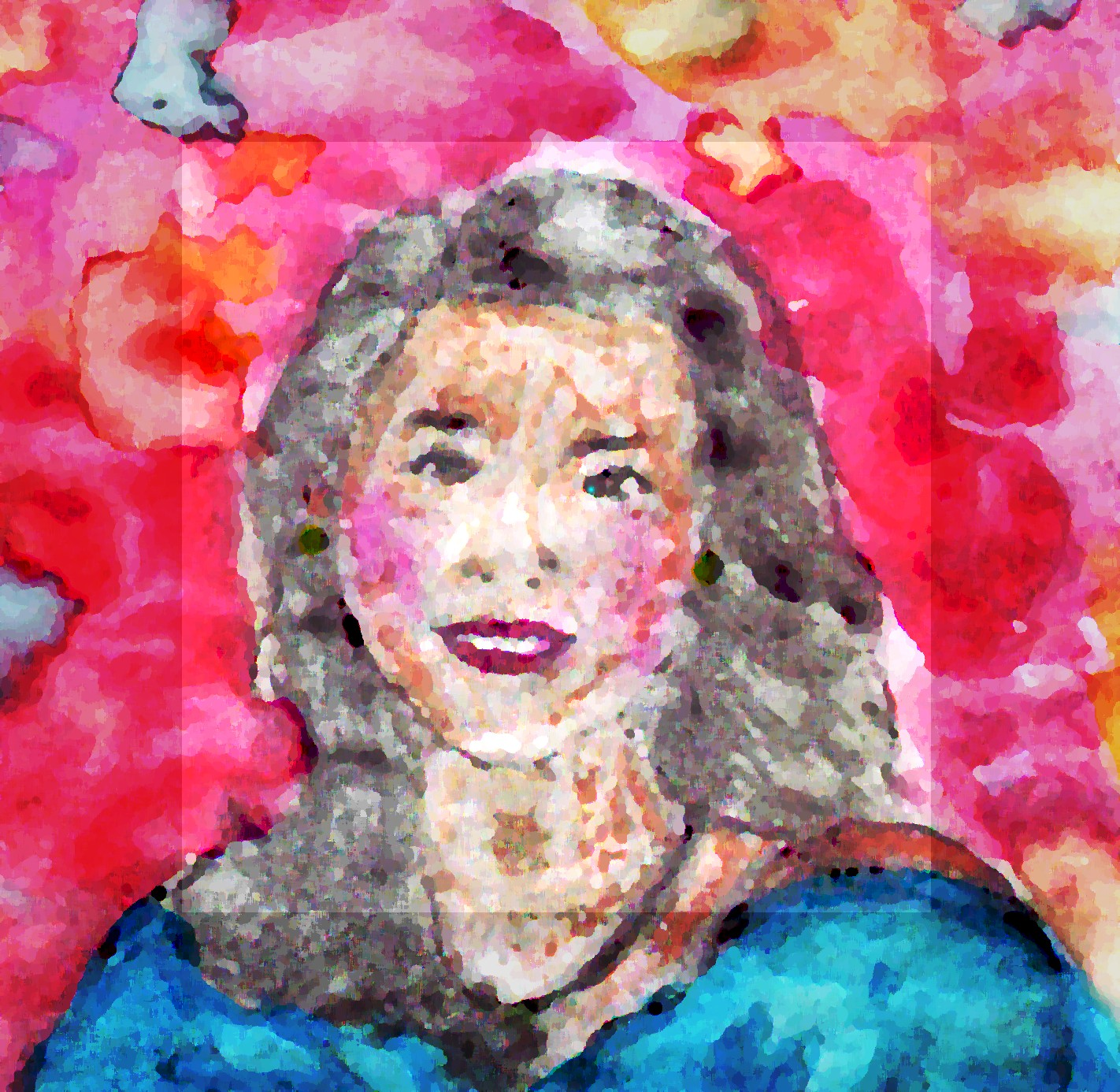
- Portrait painting of Manojñaśuci
- Chinese: 妙筠菩薩
- Affiliation: Bodhisattva
- Symbol: Microphone
- Gender: Female
- Region: Taiwanese folk religion
- Temple: Guangyi Temple

Genealogy
- Born: January 29, 1953; Baozhong, Yunlin, Taiwan
- Died: May 8, 1995 (aged 42); Chiang Mai, Thailand
- Parents: Teng Hsu (father); Chao Su-kuei (mother)

Manojñaśuci (Chinese: 妙筠菩薩) is the deification of Teresa Teng as a bodhisattva in Taiwanese folk beliefs. She was enshrined in Guangyi Temple (廣懿宮) in Erlin, Changhua, Taiwan.

== Iconography ==
Manojñaśuci is depicted as a singing woman wearing a black dragon-patterned qipao and holding a microphone, inspired by Teresa Teng's attire during her performances. She wears a red flower on her head and a pearl necklace around her neck.

== History ==
In 1999, Zhang Tingzhen (張庭禎), a clergy member of Guangyi Temple, performed a ritual for Teresa Teng in Chiang Mai, Thailand, thus establishing a connection with her. In 2005, Teresa Teng was granted the title of "Manojñaśuci". In 2013, Taiwanese female sculptor Hong Qionghua created two bronze statues for Manojñaśuci, one of which is enshrined in Guangyi Temple in Erlin, Changhua, while the other is located in Guangtai Temple in Bali, Indonesia. However, the creation of the Manojñaśuci statue was not communicated to the Teresa Teng Foundation, and Teng's family did not oppose placing her statue in the temple for worship.

On August 22, 2015, during the Ghost Festival ceremony held at Guangyi Temple, 5,000 tables of offerings were set up; the temple brought out the statue of Manojñaśuci for the devotees to pay their respects, including fans of Teresa Teng.
