= Life Records =

Malaysian record label

- Founded: 1949; 77 years ago
- Genre: Various
- Country of origin: Malaysia
- Location: Kuala Lumpur, Malaysia; Kowloon, Hong Kong; Singapore

Hup Hup Sdn Bhd, doing business as Life Records, is a Malaysian record label founded in 1949. It has subsidiaries in Hong Kong which founded in 1960 and Singapore which founded in 1966.

== History ==
According to the company itself it was officially established based in Malaya on 1949; 77 years ago as King's Musical Industrial Sdn Bhd, King's Musical Industries Limited and Hup Hup Sdn Bhd.

Subsidiaries in British Hong Kong (The Life Records Limited (Chinese: 麗風唱片有限公司)) was officially established based in Hong Kong on 1960; 66 years ago and Singapore (Life Record Industries Pte Ltd (Chinese: 丽风唱片工业（私人）有限公司)) was officially established based in Singapore on 1966; 60 years ago, according to the company.

According to the company it was the first Malaya–Hong Kong–Singapore licensee for international record labels including CBS, KAPP and MCA. Life's recording artists have included Teresa Teng and Frances Yip.

In this year, the factory in Singapore started production. The Singapore subsidiary was chaired by millionaire Aw Cheng Chye at that time, the parent company was chaired by Ng Lian Chin (simplified Chinese: 黄连振; traditional Chinese: 黃連振) and Life Records (Hong Kong) was exported to United Kingdom and United States. Life Records (Hong Kong) started to produce cassette tape that recorded directly from the original master recording.

== Artists ==
- Teresa Teng (鄧麗君)
- Frances Yip (葉麗儀)
- You Ya (尤雅)
- Qing Shan (青山)
- Lee Yee (李逸)
- Li Ya Ping (李亞萍)
- Yang Xiao Ping (楊小萍)
- Elaine Kang (江梦蕾)
- Huang Qing Yuan (黃清元)
- Kang Qiao (康乔)
- Xie Lei (謝雷)
- Mimi Gan (顏秋霞)
- Rebecca Pan (潘迪華)
- Tam Soon Chern (譚順成)
- Mary Xie (謝玲玲)
- Lisa Wong (麗莎)
- Vansalrang (萬沙浪)
- Chew Chin Yuin (邱清雲)
- Wong Foong Foong (黃鳳鳳)
- Yao Su Jung (姚苏蓉)
- Wong Shiau Chuen (黄晓君)
- Broery Marantika
