= Xu Pei =

Chinese female poet in Germany

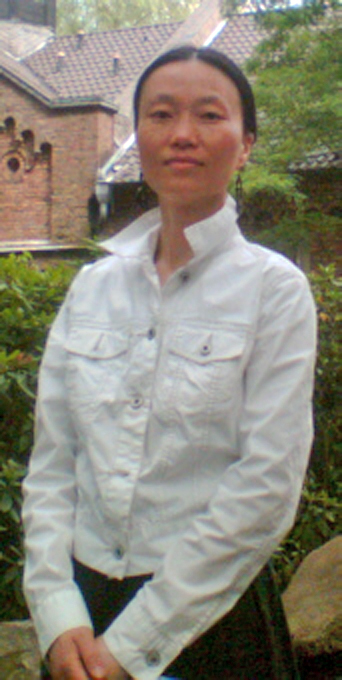
- Xu in 2006
- Native name: 徐沛
- Occupation: Poet, writer, human rights activist
- Notable works: German Poem Collection: Snow Woman (2003)

Xu Pei (born 1966) is a Chinese-born German poet, writer, and human rights activist. Born in Sichuan, she left China in 1988 and studied in Germany. Xu became a German citizen in 2004, and lives in Cologne, Germany.

== Life ==
Xu Pei was born on 22 March 1966 in Kangding City, the seat of the Garzê Tibetan Autonomous Prefecture in the Sichuan of Southwest China. Xu has three older brothers and one younger brother. In her childhood, Xu was sent to foster care in Chengdu. When she was 8 years old, her parents were transferred to work in Ya'an and Xu was taken back to her parents.

In 1983, Xu was admitted to the German Department at Sichuan International Studies University and graduated in 1987. Xu later worked in Leshan as a tour guide for German visitor groups.

Xu came to Germany at the end of 1988 and studied German philology and philosophy at the Heinrich Heine University in Düsseldorf, obtaining a PhD in 1996.

Xu obtained German citizenship in 2004 and currently lives in Cologne. She is a poet, writer, and human rights activist. Xu specializes in German poetry and published essays, commentaries and papers. She is active in radio and TV programs and on the Internet. She has worked with Amnesty International and the Society for Threatened Peoples.

== Works ==
Xu Pei's books have been illustrated by German artist Jörg Immendorf, Georg Baselitz and Markus Lüpertz, among others.

Xu Pei's 5 German Poetry Collections
year	Title name in German	Title name in English	ISBN
1993	Täglich reitet der Herzog aus	The duke rides every day	ISBN 3-928234-10-2
2001	Lotusfüße	Lotus feet	ISBN 3-933749-43-3
2002	Affenkönig	Monkey king	–
2003	Schneefrau	Snow woman	ISBN 3-89978-005-1
2008	Himmelsauge	Celestial eye	ISBN 978-3-934268-55-5

Xu's other German-language publications include: the essay The outlooks of Women in Romanticism Poems (ISBN ISBN 3-928234-57-9) published in 1997, as well as the novel The Long Way of the Red Chamber (ISBN 978-3-95445-015-2) published in 2013.

== Awards and reception ==
Xu Pei won Düsseldorf's Literary Creation Award in 1991, the Literary Creation Award of the Ministry of Culture of North Rhine-Westphalia in 1993, the Doctoral Scholarship of the Friedrich Ebert Foundation in 1994–1996, and the Heine Literature Creation Award in Lümborg in 1999–2000.

In an interview in 2011, the German sinologist Wolfgang Kubin commented that Xu Pei's poems were well written and her works of art deserved attention. Kubin said, unlike other overseas Chinese writers who focused on Chinese topics, Xu did not limit herself to Chinese topics.
