= Dandan youqing =

Album by Teresa Teng

Dàndàn yōuqíng

Studio album by Teresa Teng
- Released: 2 February 1983
- Recorded: 1982–1983
- Length: 39:26
- Language: Mandarin Chinese; Classical Chinese
- Label: Polydor

Teresa Teng chronology
Tabibito (1983)	Dàndàn yōuqíng (1983)	Tsugunai (1984)

Singles from Dandan youqing
- 1. "Wishing We Last Forever" Released: 2 February 1983

Dandan youqing
- Chinese: 淡淡幽情
- Literal meaning: Faint Quiet Feeling
Transcriptions
Standard Mandarin
- Hanyu Pinyin: dàndàn yōuqíng
- Bopomofo: ㄉㄢˋ ㄉㄢˋ ㄧㄡ ㄑㄧㄥˊ
- Gwoyeu Romatzyh: dann dann iou chyng
- Wade–Giles: tan^{4} tan^{4} yu^{1} ch'ing^{2}
- IPA: [tântânjóʊtɕʰǐŋ]
Yue: Cantonese
- Jyutping: daam6 daam6 jau1 cing4
- IPA: [taːm taːm jɐu tsʰɪŋ]
Southern Min
- Hokkien POJ: tām-tām-iu-chêng

Dàndàn yōuqíng (Chinese: 淡淡幽情) is a Mandarin Chinese studio album recorded by Taiwanese singer Teresa Teng, released on 2 February 1983. It was first distributed by Polydor Records from Hong Kong and Kolin Records from Taiwan. It contains twelve songs adapted from classical Chinese poems written during the Tang and Song Dynasties. The album experienced commercial success throughout Asia, selling over 5 million copies as of 2008 according to Xinhua News Agency.

== English names ==
Various sources translate the name of the album into different English-language names. The journal Chime: European Foundation For Chinese Music Research translates the name to Passionate Feelings. Sinorama (now Taiwan Panorama), Biographical Dictionary of Chinese Women: The Twentieth Century – 1912–2000, and Encyclopædia Britannica translate it to Faded Feelings. China Radio International translates it to Light Exquisite Feeling.

== Critical reception ==
In March 2012, Pu Xiqian from the China News Service called this album a "perfect match" of "outstanding" composition and ancient Chinese poems. One of producers of the album, Deng Xiquan, won the Best Record Producer Award at the 1983 RTHK Top 10 Gold Songs Awards.

== Commercial performance ==
The album received a platinum award from the International Federation of the Phonographic Industry Hong Kong (IFPIHK) in 1984. As of August 2008, the album has sold over 5 million copies, making it one of the best-selling albums in Asia.

== Track listing ==
Each of the following poems (詞牌) were written during the Tang dynasty to the Song dynasty.

=== Side A ===
1. "Alone in the West Tower" (獨上西樓; Du shang xi lou) – 2:45
  Music by Liu Chia-chang (劉家昌), arranged by Lu Dongni (盧東尼)
  Poem: "Grief" (哀思 ai si), segment of "Happy reunion" (相見歡 xiang jian huan) by Li Yu from Southern Tang
2. "Wishing We Last Forever" (但願人長久; Danyuan ren changjiu) – 4:06
  Music by Liang Hongzhi (梁弘志), arranged by Xiao Weichen (蕭唯忱)
  Poem："Water song" (水調歌頭 shui diao ge tou) by Su Shi (蘇軾) from Song era
3. "How Many Worries?" (幾多愁; Ji duo chou) – 3:33
  Music by Tan Jianchang (譚健常), arranged by Chen Yang (陳揚)
  Poem: "Papaver rhoeas [Corn poppy]" (虞美人 yu mei ren) by Li Yu from Southern Tang
4. "Ruthless Grass" (芳草無情; Fang cao wuqing) – 3:02
  Composed and arranged by Zhong Zhaofeng (鐘肇峰)
  Poem: "Basil garden" (蘇幕遮 su mu zhe) by Fan Zhongyan (范仲淹) from Song era
5. "Eternal Night" (清夜悠悠; Qing ye youyou) – 2:47
  Music by Gu Yue (古月), arranged by Lu Dongni (盧東尼)
  Poem: "Old friend from Taoyuan" (桃源憶故人 taoyuan yi guren) by Qin Shaoyou (秦少游) from Song era
6. "My Unexpected Feelings" (有誰知我此時情; You sheizhi wo zishi qing) – 3:52
  Music by Wong Jim, arranged by Joseph Koo
  Poem: "Partridge at the sky" (鷓鴣天 zhegu tian) by Nie Shengqiong (聶勝瓊) from Song era

Total length in Side A – 20:05

=== Side B ===
7. 胭脂淚
8. Music by Liu Jiachang (劉家昌), arranged by Ao Jinbao (奧金寶)
  Poem: "Night sounds" (烏夜啼 wu ye ti), segment of "Happy reunion" (相見歡 xiang jian huan) by Li Yu (李煜) from Southern Tang
9. "Sounds of Leaves" (萬葉千聲; Wan ye qian sheng) – 3:06
  Music by Liu Jiachang (劉家昌), arranged by Lu Dongni (盧東尼)
  Poem: "Jade House in Spring" (玉樓春 yu lou chun) by Ouyang Xiu (歐陽脩) from Song era
10. "Around the Evening" (人約黃昏後; Ren yue huanghun hou) – 2:45
  Music by Weng Qingxi (翁清溪), arranged by Lu Dongni (盧東尼)
  Poem: "" (生查子 sheng cha zi) by Ouyang Xiu from Song era
11. "Seeing Tears" (相看淚眼; Xiangkan lei yan) – 3:49
  Music by Gu Yue (古月), arranged by Chen Yang (陳揚)
  Poem: "雨淋鈴" (Yu lin ling) by Liu Yong (柳永) from Song era
12. "Remaining Silent" (欲說還休; Yu shuo huan xiu) – 2:50
  Music by Zhong Zhaofeng (鐘肇峰), arranged by Xiao Weichen (蕭唯忱)
  Poem: "Homely slave" (醜奴兒 chou nur) by Xin Qiji (辛棄疾) from Song era
13. "Thinking About You" (思君; Si jun) – 3:47
  Composed and arranged by Chen Yang (陳揚)
  Poem: "Separate Entities: I live in Yangtze River" (卜算子：我住長江頭 bu suanzi: wo zhu Chang Jiang tou) by Li Ziyi (李之儀) from Song era

Total length in Side B – 19:21

== Sales and certifications ==
Region	Certification	Certified units/sales
Hong Kong (IFPI Hong Kong)	Platinum	50,000^{*}
Summaries
Asia	—	5,000,000
^{*} Sales figures based on certification alone.
