= A Love Letter =

Studio album by Teresa Teng
- Released: December 21, 1978
- Recorded: 1978
- Genre: Mandopop
- Length: 38:31
- Language: Mandarin
- Label: Polydor

Teresa Teng chronology
Let Love Be More Beautiful (1978)	A Love Letter (1978)	Small Town Story (1979)

Singles from A Love Letter
- 1. "When Will You Return?" Released: December 21, 1978; 2. "A Love Letter" Released: December 21, 1978

A Love Letter (Chinese: 一封情書; pinyin: Yī fēng qíngshū) is a Mandarin studio album by Taiwanese recording artist Teresa Teng. It was released as her sixth studio album under Polydor Records Hong Kong on September 21, 1978. It features the songs "When Will You Return?", a cover of Zhou Xuan's song of the same name, and the titular track "A Love Letter".

== Release ==
The original LP version was first released on December 21, 1978, and was reissued on CD by Universal Music in 2005. An ultimate vinyl version released in 2013 uses the original Abbey Road studio master tape and comes with a limited edition Japanese CD.

== Reception ==
The album was certified platinum by the International Federation of the Phonographic Industry Hong Kong in 1981.

== Track listing ==
Side A
No.	Title	Length
1.	"A Love Letter" (一封情書)	3:26
2.	"Wǒ Shì Nǐ Zhīyīn" (我是你知音)	2:57
3.	"When Will You Return?" (何日君再來)	2:51
4.	"Yèsè" (夜色)	2:49
5.	"Xīnlǐ Mèng Lǐ" (心裡夢裡)	3:35
6.	"Ài Wǒ Xiàng Aihuā Yīyàng" (愛我像愛花一樣)	3:35
Total length:		19:13

Side B
No.	Title	Length
7.	"Wúqíng Huāngdì Yǒuqíng Tiān" (無情荒地有情天)	3:40
8.	"Jīntiān Huānlè Míngtiān Mèng" (今天歡樂明天夢)	4:03
9.	"River of Clouds" (雲河)	2:45
10.	"Hún Qiān Mèng Yě Xì" (魂牽夢也繫)	2:30
11.	"Wǎngshì Cháng Guàqiān" (往事常掛牽)	3:08
12.	"Yèlái Xiāng" (夜來香)	3:12
Total length:		19:18

== Credits and personnel ==
- Teresa Teng – vocals, composer
- George Kwan – art direction
- Alton Lee – design
- Katsuyuki Handa – engineer
- Tony Tang - producer, engineer, mixer
- Katsuyuki Handa – mixer
- Phoco – photography

== Certifications ==
Region	Certification	Certified units/sales
Hong Kong (IFPI Hong Kong)	Platinum	50,000^{*}
^{*} Sales figures based on certification alone.
