= Let Love Be More Beautiful =

Studio album by Teresa Teng
- Released: September 21, 1978
- Recorded: 1978
- Genre: Mandopop
- Length: 42:43
- Language: Mandarin
- Label: Polydor

Teresa Teng chronology
Love in Hong Kong (1977)	Let Love Be More Beautiful (1978)	A Love Letter (1978)

Singles from Let Love Be More Beautiful
- 1. "See the Chimney Smoke Rise Again" Released: September 21, 1978

Let Love Be More Beautiful (Chinese: 愛情更美麗; pinyin: Àiqíng gèng měilì), also titled Love Songs of the Island, Vol. 5: Let Love Be More Beautiful, is a Mandarin studio album by Taiwanese recording artist Teresa Teng. It was released as her fifth studio album under Polydor Records Hong Kong on September 21, 1978.

== Songs ==
The album's material contains many adaptations of Japanese songs. The single "See the Chimney Smoke Rise Again" (又見炊煙) is adapted from a Japanese folk song titled "Sato No Aki" (里の秋).

== Reception ==
The album was certified platinum by the International Federation of the Phonographic Industry Hong Kong in 1982.

== Track listing ==
Side A
No.	Title	Length
1.	"Nǐ Zhuāng Zuò Bù Zhīdào" (你裝做不知道)	3:32
2.	"Xiāng Jiàn Zài Míngtiān" (相見在明天)	4:33
3.	"Wǒ Bù Zài Míwǎng" (我不再迷惘)	3:18
4.	"Duōshǎo Límíng Duōshǎo Huánghūn Lǐ" (多少黎明多少黄昏裏)	3:59
5.	"Yuàn Nǐ Lái Kàn Wǒ" (願你來看我)	3:13
6.	"Nóng Qíng Wàn Lǚ" (儂情萬縷)	2:52
Total length:		21:27

Side B
No.	Title	Length
7.	"See the Chimney Smoke Rise Again" (又見炊煙)	2:50
8.	"Let Love Be More Beautiful" (使愛情更美麗)	4:13
9.	"Wǒ Xīn Shēn Chù" (我心深處)	3:47
10.	"Qīngsè de Huíyì" (青色的回憶)	3:08
11.	"Qíng Piāo Piāo" (情飄飄)	3:33
12.	"Yè de Tóuyǐng" (夜的投影)	3:45
Total length:		21:16

== Credits and personnel ==
- Teresa Teng – vocals, composer
- Zhuang Nu – lyricist
- Tony Tang – producer
- Rolan Szeto – cover artwork

== Certifications ==
Region	Certification	Certified units/sales
Hong Kong (IFPI Hong Kong)	Platinum	50,000^{*}
^{*} Sales figures based on certification alone.
