= Strolling Down the Road of Life =

Studio album by Teresa Teng
- Released: May 18, 1983
- Recorded: 1982–1983
- Genre: Cantopop
- Length: 45:54
- Language: Cantonese
- Label: Polydor

Teresa Teng chronology
Irreconcilable (1980)	Strolling Down the Road of Life (1983)

Singles from Strolling Down the Road of Life
- 1. "Strolling Down the Road of Life" Released: May 18, 1983

Strolling Down the Road of Life (Chinese: 漫步人生路; Jyutping: Maan Bo Yan Saang Lo) is the second Cantonese studio album recorded by Taiwanese singer Teresa Teng, released via Polydor Records on May 18, 1983. The album was supported with the single of the same name, which is a Cantonese remake of Miyuki Nakajima's 1980 single "Hitori Jouzu".

== Background and release ==
Strolling Down the Road of Life was released as Teng's second and final Cantonese-language album on May 18, 1983. In English, the album and title track are also alternately referred to as "Strolling Down the Path of Life" and "Walking Down the Road of Life", amongst other translations. The title track is a remake of Miyuki Nakajima's single "Hitori Jouzu" (ひとり上手), which was originally released on October 21, 1980, for her album Ringetsu (1981). The Cantonese lyrics were penned by Cheng Kwok-kong.

== Reception ==
Strolling Down the Road of Life was a commercial success, receiving a platinum certification by the International Federation of the Phonographic Industry Hong Kong (IFPIHK) in 1984. It became her fifth consecutive album to be awarded platinum, setting a record among all singers in Hong Kong. In 1985, Teng was awarded a special medal by PolyGram Hong Kong for having sold more than five million copies in the territory with all of her albums since 1975.

In a 2010 survey of Teng's greatest songs organized by the Teresa Teng Cultural and Educational Foundation, Pop Radio and more than 20 other radio stations, "Strolling Down the Road of Life" ranked at number 10 with 1.2% of the 20 million total votes. In 2011, the Guangdong Radio and Television and Music FM Radio Guangdong named "Strolling Down the Road of Life" one of the 30 greatest Cantonese songs in the past 30 years.

== Performances ==
Teng held six straight sold-out concerts at the Hong Kong Coliseum in December 1983 and January 1984 as part of her 15th Anniversary Concert Tour; it broke various records and played to a combined total audience of about 100,000 people. On New Year's Eve 2022, a hologram of Teng was created for New Year's countdown show in China, which was broadcast through Jiangsu Broadcasting Corporation. Chinese singer Zhou Shen appeared alongside the hologram and performed "Small Town Story" and "Strolling Down the Road of Life".

== Track listing ==
Strolling Down the Road of Life track listing (Note: English titles are unofficial translations)
No.	Title	Length
1.	"Strolling Down the Road of Life" (漫步人生路; Maan Bo Yan Saang Lo)	3:28
2.	"Rain in the East and Clear in the West" (東山飄雨西山晴)	3:25
3.	"How to Start" (怎麼開始)	5:09
4.	"Does Anyone Know How I Am Feeling" (有誰知我此時情)	3:49
5.	"Memories in the Rain" (雨中追憶)	3:27
6.	"Meeting an Old Flame" (遇見舊情人)	3:55
7.	"Starting Today" (從今日起)	3:50
8.	"Meeting You" (遇見你)	3:48
9.	"Can I See You One More Time" (可否多見一眼)	3:40
10.	"Who is Changing" (誰在改變)	4:02
11.	"Love Talk" (情話)	4:15
12.	"I Want You" (我要你)	3:06
Total length:		45:54

== Certifications ==
Region	Certification	Certified units/sales
Hong Kong (IFPI Hong Kong)	Platinum	50,000^{*}
^{*} Sales figures based on certification alone.
