= 91 Kanashimi to Odorasete =

91 Kanashimi to Odorasete ~New Original Songs~

Studio album by Teresa Teng
- Released: March 27, 1991
- Recorded: 1990–1991
- Genre: Pop
- Length: 45:27
- Language: Japanese
- Label: Taurus Records
- Producer: Takashi Miki; Koichi Morita; Ryuun Nagai; Yasushi Nakamura

Teresa Teng chronology
Roman Shugi (1989)	91 Kanashimi to Odorasete ~New Original Songs~ (1991)

Singles from 91 Kanashimi to Odorasete ~New Original Songs~
- 1. "Kanashimi to Odorasete" Released: February 27, 1991

91 Kanashimi to Odorasete (Japanese: 91 悲しみと踊らせて; English: 91 Let Me Dance With Sadness) is the final original Japanese studio album recorded by Taiwanese singer Teresa Teng, released via Taurus Records on March 27, 1991. The album was supported by the single "Kanashimi to Odorasete", which was made available as a CD single a month prior to the album's release. Teng enlisted various songwriters to write and produce the record, including Toyohisa Araki, Takashi Miki, Koichi Morita, and Michio Yamagami.

== Critical reception ==
A reviewer from CDJournal wrote that "Teresa Teng no longer needs the epithet 'so-and-so'. She is a world famous singer. Even in this collection of new original songs, you can fully hear her luster and vocals. Koichi Morita is a mismatch, but all of Takashi Miki's works are perfectly in sync with Teresa's charisma."

== Singles ==
"Kanashimi to Odorasete" was released as a CD single on February 27, 1991. The release contained "Nemonogatari o Kikasete" as the B-side as well as instrumental versions of both songs.

CD single track listing

1. "Kanashimi to Odorasete" (悲しみと踊らせて) – 4:20
2. "Nemonogatari o Kikasete" (寝物語を聴かせて) – 4:14
3. "Kanashimi to Odorasete" (Karaoke) – 4:20
4. "Nemonogatari o Kikasete" (Karaoke) – 4:14

== Track listing ==
91 Kanashimi to Odorasete ~New Original Songs~ track listing
No.	Title	Lyrics	Music	Arrangement	Length
1.	"Kanashimi to Odorasete" (悲しみと踊らせて)	Toyohisa Araki	Takashi Miki	Kei Wakakusa	4:20
2.	"Fuyuno Himawari" (冬のひまわり)	Toyohisa Araki	Takashi Miki	Makoto Kawaguchi	4:13
3.	"Fire of Love"	Tai	Tai	Godfrey Wang, Takayuki Hirano	4:37
4.	"Doukeshi" (道化師)	Toyohisa Araki	Takashi Miki	Takayuki Hirano	4:14
5.	"Cassiopeia" (カシオペア)	Michio Yamagami	Koichi Morita	Fujimaru Yoshino, Takayuki Hirano	5:08
6.	"Twilight Town" (トワイライト タウン)	Michio Yamagami	Koichi Morita	Fujimaru Yoshino, Takayuki Hirano	5:05
7.	"Nemonogatari o Kika Sete" (寝物語を聴かせて)	Toyohisa Araki	Takashi Miki	Hirohiro Hizawa, Takayuki Hirano	4:16
8.	"Aishi Aisarete" (愛し愛されて)	Ryuun Nagai	Ryuun Nagai	Makoto Kawaguchi	3:50
9.	"My Song"	Yasushi Nakamura	Yasushi Nakamura	Kei Wakakusa	5:08
10.	"Water Constellation" (Mizu no Seiza)	Toyohisa Araki	Takashi Miki	Makoto Kawaguchi	4:36
Total length:					45:27
