= Irreconcilable (album) =

Studio album by Teresa Teng
- Released: December 18, 1980
- Genre: Cantopop
- Length: 34:36
- Language: Cantonese
- Label: Polydor

Teresa Teng chronology
Irreconcilable (1980)	Strolling Down the Road of Life (1983)

Singles from Forget Him
- 1. "Wind and Frost Accompany Me" Released: December 18, 1980; 2. "Forget Him" Released: December 18, 1980

Irreconcilable (Chinese: 勢不兩立; Jyutping: Sai Bat Leung Laap) is the first Cantonese studio album recorded by Taiwanese singer Teresa Teng, released via Polydor Records on December 18, 1980. The album was supported with the single "Forget Him" (Chinese: 忘記他; Jyutping: Mong Gei Taa), which was written by Hong Kong media personality James Wong Jim.

== Reception ==
Irreconcilable was commercially successful after its release, receiving a platinum certification by the International Federation of the Phonographic Industry Hong Kong (IFPIHK) in 1981. That same year, James Wong won the Best Chinese Pop Song Award at the 4th Hong Kong Top Ten Chinese Golden Melody Awards for the album's title track.

== Promotion and live performances ==
Since then, "Forget Him" has become one of Teng's most popular Cantonese singles. She has performed it during the Teresa Teng Concert in Singapore National Theater in April 1981, and at her concerts at Queen Elizabeth Stadium in Hong Kong in 1982 and 1983. It was also performed during her 15th Anniversary Asian Tour Concert in Hong Kong at the end of 1983.

== Covers ==
Fifteen years later, the "Forget Him" was covered by Shirley Kwan, as part of her 1995 tribute album EX All Time Favourites. This new Dream pop version was featured in Wong Kar-wai's art house movie Fallen Angels (1995) as the Jukebox song number "1818." As the title suggested, the hitman played by Leon Lai wanted his accomplice, Michelle Reis, to forget him.

== Track listing ==
Irreconcilable track listing
No.	Title	Length
1.	"Wind and Frost Accompany Me" (風霜伴我行; Fung Seung Bun Ngo Hang)	3:28
2.	"Forget Him" (忘記他; Mong Gei Taa)	2:52
3.	"Syut Jung Ching" (雪中情)	2:41
4.	"Jat Seui Gaak Tin Naai" (一水隔天涯)	2:45
5.	"Sunflower" (向日葵; Heung Yat Kwai)	3:01
6.	"Ban Sing Yim" (檳城艷)	3:02
7.	"Ngo Sam Leui Bin" (我心裡邊)	3:25
8.	"The Day I Met You" (結識你那一天)	3:25
9.	"Yat Fai Yi Jau" (一揮衣袖)	3:45
10.	"Long Ji Sam Seng" (浪子心聲)	3:10
11.	"Seung Si Leui" (相思淚)	3:02
Total length:		34:36

== Certifications ==
Region	Certification	Certified units/sales
Hong Kong (IFPI Hong Kong)	Platinum	50,000^{*}
^{*} Sales figures based on certification alone.
