= Kokoro Biidama =

Single by Rythem

from the album Mugen Factory
- B-side: "M, Negai (Asayake ver.)"
- Released: March 1, 2006
- Genre: Pop
- Label: Sony Music Japan
- Songwriters: Yui Nītsu and Yukari Katō

Rythem singles chronology
"'20 Tsubu no Kokoro'" (2006)	"Kokoro Biidama" (2006)	"'Negai'" (2006)

"Kokoro Biidama" (ココロビーダマ) is the J-pop duo Rythem's ninth single. It was released on March 1, 2006, under Sony Music Entertainment Japan label. The title track was used as the sixth ending theme for the anime Yakitate!! Japan making this their second and last tie-in with the said anime series. This single peaked the #53 spot in the Oricon weekly charts.

The item's stock number is AICL-1732.

== Track listing ==
1. Kokoro Biidama
  Composition/Lyrics: Rythem
  Arrangement: CHOKKAKU
2. M
  Composition: Kaori Kishitani
  Lyrics: Kyoko Tomita
  Original singer: Princess Princess
3. Negai (Asayake ver.)
4. Kokoro Biidama (instrumental)
