= Negai =

Negai (Japanese 願い "wish") may refer to:

== Music ==
- "Negai" (ja), song by Kōzō Murashita 1986
- "Negai" (ja), song by Masatoshi Nakamura 1990
- Negai (B'z song) 1995
- Negai (Fayray song) 2004
- Negai (Rythem song) 2006
- "Negai", song by mihimaru GT
- "Negai", song by Kumiko (singer)
- "Negai", song by Masafumi Akikawa
- "Negai", song by Teruhiko Saigo cover of the same song by Kotaro Satomi
- "Negai", song by TiA
- "Negai", song by Yuka Terasaki
- Wish Negai (ja), album by Oyunaa

== Other ==
- Negai (satellite)
- Negai, Japanese adult visual game by Ram (company)

== See also ==
- Andrian Negai, footballer
