= Alice in Wonderland (disambiguation) =

Alice's Adventures in Wonderland (also known as Alice in Wonderland for short) is an 1865 novel by Lewis Carroll.

Alice in Wonderland may also refer to:

== Stage adaptations ==
- Alice in Wonderland (musical), 1886 musical by Henry Savile Clarke and Walter Slaughter
- Alice in Wonderland, 2006 opera by Peter Westergaard
- Alice in Wonderland (opera), 2007 opera by Unsuk Chin and David Henry Hwang
- Alice's Adventures in Wonderland (ballet) by Christopher Wheeldon (2011)
- Wonderland (musical) 2011 musical with music by Frank Wildhorn and lyrics by Jack Murphy
- Alice by Heart, 2012 musical with music by Duncan Sheik and lyrics by Steven Sater
- Wonder.land, 2015 musical with music by Damon Albarn and lyrics and book by Moira Buffini

== Film and television ==
- Alice in Wonderland (1903 film), silent motion picture
- Alice's Adventures in Wonderland (1910 film), silent motion picture
- Alice in Wonderland (1915 film), silent motion picture
- Alice in Wonderland (1931 film), motion picture
- Alice in Wonderland (1933 film), motion picture
- Alice in Wonderland (1949 film), part live action motion picture
- Alice in Wonderland (1951 film), Disney animated film
- Alice of Wonderland in Paris, 1966 animated movie
- Alice in Wonderland (1966 TV play), made-for-TV film by the BBC
- Alice in Wonderland or What's a Nice Kid like You Doing in a Place like This?, a 1966 animated television special
- Alice's Adventures in Wonderland (1972 film), musical motion picture
- Alice in Wonderland (1976 film), an erotic musical parody film
- Alice in Wonderland (1983 film), TV film based on Broadway play
- Fushigi no Kuni no Alice, 1983 anime adaptation
- Alice in Wonderland (1985 film), made-for-television film
- Alice (1988 film), stop-motion adaptation by Jan Svenkmajer
- Alice in Wonderland (1988 film), animated film
- Adventures in Wonderland, live-action television series
- Alice in Wonderland: A Dance Fantasy, a 1993 Czech ballet film
- Alice in Wonderland (1999 film), made-for-television film
- Alice in Wonderland (2005 film), Malayalam-language film
- "Alice in Wonderland", an episode of the TV series Super Why!
- Alice (miniseries) (2009), a modern interpretation TV miniseries broadcast on Syfy
- Alice in Wonderland (2010 film), Disney film directed by Tim Burton
- Once Upon a Time in Wonderland, a 2013 ABC spin-off of the TV series Once Upon a Time
- Alice Through the Looking Glass (2016 film), a 2016 sequel of the 2010 Disney film
- Alice's Wonderland Bakery

== Music ==
- Alice in Wonderland (EP), a 2005 EP by Alice Nine
- Alice in Wonderland (K3 album) (2011), or the title song
- "Alice in Wonderland" (song), the theme song to the 1951 film which has become a jazz standard
- "Alice in Wonderland", a song from Brian McFadden's 2008 album Set in Stone
- "Alice in Wonderland", a song written by Irving Berlin
- Alison Wonderland, an Australian DJ and producer
- Alice in Wonderland (Neuschwanstein album), 2008

== Video games ==
- American McGee's Alice, 2000, computer game
- Alice in Wonderland (1985 video game), for Apple II and Commodore 64
- Alice in Wonderland (2000 video game), a Game Boy Color game published by Nintendo
- Alice in Wonderland (2010 video game), a multi-platform game based on Tim Burton's Alice in Wonderland

== Other literature ==
- Miyuki-chan in Wonderland, 1995, manga series
- Alice 19th, manga by Yū Watase

== Other uses ==
- Alice in Wonderland (franchise), Disney franchise
  - Alice in Wonderland (Disneyland attraction)
- Alice in Wonderland syndrome, disorienting hallucinatory condition

== See also ==
- Malice in Wonderland (disambiguation)
- All pages with "Alice" and "Wonderland" in their title
- Films and television programmes based on Alice in Wonderland
- Works based on Alice in Wonderland
- Curiouser and Curiouser (disambiguation)
