= Mangekyō Kirakira =

Single by Rythem

from the album Utatane
- B-side: "Rapunzel"
- Released: May 26, 2004
- Genre: Pop
- Label: Sony Music Japan

Rythem singles chronology
"'Hitoritabi Shararuran'" (2004)	"Mangekyō Kirakira" (2004)	"'Houki Gumo'" (2005)

"Mangekyō Kirakira" (万華鏡キラキラ) is the J-pop duo Rythem's fifth single. It was released on May 26, 2004 under Sony Music Entertainment Japan label. The title track was used as the theme song for Nippon Television's drama entitled Hikari to Tomo ni... ~Jiheishouji wo Kakaete~. This single was able to reach the #13 spot in the Oricon Singles Chart, making it Rythem's second most successful single to date.

The item's stock number is AICL-1534.

== Track listing ==
1. Mangekyō Kirakira
  Composition/lyrics: Rythem
  Arrangement: Chokkaku
2. Rapunzel
  Composition/lyrics: Rythem
  Arrangement: Chokkaku
3. Mangekyō Kirakira (instrumental)
4. Rapunzel (instrumental)
