= Malicious =

Malicious may refer to:

== Films and video games ==
- Malicious (1973 film) (Malizia), an Italian comedy starring Laura Antonelli
- Malicious (1995 film), an American thriller starring Molly Ringwald
- Malicious (2018 film), an American horror film starring Delroy Lindo
- Malicious (video game), a 2010 download-only 3D action game

== Thoroughbred race horses ==
- Malicious (horse), foaled 1927
- Malicious, winner of the 1964 Jim Dandy Stakes
- Malicious III, winner of the 1965 Evening Attire Stakes

== See also ==
- Malice (legal term)
- Malice (disambiguation)
- Malware
