= Malice in Wonderland =

Malice in Wonderland may refer to:

== Film ==
- Malice in Wonderland (1982 film), a 1982 experimental animated short film by Vince Collins
- Malice in Wonderland (1985 film), an American TV movie starring Elizabeth Taylor and Jane Alexander
- Malice in Wonderland (2009 film), a British fantasy adventure film
- Malice in Wonderland: The Dolls Movie, a 2011 American comedy starring the drag theater troupe The Dolls

== Television ==
- "Malice in Wonderland", January 18, 1959 episode of Omnibus, starring Keenan Wynn
- "Malice in Wonderland" (Charmed), October 2, 2005 episode of television series Charmed
- "Malice in Wonderland!", August 16, 2007 episode of Pokémon: Diamond and Pearl

== Music ==
- Malice in Wonderland (band), a Norwegian hard rock band
- Malice in Wonderland (Nazareth album)
- Malice in Wonderland (Paice Ashton Lord album), or the title song
- Malice n Wonderland, an album by Snoop Dogg
- Malice in Wonderland (Goldie album), an album by Goldie
- "Malice in Wonderland", a single by Pants & Corset

== Books ==
- Malice in Wonderland (novel) by Nicholas Blake
- Malice in Wonderland: My Adventures in the World of Cecil Beaton (2021), biography by Hugo Vickers

== See also ==
- Alice in Wonderland (disambiguation)
- Malice (disambiguation)
