= Love Call =

Love Call may refer to:

- Love Call (album), a 1968 album by Ornette Coleman, or the title track
- "Love Call" (Rythem song), 2008
- "Love Call", a 2024 single by Shiyui
- "Love Call", a 2024 single by @onefive
- "Love Calls" (song), a 2002 song by Kem
- Love Calls, a 1968 album by Eddie "Lockjaw" Davis with Paul Gonsalves
