= List of Yakitate!! Japan episodes =

Promotional TV Tokyo poster featuring the main cast.

This is the complete list of all episodes from Japanese anime, Yakitate!! Japan, directed by Yasunao Aoki. It is based on a manga by Takashi Hashiguchi. It first aired in Japan from October 12, 2004, to March 14, 2006, and spanned a total of 69 episodes. The anime concluded before the manga, and thus the ending is non-canon.

== Episode list ==
=== Pantasia Newcomers Battle Arc ===
No.	Title	Directed by	Written by	Original air date
1	"Arrival! The Boy with Solar Hands!"; Transliteration: "Kita zo!! Taiyō no te o motsu shōnen!" (Japanese: 来たぞッ!! 太陽の手を持つ少年！)	Teruo Satō	Katsuyuki Sumisawa	October 12, 2004
Azuma Kazuma is an aspiring baker who has left his small town for Tokyo to fight for his dream of making a bread for all Japan. The story starts when Azuma is 5, living in the country with his grandfather, a rice farmer, and his sister. Although his family only eats rice, Azuma's sister wishes to eat bread for once and convinces Azuma to visit a bakery she frequents. While Azuma learns the deliciousness of bread, Azuma's grandfather refuses to acknowledge bread unless it can complement his regular Nattō and miso soup. Azuma speaks with the baker of the dilemma, and he provides Azuma with a special ingredient for his bread. Upon working together, the baker finds that Azuma has the legendary "Solar Hands", naturally warmer hands that knead better than average though. With Azuma's hands, and the man's ingredient, Azuma's grandfather concedes defeat and accepts bread as part of the household. The baker reveals that his ingredient was soybean milk, which helped the bread fit better with his grandfather's desired sides. To Azuma's surprise, the man closes his shop to travel the world in hopes of creating a bread unique to Japan and inspires Kazuma to make his Ja-Pan to reach the goal. 10 years later, he travels to Tokyo to compete in the Pantasia recruitment competition, to try to be accepted to Pantasia, the best bakery in Japan. The test uses a 10 point system, but Azuma immediately loses 5 points due to being late...
2	"Maharajah! The Day of Mount Fuji Descent!"; Transliteration: "Maharaja!! Fujisan ga futte kita hi!" (Japanese: マハラジャッ!! 富士山が降ってきた日!)	Tarō Iwasaki	Katsuyuki Sumisawa	October 19, 2004
At the beginning of the episode, Azuma quickly loses another 2 points for his hair being messy & another 2 for (inadvertently) insulting the examiner, bread critic Ryou Kuroyanagi. He is given a hairband by Tsukino, another entrant to fix his hair. Azuma then meets Kawachi Kyosuke, another applicant. Compared to Azuma, who is relatively simple and has only ever made Ja-pan, Kawachi is quite knowledgeable about bread. As he sees Azuma kneading his bread, he determines that Azuma has the Solar Hands. After tasting a sample of Azuma's bread, he realizes that Azuma is strong competition and must lose quickly. While Azuma is preparing his dough, he rolls a rolling pin behind Azuma, which Azuma slips on, ruining original dough. The strongest competitors otherwise are Kai Suwabara, a croissant specialist and Tsukino who have zero point deductions. Azuma, however, rebounds with a Mount Fuji-shaped bread, which Kuroyanagi identifies by taste as Naan, and is awarded 2 points, the best evaluation amongst the entrants.
3	"Burnt Black! Is This The Ultimate Kurowa?!"; Transliteration: "Kurokoge!! Kore ga kyūkyoku no kurowa-san!?" (Japanese: 黒コゲ!! これが究極の黒輪さん!?)	Hiroshi Ishiodori	Tetsuko Takahashi	October 26, 2004
The competition is down to four finalists – Azuma, Kawachi, Suwabara, and Tsukino. Their challenge is to bake a croissant, but as revealed at the end of the previous episode, Azuma mistakenly believes the challenge to be finding a man named Kurowa (a play on the reading of croissant in Japanese). Azuma and Kawachi agree to bake one together in secret even though it's against the rules, and Azuma opts to withdraw after learning that Kawachi needs the job to support his orphaned, impoverished family.. Azuma realizes that he has made a similar Japan, Japan 43. When Kawachi tells him that a standard croissant is 54 layers, Azuma says that this is too little, and that it should be 324 layers, which would be burnt to a crisp if baked. However, there is a secret behind the bread, and Kawachi reluctantly agrees to make it. It's the day of the finals, and Azuma is missing. At the time of presentation, Azuma quietly withdraws, while Tsukino is revealed to be the granddaughter of Pantasia's owner, and the owner of the Southern Tokyo Branch. Kawachi beats Suwabara with Azuma's croissant, but, out of guilt withdraws as well, leaving Kai the victor. Despite this, both he and Azuma are hired by Tsukino and the Southern Tokyo Branch.
4	"Heheeh! Make A Delicious Bread!"; Transliteration: "Hihīn! Umai pan o tsukure!" (Japanese: ヒヒーン!! 馬味いパンを作れ!)	Kiyoshi Fukumoto	Akatsuki Yamatoya	November 2, 2004
It's Azuma and Kawachi's first day of work at the Southern Tokyo Branch of Pantasia. Tsukino, their new supervisor, teaches Kazuma how to make French bread. When they hear that the manager, afro-sporting Ken Matsushiro, must sample it before it can be sold in the bakery, they seek him out at a horse race track. Instead of tasting the bread, he throws it to a horse, who will eat it or reject it. He tells the two of them to make a bread delicious enough to be eaten by a horse. When they return to the store, Tsukino tells them his story – his sister nearly died from eating his bread because of an unknown allergy to dairy. He therefore aims to make a bread that anyone, even someone with allergies, can eat. Horses will eat this type of bread because although they love wheat, they hate butter and dairy products.
5	"Delicious! A Decisively Ultimate Butter!"; Transliteration: "Umee!! Kimete wa kyūkyoku no batā!" (Japanese: 美メェ～ッ!! 決め手は究極のバター!)	Kiyoshi Ōta	Akatsuki Yamatoya	November 9, 2004
Azuma and Kawachi are attempting to create a bread that tastes delicious, but has no possible allergens like butter and milk, and their job is on the line. Azuma calls his sister, who suggests (and brings) the exact ingredient to help him stay at the store – goat's milk, which Azuma makes into butter. Kawachi uses oats in his bread, and the horse accepts it. However, when fed Azuma's bread, the horse strongly rejects it. Ken and Kawachi eat Azuma's bread, and find it to be delicious. As well, the goat's milk that Azuma used eliminates the main allergen in milk, making it a bread that fits the manager's request. Both Azuma and Kawachi keep their jobs.
6	"It's The Main Store! Dancing Meister!"; Transliteration: "Honten da!! Odoru maisutā!" (Japanese: 本店だ!! 踊るマイスター!)	Shinichi Masaki	Kento Shimoyama	November 16, 2004
Azuma and Kawachi are wondering why the store doesn't get more customers when the main store has lines dragging on and on. When they ask Ken, he points out that the main branch of St. Pierre, a rival bakery, is across the street. Soon, they meet the manager, a very effeminate man (it is strongly insinuated that he is gay) named Mokoyama, who is about to release St. Pierre's new line of bread. However, Ken tells Mokoyama Azuma is a much better baker, and he challenges the St. Pierre branch to a duel: Azuma's newest Japan against his new line. St. Pierre accepts, but the main Pantasia branch knows nothing about the challenge, or Azuma's new Japan, and their entire reputation is resting on their newest employee – especially since the duel will be broadcast on television.
7	"Hattori Surprise! Transformation With The Secret Sauce!"; Transliteration: "Bikkuri Hattori!! Himitsu no tare de henshin ja!" (Japanese: びっくり服部!! 秘密のタレで変身じゃ!)	Megumi Yamamoto	Tetsuko Takahashi	November 23, 2004
The Bread Duel begins. Mokoyama unveils his new bread first, a pudding-filled Kouign-amann. It is made using the highest quality ingredients, and all of the judges give it a perfect score. Then, it's Azuma's turn. His bread, which is fried, seems to go over well with the judges; he took leftover bread and fried it in a special sauce similar to a rice cracker. However, the judges note that it is made from leftovers, and that people will not want to eat it. In the nick of time, the mysterious general manager of the main branch, Meister Kirisaki appears, and asks the judges to take price into consideration. Mokoyama announces that the price of his bread will be 190 yen, only slightly higher than a normal butter roll, which is a good deal because of the high-quality ingredients. Then Azuma declares his price – 0 yen. This excites the crowd, and the judges give his bread a perfect score as well – it's a draw.
8	"Kawachi (rev)! Solar Gauntlets!"; Transliteration: "Kawachi (kai)!! Taiyō no gantoretto!" (Japanese: 河内(改)!! 太陽のガントレット!)	Tarō Iwasaki	Akatsuki Yamatoya	December 7, 2004
An invitation is sent to the two newest members of the Southern Tokyo Branch, for the annual "Newcomers Competition" – a tournament of every Pantasia newcomer. Their preliminary challenge is to make dinner bread that will last for three weeks without growing mold. Azuma automatically thinks of a previous Ja-pan, and offers to help Kawachi make it with him. However, Kawachi wants to do it on his own this time, so Tsukino suggests helping him get the legendary solar hands. Although confused as to how, Kawachi accepts the challenge. The special training is swimming – Kawachi is to swim many laps in a pool, with weights around his stomach. Kawachi goes into training, while Azuma decides to go to Izu to get an ingredient... by running. Izu is 3-5 hours away by train.
9	"I Won't Lose! I Challenge You With My Osaka Pan!"; Transliteration: "Makehen!! Ōsaka pan de shōbu ya!" (Japanese: 負けへん!! 大阪パンで勝負や!)	Tōru Yamada	Katsuyuki Sumisawa	December 14, 2004
The newcomer duet is still working on their bread for the competition. Kawachi is in intense training to increase his muscle mass and obtain Solar Gauntlets. Azuma, understandably, faints on his way to Izu, but finds what he needs at a sushi restaurant he collapses near – wasabi. Meanwhile, Kawachi is trying to find his ingredients, so he can fulfill his deceased father's dream of working at the main branch of Pantasia, but feels sorry for himself. Ken Matsushiro tells him to stop being such a baby by dumping his liquor on him. Ken actually intended to give Kawachi the idea of using alcohol in his bread, and Kawachi gets the idea, making his Osaka-pan. Similarly, Azuma also passes after being inspired to use wasabi in his loaf after trying the restaurant's wasabi rolls.
10	"Each One's Opening Curtain! Pantasia Newcomers Battle Begins!"; Transliteration: "Sorezore no kaimaku!! Pantajia shinjin-sen kaishi!" (Japanese: それぞれの開幕!! パンタジア新人戦開始!)	Kazuhide Tomonaga	Katsuyuki Sumisawa	December 21, 2004
Kazuma and Kyousuke had made it past the preliminary rounds. Kazuma had finished creating his "secret weapon" with the help of Grandpa Umasaburou and baked his ultimate Japan #44 to thank him. The day of Pantasia Newcomers Battle has finally arrived, but Kazuma overslept. He barely made it and Kuroyanagi scolds him by shouting "You're late!! That's 5 points off!!" but retracts the statement as they bakers were now competing directly against each other than relying on a point system. The tournament is interrupted by a group of bakers that had failed the test, leading to Kuroyanagi unveiling all their failed, moldy loaves. Kazuma, however, defends the rejected bakers, and Kuroyanagi sarcastically replies that he will admit anyone that would eat their failed creation. One of the chefs, Katsuo Umino tries to take Kuroyanagi on his offer, but is stopped by Kazuma, and Kuroyanagi is forced to accept Katsuo back into the competition.
11	"Garbage And Trash! Kazuma Selected The Worst Possible Butter!"; Transliteration: "Kuzukasu!! Kazuma ga eranda saitei batā!" (Japanese: クズカスッ!! 和馬が選んだ最低バター!)	Yoshito Hata	Toshifumi Kawase	December 28, 2004
For the preliminary round, Kuroyanagi orders the bakers to make him a butter roll and prepares multiple blocks of marked butter for the competition. Kazuma picks one of the random blocks out of whim, which some bakers believe to be the winning choice after having Kazuma's televised battle with Mokoyama. Katsuo, however, picks his butter by scent, while Kawachi waits until the butters begin melting at room temperature before correctly finding that the higher quality butter would not melt. Before Kuroyanagi can give his assessment, Kazuma finishes only minutes after the contest is declared and is forced to take a seat. Once the others finish however, Kuroyanagi marks both Katsuo and Kawachi's butters to be qualifying ingredients, but Kazuma's choice is actually margarine and is thus disqualified without tasting.
12	"Kazuma Disqualified?! Resurrection From The Brink Of Death By Ultra C!"; Transliteration: "Kazuma shikkaku!? Kishikaisei no urutora C" (Japanese: 和馬失格!? 起死回生のウルトラC)	Kiyoshi Ōta	Toshifumi Kawase	December 28, 2004
Kazuma's choice causes a riot amongst the bakers as some blamed him for leading them astray, but Kai steps in and defends Kazuma and persuades Kuroayanagi to try Kazuma's unusually fast roll. To his surprise, while Kazuma failed the ingredient test, his butter roll was still exceptionally tasty thanks to flash baking, baking his dough at a higher temperature for a better crust and fluffier interior. To prevent an outcry of having to taste the margarine rolls, Kuroyanagi allows the remaining margarine bakers to decide a winner through rock-paper-scissors. Following the battle, Kazuma is scouted by Tsukino's younger half-sister Mizuno, leading to a tense argument and Tsukino attempting to slap Mizuno. After being taken to the back, Ken explains to Kazuma and Kyosuke about the succession crisis between Tsukino and her sisters, including Mizuno, and the pair promise to support Tsukino. Mizuno also sets up a gamble in which if Kazuma loses to her, he will have to transfer to Mizuno's new Tokyo Pantasia branch, however should Kazuma win, Mizuno has to begin respecting Tsukino as her older sister.
13	"Sorry For The Wait! Falling down drunk Melon Bread!"; Transliteration: "Hei omachii!! Meron pan de meronmeron!" (Japanese: ヘイお待ちィ!! メロンパンでメロンメロン!)	Shinichi Masaki	Akatsuki Yamatoya	January 11, 2005
Kazuma had made a bet with Mizuno, Tsukino's sister but he's totally clueless on baking melon buns, a specialty of Mizuno's New Tokyo Branch. The sushi shop owner whom Kazuma met when he fainted arrived at the main branch to treat them to some sushi. While observing him, Kazuma got an idea on how to create Japan 58, Melon Sushi Bun and asked Tsukino out to help buy ingredients. For their battle, Mizuno uses the highest quality melon to create the cookie dough for her bread but Kazuma is awarded the victory after baking his melon bread's bread and cookie doughs separately before gluing them together with a melon paste like sushi. Mizuno refuses to admit defeat and brings in her new helper, the masked Mr. Koala to defeat Kazuma.
14	"Delicious! The Trap Of The Yakisoba Bread!"; Transliteration: "Umeen!! Yakisoba pan no otoshiana!" (Japanese: 美麺～ッ!! 焼きそばパンの落とし穴!)	Kazuhide Tomonaga	Katsuyuki Sumisawa	January 18, 2005
In the mean time, Kawachi wins his melon bun match, but only after trying his best after receiving a huge scare from Matsushiro. Shachihoko of the Nagoya Branch, Azuma's next opponent is introduced, as well as the next theme for the next round, which is yakisoba bread with pre-made buns with an extra cash prize for the top performing yakisoba bread. To train the pair, Ken sends the pair to his fight buddy, Ryuu's Chinese restaurant for wok frying training. While Kawachi is adept thanks to having to cook regularly for his siblings, Kazuma's completely inept while Ryuu brings out an article showing Shachihoko's skill in frying and his special yakisoba.
15	"The Best Possible Team! We're Going To Win With Ono no Komachi!"; Transliteration: "Saikyō chīmu!! Ono no Komachi-san de katsu n ja!" (Japanese: 最強チーム!! 小野小町さんで勝つんじゃ!)	Kunitoshi Okajima	Katsuyuki Sumisawa	January 25, 2005
Kawachi's match is up first and he easily wins by grounding and converting his yakisoba into a sausage, compressing its flavors together. Seeing that Kazuma is still depressed, Kawachi gives Kazuma the idea of "smashing" his way to victory. For his match against Shachihoko, Kazuma predictably loses in terms of the yakisoba's taste, but his overall yakisoba bread proves better after using his heated wok to smash the bun flat like an okonomiyaki, indirectly creating a panini that defeats Shachihoko.
16	"The Green Marvel! It's The Magician Kazuma!"; Transliteration: "Midori no kiseki!! Mahōtsukai Kazuma!" (Japanese: ミドリの奇跡!! 魔法使い和馬ッ!)	Tōru Yamada	Kento Shimoyama	February 1, 2005
Once the pair's battle is over, Mr. Koala is declared the winner of the cash prize for his yakisoba bread, but Ryuu attempts to steal the cash for himself. To their surprise, Mr. Koala easily keeps up with Ryuu's martial arts and drives him off, confirming Ken's suspicions that Koala is actually Mokoyama. The match between Azuma and Koala begins; the object is to create an animal bread that is attractive to both women and young children with special judge Dave Hashiguchi being invited to co-judge with Kuroyanagi. Matsushiro explains that Koala was skilled at knitting and could make an incredible dragon braided bread. Kazuma however, relies on a slow baked turtle bread with a green shell from a colored syrup coat.
17	"Decisive Battle! Koala's Dragon VS Kazuma's Turtle!"; Transliteration: "Daisakusen!! Koara no ryū VS Kazuma no kame!" (Japanese: 大決戦!! コアラの竜VS和馬のカメ!)	Megumi Yamamoto	Tetsuko Takahashi	February 8, 2005
Aesthetically, both breads are tied, and when tasted, Kuroyanagi and Dave again cannot decide a winner between the pair. To their surprise, Mokoyama steps up and concedes defeat as he could not be a newcomer and only entered the tournament to defeat Kazuma – considering another draw as good as a defeat. On Mokoyama's request, Tsukino calls off her bet with Mizuno, who angrily fires Mokoyama for forfeiting. While departing, Mokoyama thanks Mizuno for the time they spent together and warns them that further quarreling would only benefit Pantasia's top competitor, St. Pierre, whose owner planned to overtake the entire industry. Mizuno eventually takes back her anger and chases down Koala to re-hire him.
18	"With A Little Prayer! An Oath On The Grave!"; Transliteration: "Inori o komete!! Bozen no chikai!" (Japanese: 祈りをこめて!! 墓前の誓い!)	Keiko Oyamada	Akatsuki Yamatoya	February 15, 2005
Kawachi's animal bread match against Katsuo begins, but Katsuo invites his wife over and their delving into inappropriate topics results in the judges immediately awarding Kawachi the win without tasting. Kawachi becomes dejected when Kuroyanagi is pushed into eating his crab bread but has no reaction and is consoled by Kazuma and another competitor, Shigeru Kanmuri. Kawachi and Kazuma soon notice that Tsukino was uncharacteristically absent for Kawachi's match, and Ken directs them to the cemetery, where Tsukino's mother now rests. Ken reveals that Tsukino was born from her father's affair, and that her mother passed away only a few years prior. On the day of the funeral, Tsukino's older half-sister, Yukino, scattered the ashes of Tsukino's mother at a tree, forcing Tsukino to now only pays respects to the tree rather than a proper tombstone, and warns them that Yukino was absolutely ruthless in her methods and had Kanmuri under her thumb. Enraged, Kazuma and Kawachi pay respects with Tsukino and promise to defeat Kanmuri and win the tournament for her.
19	"Nightmarish Semifinals! Yukino's Despicable Trap!"; Transliteration: "Akumu no junkesshō!! Yukino no hiretsuna wana!" (Japanese: 悪夢の準決勝!! 雪乃の卑劣な罠!)	Tarō Iwasaki	Katsuyuki Sumisawa	February 22, 2005
The semi-finals match, Kanmuri vs. Kawachi is about to begin, but Ken is able to uncover Kanmuri's true identity as a prodigious food chemist from Harvard. For his match, Kawachi receives a special yeast from Matsushiro. Concurrently, Yukino requests an endoprotease from Kanmuri, which can break down proteins. Additionally, the semi-finals would also be attended by Tsukino's grandfather and Meister Kirisaki. Kanmuri briefly converses with Kuroyanagi, who was his old senior at Harvard, to reveal that he completed their three year research into finding the perfect yeast. As they knead their dough, Kanmuri immediately notices that Kawachi has the Solar Gauntlets, but despite that, his dough has yet to form up, and realizes that Yukino had likely dumped the endoprotease to sabotage Kawachi.
20	"Indomitable Fighting Spirit! Use Adversity As A Springboard To Success!"; Transliteration: "Fukutsu no tōshi!! Gyakkyō o bane ni tachiagare!" (Japanese: 不屈の闘志!! 逆境をバネに立ち上がれ!)	Shinichi Masaki	Katsuyuki Sumisawa	March 8, 2005
Kawachi desperately kneads his dough to no avail thanks to the endoprotease Yukino had placed into his yeast. While Kanmuri is already preparing to bake his dough, Kawachi believes the venue's air conditioning is preventing his dough from rising and asks for it to be shut off. Kanmuri can only show the true difference in their abilities and finishes his pan aux algaes, a french roll with marine yeast. Kawachi, however, cannot even get his dough to progress despite the entire room heating up excessively, and the audience getting increasingly irate by his inability to fix his dough. Eventually, a riot begins with the audience throwing objects at Kawachi as he eventually passes out from heat stroke, giving Kanmuri the win by default. When he wakes up in a bed, Kawachi refuses a rematch as he willingly concedes defeat and notices both the superiority of Kanmuri's ability and that he also has the Solar Hands like Kazuma.
21	"Experimental, Historical, Supreme Bread! It's Japan #44!"; Transliteration: "Shisaku shijō saikyō no pan!! Japan 44-gō ja!" (Japanese: 試作史上最強のパン!! ジャぱん44号じゃッ!)	Hirofumi Ogura	Akatsuki Yamatoya	March 15, 2005
After Kawachi's dreadful defeat at the hands of Kanmuri, Azuma decides to use his strongest Ja-pan, Japan #44, against Suwabara for their semi-finals match. Though Suwabara enhances his Solar Gauntlets by holding dry ice to heat them up even further for kneading his 648-layer croissant, but Kazuma relies on a special stone slab he had placed in his oven before baking. To everyone's shock, both Kuroyanagi and Dave pass away after tasting Kazuma's bread. While police are contacted, Azuma assures everyone that it will take some time for the pair to return from the afterlife. Meanwhile, Kuroyangi and Dave's spirits enter heaven as Azuma had predicted, and they surprisingly find themselves entering a bunny hostess club. The head hostess treating Kuroyanagi, however, confirms that their "death" from the bread's deliciousness was only temporary, and true enough, Kuroyanagi fades back into the living with Dave and immediately declare Kazuma the winner much to Kai's dumbfounded surprise. As soon as the tasting is done, Dave flees with Kazuma's remaining bread. Kazuma, however, offers to make a new one but warns that it is possible to still get sick of Japan #44's taste over time. Additionally, he reveals his special slab to be petalite, which emits more far-infrared rays than a stone oven, ensuring a more delicious baked bread than modern convection ovens.
22	"Just Before The Finals! The Black Shadow That Approaches Kazuma!"; Transliteration: "Kesshōsen chokuzen!! Kazuma ni semaru kuroi kage" (Japanese: 決勝戦直前!! 和馬に迫る黒い影)	Keiko Oyamada	Akatsuki Yamatoya	March 22, 2005
With the finals match now decided between Kanmuri and Kazuma, Kuroyanagi leaves to coordinate the match while Kirisaki approaches the South Tokyo members to reveal that they had indeed found Kawachi's dough to have been sabotaged but are unable to find direct proof of Yukino's involvement. Kawachi is then assigned to fight Suwabara for a 3rd place match. Matsushiro also suggests that Kawachi go train at a church during the finals, before facing Suwabara. Yukino and Kanmuri are the last to depart with Kanmuri requesting Yukino not interfere in the finals as Kirisaki was growing increasingly suspicious of foul play. Yukino agrees but finds that Kazuma has forgotten his petalite board and destroys it.
23	"Sticky Showdown! Azuma Kazuma VS Kanmuri Shigeru!"; Transliteration: "Mochimochi taiketsu!! Azuma Kazuma VS Kanmuri Shigeru!" (Japanese: モチモチ対決!! 東和馬VS冠茂!)	Yoshito Hata	Toshifumi Kawase	March 29, 2005
Kawachi visits the church recommended by Matsushiro and finds it to be afro-shaped and meets the headnun, who drags him inside by force to pay worship. After learning Kawachi's sins against Azuma, the nun agrees to belligerently train him for the 3rd place match. At the same time, Kanmuri is refining his yeast to no longer need any additional salt for maximum flavor. For the finals match, Kanmuri inquires if Azuma had brought his petalite board for their match only to learn that it was stolen after the semi-finals. Kanmuri makes a backhanded comment that Yukino was likely the culprit, and is later found by Yukino, who has a demolition team ready to destroy his lab should he fail to win. The match gains considerably more publicity because of Kuroyanagi and Dave's "deaths" and results in the audience rioting when Azuma is clearly not making Japan #44. While Kanmuri uses high mineral sea water for his dough, Kazuma is kneading his dough in running water to the point that he is almost washing his bowl instead.
24	"Meister Flying In The Air! Who Will Be The Winner?!"; Transliteration: "Soratobu maisutā!! Katsu no wa dotchi!?" (Japanese: 空飛ぶマイスター!! 勝つのはどっち!?)	Teruo Satō	Toshifumi Kawase	March 29, 2005
Kawachi returns after shockingly changing his hairstyle into an afro. Meanwhile Azuma and Kanmuri battle it out with Kanmuri's dough showing amazing elasticity thanks to the high amount of water and the power of the yeast in his dough made with wheat imported from Soissons. To everyone's surprise, Azuma prepares a second dough and it reveals itself to be much more elastic before the pair begin baking. The judging is taken over by Meister Kirisaki, who gives Kanmuri's pain rustique full points, with his pet peacock Coo showing himself as his reaction. Azuma's bread, however, causes Coo to break off of Kirisaki's mask with Kirisaki declaring Azuma the winner. Kanmuri protests due to the superior quality of his ingredients, but Kuroyanagi takes over and explains that Kazuma intentionally destroyed his first dough to obtain its vital wheat gluten, which was added into the second dough to dramatically enhance its flavor and texture, which had exceeded Kanmuri's bread.
25	"What Was That?! Kawachi, A Man's Hard Training!"; Transliteration: "Nan'yate!! Kawachi, otoko no mōtokkun!" (Japanese: なんやてっ!! 河内、漢の猛特訓!)	Tōru Yamada	Tetsuko Takahashi	April 5, 2005
Because of Kanmuri's defeat, Yukino as promised, destroys his research. With his match coming up, Kawachi recounts his defeat against the headnun, who intentionally made rivets that caused her bread to explode like an afro when baked, but defeated his baguette despite its odd shape. When he exclaims "what the!?", the nun criticizes him for only acting within conventional knowledge and not challenging himself to try something beyond common sense. When learning of the debacle, Ken laughs it off and reveals Kawachi was scammed by an imposter. Despite this, the match with Kai is underway with Kawachi sticking multiple chopsticks into this baguette dough before baking it. Kai, however, was making an extra long "dancing" baguette for their showdown.
26	"Last Match Of The Newcomer's Battle! Singing And Dancing French Breads!"; Transliteration: "Shinjin-sen saishū shiai!! Utatte odoru Furansupan!" (Japanese: 新人戦最終試合!! 歌って踊るフランスパン!)	Keiko Oyamada	Kento Shimoyama	April 19, 2005
The final match between Kawachi and Suwabara is in its final stages. Kawachi introduces his "singing" French bread begins whistling from the oven, but Kai's bread begins swinging like a snake after baking. Kuroyanagi takes over the 3rd place judging from Kirisaki and finds that Kai's bread to still be incredibly fluffy thanks to extreme length he had pulled his baguette to. Kawachi's "double crust" singing bread finally finishes, and Kuroyanagi declares the match a draw. Kawachi's bread is soon revealed to have an interior crust from the air hole created by the chopsticks, while a thin gap splitting the dough in half during its second baking atop a steamer formed a flavor-packed interior crust within the bread. When Kawachi attempts to argue against the draw, however, Kuroyanagi has Kawwachi carry Kai's bread, revealing that it was far lighter despite the length, and that Kai used roughly the same amount of flour but added large air pockets inside the dough to guarantee the best fluffiness to go with the length and taste.

=== Monaco Cup Arc ===
No.	Title	Directed by	Written by	Original air date
27	"Let's All Make Bread Together! It's Japan #2!"; Transliteration: "Rettsu min'na de pand-zukuri!! Japan 2-gō ja!" (Japanese: レッツみんなでパン作り!! ジャぱん2号じゃッ!)	Shigeru Kimiya	Katsuyuki Sumisawa	April 26, 2005
The awards ceremony finishes with Kazuma, Kanmuri, and Kai being awarded a study trip to France in addition to their cash prizes. Kawachi is not able to claim the 3rd place's trip to France but is instead gifted the right to transfer to the main Pantasia branch as Suwabara is already an employee and ineligible. Kanmuri surprisingly hands his trip to Kawachi, however, as he had already studied in France before and had no need for the trip. Kawachi takes the offer to transfer to the main branch, but Kanmuri opts to transfer to the South Tokyo Branch instead, which Ken immediately approves. Kanmuri and Kawachi are given a week to transfer. The next day approaches with a child requesting for Kazuma's Japan #57, which is currently sold out. To compensate, Kazuma prepares a bread made with a rice cooker. To ensure an even cook with the rice cooker's lower max temperature, Kazuma repeatedly flipped the half-baked bread until it was fully cooked and made use of the rice cooker's direct heat. As this is all going on, Yukino now works with Mr. Kirisaki, Meister Kirisaki's father and the owner of St. Pierre,.
28	"The Ten Billion Yen Man?! Pantasia's Life Or Death Crisis!"; Transliteration: "Hyaku oku no otoko!? Pantajia sonbō no kiki!" (Japanese: 百億の男!? パンタジア存亡の危機!)	Shinichi Masaki	Akatsuki Yamatoya	May 3, 2005
Kanmuri is now an employee of the Southern Tokyo branch in place of Kawachi, who has moved to the main store. Kanmuri reveals that Yukino is secretly selling stocks of Pantasia to St. Pierre. With Mizuno too young to oppose Yukino and their grandfather too doting to argue against his granddaughter, only Tsukino can properly resist the plan. With Kawachi now gone, Kanmuri now begins planning to expand South Tokyo's lineup with some low calorie flour to create breads more marketable to the nearby all-girls schools. The flour, however, proves cumbersome as the lack of gluten prevents the dough from forming. Surprisingly, Azuma finds a solution by soaking the dough in water and leaving it covered in the fridge for days, causing self-digestion and allows the enzymes to break down the dough on their own. While sales are up, Kanmuri and Ken see that this will never be enough to stop the takeover, and are joined by Kawachi, who had become home-sick without the South Tokyo staff. Kanmuri reveals his intention of sending Pantasia's bakers as Japan's representatives for Monaco Cup, an international baking competition where Japan is the heavy underdog, and gambling private funds and South Tokyo's reserves to buy out the remaining stocks and stop Yukino's plan.
29	"Close Attack! The Birth Of The Black Japan!"; Transliteration: "Hakugeki!! Burakku japan tanjō!" (Japanese: 迫撃!! ブラックジャぱん誕生!)	Tōru Yamada	Katsuyuki Sumisawa	May 10, 2005
Yukino hires three men from the St. Pierre Kyushu branch (Parodying the Black Tri-Stars from Mobile Suit Gundam) for their ability to copy bread. Yukino tricks the men into making the special diet bread that is being sold by Pantasia and claiming it to be the original. To make a nutritious and tasty bread, Azuma considers using Rice Bran as a key ingredient. The South Tokyo staff visit St. Pierre after closing to present them with Kazuma's new black croissant with special grounded bamboo charcoal. The taste of the croissant helps expose Yukino's lies to the bakers, and they all deface the store before resigning.
30	"And Now, It's France! Aim For The Monaco Cup!"; Transliteration: "Iza Furansu!! Mezase Monako kappu!" (Japanese: いざフランス!! 目指せモナコカップ!)	Hirofumi Ogura	Kento Shimoyama	May 17, 2005
Azuma, Kawachi, Suwabara, and Kuroyanagi now depart for France. Just before going through the gate, Kanmuri hands Kawachi a box which he can open in case he's in trouble. The group are joined by Meister Kirisaki's peacock, Coo, who directs them straight to the bakery of Meister Kirisaki's younger sister Sophie Balzac Kirisaki. The trio are to train under her for a month to learn the type of bread preferred by the French as an edge. To their surprise, Sophie's bakery is empty with most of the customers being hogged by the nearby Maison Kayser. The Kayser brothers, and France's representatives for the Monaco Cup, Gran, Bob, and Edward, arrive to meet the team and provide them with their high quality brioche buns as an introductory gift before flashing the dexterity of their fingers. While Kawachi is easily intimidated by the nimbleness, much to the brothers' surprise, Kazuma and Kai are both equally gifted and are not impressed.
31	"The Critical Touch-And-Go Situation! The Prohibited Rodin Strategy!"; Transliteration: "Isshokusokuhatsu!! Kindan no Rodan sakusen!" (Japanese: 一触即発!! 禁断のロダン作戦!)	Teruo Satō	Toshifumi Kawase	May 24, 2005
As the training for the Monaco Cup continues on, Kawachi receives a sudden phone call from Kanmuri's box, revealing both a cellphone smuggled in by Kanmuri as well as a special capsule only to be opened during emergencies. For the opening exhibition match, all teams are instructed to make decorative breads. Kawachi, through Kanmuri, suggests that Rodin's famous Thinker be made as their bread that will be presented in the opening of the Monaco cup. After its completion, Kawachi as planned accidentally ruins it. With no other choice, team Japan makes a new life sized statue, with Kawachi inside. Kawachi is eventually found out, and team Japan starts at a disadvantage with 8 points, as well as being considered the weakest team in the Monaco cup, as planned by Kanmuri.
32	"This Is The World Level! The Roulette That Brings Forth A Storm!"; Transliteration: "Korezo sekai reberu!! Arashi o yobu rūretto!" (Japanese: これぞ世界レベル!! 嵐を呼ぶルーレット!)	Yoshito Hata	Toshifumi Kawase	May 31, 2005
The first part of the preliminary round begins. In the first round, a roulette wheel is used to select ingredients for the bread. The bread must be made with only the ingredients that were selected by the roulette wheel. Team Japan is put in a hopeless position after all three members ended up getting only eggs, without any sort of spice or seasoning like salt or sugar. Additionally, the event's judge, Pierrot Bolneze, warns the team that while he can send duplicates to judge all the breads simultaneously, he still only has one stomach, meaning he will not taste dishes unless absolutely required and immediately gives 0 points to teams unable to obtain seasonings from the roulette. To counter the situation, Kazuma relies on Japan #21.
33	"Snacks At 3 P.M.! It's Japan #21!"; Transliteration: "3-ji no oyatsu!! Japan 21-gō ja!" (Japanese: 3時のおやつ!! ジャぱん21号じゃッ!)	Chiaki Ōta	Akatsuki Yamatoya	June 7, 2005
Unlike other teams that were instantly given 0 points for not obtaining salt or sugar, Pierrot identifies that Japan had used germinated crude wheat flour, which is naturally sweetened already, and does not immediately fail them. After trying Azuma's bread, Pierrot recalls his early life after being abandoned at a circus and training as a performer since childhood and was convinced by his adoptive father and ringmaster to become a clown. When the circus moved to Japan, however, it did so without sufficient marketing or training for the Japanese audience and was near bankruptcy until Pierrot was able to change the situation. By the time he finishes part of the story, he realizes everyone is asleep and gives Japan full points. Despite Japan beating the odds, youngest brother Edward is not convinced and personally challenges Team Japan during the second preliminary round. Kai decides to fight Edward fairly and is allowed by Kazuma to fight the second round on his own. This time, slot machines are prepared for the contestants with Kai's superior martial training allowing him to win hundreds of coins. This turns out to be a hazard, however, as Pierrot now requires them to use all ingredients written in the coins they won.
34	"Lupan #3! Pain D'epice, Kai-Style"; Transliteration: "Rupan 3-gō!! Pan de episu Kai (kai)!" (Japanese: ルパン3号!! パン・デ・エピス戒(改)!)	Yasuyuki Shinozaki	Akatsuki Yamatoya	June 14, 2005
The planning for the second round of preliminaries is underway for Japan as Kai sorts the hundreds of coins he earned to list the ingredients required for his bread. Kai lists 34 different ingredients for his bread, but Kazuma has full faith that Kai can find a solution. Kai uses the round as a platform to finally show off his Lupan series of breads, inspired with "stealing" techniques of others for superiority. With the multitude of ingredients in his arsenal, Kai fights back with his spiced loaf by finely crushing all the ingredients by hand while Edward's bread is passed with full marks as it was already consumed from last year. After tasting the loaf, Pierrot now remembers how he first developed his cloning technique which saved the circus. Despite receiving heavy praise from his peers, the audience only recognizes the other acts such as the trapeze artists. He would have a single fan that recognized him without the makeup, and they began a relationship. Unfortunately, they would be forced to break up when the circus had to go on tour in America. After finally moving on from the break-up Pierrot admits to wanting to award Japan an excess of two points, but can only give them the maximum as per regulation.
35	"The World Pays Attention! The Monaco Cup Finals Begin!"; Transliteration: "Sekai ga chūmoku!! Monako kappu honsen sutāto!" (Japanese: 世界が注目!! モナコカップ本選スタート!)	Shinichi Masaki	Tetsuko Takahashi	June 28, 2005
For his failure to subdue the Japanese team, Edward is harshly punished by Gran and Bob upon his return. To their surprise, the other team to pass with full marks like France is America, which includes Shachihoko, who transferred to St. Pierre America after being introduced by Yukino. After learning that Team Japan had made it through preliminaries, Mr. Kirisaki orders for St. Pierre's main branch to pull a flash sale, greatly eating away at South Tokyo's customers. In response, Kinoshita and his cloning work is used as an attraction to bring in customers. At the Monaco Cup, the remaining 16 teams are given a speed test to make it within 60 minutes and requiring the dough to be fully risen when baked.
36	"A Speed Contest! Ping It With That!"; Transliteration: "Supīdo shōbu!! Are de chin shite!" (Japanese: スピード勝負!! アレでチンしてッ!)	Hirofumi Ogura	Toshifumi Kawase	July 12, 2005
To solve the speedtest, Azuma brings in a microwave to bake the bread. The Americans are the first team to qualify using a extra powerful stand mixer to prepare the dough within a short time. France is soon to follow with the other seven of the eight slots filled out. With only one team left, Kai is barely able to present his bread on time. Pierrot, however, warns the team that he will be extra harsh in his grading due to his hatred for microwaves. After consuming Azuma's Japan, however, Pierrot remembers his trip to America, where his ringmaster recounted a dubious story of an old woman accidentally using a microwave to dry her cat after a bath and accidentally killing it, leading to a successful lawsuit as the microwave instructions did not include anything on not drying pets. This is used to warn Pierrot to care for the circus at Las Vegas. Before Pierrot can hand out a verdict, Shachihoko quietly intrudes and mentions the entire incident to only be an urban myth. This results in a shocked Pierrot passing the Japan as the final team. At the same time Mr. Kirisaki is on his way to France.
37	"Survival! Bakers On An Uninhabited Island!"; Transliteration: "Sabaibaru!! Mujintō no pan shokunin!" (Japanese: サバイバル!! 無人島のパン職人!)	Tōru Yamada	Kento Shimoyama	July 19, 2005
The quarterfinals begin with the eight teams being dropped off in an uninhabited island with flour and the requirement to make a good, sweet bread with the island's resources. While the other teams are assigned inland, Kirisaki uses his influence with the event organizer to send Japan to a shoal that is flooded during high tide. Kawachi and Kai are split from Azuma, who is rescued by the Egyptian Team. Mr. Kirisaki, however, is not satisfied and has the event chairman order the Kayser Brothers to set fire to the trees after collecting fruits to ensure Japan will lose out.
38	"And Now You Must Swim! Little Taiyaki Of The Southern Island!"; Transliteration: "Iza oyoge!! Minami no shima no Taiyaki-kun!" (Japanese: いざ泳げ!! 南の島のタイ焼きくん!)	Teruo Satō	Kento Shimoyama	July 26, 2005
Surrounded by a sea of flames, Kawachi and Suwabara are saved by one of the Egyptian representatives. The Egyptians are really the Monaco secret police; they are currently tailing team France, who are believed to be cheating. During that time team Japan is reunited, however now that the forest had been burnt down by team France, there is no way to gather fruit to use in making the sweet bread. Azuma comes up with the idea of using potatoes, and the sap of a surviving palm tree. At the end of the week, team Japan presents Pierrot with their sweet, Taiyaki Japan #9. Pierrot remembers how the circus had now attained international fame and was being invited to France. Determined to succeed and find his parents, Pierrot overtrains and is hospitalized with severe sprains across his entire body. Fortunately, a special masseur named Kid arrives and heals Pierrot in time for his Paris tour. Unfortunately, Team Japan collapses from heat stroke by the time Pierrot finishes his story.
39	"A Dive Into Hell! A New Scheme!"; Transliteration: "Jigoku e no daibu!! Aratanaru bōryaku!" (Japanese: 地獄へのダイブ!! 新たなる謀略!)	Shinichi Masaki	Akatsuki Yamatoya	July 26, 2005
Because of the incident on the island, a re-match is being held in Mexico. The objective is to make a bread with fish or a bread that tastes good with fish. Each team must skydive down towards the San Agustin River, the place where the match is being held, but in order to eliminate team Japan, the professional skydivers that were hired for the match, lead team Japan away from the river and towards Huautla, the deepest cave in the world, before suddenly detaching themselves without warning. Pierrot, noticing something is wrong, follows team Japan into Huautla and rescues Kai, who had passed out because of his fear of heights and did not release his parachute on time. Eventually team Japan begins to lose hope about ever coming out alive and finds a small pond containing small fish with an underwater exit after 2-3km. Pierrot convinces team Japan that he will go and call for help, but in truth he cannot swim.
40	"Pierrot's Miscalculation! The Last Supper, How Does It Taste?"; Transliteration: "Piero no daigosan!! Saigo no bansan, oaji wa ikaga?" (Japanese: ピエロの大誤算!! 最後の晩餐、お味はいかが?)	Yoshito Hata	Katsuyuki Sumisawa	August 2, 2005
Trying to delay the Japanese team as much a possible, Pierrot develops a long term reaction over the course of the episode. Pierrot's reaction includes a complex code that only Azuma solves, revealing he is very strong when it comes to numbers. After much procrastination, Pierrot finally dives in, discovering that because of his reaction to Azuma's bread he had obtained gills and was able to swim the 2-3 km and accidentally makes it to Sophie and Kuroyanagi.
41	"The King's Question! Who Must Taste Delicious Bread First?"; Transliteration: "Ōsama no shitsumon!! Oishisōna pan o saisho ni tabesaseru no wa?" (Japanese: 王様の質問!! 美味しそうなパンを最初に食べさせるのは?)	Tōru Yamada	Katsuyuki Sumisawa	August 9, 2005
After being rescued from the cave by the Egyptian team, Azuma and the gang finally meet the king of Monaco, who is also the new chairman of the competition after the former one ran away after being suspected of fixing the competition. The next theme for the semi-finals is to make a sports bread. As well Japan's opponent is France. Later while Azuma and the others are gathering ingredients at the royal palace, Sophie tells of a tragic story regarding her brother, herself, and their father. During the flashback, Mr. Kirisaki asks the question "Who do you give delicious looking bread to?" in front of the starving Sophie and Meister. Initially, they answer "his children", but Kirisaki responds that the true was the "baker themselves" before gorging the entire loaf in front of them. At the palace, the king asks the exact same question, and Azuma answers the exact same way Kirisaki did, asserting that while the bread may look delicious, the taste itself is still in question. Near the end of the episode, it is learned that the king and Kirisaki knew each other when the king was a child. It also becomes clear as to why the Japanese team must be eliminated.
42	"Curiouser and Curiouser!! The Truth About the Kaysers!"; Transliteration: "Kikikaikai!! Kaizā no shōtai!" (Japanese: 奇々怪々!! カイザーの正体!)	Kiyoshi Fukumoto	Toshifumi Kawase	August 16, 2005
Team Japan begins to prepare for their match against Kayser. On the scheduled day of the match, Kayser reveals their true form, which involves the eldest brother Gran holding the trio up with his hands, which were impossibly dexterous compared to Kai and would now be fully used. Mysteriously, Azuma, who was lacking ideas until the last day, does not arrive, leaving Suwabara and Kawachi to face the Kayser brothers. Additionally, the French audience provide a hostile environment against the visiting Japanese team. Suwabara attempts to use his Crimson Lupan #6 which has softshell turtle bread to increase the nutrition. In response, Kayser points out a fatal flaw in Kai's bread while unveiling a blueberry dough with yogurt and pearl powder.
43	"Fully Nutritional! Sports Pan Confrontation!"; Transliteration: "Eiyō tappuri!! Supōtsu pan taiketsu!" (Japanese: 栄養たっぷり!! スポーツパン対決!)	Hiroki Negishi	Kento Shimoyama	August 23, 2005
Despite Kayser pointing out that Kai's bread will not succeed, Kai refuses to yield and continues baking his Lupan #6. Fortunately, Azuma arrives, having prepared his bread in a private limousine with the King. Thanks to the King's endorsement, Kazuma's bread is considered official. Pierrot first tastes Gran's pearl bread, and his reaction has him shave Kawachi shiny bald like a pearl while using the code, "tora tora tora", the signal used for the attack on Pearl Harbor. Kayser's bread is soon found to also include Hydrangeas for a calming effect after the initial bite. Suwabara attempts to present his Lupan #6, but Pierrot flatly rejects it after tracing red wine in the dough, whose alcohol could potentially impair a driver. As a result, Kazuma's tire-shaped bread is tasted instead which is wrapped in nori. To everyone's shock, Kazuma is declared the winner and a riot nearly starts. Fortunately, Kayser accepts the decision after noticing the black interior dough, correctly deducing that eels and blackbeans were also added for their beneficial effects to the eyes. Pierrot, however, points out that Kazuma also added silk powder which antitoxidants to further add sweetness and meltiness to the dough's taste, completely evading Gran's eyes. Kayser accepts his defeat honorably with Azuma asking for another showdown in the future.
44	"The Threat Of The Speed Of Sound! Gopan #97!"; Transliteration: "Onsoku no kyōi!! Gopan 97-gō!" (Japanese: 音速の脅威!! ゴぱん97号!)	Shinichi Masaki	Tetsuko Takahashi	September 6, 2005
The group is outside a restaurant celebrating their victory, with Kawachi having a new wig for his hair after being shaved off. Kawachi is overconfident in their ability as usual in their final victory. The winner between China and America during the earlier battle turns out to be America, with all three of their breads winning, and to top that Sachihoko's bread placed third in the semi-finals. The group learns of a new opponent, Shadow, the best in the American team, with Gopan #97, surpassing Azuma's Japan #51. It is made from rice flour instead of wheat flour. Kawachi experiences another mental breakdown in lack of confidence, and is told that to win, he must create a bread as good as Azuma's It turns out that Mikhail Schukapper (an F1 racer) had tasted both finalist breads, and in his speech about his victories and life, he states that he preferred the Gopan to Azuma's Japan. Kuroyanagi fears that Azuma will react badly upon hearing this as never in his life has he lost in a bread contest. Azuma ends up leaving, only to be discovered later to have visited Shadow, who turns out to be just as disturbing as he seemed. Azuma gets the determination to work harder after seeing him. It is revealed that the final will consist of three one-on-one matches, with three themes, the clothing, food and shelter of bread. Clothing is aesthetic appeal, the bread that is most representative of the clothes you wear. Food is to make dinner bread that is versatile and will complement anything and everything. Lastly, shelter is the bread with the best taste of your homeland. Suwabara takes the first match, Kawachi the second, and Azuma the third. We also learn that Kawachi knows much about F1 racers.
45	"Nude, Nude, Nude! Magnificent Bread Battle!"; Transliteration: "Ra, ra, ra!! Karei naru pan shōbu!" (Japanese: 裸・裸・裸!! 華麗なるパン勝負!)	Hirofumi Ogura	Akatsuki Yamatoya	September 13, 2005
The episode starts with Kawachi commenting on Suwabara being foolish in using his sword to carve a wooden log in the middle of the road. He doesn't understand why Suwabara is doing such a thing. Sophie announces that Monica Adenauer takes up the challenge of the first match; Sachihoko has the second, and Shadow the third. Kuroyanagi's old friend Kid informs the group of who Monica is in the story, suddenly out of the blue, with his power as the head of a NY investigation company named "KID". We learn that both Shadow and Monica were novices chosen for their promise, and the reason Sachihoko was there was to teach the two other teammates during the competition. Monica turns out to be a real challenge, as she is the Queen of Patisserie (revealed in manga to have won by default though). Monica adores junk food and candies, and we find out she is on the American team because Kirisaki promises to fulfill her dream to own a 'Candy Castle' if she wins. Suwabara isn't flustered though, and steps up to the challenge, revealing the wooden block carving to be something he's planned all along, for his Lupan #1:Pane d'oro Kai. Monica dresses up in beach attire at the competition, hoping to try to dissuade Suwabara but he only rips off all of his clothing except for a small loincloth, and both start baking in (relatively) no clothing. Monica uses five dough bowls for her rye bread, inspired by her mom, who was German. Suwabara uses two dough bowls though. He applies honeyed fruit to his crown bread, but Monica counters by making a candy rose. The match continues in next episode.
46	"Pierrot Arrested?! Bread Filled With Love!"; Transliteration: "Piero gosō!? Ai ga gisshiri tsumatta pan!" (Japanese: ピエロ護送!? 愛がぎっしり詰まったパン!)	Teruo Satō; Shinya Watada	Akatsuki Yamatoya	September 20, 2005
Monica and Suwabara are having their battle. Monica had already finished her bread not long after Suwabara finishes his, and when he does just as Pierrot was about to judge Monica's bread first, Monica told Pierrot to judge Suwabara's bread. After taking a bite, Pierrot's reaction bases itself on Pandora's box as a pun on Pan d' Oro, creating a giant box and releasing multiple napa cabbages to harass the audience. Suwabara further reveals that he did not only just use fruits pickled in honey, but made sure said honey had the appropriate color of fruit also crushed and mixed to enhance the color. Pierrot then was about to judge Monica's bread, only to find Monica's sugar rose had bloomed into a beautiful flower. During Pierrot's reaction to Monica's bread, Pierrot calls the Monegasque police and turns himself in for harassment as a reference from the multiple layers of her bread being to levels of confinement. At the detention center, Monica is declared the winner as the different layers and taste combinations of her bread ensures that one cannot get sick of it. Accepting his loss, Kai offers a handshake to Monica, who immediately flinches and does not immediately take it. Annoyed, Kai personally grabs her hands and finds that it is heavily scarred due to working with molten sugar regularly. To Monica's surprise, Kai compliments her hands and considers it the product of being a true artisan.
47	"Victory! Revolutionizing The Bread Industry!"; Transliteration: "Vikutorī!! Pan gyōkai ni kakumei o!" (Japanese: ヴィクトリー!! パン業界に革命を!)	Chiaki Ōta	Kento Shimoyama	September 27, 2005
With Suwabara having lost his match (and his heart) to U.S. competitor Monica, Kawachi is urged by Kuroyanagi to start working on his bread, but Kawachi procrastinates as he cannot think of anything to use. To his surprise, the South Tokyo staff arrive and reveal his family was invited to the Monaco Cup Finals and reveal the unopened capsule contained a scroll of Kawachi's late father, who never gave up trying to join Pantasia even when he knew his skills did not compare with the top bakers. Greatly inspired, Kawachi manually begins building his own bread moulds to start a revolutionary bread inspired by his father. While Kawachi succeeds in making a flavorful crust, he finds the crumb to be bitter and unpalatable from the buckwheat flour he is adding to his everyday bread. The match between Shachihoko and Kawachi begins with Shachihoko, but Monica clarifies that Shachihoko was only last in placing in the semi-finals as he was more focused on teaching his teammates than actually competing. True to her warnings, Shachihoko prepares a roasted Simit on a bamboo pole with powderized miso, while Kawachi prepares to counter with his specialized mould.
48	"Great Detective Pierrot! A Reaction You Can Lay Your Life On!"; Transliteration: "Meitantei Piero!! Inochi o kaketa riakushon!" (Japanese: 名探偵ピエロ!! 命をかけたリアクション!)	Tōru Yamada	Kento Shimoyama	October 4, 2005
The episode begins with the 2nd final of the Monaco Cup. While Sachihoko finishes his Egyptian bread, Alexandria, far ahead of Kawachi, Kawachi, unable to resist the urge to watch Pierrot's reaction, looks up to realise that time has stopped. He then meets fictional character Conan the Detective, who astounds Kawachi with his perfect deceptions of the frozen beings around him. Kawachi, fed up with Pierrot's mind games, starts calling Conan names. Conan pretends not to hear in order that Kawachi loudly repeats the phrase 'Conan, you measel!' repeatedly, until Kawachi sees through the ruse and yells, 'Kodaimai miso!', which was used in Spencer's bread. Conan then turns into Pierrot, and stumbles around drunkenly, revealing a dagger embedded in his back. Kawachi is accused of murder, but charges are cleared when Pierrot stands up, appearing fine. He then takes a bite of Kawachi's bread and launches into a story about his circus friends. The story continues for 4 hours, before Kawachi cracks and says that Pierrot is simply rambling on and that telling a pointless story wasn't going to help judge his bread. Pierrot appears relieved and says that he was wondering if Kawachi was ever going to stop him. He then collapses, and his wound starts bleeding. Pierrot says that it was not a pointless story, but a story of 'Victor, Me, and Ed.', which was a pun on 'Victory Bread'. Pierrot announces that Kawachi won the match, before being escorted out by the ambulance service, leaving Kuroyanagi to explain that Kawachi needed a top wider mould and added croissant dough mixed with berkshire lard, and tea, the latter being discreetly guided to him by Ken. Pierrot eventually collapses from the blood loss and is immediately hospitalized.
49	"Reunion at the VIP Seat! Heaven Again!"; Transliteration: "VIP seki de saikai!! Hebun agein!" (Japanese: VIP席で再開!! ヘブン・アゲイン!)	Tarō Iwasaki	Akatsuki Yamatoya	October 4, 2005
Pierrot is revealed to have "Bombay blood" and is on the verge of dying, a rare blood type shared with the King of Monaco, who immediately leaves to assist in a blood transfusion.. After the King of Monaco leaves, Ryou Kuroyanagi deduces that in order for someone like Pierrot to have "Bombay blood", the parents must have the same blood too. In the hospital, the King pulls out all the stops to save Pierrot's life (even smashing the transfusion pump switch so that it cannot be stopped) and they meet in heaven in the same cabaret from Episode 21. Pierrot constantly badmouths his parents for abandoning him and never coming to see him and states that he never wants to see them again, but the King is grief-stricken and finally confesses to Pierrot that he is his son, Prince Leol. Pierrot laughs it off until the King hugs him tightly and weeps for him as he is taken away by the angels. Pierrot reawakens as the King dies and breaks down, longing to be with his father again. Azuma promises him that he can send him to heaven with a new Japan, since he can no longer make his Japan #44 due to not having his petalite slab.
50	"I'll Show You The Universe! The Man Who Will Inherit Gopan!"; Transliteration: "Uchū o miseru!! Gopan o tsugu otoko!" (Japanese: 宇宙を魅せる!! ゴぱんを継ぐ男!)	Hiroki Negishi	Toshifumi Kawase	October 11, 2005
It's almost time for the final match of the Monaco Cup. The theme is "shelter", a bread with the taste of the competitor's homeland. Kuroyanagi briefs Azuma, Kawachi and Suwabara on Shadow White, Azuma's opponent in the final round. It is revealed that Shadow had an innate ability to copy the winposes of many famous sports stars as a kid, but turned to watching and imitating the famous mime Marcel Marceau after being bullied because of his talent. He became so good at mimicking that he started mimicking people unconsciously and ended up becoming a star circus performer. After being fired for appearing "soulless", he was found in a bar by Yuuichi Kirisaki and enrolled in the Monaco Cup, and is being worked to death by Kirisaki to copy his Gopan technique perfectly. Pierrot (now called the Miracle Prince because of his miraculous recovery) picks up the team in a helicopter and flies them to the tournament. Kuroyanagi is worried because Shadow's bread can create impossible reactions on ordinary people, not just hypersensitive types like him and Pierrot, so he wonders how Azuma will fare. Azuma is unafraid and boldly yells "Bring it on!"
51	"All The Ultimate Ingredients Collected! The Greatest Finals In All Of History!"; Transliteration: "Atsumerareta kyūkyoku no shokuzai!! Shijō saidai no kesshōsen!" (Japanese: 集められた究極の食材!! 史上最大の決勝戦!)	Yoshito Hata	Katsuyuki Sumisawa	October 25, 2005
It's the final match of the Monaco Cup. The arena is crowded. Shadow makes a Gopan bagel with rice flour made from a very hard and sticky rice that is perfect for making rice cakes and boils it in fine English tea instead of water, while Azuma makes Japan #61, a doughnut with powdered hemp seeds and cannabis milk in the dough (the episode is peppered with references to a Tokyo restaurant that exclusively serves hemp-based dishes) and tops it with a mixture of handmade brown sugar and powdered hemp seeds. Shadow finishes first and when Pierrot tastes his bagel, he is transported into Night on the Galactic Railroad (his mother's favorite fairytale) where he speaks to the ghost of his mother up in space. Pierrot is ecstatic and it looks like Shadow has won, but while Kawachi panics, Tsukino, Kanmuri and Matsushiro remain perfectly calm. The match continues into the next episode.
52	"Time Travelling Pierrot! To the Ends of the Universe Japan?!"; Transliteration: "Toki o koeru Piero!! Japan sekai no chōten e!?" (Japanese: 時を越えるピエロ!! ジャぱん世界の頂点へ!?)	Teruo Satō; Shinya Watada	Katsuyuki Sumisawa	November 1, 2005
Azuma has finished his Japan #61 and serves it to Pierrot. After eating it, Pierrot is transported back 23 years in time, before he was born, and appears in the Monaco court. The King and Queen do not recognize him as their son, but he claims to be a clown the King hired for the Queen's amusement and eventually becomes her favorite and most trusted servant. Pierrot is able to advise the over-eating Queen during her pregnancy on how to keep herself fit so she does not die during pregnancy and even rushes her to the hospital himself when her water breaks, but suddenly he begins to disappear inches from the hospital. Back in the present, Pierrot ends up crying bitterly as the reaction wears off until he is suddenly admonished by the King and Queen. Pierrot realizes he has altered the course of history and brought his parents back from the dead and excitedly pronounces Azuma the winner, meaning Japan has won the Monaco Cup. Shadow is in a rage, but Yuuichi Kirisaki suddenly appears and explains that he lost to Azuma because Azuma made all the ingredients himself by hand to give the bread a "home-made" taste which Shadow could not do. As a prize, Azuma is given a ring by the Queen of Monaco that she had given to 'Pierrot' in the past, however he decides to give it to Tsukino as thanks for her giving him her hairband in episode 2, and because the ring will get in the way when he is kneading dough – although Tsukino interprets it as an admission of love on Azuma's part...

=== Yakitate!! 9 Arc ===
No.	Title	Directed by	Written by	Original air date
53	"Kirisaki's Challenge! Start of the New Program "Yakitate! 9"!"; Transliteration: "Kirisaki kara no chōsenjō!! Shinbangumi "Yaki-tate!! 9" sutāto!" (Japanese: 霧崎からの挑戦状!! 新番組『焼きたて!!9』スタート!)	Keiko Oyamada	Katsuyuki Sumisawa	November 8, 2005
After buying out Pantasia and merging it with St. Pierre, Mr. Kirisaki challenges Azuma and the others to another bread competition, the Yakitate! 9, which is to be televised nationwide, offering Kuroyanagi the position of judge and presenter. Kirisaki also makes Tsukino the president of Pantasia while Yukino becomes the president of St. Pierre. On the plane home, Ken Matsushiro tells everyone about when Kuroyanagi started training under him in Pantasia. Kuroyanagi and Ken had been at loggerheads for years after Ken drove Kuroyanagi away during his apprenticeship, but Matsushiro explains that he realized Kuroyanagi was meant to be a food critic after the young Kuroyanagi deduced the proportions of ingredients as well as the fermentation and cooking times and temperatures of a loaf of bread just by smelling it. Kuroyanagi overhears, and, touched by his former master's praise of his talent, makes his decision: he will accept Kirisaki's offer. This episode also shows a short clip of Takitate! Gohan which is a parody of the series. It is revealed at the end of the episode that Kawachi's hair was grown back at the end of the episode as well as the start of Yakitate!! 9
54	"The Bread Battle in Special Localities! In The End, He's a Pop Idol!"; Transliteration: "Gotōji pan taiketsu!! Nantettatte aidoru!" (Japanese: ご当地パン対決!! なんてったってアイドル!)	Tōru Yamada	Tetsuko Takahashi	November 15, 2005
The Yakitate! 9 begins. Pantasia's Kazuma Azuma is set up against St. Pierre's Takumi Tsubozuka, a member of CMAP (Cooking Meal Assemble People), a team of Japan's top celebrity chefs. The theme is Ōma and the task is to make a bread using the local seafood. The town's specialty, fatty tuna, is expensive and out of stock (thanks to Yukino buying up all the frozen stock beforehand to cripple the Pantasia team), and no more can be obtained as it is the off-season. Azuma and Kanmuri get the idea of using sea urchins, but Azuma tearfully implores Kawachi to make some poor quality French bread with a high moisture content while sending Kanmuri off to obtain a 'secret weapon'. Tsukino, Kawachi and Kuroyanagi both think Azuma has gone crazy when he stuffs the bread into a garbage bag, but Matsushiro senses that he has a plan up his sleeve.
55	"Awaken! Super Kuroyanagi!"; Transliteration: "Mezame yo!! Sūpā Kuroyanagi!" (Japanese: 目覚めよ!! スーパー黒柳!)	Hiroki Negishi	Akatsuki Yamatoya	November 22, 2005
The episode begins with the bake-off between Azuma and Tsubozuka. Azuma begins hollowing out the poor quality French loaf he had asked Kawachi to prepare for him in the previous episode and hammering the crust flat. Tsubozuka finishes baking first and puts his Super Toro Aburi up for Kuroyanagi, who, after tasting it, transforms into "Super Kuroyanagi", a lookalike of Vegeta from Dragon Ball Z. Kawachi panics, but Azuma serves Kuroyanagi his Ōma Ja-pan: Sea urchin Chawanmushi bread. Kuroyanagi tastes it, and after apparently not reacting at all, pronounces Azuma the winner. Tsubozuka, shocked, immediately starts accusing Kuroyanagi of being partial to Pantasia, but after tasting the bread himself, transforms into a lookalike of Kitaro from GeGeGe no Kitaro, down to Kitaro's signature needle-hair attack. Kuroyanagi explains that Tsubozuka lost points because he used avocado to bind the tuna to the pastry, thus losing points for not using local specialties, while Azuma used only local ingredients including organic free-range eggs (Kanmuri's 'secret weapon'), hammered the crust of the hollowed-out French loaf to create a watertight shell and fried the bread from his hollowed-out shell as croutons to mix with the eggs. Tsubozuka meekly accepts defeat, much to the shock of his raving fans, and meekly asks Azuma if they can be friends, to which Azuma cheerfully replies, "Yeah!"
56	"Kuroyanagi in Danger! The Lost Reactions"; Transliteration: "Ayaushi Kuroyanagi!! Ushinawareta riakushon" (Japanese: 危うし黒柳!! 失われたリアクション)	Keiko Oyamada	Kento Shimoyama	December 6, 2005
Due to an accident, Kuroyanagi loses his sense of taste. Azuma's opponent is Ken Matsushiro's old friend Ryuu Roumen, the ramen chef from Episode 14. The theme is Ōkuchi and this time the bread has been decided: Chinese-style steamed pork dumplings. After multiple edible experiments including eating pig swill, Kuroyanagi realizes his sense of taste is gone. He fears he might have to quit being the judge of the Yakitate! 9. The Pantasia team is terrified at having to face off against a professional Chinese chef, but Azuma suddenly comes up with a plan. On the day of the bake-off, Roumen finishes first, but the dumplings are judged by Coo, Meister Kirisaki's pet peacock, who gives them a perfect score by his display of tail feathers. A miserable Kuroyanagi is about to resign as the judge, but Azuma serves him his Tenobe dumplings, which miraculously restore Kuroyanagi's sense of taste. Kuroyanagi pronounces Pantasia the winners as the only local specialty Roumen had used was the Ōkuchi black pork, while Azuma had made the filling out of local ingredients including katsuobushi and sweet potato wine, and used Tenobe noodle dough instead of regular dumpling dough to provide a complementary texture to the pork. The episode ends with Roumen and Kuroyanagi fighting over the last of Roumen's dumplings, while Coo flies off into the sunset. This episode parodied the long-running animated series One Piece
57	"Ooo, Mango! CMAP's Big Counterattack!"; Transliteration: "Ū, mangō!! CMAP no daigyakushū!" (Japanese: ウー、マンゴー!! CMAPの大逆襲！)	Kiyoshi Fukumoto	Toshifumi Kawase	December 13, 2005
Tsukino walks into her new office to catch Azuma, Kawachi and Kanmuri getting massages and acupuncture from Takumi Tsubozuka, who has now quit CMAP. The rest of the CMAP members, Hiroshi Kaname, Shizuto Narumi, and Go Chimatsuri, all of whom are at loggerheads with each other, are coerced by Yuuichi Kirisaki into working together for the next match: Kaname buys the ingredients and Narumi makes the filling for the bread, while Chimatsuri, who possesses the Flame Arm, will do the actual baking. The theme is Saito and the task is to make a bread with the region's local mangoes. While the Pantasia team is out buying mangoes, the CMAP team passes by and starts insulting them, as well as making fun of Takumi for deserting them. An enraged Azuma tongue-lashes them fiercely before being pulled away by Kanmuri. After buying the mangoes, the team tries to make waffles with them, but fails miserably because the waffles fall apart immediately after cooking. Kanmuri considers flash-freezing the mangoes before adding them to the filling, and Azuma seems to get another idea of how to mould the waffles by looking at a little clay haniwa idol. On the day of the match itself, Matsushiro, in the audience, gasps at the sight of the CMAP team's mango curry being cooked in demi-glace sauce; he furiously explains to Kawachi that the filling in curry breads has to be relatively dry and strongly flavored so that the bread will not go soggy. Kawachi panics when Kaname points out that Azuma has added fruit juice directly to the dough, rather than boiling it beforehand to neutralize the proteases in the juice. Does Azuma really have a plan to counter the CMAP offensive?
58	"Love Will Rescue Saito As Well! Solar Hands vs The Flame Arm!"; Transliteration: "Ai wa Saito mo sukuu!! Taiyō no te VS honō no ude!" (Japanese: 愛は西都も救う!! 太陽の手VS炎の腕！)	Takashi Ikehata	Yoshiyuki Kimura	December 20, 2005
CMAP has finished their mango curry bread and serves it up for Kuroyanagi. Before he bites into it, a helicopter shows up with the CMAP team's "Goddess of Victory": a Malaysian tapir. After apparently not reacting at all, Kuroyanagi praises the CMAP team's mango curry bread, but then Azuma serves him his Saito Ja-pan: Mango Waffle Haniwa. Kuroyanagi and the tapir both eat it and are both transformed into haniwas. The doctor who treated Azuma and Kawachi during the opening of Episode 39 appears, and after listening to Kuroyanagi's heartbeat, pronounces Pantasia the winners. CMAP protests, but after eating the waffles themselves, all three of them are transformed into haniwas. The doctor explains that CMAP lost the match because their bread lacked the love that Kazuma put into the bread by painstakingly making his ingredients by hand, which was the same sort of love that the local farmers put into raising their mangoes. Azuma is worried about whether the CMAP team will be all right after their transformation, as the children in the audience are treating them like giant stuffed toys. Kanmuri sighs that Azuma's heart is too loving for this world.
59	"Nin, nin, nin! My Way of Ninja!"; Transliteration: "Nin nin nin!! Ore no nindō datteba yo!" (Japanese: ニンニンニン!! オレの忍道だってばよ！)	Hirofumi Ogura	Akatsuki Yamatoya	January 10, 2006
The fourth match of Yakitate!! 9 begins and the theme is Ōmagari, a place which is famous for curved things such as bent houses. Pantasia's opponents are two mysterious ninjas and using the region's specialty, bent scallions, Azuma must make a Japan that will surely defeat his fierce opponents. Ironically, during the course of the episode, both teams independently come up with the same idea, down to the ingredients and styles of preparation; however, the St. Pierre ninjas have a secret technique that they believe will give them the edge. This episode parodied the popular anime series Naruto.
60	"I Hate All Things Twisted! Kai and Monica's Two-Person Tripod!"; Transliteration: "Magatta koto ga daikirai!! Kai to Monika no nininsankyaku!" (Japanese: 曲がったことが大キライ!! 戒とモニカの二人三脚！)	Tōru Yamada	Akatsuki Yamatoya	January 10, 2006
The two St. Pierre ninjas are unmasked as Kai Suwabara and Monica Adenauer, who are now lovers. As the Pantasia team leaves their dilapidated guesthouse, it suddenly falls apart and collapses flat on the ground as Kawachi shuts the door, apparently giving Azuma an idea. At the start of the match, both teams begin preparing their breads. Suwabara shocks the audience by twisting his dough into a giant spiral, but Azuma shocks Suwabara by folding his dough over twice. Kuroyanagi tastes Suwabara's bread and ends up twisting himself out of shape, but when he goes to taste Azuma's bread, Suwabara grabs it out of his hand and takes off. In an attempt to distract the audience, Suwabara throws pieces of Azuma's bread into their mouths, causing them to fold over backwards. Monica almost tearfully implores the Pantasia team to find Suwabara and prevent him from committing harakiri as he said he would if he lost to Azuma. Using Kuroyanagi as a sniffer, they track Suwabara to a river, where he is about to stab himself. He is deaf to all their pleas, but everyone is struck dumb when Ken Matsushiro reveals that Monica is pregnant. Later, when they are alone, Suwabara tells Monica a tragic story of his abandonment by his father, but promises to be the sort of father that his child will look up to. He attempts to propose to Monica, who accepts before he can speak, rushing into his arms and hugging him. Tsukino asks Matsushiro why he had to tell such a daring lie, but Matsushiro's ambiguous answer leaves her dumbstruck. The episode ends with Suwabara and Monica in a tender embrace as the sun goes down over the river.
61	"Kanmuri's Secret! A Jam Showdown Without Moral Codes!"; Transliteration: "Kanmuri no himitsu!! Jingi naki jamu taiketsu!" (Japanese: 冠の秘密!! 仁義なきジャム対決！)	Yoshihisa Matsumoto	Tetsuko Takahashi	January 17, 2006
When a platoon of limousines full of black-suited shade-wearing men pulls up in front of Pantasia, Ken Matsushiro single-handedly takes them on when they attempt to storm the store, but the men fall back and bow when Kanmuri steps out. Kanmuri explains that he is one of the two sons and potential heirs to Yazuka leader Takashi Hashiguchi (an obvious self-reference by the author), leader of the biggest Yakuza syndicate in Japan. The other is his older half-brother, Masanobu Tsutsumi, a cook in the Austrian court whose specialty is jam, which could be disastrous for Pantasia as the task for the next round is to make jam. Neither of the two brothers wants to succeed their father as a Yakuza leader, so they have made a bet that whoever loses the next match will have to abandon their culinary dreams and take over the syndicate. The team reaches the venue for the competition, Shinano, feeling optimistic, but their spirits collapse when Azuma collapses with a fever and is hospitalized. Kanmuri and Kawachi pick up some rhubarb and inadvertently blurt out their plans when buying sweet wine at a wine shop, but Tsutsumi runs into them and casually reveals his plan to use Calvados in his jam. Despite Kawachi's attempts to cheer him up, Kanmuri is depressed...until Azuma, who has escaped from hospital, turns up at their lodge and encourages Kanmuri to keep going and never give up.
62	"The Sibling Showdown! The First-Class Man Chosen By Dad!"; Transliteration: "Kyōdai kessen!! Chichi ga eranda ichiryū no otoko!" (Japanese: 兄弟決戦!! 父が選んだ一流の男!)	Keiko Oyamada	Toshifumi Kawase	January 24, 2006
Azuma's fever worsens despite Kawachi and Kanmuri's care. While nursing Azuma, Kawachi catches an unusual smell in the room that appears to come from the wood burning in the fireplace. This apparently gives Kanmuri an idea. On the day of the competition, Tsutsumi arrives with a pot made from volcanic rock and Kanmuri arrives with a log of apple-wood. The boys' father, Mr. Hashiguchi, who is in attendance, knows nothing about cookery, so he asks Matsushiro to fill him in. Tsutsumi makes a warm jam flambé that stuns the audience and when Kuroyanagi tastes it, he transforms into Uncle Jam from Anpanman and praises it highly. Kanmuri smokes his jam in apple-wood smoke; the smell of the smoke intoxicates Kuroyanagi and he begins walking toward it in a trance. Kuroyanagi declares the competition between the brothers a tie, but Tsutsumi accepts defeat. However, Mr. Hashiguchi allows his sons to continue their culinary careers; he has chosen Matsushiro as his successor, much to the latter's dismay.
63	"The Seaweed Bread Showdown! A Really Famous Person Is Going To Appear, You Know!"; Transliteration: "Nori pan taiketsu!! Chōyūmeijin ga deru n desu yo!" (Japanese: 海苔パン対決!! 超有名人が出るんですよ!)	Shinya Watada	Yoshiyuki Kimura	January 31, 2006
Pantasia leads the Yakitate!! 9 with 4 points to none and has drawn with St. Pierre in the fifth match. This could mean bad luck for the Pantasia team, as if St. Pierre wins the next match, they could take all of Pantasia's points and knock them out of the tournament. The theme for the next round is Uppurui and the task is to make a bread with nori, and with the Pantasia team having to face off against Miki Norihei, a famous chef who is renowned for his skills in preparing nori, the situation looks grim. Azuma considers brewing the nori in cola, and when Kawachi tastes it, he transforms into a Pepsiman lookalike and rescues a girl from drowning. On the day of the competition itself, Norihei wins the hearts of the crowd by offering them his nori spread, which intoxicates them and turns them into rabid fans singing his praises. Things do not look good for Pantasia...
64	"A Traditional Taste! The Heart That Thinks of Japan Is Just One!"; Transliteration: "Dentō no aji!! Nihon o omou kokoro wa hitotsu!" (Japanese: 伝統の味!! 日本を思うココロはひとつ!)	Takashi Ikehata	Kento Shimoyama	February 7, 2006
It's the middle of the sixth round of the Yakitate!! 9. Both Azuma and Norihei are using the same methods of baking, but while Azuma brews dried nori in cola and wraps it in rice paper, Norihei uses fresh nori and wraps it in filo pastry. Azuma finishes first and puts his bread up for Kuroyanagi, who, after eating it, performs a long and complicated reaction involving sixteen people with the same name and marrying a very ugly woman (only to divorce her while explaining his analysis of the bread). However, after eating Norihei's bread, Kuroyanagi's reaction causes the entire anime to briefly assume the painting style of Claude Monet. Kuroyanagi pronounces Norihei the winner, shocking and disheartening the entire Pantasia team. However, Norihei comes up to them and gives Azuma his book of nori recipes, and praises him on sharing the same goal as he: adapting Western food to Japanese palates and vice versa. The episode was filled with references to many artists including Sharaku, Edvard Munch, Vincent van Gogh, Pablo Picasso, Leonardo da Vinci, Roy Lichtenstein and Andy Warhol.
65	"The Fearful Revenge! The Panda Man Appears!"; Transliteration: "Kyōfu no ribenji!! Panda otoko, arawaru!" (Japanese: 恐怖のリベンジ!! パンダ男、現る!)	Tōru Yamada	Tetsuko Takahashi	February 14, 2006
The theme for the next round of the Yakitate!! 9 is Gero and the task is to make steamed buns: the kurikinton chestnut filling has been made beforehand so that both teams can focus solely on their bread-making. The Pantasia team, already down by five points, gets a shock when their next opponent is revealed to be a man in a panda suit, who Azuma immediately unmasks as Mokoyama once Tsukino's little sister Mizuno appears beside him. Panda reveals his ultimate weapon...Super Baking Powder. The Pantasia team narrowly escapes a train accident when they are left behind at a station, later revealed to be a trap by Yuuichi Kirisaki. As the team relaxes in a hot spring with bamboo leaves falling into the water around them, the smell of the leaves gives Azuma an idea and the team leaps out of the spring, narrowly escaping a bear attack (another trap by Kirisaki). The match takes place in the next episode, and it is revealed that Panda's baking powder causes dough to puff out and burst multiple times. Can Azuma really think of an idea to beat this ultimate weapon?
66	"The Miraculous Steamed Bread! The Day Panda Became a Panda!"; Transliteration: "Kiseki no mushi pan!! Panda ga panda ni natta hi!" (Japanese: 奇跡の蒸しぱん!!パンダがパンダになった日!)	Yoshihisa Matsumoto	Toshifumi Kawase	February 21, 2006
As the match kicks off, Azuma shocks everyone by pulling out dough that looks as though it was made in advance: a bullet-riddled Matsushiro explains that Azuma used the Old Noodle Method of kneading old and flavourful dough into new dough to make it fluffy. Panda finishes his "Triple Alpine Steamed Bun" and serves it to Kuroyanagi, who takes off and explodes three times like a rocket, only to reveal it was a robotic lookalike. Kuroyanagi praises Panda's tactic of freezing the kurikinton filling to use it as a temperature bridge to allow the liquid dough to explode at different rates; however, a bamboo smell permeates through the air and distracts everyone. Azuma serves Kuroyanagi his Gero Ja-pan: "Triple Bamboo Leaf" manju, which turns him into a Noh actor. In his guise, Kuroyanagi cuts down a few lengths of bamboo with a sword and poses as a tree, allowing the sprigs to stick into his arms. He pronounces Pantasia the winners, but when Mizuno protests, Kuroyanagi faints from blood loss when the bamboo sprigs puncture his arms. Mokoyama explains that he lost because he made his dough to a consistency similar to cake batter, thus making the bun too Western-style and resulting in incompatibility with the kurikinton filling, while Azuma used bamboo tea to make his bread and steamed it in bamboo-infused hot spring water to preserve the traditional Japanese taste: the bamboo aroma has even transformed Mokoyama into an actual panda. The episode ends with Mokoyama, who has now found peace with himself, giving Mizuno a ride home on his back.
67	"The Sun VS The Blizzard! The Ultimate Tart Showdown!"; Transliteration: "Taiyō VS fubuki!! Kyūkyoku no taruto taiketsu!" (Japanese: 太陽VS吹雪!! 究極のタルト対決!)	Keiko Oyamada	Yoshiyuki Kimura	February 28, 2006
Kazuma vs Yukino in the semi-final of Yakitate!! 9. The theme is Tomiura and they must make a tart from the fruit grown there: either strawberries or loquats. After a look around town Kazuma sees Yukino beat an old man because of his poor loquat preservatives. Kazuma makes a promise to the old man to use his loquats in his tart during the match so he can prove to Yukino they truly are delicious. At the match itself, Yukino stuns the audience by folding her dough in butter rather than the other way round, but Kazuma shocks everyone by folding his dough so thin it is almost invisible. Both Kazuma and Yukino finish their tarts at the same time and rush them to Kuroyanagi, knocking him down in the process. Can preservatives really beat fresh fruits?
68	"Is This the Path I Must Take?! The Road of the Loquat"; Transliteration: "Kore ga watashi no susumu michi!? Rōdo obu za biwa" (Japanese: これが私の進む道!? ロード・オブ・ザ・ビワ)	Hirofumi Ogura	Kento Shimoyama	March 7, 2006
Because of the rush to give Kuroyanagi the tarts in the previous episode, his reaction turns this episode into a parody of The Lord of the Rings with elements of The Chronicles of Narnia, starring Azuma as Frodo, Kawachi as Sam, Kanmuri as Legolas, Ken Matsushiro as Gimli, Tsukino as Arwen, the old man at the loquat store as Gollum, Meister Kirisaki as Gandalf, and Yukino as a cross between Sauron and the White Witch.
69	"Who Is It That You Will Give Truly Delicious Bread To?! The Japan, Forever!"; Transliteration: "Hontō ni umai pan o tabesaseru no wa!? Japan yo, eien ni!" (Japanese: 本当に美味いパンを食べさせるのは!? ジャぱんよ、永遠に!)	Teruo Satō	Katsuyuki Sumisawa	March 14, 2006
It's the final match of the Yakitate! 9 and Kazuma is up against Meister Kirisaki. Tsukino suddenly realizes that in the duration of the Yakitate! 9 tournament, Kazuma has not named a single bread 'Japan-number-something'. Matsushiro deduces that Kazuma's previous Japans were all experiments to create the perfect Japan, and he was now putting his final Japan up against Meister Kirisaki. After the two judges, Ryou Kuroyanagi and Pierrot Bolneze (the crown prince of Monaco) decide on a tie, its all up to Yuuichi Kirisaki, head of St. Pierre and the Meister's father. Surprisingly, after eating the bread, he declares Kazuma's bread the winner. Soon everyone learns the answer to the question of who you give your bread to. When you know your bread is good, you give it to everyone you want to taste it. You also want committed bread artisans to sample your bread. Throughout the episode, there are constant mentions of this being the series' last episode and the characters repeatedly question why they aren't given more screen time. Yukino Azusagawa even mentions that she was banned from interfering and sabotaging Pantasia; therefore she loses her chance to grab the spotlight one last time. When the reaction to Kazuma's Ultimate Japan wears off, Kirisaki sniggers at Kazuma and asks if his Japan is finally perfect, but Kazuma vows to keep experimenting and swears that one day he will beat Kirisaki with his Japan.
