= A Town Called Malice =

A Town Called Malice may refer to:

- Town Called Malice, a song by The Jam
- A Town Called Malice (TV series) a British crime thriller television series

== See also ==
- Malice (disambiguation)
