= Hotarubi (song) =

Single by Rythem
- B-side: "Natsu Mero"
- Released: July 18, 2007
- Genre: Pop
- Label: Sony Music Japan
- Songwriter(s): Yui Nītsu

Rythem singles chronology
"'Sakura Uta'" (2007)	"Hotarubi" (2007)	"'WINNER'" (2007)

"Hotarubi" (蛍火) ("Firefly-fire") is Rythem's twelfth single which was released on February 28, 2007, under Sony Music Entertainment Japan label. The title track was used as the ending theme for TV Tokyo's show FIGHTENSION☆SCHOOL. This single reached the #36 spot in the Oricon Singles Chart.

The item's stock number is AICL-1847.

== Track listing ==
1. Hotarubi
  Composition/Lyrics: Yui Nītsu
  Arrangement: Satoshi Takebe
2. Natsu Mero
  Composition/Lyrics: Yukari Katō
  Arrangement: Masuda TOSH
3. Hotarubi (instrumental)
4. Natsu Mero (instrumental)
