= Winner (Rythem song) =

"WINNER"

Single by Rythem
- B-side: "Kamereon Kamen"
- Released: October 10, 2007
- Genre: Pop
- Label: Sony Music Japan
- Songwriter(s): Rythem

Rythem singles chronology
"Hotarubi" (2007)	"WINNER" (2007)	"Bitter & Sweet" (2007)

"Winner" is Rythem's thirteenth single. It was released on October 10, 2007, by Sony Music Entertainment Japan. The title track was used as the theme song for NHK's Minna no Uta for the month of October to November 2007. The single reached number 52 on the Oricon weekly charts.

== Track listing ==
1. WINNER
  Composition/Lyrics: Rythem
  Arrangement: Masuda TOSH
2. Kamereon Kamen
  Composition/Lyrics: Yui Nītsu
  Arrangement: Masuda TOSH
3. WINNER (Karaoke)
