= Rythem =

Japanese pop duo

- Also known as: Rhythm
- Origin: Japan
- Genre: J-pop
- Years active: 2003–2011; 2021–present
- Label: Sony Music Entertainment Japan
- Past members: Yui Nītsu; Yukari Katō
- Website: Official website

Rythem (リズム, Rizumu) is a Japanese pop duo signed to Sony Music Japan consisting of two female members, vocalist/pianist Yui Nītsu (新津 由衣, Nītsu Yui; born August 17, 1985) and vocalist/guitarist Yukari Katō (加藤 有加利, Katō Yukari; born April 3, 1985). Rythem was active from 2003 until 2011; in 2021, they announced their return to performing on their official YouTube channel.

== History ==
In May 2003, while both performers were still high school seniors, Rythem's first single, "Harmonia", was released and was used as the second ending theme song for the anime Naruto. Four more singles, including the theme song for With the Light and their debut album Utatane, were released before "Hōki Gumo" was released in early 2005 as a single for the first opening theme of Yakitate!! Japan.

Their eighth single, "20 Tsubu no Kokoro", was a collection of songs dedicated by Yui and Yuka to each other. The ninth single, "Kokoro Bīdama" was used as the sixth and final ending theme song of Yakitate!! Japan. The tenth single, "Negai" and was used as the ending theme of the Nippon TV show Sukkiri (スッキリ). Rythem's second album (along with an accompanying DVD) was released in May and June 2006; it compiles their post-UTATANE works and includes full-length versions of short pieces originally performed on their weekly radio show.

In late 2006, Rythem performed a series of live concerts entitled "Acoustic Pop", before releasing another single, "Sakura Uta" (or 'song of the cherry blossoms'), in early 2007. As well as being a tie-in for the anime series Deltora Quest (first ending theme), the single also marks the beginning of the "Third Stage" or Rythem's venture into the music arena.

Their twelfth single, "Hotarubi" or 'firefly', originally scheduled for release in August 2006, was postponed and released on July 18, 2007. Their album 23 was released on October 1, 2008.

Both members have written songs for other artists. Yuka wrote two songs, "Moment" and "I my me", for Yui Horie, and wrote the lyrics for all the songs of Rie Tanaka's album, Kokoro, released October 20, 2010. Yui contributed a composition ("Frame") for the same album of Tanaka's, wrote "Milk" for Rina Sakamoto, and recorded a duet ("Laundry") with Rie fu for the album, at Rie sessions.

=== Breakup ===
Rythem announced on October 24, 2010, on a live streaming video that all activities of Rythem would end on February 27, 2011, following the group's "Final Fantasy Live: The Best Rhythm in Rythem's History" performance. Their last single, "A Flower", was released on November 10, 2010; their final album, Rythem, was released on December 8, 2010.

A complete box set of 5 Blu-spec CDs and 5 DVDs, "RYTHEM COMPLETE BOX～Music of the people, by the people, for the people", was scheduled for release on May 25, 2011. It has a full collection of all their songs (a total of 72), including a new song called "Ai no Kotoba" (Words of Love). The DVDs contain all their music videos, footage of their final live performance, and documentaries of their seven years of publicity and interviews. Along with the ten discs, the box shipped with a booklet and a pair of character figurines of the duo, which were designed by Yui herself.

In the official announcement on their homepage, Yui and Yuka stated that they will use their full names to perform music in the future. Yui and Yuka have already begun work as solo artists, with Yui changing her stage name to "Neat's". Yuka mentioned in an update to subscribers of her mailing list on March 11, 2011, that she has been recording demos, and it was announced that Yui will perform in a charity event, "&SACHI vol.HOPE", on May 24, 2011, as a guest.

=== Comeback ===
In early 2021, Rythem launched new official YouTube, Twitter, and Instagram accounts. They began uploading photos of the band's history in anticipation of a livestream to be held the 21st of May. In the livestream, they announced the duo would be resuming activities. They also re-launched their website and fan community, now called Rythem's Garden (リズムの森, Rizumu no Mori). Both performers still intend to continue their respective solo careers.

== Discography ==
Studio albums

- Utatane
- Mugen Factory
- 23
- Rythem

Compilation albums

- Best Story
- RYTHEM COMPLETE BOX～Music of the people, by the people, for the people

=== Singles ===
1. Harmonia - Released: May 21, 2003
2. Tenkyu (New Summer Version) - Released: August 6, 2003
3. Blue Sky Blue - Released: November 9, 2003
4. Hitoritabi Shararuran - Released: April 21, 2004
5. Mangekyō Kirakira - Released: May 26, 2004
6. Houki Gumo - Released: January 26, 2005
7. Mikazuki Rhapsody - Released: August 24, 2005
8. 20 Tsubu no Kokoro - Released: January 1, 2006
9. Kokoro Bīdama - Released: March 1, 2006
10. Negai - Released: April 26, 2006
11. Sakura Uta - Released: February 28, 2007
12. Hotarubi - Released: July 18, 2007
13. WINNER - Released: October 10, 2007
14. Bitter & Sweet - Released: November 17, 2007
15. Kubisuji Line - Released: February 10, 2008
16. Love Call/Akari no Arika - Released: July 23, 2008
17. Gyuttoshite - Released: July 29, 2009
18. Tsunaide te - Released: November 11, 2009
19. Mudai - Released: July 7, 2010
20. A Flower - Released: November 10, 2010
