= Negai (Rythem song) =

Single by Rythem

from the album Mugen Factory
- B-side: "Picasso no Kyuujitsu"
- Released: April 26, 2006
- Genre: Pop
- Label: Sony Music Japan
- Songwriter(s): Rythem

Rythem singles chronology
"'Kokoro Bīdama'" (2006)	"Negai" (2006)	"'Sakura Uta'" (2007)

"Negai" (願い) is the J-pop duo Rythem's tenth single and was released on March 1, 2006 under Sony Music Entertainment Japan label. The title track was used as the ending theme for the Nippon Television's TV show Soukai Jouhou BARAETI SUKKIRI!!. This single was able to land on the #41 spot in the Oricon weekly charts on its first week.

The item's stock number is AICL-1743.

== Track listing ==
1. Negai
  Composition/Lyrics: Rythem
  Arrangement: Toshiyuki Mori
2. Picasso no Kyuujitsu
  Composition: Yui Nītsu
  Arrangement: CHOKKAKU
  Lyrics: Rythem
3. Negai (instrumental)
