= Curiouser and Curiouser =

Curiouser and Curiouser or curiouser and curiouser may refer to:

- "Curiouser and curiouser!", a quote from Alice's Adventures in Wonderland

== Literature ==
- Curiouser and Curiouser, a 1932 volume of poems for children by Caryl Brahms
- "Curiouser and Curiouser" a DC comic book by Kyle Higgins
- Curiouser and Curiouser, a 1940 autobiography by Dorothy Rice Sims
- Curiouser and Curiouser, a 1961 book of chess variations by V. R. Parton
- Curiouser and Curiouser: Dr. Magnus Pyke's Amazing A-Z of Scientific Facts, a 1983 book by Magnus Pyke
- Curiouser and Curiouser: The Best of Sue Arnold, a 1985 book by Sue Arnold
- "Curiouser and Curiouser", a manga of Bizenghast
- Curiouser and Curiouser: Essays a 2017 book by Nicholas Delbanco

== Music ==
- "Curiouser and Curiouser", music from Star Trek: Prodigy season 1
- Curiouser and Curiouser, a 1981 EP by Chemical Alice with Mark Kelly

== Television ==
- "Curiouser and Curiouser", an episode of Mayfair Witches
- "Curiouser and Curiouser!! The Truth About the Kaysers!" a Yakitate!! Japan episode
- "Curiouser and Curiouser", a 1995 episode of Forever Knight
- "Curiouser and Curiouser!" (Ted Lasso), a 2026 episode of Ted Lasso
- "Curiouser and Curiouser", a 1996 episode of L.A. Firefighters

== Other uses ==
- Curiouser and Curiouser, a line of beers by Curious Brewing
