= Kubisuji Line =

- Limited Edition

Single by Rythem
- Released: February 20, 2008
- Genre: Pop
- Label: Sony Music Japan
- Songwriter(s): Yui Nītsu

Rythem singles chronology
"'Bitter & Sweet'" (2007)	"Kubisuji Line" (2008)	"'Love Call/Akari no Arika'" (2008)

Alternative cover
- Regular Edition

"Kubisuji Line" (首すじライン) is Rythem's fourteenth (fifteenth overall) single. It was released on February 20, 2008 under the Sony Music Entertainment Japan label. The title track was used as the theme song for Nikkatsu Co. Ltd.'s film entitled Naoko. "Aishikata" was used as the campaign song for Nippon Travel Agency Co., Ltd.'s Akai Fuusen Sotsugyou Ryoukou. While "Nekoze (acoustic version)" was used as the theme song for Nippon TV's Shiawase no Shokutaku.

This single contains a limited and regular edition and these two editions have different track listing. The item's stock number is AICL-1916.

== Limited edition track listing ==
1. Kubisuji Line
  Composition/Lyrics: Yui Nītsu
  Arrangement: Shin Kouno
2. Aishikata
  Composition/Lyrics: Yui Nītsu
  Arrangement: Shin Kouno
3. Nekoze (acoustic version)
  Composition/Lyrics: Yui Nītsu
  Arrangement: Yuuta Saitou

== Regular edition track listing ==
1. Kubisuji Line
2. Aishikata
3. Kubisuji Line (acoustic version)
4. Kubisuji Line (Minus YUI vocal)
5. Kubisuji Line (Minus YUKA vocal)

== Charts and sales ==
Oricon Ranking (Weekly)	Sales
24	6,781
