= Super Yo-Yo =

Japanese manga and anime series

- Cover of Super Yo-Yo volume 1

超速スピナー (Chōsoku Supinā)
- Genre: Sports (Yo-yo)
- Manga
- Written by: Takashi Hashiguchi
- Published by: Shogakukan
- English publisher: SG: Chuang Yi
- Magazine: CoroCoro Comic
- Original run: 1997 – 2000
- Volumes: 7
- Anime television series
- Directed by: Takao Kato
- Produced by: Toshihiro Nakazawa
- Written by: Katsuyuki Sumisawa
- Music by: Tetsuya Yamamoto
- Studio: Xebec
- Licensed by: SG: Odex
- Original network: TV Tokyo
- Original run: December 1, 1998 – September 10, 1999
- Episodes: 22

Super Yo-Yo (Note: Having never been licensed in North America and the United Kingdom, this manga and its anime adaptation are most commonly known as Chōsoku Spinner. Super Yo-Yo is the title of both the Singaporean English edition of the manga and English dub of the anime, and it is the one adopted in this article.) (Japanese: 超速スピナー, Hepburn: Chōsoku Supinā; lit. 'Ultra-fast Spinner') is a Japanese manga series written and illustrated by Takashi Hashiguchi. The series was serialized in Shogakukan's CoroCoro Comic magazine between December 1997 and August 2000, and was translated into English and published in Singapore by Chuang Yi.

In 1998, the manga series was adapted into a 22-episode anime television series produced by Xebec, it ran from November 1998 to September 1999. The television series has been dubbed into English in Singapore by Odex and released in 2003.

A Game Boy video game adaptation has been published by Hudson Soft in Japan on September 18, 1998.

== Plot ==
Shun'ichi Domoto is a 5th grade boy. He usually helps the sport teams in his school due to his talent in sports. One day his friend, Beso Kimura lost his Yoyo in a Yoyo duel against a bully boy, Benkei Musashimaru and ask Shun'ichi for help. Shun'ichi challenges Benkei to a Yoyo duel then defeats him. After that he was challenged by the exceptionally gifted Yoyoer, Seito Hojoin and get beaten because he ridiculed the Yoyo game. So, Shun'ichi enters Japan's Yoyo championship to get his revenge from his loss with Seito. Throughout this Championship, he learns new Yoyo Skills, meets new friends and powerful rivals.

== Manga volume list ==
No.	Japanese release date	Japanese ISBN
1	April 25, 1998	4-09-142611-5
1. Yōyō to no deai (ヨーヨーとの出会い; lit. Encounter with the Yo-yo); 2. Raibaru no ōkisa (ライバルの大きさ; lit. The Size of the Rival); 3. Aitsu to tatakau tame ni (あいつと戦うために; lit. In Order to Fight Him); 4. Moero! Supinā (燃えろ！スピナー; lit. Burn! Spinner)
2	August 25, 1998	4-09-142612-3
1. Fuan notatakai (不安の戦い; lit. Battle of Anxiety); 2. Shun'ichi ryū kōryaku hō (瞬一流攻略法; lit. Shun'ichi-Style Capture Method); 3. Sorezore no omoi (それぞれの思い; lit. Feelings of Each One); 4. Kirisaki Mai no jitsuryoku (霧崎マイの実力; lit. Ability of Kirisaki Mai); 5. Shōri no yukue (勝利の行方; lit. Whereabouts of Victory); Side story: Nakamura Meijin monogatari (中村名人物語; lit. Master Nakamura Story)
3	February 25, 1999	4-09-142613-1
1. Yureru omoi (ゆれる想い; lit. Feelings Swaying); 2. Mayoi (迷い; lit. Ambivalence); 3. Haipādoragon (ハイパードラゴン; lit. Hyper Dragon); 4. Shukumei no taiketsu (宿命の対決; lit. Fateful Showdown); 5. Shitōnohateni (死闘の果てに; lit. The Ends of the Desperate Struggle); Side story: Omoide no yōyō (思い出のヨーヨー; lit. Yo-yo of Memories)
4	May 25, 1999	4-09-142614-X
1. Irai (依頼; lit. Request); 2. Shun'ichi kanzen fukkatsu!! (瞬一完全復活!!; lit. Shun'ichi Full Revival!!); 3. Hōjōin no ketsui (北条院の決意; lit. Determination of Hojoin); 4. Sabaibaru rēsu (サバイバルレース; lit. Survival Race); Side story: Dī purojekuto tanjō hiwa (Dプロジェクト誕生秘話; lit. D Project Birth Secret Story); Side story: Chōsen! Chīmupurei (挑戦！チームプレイ; lit. Challenge! Team Play)
5	October 25, 1999	4-09-142615-8
1. Chīmuwāku (チームワーク; lit. Teamwork); 2. Saishū kanmon (最終関門; lit. Final Barrier); 3. Doragon chippu no shōtai (ドラゴンチップの正体; lit. Identity of the Dragon Chip); 4. Chōetsu (超越; lit. Transcendence); Side story: Yōyōman 99 (ヨーヨーマン99; lit. Yo-yo Man 99); Side story: Yōyō ki mo dame shi (ヨーヨーきもだめし; lit. Yo-yo Test of Courage)
6	March 25, 2000	4-09-142616-6
1. Sekai e no michi (世界への道; lit. The Road to the World); 2. Shidō (始動; lit. Start-up); 3. Omowanu kiki (思わぬ危機; lit. Crisis Unexpected); 4. Tōnamento kaishi!! (トーナメント開始!!; lit. Start of the Tournament!!); 5. Shōbu no kagi (勝負のカギ; lit. Key to the Game); Side story: Yō Yūki!? (Yo遊記!?; lit. Yo Play Story)
7	October 25, 2000	4-09-142617-4
1. Hokori o kakete (誇りをかけて; lit. Pride on the Line); 2. Shōri no supīdo (勝利のスピード; lit. Speed of Victory); 3. Zenkai no chikara de (全開の力で; lit. With All Strength); 4. Kiken'nasaikai (危険な再会; lit. Dangerous Reunion); 5. Zettai zetsumei!? (絶対絶命!?; lit. Complete Annihilation?!); 6. Mugen no ashita e (無限のあしたへ; lit. To Tomorrow Infinite)

== Anime ==
=== Cast ===
- Shun'ichi Domoto (堂本 瞬一, Dōmoto Shun'ichi): Voiced by: Showtaro Morikubo
- Seito Hojoin (北条院 聖斗, Hōjōin Seito): Voiced by: Yūji Ueda, Ai Orikasa (childhood)
- Chuta Kogure (小暮 宙太, Kogure Chūta): Voiced by: Saori Higashi
- Mai Kirisaki (霧崎 マイ, Kirisaki Mai): Voiced by: Makiko Ohmoto
- Rian Yumemiya (夢宮 りあん, Yumemiya Rian): Voiced by: Chiemi Chiba
- Beso Kimura (木村 ベソ, Kimura Beso): Voiced by: Junko Noda
- Jienma Ano (安濃 慈円馬, Anō Jienma): Voiced by: Yuuki Matsuda
- Benkei Musashimaru (武蔵丸 弁慶, Musashimaru Benkei): Voiced by: Takuma Suzuki
- Master Nakamura (中村 名人, Nakamura Meijin): Voiced by: Shin-ichiro Miki, Noriko Hidaka (childhood)
- Tsuyoshi Whapa (輪刃 剛志, Wappa Tsuyoshi): Voiced by: Kōichi Tōchika
- Daiki Akagi (赤城 大樹, Akagi Daiki): Voiced by: Kenichi Suzumura

=== Music ===
==== Opening themes ====
- "SOMEDAY LET'S GO TOGETHER" performed by rub-down (Episodes 1–14).
- "Loop & Loop" performed by Showtaro Morikubo (who also voiced the main character) (Episodes 15–22).

==== Ending theme ====
- "Future" performed by Chiaki Nakajima.

==== Soundtrack ====
A soundtrack album titled Haipā Saundo Gigusu "Chōsoku Supinā" Ongaku Shū (ハイパー・サウンド・ギグス「超速スピナー」音楽集; lit. Hyper Sound Gigs "Ultra-fast Spinner" Music Collection) has been released by Polystar in Japan on September 1, 1999.

No.	Title	Lyrics	Music	Length
1.	"SOMEDAY LET'S GO TOGETHER" (performed by rub-down)	Mitachi Yori Asa	Sugiuchi Shinsuke	3:54
2.	"Future" (performed by Chiaki Nakajima)	Masumi Kawamura, Yuno Zen Kisato	Ogura Ryo	4:16
3.	"LOOP & LOOP" (performed by Morikubo Shotaro)	Mitsuko Shiramine	Orenji	4:26
4.	"LOOP GIG FOR 堂本瞬一" (Dōmoto Shun'ichi)		Tetsuya Yamamoto	4:10
5.	"LOOP GIG FOR 北条院聖斗" (Hojoin Seito)		Tetsuya Yamamoto	4:10
6.	"LOOP GIG FOR 夢宮りあん" (Yumemiya Rian)		Tetsuya Yamamoto	1:57
7.	"LOOP GIG FOR 武蔵丸弁慶" (Musashimaru Benkei)		Tetsuya Yamamoto	3:03
8.	"LOOP GIG FOR 小暮宙太" (Kogure Chuta)		Tetsuya Yamamoto	2:53
9.	"LOOP GIG FOR 輪刃剛志" (Waha Tsuyoshi)		Tetsuya Yamamoto	2:59
10.	"LOOP GIG FOR 霧崎マイ" (Kirisaki Mai)		Tetsuya Yamamoto	4:09
11.	"CHAMPION SHIP"		Tetsuya Yamamoto	2:11
12.	"NOCTURNE FOR A GENIUS"		Tetsuya Yamamoto	1:18
13.	"MYSTERIOUS GIRL"		Tetsuya Yamamoto	2:42
14.	"SCHOOL DAYS"		Tetsuya Yamamoto	1:54
15.	"LOOP & LOOP (H.S.G. VERSION)" (performed by Morikubo Shotaro)	Mitsuko Shiramine	Orenji	4:26
Total length:				48:56

=== Episode list ===
No.	Title	Original release date
1	"Yōyō to no deai" (ヨーヨーとの出会い)	November 30, 1998
2	"Raibaru no ōkisa" (ライバルの大きさ)	December 7, 1998
3	"Aitsu to tatakau tame ni" (あいつと戦うために)	December 14, 1998
4	"Japan chanpion kānibaru kaisai" (ジャパンチャンピオンカーニバル開催)	December 21, 1998
5	"Shutsujō ken o kakete" (出場権をかけて)	January 18, 1999
6	"Michi no haipā doragon" (未知のハイパードラゴン)	January 25, 1999
7	"Shun'ichi nagare kōryaku hō" (瞬一流攻略法)	February 15, 1999
Shun'ichi begin his second half of first round qualification despite not knowing any Hyper-level technique. He gets by observing other participants techniques and proceeds to instantly copy them.
8	"Raibaru ga iru kara koso" (ライバルがいるからこそ)	February 22, 1999
Filler episode that shows a character meet an African-american playing yoyo
9	"Yōyō man sanjō" (YOYOマン参上)	March 15, 1999
A UFO yoyo arrives in Shun'ichi's home and warns him about evil yoyo spirit who possess people. This episode pays homage to devilman.
10	"Sorezore no omoi" (それぞれの思い)	March 22, 1999
The Kanto's strongest player's defeat left Shun'ichi wonder what Mai's secret might be. The crew watching together footage to find any record of Mai but found nothing. the quarterfinalists then proceed into second round of the tournament.
11	"Shōto sutoringusu no Kirisaki Mai" (ショートストリングスの霧崎マイ)	April 12, 1999
Second round of the tournament took place within virtual space. Spinners fight 1v1 by riding a hoverboard that moves according to techniques they use. Shun'ichi appear dominant through most of the track then Mai Kirisaki start using hyper-level techniques and overtake Shun'ichi.
12	"Saibāsupēsu no tatakai" (サイバースペースの戦い)	April 19, 1999
Mai Kirisaki continues to dominating their race. Meanwhile Seito, Chūta and Benkei win their qualification due to their opponent drop off their hoverboard.
13	"Shōri no yukue" (勝利の行方)	May 10, 1999
14	"Shōgeki no kokuhaku" (衝撃の告白)	May 17, 1999
15	"Higeki no hamon" (悲劇の波紋)	June 7, 1999
16	"Arashi no junkesshō" (嵐の準決勝)	June 14, 1999
17	"Ame no hōmonsha" (雨の訪問者)	July 5, 1999
18	"Dī purojekuto no nazo" (Dプロジェクトの謎)	July 12, 1999
19	"Omoide no yōyō" (思い出のヨーヨー)	August 2, 1999
20	"Futatsu no doragon" (ふたつのドラゴン)	August 9, 1999
21	"Shukumei no taiketsu" (宿命の対決)	August 30, 1999
22	"Shitō no hateni" (死闘の果てに)	September 6, 1999

=== Release ===
The anime series has been released on VHS in 5 volumes by Bandai Visual.

Volume	Episodes	Runtime	Release date
1	1 – 5	111 minutes	May 25, 1999
2	6 – 10	111 minutes	July 25, 1999
3	11 – 14	90 minutes	September 25, 1999
4	15 – 18	75 minutes	November 25, 1999
5	19 – 22	75 minutes	January 25, 2000
