= Saijō no Meii =

Japanese manga series

- Manga volume 1 cover

最上の命医
- Genre: Medical
- Manga
- Written by: Kenzō Irie
- Illustrated by: Takashi Hashiguchi
- Published by: Shogakukan
- Imprint: Shōnen Sunday Comics
- Magazine: Weekly Shōnen Sunday
- Original run: December 5, 2007 – February 24, 2010
- Volumes: 11
- Manga

Saijō no Meii: The King of Neet
- Written by: Kenzō Irie
- Illustrated by: Takashi Hashiguchi
- Published by: Shogakukan
- Imprint: Shōnen Sunday Comics
- Magazine: Weekly Shōnen Sunday
- Original run: March 31, 2010 – April 30, 2014
- Volumes: 19
- Television drama
- Directed by: Manabu Aso (1–2, 10); Hisashi Kimura (3, 4–8); Kosuke Suzuki (5–6, 9); Kazusuke Yagi (7)
- Produced by: Junpei Nakagawa; Futoshi Asano; Tsuyoshi Sato; Tomoyo Nihei
- Written by: Erika Yoshida; Takeshi Miyamoto
- Music by: Kōji Endō
- Original network: TV Tokyo
- Original run: January 10, 2011 – March 14, 2011
- Episodes: 10
- icon

Saijō no Meii (最上の命医; lit. 'The Best Skilled Surgeon') is a Japanese manga series written by Kenzō Irie and illustrated by Takashi Hashiguchi. It was serialized in Shogakukan's Weekly Shōnen Sunday from December 2007 to February 2010, with its chapters collected in 11 tankōbon volumes. A sequel, titled Saijō no Meii: The King of Neet, was serialized in the same magazine from March 2010 to April 2014, with its chapters collected in 19 tankōbon volumes.

A 10-episode Japanese television drama adaptation was broadcast on TV Tokyo from January to March 2011. Three special episodes aired in February 2016, August 2017 and October 2019.

== Media ==
=== Manga ===
Saijō no Meii', written by Kenzō Irie and illustrated by Takashi Hashiguchi, was serialized in Shogakukan's Weekly Shōnen Sunday from December 5, 2007, to February 24, 2010. Shogakukan collected its chapters in 11 tankōbon volumes, released from April 18, 2008, to June 19, 2010.

A sequel, titled Saijō no Meii: The King of Neet (最上の明医～ザ・キング・オブ・ニート～, Saijō no meii ~ Za Kingu Obu Nīto ~), was serialized in Weekly Shōnen Sunday from March 31, 2010, to April 30, 2014. Shogakukan collected its chapters in 19 tankōbon volumes, released from July 16, 2010, to June 18, 2014.

==== Saijō no Meii ====
No.	Japanese release date	Japanese ISBN
1	April 18, 2008	978-4-09-121385-3
2	February 18, 2008	978-4-09-121446-1
3	October 17, 2008	978-4-09-121499-7
4	January 16, 2009	978-4-09-121569-7
5	April 17, 2009	978-4-09-122003-5
6	July 17, 2009	978-4-09-121708-0
7	September 17, 2009	978-4-09-121746-2
8	December 18, 2009	978-4-09-122029-5
9	March 18, 2010	978-4-09-122187-2
10	April 16, 2010	978-4-09-122260-2
11	June 19, 2010	978-4-09-122416-3

==== Saijō no Meii: The King of Neet ====
No.	Japanese release date	Japanese ISBN
1	July 16, 2010	978-4-09-122418-7
2	October 18, 2010	978-4-09-122655-6
3	December 17, 2010	978-4-09-122718-8
4	February 18, 2011	978-4-09-122784-3
5	May 18, 2011	978-4-09-122874-1
6	August 18, 2011	978-4-09-123217-5
7	November 18, 2011	978-4-09-123385-1
8	February 17, 2012	978-4-09-123546-6
9	May 18, 2012	978-4-09-123659-3
10	August 17, 2012	978-4-09-123795-8
11	October 18, 2012	978-4-09-123890-0
12	December 18, 2012	978-4-09-124035-4
13	March 18, 2013	978-4-09-124196-2
14	June 18, 2013	978-4-09-124299-0
15	August 16, 2013	978-4-09-124375-1
16	November 18, 2013	978-4-09-124497-0
17	February 18, 2014	978-4-09-124563-2
18	April 18, 2014	978-4-09-124586-1
19	June 18, 2014	978-4-09-124649-3

=== Drama ===
A Japanese television drama adaptation was announced in October 2010. The series ran for 10 episodes on TV Tokyo from January 10 to March 14, 2011. 3 special episodes aired on February 10, 2016, August 23, 2017, and October 2, 2019.
