= Malice in Wonderland: The Dolls Movie =

Malice In Wonderland: The Dolls Movie
- Malice In Wonderland: The Dolls Movie DVD Cover
- Directed by: Russell Maynor
- Written by: Kenneth Ansloan
- Produced by: Sheryl Brown; Bill Moore
- Starring: Kenneth Ansloan; AJ Carian; Russell Maynor; Dean Squibb
- Distributed by: Dollicious Productions, LLC
- Release dates: October 9, 2010 (Southwest Gay & Lesbian Film Festival)
- Running time: 77 minutes
- Country: United States
- Language: English

Malice in Wonderland: The Dolls Movie is a 2010 drag comedy produced by Dollicious Productions LLC, directed by Russell Maynor, written by Kenneth Ansloan and performed by The Dolls, the notorious drag troupe from Albuquerque, New Mexico. It is a psychedelic mash-up of Lewis Carroll's Alice's Adventures in Wonderland and Mommie Dearest, with additional parody references to The Wizard of Oz, Mary Poppins, A Clockwork Orange and numerous other films. It is based on the original 2008 stage show of the same name and performed by The Dolls.

== Logline ==
"When her super-nanny goes postal, precocious Alice is thrown into a psychedelic Wonderland of fractured fairy tales and fabulous freaks in this bawdy drag queen mashup that would make Lewis Carrol [sic] roll over in his grave."

== Plot ==
Alice confronts frightening squawks and shrieks as she passes through the dark smokiness of the Mushroom Forest.

“Nanny Dearest” (a la “Joan Crawford” ) is hired as the new nanny for little Alice (Alice is played by a 30-year-old man in drag). Their relationship is strained, as Alice finds herself in service to Nanny's unrelenting demands. Alice is subjugated to bizarre psychological and physical abuses from Nanny, who quickly reveals herself as Alice's worse nightmare. The final conflict comes as a result of Alice's adoption of a white rabbit. Nanny Dearest forbids having a “rodent” as a pet (“They don't even make good coats!”) and sentences the bunny to death. Despite numerous creative attempts to put an end to him, Nanny takes increasingly severe action when the "damn rabbit keeps coming back." With Nanny's wickedness now revealed in full force, she instigates the ultimate solution, flushing the poor creature down the toilet. Engorged with her own mad power, Nanny flushes Alice down the “rabbit hole” as well. Alice lands in a surreal “Wonderland” (think Peter Max on acid) populated by perverse creatures.

Alice's white rabbit, now incarnated as a rapping, hip-hop “White Chocolate”, becomes the first of many encounters with eccentric characters who have found their way into Wonderland, including a boozy Glinda the Good Witch (who has a strange relationship with her munchkins), a hookah smoking Penispillar in his mushroom forest and a naughty Cheshire Cat. Then, after stumbling upon Trannie Dee and Trannie Dum's trailer park where Alice is introduced to a little Wonderland magic, the Mad Hatter serves up Titmouse tea at a truly twisted Tea Party.

"Off With Your Head" screeches the Red Queen from atop her throne. Alice recoils and cries "You're all crazy!"

When Alice ultimately crosses paths with the evil and insatiable Red Queen, she is offered her first Birthday Orgy. In a fit of jealousy, the king frames Alice with an illegal wire hanger, and the Queen invariably demands Alice's beheading. Barely escaping with her head, Alice returns to the “real world” where she recognizes her past sins of using wire hangers and not eating enough red meat. With her work done, Nanny declares “She's off, Chim Chimeree and all that”, to horrify another child... or so she thinks.

== History ==
Malice in Wonderland: the Dolls Movie had its premiere at the 2010 Southwest Gay and Lesbian Film Festival, which was followed up by substantial editing improvements and additions.

Writer Kenneth Ansloan has written and directed over 30 theater productions in this genre and this is his first work adapted to film.

== Technical ==
The film was shot entirely on green screen in the basement of a bank. The colorful backgrounds were drawn by Christina Bouajila and David Newman and colored in Photoshop. Much of the animation was accomplished in Motion.
