= Utatane =

Utatane (ウタタネ）

Studio album by RYTHEM
- Released: June 23, 2004
- Genre: J-Pop
- Length: 56:23
- Producer: Sony Music Japan

RYTHEM chronology
Utatane (ウタタネ） (2004)	Mugen Factory (2006)

Utatane is the first album from the Japanese duo RYTHEM, released in 2004.

== Track listing ==
1. "風船雲" (Fuusen Kumo) Balloon Cloud (4:02)
2. "ハルモニア" (HARUMONIA) Harmonia (4:16)
3. "一人旅シャラルラン" (Hitoritabi Shararuran) Travelling Alone (4:36)
4. "万華鏡キラキラ" (Mangekyou KIRAKIRA) Sparkly Kaleidoscope (4:32)
5. "Circulate" (4:37)
6. "小麦色のラブソング" (Komugiiro no RABUSONGU) Love Song of Cocoa Brown (6:18)
7. "EVERY" (4:53)
8. "てんきゅっ" (Tenkyu) Thank You (4:05)
9. "ブルースカイ・ブルー" (BURU- SUKAI BURU-) Blue Sky Blue (3:21)
10. "青春時代" (Seishun Jidai) Youthful Days (4:59)
11. "女友達" (Onna Tomodachi) Girlfriend (4:35)
12. "ラプンツェル" (RAPUNSHERU) Rapunzel (5:03)
13. "自由詩" (Jiyuu Shi) Freedom Poem (6:09)
