= Alice in Wonderland: A Dance Fantasy =

Alice in Wonderland is a 1993 ballet film with the Prague Chamber Ballet performing to a score by Viktor Kalabis performed by the Czech Philharmonic, based on Lewis Carroll's Alice in Wonderland and Through the Looking-Glass and the 1951 Disney film.

Eva Zamazalová portrays Alice. Adam Rezek directs.

== Scenes ==
- Down the looking glass
- The queen and her subjects
- Following the queen's footsteps
- The magical blackboard
- The chessboard pieces
- Alice's new friends
- The dance finale
