= Takashi Hashiguchi =

Japanese manga artist

- Born: June 2, 1967 (age 58); Tokyo, Japan
- Occupation: Manga artist
- Known for: Yakitate!! Japan

Takashi Hashiguchi (橋口 たかし, Hashiguchi Takashi; born June 2, 1967 in Tokyo) is a Japanese manga artist. He is best known for his manga series Yakitate!! Japan, for which he won the Shogakukan Manga Award for shōnen in 2004. Hashiguchi won a newcomer's award in 1987 (published in a magazine), and Combat Teacher debuted the following year in the same magazine.

A prevailing theme seen throughout his manga is the realization of childhood dreams, such as making bread in Yakitate!! Japan or becoming a yo-yo master in Super Yo-Yo. Hashiguchi mainly focuses on unusual occupations or sports.

He enjoys comedy as well, and took a brief interlude from drawing to try his luck as a comedian.

== Works ==
His works include:

- Combat Teacher (1988)
- Kinniku Kurabu (1991)
- Chie-Baachan No Chiebukuro (1992)
- Suto Ii Bashuko! Yon-Koma Gag Gaiden (1993)
- Caster Mairu Zo (1995)
- Windmill (1997)
- Super Yo-Yo (1997)
- Scissors (2000)
- Yakitate!! Japan (2002)
- Saijō no Meii (2007)
- Saijō no Meii: King of Neet (2010)
