= Love Call (Rythem song) =

"Love Call/Akari no Arika"
- Limited Edition

Single by Rythem
- Released: July 23, 2008
- Genre: Pop
- Label: Sony Music Japan
- Songwriter(s): Yui Nītsu & ISEKI

Rythem singles chronology
"'Kubisuji Line'" (2008)	"Love Call/Akari no Arika" (2008)

Alternative cover
- Regular Edition

"Love Call/Akari no Arika" (Love Call/あかりのありか) is Rythem's fifteenth (sixteenth overall) single and the duo's first double-A side and collaboration single (with the J-pop duo, Kimaguren). It was released on July 23, 2008 under Sony Music Entertainment Japan label. Love Call is used as an ending theme for the Nippon TV's drama Sukkiri!! making this the group's second tie-in with the said drama. Akari no Arika is also used as an ending theme for TV Tokyo's drama entitled "Hisho no Kagami" (秘書のカガミ).

The single comes in a limited (with DVD containing the PV for Love Call) and regular edition (CD only). The item's stock numbers are AICL-1953 (Limited Edition) and AICL-1954 (Regular Edition).

== Limited Edition Track listing ==
1. Love Call
  Composition: Yui Nītsu & ISEKI
  Arrangement: TAICHI MASTER
  Lyrics: Yui Nītsu
2. Akari no Arika
  Composition/Lyrics: RYTHEM
  Arrangement: Shin Kouno
3. Love Call (instrumental)
4. Akari no Arika (instrumental)

== Charts and sales ==
Oricon Ranking (Weekly)	Sales
30	4,878
