= TiA =

TiA ティア
- Also known as: Tia; Tomoka Takayama (高山 萌香); Chiaki Hamahime (浜姫 千明)
- Born: November 14, 1987 (age 38); Yokohama, Japan
- Genre: J–Pop
- Occupation: Singer
- Instrument: Vocals
- Years active: 2004–present
- Labels: Sony Music Entertainment Japan (2004-2006); Rainbow Entertainment (2008-2011); Knife Edge/Pony Canyon (2011-)
- Website: www.tiawebsite.com

TiA (ティア) is a Japanese pop singer famous for her songs "Ryuusei" (part of the Naruto ending themes repertoire) and "Every Time". Her August 2005 single "Promise", is used as Yakitate!! Japan's second opening song. She released her first American debut song "I'm On My Way" in 2015.

== Biography ==
TiA was born in Yokohama, Japan. Her father is Japanese and her mother is half German-American and half Japanese.

After sending her demo tapes to several companies, she signed a contract with Epic Records when she was just 16.

TiA debuted at the age of 16 and soon became famous for her song "Ryuusei" which starred as one of the "Naruto" ending themes. Her first album received a Gold Disc Award.

In 2004 she released her first music album, entitled Humming.

In 2014 she moved to New York City, where she currently resides. She has performed at the world-famous Apollo Theater, Carnegie Hall, SOB's, Cafe Wha?, Shrine, Silvana, Milk River, Prudential Center, Newark Symphony Hall, Juneteenth Festival 2016, and McDonald's GospelFest 2016.

She released her most recent single on iTunes in 2017.

== Discography ==
=== Singles ===
- Every Time, released on 2004-06-09
  1. Every Time
  2. Real Love
  3. Every Time (Instrumental)
- Ryuusei (流星, Meteor), released on 2004-08-04
  1. Ryuusei (流星, Meteor)
  2. Missing You
  3. Ryuusei (流星, Meteor) (Instrumental)
- Negai/Birthday Eve (ねがい/バースデーイヴ, Wish/Birthday Eve), released on 2004-11-17
  1. Negai (ねがい, Wish)
  2. Birthday Eve (バースデーイヴ)
  3. Negai (ねがい, Wish) (Instrumental)
  4. Birthday Eve (バースデーイヴ) (Instrumental)
- Promise, released on 2005-08-03
  1. Promise
  2. Taisetsu na Mono (大切なもの, Precious Things)
  3. Promise (Instrumental)
- Zutto Zutto... (ずっと ずっと・・・, Forever and Ever...), released on 2006-03-24
  1. Zutto Zutto... (ずっと ずっと・・・, Forever and Ever...)
  2. Chiisa na Te (ちいさな手, Small Hand)
  3. Zutto Zutto... (ずっと ずっと・・・, Forever and Ever...) (Instrumental)
- With you, released on 2009-01-21 (Digital single)
  1. With you

=== Albums ===
- Humming, released on 2004-12-15
  1. Every Time
  2. Ryuusei (流星, Meteor)
  3. Be Fulfilled
  4. Birthday Eve (バースデーイヴ)
  5. Feel
  6. Missing You
  7. Stanley (スタンリー)
  8. Boku ga Mitsuketa Yume to tomo ni (僕がみつけた夢とともに, With the Dream I Found)
  9. Blue
  10. Blanket
  11. Negai (ねがい, Wish)
- Message, released on 2009-10-28
  1. Dare Yori Kimi Wo Suki De Iru Kara
  2. Closer
  3. Mannar Mode (feat. Ginmaru from Oota Cool)
  4. Aishiteru
  5. My Hero
  6. Future
  7. With You
  8. Home
  9. Kimi No Mikata
  10. Message ~Aitai~
  11. Sapphire ~Satoshi Homura Remix~
- Love Attendant, released on 2012-01-18
  1. 恋するキモチ
  2. 世界で一番キミが大好き。
  3. 100年に一度の愛しています。
  4. Love Attendant～Taking off～
  5. ブランニューデイ with TiA/K.J.
  6. SEPTEMBER
  7. サクラ涙
  8. どうしてもキミじゃなきゃダメなの
  9. さよなら大好きなキミへ
  10. Forever Love
  11. Love Attendant～Thank you for...～

=== Mini-albums ===
- Girl's Soul, released on 2008-06-11
  1. Diamond Road
  2. Sapphire
  3. Girl's Talk
  4. Want You
  5. Woman
  6. Always Yours
  7. Love Is Over

== Awards ==
- McDonald's GospelFest (1st Place in 2016) 1 of 20,000 participants
- Rip The Mic-1st Place 2016
- A Star is Born-1st Place 2016
- Big Poppa Rick Birthday Bash-1st Place 2016
- Apollo Amateur Night-Placed twice in 2015 & 2016
