= Yakitate!! Japan =

Japanese manga series by Takashi Hashiguchi

- First tankōbon volume cover, featuring Kazuma Azuma

焼きたて!! ジャぱん
- Genre: Comedy drama; Cooking
- Manga
- Written by: Takashi Hashiguchi
- Published by: Shogakukan
- English publisher: NA: Viz Media
- Imprint: Shōnen Sunday Comics
- Magazine: Weekly Shōnen Sunday
- Original run: December 26, 2001 – January 10, 2007
- Volumes: 26
- Anime television series
- Directed by: Yasunao Aoki
- Produced by: Norio Yamakawa; Hideyuki Tomioka
- Written by: Katsuyuki Sumisawa
- Music by: Taku Iwasaki
- Studio: Sunrise
- Licensed by: NA: Crunchyroll; SEA: Muse Communication
- Original network: TXN (TV Tokyo)
- English network: SEA: Animax Asia
- Original run: October 12, 2004 – March 14, 2006
- Episodes: 69
- Manga

Yakitate!! Japan Super Real
- Written by: Kenzo Irie
- Illustrated by: Takashi Hashiguchi
- Published by: Shogakukan
- Magazine: Line Manga
- Original run: August 16, 2019 – December 17, 2021
- Volumes: 5
- icon

Yakitate!! Japan (焼きたて!! ジャぱん; 'Freshly Baked!! Ja-pan' (Note: The series title is a pun; "Yakitate" translates to 'freshly baked', and "Ja-pan" combines "Japan" with pan—the Japanese word for "bread", itself a loanword from the Portuguese pão.)) is a Japanese manga series written and illustrated by Takashi Hashiguchi. It was serialized in Shogakukan's shōnen manga magazine Weekly Shōnen Sunday from December 2001 to January 2007, with its chapters collected in 26 tankōbon volumes.

A 69-episode anime television series adaptation by Sunrise was broadcast on TV Tokyo from October 2004 to March 2006. In North America, the manga was licensed in English by Viz Media in 2005 and Nozomi Entertainment licensed the anime series in 2014.

In 2004, Yakitate!! Japan won the 49th Shogakukan Manga Award for the shōnen category.

== Plot ==
Kazuma Azuma is a boy on a quest to create "Ja-pan", a national bread for Japan, as many other countries have their own signature breads. He heads to Tokyo with the intention of working at the famous bread-making chain Pantasia. Along the way, he meets other bakers, both learning from and competing against them. The characters bake their bread using their burning passion and even anger. Besides a desire to create Ja-pan, Azuma also possesses legendary Hands of the Sun (太陽の手, Taiyō no Te): hands that are warmer than typical, prompting dough to ferment faster. While this gives him an advantage early on, his innovation is his greater talent.

== Media ==
=== Manga ===
Written and illustrated by Takashi Hashiguchi, Yakitate!! Japan was serialized in Shogakukan's shōnen manga Weekly Shōnen Sunday from December 26, 2001, to January 10, 2007. (Note: It finished in the magazine's 6th issue of 2007 (cover date January 24), released on January 10 of the same year.) Shogakukan collected its chapters in 26 tankōbon volumes, published from March 18, 2002, to April 18, 2007.

In North America, Viz Media licensed the manga in late 2005. The 26 volumes were released from September 12, 2006, to April 12, 2011.

Another manga series, titled Yakitate!! Japan Super Real (焼きたて！！ジャぱん～超現実～, Yakitate!! Japan Chō Genjitsu), started on the Line Manga app on August 16, 2019. It is written by Kenzo Irie and illustrated by Hashiguchi. Its chapters were collected in five tankōbon volumes, released from April 17, 2020, to December 17, 2021.

==== Yakitate!! Japan ====
No.	Original release date	Original ISBN	English release date	English ISBN
01	March 18, 2002	978-4-09-126391-9	September 12, 2006	978-1-4215-0719-4
02	May 18, 2002	978-4-09-126392-6	November 14, 2006	978-1-4215-0720-0
03	August 9, 2002	978-4-09-126393-3	January 9, 2007	978-1-4215-0721-7
04	October 18, 2002	978-4-09-126394-0	March 13, 2007	978-1-4215-0921-1
05	January 18, 2003	978-4-09-126395-7	May 8, 2007	978-1-4215-0922-8
06	March 18, 2003	978-4-09-126396-4	July 10, 2007	978-1-4215-0923-5
07	May 17, 2003	978-4-09-126397-1	September 11, 2007	978-1-4215-0924-2
08	July 18, 2003	978-4-09-126398-8	November 13, 2007	978-1-4215-0925-9
09	October 18, 2003	978-4-09-126399-5	January 8, 2008	978-1-4215-1457-4
10	December 18, 2003	978-4-09-126400-8	March 11, 2008	978-1-4215-1705-6
11	February 18, 2004	978-4-09-127051-1	May 13, 2008	978-1-4215-1706-3
12	April 17, 2004	978-4-09-127052-8	July 8, 2008	978-1-4215-1707-0
13	July 16, 2004	978-4-09-127053-5	September 9, 2008	978-1-4215-1708-7
14	October 8, 2004	978-4-09-127054-2	November 11, 2008	978-1-4215-1709-4
15	December 17, 2004	978-4-09-127055-9	January 13, 2009	978-1-4215-1710-0
16	February 18, 2005	978-4-09-127056-6	March 10, 2009	978-1-4215-2233-3
17	April 18, 2005	978-4-09-127057-3	May 12, 2009	978-1-4215-2234-0
18	June 16, 2005	978-4-09-127058-0	July 14, 2009	978-1-4215-2235-7
19	September 16, 2005	978-4-09-127059-7	September 8, 2009	978-1-4215-2236-4
20	November 18, 2005	978-4-09-127060-3	November 10, 2009	978-1-4215-2237-1
21	January 14, 2006	978-4-09-120029-7	January 12, 2010	978-1-4215-2903-5
22	April 18, 2006	978-4-09-120329-8	April 13, 2010	978-1-4215-2904-2
23	July 18, 2006	978-4-09-120418-9	July 13, 2010	978-1-4215-2905-9
24	October 18, 2006	978-4-09-120669-5	October 12, 2010	978-1-4215-2906-6
25	January 13, 2007	978-4-09-120826-2	January 11, 2011	978-1-4215-2907-3
26	April 18, 2007	978-4-09-121026-5	April 12, 2011	978-1-4215-2908-0

==== Yakitate!! Japan Super Real ====
No.	Release date	ISBN
1	April 17, 2020	978-4-09-850091-8
2	September 18, 2020	978-4-09-850237-0
3	February 18, 2021	978-4-09-850465-7
4	April 16, 2021	978-4-09-850537-1
5	December 17, 2021	978-4-09-850845-7

=== Anime ===
A 69-episode anime television series adaptation, produced by Sunrise, was broadcast on TV Tokyo from October 12, 2004, to March 14, 2006. Aniplex collected the individual episodes on DVD. The first arc, Pantasia Newcomers Battle arc, was compiled on seven DVDs released from March 25 to September 28, 2005. The second arc, Monaco Cup arc was compiled on six DVDs released from October 26, 2005, to March 29, 2006. The third arc, Yakitate! 9 arc, was released on five DVDs from April 26 to August 23, 2006.

In North America, the series was licensed by Nozomi Entertainment in July 2014. Nozomi released the series on three DVD sets on March 3, May 5, and July 7, 2015. Crunchyroll started streaming the series in November 2015. In July 2019, Funimation announced the streaming rights to the series on its FunimationNow platform. In Southeast Asia, Muse Communication licensed the series and streamed it on its Muse Asia YouTube channel.

=== Music ===
The music from the anime series was composed by Taku Iwasaki. Two original soundtracks albums were released on March 24 and November 23, 2005.

The first opening theme for episodes 1 to 29 is "Houki Gumo" (ホウキ雲) by Rythem. The second opening theme for episodes 30 to 53 is "Promise" by TiA. The third opening theme for episodes 54 to 69 is Chiisana Uta (小さな歌) by Maria.

The first ending theme for episodes 1 to 12 is "Sunday" by The Babystars. The second ending theme for episodes 13 to 29 is "To All Tha Dreamers" by Soul'd Out. The third ending theme for episodes 30 to 42 is "Hummingbird" (ハミングバード) by Little by Little. The fourth ending theme for episodes 43 to 53 is "Re: START" by Surface. The fifth ending theme for episodes 54 to 62 is "Merry Go Round" by Mai Hoshimura. The sixth ending theme for episodes 63 to 68 is "Kokoro Bīdama" (ココロビーダマ). The first opening theme "Houki Gumo" is used as the final ending theme for episode 69.

=== Video games ===
A video game, titled Yakitate!! Japan Gēmu 1-gō Chōjō Kessen!! Pantasic Grand Prix! (焼きたて!!ジャぱん ゲーム1号 頂上決戦!!パンタジック・グランプリ！, Yakitate!! Japan Gēmu 1-gō Chōjō Kessen!! Pantajikku Guran Puri!) "Yakitate!! Japan: Game No. 1 Summit Showdown!! Pantasic Grand Prix!", published by Bandai, was released for the Nintendo DS on January 12, 2006. Characters also appeared in the crossover Shonen Sunday & Shonen Magazine White Comic (少年サンデー&少年マガジン WHITE COMIC), also for Nintendo DS in 2009.

== Reception ==
Along with Fullmetal Alchemist, Yakitate!! Japan won the 49th Shogakukan Manga Award for the shōnen category in 2004.

== See also ==
- Chūka Ichiban! (1995 debut), a cooking manga and anime series
- The God of Cookery (1996), a Stephen Chow cooking film
- Food Wars! Shokugeki no Soma (2012 debut), a cooking manga and anime series
