= Malice =

Malice may refer to:

== Law ==
- Malice (law), a legal term describing the intent to harm

== Places in Poland ==
- Malice, Kuyavian-Pomeranian Voivodeship
- Malice, Lublin Voivodeship
- Malice, Świętokrzyskie Voivodeship

== People and characters ==
=== Persons ===
- Luigi Malice (1937–2026), Italian abstract artist
- Michael Malice (born 1976), author, podcaster, columnist, and media personality
- Malice Green (died 1992), man who died in the custody of Detroit Police after being arrested
- Malice (rapper) (born 1972), stage name of Gene Thornton, half of the hip-hop duo Clipse
- Charly Malice, a ring name of Charly Manson (born 1975), a Mexican professional wrestler
- Jerry Tuite (1966–2003), American professional wrestler also known by the ring name Malice

=== Fictional characters ===
- Malice (Marvel Comics), the name of four different Marvel Comics villains
  - Malice, the Mistress of Hate
  - Malice (Nakia Shauku)
- Malice Vundabar, a DC Comics supervillainess
- Malice, the titular character from the OVA anime Malice@Doll
- Lord Malice, the villain of Army Men: Sarge's War, a video game

== Entertainment ==
=== Film and television ===
- Malice (1926 film), a German silent film
- Malice (1993 film), starring Alec Baldwin, Nicole Kidman and Bill Pullman
- Malice, a 2023 Japanese web series starring Kento Hayashi, Rin Takanashi and Ryuta Sato
- Malice (TV series), a 2025 British psychological thriller TV series
- "Malice" (Stargate Universe), a 2010 episode of Stargate Universe

=== Music ===
- Malice (British band), a UK punk rock group from Crawley, predecessor of The Cure
- Malice (American band), an American heavy metal group
- Malice (rapper), an American rapper
- Malice (Through the Eyes of the Dead album), 2007; album and song
- Malice (Gehenna album), 1996; album and song

=== Literature ===
- Malice, a novel by American romance author Danielle Steel
- Malice, a novel by Japanese author Keigo Higashino (first published as Akui in 1996)
- Malice (novel series), a 2009 young adult novel series by Chris Wooding

=== Video games ===
- Malice (1997 video game), a total conversion for Quake released by Quantum Axcess
- Malice (2004 video game), a video game for PS2 and Xbox developed by Argonaut Games

== Other uses ==
- HMS Malice, a British Royal Navy shiponame, the original intended name of HMS Lochinvar (1915), a Royal Navy destroyer

== See also ==
- Malice in Wonderland (disambiguation)
