= Mugen Factory =

Mugen Factory (夢現ファクトリー)

Studio album by RYTHEM
- Released: May 24, 2006
- Genre: J-Pop
- Producer: Sony Music Japan

RYTHEM chronology
Utatane (2004)	Mugen Factory (夢現ファクトリー) (2006)	23 (2008)

Mugen Factory (夢現ファクトリー, Waking Dream Factory) is the second album from the Japanese duo Rythem. It was released on May 24, 2006 under Sony Music Entertainment Japan. The album contains songs from their 6th up to 10th single.

The item's stock number is AICL-1746.

== Track listing ==
1. "ピカソの休日" (Picasso no Kyuujitsu)
2. "三日月ラプソディー" (Mikazuki Rhapsody)
3. "ホウキ雲" (Houki Gumo)
4. "ココロビーダマ" (Kokoro Bīdama)
5. "名を持つ人へ" (Na wo Motsu Hito e)
6. "Song for you"
7. "月のウサギ" (Tsuki no Usagi)
8. "キセキ" (Kiseki)
9. "願い" (Negai)
10. "車輪の下" (Sharin no Shita)
11. "フラミンゴ" (Flamingo)
12. "気球が虹を越えた日" (Kikyuu ga Niji wo Koeta Hi)
13. "Dear Friend"
14. "20粒のココロ" (20 Tsubu no Kokoro)
