= Princess Princess discography =

- Studio albums: 9
- EPs: 1
- Live albums: 2
- Compilation albums: 12
- Singles: 21
- Video albums: 14 (Note: This includes the music video compilation albums and concert DVDs.)
- Box sets: 3
- Tribute albums: 1

The discography of the Japanese band Princess Princess consists of nine studio albums, twelve compilation albums, and twenty one singles released since 1986.

== Albums ==
=== Studio albums ===
Title	Album details	Peak chart positions	Certifications	Sales
Title	Album details	JPN Oricon	Certifications	Sales
Teleportation	Released: May 21, 1987; Label: CBS Sony; Formats: LP, CD, cassette	38		JPN: 71,000
Here We Are	Released: February 26, 1988; Label: CBS Sony; Formats: LP, CD, cassette	8	RIAJ: Platinum	JPN: 414,000
Let's Get Crazy	Released: November 21, 1988; Label: CBS Sony; Formats: LP, CD, cassette	2	RIAJ: Platinum	JPN:621,000
Lovers	Released: November 17, 1989; Label: CBS Sony; Formats: CD, cassette	1	RIAJ: 4× Platinum	JPN: 1,273,000
Princess Princess	Released: December 21, 1990; Label: CBS Sony; Formats: CD, cassette	1	RIAJ: 3× Platinum	JPN: 1,372,000
Dolls in Action	Released: December 7, 1991; Label: Sony Records; Formats: CD, cassette	1	RIAJ 2× Platinum	JPN: 95,000
Bee-Beep	Released: January 21, 1993; Label: Sony Records; Formats: CD, cassette	1	RIAJ: Platinum	JPN: 552,000
Majestic	Released: December 22, 1993; Label: Sony Records; Formats: CD, cassette	2	RIAJ: Gold	JPN: 243,000
The Last Princess	Released: December 13, 1995; Label: Sony Records; Formats: CD, cassette	10		JPN: 169,000

=== Extended plays ===
Title	Album details	Peak chart positions	Sales
Title	Album details	JPN Oricon	Sales
Kiss de Crime	Released: May 21, 1986; Label: CBS Sony; Formats: EP, cassette, CD	48	JPN: 7,000

=== Live albums ===
Title	Album details	Peak chart positions	Sales
Title	Album details	Oricon	Sales
The Last Live	Released: December 1, 1996; Label: Sony Records; Formats: CD, cassette	26	JPN: 39,000
Very Best of Princess Princess Tour 2012: Saikai at Budokan	Released: March 27, 2013; Label: SME Records; Formats: CD	36	
PRINCESS PRINCESS TOUR 2012 ～Saikai～ “The Last Princess” @ Tokyo Dome	Released: Jun 2, 2024; Label: Sony Music Labels; Formats: Digital download	―	

=== Compilations ===
Title	Album details	Peak chart positions	Certifications	Sales
Title	Album details	Oricon	Certifications	Sales
Singles 1987–1992	Released: July 15, 1992; Label: Sony Records; Formats: CD, cassette	1	RIAJ: 4× Platinum	JPN: 1,339,000
Presents	Released: August 24, 1995; Label: Sony Records; Formats: CD, cassette	3	RIAJ: Gold	JPN: 195,000
The Greatest Princess	Released: February 1, 1996; Label: Sony Records; Formats: CD, cassette	3	RIAJ: Platinum	JPN: 313,000
Star Box: Princess Princess	Released: January 30, 1999; Label: Sony Records; Formats: CD	—		JPN: 44,000
Star Box Extra: Princess Princess	Released: December 5, 2001; Label: SME Records; Formats: CD	—		
Puri 2: Princess Princess Best of Best	Released: March 8, 2006; Label: SME Records; Formats: CD	47		JPN: 10,000
Summer Songs!	Released: July 18, 2007; Label: SME Records; Formats: CD	—		
Winter Songs!	Released: November 21, 2007; Label: SME Records; Formats: CD	—		
The Premium Best	Released: July 2, 2008; Label: SME Records; Formats: CD	40		
Best of Best: Princess Princess	Released: November 20, 2009; Label: SME Records; Formats: CD	—		
Super Best: Princess Princess	Released: November 20, 2009; Label: SME Records; Formats: CD	—		
The Rebirth Best: Saikai	Released: June 27, 2012; Label: SME Records; Formats: CD	5		
"—" denotes a recording that did not chart or was not released in that territory.

=== Box sets ===
Title	Album details	Peak chart positions
Title	Album details	Oricon
The Complete Songs of Princess Princess	Released: June 1, 1996; Label: Sony Records; Formats: CD	19
10 Years After: Princess Princess Premium Box	Released: March 8, 2006; Label: SME Records; Formats: CD	182
21st: Princess Princess Single Collection Memorial Box	Released: May 31, 2006; Label: SME Records; Formats: CD	—
"—" denotes a recording that did not chart or was not released in that territory.

=== Tribute albums ===
Title	Album details
14 Princess: Princess Princess Children	Released: March 8, 2006; Label: SME Records; Formats: CD

== Singles ==
List of singles, with selected chart positions
Title	Year	Peak chart positions	Certifications	Sales	Album
Title	Year	JPN Oricon	Certifications	Sales	Album
"Koi wa Balance"	1987	—			Teleportation
"Sekai de Ichiban Atsui Natsu"	1987	—			Singles 1987–1992
"My Will"	1987	75		JPN: 16,000	Here We Are
"19 Growing Up -Ode to My Buddy-"	1988	62		JPN: 16,000	Here We Are
"Go Away Boy"	1988	19		JPN: 47,000	Here We Are
"Get Crazy!"	1988	13		JPN: 119,000	Let's Get Crazy
"Diamonds"	1989	1	RIAJ: 3× Platinum	JPN: 1,097,000	Singles 1987–1992
"Sekai de Ichiban Atsui Natsu" (Original version)	1989	1	RIAJ: 2× Platinum	JPN: 865,000	Singles 1987–1992
"Oh Yeah!"	1990	1	RIAJ: Platinum	JPN: 575,000	Singles 1987–1992
"Julian"	1990	1	RIAJ: Platinum	JPN: 588,000	Princess Princess
"Kiss"	1991	1	RIAJ: Platinum	JPN: 401,000	Singles 1987–1992
"Seven Years After"	1991	3	RIAJ: Gold	JPN: 281,000	Dolls in Action
"Jungle Princess"	1992	13		JPN: 134,000	Dolls in Action
"Pilot ni Naritakute"	1992	6		JPN: 123,000	Singles 1987–1992
"Power/Regret"	1992	7	RIAJ: Gold	JPN: 114,000	Bee-Beep
"Dakara Honey"	1993	6	RIAJ: Platinum	JPN: 186,000	The Complete Songs of Princess Princess
"Futari ga Owaru Toki"	1993	18		JPN: 73,000	Majestic
"The Summer Vacation"	1994	21		JPN: 81,000	Presents
"Birthday Song"	1995	23		JPN: 72,000	Non-album single
"Fly Baby Fly"	1995	28		JPN: 32,000	The Last Princess
"Natsu no Owari"	1996	27		JPN: 34,000	Non-album single
"—" denotes a recording that did not chart or was not released in that territory.

== Videography ==
=== Music video albums ===
List of media, with selected chart positions
Title	Album details
Video Clips	Released: July 21, 1989; Label: CBS Sony; Formats: LD, VHS
Video Clips 2	Released: March 21, 1991; Label: Sony Records; Formats: LD, VHS
Dolls in Las Vegas	Released: March 1, 1992; Label: Sony Records; Formats: LD, VHS
Video Singles 1987–1992	Released: October 21, 1992; Label: Sony Records; Formats: LD, VHS
Video Clips 3	Released: February 21, 1994; Label: Sony Records; Formats: LD, VHS
The Platinum Days 1: The Greatest Princess	Released: February 1, 1996; Label: Sony Records; Formats: LD, VHS
The Platinum Days 2: The Greatest Princess	Released: June 8, 1996; Label: Sony Records; Formats: LD, VHS

=== Live video albums ===
List of media, with selected chart positions
Title	Year	Peak positions	
Title	Year	JPN DVD	JPN Blu-ray
Princess Princess Panic Tour: Here We Are	Released: August 1, 1988; Label: CBS Sony; Formats: LD, VHS	—	—
Let's Get Crazy: Live at Budokan	Released: December 24, 1989; Label: CBS Sony; Formats: LD, VHS	—	—
Shichijitsugōken at Budokan 1994	Released: June 22, 1994; Label: Sony Records; Formats: LD, VHS	—	—
The Last Live	Released: August 21, 1996; Label: Sony Records; Formats: LD, VHS	—	—
Princess Princess Tour 2012: Saikai at Budokan	Released: March 27, 2013; Label: SME Records; Formats: DVD, BD	18	14
Princess Princess Tour 2012: Saikai "The Last Princess" at Tokyo Dome	Released: December 25, 2013; Label: SME Records; Formats: DVD, Blu-ray	45	42
Princess Princess Tour 2012–2016: Saikai -For Ever- "Goya-sai" at Toyosu Pit	Released: March 8, 2017; Label: SME Records; Formats: DVD, BD	14	14
"—" denotes a recording that did not chart or was not released in that territory.

=== Video box sets ===
List of media, with selected chart positions
Title	Year	Peak positions	
Title	Year	JPN DVD	JPN Blu-ray
PRINCESS PRINCESS THE BOX -The Platinum Days-	Released: Oct 25, 2006; Label: SME Records; Formats: 9DVD	—	—
DIAMONDS STORY	Released: March 22, 2023; Label: SME Records; Formats: 12BD (Type-A), 11BD (Type-B)	—	16
Diamonds Story: NHK Premium Box	Released: March 20, 2024; Label: SME Records; Formats: 4BD	—	20

== Akasaka Komachi discography ==
On February 20, 1983, the members of what would later become Princess Princess first formed as Akasaka Komachi (赤坂小町) after passing auditions hosted by TDK Records. They named themselves after Akasaka, Tokyo, the location of TDK's headquarters. Akasaka Komachi's catchphrase was "Tenkei-teki Gendai Mesukōsei-fū Gakudan" (典型的現代女子高生風楽団; lit. "Typical Modern High School Girl Wind Orchestra"). Shortly after the release of their debut EP Koala Boy Kockey (コアラボーイ・コッキィ, Koara Bōi Kokkī) in 1984 (for the TV Tokyo anime series of the same name), the band changed its name to Julian Mama (ジュリアンママ, Jurian Mama) before finally settling with Princess Princess in 1986.

=== Extended plays ===
Title	Album
Koala Boy Kockey	Released: November 1984; Label: TDK Records; Formats: EP

=== Compilation albums ===
Title	Album details
Akasaka Komachi	Released: March 25, 1996; Label: TDK Records; Formats: CD

=== Singles ===
List of singles, with selected chart positions
Title	Year	Album
"Hōkago Jugyō"	1984	Non-album single
"Hito Natsu no Scandal"	1984	Non-album single
"Koala Boy Kockey"	1984	Koala Boy Kockey

== See also ==
- List of best-selling music artists in Japan
