= The Last Live (Princess Princess album) =

1996 live video album by Princess Princess

Video by Princess Princess
- Released: August 21, 1996
- Recorded: May 31, 1996
- Venue: Nippon Budokan
- Genres: J-pop; rock
- Language: Japanese
- Label: Sony Records
- Producer: Princess Princess

Princess Princess chronology
The Platinum Days 2: The Greatest Princess (1996)	The Last Live (1996)	Princess Princess Tour 2012: Saikai at Budokan (2013)

The Last Live (ザ・ラスト・ライヴ, Za Rasuto Raivu) is a live video album by the Japanese girl band Princess Princess, released on August 21, 1996, by Sony Records. It was recorded on May 31, 1996, at Nippon Budokan on the band's final concert before their disbandment.

== Track listing ==
All music is composed by Kaori Okui, except where indicated; all music is arranged by Princess Princess.

No.	Title	Lyrics	Music	Length
1.	"Seven Years After"	Kyōko Tomita
2.	"Oh Yeah!"	Kanako Nakayama
3.	"Go Away Boy"	Nakayama
4.	"Sekai de Ichiban Atsui Natsu" ((世界でいちばん熱い夏; "The Hottest Summer in the World"))	Tomita
5.	"Julian" (Jurian (ジュリアン))	Nakayama
6.	"Princess Princess Medley"
7.	"M"	Tomita
8.	"Romancin' Blue"	Tomita
9.	"Girls' Night" (Gāruzu Naito (ガールズ・ナイト))	Nakayama
10.	"Rock Me"	Okui
11.	"Guitar Man"	Okui
12.	"Hetchara" ((へっちゃら; "Hey"))	Okui	Nakayama
13.	"Pilot ni Naritakute" (Pairotto ni Naritakute (パイロットになりたくて; "I Want to Be a Pilot"))	Nakayama	Konno
14.	"Fly Baby Fly"	Tomita
15.	"Get Crazy!"	Nakayama
16.	"Diamonds" (Daiamondo (ダイアモンド))	Nakayama
17.	"19 Growing Up (Ode to My Buddy)"	Tomita

Princess Princess Medley
No.	Title	Lyrics	Music	Length
1.	"Tokyo Kanojo" ((TOKYO彼女; "Tokyo Girlfriend"))	Okui; Nakayama; Atsuko Watanabe; Tomoko Konno; Tomita	Abe Ōji
2.	"Koi wa Balance" (Koi wa Baransu (恋はバランス; "Love Is a Balance"))	Tomita	Kisaburō Suzuki
3.	"My Will"	Konno
4.	"Wonder Castle"	Konno
5.	"She"	Nakayama	Konno
6.	"Stay There"	Tomita
7.	"Tomodachi no Mama" ((友達のまま; "Remaining as a Friend"))	Tomita
8.	"One"	Tomita
9.	"Highway Star"	Watanabe	Watanabe; Okui
10.	"Kiss"	Tomita; Nakayama	Nakayama
11.	"Jungle Princess" (Janguru Purinsesu (ジャングルプリンセス))	Konno	Nakayama
12.	"Dakara Honey" (Dakara Hanī (だからハニー; "So Honey"))	Nakayama
13.	"Melody Melody"	Tomita
14.	"Bee-Beep (Puri-Puri Summit)" (Bī Bīpu Puri-Puri Samitto (BEE-BEEP プリプリ サミット))	Okui; Nakayama; Watanabe; Konno; Tomita	Nakayama
15.	"Kizuato" ((傷跡; "Scar"))	Nakayama
16.	"Bye Bye"	Nakayama
17.	"Seishun Daydream" (Seishun Deidorīmu (青春デイドリーム; "Youth Daydream"))	Tomita	Konno
18.	"Natsu no Owari" ((夏の終わり; "The End of Summer"))	Watanabe	Watanabe
19.	"Aibō (Budokan 5.31 Version)" ((相棒（武道館5.31バージョン）; "Partner (Budokan 5.31 Version)"))	Nakayama

== CD version ==
The Last Live

Live album by Princess Princess
- Released: December 1, 1996
- Recorded: May 31, 1996
- Venue: Nippon Budokan
- Genres: J-pop; rock
- Length: 97:39
- Language: Japanese
- Label: Sony Records
- Producer: Princess Princess

Princess Princess chronology
The Complete Songs of Princess Princess (1996)	The Last Live (1996)	Star Box: Princess Princess (1999)

The audio recording of the concert was released on CD on December 1, 1996. It peaked at No. 26 on Oricon's albums chart.

=== Track listing ===
All music is composed by Kaori Okui, except where indicated; all music is arranged by Princess Princess.

Disc 1
No.	Title	Lyrics	Length
1.	"Seven Years After"	Tomita	4:46
2.	"Oh Yeah!"	Nakayama	3:55
3.	"Go Away Boy"	Nakayama	4:11
4.	"Sekai de Ichiban Atsui Natsu"	Tomita	3:50
5.	"Julian"	Nakayama	5:35
6.	"Princess Princess Medley"		21:15

Disc 2
No.	Title	Lyrics	Music	Length
1.	"M"	Tomita		4:50
2.	"Romancin' Blue"	Tomita		5:08
3.	"Girls' Night"	Nakayama		4:53
4.	"Rock Me"	Okui		4:00
5.	"Guitar Man"	Okui		4:56
6.	"Hetchara"	Okui	Nakayama	1:47
7.	"Pilot ni Naritakute"	Nakayama	Konno	4:21
8.	"Fly Baby Fly"	Tomita		7:16
9.	"Get Crazy!"	Nakayama		4:39
10.	"Diamonds"	Nakayama		7:50
11.	"19 Growing Up (Ode to My Buddy)"	Tomita		4:27

== Charts ==
Chart (1996)	Peak position
Japanese Albums (Oricon)	26
