= Princess Princess Tour 2012: Saikai at Budokan =

Live video album by Princess Princess

Video by Princess Princess
- Released: March 27, 2013
- Recorded: November 23, 2012
- Venue: Nippon Budokan
- Genres: J-pop; rock
- Language: Japanese
- Label: SME Records
- Producer: Princess Princess

Princess Princess chronology
The Last Live (1996)	Princess Princess Tour 2012: Saikai at Budokan (2013)	Princess Princess Tour 2012: Saikai "The Last Princess" at Tokyo Dome (2013)

Princess Princess Tour 2012: Saikai at Budokan (PRINCESS PRINCESS TOUR 2012～再会～at 武道館) is a live video album by the Japanese girl band Princess Princess, released on March 27, 2013, by SME Records on DVD and Blu-ray, and CD. It was recorded on November 23, 2012, at Nippon Budokan during the band's reunion tour, with proceeds of the album's sales going to the reconstruction of Japan after the 2011 Tōhoku earthquake and tsunami.

The video peaked at No. 18 on Oricon's DVD chart and No. 14 on Oricon's Blu-ray chart.

== Track listing ==
All music is composed by Kaori Kishitani, except where indicated; all music is arranged by Princess Princess.

Disc 1
No.	Title	Lyrics	Music	Length
1.	"Intro"
2.	"Fly Baby Fly"	Kyōko Tomita
3.	"Oh Yeah!"	Kanako Nakayama
4.	"Sekai de Ichiban Atsui Natsu" ((世界でいちばん熱い夏; "The Hottest Summer in the World"))	Tomita
5.	"Go Away Boy"	Nakayama
6.	"Julian" (Jurian (ジュリアン))	Nakayama
7.	"MC1"
8.	"Wonder Castle"	Tomoko Konno
9.	"Kiss"	Tomita; Nakayama	Nakayama
10.	"Stay There"	Tomita
11.	"Romancin' Blue"	Tomita
12.	"MC2"
13.	"Papa" ((パパ))	Nakayama
14.	"Moonlight Story" (Mūnraito Sutōrī (ムーンライト ストーリー))	Nakayama
15.	"MC3"
16.	"M"	Tomita
17.	"One"	Tomita
18.	"Seven Years After"	Tomita
19.	"MC4"
20.	"Get Crazy!"	Nakayama
21.	"Rock Me"	Kishitani
22.	"Bee-Beep (Puri-Puri Summit)" (Bī Bīpu Puri-Puri Samitto (BEE-BEEP プリプリ サミット))	Kishitani; Nakayama; Atsuko Watanabe; Konno; Tomita	Nakayama
23.	"Hetchara" ((へっちゃら; "Hey"))	Kishitani	Nakayama
24.	"Pilot ni Naritakute" (Pairotto ni Naritakute (パイロットになりたくて; "I Want to Be a Pilot"))	Nakayama	Konno
25.	"Guitar Man"	Kishitani
26.	"MC5"
27.	"Diamonds" (Daiamondo (ダイアモンド))	Nakayama
28.	"I Love You"	Nakayama
29.	"Ding Dong"	Nakayama
30.	"Highway Star"	Watanabe	Watanabe; Kishitani
31.	"19 Growing Up (Ode to My Buddy)"	Tomita

Disc 2
No.	Title	Length
1.	"Story of Princess Princess"

== CD version ==
Very Best of Princess Princess Tour 2012: Saikai at Budokan

Live album by Princess Princess
- Released: March 27, 2013
- Recorded: November 23, 2012
- Venue: Nippon Budokan
- Genres: J-pop; rock
- Length: 58:08
- Language: Japanese
- Label: SME Records
- Producer: Princess Princess

Princess Princess chronology
The Rebirth Best: Saikai (2012)	Very Best of Princess Princess Tour 2012: Saikai at Budokan (2013)

An abridged version of the concert was released on CD as Very Best of Princess Princess Tour 2012: Saikai at Budokan (VERY BEST OF PRINCESS PRINCESS TOUR 2012～再会～at 武道館). It peaked at No. 36 on Oricon's albums chart.

=== Track listing ===
All music is composed by Kaori Kishitani, except where indicated; all music is arranged by Princess Princess.

No.	Title	Lyrics	Music	Length
1.	"Fly Baby Fly"	Tomita		3:40
2.	"Sekai de Ichiban Atsui Natsu"	Tomita		3:53
3.	"Stay There"	Tomita		4:30
4.	"Papa"	Nakayama		5:15
5.	"M"	Tomita		4:33
6.	"One"	Tomita		4:27
7.	"Seven Years After"	Tomita		4:37
8.	"Get Crazy!"	Nakayama		4:57
9.	"Rock Me"	Kishitani		4:06
10.	"Diamonds"	Nakayama		5:09
11.	"Ding Dong"	Nakayama		3:45
12.	"Highway Star"	Watanabe	Watanabe; Kishitani	4:52
13.	"19 Growing Up (Ode to My Buddy)"	Tomita		4:24
Total length:				58:08

== Charts ==
Chart (2013)	Peak position
Japanese DVD Sales (Oricon)	18
Blu-ray Sales (Oricon)	14
Japanese Albums (Oricon)	36
