= The Greatest Princess =

Compilation album by Princess Princess
- Released: February 1, 1996
- Recorded: 1987–1995
- Genres: J-pop; rock
- Length: 76:00
- Language: Japanese
- Label: Sony Records
- Producer: Princess Princess

Princess Princess chronology
The Last Princess (1995)	The Greatest Princess (1996)	The Complete Songs of Princess Princess (1996)

The Greatest Princess (ザ・グレイテスト・プリンセス, Za Gureitesuto Purinsesu) is the third compilation album by the Japanese girl band Princess Princess, released on February 1, 1996, by Sony Records during the band's farewell tour. The album compiles the band's singles and select tracks from 1987 to 1995.

The album peaked at No. 3 on Oricon's albums chart. It was also certified Platinum by the RIAJ.

== Track listing ==
All music is composed by Kaori Okui, except where indicated; all music is arranged by Princess Princess and Masanori Sasaji.

No.	Title	Lyrics	Music	Length
1.	"19 Growing Up -Ode to My Buddy-"	Kyōko Tomita		4:17
2.	"Go Away Boy"	Kanako Nakayama	Nakayama	4:12
3.	"Get Crazy!"	Nakayama		4:37
4.	"M"	Tomita		4:35
5.	"Diamonds" (Daiamondo (ダイアモンド))	Nakayama		4:59
6.	"Sekai de Ichiban Atsui Natsu (Heisei Recording)" ((世界でいちばん熱い夏 (平成レコーディング）; "The Hottest Summer in the World (Heisei Version)"))	Tomita		4:13
7.	"Tomodachi no Mama" ((友達のまま; "Remaining as a Friend"))	Tomita		5:02
8.	"Parade Shiyō yo" (Parēdo Shiyō yo (パレードしようよ; "Let's Parade"))	Tomita		3:28
9.	"Oh Yeah!"	Nakayama		4:09
10.	"Julian" (Jurian (ジュリアン))	Nakayama		5:09
11.	"Rock Me"	Okui		4:07
12.	"Highway Star"	Atsuko Watanabe	Watanabe; Okui	4:52
13.	"Kiss"	Tomita; Nakayama	Nakayama	4:30
14.	"Seven Years After"	Tomita		4:44
15.	"Pilot ni Naritakute" (Pairotto ni Naritakute (パイロットになりたくて; "I Want to Be a Pilot"))	Nakayama	Tomoko Konno	4:24
16.	"Guitar Man"	Okui		4:53
17.	"Fly Baby Fly"	Tomita		3:47
Total length:				76:00

== Charts ==
Chart (1996)	Peak position
Japanese Albums (Oricon)	3

== Certification ==
Region	Certification	Certified units/sales
Japan (RIAJ)	Platinum	400,000^{^}
^{^} Shipments figures based on certification alone.
