= Ai Shinozaki =

Japanese model and actress (born 1992)

- 篠崎 愛
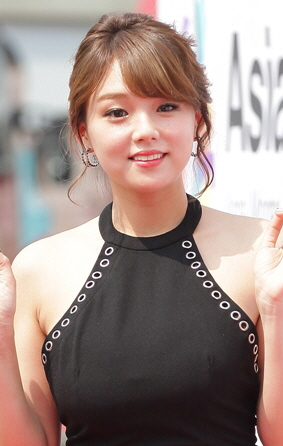
- Shinozaki at the 2017 Asia Model Festival
- Born: February 26, 1992 (age 34); Tokyo, Japan
- Other name: Ai-chan
- Occupations: Model; actress
- Years active: 2006–present
- Height: 1.60 m (5 ft 3 in)
- Website: shinozakiai0226.com

Ai Shinozaki (篠崎 愛, Shinozaki Ai; born February 26, 1992) is a Japanese gravure model, actress, and former idol singer member of AeLL., a musical idol group.

When she started modelling in 2006 at age 14, Shinozaki caused widespread press and web comments about her having an unusually curvy figure for a Japanese teenager. In 2007, her official height and figure measurements were first listed on the Chu → Boh website as "T158 B85 W60 H87" (5 ft 2 in, 33-24-34). By 2012, her measurements were updated to "T160 B87 W60 H88" (5 ft 3 in, 34-24-35) and have remained her official measurements since, though her bust measurement has been known to fluctuate throughout the years. She regularly appears on the front page of popular titles, such as Young Champion Retsu, Young Animal, and Weekly Young Jump.

Aside from modelling, she has gone on to forge a career as a pop idol. She has released five singles and three albums throughout her solo singing career.

== Career ==
In July 2006, when Shinozaki was in her third year of middle school, she debuted as a leading idol at Chu → Boh, a gravure magazine specializing in female junior idols in middle school aimed towards male readers, published by Haewangsa. In 2007, she moved to Koh → Boh, a gravure magazine specializing in female junior idols in high school, a sister magazine of Chu → Boh. She debuted as an actress in October 2007, appearing in the drama "24 Eyes" (TBS series).

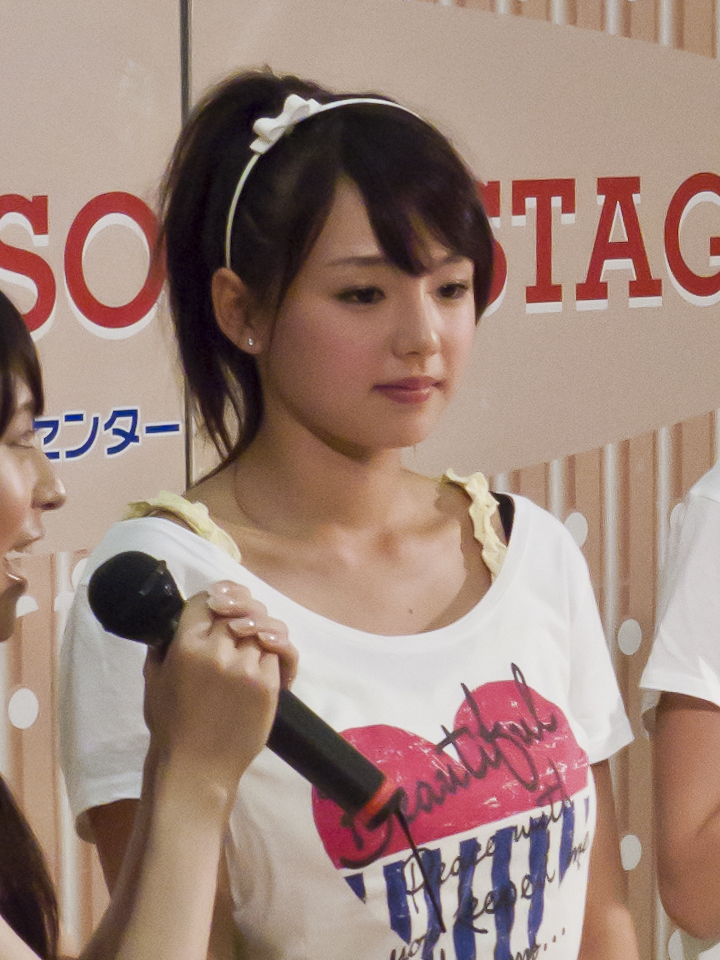
Shinozaki with her fellow members of AeLL. in 2011

She made her debut as a singer in 2008 with her cover of "M". In January 2011, Shinozaki formed the idol group AeLL (Activity Eco Life with Love) with Shijou Haruna, Takana Kumi, and Nishi Erika. They held their debut event at Tower Records Shinjuku, Tokyo on April 29, 2011. The group released six albums and two singles but decided to take an indefinite hiatus in 2014. In 2015, she made a comeback as a solo artist with the single 'A-G-A-I-N'.

After releasing her photobook Kesshou in November 2017, Shinozaki decided to take an indefinite hiatus with her gravure modelling career. This would last four years, ending with her return on the cover of the September 24 issue of Friday Magazine in 2021.

== Media ==
(excluding the acts of AeLL.)

=== Singles ===
- "M" (2008, March 26, FOR-SIDE RECORDS) cover of Princess Princess's song
- "A-G-A-I-N" (2015-04-29) Reached 31st place on Oricon's Weekly Singles Chart
- "口の悪い女" (August 24, 2016) Reached 22nd place on Oricon's Weekly Singles Chart
- "TRUE LOVE" (December 7, 2016) Reached 23rd on Oricon's Weekly Singles Chart
- "Floatin’Like The Moon(初回生産限定盤)" (September 6, 2017) Reached 25th on Oricon's Weekly Singles Chart

=== Music albums ===
- "EAT ’EM AND SMILE" (December 9, 2015) Reached 23rd on Oricon's Weekly Albums Chart
- "LOVE/HATE" (March 22, 2017) Reached 36th on Oricon's Weekly Albums Chart
- "YOU & LOVE" (April 25, 2018) Reached 29th on Oricon's Weekly Albums Chart

=== Photo albums ===
- START DUSH!! (July 2006, Saibunkan) ISBN 4-7756-0134-2 Photo by Mitsuhiro Mouri
- Bon! Bon! Ai-bomb (December 2007, BUNKASHA) ISBN 978-4-8211-2688-0 Photo by Ryuuzi Maemura
- Milk-colored love (May 2008, Aquahouse Inc) ISBN 978-4-86046-114-0 Photo by Takayuki Kozuka
- Okkina Love (May 12, 2008, Gakken Publishing) ISBN 978-4-05-403784-7 Photo by Shouta Iizuka
- Renai ~Love~ (April 2009, Saibunkan) ISBN 978-4-7756-0388-8 Photo by Sei Kimura
- Heartiness (Sabra DVD Mook) (November 2009, Shogakukan) ISBN 978-4-0910-3080-1 Photo by Akihito Saijo
- Sakura Saku Toki (May 2010, Saibunkan Publishing Co, Ltd) ISBN 978-4-7756-0479-3 Photo by Koji Inomoto
- Love Scenes: Ai Shinozaki (September 2014, Shogakukan) ISBN 978-4-0968-2096-4 Photo by Akihito Saijo
- Kesshou (November 1, 2017, Kodansha) ISBN 978-4063528640 Photo by Akihito Nishikasa
- Ai Shinozaki Photobook: Young Champion Magazine 10 years Memory (November 2010, Akita Shoten) ISBN 978-4-253-01099-3
- IDEA (February 22, 2022, Kodansha) ISBN 978-4-0652-7160-5
- fuyu-hada [Digital Limited] (September 26, 2022, Shueisha) Photo by Yasutomo SAMPEI
- Ai Shinozaki Calendar Book 2023 (November 2, 2022, Shueisha) ISBN 978-4-0890-8446-5 Photo by Yasutomo SAMPEI
- Ai Shinozaki Photobook: Young Champion Magazine 15 years Memory (March 14, 2023, Akita Shoten) ISBN 978-4-253-01120-4

=== Magazines ===
- FRIDAY (Kodansha)
- Young Champion Retsu (Shueisha)
- Weekly Young Jump (Shueisha)
- Playboy (Shueisha)
- Chu Boh (Neptune's)
- Scholastic (Scholastic Inc.)
- Yul Young Champion (Akita Shoten)
- Sex Bomb (Publishing Gakken)
- i love you (Amit)

=== DVD ===
- "Shinozaki Ai" (August 25, 2006, Saibunkan) [SBKD-0003]
- "Love LOVE YOU" (September 27, 2006, TRAFFIC) [TJCB-10009]
- "Peach Pie Love" (November 22, 2006, Air Control) [KQT-081]
- "Pure Smile" (February 23, 2007 Takeshobo) [TSDV-41110]
- "From the island of Ai ..." (Sun May 25, 2007, GP Museum Soft) [DMSM-7169]
- "F-MATES, 15-MATES" (July 20, 2007, Spice Visual) ※ with Ueno Tihiro [MMR-040]
- "LOVE-chan" (August 24, 2007, Takeshobo) [TSDV-41142]
- "Balloooooon" (November 30, 2007, BUNKASHA) [BKDV-00260]
- "ONE" (February 22, 2008, Spice Visual) [MMR-048]
- "Milk-colored love" (May 23, 2008, Spice Visual) [MMA-050]
- "Ai-Link" (August 22, 2008, Frontier Inetto) [FOEN-031]
- "Okkina Love" (December 17, 2008, Gakken publishing) [SSBX-2244]
- "Lots of love ~ Ai Ippai"(February 20, 2009, Rainkomyunikeshonzu) [LCDV-40359]
- "Love's zephyr ~ Koi Kaze" (February 20, 2009, Rainkomyunikeshonzu) [LCDV-40360]
- "'Love' I'm trying hard! ~ Ai Ganbattemasu!" (May 22, 2009, Saibunkan) [SBVD-0036]
- "Lady ~ Frau" (August 28, 2009, Takeshobo) [TSDV-41241]
- "Soeur ~ Sister" (August 28, 2009, Takeshobo) [TSDV-41242]
- "Hokkaido promise long-distance love" (November 27, 2009, Frontier Inetto) [ENFD-5176]
- "Sunny ..." (November 27, 2009, Frontier Inetto) [ENFD-5177]
- "Shinozaki Ai Kakeroma Island Beach Angels in Amami Oshima" (February 24, 2010, bop) [VPXF-75112] Blu-ray Disc * version released simultaneously
- "Sakukoro cherry" (May 28, 2010, Saibunkan) [SBVD-0075]
- "Baito naka!? ~ Doing Part-Time!?" (August 27, 2010, Takeshobo) [TSDV-41292]
- "Rabusupo! ~ Love Sport!" (August 27, 2010, Takeshobo) [TSDV-41293]
- "Mountain Girl Moe Tsu loose ..." (September 15, 2010, Pony Canyon)
- "Shinozaki Ai FINAL 1/2 ~ Wonderland Love" (November 20, 2010, Rainkomyunikeshonzu) [LCDV-40443]
- "Shinozaki Ai FINAL 2/2 ~ Loveland Love" (November 20, 2010, Rainkomyunikeshonzu) [LCDV-40444]
- "Shinozaki Ai Special DVD-BOX" (November 20, 2010, Rainkomyunikeshonzu)
- "Shinozaki Ai Premium DVD BOX" (February 25, 2011, Grasso)
- "Junai Ijou" (April 27, 2011, Inet Frontier) [ENFD-5301]
- "Junjou Kalen" (April 27, 2011, Inet Frontier) [ENFD-5302]
- "Koi nandesu" (July 28, 2011, Ribapūru) [YJLP-1006]. First market-release was December 22, 2011 then Blu-ray Disc version for April 18, 2014
- "Amai Kajitsu ~ Sweet Fruit" (September 24, 2011, bamboo study) [TSDV-41376]
- "Magical Eyes" (2011, September 24, 2011, bamboo study) [TSDV-41377]
- "Love Overflowing! ~ Ai Afuretemasu!" (December 23, 2011, Oh, of digital su Tatari Hikaru) [SBVD-0130]
- "Sweet Love" (February 22, 2012) (BOMB-1018]
- "Ai no mama ni... ~ Leave the Love..." (May 23, 2012, Ribapūru) [LPDD-72]. Blu-ray Disc version release at November 22, 2013
- "Ai Motion" . . . " (June 22, 2012, Ribapūru) [LPFD-247]
- "Ai's Origin" (September 20, 2013, shining-will) [DV-01]
- "Your Ai's Only" (March 20, 2014, shining-will) [DV-06]
- "篠崎愛 Lovely" (October 17, 2014, shining-will) [DV-09]
- "HOLIDAY" (May 29, 2015, shining-will) [DV-10]
- "Reality"（October 8, 2015, shining-will）[DV-12]

== Filmography ==
(excluding the acts of AeLL.)

=== Movie ===
- Pantsu no Ana (2011), Narumi Ichinose
- Kotsutsubo (2012), Kaho Saeki
- Time Slip Glasses (2013), Tōko Hashida
- Alps a Girls High School (2014), Eri Onozuka
- Tokyo Darkness Insect: 2nd scenario: Pandora (2015), Yui Onizuka

=== TV variety ===
- "2008! Choice Idol Mania! Always break Idol" (28 December 2007, NTV)
- "Girls On Film" (Mondo21, 2007)
- "Beach Angels" (TBS Channel, 2009)
- "Mountain Girl Moe Tsu loose!" (29 July 2010, Kansai)

=== TV drama ===
- Twenty-Four Eyes (October 2007 to March 2008, TBS TV)

=== Stage ===
- "MOTHER Mother – The story of a mother bird Hama Tome suicide" (9 December 2009 – 13 June 2010, New National Theater Small Theater)
- "MOTHER Mother – The story of a mother bird suicide Tome Hama ~" [replay] (26 May to 30 May 2010, Galaxy Theatre Tennozu)
- "Entertainment Alley" produced "a good day, restructuring" (18 August to 22 August 2010, Theater Green)

== See also ==
- List of Japanese gravure idols
