= Changhuan =

1985 album by Teresa Teng

Studio album by Teresa Teng
- Released: August 19, 1985
- Recorded: 1985
- Genre: Mandopop
- Length: 48:30
- Language: Mandarin
- Label: Polydor; Kolin Records

Teresa Teng chronology
Messengers of Love (1984)	Changhuan (1985)	I Only Care About You (1987)

Singles from Changhuan
- 1. "Changhuan" Released: August 19, 1985

Changhuan (Chinese: 償還), is a Mandarin studio album recorded by Taiwanese singer Teresa Teng. It was released via Polydor Records on August 19, 1985. The album spawned the single "Changhuan", which was originally released in Japan as "Tsugunai" in 1984.

== Background and release ==
Changhuan was released through Polydor Records on August 19, 1985. The titular track is a Mandarin version of Teng's Japanese single "Tsugunai" (1984), composed by Miki Takashi. The Mandarin lyrics were written by Lin Huang-kun.

== Reception ==
Changhuan was certified platinum by the International Federation of the Phonographic Industry Hong Kong (IFPIHK) in 1988.

== Track listing ==
Changhuan track listing
No.	Title	Length
1.	"Changhuan" (償還 Repay)	3:48
2.	"Tian Wai Tianshang Wu Tianyá" (天外天上無天涯 There is No End to the Sky Beyond the Sky)	4:08
3.	"Shi Qu de Chun Tian" (失去的春天 The Lost Spring)	4:04
4.	"Dong Zhi Lian Qing" (冬之戀情 Winter Love)	3:40
5.	"Xiang Ai Ru Wang Xi" (相愛如往昔 Love Each Other As Before)	4:17
6.	"Yue Ye Shu Qing" (月夜訴情 Confession of Love on a Moonlight Night)	4:22
7.	"Ai Ren" (愛人 Spouse)	3:46
8.	"Xue De Shang de Hui Yi" (雪地上的回憶 Memories in the Snow)	3:44
9.	"Bu Zhao Hen Ji" (不著痕跡 No Trace Left)	4:06
10.	"Niang Xin" (娘心 A Mother's Heart)	3:47
11.	"Qing Ren de Guan Huai" (情人的關懷 Lover's Care)	3:41
12.	"Ru Guo Mei You Ni" (如果没有你 Without You)	5:07
Total length:		48:30

== Credits and personnel ==
- Teresa Teng – vocals
- Hiroshi Misaka – producer
- William Kwan – producer
- Tony Tang – producer
- Rick Lam – cover design
- Tetsuya Fukuzumi – director
- Johnny Koo – photography

== Certifications ==
Region	Certification	Certified units/sales
Hong Kong (IFPI Hong Kong)	Platinum	50,000^{*}
^{*} Sales figures based on certification alone.
