= Lovers (Princess Princess album) =

Studio album by Princess Princess
- Released: November 17, 1989
- Recorded: 1989
- Genres: J-pop; rock
- Length: 44:21
- Language: Japanese
- Label: CBS Sony
- Producer: Princess Princess

Princess Princess chronology
Let's Get Crazy (1988)	Lovers (1989)	Princess Princess (1990)

Lovers (ラヴァーズ, Ravāzu) is the fourth studio album by the Japanese girl band Princess Princess, released on November 17, 1989, by CBS Sony. While no singles were generated by the album, "Papa" was included as the B-side of the band's third No. 1 single "Oh Yeah!".

The album became the band's first to hit No. 1 on Oricon's albums chart. It was also certified as a Million seller and Quadruple Platinum by the RIAJ.

== Track listing ==
All music is composed by Kaori Okui, except where indicated; all music is arranged by Princess Princess.

No.	Title	Lyrics	Music	Length
1.	"Moonlight Story" (Mūnraito Sutōrī (ムーンライト ストーリー))	Kanako Nakayama		4:45
2.	"Tomodachi no Mama" ((友達のまま; "Remaining as a Friend"))	Kyōko Tomita		5:02
3.	"Ding Dong"	Nakayama		3:56
4.	"Rain" (Rein (レイン))	Tomita	Nakayama	5:08
5.	"Koi ni Ochitara" ((恋に落ちたら; "If You Fall in Love"))	Okui	Tomoko Konno	3:57
6.	"Spy in Love" (Supai in Ravu (スパイ イン ラヴ))	Atsuko Watanabe	Watanabe; Okui; Nakayama	4:15
7.	"Shake It Off" (Sheiku Itto Ofu (シェイク イット オフ))	Konno		4:01
8.	"Papa" ((パパ))	Nakayama		5:16
9.	"Kaizoku to Watashi" ((海賊と私; "The Pirates and Me"))	Konno	Okui; Nakayama	4:33
10.	"Parade Shiyō yo" (Parēdo shiyō yo (パレードしようよ; "Let's Parade"))	Tomita		3:28
Total length:				44:21

== Charts ==
Chart (1989)	Peak position
Japanese Albums (Oricon)	1

== Certification ==
Region	Certification	Certified units/sales
Japan (RIAJ)	4× Platinum	1,600,000^{^}
^{^} Shipments figures based on certification alone.

== See also ==
- 1989 in Japanese music
