= Japan Cable Awards =

Annual music awards in Japan

- Sponsored by: National Cable Music Broadcasters Association
- Country: Japan
- First award: December 1, 1968; 57 years ago
- Final award: December 4, 2017; 8 years ago

Highlights
- Most awards: Kiyoshi Hikawa (8 times)
- Website: www.tbs.co.jp/yusenaward/

Japan Cable Awards (日本有線大賞, Nihon Yūsen Taishō) are an annual set of music awards, sponsored by the National Cable Music Broadcasters Association (全国有線音楽放送協会).

The awards were presented annually since 1968 and are based on requests from the audience received by cable broadcasters. The awards ended in 2017; Kiyoshi Hikawa, who is a Japanese enka singer, keeps the record for most Grand Prix.

== List of Grand Prix winners ==
| No. | Broadcast date | Winner | Winning song |
|---|---|---|---|
| 1 | December 1, 1968 | Shinichi Mori | "Sakariba Blues" (盛り場ブルース) |
| 2 | December 7, 1969 | Shinichi Mori | "Minatomachi Blues" (港町ブルース) |
| 3 | December 6, 1970 | Hiroshi Uchiyamada and Cool Five | "Uwasa no Onna" (噂の女) |
| 4 | December 5, 1971 | Kōji Tsuruta | "Kizu Darake no Jinsei" (傷だらけの人生) |
| 5 | December 3, 1972 | Ouyang Fei Fei | "Ame no Airport" (雨のエア・ポート) |
| 6 | December 2, 1973 | Hiroshi Uchiyamada and Cool Five | "Soshite, Kōbe" (そして、神戸) |
| 7 | December 8, 1974 | Aki Yashiro | "Ai Hitosuji" (愛ひとすじ) |
| 8 | December 7, 1975 | Goro Noguchi | "Shitetsu Ensen" (私鉄沿線) |
| 9 | December 5, 1976 | Harumi Miyako | "Kita no Yadokara" (北の宿から) |
| 10 | December 4, 1977 | Kenji Sawada | "Katte ni Shiyagare" (勝手にしやがれ) |
| 11 | December 3, 1978 | Kenji Sawada | "Darling" (ダーリング) |
| 12 | December 2, 1979 | Jirō Atsumi | "Yume Oizake" (夢追い酒) |
| 13 | December 7, 1980 | Sachiko Kobayashi | "Tomari-gi" (とまり木) |
| 14 | December 6, 1981 | Tetsuya Ryū | "Okuhida Bojō" (奥飛騨慕情) |
| 15 | December 5, 1982 | Takashi Hosokawa | "Kita Sakaba" (北酒場) |
| 16 | December 2, 1983 | Harumi Miyako, Chiaki Oka | "Naniwa Koi Shigure" (浪花恋しぐれ) |
| 17 | December 7, 1984 | Teresa Teng | "Tsugunai" (つぐない) |
| 18 | December 6, 1985 | Teresa Teng | "Aijin" (愛人) |
| 19 | December 5, 1986 | Teresa Teng | "Toki no Nagare ni Mi o Makase" (時の流れに身をまかせ) |
| 20 | December 4, 1987 | Eiko Segawa | "Inochi Kurenai" (命くれない) |
| 21 | December 2, 1988 | Unsuku Kei | "Yume Onna" (夢おんな) |
| 22 | December 1, 1989 | Princess Princess | "Diamonds" |
| 23 | December 21, 1990 | Takao Horiuchi | "Koi Uta Tsuzuri" (恋唄綴り) |
| 24 | December 6, 1991 | Kaori Kōzai | "Nagare Koi Kusa" (流恋草) |
| 25 | December 4, 1992 | Ayako Fuji | "Kokoro Sake" (こころ酒) |
| 26 | December 3, 1993 | Gen Takayama | "Kokoro Kōrasete" (心凍らせて) |
| 27 | December 2, 1994 | Ayako Fuji | "Hana no Waltz" (花のワルツ) |
| 28 | December 1, 1995 | Yōko Nagayama | "Suterarete" (捨てられて) |
| 29 | December 8, 1996 | Sharam Q | "Namida no Kage " (涙の影) |
| 30 | December 5, 1997 | Glay | "However" |
| 31 | December 4, 1998 | L'Arc-en-Ciel | "Honey" (HONEY) |
| 32 | December 3, 1999 | Glay | "Winter, Again" (Winter,again) |
| 33 | December 15, 2000 | Yuki Koyanagi | "Aijō" (愛情) / "Be Alive" (be alive) |
| 34 | December 14, 2001 | Ayumi Hamasaki | "Dearest" |
| 35 | December 13, 2002 | Ayumi Hamasaki | "Voyage" |
| 36 | December 20, 2003 | Kiyoshi Hikawa | "Hakūn no Shiro" (白雲の城) |
| 37 | December 18, 2004 | Kiyoshi Hikawa | "Banba no Chūtarō" (番場の忠太郎) |
| 38 | December 17, 2005 | Kiyoshi Hikawa | "Omokage no Miyako" (面影の都) |
| 39 | December 16, 2006 | Kumi Koda | "Yume no Uta" (夢のうた) |
| 40 | December 12, 2007 | Kiyoshi Hikawa | "Kiyoshi no Sōran Bushi" (きよしのソーラン節) |
| 41 | December 17, 2008 | Exile | "Ti Amo" |
| 42 | December 20, 2009 | Kiyoshi Hikawa | "Tokimeki no Rumba" (ときめきのルンバ) |
| 43 | November 18, 2010 | Kiyoshi Hikawa | "Nijiiro no Bayon" (虹色のバイヨン) |
| 44 | December 10, 2011 | Mai Fukui | "Ikutabi no Sakura" (いくたびの櫻) |
| 45 | November 14, 2012 | Kiyoshi Hikawa | "Sakura" (櫻) |
| 46 | December 11, 2013 | Kiyoshi Hikawa | "Manten no Hitomi" (満天の瞳) |
| 47 | December 11, 2014 | Kaori Mizumori | "Shimane Koitabi" (島根恋旅) |
| 48 | December 15, 2015 | Sandaime J Soul Brothers | "Summer Madness" |
| 49 | December 5, 2016 | Nishino Kana | "Dear Bride" |
| 50 | December 4, 2017 | Kiyoshi Hikawa | "Otoko no Zesshō" (男の絶唱) |

== Winners in other categories ==
This is a partial list of artists who have won in other categories.

- AKB48 (Excellent Music Award and Special Award, 2011. Cable Music Excellence [Outstanding Performance] Award, 2012, 2013)
- Berryz Kobo (Cable Music Award, 2008)
- Cute (Cable Music Award, 2007)
- Kyary Pamyu Pamyu (Cable Music Excellence [Outstanding Performance] Award, 2013)

== Most Wins Overall ==
Including enka and pop artist.

| Rank | 1st | 2nd | 3rd | 4th | 5th | 6th | 7th |
|---|---|---|---|---|---|---|---|
| Artist | Kiyoshi Hikawa | Kaori Mizumori | K. Jikorou; Hiroshi Itsuki | AKB48; Teresa Teng; Miyako Otsuki; Akina Nakamori | Aki Yashiro; Takao Horiuchi; Kenji Sawada | Kana Nishino; JUJU; Shinichi Mori | Koda Kumi; Exile; Kye Eun-sook; Toshimi Tagawa; Hiroshi Uchiyamada; Harumi Miyako; Takashi Hosokawa |
| Total awards | 40 | 18 | 14 | 12 | 10 | 9 | 7 |
