= Tsugunai (song) =

1984–1985 single by Teresa Teng

- Japanese single cover

Single by Teresa Teng

from the album Tsugunai and Changhuan
- Language: Japanese; Mandarin
- Released: January 21, 1984
- Genre: Pop
- Length: 3:53
- Label: Taurus Records; PolyGram
- Songwriters: Araki Toyohisa; Lin Huang Kun
- Composer: Miki Takashi

Music video
- "Tsugunai" (つぐない) on YouTube "Changhuan" (償還) on YouTube

"Tsugunai" (つぐない; meaning "atonement" or "expiation"), is a song recorded by Taiwanese singer Teresa Teng. The original Japanese version was released on January 21, 1984, while the Mandarin version titled "Changhuan" (償還) was released a year later in August 1985 as part of her Mandarin album of the same name. Both versions of the song was composed by Miki Takashi, with the Japanese lyrics written by Araki Toyohisa and the Mandarin lyrics written by prominent lyricist Lin Huang-kun.

The success of the song in Japan brought Teresa Teng to the international stage outside of the Chinese-speaking world, especially in Asia. Both versions are frequently covered by various Japanese-speaking and Chinese-speaking singers. "Tsugunai" and "Changhuan" are regarded as Teng's signature songs.

== Background ==
Teresa Teng did not renew after she completed her contract with Polydor Records Japan, having seen lackluster sales result in Japan with her Japanese recordings and being temporary barred entry into Japan after her February 1979 passport fiasco, despite her moderate fame in Japan, in addition to already established fame in Chinese-speaking world. Meanwhile, she studied English and make music recordings in the United States. She also performed concerts both in US and Canada.

Two years later in 1981, after Japan lifted entry ban against her, she joined with her former Polydor agent Minoru Funaki and his followers who all left Polydor to found a new music company Taurus Records, and began working on a new album. Hiroshi Nishida was tasked with promoting the new album. Owing to her past passport scandal, a number of his colleagues weren't keen about promoting her upcoming album, regarded her as a jinx to music rating. One even bet against the album's success, saying he was willing to walk upside down along Omotesando street if the album did well. Under these circumstances, he was compelled to make the right moves strategically to overcome Japanese music chart behemoth and made the new album an extremely successful one. The song won several awards in a single year since her last 1974 hit song as a debutante in the Japanese music scene. Taurus Records' confidence grew and went on next two years on two successive wins.

Regardless of version, the song tells a woman's story who had suffered too much for love. In the Japanese version, the song is about a woman who has to leave her lover. To her, leaving is the best way forward to make things right, wanting him to find a more suitable lover than her. Despite this, privately she wishes for him not to forget her.

In the Mandarin version, the role is somewhat different. The song is about a man who has cheated on a woman. He tried to make amends with her but still carried on the affair. Having continued to love him, she tells him expiation is not an excuse to break her heart anymore, and she reluctantly leaves him.

== Music video ==
A music video for the Mandarin version of the song was filmed in Singapore, with some of the settings being pre-gentrified Boat Quay and Fort Canning Hill, specifically the Gothic Gates, during her concert tour in Singapore and Malaysia after winning multiple awards a year earlier.

== Reception ==
"Tsugunai" and "Changhuan" sold a combined 1.5 million copies globally, including 442,000 copies in Japan. This was more than her 1974 debut bilingual hit song "Kūkō" / "Qingren de Guanhuai" (空港 / 情人的關懷; "Airport" / "The Care of a Lover") that sold 750,000 copies globally. It was a huge success after Teng's earlier Japanese recordings had lackluster commercial success, and it brought her out of relative obscurity there. It was the beginning of her global breakthrough, particularly in Asia, outside of the Chinese-speaking world. "Tsugunai"/"Changhuan" are regarded as her signature songs. "Changhuan" is also one of the most well-known classics within the Chinese-speaking world.

Tsugunai entered the Jpop ranking list in April 1984 and stayed on the list for a year, notably reaching first place in August. It also stayed within the top 10 for 41 straight consecutive weeks between April 1984 and February 1985. At a full year since the release, it still ranked at 7th place. It also charted on the Oricon Singles Chart at 6th place for 43 weeks, which also tied with another popular 1986 bilingual signature song "Toki no Nagare ni Mi o Makase" / "Wo Zhi Zaihu Ni" for the same 6th place but held position longer for 57 weeks. Hong Kong's IFPIHK had certified the album as platinum album as well.

== Accolades ==
The song won the Japan Cable Awards (日本有線大賞) Grand Prix, All-Japan Cable Broadcasting Award Winner (全日本有線放送大賞) and Japan Enka Award (日本演歌大賞) in 1984, the first ever multiple wins in Japan.

Awards for "Tsugunai"
Year	Award	Category	Result	Ref.
1984	All Japan Cable Broadcasting Awards	Excellent Star Award (Half Year)	Won	
1984	All Japan Cable Broadcasting Awards	Grand Prize	Won	
1984	All Japan Cable Broadcasting Awards	Excellent Star Award (Yearly)	Won	
1984	Japan Cable Awards	Grand Prix	Won	
1984	Japan Cable Awards	Best Hit Award	Won	
1984	Japan Cable Awards	Cable Music Award	Won	
1984	Japan Enka Awards	Best Hit Award	Won	
1984	Japan Lyricist Awards	Best Song Award	Won	
1984	Japan Record Awards	Best Singer	Nominated	

== Charts ==
=== Weekly charts ===
Chart (1984)	Peak position
Japan Singles (Oricon)	6

=== Year-end charts ===
Chart (1984)	Position
Japan Singles (Oricon)	42

Chart (1985)	Position
Japan Singles (Oricon)	58

== Covers ==
Owing to the significance of both this widely-popular song and the singer, there are many other singers that covered this song in Japanese and Mandarin version alike. Some cover Japanese versions are:

- Chiyoko Shimakura on 特選集/人生はショータイム
- Sayuri Ishikawa on 昭和夢つばめ~あなたが選んだ好きな唄~
- Yuko Nakazawa on 1998 album 中澤ゆうこ 第一章
- Saori Yuki on 2016 album あなたと共に生きてゆく〜由紀さおり テレサ・テンを歌う〜, with both Japanese and Mandarin versions
- JUJU on 2016 album JUJU's Tavern – Song Request Night (スナックJUJU 〜夜のRequest〜)
- Misaki Iwasa on 2013 album titled Covered songs by request (リクエスト・カバーズ)
- VALSHE on 2014 album TRANSFORM/marvelous road
- Takeshi Tsuruno on 2016 album つるのうた3.5
- Keisuke Kuwata during his Act Against AIDS 2018 concert (Act Against AIDS 2018 平成三十年度! 第三回ひとり紅白歌合戦)
- Jun Shibata on 2019 album おはこ

Some cover Mandarin versions are:

- Fei Yu-ching on 2003 album titled When Will You Return? (何日君再來), containing his own works and various cover songs
- Daphne Tsai on 2003 Rare Love Songs – True Feeling (絕版情歌-真情)
- Sammi Cheng on 2004 Sammi vs Sammi
- Joanna Wang on 2011 The Things We Do For Love

== See also ==
- "Toki no Nagare ni Mi o Makase" / "Wo Zhi Zaihu Ni" (時の流れに身をまかせ) / (我只在乎你) – Teng's most successful bilingual 1986 signature song that also charted at 6th place but held position longer for 57 weeks.
- 1984 in Japanese music
