= Bee-Beep =

Studio album by Princess Princess
- Released: January 21, 1993
- Recorded: 1992
- Genres: J-pop; rock
- Length: 54:44
- Language: Japanese
- Label: Sony Records
- Producer: Princess Princess

Princess Princess chronology
Singles 1987–1992 (1992)	Bee-Beep (1993)	Majestic (1993)

Singles from Bee-Beep
- 1. "Power/Regret" Released: December 20, 1992

Alternative cover

Bee-Beep (ビー・ビープ, Bī Bīpu) is the seventh studio album by the Japanese girl band Princess Princess, released on January 21, 1993, by Sony Records. It includes the single "Power"/"Regret". The title track features all members on vocals. The initial release featured a "clockwork" cover with a disc that could be spun to feature the band members in different makeup.

The album became the fifth and final consecutive No. 1 release on Oricon's albums chart. It was also certified Platinum by the RIAJ.

== Track listing ==
All music is composed by Kaori Okui, except where indicated; all music is arranged by Princess Princess.

No.	Title	Lyrics	Music	Length
1.	"Guitar Man"	Okui		4:50
2.	"Melody Melody"	Kyōko Tomita		5:17
3.	"Kareshi ga Hoshii" ((彼氏がほしい; "I Want a Boyfriend"))	Okui	Kanako Nakayama	4:08
4.	"Bee-Beep (Puri-Puri Summit)" (Bī Bīpu Puri-Puri Samitto (BEE-BEEP プリプリ サミット))	Okui; Nakayama; Atsuko Watanabe; Tomoko Konno; Tomita	Nakayama	4:42
5.	"Uchi ni Kaerō" ((うちに帰ろう; "Let's Go Home"))	Tomita	Nakayama	4:08
6.	"Regret"	Nakayama		4:35
7.	"Minato no Mieru Oka" ((港の見える丘; "The Hill with a View of the Harbor"))	Nakayama		4:04
8.	"Power"	Tomita		4:10
9.	"Eyewitness"	Konno	Watanabe	4:04
10.	"Wedding"	Watanabe	Konno	4:49
11.	"Sweet Valentine"	Nakayama		5:20
12.	"Voice"	Konno	Konno	4:51
Total length:				54:44

== Charts ==
Chart (1993)	Peak position
Japanese Albums (Oricon)	1

== Certification ==
Region	Certification	Certified units/sales
Japan (RIAJ)	Platinum	400,000^{^}
^{^} Shipments figures based on certification alone.
