= Majestic (Princess Princess album) =

Studio album by Princess Princess
- Released: December 22, 1993
- Recorded: 1993
- Genres: J-pop; rock
- Length: 41:21
- Language: Japanese
- Label: Sony Records
- Producer: Princess Princess

Princess Princess chronology
Bee-Beep (1993)	Majestic (1993)	Presents (1994)

Singles from Majestic
- 1. "Futari ga Owaru Toki" Released: November 10, 1993

Majestic (マジェスティック, Majesutikku) is the eighth studio album by the Japanese girl band Princess Princess, released on December 22, 1993, by Sony Records. It includes the single "Futari ga Owaru Toki". The album's songs are themed around breakups.

The album peaked at No. 2 on Oricon's albums chart. It was also certified Gold by the RIAJ.

== Track listing ==
All music is composed by Kaori Okui, except where indicated; all music is arranged by Princess Princess.

No.	Title	Lyrics	Music	Length
1.	"Kizuato" ((傷跡; "Scar"))	Kanako Nakayama		5:19
2.	"Bird's Eye View"	Tomoko Konno	Konno	4:23
3.	"Sayonara Darling" (Sayonara Dārin (さよならダーリン; "Goodbye, Darling"))	Kyōko Tomita		4:01
4.	"Glass Heaven"	Tomita		4:18
5.	"Futari ga Owari Toki" ((ふたりが終わる時; "When the Two Are Over"))	Nakayama		2:55
6.	"Koi wa Champion" (Koi wa Chanpion (恋するチャンピオン; "Champion in Love"))	Tomita	Tomita	3:47
7.	"Oh! Monkey Woman"	Nakayama	Nakayama	4:12
8.	"Kaze ga Fuitara" ((風が吹いたら; "When the Wind Blows"))	Atsuko Watanabe	Watanabe	4:28
9.	"Soreja ne" ((それじゃね; "That's It"))	Tomita		4:06
10.	"Kataomoi" ((片想い; "Unrequited Love"))	Nakayama		3:52
Total length:				41:21

== Charts ==
Chart (1993)	Peak position
Japanese Albums (Oricon)	2

== Certification ==
Region	Certification	Certified units/sales
Japan (RIAJ)	Gold	200,000^{^}
^{^} Shipments figures based on certification alone.
