= Princess Princess (album) =

Studio album by Princess Princess
- Released: December 21, 1990
- Recorded: 1990
- Genres: J-pop; rock
- Length: 50:52
- Language: Japanese
- Label: CBS Sony
- Producer: Princess Princess

Princess Princess chronology
Lovers (1989)	Princess Princess (1990)	Dolls in Action (1991)

Singles from Princess Princess
- 1. "Julian" Released: November 21, 1990

Princess Princess (プリンセス・プリンセス, Purinsesu Purinsesu) is the self-titled fifth studio album by the Japanese girl band Princess Princess, released on December 21, 1990, by CBS Sony. It includes the band's fourth No. 1 single "Julian". The album also features songs with different members doing vocals: "Sabitsuki Blues" with lead guitarist Kanako Nakayama and "Tsukiyo no Dekigoto" with keyboardist Tomoko Konno.

The album hit No. 1 on Oricon's albums chart, making it the band's second of five consecutive No. 1 albums. It was also certified as a Million seller and Triple Platinum by the RIAJ.

== Track listing ==
All music is composed by Kaori Okui, except where indicated; all music is arranged by Princess Princess.

No.	Title	Lyrics	Music	Length
1.	"Rock Me"	Okui		4:08
2.	"Tinkerbell" (Tinkāberu (ティンカーベル))	Kanako Nakayama		5:16
3.	"Taifū no Uta" ((台風の歌; "Typhoon Song"))	Kyōko Tomita	Okui; Nakayama	4:45
4.	"Nigero" ((逃げろ; "Run Away"))	Nakayama	Nakayama	5:09
5.	"Julian" (Jurian (ジュリアン))	Nakayama		5:10
6.	"Rollin' on the Corner"	Tomoko Konno		5:21
7.	"Sabitsuki Blues" (Sabitsuki Burūsu (錆びつきブルース; "Rusty Blues"))	Nakayama		3:24
8.	"Tsukiyo no Dekigoto" ((月夜の出来事; "Moonlit Night Events"))	Tomoko Konno	Konno	3:33
9.	"The Last Moment"	Tomita		4:51
10.	"Highway Star"	Atsuko Watanabe	Watanabe; Okui	4:54
11.	"One"	Tomita		4:22
Total length:				50:52

== Charts ==
Chart (1990)	Peak position
Japanese Albums (Oricon)	1

== Certification ==
Region	Certification	Certified units/sales
Japan (RIAJ)	3× Platinum	1,200,000^{^}
^{^} Shipments figures based on certification alone.

== See also ==
- 1990 in Japanese music
