= Singles 1987–1992 =

Compilation album by Princess Princess
- Released: July 15, 1992
- Recorded: 1987–1992
- Genres: J-pop; rock
- Length: 67:51
- Language: Japanese
- Label: Sony Records
- Producers: Princess Princess; Masanori Sasaji

Princess Princess chronology
Dolls in Action (1991)	Singles 1987–1992 (1992)	Bee-Beep (1993)

Singles from Singles 1987–1992
- 1. "Sekai de Ichiban Atsui Natsu" Released: July 16, 1987; 2. "Diamonds" Released: April 21, 1989; 3. "Sekai de Ichiban Atsui Natsu (Original Version)" Released: July 1, 1989; 4. "Oh Yeah!" Released: April 21, 1990; 5. "Kiss" Released: May 10, 1991

Alternate cover
- Limited Edition cover

Singles 1987–1992 is the first compilation album by the Japanese girl band Princess Princess, released on July 15, 1992, by Sony Records. The album compiles the band's singles from 1987 to 1992, including their five consecutive No. 1 hits "Diamonds", "Sekai de Ichiban Atsui Natsu", "Oh Yeah!", "Julian", and "Kiss".

The album stayed at No. 1 on Oricon's albums chart for four consecutive weeks, becoming the band's fourth of five consecutive No. 1 albums. It was also certified as a Million seller and Quadruple Platinum by the RIAJ.

== Track listing ==
All music is composed by Kaori Okui, except where indicated; all music is arranged by Princess Princess and Masanori Sasaji.

No.	Title	Lyrics	Music	Length
1.	"The Private Fanfare" (Instrumental)			3:51
2.	"19 Growing Up -Ode to My Buddy-"	Kyōko Tomita		4:15
3.	"Sekai de Ichiban Atsui Natsu ('92 Mix)" ((世界でいちばん熱い夏 ('92mix); "The Hottest Summer in the World ('92 Mix)"))	Tomita		3:47
4.	"Oh Yeah!"	Kanako Nakayama		4:08
5.	"Kiss"	Tomita; Nakayama	Nakayama	4:31
6.	"Julian" (Jurian (ジュリアン))	Nakayama		5:07
7.	"Koi wa Balance ('92 Mix)" (Koi wa Baransu ('92mix) (恋はバランス; "Love Is a Balance ('92 Mix)"))	Nakayama	Kisaburō Suzuki	3:43
8.	"Go Away Boy"	Nakayama	Nakayama	4:11
9.	"Get Crazy!"	Nakayama		4:35
10.	"M"	Tomita		4:33
11.	"My Will ('92 Mix)"	Tomoko Konno		4:17
12.	"Jungle Princess" (Janguru Purinsesu (ジャングルプリンセス))	Konno	Nakayama	5:04
13.	"Seven Years After"	Tomita		4:43
14.	"Pilot ni Naritakute" (Pairotto ni Naritakute (パイロットになりたくて; "I Want to Be a Pilot"))	Nakayama	Konno	4:20
15.	"Diamonds" (Daiamondo (ダイアモンド))	Nakayama		4:58
16.	"Hare ta Hi ni" ((晴れた日に; "On a Sunny Day"))	Tomita		4:28
Total length:				67:51

== Charts ==
Chart (1992)	Peak position
Japanese Albums (Oricon)	1

== Certification ==
Region	Certification	Certified units/sales
Japan (RIAJ)	4× Platinum	1,600,000^{^}
^{^} Shipments figures based on certification alone.
