= Let's Get Crazy (album) =

Studio album by Princess Princess
- Released: November 21, 1988
- Recorded: 1988
- Genre: J-pop; rock
- Length: 47:25
- Language: Japanese
- Label: CBS Sony

Princess Princess chronology
Here We Are (1988)	Let's Get Crazy (1988)	Lovers (1989)

Singles from Let's Get Crazy
- 1. "Get Crazy!" Released: October 21, 1988

Let's Get Crazy (レッツ ゲット クレイジー, Rettsu Getto Kureijī) is the third studio album by the Japanese girl band Princess Princess, released on November 21, 1988, by CBS Sony. It features the single "Get Crazy!" and the song "M", which was released as the B-side of the band's first No. 1 hit "Diamonds".

The album peaked at No. 2 on Oricon's albums chart.

== Track listing ==
All music is arranged by Princess Princess.

Side A
No.	Title	Lyrics	Music	Length
1.	"Get Crazy!"	Kanako Nakayama	Kaori Okui	4:36
2.	"Sorenari ni Ii Hito" ((それなりに いいひと; "A Good Person as He Is"))	Tomoko Konno	Okui	4:46
3.	"Stay There"	Kyōko Tomita	Okui	4:31
4.	"Love and Blood"	Tomita	Nakayama; Okui	4:10
5.	"Hetchara" ((へっちゃら; "Hey"))	Okui	Nakayama	3:30

Side B
No.	Title	Lyrics	Music	Length
1.	"Yūhi ga Yondeiru" ((夕陽がよんでいる; "The Setting Sun Is Calling"))	Atsuko Watanabe	Nakayama	4:29
2.	"Hitomi dake wa Mitsumenai" ((瞳だけはみつめない; "Can't be seen only by the eyes"))	Watanabe	Okui	4:29
3.	"Hitorijime" ((ひとりじめ; "Alone"))	Konno	Konno	4:15
4.	"Street Woman" (Sutorīto Ūman (ストリート・ウーマン))	Nakayama	Okui; Nakayama	4:10
5.	"M"	Tomita	Okui	4:35
6.	"Heart Stompin' Music"	Konno	Okui	4:10

== Charts ==
Chart (1988)	Peak position
Japanese Albums (Oricon)	2

== See also ==
- 1988 in Japanese music
