= Here We Are (Princess Princess album) =

Studio album by Princess Princess
- Released: February 26, 1988
- Recorded: 1987
- Genres: J-pop; rock
- Length: 42:34
- Language: Japanese
- Label: CBS Sony

Princess Princess chronology
Teleportation (1987)	Here We Are (1988)	Let's Get Crazy (1988)

Singles from Here We Are
- 1. "My Will" Released: July 16, 1987; 2. "19 Growing Up (Ode to My Buddy)" Released: February 26, 1988; 3. "Go Away Boy" Released: May 21, 1988

Here We Are (ヒア ウィー アー, Hia Uī Ā) is the second studio album by the Japanese girl band Princess Princess, released on February 26, 1988, by CBS Sony. It features the singles "My Will", "19 Growing Up (Ode to My Buddy)", and "Go Away Boy".

The album peaked at No. 8 on Oricon's albums chart.

== Track listing ==
All music is arranged by Princess Princess.

Side A
No.	Title	Lyrics	Music	Length
1.	"19 Growing Up (Ode to My Buddy)"	Kyōko Tomita	Kaori Okui	4:17
2.	"Wonder Castle"	Tomoko Konno	Okui	3:35
3.	"My Will"	Konno	Okui	4:18
4.	"Flame"	Atsuko Watanabe	Konno	4:50
5.	"Keep on Lovin' You"	Watanabe	Okui; Konno	4:07

Side B
No.	Title	Lyrics	Music	Length
1.	"Go Away Boy"	Kanako Nakayama	Nakayama	4:14
2.	"She"	Nakayama	Konno	4:46
3.	"Romancin' Blue"	Tomita	Okui	5:04
4.	"Jōdan ja Nai" ((冗談じゃない; "I'm Not Joking"))	Konno	Nakayama	3:37
5.	"Koi no Pending" (Koi no Pendingu (恋のペンディング; "Love Pending"))	Okui	Okui	3:46

== Charts ==
Chart (1988)	Peak position
Japanese Albums (Oricon)	8

== See also ==
- 1988 in Japanese music
