= Dolls in Action =

Studio album by Princess Princess
- Released: December 7, 1991
- Recorded: 1991
- Genres: J-pop; rock
- Length: 44:56
- Language: Japanese
- Label: Sony Records
- Producer: Princess Princess

Princess Princess chronology
Princess Princess (1990)	Dolls in Action (1991)	Singles 1987–1992 (1992)

Singles from Dolls in Action
- 1. "Seven Years After" Released: October 25, 1991; 2. "Jungle Princess" Released: February 5, 1992

Dolls in Action (ドールズ・イン・アクション, Dōruzu in Akushon) is the sixth studio album by the Japanese girl band Princess Princess, released on December 7, 1991, by Sony Records. It includes the singles "Seven Years After" and "Jungle Princess". "Joker to 100-ri no Mōja" features lead guitarist Kanako Nakayama on vocals.

The album stayed No. 1 on Oricon's albums chart for three consecutive weeks, making it the band's third of five consecutive No. 1 albums. It was also certified as Double Platinum by the RIAJ.

== Track listing ==
All music is composed by Kaori Okui, except where indicated; all music is arranged by Princess Princess.

No.	Title	Lyrics	Music	Length
1.	"Dear"	Kyōko Tomita		2:25
2.	"Namae no Nai Machi" ((名前のない町; "The Nameless Town"))	Kanako Nakayama		4:40
3.	"Jungle Princess" (Janguru Purinsesu (ジャングルプリンセス))	Tomoko Konno	Nakayama	5:07
4.	"Sora Yori Umi Yori (Puri-Puri Samba '91" ((空より海より（プリプリサンバ'91）; "From the Sky to the Sea (Puri-Puri Samba '91)"))	Tomita		3:19
5.	"Sabaku no Taiyō" ((砂漠の太陽; "Desert Sun"))	Okui		3:13
6.	"Joker to 100-ri no Mōja" (Jōkā to Hyakuri no Mōja (ジョーカーと100人の亡者; "Joker and 100 Dead"))	Nakayama	Nakayama; Okui	3:31
7.	"Seven Years After"	Tomita		4:45
8.	"Summer Madness"	Atsuko Watanabe	Okui; Watanabe	5:44
9.	"Come Back"	Tomoko Konno	Konno	4:15
10.	"Romance" (Romansu (ロマンス))	Nakayama		4:50
11.	"I Love You"	Nakayama		3:07
Total length:				44:56

== Charts ==
Chart (1991)	Peak position
Japanese Albums (Oricon)	1

== Certification ==
Region	Certification	Certified units/sales
Japan (RIAJ)	2× Platinum	800,000^{^}
^{^} Shipments figures based on certification alone.
