= Presents (Princess Princess album) =

Compilation album by Princess Princess
- Released: August 25, 1994
- Recorded: 1987–1994
- Genres: J-pop; rock
- Language: Japanese
- Label: Sony Records
- Producer: Princess Princess

Princess Princess chronology
Majestic (1993)	Presents (1994)	The Last Princess (1995)

Singles from Presents
- 1. "The Summer Vacation" Released: May 1, 1994

Alternative cover

Presents (プレゼンツ, Purezentsu) is the second compilation album by the Japanese girl band Princess Princess, released on August 25, 1994, by Sony Records. It consists of B-sides and deep cuts selected by the band's fans. The album was packaged in a box designed like a shipping box, while the CD was designed to resemble an LP.

The album peaked at No. 3 on Oricon's albums chart. It was also certified Gold by the RIAJ.

== Track listing ==
All music is composed by Kaori Okui, except where indicated; all music is arranged by Princess Princess.

No.	Title	Lyrics	Music	Length
1.	"Highway Star"	Atsuko Watanabe	Watanabe; Okui
2.	"So Long, Dreamer ('94 Mix)" (Sōrongu, Dorīmā (ソーロング、ドリーマー('94mix)))	Kyōko Tomita
3.	"Tomodachi no Mama" ((友達のまま; "Remaining as a Friend"))	Tomita
4.	"Melody Melody"	Tomita
5.	"Romancin' Blue"	Tomita
6.	"You Are My Starship ('94 Mix)" (Yū ā Mai Sutāshippu (ユー・アー・マイ・スターシップ('94mix)))	Tomita
7.	"Dakara Honey" (Dakara Hanī (だからハニー; "So Honey"))	Kanako Nakayama
8.	"Papa" ((パパ))	Nakayama
9.	"Stay There"	Tomita
10.	"Romance" (Romansu (ロマンス))	Nakayama
11.	"She"	Nakayama	Tomoko Konno
12.	"Kizuato" ((傷跡; "Scar"))	Nakayama
13.	"Kanashimi no Aru Fūkei" ((悲しみのある風景; "A Sad Landscape"))	Tomita
14.	"The Summer Vacation"	Nakayama
15.	"One"	Tomita
16.	"Ding Dong"	Nakayama

== Charts ==
Chart (1994)	Peak position
Japanese Albums (Oricon)	3

== Certification ==
Region	Certification	Certified units/sales
Japan (RIAJ)	Gold	200,000^{^}
^{^} Shipments figures based on certification alone.
