= The Last Princess (album) =

Studio album by Princess Princess
- Released: December 13, 1995
- Recorded: 1995
- Genres: J-pop; rock
- Length: 41:25
- Language: Japanese
- Label: Sony Records
- Producer: Princess Princess

Princess Princess chronology
Presents (1994)	The Last Princess (1995)	The Greatest Princess (1996)

Singles from The Last Princess
- 1. "Fly Baby Fly" Released: October 21, 1995

The Last Princess (ザ・ラスト・プリンセス, Za Rasuto Purinsesu) is the ninth and final studio album by the Japanese girl band Princess Princess, released on December 13, 1995, by Sony Records. It includes the single "Fly Baby Fly". Prior to the release of the album, the band notified their label of their retirement in April 1995, citing friction between members over their musical direction. They announced their disbandment in August, and performed their final tour in 1996 before parting ways.

The album peaked at No. 10 on Oricon's albums chart.

== Track listing ==
All music is composed by Kaori Okui, except where indicated; all music is arranged by Princess Princess.

No.	Title	Lyrics	Music	Length
1.	"Bye Bye"	Kanako Nakayama		4:57
2.	"Propose" (Puropōzu (プロポーズ))	Nakayama		4:08
3.	"Nagisa wa Namida no Paradise" (Nagisa wa Namida no Paradaisu (渚は涙のパラダイス; "The Beach Is a Paradise of Tears"))	Tomoko Konno	Atsuko Watanabe	3:54
4.	"Garakuta wo Fuki Tobase" ((ガラクタヲ吹キ飛バセ))	Nakayama	Watanabe	5:05
5.	"Hello!!"	Konno		3:37
6.	"Himawari to Cardigan" (Himawari to Kādigan (ひまわりとカーディガン; "Sunflower and Cardigan"))	Kyōko Tomita	Watanabe	4:17
7.	"Koi wa Cantare" (Koi wa Kantāre (恋はカンターレ; "Love Is a Cantare"))	Tomita	Konno	3:39
8.	"Jun'ai" ((純愛; "Pure Love"))	Nakayama		4:24
9.	"Maware! Merry-go-round" (Maware! Merīgōrando (まわれ! メリーゴーランド; "Turn! Merry-go-round"))	Tomita	Nakayama	3:36
10.	"Fly Baby Fly"	Tomita		3:48
Total length:				41:25

== Charts ==
Chart (1995)	Peak position
Japanese Albums (Oricon)	10
