= Teleportation (album) =

Studio album by Princess Princess
- Released: May 21, 1987
- Recorded: 1987
- Genre: J-pop; rock
- Length: 44:37
- Language: Japanese
- Label: CBS Sony

Princess Princess chronology
Kiss de Crime (1986)	Teleportation (1987)	Here We Are (1988)

Singles from Teleportation
- 1. "Koi wa Balance" Released: April 22, 1987

Teleportation (テレポーテーション, Terepōtēshon) is the first studio album by the Japanese girl band Princess Princess, released on May 21, 1987, by CBS Sony. It features the band's debut single "Koi wa Balance". In contrast to the band's 1986 debut EP Kiss de Crime, the album features songwriting credits primarily by the band members.

The album peaked at No. 38 on Oricon's albums chart.

== Track listing ==
All music is arranged by Princess Princess.

Side A
No.	Title	Lyrics	Music	Length
1.	"Girls' Night" (Gāruzu naito (ガールズ・ナイト))	Kanako Nakayama	Kaori Okui	4:43
2.	"Koi wa Balance" (Koi wa Baransu (恋はバランス; "Love Is a Balance"))	Kyōko Tomita	Kisaburō Suzuki	4:09
3.	"Iwanai de" ((言わないで; "Don't Say It"))	Tomoko Konno	Okui; Atsuko Watanabe; Nakayama	4:25
4.	"So Long, Dreamer" (Sōrongu, Dorīmā (ソーロング、ドリーマー))	Tomita	Okui	4:18
5.	"Omoide no Sukima" ((思い出の隙間; "Sad Memories"))	Nakayama	Nakayama	5:13

Side B
No.	Title	Lyrics	Music	Length
1.	"You Are My Starship" (Yū ā Mai Sutāshippu (ユー・アー・マイ・スターシップ))	Tomita	Okui	4:30
2.	"Umi ni Hito Shizuku" ((海にひとしずく; "Drop in the Sea"))	Konno	Konno	4:19
3.	"Hypnotized" (Hipunotaizudo (ヒプノタイズド))	Okui	Okui	4:33
4.	"Motion Emotion" (Mōshon Emōshon (モーション・エモーション))	Nakayama	Okui; Nakayama; Watanabe; Konno; Tomita; Etsurō Katano	4:16
5.	"Vibration" (Vaiburēshon (ヴァイブレーション))	Nakayama	Nakayama	4:11

== Charts ==
Chart (1987)	Peak position
Japanese Albums (Oricon)	38

== See also ==
- 1987 in Japanese music
