= Kiss de Crime =

EP by Princess Princess
- Released: May 21, 1986 (EP/CT); June 21, 1986 (CD)
- Recorded: 1986
- Genre: J-pop; rock
- Length: 23:34
- Language: Japanese
- Label: CBS Sony
- Producer: Tohru Okada

Princess Princess chronology
Kiss de Crime (1986)	Teleportation (1987)

Kiss de Crime (Kissで犯罪, Kisu de Kuraimu) is the debut EP by the Japanese girl band Princess Princess. Released on May 21, 1986 on EP and cassette and June 21, 1986 on CD, by CBS Sony, the EP was produced by Tohru Okada of the rock band Moonriders, and features songs written by Gorō Matsui, Hideya Nakazaki, Kenzō Saeki, Masaya Matsuura, and Keiko Asō. "Tokyo Kanojo" was the first song written by the band.

The EP peaked at No. 48 and the cassette version reached No. 76 on Oricon's albums chart.

== Track listing ==
Side A
No.	Title	Lyrics	Music	Arrangement	Length
1.	"Kiss de Crime" (Kisu de Kuraimu (Kissで犯罪))	Gorō Matsui	Hideya Nakazaki	Abe Ōji	3:47
2.	"Shōjo Amazoness" (Shōjo Amazonesu (少女・アマゾネス; "Girl Amazoness"))	Kenzō Saeki	Tohru Okada	Okada	4:06
3.	"AB/AC"	Saeki	Yōichirō Yoshikawa	Yoshikawa	4:00

Side B
No.	Title	Lyrics	Music	Arrangement	Length
1.	"Tokyo Kanojo" ((TOKYO彼女; "Tokyo Girlfriend"))	Matsui	Kaori Okui; Kanako Nakayama; Atsuko Watanabe; Tomoko Konno; Kyōko Tomita	Abe Ōji	4:09
2.	"Yasashii Satsui" ((やさしい殺意; "A Gentle Murder"))	Keiko Asō	Okada	Okada	3:53
3.	"Kuchizuke wa, Ohayame ni" ((くちづけは、お早めに; "Kiss Me as Soon as Possible"))	Saeki	Masaya Matsuura	Yoshikawa	3:39

== Charts ==
Chart (1986)	Peak position
Japanese Albums (Oricon)	48 (EP); 76 (CT)

== See also ==
- 1986 in Japanese music
