= I Only Care About You (album) =

1987 album by Teresa Teng

Studio album by Teresa Teng
- Released: April 1, 1987
- Genre: Mandopop
- Length: 42:21
- Language: Mandarin
- Label: Polydor

Teresa Teng chronology
Intoxicating Tango (1986)	I Only Care About You (1987)	Wakare no Yokan (1987)

Singles from I Only Care About You
- 1. "I Only Care About You" Released: April 1, 1987

I Only Care About You (Chinese: 我只在乎你; pinyin: Wǒ zhǐ zàihū nǐ) is a Mandarin studio album by Taiwanese recording artist Teresa Teng. It was released as her seventeenth studio album under Polydor Records Hong Kong on April 1, 1987, and is her final original studio album recorded in Mandarin. It features the hit song "I Only Care About You", which was originally recorded in Japanese in 1986.

== Songs ==
"Christmas in Summer" is a cover of the Japanese song "Merry X'mas in Summer", originally recorded by Kuwata Band member Yoshisuke Kuwata. "River of Destiny" is a cover of the Japanese original "Sadame Gawa". Teng wrote the Mandarin lyrics of both songs.

== Reception ==
"I Only Care About You" was a big hit in Greater China. The album was certified gold by the International Federation of the Phonographic Industry Hong Kong in 1988.

== Track listing ==
Side A
No.	Title	Length
1.	"Intoxicating Tango" (酒醉的探戈)	4:13
2.	"As Tender As a Fairy Tale" (像故事般溫柔)	4:34
3.	"River of Destiny" (命運之川)	3:48
4.	"Lover" (愛人)	3:48
5.	"Midnight's Gentle Breeze" (午夜微風)	4:21
Total length:		20:44

Side B
No.	Title	Length
6.	"Christmas in Summer" (夏日聖誕)	5:08
7.	"Not A Dragon and Not A Chi" (非龍非彲)	4:06
8.	"Without a Trace" (不著痕跡)	4:08
9.	"The Heart Passes by Dusk" (心路過黃昏)	4:03
10.	"I Only Care About You" (我只在乎你)	4:12
Total length:		21:37

== Credits and personnel ==
- Teresa Teng – vocals, composer
- Zhuang Nu – lyricist
- Sun Yi – lyricist
- Chiung Yao – lyricist
- Weng Ching-hsi – composer
- Gu Yue – composer

== Certifications ==
Region	Certification	Certified units/sales
Hong Kong (IFPI Hong Kong)	Gold	25,000^{*}
^{*} Sales figures based on certification alone.
