= Toki no Nagare ni Mi o Makase =

1986-1987 single by Teresa Teng

"Toki no Nagare ni Mi o Makase / I Only Care About You"
- Japanese single cover

Single by Teresa Teng

from the album Toki no Nagare ni Mi o Makase and I Only Care About You
- Released: February 21, 1986 (Japanese); April 1, 1987 (Mandarin)
- Genre: Pop
- Length: 4:49
- Label: Taurus
- Composer: Takashi Miki
- Lyricists: Toyohisa Araki; Shen Chih

Teresa Teng singles chronology
"Aijin" (1985)	"Toki no Nagare ni Mi o Makase / I Only Care About You" (1986)	"Scandal" (1986)

Music video
- 時の流れに身をまかせ on YouTube 我只在乎你 on YouTube

"Toki no Nagare ni Mi o Makase" (Japanese: 時の流れに身をまかせ; meaning "Give Yourself to the Flow of Time") is a song recorded by Taiwanese singer Teresa Teng in both Japanese and Mandarin. The original version was released as a CD single in Japan on February 21, 1986, for her Japanese studio album of the same name (1986).

The following year, Teng recorded a Mandarin Chinese version of the song, titled "I Only Care About You" (Chinese: 我只在乎你). It served as a single for her Chinese studio album also of the same name, which was released through Polygram Records on April 1, 1987.

The song was a big success in both Japan and the Chinese-speaking world. In Japan, "Toki no Nagare ni Mi o Makase" won the Grand Prix (most prestigious award) at the 1986 Japan Cable Awards and the All Japan Cable Broadcasting Awards, making Teng the only non-Japanese artist to have won either award for three consecutive years. In 1997, it was voted the 16th greatest Japanese song of all time in a nationwide survey conducted by the Japan Broadcasting Corporation (NHK).

== Background and release ==
The original Japanese version "Toki no Nagare ni Mi o Makase" served as the lead single for Teng's Japanese studio album of the same name, released on July 31, 1986. The song was composed by Takashi Miki, with lyrics penned by Toyohisa Araki. "Toki no Nagare ni Mi o Makase" was one of the most popular songs in Japan in 1986, with its parent album selling over 2 million copies.

A Mandarin version of the song was recorded with the title of "I Only Care About You" (我只在乎你; Wǒ zhǐ zàihū nǐ), with new lyrics penned by Shen Chih. It was included in her Mandarin album of the same name in April 1987. "I Only Care About You" subsequently achieved widespread popularity in mainland China.

== Live performances ==
Teng performed the song live at the 37th NHK Kōhaku Uta Gassen in 1986, and at the 42nd NHK Kōhaku Uta Gassen in 1991. It has been covered by many artists since its release.

== Impact and legacy ==
The song is well known in Asia and has been recorded by musicians into the 21st century in Taipei and Kuala Lumpur. In a national survey conducted by the Japan Broadcasting Corporation (NHK) in 1997, the song was ranked 16th among the 100 greatest Japanese songs of all time, the highest position for a song by a non-Japanese artist. In a 2010 survey conducted by the Teresa Teng Foundation to determine Teng's most popular hits, "I Only Care About You" received the second-most votes. In August 2021, "Toki no Nagare ni Mi o Makase" was ranked as the 9th best Japanese pop song of the 1980s by Music Magazine.

== Accolades ==
"Toki no Nagare ni Mi o Makase" won the Grand Prix (the most prestigious award in Japanese music) at the 19th Japan Cable Awards and the 19th All Japan Cable Broadcasting Awards (yearly), making Teng the only artist to have won the Grand Prix for three consecutive years at both events.

Awards for "Toki no Nagare ni Mi o Makase"
Award	Year	Category	Result	Ref.
All Japan Cable Broadcasting Awards	1986	Grand Prix (Yearly)	Won	
All Japan Cable Broadcasting Awards	1986	Excellent Star Award (Yearly)	Won	
Japan Cable Awards	1986	Grand Prix	Won	
Japan Cable Awards	1986	Best Hit Song Award	Won	
Japan Cable Awards	1986	Wired Music Award	Won	
Japan Record Awards	1986	Grand Prix	Nominated	
Japan Record Awards	1986	Gold Award	Won	

== Track listing ==
Japanese CD single

No.	Title	Length
1.	"Toki no Nagare ni Mi o Makase (時の流れに身をまかせ)"	4:14
2.	"Tasogare (黄昏)"	2:41
Total length:		6:55

== Charts ==
=== Weekly charts ===
Chart (1986)	Peak position
Japan Singles (Oricon)	6

Chart (2024)	Peak position
South Korea BGM (Circle)	155

=== Year-end charts ===
Chart (1986)	Position
Japan Singles (Oricon)	62

Chart (1987)	Position
Japan Singles (Oricon)	42

== Certifications ==
Region	Certification	Certified units/sales
Japan (RIAJ) Digital download	Platinum	250,000^{*}
^{*} Sales figures based on certification alone.

== See also ==
- 1986 in Japanese music
