= NapsaQ =

Japanese band

- Origin: Japan
- Genres: J-pop
- Years active: 2006–present
- Labels: Pony Canyon
- Members: Mikuni Shimokawa; Hiroyuki Matsugashita; Takayuki Ito
- Website: napsaq.net

NapsaQ (ナップサック, Nappu Sakku) is a Japanese three-piece band formed by Mikuni Shimokawa, Hiroyuki Matsugashita, and Takayuki Ito. They are distributed under Pony Canyon. To date, they have released one album on December 20, 2006 entitled NapsaQ~Seishun Song Request~ (NapsaQ〜青春ソングリクエスト〜). Shimokawa's upcoming single, Bird, will include a song performed by the band.

NapsaQ has a radio show named Shimokawa Mikuni no Mikumori. (下川みくにのみくもりっ。) on JOQR which began its weekly broadcast on October 4, 2006 from 0230-0300. The show no longer appears to be airing as it is not listed on JOQR's schedule. The opening theme song of the show is PicniQ and its ending theme song is Oyasumi (おやすみ), both of which are tracks performed by NapsaQ.
