= Kiss (Princess Princess song) =

1991 song by Princess Princess

Single by Princess Princess

from the album Singles 1987–1992
- Language: Japanese
- B-side: "Bara-iro no Jinsei"
- Released: May 10, 1991
- Recorded: 1991
- Genre: J-pop; rock
- Length: 4:32
- Label: Sony Records
- Songwriters: Kyōko Tomita; Kanako Nakayama; Kaori Okui
- Producer: Masanori Sasaji

Princess Princess singles chronology
"Julian" (1990)	"Kiss" (1991)	"Seven Years After" (1991)

Music video
- "Kiss" on YouTube

"Kiss" (キス, Kisu) is the eleventh single by Japanese band Princess Princess. Written by Kyōko Tomita, Kanako Nakayama, and Kaori Okui, the single was released by Sony Records on May 10, 1991. It became their fifth and final No. 1 singles on Oricon's singles chart.

== Background ==
"Kiss" was used by Suntory Foods for their Kōcha no Ki commercials. The song's original key is C.

== Chart performance ==
"Kiss" hit No. 1 on Oricon's singles chart and No. 26 on Oricon's year-ending chart in 1991. It also sold over 401,000 copies and was certified Platinum by the RIAJ.

== Track listing ==
All music is arranged by Princess Princess.

1991 single
No.	Title	Lyrics	Music	Length
1.	"Kiss"	Kyōko Tomita; Kanako Nakayama	Kaori Okui	4:32
2.	"Bara-iro no Jinsei" ((バラ色の人生; lit. "Rose-colored Life"))	Nakayama	Nakayama	4:35

== Charts ==
Weekly charts
Chart (1991)	Peak position
Japanese Oricon Singles Chart	1

Year-end charts
Chart (1991)	Position
Japanese Oricon Singles Chart	26

== Certifications ==
Region	Certification	Certified units/sales
Japan (RIAJ)	Platinum	400,000^{^}
^{^} Shipments figures based on certification alone.
