= Diamonds (Princess Princess song) =

1989 song by Princess Princess

Single by Princess Princess

from the album Singles 1987–1992
- Language: Japanese
- B-side: "M"
- Released: April 21, 1989
- Recorded: 1989
- Genre: J-pop; rock
- Length: 5:02
- Label: CBS Sony
- Songwriters: Kanako Nakayama; Kaori Okui
- Producer: Princess Princess

Princess Princess singles chronology
| "Get Crazy" (1988) | "Diamonds" (1989) | "Sekai de Ichiban Atsui Natsu" (1989) |

Music video
- "Diamonds" on YouTube
- "M" on YouTube

"Diamonds" (ダイアモンド, Daiamondo) is the seventh single by Japanese band Princess Princess. Written by Kanako Nakayama and Kaori Okui, the single was released by CBS Sony on April 21, 1989. It became their first of five consecutive No. 1 singles on Oricon's singles chart.

== Background ==
Princess Princess' popularity was on the rise after their sixth single "Get Crazy!" was used as the theme song of the J-drama series of the same name in October 1988. "Diamonds" was released six months later. It was used by Sony for their cassette tape commercials. The song was also used by Suzuki for their Suzuki Kei commercial in 2001. It was included in the 2015 soundtrack album Yakuza 0 80's Hits! Collection. More recently, it was used by Acecook for their 2020 Soup Harusame commercial featuring Anne Nakamura.

The song's original key is E major (modulated to F major at the end).

The B-side is "M", with its lyrics written by Kyōko Tomita and originally released in the band's 1988 album Let's Get Crazy. In a 2012 Facebook post, Tomita explained that she had broken up with a man with the initial "M" and wrote the song as a means of retribution. "M" was re-released digitally on February 23, 2005, and was certified as Triple Platinum by the RIAJ in November 2014.

== Chart performance and reception ==
"Diamonds" hit No. 1 on Oricon's singles chart and was the No. 1 song on Oricon's year-ending chart in 1989. It also sold over 1,097,000 copies and was certified Triple Platinum by the RIAJ in August 1990.

The song won the Grand Prix at the 22nd Japan Cable Awards.

== Track listing ==
All music is composed by Kaori Okui and arranged by Princess Princess.

1989 single
| No. | Title | Lyrics | Length |
|---|---|---|---|
| 1. | "Diamonds" (Daiamondo (ダイアモンド)) | Kanako Nakayama | 5:02 |
| 2. | "M" | Kyōko Tomita | 4:34 |

1993 reissue
| No. | Title | Lyrics | Length |
|---|---|---|---|
| 1. | "Diamonds" | Nakayama | 5:01 |
| 2. | "M" | Tomita | 4:37 |
| 3. | "Sekai de Ichiban Atsui Natsu ('92 Mix)" ((世界でいちばん熱い夏('92 mix); lit. "The Hottest Summer in the World ('92 Mix)")) | Tomita | 3:48 |

== Chart positions ==
Weekly charts
| Chart (1989) | Peak position |
|---|---|
| Japanese Oricon Singles Chart | 1 |
| Japanese The Best Ten Chart | 1 |

Year-end charts
| Chart (1989) | Peak position |
|---|---|
| Japanese Oricon Singles Chart | 1 |
| Japanese The Best Ten Chart | 15 |

== Certifications ==
Diamonds

| Region | Certification | Certified units/sales |
|---|---|---|
| Japan (RIAJ) Physical single | 3× Platinum | 1,200,000^{^} |
| Japan (RIAJ) Digital single | Platinum | 250,000^{*} |
Streaming
| Japan (RIAJ) | Gold | 50,000,000^{†} |
^{*} Sales figures based on certification alone.^{^} Shipments figures based on certification alone.^{†} Streaming-only figures based on certification alone.

M

| Region | Certification | Certified units/sales |
|---|---|---|
| Japan (RIAJ) Digital single | 3× Platinum | 750,000^{*} |
^{*} Sales figures based on certification alone.

== Cover versions ==
Diamonds

- The Nolans covered the song and "M" in English on their 1992 album The Hottest Place on Earth, with lyrics by Des Dyer.
- Rockapella covered the song on their 1992 album To N.Y.
- Younha covered the song on the 2006 Princess Princess tribute album 14 Princess: Princess Princess Children.
- Aya Kiguchi covered the song on her 2007 album Ayati Trance ~Aya Curve Chūihō~.
- i*Be covered the song as their debut single in 2009.
- High-King covered the song on the 2009 Hello! Project cover album Chanpuru 1 ~Happy Marriage Song Cover Shū~.
- Jun Fukuyama covered the song on the 2010 Durarara!! soundtrack album Cover Song Collection CD.
- Morisanchu covered the song in a 2011 Toto Big commercial, with the YouTuber trio impersonating members of Princess Princess.
- Shoko Nakagawa covered the song on her 2011 cover album Shoko-tan Cover 4-2 ~Shoko Rock-hen~.
- Naomi Wakabayashi covered the song on the 2015 soundtrack album The Idolm@ster Master Artist 3-13: Ritsuko Akizuki.
- Misaki Aono covered the song in 2017.
- ClariS covered the song on their 2019 EP Summer Tracks: Natsu no Uta.
- Risky Melody covered the song on their 2019 single Diamonds Type A～C.
- Nemophila covered the song in 2020 for their YouTube channel. Kyōko Tomita played drums on the cover while Nemophila's drummer Tamu Murata was out on maternity leave. It reached a million views April 2022.
- Mone Kamishiraishi covered the song on her 2021 cover album Ano Uta 2.

M

- Nico Mono covered the song in 2005.
- Rythem covered the song as the B-side of their 2006 single "Kokoro Biidama" and in the 2006 Princess Princess tribute album 14 Princess: Princess Princess Children.
- NapsaQ covered the song on their 2006 album NapsaQ~Seishun Song Request~.
- Masayoshi Yamazaki covered the song on his 2007 cover album Cover All-Ho!.
- RSP covered the song as their 2008 single "M (Mō Hitotsu no Love Story)".
- Ai Shinozaki covered the song in 2008 as her debut single.
- Eric Martin covered the song in English on his 2008 cover album Mr. Vocalist.
- Atsuko Hiyajo covered the song on her 2008 cover album Okiniiri no Uta ~Favorite Songs~.
- ManaKana covered the song on their 2009 album Futari Uta.
- Takeshi Tsuruno covered the song on his 2009 album Tsuruno Uta.
- Kenji Okahira covered the song on his 2009 album I Love GM.
- Samurai Rose covered the song on their 2010 album Rouge & Martini.
- Yasushi Nakanishi covered the song on his 2010 album Standards 4.
- Megumi Yano covered the song on her 2010 album 〜me’ssage〜.
- Lovers Electro covered the song on their 2010 self-titled album.
- Marina Yamane covered the song on her 2010 EP Star E.P.
- SO-TA covered the song on their 2012 self-titled album.
- Hiromi Rainbow covered the song on her 2013 album Incomplete ~Traces of 5 Years~.
- Tomomi Kahara covered the song on her 2014 cover album Memories -Kahara Covers-.
- Ms. Ooja covered the song on her 2014 cover album Woman 2 ~Love Song Covers~.
- Hideaki Tokunaga covered the song on his 2016 cover album All Time Best Vocalist.
- Acid Black Cherry covered the song on their 2017 cover album Recreation 4.
- May J. covered the song on her 2019 compilation album Heisei Love Song Covers.
- Harami-chan covered the song on her 2020 cover album Harami Teishoku ~Streetpiano Collection~.

== See also ==
- 1989 in Japanese music
