= Julian (song) =

1990 song by Princess Princess

Single by Princess Princess

from the album Princess Princess
- Language: Japanese
- B-side: "Rock Me"
- Released: November 21, 1990
- Recorded: 1990
- Genre: J-pop; rock
- Length: 5:07
- Label: Sony Records
- Songwriters: Kanako Nakayama; Kaori Okui
- Producer: Masanori Sasaji

Princess Princess singles chronology
| "Oh Yeah!" (1990) | "Julian" (1990) | "Kiss" (1991) |

Music video
- "Julian" on YouTube
- "Rock Me" on YouTube

"Julian" (ジュリアン, Jurian) is the tenth single by Japanese band Princess Princess. Written by Kanako Nakayama and Kaori Okui, the single was released by Sony Records on November 21, 1990. It became their fourth of five consecutive No. 1 singles on Oricon's singles chart.

== Background ==
"Julian" was Princess Princess' first ballad single. While the title is a reference to the band's former name Julian Mama (ジュリアン・ママ, Jurian Mama), lead guitarist Kanako Nakayama named the song after her pet cat, which was given to her by Bow Wow lead vocalist Kyoji Yamamoto. Julian had lived with the band at their training camp in Nishi-Nippori, but shortly after the band left the training camp, he ran away and was never seen again. Despite the title, the song is not about Nakayama's cat, but a former lover of hers.

The song's original key is C.

The song was used by Citizen for their Lighthouse watch commercials. The B-side, "Rock Me", was used by Sony for their cassette tape commercials.

== Chart performance ==
"Julian" hit No. 1 on Oricon's singles chart and No. 13 on Oricon's year-ending chart in 1991. It also sold over 588,000 copies and was certified Platinum by the RIAJ.

== Track listing ==
All music is composed by Kaori Okui and arranged by Princess Princess.

1990 single
| No. | Title | Lyrics | Length |
|---|---|---|---|
| 1. | "Julian" (Jurian (ジュリアン)) | Kanako Nakayama | 5:07 |
| 2. | "Rock Me" | Kaori Okui | 4:05 |

== Chart positions ==
Weekly charts
| Chart (1990) | Peak position |
|---|---|
| Japanese Oricon Singles Chart | 1 |

Year-end charts
| Chart (1991) | Peak position |
|---|---|
| Japanese Oricon Singles Chart | 13 |

== Certifications ==
| Region | Certification | Certified units/sales |
|---|---|---|
| Japan (RIAJ) | Platinum | 400,000^{^} |
^{^} Shipments figures based on certification alone.

== Cover versions ==
- Honey Sac covered the song in their 2004 album 19 Growing Up.
- Viola covered the song in their 2008 album Le Table.
- Munehiro covered the song in her 2013 album Ankora feat. Kenty Gross.
- Yo Hitoto covered the song in her 2015 album Hitoto Uta.

== See also ==
- 1990 in Japanese music
