= Oh Yeah! (Princess Princess song) =

1990 song by Princess Princess

Single by Princess Princess

from the album Singles 1987–1992
- Language: Japanese
- B-side: "Papa"
- Released: April 21, 1990
- Recorded: 1990
- Genre: J-pop; rock
- Length: 4:08
- Label: CBS Sony
- Songwriters: Kanako Nakayama; Kaori Okui
- Producer: Masanori Sasaji

Princess Princess singles chronology
"Sekai de Ichiban Atsui Natsu" (1989)	"Oh Yeah!" (1990)	"Julian" (1990)

Music video
- "Oh Yeah!" on YouTube

"Oh Yeah!" (オー イェー!, Ō Iē!) is the ninth single by Japanese band Princess Princess. Written by Kanako Nakayama and Kaori Okui, the single was released by CBS Sony on April 21, 1990. It became their third of five consecutive No. 1 singles on Oricon's singles chart.

== Background ==
"Oh Yeah!" was written as a cheering song for the band's national tour "Panic Tour '90: Parade Shō yo!", which started in April that year. The song's original key is A.

The song was used by Sony for their HF-X/UX cassette tape commercials. The B-side, "Papa", was used by KDD for their telephone commercials.

== Chart performance ==
"Oh Yeah!" hit No. 1 on Oricon's singles chart and No. 5 on Oricon's year-ending chart in 1990. It also sold over 575,000 copies and was certified Platinum by the RIAJ.

== Track listing ==
All lyrics are written by Kanako Nakayama; all music is composed by Kaori Okui and arranged by Princess Princess.

1990 single
No.	Title	Length
1.	"Oh Yeah!"	4:08
2.	"Papa" ((パパ))	5:14

== Charts ==
Weekly charts
Chart (1990)	Peak position
Japanese Oricon Singles Chart	1

Year-end charts
Chart (1990)	Peak position
Japanese Oricon Singles Chart	5

== Certifications ==
Region	Certification	Certified units/sales
Japan (RIAJ)	Platinum	400,000^{^}
^{^} Shipments figures based on certification alone.

== See also ==
- 1990 in Japanese music
