= Sekai de Ichiban Atsui Natsu =

1989 song by Princess Princess

Single by Princess Princess

from the album Singles 1987–1992
- Language: Japanese
- English title: The Hottest Summer in the World
- B-side: "Vibration (1987); Sekai de Ichiban Atsui Natsu (Heisei Recording) (1989)"
- Released: July 16, 1987 (original release); July 1, 1989 (re-release)
- Recorded: 1987
- Genre: J-pop; rock
- Length: 3:42
- Label: CBS Sony
- Songwriters: Kyōko Tomita; Kaori Okui
- Producer: Masanori Sasaji

Princess Princess singles chronology
"Koi wa Balance" (1987)	"Sekai de Ichiban Atsui Natsu" (1987)	"My Will" (1987)

Princess Princess singles chronology
"Diamonds" (1989)	"Sekai de Ichiban Atsui Natsu" (1989)	"Oh Yeah!" (1990)

Alternative cover
- 1989 single cover

Music video
- "Sekai de Ichiban Atsui Natsu" on YouTube

"Sekai de Ichiban Atsui Natsu" (世界でいちばん熱い夏; lit. "The Hottest Summer in the World") is the second single by Japanese band Princess Princess. Written by Kyōko Tomita and Kaori Okui, the single was released by CBS Sony on July 16, 1987. It was re-released on July 1, 1989 as the band's eighth single, which became their second of five consecutive No. 1 singles on Oricon's singles chart.

== Background ==
"Sekai de Ichiban Atsui Natsu" was originally released on vinyl in 1987 with "Vibration" as the B-side. As Princess Princess was relatively unknown at the time, the single did not chart. The song was used in the TV Asahi travel show Sekai Dokkiri Watch (世界どっきりウォッチ; World Dokkiri Watch). The song's original key is A.

The song was re-released in 1989 as a CD single with the B-side being a re-recording of the song (known as the "Heisei Recording" (平成レコーディング, Heisei Rikōdingu)). The CD jacket was designed to resemble an airline ticket; the first edition release was colored gold while the regular release was colored pink. The Heisei version of the song was used in the TV Asahi travel show Itsuka Iku Tabi (いつか行く旅, To Travel Someday), and later on in 2026 as the ending theme of the sixth episode of the anime adaptation of Go For It, Nakamura!.

The song was remixed in the band's 1992 compilation album Singles 1987–1992.

In 2001, TBS aired the drama series Sekai de Ichiban Atsui Natsu (世界で一番熱い夏). It is not related to the Princess Princess song, though it is coincidental that Goro Kishitani, who starred in the drama, is married to former member Kaori Okui. To capitalize on the drama's popularity, SME Records reissued the song as a maxi-single with "Diamonds" on August 8.

To coincide with Princess Princess' reunion in 2012, the song was used by Sapporo Breweries for their Sapporo Ice Lager 7 commercial, featuring the band.

== Chart performance ==
"Sekai de Ichiban Atsui Natsu" hit No. 1 on Oricon's singles chart and No. 2 on Oricon's year-ending chart in 1989 - second only to the band's other hit "Diamonds". It also sold over 865,000 copies and was certified Double Platinum by the RIAJ in August 1990.

== Track listing ==
All music is composed by Kaori Okui and arranged by Princess Princess.

1987 single
No.	Title	Lyrics	Length
1.	"Sekai de Ichiban Atsui Natsu" ((世界でいちばん熱い夏; lit. "The Hottest Summer in the World"))	Kyōko Tomita	3:42
2.	"Vibration" (Vaiburēshon (ヴァイブレーション))	Kanako Nakayama	4:04

1989 single
No.	Title	Lyrics	Length
1.	"Sekai de Ichiban Atsui Natsu" (Original Version)	Tomita	3:45
2.	"Sekai de Ichiban Atsui Natsu (Heisei Recording)" ((世界でいちばん熱い夏 <平成レコーディング>))	Tomita	4:11

2001 maxi-single
No.	Title	Lyrics	Length
1.	"Sekai de Ichiban Atsui Natsu"	Tomita	3:45
2.	"Diamonds" (Daiamondo (ダイアモンド))	Nakayama	4:59

== Chart positions ==
Weekly charts
Chart (1989)	Peak position
Japanese Oricon Singles Chart	1

Year-end charts
Chart (1989)	Peak position
Japanese Oricon Singles Chart	2

== Certifications ==
Region	Certification	Certified units/sales
Japan (RIAJ) Physical single	2× Platinum	800,000^{^}
Japan (RIAJ) Full-length ringtone	Gold	100,000^{*}
^{*} Sales figures based on certification alone.^{^} Shipments figures based on certification alone.

== Cover versions ==
- The Nolans covered the song in English in their 1992 album The Hottest Place on Earth, with lyrics by Des Dyer.
- Patty & Jimmy covered the song in English in their 2003 album Fine, with lyrics by Suzi Kim.
- Kazumi Nikaidō covered the song in her 2008 album Nikasetra.
- Minori Chihara covered the song in her 2009 live video Minori Chihara Live 2009 "Summer Camp".
- Wakako Shimazaki covered the song in her 2009 single "Happy Life -Ashita ni Mukatte-".
- Eri Shingyōji covered the song in the 2009 various artists album R40 Dance! Dance!! Dance!!!.
- W.C.D.A. covered the song in their 2009 album Remix Collection 01 (J-pop Dance Remix).
- Akari Hokajō covered the song in her 2010 album Boo-year!.
- Naoya Urata covered the song in his 2013 cover album Unchanged.
- Ayumi Shibata covered the song in her 2014 album Kick Start.
- Ryūji Aoki covered the song in his 2015 album Voice 198X.
- Nozomi Nishida, Reina Kondō, Saki Minami, and Honoka Inoue covered the song in the 2018 Cinderella Nine image album Manatsu no Siren.
- The Biscats covered the song in their 2023 album J-Bop Summer.

== See also ==
- 1987 in Japanese music
