= Kaori Kishitani =

Japanese singer-songwriter

- 岸谷 香
- Born: Kaori Okui (奥居 香); February 17, 1967 (age 59); Hiroshima, Mie, Japan
- Occupation: Singer-songwriter
- Agent: All Spice Company
- Spouse: Gorō Kishitani (m. 1996)
- Children: 2, including Ranmaru Kishitani
- Musical career
- Genres: J-pop; rock
- Instruments: Vocals; guitar; piano; bass
- Years active: 1983–present
- Label: SME Records

Japanese name
- Kanji: 岸谷 香
- Hiragana: きしたに かおり
- Katakana: キシタニ カオリ
Transcriptions
- Romanization: Kishitani Kaori
- Website: kaorikishitani.com

Kaori Kishitani (岸谷 香, Kishitani Kaori) (born February 17, 1967), formerly Kaori Okui (奥居 香, Okui Kaori), is a Japanese musician and singer-songwriter, best known as the lead vocalist of the all-female rock band Princess Princess and currently the lead vocalist of the band Unlock the Girls. In addition to her career as a musician, she has written songs for several J-pop artists.

== Biography ==
Born in Hiroshima, Japan, Kaori Okui dropped out of Tamagawa Seigakuin Girls' High School and Nakano Junior and Senior High School.

=== Princess Princess ===
In 1983, Okui, guitarist Kanako Nakayama, bassist Atsuko Watanabe, keyboardist Tomoko Konno, and drummer Kyōko Tomita won a band audition hosted by TDK Records and formed Akasaka Komachi. After releasing a handful of singles and an EP, the band left TDK Records and changed their name to Julian Mama in 1985 before settling with the name Princess Princess and signing with CBS Sony in 1986. The band's breakout year was in 1989, when "Diamonds" became the first of five consecutive singles to hit No. 1 on Oricon's singles chart. By the mid-1990s, however, their popularity waned, and in 1996, Princess Princess disbanded.

After 16 years, Princess Princess reunited in November 2012 for several concerts in order to help with recovery from the 2011 Tōhoku earthquake and tsunami. They performed six concerts: November 3 and 4 at the Sendai Sun Plaza Hall, then November 20, 21, 23 and 24 at Nippon Budokan in Tokyo. In addition, the band performed at the Tokyo Dome on December 23 and 24, 2012, as well as the 2012 Kōhaku Uta Gassen on New Year's Eve. Princess Princess reunited again in 2016 for five concerts: March 11 to 13 at the Sendai Pit, and March 25 and 26 at the Toyosu Pit before once again parting ways.

=== Solo career ===
In 1994, Okui released her first solo singles "Kiseki no Toki" and "Vanishing"; she then released her solo debut album Renaissance on November 21. On March 4, 1995, one year prior to Princess Princess' disbandment, Okui held her first solo concert at NHK Hall. In 1997, after marrying actor Gorō Kishitani, she released her third single "Happy Man" and second album Shout. A year later, Okui released her third album Kaori.

She made the theme song for the Japanese version of Lassie (2005 film) called "Singing".

Her song ICE AGE ~Hyougaki no Kodomo-tachi~ is in the Japanese dub of Ice Age: The Meltdown.

In 2018, Kishitani made an appearance as a guest artist at the annual touring ice show Fantasy on Ice, where she performed to the song "Sekai de Ichiban Atsui Natsu" (lit. "The Hottest Summer in the World") in the show opening amongst others.

== Personal life ==
Okui married actor Gorō Kishitani in 1996 immediately after Princess Princess disbanded. After giving birth to her first son, Ranmaru in the summer of 2001, she took her husband's surname as her professional name. Kishitani gave birth to her daughter in the summer of 2003.

== Discography ==
=== Singles ===
List of singles, with selected chart positions
Title	Date	Peak chart positions	Sales (JPN)	RIAJ certification	Album
Title	Date	Oricon Singles Charts	Sales (JPN)	RIAJ certification	Album
"Kiseki no Toki"	August 1, 1994	15	66,000	N/A	Renaissance
"Vanishing"	October 21, 1994	26	42,000	N/A	Renaissance
"Happy Man"	April 16, 1997	32	34,000	N/A	Shout
"Sparkle"	December 1, 1997	78	4,000	N/A	Kaori
"Himawari"	May 30, 1998	—		N/A	Kaori
"Hello. Hello."	March 8, 2006	109		N/A	Ring to the Heavens
"Ice Age ~Hyōgaki no Kodomo-tachi~"	April 19, 2006	149		N/A	Ring to the Heavens
"Singing"	December 13, 2006	—		N/A	The Best and More
"Romantic Warriors"	June 25, 2014	67		N/A	Piece of Bright
"Dream"	June 24, 2015	102		N/A	Piece of Bright
"—" denotes releases that did not chart.

=== Studio albums ===
Year	Information	Oricon weekly peak position	Sales	RIAJ certification
1994	Renaissance: Released: November 21, 1994; Label: Sony Records; Formats: CD, cassette	12	71,000	
1997	Shout: Released: July 21, 1997; Label: Sony Records; Formats: CD, cassette	35	26,000	
1998	Kaori: Released: July 1, 1998; Label: Sony Records; Formats: CD	45	10,000	
2006	Ring to the Heavens: Released: May 31, 2006; Label: SME Records; Formats: CD	165		
2016	Piece of Bright: Released: May 25, 2016; Label: SME Records; Formats: CD, digital	28		
2018	Unlock the Girls: Released: January 24, 2018; Label: SME Records; Formats: CD, digital	69		
2019	Unlock the Girls 2: Released: May 1, 2019; Label: SME Records; Formats: CD, digital	117		

=== Compilations ===
Year	Information	Oricon weekly peak position	Sales	RIAJ certification
2014	The Best and More: Released: May 11, 2005; Label: SME Records; Formats: CD, digital	58		

=== Songwriting credits ===
- Mana Ashida: "Aina no Lovely Rock 'n' Roll" (lyrics, music)
- Ayano Ahane: "Lucky Goes On! -Shiawase ga Yui-" (music)
- Yuki Uchida (music, arrangement)
  - "Aishiteru"
  - "November"
  - "Da.i.su.ki."
  - "Uchida no Rock 'n' Roll"
- Yuka Onishi (music, arrangement)
  - "Hoshizora no Shita de"
  - "Drivin' Heart"
- Yōko Oginome: "Last Dance wa Watashi ni" (music)
- Otoha: "Kaigan Date" (music)
- Mai Kazahana & Hiroyuki Amano: "Watashi ga Suteta Mono" (music)
- Color
  - "Tsubasa ga Nakute mo" (lyrics, music)
  - "Stay with Me" (music)
  - "Chīsaki Shatachi" (music)
- Gorō Kishitani: "Ano Kane wo Narase" (music)
- KinKi Kids: "Father" (music)
- Shizuka Kudo: "Junk" (lyrics)
- Mariko Kouda (music, arrangement)
  - "Taiyō de Ikou"
  - "Tomodachi"
  - "Sayonara"
- Noriko Sakai (music)
  - "Photograph"
  - "15-Sai no Watashi e"
  - "Anata to Mita Sora"
- Kenji Sawada: "Polaroid Girl" (music)
- Chiyoko Shimakura: "Aishiterutte Iwasetai" (music, arrangement)
- Minami Takahashi: "Girls Talk" (lyrics, arrangement)
- Tube: "Shōnan Regret" (music)
- Takeshi Tsuruno: "Love Letter" (lyrics, music)
- Yohito Teraoka: "Last Scene" (music)
- Pearl Kyōdai: "To Candy" (music)
- Puffy: "Haru no Ashita" (lyrics, music)
- Peachy (Rika Ishii)
  - "Super Jet Shoes ~ Mirai wo Aruku Kutsu ~" (lyrics, music, arrangement)
  - "Kuishinbo Tengoku" (lyrics, music, arrangement)
  - "Show Paradise" (music, arrangement)
  - "Tiny Tiny X'mas" (lyrics, music, arrangement)
  - "Sweet Sweet Home" (lyrics, music, arrangement)
- Yo Hitoto: "Papa Mama" (music)
- Ryōko Hirosue: "It's My Idol" (lyrics, music)
- V6: "Tsubasa ni Nare" (lyrics, music)
- Eri Machimoto: "Venus Journey" (music)
- Moeko Matsushita: "Hello" (lyrics, music)
- Seiko Matsuda: "Precious Heart" (music)
- Rika Matsumoto: "Mizu no Naka no Tsuki" (music)
- Takumi Mitani & Daisuke Yokoyama: "Bokura no Uta" (lyrics, music)
- Alisa Mizuki
  - "Eden no Machi" (music, arrangement)
  - "Kaze wa Fuiteru" (music, arrangement)
  - "Watashi" (lyrics, music)
- Tomochika: "Chieko no Wink" (lyrics, music)
- Hiroko Moriguchi (music, arrangement)
  - "Speed"
  - "Mado Utsu Ame"
  - "Whistle"
  - "Sora kara no Tegami"
- Lagoon: "Rhapsody in White" (lyrics, music)
