= Goodbye =

Goodbye, Good bye, or Good-bye is a parting phrase and may refer to:

== Film ==
- Goodbye (1918 film), a British drama directed by Maurice Elvey
- Goodbye (1995 film) (Tot Ziens!), a Dutch film directed by Heddy Honigmann
- Goodbye (2004 film), a German short film nominated for a Prix UIP
- Goodbye (2008 film), a Japanese digital film screened at the 2008 Cairo International Film Festival
- Goodbye (2011 film), an Iranian film by Mohammad Rasoulof
- Goodbye (2022 film), an Indian Hindi-language film by Vikas Bahl

== Music ==
=== Albums ===
- Good Bye (Cali Gari album) or the title song, 2003
- Goodbye (Ben & Jason album), 2003
- Goodbye (Bobo Stenson album), 2005
- Goodbye (Cream album), 1969
- Goodbye (The Czars album) or the title song, 2004
- Goodbye (Dubstar album), 1997
- Goodbye (Gene Ammons album), 1974
- Goodbye (Milt Jackson album), 1973
- Goodbye (Ulrich Schnauss album) or the title song, 2007
- Goodbye: Enough Z'Nuff or the title song, by Donnie Vie, 2014
- Goodbye – The Greatest Hits, by JLS, 2013
- Goodbye, by Opiate for the Masses, 2003
- Goodbye, an EP by Seventh Avenue, 1999
- Goodbye, a re-release of I'm Good (Hahm Eun-jung EP), 2015

=== Songs ===
- "Good-Bye" (Sakanaction song), 2014
- "Good-Bye", by Jolin Tsai from 1019, 1999
- "Good-Bye", by So They Say from Antidote for Irony, 2006
- "Good-Bye!", written by Francesco Paolo Tosti, 1880
- "Good-Bye-Ee!", written by R. P. Weston and Bert Lee, 1917
- "Goodbye" (Air Supply song), 1993
- "Goodbye" (Alexia song), 1999
- "Goodbye" (Alma Čardžić song), 1997
- "Goodbye" (Army of Anyone song), 2006
- "Goodbye" (The Coral song), 2002
- "Goodbye" (The Corrs song), 2004
- "Goodbye" (Def Leppard song), 1999
- "Goodbye" (Feder song), featuring Lyse, 2015
- "Goodbye" (Gordon Jenkins song), first recorded by Benny Goodman, 1935; covered by many
- "Goodbye" (The Humans song), 2018
- "Goodbye" (Jason Derulo and David Guetta song), 2018
- "Goodbye" (Kate Ryan song), 2004
- "Goodbye" (Kristinia DeBarge song), 2009
- "Goodbye" (Mary Hopkin song), written by Paul McCartney, 1969
- "Goodbye" (Night Ranger song), 1985
- "Goodbye" (Shila Amzah song), 2015
- "Goodbye" (Slaughterhouse song), 2012
- "Goodbye" (Slipknot song), 2016
- "Goodbye" (Sneaky Sound System song), 2007
- "Goodbye" (Spice Girls song), 1998
- "Goodbye" (Tevin Campbell song), 1992
- "Goodbye (Astrid Goodbye)", by Cold Chisel, 1978
- "Goodbye (Shelter)", by Sanja Vučić, 2017
- "Goodbye", by 2NE1, 2017
- "Goodbye", by Alien Ant Farm from Truant, 2003
- "Goodbye", by AP2 from Suspension of Disbelief, 2000
- "Goodbye", by Au5, 2020
- "Goodbye", by Audio Adrenaline from Adios: The Greatest Hits, 2006
- "Goodbye", by Avril Lavigne from Goodbye Lullaby, 2011
- "Goodbye", by B.A.P from No Mercy, 2012
- "Goodbye", by Barry Ryan, 1968
- "Goodbye", by Best Coast from Crazy for You, 2010
- "Goodbye", by Billie Eilish from When We All Fall Asleep, Where Do We Go?, 2019
- "Goodbye", by Blacklite District
- "Goodbye", by Bleachers from Gone Now, 2017
- "Goodbye", by Bo Burnham from the special Bo Burnham: Inside, 2021
- "Goodbye", by Caliban from The Opposite from Within, 2004
- "Goodbye", by Celldweller from Celldweller, 2003 (2013 deluxe edition)
- "Goodbye", by the Chemical Brothers from For That Beautiful Feeling, 2023
- "Goodbye", by Claudia Emmanuela Santoso from the TV series The Voice of Germany, 2019
- "Goodbye", by Danger Danger from Dawn, 1995
- "Goodbye", by Dark New Day from Hail Mary, 2013
- "Goodbye", by Dave Gahan from Paper Monsters, 2003
- "Goodbye", by Default from Comes and Goes, 2009
- "Goodbye", by Depeche Mode from Delta Machine, 2014
- "Goodbye", by Earshot from Two, 2004
- "Goodbye", by Echosmith from Inside a Dream, 2017
- "Goodbye", by Eddie Vedder from Ukulele Songs, 2011
- "Goodbye", by Elton John from Madman Across the Water, 1971
- "Goodbye", by Everlast from Forever Everlasting, 1990
- "Goodbye", by Everlife from Everlife, 2007
- "Goodbye", by G.E.M. from Heartbeat, 2015
- "Goodbye", by George Baker Selection from Little Green Bag, 1970
- "Goodbye", by Girls' Generation from Mr.Mr., 2014
- "Goodbye", by Glenn Morrison, 2013
- "Goodbye", by Gravity Kills from Gravity Kills, 1996
- "Goodbye", by Hootie & The Blowfish from Cracked Rear View, 1994
- "Goodbye", by Inna (recording as Alessandra), 2008
- "Goodbye", by Iyaz from Replay, 2010
- "Goodbye", by Jagged Edge from Jagged Little Thrill, 2001
- "Goodbye", by The Luchagors from The Luchagors, 2007
- "Goodbye", by Labi Siffre from The Singer and the Song, 1971
- "Goodbye", by Limp Bizkit from Still Sucks, 2021
- "Goodbye", by Luna from Lunapark, 1992
- "Goodbye", by Marina from Ancient Dreams in a Modern Land, 2021
- "Goodbye", by Miley Cyrus from Breakout, 2008
- "Goodbye", by Mudvayne from The End of All Things to Come, 2002
- "Goodbye", by Natalie Imbruglia from White Lilies Island, 2001
- "Goodbye", by Neil Cicierega from Mouth Silence, 2014
- "Goodbye", by Ozzy Osbourne from Ordinary Man, 2020
- "Goodbye", by Park Hyo-shin, 2019
- "Goodbye", by Porches from The House, 2018
- "Goodbye", by The Pretenders, 1997
- "Goodbye", by the Psychedelic Furs from Forever Now, 1982
- "Goodbye", by Ramsey from Arcane League of Legends, 2021
- "Goodbye", by Red Flag from The Crypt, 2000
- "Goodbye", by Sabrina Carpenter from Man's Best Friend, 2025
- "Goodbye", by Sascha Schmitz from Open Water, 2006
- "Goodbye", by Secondhand Serenade from A Twist in My Story, 2008
- "Goodbye", by Seungmin from SKZ-Replay 2026 Pt.1, 2026
- "Goodbye", by Shed Seven from Let It Ride, 1998
- "Goodbye", by SR-71 from Tomorrow, 2002
- "Goodbye", by Stabbing Westward from Darkest Days, 1998
- "Goodbye", by Steve Earle from Train a Comin', 1995
- "Goodbye", by the Sundays from Blind, 1992
- "Goodbye", by Tracy Chapman from Let It Rain, 2002
- "Goodbye", by Vanessa Williams from The Comfort Zone, 1991
- "Goodbye", by Warmen from Japanese Hospitality, 2009
- "Goodbye", by Who Is Fancy, 2015
- "Goodbye", by Wiz Khalifa from Deal or No Deal, 2009
- "Goodbye?", by Grandaddy from Excerpts from the Diary of Todd Zilla, 2005
- "Goodbye (Kelly's Song)", by Alabama from Pass It On Down, 1990
- "Goodbye, Goodbye", by Oingo Boingo from the soundtrack to Fast Times at Ridgemont High, 1982
- "Goodbye Goodbye", by Brotherhood of Man from Higher Than High, 1979
- "Goodbye Goodbye", by Chips featuring Linda Martin, 1977
- "Goodbye Goodbye", by Tegan and Sara from Heartthrob, 2013
- "Goodbye Song", from Bear in the Big Blue House
- "Goodbye's (The Saddest Word)", by Celine Dion, 2002
- "Goodbyes" (James Cottriall song), 2010
- "Goodbyes" (Post Malone song), 2019
- "Goodbyes", by 3 Doors Down from The Greatest Hits, 2012
- "Goodbyes", by Jorja Smith from Lost & Found, 2018
- "Goodbyes", by Roam from Backbone, 2016
- "Hi-Ho"/"Good Bye", a single by hide, 1996

=== Other uses in music ===
- Goodbye: The Greatest Hits Tour, a 2013 tour by JLS

== Television episodes ==
- "Good-Bye" (Rescue Me)
- "Good-bye" (The Wonder Years)
- "Goodbye" (8 Simple Rules)
- "Goodbye" (Blossom)
- "Goodbye" (Fullmetal Alchemist)
- "Goodbye" (Glee)
- "Goodbye" (Grey's Anatomy)
- "Goodbye" (The Practice)
- "Goodbye" (The Bear)
- "Goodbyeee", an episode of Blackadder Goes Forth

== Other uses ==
- Good-Bye (manga), by Yoshihiro Tatsumi and published by Drawn and Quarterly
- The Goodbye Family, a Weird West series created by Lorin Morgan-Richards
- "Goodbye", a 2006 tour by Australian comedy team Lano and Woodley

== See also ==
- Auf Wiedersehen (disambiguation), German for "Goodbye"
- Bye (disambiguation)
- Bye Bye (disambiguation)
- Good Goodbye (disambiguation)
- Goodby (disambiguation)
- Goodbye Again (disambiguation)
- Goodbye Cruel World (disambiguation)
- Goodbye Girl (disambiguation)
- Goodbye to You (disambiguation)
- Never Can Say Goodbye (disambiguation)
- Never Say Goodbye (disambiguation)
