= Say Goodbye =

Say Goodbye may refer to:

== Film ==
- Say Goodbye (film), a 1971 American documentary film
- Say Good-bye, a UK film, winner of the 1990 BAFTA Award for Best Short Film

== Music ==
=== Albums ===
- Say Goodbye, by Shirley Kwan, 1989

=== Songs ===
- "Say Goodbye" (Beck song), 2014
- "Say Goodbye" (Bonnie Tyler song), 1994
- "Say Goodbye" (Cheap Trick song), 1997
- "Say Goodbye" (Chris Brown song), 2006
- "Say Goodbye" (Hunters & Collectors song), 1986
- "Say Goodbye" (Indecent Obsession song), 1989
- "Say Goodbye" (Krewella song), 2014
- "Say Goodbye" (La Cream song), 1999
- "Say Goodbye" (S Club song), 2003
- "Say Goodbye", by Ashlee Simpson from I Am Me, 2005
- "Say Goodbye", by Black Eyed Peas from Behind the Front, 1998
- "Say Goodbye", by Brooke Allison from Brooke Allison, 2001
- "Say Goodbye", by Chelsea Grin from Self Inflicted, 2016
- "Say Goodbye", by Dave Matthews Band from Crash, 1996
- "Say Goodbye", by Fleetwood Mac from Say You Will, 2003
- "Say Goodbye", by French Montana from Montana, 2019
- "Say Goodbye", by Gabrielle from Now and Always: 20 Years of Dreaming, 2013
- "Say Goodbye", by Gotthard from Homerun, 2001
- "Say Goodbye", by Green Day from Revolution Radio, 2016
- "Say Goodbye", by I Killed the Prom Queen from Music for the Recently Deceased, 2006
- "Say Goodbye", by Jay Chou from The Era, 2010
- "Say Goodbye", by Jordan Knight with Debbie Gibson, 2006
- "Say Goodbye", by Katharine McPhee from Unbroken, 2010
- "Say Goodbye", by Khan featuring Julee Cruise
- "Say Goodbye", by Krokus from Change of Address, 1986
- "Say Goodbye", by Mandisa from What If We Were Real, 2011
- "Say Goodbye", by Norah Jones from Little Broken Hearts, 2012
- "Say Goodbye", by Skillet from Comatose, 2006
- "Say Goodbye", by Theory of a Deadman from Gasoline, 2005
- "Say Goodbye", by Tom Chaplin from Twelve Tales of Christmas, 2017
- "Say Goodbye", by Uriah Heep from Outsider, 2014

== See also ==
- Goodbye (disambiguation)
- Never Say Goodbye (disambiguation)
