= Shirley Kwan discography =

- Shirley Kwan before her 2007 concert in Toronto
- Studio albums: 16
- Extended plays: 2
- Live albums: 3
- Compilation albums: 3
- Singles: 7

This is the discography of Hong Kong Cantopop singer Shirley Kwan, which includes releases in Hong Kong, Taiwan, China and Japan. It chronicles her transition from mainstream pop ballads in the late 1980s to more diversified musical styles in the '90s and beyond. By 1995, Kwan had established herself as one of the more avant-garde pop artists in Hong Kong. Many songs or albums do not have official English titles, and translations here may vary from those found in other sources.

== Studio albums ==
Release date	Title	Language
Hong Kong 1989-03-01; Japan 2025-07-13; South Korea 2025-10-25; United States 2025-10-25	冬戀 (Winter Love)	Cantonese
1989-11-01	難得有情人 (Happy Are Those in Love)	Cantonese
1989-11-21	Say Goodbye	Japanese
1990-05-22	真情 (True Love)	Cantonese
1990-07-21	Borderless	Japanese
1990-12-14	夜迷宮 (Lost in the Night)	Cantonese
1991-07-05	金色夏季 (Golden Summer)	Cantonese
1991-12-23	戀一世的愛 (Love Is Forever)	Cantonese
1992-07-17	製造迷夢 (Creating an Illusion)	Cantonese
1993-11-18	真假情話 (The Story of Shirley)	Cantonese
1994-04-13	難得有情人 (Happy are Those in Love)	Mandarin
1994-07-08	My Way	Cantonese
1995-02-28	'EX' All Time Favourites	Cantonese
1995-07-18	亂了 (Bewildered)	Mandarin
2001-12-03	冷火 (Freezing Flame)	Mandarin
Hong Kong 2009-06-16; United States 2025-10-25	Shirley's Era	Cantonese

== Extended plays ==
Release Date	Title	Notes
1994	夢劇場 (Dream Theatre)	Contains the "Rock version" of "Dream Theatre"
1998-01	eZONE	Contains material recorded in 1996.
2006-02	Shirley Kwan 關淑怡	AVCD containing music video of "About Me"

== Singles ==
Release Date	Title	Notes
1989-11	"Anata no Tameni" ("Because of You")	Japanese 3" CD single
1990-02	"Shirley Kwan Remix"	3" CD remix single
1990-07	ホノルル・シティ・ライツ ("Honolulu City Lights")	Japanese 3" CD single
1990-09	さよなら、こんにちわ ("Goodbye, Hello")	Japanese 3" CD single
1994-07	夜靠誰 ("Who Cares for Me in the Night")	
2009	"Initially"	3" promotional CD single; contains the Sa Ding Ding cover, "Alive" (Chillout remix)
2012-12	陀飛輪 ("Tourbillon")	Limited edition CD single (1000 copies)

== Compilations ==
Release Date	Title	Notes
1991-03-20	Montage	
1993-01-21	Montage II	Compilation with 2 new songs, "Dela" and "Obsession" (迷).
1995-06-13	世途上 新曲+精 (Journey of Life)	Compilation with 2 new songs, "He Needs You, She Needs You" (他需要你，她需要你) and "Are there Soulmates in Life" (人生可有知己).
1996-12	迷戀 關淑怡精選集 (Obsession)	Mandarin compilation
1997-04-10	心靈相通 新曲+精選 (Telepathic Connection)	Compilation with 4 previously unreleased songs recorded in 1995-96, "Dance in the Clouds" (雲上舞), "Infection" (傳染), "Moonlight Song" (月光曲 Fever Version), and "Mumbling" (自言自語). This version of "Mumbling" is different than the one previously released on the PolyGram compilation, Lucky Voice.

== Live albums ==
Release date	Title	Formats
1995-09	難得有一個關淑怡演唱會 (Shirley Kwan in Concert)	Released on CD/VCD/LD/DVD
2006-06	關於我 關淑怡演唱會 (Being Shirley on Stage)	Released on CD/VCD/DVD/UMD
2009-02	關淑怡演唱會2008 (Unexpected SHIRLEY KWAN)	Released on CD/VCD/DVD/UMD

== Other appearances ==
Year	Title	Notes
1990	一切是創造 ("Everything Is Created")	Duet with Hacken Lee. Released on Lee's album A Thousand and One Nights.
1991	明天你是否依然愛我 ("Will You Still Love Me Tomorrow?")	Duet with Alan Tam. Released on Tam's album Fairy Tales and Dreams.
1992	月下戀人 ("Lovers Under the Moon")	Duet with Alan Tam. Released on Tam's album Love Story.
1992	只想您會意 ("Only Want You to Realize")	Guest vocals on Hacken Lee track. Released on Lee's album of the same name.
1992	依然相愛 ("Still in Love")	Duet with Hacken Lee. Released on Lee's album, Only Want You to Realize.
1992	"So Sad"	Duet with Grasshopper. Released on the Grasshopper album Loving You Forever.
1993	熱力節拍Wou Bom Ba ("Summer Party")	Performed with Grasshopper, Karen Tong, and Winnie Lau. Released on the Marlborough Red Hot Hits compilation, Summer Party.
1993	容易受傷的女人 ("Fragile Woman")	Faye Wong cover. Released on the 2012 compilation, Reborn.
1993	瘋了 ("Crazy")	Sandy Lam cover. Released on the 2012 compilation, Reborn.
1993	"My Love"	Duet with Alan Tam. Released on Tam's album Look at Life with a Smile.
1994	單身一族 ("Singles Club")	Duet with Alan Tam. Released on Tam's album Favourite.
1995	為全世界歌唱 ("The World's Song")	Performed with PolyGram labelmates. Released on the compilation, The World's Song.
1995	月光曲 ("Moonlight Song")	Duet with Grasshopper. Released on the compilation, The World's Song.
1995	男人心 ("I Know Him So Well")	Duet with Vivian Chow. Released on Chow's album, A Bit More Love.
1995	請你入綺夢 ("Welcome to My Dream")	Theme song to the film, Romantic Dream. Released on the compilation, Lucky Voice.
1995	自言自語 ("Mumbling") [Video mix]	Different mix of the song as heard in the TVB music video, and not the version later found on Telepathic Connection. Released on the compilation, Lucky Voice.
1995	萬福瑪莉亞 ("Blessed Maria")	Duet with Anthony Wong.
1996	繾綣28800BPS ("Cuddling 28800BPS")	Released on the Tats Lau album, Anaesthesia.
1996	忘記他是她 ("Forget He Is She")	Tat Ming Pair cover. Released on the Tat Ming Pair Tribute album, We All Sing Tat Ming Pair.
2003	謊言 ("Lies")	Guest vocals on Eason Chan song. Released on Chan's album Live for Today.
2012	相濡以沫 ("To Each Other")	Theme song to the TVB series, The Confidant. Released digitally.
2012	鎖骨 ("Clavicle")	Duet with Juno Mak. Released on Mak's EP Paradoxically Yours.
2013	實屬巧合 ("Coincidence")	Theme song to the TVB series, Always and Ever. Released digitally.
2014	星斗群 ("Stars Club")	Duet with Mag Lam. Theme song to the TVB series, Never Dance Alone. Released digitally.
2014	偷情 ("Secret Affair") [Live])	Duet with Hins Cheung. Live cover of the song by Leslie Cheung. Released on Cheung's live album, Hins Live in Passion 2014.

== Unreleased songs ==
Year	Title	Notes
1993	"Vogue"	Madonna cover. Performed with Faye Wong and Sandy Lam. Recorded for the 30 Hour Famine event at the Hong Kong Coliseum in 1993.
1995	三張了 ("Turning 30")	Backing vocals on a track by CRHK radio personality Brian Leung Siu Fai. Originally recorded in the mid-90s for his radio program, but never surfaced until 2006.
1997	Cucurrucucu Paloma ("Song of the Dove")	Cover of the song by Caetano Veloso. Originally recorded for the 1997 film Happy Together but only later appeared on the 1999 making-of documentary, Buenos Aires Zero Degree.
