= Cruel World =

Cruel World may refer to:

- Cruel World (album), 2026 album by Holly Humberstone
  - "Cruel World" (song), the title track
- Cruel World Festival, American annual music festival
- Cruel World (film), 2005 American horror film
- "Cruel World", a song by Lana del Rey from Ultraviolence
- "Cruel World", a song by Phantogram from Three
- "Cruel World", a 2007 song by Seeb
- "Cruel World", a song with versions by Willie Nelson and Josh Homme from The Music of Red Dead Redemption 2 (Original Soundtrack)

== See also ==
- A Cruel World, 2005 album by Bloodsimple
- Cruel Cruel World, 2005 album by Prozzäk
- Goodbye Cruel World (disambiguation)
- Hello Cruel World (disambiguation)
