= Forget Him =

Forget Him may refer to:

- "Forget Him" (Bobby Rydell song), 1963
- "Forget Him" (Teresa Teng song), 1980
- Forget Him, a 1993 album by Jacky Cheung
  - "Forget Him", a 1993 song by Jacky Cheung
