= Brian Leung =

Brian Leung may refer to:

- Brian Leung Kai-ping, a Hong Kong activist who removed his mask during the storming of the Hong Kong Legislative Council Complex on the night of 1–2 July 2019
- Brian Leung Siu Fai (born 1964), Hong Kong radio disc jockey and presenter
- Brian Leung Hung Tak, chairperson of Hong Kong Football Association
- Brian Leung (author), American writer
