= Never Can Say Goodbye (disambiguation) =

"Never Can Say Goodbye" is a song written by Clifton Davis and originally recorded by The Jackson 5.

Never Can Say Goodbye may also refer to:

- Never Can Say Goodbye (Gloria Gaynor album), a 1975 album by Gloria Gaynor
- Never Can Say Goodbye: The Music of Michael Jackson, a 2010 album by American jazz organist Joey DeFrancesco
- "Never Can Say Goodbye", a song by James Brown from the album There It Is

== See also ==
- Never Say Goodbye (disambiguation)
