= Bye =

Bye or BYE may refer to:

- Bye, a colloquial valediction in English

== Songs ==
- "Bye" (Ariana Grande song), 2024
- "Bye" (Peso Pluma song), 2023
- "Bye", by Elliott Smith from Figure 8, 2000
- "Bye", by Jaden Smith from Trippy Summer, 2021

== Sport ==
- Bye (cricket), a type of run
- Bye (sports), a round advancement without playing

== Other uses ==
- Bye (film), a 2019 Spanish drama
- Bye (surname), list of people named Bye
- Belarus (UNDP code: BYE)

== See also ==
- Bye Bye (disambiguation)
- Bye Bye Bye (disambiguation)
- Goodbye (disambiguation)
- Parting phrase
