= Bye Bye Bye (disambiguation) =

"Bye Bye Bye" is a 2000 song by NSYNC.

Bye Bye Bye may refer to:

- "Bye Bye Bye!", 2009 song by C-ute
- "Bye, Bye, Bye", a song by Jellyfish from Spilt Milk
- "Bye Bye Bye", a song by WEi
- "Bye Bye Bye", a song by Teya and Salena

== See also ==
- Bye Bye (disambiguation)
- Bye (disambiguation)
