= Goodby =

Goodby is a surname. Notable people with the surname include:

- James Goodby (born 1929), American author and diplomat
- Jeff Goodby, American advertising executive
- John Goodby, British materials chemist

== See also ==
- Goodbye, a parting phrase
- Goodbye (disambiguation)
