= Fallen Angels (1995 film) =

1995 Hong Kong film by Wong Kar-wai

- Hong Kong theatrical poster

Chinese name
- Traditional Chinese: 墮落天使
- Simplified Chinese: 堕落天使
- Literal meaning: Fallen angels
Transcriptions
Standard Mandarin
- Hanyu Pinyin: Duòluò tiānshǐ
Yue: Cantonese
- Jyutping: Do6 Lok6 Tin1 Si2
- Directed by: Wong Kar-wai
- Written by: Wong Kar-wai
- Produced by: Jeffrey Lau
- Starring: Leon Lai; Michele Reis; Takeshi Kaneshiro; Charlie Yeung; Karen Mok
- Cinematography: Christopher Doyle
- Edited by: William Chang; Wong Ming-lam
- Music by: Roel A. Garcia; Frankie Chan
- Production company: Jet Tone Productions
- Distributed by: Kino International
- Release date: 6 September 1995
- Running time: 99 minutes
- Country: British Hong Kong
- Languages: Cantonese; Mandarin
- Box office: HK$7.5 million (Hong Kong); US$0.2 million (US)

Fallen Angels is a 1995 Hong Kong neo-noir crime comedy-drama film written and directed by Wong Kar-wai. It features two intertwined storylines—one tells the story of a hitman wishing to leave the criminal underworld (Leon Lai), the eccentric woman he starts a relationship with (Karen Mok), and his agent that remains unnamed throughout the movie (Michele Reis), who is infatuated with him. The other story is of a mute ex-convict on the run from the police (Takeshi Kaneshiro) and a mentally unstable woman dumped by her boyfriend (Charlie Yeung). Set in 1995 pre-Handover Hong Kong, Fallen Angels explores the characters' loneliness, their alienation from the situations around them, and yearning for connections in a hectic city.

Wong initially wrote Fallen Angels as the third story of his preceding film, Chungking Express (1994), but split them into two separate projects due to their cumulative length, and thus it acts not as a sequel but as a separate chapter. Similar to Chungking Express, Fallen Angels features a fragmented narrative that emphasises mood and atmosphere over structure. Whereas its predecessor incorporates bright daytime colours, Fallen Angels consists of scenes exclusively shot at night and using darker colours alongside bright neons. Wong considered the two movies to be complementary counterparts exploring contemporary Hong Kong. Cinematographer Christopher Doyle extensively used wide-angle lens to distort the characters' faces on the screen, conveying their isolation from the surrounding world. Doyle also creates distorted tension in scenes of extreme violence with frantic, out-of-focus visuals. The soundtrack extensively uses trip hop and pop songs to convey mood and maintain an "urban environment" that plays with popular culture.

Fallen Angels was released in September 1995. Upon release, critics commented that its styles resembled those deployed in Chungking Express; many lamented that Wong had become self-indulgent, though as time went on critics began to be more appreciative of the film. At the 15th Hong Kong Film Awards in 1996, it won three awards: Best Supporting Actress for Mok, Best Cinematography for Doyle, and Best Original Score for Roel A. Garcia and Frankie Chan. Retrospectively, critics commented that though Fallen Angels was not as groundbreaking as its predecessor, it remained one of Wong's most captivating films, cementing his trademark styles. The film's abstract, unconventional style, the context in which it was made, and its use of pastiche and intertextuality with regard to both popular culture and its predecessor Chungking Express have led to the movie being described as a postmodern film and as suggesting a postmodern reading.

Since its release, Fallen Angels has been frequently cited as one of Wong's best films and one of the greatest films of the 1990s. The film has encompassed a large cult following, and is notable for being the last film Wong fully shot in his native Hong Kong before embarking on more ambitious international productions.

== Plot ==
Hitman Wong Chi-ming talks to a woman, whom he refers to as his "partner". The story begins after Wong responds to her question on whether they are still partners.

The pair have never met despite having been business partners for nearly three years; instead they exchange plans via letters and faxes. The partner cleans the hitman's cramped apartment, buys his groceries, and sends him blueprints of assassination locations. Becoming increasingly obsessed with his mysterious nature, she visits a bar Wong frequents and daydreams about him, after which she goes to his apartment and masturbates to the thought of him.

Wong carries out a successful hit but is shot in the arm in the process. Increasingly frustrated by the monotone life of contract killing and lack of free will, he decides to quit. He sets up a meeting with his partner but no-shows. Certain that she will come looking for him at his favourite bar, he asks the bartender to suggest "Forget Him" on the jukebox when she arrives. After listening to the song, the partner returns to his apartment, where she masturbates until she breaks down crying. Meanwhile, Wong encounters an eccentric woman nicknamed "Blondie" at a McDonald's, who invites him to her apartment. She believes Wong is the ex-lover who left her for another woman.

Wong ultimately decides to meet his partner in person and informs her that he wishes to terminate their partnership. She asks him to do one more job, which he agrees. Afterwards, Wong breaks off his relationship with Blondie, leaving her heartbroken. She bites him in the arm to leave her mark on him. The hitman sets out for his final job, while the partner makes a phone call that gives him away. Wong eventually dies in the showdown, though he is pleased that he has finally been able to achieve free will by making his own decisions and dying.

The chaotic Chungking Mansions, where the hitman's partner lives, is also home to Ho Chi-mo, a mute ex-convict who lives with his father. For work, he breaks into other people's businesses at night and sells their goods and services, often forcibly to unwilling customers. He frequently runs into a woman named Charlie, who cries on his shoulder and tells him the same sob story of her ex-boyfriend Johnny leaving her for a girl named Blondie. Ho falls for her but she ultimately stands him up, after which he changes his ways, beginning a friendship and work relationship with a restaurant manager and starting to film things around him with a video camera. His father passes away, and Ho watches the video filmed to remember him. He eventually runs into Charlie while masquerading as a business owner. She is now a stewardess in a new relationship, and does not acknowledge him.

Some time later, the partner visits a restaurant, admitting that she has become more cautious and detached following Wong's death. Nearby, Ho is beaten up by a local gang. Seeing this, she realises that he is feeling the same sense of loss as her. They go for a ride on Ho's motorbike. He states that he feels a spark even though they will never be friends or confidants, while she comments that she has not been close to anyone in a while, and even though it is temporary, she enjoys the warmth he brings in the moment.

== Cast ==
- Leon Lai as Wong Chi-ming, the hitman
- Michele Reis as the hitman's "partner"
- Takeshi Kaneshiro as Ho Chi-mo, the mute ex-convict (He Zhiwu in Mandarin)
- Charlie Yeung as Charlie, a mysterious girl that Chi-mo frequently runs into
- Karen Mok as Situ Hui-Ling, known as "Blondie"
- Chan Fai-hung as the man forced to eat ice cream
- Chan Man-lei as Ho Chi-mo's father
- Toru Saito as Sato, the Japanese restaurant owner
- Benz Kong as Ah-Hoi, the hitman's childhood classmate

== Development and production ==
Originally conceived by Wong as the third story for 1994's Chungking Express involving a lovesick hitman, it was cut after he decided that it was complete without it, and that the tone of the more demented content was not suited for the more light-hearted Chungking Express. Wong Kar-wai also explained that he had so much pleasure in making the first story of Chungking Express that he felt he had made the film too long, and so he decided to skip the third story in releasing Chungking Express. After the release of Chungking Express, Wong noted that the story of a lovesick hitman still interested him, and so he decided to develop it into Fallen Angels. Wong also decided to "gender-reverse" the attributes of the roles in his new film, with the gun-wielding attributes of Brigitte Lin in Chungking Express being manifested in the hitman Leon Lai would play, while the sneaking-in of Faye Wong in Chungking Express to other apartments was reversed by Takeshi Kaneshiro's character sneaking into shops and businesses in Fallen Angels.

He instead decided to develop the story further into its own feature film and borrowed elements of Chungking Express, such as themes, locations and methods of filming. Wanting to also try to differentiate it from Chungking and to try something new, Wong decided along with cinematographer Christopher Doyle to shoot mainly at night and using extreme wide-angle lenses, keeping the camera as close to the talents as possible to give a detached effect from the world around them.

Many of the plot devices are related to those deployed in its predecessor Chungking Express. The wide-angle distortion of images creates an effect of distance-in-proximity, conveying the characters' solitude. The visuals are frantic, out-of-focus, and neon-lit. Rather than relying on dialogues, the story is narrated through characters' voiceovers. The film's use of pop songs has also received extensive commentary. Fallen Angels utilizes a non-linear plot structure that alternates between two loosely connected storylines. The film frequently shifts between characters and emphasizes emotion and atmosphere over a traditional linear narrative.

There is also the use of different film stocks throughout the film and also a number of scenes where the film switches to black and white inserts covered in a grainy 'noise' effect. There is also a constant sense of Doyle's camera being present that is never disguised, with meticulous use of hand-held camera movement in the film. This 'follows' the characters as they move through a scene. The film also makes use of "claustrophobic" shots involving fast and slow camera movements in a frenetic pace interpolated within crowded, chaotic locations in Hong Kong. The film's colours are also distorted, with a distinctive green filter reminiscent of 1990s grunge aesthetics.

A particularly heavy theme of Fallen Angels is the city itself, with "bedazzling shots" of sites associated with 1990s Hong Kong such as neon-lit billboards and now-closed Kai Tak Airport, as well as the city's visual landscape and 1990s uncertainty and anxieties present in its population at the time because of the looming handover of Hong Kong to China overwhelming the mood and feel of the film. Fallen Angels as such has been described as a "time capsule" of Hong Kong's mid-to-late-20th-century cultural golden age before its handover to China in 1997. Wong himself stated that the movie's main character is the "city itself".

In an interview, Wong had this to say:

...To me, Chungking Express and Fallen Angels are one film that should be three hours long. I always think these two films should be seen together as a double bill. In fact, people asked me during an interview for Chungking Express: "You've made these two stories which have no relationship at all to each other, how can you connect them?" And I said, 'The main characters of Chungking Express are not Faye Wong or Takeshi Kaneshiro, but the city itself, the night and day of Hong Kong. Chungking Express and Fallen Angels together are the bright and dark of Hong Kong." I see the films as inter-reversible, the character of Faye Wong could be the character of Takeshi in Fallen Angels; Brigitte Lin in Chungking could be Leon Lai in Fallen Angels. All of their characters are inter-reversible. Also, in Chungking we were shooting from a very long distance with long lenses, but the characters seem close to us.

== Soundtrack ==
Typical for a Wong Kar-wai film, Fallen Angels extensively uses pop songs, featuring a largely trip hop soundtrack that appealed to the widespread popularity of trip hop in 1994–1995. Wong Kar-wai initially wished to use the music of English trip hop band Massive Attack but discovered it was too expensive, and so asked his composer in Hong Kong (Frankie Chan) to compose something similar in style. As such, one track that is played prominently throughout the film is "Because I'm Cool" by Nogabe "Robinson" Randriaharimalala. It is a re-orchestration of "Karmacoma" by Massive Attack, and samples the song.

Also featured in the Fallen Angels soundtrack is a dream pop version of "Forget Him" sung by Shirley Kwan, a reworking of the original by Teresa Teng, and one of the very few "contemporary" Cantopop songs ever used by Wong Kar-wai in his films. In the film, the song is used by the hitman to indirectly communicate the message to his assistant that he wants her to "forget him", and is also used in the scenes afterwards in the McDonald's restaurant, where it plays over the restaurant's speakers as the hitman and Blondie encounter each other, a scene juxtaposed by the misery and sadness of the assistant crying.

In contrast to Wong's other films such as Chungking Express, Fallen Angels' soundtrack displays more 'ethereal pieces', featuring the 1994 avant-garde/experimental ambient piece "Speak My Language" by American avant-garde artist Laurie Anderson. The song is used in scenes where the hitman's assistant visits the bar that the hitman frequents and masturbates in his room out of sexual frustration. The song, a moody track speaking of the living and the dead, is emblematic of the film's highly bleak outlook. In the ending scene, the Flying Pickets version of "Only You" is used, described as the only track in the film to express hopefulness, as the hitman's assistant and the ex-convict find a chance to escape from the film's seemingly perpetual night, and as they end the film seeking emotional redemption in their shared loss and the sunrise that emerges over the Hong Kong skyline. The film's official soundtrack was originally released on CD in 1995 but has since been occasionally re-released.

== Critical reception ==
Fallen Angels was released in September 1995, premiering at the 1995 Toronto International Film Festival, where it received considerable critical success and became the focus of the festival for its notable visual style.

In the Chicago Sun-Times, Roger Ebert gave Fallen Angels three stars out of a possible four. Ebert stated the film appealed to a niche audience including art students, "the kinds of people you see in the Japanese animation section of the video store, with their sleeves cut off so you can see their tattoos", and "those who subscribe to more than three film magazines", but would prove unsuitable for an average moviegoer. Stephen Holden of The New York Times said the film relied more on style than substance and wrote: "Although the story takes a tragic turn, the movie feels as weightless as the tinny pop music that keeps its restless midnight ramblers darting around the city like electronic toy figures in a gaming arcade."

In the Village Voice, J. Hoberman wrote:

The acme of neo-new-wavism, the ultimate in MTV alienation, the most visually voluptuous flick of the fin de siècle, a pyrotechnical wonder about mystery, solitude, and the irrational love of movies that pushes Wong's style to the brink of self-parody.

Hoberman and Amy Taubin both placed Fallen Angels on their lists for the top 10 films of the decade, and the Village Voice's decade-end critics poll placed Fallen Angels at No. 10, the highest-ranking of any Wong Kar-wai film.

Rotten Tomatoes reported that 95% of critics have given the film a positive review based on 22 reviews, with an average rating of 7.90/10. Critic Roger Ebert of the Chicago Sun-Times wrote that he "felt transported back to the 1960s films of Jean-Luc Godard" and praised Fallen Angels as "a film that was not afraid of its audience." Edward Guthmann of the San Francisco Chronicle described Wong as bringing "tremendous vigor and audacity to the effort, asking us to question the most basic rules of storytelling and commercial filmmaking." Kevin Thomas of the Los Angeles Times called it "an exhilarating rush of a movie, with all manner of go-for-broke visual bravura that expresses perfectly the free spirits of [Wong's] bold young people."

On Metacritic, the film has a weighted average score of 71 out of 100 based on 13 critic reviews, indicating "generally favorable reviews". Reviews on the site highlighted the film's distinctive visual style and unconventional storytelling. TV Guide praised its "extraordinary emotional depth," while Lisa Alspector of the Chicago Reader wrote that Wong "makes these five self-consciously idiosyncratic types—often seen through distorting lenses in cinematographer Christopher Doyle's somber, garish Hong Kong—fully and instantly believable." Kevin Thomas of the Los Angeles Times called it "an exhilarating rush of a movie, with all manner of go-for-broke visual bravura that expresses perfectly the free spirits of his bold young people."

Critics have described the film's structure as intentionally fragmented: the San Francisco Chronicle called it “an experiment in anti-narrative,” noting that Wong “interweaves [the characters’] stories so casually that his story, for what it's worth, always stays beyond our grasp.” Similarly, Jude D. Russo of The Harvard Crimson wrote that the film's “two storylines intersect occasionally throughout the film...but remain fundamentally separate through most of the film, reflecting the isolation at the movie's heart.”

Author Stephen Teo, in the book Wong Kar-wai: Auteur of Time, considered Fallen Angels Wong's most social and political film. Meanwhile, Peter Brunette stated the nonlinear structure and "anti-realist, hyperstylized" cinematography of Fallen Angels and its predecessor Chungking Express pointed towards the future of cinema. Scholars Justin Clemens and Dominic Pettman commented on the social and political undertones of Fallen Angels: by portraying the characters' loneliness, alienation and indecisiveness, the film represents a metaphor for the political climate of contemporary Hong Kong, the impending end of British rule and transition to Chinese rule in 1997. Film critic Thorsten Botz-Bornstein highlighted Fallen Angels as a film that represented Wong's peculiar appeal to both traditional "Eastern" and "Western" audiences—it portrays Hong Kong with "post-colonial modernity" showcased through crammed apartments, public transportation, noodle parlors that were emblematic of modern Asia's consumerism. On the one hand, those elements could not be rightfully called "traditionally Asian"; on the other, Western audience viewed such elements with astounding curiosity.

== Box office ==
The film made HK$7,476,025 during its Hong Kong run.

On 21 January 1998, the film began a limited North American theatrical run through Kino International. Playing solely at Film Forum in New York City, the film grossed US$13,804 in its opening weekend. The final North American theatrical gross was US$163,145.

In 2004, Australian distribution company Accent Film Entertainment released a remastered widescreen version of the film enhanced for 16x9 screens.

== Home media and streaming ==
Kino International, who initially distributed the film on DVD, prepared a re-release of the film from a new high-definition transfer on 11 November 2008. Kino released the film on Blu-ray in America on 26 March 2010. It has since gone out of print.

The film was picked up by the Criterion Collection and given a new Blu-ray release on 23 March 2021 in a collection of 7 Wong Kar-wai films.

Also, Fallen Angels could previously be streamed on FilmStruck (shut down in 2018) and is currently available on The Criterion Collection subscription service channel. In May 2019, Wong Kar Wai announced that all of his films would be remastered by his production studio, Jet Tone Productions, and be distributed in the United States through Janus Films and the Criterion Collection. It was released in the UK on DVD and Blu-ray by Artificial Eye.

== Awards and nominations ==
Awards and nominations
Ceremony	Category	Recipient	Outcome
15th Hong Kong Film Awards	Best Film	Fallen Angels	Nominated
15th Hong Kong Film Awards	Best Director	Wong Kar-wai	Nominated
15th Hong Kong Film Awards	Best Supporting Actress	Karen Mok	Won
15th Hong Kong Film Awards	Best New Performer	Chan Man-lei	Nominated
15th Hong Kong Film Awards	Best Cinematography	Christopher Doyle	Won
15th Hong Kong Film Awards	Best Film Editing	William Chang, Wong Ming-lam	Nominated
15th Hong Kong Film Awards	Best Art Direction	William Chang	Nominated
15th Hong Kong Film Awards	Best Costume and Make-up Design	William Chang	Nominated
15th Hong Kong Film Awards	Best Original Score	Frankie Chan, Roel A. Garcia	Won
32nd Golden Horse Awards	Best Film Editing	William Chang, Wong Ming-lam	Won
32nd Golden Horse Awards	Best Art Direction	William Chang	Nominated
32nd Golden Horse Awards	Best Cinematography	Christopher Doyle	Nominated
32nd Golden Horse Awards	Best Original Film Score	Frankie Chan	Nominated
2nd Hong Kong Film Critics Society Awards	Film of Merit	Fallen Angels	Won
1st Golden Bauhinia Awards	Best Film	Fallen Angels	Nominated
1st Golden Bauhinia Awards	Best Actor	Takeshi Kaneshiro	Nominated
1st Golden Bauhinia Awards	Best Actress	Michele Reis	Nominated
1st Golden Bauhinia Awards	Best Supporting Actor	Chan Fai-hung	Nominated
1st Golden Bauhinia Awards	Best Supporting Actress	Karen Mok	Won
1st Golden Bauhinia Awards	Best Supporting Actress	Charlie Yeung	Nominated
1st Golden Bauhinia Awards	Best Cinematography	Christopher Doyle	Won
1st Golden Bauhinia Awards	Omega's Most Creative Award	Fallen Angels	Nominated

== See also ==
- Cinema of Hong Kong
- Hong Kong in films
- List of Hong Kong films
