= Forget Him (Teresa Teng song) =

Single by Teresa Teng

from the album Irreconcilable
- Language: Cantonese
- Released: December 18, 1980
- Genre: Pop
- Length: 2:52
- Label: Polygram
- Songwriter: James Wong
- Producer: James Wong

"Forget Him" (Chinese: 忘記他; Jyutping: Mong4 gei3 taa1) is a song recorded in Cantonese by Taiwanese singer Teresa Teng. It was released through Polygram Records Hong Kong on December 18, 1980, as part of her first Cantonese album, Irreconcilable (勢不兩立; Sai Bat Leung Laap). The song was written by Hong Kong media personality James Wong.

== Composition and lyrics ==
"Forget Him" is composed in the key of C minor, with a structure of prelude - A1 - A2 - B - interlude - A3 - epilogue, and features flute, string, and mandolin instruments. Yu Shaohua, a former professor of the Department of Music at the Chinese University of Hong Kong, noted that the string instrumentals contains a strong influence from Japanese enka music, contrasting with typical Cantonese songs by local Hong Kong singers.

Some commentators described song's lyrics as "infatuated" and noted that it doesn't emphasize the tension between forgetting and not being able to forget. The words are simple and plain, characteristic of a typical James Wong piece. Lyricist Zheng Guojiang expressed his fondness for these lyrics, particularly appreciating the line "Only he can make me appreciate myself," believing it reflects a deep romantic experience. James Wong commented that the character "和" in the lyric represents a piece of literal sand and gravel, a result of the record industry's rush to complete the work. Lyricist Chu Yiu-wai added that this issue arose from adapting the lyrics to the music.

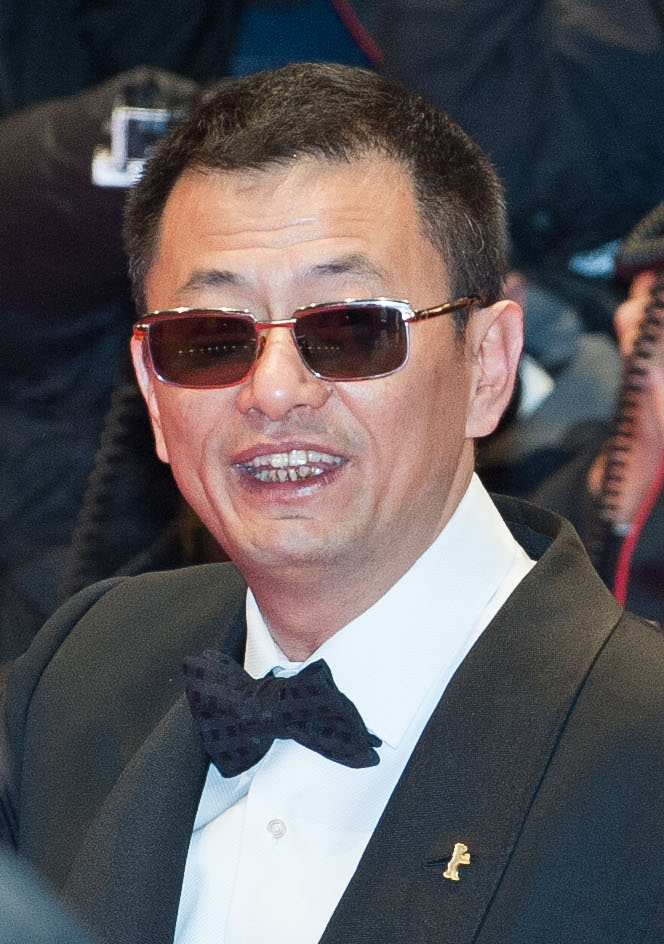
A dream pop rendition of the song, sung by Shirley Kwan, was featured in Wong Kar-wai's Fallen Angels (1995).

Cultural critic Edward Lam remarked that while the album's title song is "Wind and Frost Accompany Me," the theme song of the TV series Irreconcilable, its "sense of struggle" contrasts with Teng's typically gentle image, making "Forget Him" stand out.

== Music video ==
Teng shot two music videos for "Forget Him"—one filmed during Teng's appearance on the program Happy Tonight in late 1980, and another segment from the TVB program Teresa Teng Special in October 1982.

== Reception ==
The song was well received in Hong Kong upon its release, and its parent album Sai Bat Leung Laap receiving a platinum certification by the International Federation of the Phonographic Industry Hong Kong (IFPIHK) in 1981.

== Covers ==
Fifteen years later, the song was covered by Shirley Kwan, as part of her 1995 tribute album 'EX' All Time Favourites. This new dream pop version was featured in Wong Kar-wai's art house movie Fallen Angels (1995) as the Jukebox song number "1818." As the title suggested, the hitman played by Leon Lai wanted his accomplice, Michelle Reis, to forget him.
