= Goodbye Girl =

The Goodbye Girl is a 1977 film starring Richard Dreyfuss and Marsha Mason.

The Goodbye Girl or Goodbye Girl may also refer to:

- The Goodbye Girl (musical), a 1993 Broadway musical based on the film
- Goodbye Girl (David Gates album)
  - "Goodbye Girl" (song), the title song, and the theme song from the 1977 film, later covered by Hootie & the Blowfish
- The Goodbye Girl (album), a 2004 album by Epicure
- Goodbye Girl (Miyuki Nakajima album)
- "Goodbye Girl" (Go West song)
- "Goodbye Girl" (Squeeze song)
- "The Goodbye Girl" (The O.C.), an episode of The O.C.
- The Goodbye Girl (2004 film)
