= Bye Bye =

Bye Bye may refer to:

== Music ==
=== Albums ===
- Bye Bye (album), by Annalisa, 2018
- Bye Bye, by Trio, 1983

=== Songs ===
- "Bye Bye" (Ai Otsuka song), 2009
- "Bye Bye" (Annalisa song), 2018
- "Bye-Bye" (Ayumi Hamasaki song), 2024
- "Bye Bye" (Beni song), 2010
- "Bye, Bye" (Elena Risteska song), 2008
- "Bye Bye" (Henry Mancini song), 1967
- "Bye Bye" (Jo Dee Messina song), 1998
- "Bye Bye" (Mariah Carey song), 2008
- "Bye Bye" (Marshmello and Juice Wrld song), 2022
- "Bye Bye" (Miliyah Kato song), 2010
- "Bye Bye." (Nanase Aikawa song), 1996
- "Bye Bye", by Alejandra Guzmán from Indeleble, 2006
- "Bye Bye", by Belanova from Fantasía Pop, 2007
- "Bye Bye", by Capital Bra from CB6, 2019
- "Bye Bye", by David Civera, 2002
- "Bye Bye", by Future from Purple Reign, 2016
- "Bye Bye", by Gryffin from Gravity, 2019
- "Bye Bye", by Marcy Playground, 1999
- "Bye Bye", by Mozart La Para, 2017
- "Bye Bye", by Safia from Internal, 2016
- "Bye Bye", from the Mufasa: The Lion King film soundtrack, 2024

== Other media ==
- Bye-Bye (film), a 1995 French drama
- Bye Bye (TV series), a Québécois New Year's Eve sketch-comedy special
- Bye-Bye (novel), a 1997 novel by Jane Ransom

== See also ==
- Bye Bye Bye (disambiguation)
- Bye (disambiguation)
