= Park Hyo-shin discography =

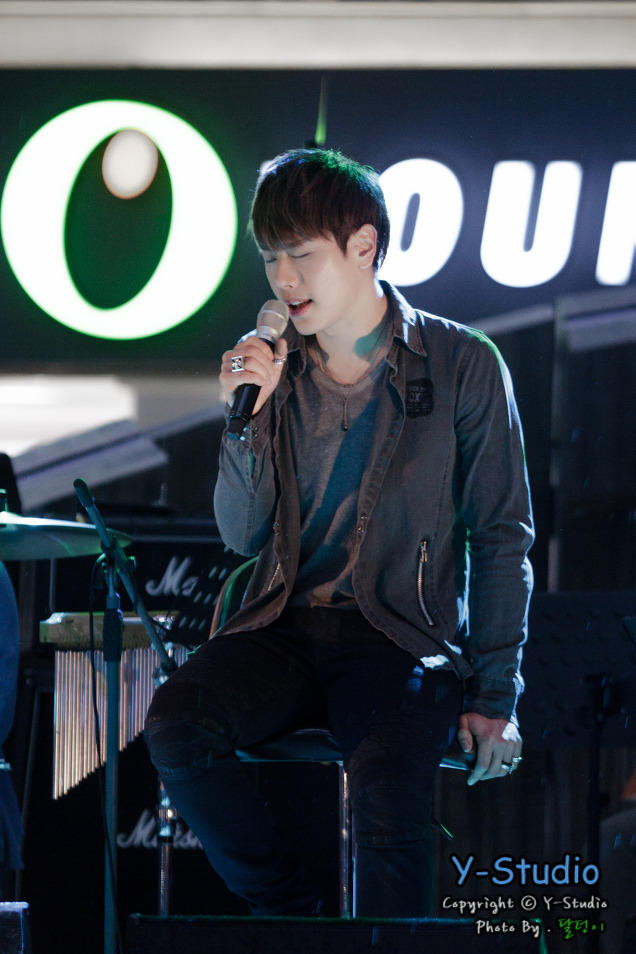
- Studio albums: 7
- Live albums: 1
- Compilation albums: 3
- Tribute albums: 1
- Singles: 23
- Music videos: 32

South Korean singer Park Hyo-shin has released seven studio albums, one live album, three compilation albums, one cover album, and twenty singles.

== Albums ==
=== Studio albums ===
Title	Album details	Peak chart positions		Sales
Title	Album details	KOR RIAK (Note: The Recording Industry Association of Korea monthly chart was discontinued in 2008.)	KOR Gaon (Note: The Gaon Album Chart was established in 2010.)	Sales
Things I Can't Do for You (해줄 수 없는 일)	Released: January 24, 2000; Label: Shinchon Music; Format: CD, cassette, digital download	14	34	KOR: 446,943
Second Story	Released: January 19, 2001; Label: Shinchon Music; Format: CD, cassette, digital download	5	32	KOR: 375,798
Time Honored Voice	Released: September 13, 2002; Label: Shinchon Music; Format: CD, cassette, digital download	2	27	KOR: 479,717
Soul Tree	Released: April 19, 2004; Label: T Entertainment; Format: CD, cassette, digital download	1	—	KOR: 168,055
The Breeze of Sea	Released: January 29, 2007; Label: Nawon Entertainment, T Entertainment; Format: CD, cassette, digital download	3	—	KOR: 61,800
Gift	Part 1: Released: September 15, 2009; Label: Jellyfish Entertainment, Mnet Media; Format: CD, digital download	—N/a	11	KOR: 57,027
Gift	Part 2: Released: December 13, 2010; Label: Jellyfish Entertainment, Mnet Media; Format: CD, digital download	—N/a	1	KOR: 57,027
I Am a Dreamer	Released: October 3, 2016; Label: Glove Entertainment, LOEN Entertainment; Format: CD, digital download	—N/a	3	KOR: 46,583
"—" denotes releases that did not chart.

=== Live albums ===
Title	Album details
Next Destination...New York	Released: December 22, 2005; Label: Shinchon Music; Format: CD+DVD, digital download

=== Compilation albums ===
Title	Album details	Peak chart positions		Sales
Title	Album details	KOR RIAK	KOR Gaon	Sales
Park Hyo Shin Best Voice = 2003-1999	Released: October 30, 2003; Label: Shinchon Music; Format: CD, cassette, digital download	18	—	KOR: 32,608
The Gold	Released: April 20, 2009; Label: Shinchon Music; Format: CD, digital download	—N/a	96	
Gift E.C.H.O	Released: March 22, 2012; Label: Jellyfish Entertainment; Format: CD, digital download	—N/a	7	KOR: 11,409
"—" denotes releases that did not chart.

=== Cover albums ===
Title	Album details	Peak chart positions	Sales
Title	Album details	KOR RIAK	Sales
Neo Classicism	Released: June 2, 2005; Label: T Entertainment; Format: CD, cassette, digital download	7	KOR: 53,960

== Singles ==
=== As lead artist ===
Title	Year	Peak chart positions	Sales	Album
Title	Year	KOR	Sales	Album
"Things I Can't Do for You" (해줄 수 없는 일)	1999	—		Things I Can't Do for You
"Fool" (바보)	1999	—		Things I Can't Do for You
"Far Away" (먼곳에서)	2001	—		Second Story
"Good Person" (좋은사람)	2002	—		Time-Honored Voice
"Standing There" (그 곳에 서서)	2004	—		Soul Tree
"Scattered Days" (흩어진 나날들)	2005	—		Neo Classicism
"Memories Resembles Love" (추억은 사랑을 닮아)	2007	—		The Breeze of Sea
"The Castle of Zoltar"	2008	—		Hwang Project Vol.1 – Welcome to the Fantastic World
"After Love" (사랑한 후에)	2009	—		Gift – Part 1
"Goodbye Love" (안녕 사랑아)	2010	9		Gift – Part 2
"I Promise You" (사랑이 고프다)	2010	5		Gift – Part 2
"Overcoming Myself" (나를 넘는다)	2012	—		Non-album singles
"Wild Flower" (야생화)	2014	1	KOR: 5,000,000	Non-album singles
"Happy Together"	2014	1	KOR: 870,433	Non-album singles
"Shine Your Light"	2015	2	KOR: 530,148	Non-album singles
"Breath" (숨)	2016	1	KOR: 1,752,715+	I Am a Dreamer
"Home"	2016	6	KOR: 303,095+	I Am a Dreamer
"Beautiful Tomorrow"	2016	7	KOR: 268,483+	I Am a Dreamer
"Sound of Winter" (겨울소리)	2018	1	—N/a	Non-album singles
"The Other Day" (별 시(別 時))	2018	5	—N/a	Non-album singles
"The Wind Is Blowing" (바람이 부네요)	2019	41	—N/a	Non-album singles
"Goodbye" (굿바이)	2019	1	—N/a	Non-album singles
"Lover" (戀人 (연인))	2019	66	—N/a	Non-album singles
"AE"	2026	131	—N/a	A&E
"—" denotes releases that did not chart or were not released in that region.

=== As collaborative artist ===
Title	Year	Peak chart positions			Album
Title	Year	KOR	UK	US	Album
"Gyeonghuileul Nae Pume" (경희를 내 품에) (with Rain, Kim Tae-woo, Lyn)	2010	—	—	—	Non-album single
"Christmas Time" (with Sung Si-kyung, Seo In-guk, Brian Joo, Kim Hyung-joon, Lisa, Kyun Woo, Park Hak-ki)	2010	25	—	—	Jelly Christmas (single)
"I Live Like This" (나 이러고 살아) (with Skull)	2012	20	—	—	Non-album single
"Because It's Christmas" (크리스마스니까) (with Sung Si-kyung, Seo In-guk, Lee Seok-hoon, VIXX)	2012	1	—	—	Jelly Christmas 2012 Heart Project (single)
"Winter Propose" (겨울 고백) (with Sung Si-kyung, Seo In-guk, Vixx, Little Sister)	2013	1	—	—	Jelly Christmas 2013 (single)
"Winter Ahead" (with V)	2024	70	86	99	Non-album single
"—" denotes releases that did not chart or were not released in that region.

== Other charted songs ==
Title	Year	Peak chart positions	Album
Title	Year	KOR	Album
"Beautiful Day" (feat. Skull)	2010	74	Gift Part 2
"Tears Are About to Shed" (눈물 날려 그래)	2010	47	Gift Part 2
"Only U"	2010	59	Gift Part 2
"Love Barista" (러브 바리스타) (feat. Seo In-guk)	2010	68	Gift Part 2
"It's Strange" (Acoustic Ver.) (이상하다)	2012	19	Gift E.C.H.O

== Guest appearances ==
List of non-single guest appearances, with other performing artists, showing year released and album name
Title	Year	Other artist(s)	Album
"Legendary Love" (전설속의 사랑)	2000	Hwayobi	My All
"Its Gonna Be Rolling"	2000	Lee So-ra	Flower
"It's Only My World" (그것만이 내 세상)	2001	Kwon In-ha	A Tribute To Deulgukhwa
"Buried Pain" (묻어버린 아픔)	2001	—N/a	Remake Op.1 (What Are You Doing Tomorrow)
"More Than That" (그 보다 더)	2002	Kim Hyeon-Cheol	...And Kim Hyeon-Cheol
"Lovers of Heaven" (천국의 연인들)	2002	Jeon So-young	Killing Me Softly
"Thank You My Friend"	2002	—N/a	2002 "Soccer Festival"
"When Love Comes" (사랑이 올 때...)	2004	Lyn	Can U See The Bright
"If You"	2004	Ann	Phoenix Rising
"With You"	2006	Lisa	Mind Blowin'
"Prayer" (기도)	2006	MC Mong	The Way I Am
"Midsummer Snowman" (한여름 눈사람)	2009	Kim Hyung-joong	Polaroid
"Rudolph the Red-Nosed Reindeer / We Wish You a Merry Christmas"	2010	Lyn	Winter's Melody
"Love & Heaven"	2011	Jeon So-young	Non-album single

== Soundtrack appearances ==
Title	Year	Peak chart positions	Album
Title	Year	KOR	Album
"Love In the Legend" (전설 속의 사랑)	2000	—	Mr. Duke OST
"If We Meet Again" (다시 만난다면)	2004	—	My Brother OST
"Snow Flower" (눈의 꽃)	2004	164	I'm Sorry, I Love You OST
"Sorrow" (애상)	2007	—	Dae Jo-yeong OST
"Hwashin" (화신)	2008	—	Iljimae OST
"I Love You" (널 사랑한다)	2010	3	Athena: Goddess of War OST
"It's You"	2013	2	Marry Him If You Dare OST
"The Day" (Original Ver.) (그 날)	2018	26	Mr. Sunshine OST
"Hero"	2024	74	Firefighters OST
"—" denotes releases that did not chart or were not released in that region.

== Music videos ==
Title	Year
"Things I Can't Do For You"	1999
"Fool"	1999
"Far Away"	2001
"Yearning"	2001
"Good Person"	2002
"Standing There"	2004
"Because I'm a Common Man"	2004
"If We Meet Again"	2004
"Snow Flower"	2004
"Scattered Days"	2005
"Memories Resemble Love"	2007
"Let's Hate"	2007
"Sorrow"	2007
"The Castle of Zoltar"	2008
"After Love"	2009
"Wishing For You"	2010
"I Love You"	2010
"Goodbye Love"	2010
"Christmas Time"	2010
"I Promise You"	2010
"Tears Are About To Shed"	2011
"Because It's Christmas"	2011
"It's You"	2011
"Winter Propose"	2013
"Wild Flower"	2014
"Happy Together"	2014
"Shine Your Light"	2015
"Breath"	2016
"Beautiful Tomorrow"	2016
"Home"	2016
"The Other Day"	2018
"Goodbye"	2019
"LOVER" (Lyric Video)	2019
