= Shirley Kwan =

Hong Kong singer and actress

- Kwan in 2007
- Born: 15 August 1966 (age 60); British Hong Kong
- Occupations: Singer; actress
- Years active: 1986–1996, 2001, 2005–2020
- Musical career
- Genres: Pop
- Labels: Apollon (1989–1990); PolyGram (1989–1995); BMG (2001); Music Nation (2005–2006); Star Entertainment (2008–2009)

Chinese name
- Traditional Chinese: 關淑怡
- Simplified Chinese: 关淑怡
Transcriptions
Standard Mandarin
- Hanyu Pinyin: Guān Shúyí
Yue: Cantonese
- Jyutping: Gwaan1 Suk9 Ji4

Shirley Kwan Suk-yee (Chinese: 關淑怡; born 15 August 1966) is a Hong Kong singer and actress. Kwan first shot to fame in 1989 with the hit "Happy Are Those in Love" (難得有情人) and was widely popular throughout the early to mid-1990s. She is noted for her distinct, whispery vocal style and known equally for singing mainstream ballads and more alternative songs. She announced her retirement from the music industry in April 2020.

== Early life ==
Kwan was born in British Hong Kong and moved to Los Angeles at the age of twelve. She studied fashion before venturing into the entertainment industry in 1986, at the age of 20.

== Music career ==
=== 1986–1988: Early years ===
Kwan had her first taste of the limelight in 1986 when she became one of twelve finalists in TVB's New Talent Singing Awards, along with Andy Hui and Leon Lai, but lost to both. Two years later, with the encouragement of a friend, she recorded a demo tape for the prestigious "Marine Blue" singing competition in Japan and won. She caught the eyes of record executives at Apollon and signed a contract, releasing two Japanese pop albums in two years. Kwan sang in both Japanese and English for these releases, and notably made her first and only rap vocals in the song "Borderless".

=== 1989–1995: PolyGram period ===
Kwan's Marine Blue success in Japan quickly led to her discovery by PolyGram. On 1 March 1989, Kwan released her debut Cantonese album Winter Love (冬戀), with its R&B-influenced first single "The Rebel" (叛逆漢子).

Her second album, Happy Are those in Love, would produce her first major hit with its title track, which immediately propelled Kwan into Hong Kong stardom. The song "Happy are Those in Love" was the theme song to a popular day-time drama series on TVB. It reached no. 1 on the TVB charts and was frequently requested in karaoke bars at the time. The album, which sold platinum, enjoyed huge chart success and spawned a further hit single, the up-tempo "Lovers Beneath the Stars" (星空下的戀人), with Kwan sweeping newcomer awards at all of the major year-end music award shows.

The following two years saw the release of four albums, in which Kwan started to develop a more individualistic style. After scoring another major pop hit in 1990 with 愛恨纏綿, Kwan began incorporating elements from a wider variety of musical genres. Her 1991 album Love is Forever (戀一世的愛) saw her exploring New Age music, with cover versions of songs by Gregorian and Michael Cretu. As a marketing strategy, PolyGram presented its title track, which was a cover version of "Once in a Life Time," back to back with the Gregorian original on the promotional disc that was sent out to radio DJs at the time. Kwan also covered Amina's 1991 winning Eurovision entry, "Le dernier qui a parlé", rewritten by veteran lyricist Andrew Lam (林敏驄) as "Buddhist Chant" (梵音), which became a surprising top 10 radio single.

On 18 November 1993, Kwan released the platinum-selling album, The Story of Shirley (真假情話), which spawned the minor hit "Fake Love" (假的戀愛). The album signalled a change in vocal style, with a whispery delivery that featured more prominently than before, and which would become her trademark style.

Kwan further established her place as a cantopop diva with the album My Way, released on 8 July 1994. This would be the last album containing all original Cantonese material until Shirley's Era in 2009. Singles included the acid-jazz influenced "Death of a Legend" (逝去的傳奇) which sampled a riff from the Digable Planets' 1993 single "Rebirth of Slick," and the immensely popular ballad "Cuddling Underneath the Stars" (繾綣星光下), another of Kwan's major career hits, which won numerous song awards at the ceremonies that year. The album also featured two of Andrew Lam's techno and house inflected compositions "Anxiety" (緊張) and "Out of This World" (驚世感覺), as well as another popular ballad "Farewell Love Song" (告別戀曲). My Way, the cover of which featured Kwan in a new crew-cut look that has since become iconic, was one of the most celebrated in 1994, enjoying a high-degree of both commercial and critical success.

With increasing confidence in her musical style, Kwan asked producer Joseph Ip (葉廣權) and eight different sound engineers to rearrange ten of her favourite cantopop songs which she handpicked for a covers album. The result was 'EX' All Time Favourites, released in February 1995, which featured covers of classics by Anita Mui, Leslie Cheung and Alan Tam, reworked and reinterpreted with Kwan's alternative musical influences and trademark, ethereal singing style. The lead single, a cover version of Teresa Teng's "Forget Him" rearranged by Donald Ashley, was featured in Wong Kar-wai's 1995 arthouse film Fallen Angels. The album sold three times platinum, and was selected in 2000 as one of the Top 20 Defining Chinese Albums of All Time for the book (聽見2000分之100) by a jury of musicians which included Anthony Wong, Sandee Chan, Carl Wong and Lin Wei-Che.

In the summer of 1995, Kwan released her third compilation album, Journey of Life (世途上 新曲＋精選), containing two new singles, "He Needs You, She Needs You" (他需要你, 她需要你), a dreampop track that incorporats the traditional Chinese instrument erhu, and the minor hit "Are There Real Friends in Life" (人生可有知己), a pop ballad which has since become a fan favourite.

Riding on the success of a string of platinum-selling albums, Kwan held her first large-scale solo concert series, "The One and Only Shirley Kwan in Concert" (難得有一個關淑怡演唱會), in June 1995 at the Hong Kong Coliseum.

=== 1996–2000: Hiatus ===
After seven years at PolyGram, Kwan's contract came to an end in June 1996. A final PolyGram studio album was initially scheduled for release in the summer, containing three American collaborations ("Infectious" [傳染] and "Elusive Love" [愛難尋] written by Andy Goldmark; and "Mumbling" [自言自語] by Suzanne Fountain) and seven other tracks. However, due to Kwan's departure, PolyGram released the material separately in 1997's compilation Connection (心靈相通) and 1998's EP eZone.

Kwan spent the second half of the 90s mostly away from the public eye, but managed to strike up some significant collaborations with friends and fellow contemporaries Tats Lau and Anthony Wong Yiu Ming of the former Tat Ming Pair. The first of these included "Blessed Mary" (萬福馬利亞), a duet with Wong satirising Hong Kong's materialism released in late 1995. This was followed by the Tats Lau collaboration "Cuddle 28800BPS" (繾綣28800BPS), a song dealing with cyber love, and a cover version of the gender-ambiguous Tat Ming classic "Forget He is She" (忘記他是她) at their request, both in 1996. In 1997, Kwan lent her vocals to the theme song of a radio drama produced by Commercial Radio Hong Kong, "Take Me Out Dancing" (帶我去跳舞) which featured a soprano backing vocal mixed with a thumping dance beat. In 1999, she held a "Music Is Live" concert organized by Commercial Radio.

=== 2001–2002: BMG period ===
After several years of inactivity, Kwan attempted a short comeback in 2001, signing a contract reportedly worth 8-million dollars with BMG Taiwan in a high-profile press conference. Working with well-known producers such as Anthony Bao (包小松), Jamie Hsueh (薛忠銘), and Benjamin Lin (林明陽), she released one Mandarin album, Freezing Flame (冷火) in November, to critical acclaim. The album spawned two singles, "Freezing Flame" (冷火) and "Who" (是誰) which featured a mix of string instruments and electronic elements. Although the initial contract was for 4 albums, this came to a halt in 2002, when Kwan had become pregnant and moved to Canada. It was in an interview with Mingpao in 2013, in which she revealed that BMG had not arranged for any recording sessions for more than a year after she gave birth, and this ultimately led to an early termination.

In 2003, she was requested by Eason Chan to record guest vocals for the track "Lies" (謊言) on his album Live for Today.

=== 2005–2006: Music Nation period ===
In fall 2005, Kwan stepped into the recording studio once again and performed a duet with music veteran Alan Tam in "Rekindle The Flame" (舊情復熾), a Cantonese remake of the French ballad "J'ai murmuré va-t-en". The news of Kwan making a comeback sent excitement through Hong Kong's airwaves, and "Rekindle" took the charts by storm, reaching number 1 on TVB, RTHK and Metro Radio.

Two months later, Kwan was signed to a contract with Music Nation Group (大國文化) by the famous producer Frankie Lee Chun. The first single "About Me" (關於我) saw Kwan reunited with lyrist Wyman Wong and long-time collaborators Joseph Ip and John Laudon. Supported by extensive airplay, "About Me" steadily climbed to the top of various radio charts, and its limited-release special edition CD sold out within a day.

In early February 2006, the eponymous EP Shirley Kwan was released, introducing the second brand new single, "Evolution" (進化論). This coincided with the release of a 3CD-Karaoke plus DVD compilation by Universal Music (formally PolyGram), entitled All About Shirley, which contained side projects and rare tracks dating back to the very beginning of her career in Japan.

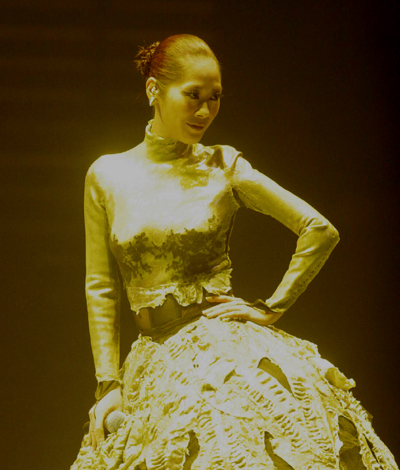
2006 Being Shirley On Stage

To much anticipation, three comeback concerts, "Being Shirley On Stage" (關於我 關淑怡演唱會) were held in late February, at the legendary Hong Kong Coliseum. Performing her biggest hits in reverse chronological order, Kwan garnered positive reviews for the performance, which dominated entertainment headlines for a week. In the final encore, Kwan famously covered Eason Chan's "Today Next Year" (明年今日) to a standing ovation, and a sing-a-long audience of 30, 000.

=== 2007–2009: Star Entertainment period ===
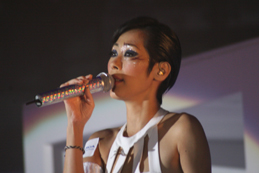
Kwan performing in 2007

Upon completion of her contract with Music Nation, Kwan released two new songs in February 2007 as an independent artist for songwriter Keith Chan (陳輝陽)'s multimedia musical "12 faces of woman" (十二金釵眾生花) at the 2007 Hong Kong Arts Festival. This included the theme song "All Living Flowers" (眾生花), which featured a mix of traditional Chinese and Western string instruments and a duet with Lee Heung Kam, "3000 Years Ago" (三千年後) which won the CASH Golden Sail Music Award for Best Alternative Song. In March, she released the single "Just Once" (只得一次), which was the theme song to a primetime TVB sitcom series and reached no. 1 on the TVB singles chart.

In June 2007, longtime friend and veteran producer Herman Ho (何哲圖) recruited Shirley to his new company "Star Entertainment Ltd." (星娛樂有限公司), which is financed by Neway Karaoke Box (Neway卡拉OK).

2008 saw the release of two new singles, "Mountain, River" (山水) and 天規, followed by a new concert series, "Unexpected Shirley Kwan in Concert," which was held at the Hong Kong Coliseum on 24–25 April 2008.

On 15 June 2009, Kwan released the long-anticipated studio album Shirley's Era, which contains all singles released in 2007–2008 as well as newly recorded material. This marked her first, full-length Cantonese studio album since 1994's All Time Favourites. The album produced the new single, "The Ends of the Earth" (地盡頭) which reached no. 1 on the 903 Commercial Radio charts.

=== 2010–2017: Independent ===
In October 2010, Kwan performed a live concert "One Starry Night: An Evening with Shirley Kwan" at the Venetian Arena in Macau, which featured mostly live covers of songs by other artists, such as Alan Tam's "Illusion" (幻影), Aaron Kwok's "Why did I let you go?" (我為何讓你走) and Faye Wong's "I'm Willing" (我願意). She returned to the same stage on 12 November 2011 with long-time friend and collaborator Anthony Wong for the concert, "Anthony Wong x Shirley Kwan: Forget He is She Concert, Macau 2011."

In 2012, Kwan collaborated with Juno Mak on the single "Clavicle" (鎖骨), which offers a mature example of her dream pop vocals and reached no. 1 on the Commercial Radio charts. In late 2012, she released the limited edition single "Tourbillon" (陀飛輪), a cover of an Eason Chan song to polarized reviews, but which was lauded by both the lyricist Wyman Wong and Anthony Wong for her authorial style.

On 2 February 2013, she held her 4th concert series at the Hong Kong Coliseum, "Philip Stein Your Favorite Shirley Kwan Suk'E In Concert," for two consecutive evenings. Later that year, she took part in a series of concerts, "Polygram Forever" for the newly revived label and recorded the theme song, "Coincidence" (實屬巧合) for the TVB series Always and Ever (情逆三世緣).

In 2014, she recorded a duet with Mag Lam (星斗群) as the theme song to the TVB series Never Dance Alone (女人俱樂部).

In 2016, Kwan held a concert celebrating her 25th anniversary in the music industry, "The Best of Shirley Kwan 25 Live," at the Hong Kong Coliseum to rave reviews. Kwan dedicated the performance to her late mother, and broke down during her performance of the Hins Cheung cover, "Stay Young Forever" (青春常註), prompting a memorable audience sing-along.

On 9 April 2017, she performed as a musical guest at the 36th Hong Kong Film awards amidst controversy of her recent arrest for intimidation and common assault. She performed a medley of theme songs including "Invincible" (無敵) and "Let Me Stay by Your Side" (讓我留在你身邊) backed by Hanjin Tan, Supper Moment and The Interzone Collective, as well as presented the awards for Best Original Film Song and Best Original Score.

=== 2018–2020: Universal period and retirement ===
In 2018, Kwan signed on with Universal Music Group. However, the working relationship between the company and Kwan was rocky, and Kwan announced that she would retire from the entertainment industry after having fulfilled her contract.

== Discography ==
=== Studio albums ===
- 1989: Winter Love (冬戀)
- 1989: Happy are Those in Love (難得有情人)
- 1989: Say Goodbye [Japanese]
- 1990: True Love (真情)
- 1990: Borderless [Japanese / English]
- 1990: Lost in the Night (夜迷宮)
- 1991: Golden Summer (金色夏季)
- 1991: Love is Forever (戀一世的愛)
- 1992: Creating an Illusion (製造迷夢)
- 1993: The Story of Shirley (真假情話)
- 1994: Happy are Those in Love (難得有情人) [Mandarin]
- 1994: My Way
- 1995: Ex' All Time Favourites
- 1995: Bewildered (亂了) [Mandarin]
- 2001: Freezing Flame (冷火) [Mandarin]
- 2009: Shirley's Era
- 2019: Psychoacoustics

=== EPs ===
- 1998: eZone
- 2006: Shirley Kwan

=== Compilations ===
- 1991: Montage
- 1993: Montage II
- 1995: Journey of Life (世途上 新曲+精選)
- 1997: Telepathic Connection (心靈相通 新曲+精選)
- 2008: Unlimited (無盡經典)

== Filmography ==
In early 1997, Kwan was asked by Hong Kong filmmaker Wong Kar-wai to star in his film Happy Together. She was flown to Argentina in five days' notice and ended up spending more than two months filming. Starring opposite Tony Leung Chiu-Wai and Chang Chen, Kwan played Leung's mysterious and lonely secret admirer and also recorded a cover of Caetano Veloso's "Cucurucucu Paloma" (Song of Dove) for the film's soundtrack. However, her scenes were all deleted from the final version of the film, for which Wong later went on to win Best Director at the Cannes. It took another three years for Kwan's scenes to surface, when they were included in the making-of documentary, Buenos Aires Zero Degrees (布宜諾斯艾利斯之攝氏零度). The documentary premiered at the 2000 Berlin International Film Festival out of competition, and was also shown at the 2000 Golden Horse Film Festival and Awards in Taiwan.

Release date	Title in English	Title in Chinese	Notes
1992	Be My Guest (TV Series)	我愛玫瑰園	Cameo appearances on episodes 45–48.
1992	Saviour of the Soul II	九二神鵰之痴心情長劍	Supporting role
1993	The Tigers – The Legends of Canton	廣東五虎之鐵拳無敵孫中山	Cameo appearance
1996	Out of the Blur	廢話小說	Silent film
1997	Buenos Aires Zero Degree: The Making of Happy Together	布宜諾斯艾利斯之攝氏零度	Lead actress; All scenes deleted from Happy Together, but included in this documentary

== Personal life ==
Kwan is a single mother and gave birth to her son in January 2002 in Canada. For a long time, Kwan has not disclosed the true paternity of her child and insisted only that they had met in Canada, and is not someone in the entertainment business. Kwan broke her silence on the matter in 2014 when she posted a photo of Zuri Rinpoche the 8th, a Bhutanese religious teacher, on her Instagram, with a caption saying he is the true father of her child.

In the past, Kwan has been romantically linked to Michael Chow (1992–96), and Hacken Lee.

=== Controversies ===
In September 2012, Kwan posted a suicidal message on Facebook. She was incommunicado for roughly thirty-six hours before contacting her younger sister to confirm her safety.

In October 2016, Kwan was rescued from the waters off Kensington Beach. She had been walking along the shore with a female friend, who reportedly told officers that Kwan was unhappy from work and had walked down to the sea for a swim.

In May 2017, Kwan was charged with one count of intimidation and one count of common assault for an altercation that took place with a Kensington Beach Hotel restaurant staff earlier in March.

== Concerts ==
Concerts	Date	Venue & Location	No. of Shows	Notes
Endless Dream (製造迷夢音樂會)	29 June 1992	AC Hall, Hong Kong Baptist University	1	Other performers: Vivian Chow
Shirley Kwan in Concert (難得有一個關淑怡演唱會)	9–12 June 1995	Hong Kong Coliseum	4	First solo arena concert
Absolutely Shirley Kwan New Year's Live (絕對關淑怡新年音樂會)	22–24 February 1996	Tuen Mun, Tsuen Wan & Sha Tin City Hall	3	
Las Vegas Casino (拉斯維加斯賭城演唱會)	19 June 1999	Las Vegas	1	
Music is Live (拉闊音樂會)	20 July 1999	Hong Kong Convention and Exhibition Centre	1	Guests: Anthony Wong, Eason Chan, Mavis Fan
Shirley Kwan & Frankie Kao (關淑怡, 高凌風演唱會)	12 September 1999	Trump Plaza Theater, Atlantic City NJ, USA	1	Other performers: Frankie Kao
Being Shirley on Stage (關於我 關淑怡演唱會)	23–25 February 2006	Hong Kong Coliseum	3	Guests: Eason Chan, Chet Lam
Wild Day Out – Diva Duet (謝安琪遇見關淑怡)	29 September 2006	Hard Rock Cafe, Hong Kong	1	Other performers: Kay Tse
Being Shirley on Stage – Toronto Stop (關於我 關淑怡多倫多演唱會)	26 August 2007	Casino Rama: Orillia, ON, Canada	1	
unexpected SHIRLEY KWAN IN CONCERT 08	24–25 April 2008	Hong Kong Coliseum	2	
ONE STARRY NIGHT An evening with Shirley Kwan (關淑怡澳門演唱會)	9 October 2010	Macao Venetian	1	
Anthony Wong x Shirley Kwan Forget He is She (黃耀明X關淑怡 忘記他是她演唱會 澳門站)	12 November 2011	Macao Venetian	1	Other performers: Anthony Wong
Your Favorite Shirley Kwan Suk'E in Concert (翡麗詩丹關淑怡演唱會)	2–3 February 2013	Hong Kong Coliseum	2	Guests: Anthony Wong, Alan Tam, Hacken Lee, C-AllStar
Shirley Kwan《Your Favorite》Live in Rama (關淑怡華瑪演唱會)	25 May 2014	Casino Rama: Orillia, ON, Canada	1	
Shirley Kwan & HOCC Concert (關淑怡和何韻詩H❤K演唱會)	27 December 2014	Reno Ballroom, Nevada	1	Other performers: Denise Ho
Shirley Kwan x Ray Wong x Elaine Koo (感覺．國樂 關淑怡X王憓X顧芮寧 中西薈萃音樂國度)	27 December 2015	Hong Kong Cultural Center	1	Other performers: Elaine Koo, Ray Wong
The Best of Shirley Kwan 25 Live (關淑怡25演唱會)	23 April 2016	Hong Kong Coliseum	1	
An Intimate Shirley Kwan Live 2016 (關淑怡澳門演唱會2016)	9 July 2016	Macao Venetian Theatre	1	

== Awards ==
- 1988
  - Marine Blue Singing Competition, Japan
- 1989
  - RTHK 12th Top 10 Gold Song Awards – Best Newcomer (Silver)
  - CASH Golden Sail Music Awards – Best Chinese (Pop) Song: "Happy are Those in Love" (難得有情人)
  - Jade Solid Gold 2nd Seasonal Awards – "Happy are Those in Love"
  - Jade Solid Gold 4th Seasonal Awards – "Lovers Underneath the Stars" (星空下的戀人)
  - Jade Solid Gold Best 10 Awards Presentation – Song Award: "Happy are Those in Love"
  - Jade Solid Gold Best 10 Awards Presentation – Most Popular Newcomer
  - Commercial Radio Hong Kong Ultimate Song Chart Awards – Best Female Newcomer (Gold)
- 1990
  - Jade Solid Gold 2nd Seasonal Awards – (愛恨纏綿)
  - Jade Solid Gold Best 10 Awards Presentation – Song Award: (愛恨纏綿)
- 1991
  - Jade Solid Gold 1st Seasonal Awards – "Lost in the Night" (夜迷宮)
  - Jade Solid Gold 3rd Seasonal Awards – (一切也願意)
- 1992
  - Jade Solid Gold 1st Seasonal Awards – "Love is Forever" (戀一世的愛)
  - CRHK Ultimate Song Chart Awards – Ultimate Female Singer (Bronze)
  - Metro Radio Hit Music Awards – Breakthrough Female Singer
  - Metro Radio Hit Music Awards – Hit Female Singer (Bronze)
- 1993
  - Jade Solid Gold 3rd Seasonal Awards – "Summer Party" (熱力節拍 Wou Bom Ba)
  - Jade Solid Gold 4th Seasonal Awards – "Fake Love" (假的戀愛)
  - Jade Solid Gold Best 10 Awards Presentation – Best Music Video: "Summer Party" (熱力節拍 Wou Bom Ba)
- 1994
  - 1st Annual Hong Kong Record Design Awards – Best Hairstyle: My Way
  - RTHK 17th Top 10 Gold Song Awards – Song Award: "Cuddling Under the Stars" (繾綣星光下)
  - Metro Radio Hit Music Awards – Song Award: "Cuddling Under the Stars"
  - Jade Solid Gold 3rd Seasonal Awards – "Cuddling Under the Stars"
  - Jade Solid Gold Best 10 Awards Presentation – Song Award: "Cuddling Under the Stars"
- 1995
  - Jade Solid Gold 1st Seasonal Awards – "Forget Him" (忘記他)
  - Jade Solid Gold 3rd Seasonal Awards – "Are There Soulmates in Life?" (人生可有知己)
  - CRHK Ultimate Song Chart Awards – Ultimate Female Singer (Silver)
  - Metro Radio Hit Music Awards – Best Adult Contemporary Ballad: "Are There Soulmates in Life?"
- 1996
  - Metro Radio Hit Music Awards – Female Singer Award (Silver)
  - Metro Radio Hit Music Awards – Song Award: "Forget Him"
- 2007
  - CASH Golden Sail Music Awards – Best Alternative Song: "3000 Years Ago" (三千年前)
- 2008
  - 8th Chinese Media Music Awards – Special Jury Prize: "3000 Years Ago"
- 2013
  - Jade Solid Gold Selections (Part One) – "Tourbillon" (陀飛輪)
