= EX All Time Favourites =

'EX' All Time Favourites

Studio album by Shirley Kwan
- Released: February 1995
- Genre: Cantopop
- Length: 38:42
- Label: PolyGram
- Producer: Joseph Ip, Lam Ming Young (Mandarin version)

Shirley Kwan chronology
My Way (1994)	'EX' All Time Favourites (1995)	Journey of Life (1995)

'EX' All Time Favourites is a Cantopop/Mandopop tribute album by Hong Kong solo artist Shirley Kwan, released in 1995. It was released in Hong Kong, Taiwan, China and Japan, and later remastered in 1997.

== Track listings ==
=== Hong Kong release ===
Track	Title	Title in English	Composed by	Lyrics by	Rearranged by	Original artist
01	忘記他	Forget Him	James Wong	James Wong	Donald Ashley	Teresa Teng
02	夢伴	Dream Lover	Kisaburo Suzuki	林敏聰	劉志遠	Anita Mui
03	唱一首好歌 (duet with Alan Tam)	Sing a Good Song	B & M GIBB	鄭國江	徐日勤	Alan Tam
04	把歌談心	Confide in a Melody	林慕德	卡龍	林慕德	林姍姍
05	李香蘭	Yoshiko Ōtaka	玉置浩二	周禮茂	劉諾生	Jacky Cheung
06	這是愛	This Is Love	林敏怡	林敏聰	林敏怡	Teddy Robin
07	深夜港灣	Midnight Harbour	Masashi Sada	潘偉源	杜自持	甄楚倩
08	問	Ask	區志華	區志華	蘇德華	區桂芬、葉源春
09	印象	Impression	Sam Hui	Sam Hui/黎彼德	杜自持	Sam Hui
10	拒絕再玩	Don't Wanna Mess Around No More	玉置浩二	林振強	Donald Ashley	Leslie Cheung

=== Taiwan release ===
In the Taiwan version of EX, "Forget Him" and "This Is Love" were replaced with newly arranged Mandarin versions of "It's a Pity" (Track 1) and "Can't Let Go" (Track 6).

Track	Title	Title in English	Composed by	Lyrics by	Rearranged by	Original artist
01	可惜	What a Pity	James Wong	謝明訓	江建民	Teresa Teng
02	夢伴	Dream Lover	Kisaburo Suzuki	林敏聰	劉志遠	Anita Mui
03	唱一首好歌 (duet with Alan Tam)	Sing a Good Song	B & M GIBB	鄭國江	徐日勤	Alan Tam
04	把歌談心	Confide in a Melody	林慕德	卡龍	林慕德	林姍姍
05	李香蘭	Yoshiko Ōtaka	玉置浩二	周禮茂	劉諾生	Jacky Cheung
06	戀戀不捨	Can't Let Go	林敏怡	姚若龍	？	Teddy Robin
07	深夜港灣	Midnight Harbour	Masashi Sada	潘偉源	杜自持	甄楚倩
08	問	Ask	區志華	區志華	蘇德華	區桂芬、葉源春
09	印象	Impression	Sam Hui	Sam Hui/黎彼德	杜自持	Sam Hui
10	拒絕再玩	Don't Wanna Mess Around No More	玉置浩二	林振強	Donald Ashley	Leslie Cheung

== Other releases ==
Besides the Hong Kong and Taiwan releases, there are at least four other versions of 'EX'. These include:

- 1995: China version, called "What a Pity" (可惜), essentially a hybrid of the Hong Kong & Taiwan versions
- 1995 Jul: Japanese version
- 1997 Mar: PolyGram 88 Superb Sound Quality Series Denon Mastersonic Digital Remastering CD
- 2003 Dec: Hybrid Stereo SACD
