= Goodbye Again =

Goodbye Again may refer to:

== Books ==
- Goodbye, Again, a 2021 essay collection by Jonny Sun

== Film and television ==
- Goodbye Again (1933 film), directed by Michael Curtiz, starring Warren William and Joan Blondell
  - Goodbye Again, a 1928 play written by George Haight and Allan Scott, on which the film was based
- Goodbye Again (1961 film), directed by Anatole Litvak, featuring Ingrid Bergman, Yves Montand and Anthony Perkins
- Goodbye Again (TV series), a 1968 TV series with Peter Cook and Dudley Moore
- Goodbye Again, a 2023 TV series starring Huang Pei-jia

== Music ==
- "Goodbye Again", a 1972 song by John Denver from the album Rocky Mountain High
- "Goodbye Again", a 2003 song by Vertical Horizon from the album Go
