= Auf Wiedersehen =

Auf Wiedersehen, Auf Wiederseh'n, or Auf Wiedersehn may refer to:

- "Auf Wiedersehen" (song), a 1978 song by Cheap Trick
- Auf Wiedersehen (Red Garland album), 1971
- Auf Wiedersehn (Demis Roussos album), 1974
- Auf Wiedersehen (Equinox album), 1989
- Auf Wiedersehen (film), 1961 West German comedy film

== See also ==
- Auf Wiedersehen, Pet, British TV comedy
