= My Way (Shirley Kwan album) =

Studio album by Shirley Kwan
- Released: 8 July 1994
- Recorded: April 1994
- Genre: Cantopop; Pop; Dance; Techno
- Length: 43:13
- Label: PolyGram
- Producer: Joseph Ip

Shirley Kwan chronology
The Story of Shirley (1993)	My Way (1994)	'Ex' All Time Favourites (1995)

My Way is the ninth Cantonese studio album by Hong Kong solo artist Shirley Kwan, released in 8 July 1994.

== Track listing ==
Track	Title	Title in English	Composed by	Lyrics by	Arranged by
01	逝去的傳奇	Lost Legend	Dick Lee	向雪懷	周啟生
02	繾綣星光下	Cuddling Underneath the Stars	J.L. Dabadie/G. Lunghini	周禮茂	Tony A
03	緊張	Anxiety	Lam Man Chung	因葵	Lam Man Chung
04	夜靠誰	Who Cares For Me In the Night	周啟生	余紹琪	周啟生
05	平靜裡的一盞燈	The Lamp of Tranquility	J.L. Dabadie/G. Lunghini	Lam Man Chung	蘇德華
06	心箭	Arrow To The Heart	草生	Wong Jim	周啟生
07	RUMOUR	RUMOUR	Lauren Christy	Keith Chan (陳少琪)	Tony A
08	告別戀曲	Farewell	中西保志	簡寧	Tony A
09	驚世感覺	Out Of This World	Lam Man Chung	Lam Man Chung	Lam Man Chung
10	偷取我心	Stealing My Heart	蘇德華	黃真	蘇德華
11	窗內窗外	A Window Apart	Lauren Christy	簡寧	Tony A
