= Hello Cruel World =

Hello Cruel World may refer to:

- Hello Cruel World (Tall Dwarfs album), 1988
- Hello Cruel World (Sole and the Skyrider Band album), 2011
- "Hello, Cruel World" (Supernatural), an episode of American TV series Supernatural
- Hello, Cruel World, a 2006 book by Kate Bornstein
- Hello Cruel World, a 2012 album by Gretchen Peters
- "Hello Cruel World", a song by E from the 1992 album A Man Called E
- "Hello Cruel World", a song by Bad Religion from the 2013 album True North
