= Goodbye to You =

Goodbye to You may refer to:

- "Goodbye to You" (Michelle Branch song)
- "Goodbye to You" (Roxette song)
- "Goodbye to You" (Scandal song), also covered by The Veronicas
- "Goodbye To You", by Breaking Point from Beautiful Disorder and Marvel's Fantastic Four: Original Soundtrack
- "Goodbye to You", by Screeching Weasel from You Broke My Fucking Heart
- "Goodbye to You", by Zox from Take Me Home
