= Brian Leung Siu Fai =

Brian Leung Siu Fai (Chinese: 梁兆輝; pinyin: Liáng Zhàohuī; born 7 April 1964) is a radio DJ/presenter in Hong Kong. He hosts "We Are Family" (自己人) and "Go West" (輝遊記) on RTHK Radio 2. He has been working in broadcasting for two decades and has worked for radio stations like MetroRadio's 104 FM Select (now called MetroFinance) and CRHK. He is fluent in Cantonese, English and Mandarin.

== Programs Hosted ==
=== RTHK Radio 2 ===
- We Are Family (自己人) - a weekly radio talk show focusing on nonheterosexual issues in Hong Kong. It began on 6 May 2006. Brian Leung is joined by two hosts, Eric Leung and Tanner Lee. It broadcasts on Saturdays from midnight to 2am. It is considered to be the first nonheterosexual program to be broadcast in Asia. Brian Leung is also the head of GayStation Hong Kong, a website that streams radio to primarily homosexual audience.
- Go West (輝遊記) - a music program primarily playing English songs. Go West used to be on 104 F.M. Select from 4 P.M. to 6 P.M. on Monday to Friday in the mid 1990s to early 2000. The program has made a return on RTHK Radio 2 and is broadcast on Sundays from midnight to 2 A.M..
