= Goodbye Cruel World =

Goodbye Cruel World may refer to:

== Music ==
- Goodbye Cruel World (Elvis Costello album), an album by Elvis Costello and the Attractions
- Goodbye Cruel World (Custard album), an album by Custard
- Goodbye Cruel World, a 1999 album by Brutal Truth
- "Goodbye Cruel World" (James Darren song), a song by James Darren
- "Goodbye Cruel World" (Pink Floyd song), a song by Pink Floyd from The Wall
- "Goodbye Cruel World" (Shakespears Sister song), a song by Shakespears Sister

== Other uses ==
- Goodbye Cruel World (TV series), a 1992 British drama starring Sue Johnston and Alum Armstrong

== See also ==
- Suicide note
