= Never Say Goodbye =

Never Say Goodbye may refer to:

== Films ==
- Never Say Goodbye (1946 film), a romantic comedy directed by James V. Kern, and starring Errol Flynn and Eleanor Parker
- Never Say Goodbye (1956 film), US drama film directed by Jerry Hopper and starring Rock Hudson
- Kabhi Alvida Naa Kehna (Never Say Goodbye), 2006 romance film directed by Karan Johar; starring Shah Rukh Khan and Rani Mukerji

== Albums ==
- Never Say Goodbye (Ten album), live album released in 1998 by British hard rock band Ten
- Never Say Goodbye (Sam Bettens album), 2008
- Never Say Goodbye, 1999 studio album by Roky Erickson

== Songs ==
- "Never Say Goodbye" (Yoko Ono song), 1982
- "Never Say Goodbye" (Bon Jovi song), 1987
- "Never Say Goodbye" (Hardwell and Dyro song), 2013
- "Never Say Goodbye", song from Bob Dylan's 1974 album Planet Waves
- "Never Say Goodbye", song on JoJo's eponymous debut album
- "Never Say Goodbye", B-side to the 1987 single "Strawberry Wine" by My Bloody Valentine
- "Never Say Goodbye", song from Hayley Westenra's 2003 album Pure
- "Never Say Goodbye", song from Leatherface's 2010 album The Stormy Petrel
- "Never Say Goodbye", end theme to the South Korean television series My Girl (2005)
- "Never Say Goodbye", the opening theme song for the final three films in the Girls und Panzer das Finale series

== Other uses ==
- Never Say Goodbye (musical), musical written by Shûichirô Koike and Frank Wildhorn; first produced in 2006
- Never Say Goodbye (TV series), Philippine television drama that premiered in 2013
