= Yi-Kwei Sze =

Chinese-born American opera singer (1915–1994)

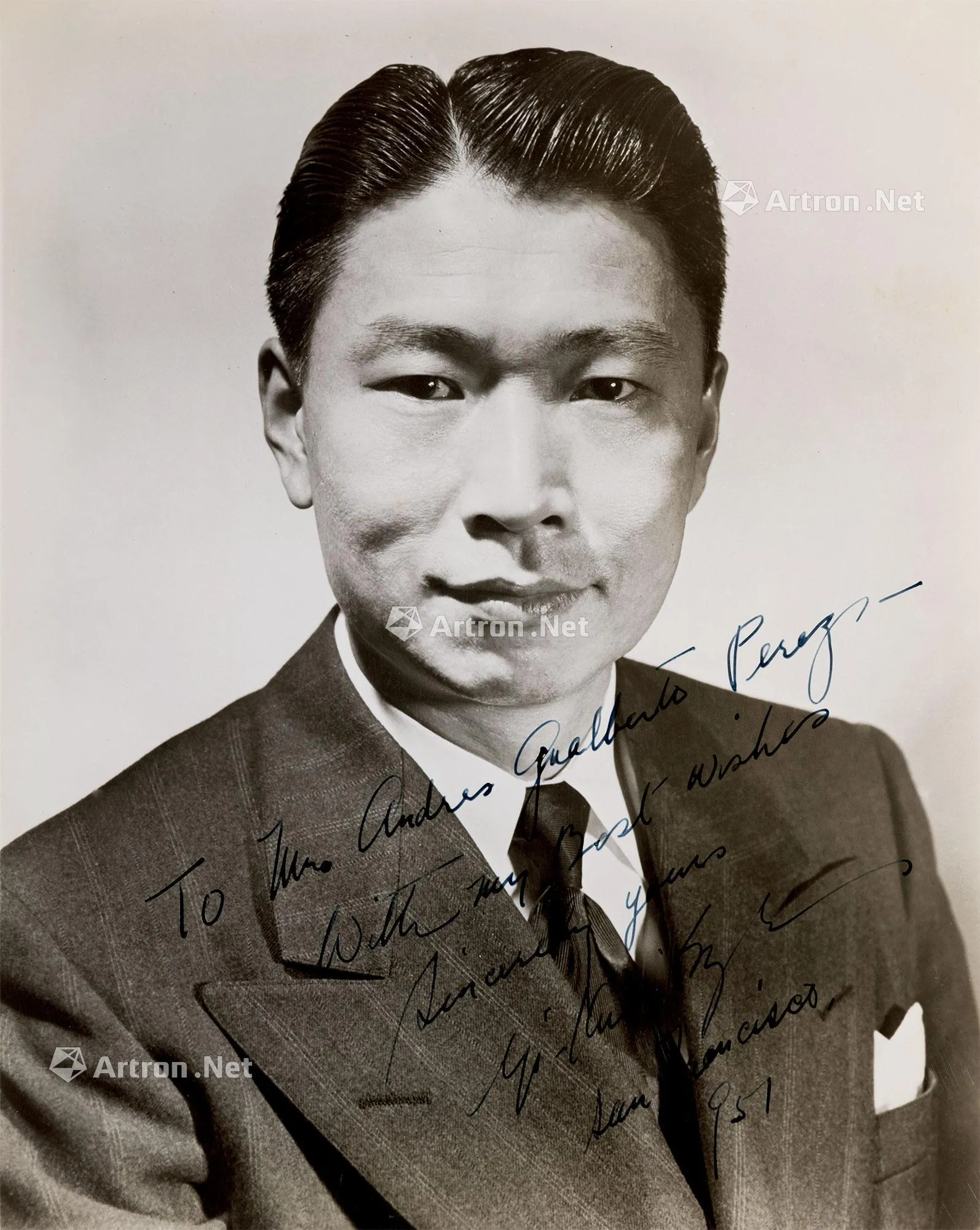
Yi-Kwei Sze

Yi-Kwei Sze (斯義桂 pinyin: Sī Yìguì, 1915 – November 5, 1994) was a Chinese operatic bass-baritone and music educator.

Born in Shanghai and a graduate of the Shanghai Conservatory of Music, Sze began his career performing and teaching voice in China. In 1947 he came to the United States where he made his professional debut singing at Town Hall in New York City. He continued to study singing in New York with Alexander Kipnis. He went on to have a successful career appearing on the concert stage and in operas, appearing with the Boston Symphony Orchestra, the Chicago Symphony Orchestra, the Cleveland Orchestra, La Scala, the London Symphony, the New Orleans Opera, the New York City Opera, the New York Philharmonic, the Philadelphia Orchestra, and the San Francisco Opera among other important ensembles and organizations. He notably performed the role of Elviro in Handel's Xerxes at Carnegie Hall for the inaugural performance of the Handel Society of New York on 20 November 1966 with Maureen Forrester in the title role, Maureen Lehane as Arsamene, Janet Baker as Amastre, Teresa Stich-Randall as Romilda, Alpha Brawner as Atalanta, and John Shirley-Quirk as Ariodate.

Sze's recordings were awarded France's Académie du disque lyrique in both 1966 and 1967, and the Dutch Edison Award in 1966. From 1971 to 1980 he taught on the voice faculty of the Eastman School of Music.

He died in San Francisco.

Yu Guangzhong's poem "To Yi-Kwei Sze" says:

"The first time I heard your deep and resonant bass, it shook my hometown dialect along the Tamsui River, reverberating through the watery accents of my roots. Your magnetic singing rocked me like a boat, carrying me back to the other shore..."

== Selected discography ==
- 1953 Hector Berlioz: Roméo et Juliette. Margaret Roggero (mezzo-soprano), Leslie Chabay (tenor), Yi-Kwei Sze (bass), Harvard Glee Club, Radcliffe Choral Society (artistic director: G. Wallace Woodworth), Boston Symphony Orchestra, Charles Munch (conductor). RCA Records.
- Paul Paray: Mass for the 500th Anniversary of the Death of Joan of Arc. Frances Yeend (soprano), Frances Bible (mezzo), David Lloyd (tenor), Yi-Kwei-Sze (bass) with the Rackham Symphony Choir and Detroit Symphony Orchestra, Paul Paray
- Chants Chinois (Chinese songs) : 1. Traditional "All Red The River" (滿江紅). 2. Qing Zhu to poem of Li Zhiyi (1035–1117) "Separated by the Yangtze River" (我住長江頭，君住長江尾). 3 Traditional to lyrics of Tao Xingzhi (1891–1946) "Song of the Hoe" (鋤頭歌) 4. Liu Xue'an to poem of Cao Xueqin "Song of the Red Bean" (紅豆詞). 5. He Luting, Hongliang Duanmu (1912–1996) "On the Jialing River" (嘉陵江上) 6. Zhao Yuanren (趙元任), to lyrics of Liu Bannong "How can I not think of her" (教我如何不想她) 7. "Drinking Song" (奠酒歌). 8 Liu Xue'an, to lyrics of Pan Jienong, "Ballad of the Great Wall" (長城謠). All tracks with Nancy Lee piano. Guilde internationale du disque, 10" LP, France.

== External list ==
- Yi-Kwei Sze playlist on YouTube
