= Zhiyi (given name) =

Zhiyi is a Chinese unisex given name. Notable people with the given name include:

- Zhiyi (538–597), Chinese Buddhist patriarch
- Chen Zhiyi (born 1984; Chinese: 陈致逸; pinyin: Chén Zhìyì), Chinese composer
- Fan Zhiyi (born 1969; Chinese: 范志毅; pinyin: Fàn Zhìyì), Chinese soccer player
- Gong Zhiyi (born 1988, simplified Chinese: 龚芝怡; traditional Chinese: 龔芝怡; pinyin: Gōng Zhīyí, also Serene Koong), Singaporean singer-songwriter-producer
- Huang Zhiyi (born 1981; Chinese: 黄志毅), Chinese soccer player
- Li Zhiyi (1048–1117; Chinese: 李之儀), Song dynasty Chinese poet
- Long Zhiyi (1929–2021; Chinese: 龙志毅), Chinese novelist and politician
- Wang Zhiyi (born 2000; Chinese: 王祉怡; pinyin: Wáng Zhǐyí), Chinese badminton player
- Wei Zhiyi (circa 9th-century; Chinese: 韋執誼), Song dynasty Chinese politician and historian
- Yan Zhiyi (523–591; Chinese: 颜之仪), Chinese politician
- Zhang Zhiyi (born 1999; simplified Chinese: 张至仪; traditional Chinese: 張至儀, also Maria Zhang), Chinese-Polish actress

== See also ==
- Yi Zhi (fl. c. 17th-century BCE), Chinese politician
- Zhi (disambiguation)
- Yi (disambiguation)
- Ziyi (disambiguation) including Zi Yi
- Yizhi (disambiguation) including Yi Zhi
