= Yizhi =

Yizhi or Yi Zhi may refer to:

== Places ==
- Yizhi Township (simplified Chinese: 益智乡; traditional Chinese: 益智鄉; pinyin: Yìzhì-zhèn), Jinggu, Yi, Yunnan, China

== People ==
Surname "Yi" Given name "Zhi"

- Yi Zhi (♂, circa 17th-century BCE; pinyin: Yī Zhì), a Shang dynasty Chinese politician

Given name "Yizhi" and "Yi-Zhi"

- Yan Yuan (Qing dynasty) (♂, 1635–1704, known as "Yizhi"), Qing dynasty Chinese philosopher
- Yizhi (prince) (♂, 1827–1850; Chinese: 瑞敏郡王奕志; pinyin: Ruìmǐn-jùn Wáng Yìzhì; lit. 'Wang Yizhi of Ruimin County'), Qing dynasty imperial prince
- Dexmon Chua Yizhi (♂, 1976–2013; Chinese: 蔡谊志; pinyin: Caì Yìzhì, also Dexmon Chua), Singaporean materials analyst and murder victim
- Cheng Yizhi (♀, 1902–1997; Chinese: 程毅志), Chinese politician
- Dou Yizhi (♂, died 833 CE; Chinese: 竇易直), Tang dynasty Chinese politician
- Juzhi Yizhi (♂, 9th-century CE; Chinese: 俱胝一指; pinyin: Jùzhī Yīzhǐ; Japanese pronunciation: Gutei Isshi), Chinese Buddhist Chan/Zen Master
- Li Yizhi (♀, born 1977), Chinese volleyball player
- Liu Yizhi (♂, 631–687; Chinese: 劉禕之), Tang dynasty Chinese politician
- Qin Yizhi (♂, born 1965; Chinese: 秦宜智), Chinese politician
- Yizhi Jane Tao, Chinese biochemist
- Zhang Yizhi (♂, died 705 CE; Chinese: 張易之), Duke of Heng; Zhou dynasty Chinese politician

== Fictional and mythological characters ==
- Yizhi (Chinese: 儀質), a wuxia character from The Smiling, Proud Wanderer by Jin Yong
- Ping Yizhi (Chinese: 平一指), a wuxia character from The Smiling, Proud Wanderer by Jin Yong
- Yizhi Nishidu (Chinese: 伊質泥師都), a legendary character, ancestor of all Turkic peoples, including the Ashina Tuwu

== Other uses ==
- Yizhi capsule, a type of traditional Chinese medicine

== See also ==
- Zhi (disambiguation)
- Yi (disambiguation)
- Zhiyi (disambiguation) including Zhi Yi
- Yizi (disambiguation) including Yi Zi
