= Loyalty to the Country =

Chinese patriotic song

"Loyalty to the Country" (simplified Chinese: 精忠报国; traditional Chinese: 精忠報國; pinyin: Jīngzhōng bàoguó) is a Chinese patriotic song paying tribute to the Han general Yue Fei, a popular Chinese folk hero. The name of the song refers to a phrase tattooed on the back of Yue Fei, and a mantra with which he is commonly identified. The lyrics of the song allude to the Jin–Song Wars, in which Yue Fei played a pivotal role.

== Basis ==
The title Loyalty to the Country refers to a popular semi-historical legend surrounding Yue Fei. According to these accounts, Yue Fei had the Chinese characters jin zhong bao guo (simplified Chinese: 尽忠报国; traditional Chinese: 盡忠報國; pinyin: jìn zhōng bào guó; literally: "serve the country with the utmost loyalty") tattooed across his back by his mother to ensure his dedication to the state. According to The Story of King Yue Who Restored the Song dynasty (《大宋中興岳王傳》), one of the earliest Ming era works chronicling the general, Yue Fei would show the tattoo to soldiers when he detected that they wished to desert, and he implored a number of his men to have the characters tattooed on their backs. The legend has undergone a number of fictionalisations across its centuries long history, and remains a popular element of Chinese folklore today.

== Lyrics ==
Simplified Chinese	Traditional Chinese	Pinyin	English Translation
狼烟起江山北望 龙起卷马长嘶剑气如霜 心似黄河水茫茫 二十年纵横间谁能相抗 恨欲狂长刀所向 多少手足忠魂埋骨它乡 何惜百死报家国 忍叹惜更无语血泪满眶 马蹄南去人北望 人北望草青黄尘飞扬 我愿守土复开疆 堂堂中国要让四方来贺	狼煙起江山北望 龍起卷馬長嘶劍氣如霜 心似黃河水茫茫 二十年縱橫間誰能相抗 恨欲狂長刀所向 多少手足忠魂埋骨它鄉 何惜百死報家國 忍嘆惜更無語血淚滿眶 馬蹄南去人北望 人北望草青黃塵飛揚 我願守土復開疆 堂堂中國要讓四方來賀	láng yān qǐ jiāng shān běi wàng lóng qǐ juàn mǎ cháng sī jiàn qì rú shuāng xīn sì huáng hé shuǐ máng máng èr shí nián zòng héng jiān shuí néng xiāng kàng hèn yù kuáng cháng dāo suǒ xiàng duō shǎo shǒu zú zhōng hún mái gǔ tā xiāng hé xī bǎi sǐ bào jiā guó rěn tàn xī gēng wú yǔ xuè lèi mǎn kuàng mǎ tí nán qù rén běi wàng rén běi wàng cǎo qīng huáng chén fēi yáng wǒ yuàn shǒu tǔ fù kāi jiāng táng táng zhōng guó yào ràng sì fāng lái hè	When the fiery smoke rises I look at the vast land towards the north， the roaring of the dragons and neighing of the horses are echoed by the chilling sword， my heart is as boundless as the water of the yellow river, who could challenge the power in the past twenty years hatred is driving me towards madness. Where my wide sword points, countless brothers with loyal souls buried their bones in unfamiliar lands, all would die a hundred times to protect the country and the land, I sigh with the deepest regret, yet I could not find a word to say, only blood and tear fill my eyes The horses runs towards the south, but the people look towards the north Towards the north, the grass are just dry and yellow, with dusts flying high I am willing to station here and re-claim my land The mighty China should be paid tributes and respect

== See also ==
- Jin-Song Wars
- Yue Fei
- The Great Wall Ballad
- "Ode to the Motherland"
