= Yizi =

Yizi or Yi Zi may refer to:

== Places ==
- Yizi Subdistrict, Panzhou, Guizhou, China
- Yizi Hutong, Shichahai, Beijing, China; a historic hutong villa
- Yizi Lane, Haishu, Ningbo, Zhejiang, China; near Daqing Bridge station
- Yizi (Chinese: 夷子ㄧ), a minor Chinese state; see List of dynasties

== People ==
- Yizi people, a native group of Guizhou, China\

=== Persons ===
Given name "Yizi" or "Yi-Zi"

- Lili Han Yizi (born 1956; Chinese: 韩仪子; pinyin: Hán Yǐzi, also Lili Han), wife of Singaporean politician and businessman Zeng Guoyuan
- Li Yizi (3rd century CE; Chinese: 李移子), a personage of the Three Kingdoms period'; see List of people of the Three Kingdoms (L)
- Meng Yizi (circa 5th century BCE), Confucian scholar, brother of Nangong Kuo (disciple of Confucius)
- Zhu Yizi (1537-1559; Chinese: 朱翊錙), heir apparent to the princely title of Prince of Zhao (Ming dynasty), but died before the holder of the seat died
- Zhu Yizi (1595-1650), the Prince of Chongxin of the House of Prince of Qin (Ming dynasty)

== See also ==
- Yi (disambiguation)
- Zi (disambiguation)
- Ziyi (disambiguation), including Zi Yi
- Yizhi (disambiguation), including Yi Zhi
