= Zhu Shangbing =

Chinese prince (1380–1412)

Zhu Shangbing 朱尚炳

Prince of Qin
- Tenure: 1395–1412
- Predecessor: Zhu Shuang, Prince Min
- Successor: Zhu Zhigeng, Prince Xi
- Born: 25 November 1380
- Died: 21 April 1412 (aged 31)
- Issue: Zhu Zhijun, Prince Huai of Qin; Zhu Zhigeng, Prince Xi of Qin; Zhu Zhiqie, Prince Kang of Qin; Zhu Zhibao, Prince Zhuangjing of Yichuan; Princess Luonan; Princess Hancheng; Princess Huayin
Names
- Zhu Shangbing (朱尚炳)
Posthumous name
- Prince Yin (隱王)
- House: Zhu
- Father: Zhu Shuang
- Mother: Lady Deng

Zhu Shangbing (Chinese: 朱尚炳; 25 November 1380 – 21 April 1412), posthumous name Prince Yin of Qin (秦隱王), was a prince of the Chinese Ming dynasty. He was the eldest son of Zhu Shuang (Prince Min of Qin), the ninth grandson of the Hongwu Emperor, and the maternal grandson of Deng Yu.

In 1395, he inherited the noble title of Prince of Qin and became the first hereditary prince (世子) in the Ming dynasty to inherit the title of prince (藩王). Zhu Shangbing once suppressed the rebellion of Gao Fuxing (高福興), a native of Mian County (沔縣).

== Consorts and issue ==
- Consort Zheng, of the Liu clan (正妃劉氏), daughter of Liu Sui (刘遂)
  - Zhu Zhigeng, Prince Xi of Qin (秦僖王朱志堩, 1404 － 1424), second son
- Furen, of the Tang clan (唐夫人)
  - Zhu Zhijun, Prince Huai of Qin (秦懷王朱志均, 1403 － 1426), first son
  - Zhu Zhiqie, Prince Kang of Qin (秦康王朱志𡐤, 1404 － 1455), third son
- Unknown
  - Zhu Zhibao, Prince Zhuangjing of Yichuan (宜川莊靖王朱志堢, 1410 – 18 September 1448), fourth son
  - Princess Luonan (洛南郡主), first daughter
  - Princess Hancheng (韓城郡主), second son
  - Princess Huayin (華陰郡主), third daughter

Zhu Shangbing House of Zhu Born: 25 November 1380 Died: 21 April 1412
Chinese royalty
Preceded by Zhu Shuang, Prince Min of Qin	Prince of Qin; 1395–1412	Succeeded by Zhu Zhigeng, Prince Xi of Qin
