= Zhu Shuang =

Chinese prince (1356–1395)

Zhu Shuang 朱樉
- Prince of Qin
- Born: 3 December 1356; Yingtian, Yuan dynasty
- Died: 9 April 1395 (aged 38); Xi'an, Ming dynasty
- Spouse: Lady Wang
- Issue Detail: Zhu Shangbing, Prince Yin of Qin
Posthumous name
- Prince Min of Qin (Note: Chinese: 秦愍王; pinyin: Qín Mǐnwáng)
- House: Zhu
- Father: Hongwu Emperor
- Mother: Empress Ma

Chinese name
- Chinese: 朱樉
Transcriptions
Standard Mandarin
- Hanyu Pinyin: Zhū Shuǎng

Zhu Shuang (3 December 1356 – 9 April 1395) was an imperial prince of the Ming dynasty of China. He was the second son of the founding ruler, the Hongwu Emperor. In May 1370, the Emperor granted him the title of Prince of Qin, with a princely fiefdom in modern-day Xi'an. Zhu Shuang became one of the most powerful Ming princes, commanding troops along the empire's northwestern frontier. Following the death of his elder brother Zhu Biao, the heir apparent, in 1392, he was briefly considered a possible heir to the Hongwu Emperor, but his violent temperament and repeated abuses of power undermined his prospects. Zhu Shuang ultimately died after leading a military campaign in Tibet.

== Biography ==
Zhu Shuang was born on 3 December 1356, as the second son of Zhu Yuanzhang and his primary wife, Lady Ma. At the time, Zhu Yuanzhang was based in Nanjing and was a prominent rebel leader during the Red Turban Rebellion, an uprising in China against the Mongol-led Yuan dynasty. The rebellion sought to restore Han Chinese rule after decades of Mongol domination following the Yuan conquest of the Song in 1279. In 1368, Zhu Yuanzhang founded the Ming dynasty and became the Hongwu Emperor. In May 1370, the Emperor bestowed the title of prince (王; wang) upon nine of his sons, including Zhu Shuang who became the Prince of Qin (秦王).

In October 1371, Zhu Shuang married the sister of the Mongol warlord Köke Temür, but the marriage did not produce the desired results, as Köke remained a threat to the Ming. Zhu Shuang favored his secondary consort, the daughter of the general Deng Yu. Lady Deng became the prince's concubine in late 1375.

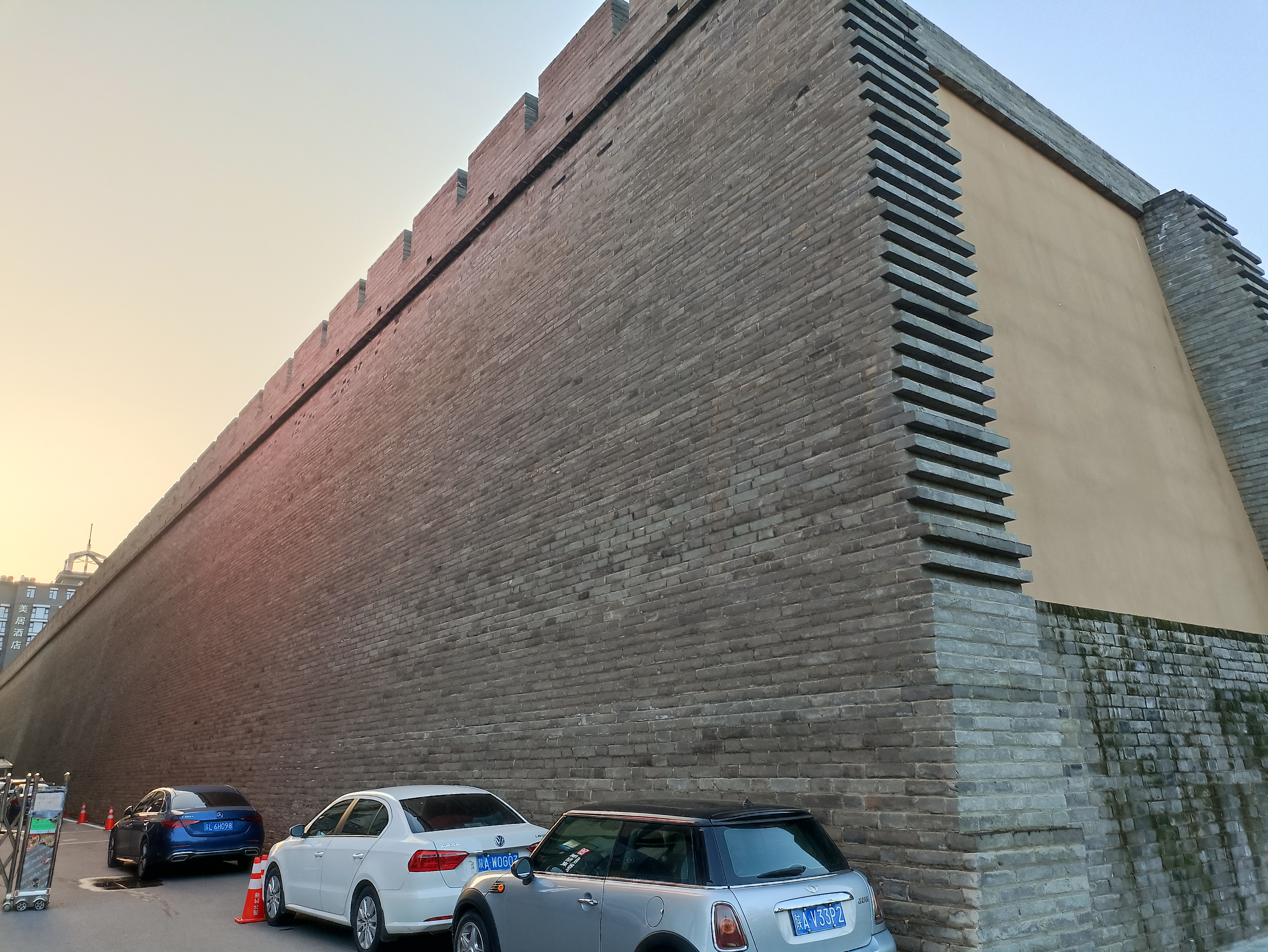
The wall of Zhu Shuang's residence in Xi'an

Upon reaching adulthood in April 1378, Zhu Shuang moved to Xi'an, the center of the former Qin dynasty and now the capital of Shaanxi province. Although he had no official authority over the local administration, he had a personal guard consisting of three regiments and a large household led by experienced advisors and officials such as Zheng Jiucheng (鄭九成), Wang Kerang (王克讓), and Wen Yuanji (文原吉). This gave him considerable power. From the late 1380s, he was one of several sons of the Emperor who were given command of the border troops on the northern and northwestern borders. In 1389, the Emperor also appointed him as the director of the Imperial Clan Court.

After the death in 1392 of his elder brother Zhu Biao, the heir to the throne, Zhu Shuang was seen as a potential heir, but the Emperor's advisors, particularly Liu Sanwu (劉三吾; 1312–1399), advocated for the appointment of Zhu Biao's young son, Zhu Yunwen. While Zhu Biao had been trained to be a Confucian ruler through gentleness and primarily civilian means, Zhu Shuang was primarily a general who fought against the Mongols and had many Mongol mercenaries in his service. Zhu Yunwen was surrounded by literati and officials, and his selection promised to continue the intended trend of civilizing and moderating the government. The Emperor and his court also had reservations about appointing Zhu Shuang as heir due to his violent nature, numerous instances of abuse of power, and minor and major offenses. (Note: For example, Zhu Shuang was accused of 37 offenses, probably dating from 1387 to 1392, including bullying officials and commoners and colluding to cheat and confiscate property. For a full list of the 37 offenses, see Chan (2007), pp. 65–69.)

In early 1395, Zhu Shuang led a military expedition against the Tibetans. Shortly after his return, he died in Xi'an on 9 April 1395. While the History of Ming does not mention Zhu Shuang's cause of death, a letter from the Hongwu Emperor in the Taizu Huangdi Qinlu (太祖皇帝欽錄; 'Private Records of the Emperor Taizu') suggests that the prince may have been poisoned. Three years later, in 1398, his nephew Zhu Yunwen succeeded the Hongwu Emperor as the Jianwen Emperor.

== Family ==
- Consort Minlie (愍烈妃) of the Wang clan (王氏; d. 1395), primary consort; younger sister of Köke Temür. She committed suicide through the traditional practice of following her deceased husband in death. (Note: A practice known as xun (殉))
- Lady Deng (鄧氏), secondary consort; daughter of Deng Yu. She predeceased Zhu Shuang, committing suicide by hanging after being reprimanded by the prince for jealousy.
  - Zhu Shangbing (朱尚炳), Prince Yin of Qin (秦隱王; 25 November 1380 – 21 April 1412), first son
  - Zhu Shanglie (朱尚烈), Prince Yijian of Yongxing (永興懿簡王; 29 September 1384 – 22 February 1417), second son
  - Zhu Shangyu (朱尚煜), Prince Daoxi of Bao'an (保安悼僖王; 20 November 1385 – 25 February 1410), third son
- Lady Zhang (張氏)
  - Zhu Shangzhou (朱尚烐), Prince Gongjing of Xingping (興平恭靖王; 19 October 1389 – 15 May 1449), fourth son
- Unknown
  - Zhu Shanghong (朱尚灴), Prince Huaijian of Yongshou (永壽懷簡王; 17 April 1390 – 19 September 1420), fifth son
  - Zhu Shangkai (朱尚炌), Prince of Anding (安定王; b. 4 December 1394), sixth son (Note: Later stripped of his title)
  - Princess Pucheng (蒲城郡主), first daughter. Married to Wu Lun (吳倫).
  - Princess Chang'an (長安郡主), second daughter. Married to Ru Jian (茹鑒), son of Ru Chang (茹瑺).

== Notes ==
Zhu Shuang House of Zhu Born: 3 December 1356 Died: 9 April 1395
Chinese royalty
New creation	Prince of Qin; 1378–1395	Succeeded by Zhu Shangbing
