= Ziyi =

Ziyi or Zi Yi may refer to:

== Places ==
- Ziyi, Cyprus or Zygi, a village in the south of Cyprus between Limassol and Larnaca
- Zi Yi (子一), a star also called Lambda Columbae

== People with the mononym ==
- Sima Liang (227–291), known as Ziyi (子翼), a regent during the Jin Dynasty
- Sima Lun (250–301), known as Ziyi (子彛), Emperor of Jin
- Wang Yanhan (died 927), known as Ziyi (子逸), King of Min
- Ziyi 281 (紫伊281), author of the online novel Cinderella Chef

== People with the given name ==
- Fang Ziyi (1917–2015), Chinese airforce general
- Guo Ziyi (697–781), Chinese general during the Tang Dynasty
- Kerk Chee Yee (郭子毅) also known as Guo Zi Yi; Malaysian politician
- Luo Zi Yi (born 1984), Hong Kong actor
- Niu Ziyi (born 1999), Chinese soccer player
- Wang Ziyi (born 1996; stagename: BOOGIE), Chinese rapper
- Lulu Wang (filmmaker) (born 1983; 王子逸) also known as Wang Ziyi; Chinese-American filmmaker
- Yang Ziyi (born 1995), Chinese soccer player
- Zhang Ziyi (born 1979), Chinese actress
- Zhang Ziyi (zootechnician) (1925–2022), Chinese academician

=== Fictional characters ===
- Wang Zi Yi, a character from Ti Amo Chocolate
- Yuan Ziyi, a character in Other Tales of the Flying Fox
- Zhang Zi Yi (张姿宜), a character from Table of Glory

== Other uses ==
- Ziyi, Chapter 33 in the Classic of Rites
- Zi Yi (子彝), a dialect of Naruo language
- Ziyi (子彝), a dialect of Lavu language

== See also ==
- Yizi (disambiguation), including Yi Zi
- Zhiyi (disambiguation)
