= Zhu Zhiqie =

Chinese prince (1404–1455)

Zhu Zhiqie 朱志𡐤

Prince of Qin
- Tenure: 1428–1455
- Predecessor: Zhu Zhijun, Prince Huai
- Successor: Zhu Gongxi, Prince Hui

Prince of Fuping
- Tenure: 1422–1428
- Born: 1404
- Died: 1455 (aged 50–51)
- Issue: Zhu Gongming, Prince An of Qin; Zhu Gongtang, Prince Huigong of Heyang; Zhu Gongcheng, Prince Duanyi of Qianyang; Zhu Gongxi, Prince Hui of Qin; Zhu Gongjiang; Princess Yanchuan; Princess Chengcheng Princess Shiquan; Princess Baoji
Posthumous name
- Prince Kang (康王)
- House: Zhu
- Father: Zhu Shangbing
- Mother: Lady Tang

Zhu Zhiqie (Chinese: 朱志𡐤; 1404–1455), posthumous name Prince Kang of Qin, was a prince of China's Ming dynasty. He was the son of Zhu Shangbing (Prince Yin of Qin) and Lady Tang. He was the younger brother of Zhu Zhijun (Prince Huai of Qin) and Zhu Zhigeng (Prince Xi of Qin). In 1422, he was made Prince of Fuping (富平王), and in 1428, he inherited the title of Prince of Qin.

Zhu Zhiqie died in 1455. Three years later, the Qin principality was inherited by his son, Zhu Gongxi (Prince Hui of Qin).

== Consorts and issue ==
- Primary consort, of the Chen clan (陳氏, d. 1472), (Note: In 1426, she was made Princess of Fuping (富平王妃), and in 1428, she was made Princess Kang of Qin (秦康王妃).) Deputy Commander of the West City Wardens Chen Zheng's (西城兵馬副指揮 陳政) daughter
  - Zhu Chengxi, Prince Hui of Qin (秦惠王 朱公錫; 1437–1486), fourth son
- Lady, of the Yang clan (夫人 杨氏)
- Lady, of the Zhou clan (夫人 周氏)
  - Zhu Gongming, Prince An of Qin (秦安王 朱公銘; 14 October 1431 – 26 September 1474), first son
- Lady, of the Pan clan (夫人 潘氏)
  - Zhu Gongtang, Prince Huigong of Heyang (郃陽惠恭王 朱公鏜; 9 September 1432 – 23 December 1471), second son
  - Zhu Gongcheng, Prince Duanyi of Qianyang (汧陽端懿王 朱公鏳; 10 February 1436 – 29 June 1495), third son
- Unknown
  - Zhu Gongjiang (朱公鍵), died young, fifth son
  - Princess Yanchuan (延川郡主), first daughter
    - Married Liu Zhen (劉振)
  - Princess Chengcheng (澄城郡主), second daughter
    - Married Li Xun (李恂)
  - Princess Shiquan (石泉郡主), third daughter
    - Married Li Yu (李裕)
  - Princess Baoji (寶雞郡主), fourth daughter
    - Married Fan Ying (樊瑛)

== Notes ==
Zhu Zhiqie House of Zhu Born: 1404 Died: 1455
Chinese royalty
Preceded by Title created	Prince of Fuping; 1422–1428	Succeeded by None
Preceded by Zhu Zhijun, Prince Kang	Prince of Qin; 1428–1455	Succeeded by Zhu Gongxi, Prince Hui
