= Zhu Zhijun =

Chinese prince (1403–1426)

Zhu Zhijun 朱志均

Prince of Qin
- Tenure: 1424–1426
- Predecessor: Zhu Zhigeng, Prince Xi
- Successor: Zhu Zhiqie, Prince Kang

Prince of Weinan
- Tenure: 1403–1424
- Born: 1403
- Died: 1426 (aged 22–23)
Posthumous name
- Prince Huai (懷王)
- House: Zhu
- Father: Zhu Shangbing
- Mother: Lady Tang

Zhu Zhijun (Chinese: 朱志均; 1403–1426), posthumous name Prince Huai of Qin (秦懷王), was a prince of the Chinese Ming dynasty. He was the son of Zhu Shangbing (Prince Yin of Qin), and the elder brother of Zhu Zhigeng (Prince Xi of Qin). In 1403, he was made Prince of Weinan (渭南王), and in 1424, he inherited the title of Prince of Qin.

Zhu Zhijun died in 1426 at the age of 24. His fiancée, Lady Zhang, entered the palace and vowed to remain chaste for the rest of her life, as he had no son. His younger full-brother, Zhu Zhiqie (Prince Kang of Qin), succeeded him.

Zhu Zhijun House of Zhu Born: 1403 Died: 1426
Chinese royalty
Preceded by Title created	Prince of Weinan; 1403–1424	Succeeded by None
Preceded by Zhu Zhigeng, Prince Xi	Prince of Qin; 1424–1426	Succeeded by Zhu Zhiqie, Prince Kang
