= Liu Xue'an =

Chinese composer

Liu Xue'an (刘雪庵 1905–1985), whose pen names were Yan Ru (晏如), Wu Qing (吴青), and Su Ya (苏崖) was a Chinese composer. Among his best known songs include "The Great Wall Ballad", "When Will You Return?," and "Red Bean Poem" (红豆词).

He taught at the Sunan College of Education in Suzhou, the music department of the East China University in Shanghai and at the Arts Normal College and the Conservatory of Chinese.

Liu was criticized and suffered during the Anti-Rightist Campaign in 1957 and during the Cultural Revolution in the 1960s. He offered a public self-criticism in 1980 before he was rehabilitated, however criticism of his song "When Will You Return?" continued in mainland China for some time as an example of "yellow music", a product of decadent and immoral society.
