= The Great Wall Ballad =

Song

The Great Wall Ballad (simplified Chinese: 长城谣; traditional Chinese: 長城謠; pinyin: Chángchéng yáo) is a Chinese patriotic song written in 1937 by Pan Jienong and Liu Xue'an after the Marco Polo Bridge Incident. The song became extremely popular among both the Chinese Communist Party and the Nationalists, and quickly rose to prominence among the Chinese Diaspora. Today, the Great Wall Ballad is one of the most popular Chinese patriotic songs in both Taiwan and Mainland China, largely due to its apolitical lyrics and folk-style melody. The song has been adapted numerous times across its history, and is sometimes seen as the de facto anthem of the Chinese diaspora.

== History ==
The Great Wall Ballad was written to appear as a musical number in the 1937 Huayi Film Company production Kanshan Wanli. However, after the Japanese annexation of Shanghai, production on the film was ceased. After fleeing to Northern China, one of the lead producers of the film, Lu Xuebiao, published the script and music of Kanshan Wanli in Warsong Magazine, a popular Chinese resistance publication. The Great Wall Ballad became a popular melody among the readers, and it was disseminated by a large number of anti-Japanese propagandists across China. As the war progressed, the song became increasingly well known, and was performed internationally by Zhou Xiaoyian, an acclaimed Chinese choral singer, alongside the remainder of the soundtrack to Kanshan Wanli. These international performances made the Great Wall Ballad a favourite among the Chinese diaspora, and it remains a well-known piece among diaspora communities globally.

In 1957, Liu Xue'an was denounced by the Chinese Communist Party as a rightist, and his works, including the Great Wall Ballad, were banned for 22 years. During this period, the song continued to increase in popularity in Taiwan and Hong Kong, and by the time that ban was lifted in 1979, it had become well-established across the Sinosphere. The song remains popular in both Mainland China and Taiwan to this day, and was featured during the Chinese bid to host the 2022 Winter Olympics.

== Lyrics ==
Simplified Chinese	Traditional Chinese	Pinyin	English Translation
万里长城万里长， 长城外面是故乡。 高粱肥，大豆香， 遍地黄金少灾殃。 自从大难平地起， 奸淫掳掠苦难当。 苦难当，奔他方， 骨肉离散父母丧。 没齿难忘仇和恨， 日夜只想回故乡。 大家拼命打回去， 哪怕倭寇逞豪强。 万里长城万里长， 长城外面是故乡。 四万万同胞心一条， 新的长城万里长。 万里长城万里长， 长城外面是故乡。 四万万同胞心一条， 新的长城万里长。	萬里長城萬里長， 長城外面是故鄉。 高粱肥，大豆香， 遍地黃金少災殃。 自從大難平地起， 姦淫擄掠苦難當。 苦難當，奔他方， 骨肉離散父母喪。 沒齒難忘仇和恨， 日夜只想回故鄉。 大家拼命打回去， 哪怕倭寇逞豪強。 萬里長城萬里長， 長城外面是故鄉。 四萬萬同胞心一條， 新的長城萬里長。 萬里長城萬里長， 長城外面是故鄉。 四萬萬同胞心一條， 新的長城萬里長。	wàn lǐ cháng chéng wàn lǐ cháng, cháng chéng wài miàn shì gù xiāng. gāo liáng féi, dà dòu xiāng , biàn dì huáng jīn shǎo zāi yāng. zì cóng dà nán píng dì qǐ, jiān yín lǔ lüè kǔ nán dāng. kǔ nán dāng, bēn tā fāng, gǔ ròu lí sàn fù mǔ sāng. mò chǐ nán wàng chóu hé hèn, rì yè zhī xiǎng huí gù xiāng. dà jiā pīn mìng dǎ huí qù, nǎ pà wō kòu chěng háo qiáng. wàn lǐ cháng chéng wàn lǐ cháng, cháng chéng wài miàn shì gù xiāng. sì wàn wàn tóng bāo xīn yī tiáo, xīn dí cháng chéng wàn lǐ cháng. wàn lǐ cháng chéng wàn lǐ cháng, cháng chéng wài miàn shì gù xiāng. sì wàn wàn tóng bāo xīn yī tiáo, xīn dí cháng chéng wàn lǐ cháng.	Ten thousand li is the Great Wall long, Behind the Great Wall is my hometown. The sorghum was rich and the soybeans fragrant, Gold was all over the land, with no disasters. Since the great catastrophe began, The rape and looting was too bitter to endure Hardship drove us to foreign lands Fragmented, our kinfolk and parents died. I shall never forget the avengement and enmity I just want to go back to my hometown day and night. We must all fight to protect our homeland No matter how the Japanese enemy shows their tyranny Ten thousand li is the Great Wall long, Behind the Great Wall is my hometown . 400 million compatriots share one heart. The new Great Wall is ten thousand li long. Ten thousand li is the Great Wall long, Behind the Great Wall is my hometown . 400 million compatriots share one heart. The new Great Wall is ten thousand li long.

== See also ==
- "Ode to the Motherland"
- "Ode to the Republic of China"
- "The East Is Red (song)"
- "The Plum Blossom"
