= Prince of Qin (Ming dynasty) =

Member of the Chinese Ming Royal family

Prince of Qin (Chinese: 秦王) was a first-rank princely peerage of the Ming dynasty. The princedom was created by the Hongwu Emperor for his second son, Zhu Shuang.

== Generation names / poem ==
The generation poem given by Hongwu Emperor was:

"Shang Zhi Gong Cheng Bing, Wei Huai Jing Yi Cun, Fu Si Zi Lian Zhi, Kuang Shi Yong Xin Dun"
尚志公誠秉，惟懷敬誼存，輔嗣資廉直，匡時永信惇

The mainline members used the poem until the name "Cun" (存), which was the same generation as Tianqi Emperor and Chongzhen Emperor.

== Princedom of Qin ==
Princedom of Qin 秦王
- Creation date: 1378
- Creation: first creation
- Created by: Hongwu Emperor
- Peerage: 1st-rank princely peerage for imperial son of Ming Dynasty
- First holder: Zhu Shuang, Prince Min
- Last holder: Zhu Cunfu, 16th Prince of Qin
- Status: Extinct
- Extinction date: 1649
- Seats: Xi'an, Shaanxi

- - Prince of Qin
- - Hereditary Prince of Qin

- Zhu Shuang (朱樉; 3 Dec 1356 – 9 Apr 1395) (1st), Hongwu Emperor's second son. He was made Prince of Qin in 1370 by his father and took his fief in 1378, which was located at Xi'an. His full posthumous name was Prince Min of Qin (秦愍王)
  - Zhu Shangbing (朱尚炳; 25 Nov 1380 – 21 Apr 1412) (2nd), Zhu Shuang's eldest son, he succeeded the princedom from 1395 to 1412. His full posthumous name was Prince Yin of Qin (秦隱王)
    - Zhu Zhijun (朱志均; 1403–1426) (4th), Zhu Shangbing's eldest son from his secondary consort. He initially was made a second-rank prince under the title Prince of Weinan Comm. (渭南郡王) from 1403 to 1424. He succeeded the princedom from 1424 to 1426. He died childlessly and was succeeded by his younger full-brother. His full posthumous name was Prince Huai of Qin (秦懷王)
    - Zhu Zhigeng (朱志堩; 1404–1424) (3rd), Zhu Shuang's second son and eldest son from his primary consort. He succeeded the princedom from 1412 to 1424. He died childlessly and was succeeded by his elder half-brother. His full posthumous name was Prince Xi of Qin (秦僖王)
    - Zhu Zhiqie (朱志𡐤; 1404–1455) (5th), Zhu Shuang's third son. He initially was made a second-rank prince under the title Prince of Fuping Comm. (富平郡王) from 1422 to 1428. He succeeded the princedom from 1428 to 1455. His full posthumous name was Prince Kang of Qin (秦康王)
      - Zhu Gongming, Zhu Zhiqie's eldest son. He was made Prince of Lintong Comm. in his lifetime. He was posthumously honoured as a Prince of Qin under the posthumous title "Prince An of Qin" (秦安王) after his grandson succeeded the princedom of Qin.
        - Zhu Chengrun, Zhu Gongming's eldest son. He was made a defender general under the designation of Prince of Lintong Comm. He was posthumously honoured as a Prince of Qin under the posthumous title "Prince Gong of Qin" (秦恭王) after his great-grandson succeeded the princedom of Qin.
          - Zhu Bingfu, Zhu Chengrun's second son. He was made a bulwark general under the designation of Prince of Lintong Comm. He was posthumously honoured as a Prince of Qin under the posthumous title "Prince Shun of Qin" (秦順王) after his grandson succeeded the princedom of Qin.
            - Zhu Weilian, Zhu Bingfu's second son. He was made a supporter general under the designation of Prince of Lintong Comm. He was posthumously honoured as Prince of Qin under the posthumous title "Prince Duan of Qin" (秦端王) after his son succeeded the princedom.
              - Zhu Huaiquan (朱懷埢; 1524–1566) (10th). He initially was made a defender lieutenant under the designation of Prince of Lintong Comm. He succeeded the princedom from 1548 to 1566. His full posthumous name was Prince Xuan of Qin (秦宣王)
                - Zhu Jingrong (朱敬鎔; 1541–1576) (11th), Zhu Huaiquan's eldest son. He initially was made a second-rank prince under the title Prince of Longde Comm. (隆德郡王) from 1550 to 1569. He succeeded the princedom from 1569 to 1576. His full posthumous name was Prince Jing of Qin (秦靖王)
                  - Zhu Yihan (朱誼澏; d.1586) (12th), Zhu Jingrong's eldest son. He was designated hereditary prince in 1575 and succeeded the princedom from 1581 to 1586. He died childlessly and was succeeded by his younger brother. His full posthumous name was Prince Jing of Qin (秦敬王)
                  - Zhu Yihuan (朱誼漶) (13th), Zhu Jingrong's third son. He initially was made a supporter lieutenant in 1585, then promoted to the rank of second-rank prince under the title Prince of Ziyang Comm. (紫陽郡王). He succeeded the princedom from 1587 to before 1637. His posthumous name was Prince Su of Qin (秦肅王)
                    - Zhu Cunshu (朱存樞; 22 Feb 1592 – 29 Mar 1629), Zhu Yihuan's eldest son, was designated hereditary prince from 1616 to 1629, died before his father and sonlessly.
                    - Zhu Cunji (朱存機; 8 Sep 1595 – 17 Mar 1641) (14th), Zhu Yihuan's third son. He initially was made a supporter lieutenant in 1626, then promoted to the rank of commandery prince. He was designated hereditary prince in 1629 and succeeded the princedom from 1637 to 1641. He died childlessly and was succeeded by his younger brother. His full posthumous name was Prince Jing of Qin (秦景王)
                    - Zhu Cunji (朱存極; d.1643) (15th), initially was made a supporter lieutenant in 1626, then promoted to the rank of commandery prince. He succeeded the princedom from 1641 and surrendered to Li Zicheng in 1643. He later surrenders to Qing dynasty in 1644 and was executed by the Qing court in May 1646, at Caishikou Execution Grounds. He had no child or posthumous name.
                    - Zhu Cunfu (朱存; d.1649; 16th), he initially was honoured as Prince of Hanzhong Comm. (漢中郡王) by Sun Shoufa (孫守法) from 1645 to 1649. He was then honoured as the Prince of Qin in 1649 by Zhao Ronggui (趙榮貴). He plunged himself at Zishui River (紫水河). He had no child or posthumous name.
                - Zhu Jingzhen (朱敬鉁; 2 Jan 1555 – 14 Jan 1560), Zhu Huaiquan's second son, died to smallpox and was posthumously created the title of hereditary prince.
        - Zhu Chengcan, Zhu Gongming's fourth son and eldest son from his primary consort. He succeeded the second-rank Princedom of Lintong Comm. He was posthumously honoured as a Prince of Qin under the posthumous title "Prince Zhuang of Qin" (秦莊王) after his second son succeeded the princedom of Qin.
          - Zhu Bingshuang (朱秉欆; 1481–1501) (8th), Zhu Chengcan's second son. He initially succeeded the second-rank princedom of Lintong Comm. He then succeeded the princedom of Qin from 1500 to 1501. His full posthumous name was Prince Zhao of Qin (秦昭王)
            - Zhu Weichao (朱惟焯; 1499–1544) (9th), he succeeded the princedom from 1510 to 1544. He died childlessly and was succeeded by his second cousin once removed, Zhu Huaiquan. His full posthumous name was Prince Ding of Qin (秦定王)
      - Zhu Gongxi (朱公錫; 1437–1486) (6th), Zhu Zhiqie's fourth son and eldest son from his primary consort. He succeeded the princedom from 1458 to 1486. His full posthumous name was Prince Hui of Qin (秦惠王)
        - Zhu Chengyong (朱誠泳; 1454 - 1498) (7th), Zhu Gongxi's last surviving son. He initially was made a second-rank prince under the title Prince of Zhen'an Comm. (鎮安郡王) from 1468 to 1488. He succeeded the princedom from 1488 to 1498. He died childlessly and was succeeded by his first cousin once removed (see above). His full posthumous name was Prince Jian of Qin (秦簡王)

Genealogy of Princedom of Qin (w/a Princedom of Lintong Comm.)

Hongwu Emperor
2nd son
Zhu Shuang; 1356–1395; Prince Min of Qin^{1} 秦愍王; 1370–1395
1st son
Zhu Shangbing 朱尚炳; 1380−1412; Prince Yin of Qin ^{2} 秦隱王; 1395–1412
1st son	2nd son (1st son of primary consort)	3rd son
Zhu Zhijun 朱志均; 1403–1426; Prince Huai of Qin ^{4} 秦怀王; 1424–1426	Zhu Zhigeng 朱志堩; 1404–1424; Prince Xi of Qin ^{3} 秦僖王; 1412–1424	Zhu Zhiqie 朱志𡐤; 1404–1455; Prince Kang of Qin ^{5} 秦康王; 1428–1455
1st son	4th son (1st son of primary consort)
Zhu Gongming 朱公铭; 1431–1474; Prince Huijian of Lintong Comm. "Prince An of Qin" 秦安王 (posthumously honoured in 1538)	Zhu Gongxi 朱公锡; 1437–1486; Prince Hui of Qin 秦惠王; 6th Prince of Qin; 1458–1486
1st son	4th son (1st son from primary consort)	1st son
Zhu Chengrun 朱诚润; Defender General of Lintong "Prince Gong of Qin" 秦恭王 (posthumously honoured in 1549)	Zhu Chengcan 朱诚澯; 1453–1493; Prince Hexi of Lintong Comm. "Prince Zhuang of Qin" 秦庄王 (posthumously honoured in 1538)	Zhu Chengyong 朱诚泳; 1458–1498; Prince Jian of Qin 秦简王; 7th Prince of Qin; 1488–1498
2nd son (1st son from primary consort)	2nd son
Zhu Bingfu 朱秉柎; Bulwark General of Lintong "Prince Shun of Qin" 秦順王 (posthumously honoured in 1549)	Zhu Bingshuang 朱秉欆; 1480–1501; Prince Zhao of Qin 秦昭王; 8th Prince of Qin; 1500–1501
Zhu Weilian 朱惟燫; Supporter General of Lintong "Prince Duan of Qin" 秦端王 (posthumously honoured in 1549)	Zhu Weichao 朱惟焯; 1499–1544; Prince Ding of Qin 秦定王; 9th Prince of Qin; 1509–1544
Zhu Huaiquan 朱懷埢; 1524–1566; Prince Xuan of Qin 秦宣王; 10th Prince of Qin; 1548–1566
1st son
Zhu Jingrong 朱敬镕; 1541–1576; Prince of Jing of Qin 秦靖王; 11th Prince of Qin; 1569–1576
1st son	3rd son
Zhu Yihan 朱谊澏 d.1586 Prine Jing of Qin 秦敬王; 12th Prince of Qin; 1581–1586	Zhu Yihuan 朱谊漶 d.1637 Prince Su of Qin 秦肃王; 13th Prince of Qin; 1587–before 1637
1st son	3rd son
Zhu Cunshu 朱存枢; 1592–1629; Hereditary Prince of Qin; 1616–1629	Zhu Cunji 朱存机; 1595–1641; Prince Jing of Qin 秦景王; 14th Prince of Qin –1641	Zhu Cunji 朱存极 d.1643 15th Prince of Qin; 1641–1643	Zhu Cunfu 朱存 d.1649 16th Prince of Qin; 1649

== Cadet princedoms ==
Genealogy of Cadet Branches of Princedom of Qin

Hongwu Emperor
2nd son
Prince of Qin 秦王; 1378, located in Xi'an Shaanxi
Zhu Shuang; 1356 - 1395; Prince Min of Qin 秦愍王; 1st Prince of Qin; 1370 - 1395
1st son	2nd son	3rd son	4th son	5th son	6th son
Prince of Yongxing Comm. 永興王; 1403, located in Gongchang, Shaanxi, then changed to Xi'an	Prince of Bao'an Comm. 保安王; 1403, located in Lintao, Shaanxi then changed to Xi'an	Prince of Xingping Comm. 興平王; 1402	Prince of Yongshou Comm. 永壽王; 1402	Prince of Anding Comm. 安定王; 1402 stripped of his title in 1419
Zhu Shangbing 朱尚炳; 1380 - 1412; Prince Yin of Qin 秦隱王; 2nd Prince of Qin; 1395 - 1412	Zhu Shanglie 朱尚烈; 1384 - 1417; Prince Yijian of Yongshou Comm. 永興懿簡王; 1st Prince of Yongshou Comm. 1403 - 1417	Zhu Shangyu 朱尚煜; 1385 - 1410; Prince Huaixi of Bao'an 保安懷僖王; 1st Prince of Bao'an Comm. 1403 - 1410	Zhu Shangzhou 朱尚烐; 1389 - 1449; Prince Gongjing of Xingping 興平恭靖王; 1st Prince of Xingping Comm. 1402 - 1449	Zhu Shanghou 朱尚灴; 1390 - 1420; Prince Huaijian of Yongshou Comm. 永壽懷簡王; 1st Prince of Yongshou Comm. 1402 - 1402	Zhu Shangkai 朱尚炌 b.1394 Prince of Anding Comm. 1402 - 1419
6 princes from 6 generations main line extinct, then succeeded by 2 princes via illegal way, title abolished in 1573	7 princes from 5 generations main line extinct, then succeeded by 2 princes via illegal way, title abolished in 1544	3 princes from 3 generations extinct in 1476	10 princes from 10 generations extinct in 1656
1st son	2nd son (1st son from primary consort)	3rd son	4th son
Prince of Weinan Comm. 渭南王; 1403 title merged after succeeded princedom of Qin in 1424	Prince of Fuping Comm. 富平王; 1422 title merged after succeeded princedom of Qin in 1428	Prince of Yichuan Comm. 宜川王; 1426
Zhu Zhijun 朱志均; 1403 - 1426; Prince Huai of Qin 秦懷王; 4th Prince of Qin; 1424 - 1426	Zhu Zhigeng 朱志堩; 1404 - 1424; Prince Xi of Qin 秦僖王; 3rd Prince of Qin; 1412 - 1424	Zhu Zhiqie 朱志𡐤; 1404 - 1455; Prince Kang of Qin 秦康王; 5th Prince of Qin; 1428 - 1455	Zhu Zhibao 朱志堢; 1410 - 1448; Prince Zhuangjing of Yichuan Comm. 宜川莊靖王; 1st Prince of Yichuan Comm. 1427－1448
4 princes from 4 generations main line extinct in 1522 recreated during Southern Ming period
1st son	2nd son	3rd son	4th son (1st son of primary consort)
Prince of Lintong Comm. 临潼王; 1426	Prince of Heyang Comm. 郃陽王; 1426	Prince Yanyang Comm. 汧陽王; 1446
Zhu Gongming 朱公銘; 1431－1474; Prince Huijian of Lintong Comm. 臨潼惠簡王; 1st Prince of Lintong Comm. 1442 - 1474 "Prince An of Qin" 秦安王 (posthumously honoured in 1538)	Zhu Gongtang 朱公鏜; 1432 - 1471 郃陽惠恭王; 1st Prince of Heyang Comm. 1442 - 1471	Zhu Gongzeng 朱公鏳; 1436 - 1495; Prince Duanyi of Yanyang 汧陽端懿王; 1st Prince of Yanyang Comm. 1446 - 1495	Zhu Gongxi 朱公錫; 1437 - 1486; Prince Hui of Qin 秦惠王; 6th Prince of Qin; 1458 - 1486
4 princes from 3 generations title abolished in 1508 due to main line extinct	3 princes from 3 generations title abolished in 1554 due to main line extinct
1st son	4th son (1st son from primary consort)	only son
Prince of Zhen'an 鎮安王; 1468 title merged after succeeded principality of Qin in 1488
Zhu Chengrun 朱誠潤; Defender General of Lintong "Prince Jing'an of Lintong Comm." 臨潼靖安王 (posthumously honoured in 1538) "Prince Gong of Qin" 秦恭王 (posthumously honoured in 1549)	Zhu Chengcan 朱誠澯; 1453 - 1493; Prince Hexi of Lintong 臨潼和僖王; 2nd Prince of Lintong Comm. 1477 - 1493 "Prince Zhuang of Qin" 秦莊王 (posthumously honoured in 1538)	Zhu Chengyong 朱誠泳; 1458 - 1498; Prince Jian of Qin 秦簡王; 7th Prince of Qin; 1488 - 1498
2nd son (1st son from primary consort)	2nd son
3rd Prince of Lintong Comm. succeeded in 1495 title merged after succeeded principality of Qin in 1500
Zhu Bingfu 朱秉柎; Bulwark General of Lintong "Prince Shun of Qin" 秦順王 (posthumously hnoured in 1549)	Zhu Bingshuang 朱秉欆; 1480 - 1501; Prince Zhao of Qin 秦昭王; 8th Prince of Qin; 1500 - 1501
Zhu Weilian 朱惟燫; Supporter General of Lintong "Prince Duan of Qin" 秦端王 (posthumously honoured in 1549)	Zhu Weichuo 朱惟焯; 1499 - 1544; Prince Ding of Qin 秦定王; 9th Prince of Qin; 1509 - 1544
Zhu Huaiquan 朱懷埢; 1524 - 1566; Prince Xuan of Qin 秦宣王; 10th Prince of Qin; 1548 - 1566
1st son
Prince of Longde Comm. 隆德王; 1550 title merged after succeeded princedom of Qin in 1569
Zhu Jingrong 朱敬鎔; 1541 - 1576; Prince Jing of Qin 秦靖王; 11th Prince of Qin; 1569 - 1576
1st son	3rd son	lesser son
Prince of Ziyang Comm. 紫阳王; 1586 title merged after succeeded principality of Qin in 1587	Prince of Chongxin Comm. 崇信王; 1595 extinct in 1650
Zhu Yihan 朱誼澏 d.1586 Prince Jing of Qin 秦敬王; 12th Prince of Qin; 1581 - 1586	Zhu Yihuan 朱誼漶 d.1637 Prince Su of Qin 秦肅王; 13 Prince of Qin; 1587 - before 1637	Zhu Yizi 朱谊𣴖 d.1650 Prince of Chongxin Comm. 1595 - 1650
3rd son	lesser son	4th son	lesser son	lesser son
second-rank prince, designation unknown during Tianqi's period title merged after made hereditary prince of Qin in 1629	second-rank prince, designation unknown during Tianqi's period title merged after succeeded princedom of Qin in 1641	Prince of Hanzhong Comm. 汉中王; 1645 title merged after succeeded princedom of Qin in 1649	second-rank prince, designation unknown during Tianqi's period	second-rank prince, designation unknown during Tianqi's period
Zhu Cunji 朱存機; 1595 - 1641; Prince Jing of Qin 秦景王; 14th Prince of Qin before 1639 - 1641	Zhu Cunji 朱存極 d.1643 15th Prince of Qin; 1641 - 1643	朱存 d.1649 16th Prince of Qin ？- 1649	Zhu Cunbi 朱存楅	Zhu Cunxi 朱存檥

The princedom of Qin has 20 cadet branches, four of these cadet princedoms' designation are unknown, and nine of these principalities had merged after the title holders succeeded the main line's princedom.

The princedom that has merged included:

- Prince of Weinan Comm. (渭南王), held by Zhu Zhijun, the 4th Prince of Qin, from 1403 to 1424
- Prince of Fuping Comm. (富平王), held by Zhu Zhiqie, the 5th Prince of Qin, from 1422 to 1428
- Prince of Lintong Comm. (see below), held by three princes until the third holder, Zhu Bingshuang, succeeded as the 8th Prince of Qin
- Prince of Zhen'an Comm. (鎮安王), held Zhu Chengyong, the 7th Prince of Qin, from 1468 to 1488
- Prince of Longde (隆德王), held by Zhu Jingrong, the 11th Prince of Qin, from 1550 to 1569
- Prince of Ziyang (紫陽王), held by Zhu Yihuan, the 13th Prince of Qin, from 1586 to 1587
- Designation unknown, held by Zhu Cunji, the 14th Prince of Qin, from some year during Tianqi Emperor's reign to 1629, before he was made the heir of the principality of Qin
- Designation unknown, held by Zhu Cunji, the 15th Prince of Qin, from some year during Tianqi Emperor's reign to 1641

While there were another two princedoms with unknown designation, both of them made from some year during Tianqi Emperor's reign persons who held them were:

- Zhu Cunbi (朱存楅), younger son of Zhu Yihuan, the 13th Prince of Qin
- Zhu Cunyi (朱存檥), younger son of Zhu Yihuan, the 13th Prince of Qin

=== Princedom of Yongxing Comm. ===
Prince of Yongxing Commandery (永興郡王) was created in 1403 for Zhu Shanglie, the second son of Zhu Shuang, 1st Prince of Qin. The title was abolished in 1573 by the Ming court and headed by the senior-most members. The princedom was located at Gongchang (鞏昌), Shaanxi.

- Zhu Shuang, Prince Min of Qin, the 1st Prince of Qin
  - Zhu Shanglie (朱尚烈; 29 Sep 1384 – 22 Feb 1418) (1st), second son of Zhu Shuang, Prince Min of Qin, the 1st Prince of Qin. He was made Prince of Yongxing Comm. in 1403 and died in 1418. His full posthumous was Prince Yijian of Yongxing (永興懿簡王).
    - Zhu Zhibao (朱志㙸; 1407 - 1454) (2nd), Zhu Shanglie's eldest son, he succeeded the princedom from 1423 and died in 1454. His full posthumous name was Prince Gongxian of Yongxing (永興恭憲王)
      - Zhu Gongshi (朱公鉐; 1428 - 1488) (3rd), Zhu Zhibao's eldest son, he succeeded the princedom from 1455 and died in 1488. His full posthumous name was Prince Zhaoxi of Yongxing (永興昭僖王)
        - Zhu Chenglan (朱誠瀾; 1455 - 1507) (4th), he succeeded the princedom from 1492 and died in 1507. As both of his two sons died before him, he was succeeded by Zhu Bingju, his first cousin once removed. His full posthumous name was Prince Ronghui of Yongxing (永興榮惠王)
          - Zhu Bingrou (朱秉柔), was made a bulwark general, he died before his father.
      - Zhu Gongran (朱公䤡), Zhu Zhibao's second son, was made a defender general.
        - Zhu Chengyi (朱誠瀷, was made a bulwark general.
          - Zhu Bingju (朱秉櫸; d.1533) (5th), he initially was made a supporter general. He succeeded the princedom from 1512 from his father's cousin, Zhu Chenglan but his succession was considered counterfeit after his death. His full posthumous name was Prince Zhuangding of Yongxing (永興莊定王)
            - Zhu Weisui (朱惟熣; d.1573) (6th), Zhu Bingju's eldest son, he succeeded the princedom from 1540 but his succession through his father was considered counterfeit. Having self-confessed his succession illegal, he was permitted to hold his princely title until his death. After the princedom was abolished, his son Zhu Huaitian was appointed to head the clan. His full posthumous name was Prince Gongding of Yongxing (永興恭定王)
              - Zhu Huaitian (朱懷填), was made a bulwark lieutenant. He headed the clan in 1575 after his father's death.
                - Succession of headship unknown

=== Princedom of Bao'an Comm. ===
Prince of Bao'an Commandery (保安郡王) was created in 1403, for Zhu Shangyu, third son of Zhu Shuang, the 1st Prince of Qin. The title was abolished in 1554 by the Ming court. The princedom was initially located in Lintao (臨洮), Shaanxi, then changed to Xi'an.

- Zhu Shuang, Prince Min of Qin, the 1st Prince of Qin
  - Zhu Shangyu (朱尚煜; 20 Nov 1385 - 25 Feb 1410) (1st), third son of Zhu Shuang, Prince Min of Qin, the 1st Prince of Qin. He was made Prince of Bao'an on 10 March 1403. His full posthumous name was Prince Huaixi of Bao'an (保安懷僖王)
    - Zhu Zhidong (朱志垌; 1410 - 11 May 1436; 2nd), he succeeded the princedom from 1422 until his death in 1436. His full posthumous name was Prince Daoshun of Bao'an (保安悼順王)
      - Zhu Gonglian (朱公鍊; 19 Apr 1435 – 10 Mar 1475) (3rd), Zhu Zhidong's second son. He succeeded the princedom from 1447 until his death in 1475. His full posthumous name was Prince Zhuangjian of Bao'an (保安莊簡王)
        - Zhu Chenghuang (朱誠潢; 1462 - 21 Jul 1496) (4th), Zhu Gonglian's third son. He succeeded the princedom from 1478 until his death in 1496. His was succeeded by his seventh brother, Zhu Chengdu, as his only son died before him. His full posthumous name was Prince Rongmu of Bao'an (保安榮穆王)
          - Zhu Bingyi (朱秉㰘), died before his father.
        - Zhu Chenglu (朱誠淥; 1466 - 10 Jul 1502) (5th), Zhu Gonglian's seventh son. He initially was made a defender general. He then succeeded the princedom after his childless brother from 20 December 1498, until his death in 1501. He was succeeded by his ninth brother, Zhu Chengjiao, as his only son died before him. His full posthumous name was Prince Zhaohe of Bao'an (保安昭和王)
          - Zhu Bingxi (朱秉桸), died before his father when his father was still a defender general
        - Zhu Chengjiao (朱誠漖; 1467 - 6 Jun 1519) (6th), Zhu Gonglian's ninth son. He initially was made a defender general. He succeeded the princedom from 1507 until his death in 1519. His full posthumous name was Prince Jinghe of Bao'an (保安靖和王)
          - Zhu Bingzhan (朱秉棧; 1493 - 11 Jul 1554) (7th), Zhu Chengjiao's second son. He initially was made a defender general. He succeeded the princedom from 11 Jul 1527 until his death 1544, after requested the court in 1526. As his succession was originally not approved from the first request, his son could not succeed in the princedom and the title was abolished. His full posthumous name was Prince Gongyi of Bao'an (保安恭懿王)
            - Zhu Weijian (朱惟煡), Zhu Bingzhan's eldest son. He was made a supporter general and was appointed the head of the clan after the title abolishment.

=== Princedom of Xingping Comm. ===
Prince of Xingping Commandery (興平郡王) was created in 1402, for Zhu Shangzhou, fourth son of Zhu Shuang, the 1st Prince of Qin. The princedom extinct in 1476 after the last prince died childlessly.

- Zhu Shuang, Prince Min of Qin, the 1st Prince of Qin
  - Zhu Shangzhou (朱尚烐); 19 Oct 1389 - 15 May 1449) (1st), fourth son of Zhu Shuang, Prince Min of Qin, the 1st Prince of Qin. He was made Prince of Xingping on 30 September 1402. His full posthumous name was Prince Gongjing of Xingping (興平恭靖王). His consort was a granddaughter of Tang He.
    - Zhu Zhinie (朱志㙞; 1427 - 8 Sep 1457) (2nd), Zhu Shangzhou's second son. He succeeded the princedom from 1451 until his death in 1457. His full posthumous name was Prince Zhuanghui of Xingping (興平莊惠王)
      - Zhu Gongshuo (朱公鑠; 1442 - 1476) (3rd), Zhu Zhinie's second son. He succeeded the princedom on 14 June 1458, until his death in 1476. As he had not any children, the princedom was extinct after his death. His full posthumous name was Prince Anxi of Xingping (興平安僖王)

=== Princedom of Yongshou Comm. ===
Prince of Yongshou Commandery (永壽郡王) was created in 1402, for Zhu Shanghong, fifth son of Zhu Shuang, the 1st Prince of Qin. The princedom was extinct in 1656, during the reign of Yongli Emperor of Southern Ming.

- Zhu Shuang, Prince Min of Qin, the 1st Prince of Qin
  - Zhu Shanghong (朱尚灴; 17 Apr 1390 - 19 Sep 1420) (1st), fifth son of Zhu Shuang, Prince Min of Qin, the 1st Prince of Qin. He was made Prince of Yongshou in 1402 until his death in 1420. His full posthumous name was Prince Huaijian of Yongshou (永壽懷簡王)
    - Zhu Zhizhi (朱志埴; 1404 - 29 Jun 1470) (2nd), Zhu Shanghong's eldest son. He succeeded the princedom from 1431 to 1470. His full posthumous name was Prince Anhui of Yongshou (永壽安惠王)
      - Zhu Gongchan (朱公鋋; 3 Dec 1438 - 26 Feb 1473) (3rd), Zhu Zhizhi's eldest son. He succeeded the princedom from 1472 to 1473. His full posthumous name was Prince Kangding of Yongshou (永壽康定王)
        - Zhu Chenglin (朱誠淋; 1462 - 23 Dec 1495) (4th). He initially was made a defender general, as his mother was not the primary consort of his father. He succeeded the princedom from 1476 to 1495. His full posthumous name was Prince Zhuangxi of Yongshou (永壽莊僖王)
          - Zhu Bingdang (朱秉欓; 1477 - 1538) (5th), eldest son of Zhu Chenglin. He initially was made a defender general, as his mother was not the primary consort of his father. He succeeded the princedom from 1497 to 1538. His full posthumous name was Prince Gonghe of Yongshou (永壽恭和王)
            - Zhu Weiyao (朱惟燿; d.1528), eldest son of Zhu Bingdang. He was made a defender general and died before his father. He was posthumous as a Prince of Yongshou under the posthumous title "Prince Huaishun of Yongshou" (永壽懷順王) after his only son succeeded the princedom
              - Zhu Huaishan (朱懷墡; d.1550) (6th), he succeeded the princedom from 1549 to 1550 after his grandfather's death. His succession was in conflict with his uncle, Zhu Weiyi, as Zhu Weiyi's mother was later made the primary consort. His full posthumous name was Prince Rongjing of Yongshou (永壽榮靖王)
                - Zhu Jingyong (朱敬鏞; died before 1605) (7th), he succeeded the princedom from 1552 until before 1605. His full posthumous name was Prince Zhaoxian of Yongshou (永壽昭憲王)
                  - Zhu Yikuang (朱誼況; d.1614) (8th), he was designated chief son (heir apparent) in 1537. He then succeeded the princedom from 1605 to 1614. His full posthumous name was Prince Kangyu of Yongshou (永壽康裕王)
                    - Zhu Cunsang (朱存𣑚; d.1644) (9th), Zhu Yikuang's eldest son. He was designated chief grandson in 1599, then promoted to chief son in 1604. He succeeded the princedom from 1617 to 1644, he was succeeded by his brother after he was captured by Li Zicheng.
                    - Zhu Cunwu (朱存梧; d.1656) (10th), Zhu Yikuang's second son. He succeeded the princedom under Yongli Emperor's empower, from 1649 to 1656. The princedom was abolished by the Southern Ming court after his childless death.
            - Zhu Weiyi (朱惟燱), Zhu Bingdang's sixth son. He was made a defender general. He was conflicted with his nephew for the princedom succession.

=== Princedom of Anding Comm. ===
Prince of Anding Commandery (安定郡王) was created in 1402, for Zhu Shangkai, sixth son of Zhu Shuang, the 1st Prince of Qin. The princedom was abolished in 1419 by Yongle Emperor.

- Zhu Shuang, Prince Min of Qin, the 1st Prince of Qin
  - Zhu Shangkai (朱尚炌; b.4 Dec 1394), sixth son of Zhu Shuang, Prince Min of Qin, the 1st Prince of Qin. He was made Prince of Anding in 1402. He was then stripped of his title, deposed as a commoner in 1419 under the crime of treason, and dispatched to Sizhou to guarding the tombs of imperial forefathers. He died before 1452.

=== Princedom of Yichuan Comm. ===
Prince of Yichuan Commandery (宜川郡王) was created in 1426, for Zhu Zhibao, fourth son of Zhu Shangbing, the 2nd Prince of Qin. The prinedom was originally abolished in 1522, then the clan was headed by lower-rank members from 1525. The title recreated again by the Southern Ming court until the extinction in 1652.

- Zhu Shangbing, Prince Yin of Qin, the 2nd Prince of Qin
  - Zhu Zhibao (朱志堢; 1410 - 18 Sep 1448) (1st), fourth son of Zhu Shangbing, the 2nd Prince of Qin. He was made Prince of Yichuan in 1426 until his death in 1448. His full posthumous name was Prince Zhuangjing of Yichuan (宜川莊靖王)
    - Zhu Gongyuan (朱公鋺; d.1484) (2nd), Zhu Zhibao's eldest son. he succeeded the princedom from 1451 to 1484. His full posthumous name was Prince Rongshun of Yichuan (宜川榮順王)
      - Zhu Chengguan (朱誠灌; .1496) (3rd), he initially was made a defender general, as his mother was not his father's primary consort. He succeeded the principality from 1490 to 1496. His full posthumous name was Prince Kangxi of Yichuan (宜川康僖王)
        - Zhu Bingyu (朱秉𣕃; d.1522) (4th), he succeeded the princedom from 1500 to 1522. The princedom was abolished after his death without any children, and his cousin, Zhu Bingniao was appointed to head the clan. His full posthumous name was Prince Siyu of Yichuan (宜川思裕王)
    - Unknown line
      - Zhu Bingniao (朱秉樢; d.1525), was made a supporter general. He was appointed to head the clan after the abolishment of the title.
        - Zhu Weihu (朱惟熩), was made a defender lieutenant. He succeeded the headship of the clan after his father's death.
    - Unknown line (six generations)
      - Zhu Jingdiao (朱敬鑃; d.1652) (5th), a 6th generation descendants of Zhu Zhibao. He succeeded the princedom until his death in 1652.

=== Princedom of Lintong Comm. ===
Prince of Lintong Commandery (臨潼郡王) was created in 1426 for Zhu Gongming, the eldest son (secondary son) of Zhu Zhiqie, the 5th Prince of Qin. The princedom merged after the 3rd Prince of Lintong succeeded the princedom of Qin in 1500.

- Zhu Zhiqie, Prince Kang of Qin, the 5th Prince of Qin
  - Zhu Gongming (朱公銘; 14 Oct 1431 – 26 Sep 1474) (1st), eldest son of Zhu Zhiqie, Prince Kang of Qin, the 5th Prince of Qin. He was made Prince of Lintong in 1442. He was later posthumously honoured under the posthumous title "Prince An of Qin" (秦安王) after his grandson succeeded the princedom of Qin. His original full posthumous name was Prince Huijian of Lintong (臨潼惠簡王)
    - Zhu Chengrun (朱誠潤), Zhu Gongming's eldest son. He initially was made a defender general and appointed as the head of the clan in 1501 after his nephew succeeded the princedom of Qin. He was later posthumously honoured under the posthumous title "Comm. Prince Jing'an Lintong" (臨潼靖安王), and then "Prince Gong of Qin" (秦恭王) after his great-grandson succeeded the princedom of Qin.
    - Zhu Chengcan (朱誠澯; 1453 - 17 Jan 1492) (2nd), Zhu Gongming's fourth son and eldest son by his primary consort. He succeeded the princedom from 1477 to 1492. He was later posthumously honoured under the posthumous title "Prince Zhuang of Qin" (秦莊王) after his son succeeded the princedom of Qin. His original full posthumous name was Prince Hexi of Lintong (臨潼和僖王)
    - Zhu Bingshuang (朱秉欆; 1481 - 1501) (3rd), Zhu Chengcan's second son. He initially was made a defender general, he succeeded the princedom from 1495 to 1500, he was later succeeded the princedom of Qin. (See Prince of Qin of Ming dynasty#Princedom of Qin)

=== Princedom of Heyang Comm. ===
Prince of Heyang Commandery (郃陽郡王) was created in 1426 for Zhu Gongtang, the fourth son of Zhu Zhiqie, the 5th Prince of Qin. The princedom was abolished in 1508 by the Ming court and headed by the senior-most members.

- Zhu Zhiqie, Prince Kang of Qin, the 5th Prince of Qin
  - Zhu Gongtang (朱公鏜; 9 Sep 1404 – 23 Dec 1471) (1st), fourth son of Zhu Zhiqie, Prince Kang of Qin, the 5th Prince of Qin. He was made Prince of Heyang in 1426 until his death in 1471. His full posthumous name was Prince Huigong of Heyang (郃陽惠恭王)
  - Zhu Chenghong (朱誠泓; 1452–1494) (2nd), Zhu Gongtang's eldest son. He initially was made a defender general. He succeeded the princedom from 1473 to 1494. His full posthumous name was Prince Wengmu of Heyang (郃陽溫穆王)
    - Zhu Bingrou (朱秉楺), died young.
  - Zhu Chengfen (朱誠汾), Zhu Gongtang's second son, was made a defender general. He was originally the heir presumptive to the princedom after the death of his eldest brother. He asked for the succession but died before the official announcement from the court.
    - Zhu Bingju (朱秉橘; 3 Sep 1487 – 2 Jul 1517), was made a bulwark general. He asked for the succession of princedom after his father's death but was not approved. He was instead made the head of the clan in 1509.
      - Zhu Weiyi (朱惟熠; 9 Apr 1510 – 14 Feb 1585), Zhu Bingju's eldest son, was made a supporter general. He succeeded the headship of the clan from 1509.
        - Zhu Huaiqiao (朱懷墝), was made a defender lieutenant. He succeeded the headship of the clan after his father.
          - Zhu Jingfu (朱敬鉘; 1549–1621), was made a bulwark lieutenant. He succeeded the headship of the clan after his father.
            - Zhu Yiti (朱誼𣹲), was made a supporter lieutenant. He succeeded the headship of the clan after his father in 1621.
              - Succession of headship unknown
      - Zhu Weida (朱惟炟), Zhu Bingju's second son, was made a supporter general.
  - Zhu Chenghui (朱誠澮; 21 Apr 1456 – 21 Sep 1494) (3rd), Zhu Gongtang's third son. He initially was made a defender general, then succeeded the princedom from 1499 unofficially. His full posthumous name was Prince Dao'an of Heyang (郃陽悼安王)
    - Zhu Bingxi (朱秉檄; 12 Sep 1484 – 16 Jan 1508) (4th), he succeeded the princedom from 1508. His full posthumous name was Prince Anxi of Heyang (郃陽安僖王). As his succession was a special bestow, the princedom was abolished after his death.

=== Princedom of Yanyang Comm. ===
Prince of Yanyang Commandery (汧陽郡王) was created in 1446 for Zhu Gongcheng, the fifth son of Zhu Zhiqie, the 5th Prince of Qin. The princedom became extinct in 1554.

- Zhu Zhiqie, Prince Kang of Qin, the 5th Prince of Qin
  - Zhu Gongcheng (朱公鏳; d.1495) (1st), fifth son of Zhu Zhiqie, Prince Kang of Qin, the 5th Prince of Qin. He was made Prince of Yanyang in 1446 and until his death in 1495. His full posthumous name was Prince Duanyi of Yanyang (汧陽端懿王).
    - Zhu Chenglie (朱誠洌; d.1502) (2nd), Zhu Gongcheng's second son, he succeeded the princedom from 1508 to 1554. His full posthumous name was Prince Anyu of Yanyang (汧陽安裕王)
      - Zhu Bingzhen (朱秉榛; d.1554) (3rd), he succeeded the princedom from 1508 to 1554. His full posthumous name was Prince Zhuangjing of Yanyang (汧陽莊靖王). As his succession was a special bestow, the princedom was abolished after his death.
