= Yizhi capsule =

Type of traditional Chinese medicine

Yizhi capsule (YZC) is a type of traditional Chinese medicine (TCM) developed for treating vascular dementia.

== Studies ==
A study in rats concluded that Yizhi capsule (YZC) has an action of improving learning and memory disorder, and good protective effect on Aβ25–35 induced neurotoxicity in SD rats. Another study assessed the efficacy of Yizhi capsule in treating senile dementia. The results showed that Yizhi capsule could remarkably increase mini-mental state examination (MMSE) and Hamilton Depression Scale (HDS) marks of patients with vascular dementia. Moreover, Yizhi capsule improved cerebral blood flow, brain electrical activity monitoring (BEAM) and hemorheological indexes especially for the abnormal case. Another study mentions that the raised score in the revised Hasegawa dementia scales (HDS) demonstrated that the effect of Yizhi capsules in treating loss of intellectual function after cerebrovascular diseases was significantly better than that of the drug Piracetam. The study concluded that the data indicate that Yizhi capsule is a relatively good preparation for prevention of vascular dementia.

A Cochrane review in 2007, however, concluded that none of the studies conducted up to that time used methods that could provide strong evidence that the capsules are an effective treatment.
