= Zhi =

Zhi (Wade-Giles: chih) may refer to:

- Zhì (智), "wisdom", a virtue in the philosophy of Mencius (book)
- Zheng Zhi (郑智), a footballer
- Zhi (surname) (支)
- Zhi (excrescences) (芝), a term related to mushrooms and Daoism
- Ground (Dzogchen), transliterated gzhi or zhi, in Tibetan Buddhism
