= Li Zhiyi =

Song dynasty poet

Li Zhiyi (Chinese: 李之儀; born Wudi County, Shandong; c. 1048–1127) courtesy name Duanshu (端淑) was a Song dynasty Chinese poet.

He married Hu Shuxiu (胡淑修; 1047–1105) and passed the imperial examinations in 1070 with a jinshi degree. He became a disciple and part of the Yuanyou circle that included Su Shi.

== Busuanzi ==
Li's best known work, the Busuanzi (卜算子; 'Song of Divination') expresses longing in a direct and flowing way. It was included in the poetry collection 300 Song Ci (宋詞三百首).

中文

我住長江頭
君住長江尾
日日思君不見君
共飲長江水

此水幾時休
此恨何時已
只願君心似我心
定不負相思意

English Translation

I live where the Long River starts,
And you live where the Long River ends.
Day after day I dream of you, though you’re not in view—
We both drink from the same stream.

When will this river finally come to rest?
When will this sorrow finally set me free?
If only your heart were like my heart,
I would not betray this longing we share.

=== Popular Culture ===
Its first verse is referenced in the science fiction The Three-Body Problem.
