= Cristy Lane discography =

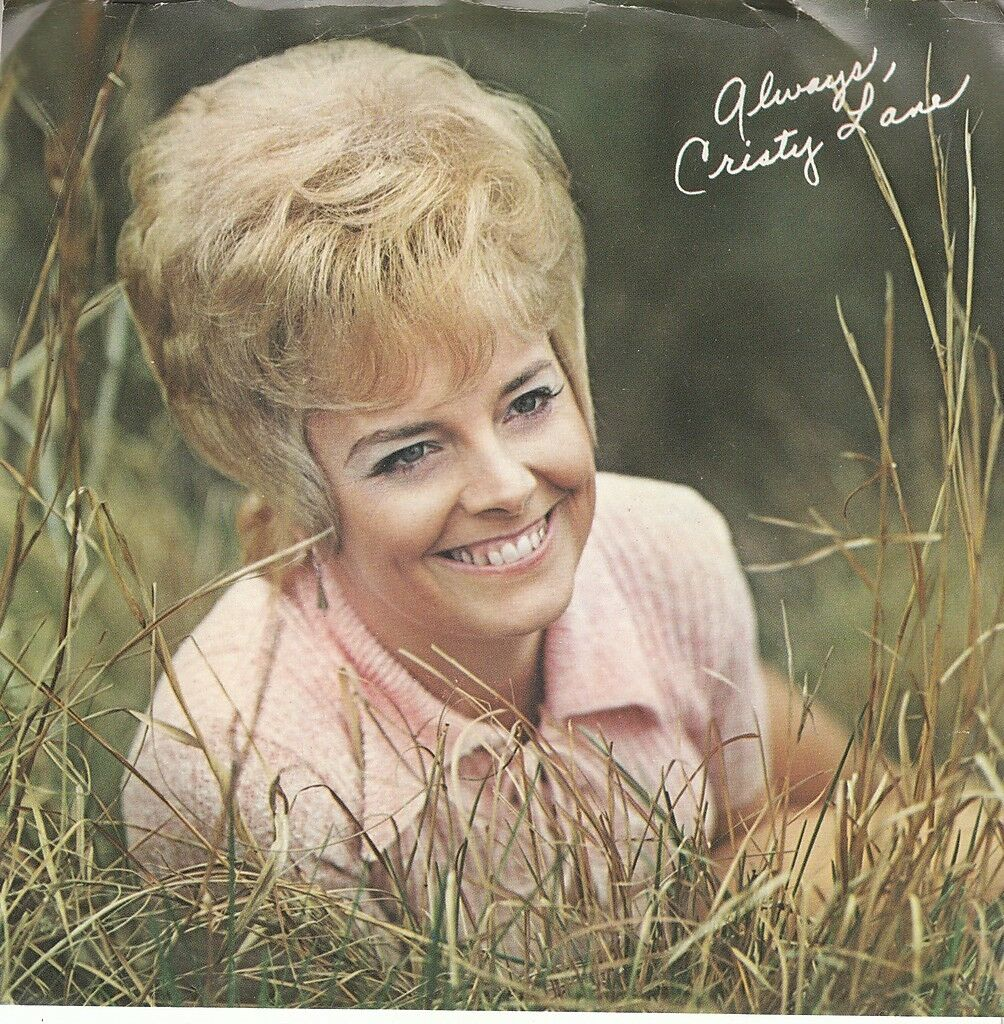
- Cristy Lane, 1975.
- Studio albums: 18
- Compilation albums: 23
- Singles: 33
- Video albums: 1
- Music videos: 1
- Other album appearances: 1

American country and Christian music artist Cristy Lane has released 18 studio albums, 23 compilation albums, one video album, one music video, 33 singles and appeared on one album. Lane first recorded for various labels in the 1960s. In the 1970s, Lane's husband formed his own label titled LS Records and she recorded exclusively for the company. In 1977, Lane had her first charting singles on the Billboard country songs chart. This was followed by 1977's "Let Me Down Easy," which reached the top ten and became her first major country hit. She had further top ten country hits that year with "I'm Gonna Love You Anyway" and "Penny Arcade". Her first LS album was released in 1978 titled Cristy Lane Is the Name and featured her major hits from the year. In 1978, she had a top five hit with the single "I Just Can't Stay Married to You" and it appeared on her next studio album titled Love Lies. The album was her first to reach the Billboard country albums chart. In 1979, Lane switched to United Artists Records and had three more hits, including the top ten country single "Simple Little Words".

In 1980, Lane's cover of the Christian piece titled "One Day at a Time" reached number one on the country chart. The song became the most commercially-successful single of her music career and became a hit in multiple countries. It was followed by Lane's final top ten country hit called "Sweet Sexy Eyes". Both singles appeared on her 1980 studio album called Ask Me to Dance, which reached number 14 on the country albums chart. In 1981, Lane's cover of ABBA's "I Have a Dream" reached the top 20 and appeared on an album of the same name. She continued recording for her label through the 1980s. With United Artists (re-named Liberty Records), Lane released Here's to Us (1982) and Footprints in the Sand (1983). Both studio albums were her final to chart on the Billboard country LP's chart. Lane and her husband also began marketing music on television. The marketing strategy allowed Lane to continue releasing compilation albums through the 1990s and 2000s. Among her more recent compilations, 22 All Time Favorites, reached the Billboard country albums chart, peaking at number 62.

== Albums ==
=== Studio albums ===
List of albums, with selected chart positions, and other relevant details
Title	Album details	Peak chart positions		
Title	Album details	US Cou.	US Chr.	NZ
Cristy Lane Salutes G.I.'s of Viet Nam	Released: 1969; Label: Lane; Formats: LP	—	—	—
Cristy Lane Is the Name	Released: February 1978; Label: LS; Formats: LP	—	—	—
Love Lies	Released: December 1978; Label: LS; Formats: LP	44	—	—
Simple Little Words	Released: September 1979; Label: LS/United Artists; Formats: LP, cassette	38	—	—
Ask Me to Dance	Released: March 1980; Label: LS/United Artists; Formats: LP, cassette	14	—	—
I Have a Dream	Released: February 1981; Label: Liberty/LS; Formats: LP, cassette	35	—	33
Fragile – Handle with Care	Released: September 1981; Label: Liberty/LS; Formats: LP, cassette	43	—	—
One Day at a Time	Released: December 1981; Label: LS; Formats: LP, cassette	—	17	6
Here's to Us	Released: December 1982; Label: Liberty/LS; Formats: LP	42	—	—
Footprints in the Sand	Released: August 1983; Label: Liberty/LS; Formats: LP, cassette	64	—	—
Christmas Is the Man from Galilee	Released: November 1983; Label: Liberty/LS; Formats: LP, cassette	—	—	—
Harbor Lights	Released: 1985; Label: LS; Formats: LP, cassette	—	—	—
Cristy Lane Salutes the GI's of Vietnam	Released: 1986; Label: LS; Formats: LP, cassette	—	—	—
Under His Wings	Released: 1986; Label: Arrival; Formats: LP	—	—	—
White Christmas	Released: November 1987; Label: LS; Formats: LP, cassette	—	—	—
All in His Hands	Released: 1988; Label: LS; Formats: LP, cassette	—	—	—
Top 10 Songs of All Time plus "Star Spangled Banner"	Released: 1991; Label: LS; Formats: Cassette, CD	—	—	—
Songs of Passion	Released: April 26, 2005; Label: LS; Formats: CD, music download	—	—	—
"—" denotes a recording that did not chart or was not released in that territory.

=== Compilation albums ===
List of albums, with selected chart positions, and other relevant details
Title	Album details	Peak chart positions
Title	Album details	US Country
Amazing Grace	Released: March 1982; Label: Liberty; Formats: LP, cassette	37
Christmas with Cristy	Released: December 1983; Label: Liberty; Formats: LP, cassette	—
At Her Best	Released: 1984; Label: Liberty; Formats: LP, cassette	—
I Believe	Released: 1985; Label: EMI/LS; Formats: Cassette	—
How Great Thou Art	Released: March 1, 1994; Label: EMI/Riversong; Formats: Cassette	—
Greatest Hits and Favorites	Released: 1986; Label: LS; Formats: LP, cassette	—
Greatest Hits Vol. I & II	Released: 1987; Label: LS; Formats: Cassette, CD	—
Country Classics, Vol. II & III	Released: 1989; Label: LS; Formats: Cassette, CD	—
Cristy Lane's Greatest Hits, Vol. 1	Released: 1991; Label: LS; Formats: CD	—
20 Greatest Hits	Released: 1991; Label: TeeVee; Formats: Cassette, CD	—
Cristy Lane at Her Best	Released: 1994; Label: EMI; Formats: Cassette, CD	—
23 Millennium Classics	Released: 1999; Label: LS; Formats: CD	—
One Day at a Time: 22 All-Time Favorites Vol. I and II.	Released: June 24, 2003; Label: Chordant/LS; Formats: Cassette, CD	62
Footprints in the Sand Volumes I & II	Released: June 24, 2003; Label: LS; Formats: CD	—
Children's Songs and Lullabies	Released: October 21, 2003; Label: LS; Formats: CD	—
30 Christmas Classics	Released: October 21, 2003; label: LS; Formats: CD	—
Greatest Country Hits	Released: January 26, 2005; Label: Collector's Choice/EMI; Formats: CD	—
27 Christmas Classics	Released: September 26, 2006; Label: LS; Formats: CD, music download	—
I Believe in Angels	Released: August 14, 2007; Label: LS; Formats: CD	—
Songs of Faith	Released: 2009; Label: LS; Formats: CD	—
Amazing Grace	Released: December 7, 2010; Label: LS; Formats: CD, music download	—
I'm with You Tonight	Released: 2011; Label: EMI/LS; Formats: CD, music download	—
17 Christmas Classics	Released: December 17, 2011; Label: LS; Formats: CD, music download	— (Note: 17 Christmas Classics did not reach the Billboard country chart, but instead reached number 46 on the Top Christian Albums chart and number 17 on the Heatseekers Albums chart.)
"—" denotes a recording that did not chart or was not released in that territory.

== Singles ==
List of singles, with selected chart positions, showing other relevant details
Title	Year	Peak chart positions				Album
Title	Year	US Cou.	AUS	NZ	CAN Cou.	Album
"Janie Took My Place"	1966	—	—	—	—	—N/a
"Heart in the Sand"	1967	—	—	—	—	—N/a
"Let's Pretend"	1967	—	—	—	—	—N/a
"Promise Me Anything"	1969	—	—	—	—	Cristy Lane Salutes G.I.'s of Viet Nam
"I Am the Woman"	1970	—	—	—	—	Cristy Lane Salutes G.I.'s of Viet Nam
"Take a Look Around You"	1971	—	—	—	—	—N/a
"Jesus Is a Soul Man"	1971	—	—	—	—	—N/a
"I've Got the Man"	1972	—	—	—	—	—N/a
"This Is The First Time I've Seen The Last Time On Your Face"	1976	—	—	—	—	—N/a
"Midnight Blue"	1976	—	—	—	—	Cristy Lane Is the Name
"By the Way"	1976	—	—	—	—	Cristy Lane Is the Name
"Tryin' to Forget About You"	1977	52	—	—	—	Cristy Lane Is the Name
"Sweet Deceiver"	1977	53	—	—	—	Love Lies
"Let Me Down Easy"	1977	7	—	—	28	Cristy Lane Is the Name
"Shake Me I Rattle"	1977	16	—	—	28	Cristy Lane Is the Name
"I'm Gonna Love You Anyway"	1978	10	—	—	—	Cristy Lane Is the Name
"Penny Arcade"	1978	7	—	—	4	Cristy Lane Is the Name
"I Just Can't Stay Married to You"	1978	5	—	—	4	Love Lies
"Simple Little Words"	1979	10	—	—	26	Simple Little Words
"Slippin' Up, Slippin' Around"	1979	17	—	—	22	Simple Little Words
"Come to My Love"	1979	16	—	—	35	Simple Little Words
"One Day at a Time"	1980	1	91	5	10	Ask Me to Dance
"Sweet Sexy Eyes"	1980	8	—	—	16	Ask Me to Dance
"I Have a Dream"	1980	17	—	34	—	I Have a Dream
"Love to Love You"	1981	21	—	—	44	I Have a Dream
"Cheatin' Is Still on My Mind"	1981	38	—	—	46	Fragile – Handle with Care
"Lies on Your Lips"	1981	22	—	—	—	Fragile – Handle with Care
"Fragile – Handle with Care"	1982	52	—	—	—	Fragile – Handle with Care
"The Good Old Days"	1982	81	—	—	—	Here's to Us
"I've Come Back (To Say I Love You One More Time)"	1983	63	—	—	—	Footprints in the Sand
"Footprints in the Sand"	1983	80	—	—	—	Footprints in the Sand
"Midnight Blue" (re-release)	1984	—	—	—	—	—N/a
"I Wanna Wake Up with You"	1987	88	—	—	—	—N/a
"He's Got the Whole World in His Hands"	1987	88	—	—	—	—N/a
"—" denotes a recording that did not chart or was not released in that territory.

== Videography ==
=== Music videos ===
List of music videos, showing year released and director
Title	Year	Director(s)	Ref.
"Midnight Blue"	1984	not available	

=== Video albums ===
List of albums, showing certifications and other relevant details
Title	Album details
Cristy Lane Live	Released: September 22, 2009; Label: Cristy Lane; Formats: DVD

== Other album appearances ==
List of non-single guest appearances, with other performing artists, showing year released and album name
Title	Year	Other artist(s)	Album	Ref.
"Y'all Come"	1995	Moe Bandy; Roy Clark; Mickey Gilley; Jim Stafford; Buck Trent; Boxcar Willie	Gordy (music from the original motion picture soundtrack)	
