= Christmas Is the Man from Galilee =

Studio album by Cristy Lane
- Released: November 1983
- Genre: Country; Christmas
- Label: Liberty; LS
- Producer: Lee Stoller

Cristy Lane chronology
Footprints in the Sand (1983)	Christmas Is the Man from Galilee (1983)	Harbor Lights (1985)

Christmas Is the Man from Galilee is a studio album by American Christian and country singer Cristy Lane. It was released in November 1983 via Liberty and LS Records and contained 21 tracks. It was Lane's first album release to comprise entirely of Christmas music. Due to her recent success with Christian audiences, the album contained mostly holiday inspirational favorites.

== Background, content and release ==
During the late 1970s and early 1980s, Cristy Lane had country music commercial success with songs like "Let Me Down Easy" and "I Just Can't Stay Married to You". Her music was then marketed towards Christian audiences following the success of her country-crossover hit "One Day at a Time". Christmas Is the Man from Galilee was part of a series of albums that followed the song that was marketed towards this fan base. Future holiday compilations will derive from this original product.

The album was produced by Lane's husband and manager, Lee Stoller. It contained a total of 21 tracks, which was mostly Christmas inspirational material. Examples included "God Rest Ye Merry Gentlemen", "What Child Is This?" and "Joy to the World". A handful of previously recorded tracks were also featured including her 1977 hit "Shake Me I Rattle". Christmas Is the Man from Galilee was released in November 1983 on Liberty Records and LS Records. It was the eleventh studio album issued in Lane's music career. It was originally offered as a vinyl LP and a cassette. Both versions were sold on cable television networks as a way to market Lane's music to a broader audience.

== Track listing ==
Side one (vinyl and cassette versions)
No.	Title	Writer(s)	Length
1.	"The Man from Galilee"	Chris Holloway
2.	"Away in a Manger"	William J. Kirkpatrick; James R. Murray
3.	"Pretty Paper"	Willie Nelson
4.	"White Christmas"	Irving Berlin
5.	"Silent Night"	Franz Xaver Gruber; Joseph Mohr
6.	"O Holy Night"	Placide Cappeau; John Sullivan Dwight
7.	"The First Noel"	Traditional
8.	"What Child Is This"	William Chatterton Dix
9.	"Up on the House Top"	Benjamin Hanby
10.	"O Come All Ye Faithful"	John Reading; John Francis Wade; various

Side two (vinyl and cassette versions)
No.	Title	Writer(s)	Length
1.	"Shake Me I Rattle (Squeeze Me I Cry)"	Hal Hackady; Charles Naylor
2.	"Jingle Bells"	James Lord Pierpont
3.	"Blue Christmas"	Billy Hays; Jay W. Johnson
4.	"A Little Bit Colder"	Fred Newell
5.	"God Rest Ye Merry Gentlemen"	Traditional
6.	"Hark the Herald Angels Sing"	William Hayman Cummings; Felix Mendelssohn; Charles Wesley
7.	"It Came upon a Midnight Clear"	Edmund Sears; Richard Storrs Willis; Arthur Sullivan
8.	"Memory of an Old Christmas Card"	Vaughn Horton
9.	"Jolly Old Saint Nicolas"	Horton
10.	"Joy to the World"	George Frideric Handel; Lowell Mason; Isaac Watts
11.	"O Little Town of Bethlehem"	Phillips Brooks; Lewis Redner; Ralph Vaughan Williams

== Personnel ==
All credits are adapted from the liner notes of Christmas Is the Man from Galilee.

Musical personnel

- David Briggs – Piano
- Clay Caire – Drums
- Ken Christensen – Piano
- Sonny Garrish – Guitar
- Jon Goin – Guitar
- Sheri Hoffman – Background vocals
- Mike Holland – Guitar
- Cristy Lane – Lead vocals
- Anne Marie – Background vocals
- Farrell Morris – Percussion
- Nashville String Machine – Strings
- Fred Newell – Guitar
- Steve Schaeffer – Bass
- Gene Siak – Piano
- Lisa Silver – Background vocals
- Diane Tidwell – Background vocals
- Kim Weldon – Bass

Technical personnel

- Ken Christensen – String arrangement
- Tom Harding – Engineer
- Disc Mastering – Mastering
- Dave Shipley – Engineer
- Lee Stoller – Producer
- Treasure Isle – Studio

== Release history ==
Region	Date	Format	Label	Ref.
United States	November 1983	Cassette; vinyl	Liberty Records; LS Records	
