= I'm Gonna Love You Anyway =

"Gonna Love You Anyway"

Song by Tanya Tucker

from the album Here's Some Love
- Released: September 6, 1976
- Genre: Country; country rock
- Length: 2:03
- Label: MCA
- Songwriter: Layng Martine Jr.
- Producer: Jerry Crutchfield

"I'm Gonna Love You Anyway" is a song written by Layng Martine Jr. It was first recorded in 1976 by American country music performer Tanya Tucker. In 1978, it was released as a single by American Christian and country music singer Cristy Lane. Her version was the first to become commercially-successful, becoming her second top ten hit single on the Billboard country chart. The song was released on her 1978 studio release titled Cristy Lane Is the Name.

== Tanya Tucker version ==
The song was composed by songwriter and musician Layng Martine Jr. Under the title "Gonna Love You Anyway", it was first recorded by Tanya Tucker in 1976 for her third album with MCA Records. It was recorded at the Soundshop Studio, located in Nashville, Tennessee. The song was produced by Jerry Crutchfield, who had previously produced Tucker's last studio record with Columbia Records. "Gonna Love You Anyway" was first released on Tucker's 1976 MCA album titled Here's Some Love. The song was not issued as a single, but instead only appeared as an album cut. Thom Jurek of AllMusic compared the song's production to that of similar country rock styles evoked by Brenda Lee, in addition to several other album tracks.

== Cristy Lane version ==
"I'm Gonna Love You Anyway"

Single by Cristy Lane

from the album Cristy Lane Is the Name
- B-side: "I Can't Tell You"
- Released: March 1978
- Recorded: June 1977
- Studio: LS Studio
- Genre: Country; country pop
- Length: 2:08
- Label: LS
- Songwriter: Layng Martine Jr.
- Producer: Charlie Black

Cristy Lane singles chronology
"Shake Me I Rattle" (1977)	"I'm Gonna Love You Anyway" (1978)	"Penny Arcade" (1978)

=== Background and recording ===
After years attempting to launch his wife's country music singing career, Lee Stoller established his own recording label in the early 1970s titled LS Records. The couple also moved to Nashville, Tennessee and Lane soon began recording exclusively for the label. By 1976, two Lane singles made the national country charts: "Tryin' to Forget About You" and "Sweet Deceiver". In 1977 she had her first major hit with "Let Me Down Easy" and released the studio album Cristy Lane Is the Name in 1978. "I'm Gonna Love You Anyway" was included as part of the original album release in February 1978. The song was recorded in June 1977 at the LSI Studio, located in Nashville, Tennessee. The session was produced by Charlie Black.

=== Release and reception ===
"I'm Gonna Love You Anyway" was released as a single via LS Records in March 1978. It was backed by the A-side and B-side, "I Can't Tell You". Spending multiple weeks on the Billboard Hot Country Songs chart, the single peaked at number ten by mid 1977. It became Lane's second top ten hit in her music career. It would also be one of three top ten hits spawned from Lane's 1978 studio album Cristy Lane Is the Name. In reviewing her 2005 compilation titled Greatest Country Hits, Lindsay Planer of AllMusic positively commented that "I'm Gonna Love You Anyway" is a "rural rocker".

=== Track listing ===
7" vinyl single

- "I'm Gonna Love You Anyway" – 2:08
- "I Can't Tell You" – 3:11

=== Charts ===
Chart (1978)	Peak position
US Hot Country Singles (Billboard)	10
