= I Have a Dream (Cristy Lane album) =

Studio album by Cristy Lane
- Released: February 1981
- Recorded: September – December 1980
- Studios: LSI Studios; Island Recorders
- Genres: Country; Christian; country pop
- Labels: Liberty; LS
- Producers: Jerry Gillespie; Don Grierson; Lee Stoller

Cristy Lane chronology
Ask Me to Dance (1980)	I Have a Dream (1981)	Fragile – Handle with Care (1981)

Singles from I Have a Dream
- 1. "I Have a Dream" Released: December 1980; 2. "Love to Love You" Released: March 1981

I Have a Dream is a studio album by American Christian and country singer Cristy Lane. It was released in February 1981 via Liberty and LS Records and contained ten tracks. It was the sixth studio effort of Lane's recording career and the first to be issued with the Liberty Records. The project's title track became a top 20 hit on the American country chart in 1981 and the album also reached charting positions itself.

== Background and content ==
Cristy Lane had several years of major country hits during the late 1970s with songs like "Let Me Down Easy" and "I Just Can't Stay Married to You". In 1980, she reached the number one on the country chart with the gospel tune "One Day at a Time". I Have a Dream was inspired by the success of "One Day at a Time" and featured a mixture of country songs and Christian songs. The project contained a total of ten tracks. Its final cut was a medley of popular songs originally performed by Jim Reeves.

Additionally, the LP's title track was first recorded and made a hit internationally by Swedish pop group ABBA. The album also included cover versions of Ray Price's "For the Good Times" and the pop song "Everything I Own". Christian songs recorded for the album included "Give Them All to Jesus". I Have a Dream was recorded at LSI Studios and Island Recorders, both studio locations in Nashville, Tennessee. The sessions took place between September and December 1980. The album was produced by Jerry Gillespie, Don Grierson and Lee Stoller (Lane's husband and manager).

== Release and chart performance ==
I Have a Dream was released in February 1981 on Liberty Records and LS Records and was her sixth studio album. It was Lane's first studio offering with Liberty, which had previously been under the name United Artists. The project was originally offered as a vinyl LP and a cassette. I Have a Dream was her third album to reach a peak position on the Billboard Country Albums chart in the United States, peaking at number 35. The album was included on Billboard's year-end list of top country albums in December 1981. In New Zealand, the album was Lane's first to reach a peak position. The album's title track was issued as its first single in December 1980 on Liberty. The single peaked at number 17 on the Billboard country songs chart, becoming her final top 20 single there. "Love to Love You" was spawned as the album's second single in March 1981. The song peaked at number 21 on the Billboard country songs survey and also reached number 44 on the RPM Country chart in Canada.

== Track listing ==
Side one (vinyl and cassette versions)
No.	Title	Writer(s)	Length
1.	"I Have a Dream"	Benny Andersson; Björn Ulvaeus	4:00
2.	"Everything I Own"	David Gates	2:59
3.	"Give Them All to Jesus"	Phil Johnson	3:04
4.	"I'd Rather Be Sorry"	Kris Kristofferson	2:56
5.	"Love to Love You"	David Heavener	3:20

Side two (vinyl and cassette versions)
No.	Title	Writer(s)	Length
1.	"Give You Up to Get You Back"	Charlie Black; Rory Bourke; Jerry Gillespie	2:42
2.	"For the Good Times"	Kristofferson	4:00
3.	"Rio Grande"	Chapin Hartford	3:05
4.	"Loving You with My Eyes"	Margot Carroll; Mary Danoff	2:45
5.	"Medley" (Welcome to My World, He'll Have to Go, Four Walls)	Audrey Allison; Joe Allison; George Campbell; John Hathcock; Marvin Moore; Ray Winkler	2:46

== Personnel ==
All credits are adapted from the liner notes of I Have a Dream.

Musical personnel

- Eddy Anderson – Drums
- Hayward Bishop – Drums
- Charlie Black – Rhythm guitar, background vocals
- Kenneth Christensen – Keyboards
- Jason Clements – Children's vocals ("I Have a Dream)"
- Sheri Kramer – Background vocals
- Tommy Cogbil – Electric bass
- Sonny Garrish – Steel guitar
- Steve Gibson – Lead guitar
- Jerry Gillespie – Rhythm guitar
- The Shelly Kurland Strings – Strings
- Cristy Lane – Lead vocals
- Anne Marie – Background vocals
- Steve Messer – Electric bass
- Farrell Morris – Percussion
- Rodger Morris – Keyboards, synthesizer
- Louis Nunley – Background vocals
- Ron Oates – Keyboards
- Ellen Parker – Children's vocals ("I Have a Dream)"
- Daniel Peterson – Children's vocals ("I Have a Dream)"
- Susie Puett – Children's vocals ("I Have a Dream)"
- Billy Sanford – Lead guitar, rhythm guitar
- Steve Schaeffer – Electric bass
- Jason Sheridan – Children's vocals ("I Have a Dream)"
- Mike Shannon – Saxophone
- Marquetta Shannon – Children's vocals ("I Have a Dream)"
- Lisa Silver – Background vocals
- Diane Tidwell – Background vocals
- Jennifer Tidwell – Children's vocals ("I Have a Dream)"

Technical personnel

- Bill Burks – Art direction
- Danny Dunkleberger – Engineering
- Norma and Karen Gerson – Make-up and styling
- Jerry Gillespie – Producer
- Don Grierson – Executive producer
- Jeff Lancaster – Design
- Steve Messer – Engineering
- Ron Oates – String arrangement
- Peak Studio – Photo effects
- Tom Semmes – Engineering
- Dave Shipley – Engineering
- Lee Stoller – Executive producer, manager
- Bergen White – String arrangement

== Charts ==
Chart (1981)	Peak position
New Zealand (Recorded Music NZ)	33
US Top Country Albums (Billboard)	35

== Release history ==
Region	Date	Format	Label	Ref.
Canada	March 1980	Vinyl	United Artists Records; LS Records	
New Zealand	March 1980	Vinyl	United Artists Records; LS Records	
United States	March 1980	Vinyl	United Artists Records; LS Records	
United States	March 1980	Cassette	United Artists Records; LS Records	
