= Footprints in the Sand (album) =

Studio album by Cristy Lane
- Released: August 1983
- Recorded: April 1983
- Genre: Christian
- Label: Liberty; LS
- Producer: Lobo; Lee Stoller; James Stroud

Cristy Lane chronology
Here's to Us (1982)	Footprints in the Sand (1983)	Christmas Is the Man from Galilee (1983)

Singles from Footprints in the Sand
- 1. "I've Come Back (To Say I Love You One More Time)" Released: June 1983; 2. "Footprints in the Sand" Released: September 1983

Footprints in the Sand is a studio album by American Christian and country singer Cristy Lane. It was released in August 1983 via Liberty and LS Records. It contained ten tracks. The album was a collection of Christian recordings and was Lane's second album to consist entirely of this genre. The album also spawned two charting singles, including the title track.

== Background and content ==
Before transitioning into the Christian music market, Cristy Lane had a series of major country hits in the 1970s and 1980s. This included "Let Me Down Easy", "I Just Can't Stay Married to You" and the number one single "One Day at a Time". The latter recording was a Christian tune and its success prompted Lane to market herself more towards the genre. She issued her first gospel record in 1981 and Footprints in the Sand would soon follow. The album consisted of ten tracks of material. The title track was Lane's musical interpretation of the religious poem. It also included covers of other Christian tunes, such as "The Lord's Prayer". Original tracks were also included on the project, such as "I've Come Back (To Say I Love You One More Time)". Footprints in the Sand was recorded in April 1983 in Nashville, Tennessee. The record was produced by Lobo, Lee Stoller (Lane's husband) and James Stroud.

== Release and chart performance ==
Footprints in the Sand was released in August 1983 on Liberty and LS Records. It was Lane's tenth studio album in her music career. The album was originally offered as a vinyl LP and a cassette It was later offered as a compact disc in 1986. A compilation record with the same title was later released but had a different track listing with different recordings. Following its original release, Footprints in the Sand peaked at number 64 on the Billboard Top Country Albums chart. It was Lane's final studio effort to chart on the Billboard survey. Two singles were also spawned from the disc. The first single issued was "I've Come Back (To Say I Love You One More Time)" in June 1983. The song peaked at number 63 on the Billboard Hot Country Songs chart. The title track was released as the second single in September 1983. The song peaked at number on the same Billboard chart and was among Lane's final charting singles.

== Track listing ==
=== Vinyl and cassette versions ===
Side one
No.	Title	Writer(s)	Length
1.	"I've Come Back (To Say I Love You One More Time)"	Chuck Howard	3:55
2.	"Where I Belong"	Jerry Gillespie; Ed Penney	2:35
3.	"Understanding Heart"	Donald Rogers; John Rosasco	3:28
4.	"Let's Write a Love Song"	Clyde Otis; Eri Tanoue; Midori Tanoue	3:50
5.	"Miracle Maker"	Diana Willis	2:54
Total length:			16:42

Side two
No.	Title	Writer(s)	Length
1.	"Thank God and You for My Life"	Don Goodman; Becky Hobbs; Candy Parton	3:00
2.	"You're Healing My Heart"	Bill Aerts; Goodman; Susie LaVoie	3:47
3.	"You Make It Feel Like Sunday Again"	Goodman; Hobbs	2:25
4.	"Footprints in the Sand"	Diana Willis	3:00
5.	"The Lord's Prayer"	Albert Malotte	3:24
Total length:			15:36

=== Compact disc version ===
Footprints in the Sand (1986)
No.	Title	Writer(s)	Length
1.	"I've Come Back (To Say I Love You One More Time)"	Howard	3:55
2.	"Where I Belong"	Gillespie; Penney	2:35
3.	"Understanding Heart"	Rogers; Rosasco	3:28
4.	"Let's Write a Love Song"	Otis; E. Tanoue; M. Tanoue	3:50
5.	"Miracle Maker"	Willis	2:25
6.	"Thank God and You for My Life"	Goodman; Hobbs; Parton	3:00
7.	"You're Healing My Heart"	Aerts; Goodman; LaVoie	3:47
8.	"You Make It Feel Like Sunday Again"	Goodman; Hobbs	2:25
9.	"Footprints in the Sand"	Willis	3:00
10.	"The Lord's Prayer"	Malotte	2:22
Total length:			30:47

== Personnel ==
All credits are adapted from the liner notes of Footprints in the Sand.

Musical personnel

- Mitch Humphries – Keyboards
- Robert M. Johnson – Rhythm guitar
- Cristy Lane – Lead vocals
- Terry McMillan – Harmonica
- Kenny Mims – Electric guitar
- Larry Paxton – Bass guitar
- Willie Rainfores – Keyboards
- Brent Rowan – Acoustic guitar
- Steven Schaeffer – Bass guitar
- James Stroud – Drums
- Robert Wray – Bass guitar
- Pete Wade – Electric guitar
- Dennis Zimmerman – Electric guitar

Technical personnel

- Bill Deele – Arranger
- Tom Harding – Assistant engineer
- Lobo – Producer
- James Skipper – Arranger
- Lee Stoller – Executive producer, manager
- James Stroud – Producer

== Charts ==
Chart (1983)	Peak position
US Top Country Albums (Billboard)	64

== Release history ==
Region	Date	Format	Label	Ref.
United States; Canada	August 1983	Cassette; vinyl	Liberty Records	
United States	1986	Compact disc	EMI	
