= Ask Me to Dance (Cristy Lane album) =

Studio album by Cristy Lane
- Released: March 1980
- Recorded: November 1979 – January 1980
- Studio: LSI Studio
- Genres: Country; country pop
- Labels: United Artists; LS
- Producer: Jerry Gillespie

Cristy Lane chronology
| Simple Little Words (1979) | Ask Me to Dance (1980) | I Have a Dream (1981) |

Singles from Ask Me to Dance
- 1. "One Day at a Time" Released: March 1980; 2. "Sweet Sexy Eyes" Released: August 1980

Ask Me to Dance is a studio album by American Christian and country singer Cristy Lane. It was released in March 1980 via United Artists and LS Records and contained 11 tracks. It was the fifth studio album release of Lane's music career and her most commercially-successful, reaching the top 20 of the American country albums chart. Ask Me to Dance included Lane's signature and only number one single, "One Day at a Time". The album received positive reviews from critics following its release.

== Background and content ==
During the late 1970s Cristy Lane had several years of major commercial success as a country music artist. She had top ten hit singles with songs like "Let Me Down Easy" and "I Just Can't Stay Married to You", in addition to an accolade from the Academy of Country Music Awards. In 1980, Lane reached her commercial zenith with the Christian song, "One Day at a Time". The song's success as a country hit inspired the release of Ask Me to Dance.

The album contained a collection of 11 tracks, including the up-tempo title track and "I Knew the Mason". The disc's remaining songs were mostly "pop ballads", according to Greg Adams of AllMusic, highlighting Lane's cover of "Danny Boy" as an example. "One Day at a Time" was the project's only non-secular track and was penned by Kris Kristofferson. Ask Me to Dance was recorded at LSI Studios, beginning in 1979. Production for the project finished in January 1980 at the same studio. It was produced by songwriter Jerry Gillespie, who had previously composed tracks Lane had recorded for prior album releases.

== Release and reception ==
Professional ratings
Review scores
| Source | Rating |
|---|---|
| Allmusic | 4/5 stars |

Ask Me to Dance was released in March 1980 on United Artists Records and LS Records. It was Lane's fifth studio album released in her career and second issued with United Artists. The album was originally distributed as a vinyl LP and a cassette. The disc became Lane's third to reach a peak position on the Billboard country albums chart, reaching number 14. It was Lane's highest-peaking album on the chart. Ask Me to Dance received a positive review from AllMusic's Greg Adams, gave it four out of five stars. Adams compared Lane's music style to that of Lynn Anderson due to her "innocuous, broadly-appealing variety of country [that] would have made her a Lawrence Welk Show favorite." Adams also praised Lane's "well-enunciated" vocal style and the record's "slick pop production".

Ask Me to Dance included two single releases. Prior to the album's release, "One Day a Time" was issued as a single via United Artists Records in March 1980. The song became Lane's first (and only) single to peak at number one on the Billboard Hot Country Songs chart. In addition, the single reached number ten on the RPM Country Songs survey in Canada. In August 1980, "Sweet Sexy Eyes" was spawned as the disc's second single via United Artists Records. The song was titled "Sexy Eyes" on the LP's original track listing. It reached number eight on the Billboard country songs chart, becoming her final top ten single there. In Canada, the single peaked at number 16 on the RPM country chart, becoming her final top 20 single there.

== Track listing ==
Side one (vinyl and cassette versions)
| No. | Title | Writer(s) | Length |
|---|---|---|---|
| 1. | "Ask Me to Dance" | Buddy Kalb | 3:24 |
| 2. | "Once or Twice" | Carol Anderson; Robert Parsons | 2:42 |
| 3. | "I Will" | Dick Glasser | 2:40 |
| 4. | "Eyes of Misty Blue" | Dennis Weaver | 3:17 |
| 5. | "I Knew the Mason" | Chapin Hartford | 3:05 |

Side two (vinyl and cassette versions)
| No. | Title | Writer(s) | Length |
|---|---|---|---|
| 1. | "Sweet Sexy Eyes" | Robert Jenkins | 2:47 |
| 2. | "One Day at a Time" | Kris Kristofferson; Marijohn Wilkin | 3:12 |
| 3. | "Maybe I'm Thinkin'" | Jim Greene; Jack Miller | 3:07 |
| 4. | "First Time in a Long Time" | Bob Stone | 3:20 |
| 5. | "Danny Boy" | Traditional | 3:24 |
| 6. | "Ask Me to Dance" (Reprise) | Kalb | 0:41 |

== Personnel ==
All credits are adapted from the liner notes of Ask Me to Dance.

Musical personnel

- Charlie Black – Rhythm guitar
- Jerry Carrigan – Drums
- Buddy Harman – Drums
- Jerry Gillespie – Lead vocals
- Jon Goin – Electric guitar
- Jim Greene – Background vocals
- Sheri Kramer – Background vocals
- Sheridan Kurland Strings – Strings
- Cristy Lane – Lead vocals
- Mike Lawler – Synthesizer bass
- Anne Marine – Background vocals
- Terry McMillan – Harmonica
- Jack Miller – Background vocals
- Bob Moore – Bass
- Fred Newell – Electric guitar
- Ron Oates – Piano
- Bobby Ogdin – Piano
- Steve Schaeffer – Bass
- Dan Sheffield – Trumpet
- Lisa Silver – Background vocals
- Diane Tidwell – Background vocals
- Jim Well – Background vocals

Technical personnel

- Norma Gerson – Make-up
- Jerry Gillespie – Producer
- Steve Moser – Engineer
- Ron Oates – Arranger
- Danny Purcell – Mastering
- Lee Stoller – Management
- Bergen White – Arranger

== Charts ==
| Chart (1980) | Peak position |
|---|---|
| US Top Country Albums (Billboard) | 14 |

== Release history ==
| Region | Date | Format | Label | Ref. |
|---|---|---|---|---|
| Canada | March 1980 | Vinyl | LS Records; United Artists Records | |
| United Kingdom | March 1980 | Vinyl | LS Records; United Artists Records | |
| United States | March 1980 | Vinyl | LS Records; United Artists Records | |
| United States | March 1980 | Cassette | LS Records; United Artists Records | |
