= Here's to Us =

Studio album by Cristy Lane
- Released: December 1982
- Recorded: April 1982
- Genre: Country; country pop
- Label: Liberty; LS
- Producer: Ron Oates

Cristy Lane chronology
One Day at a Time (1981)	Here's to Us (1982)	Footprints in the Sand (1983)

Singles from Here's to Us
- 1. "The Good Old Days" Released: September 1982

Here's to Us is a studio album by American Christian and country singer Cristy Lane. It was released in December 1982 via Liberty and LS Records and contained a total of ten tracks. It was the ninth studio album of Lane's career and spawned one single to country music radio titled "The Good Old Days". The single charted on the American country survey in 1982. The album itself also reached a charting position on the American country albums list.

== Background and content ==
During the late 1970s and early 1980s, Cristy Lane had commercial success in country music with songs like "Let Me Down Easy" and "I Just Can't Stay Married to You". In 1980 she reached the number one spot with the Christian-themed "One Day at a Time", which brought her more public exposure. However, following the single's success, her commercial popularity began to wane, but she continued recording secular country material before transitioning to Christian music in the middle 1980s. Among these albums was 1982's Here's to Us.

The project contained a total of ten tracks. The album featured a mixture of original recordings and covers of previously recorded songs. Among its new tracks was "The Good Old Days" and the title track. Covers included Skeeter Davis' "The End of the World" and the Bee Gees' "Lost in Your Love". Here's to Us was recorded in April 1982 in sessions held in Nashville, Tennessee. The album was produced by Ron Oates.

== Release and chart performance ==
Here's to Us was released in December 1982 on Liberty Records and LS Records. It was ninth studio album of Lane's career. It was issued as a vinyl LP with five tracks on either side of the record. It was her fifth LP to reach the Billboard Top Country Albums chart, peaking at number 42. It was also among her final albums to reach the country albums chart. The project included one single release, which was Lane's original track "The Good Old Days". The song was released as a single in September 1982 on Liberty Records. The song later charted on the Billboard Hot Country Songs chart, peaking at number 81. It was Lane's lowest-charting single on the country survey and among her final singles to reach a peak position.

== Track listing ==
Side one
No.	Title	Writer(s)	Length
1.	"The Good Old Days"	Lynda Lance; Ron Oates	3:07
2.	"He Just Takes Me"	Dottie Rambo	3:29
3.	"When the Hurtin' Ends"	Bud Lee; Clive Westlake	3:20
4.	"Lost in Your Love"	Barry Gibb	2:43
5.	"I Love You So Much It Hurts"	Jackie DeShannon; Jimmie Holiday; Randy Myers	3:01

Side two
No.	Title	Writer(s)	Length
1.	"Beautiful Sunday"	Daniel Boone; Rod McQueen	3:06
2.	"One More Lie"	Rich Smith; Dean Wenzel	3:19
3.	"Here's to Us"	Byron Hill; Lee	3:04
4.	"The Power of Love"	Hill; Lee	2:30
5.	"End of the World"	Sylvia Dee; Arthur Kent	3:24

== Personnel ==
All credits are adapted from the liner notes of Here's to Us.

Musical personnel

- Ken Bell – Acoustic guitar, electric rhythm guitar
- Larry Byrom – Electric guitar, electric lead guitar
- Buzz Cason – Background vocals
- Clay Caire – Drums
- Mark Casstevens – Acoustic guitar
- Doug Clement – Background vocals
- Mary Fielder – Background vocals
- Jon Goin – Acoustic guitar, electric guitar
- Lynda K. Lance – Background vocals
- The Linda K. Singers – Background vocals
- Anne Marie – Background vocals
- Terry McMillan – Harmonica
- Farell Morris – Percussion
- Nashville String Machine – Strings
- Louis Nunnley – Background vocals
- Ron Oates – Keyboards, percussion, prepared piano, synthesizer
- Joe Osborn – Bass
- Steve Schaeffer – Bass
- Donna Sheridan – Background vocals
- Reggie Young – Acoustic guitar, electric guitar
- Bergen White – Background vocals

Technical personnel

- David Brandt – Photography
- Jonathan Losie – Album design
- Henry Marquez – Art direction
- Ron Oates – Producer

== Charts ==
Chart (1982)	Peak position
US Top Country Albums (Billboard)	42

== Release history ==
Region	Date	Format	Label	Ref.
Canada	December 1982	Vinyl	Liberty Records; LS Records	
New Zealand	December 1982	Vinyl	Liberty Records; LS Records	
United States	December 1982	Vinyl	Liberty Records; LS Records	
