= One Day at a Time (Cristy Lane album) =

1981 studio album by Cristy Lane

Studio album by Cristy Lane
- Released: 1981; 1982; 1983; 1986; 1988; 1989
- Recorded: November – December 1980
- Genre: Christian; gospel
- Label: LS; Liberty; Arrival; Capitol
- Producer: Ron Oates

Cristy Lane chronology
Fragile – Handle with Care (1981)	One Day at a Time (1981)	Here's to Us (1982)

1989 re-release cover

One Day at a Time (later retitled One Day at a Time - Uplifting Songs of Faith and Inspiration) is a studio album by American Christian and country music singer Cristy Lane. It was first released in December 1981 via LS Records. It was Lane's eighth studio project in her music career and her first album of entirely Christian material. Included on the album was Lane's number one single, "One Day at a Time", along with covers of various gospel hymns. The record charted in various countries following its 1981 release.

In 1983, Lane's biography was released and sold on television in conjunction with One Day at a Time. The television advertisements brought increased sales to the album and it was re-released on several occasions. In 1982, it was released via Liberty Records and in 1983 on Arrival Records. Later in the decade, the album was released in a CD format with additional tracks added, while others were omitted.

== Background and content ==
In the late 1970s and early 1980s, Cristy Lane had several major hit singles on the North American country charts with songs like "Let Me Down Easy" and "I Just Can't Stay Married to You". In 1980, the Christian song "One Day at a Time" reached number one on the Billboard country singles chart and became the biggest hit of her career. The song influenced Lane to transition her music career towards the Christian market. Her 1981 One Day at a Time LP would be her first Christian-themed project following the song's success. The album's original track listing was a collection of 18 Christian and gospel songs, including the title tune. Also featured on the project was Lane's interpretations of traditional Christian hymns like "Amazing Grace", "Just a Closer Walk with Thee", "Rock of Ages" and "In the Garden". When the album was re-released, several recordings were omitted, limiting the track listing to 12 songs. One Day at a Time was first recorded between and November and December 1980 in sessions held in Nashville, Tennessee. The sessions were produced by Ron Oates.

== Release and chart performance ==
One Day at a Time was originally released in December 1981 on LS Records. It was originally offered as a vinyl LP, containing nine songs on both sides of the record. The original project was sold on television. In 1983, Lane's biography book was released in conjunction with the re-release of the album on Arrival Records. The re-release only included 14 songs. Both the book and album were sold on television through direct marketing advertisements in an eight-dollar combination package. Nine cable networks and 120 affiliate television stations aired Lane's album. Through direct television marketing, the album has been estimated to have sold over one million records.

In 1986, LS Records re-released the album with different track listing in a cassette format. The new release featured the recordings "Ave Maria" and "I Love You More Everyday". Through Capitol Records's "EMI Music Special Markets" division, One Day at a Time was re-issued in 1988 and again in 1989. The track listing on the 1988 version featured two of Lane's Christian-themed singles that had not been issued on prior releases of the album. Both "I Have a Dream" and "Footprints in the Sand" were featured on the Capitol release. They were also featured on the 1989 CD release. A digital version of the Capitol LP was released decades later.

The original 1981 album on LS Records would become Lane's first to reach a peak position on the Billboard Top Christian Albums chart, peaking at number 17. It was also her first album to reach a peak position on the New Zealand albums chart, peaking in the top ten at number six.

== Track listings ==
=== Original version ===
Side one (vinyl and cassette versions)
No.	Title	Writer(s)	Length
1.	"One Day at a Time"	Kris Kristofferson; Marijohn Wilkin	3:17
2.	"Whispering Hope"	Septimus Winner	2:46
3.	"Everything Is Beautiful"	Ray Stevens	3:29
4.	"Just a Closer Walk with Thee"	Traditional	2:37
5.	"In the Garden"	C. Austin Miles	3:00
6.	"Try a Little Kindness"	Bobby Austin; Curt Sapaugh	2:40
7.	"Rock of Ages"	Augustus Toplady	1:42
8.	"You Got the Power"	Kenny O'Dell; Austin Roberts	2:43
9.	"Softly and Tenderly"	Will L. Thompson	3:07

Side two (vinyl and cassette versions)
No.	Title	Writer(s)	Length
1.	"Give Them All to Jesus"	Phil Johnson	3:06
2.	"How Great Thou Art"	Traditional	5:12
3.	"Why Me"	Kristofferson	2:50
4.	"He's Got the Whole World in His Hands"	Traditional	2:45
5.	"Peace in the Valley"	Thomas A. Dorsey	2:19
6.	"I'll Rise Again"	Andre Roosevelt	2:57
7.	"It Is No Secret"	Stuart Hamblen	2:31
8.	"Amazing Grace"	John Newton	2:24
9.	"I Believe"	Ervin Drake; Irvin Graham; Jimmy Shirl; Al Stillman	2:38

=== 1982 version ===
Side one (LP version)
No.	Title	Writer(s)	Length
1.	"One Day at a Time"	Kristofferson; Wilkin	3:17
2.	"Amazing Grace"	Newton	2:24
3.	"I Believe"	Drake; Graham; Shirl; Stillman	2:38
4.	"Everything Is Beautiful"	Stevens	3:29
5.	"Why Me"	Kristofferson	2:50
6.	"He's Got the Whole World in His Hands"	Traditional	2:45

Side two (LP version)
No.	Title	Writer(s)	Length
1.	"Just a Closer Walk with Thee"	Traditional	2:37
2.	"Try a Little Kindness"	Bobby Austin; Sapaugh	2:40
3.	"It Is No Secret"	Hamblen	2:31
4.	"Peace in the Valley"	Dorsey	2:19
5.	"Whispering Hope"	Winner	2:46
6.	"Rock of Ages"	Toplady	1:42

=== 1983 version ===
Side one (vinyl and cassette versions)
No.	Title	Writer(s)	Length
1.	"One Day at a Time"	Kristofferson; Wilkin	3:17
2.	"Whispering Hope"	Winner	2:46
3.	"Just a Closer Walk with Thee"	Traditional	2:37
4.	"You Got the Power"	O'Dell; Roberts	2:43
5.	"Softly and Tenderly"	Thompson	3:07
6.	"It Is No Secret"	Hamblen	2:31
7.	"He's Got the Whole World in His Hands"	Traditional	2:45

Side one (vinyl and cassette versions)
No.	Title	Writer(s)	Length
1.	"How Great Thou Art"	Traditional	5:12
2.	"Peace in the Valley"	Dorsey	2:19
3.	"Rise Again"	Roosevelt	2:57
4.	"Give Them All to Jesus"	Johnson	3:06
5.	"I Knew the Mason"	Chapin Hartford	3:13
6.	"Rock of Ages"	Toplady	1:42
7.	"Amazing Grace"	Newton	2:24

=== 1986 version ===
Side one (Cassette version)
No.	Title	Writer(s)	Length
1.	"One Day at a Time"	Kristofferson; Wilkin	3:17
2.	"Just as I Am"	Charlotte Elliott	2:47
3.	"Just a Closer Walk with Thee"	Traditional	2:37
4.	"Amazing Grace"	Newton	2:24
5.	"Rock of Ages"	Toplady	1:42
6.	"Softly and Tenderly"	Thompson	3:07

Side two (Cassette version)
No.	Title	Writer(s)	Length
1.	"In the Garden"	Miles	3:00
2.	"Ave Maria"	Traditional	3:03
3.	"Give Them All to Jesus"	Johnson	3:06
4.	"Whispering Hope"	Winner	2:46
5.	"I Love You More Everyday"	Jimmie Young	3:12
6.	"He's Got the Whole World in His Hands"	Traditional	2:45
7.	"Why Me Lord"	Kristofferson	2:50

=== 1988 version ===
Side one (Cassette version)
No.	Title	Writer(s)	Length
1.	"You Got the Power"	O'Dell; Roberts	2:43
2.	"Rise Again"	Roosevelt	2:57
3.	"Just a Closer Walk with Thee"	Traditional	2:37
4.	"In the Garden"	Miles	3:00
5.	"Whispering Hope"	Winner	2:46

Side two (Cassette version)
No.	Title	Writer(s)	Length
1.	"One Day at a Time"	Kristofferson; Wilkin	3:17
2.	"I Have a Dream"	Benny Andersson; Björn Ulvaeus	3:59
3.	"Footprints in the Sand"	Lee Stoller	3:04
4.	"Give Them All to Jesus"	Johnson	3:06

=== 1995 CD/Cassette release ===
1995 CD/Cassette
No.	Title	Writer(s)	Length
1.	"One Day at a Time"	Kristofferson; Wilkin	3:17
2.	"I Love You More Everyday"	Young	3:12
3.	"Just a Closer Walk with Thee"	Traditional	2:37
4.	"Precious Memories"	Lane	4:03
5.	"Rock of Ages"	Toplady	1:42
6.	"He's Got the Whole World in His Hands"	Traditional	2:45
7.	"Just as I Am"	Elliott	2:47
8.	"In the Garden"	Miles	3:00
9.	"Whispering Hope"	Winner	2:46
10.	"Ave Maria"	Traditional	3:03

=== 1989/2008 CD and digital versions ===
One Day at a Time - Uplifting Songs of Faith and Inspiration (1989/2008 CD and digital versions)
No.	Title	Writer(s)	Length
1.	"One Day at a Time"	Kristofferson; Wilkin	3:17
2.	"I Have a Dream"	Andersson; Ulvaeus	3:59
3.	"Footprints in the Sand"	Stoller	3:04
4.	"Give Them All to Jesus"	Johnson	3:06
5.	"Rise Again"	Roosevelt	2:57
6.	"Just a Closer Walk with Thee"	Traditional	2:37
7.	"In the Garden"	Miles	3:00
8.	"You Got the Power"	O'Dell; Roberts	2:43
9.	"Why Me Lord"	Kristofferson	2:50
10.	"Whispering Hope"	Winner	2:46
11.	"Everything Is Beautiful"	Stevens	3:29
12.	"Amazing Grace"	Newton	2:24

== Charts ==
Chart (1981)	Peak position
New Zealand (Recorded Music NZ)	6
US Top Christian Albums (Billboard)	17

== Release history ==
Region	Date	Format	Label	Ref.
United States	1981	Vinyl; cassette	LS Records	
New Zealand	1982	Vinyl	Liberty Records	
United States	1983	Vinyl; cassette	Arrival Records	
United States	1986	Cassette	LS Records	
United States	1988	Cassette	EMI Music Special Markets	
United States	1989	Compact disc	EMI Music Special Markets	
United States	1995	Compact disc; cassette	Arrival Records	
United States	2008	Compact disc	EMI Music Special Markets	
United States	2010s	Music download	EMI Music Special Markets	
