= Love Lies (Cristy Lane album) =

Studio album by Cristy Lane
- Released: December 1978
- Recorded: March 1977 – October 1978
- Studio: LSI Studio
- Genres: Country; country pop
- Label: LS
- Producer: Charlie Black

Cristy Lane chronology
Cristy Lane Is the Name (1978)	Love Lies (1978)	Simple Little Words (1979)

Singles from Love Lies
- 1. "Sweet Deceiver" Released: May 1977; 2. "I Just Can't Stay Married to You" Released: November 1978

Love Lies is a studio album by American Christian and country music artist Cristy Lane. It was released in December 1978 via LS Records and contained 12 tracks. The album was the third released in Lane's music career and contained two singles. Its second single release, "I Just Can't Stay Married to You," became a top five country hit in both the United States and Canada. Love Lies received positive reviews from music critics and publications.

== Background and content ==
After establishing his own record label, Lee Stoller began exclusively recording his wife (Cristy Lane) for his newly formed LS Records. Lane began recording music for the country market through the label. In 1977, she had her first hit with "Let Me Down Easy". Earlier in 1978, she released her first album with LS, which included "Let Me Down Easy". With her new success, Lane returned to the recording studio in October 1978 with producer Charlie Black to cut nine tracks that would help comprise Love Lies. A total of 12 tracks were included on the album. Three additional songs were cut as early as March 1977, including the single "Sweet Deceiver". Included on Love Lies was a cover of the pop hit "My Heart Cries for You". It also featured three original tracks co-written by Charlie Black, including the future single "I Just Can't Stay Married to You". Lee Stoller also penned a track for the album titled "Somebody's Baby".

== Release and reception ==
Professional ratings
Review scores
Source	Rating
Allmusic	4/5 stars

Love Lies was released in December 1978 via LS Records. It was Lane's second studio release for LS and the third album release of her career. The album was distributed as a vinyl LP, containing six tracks on either side of the record. Love Lies would be her first LP to chart on the Billboard country albums survey, peaking at number 44. The album was featured on the first page of Billboard magazine in March 1979. The publication commented that the LP "contains 12 great songs" and also highlighted her multiple hit singles up to that point. Greg Adams of AllMusic also gave Love Lies a positive response in his review, rating the album at four stars. He called the album's sound to be "bright" and "chippy", while describing Lane's voice with a "girl-next-door" vocal delivery. "Fans of Lane's early country recordings will agree that Love Lies ranks among her best efforts," Adams concluded.

Love Lies contained two songs that were first released as a singles. In May 1977, the track "Sweet Deceiver" was first released as a single via LS Records. It became her second single to reach the Billboard Hot Country Songs chart, peaking at number 53 in 1977. In November 1978, "I Just Can't Stay Married to You" was released as a single also on the LS label. Spending multiple weeks on the Billboard country singles chart, the song peaked at number five in 1979, becoming Lane's highest-charting single up to that point. On Canada's RPM Country Singles survey, the single would reach number four, becoming her second top ten hit in Canada.

== Track listing ==
Side one
No.	Title	Writer(s)	Length
1.	"Love Lies"	Charlie Black; Skippy Barrett	3:16
2.	"Rainsong"	Chapin Hartford; Jeff Savasano	4:08
3.	"Somebody's Baby"	Lee Stoller	2:58
4.	"My Heart Cries for You"	Percy Faith; Carl Sigman	2:31
5.	"Hold On"	Bill Wence	2:34
6.	"Out of Sight, Not Out of Mind"	Holly Dunn; Chris Waters	3:02

Side two
No.	Title	Writer(s)	Length
1.	"I Just Can't Stay Married to You"	Black; Rory Bourke; Jerry Gillespie	2:49
2.	"Come to My Love"	Sam Lorber; Jeff Silbar	2:32
3.	"Love Storms"	Dan Willis	2:24
4.	"He's Back in Town"	Cristy Lane; Fred Newell	3:41
5.	"Sweet Deceiver"	Boudleaux & Felice Bryant	2:30
6.	"Give Me Back My Heart"	Black; Bourke; Gillespie	2:09

== Personnel ==
All credits are adapted from the liner notes of Love Lies.

Musical personnel

- Charlie Black – Background vocals, guitar
- Harold Bradley – Guitar, mandolin
- Susie Callaway – Background vocals
- Jerry Carrigan – Drums
- Johnny Christopher – Guitar
- Rita Figlio – Background vocals
- Don Gant – Background vocals
- Gregg Galbraith – Guitar
- Sonny Garrish – Steel guitar
- Randy Goodrum – Piano
- Jon Goin – Guitar
- The Leah Jane Singers – Background vocals
- Sherri Kramer – Background vocals
- The Shelly Kurland Strings – Strings
- Cristy Lane – Lead vocals
- Mike Lawler – Synthesizer
- Larry Londin – Drums
- Craig Mirijanian – Drums
- Bob Moore – Bass
- Weldon Myrick – Steel guitar
- Fred Newell – Guitar
- Ron Oates – Piano
- Joe Osborn – Bass
- Steve Schaeffer – Bass
- Lisa Silver – Background vocals
- Diane Tidwell – Background vocals
- Chip Young – Guitar

Technical personnel

- Charlie Black – Producer
- Herb Burnette – Photography
- Glenn Meadows – Mastering
- Farrell Morris – Percussion
- Steve Moser – Engineering and recording
- Lee Stoller – Manager
- Bergen White – String arrangement

== Charts ==
Chart (1978)	Peak position
US Top Country Albums (Billboard)	44

== Release history ==
Region	Date	Format	Label	Ref.
United States	December 1978	Vinyl	LS Records	
Canada	December 1978	Vinyl	GRT Records	
