= Harbor Lights (Cristy Lane album) =

Studio album by Cristy Lane
- Released: 1985
- Genre: Country; traditional pop
- Label: LS
- Producer: Kenneth Christensen; Lee Stoller

Cristy Lane chronology
Christmas Is the Man from Galilee (1983)	Harbor Lights (1985)	Cristy Lane Salutes the G.I.'s of Vietnam (1986)

Harbor Lights is a studio album by American Christian and country music singer Cristy Lane. It was released in 1985 via LS Records. The original album contained a total of 14 tracks featuring a mixture of country and traditional pop music standards. It was Lane's twelfth studio recording in her career.

== Background ==
During the late 1970s and early 1980s, Cristy Lane had commercial country music success with the top ten songs "Let Me Down Easy" and "I Just Can't Stay Married to You". In 1980, she reached her commercial zenith with the number one single, "One Day at a Time". The Christian track pointed Lane's career in a new direction and it became the subject of an autobiography, as well as several gospel recordings. Lane had been signed to Liberty Records (along with still remaining with the independent LS label), but left her contract in the mid 1980s.

== Content and release ==
Harbor Lights contained 14 covers of traditional pop music standards such as "Allegheny Moon", "Que Sera, Sera" and "Love Letters in the Sand". Two new recordings were added as well. Both songs were originally composed by Lane herself. The album was co-produced by Lane's husband, Lee Stoller. Kenneth Christensen also contributed to the record's production. The project was first released in 1985 via LS Records as a vinyl LP.

A cassette version with an identical track listing was also released in 1985. It was re-issued on Arrival Records in 1986 with the same track listing.

== Track listing ==
Side one (vinyl and cassette versions)
No.	Title	Writer(s)	Length
1.	"Harbor Lights"	Jimmy Kennedy; Hugh Williams
2.	"Fascination"	Dick Manning; Fermo Dante Marchetti
3.	"Allegheny Moon"	Al Hoffman; Dick Manning
4.	"San Francisco"	George Cory; Douglass Cross
5.	"Believin' in Your Love"	Cristy Lane
6.	"Love Letters in the Sand"	J. Fred Coots; Charles Kenny; Nick Kenny
7.	"Smoke Gets in Your Eyes"	Otto Harbach; Jerome Kern

Side two (vinyl and cassette versions)
No.	Title	Writer(s)	Length
1.	"Always on My Mind"	Wayne Carson; Johnny Christopher; Mark James
2.	"It's Down to You and Me"	Cristy Lane
3.	"More"	Alex Alstone; Tom Glazer
4.	"The Shadow of Your Smile"	Johnny Mandel; Paul Francis Webster
5.	"To Each His Own"	Ray Evans; Jay Livingston
6.	"Que Sera, Sera"	Evans; Livingston
7.	"Danny Boy"	Frederic Weatherly

== Release history ==
Region	Date	Format	Label	Ref.
United States	1985	Cassette; vinyl	LS Records	
United States	1986	Vinyl	Arrival Records	
