= Sweet Sexy Eyes =

Single by Cristy Lane

from the album Ask Me to Dance
- B-side: "Maybe I'm Thinkin'"
- Released: August 1980
- Recorded: November 1979
- Studio: LSI Studio
- Genre: Country; country pop
- Length: 2:47
- Label: United Artists
- Songwriter: Robert Jenkins
- Producer: Jerry Gillespie

Cristy Lane singles chronology
"One Day at a Time" (1980)	"Sweet Sexy Eyes" (1980)	"I Have a Dream" (1980)

"Sweet Sexy Eyes" is a song written by Robert Jenkins that was originally recorded by American Christian and country singer Cristy Lane. It was released as a single via United Artists Records in August 1980 and reached major positions on the North American country charts. The song received positive reviews following its release.

== Background and recording ==
In the late 1970s, Cristy Lane achieved commercial country music success with hits like "Let Me Down Easy", "Shake Me I Rattle" and "I Just Can't Stay Married to You". In 1980, she had her biggest hit with Christian-themed "One Day at a Time". Its follow-up single ("Sweet Sexy Eyes") would also become a major hit in 1980. "Sweet Sexy Eyes" was a song composed by Robert Jenkins. It was recorded in November 1979 at LSI Studios, a Nashville, Tennessee recording studio owned by Lane's husband and manager Lee Stoller. The session was produced by Jerry Gillespie, a songwriter whom Lane had previously cut songs by. It was among her first experiences recording with Gillespie.

== Release and reception ==
"Sweet Sexy Eyes" was first released on Lane's fifth studio album in March 1980 titled Ask Me to Dance. On the disc, the song was titled "Sexy Eyes". In August 1980, it was issued as a single on United Artists Records under the name "Sweet Sexy Eyes". It was backed on the B-side with the song "Maybe I'm Thinkin", which was also taken from Lane's fifth studio album. Spending multiple weeks on the Billboard Hot Country Singles chart, "Sweet Sexy Eyes" eventually peaked at number eight on the survey. It was her final single to reach a top ten position on the chart. In addition, the single also peaked at number 16 on the RPM Country Songs list in Canada, becoming her final top 20 single there. "Sweet Sexy Eyes" received positive reviews from writers, including Greg Adams who called its production "slick pop", along with Lane's "well-enunciated" singing style. Lindsay Planer of AllMusic described it as a "power ballad" that demonstrated "Lane's ability to effortlessly vacillate between edgier material and a comparatively affective performance style."

== Track listing ==
7" vinyl single

- "Sweet Sexy Eyes" – 2:47
- "Maybe I'm Thinkin'" – 3:07

== Charts ==
Chart (1980)	Peak position
Canada Country Songs (RPM)	16
US Hot Country Singles (Billboard)	8
