= Cristy Lane Is the Name =

Studio album by Cristy Lane
- Released: February 1978
- Recorded: May 1976 – June 1977
- Studio: LSI Studio
- Genres: Country; soft pop
- Label: LS
- Producer: Charlie Black

Cristy Lane chronology
Cristy Lane Salutes G.I.'s of Viet Nam (1969)	Cristy Lane Is the Name (1978)	Love Lies (1978)

Singles from Cristy Lane Is the Name
- 1. "Midnight Blue" Released: June 1976; 2. "By the Way" Released: August 1976; 3. "Tryin' to Forget About You" Released: January 1977; 4. "Let Me Down Easy" Released: August 1977; 5. "Shake Me I Rattle" Released: November 1977; 6. "I'm Gonna Love You Anyway" Released: March 1978; 7. "Penny Arcade" Released: June 1978

Cristy Lane Is the Name is a studio album by American country and Christian singer Cristy Lane. The album was released in February 1978 via LS Records and contained a total of 12 tracks. It was the second album issued in Lane's recording career and the first of many to be released on the LS label. The album featured seven singles releases, four of which became major hits on the North American country music charts between 1977 and 1978: "Let Me Down Easy", "Shake Me I Rattle", "I'm Gonna Love You Anyway" and "Penny Arcade". The album received positive reviews following its release.

== Background and content ==
Cristy Lane began a singing career in the 1960s following her husband's (Lee Stoller) discovery of her musical talent. In her earliest dates, Lane performed in nightclubs and toured overseas in Vietnam for American troops. After several years of rejection from the music industry Stoller and Lane moved to Nashville, Tennessee where she could pursue a country music career. Stoller established his own record label during this period titled LS Records and began promoting her records. Stoller arranged for his wife to record her first sessions for her eventual second album beginning in May 1976. Over the next two years (through June 1977), Lane recorded a variety of songs that would comprise Cristy Lane Is the Name. All sessions were held at LSI Studios, located in Nashville. The sessions were produced by Nashville songwriter, Charlie Black.

The project was a collection of 12 tracks of material. The album featured compositions originally recorded by others, including Melissa Manchester's pop hit "Midnight Blue" and Marion Worth's "Shake Me I Rattle". New material for the album included "Penny Arcade" and "I Can't Tell You" (the latter was co-written by Lane and Charlie Black). The album featured liner notes from disc jockey Chris Lane, who helped establish her early music career in Peoria, Illinois.

== Release and reception ==
Five singles were released to country music radio prior to the album's release. The album's first single was Lane's cover of "Midnight Blue," which was issued on LS Records in June 1976. It was followed that August with the song "By the Way". The album's third single, "Tryin' to Forget About You," was issued in January 1977 on LS. It was her first to reach the Billboard Hot Country Songs chart, peaking at number 52. The fourth single spawned from the LP was "Let Me Down Easy", which was first issued in August 1977. The single was Lane's first major hit in her career, peaking at number seven on the Billboard country songs chart. "Shake Me I Rattle" was released as the LP's fifth single, which occurred in November 1977. The song reached the top 20 on the Billboard country singles chart, peaking at number 16. On Canada's RPM Country Singles survey, both "Let Me Down Easy" and "Shake Me I Rattle" climbed to the number 28 position.

In February 1978, Cristy Lane Is the Name was released on the LS label. It was issued as a vinyl LP, containing six tracks on either side of the record. The album was licensed by GRT Records, which is credited on the album information featured on the record. In March 1978, LS spawned the album's sixth single titled "I'm Gonna Love You Anyway". It became her second top ten hit on the Billboard country songs chart, climbing to the number ten position. The project's seventh and final single release was issued in June 1978: "Penny Arcade". The track was Lane's third top ten hit, peaking at number seven on the Hot Country Songs chart. It also became her first top ten hit in Canada. Cristy Lane Is the Name received a positive response from Billboard magazine, which named it among its "Top Album Picks" in February 1978. Reviewers commented that the album's "exceptional production by [Charlie] Black brings Lane's soft and flowing vocals upfront while combining a pleasant backdrop of musical stylings for the variety of material included."

== Track listing ==
Side one
No.	Title	Writer(s)	Length
1.	"Let Me Down Easy"	Lobo; Billy Sandlin; Barry Windslow	2:36
2.	"Midnight Blue"	Carole Bayer Sager; Melissa Manchester	2:50
3.	"By the Way"	Daniel & S. Gibb	2:29
4.	"Shake Me I Rattle"	Hal Hackady; Charles Naylor	2:59
5.	"Take Your Baby Home"	Charlie Black	3:22
6.	"I'm Gonna Love You Anyway"	Layng Martine Jr.	2:08

Side two
No.	Title	Writer(s)	Length
1.	"I Can't Tell You"	Black; Cristy Lane	3:10
2.	"Trying to Forget About You"	Boudleaux & Felice Bryant	2:25
3.	"Love's Gonna Shine on Again"	Alice Keister; Bob Morrison	2:25
4.	"Take Your Love Away"	Randy Sharp	2:58
5.	"Penny Arcade"	B. & F. Bryant	2:35
6.	"Never Think I Still Don't Love You"	Lobo	3:11

== Personnel ==
All credits are adapted from the liner notes of Cristy Lane Is the Name.

Musical personnel

- Charlie Black – Acoustic guitar, background vocals, electric guitar
- Harold Bradley – Electric guitar
- Kenneth Buttrey – Drums
- David Byrd – Keyboards
- Sadie Callaway – Background vocals
- Jerry Carrigan – Drums
- Charlie Chappelear – Bass
- Rita Figlio – Background vocals
- Sonny Garrish – Steel guitar
- Steve Gibson – Electric guitar
- Jerry Gillespie – Acoustic guitar
- Jim Isbell – Drums
- Shane Keister – Keyboards
- Dave Kirby – Acoustic guitar
- The Shelly Kurland Strings – Strings
- Cristy Lane – Background, lead vocals
- Kenny Malone – Drums
- Bill McMath – Acoustic guitar
- The Alan Moore Singers – Background vocals
- Weldon Myrick – Steel guitar
- Fred Newell – Electric guitar
- Ron Oates – Keyboards
- Joe Osborn – Bass
- Doug Renaud – Drums
- Chip Young – Acoustic guitar
- Reggie Young – Electric guitar

Technical personnel

- Charlie Black – Producer
- Febrig – Photography
- Alan Moore – Arrangement
- Farrell Morris – Percussion
- Steve Moser – Engineer
- Lee Stoller – Manager

== Release history ==
Region	Date	Format	Label	Ref.
United States	February 1978	Vinyl	LS Records	
