= Penny Arcade (disambiguation) =

Penny Arcade is an American webcomic focused on video games and video game culture.

Penny Arcade or penny arcade may also refer to:

== Music ==
- "Penny Arcade", a 1967 single by The Cyrkle
- "Penny Arcade", a song by Roy Orbison
- Penny Arcade (album), a 1973 jazz album by Joe Farrell
- "Penny Arcade" (song), a 1978 song by Cristy Lane

== Other uses ==
- Penny arcade, or amusement arcade, venue containing games
- Penny Arcade, a 1929 play led by American actor and dancer James Cagney
- Penny Arcade, an early video game by Bill Budge, mimicking Pong
- Penny Arcade (performer) (born 1950), stage name of performance artist and playwright Susanna Ventura
