= Love to Love You (Cristy Lane song) =

Single by Cristy Lane

from the album I Have a Dream
- B-side: "Everything I Own"
- Released: March 1981
- Recorded: September 1980
- Studio: LSI Studio
- Genre: Country; country pop
- Length: 3:20
- Label: Liberty
- Songwriter: David Heavener
- Producers: Jerry Gillespie; Don Grierson; Lee Stoller

Cristy Lane singles chronology
| "I Have a Dream" (1980) | "Love to Love You" (1981) | "Cheatin' Is Still on My Mind" (1981) |

"Love to Love You" is a song written by David Heavener that was originally recorded by American Christian and country singer Cristy Lane. In 1981, it was released as a single on Liberty Records and became a top 30 charting hit on the North American country charts. "Love to Love You" was released on Lane's corresponding album titled I Have a Dream.

== Background, recording and chart performance ==
By 1980, Cristy Lane had reached commercial success in the country music field with several top ten hits and the number one single "One Day at a Time". Lane recorded several singles in the years that followed for Liberty Records, including "Love to Love You". The song was composed by David Heavener. She recorded the track at LSI Studios, located in Nashville, Tennessee. Taking place in September 1980, the session was produced by Jerry Gillespie, along with assistance from Don Grierson and Lane's husband (and manager) Lee Stoller.

"Love to Love You" was first released on Lane's sixth studio album titled I Have a Dream. The project was issued in February 1981 on Liberty Records. In March 1981, "Love to Love You" was issued as the album's second single, also on the Liberty label. It was Lane's second single release with Liberty. The song became her first single since 1977 to miss the top 20 on the Billboard Hot Country Songs chart, peaking at number 21 in 1981. The song also climbed to number 44 on the Canadian RPM Country Songs chart.

== Track listing ==
7" vinyl single

- "Love to Love You" – 3:20
- "Everything I Own" – 2:59

== Charts ==
| Chart (1981) | Peak position |
|---|---|
| Canada Country Songs (RPM) | 44 |
| US Hot Country Singles (Billboard) | 21 |
