= Spelling on the Stone =

1988 song about Elvis Presley

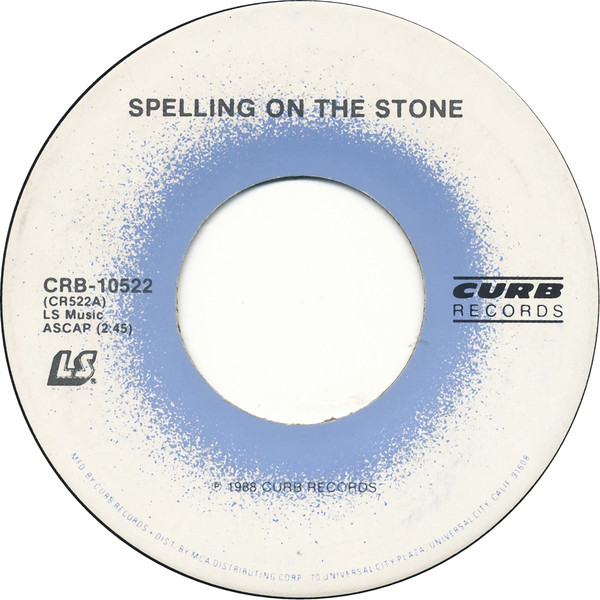
- Single label

Single

from the album Spelling on the Stone
- Released: December 1988
- Genre: Country
- Length: 2:48
- Label: LS/Curb
- Songwriters: Tony Crowe; Lee Stoller; Jimmy Young
- Producer: Lee Stoller

"Spelling on the Stone" is a 1988 song about American musician Elvis Presley, recorded by an uncredited artist impersonating him and released in response to sightings of him following his death. Since its release, the song has been attributed to Dan Willis by some sources.

== History ==
Following the death of Elvis Presley in 1977, a popular rumor in the music industry was that he had faked his death. In the years following his death, there were many purported sightings of him, and in late 1988 record label LS Records released "Spelling on the Stone" to capitalize on the popularity of the phenomenon. According to LS Records owner Lee Stoller, who produced the song, his daughter Tammy received the recording in August 1988 from an anonymous man who arrived at the label's offices in a limousine. After obtaining distribution rights from Curb Records, LS Records released the song on radio by the end of 1988, with the single's release not crediting an artist.

The song's title refers to the fact that Presley's middle name is written as "Aaron" on his tombstone where other sources have "Aron". In reality, Presley used both spellings interchangeably, including "Aaron" on his divorce certificate in his own handwriting. But the supposed "misspelling" of "Aaron" on the tombstone was often held up by conspiracy theorists at the time as supposed proof that Presley was sending a message to real fans that it was not really him in the grave. The song features an uncredited vocalist with a delivery similar to Presley's; it tells a first-person narrative, purportedly from his perspective, to suggest that he had faked his death.

According to an article in The Jersey Journal, when the song was played on WYNY (now WKTU), then a country music radio station in New York City, listeners called the station to report sightings of Elvis. The station's program director thought that the recording was not by Presley, but rather could be by Terry Stafford or Ronnie McDowell. The song was also popular on radio station WNOE-FM in New Orleans, Louisiana; according to its program director, the single was delivered to the station by an anonymous person in a pink Cadillac, and he received 47 calls from listeners after it was first played. Although he did not believe that the recording was by Presley, he chose to play it because of reception from listeners. However, not all reception to the song was positive. An article published by The Canadian Press stated that radio station WCVG in Cincinnati, Ohio, which had been airing an "all-Elvis" format, refused to play the song because its program directors thought it was "definitely a hoax". Presley's ex-wife, Priscilla Presley, denied that the recording was of him, as she thought that he would not be "cruel enough to stage his death". Likewise, a media coordinator for Graceland, Presley's estate, called the song a "very cruel hoax". John Davis, then a professor of music theory at Stevens Institute of Technology in Hoboken, New Jersey, did not believe that the recording was of Presley because he thought that the vocal delivery had "too much vibrato" and "approaches a caricature of Elvis."

=== Impact and authorship ===
The airplay received by the single caused it to enter the Billboard Hot Country Songs charts, where it charted for four weeks between December 1988 and January 1989 with a peak of number 82. Following the release of the single, LS Records issued a full album also titled Spelling on the Stone, featuring various songs themed around Presley and not crediting the artist.

In the book Elvis Music FAQ, author Mike Eder considered the track "an interesting artifact of the 'Elvis is alive' mania that existed in the late eighties." He also stated that the vocalist on the track had been identified as Dan Willis, a musician who had recorded on LS Records. In comparison, chart historian Joel Whitburn stated that the vocals were "reportedly" those of Willis. Similarly, Ron Sylvester of The Springfield News-Leader, after hearing Willis sing at a Branson, Missouri, theater owned by Cristy Lane in 1992, stated that "if you hear Willis sing, you might draw a conclusion as to the identity of the mysterious Elvis-sounding voice on that record."
