= Little by Little (musical) =

Little by Little: A Musical About Friendship, Hormones ...and Popcorn is a 1999 off-Broadway musical produced by The York Theater Company. The book was written by Annette Jolles and Ellen Greenfield, the music by Brad Ross with lyrics by Ellen Greenfield and Hal Hackady. The cast recording was released on the Varèse Sarabande label. The show is licensed by Samuel French.
