= Penny Arcade (song) =

Single by Cristy Lane

from the album Cristy Lane Is the Name
- B-side: "Somebody's Baby"
- Released: June 1978
- Recorded: June 1977
- Studio: LSI Studio
- Genre: Country; country pop
- Length: 2:25
- Label: LS
- Songwriter: Boudleaux Bryant Felice Bryant
- Producer: Charlie Black

Cristy Lane singles chronology
"I'm Gonna Love You Anyway" (1978)	"Penny Arcade" (1978)	"I Just Can't Stay Married to You" (1978)

"Penny Arcade" is a song written by Boudleaux Bryant & Felice Bryant that was originally recorded by Cristy Lane. It was released as a single in 1978 via LS Records and became a top ten country hit. It was also released on the studio album titled Cristy Lane Is the Name.

== Background and recording ==
Cristy Lane had begun to have commercial country music success after her husband formed his own label named LS Records. In 1977, she had her first major hit with the single "Let Me Down Easy". Following the song's success, Lane would have several more country hits between 1977 and 1978. "Penny Arcade" was composed by Felice and Boudleaux Bryant. It was recorded by Lane in June 1977 at the LSI Studio located in Nashville, Tennessee. The song was produced by Charlie Black.

== Release and chart performance ==
"Penny Arcade" was released first on Lane's second studio album titled Cristy Lane Is the Name. The album featured her 1977 hit "Let Me Down Easy", along with 11 additional tracks. "Penny Arcade" was spawned in June 1978 via LS Records as the album's seventh and final single release. It was backed by the B-side titled "Somebody's Baby". The song spent multiple weeks on the Billboard Hot Country Songs chart, peaking at number seven. The tune became Lane's third top ten hit in her country recording career. The song also climbed to number four on the RPM Country Singles chart in Canada. It was her first top ten hit on the chart after charting twice in 1977.

== Track listing ==
7" vinyl single

- "Penny Arcade" – 2:35
- "Somebody's Baby" – 2:58

== Charts ==
Chart (1978)	Peak position
Canada Country Songs (RPM)	4
US Hot Country Singles (Billboard)	7
