= Hal Hackady =

American dramatist (1922–2015)

- Born: Harold Clayton MacHackady; February 10, 1922; Middletown, Connecticut
- Died: October 12, 2015 (aged 93); The Bronx, New York
- Education: Wesleyan University
- Occupations: Lyricist; librettist; screenwriter

Harold Clayton MacHackady (February 10, 1922 – October 12, 2015), best known as Hal Hackady, and sometimes credited as Hal Hackaday, was an American lyricist, librettist and screenwriter.

== Early life ==
He was born in Middletown, Connecticut in 1922. He studied at Wesleyan University, before starting work in New York City in the 1950s.

== Career ==
He began his career writing teleplays for early anthology series General Electric Theater and Alfred Hitchcock Presents. He graduated to feature films as the screenwriter of B-movies capitalizing on the rock and roll craze, including Let's Rock, Senior Prom (both with music by Don Gohman), and Hey, Let's Twist, which earned him a Writers Guild of America nomination for Best Written Musical.

Hackady's theatrical career began with the 1955 Broadway revue Almost Crazy starring Kay Medford, for which he wrote sketches and lyrics. Additional Broadway credits include Minnie's Boys (1970), Ambassador (London, 1971. Broadway, 1972), Goodtime Charley (1975), and Teddy & Alice (1987). He also wrote lyrics for Divorce, of course! (1987) with Angela Paton and Robert Goldsby writing the book, and Lee Pockriss writing the music, based on the French play Divorçons by Victorien Sardou and Émile de Najac.

As a young actor in New York, Hackady befriended another novice, James Dean, who later became a Hollywood legend. Hackady told American Legends website: "I saw East of Eden when it was released. I was amazed. I recalled him as being just like the boy he was playing. He had that quality few actors have: to be who you are and not seem to be acting."

Hackady wrote the lyrics for Snoopy!!! The Musical in 1975, a sequel to You're A Good Man, Charlie Brown. It premiered at the Little Fox Theatre in San Francisco, but it was not until 1982 that it was staged in New York City, at the off-Broadway Lamb's Theatre, with a cast that included David Garrison, Vicki Lewis, and Lorna Luft. It was then mounted in the West End at the Duchess Theatre, where it enjoyed a successful run. Hackady was also represented off-Broadway with a musical adaptation of The Hunchback of Notre-Dame (1993) and the revue Little by Little (1999). Alias Jimmy Valentine and Empty Pleasures have received regional theatre stagings.

In addition, he wrote the lyrics for the 1984 London musical Blockheads, based on the lives of Stan Laurel and Oliver Hardy.

Hackady wrote the lyrics for Eddie Fisher's 1956 hit "Without You". With co-writer Charles Naylor, he wrote the sentimental ballad "Shake Me I Rattle (Squeeze Me I Cry)", originally recorded by the Lennon Sisters in 1957; it became a national chart record for Marion Worth in 1962-63, and returned as a country music hit for Cristy Lane in 1977-78. It has been recorded as a Christmas song. Hackady also wrote the lyrics for the song "Kites", composed by Lee Pockriss, which was first recorded by the Rooftop Singers and became a top ten hit in Britain in 1967 for Simon Dupree and the Big Sound. Hackady and Pockriss also co-wrote a song called "The Key" that Billy Thornhill recorded for Wand Records in 1968.

New York Mets fans are familiar with Hackady's lyrics for "Let's Go, Mets," the team's theme song that was commissioned by advertising executive Jerry Della Femina in 1986. The recording earned a gold record and its companion video was a best-seller.

== Death ==
He died in the Bronx, New York City, on October 12, 2015, aged 93.
