= Cristy Lane Salutes G.I.'s of Viet Nam =

Studio album by Cristy Lane
- Released: 1969
- Genre: Country; patriotic
- Label: Lane
- Producer: Tommy Allsup; Lee Stoller

Cristy Lane chronology
Cristy Lane Salutes G.I.'s of Viet Nam (1969)	Cristy Lane Is the Name (1978)

Singles from Cristy Lane Salutes G.I.'s of Viet Nam
- 1. "Promise Me Anything" Released: 1969; 2. "I Am the Woman" Released: 1970

Cristy Lane Salutes G.I.'s of Viet Nam is a studio album by American country and Christian artist Cristy Lane. It was released in 1969 via Lane Records and contained a total of 13 tracks. The album was Lane's debut studio album in her recording career and featured songs Lane performed during concert tour entertaining troops during the Vietnam War.

== Background and content ==
Cristy Lane began a recording career in the mid 1960s and attempted to break into the country music field, but had little success in Nashville, Tennessee. Instead, Lane's husband (and manager) Lee Stoller organized a 120-show concert tour for American troops fighting during the Vietnam War. The tour took place in 1969. The three-month engagement entertained more than 300,000 servicemen as she toured throughout Vietnam. Upon returning, Lane recorded tracks she performed during the tour which were to be released on her debut album. The project was co-produced by Stoller and musician Tommy Allsup. A total of 13 songs were recorded for the disc.

== Release and reception ==
A mixture of covers and new recordings were included on the project. Among its covers was "Love of the Common People", Patsy Cline's "I Fall to Pieces" and Jeannie C. Riley's "Harper Valley PTA". Among its new recordings was "I Am the Woman" and "Promise Me Anything". Cristy Lane Salutes G.I.'s of Vietnam was released in 1969 via Lane Records. It was her debut studio album in her career was issued as a vinyl LP on Lane Records. The album received a favorable response by authors Mary Bufwack and Robert K. Oermann of the book Finding Her Voice: The History of Women in Country Music, who called it an album that "mined patriotism". The album included two songs that would later be issued as singles. "Promise Me Anything" would later be released in 1969. Its final single release was "I Am the Woman," which would be issued in 1970.

== Track listing ==
Side one
No.	Title	Writer(s)	Length
1.	"Take a Look Around You"	Smiths	2:32
2.	"Cross Over the Bridge"	Bennie Benjamin; George David Weiss	2:27
3.	"Harper Valley PTA"	Tom T. Hall	3:20
4.	"Don't Make Fun"	Cristy Lane	2:10
5.	"Cotton Fields"	Hud Leadbetter	2:04
6.	"Love of the Common People"	John Hurley and Ronnie Wilkins	2:47

Side two
No.	Title	Writer(s)	Length
1.	"I Am the Woman"	Jerry Foster	2:37
2.	"I'm Saving My Kisses"	N/A	2:19
3.	"I Fall to Pieces"	Hank Cochran; Harlan Howard	2:20
4.	"Sing Me One More Song"	N/A	2:41
5.	"Promise Me Anything"	Jimmy Peppers	2:05
6.	"One Slightly Used Wedding Band"	Ray King; Rose Lee	2:39
7.	"Stand by Your Man"	Billy Sherrill; Tammy Wynette	2:30

== Release history ==
Region	Date	Format	Label	Ref.
United States	1969	Vinyl	Lane Records	
