= Shake Me I Rattle (Squeeze Me I Cry) =

Single by The Lennon Sisters

from the album Let's Get Acquainted
- B-side: "Pocahontas"
- Released: August 1957
- Genre: Pop
- Length: 2:33
- Label: Brunswick
- Songwriters: Hal Hackady; Charles Naylor
- Producer: Lawrence Welk

The Lennon Sisters singles chronology
| "White Silver Sands" (1957) | "Shake Me I Rattle (Squeeze Me I Cry)" (1957) | "Merry, Merry Christmas" (1957) |

"Shake Me I Rattle (Squeeze Me I Cry)" is a song written by Hal Hackady and Charles Naylor. It was originally recorded by The Lennon Sisters in 1957, but did not become commercially successful until a 1962 release by Marion Worth. It was later recorded in 1977 by Cristy Lane, who also had a major hit with the song.

== The Lennon Sisters version ==
"Shake Me I Rattle" was originally recorded by American traditional pop vocal group The Lennon Sisters. The song was first composed by Hal Hackady and Charles Naylor. The sister trio recorded the track in 1957 in sessions produced by Lawrence Welk. In August 1957, "Shake Me I Rattle" was released as a single via Brunswick Records, backed by "Pocahontas" on the B-side. The song was later included on their 1957 album titled Let's Get Acquainted. "Shake Me I Rattle" was reviewed favorably by Billboard magazine in September 1957. "Girls sing out sweetly on folksy ditty with strong kiddie appeal about a tot and her toy," they wrote.

=== Track listing ===
7" vinyl single

- "Shake Me I Rattle (Squeeze Me I Cry)" – 2:33
- "Pocahontas" – 2:06

== Marion Worth version ==
"Shake Me I Rattle (Squeeze Me I Cry)"

Single by Marion Worth
- B-side: "Tennessee Teardrops"
- Released: November 1962
- Recorded: October 1962
- Studio: Columbia Recording Studio
- Genre: Country; Nashville Sound
- Length: 2:58
- Label: Columbia
- Songwriters: Hal Hackady; Charles Naylor
- Producers: Frank Jones; Don Law

Marion Worth singles chronology
| "It's So Funny I Could Cry" (1962) | "Shake Me I Rattle (Squeeze Me I Cry)" (1962) | "Crazy Arms" (1963) |

"Shake Me I Rattle (Squeeze Me I Cry)" was notably recorded by American country music singer Marion Worth in 1962. After signing with Columbia Records, Worth had several major hits on the American country charts in the early 1960s. Worth recorded "Shake Me I Rattle" in October 1962 at the Columbia Recording Studio, located in Nashville, Tennessee. During the same session, she cut two more sides alongside producers Don Law and Frank Jones. Worth's version was released as a single on the Columbia label in November 1962.

Worth's version of the song became the first to be commercially successful. It spent multiple weeks on the Billboard Hot Country Songs chart, peaking at number 14 on the chart in 1963. The song became Worth's fifth charting single in her music career. It was also her first (and only) single to reach the Billboard Hot 100, peaking at number 42 around the same time.

=== Track listing ===
7" vinyl single

- "Shake Me I Rattle (Squeeze Me I Cry)" – 2:58
- "Tennessee Teardrops"

7" vinyl single (promotional version)

- "Shake Me I Rattle (Squeeze Me I Cry)" – 2:58
- "My Dolley Has a Pain in Her Sawdust" – 2:31

=== Charts ===
| Chart (1962–63) | Peak position |
|---|---|
| US Hot 100 (Billboard) | 42 |
| US Hot Country Singles (Billboard) | 14 |

== Cristy Lane version ==
"Shake Me I Rattle"

Single by Cristy Lane

from the album Cristy Lane Is the Name
- B-side: "Pretty Paper"
- Released: November 1977
- Recorded: September 1977
- Studio: LSI Studio
- Genre: Country; country pop
- Length: 2:58
- Label: LS
- Songwriters: Hal Hackady; Charles Naylor
- Producer: Charlie Black

Cristy Lane singles chronology
| "Let Me Down Easy" (1977) | "Shake Me I Rattle" (1977) | "I'm Gonna Love You Anyway" (1978) |

Under the title "Shake Me I Rattle," American Christian and country singer Cristy Lane notably recorded the song in 1977. She had recently attained commercial success in the country field under her husband's record label with the top ten hit "Let Me Down Easy". Lane recorded "Shake Me I Rattle" shortly after her previous hit. The session took place in September 1977 at LSI Studio, located in Nashville, Tennessee. One additional track was cut during the same session under the production of Charlie Black. The single was released via LS Records in November 1977, backed by the song "Pretty Paper".

"Shake Me I Rattle" spent multiple weeks on the Billboard Hot Country Songs chart between late 1977 and early 1978 before peaking at number 16. It became Lane's second major hit in her career. In Canada, the single also reached the RPM Country Singles chart, where it peaked at number 28. In February 1978, Lane's version was released in second studio album titled Cristy Lane Is the Name.

=== Track listing ===
7" vinyl single

- "Shake Me I Rattle (Squeeze Me I Cry)" – 2:59
- "Pretty Paper" – 2:29

=== Charts ===
| Chart (1977–78) | Peak position |
|---|---|
| Canada Country Songs (RPM) | 28 |
| US Hot Country Singles (Billboard) | 16 |
