= Footprints (poem) =

Allegorical religious poem

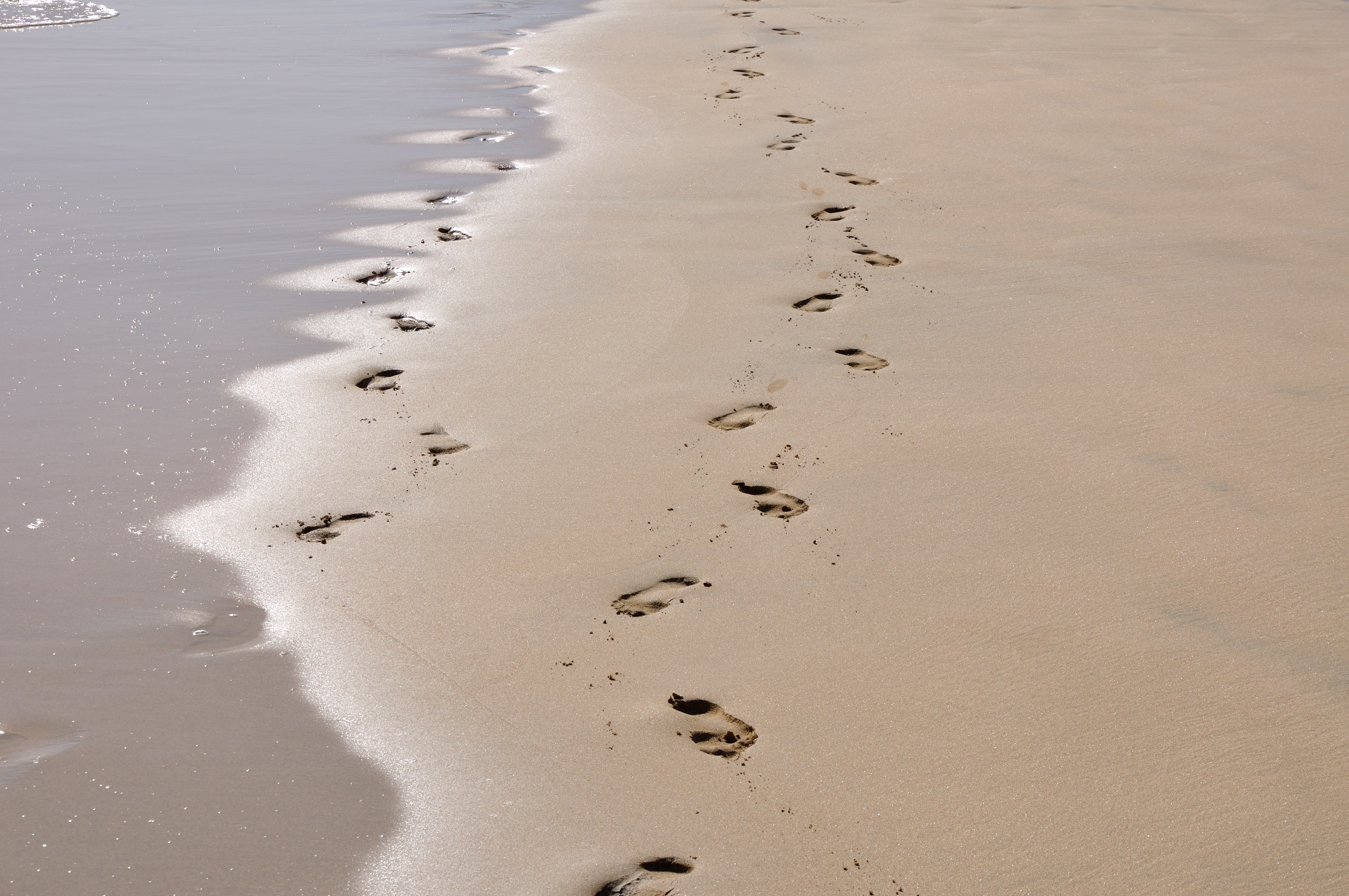
Footprints in the sand (2012; Fuerteventura, Canary Islands, Spain).

"Footprints", also known as "Footprints in the Sand", is a popular modern allegorical Christian poem. It describes a person who sees two pairs of footprints in the sand, one of which belonged to God, and another to themselves. At some points, the two pairs of footprints dwindle to one; it is explained that this is where God carried the protagonist.

== Content ==
This popular text is based in Christian beliefs and describes an experience in which a person is walking on a beach with God. They leave two sets of footprints in the sand. The tracks represent stages of the speaker's life. The two trails dwindle to one, especially at the lowest and most hopeless moments of the person's life. When the narrator questions God, believing that the Lord must have abandoned his love during those times, God gives the explanation: "During your times of trial and suffering, when you see only one set of footprints, it was then that I carried you."

== Authorship and origin ==
The authorship of the poem is disputed, with a number of people claiming to have written it. In 2008, Rachel Aviv, in a Poetry Foundation article, discusses the claims of Burrell Webb, Mary Stevenson, Margaret Fishback Powers, and Carolyn Joyce Carty. Later that year, The Washington Post, covering a lawsuit between the claims of Stevenson, Powers, and Carty, said that "At least a dozen people" had claimed credit for the poem.

The three authors who have most strenuously promoted their authorship are Margaret Powers (née Fishback), Carolyn Carty, and Mary Stevenson. Powers says she wrote the poem on Canadian Thanksgiving weekend, in mid-October 1964. Powers is among the contenders who have resorted to litigation in hopes of establishing a claim. She is occasionally confused with American writer Margaret Fishback. Powers published an autobiography in 1993.

Carolyn Carty also claims to have written the poem in 1963 when she was six years old, based on an earlier work by her great-great aunt, a Sunday school teacher. She is known to be a hostile contender of the "Footprints" poem and declines to be interviewed about it, although she writes letters to those who write about the poem online. A collection of poetry by Carty with a claim to authorship of "Footprints" was published in 2004.

Mary Stevenson is also a purported author of the poem circa 1936. A Stevenson biography was published in 1995, written by Gail Brewer-Giorgio, who had previously become famous for perpetuating the conspiracy theory that Elvis Presley might still be alive.

=== Popular use of phrase ===
Before its appearance in the 1970s, the phrase "footprints in the sand" occurred in other works. The most dominant usage in prose is in the context of fictional or nonfiction adventure or mystery stories or articles. Prominent fiction includes the Daniel Defoe novel Robinson Crusoe (1719) and the Nathaniel Hawthorne short story "Foot-prints on the Sea-shore" (1838), originally published in the Democratic Review. Hawthorne published the story again in Twice-Told Tales, and it has been reprinted many times since. A line in the story reads: "Thus, by tracking our foot-prints in the sand, we track our own nature in its wayward course, and steal a glance upon it, when it never dreams of being so observed. Such glances always make us wiser." Non-fiction includes the 1926 post-kidnapping discovery of Aimee Semple McPherson in the northern Mexican desert.

In the two centuries before 1980, when "Footprints" entered popular American culture, many books, articles, and sermons appeared with "Footprints in the Sand" as a title. Some of them concerned the lives of Christian missionaries. Footprints and Living Songs (1883) is a biography of hymn-writer Frances Ridley Havergal. The poem "A Psalm of Life" (1839) by Henry Wadsworth Longfellow contained the lines:

Lives of great men all remind us
We can make our lives sublime,
And, departing, leave behind us
Footprints on the sands of time.

Within a decade, the last phrase of the poem was being used in public discourse without attribution, apparently on the assumption that any literate reader would know its origin. In some usages, the clause "of time" disappeared; later, the word "on" seems to have become "in". "The Object of a Life" (1876) by George Whyte-Melville includes the lines:

To tell of the great example, the Man of compassion and woe;
Of footprints left behind Him, in the earthly path He trod,
And how the lowest may find Him, who straitly walk with God

This poem was published in the widely read (and plagiarized) Temple Bar. The lines here are strikingly similar in many respects to those seen in contemporaneous hymn lyrics and later poetry.

=== Biblical background ===
Deuteronomy 1:31 presents the concept of "God bearing you". The 1609 Douay-Rheims Bible Old Testament translation from Latin into English uses the wording: "And in the wilderness (as thou hast seen) the Lord thy God hath carried thee, as a man is wont to carry his little son, all the way that you have come, until you came to this place."

In 1971, the New American Standard Bible used the language "and in the wilderness where you saw how the LORD your God carried you". Nearly identical wording is used in other late-twentieth-century translations, including the New International Version of 1978.

=== Possible 19th century origins ===
May Riley Smith's poem "If", published without attribution in the Indianapolis Journal in 1869, includes a stanza that describes God's footprints in the sand next to a boy's:

If I could know those little feet were shod in sandals wrought of light in better lands,
And that the foot-prints of a tender God ran side by side with his, in golden sands,
I could bow cheerfully, and kiss the rod, since Benny was in wiser, safer hands.

June Hadden Hobbs suggested that the origin of the modern "Footprints" is in the Mary B. C. Slade hymn "Footsteps of Jesus" (1871) as "almost surely the source of the notion that Jesus's footprints have narrative significance that influences the way believers conduct their life stories...it allows Jesus and a believer to inhabit the same space at the same time...Jesus travels the path of the believer, instead of the other way around."

A similar argument could be made for Footprints of Jesus by L. B. Thorpe as published in The International Lesson Hymnal (1878).

Aviv suggests that the source of the modern "Footprints" allegory is the opening paragraph of the Charles Haddon Spurgeon sermon "The Education of the Sons of God" (1880). He wrote:

And did you ever walk out upon that lonely desert island upon which you were wrecked, and say, "I am alone, — alone, — alone, — nobody was ever here before me"? And did you suddenly pull up short as you noticed, in the sand, the footprints of a man? I remember right well passing through that experience; and when I looked, lo! it was not merely the footprints of a man that I saw, but I thought I knew whose feet had left those imprints; they were the marks of One who had been crucified, for there was the print of the nails. So I thought to myself, "If he has been here, it is a desert island no longer."

In 1883, an American encyclopedia of hymns by female writers included Jetty Vogel, an English poet. Vogel's "At the Portal" follows someone looking at their footprints as they deviate from the proper path. Vogel's hymn has an angel's footsteps but lacks the "I carried you" of the modern "Footprints".

In 1892, the Evening Star ran a short story "Footprints in the Sand", written by Flora Haines Loughead for the Star. The work uses a metaphor for Christ, of a father following footprints in the sand of another's child headed for danger, as he wonders, "Why was it that there was nowhere any sign of a larger footprint to guide the little babyish feet?"

=== Possible 20th century origins ===
In 1910, Methodist pastor and evangelist Luther B. Bridgers composed a hymn titled "He Keeps Me Singing." The fourth verse contains the following line: "though sometimes the path seems rough and steep, see His footprints all the way." The image seems to be of someone climbing a mountain or other rough terrain but seeing the footprints of another previous traveler (representing Christ) and using them as a guide.

In 1918, the Mormon publication The Children's Friend re-published the Loughead piece (credited, but misspelled "Laughead"), ensuring a wider distribution in the western states.

Chicago area poet Lucille Veneklasen frequently submitted poems to the Chicago Tribune in the 1940s and 1950s; one entitled "Footprints" was published in the Tribune in late 1958:

I walked the road to sorrow—a road so dark with care, so lonely, I was certain that no one else was there.
But suddenly around me were beams of light, stretched wide; and then I saw that someone was walking by my side.
And when I turned to notice this road which I had trod, I saw two sets of footprints—My own... and those of God.

Veneklasen's poem appeared occasionally in newspaper obituaries, commonly lacking attribution, and often with the name of the deceased substituted for "I".

In 1963 and 1964, the Aiken Standard and Review in South Carolina ran a poem by frequent contributor M. L. Sullivan entitled "Footprints". This was a bit of romantic verse that moves from sadness at "lone footprints in the sand" to close with "our footprints in the sand".

== Early documentable history ==
The earliest known formally dated publications of any variants of the poem are from 1978, with three different descriptions of the person and also the setting. The first to appear, in July 1978, in a small Iowa town newspaper, is a very concise (six-sentence) version featuring an "elderly man" and "rocky roads". The piece has no attribution, and this version does not seem to have appeared in any other publication:

An elderly man, who had lived his life and left this world to go and meet his Maker asked the Lord a question.
"As I'm looking down on the paths I've trod, I see two sets of footprints on the easy paths.
But down the rocky roads I see only one set of footprints.
"Tell me, Lord, why did you let me go down all those hard paths alone?"
The Lord smiled and simply replied, "Oh, my son, you've got that all wrong!
I carried you over those hard paths."

The second and most complete early appearance was in a September 1978 issue of Evangel, a semi-monthly Church of God publication. This version is similar to the "Carty" version, but is credited to "Author Unknown—(Submitted by Billy Walker)". A third version appeared in October 1978, in two California papers, first in Oakland and twelve days later in Shafter, with a "young woman" and a "sandy pathway" in a "desert wilderness". This version does not appear to have re-emerged later:

[A] young woman who was going through hard times ... began to pray to God for help.
... [S]uddenly in her mind's eye she saw two sets of footprints side by side on a sandy pathway.
Immediately her spirits lifted because she interpreted this to mean that God was with her and was walking beside her.
Then the picture changed. She now saw the footprints located in a vast desert wilderness, and instead of two sets of footprints, there was only one.
Why was God no longer beside her? As despair settled back over her, she began to cry.
Then the inner voice of God softly spoke and said, "I have not left you. The one set of footprints is mine.
You see, I am carrying you through the wilderness."

In 1979, additional appearances occurred: two in small Louisiana and Mississippi newspapers, one in a Catholic journal, two in widely syndicated newspapers columns, one on a nationwide radio program and reprinted by two small papers, and one in a prominent evangelist's biography. In January 1979, the Opelousas, Louisiana, Daily World published a near exact Carty version, but with a "My dear child" mutation at the end, and no attribution.

In March, the Winona Times presented a Powers-like version with "a certain elderly man ... walking along a sea shore" where "Out of the waves shot rays of light, mystic and wonderful that played across the sky illuminating scenes from his life". He was: "...sorely troubled and his life had been at its saddest and lowest ebb."

The March 1979 issue of Liguorian, a monthly publication of the Catholic Congregation of the Most Holy Redeemer, published a complete, nearly unmodified first-person version following Carty, but attributed to "Author Unknown".

Christian televangelist and columnist Robert Schuller noted in his column that a reader had sent him a story; it is unclear whether the version presented in the column—which casts a "pilgrim" as the human character—was used verbatim or was rewritten by Schuller: this particular version has not been re-published after the column's original nationwide publication during March–August 1979:

[A] pilgrim arrived in heaven and God said to him, "Would you like to see where you've come from?"
When the pilgrim responded that he would, God unfolded the story of his whole life and he saw footprints from the cradle to the grave.
Only there were not only the footprints of the pilgrim, but another set of prints alongside.
The pilgrim said, "I see my footprints, but whose are those?"
And the Lord said, "Those are My footprints. I was with you all the time."
Then they came to a dark, discouraging valley and the pilgrim said, "I see only one set of footprints through that valley.
I was so discouraged. You were not there with me. It was just as I thought–I was so all alone!"
Then the Lord said, "Oh, but I was there. I was with you the whole time.
You see, those are MY footprints. I carried you all through that valley."

In April 1979, the Havre Daily News in Montana published a variant of the Carty version told in first person with slightly different punctuation and a "never, never" alteration to match the "precious, precious child" of the previous sentence. The author of the local weekly column noted that it had been supplied by a friend who had "first heard [it] when Paul Harvey quoted it on his radio program". It is unknown whether the listener had copied it down from memory or received a written version from Mr. Harvey or elsewhere. No recordings or transcriptions of Mr. Harvey's daily radio news and commentary broadcasts are known to have survived. A verbatim copy of the Havre instance ran in a small, inmate-produced newsletter published by the Napa State Hospital, in July 1979.

Advice columnist Ann Landers published an exact copy of the Stevenson version in July 1979. The column indicates that the correspondent who provided the work claims to have carried a tattered copy around "for years" with no further explanation of its publication source. She printed the piece again in late February 1982 in response to reader demand, noting that it had also appeared in Reader's Digest. The 1982 republication added a novel phrase: "I would never desert you."

Christian televangelist Jerry Falwell's biography, Jerry Falwell: Aflame for God (1979), opens a chapter with an expanded "a man dreamed" version.

Humorist and columnist Erma Bombeck published a condensed version of Stevenson's variant in July 1980.

During the 1980 United States presidential campaign, Ronald Reagan used a variant of "Footprints", with himself as the human, as the closing lines in an August speech to evangelical leaders in Dallas, Texas. President Reagan used "Footprints" again in a speech at the annual National Prayer Breakfast on 5 February 1981. These versions appear to be Stevenson paraphrases.

Advice columnist "Dear Abby" ran a Carty version attributed to "Author Unknown" in late 1981.

== Influence ==
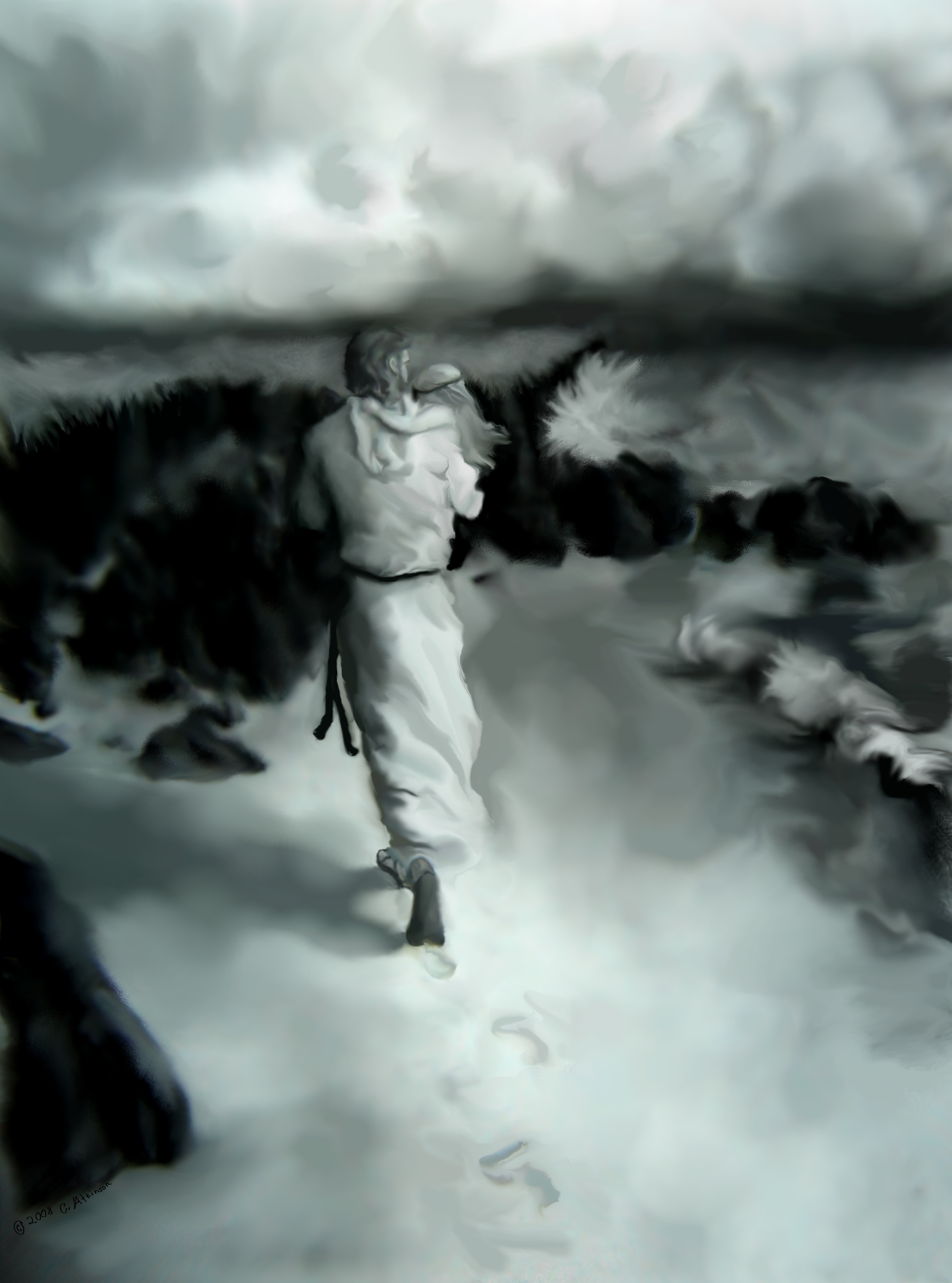
An artistic rendering of the scene the poetry inspires.

In 1983, Cristy Lane released a country gospel song based on the poem called "Footprints in the Sand". The song peaked at No. 64 on the Billboard Country chart and No. 30 on the U.S. Christian chart.

Per Magnusson, David Kreuger, Richard Page, and Simon Cowell wrote a song based on the poem, called "Footprints in the Sand", which was recorded by Leona Lewis. It appears on Lewis's debut album Spirit. "Footprints in the Sand" became the official theme of the 2008 version of biennial charity programme Sport Relief, by the BBC.

Another song inspired by the poem called "Footprints" was recorded by Dancehall/Reggae group T.O.K.

== See also ==
- Third Man factor
- Parable of the drowning man, another story about God and his relationship with humanity often retold among modern Christians

== Bibliography ==
- Aviv, Rachel (2007). "Enter Sandman: Who wrote "Footprints"?". Poetry Foundation. Archived from the original on 4 December 2007.
