= Marion Worth =

American singer (1930–1999)

- Born: Mary Ann Ward; July 4, 1930
- Origin: Birmingham, Alabama
- Died: December 19, 1999 (aged 69)
- Genres: Country, Pop
- Occupations: Singer, Songwriter
- Instruments: Vocals, Piano, Guitar
- Years active: 1959–1999
- Labels: Cherokee Records; Columbia Records; Decca Records

Marion Worth (born Mary Ann Ward; July 4, 1930 – December 19, 1999) was an American country music singer. She was a popular performer on the Grand Ole Opry in Nashville, Tennessee. She also had several hits in the early 1960s.

== Early life ==
Ward was born in Birmingham, Alabama, during the Great Depression. Her father, a railroad worker, taught her how to play piano. At the age of 10, she won a local talent show contest for five weeks straight. Worth attended the Paul Hayne School, where she began training as a nurse. Worth accepted a job as a bookkeeper for a record company around the time she and her sister won another local talent contest. These events encouraged Worth to pursue a career in the music business.

She made her radio debut on Dallas, Texas station KLIF. She then returned to Birmingham and worked at radio stations WVOK and WAPI, and also appeared on WAPI-TV. She met established singer/songwriter Happy Wilson who became quite impressed with Marion's singing and began recording her.

== Musical career ==
In 1959, Worth had her first hit, called "Are You Willing, Willie," on Cherokee Records. The song peaked in the top 15 of the country music charts. In 1960, her song "That's My Kind of Love" went to the top 5, becoming her biggest hit. Jack Stapp signed the young singer to the Grand Ole Opry's Friday Night Frolic. As a result of her independent record label hits, she was signed to Columbia Records where she was produced by Don Law and Frank Jones. At Columbia, she recorded a single called "I Think I Know". The song was a Top 10 hit for Worth. In 1961, she released another single called "There'll Always Be Sadness". The single was not as successful as her other singles, but it did make the Top 25 that year. For almost two years, Worth was absent from the country charts.

In 1963, Marion returned to the country charts with the song "Shake Me I Rattle (Squeeze Me I Cry)" which reached Country's Top 15 and crossed over to the Pop Music charts, reaching the Top 50. It was also played on Easy Listening stations, and receives some airplay as a Christmas song due to its theme of toys and giving. She followed up well with a cover version of "Crazy Arms," a hit for Ray Price. Her version reached the Country Top 20. That same year, Worth joined the Grand Ole Opry. Her 1964 started with a Top 40 hit called "You Took Him Off My Hands (Now Please Take Him Off My Mind)". Her biggest hit of 1964 was a duet recording with George Morgan called "Slipping Around". The song was a Top 20 hit. She had another recording that year called "The French Song", which was a Top 25 hit.

In 1966, Worth was back on the charts with a top 40 recording called "I Will Not Blow Out the Light". Marion soon parted ways with Columbia Records and signed with Decca Records where she recorded two songs that reached the charts, "A Woman Needs Love" in 1967 and "Mama Sez" in 1968.

== Later years and death ==
Worth's success on the country music charts waned after 1968. Her hobby was to study the history of the world, which she focused a lot of time on after her chart success faded away. However, Worth didn't stop performing. She continued to be an active member of the Grand Ole Opry and she was a popular and in-demand performer for many years in the United States and Canada.

On Sunday, December 19, 1999, Worth died in Nashville, Tennessee at the Tennessee Christian Medical Center from complications of emphysema. She was 69 years old, and was survived by a daughter, Joyce.

== Discography ==
=== Albums ===
Year	Album	US Country	Label
1963	Greatest Hits	—	Columbia
1964	Slippin' Around (with George Morgan)	12	Columbia
1965	Sings Marty Robbins	—	Columbia
1968	A Woman Needs Love	38	Decca

=== Singles ===
Year	Single	Chart Positions		Album
Year	Single	US Country	US	Album
1959	"Are You Willing, Willie"	12	—	singles only
1960	"That's My Kind of Love"	5	—	singles only
1960	"I Think I Know"	7	—	Greatest Hits
1961	"There'll Always Be Sadness"	21	—	Greatest Hits
1963	"Shake Me I Rattle (Squeeze Me I Cry)"	14	42	Greatest Hits
1963	"Crazy Arms"	18	—	singles only
1964	"You Took Him Off My Hands (Now Please Take Him Off My Mind)"	33	—	singles only
1964	"Slipping Around" (with George Morgan)	23	—	Slippin' Around
1964	"The French Song"	25	—	singles only
1965	"I Will Not Blow Out the Light"	32	—	singles only
1967	"A Woman Needs Love"	64	—	A Woman Needs Love
1968	"Mama Sez"	45	—	single only
