= Cristy Lane =

American country music singer (born 1940)

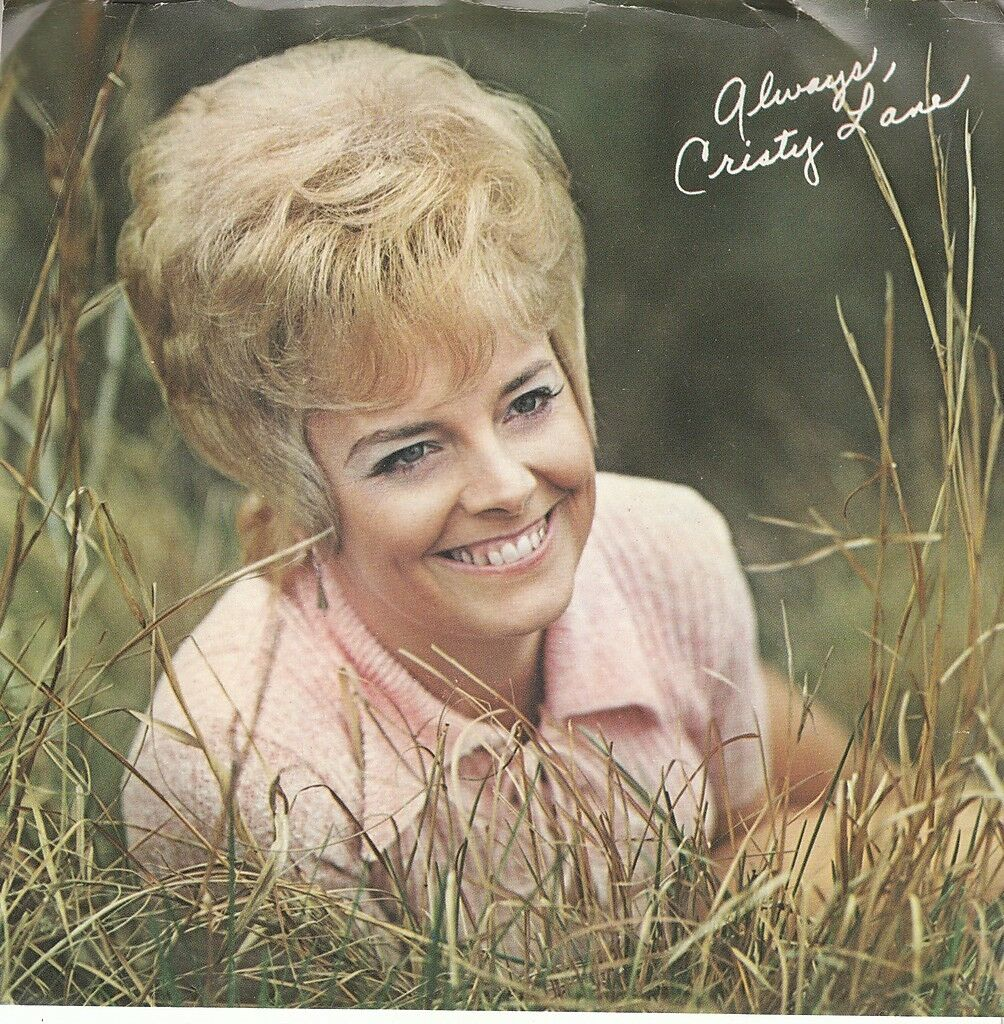
- Lane, c. 1975
- Born: Eleanor Johnston; January 8, 1940 (age 86); Peoria, Illinois, U.S.
- Occupation: Singer
- Years active: 1966–present
- Spouse: Lee Stoller (m. 1959)
- Children: 3
- Musical career
- Genres: Country; Christian
- Instrument: Vocals
- Labels: K-Ark; Spar; Extremely Brave; United Artists; Liberty; LS
- Website: cristylane.com

Cristy Lane (born Eleanor Johnston; January 8, 1940) is an American Christian and country music singer. In the late 1970s and early 1980s, she had a series of hits on the North American country charts with songs like "Let Me Down Easy", "I Just Can't Stay Married to You" and the number one hit "One Day at a Time". The latter recording inspired a book of the same name, which was sold on cable television and brought renewed interest to Lane's career.

Lane was raised in Peoria, Illinois, and married Lee Stoller at age 19. She raised three children while Stoller worked a sales job in the Peoria area. One day, Stoller overheard his wife singing at home and got the idea that she could become a successful country music vocalist. Stoller soon became her full-time manager and by 1966 she released her first single on a small independent record label. Lane recorded for a series of small labels during the decade with no success. In 1969, Lane and Stoller traveled the far east where she performed over 100 shows for American soldiers fighting in the Vietnam War. Traumatized by the experience, Lane considered ending her career but ultimately decided to continue.

The family moved to Nashville, Tennessee, in the early 1970s to restart Lane's country singing career. Facing rejection from every major record company, Stoller decided to form his own label, which he named LS Records. The company began releasing Cristy Lane singles in the mid 1970s. In 1977, she had her first major hit with "Let Me Down Easy". It was followed by a series of top ten hits over the next several years. In 1979, Lane signed with United Artists Records, where she would record "One Day at a Time". The single would become her biggest hit in her career and prompted Lane to record a series of albums tailored to the Christian market in the 1980s. This included LPs such as One Day at a Time (1981) and Footprints in the Sand (1983).

In 1982, Stoller went to prison on federal bribery charges. The criminal conviction halted Lane's career, but when he was released, he published her biography also titled One Day at a Time (1983). Marketing the book on cable television in combination with her record albums, One Day at a Time sold over a million copies. Over the next several decades, Lane's biography and recordings were sold over television commercials, the worldwide web and through other major distributors. In the 1990s, the couple opened a theater in Branson, Missouri, which ran shows for several years.

== Early life ==
Lane was born Eleanor Johnston in Peoria, Illinois, to Andrew and Pansy Johnston, one of 12 children. The Johnston family lived in a two-bedroom home located in the nearby town of East Peoria, Illinois. She was given the nickname, "Ellie", by her father at an early age and was called it throughout her early years. During her childhood, Ellie developed an interest with the family's kitchen radio, which often played soap operas and popular songs of the era. During her school-aged years, she took a specialized course for a speech impediment that she had developed as a young child. Ellie was often bullied in school for her lisp and her small stature. She eventually graduated from East Peoria High School in the late 1950s.

She was introduced to country music by her husband, Lee Stoller, whom she met in her late teens. Her first country music artists of interest were Eddy Arnold, Jim Reeves and Marty Robbins. After marrying, the Stollers moved into an apartment in East Peoria before buying a converted garage in the same area with a 50-dollar per month mortgage. The couple soon had three children by 1964. Now known as Ellie Stoller, she took employment at a printing company in East Peoria, while her husband was employed as a salesman with Pepperidge Farms. In 1965, Stoller overheard his wife singing Patti Page's "Tennessee Waltz" and was impressed by her voice. From then on, it was Stoller's idea that she could become a country music singing star and began encouraging her to perform in front of people.

== Career ==
=== 1966–1972: Career launch and touring overseas ===
A first attempt to launch her singing career began when Lee Stoller arranged for a tape to be made of his wife's vocals. The recording was made in the Stollers' living room, with Ellie standing in front of a microphone taped to a chair. Stoller then arranged for a local nightclub owner to visit and hear Ellie sing. Ellie's husband believed that she had the talent to become a professional performer, but she suffered from shyness. After the nightclub organized Ellie's first public performance, she was reluctant to get up on stage. "What am I doing up here?" she recalled saying to herself. However, once the band started playing the song Paper Roses," she was able to get through the tune. Following her performance, the audience applauded and she performed several more selections that evening.

During this time, Lee changed her name from Ellie Stoller to Cristy Lane, and had her dye her hair. However, the pressures of performing publicly caused continued fear and anxiety for Lane. Stoller had her read several self-help books and see a psychiatrist, who gave her tranquilizers. Nonetheless, the couple continued her singing career. She continued finding more nightclub work, sometimes changing out of her nightgown to perform last-minute dates. She also was given a slot to perform on Chicago's local country music television program titled National Barn Dance. The Stollers also opened a pair of nightclubs in the late 1960s where Lane could perform on a regular basis. The first nightclub titled Cristy's Inc. was bought out by a nursing home company. Their second nightclub, The Flame, opened up shortly afterward.

In 1966, the Stollers took a trip to Nashville where Lane recorded several selections supervised by businessman Cliff Parnum. In her first recording sessions, Lane cut Jeanne Pruett's "Janie Took My Place". She also cut "I'm Saving My Kisses", "Stop Fooling with Me" and "Heart in the Sand". Yet Lane's songs were rejected by every major country record label. Although Stoller met with major-label producers Owen Bradley and Chet Atkins, the companies had no interest in his wife. The independent K-Ark Records took interest and signed Lane to a recording contract. In 1966, K-Ark issued "Janie Took My Place" as her debut single. Stoller paid one thousand dollars to manufacture her record and he promoted 500 single records by himself.

Lane's early material was described by music writer Greg Adams as a style that "pointed towards the country-pop sound with which she would eventually find success. Stoller billed her as "the female Jim Reeves" and the "Sweetest Voice This Side of Heaven". Despite his early efforts, Lane's country career did not yield any commercial success. She recorded several more singles for K-Ark in the mid-1960s and cut material for the Spar and Extremely Brave record labels through 1972. Yet, further material proved unsuccessful.

In 1969, Lane and her husband traveled to Vietnam to perform for the American troops stationed there for the war. The engagement was planned in a span of two weeks and was nearly cancelled due to the hired band backing out last minute. The 120-concert tour took Lane to the front lines of American combat. At times, Lane performed despite hearing bombs and fighter jets less than a mile away. During other performances, Lane had to shelter in place to avoid being killed. In a car headed to Saigon, Lane witnessed the soldier sitting beside her get shot and killed. "Bullets were ripping through his body, their impact jerking him back. He slumped over the gun he had been strapped to. He was dead," Lane's biography book recalled in 1983. Because several shows had to be cancelled, the Stollers lost an estimated twelve thousand dollars during their trip. Following her return to the United States, Lane recorded her first album titled Cristy Lane Salutes G.I.'s of Viet Nam. The project was released in 1969 and was dedicated to the soldiers fighting overseas.

Lane became increasingly unhappy following her return home from Vietnam. She continued regularly performing at "The Flame", but found her schedule too busy and unfulfilling. She was also reliving the experiences of watching warfare day after day. In 1970, Lane overdosed on Valium medication. Following the experience Lane considered the idea of giving up a career in music. However, after contemplating it for several days, she reconsidered. "I’m not going to let every little thing build up inside me. I’ve got to quit carrying everyone else’s problems—especially my own family’s—around on my shoulders. I want to go back to singing," she said. In 1972, the Stollers moved to Nashville, Tennessee in a second attempt to launch Lane's country music career.

=== 1972–1981: Breakthrough in country music and "One Day at a Time" ===
Following their Nashville move, Lee Stoller began learning more about the country music industry to help further Lane's career. He arranged several recording sessions for his wife, paying a reported three thousand dollars per session. He also made regular trips to Nashville where he shopped Lane's material. However, her recordings were rejected by all the major record labels. Ultimately, Stoller decided to form his own record company. To fund the project, he collaborated in a business venture joining law enforcement on fundraising projects. Stoller then established his newly-formed LS Records in a small office located in Madison, Tennessee. He also arranged for a photography business to operate from the office. LS began releasing singles by Lane in 1976, starting with a cover of Melissa Manchester's "Midnight Blue". Her next two singles were Lane's first to make the American country charts: "Tryin' to Forget About You" and "Sweet Deceiver".

In 1977, Lane recorded her next single release titled "Let Me Down Easy". The song was produced by Charlie Black, a Nashville songwriter, who had also been working as an independent producer. For the song's promotion, LS Records made an arrangement for the GRT label to distribute the product. "Let Me Down Easy" became Lane's first major country hit, climbing to number seven on the Billboard Hot Country Singles chart. Lane's commercial success continued with her next three single releases. Between 1977 and 1978 she had top ten hits with "I'm Gonna Love You Anyway" and "Penny Arcade". A cover of Marion Worth's "Shake Me I Rattle", also reached the country top 20 on Billboard. The latter songs were included on her second album titled Cristy Lane Is the Name. The LP was released on LS Records in February 1978 and was reviewed favorably by Billboard magazine, who named it among its "Top Album Picks".

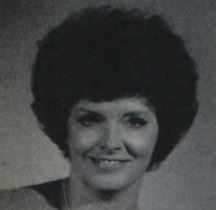
Cristy Lane in Billboard magazine, 1977

In November 1978, the Charlie Black-penned "I Just Can't Stay Married to You" was issued as a single and reached the top five of the Billboard country chart. It also became her second top ten hit in Canada, reaching number four on the RPM country survey. Her third studio LP, Love Lies, was issued on LS in December 1978. With her growing popularity, Lane's recordings were receiving attention from music critics and journalists. Greg Adams of AllMusic described her voice as "light", "pretty" and "distinctive". He also rated Love Lies four stars in his AllMusic album review and called it "among her best efforts". Writers Mary A. Bufwack and Robert K. Oermann called her vocal delivery "whispery", and characterized her songs as being "whimpering heartache material". Her success was recognized by the Academy of Country Music Awards, who named her their "Top New Female Vocalist" in 1979.

After Lane won the ACM award, Lee Stoller faced the possibility of declaring bankruptcy after losing GRT Records as his label distributor. Stoller arranged for Lane to sign with General Talent in Hollywood, California, who made arrangements to find a major record label interested in signing her. She had several offers from major labels before choosing United Artists Records in 1979. The label picked up her 1979 single, "Simple Little Words". The song became her fifth top ten hit on the Billboard country chart. United Artists agreed to use the LS record label logo in Lane's recordings and chose to compile several selections from her previous album to put into her next studio project, Simple Little Words. Three new recordings were also included on the album project, which was released in September 1979 on United Artists. It became her second LP to reach the Billboard Top Country Albums list, peaking at number 38. The album also spawned the top 20 Billboard country singles, "Slippin' Up, Slippin' Around" and "Come to My Love".

In the late 1970s, Lane began incorporating the Christian song, "One Day at a Time", into her live show. The song received a positive response from her fans, prompting Lane to record the track. To bring further attention to it, Lane and Stoller planned to release it as a single. However, United Artists was hesitant about the idea. The promotion department argued that the song was too religious for country music radio stations. Promotion director, Jerry Siebolt, also argued that the song had previously been recorded and had not "made an impression on the public". Composed by Marijohn Wilkin and Kris Kristofferson, "One Day at a Time" had first been a hit for Marilyn Sellars and again for Lena Martell. Lane eventually received approval from label record-head Don Grierson to release the track. At first, "One Day at a Time" received a mixed response from country disc jockeys. However, Lee Stoller used his position as manager to promote the song by calling radio stations continuously. In 1980, the song went to number one on the Billboard country singles chart. It was Lane's first and only single to reach the number one spot. The track also reached the top ten of the RPM Country Songs survey. It was included on her corresponding album titled Ask Me to Dance (1980). The disc was Lane's highest-charting Billboard country album, climbing to number 14. It also spent 34 weeks on the Cashbox country LP's chart. The album also spawned Lane's follow-up single release, "Sweet Sexy Eyes". The song reached number eight on the Billboard country survey in 1980.

Lane's career saw continued opportunities, including on television. During the early 1980s, she made frequent appearances on American television programs such as The Dinah Shore Show and The Merv Griffin Show. Her next single release was a cover of ABBA's "I Have a Dream" (1981). Despite receiving positive reviews, including one from Billboard magazine, the single was her final to chart in the top 20. A corresponding album of the same name followed that peaked in the top 40 on the Billboard country LP's chart. Lane continued to record "straight country music and secular pop", according to writer Greg Adams. Between 1981 and 1982, she had top 40 country hits with "Love to Love You", "Cheatin' Is Still on My Mind" and "Lies on Your Lips". The latter two recordings were featured on Lane's next studio release titled Fragile – Handle with Care (1981). The album peaked at number 43 on the country chart.

=== 1982–present: Christian music transition and slowing down ===
In 1982, Lane's country music commercial success began to wane and her singles reached progressively lower positions on the charts. Songs such as "The Good Old Days" and "I've Come Back (To Say I Love You One More Time)" reached chart positions outside the country top 40. Her next studio album titled Here's to Us (1982), only reached number 42 on the country albums list. Her sales decline was partly due to Stoller going to prison in 1982 on federal bribery and racketeering charges. His usual responsibilities of promotional and management were put aside and "caused a negative effect on Lane's organization," according to writer Greg Adams. For the first time, Lane had to tour without her husband. While not on stage, she spent most of the time in her bus's bedroom reading books and chose not to engage with others. "She had tried to put up a strong show of cheerfulness for the band. She didn’t want anyone to pity her," her biography recalled.

During his prison sentence, Stoller wrote Lane's biography, also titled One Day at a Time. In 1983, the biography was published and sold over one million copies. Advertisements for Lane's music and life story were also placed inside magazines, such as the National Enquirer and TV Guide. Stoller also used cable television as a way to market the album and it was sold in conjunction with her 1981 gospel album of the same name. The sales increase in her Christian music prompted Stoller to market Lane towards the genre.

In 1983, Lane's musical version of the poem "Footprints in the Sand" was a success on contemporary Christian radio. A corresponding Christian release of the same name followed in 1983 that also reached a charting position on the Billboard country albums list. The album would be reissued several times, which also helped increase sales of the product. Lane left Liberty Records in 1985 and began recording exclusively for LS Records. Her next studio project was an album of traditional pop standards called Harbor Lights. It was followed by a re-recorded patriotic salute to Vietnam veterans in 1986. She released the holiday-themed White Christmas in 1987.

In 1987, a pair of singles released on the label reached minor Billboard country chart positions, including a cover of "He's Got the Whole World in His Hands". The label released Lane's next studio album in 1988 titled All in His Hands. The record was sold on television and was a collection of more Christian material. It was followed by an album of secular cover tunes in 1991. Transitioning into the 1990s, Lane and Stoller opened the "Cristy Lane Theater" in Branson, Missouri. Lane was among the first country artists to use Branson as a tourist attraction to Nashville music fans. Lane's theater was also used as a way to introduce up-and-coming music acts. The theater was sold after Lane fell off the stage in 1995 and injured her leg.

With the introduction of the World Wide Web in the late 1990s, Lane and Stoller started selling her music through an official website. Previously-recorded Christian songs were re-packaged into various compilations by Lane during this time This proved successful when her 2003 compilation, One Day At A Time: 22 All Time Favorites Vol. I & II, was her first since 1983 to reach the country albums chart, peaking at number 62. In August 2003, she was honored by the Veterans of Foreign Wars in San Antonio, Texas, for her service to the military, and was inducted into its hall of fame. Lane was the first female country performer to be inducted into their hall of fame. Plans were also laid during this period to film a biopic of Lane's life story, however, it has yet to be produced.

== Awards and nominations ==
Year	Nominee / work	Award	Result	Ref.
1978	Academy of Country Music Awards	Top New Female Vocalist	Won	
1983	26th Annual Grammy Awards	Best Inspirational Performance – "I've Come Back (To Say I Love You One More Time)"	Nominated	
