= Steve Schaeffer =

American musician

Steve Schaeffer is an American studio musician who has played on more than 1,000 feature films and original soundtracks.

== Partial filmography ==
- Inside Man (2006)
- Blade Runner (1982)
- Bowfinger (1999)
- The Big Kahuna (1999)
- The Rat Pack (1998)
- That Thing You Do! (1996)
- The Hard Way (1991)
- The Meteor Man (film) (1993)
- L.A. Confidential (1990)
- Air Force One (1997)
- The Edge (1997)
- Along Came a Spider (2001)
- Star Trek Nemesis (2002)
- Looney Tunes: Back in Action (2003)
- Close Encounters of the Third Kind (1977)
- Amistad (1997)
- Catch Me If You Can (2002)
- War of the Worlds (2005)
- Big (1988)
- Mrs. Doubtfire (1993)
- Seven (1995)
- The Truth About Cats & Dogs (1996)
- Panic Room (2002)
- The Score (2001)
- The Bodyguard (1992)
- Forrest Gump (1994)
- MouseHunt (1997)
- Sarcasm (2000)
- The Polar Express (2004)
- The Mexican (2001)
- Cast Away (2000)
- What Women Want (2000)
- Anastasia (1997)
- Galaxy Quest (1999)
- Ice Age (2002)
- How to Lose a Guy in 10 Days (2003)
- Serenity (2005)
- The Fugitive (1993)
- Outbreak (1995)
- Space Jam (1996)
- King Kong (2005)
- Waiting to Exhale (1995)
- Meet the Fockers (2004)
- Pleasantville (1998)
- Monsters, Inc. (2001)
- War Horse (2011)
- Toy Story (1995)
- Toy Story 2 (1999)
- Cars (2006)
- HouseSitter (1992)
