= I Just Can't Stay Married to You =

Single by Cristy Lane

from the album Love Lies
- B-side: "Rainsong"
- Released: November 1978
- Recorded: October 1978
- Studio: LSI Studio
- Genre: Country; country pop
- Length: 2:49
- Label: LS
- Songwriters: Charlie Black; Rory Bourke; Jerry Gillespie
- Producer: Charlie Black

Cristy Lane singles chronology
"Penny Arcade" (1978)	"I Just Can't Stay Married to You" (1978)	"Simple Little Words" (1979)

"I Just Can't Stay Married to You" is a song written by Charlie Black, Rory Bourke and Jerry Gillespie. It was originally recorded by American country and Christian music singer Cristy Lane. The song was released as a single in 1978 via LS Records and became a top hit on the North American country music charts. It was also released on Lane's third studio album titled Love Lies. The song received positive reviews from critics.

== Background and recording ==
In the late 1970s, Cristy Lane achieved commercial success in the country field after her husband started his own record label. By releasing singles exclusively for the company, Lane had her first major hit in 1977 with "Let Me Down Easy". This was followed by a string of several more country hit singles, including "I Just Can't Stay Married to You". The song was written by Charlie Black, Rory Bourke and Jerry Gillespie. Lane recorded the track in October 1978 at the LSI Studio, located in Nashville, Tennessee. Charlie Black also produced the song. During the same session, Lane recorded nine additional tracks that would appear on her next album release.

== Release and reception ==
In November 1978, "I Just Can't Stay Married to You" was issued as a single on LS Records. It was backed by the flip side, "Rainsong". The song was aided in chart success after Lane performed the tune on the televised Academy of Country Music Awards in early 1979. Her performance eventually brought the song into the top ten of the Billboard Hot Country Songs chart, climbing to number five. It was Lane's fourth top ten hit in career on the Billboard chart. It reached a similar position on the RPM Country Singles chart in Canada, climbing to number four. "I Just Can't Stay Married to You" was released on Lane's third studio album titled Love Lies. The project was released on LS Records in December 1978. In reviewing her 1978 studio album, Greg Adams of AllMusic gave "I Just Can't Stay Married to You" a positive response, calling it "top five divorce song".

== Track listing ==
7" vinyl single

- "I Just Can't Stay Married to You" – 2:49
- "Rainsong" – 4:08

== Charts ==
=== Weekly charts ===
Chart (1978–79)	Peak position
Canada Country Songs (RPM)	4
US Hot Country Singles (Billboard)	5

=== Year-end charts ===
Chart (1979)	Position
US Hot Country Songs (Billboard)	38
