= Charlie Black =

American country music songwriter (1949–2021)

- Birth name: Charles Frank Black
- Born: November 23, 1949; Cheverly, Maryland
- Origin: Nashville, Tennessee
- Died: April 23, 2021 (aged 71)
- Genres: Country
- Occupations: Producer; Songwriter
- Years active: 1971–2021

Charles Frank Black (November 23, 1949 – April 23, 2021) was an American country music songwriter and record producer.

== Biography ==
Black graduated from University of Maryland in 1970 and moved to Nashville, Tennessee the same year. His first cut was "Girl, You Came and Eased My Mind" by Tommy Overstreet. Since then, he wrote singles for Anne Murray, Gary Morris, Earl Thomas Conley, Johnny Paycheck, and Phil Vassar. In 1991, the Nashville Songwriters Association International inducted Black into its hall of fame.

Black was also an occasional record producer. He produced early recordings by Cristy Lane, including her 1978 studio albums Cristy Lane Is the Name and Love Lies.

Black was married to Dana Hunt, who is also a songwriter. She co-wrote George Strait's singles "Check Yes or No" and "Write This Down".

Black died on April 23, 2021.
