= One Day at a Time (song) =

1974 song performed by Marilyn Sellars

Single by Marilyn Sellars

from the album One Day at a Time
- B-side: "California"
- Released: May 1974
- Genre: Country
- Length: 3:32
- Label: Mega
- Songwriters: Marijohn Wilkin, Kris Kristofferson
- Producer: Clarence Selman

Marilyn Sellars singles chronology
"One Day at a Time" (1974)	"He's Everywhere" (1974)

"One Day at a Time" is a popular country and western-style Christian song written by Marijohn Wilkin and Kris Kristofferson. It has been recorded by over 200 artists and has reached No. 1 in several territories. Scottish singer Lena Martell had a UK Singles Chart number one with her version in 1979.

== Marilyn Sellars version ==
The song was first recorded by American country singer Marilyn Sellars in 1974. This version became a US top 40 hit and top 20 hit on the Country charts. Following this, it won the 1975 Gospel Music Association (GMA) Dove Awards for best song.

=== Chart positions ===
Chart (1974)	Peak position
U.S. Billboard Hot Country Singles	19
U.S. Billboard Hot 100	37

== Gloria version ==
"One Day at a Time"

Single by Gloria

from the album When I Sing for Him
- B-side: "The Old Rugged Cross"
- Released: August 1977
- Genre: Country
- Length: 3:01
- Label: Release
- Songwriters: Marijohn Wilkin, Kris Kristofferson
- Producer: Tony Dirizziano

Gloria singles chronology
""I'll Get Over You"" (1977)	"One Day at a Time" (1977)	""Liffey Tinker"" (1978)

"One Day at a Time" was recorded by Gloria who released it as a single in August 1977. The song originally peaked at No.5 in the Irish singles charts, before being re-released a year later. From here it peaked at No.1 (over a year after it had entered the chart) and remained on the charts throughout the whole of 1979 and into 1980, eventually spending a total of 90 weeks in the Irish top 30 - the longest run by any song in Irish Chart history.

=== Chart history ===
Chart (1977)	Peak position
Ireland (IRMA)	1

== Lena Martell version ==
Scottish singer Lena Martell recorded the song for the UK market in 1977. The song reached No. 40 on the Canadian AC Charts April 29, 1978. A re-release two years later became a big success and reached No. 1 on the UK Singles Chart in October 1979 for three weeks, and No. 27 in Ireland.

== Cristy Lane version ==
"One Day at a Time"

Single by Cristy Lane

from the album Ask Me to Dance
- B-side: "I Knew the Mason"
- Released: February 1980
- Recorded: November 19, 1979
- Genre: Country
- Length: 3:12
- Label: United Artists X1342-Y
- Songwriters: Marijohn Wilkin and Kris Kristofferson
- Producer: Jerry Gillespie

Cristy Lane singles chronology
"Come to My Love" (1979)	"One Day at a Time" (1980)	"Sweet Sexy Eyes" (1980)

"One Day at a Time" became best known among country fans when recorded by American country gospel singer Cristy Lane. Lane had started enjoying mainstream success in the late 1970s through the release of several secular hits, including "Let Me Down Easy" and "Simple Little Words." In 1979, Lane recorded the song after it became a No. 1 hit in the United Kingdom by Lena Martell. At first, United Artists Records balked at releasing the song, despite its previous track record of success, but Lane's husband-manager, Lee Stoller, predicted the song would be successful, and UA relented. The song was released in the late winter of 1980, and by the end of the spring, the song was No. 1 on the Billboard Hot Country Singles chart.

"One Day at a Time" was Lane's only No. 1 hit. For Kristofferson, the song was his sixth No. 1 as a songwriter and first in six years (his last being 1974's "Please Don't Tell Me How the Story Ends" by Ronnie Milsap).

=== Chart positions ===
Chart (1980)	Peak position
U.S. Billboard Hot Country Singles	1
Australia (Kent Music Report)	91
Canadian RPM Country 75 Singles	10
New Zealand Singles Chart	5

=== Year-end charts ===
Chart (1980)	Position
US Country Songs (Billboard)	2

== Other versions ==
The song went on to be recorded by many artists, including the Alexander Brothers, Judy Collins, Phil Coulter, Floyd Cramer, Carlene Davis, Florida Boys, Roger Whittaker, Tennessee Ernie Ford, Foster and Allen, Bill Gaither, Lynda Randle, Ivan Parker, The King's Heralds, Arthur Greenslade, Lee Greenwood, Roy Drusky, George Hamilton IV, Lulu Roman, and Brotherhood of Man.

The Quebec country singer André Breton recorded the French version "Un jour à la fois". Paulino Bernal and Ricardo Mejia were the first to record the song in Spanish titled "Un dia a la vez" from the album Misioneros De Cristo. The Welsh folk singer Trebor Edwards released a Welsh-language version "Un Dydd Ar Y Tro" in 1980 with the words translated by Margaret Edwards. It was included on his album of the same name and a single was released in 1981.

== See also ==
- Dove Award for Song of the Year
