= Jerry Gillespie =

American country songwriter

Jerry Wayne Gillespie
- Born: Decatur, Alabama, United States
- Genre: Country music
- Occupations: Songwriter, record producer

Jerry Wayne Gillespie (born in Decatur, Alabama) is an American country songwriter. He co-wrote "Do You Love as Good as You Look", a #1 song in 1981 for The Bellamy Brothers, and wrote "Heaven's Just a Sin Away", a #1 country hit in 1977 for The Kendalls. He co-wrote "Somebody's Knockin'", a Grammy Award finalist in 1982 for Terri Gibbs, and "I Just Can't Stay Married to You", a #5 hit for Christy Lane in 1979.

He wrote or co-wrote a number of successful songs for Tommy Overstreet, including "Gwen (Congratulations)", co-written with Ricci Mareno, a #5 country hit in 1971, and "That's When My Woman Begins a #6 country hit in 1975. Gillespie also worked as a producer with Christy Lane, The Kendalls, and Micki Fuhrman.

Gillespie's first music venture was with his cousin Gary in a Nashville-area teenaged rock band named "The Valiants". The band put out two singles in 1965-1966 with songs written by Gillespie.

== Other Gillespie songs that charted ==
- "Catch the Wind" (Jerry Gillespie, Ricci Mareno) Jack Barlow, #26 Country, 1971
- "A Seed Before the Rose" (Jerry Gillespie, Ricci Mareno) Tommy Overstreet, #16 Country, 1972
- "It'll Be Me" (Gillespie/Clement/Bourke) Tom Jones, #34 Country, 1983
- "You Really Go for the Heart" (Charles Black, Tommy Rocco, Jerry Gillespie) Dan Seals, #37 Country, 1983
- "We Just Gotta Dance" (Jerry Gillespie) Karen Taylor-Good, #66 Country, 1984
- "I Love You By Heart" (Jerry Gillespie, Stan Webb), Sylvia and Michael Johnson, #9 Country, 1985
- "She's Ready for Someone to Love Her" (Charles Black, Jerry Gillespie, Tommy Rocco) The Osmond Brothers, #67 Country, 1983. Also covered by Kenny Rogers and Jerry Reed
- "Baby Wants", The Osmond Brothers, #45 Country, 1986

"Heaven's Just a Sin Away" also charted in a minor way for Kelly Willis in 1993 (#63 Country). "Old Pictures" and "Dr. Dr." were written by Gillespie with K. T. Oslin, and appeared on her platinum-selling 1987 debut album 80s Ladies. His Christmas song "Blue Decorations" was covered by B. B. King on his 2001 Grammy-winning album A Christmas Celebration of Hope.
