= Let Me Down Easy (Lobo song) =

1972 song by Lobo

Song by Lobo

from the album Of a Simple Man
- Released: October 1972
- Recorded: 1972
- Studio: Mastersound Studios, Atlanta, GA
- Genre: Pop; Soft rock
- Length: 2:45
- Label: Big Tree
- Songwriter: Lobo
- Producer: Phil Gernhard

"Let Me Down Easy" is a song written and originally recorded by American singer–songwriter Lobo. The track first appeared on his 1972 album titled, Of a Simple Man. In 1977, it was recorded by American Christian and country singer Cristy Lane. It was released as a single via LS Records and became Lane's first major hit in the country music field. The song helped establish her career and would later be released on the 1977's Cristy Lane Is the Name. It received a positive response from writers and critics.

== Lobo version ==
In the early 1970s, Lobo had several hits on the American pop charts with songs like "Me and You and a Dog Named Boo" and "I'd Love You to Want Me". In 1972, he released his next album titled Of a Simple Man. The album featured selections composed by Lobo, including "Let Me Down Easy", which was originally issued only as an album track on the project. The album was produced by Phil Gernhard was released on Big Tree Records in October 1972 as a vinyl LP.

== Cristy Lane version ==
"Let Me Down Easy"

Single by Cristy Lane

from the album Cristy Lane Is the Name
- B-side: "This Is The First Time (I've Seen The Last Time On Your Face)"
- Released: August 1977
- Recorded: June 1977
- Studio: LSI Studio
- Genre: Country; soft pop
- Length: 2:26
- Label: LS
- Songwriter: Lobo
- Producer: Charlie Black

Cristy Lane singles chronology
"Sweet Deceiver" (1977)	"Let Me Down Easy" (1977)	"Shake Me I Rattle" (1977)

=== Background ===
After years attempting to launch his wife's country music singing career, Lee Stoller established his own recording label in the early 1970s titled LS Records. The couple also moved to Nashville, Tennessee and Lane soon began recording exclusively for the label. By 1976, two Lane singles made the national country charts: "Tryin' to Forget About You" and "Sweet Deceiver". Stoller would later find Lane's next single release titled "Let Me Down Easy". The tune was composed by musician Lobo, along with Barry Sandlin and Barry Windslow. It was recorded in June 1977 at Stoller's LSI Studios, located in Nashville. The session was produced by Nashville songwriter Charlie Black. Also recorded during the same session were the track "This Is The First Time (I've Seen The Last Time On Your Face)" and "I Sure Wear My Memory Well".

=== Release and reception ===
"Let Me Down Easy" was issued as a single in August 1977 on LS Records. It was backed on the B-side by "This Is The First Time (I've Seen The Last Time On Your Face)". The single spent multiple weeks on the Billboard Hot Country Singles chart and eventually reached number seven. It became Lane's first major hit as a country artist and her first of several top ten hit records. The track also peaked at number 28 on the Canadian RPM Country Songs chart, becoming her first single to chart there. "Let Me Down Easy" was included on Lane's second studio record, which was issued in 1978 titled Cristy Lane Is the Name. In their review of Cristy Lane Is the Name, Billboard magazine named "Let Me Down Easy" among the record's "best cuts". In later years, Lindsay Planer of AllMusic positively commented on the song, calling it a "hot-steppin' break-up song".

=== Track listing ===
7" vinyl single

- "Let Me Down Easy" – 2:26
- "This Is The First Time (I've Seen The Last Time On Your Face)" – 3:24

=== Charts ===
Chart (1977)	Peak position
Canada Country Songs (RPM)	28
US Hot Country Singles (Billboard)	7
