= LS Records =

American record label

LS
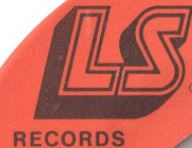
- Founded: 1975
- Founder: Lee Stoller
- Genre: Country; Christian
- Country of origin: United States
- Location: Nashville, Tennessee

LS Records is an American record label. It was founded by Lee Stoller in 1975. The label is best known for distributing the works of country singer Cristy Lane, who is Stoller's wife.

== History ==
In the mid 1970s, Lee Stoller chose to sign country music act, Daniel Willis, as the label's first artist. Willis was later dropped from the label after having limited success under LS. According to the 1983 biography on Cristy Lane, Willis' career "proved to be quite expensive" and his singles were "barely charting".

LS Records was best known for bringing Stoller's wife, Cristy Lane (an American country-gospel music singer) to fame in the late 70s. LS released Lane's first singles in 1976, and her first charting singles, "Trying to Forget About You" and "Sweet Deceiver" in 1977. When Lane had her first Top 10 hit with "Let Me Down Easy" the same year, LS released her 1978 debut album, Cristy Lane is the Name, and her 1979 album, Love Lies.

However, also in 1979, Lane gained a major label recording contract with United Artists Records after having a string of Top 10 and 20 hit singles between 1977 and 1979. However, LS did release Lane's One Day at a Time album in 1981, which was promoted on television.

After departing United Artists (it changed to Liberty Records in 1980), LS released Lane's two studio albums in 1985 and 1986. In the past twenty years, LS has released over a dozen compilation albums of Lane's hits, and some Gospel and country music covers.

LS Records received media attention in 1988 for the single "Spelling on the Stone", released by an uncredited artist purporting to be Elvis Presley. In the recording, the vocalist claims that Presley had not actually died in 1977, then a popular rumor circulating about the singer.
