= 1979 in country music =

This is a list of notable events in country music that took place in the year 1979.

== Events ==
- March 2 - Queen of Country Music, Loretta Lynn is named ACM Artist of the Decade after the dominant hold Lynn held on the charts during the decade. Lynn is the only female ACM Artist of the Decade.
- March 3 — The Public Broadcasting Service (PBS) would telecast an entire Saturday night live from the Grand Ole Opry for the very first time – the show would last until 12:30 am with a half-hour break between the two shows at 9 pm CDT. The show featured many acts including Del Reeves, Barbara Mandrell, Bill Monroe, Hank Snow, Roy Acuff, Minnie Pearl, Don Gibson and many others. The telecast became the most popular one of the year for PBS, and was a part of their March fundraising campaigns.
- December 21 — The Electric Horseman, starring Robert Redford and Jane Fonda, premieres. Willie Nelson is a supporting character in the film, and he will contribute to the movie's soundtrack.

== Top hits of the year ==
=== Number one hits ===
==== United States ====
(as certified by Billboard)

Date	Single Name	Artist	Wks. No.1	CAN peak	Spec. Note
January 6	Tulsa Time	Don Williams	1
January 13	Lady Lay Down	John Conlee	1	2	^{[A]}
January 20	I Really Got the Feeling/Baby I'm Burning	Dolly Parton	1
January 27	Why Have You Left the One You Left Me For	Crystal Gayle	2
February 10	Every Which Way but Loose	Eddie Rabbitt	3
March 3	Golden Tears	Dave & Sugar	3	2	^{[B]}
March 24	I Just Fall in Love Again	Anne Murray	3		^{[1]}
April 14	(If Loving You Is Wrong); I Don't Want to Be Right	Barbara Mandrell	1		Cover of the Luther Ingram hit.
April 21	All I Ever Need Is You	Kenny Rogers and Dottie West	1	2	Cover of the Sonny and Cher hit.
April 28	Where Do I Put Her Memory	Charley Pride	1
May 5	Backside of Thirty	John Conlee	1	5
May 12	Don't Take It Away	Conway Twitty	1
May 19	If I Said You Have a Beautiful Body; Would You Hold It Against Me	The Bellamy Brothers	3	24	^{[A]}
June 9	She Believes in Me	Kenny Rogers	2
June 23	Nobody Likes Sad Songs	Ronnie Milsap	1
June 30	Amanda	Waylon Jennings	3
July 21	Shadows in the Moonlight	Anne Murray	1
July 28	You're the Only One	Dolly Parton	2
August 11	Suspicions	Eddie Rabbitt	1
August 18	Coca-Cola Cowboy	Mel Tillis	1	3
August 25	The Devil Went Down to Georgia	The Charlie Daniels Band	1		^{[C]}
September 1	Heartbreak Hotel	Willie Nelson and Leon Russell	1		^{[C] – Leon Russell} Cover of the Elvis Presley hit.
September 8	I May Never Get to Heaven	Conway Twitty	1
September 15	You're My Jamaica	Charley Pride	1
September 22	Just Good Ol' Boys	Moe Bandy and Joe Stampley	1	8	^{[A] – Moe Bandy}^{[B] – Joe Stampley}
September 29	It Must Be Love	Don Williams	1	2
October 6	Last Cheater's Waltz	T. G. Sheppard	2	7
October 20	All the Gold in California	Larry Gatlin & the Gatlin Brothers	2	2
November 3	You Decorated My Life	Kenny Rogers	2
November 17	Come with Me	Waylon Jennings	2
December 1	Broken Hearted Me	Anne Murray	1
December 8	I Cheated Me Right Out of You	Moe Bandy	1		^{[B]}
December 15	Happy Birthday Darlin'	Conway Twitty	3	13

Notes

- 1 No. 1 song of the year, as determined by Billboard.
- A First Billboard No. 1 hit for that artist.
- B Last Billboard No. 1 hit for that artist.
- C Only Billboard No. 1 hit for that artist to date.

==== Canada ====
(as certified by RPM)

Date	Single Name	Artist	Wks. No.1	U.S. peak	Spec. Note
January 13	Burgers and Fries	Charley Pride	1	2
January 20	Don't You Think This Outlaw Bit's; Done Got Out of Hand	Waylon Jennings	1	5
January 27	Tulsa Time	Don Williams	1
February 3	Your Love Had Taken Me That High	Conway Twitty	1	3
February 10	I Really Got the Feeling/Baby I'm Burning	Dolly Parton	1
February 17	Why Have You Left the One You Left Me For	Crystal Gayle	1
February 24	Every Which Way but Loose	Eddie Rabbitt	3
March 17	Back on My Mind Again	Ronnie Milsap	1	2
March 24	You Made My Day Tonight	Canadian Zephyr	1	—	^{[A]}
March 31	I Just Fall in Love Again	Anne Murray	2
April 14	It's a Cheating Situation	Moe Bandy with Janie Fricke	1	2	^{[A] – Moe Bandy}^{[A] – Janie Fricke}
April 21	Sweet Memories	Willie Nelson	1	4
April 28	(If Loving You Is Wrong) I Don't Want to Be Right	Barbara Mandrell	1
May 5	Where Do I Put Her Memory	Charley Pride	2
May 19	Don't Take It Away	Conway Twitty	1
May 26	I'm Getting High Remembering	Carroll Baker	1	—
June 2	Sail Away	The Oak Ridge Boys	4	2
June 30	Nobody Likes Sad Songs	Ronnie Milsap	1
July 7	She Believes in Me	Kenny Rogers	1
July 14	Amanda	Waylon Jennings	1
July 21	You're the Only One	Dolly Parton	4		^{[1], [2]}: Fell to #2 on the week of August 4.
August 4	Shadows in the Moonlight	Anne Murray	1
August 11	(Ghost) Riders in the Sky	Johnny Cash	1	2
September 1	Suspicions	Eddie Rabbitt	1
September 8	The Devil Went Down to Georgia	Charlie Daniels	2		^{[C]}
September 22	'Til I Can Make It on My Own	Kenny Rogers and Dottie West	1	3	^{[B] – Dottie West}
September 29	Heartbreak Hotel	Willie Nelson and Leon Russell	1		^{[C] – Leon Russell}
October 6	You're My Jamaica	Charley Pride	1
October 13	I May Never Get to Heaven	Conway Twitty	1
October 20	Before My Time	John Conlee	1	2	^{[A]}
October 27	Stolen Moments	R. Harlan Smith and Chris Nielsen	1	—	^{[B] – R. Harlan Smith}^{[C] – Chris Nielsen}
November 3	Dream On	The Oak Ridge Boys	1	7
November 10	You Decorated My Life	Kenny Rogers	2
November 24	Broken Hearted Me	Anne Murray	1
December 1	Come with Me	Waylon Jennings	1
December 8	Half the Way	Crystal Gayle	1	2
December 15	I Cheated Me Right Out of You	Moe Bandy	1
December 22	Whiskey Bent and Hell Bound	Hank Williams, Jr.	2	2

Notes

- 1 No. 1 song of the year, as determined by RPM.
- 2 Song dropped from No. 1 and later returned to top spot.
- A First RPM No. 1 hit for that artist.
- B Last RPM No. 1 hit for that artist.
- C Only RPM No. 1 hit for that artist.

=== Other major hits ===
==== Singles released by American artists ====
US	CAN	Single	Artist
16	16	Alibis	Johnny Rodriguez
16	32	All-Around Cowboy	Marty Robbins
10	4	Are You Sincere	Elvis Presley
12	14	As Long as I Can Wake Up in Your Arms	Kenny O'Dell
9	21	Barstool Mountain	Moe Bandy
6	16	Blind in Love	Mel Tillis
6	7	Blue Kentucky Girl	Emmylou Harris
25	17	Buenos Dias Argentina	Marty Robbins
3	3	Come On In	The Oak Ridge Boys
16	10	Crazy Arms	Willie Nelson
17	—	Crazy Blue Eyes	Lacy J. Dalton
14	25	Daddy	Donna Fargo
18	36	Darlin'	David Rogers
17	—	Della and the Dealer	Hoyt Axton
5	3	Do You Ever Fool Around	Joe Stampley
10	—	Don't Let Me Cross Over	Jim Reeves with Deborah Allen
6	13	Down on the Rio Grande	Johnny Rodriguez
16	60	Down to Earth Woman	Kenny Dale
14	7	Everlasting Love	Narvel Felts
10	11	Fall in Love with Me Tonight	Randy Barlow
4	16	Family Tradition	Hank Williams, Jr.
5	9	Farewell Party	Gene Watson
19	22	Feet	Ray Price
4	5	Fooled by a Feeling	Barbara Mandrell
3	14	Fools	Jim Ed Brown and Helen Cornelius
17	44	Fools for Each Other	Johnny Rodriguez
14	21	Gimme Back My Blues	Jerry Reed
8	6	Happy Together	T. G. Sheppard
11	28	Here We Are Again	The Statler Brothers
25	11	Hound Dog Man	Glen Campbell
7	18	How to Be a Country Star	The Statler Brothers
10	18	I Ain't Got No Business Doin' Business Today	Razzy Bailey
3	2	I Can't Feel You Anymore	Loretta Lynn
16	33	I Don't Do Like That No More	The Kendalls
12	21	I Don't Lie	Joe Stampley
5	4	I Had a Lovely Time	The Kendalls
16	65	I Hate the Way I Love It	Johnny Rodriguez and Charly McClain
5	4	I Just Can't Stay Married to You	Cristy Lane
10	12	I Know a Heartache When I See One	Jennifer Warnes
26	10	I Lost My Head	Charlie Rich
18	40	I Love How You Love Me	Lynn Anderson
21	9	I Will Survive	Billie Jo Spears
20	55	I'd Rather Go on Hurtin'	Joe Sun
14	7	I'll Love Away Your Troubles for Awhile	Janie Fricke
3	2	I'll Wake You Up When I Get Home	Charlie Rich
13	8	I'm Gonna Love You	Glen Campbell
18	6	I'm the Singer, You're the Song	Tanya Tucker
14	16	I've Been Waiting for You All of My Life	Con Hunley
7	5	I've Done Enough Dying Today	Larry Gatlin
5	2	I've Got a Picture of Us on My Mind	Loretta Lynn
13	12	If Everyone Had Someone Like You	Eddy Arnold
4	8	If I Could Write a Song (As Beautiful as You)	Billy "Crash" Craddock
18	—	If I Fell in Love with You	Rex Allen, Jr.
10	45	If I Give My Heart to You	Margo Smith
6	33	If Love Had a Face	Razzy Bailey
6	9	In No Time at All	Ronnie Milsap
10	7	Isn't It Always Love	Lynn Anderson
12	13	It's Time We Talk Things Over	Rex Allen, Jr. and The Byrds
11	4	Just Like Real People	The Kendalls
10	10	Just Long Enough to Say Goodbye	Mickey Gilley
9	21	The Lady in the Blue Mercedes	Johnny Duncan
3	2	Lay Down Beside Me	Don Williams
14	17	Liberated Woman	John Wesley Ryles
16	25	Lovin' On	The Bellamy Brothers
2	3	Lying in Love with You	Jim Ed Brown and Helen Cornelius
7	4	Maybellene	George Jones and Johnny Paycheck
9	—	Me and My Broken Heart	Rex Allen, Jr.
19	3	Mississippi	Charlie Daniels
20	65	Mr. Jones	Big Al Downing
11	20	My Heart Has a Mind of Its Own	Debby Boone
4	4	My Own Kind of Hat	Merle Haggard
8	62	My Silver Lining	Mickey Gilley
4	7	My World Begins and Ends with You	Dave & Sugar
17	13	Next Best Feeling	Mary K. Miller
—	10	Nickels and Dimes	Nana Mouskouri
17	38	No Memories Hangin' Round	Rosanne Cash with Bobby Bare
7	5	No One Else in the World	Tammy Wynette
10	33	Nothing as Original as You	The Statler Brothers
5	7	The Official Historian on Shirley Jean Berrell	The Statler Brothers
17	—	The One Thing My Lady Never Puts Into Words	Mel Street
7	20	Only Love Can Break a Heart	Kenny Dale
5	2	Pick the Wildwood Flower	Gene Watson
11	44	Play Together Again, Again	Buck Owens with Emmylou Harris
9	9	Put Your Clothes Back On	Joe Stampley
4	2	Red Bandana	Merle Haggard
13	—	Reunited	Louise Mandrell and R. C. Bannon
16	34	Robinhood	Billy "Crash" Craddock
18	34	Rockin' My Life Away	Jerry Lee Lewis
14	—	A Rusty Old Halo	Hoyt Axton
16	—	Sail On	Tom Grant
4	20	Save the Last Dance for Me	Emmylou Harris
26	18	Save the Last Dance for Me	Jerry Lee Lewis
10	—	Say You Love Me	Stephanie Winslow
18	17	Second-Hand Satin Lady (And a Bargain Basement Boy)	Jerry Reed
2	4	Send Me Down to Tucson	Mel Tillis
15	5	September Song	Willie Nelson
15	38	Sharing	Kenny Dale
3	6	Should I Come Home (Or Should I Go Crazy)	Gene Watson
10	26	Simple Little Words	Cristy Lane
20	42	Since I Fell for You	Con Hunley
17	22	Slippin' Up, Slippin' Around	Cristy Lane
6	8	Slow Dancing	Johnny Duncan
6	5	Somebody Special	Donna Fargo
11	—	Someone Is Looking for Someone Like You	Gail Davies
14	18	Son of Clayton Delaney	Tom T. Hall
13	26	The Song We Made Love To	Mickey Gilley
20	7	Spanish Eyes	Charlie Rich
6	—	Stay with Me	Dave & Sugar
26	13	Steady as the Rain	Stella Parton
7	17	Still a Woman	Margo Smith
19	46	Sweet Dreams	Reba McEntire
10	14	Sweet Melinda	Randy Barlow
7	6	Sweet Summer Lovin'	Dolly Parton
8	18	Tell Me What It's Like	Brenda Lee
5	3	Texas (When I Die)	Tanya Tucker
18	44	That's the Only Way to Say Good Morning	Ray Price
20	21	There Is a Miracle in You	Tom T. Hall
6	3	There's a Honky Tonk Angel (Who'll Take Me Back In)	Elvis Presley
6	6	They Call It Making Love	Tammy Wynette
20	15	This Is a Love Song	Bill Anderson
6	5	Tonight She's Gonna Love Me (Like There Was No Tomorrow)	Razzy Bailey
13	12	Too Far Gone	Emmylou Harris
18	59	Touch Me (I'll Be Your Fool Once More)	Big Al Downing
15	18	Touch Me with Magic	Marty Robbins
12	18	Tryin' to Satisfy You	Dottsy
6	51	Two Steps Forward and Three Steps Back	Susie Allanson
22	13	Walking Piece of Heaven	Freddy Fender
31	18	Walking the Floor Over You	Ernest Tubb and Merle Haggard
16	—	What a Lie	Sammi Smith
11	31	When a Love Ain't Right	Charly McClain
3	3	When I Dream	Crystal Gayle
12	3	Whiskey River	Willie Nelson
20	24	Who Will the Next Fool Be	Jerry Lee Lewis
8	—	Wisdom of a Fool	Jacky Ward
8	7	Words	Susie Allanson
18	35	World's Most Perfect Woman	Ronnie McDowell
5	11	You Ain't Just Whistlin' Dixie	The Bellamy Brothers
14	26	You Can Have Her	George Jones and Johnny Paycheck
10	8	You Don't Bring Me Flowers	Jim Ed Brown and Helen Cornelius
4	20	You Feel Good All Over	T. G. Sheppard
12	28	You Pick Me Up (And Put Me Down)	Dottie West
11	26	You Show Me Your Heart (And I'll Show You Mine)	Tom T. Hall
20	24	You Were Always on My Mind	John Wesley Ryles
20	66	You're a Part of Me	Charly McClain
14	—	You're My Kind of Woman	Jacky Ward
16	27	You've Got Somebody, I've Got Somebody	Vern Gosdin
7	14	Your Kisses Will	Crystal Gayle

==== Singles released by Canadian artists ====
US	CAN	Single	Artist
—	6	The Ballad of the Duke	Dallas Harms
—	13	Bingo and Another World	Rex Hemeon
—	5	Build My Life Around You	Carroll Baker
—	9	Easy	Eddie Eastman
—	20	Easy Does It	Rondini
—	10	Every Woman	Van Dyke
—	18	Everyone's Laughin' but Me	Chris Nielsen
—	9	Four States to Go	Alex Fraser
—	17	Half of What You've Been to Me	R. Harlan Smith
—	13	Hell Bent for Mexico	Mercey Brothers
—	12	High on You	Dick Damron
—	7	I Picked a Daisy	Dallas Harms
—	16	Kelly Green	Glory-Anne Carriere
—	16	Love Catch Fire	Ian Kemp
—	8	Love Is Such an Easy Word to Say	Eddie Eastman
—	3	Love When It Leaves Here	Canadian Zephyr
—	6	Loving You	Mike Graham
—	8	Mes Amis O Canada	Laura Vinson
—	15	Mighty Big to Me	Alex Fraser
—	6	Rachel I'm Just Not That Strong	David Thompson
—	7	Silver and Shine	Dick Damron
—	19	Some Kind of Woman	The Good Brothers
—	10	Sorry and the Hobo	Orval Prophet
—	4	Stay with Me	Family Brown
—	9	Stranger	Mercey Brothers
33	19	Takes a Fool to Love a Fool	Burton Cummings
—	15	Time to Go	Terry Carisse
—	9	Willie Boy	Wayne Rostad
100	6	You Can't Make Love to a Memory	Iris Larratt

== Top new album releases ==
Album	Artist	Record Label
3/4 Lonely	T. G. Sheppard	Warner Bros./Curb
All Around Cowboy	Marty Robbins	Columbia
Alone Too Long	Charly McClain	Epic
Are You Sincere	Mel Tillis	MCA
Blue Kentucky Girl	Emmylou Harris	Reprise
Classics	Kenny Rogers and Dottie West	United Artists
Cross Winds	Conway Twitty	MCA
The Electric Horseman	Willie Nelson	Columbia/CBS
Encore!	Jeanne Pruett	IBC
From the Heart	Janie Fricke	Columbia
Great Balls of Fire	Dolly Parton	RCA
I Don't Lie	Joe Stampley	Epic
Images	Ronnie Milsap	RCA
It's a Cheating Situation	Moe Bandy	Columbia
Jim Ed and Helen	Jim Ed Brown and Helen Cornelius	RCA Victor
Just for the Record	Barbara Mandrell	MCA
Just Good Ol' Boys	Moe Bandy and Joe Stampley	Columbia/CBS
Kenny	Kenny Rogers	United Artists
Ladies Choice	Bill Anderson	MCA
Loveline	Eddie Rabbitt	Elektra
New Kind of Feeling	Anne Murray	Capitol
Million Mile Reflections	The Charlie Daniels Band	Epic
Miss the Mississippi...and You	Crystal Gayle	United Artists
Mr. Entertainer	Mel Tillis	MCA
The Oak Ridge Boys Have Arrived	Oak Ridge Boys	MCA
One for the Road	Willie Nelson and Leon Russell	Columbia/CBS
The Originals	Statler Brothers	Mercury/Polygram
Out of a Dream	Reba McEntire	Mercury/Polygram
Outlaw is Just a State of Mind	Lynn Anderson	Columbia
The Performer	Marty Robbins	Columbia
Portraits	Don Williams	MCA
Rides Again Vol. 2	Statler Brothers	Mercury/Polygram
See You When the Sun Goes Down	Johnny Duncan	Columbia
Simple Little Words	Cristy Lane	United Artists
Sings Kris Kristofferson	Willie Nelson	Columbia/CBS
Songs We Made Love To	Mickey Gilley	Playboy
Stay with Me/Golden Tears	Dave & Sugar	RCA Victor
Straight Ahead	Larry Gatlin and the Gatlin Brothers	Columbia
Straight From Texas	Johnny Duncan	Columbia
Take Heart	Juice Newton	Capitol
The Two and Only	The Bellamy Brothers	Warner Bros./Curb
We Should Be Together	Crystal Gayle	United Artists
What Goes Around Comes Around	Waylon Jennings	RCA
Whiskey Bent and Hell Bound	Hank Williams Jr.	Warner Bros.
A Woman	Margo Smith	Warner Bros.
You Don't Bring Me Flowers	Jim Ed Brown and Helen Cornelius	RCA Victor
You're My Jamaica	Charley Pride	RCA

=== Christmas albums ===
Album	Artist	Record Label
Light of the Stable	Emmylou Harris	Reprise
Pretty Paper	Willie Nelson	CBS

== Births ==
- February 1 — Julie Roberts, country music singer-songwriter.
- April 24 — Rebecca Lynn Howard, pop-styled singer-songwriter of the late 1990s and early 2000s.
- May 18 – David Nail, singer of the 2010s best known for "Let It Rain."
- June 10 — Lee Brice, singer-songwriter of the 2010 best for his hits "Love Like Crazy" and the number-one single "A Woman Like You" as well as his 2012 second studio album Hard 2 Love.
- July 24 – Jerrod Niemann, songwriter who wrote Garth Brooks' hit "Good Ride Cowboy" before achieving his own success with hits like "Lover, Lover."

== Deaths ==
- January 8 — Sara Carter, 80, lead singer and member of the pioneering Carter Family.
- February 21 — Carl T. Sprague, 83, "The Original Singing Cowboy," active mainly in the 1920s.
- May 11 — Lester Flatt, 64, early bluegrass pioneer who, with Earl Scruggs, formed the Foggy Mountain Boys. (heart failure)
- November 29 — Jimmie Tarlton, 87, one half of Darby and Tarlton, an early country music duo.

== Country Music Hall of Fame Inductees ==
- Hubert Long (1923–1972)
- Hank Snow (1914–1999)

== Major awards ==
=== Grammy Awards ===
- Best Female Country Vocal Performance — Blue Kentucky Girl, Emmylou Harris
- Best Male Country Vocal Performance — "The Gambler", Kenny Rogers
- Best Country Performance by a Duo or Group with Vocal — "The Devil Went Down to Georgia", Charlie Daniels Band
- Best Country Instrumental Performance — "Big Sandy/Leather Britches", Doc Watson and Merle Watson
- Best Country Song — "You Decorated My Life", Debbie Hupp and Bob Morrison (Performer: Kenny Rogers)

=== Juno Awards ===
- Country Male Vocalist of the Year — Ronnie Prophet
- Country Female Vocalist of the Year — Carroll Baker
- Country Group or Duo of the Year — The Good Brothers

=== Academy of Country Music ===
- Entertainer of the Year — Willie Nelson
- Song of the Year — "It's a Cheating Situation", Sonny Throckmorton and Curly Putman (Performer: Moe Bandy)
- Single of the Year — "All the Gold in California", Larry Gatlin
- Album of the Year — Straight Ahead, Larry Gatlin
- Top Male Vocalist — Larry Gatlin
- Top Female Vocalist — Crystal Gayle
- Top Vocal Duo — Joe Stampley and Moe Bandy
- Top New Male Vocalist — R. C. Bannon
- Top New Female Vocalist — Lacy J. Dalton

=== Country Music Association ===
- Entertainer of the Year — Willie Nelson
- Song of the Year — "The Gambler", Don Schlitz (Performer: Kenny Rogers)
- Single of the Year — "The Devil Went Down to Georgia", Charlie Daniels Band
- Album of the Year — The Gambler, Kenny Rogers
- Male Vocalist of the Year — Kenny Rogers
- Female Vocalist of the Year — Barbara Mandrell
- Vocal Duo of the Year — Kenny Rogers and Dottie West
- Vocal Group of the Year — The Statler Brothers
- Instrumentalist of the Year — Charlie Daniels
- Instrumental Group of the Year — Charlie Daniels Band

=== Hollywood Walk of Fame ===
Country stars who got a star in 1979

Kenny Rogers

== Other links ==
- Country Music Association
- Inductees of the Country Music Hall of Fame
