= List of RPM number-one country singles of 1979 =

These are the Canadian number-one country songs of 1979, per the RPM Country Tracks chart.

Issue date	Title	Artist
January 13	Burgers and Fries	Charley Pride
January 20	Don't You Think This Outlaw Bit's Done Got Out of Hand	Waylon Jennings
January 27	Tulsa Time	Don Williams
February 3	Your Love Had Taken Me That High	Conway Twitty
February 10	I Really Got the Feeling/Baby I'm Burning	Dolly Parton
February 17	Why Have You Left the One You Left Me For	Crystal Gayle
February 24	Every Which Way but Loose	Eddie Rabbitt
March 3	Every Which Way but Loose	Eddie Rabbitt
March 10	Every Which Way but Loose	Eddie Rabbitt
March 17	Back on My Mind Again	Ronnie Milsap
March 24	You Made My Day Tonight	Canadian Zephyr
March 31	I Just Fall in Love Again	Anne Murray
April 7	I Just Fall in Love Again	Anne Murray
April 14	It's a Cheating Situation	Moe Bandy with Janie Fricke
April 21	Sweet Memories	Willie Nelson
April 28	(If Loving You Is Wrong) I Don't Want to Be Right	Barbara Mandrell
May 5	Where Do I Put Her Memory	Charley Pride
May 12	Where Do I Put Her Memory	Charley Pride
May 19	Don't Take It Away	Conway Twitty
May 26	I'm Getting High Remembering	Carroll Baker
June 2	Sail Away	The Oak Ridge Boys
June 9	Sail Away	The Oak Ridge Boys
June 16	Sail Away	The Oak Ridge Boys
June 23	Sail Away	The Oak Ridge Boys
June 30	Nobody Likes Sad Songs	Ronnie Milsap
July 7	She Believes in Me	Kenny Rogers
July 14	Amanda	Waylon Jennings
July 21	You're the Only One	Dolly Parton
July 28	You're the Only One	Dolly Parton
August 4	Shadows in the Moonlight	Anne Murray
August 11	(Ghost) Riders in the Sky	Johnny Cash
August 18	You're the Only One	Dolly Parton
August 25	You're the Only One	Dolly Parton
September 1	Suspicions	Eddie Rabbitt
September 8	The Devil Went Down to Georgia	Charlie Daniels
September 15	The Devil Went Down to Georgia	Charlie Daniels
September 22	'Til I Can Make it On My Own	Kenny Rogers and Dottie West
September 29	Heartbreak Hotel	Willie Nelson and Leon Russell
October 6	You're My Jamaica	Charley Pride
October 13	I May Never Get To Heaven	Conway Twitty
October 20	Before My Time	John Conlee
October 27	Stolen Moments	R. Harlan Smith and Chris Nielsen
November 3	Dream On	The Oak Ridge Boys
November 10	You Decorated My Life	Kenny Rogers
November 17	You Decorated My Life	Kenny Rogers
November 24	Broken Hearted Me	Anne Murray
December 1	Come with Me	Waylon Jennings
December 8	Half The Way	Crystal Gayle
December 15	I Cheated Me Right Out of You	Moe Bandy
December 22	Whiskey Bent and Hell Bound	Hank Williams, Jr.
December 29	Whiskey Bent and Hell Bound	Hank Williams, Jr.

== See also ==
- 1979 in music
- List of number-one country hits of 1979 (U.S.)
