= List of Hot Country Singles number ones of 1979 =

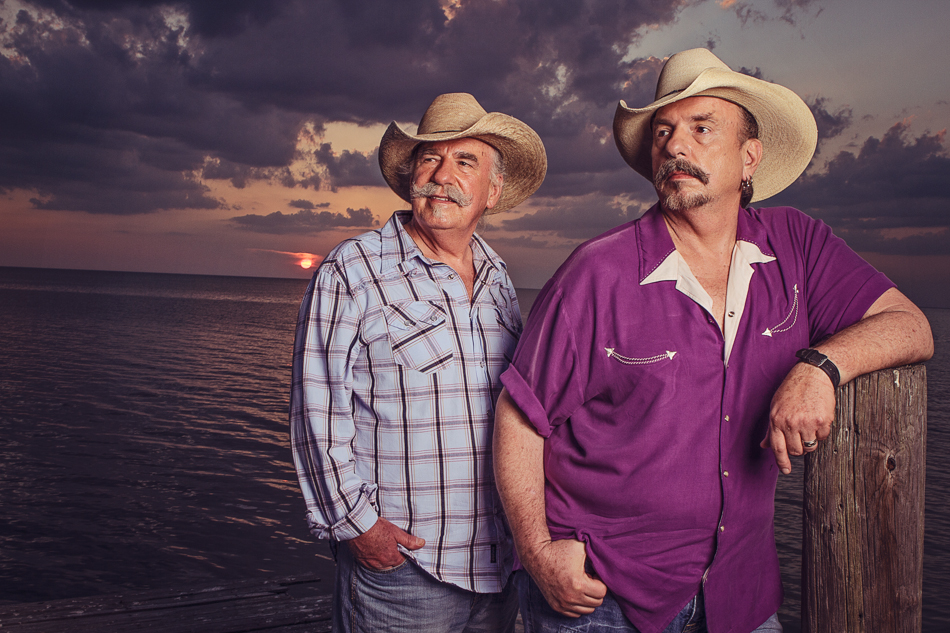
The Bellamy Brothers had their first number-one country single in 1979 with "If I Said You Had a Beautiful Body Would You Hold It Against Me".

Hot Country Songs is a chart that ranks the top-performing country music songs in the United States, published by Billboard magazine. In 1979, 33 different singles topped the chart, which was published at the time under the title Hot Country Singles, in 52 issues of the magazine. Chart placings were based on playlists submitted by country music radio stations and sales reports submitted by stores.

Waylon Jennings, Anne Murray, Kenny Rogers, and Conway Twitty tied for the highest total number of weeks spent at number one in 1979, each spending five weeks at the top of the chart. Jennings, Murray and Twitty each had a run of three consecutive weeks at number one with "Amanda", "I Just Fall in Love Again" and "Happy Birthday Darlin'" respectively. The three songs tied for the longest unbroken run in the top spot during 1979 with "Every Which Way but Loose" by Eddie Rabbitt, "Golden Tears" by Dave & Sugar and "If I Said You Had a Beautiful Body Would You Hold It Against Me" by the Bellamy Brothers, each of which also spent three weeks atop the listing. Murray, Rogers and Twitty each had three number ones in 1979, the most by an individual act.

In January, John Conlee achieved the first of seven number one country singles with "Lady Lay Down"; he would reach number one for the second time in May. Two weeks after Conlee's second number one, the Bellamy Brothers topped the chart for the first time. The brother duo had topped Billboard's all-genres singles chart, the Hot 100, three years earlier with "Let Your Love Flow", but had not previously topped the country listing until the 1979 success of "If I Said You Had a Beautiful Body Would You Hold It Against Me". In August, the Charlie Daniels Band reached number one for the first and only time with "The Devil Went Down to Georgia". The following month Leon Russell made his first appearance at the top of the country chart when he collaborated with Willie Nelson on a cover version of Elvis Presley's 1950s song "Heartbreak Hotel". This was Russell's first song to appear on the country singles chart under the name which he used for the majority of his recording career, although he had previously entered the lower reaches of the chart with two songs released under the alter ego Hank Wilson. The final artist to top the Hot Country chart for the first time in 1979 was Moe Bandy, who achieved his first chart-topper in September when he collaborated with Joe Stampley on the novelty single "Just Good Ol' Boys", before going on to gain a solo number one with "I Cheated Me Right Out of You" in December.

== Chart history ==
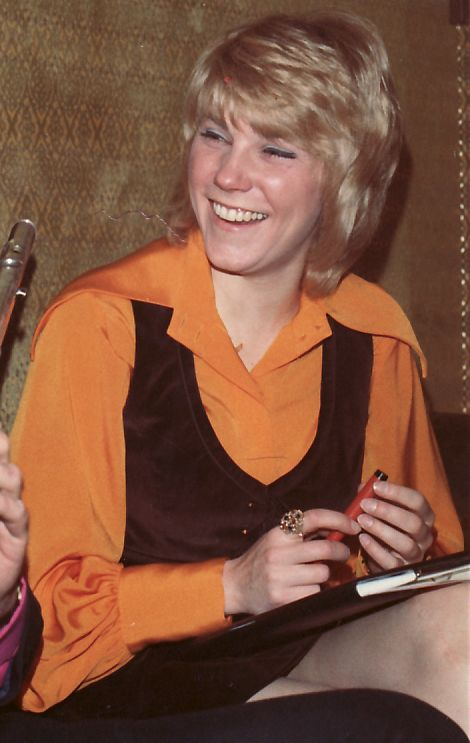
Anne Murray was one of several acts to spend five total weeks at number one in 1979.

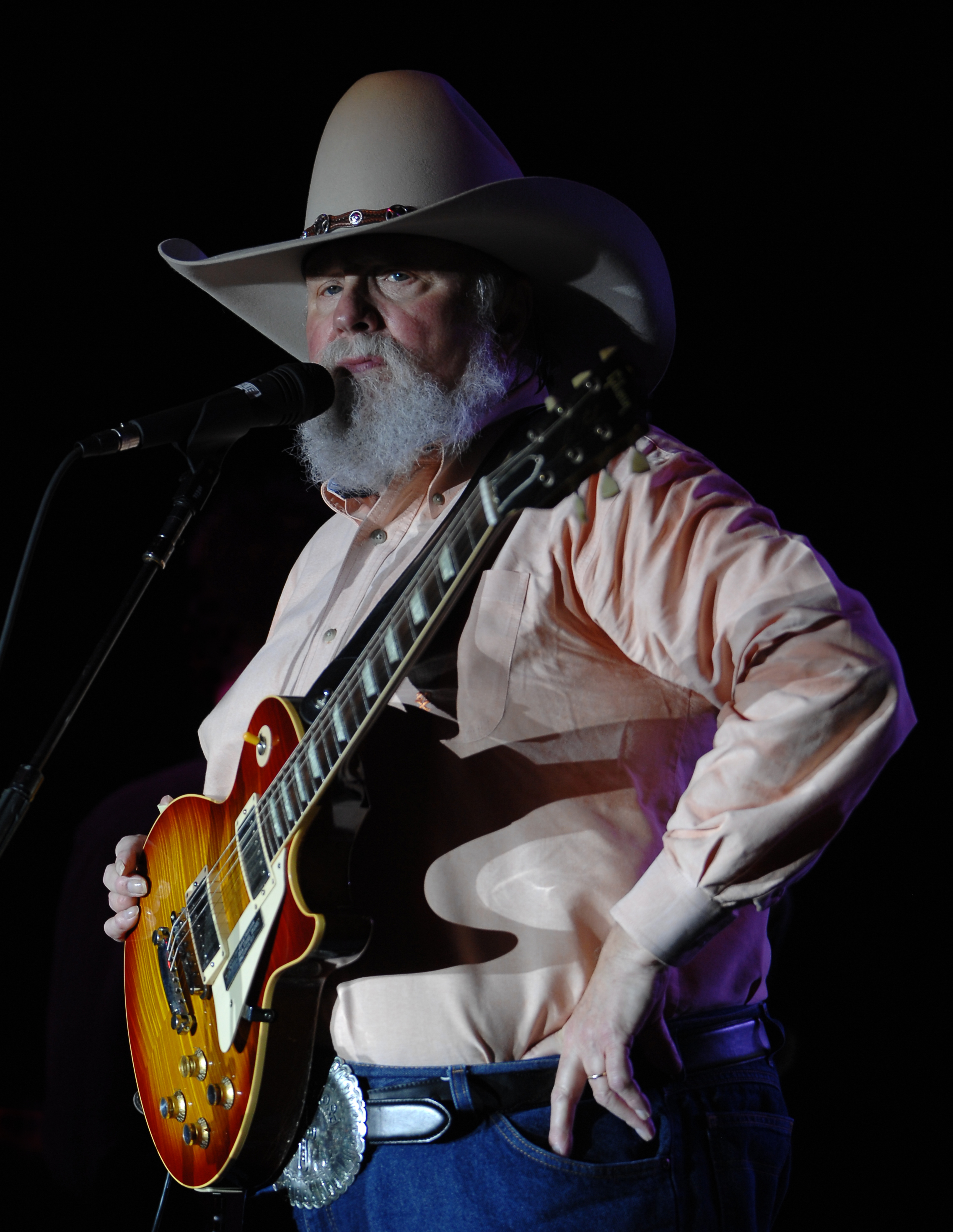
The Charlie Daniels Band (Daniels pictured) topped the chart for the only time in 1979 with "The Devil Went Down to Georgia".

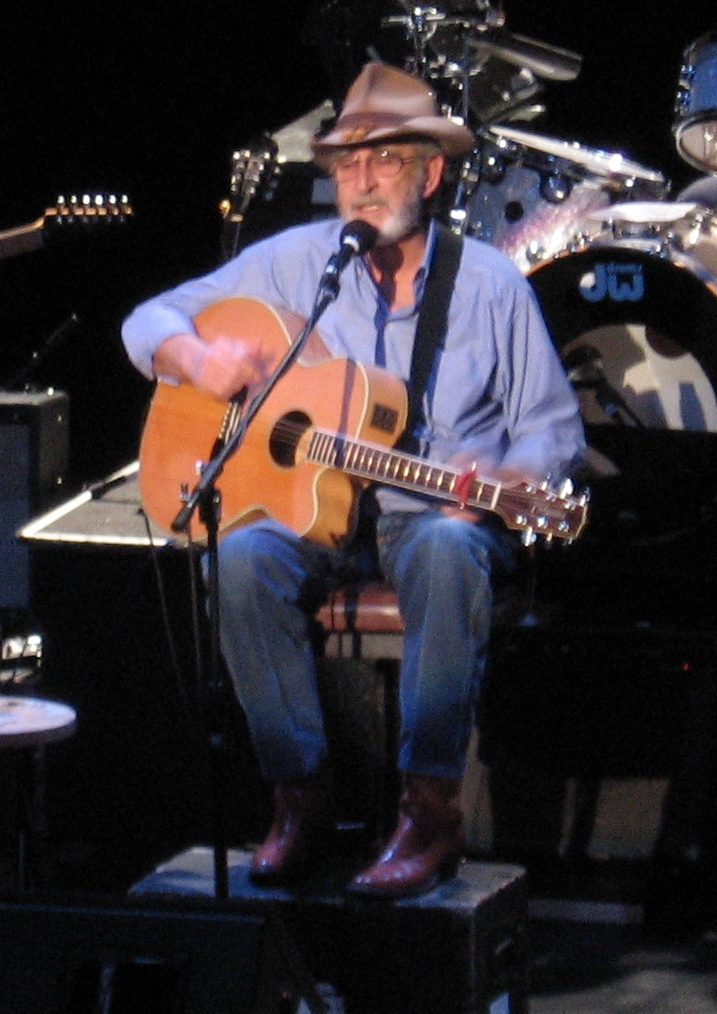
Don Williams had two chart-toppers in 1979.

Issue date	Title	Artist(s)	Ref.
January 6	"Tulsa Time"	Don Williams	
January 13	"Lady Lay Down"	John Conlee	
January 20	"I Really Got the Feeling"/"Baby I'm Burnin'"	Dolly Parton	
January 27	"Why Have You Left the One You Left Me For"	Crystal Gayle	
February 3	"Why Have You Left the One You Left Me For"	Crystal Gayle	
February 10	"Every Which Way but Loose"	Eddie Rabbitt	
February 17	"Every Which Way but Loose"	Eddie Rabbitt	
February 24	"Every Which Way but Loose"	Eddie Rabbitt	
March 3	"Golden Tears"	Dave & Sugar	
March 10	"Golden Tears"	Dave & Sugar	
March 17	"Golden Tears"	Dave & Sugar	
March 24	"I Just Fall in Love Again"	Anne Murray	
March 31	"I Just Fall in Love Again"	Anne Murray	
April 7	"I Just Fall in Love Again"	Anne Murray	
April 14	"(If Loving You Is Wrong) I Don't Want to Be Right"	Barbara Mandrell	
April 21	"All I Ever Need Is You"	Kenny Rogers and Dottie West	
April 28	"Where Do I Put Her Memory"	Charley Pride	
May 5	"Backside of Thirty"	John Conlee	
May 12	"Don't Take It Away"	Conway Twitty	
May 19	"If I Said You Had a Beautiful Body Would You Hold It Against Me"	The Bellamy Brothers	
May 26	"If I Said You Had a Beautiful Body Would You Hold It Against Me"	The Bellamy Brothers	
June 2	"If I Said You Had a Beautiful Body Would You Hold It Against Me"	The Bellamy Brothers	
June 9	"She Believes in Me"	Kenny Rogers	
June 16	"She Believes in Me"	Kenny Rogers	
June 23	"Nobody Likes Sad Songs"	Ronnie Milsap	
June 30	"Amanda"	Waylon Jennings	
July 7	"Amanda"	Waylon Jennings	
July 14	"Amanda"	Waylon Jennings	
July 21	"Shadows in the Moonlight"	Anne Murray	
July 28	"You're the Only One"	Dolly Parton	
August 4	"You're the Only One"	Dolly Parton	
August 11	"Suspicions"	Eddie Rabbitt	
August 18	"Coca-Cola Cowboy"	Mel Tillis	
August 25	"The Devil Went Down to Georgia"	Charlie Daniels Band	
September 1	"Heartbreak Hotel"	Willie Nelson and Leon Russell	
September 8	"I May Never Get to Heaven"	Conway Twitty	
September 15	"You're My Jamaica"	Charley Pride	
September 22	"Just Good Ol' Boys"	Moe Bandy & Joe Stampley	
September 29	"It Must Be Love"	Don Williams	
October 6	"Last Cheater's Waltz"	T.G. Sheppard	
October 13	"Last Cheater's Waltz"	T.G. Sheppard	
October 20	"All the Gold in California"	Larry Gatlin & The Gatlin Brothers	
October 27	"All the Gold in California"	Larry Gatlin & The Gatlin Brothers	
November 3	"You Decorated My Life"	Kenny Rogers	
November 10	"You Decorated My Life"	Kenny Rogers	
November 17	"Come with Me"	Waylon Jennings	
November 24	"Come with Me"	Waylon Jennings	
December 1	"Broken Hearted Me"	Anne Murray	
December 8	"I Cheated Me Right Out of You"	Moe Bandy	
December 15	"Happy Birthday Darlin'"	Conway Twitty	
December 22	"Happy Birthday Darlin'"	Conway Twitty	
December 29	"Happy Birthday Darlin'"	Conway Twitty	

== See also ==
- 1979 in music
- List of artists who reached number one on the U.S. country chart
