= The Hunt (band) =

Canadian rock band

- Origin: Toronto, Ontario, Canada
- Genres: Hard rock, progressive rock,
- Years active: 1977–1984
- Labels: GRT Records; Unidisc Music
- Past members: Paul Dickinson; Paul Cockburn; Paul Kersey; Jacques Harrison; Gerry Mosby; Steve Vaughan; Carl Calvert; Brian Gagnon

The Hunt was a Canadian rock band, mostly made up of musicians who had been members of another Canadian rock band, Dillinger.

== History ==
In 1977, after Dillinger broke up, guitarist Paul Cockburn, drummer and percussionist Paul Kersey (ex Max Webster), keyboard player Jacques Harrison, keyboard player and bass guitarist Gerry Mosby, and guitarist and bass guitarist Brian Gagnon performed together as The Hunt. Most members also sang.

The band released a self-titled album that year through GRT Records in Canada. Like other Toronto bands Moxy, and Garfield The Hunt gained some traction in San Antonio thanks to local DJ Joe Anthony. However, after the debut album the band's popularity waned. Mosby left to play bass guitar for the band Rheingold(with future star Gowan). By 1978, both Harrison and Cockburn had also left. Guitarist Paul Dickinson was added to the lineup, and the group (now a trio of Dickinson, Gagnon and Kersey) issued a second album, Back on the Hunt. The album consisted of mainly heavy rock tracks, and was not well received, particularly in the United States.

Carl Calvert played bass guitar on the album Thrill of the Kill in place of Brian Gagnon. This left drummer Kersey as the only remaining original member.

The song "Little Miss Perfection", from 1977's The Hunt album, received the most radio airplay, primarily in Canada's largest local radio markets, and San Antonio.

After having some success in Canada but not much in the U.S. beside that one Texas city, the group disbanded in 1984.

== Discography ==
- The Hunt (1977)
- Back on the Hunt (1980)
- The Thrill of the Kill (1982)
