= I Just Started Hatin' Cheatin' Songs Today =

Studio album by Moe Bandy
- Released: 1974
- Genre: Country
- Length: 26:30
- Label: GRC (General Recording Corporation)
- Producer: Ray Baker

Moe Bandy chronology
I Just Started Hatin' Cheatin' Songs Today (1974)	It Was Always So Easy (To Find An Unhappy Woman) (1974)

Professional ratings
Review scores
Source	Rating
Christgau's Record Guide	A−

I Just Started Hatin' Cheatin' Songs Today is the first album by country singer Moe Bandy (Marion Franklin Bandy, Jr.). It was released in 1974 on the GRC label.

== Track listing ==
1. "I Just Started Hatin' Cheatin' Songs Today" (A. L. "Doodle" Owens, Sanger D. Shafer) - 2:57
2. "Cowboys and Playboys" (Sanger D. Shafer) - 2:28
3. "How Long Does It Take (To Be a Stranger)" (Dallas Frazier, Sanger D. Shafer) - 1:52
4. "Get All Your love Together (And Come On Home)" (Gene Vowell, A. L "Doodle" Owens, Glenn Sutton) - 2:49
5. "How Far Do You Think We Would Go" (Gene Vowell, A. L. "Doodle" Owens) - 2:47
6. "Smoke Filled Bar" (Ginger Boatwright) - 3:10
7. "This Time I Won't Cheat on Her Again" (A. L. "Doodle" Owens, Dallas Frazier) - 2:30
8. "Home Is Where The Hurt Is" (A. L. "Doodle" Owens) - 2:31
9. "I Wouldn't Cheat on Her If She Was Mine" (Paul Huffman, Joane Keller, Bucky Jones) - 2:31
10. "Honky Tonk Amnesia" (Sanger D. Shafer, A. L. "Doodle" Owens) - 2:33

== Production ==
- Sound Engineer - Lou Bradley
- Album Graphics - Pinwheel Studios
- Cover Photo - Bob Jones, Pinwheel Studios
- Graphic Production - Bill Ward

== Charts ==
Chart performance for I Just Started Hatin' Cheatin' Songs Today
Chart (1974)	Peak position
US Top Country Albums (Billboard)	11
