= It Was Always So Easy (To Find an Unhappy Woman) =

It Was Always So Easy (To Find An Unhappy Woman)

Studio album by Moe Bandy
- Released: 1974
- Genre: Country
- Length: 26:00
- Label: GRC (General Record Corporation)
- Producer: Ray Baker

Moe Bandy chronology
I Just Started Hatin' Cheatin' Songs Today (1974)	It Was Always So Easy (To Find An Unhappy Woman) (1974)	Bandy the Rodeo Clown (1975)

Professional ratings
Review scores
Source	Rating
Christgau's Record Guide	B+

It Was Always So Easy (To Find An Unhappy Woman) is the second album by country singer Moe Bandy (Marion Franklin Bandy, Jr.) released in 1974 on the GRC Label.

== Track listing ==
1. "It Was Always So Easy (To Find an Unhappy Woman)" (Sanger D. "Whitey" Shafer, A. L. "Doodle" Owens) - 2:39
2. "Don't Anyone Make Love at Home Anymore" (Dallas Frazier) - 2:30
3. "Somebody That's Good" (Eddy Raven, Ray Baker) - 2:55
4. "How Can I Get You Out of My Heart (When I Can't Get You Off Of My Mind)" (A. L. "Doodle" Owens) - 2:28
5. "Loving You Was All I Ever Needed" (Stan Kesler, Bobby Wood†) - 2:41
6. "Home in San Antone" (Floyd Jenkins) - 2:14
7. "I'm Looking For a New Way To Love You" (Sanger D. "Whitey" Shafer, Moe Bandy) - 2:37
8. "One Thing Leads To Another" (Eddy Raven) - 3:03
9. "It's Better Than Going Home Alone" (Truman Stearnes, Guy Coleman) - 2:35
10. "I'm Gonna Listen To Me" (Dallas Frazier) - 2:21

†"Loving You Was All I Ever Needed" was attributed to Dallas Frazier on the album cover, but to Stan Kesler and Bobby Wood on the record label.

== Musicians ==
- Steel Guitar - Weldon Myrick
- Fiddle (& Mandolin on track 6) - Johnny Gimble
- Piano - Hargus "Pig" Robbins
- Drums - Kenny Malone
- Bass - Bob Moore
- Guitar - Dave Kirby
- Rhythm Guitar - Chip Young, Ray Edenton, Bob Thompson
- Everything - Charlie McCoy

=== Backing vocals ===
The Jordanaires

== Production ==
- Sound engineer - Lou Bradley
- Photography - Herb Burnett, Pinwheel Studios

== Charts ==
Chart performance for It Was Always So Easy (To Find an Unhappy Woman)
Chart (1975)	Peak position
US Top Country Albums (Billboard)	9
