= Starting Over Again (Dolly Parton song) =

1980 Dolly Parton song

Single by Dolly Parton

from the album Dolly, Dolly, Dolly
- B-side: "Sweet Agony"
- Released: February 25, 1980
- Recorded: December 1979
- Genre: Country pop
- Length: 3:58
- Label: RCA
- Songwriters: Donna Summer, Bruce Sudano
- Producer: Gary Klein

Dolly Parton singles chronology
"Sweet Summer Lovin'" (1979)	"Starting Over Again" (1980)	"Old Flames Can't Hold a Candle to You" (1980)

"Starting Over Again" is a song recorded by American entertainer Dolly Parton. The song was written by Donna Summer and her husband Bruce Sudano. Parton's recording was performed as a slow tempo ballad, gradually building to a dramatic crescendo. It was released in February 1980 as the first single from her album Dolly, Dolly, Dolly. "Starting Over Again" made the U.S. pop top forty, peaking at number 36, and reached number 1 on the Billboard Hot Country Songs chart on May 24, 1980, becoming Parton's 12th number one and making Summer first ever Black woman to write or co-write a song which reached number 1 on this chart.

Donna Summer performed it live numerous times on television specials during the 1980s, including her own program, The Donna Summer Special. A studio version of the track has yet to surface.

== Content ==
The song tells the story of a middle-aged couple separating after 30 years of marriage. It was based upon the divorce of Sudano's parents.

== Chart history ==
Weekly

Chart (1980)	Peak position
US Hot Country Songs (Billboard)	1
US Billboard Hot 100	36
US Adult Contemporary (Billboard)	35
Canadian RPM Country Tracks	2

Year-end

Chart (1980)	Position
US Hot Country Songs (Billboard)	22

== Reba McEntire cover ==
"Starting Over Again"

Single by Reba McEntire

from the album Starting Over
- B-side: "I Won't Mention It Again"
- Released: 1996
- Recorded: 1995
- Genre: Country
- Length: 4:07
- Label: MCA Nashville
- Songwriters: Donna Summer, Bruce Sudano
- Producers: Tony Brown, Reba McEntire

Reba McEntire singles chronology
"Ring on Her Finger, Time on Her Hands" (1995)	"Starting Over Again" (1996)	"You Keep Me Hangin' On" (1996)

Reba McEntire also covered the song in 1995 for her Starting Over album. Released as the album's third single, McEntire's version peaked at number 19 on the Hot Country Singles & Tracks chart. In the album's liner notes, McEntire wrote that she chose to cover the song as a tribute to Parton and Summer, both artists whom she'd admired.

=== Chart history ===
Chart (1996)	Peak position
Canada Country Singles (RPM)	26
US Hot Country Songs (Billboard)	19
