= Come to My Love =

Single by Cristy Lane

from the album Simple Little Words
- B-side: "Love Lies"
- Released: November 1979
- Recorded: October 1979
- Studio: LSI Studio
- Genre: Country; country pop
- Length: 2:30
- Label: United Artists
- Songwriters: Sam Lorber; Jeff Silbar
- Producer: Charlie Black

Cristy Lane singles chronology
"Slippin' Up, Slippin' Around" (1979)	"Come to My Love" (1979)	"One Day at a Time" (1980)

"Come to My Love" is a song composed by Sam Lorber and Jeff Silbar. It was first recorded by American Christian and country music singer Cristy Lane. In 1979, it was released as a single via United Artists Records and became a major hit single on the American country chart. The song was later released Lane's 1979 studio record titled Simple Little Words.

== Background, release and chart performance ==
Originally recording for her husband's independent record label, Cristy Lane had several hit singles before switching to United Artists Records in 1979. She would have further success as a country music artist with the label. Lane recorded her next single release in October 1978 at LSI Studios, located in Nashville, Tennessee. The recording session was produced by Charlie Black, who had previously produced Lane's earlier singles. "Come to My Love" was composed by Sam Lorber and Jeff Silbar.

"Come to My Love" was first released on Lane's 1978 album titled Love Lies. However, it was not issued as a single. It was then re-released as a single in November 1979 on United Artists Records. It was Lane's second single released with the label and was backed on the flip side by the track "Love Lies". The song became a major hit in the United States after reaching number 16 on the Billboard Hot Country Songs chart. In Canada, the song reached number 35 on the RPM Country Tracks chart. "Slippin' Up, Slippin' Around" was released on Lane's 1979 studio album titled Simple Little Words, her first album for United Artists.

== Track listing ==
7" vinyl single

- "Come to My Love" – 2:30
- "Love Lies" – 3:16

== Charts ==
Chart (1979–80)	Peak position
Canada Country Songs (RPM)	35
US Hot Country Singles (Billboard)	16
