= Guess I Went Crazy =

Single by Canadian Zephyr

from the album Zephyr
- Released: 1980
- Genre: Country
- Label: RCA

Canadian Zephyr singles chronology
"Don't Ask the Question" (1979)	"Guess I Went Crazy" (1980)	"The Time It Takes to Leave" (1980)

"Guess I Went Crazy" is a single by Canadian country music group Canadian Zephyr. Released in 1980, it was a single from their album Zephyr. The song reached number one on the RPM Country Tracks chart in Canada in October 1980.

== Charts ==
Chart (1980)	Peak position
Canadian RPM Country Tracks	1
