= Dolly, Dolly, Dolly =

Studio album by Dolly Parton
- Released: April 14, 1980
- Recorded: December 1979
- Studio: Sound Labs (Hollywood)
- Genres: Country; pop
- Length: 34:33
- Label: RCA Victor
- Producer: Gary Klein

Dolly Parton chronology
Great Balls of Fire (1979)	Dolly, Dolly, Dolly (1980)	Porter & Dolly (1980)

Singles from Dolly, Dolly, Dolly
- 1. "Starting Over Again" Released: March 3, 1980; 2. "Old Flames Can't Hold a Candle to You" Released: June 23, 1980

Dolly, Dolly, Dolly is a studio album by American singer-songwriter Dolly Parton. It was released on April 14, 1980, by RCA Victor. The album's two singles, "Starting Over Again" and "Old Flames Can't Hold a Candle to You" both topped the Billboard Hot Country Singles chart. The album peaked at number seven on the Billboard Hot Country LPs chart. The album is generally regarded by critics, as well as Parton's fans, as one of the least satisfying albums of her career, partially because it does not include any of her own compositions.

== Critical reception ==
Professional ratings
Review scores
Source	Rating
AllMusic	3/5 stars
The Encyclopedia of Popular Music	2/5 stars

Billboard gave a mixed review of the album, calling it "another set of varied Parton vocals," while noting that Klein's production puts emphasis on piano and percussion. They went on to say that "the frenetic up-tempo songs provide balance in pacing, but Parton's strength remains soft, powerful ballads—the type of song she used to write. Unfortunately, the LP carries no Parton-written songs." They closed by saying that they hope the lack of songs written by Parton is "only a temporary development in the career of this outstanding writer-performer."

The album received a positive review from Cashbox, saying that "Parton comes out with a very smooth LP in a very slick and classy package." Although, they also noted that Parton "didn’t write a single tune," they felt that "every cut is high quality with a nice mixture of ballads and up tempo numbers." They concluded the review by saying, "There's something for everyone here."

== Track listing ==
Side one
No.	Title	Writer(s)	Length
1.	"Starting Over Again"	Donna Summer, Bruce Sudano	3:58
2.	"Same Old Fool"	Glenn Sutton, Greg Leroy, Jim Helmer	3:20
3.	"Old Flames Can't Hold a Candle to You"	Pebe Sebert, Hugh Moffatt	3:24
4.	"You're the Only One I Ever Needed"	Robbie Patton, Linda Mallah	3:00
5.	"Say Goodnight"	Gary Portnoy, Susan Sheridan	4:04

Side two
No.	Title	Writer(s)	Length
1.	"Fool for Your Love"	Michael Omartian, Leo Sayer	3:06
2.	"Even a Fool Would Let Go"	Tom Snow, Kerry Chater	3:18
3.	"Sweet Agony"	David Wolfert, Susan Sheridan	3:43
4.	"I Knew You When"	Rupert Holmes	3:10
5.	"Packin' It Up"	Sandy Farina, Lisa Ratner	3:30

== Chart performance ==
Chart (1980)	Peak position
Canadian Country Albums (RPM)	1
US Billboard 200	71
US Top Country Albums (Billboard)	7
US Cashbox Country Albums	7
US Cash Box Top Albums	103

== Personnel ==
- Jeff Porcaro – drums
- Anita Ball – vocals
- Jeff Baxter – guitar
- George Bohanon – horn
- Alexandra Brown – vocals
- Lenny Castro – percussion
- Steve Cropper – guitar
- Nick DeCaro – string & vocal arranger
- Denise DeCaro – background vocals & vocal contractor
- Frank DeCaro – music contractor
- Richard Dennison – vocals
- Nathan East – bass guitar
- Chuck Findley – horn
- Roy Galloway – vocals
- Gary Grant – horn
- Jay Graydon – guitar
- William "Bill" Greene – vocals
- Gary Herbig – horn
- Jim Horn – horn
- Dick Hyde – trombone
- Abraham Laboriel – bass guitar
- Albert Lee – guitar
- Joe McGuffee – guitar
- Terry McMillan – harmonica
- Gene Morford – vocals
- Ron Oates – keyboards
- Dolly Parton – vocals
- Gregg Perry – piano
- Jim Salestrom – vocals
- Tom Saviano – horn
- Tom Scott – horn
- Michael Severs – guitar
- Leland Sklar – bass guitar
- Buddy Spicher – violin
- Stephanie Spruill – vocals
- Fred Tackett – guitar
- Red Young – keyboards
- Myrna Matthews – vocals
- Marti McCall – vocals
