= Cross Winds =

Studio album by Conway Twitty
- Released: 1979
- Recorded: 1979
- Genre: Country
- Label: MCA Records
- Producer: Conway Twitty, David Barnes

Conway Twitty chronology
Conway (1978)	Cross Winds (1979)	Heart & Soul (1980)

Singles from Cross Winds
- 1. "Don't Take It Away" Released: March 1979; 2. "I May Never Get to Heaven" Released: July 1979; 3. "Happy Birthday Darlin'" Released: October 3, 1979

Cross Winds is the 40th studio album by American country music singer Conway Twitty. The album was released in 1979 by MCA Records.

== Track listing ==
No.	Title	Writer(s)	Length
1.	"Don't Take It Away"	Troy Seals, Max D. Barnes	3:40
2.	"Heavy Tears"	John Hiatt	2:31
3.	"Love Comin' Down"	Jerry Chesnut	3:17
4.	"I Wish You Could Have Turned My Head (And Left My Heart Alone)"	Sonny Throckmorton	3:55
5.	"Happy Birthday Darlin'"	Chuck Howard	2:50
6.	"I May Never Get to Heaven"	Bill Anderson, Buddy Killen	2:47
7.	"Grand Ole Blues"	Troy Seals, Billy Sherrill	4:10
8.	"Draggin' Chains"	Jay Ramsey	2:43
9.	"If You Can't Write the Music"	Ernie Austin, Ramsey	2:44
10.	"Did We Have to Come This Far (To Say Goodbye)"	Dallas Frazier, A.L. "Doodle" Owens	2:43

== Charts ==
=== Weekly charts ===
Chart (1979)	Peak position
US Top Country Albums (Billboard)	11

=== Year-end charts ===
Chart (1979)	Position
US Top Country Albums (Billboard)	44
