= Old Flames Can't Hold a Candle to You =

1978 song by Pebe Sebert and Hugh Moffatt

Single by Joe Sun
- B-side: "(Home Away From Home) I'll Find It Where I Can"
- Released: April 1978
- Recorded: February 1978
- Studio: LSI Recording Studio (Nashville)
- Genre: Country
- Length: 3:12
- Label: Ovation
- Songwriters: Patricia Rose Sebert; Hugh Moffatt
- Producer: Brien Fisher

"Old Flames Can't Hold a Candle to You"

Single by Dolly Parton

from the album Dolly, Dolly, Dolly
- B-side: "I Knew You When"
- Released: June 23, 1980
- Recorded: 1980
- Studio: Sound Labs (Los Angeles)
- Genre: Country
- Length: 3:26
- Label: RCA
- Songwriters: Patricia Rose Sebert; Hugh Moffatt
- Producer: Gary Klein

Dolly Parton singles chronology
"Starting Over Again" (1980)	"Old Flames Can't Hold a Candle to You" (1980)	"9 to 5" (1980)

"Old Flames"

Single by Foster and Allen

from the album The Foster & Allen Selection
- B-side: "Oslo Waltz"
- Released: 1982
- Genre: Country
- Label: Ritz
- Songwriters: Patricia Rose Sebert; Hugh Moffatt
- Producer: Eamonn Campbell

"Old Flames Can't Hold a Candle to You" is a country song written by singer-songwriter Pebe Sebert and Hugh Moffatt. It was a number 14 U.S. country hit for Joe Sun in 1978, and a number 86 hit for Brian Collins the same year. It was later covered by Dolly Parton, who took it to the top of the U.S. country singles charts in August 1980. Parton included her version on her 1980 Dolly, Dolly, Dolly album, and it was released as the album's second single after the success of "Starting Over Again". In 1982, Irish duo Foster and Allen released their version of the song with the shortened title "Old Flames" which reached number 3 in the Irish singles chart. In 2013, Sebert's daughter, Kesha, released an acoustic cover of the song as part of her extended play Deconstructed. A new version featuring Parton is a track on Kesha's 2017 album Rainbow.

== Content ==
In the song, the narrator tells their lover not to feel threatened by past affairs for these "old flames" are in the past and disappear from memory because of the current love.

== Chart performance ==
=== Joe Sun ===
Chart (1978)	Peak position
Canada Country Singles (RPM)	29
US Hot Country Songs (Billboard)	14

=== Brian Collins ===
Chart (1978)	Peak position
US Hot Country Songs (Billboard)	86

=== Dolly Parton ===
Chart (1980)	Peak position
Canada Country Singles (RPM)	2
US Hot Country Songs (Billboard)	1

=== Foster and Allen ===
Chart (1982)	Peak position
Ireland (IRMA)	3
UK Singles (Official Charts)	51
