= Mississippi (Charlie Daniels song) =

Single by Charlie Daniels Band

from the album Million Mile Reflections
- B-side: "Passing Lane"
- Released: September 24, 1979
- Genre: Country rock
- Length: 3:09
- Label: Epic
- Songwriter: Charlie Daniels
- Producer: John Boylan

Charlie Daniels Band singles chronology
"The Devil Went Down to Georgia" (1979)	"Mississippi" (1979)	"Behind Your Eyes" (1979)

"Mississippi", is a song written by Charlie Daniels and first released on the Charlie Daniels Band's 1979 album Million Mile Reflections. It was also released as a single in September 1979 as the follow-up to "The Devil Went Down to Georgia." It reached the top 20 on the country singles charts in both the U.S. and Canada.

== Lyrics and music ==
The lyrics of "Mississippi" have the singer thinking about his earlier times in the state of Mississippi. The Clarion-Ledger described the mood of the song as quiet and contemplative. Bill Hance of Gannett News Service described it as a "bluesy ballad" that would appeal to older, more middle-of-the-road listeners than some of Daniels' earlier material.

According to Daniels, the melody he used happened to fit the 4 syllable name "Mississippi" and could have been applied to a different place name with 4 syllables, stating "I coulda made it Cincinnati except they ain't no Spanish moss hangin' from no live oak trees in Cincinnati."

== Critical reception ==
"Mississippi" did not repeat the mainstream success of its predecessor "The Devil Went Down to Georgia" but it was nonetheless a success on the country music charts. It reached #19 on the Billboard Hot Country Songs chart in the U.S. and performed even better on the Canadian country singles chart where it peaked at #3. It was also noted as one of the "1980 Most Performed Songs of the Year" by the BMI Awards.

Billboard chose "Mississippi" as a recommended country music single. Cash Box said that "lush strings and piano, and soft, meandering vocals highlight this song that flows as smooth as the Mississippi." Record World said that compared to its predecessor, the band "slows the pace down with a warm, mellow tune" and that "The band shows its versatility here with a smooth vocal and instrumental style." Gannett contributor Herb Ditzel praised "Mississippi" for expressing how much the singer misses Mississippi without resorting to "fancy guitars, piano or screeching vocals." He refers to "Mississippi" as Daniels' answer to "I Left My Heart in San Francisco." Robert Christgau described it as a "sentimental reminiscence." Music critic Ronald Hawkings criticized the song for being too "saccharine."

"Mississippi" was included on Daniels' 1996 box set The Roots Remain.

On April 25, 1979 – before it was released as a single – Daniels presented a special pressing of the song to Mississippi governor Cliff Finch.

== Chart performance ==
Chart (1979)	Peak position
Billboard Hot Country Singles	19
Canadian RPM Country Tracks	3

== "Passing Lane" ==
The b-side of "Mississippi" was "Passing Lane". Billboard described "Passing Lane" as " a consistently good mix of Southern rock/boogie," praising both the vocals and the instrumentation. Cash Box called it a "kind of redneck blues-rock number" with "a witty lyric hook" and "strong instrumentation." Record World called it a "tale spun over a blockbuster rhythm with nifty basslead duets."
