= Garfield (band) =

Canadian progressive rock band

- Origin: Toronto, Ontario, Canada
- Genres: Progressive rock, Art pop, Folk rock
- Years active: 1970s-1981, 2016-present
- Labels: Mercury Records, Polydor Records
- Past members: Garfield French; Walter Lawrence; Paul O'Donnell; Jacques Fillion; Dennis French; Chip Yarwood; Maris Tora

Garfield was a Canadian progressive rock band based in Toronto, Ontario, in the late 1970s, fronted by vocalist and songwriter Garfield French, and including Walter Lawrence on guitar and electric cello, Paul O'Donnell on guitar, harmonica and banjo, Jacques Fillion on keyboards, Dennis French on drums, Chip Yarwood on flute and keyboards, and Maris Tora on bass guitar. The band received a Juno Award nomination for Most Promising Group at the Juno Awards of 1977.

== History ==
The group was formed in the early 1970s as The Garfield Band by French. The band toured in Southern Ontario, and were signed to Mercury Records after a gig opening for 10cc in Ottawa. At this time, they changed their name from The Garfield Band to Garfield.

The band's debut album Strange Streets, released in 1976 on the Mercury label in the United States and Polydor Records in Canada, was listed in the RPM Top 50 albums that year. The album garnered Canadian radio airplay for the single "Old Time Movies". Garfield supported the album by touring both on their own and as an opening act for Canadian dates by The Doobie Brothers. That year they played at Montreal's Moustache Club for a week, and performed their first show in the United States.

Garfield's second album, Out There Tonight, was released in 1977. It was less successful, leading to conflict with their label, and the band moved to the Capricorn label in the United States, while remaining with Polydor in Canada for their third album Reason to Be in 1979. One more album, Flights of Fantasy, was released in 1981 before the band broke up.

In 2016, French started recording new material under the Garfield name, releasing a new album titled December Roads in late 2016. The album was thematically inspired by the death of French's father, and featured contributions from previous members of the band.

In 2017, Garfield released Lost in the Shoals: Wishbone Studio Recording 1979, an album that the band had recorded in 1979, and was intended to be the follow-up to 1977's Out There Tonight. French also released The Early Days On Wildcat, a compilation of unreleased songs from the band's early days. He also released Sundown, a 30-minute recording of a live performance.

== Discography ==
- Strange Streets (1976)
- Out There Tonight (1977)
- Reason to Be (1979)
- Flights of Fantasy (1981)
- Lost in the Shoals: Wishbone Studio Recordings (2016)
- December Roads (2016)
- The Early Days on Wildcat (2017)
- Sundown (2017)
