= Simple Little Words (song) =

Single by Cristy Lane

from the album Simple Little Words
- B-side: "He Believes in Me"
- Released: March 1979
- Recorded: February 1979
- Studio: LSI Studio
- Genre: Country; country pop
- Length: 3:22
- Label: LS
- Songwriter: Douglas Johnson
- Producer: Charlie Black

Cristy Lane singles chronology
"I Just Can't Stay Married to You" (1978)	"Simple Little Words" (1979)	"Slippin' Up, Slippin' Around" (1979)

"Simple Little Words" is a song written by Douglas Johnson that was originally recorded by American Christian and country music singer Cristy Lane. It was released as a single in 1979 via LS Records and became a top ten hit single on the country charts. The song was later released on Lane's 1979 album of the same name. It received positive reviews from writers and critics.

== Background and recording ==
In the late 1970s, Cristy Lane rose to commercial success in country music after her husband formed his own record label. Her 1977 release titled "Let Me Down Easy" went into the top ten of the country charts and it was followed by several more major hits during the latter half of the decade. Lane recorded her next single release in February 1979 at the LSI Studio located in Nashville, Tennessee. "Simple Little Words" was composed by Douglas Johnson. The session was produced by Charlie Black who had been producing Lane's music since the mid 1970s. During the same session, she also recorded the track "He Believes in Me".

== Release and reception ==
"Simple Little Words" was issued as a single on LS Records in March 1979. It was backed on the flip side by the song "He Believes in Me". It spent multiple weeks charting on the Billboard country songs survey and peaked at number ten. It became Lane's fifth top ten hit on the chart. On Canada's RPM Country Singles chart, the track reached the top 40, peaking at number 26. Lane then signed a recording contract with the later United Artists Records in 1979, which released her 1979 studio album of the same name. "Simple Little Words" received a positive review from Billboard magazine, who named it among its "Top Single Picks". Critics praised Lane's "soft delivery", which added a "nice effect" to the track's "electronic instrumentation".

== Track listing ==
7" vinyl single

- "Simple Little Words" – 3:22
- "He Believes in Me" – 3:42

== Charts ==
Chart (1979)	Peak position
Canada Country Songs (RPM)	26
US Hot Country Singles (Billboard)	10
