= Great Balls of Fire (Dolly Parton album) =

Studio album by Dolly Parton
- Released: May 28, 1979
- Recorded: c. December 1978
- Studios: Sound Lab, Los Angeles; A&M, Los Angeles; Salty Dog, Los Angeles
- Genres: Country; pop
- Length: 34:34
- Label: RCA Victor
- Producers: Dean Parks; Gregg Perry; Dolly Parton (exec.); Charles Koppelman (exec.)

Dolly Parton chronology
Heartbreaker (1978)	Great Balls of Fire (1979)	Dolly, Dolly, Dolly (1980)

Singles from Great Balls of Fire
- 1. "You're the Only One" Released: May 14, 1979; 2. "Great Balls of Fire" Released: August 6, 1979; 3. "Sweet Summer Lovin'" Released: August 6, 1979; 4. "Star of the Show" Released: December 1979

Great Balls of Fire is the twenty-first solo studio album by American singer-songwriter Dolly Parton. It was released on May 28, 1979, by RCA Victor. The album was produced by Dean Parks and Gregg Perry with Parton and Charles Koppelman serving as executive producers. The album peaked at number four on the Billboard Top Country Albums chart and number 40 on the Billboard 200. Two of the album's four singles charted in the top ten of the Billboard Hot Country Songs chart. "You're the Only One" topped the chart, while "Sweet Summer Lovin'" peaked at number seven. The album has been certified Gold in the United States.

== Content ==
The album includes four Parton compositions. There are two covers on the album: "Great Balls of Fire", the Jerry Lee Lewis hit from 1957; and a bluegrass-inspired recording of the Beatles hit "Help!"

== Release and promotion ==
The album was released May 28, 1979 on LP, 8-track, and cassette.

=== Singles ===
The album's first single, "You're the Only One", was released in May 1979. It peaked at number one on the Billboard Hot Country Songs chart, Parton's eleventh song to do so. It also peaked at number 14 on the Billboard Adult Contemporary chart, and number 59 on the Billboard Hot 100. The song was also a hit in Canada, peaking at number one on both the RPM Country Singles chart and the RPM Adult Contemporary chart. It peaked at number 63 on the RPM Top Singles chart. The single peaked at number 33 in Australia on the Kent Music Report.

The second and third singles, "Great Balls of Fire" and "Sweet Summer Lovin'", were released as a double A-side in August 1979. "Great Balls of Fire" was aimed at pop radio and failed to chart on its own. Its only chart appearance was on the Billboard Hot Country Songs chart, where it charted as the flip-side of "Sweet Summer Lovin". "Sweet Summer Lovin'" was released to country radio and it peaked at number 7 on the Billboard Hot Country Songs chart. It also peaked at number 47 on the Billboard Adult Contemporary chart and number 77 on the Billboard Hot 100. "Sweet Summer Lovin'" was also a hit in Canada, peaking at number six on the RPM Country Singles chart and number eight on the RPM Adult Contemporary chart.

The fourth single, "Star of the Show", was released in December 1979 in Australia, New Zealand, and the Netherlands. It peaked at number 99 in Australia on the Kent Music Report.

== Critical reception ==
Professional ratings
Review scores
Source	Rating
AllMusic	3.5/5 stars
The Encyclopedia of Popular Music	2/5 stars

The album received a positive review from Billboard, which said that "Parton has now firmly established herself in the pop field and reinforces her universal appeal with a collection of songs that showcase her versatility." They added that Parton's "sweet vocals" were aided by "a conglomeration of stellar players" that give the music a "needed punch." The review named "You're the Only One", "Help!", "Star of the Show", and "Do You Think That Time Stands Still" as the best cuts on the album and noted that the album's "attractive packag[ing] is a sales stimulant."

Cashbox also gave a positive review of the album, saying that "Dolly proves how evocative she is on her latest RCA release." The review went on to say that Parton "lends her feathery voice to some thought-provoking love ballads, good time country numbers, streamlined rockers, and even throws in a dancin' number." The review concluded by saying that the "countrified version" of "Help!" and "knockout ballad" "Do You Think That Time Stands Still" are the standout cuts on the album.

The New York Times determined that the album "isn't even an instance any more of a great talent being slicked up and distorted... It's just trivial in the most depressing sort of way."

Writing for AllMusic, Mark Deming felt that "considering how well (and how sympathetically) Parton produced herself on her last few pre-crossover efforts...Dean Parks and Gregg Perry's studio settings [are] a bit disconcerting," but "they thankfully seem aware at all times who is in the spotlight, and Dolly, professional that she is, rises to the challenge on all ten tracks." He also noted that there are only four Parton compositions on the album and said that "it seems ironic that the most purely country cut on the LP is a cover of the Beatles' "Help!," which is given a sprightly neo-bluegrass arrangement."

== Commercial performance ==
The album debuted at number 19 on the Billboard Top Country Albums chart dated June 23, 1979. It would peak at number four on the chart dated July 28, where it would remain for five non-consecutive weeks. The album charted for a total of 26 weeks. It also peaked at number 40 on the Billboard 200. In Canada, the album peaked at number one on the RPM Country Albums chart and number 28 on the Top Albums chart. The album also peaked at number 48 in Australia on the Kent Music Report.

The album was certified Gold by the Recording Industry Association of America on November 13, 1979.

== Reissues ==
The album was reissued on CD for the first time in February 2007, paired with her 1980 album Dolly, Dolly, Dolly. It was made available as a digital download in March 2007.

== Track listing ==
Side one
No.	Title	Writer(s)	Length
1.	"Star of the Show"	Dolly Parton	3:56
2.	"Down"	Parton	3:35
3.	"You're the Only One"	Carole Bayer Sager; Bruce Roberts	3:23
4.	"Help!"	John Lennon; Paul McCartney	2:45
5.	"Do You Think That Time Stands Still"	Parton	3:56

Side two
No.	Title	Writer(s)	Length
1.	"Sweet Summer Lovin'"	Bud Reneau; Blaise Totsi	3:17
2.	"Great Balls of Fire"	Otis Blackwell; Jack Hammer	3:51
3.	"Almost in Love"	Dean Parks; Doug Thiele	3:15
4.	"It's Not My Affair Anymore"	Jeanne French	3:17
5.	"Sandy's Song"	Parton	3:17

== Charts ==
=== Weekly charts ===
Chart (1979)	Peak position
Australia (Kent Music Report)	48
Canada Country Albums (RPM)	1
Canada Top Albums (RPM)	28
US Billboard 200	40
US Top Country Albums (Billboard)	4
US Cashbox Country Albums	2
US Cash Box Top Albums	79

=== Year-end charts ===
Chart (1979)	Peak position
US Hot Country Albums (Billboard)	34

== Certifications ==
Certifications for "Great Balls of Fire"
Region	Certification	Certified units/sales
United States (RIAA)	Gold	500,000^{^}
^{^} Shipments figures based on certification alone.

== Personnel ==
Adapted from the album liner notes.

Performance

- Anita Ball – backing vocals ("Star of the Show", "Do You Think That Time Stands Still" and "It's Not My Affair Anymore")
- Lenny Castro – conga
- Quitman Dennis – horns
- Richard Dennison – backing vocals ("Star of the Show", "Do You Think That Time Stands Still" and "It's Not My Affair Anymore")
- Earle Dumler – English horn
- Chuck Findley – horns
- David Foster – keyboards ("Star of the Show" and "Almost in Love")
- Roy Galloway – background vocals ("Star of the Show" and "Down")
- David Grisman – mandolin
- Gary Herbig – horns
- Jim Horn – horns
- Jim Keltner – drums, percussion
- Abraham Laboriel – bass
- Joe McGuffee – steel guitar
- Michael Omartian – keyboards ("You're the Only One", "Do You Think That Time Stands Still" and "It's Not My Affair Anymore")
- Carol Carmichael Parks – backing vocals ("You're the Only One", "Sweet Summer Lovin'", "Almost in Love" and "It's Not My Affair Anymore")
- Dean Parks – guitars, alto flute, synthesizer
- Dolly Parton – lead vocals
- Bill Payne – keyboards ("Down", "Help!", "Great Balls of Fire" and "Sandy's Song")
- Herb Pedersen – banjo, backing vocals ("Help!)
- Gregg Perry – piano ("Star of the Show" and "Almost in Love"), synthesizer
- Dorothy Remsen – harp
- Ricky Skaggs – backing vocals ("Help!")
- Stephanie Spruill – acoustic guitar, tambourine, backing vocals ("Star of the Show" and "Down")
- Julia Waters – backing vocals ("Star of the Show" and "Down")
- Maxine Waters – backing vocals ("Star of the Show" and "Down")

Production

- Harry Bluestone – concertmaster
- Frank DeCaro – contractor
- Linda Gerrity – production coordinator
- Bernie Grundmann – mastering engineer
- Jim Horn – horn arrangements
- Charles Koppelman – executive producer
- Dean Parks – producer, rhythm arrangements, string arrangements ("Almost in Love"), horn arrangements
- Dolly Parton – executive producer
- Gregg Perry – producer, string arrangements ("You're the Only One", "Do You Think That Time Stands Still" and "Sandy's Song"), horn arrangements
- Eric Prestidge – engineer
- Sid Sharp – concertmaster
- Linda Tyler – recording assistant (Sound Labs, Inc.)

Other personnel

- Nancy Atkins – A&R coordination
- Ed Caraeff – art direction, photography, album design
