= Slippin' Up, Slippin' Around =

Single by Cristy Lane

from the album Simple Little Words
- B-side: "He's Back in Town"
- Released: July 1979
- Recorded: 1979
- Studio: LSI Studio
- Genre: Country; country pop
- Length: 2:46
- Label: United Artists
- Songwriters: Terry Woodford; Barbara Wyrick
- Producer: Charlie Black

Cristy Lane singles chronology
"Simple Little Words" (1979)	"Slippin' Up, Slippin' Around" (1979)	"Come to My Love" (1979)

"Slippin' Up, Slippin' Around" is a song composed by Terry Woodford and Barbara Wyrick. It was first recorded by American Christian and country music singer Cristy Lane. In 1979, it was released as a single via United Artists Records and became a major hit single on the American country chart. The song was later released Lane's 1979 studio record titled Simple Little Words.

== Background, release and chart performance ==
After several years of having commercial country music success on the independent LS Records, Cristy Lane signed with United Artists Records in 1979. At the label, she would have several successful country single releases. Lane recorded her next single release in 1979 at LSI Studios, located in Nashville, Tennessee. The recording session was produced by Charlie Black, who had previously produced Lane's earlier singles. The song was composed by Terry Woodford and Barbara Wyrick. Wyrick had recently signed a songwriting contract prior to the recording of Lane's song.

"Slippin' Up, Slippin' Around" was released as a single in July 1979 on United Artists Records. It was Lane's first single with the label and was backed on the flip side by the track "He's Back in Town". The song became a major hit in the United States after reaching number 17 on the Billboard Hot Country Songs chart. In Canada, the song reached number 22 on the RPM Country Tracks chart. "Slippin' Up, Slippin' Around" was released on Lane's 1979 studio album titled Simple Little Words, her first album for United Artists.

== Track listing ==
7" vinyl single

- "Slippin' Up, Slippin' Around" – 2:46
- "He's Back in Town" – 3:41

== Charts ==
Chart (1979)	Peak position
Canada Country Songs (RPM)	22
US Hot Country Singles (Billboard)	17
