= It's a Cheating Situation =

Single by Moe Bandy with Janie Fricke

from the album It's a Cheating Situation
- B-side: "Try My Love on for Size"
- Released: January 1979
- Genre: Country
- Label: Columbia
- Songwriters: Curly Putman; Sonny Throckmorton

Moe Bandy singles chronology
"Two Lonely People" (1978)	"It's a Cheating Situation" (1979)	"Barstool Mountain" (1979)

"It's a Cheating Situation" is a song recorded by American country music artists Moe Bandy and Janie Fricke. It was released in January 1979 as the first single and title track from Bandy's album It's a Cheating Situation. The song peaked at number 2 on the Billboard Hot Country Singles chart. It also reached number 1 on the RPM Country Tracks chart in Canada. The song was written by Sonny Throckmorton and Curly Putman.

== Charts ==
=== Weekly charts ===
Chart (1979)	Peak position
US Hot Country Songs (Billboard)	2
Canadian RPM Country Tracks	1

=== Year-end charts ===
Chart (1979)	Position
US Hot Country Songs (Billboard)	40
