= Sweet Summer Lovin' =

Single by Dolly Parton

from the album Great Balls of Fire
- B-side: "Great Balls of Fire"
- Released: August 6, 1979
- Recorded: 1978
- Genre: Country
- Length: 3:17
- Label: RCA
- Songwriters: Bud Reneau; Blaise Tosti
- Producers: Dean Parks; Gregg Perry

Dolly Parton singles chronology
"You're The Only One" (1979)	"Sweet Summer Lovin'" (1979)	"Starting Over Again" (1980)

"Sweet Summer Lovin'" a song written by Bud Reneau and Blaise Tosti, and recorded by American entertainer Dolly Parton. It was released in August 1979 as the second single from the album Great Balls of Fire. "Sweet Summer Lovin'" reached number 7 on the U.S. country charts. (It was the first Dolly Parton single in two years not to top the charts.) It also topped the charts in Yugoslavia.

Though not a double-A-sided single, per se, the flip side, Parton's cover of "Great Balls of Fire", did receive a modest amount of radio airplay during the single's chart tenure.

== Chart performance ==
Chart (1979)	Peak position
US Hot Country Songs (Billboard)	7
US Billboard Hot 100	77
US Adult Contemporary (Billboard)	41
Canadian RPM Country Tracks	6
Canadian RPM Adult Contemporary Tracks	8
Yugoslavian Singles Chart	1
