= Million Mile Reflections =

Studio album by the Charlie Daniels Band
- Released: April 20, 1979
- Studios: Woodland (Nashville, Tennessee)
- Length: 37:27
- Label: Epic
- Producer: John Boylan

The Charlie Daniels Band chronology
Midnight Wind (1977)	Million Mile Reflections (1979)	Full Moon (1980)

Singles from Million Mile Reflections
- 1. "The Devil Went Down to Georgia" Released: May 21, 1979; 2. "Mississippi" Released: September 24, 1979; 3. "Behind Your Eyes" Released: 1979

Million Mile Reflections is the tenth studio album by Charlie Daniels and the seventh as the Charlie Daniels Band, released on April 20, 1979. It is best known for the hit single "The Devil Went Down to Georgia". The title refers to the band having passed the million mile mark in its touring. The song "Reflections" is a tribute to Elvis Presley, Janis Joplin, and Ronnie Van Zant. Daniels dedicated the album to Van Zant, who was killed in the CV-240 plane crash on October 20, 1977.

Million Mile Reflections emerged as the band's most commercially successful album, achieving triple-platinum certification in the US and reaching the position of number five on the Billboard Top LPs chart. It also reached number one on the Top Country Albums chart.

== Critical reception ==
Professional ratings
Review scores
Source	Rating
AllMusic	3/5 stars
Christgau's Record Guide	C
The Rolling Stone Album Guide	3/5 stars
Shreveport Journal	B

The Shreveport Journal wrote that Daniels's "lyrics sometimes seem awkward [and] out of synch." Record World said of the single "Behind Your Eyes" that "the hit-bound ballad features shimmering keyboards and a lyrical guitar run."

== Track listing ==
All songs composed by the Charlie Daniels Band (Charlie Daniels, Tom Crain, Taz DiGregorio, Fred Edwards, Charles Hayward & James W. Marshall), except where indicated:

1. "Passing Lane" - 3:17
2. "Blue Star" - 3:40
3. "Jitterbug" (Daniels, Crain, DiGregorio, Edwards, Hayward, Don Murray) - 3:11
4. "Behind Your Eyes" (John Boylan) - 3:56
5. "Reflections" - 5:26
6. "The Devil Went Down to Georgia" - 3:34
7. "Mississippi" (Daniels) - 3:10
8. "Blind Man" (Crain) - 3:46
9. "Rainbow Ride" - 7:24

The 8-track tape running order (Epic JEA 35751) differs from the original LP, as follows:

Program 1: Passing Lane - Blue Star - Jitterbug

Program 2: Reflections - The Devil Went Down to Georgia - Behind Your Eyes (Part 1)

Program 3: Behind Your Eyes (Concl) - Mississippi - Blind Man

Program 4: Rainbow Ride - The Devil Went Down to Georgia (Reprise)*

*"The Devil Went Down to Georgia (Reprise)" is a shorter version of "The Devil Went Down to Georgia" evidenced only by an earlier fade, likely to best program the 8-track tape to minimize a lengthy silent portion of Program 4 and minimize splitting more than one track over the four programs.

== Personnel ==
The Charlie Daniels Band:

- Charlie Daniels - guitar, fiddle, vocals
- Tom Crain - guitar, vocals
- "Taz" DiGregorio - keyboards, vocals
- Fred Edwards - drums, percussion
- Charles Hayward - bass
- James W. Marshall - drums, percussion

Additional personnel:

- Bergen White - string arrangements on tracks 5 and 7
- Lea Jane Singers - background vocals on tracks 3 and 5
- Terry Mead - trumpet on "Jitterbug"

Production

- Producer: John Boylan
- Engineer: Paul Grupp
- Assistant (recording): Steve Goostree
- Mixed at Westlake Sound, Los Angeles, Ca.
- Assistants (mixing): Dave Rideau, Erik Zobler
- Production supervisor: Joseph E. Sullivan
- Cover illustration: Bill Myers
- Cover design: Virginia Team - Wm. J. Johnson

== Catalog number ==
- Original LP Catalog Number: Epic Records JE 35751
- CD Catalog Number: Epic Records EK 35751

== Charts ==
Chart (1979)	Peak position
Australian Albums (Kent Music Report)	77
Canada Top Albums/CDs (RPM)	9
UK Albums (Official Charts)	74
US Billboard 200	5
US Top Country Albums (Billboard)	1

== Certifications ==
Region	Certification	Certified units/sales
Canada (Music Canada)	Platinum	100,000^{^}
United States (RIAA)	3× Platinum	3,000,000^{^}
^{^} Shipments figures based on certification alone.
