= Simple Little Words =

Studio album by Cristy Lane
- Released: September 1979
- Recorded: 1978–1979
- Studio: LSI Studio
- Genres: Country; country pop
- Labels: LS; United Artists
- Producer: Charlie Black

Cristy Lane chronology
| Love Lies (1978) | Simple Little Words (1979) | Ask Me to Dance (1980) |

Singles from Simple Little Words
- 1. "Simple Little Words" Released: March 1979; 2. "Slippin' Up, Slippin' Around" Released: July 1979; 3. "Come to My Love" Released: November 1979

Simple Little Words is a studio album by American Christian and country artist Cristy Lane. It was released in September 1979 via United Artists Records and LS Records. It contained ten tracks. It was the fourth studio effort of Lane's music career and her first with the United Artists label. Simple Little Words produced three singles that became hits on the North American country charts. The album received a positive review following its release.

== Background and content ==
Cristy Lane had recently rose to commercial success prior to the release of Simple Little Words. After her husband (Lee Stoller) established his own recording label, Lane began recording and releasing singles exclusively through the company. Her first several hits on the label brought her to the attention of United Artists Records, which Lane signed with in 1979. Simple Little Words was taken from songs Lane had previously issued on her previous LS album release titled Love Lies. This included the previous LP's title track, "Come to My Love", "He's Back in Town" and "I Just Can't Stay Married to You".

The title track from Simple Little Words, "Slippin' Up Slippin' Around" and "I'm Putting My Heart on the Line" were not previously released and were recorded exclusively for the project. The album contained ten tracks in total. It was recorded between 1978 and 1979 at the LSI Studio, located in Nashville, Tennessee. Sessions were produced by Charlie Black, who had previously recorded Lane's last two LP's. In the album's liner notes, Lane dedicates Simple Little Words to her brother, who was killed following his discharge from the Vietnam War.

== Release and reception ==
Simple Little Words was released in September 1979 on LS Records and United Artists Records. It was Lane's first LP for the label and fourth studio album of her music career. It was originally distributed as a vinyl LP with five tracks on either side of the record. A cassette version was also released with a similar track listing. Simple Little Words was Lane's second album to reach a position on the Billboard country albums chart, peaking at number 38 in 1979. It received a positive review from Billboard magazine, who named it among its "top album picks" in a 1979 issue. "Lane's first album endeavor for her new label finds her in shimmery form, bestowing her fragile lifting vocals on a lightly uptempo variety of tunes," they wrote.

Three singles were released from Simple Little Words. The title track was the first song release from the album and was originally issued on LS Records in March 1979. The song reached number ten on the Billboard Hot Country Songs chart later that year, becoming her fifth top ten hit on the chart. "Slippin' Up Slippin' Around" was issued as the LP's second single via United Artists in July 1979. The song reached number 17 on the Billboard country singles survey in 1979. It was followed by the album's final spawned single. "Come to My Love" would be released in November 1979 on United Artists Records. It reached a peak of 16 on the Billboard country chart in early 1980. In addition, all three singles reached top 40 positions on Canada's RPM Country Songs survey.

== Track listing ==
Side one
| No. | Title | Writer(s) | Length |
|---|---|---|---|
| 1. | "Simple Little Words" | Douglas Johnson | 3:24 |
| 2. | "He's Back in Town Again" | Cristy Lane; Fred Newell | 3:41 |
| 3. | "I'm Putting My Heart on the Line" | Jerry Foster; Bill Rice | 2:44 |
| 4. | "Come to My Love" | Sam Lorber; Jeff Silbar | 2:30 |
| 5. | "I Just Can't Stay Married to You" | Charlie Black; Rory Bourke; Jerry Gillespie | 2:47 |

Side two
| No. | Title | Writer(s) | Length |
|---|---|---|---|
| 1. | "Slippin' Up, Slippin' Around" | Terry Woodford; Barbara Wyrick | 2:46 |
| 2. | "Love Lies" | Black; Skippy Barrett | 3:16 |
| 3. | "Hold On" | Bill Wence | 2:35 |
| 4. | "Give Me Back My Heart" | Black; Bourke; Gillespie | 2:07 |
| 5. | "Rainsong" | Chapin Hartford; Jeff Savasano | 4:02 |

== Personnel ==
All credits are adapted from the liner notes of Simple Little Words.

Musical personnel

- Charlie Black – Background vocals, guitar
- Harold Bradley – Guitar, mandolin
- Susie Callaway – Background vocals
- Jerry Carrigan – Drums
- Johnny Christopher – Guitar
- Rita Figlio – Background vocals
- Don Gant – Background vocals
- Gregg Galbraith – Guitar
- Sonny Garrish – Steel guitar
- Randy Goodrum – Piano
- Jon Goin – Guitar
- The Leah Jane Singers – Background vocals
- Sherri Kramer – Background vocals
- The Shelly Kurland Strings – Strings
- Cristy Lane – Lead vocals
- Mike Lawler – Synthesizer
- Larry Londin – Drums
- Craig Mirijanian – Drums
- Bob Moore – Bass
- Weldon Myrick – Steel guitar
- Fred Newell – Guitar
- Ron Oates – Piano
- Joe Osborn – Bass
- Steve Schaeffer – Bass
- Lisa Silver – Background vocals
- Diane Tidwell – Background vocals
- Chip Young – Guitar

Technical personnel

- Charlie Black – Producer
- Farrell Morris – Percussion
- Lee Stoller – Manager
- Bergen White – String arrangement

== Charts ==
| Chart (1979) | Peak position |
|---|---|
| US Top Country Albums (Billboard) | 38 |

== Release history ==
| Region | Date | Format | Label | Ref. |
|---|---|---|---|---|
| Germany | September 1979 | Vinyl | LS Records; United Artists Records | |
| United Kingdom | September 1979 | Vinyl | LS Records; United Artists Records | |
| United States | September 1979 | Vinyl | LS Records; United Artists Records | |
| United States | September 1979 | Cassette | LS Records; United Artists Records | |
