= You Made My Day Tonight =

Single by Canadian Zephyr

from the album The Best of Canadian Zephyr
- Released: 1978
- Genre: Country
- Label: RCA

Canadian Zephyr singles chronology
"A Country Mile Better" (1978)	"You Made My Day Tonight" (1978)	"Love When It Leaves Here" (1979)

"You Made My Day Tonight" is a single by Canadian country music group Canadian Zephyr. Released in 1978, it was a single from their album The Best of Canadian Zephyr. The song reached number one on the RPM Country Tracks chart in Canada in March 1979.

== Chart performance ==
Chart (1978–1979)	Peak position
Canadian RPM Country Tracks	1
