= R. Harlan Smith =

- Born: Robert Harlan Smith; November 6, 1939 (age 86); Central Butte, Saskatchewan, Canada
- Genres: Country
- Occupations: Singer, record producer
- Years active: 1970s-1980s
- Labels: Royalty Records, GRT

Robert Harlan Smith (born November 6, 1939, in Central Butte, Saskatchewan) is a Canadian country music singer, record producer and record label executive. He is known as a founder of the Canadian country music label Royalty Records, and for his performances and recordings both as a solo artist and as a duo with his wife Chris Nielsen.

He is a two-time Juno Award nominee for Best Country Male Vocalist at the Juno Awards of 1977 and the Juno Awards of 1979, and Smith and Nielsen were nominated together as Best Country Group or Duo at the Juno Awards of 1981. He was inducted into the Canadian Country Music Hall of Fame as a builder in 2005.

== Selected discography ==
- Bob Smith Sings (1970)
- Uptown Country (1972)
- I Remember Love (1973)
- Son of a Country Man (7")(1975)
- The Best of R. Harlan Smith (1975)
- Here Comes Yesterday (1977)
- We've Got the Magic (1978)
- Stolen Moments (1979, with Chris Nielsen)
- Two Stepping Round (7")(1988)
- Original Hits, Original Recordings (2006)
- Song for Shelly (7")
