= Chris Nielsen (singer) =

Canadian country singer (born 1955)

- Born: April 2, 1955 (age 71); Aalborg, Denmark
- Genres: Country
- Occupation: Singer
- Years active: 1970s–1980s

Chris Nielsen (born April 2, 1955) is a Canadian country singer, who recorded both as a solo artist and as a duo with her husband R. Harlan Smith. Her singles included "You Know I Want You", "Baby Pictures", "I'd Love You Like Nobody Dared To", "Everyone's Laughin' But Me" and "Second Chance".

Born in Aalborg, Denmark, Nielsen is a two-time Juno Award nominee for Best Country Female Vocalist at the Juno Awards of 1977 and the Juno Awards of 1978, and a nominee for Most Promising Female Vocalist in 1977, and Smith and Nielsen were nominated together as Best Country Group or Duo at the Juno Awards of 1981.

She also worked as an administrator for Royalty Records, Smith's country music record label.

== Discography ==
- Lady from Virginia (1975)
- Let Me Go Down Easy (1977)
- Chris Nielsen (1979)
- Stolen Moments (1979, with R. Harlan Smith)
- My Way or the Highway (1988)
