= Canadian Zephyr =

Canadian country music group

- Origin: Richmond Hill, Ontario Canada
- Genres: Country
- Years active: 1969-1983
- Labels: Cynda Records; Bronco Records; United Artists; RCA; Artists Alliance
- Past members: John Hayman; Bill Meens; Marty Steiger; Chris Plewes; Garth Bourne; Gord Logan; Joe Linge; Carl Toth; Dario Cingolani; Ron Musselwhite; Frank Shandraw John Howard

Canadian Zephyr was a Canadian country music group. Twenty of their singles made the RPM Country Tracks charts, including the number one singles "You Made My Day Tonight" and "Guess I Went Crazy." They released two albums for United Artists and three albums for RCA.

== Discography ==
=== Albums ===
Year	Album	CAN Country
1973	Bringin' the House Down	—
1974	In the Zephyr Style	—
1976	It Just So Happens	—
1978	A Country Mile Better	20
1979	The Best of Canadian Zephyr	21
1980	Zephyr	2
1983	The Songwriters	—

=== Singles ===
Year	Single	Peak positions	
Year	Single	CAN Country	CAN AC
1972	"Cheap Lowdown Wine"	34	—
1973	"World of Make Believe"	80	—
1973	"My Sweet Caroline"	46	—
1973	"Loving My Lady"	79	—
1974	"Me and the Devil"	32	—
1975	"She Loves Away the Blues"	27	—
1975	"Someone Special"	9	—
1976	"Breaking Up with Brenda"	11	—
1977	"For All I Care"	26	—
1977	"Stop Right There"	23	—
1978	"Here's Your Watch John"	4	—
1978	"A Country Mile Better"	26	—
1978	"You Made My Day Tonight"	1	—
1979	"Love When It Leaves Here"	3	25
1979	"Don't Ask the Question"	4	—
1980	"Guess I Went Crazy"	1	—
1980	"The Time It Takes to Leave"	2	—
1981	"Watching It Die"	16	—
1982	"Took You Back Again"	10	—
1983	"Blonde and Down (From a Rodeo Town)"	35	—
