= I'm Getting High Remembering =

Single by Carroll Baker

from the album If It Wasn't for You
- Released: 1979
- Genre: Country
- Label: RCA
- Songwriter(s): Ray Griff

Carroll Baker singles chronology
"Hooked on a Feeling" (1978)	"I'm Getting High Remembering" (1979)	"Build My Life Around You" (1979)

"I'm Getting High Remembering" is a single by Canadian country music artist Carroll Baker written by Ray Griff. Released in 1979, it was the second single from her 1978 album If It Wasn't for You. The song reached number one on the RPM Country Tracks chart in Canada in May 1979. The song was initially recorded by Narvel Felts in 1976 and then by Bobby Lewis the following year.

== Chart performance ==
Chart (1979)	Peak position
Canadian RPM Country Tracks	1
Canadian RPM Adult Contemporary Tracks	41
