= Happy Birthday Darlin' =

Single by Conway Twitty

from the album Cross Winds
- B-side: "Heavy Tears"
- Released: October 3, 1979
- Recorded: February 28, 1979
- Studio: Woodland (Nashville, Tennessee)
- Genre: Country
- Length: 2:57
- Label: MCA
- Songwriter(s): Chuck Howard
- Producer(s): Conway Twitty, David Barnes

Conway Twitty singles chronology
"I May Never Get to Heaven" (1979)	"Happy Birthday Darlin'" (1979)	"I'd Love to Lay You Down" (1980)

"Happy Birthday Darlin'" is a song written by Chuck Howard, and recorded by American country music artist Conway Twitty. It was released in October 1979 as the third and final single from his album Cross Winds. The song was Twitty's 23rd number one on the country chart as solo artist. The single stayed at number one for three weeks and spent a total of 11 weeks on the country chart.

== Content ==
The song begins with the spoken lyric "Hello, Darlin'," calling back to Twitty's 1970 hit of the same name that starts in the same way. The song otherwise tells a narrative through the eyes of a man who vows to right a number of wrongs in his relationship. Here, instead of giving his wife a present for her birthday, he vows to take some things away, such as suspicion, lonely moments, "so-so kisses" and doubt, replacing them with such things as faith and companionship. In the end, the man confidently says that his wife can tell friends, "He didn’t give me anything but he sure took a lot of things away."

== Chart performance ==
Chart (1979–1980)	Peak position
US Hot Country Songs (Billboard)	1
Canadian RPM Country Tracks	13

=== Year-end charts ===
Chart (1980)	Position
US Hot Country Songs (Billboard)	20
