= The Devil Went Down to Georgia =

1979 single by Charlie Daniels

Single by Charlie Daniels Band

from the album Million Mile Reflections
- B-side: "Rainbow Ride"
- Released: May 21, 1979
- Studio: Woodland (Nashville, Tennessee)
- Genre: Country; Southern rock; bluegrass
- Length: 3:34
- Label: Epic
- Songwriters: Charlie Daniels; Tom Crain; "Taz" DiGregorio; Fred Edwards; Charles Hayward; James W. Marshall
- Producer: John Boylan

Charlie Daniels Band singles chronology
"Trudy" (1978)	"The Devil Went Down to Georgia" (1979)	"Mississippi" (1979)

Music video
- "The Devil Went Down to Georgia" on YouTube

"The Devil Went Down to Georgia" is a song written and recorded by American music group Charlie Daniels Band and released on their 1979 album Million Mile Reflections.

The song is written in the key of D minor. The song's verses are closer to being spoken rather than sung (i.e., recitation), and tell the story of a young man named Johnny, in a variant on the classic deal with the Devil. The performances of the Devil and Johnny are played as instrumental bridges. The song was the band's biggest hit, reaching number 3 on the Billboard Hot 100, prevented from further chart movement by "After the Love Has Gone" by Earth, Wind & Fire and "My Sharona" by the Knack.

A sequel to the song titled "The Devil Comes Back to Georgia" was recorded by Mark O'Connor in 1993 on his album Heroes. Johnny Cash was the lead singer and narrator, Marty Stuart and Travis Tritt sang as Johnny and the Devil, respectively, Charlie Daniels played the Devil's fiddle solo and O'Connor played Johnny's fiddle solo.

In 2026, "The Devil Went Down to Georgia" was selected by the Library of Congress for preservation in the National Recording Registry for its "cultural, historical or aesthetic importance in the nation's recorded sound heritage".

== Background and recording ==
Daniels was inspired to write the song when he realized that the album he and his band was recording was lacking a song that featured fiddle. He wrote the song on the spot at the Woodland Sound Studios where the band was recording.

== Content ==
The song tells a story about the Devil's failure to gain a young man's soul through a fiddle-playing contest. The song begins as a disappointed Devil arrives in Georgia, apparently "way behind" on stealing souls, when he comes upon a young man named Johnny who is playing a fiddle, and quite well. Out of desperation, the Devil, who claims to also be a fiddle player, wagers a fiddle of gold against Johnny's soul to see who is the better fiddler. Although Johnny believes taking the Devil's bet might be a sin, he fearlessly accepts, confidently boasting, "I'm the best that's ever been".

The Devil plays first, backed by a band of demon musicians. When he has finished, Johnny compliments him ("Well, you're pretty good, old son".) and takes his own turn, rendering at least four old-time songs, named (though not played) in the Charlie Daniels Band recording—the third of the four being identified not by title, but by an excerpt of its lyrics:

- "Fire on the Mountain", the name of an early 19th-century fiddle tune, and also the name of Daniels' 1974 album,
- "The House of the Rising Sun", a traditional American Southern folk song,
- "Chicken in the bread pan peckin' out dough", a line famously used in Bob Wills and His Texas Playboys' song "Ida Red", and
- "Granny Will Your Dog Bite".

Realizing he has been defeated, the Devil lays his golden fiddle at Johnny's feet. Johnny then invites the Devil to "c'mon back if y'ever wanna try again" before repeating his claim to be "the best that's ever been".

== Critical reception ==
Cash Box praised the "engaging narrative story line" and said the song has "thundering piano", "screaming fiddle work", "pounding drums and screeching guitar". Record World said that Daniels "administers heavy doses of both [storytelling and fiddle-playing] with producer John Boylan capturing the excitement like no one else can".

In 2024, Rolling Stone ranked the song at number 120 on its 200 Greatest Country Songs of All Time ranking.

== Musical references ==
The ballad's story is a derivative of the traditional deal with the Devil motif. Charlie Daniels has stated in interviews, "I don't know where it came from, but it just did. Well, I think I might know where it came from, it may have come from an old poem called 'The Mountain Whippoorwill' that Stephen Vincent Benét wrote many, many years ago (1925), that I had in high school".

== Personnel ==
- Charlie Daniels – guitar, fiddle, vocals
- Tom Crain – guitar, vocals
- "Taz" DiGregorio – keyboards, vocals
- Fred Edwards – drums, percussion
- James W. Marshall – drums, percussion
- Charles Hayward – bass

== Covers and parodies ==
"The Devil Went Down to Georgia" has been notably covered by artists such as the Levellers, Korn, Nickelback, and Bryan Sutton. The band Primus recorded a cover of the song, accompanied by a stop-motion animated music video directed by Mike Johnson, which appeared on the band's 1998 release Videoplasty.

In 2013, the Boston-based roots rockers Adam Ezra Group recorded a parody version, "The Devil Came Up to Boston", depicting the historic rivalry between the New York Yankees and Boston Red Sox.

A cover of the song is featured in the 2007 video game Guitar Hero III: Legends of Rock, a decision that was criticized by Daniels because the devil may win the contest, which he referred to as "violating the very essence of the song".

== Chart performance ==
The original version of the song spent fourteen weeks on the Hot Country Singles charts in 1979, peaking at number 1 and holding the position for one week. It was the band's only number 1 country hit. It spent two weeks at a peak of number 3 on the Billboard Hot 100. The single was certified Platinum by the RIAA on December 20, 1989, for sales of over one million copies in the United States. In 2003, the song was ranked at number 69 on CMT's 100 Greatest Songs of Country Music, and number 5 on CMT's 20 Greatest Southern Rock Songs in 2006. Since it became available as a download in the digital era, it has also sold 2.49 million digital copies in the US as of November 2019. In June 1998, Epic Records re-released the song to country radio, but accidentally sent out the version in which the line "son of a bitch" was uncensored. This error was quickly corrected, and the song re-entered the country charts at number 62 for the chart dated June 20, 1998. It spent seven weeks on the chart and peaked at number 60.

== Charts ==
=== Weekly charts ===
Chart (1979)	Peak position
Australia (Kent Music Report)	14
Canada Top Singles (RPM)	5
Canada Country Singles (RPM)	1
Ireland (IRMA)	16
Netherlands (Single Top 100)	34
New Zealand (Recorded Music NZ)	13
UK Singles (Official Charts)	14
US Billboard Hot 100	3
US Hot Country Songs (Billboard)	1
US Adult Contemporary (Billboard)	30
US Cash Box Top 100	4

Chart (1998)	Peak position
US Hot Country Songs (Billboard)	60

=== Year-end charts ===
Chart (1979)	Rank
Australia (Kent Music Report)	100
Canada	56
US Billboard Hot 100	50
US Hot Country Songs (Billboard)	41
US Cash Box	49

== Certifications ==
Region	Certification	Certified units/sales
United Kingdom (BPI)	Gold	400,000^{‡}
United States (RIAA)	Platinum	1,000,000^{^}
^{^} Shipments figures based on certification alone.^{‡} Sales+streaming figures based on certification alone.

== Sequels ==
=== The Devil Comes Back to Georgia ===
"The Devil Comes Back to Georgia"

Single by Mark O'Connor featuring Johnny Cash, Charlie Daniels, Marty Stuart and Travis Tritt

from the album Heroes
- B-side: "This Can't Be Love"
- Released: September 14, 1993
- Genre: Bluegrass; country; country rock
- Length: 4:13
- Label: Epic
- Songwriters: Charlie Daniels; Tom Crain; "Taz" DiGregorio; Fred Edwards; Charles Hayward; James W Marshall
- Producers: Mark O'Connor; Jim Ed Norman

In 1993, a sequel to the song, "The Devil Comes Back to Georgia", was released by master violinist Mark O'Connor on his album Heroes. The song featured Daniels on fiddle, with Johnny Cash as the narrator, Marty Stuart as Johnny, and Travis Tritt as the devil. The song peaked at number 54 on Billboard's Hot Country Songs chart in 1994.

In the sequel, the devil, still furious ten years after being beaten, decides to take up Johnny's challenge to "c'mon back if y'ever wanna try again". Johnny is now grown with a wife and infant son, and the devil believes that Johnny's sinful pride will be his undoing, so he takes back the golden fiddle, forcing Johnny to practice with his old fiddle before their rematch – the same one he played when he defeated the devil.

Though the song reiterates Johnny's bold claim that he is "the best that's ever been", the lyrics do not reveal who won the rematch. But in the video, the devil is shown defeated by Johnny again.

=== Johnny Went Down to Hell ===
In 2025, TikTok country musician Thomas Mac released a third song, "Johnny Went Down to Hell", featuring Diana Daw and Philip Bowen playing the fiddles. An AI-generated version of the song was shared online by one of Mac's followers a month prior to his release. The song opens with Johnny's death, learning that his gambling has kept him out of Heaven. He then must face the Devil for a third time with his soul and all of Georgia's final destination at stake. Unlike the sequel, the song ends clearly stating that Johnny has won again, with the line, "the devil ain't beat him yet".

== See also ==
- "Cross Road Blues"
- Faust
- "The Devil and Daniel Webster"
- "The Devil and Tom Walker"
- "The Devil's Dream"
- "The Music of Erich Zann"
- "Tribute"
