= I Cheated Me Right Out of You =

Single by Moe Bandy

from the album One of a Kind
- B-side: "Honky Tonk Merry-Go-Round"
- Released: September 1979
- Genre: Country
- Label: Columbia
- Songwriter: Bobby Barker
- Producer: Ray Baker

Moe Bandy singles chronology
| "Barstool Mountain" (1979) | "I Cheated Me Right Out of You" (1979) | "One of a Kind" (1980) |

"I Cheated Me Right Out of You" is a song written by Bobby Barker, and recorded by American country music artist Moe Bandy. It was released in September 1979 as the first single from the album One of a Kind. The song was Bandy's only number one country hit as a solo artist. The single stayed at number one for a single week and spent a total of ten weeks on the country chart.

== Charts ==
=== Weekly charts ===
| Chart (1979) | Peak position |
|---|---|
| US Hot Country Songs (Billboard) | 1 |
| Canadian RPM Country Tracks | 1 |

=== Year-end charts ===
| Chart (1980) | Position |
|---|---|
| US Hot Country Songs (Billboard) | 38 |
