= I May Never Get to Heaven =

Single by Conway Twitty

from the album Cross Winds
- B-side: "Grand Ole Blues"
- Released: July 1979
- Recorded: February 28, 1979
- Studio: Woodland (Nashville, Tennessee)
- Genre: Country
- Length: 2:52
- Label: MCA
- Songwriters: Bill Anderson; Buddy Killen
- Producers: Conway Twitty, David Barnes

Conway Twitty singles chronology
"Don't Take It Away" (1979)	"I May Never Get to Heaven" (1979)	"Happy Birthday Darlin'" (1979)

"I May Never Get to Heaven'" is a song written by Bill Anderson and Buddy Killen, and was originally recorded by Don Gibson in 1960 and released on the B-side of "Just One Time",

== Conway Twitty recording ==
In 1979, the song was recorded by American country music artist Conway Twitty in Studio B of Woodland Sound Studios in Nashville. It was released in July 1979 as the second single from his album Cross Winds. The song was Twitty's 22nd number one hit on the country chart. The song stayed at number one for a single week and spent a total of 15 weeks on the country chart.

== Charts ==
=== Weekly charts ===
Chart (1979)	Peak position
US Hot Country Songs (Billboard)	1
Canadian RPM Country Tracks	1

=== Year-end charts ===
Chart (1979)	Position
US Hot Country Songs (Billboard)	20

== Other cover versions ==
- B.J. Thomas released a version in 1968 as the B-side to his Top 40 hit The Eyes of a New York Woman.
- The song was notably covered by Aretha Franklin in 1967, on the album Take It Like You Give It, her final album for Columbia Records before moving to Atlantic Records.
