= Every Which Way but Loose (song) =

Single by Eddie Rabbitt

from the album Every Which Way But Loose Soundtrack
- B-side: "Under the Double Eagle"
- Released: December 1978 (U.S.)
- Recorded: 1978
- Genre: Country
- Length: 2:51
- Label: Elektra
- Songwriters: Milton Brown; Steve Dorff; Snuff Garrett
- Producer: Snuff Garrett

Eddie Rabbitt singles chronology
"I Just Want to Love You" (1978)	"Every Which Way but Loose" (1978)	"Suspicions" (1979)

"Every Which Way but Loose" is a song written by Steve Dorff, Snuff Garrett and Milton Brown, and recorded by American country music artist Eddie Rabbitt. It was released in November 1978 as the only single from the soundtrack to the 1978 film of the same name, it spent three weeks atop the Billboard magazine Hot Country Singles chart in February 1979.

== Highest debut ==
Released just weeks before Every Which Way But Loose premiered nationwide, the song debuted at No. 18 on the Billboard Hot Country Singles chart, the highest debut since the inception of the 100-position chart in July 1973. The record was later tied by Garth Brooks' "Good Ride Cowboy" in 2005.

== Charts ==
=== Weekly charts ===
Chart (1978–1979)	Peak position
Australia (Kent Music Report)	32
US Hot Country Songs (Billboard)	1
US Billboard Hot 100	30
US Adult Contemporary (Billboard)	26
US Cash Box Top 100	34
Canadian RPM Country Tracks	1
Canadian RPM Top Singles	47
Canadian RPM Adult Contemporary Tracks	4
New Zealand Singles Chart	28
U.K. Singles Chart	41

=== Year-end charts ===
Chart (1979)	Position
US Hot Country Songs (Billboard)	4
