= You're the Only One (Dolly Parton song) =

Single by Dolly Parton

from the album Great Balls of Fire
- B-side: "Down"
- Released: May 14, 1979
- Recorded: 1979
- Genre: Country pop
- Length: 3:23
- Label: RCA
- Songwriters: Carole Bayer Sager, Bruce Roberts
- Producers: Dean Parks, Gregg Perry

Dolly Parton singles chronology
"I Really Got the Feeling" (1978)	"You're the Only One" (1979)	"Sweet Summer Lovin'" (1979)

"You're the Only One" is a song written by Carole Bayer Sager and Bruce Roberts, and recorded by American entertainer Dolly Parton. Included on Parton's album Great Balls of Fire, the song was released as the album's first single in May 1979, topping the U.S. country singles chart. It was her fifth consecutive chart-topper since 1977.

== Chart performance ==
Weekly

Chart (1979)	Peak position
Australia (Kent Music Report)	33
US Hot Country Songs (Billboard)	1
US Billboard Hot 100	59
US Adult Contemporary (Billboard)	14
Canadian RPM Country Tracks	1
Canadian RPM Top Singles	63
Canadian RPM Adult Contemporary Tracks	1

Year-End

Chart (1979)	Peak Position
US Hot Country Songs (Billboard)	8
