= Don't Take It Away =

Single by Conway Twitty

from the album Cross Winds
- B-side: "Draggin' Chains"
- Released: March 1979
- Recorded: February 5, 1979
- Studio: Woodland Sound Studio B (Nashville, Tennessee)
- Genre: Country
- Length: 3:48
- Label: MCA
- Songwriter(s): Troy Seals; Max D. Barnes
- Producer(s): Conway Twitty, David Barnes

Conway Twitty singles chronology
"Your Love Had Taken Me That High" (1978)	"Don't Take It Away" (1979)	"I May Never Get to Heaven" (1979)

"Don't Take It Away" is a song written by Troy Seals and Max D. Barnes, and recorded by American country music artist Jody Miller on her 1975 album, Will You Love Me Tomorrow. Her song peaked at number 67 on the U.S. Country charts in 1975. It was covered by American country music artist Conway Twitty in March 1979 as the first single from his album Cross Winds. Twitty's version was his 21st number one country hit. The single stayed at number one for a single week and spent a total of nine weeks on the country chart.

== Charts ==
=== Weekly charts ===
Chart (1979)	Peak position
US Hot Country Songs (Billboard)	1
Canadian RPM Country Tracks	1

=== Year-end charts ===
Chart (1979)	Position
US Hot Country Songs (Billboard)	24
