= Moe Bandy =

American singer (born 1944)

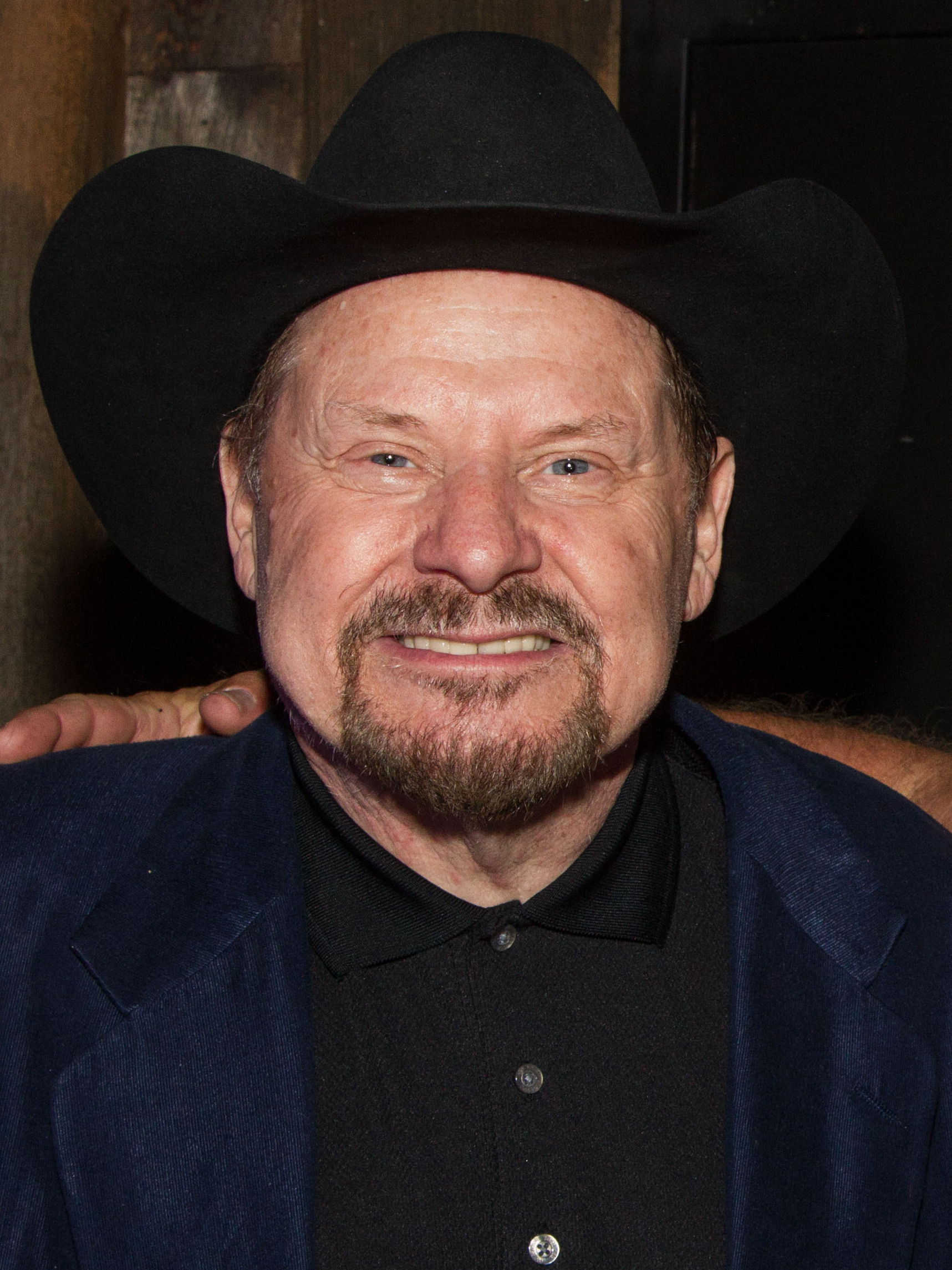
- Bandy in 2015

Background information
- Born: Marion Franklin Bandy Jr. February 12, 1944 (age 82); Meridian, Mississippi, U.S.
- Origin: San Antonio, Texas, U.S.
- Genres: Country
- Occupation: Singer
- Instruments: Vocals, guitar
- Years active: 1964–present
- Labels: GRC, Columbia, Curb
- Website: moebandy.com

Marion Franklin "Moe" Bandy Jr. (born February 12, 1944) is an American country music singer. He was most popular during the 1970s, when he had several hit songs, both alone and as part of a duo with Joe Stampley.

== Early life and recordings ==
Marion Bandy was born in Meridian, Mississippi, United States, also the hometown of country singer Jimmie Rodgers. He later stated: "My grandfather worked on the railroads with Jimmie Rodgers. He was the boss of the railway yard in Meridian and Jimmie Rodgers worked for him. He said that he played his guitar all the time between work."

He was nicknamed Moe by his father when he was a child. The Bandy family moved to San Antonio, Texas, when Moe was six. His mother played piano and sang. Bandy was taught to play the guitar by his father who had a country band called the Mission City Playboys, but made little use of the ability until he was in his teens. His father's wish that Moe also play the fiddle never materialized.

He made some appearances with the Mission City Playboys, but during his high-school years, he showed a great deal more interest in rodeos than in music. He tried bronc riding and bull riding, and by the time he was 16, both his brother Mike and he were competing in rodeos all over Texas.

== Career success ==
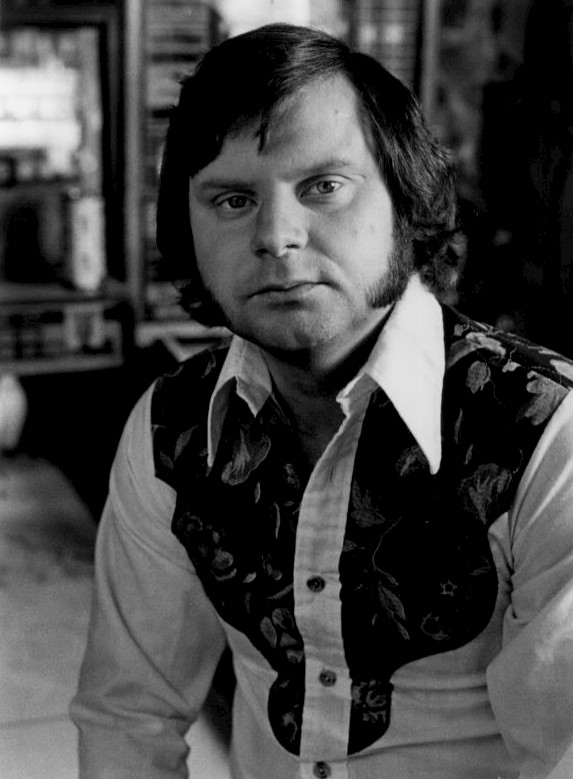
Bandy in 1977

In 1962, he began to pursue a career in country music. He assembled a band that he called Moe and the Mavericks, and found work playing small beer joints, honky-tonks, and clubs over a wide area around San Antonio. When he was young, he tried to sound like Hank Williams and George Jones – "I even had my hair cut short like his."

During the day, he worked for his father as a sheet metal worker, a job that lasted for 12 years, during which time he made a few recordings for various small labels. In 1964, his first single, "Lonely Girl", made little impression. In 1973, he went solo when record producer Ray Baker, who had listened to his demonstration tapes, suggested that he come to Nashville, Tennessee. Bandy's song "I Just Started Hatin' Cheatin' Songs Today" was initially released on Footprint Records, but it came to the attention of the GRC record label. In March 1974, it entered the US country chart, eventually peaking at number 17. Other minor hits followed, including "It Was Always So Easy to Find an Unhappy Woman (Till I Started Looking for Mine)" and "Don't Anyone Make Love at Home Anymore".

In 1975, a song written by his friend Lefty Frizzell and Whitey Shaffer gave him a number-seven country hit. "Bandy the Rodeo Clown" became not only one of his own favorites, but also one of his most popular recordings. Bandy found success at Columbia Records with Paul Craft's "Hank Williams, You Wrote My Life" and added further hits, including "Here I Am Drunk Again". From 1977 through 1979, he was a country chart regular with singles such as "I'm Sorry for You, My Friend", "Cowboys Ain't Supposed to Cry", "That's What Makes the Jukebox Play", and a duet with Janie Fricke, "It's a Cheating Situation". In 1979, he achieved his first solo number one with "I Cheated Me Right Out of You".

== Duets ==
That same year, in 1979, Bandy joined forces with Joe Stampley and recorded a tongue-in-cheek novelty single: "Just Good Ol' Boys". The song went on to top the country chart and it led to a continuation of their partnership. The duo, commonly known as "Moe and Joe", had more novelty hits between 1979 and 1985, including "Holding the Bag", "Tell Ole I Ain't Here", and "Hey Joe (Hey Moe)". In 1984, they ran into copyright problems with their parody of the then-current Boy George/Culture Club phenomenon; "Where's the Dress" used the guitar-riff introduction from Culture Club's hit "Karma Chameleon", which reached number one for three weeks on the Billboard Hot 100 early that year. "Where's the Dress" peaked at number eight on the country charts.

During the 1980s, Bandy maintained a steady line of solo successes, including "Yesterday Once More", "Rodeo Romeo", "She's Not Really Cheatin' (She's Just Gettin' Even)", and "Till I'm Too Old to Die Young". Bandy also registered duet successes with Judy Bailey ("Following the Feeling") and Becky Hobbs ("Let's Get Over Them Together"). Over the years, he maintained a regular touring schedule and appeared on television shows. In later years, he cut back on his touring schedule.

== Later life ==
Bandy summed up his music when he said, "I really think my songs are about life. There's cheating, drinking, and divorcing going on everywhere, and that's what hardcore country music is all about." He added: "If I'd done all the things I sing about, I'd be dead."

Bandy opened his popular Americana Theatre in Branson, Missouri, in 1991 and performs frequently there.

Moe and his brother Mike Bandy, a six-time NFR bull-riding qualifier, were inducted into the Texas Rodeo Cowboy Hall of Fame in 2007.
