= Conway Twitty discography =

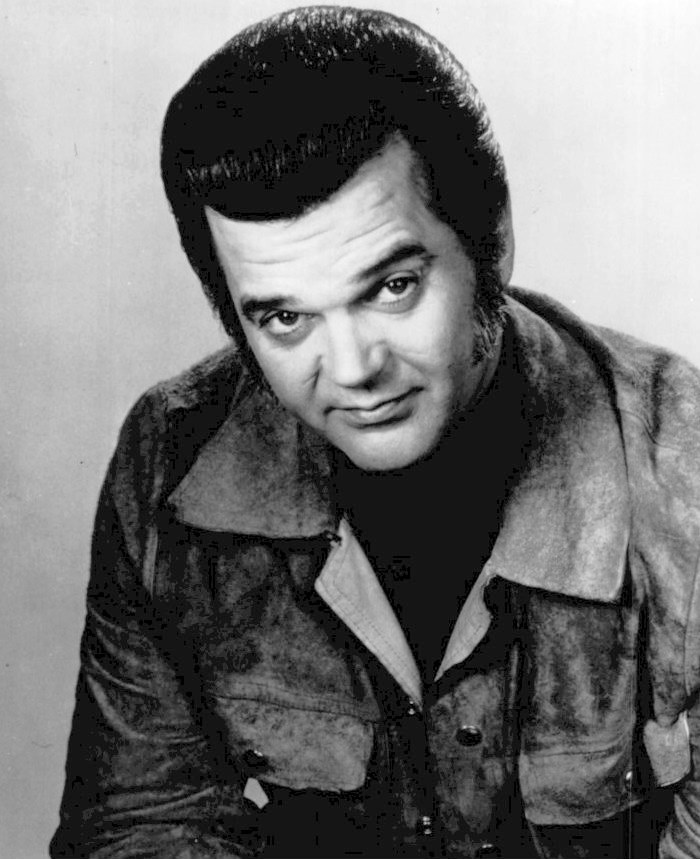
- Studio albums: 57
- Compilation albums: 20
- Singles: 99
- Music videos: 4
- Guest singles: 2
- Promotional singles: 4
- #1 Singles (U.S.): 56
- #1 Singles (Canada): 49

This is a detailed discography for American singer and songwriter Conway Twitty; he released 58 studio albums during his life.

Beginning his studio album journey in the late 1950s with releases such as "Conway Twitty Sings" and "Saturday Night with Conway Twitty," Twitty's early work primarily explored the rockabilly genre. As the 1960s progressed, his musical direction shifted, marking his foray into country music, where he found success and recognition. Albums like "Next in Line" and "Darling, You Know I Wouldn't Lie" from this era began charting, highlighting his influence in the country genre.

The 1970s heralded Twitty's golden era in country music, with albums like "Hello Darlin'," "Fifteen Years Ago," and "You've Never Been This Far Before" not only achieving high chart positions but earning RIAA certifications, including Gold records. His ability to churn out hits continued into the 1980s and 90s, with albums such as "Heart & Soul," "Rest Your Love on Me," and "Crazy in Love," cementing his status as a country music stalwart.

Twitty's contributions were also captured through compilations, singles, and promotional materials, including celebrated tracks like "It's Only Make Believe" and collaborations.

== Studio albums ==
=== 1950s and 1960s ===
Title	Details	Peak chart positions	
Title	Details	US Country	US
Conway Twitty Sings	Release date: 1959; Label: MGM Records	—	—
Saturday Night with Conway Twitty	Release date: 1959; Label: MGM Records	—	—
Lonely Blue Boy	Release date: 1960; Label: MGM Records	—	—
The Rock & Roll Story	Release date: 1961; Label: MGM Records	—	—
The Conway Twitty Touch	Release date: 1961; Label: MGM Records	—	—
Portrait of a Fool	Release date: 1962; Label: MGM Records	—	—
R&B '63	Release date: 1963; Label: MGM Records	—	—
Hit the Road!	Release date: 1964; Label: MGM Records	—	—
Conway Twitty Sings	Release date: 1966; Label: Decca Records	25	—
Look Into My Teardrops	Release date: 1966; Label: Decca Records	22	—
Country	Release date: 1967; Label: Decca Records	32	—
Here's Conway Twitty and His Lonely Blue Boys	Release date: 1968; Label: Decca Records	12	—
Next in Line	Release date: 1968; Label: Decca Records	9	—
Darling, You Know I Wouldn't Lie	Release date: 1969; Label: Decca Records	6	—
I Love You More Today	Release date: 1969; Label: Decca Records	7	161
You Can't Take the Country Out of Conway	Release date: 1969; Label: MGM Records	—	—
"—" denotes releases that did not chart

=== 1970s ===
Title	Details	Peak chart positions				Certifications (sales thresholds)
Title	Details	US Country	US	CAN Country	CAN	Certifications (sales thresholds)
To See My Angel Cry / That's When She Started to Stop Loving You	Release date: 1970; Label: Decca Records	8	—	—	—	
Hello Darlin'	Release date: 1970; Label: Decca Records	1	65	—	—	RIAA: Gold
Fifteen Years Ago	Release date: 1970; Label: Decca Records	4	140	—	—	
How Much More Can She Stand	Release date: 1971; Label: Decca Records	5	91	—	—	
I Wonder What She'll Think About Me Leaving	Release date: 1971; Label: Decca Records	5	142	—	—	
Conway Twitty Sings the Blues	Release date: 1972; Label: MGM Records	—	—	—	—	
I Can't See Me Without You	Release date: 1972; Label: Decca Records	10	130	—	—	
I Can't Stop Loving You / (Lost Her Love) On Our Last Date	Release date: 1972; Label: Decca Records	3	—	—	—	
She Needs Someone to Hold Her (When She Cries)	Release date: 1973; Label: MCA Records	3	—	—	—	
You've Never Been This Far Before / Baby's Gone	Release date: 1973; Label: MCA Records	1	134	—	—	RIAA: Gold
Clinging to a Saving Hand / Steal Away	Release date: 1973; Label: MCA Records	13	—	—	—	
Honky Tonk Angel	Release date: 1974; Label: MCA Records	1	—	—	—	
I'm Not Through Loving You Yet	Release date: 1974; Label: MCA Records	4	—	—	—	
Linda on My Mind	Release date: 1975; Label: MCA Records	1	—	—	—	
The High Priest of Country Music	Release date: 1975; Label: MCA Records	3	—	—	76	MC: Gold
This Time I've Hurt Her More Than She Loves Me	Release date: 1975; Label: MCA Records	3	202	—	—	
Now and Then	Release date: 1976; Label: MCA Records	4	—	—	—	
Play Guitar Play	Release date: 1977; Label: MCA Records	3	—	—	—	
I've Already Loved You in My Mind	Release date: 1977; Label: MCA Records	4	—	—	—	
Georgia Keeps Pulling on My Ring	Release date: 1978; Label: MCA Records	13	—	—	—	
Conway	Release date: 1978; Label: MCA Records	13	—	1	—	
Cross Winds	Release date: 1979; Label: MCA Records	11	—	1	—	
"—" denotes releases that did not chart

=== 1980s ===
Title	Details	Peak chart positions		
Title	Details	US Country	US	CAN Country
Heart & Soul	Release date: 1980; Label: MCA Records	10	—	3
Rest Your Love on Me	Release date: 1980; Label: MCA Records	12	—	16
Mr. T	Release date: 1981; Label: MCA Records	5	—	—
Southern Comfort	Release date: 1982; Label: Elektra Records	5	144	—
Conway's #1 Classics, Volume One	Release date: 1982; Label: Elektra Records	21	—	—
Dream Maker	Release date: 1982; Label: Elektra Records	15	—	—
Conway's #1 Classics, Volume Two	Release date: 1982; Label: Elektra Records	35	—	—
Lost in the Feeling	Release date: 1983; Label: Warner Bros. Records	27	203	—
Merry Twismas	Release date: 1983; Label: Warner Bros. Records	37	—	—
By Heart	Release date: 1984; Label: Warner Bros. Records	18	207	17
Don't Call Him a Cowboy	Release date: 1985; Label: Warner Bros. Records	7	—	—
Chasin' Rainbows	Release date: 1985; Label: Warner Bros. Records	29	—	—
Fallin' for You for Years	Release date: 1986; Label: Warner Bros. Records	37	—	—
Borderline	Release date: 1987; Label: MCA Records	25	—	—
Still in Your Dreams	Release date: 1988; Label: MCA Records	28	—	—
House on Old Lonesome Road	Release date: 1989; Label: MCA Records	39	—	—
"—" denotes releases that did not chart

=== 1990s ===
Title	Details	Peak chart positions	
Title	Details	US Country	US
Crazy in Love	Release date: 1990; Label: MCA Records	35	—
Even Now	Release date: 1991; Label: MCA Records	—	—
Final Touches	Release date: 1993; Label: MCA Records	29	135
"—" denotes releases that did not chart

== Compilations ==
Title	Details	Peak chart positions		Certifications
Title	Details	US Country	CAN	Certifications
Conway Twitty's Greatest Hits...	Release date: 1960; Label: MGM Records	—	—	
Hits	Release date: 1971; Label: MGM Records	—	—	
Conway Twitty's Greatest Hits Vol. I	Release date: 1972; Label: Decca Records	11	92	RIAA: Gold
Conway Twitty's Greatest Hits Vol. II	Release date: 1976; Label: MCA Records	1	—	RIAA: Gold; MC: Gold
The Very Best of Conway Twitty	Release date: 1978; Label: MCA Records	13	—	RIAA: Platinum
Number Ones	Release date: 1982; Label: MCA Records	20	—	RIAA: Gold
Classic Conway	Release date: 1983; Label: MCA Records	57	—	
Conway's Latest Greatest Hits Volume 1	Release date: 1984; Label: Warner Bros. Records	25	—	
The Best of Conway Twitty	Release date: 1985; Label: MCA Records			
A Night with Conway Twitty	Release date: 1986; Label: MCA Records	—	—	
#1's: The Warner Bros. Years	Release date: 1988; Label: Warner Bros. Records	—	—	
Greatest Hits Volume III	Release date: 1990; Label: MCA Records	54	—	
The Final Recordings of His Greatest Hits Volume I	Release date: 1993; Label: Curb Records	—	—	RIAA: Gold
Sings Songs of Love	Release date: 1995; Label: MCA Special Products	—	—	
Super Hits	Release date: 1995; Label: Epic Records	71	—	
20th Century Masters: The Millennium Collection	Release date: 2001; Label: MCA Records	65	—	
The Legend	Release date: 2004; Label: Platinum Disc	73	—	
25 Number Ones	Release date: 2004; Label: MCA Records	29	—	
Icon: Conway Twitty	Release date: 2011; Label: MCA Records	44	—	
Hello Darlin': Greatest Hits Live	Release date: 2015; Label: MCA Records	—	—	
"—" denotes releases that did not chart

== Singles ==
=== 1950s ===
Year	Single	Peak chart positions				Certifications	Album
Year	Single	US	CAN	AUS	UK	Certifications	Album
1957	"Just in Time"	—	—	—	—		Non-album singles
1957	"I Need Your Lovin'"	93	—	—	—		Non-album singles
1958	"I Vibrate (From My Head to My Feet)"	—	—	—	—		Non-album singles
1958	"It's Only Make Believe"	1	1	5	1	RIAA: Gold	Sings
1958	"Story of My Love"	28	—	68	30		Sings
1959	"Hey Little Lucy (Don'tcha Put No Lipstick On)"	87	—	—	—		Saturday Night
1959	"Mona Lisa"	29	—	1	5		Sings
1959	"Danny Boy"	10	—	12	—		Saturday Night
1959	"Lonely Blue Boy"	6	—	14	—		Lonely Blue Boy
"—" denotes releases that did not chart

=== 1960s ===
Year	Single	Peak chart positions					Album
Year	Single	US Country	US	CAN Country	AUS	UK	Album
1960	"What Am I Living For"	—	26	—	34	—	Greatest Hits
1960	"Is a Blue Bird Blue"	—	35	—	24	43	Non-album single
1960	"She's Mine"	—	98	—	—	—	Saturday Night
1960	"What a Dream"	—	106	—	90	—	Non-album single
1960	"Whole Lotta Shakin' Goin' On"	—	55	—	88	—	A Rock and Roll Story
1960	"C'est Si Bon"	—	22	—	49	40	Non-album single
1961	"Next Kiss (Is the Last Goodbye)"	—	72	—	—	—	Portrait of a Fool
1961	"Sweet Sorrow"	—	107	—	—	—	Portrait of a Fool
1961	"Portrait of a Fool"	—	98	—	—	—	Portrait of a Fool
1962	"The Pickup"	—	—	—	83	—	Hit the Road!
1966	"Guess My Eyes Were Bigger Than My Heart"	18	—	—	—	—	Conway Twitty Sings
1966	"Look Into My Teardrops"	36	—	—	—	—	Look Into My Teardrops
1967	"I Don't Want to Be with Me"	21	—	—	—	—	Look Into My Teardrops
1967	"Don't Put Your Hurt in My Heart"	32	—	—	—	—	Country
1967	"Funny (But I'm Not Laughing)"	61	—	—	—	—	Country
1968	"The Image of Me"	5	—	2	—	—	Here's Conway Twitty and His Lonely Blue Boys
1968	"Next in Line"	1	—	2	—	—	Next in Line
1968	"Darling You Know I Wouldn't Lie"	2	—	2	—	—	Darling You Know I Wouldn't Lie
1969	"I Love You More Today"	1	—	2	—	—	I Love You More Today
1969	"To See My Angel Cry"	1	—	1	—	—	To See My Angel Cry / That's When She Started to Stop Loving You
1969	"That's When She Started to Stop Loving You"	3	—	4	—	—	To See My Angel Cry / That's When She Started to Stop Loving You
"—" denotes releases that did not chart

=== 1970s ===
Year	Single	Peak chart positions					Certifications	Album
Year	Single	US Country	US	CAN Country	CAN	AUS	Certifications	Album
1970	"Hello Darlin'"	1	60	2	—	93	RIAA: Platinum	Hello Darlin'
1970	"Fifteen Years Ago"	1	81	1	—	—		Fifteen Years Ago
1971	"How Much More Can She Stand"	1	105	1	—	—		How Much More Can She Stand
1971	"I Wonder What She'll Think About Me Leaving"	4	112	3	—	—		I Wonder What She'll Think About Me Leaving
1971	"I Can't See Me Without You"	4	—	1	—	—		I Can't See Me Without You / (Lost Her Love) On Our Last Date
1972	"(Lost Her Love) On Our Last Date"	1	112	1	—	—		I Can't Stop Loving You
1972	"I Can't Stop Loving You"	1	—	1	—	—		I Can't Stop Loving You
1972	"She Needs Someone to Hold Her (When She Cries)"	1	—	8	—	—		She Needs Someone to Hold Her (When She Cries)
1973	"Louisiana Woman, Mississippi Man" (with Loretta Lynn)	1	—	1	—	—	RIAA: Gold	Louisiana Woman, Mississippi Man
1973	"Baby's Gone"	2	—	2	—	—		You've Never Been This Far Before / Baby's Gone
1973	"You've Never Been This Far Before" (Note: "You've Never Been This Far Before" also peaked at number 37 on the U.S. Billboard Hot Adult Contemporary Tracks chart and number 21 on the Canadian RPM Adult Contemporary Tracks chart.)	1	22	1	30	12		You've Never Been This Far Before / Baby's Gone
1974	"There's a Honky Tonk Angel (Who'll Take Me Back In)"	1	—	1	—	—		Honky Tonk Angel
1974	"I'm Not Through Loving You Yet"	3	—	1	—	—		I'm Not Through Loving You Yet
1974	"I See the Want To in Your Eyes"	1	—	1	—	—		I'm Not Through Loving You Yet
1975	"Linda on My Mind"	1	61	1	51	—		Linda on My Mind
1975	"Touch the Hand" (with Joni Lee; uncredited)	1	—	8	—	—		The High Priest of Country Music
1975	"Don't Cry Joni" (with Joni Lee; uncredited)	4	63	2	94	—		The High Priest of Country Music
1975	"This Time I've Hurt Her More Than She Loves Me"	1	—	1	—	—		This Time I've Hurt Her More Than She Loves Me
1976	"After All the Good Is Gone"	1	—	1	—	—		Now and Then
1976	"The Games That Daddies Play"	1	—	1	—	—		Conway Twitty's Greatest Hits Vol. II
1976	"I Can't Believe She Gives It All to Me"	1	—	1	—	—		Play Guitar Play
1977	"Play Guitar Play"	1	—	1	—	—		Play Guitar Play
1977	"I've Already Loved You in My Mind"	1	—	4	—	—		I've Already Loved You in My Mind
1977	"Georgia Keeps Pulling on My Ring"	3	—	1	—	—		Georgia Keeps Pulling on My Ring
1978	"The Grandest Lady of Them All"	16	—	12	—	—		Georgia Keeps Pulling on My Ring
1978	"Boogie Grass Band"	2	—	1	—	—		Conway
1978	"Your Love Had Taken Me That High"	3	—	1	—	—		Conway
1979	"Don't Take It Away"	1	—	1	—	—		Cross Winds
1979	"I May Never Get to Heaven"	1	—	1	—	—		Cross Winds
1979	"Happy Birthday Darlin'"	1	—	13	—	—		Cross Winds
"—" denotes releases that did not chart

=== 1980s ===
Year	Single	Peak chart positions		Certifications	Album
Year	Single	US Country	CAN Country	Certifications	Album
1980	"I'd Love to Lay You Down"	1	1	RIAA: Platinum	Heart & Soul
1980	"I've Never Seen the Likes of You"	6	7		Heart & Soul
1980	"A Bridge That Just Won't Burn"	3	6		Rest Your Love on Me
1981	"Rest Your Love on Me" / "I Am the Dreamer (You Are the Dream)" (Note: Single was released as a double A-side.)	1	9		Rest Your Love on Me
1981	"Tight Fittin' Jeans"	1	8	RIAA: Platinum	Mr. T
1981	"Red Neckin' Love Makin' Night"	1	3		Mr. T
1981	"The Clown"	1	7		Southern Comfort
1982	"Slow Hand"	1	6	RIAA: Platinum	Southern Comfort
1982	"We Did But Now You Don't"	2	2		Dream Maker
1983	"The Rose"	1	1		Dream Maker
1983	"Lost in the Feeling"	2	1		Lost in the Feeling
1983	"Heartache Tonight"	6	3		Lost in the Feeling
1983	"Three Times a Lady"	7	4		Lost in the Feeling
1984	"Somebody's Needin' Somebody"	1	3		By Heart
1984	"I Don't Know a Thing About Love (The Moon Song)"	1	1		By Heart
1984	"Ain't She Somethin' Else"	1	1		Conway's Latest Greatest Hits Volume 1
1985	"Don't Call Him a Cowboy"	1	1		Don't Call Him a Cowboy
1985	"Between Blue Eyes and Jeans"	3	7		Don't Call Him a Cowboy
1985	"The Legend and the Man"	19	21		Chasin' Rainbows
1985	"You'll Never Know How Much I Needed You Today"	26	35		Chasin' Rainbows
1986	"Desperado Love"	1	1		Fallin' for You for Years
1986	"Fallin' for You for Years"	2	2		Fallin' for You for Years
1987	"Julia"	2	3		Borderline
1987	"I Want to Know You Before We Make Love"	2	2		Borderline
1987	"That's My Job"	6	4	RIAA: PLATINUM	Borderline
1988	"Goodbye Time"	7	11		Still in Your Dreams
1988	"Saturday Night Special"	9	19		Still in Your Dreams
1988	"I Wish I Was Still in Your Dreams"	4	4		Still in Your Dreams
1989	"She's Got a Single Thing in Mind"	2	4		House on Old Lonesome Road
1989	"House on Old Lonesome Road"	19	28		House on Old Lonesome Road
1989	"Who's Gonna Know"	51	—		House on Old Lonesome Road
"—" denotes releases that did not chart

=== 1990s ===
Year	Single	Peak chart positions			Album
Year	Single	US Country	CAN Country	CAN AC	Album
1990	"Fit to Be Tied Down"	30	—	—	Greatest Hits Volume III
1990	"Crazy in Love"	2	4	—	Crazy in Love
1990	"I Couldn't See You Leavin'"	3	3	—	Crazy in Love
1991	"One Bridge I Didn't Burn"	57	—	—	Crazy in Love
1991	"She's Got a Man on Her Mind"	22	43	—	Even Now
1991	"Who Did They Think He Was"	56	93	—	Even Now
1993	"I'm the Only Thing (I'll Hold Against You)"	62	55	—	Final Touches
1993	"Don't It Make You Lonely"	—	—	—	Final Touches
1994	"Rainy Night in Georgia" (with Sam Moore)	—	—	33	Rhythm, Country and Blues
"—" denotes releases that did not chart

=== As featured artist ===
Year	Single	Peak chart positions		Album
Year	Single	US Country	CAN Country	Album
1983	"My First Country Song" (Dean Martin with Conway Twitty)	35	—	The Nashville Sessions
1988	"It's Only Make Believe" (Ronnie McDowell with Conway Twitty)	8	5	I'm Still Missing You
2004	"(I Wanna Hear) A Cheatin' Song" (Note: Twitty's vocal on "(I Wanna Hear) A Cheatin' Song" was spliced together from previously recorded performances.) (Anita Cochran with Conway Twitty)	57	—	Non-album single
"—" denotes releases that did not chart

=== Promotional singles ===
Year	Single	Peak chart positions		Album
Year	Single	US Country	CAN Country	Album
1970	"What Am I Living For" (re-release)	59	—	Hits
1971	"What a Dream" (re-release)	50	26	Hits
1982	"Over Thirty (Not Over the Hill)"	69	—	Mr. T
1983	"We Had It All"	44	—	Mr. T
"—" denotes releases that did not chart

== Music videos ==
Year	Video	Director
1990	"Crazy in Love"	Marc Ball
1992	"Who Did They Think He Was"	George Bloom
1994	"Rainy Night in Georgia" (with Sam Moore)	Charley Randazzo
2004	"(I Wanna Hear) A Cheatin' Song" (with Anita Cochran)	

== See also ==
- Conway Twitty and Loretta Lynn discography
