= 25 Number Ones =

Greatest hits album by Conway Twitty
- Released: August 24, 2004
- Genre: Country
- Length: 1:16:32
- Label: MCA
- Producer: Owen Bradley

Conway Twitty chronology
The Legend (2004)	25 Number Ones (2004)	Conway Twitty: ICON (2011)

25 Number Ones is an album from country music artist Conway Twitty, released in 2004, comprising 25 songs on a single compact disc. The album reached number 29 on the U.S. Billboard country albums chart and features such hits as "Hello Darlin'" and "Tight Fittin' Jeans".

== Track listing ==
No.	Title	Length
1.	"It's Only Make Believe"	2:14
2.	"Next in Line"	2:51
3.	"Hello Darlin'"	2:29
4.	"After the Fire Is Gone"	2:42
5.	"Lead Me On"	2:26
6.	"I Can't Stop Loving You"	2:49
7.	"Louisiana Woman, Mississippi Man"	2:32
8.	"You've Never Been This Far Before"	3:02
9.	"There's a Honky Tonk Angel (Who'll Take Me Back In)"	2:58
10.	"As Soon as I Hang Up the Phone"	2:42
11.	"I See the Want To in Your Eyes"	2:50
12.	"Linda on My Mind"	2:43
13.	"Touch the Hand"	3:23
14.	"After All the Good Is Gone"	2:58
15.	"Play Guitar Play"	3:24
16.	"Don't Take It Away"	3:45
17.	"Happy Birthday Darlin'"	2:53
18.	"I'd Love to Lay You Down"	3:21
19.	"Rest Your Love on Me"	4:32
20.	"Tight Fittin' Jeans"	2:51
21.	"Red Neckin' Love Makin' Night"	4:44
22.	"The Clown"	4:02
23.	"Slow Hand"	2:56
24.	"I Don't Know a Thing About Love (The Moon Song)"	2:59
25.	"Desperado Love"	2:24

== Chart performance ==
Chart (2004)	Peak position
U.S. Billboard Top Country Albums	29
