= Greatest Hits Volume III (Conway Twitty album) =

Greatest hits album by Conway Twitty
- Released: 1990
- Genre: Country
- Length: 36:08
- Label: MCA
- Producers: Jimmy Bowen, Conway Twitty, Dee Henry

Conway Twitty chronology
House on Old Lonesome Road (1989)	Greatest Hits Volume III (1990)	Crazy in Love (1990)

Greatest Hits Volume III is a compilation album by American country music artist Conway Twitty. It was released in 1990 via MCA Records. The album also includes the single "Fit to Be Tied Down".

== Track listing ==
No.	Title	Writer(s)	Length
1.	"Fit to Be Tied Down"	Walt Aldridge	3:27
2.	"That's My Job"	Gary Burr	4:52
3.	"She's Got a Single Thing in Mind"	Aldridge	3:42
4.	"Who's Gonna Know"	Richard Mainegra, Jimmy Griffin, Rick Yancey	2:48
5.	"House on Old Lonesome Road"	Dave Gibson, Bernie Nelson	3:56
6.	"Saturday Night Special"	Larry Bastian, Dewayne Blackwell	3:17
7.	"Goodbye Time"	Roger Murrah, James Dean Hicks	3:25
8.	"Julia"	John Barlow Jarvis, Don Cook	3:44
9.	"I Wish I Was Still in Your Dreams"	Jarvis, Cook	3:21
10.	"I Want to Know You Before We Make Love"	Becky Hobbs, Candy Parton	3:36

== Chart performance ==
Chart (1990)	Peak position
US Top Country Albums (Billboard)	54
