= Conway's Latest Greatest Hits Volume 1 =

Conway's Latest Greastest Hits Volume 1

Greatest hits album by Conway Twitty
- Released: 1984
- Genre: Country
- Length: 36:28
- Label: Warner Bros.
- Producer: Conway Twitty, Jimmy Bowen, Dee Henry

Conway Twitty chronology
| By Heart (1984) | Conway's Latest Greastest Hits Volume 1 (1984) | Don't Call Him a Cowboy (1985) |

Conway's Latest Greatest Hits Volume 1 is a compilation album by American country music artist Conway Twitty. It was released in 1984 via Warner Bros. Records. The album includes the hit single "Ain't She Somethin' Else".

== Track listing ==
| No. | Title | Writer(s) | Length |
|---|---|---|---|
| 1. | "Ain't She Somethin' Else" | Bill Rice, Jerry Foster | 3:20 |
| 2. | "The Rose" | Amanda McBroom | 3:32 |
| 3. | "Slow Hand" | John Bettis, Michael Clark | 2:53 |
| 4. | "Somebody's Needin' Somebody" | Len Chera | 3:54 |
| 5. | "Three Times a Lady" | Lionel Richie | 3:54 |
| 6. | "I Don't Know a Thing About Love (The Moon Song)" | Harlan Howard | 2:56 |
| 7. | "The Clown" | Wayne Carson, Brenda Barnett, Charlie Chalmers, Sandra Rhodes | 3:59 |
| 8. | "Heartache Tonight" | Glenn Frey, Don Henley, Bob Seger, JD Souther | 3:58 |
| 9. | "Lost in the Feeling" | Lewis Anderson | 3:08 |
| 10. | "We Did But Now You Don't" | Pat McManus, Woody Bomar, Berni Clifford | 3:57 |

== Chart performance ==
| Chart (1984) | Peak position |
|---|---|
| US Top Country Albums (Billboard) | 25 |
