= Classic Conway =

Greatest hits album by Conway Twitty
- Released: 1983
- Genre: Country
- Length: 29:53
- Label: MCA
- Producer: Owen Bradley; Conway Twitty; Ron Chancey

Conway Twitty chronology
Conway's #1 Classics, Volume Two (1982)	Classic Conway (1983)	Lost in the Feeling (1983)

Classic Conway is a compilation album by American country music artist Conway Twitty. It was released in 1983 via MCA Records.

== Track listing ==
No.	Title	Writer(s)	Length
1.	"Tight Fittin' Jeans"	Michael Huffman	2:48
2.	"I Can't Believe She Gives It All to Me"	Conway Twitty	2:25
3.	"Play Guitar Play"	Twitty	3:20
4.	"The Grandest Lady of Them All"	Mel McDaniel, Bob Morrison	3:10
5.	"We Had It All"	Troy Seals, Donnie Fritts	2:59
6.	"Georgia Keeps Pulling on My Ring"	Tim Marshall, David Wilkins	3:18
7.	"Your Love Had Taken Me That High"	Jack Dunham, Galen Raye	2:35
8.	"Over Thirty (Not Over the Hill)"	Bucky Jones	3:20
9.	"I Am the Dreamer (You Are the Dream)"	Russ Allison, Dallas Cody, Dave Hall	2:30
10.	"Red Neckin' Love Makin' Night"	Seals, Max D. Barnes	3:28

== Chart performance ==
Chart (1983)	Peak position
US Top Country Albums (Billboard)	57
