= Conway Twitty and Loretta Lynn discography =

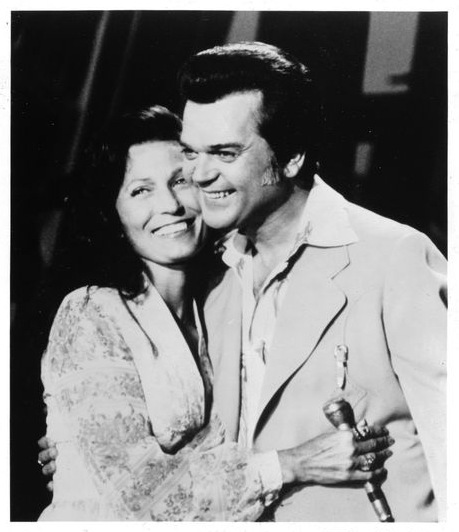
- Promotional image of Conway Twitty and Loretta Lynn in 1976.
- Studio albums: 10
- Compilation albums: 7
- Singles: 13
- B-sides: 2

The discography of Conway Twitty and Loretta Lynn consists of 10 studio albums, seven compilation albums, 13 singles, and two charted B-sides. While signed to Decca and MCA as solo artists, Twitty and Lynn charted 12 duet singles in the top ten of the Billboard Hot Country Singles chart, including five number one hits.

== Studio albums ==
| Title | Details | Peak chart positions | | | Certifications (sales thresholds) |
| Title | Details | US Country | US | CAN Country | Certifications (sales thresholds) |
|---|---|---|---|---|---|
| We Only Make Believe | Released: February 1, 1971; Label: Decca | 3 | 78 | — | RIAA: Gold |
| Lead Me On | Released: January 17, 1972; Label: Decca | 2 | 106 | — | RIAA: Gold |
| Louisiana Woman, Mississippi Man | Released: July 9, 1973; Label: MCA | 1 | 153 | — | |
| Country Partners | Released: June 10, 1974; Label: MCA | 1 | — | — | |
| Feelins' | Released: June 9, 1975; Label: MCA | 1 | — | — | |
| United Talent | Released: June 7, 1976; Label: MCA | 1 | — | — | |
| Dynamic Duo | Released: June 6, 1977; Label: MCA | 3 | — | — | |
| Honky Tonk Heroes | Released: June 26, 1978; Label: MCA | 8 | — | 2 | |
| Diamond Duet | Released: October 22, 1979; Label: MCA | 22 | — | — | |
| Two's a Party | Released: February 2, 1981; Label: MCA | 28 | — | — | |

== Compilations ==
| Title | Details | Peak chart positions | | Certifications (sales thresholds) |
| Title | Details | US Country | CAN Country | Certifications (sales thresholds) |
|---|---|---|---|---|
| The Very Best of Loretta and Conway | Released: 1979; Label: MCA Records | 19 | 16 | RIAA: Gold |
| Conway Twitty & Loretta Lynn | Released: 1984; Label: MCA Records | — | — | |
| 20 Greatest Hits | Released: 1987; Label: MCA Records | — | 38 | |
| Making Believe | Released: September 5, 1988; Label: MCA Records | 62 | — | |
| Country Gospel Greats | Released: 1992; Label: MCA Special Products | — | — | |
| 20th Century Masters: The Millennium Collection | Released: May 9, 2000; Label: MCA Nashville | — | — | |
| The Definitive Collection | Released: April 19, 2005; Label: MCA Nashville | — | — | |
"—" denotes releases that did not chart

== Singles ==
| Single | Year | Peak chart positions | | | | Certifications | Album |
| Single | Year | US Country | US | CAN Country | AU | Certifications | Album |
|---|---|---|---|---|---|---|---|
| "After the Fire Is Gone" | 1971 | 1 | 56 | 4 | — | — | We Only Make Believe |
| "Lead Me On" | 1971 | 1 | — | 1 | — | — | Lead Me On |
| "Louisiana Woman, Mississippi Man" | 1973 | 1 | — | 1 | — | RIAA: Gold | Louisiana Woman, Mississippi Man |
| "As Soon as I Hang Up the Phone" | 1974 | 1 | — | 1 | 57 | — | Country Partners |
| "Feelins'" | 1975 | 1 | — | 2 | — | — | Feelins' |
| "The Letter" | 1976 | 3 | — | 1 | — | — | United Talent |
| "I Can't Love You Enough" | 1977 | 2 | — | 1 | — | — | Dynamic Duo |
| "From Seven Till Ten" | 1978 | 6 | — | 2 | — | — | Honky Tonk Heroes |
| "You Know Just What I'd Do" | 1979 | 9 | — | 5 | — | — | Diamond Duet |
| "It's True Love" | 1980 | 5 | — | 2 | — | — | Diamond Duet |
| "Lovin' What Your Lovin' Does to Me" | 1981 | 7 | — | 5 | — | — | Two's a Party |
| "I Still Believe in Waltzes" | 1981 | 2 | — | 3 | — | — | Two's a Party |
| "Making Believe" | 1988 | — | — | — | — | — | Making Believe |
"—" denotes releases that did not chart

== Charted B-sides ==
| Title | Year | Peak positions | Original A-side |
| Title | Year | US Country | Original A-side |
|---|---|---|---|
| "You're the Reason Our Kids Are Ugly" | 1978 | flip | "From Seven Till Ten" |
| "The Sadness of It All" | 1979 | flip | "You Know Just What I'd Do" |

== See also ==
- Conway Twitty discography
- Loretta Lynn albums discography
- Loretta Lynn singles discography
