= Number Ones (Conway Twitty album) =

Greatest hits album by Conway Twitty
- Released: 1982
- Genre: Country
- Length: 31:23
- Label: MCA
- Producer: Conway Twitty; David Barnes; Owen Bradley; Ron Chancey

Conway Twitty chronology
Mr. T (1982)	Number Ones (1982)	Southern Comfort (1982)

Number Ones is a compilation album by American country music artist Conway Twitty. It was released in 1982 via MCA Records.

== Track listing ==
No.	Title	Writer(s)	Length
1.	"Rest Your Love on Me"	Barry Gibb	3:57
2.	"Touch the Hand"	Conway Twitty, Ron Peterson	3:20
3.	"Boogie Grass Band"	Ronnie Reno	2:19
4.	"A Bridge That Just Won't Burn"	Roger Murrah, Jim McBride	2:48
5.	"I May Never Get to Heaven"	Bill Anderson, Buddy Killen	2:47
6.	"I'd Love to Lay You Down"	Johnny MacRae	3:19
7.	"Happy Birthday Darlin'"	Chuck Howard	2:50
8.	"I See the Want To in Your Eyes"	Wayne Carson	2:47
9.	"Don't Take It Away"	Troy Seals, Max D. Barnes	3:40
10.	"I've Never Seen the Likes of You"	Bob McDill, Wayland Holyfield	2:50

== Chart performance ==
Chart (1982)	Peak position
US Top Country Albums (Billboard)	20
