= Linda on My Mind =

Linda on My Mind refers to:

- Linda on My Mind (album), by Conway Twitty, 1975
  - "Linda on My Mind" (song), from the album
