= Ruth Buzzi =

American actress and comedian (1936–2025)

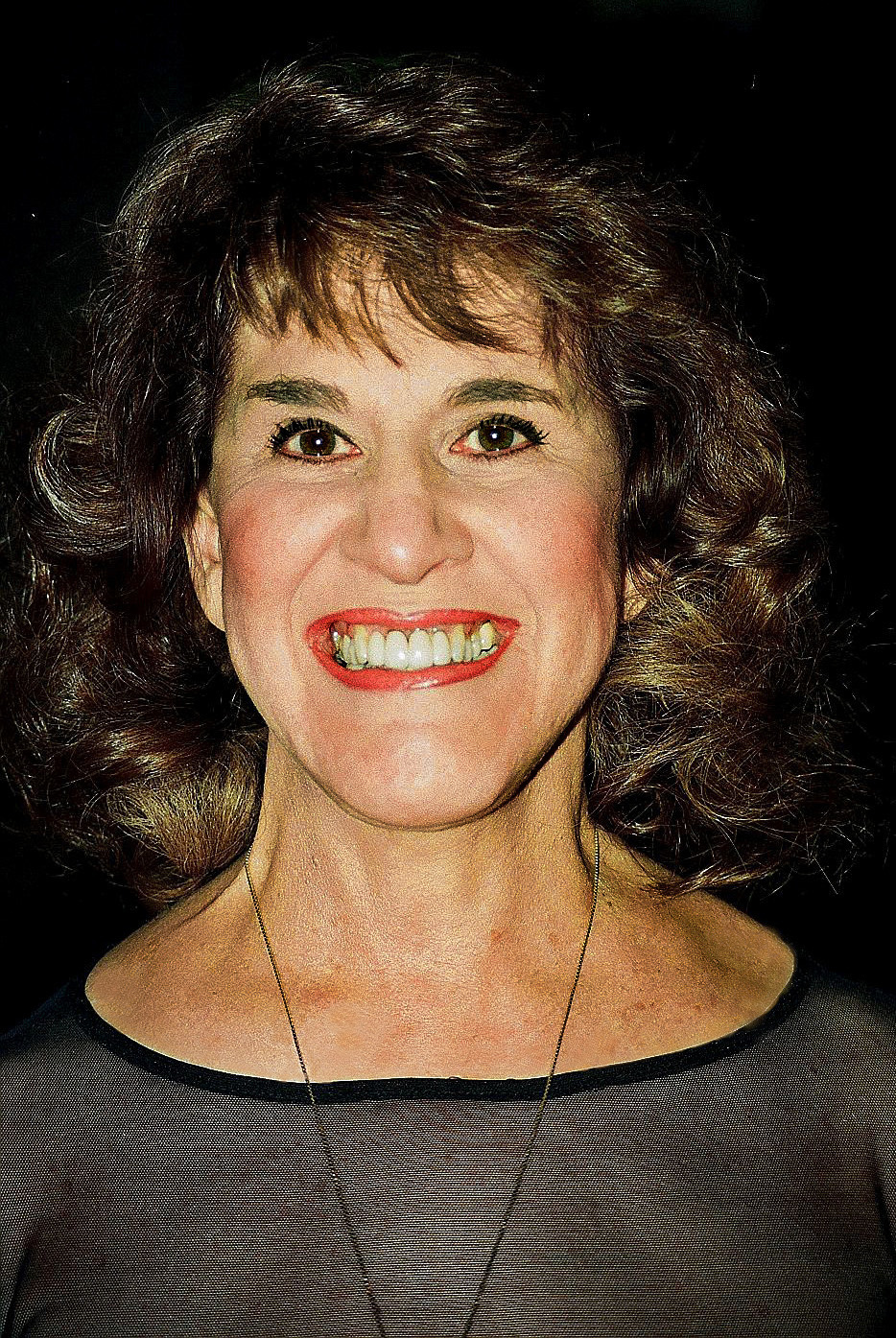
- Buzzi in 1996
- Born: Ruth Ann Buzzi; July 24, 1936; Westerly, Rhode Island, U.S.
- Died: May 1, 2025 (aged 88); Stephenville, Texas, U.S.
- Occupations: Actress; comedian; singer
- Years active: 1956–2021
- Spouses: Basil Peter Keko (m. 1965; div. 1975) Kent Perkins (m. 1978)

Ruth Ann Buzzi (/ˈbʌzi/ BUZ-ee; July 24, 1936 – May 1, 2025) was an American actress, singer and comedian. She appeared on stage, in films, and on television. She was best known for her performances on the comedy-variety show Rowan & Martin's Laugh-In from 1968 to 1973, for which she won a Golden Globe Award and received five Emmy nominations.

== Early life ==
Buzzi was born July 24, 1936, in Westerly, Rhode Island, the daughter of Rena Pauline and Angelo Peter Buzzi, a nationally recognized stone sculptor. Her father, who came from a Swiss family, immigrated from Arzo, Switzerland, in 1923. She was raised in the village of Wequetequock in the town of Stonington, Connecticut, in a stone house overlooking the ocean at Wequetequock Cove, where her father owned Buzzi Memorials, a business that her older brother Harold operated until his retirement in 2013.

Buzzi attended Stonington High School, where she was head cheerleader. At age 18, she moved across the country to enroll at the Pasadena Playhouse College of Theatre Arts, where her classmates included Dustin Hoffman and Gene Hackman. She graduated with honors in June 1957.

== Career ==
=== Early successes ===
Before graduation from college, Buzzi was already a working union actress performing in musical and comedy revues. Her first job in show business was at 19, traveling with singer Rudy Vallée in a live musical and comedy act during her summer break from college; it allowed her to graduate with an Actors' Equity Association union card. She moved to New York City after graduation and was hired immediately for a lead role in an off-Broadway musical revue, the first of 19 in which she performed around the East Coast. She worked alongside other young performers just beginning their careers at the time, including Barbra Streisand, Joan Rivers, Dom DeLuise, and Carol Burnett. She performed in New York musical variety shows, and she made numerous television commercials, some of which won national awards including the Clio Award.

Her first national recognition on television came on The Garry Moore Show in 1964, shortly after Carol Burnett was replaced by Dorothy Loudon on the series. She performed as "Shakundala the Silent", a bumbling magician's assistant to her comedy partner Dom DeLuise, who played "Dominic the Great". Buzzi was a member of the regular repertory company on the CBS variety show The Entertainers (1964–65). In 1966–67, she appeared in Sweet Charity with Gwen Verdon in the original cast (playing three small parts: "The Good Fairy", "Woman with Hat", "Receptionist").

=== On Laugh-In and related work ===
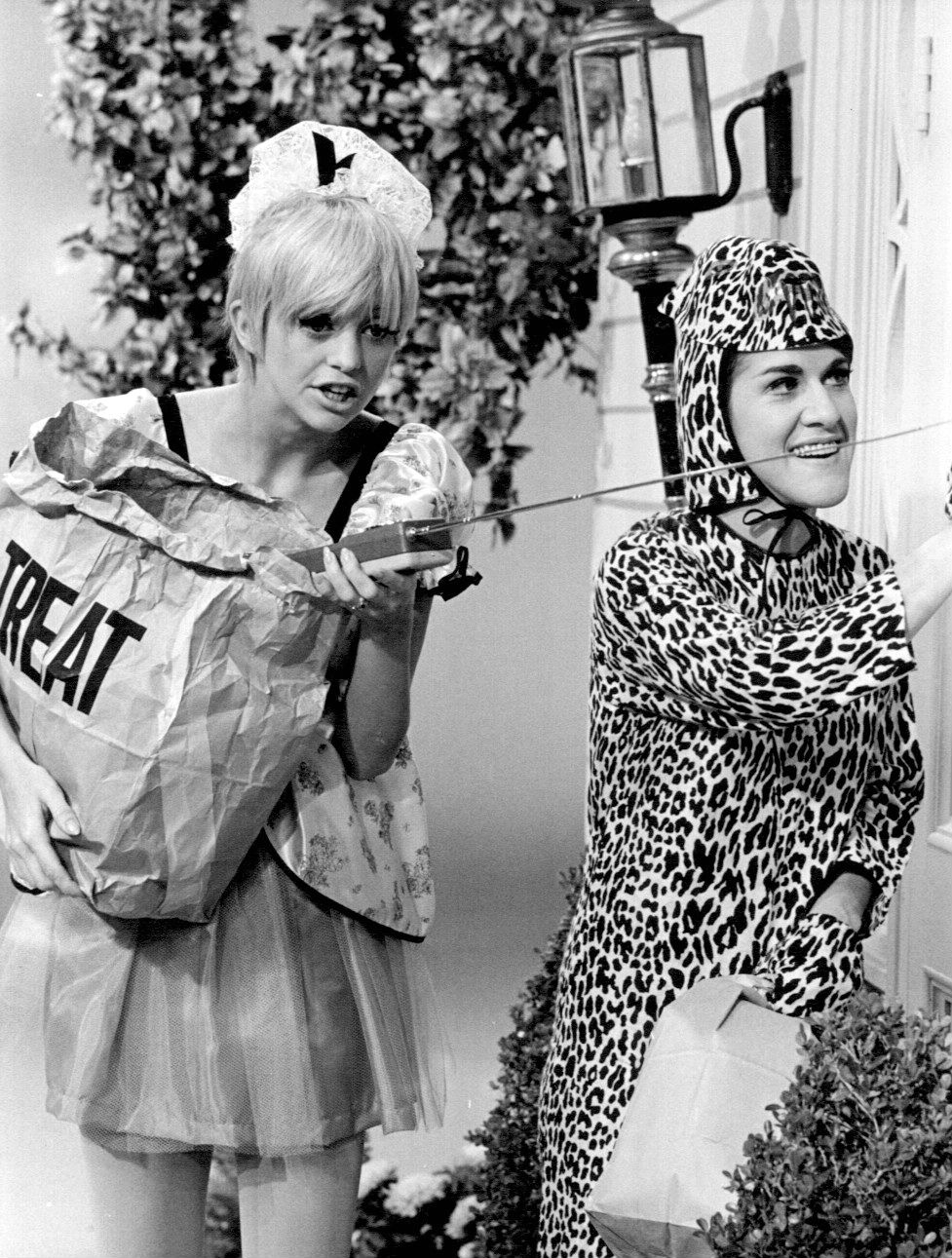
Ruth Buzzi with Goldie Hawn in a trick-or-treat skit on Rowan & Martin's Laugh-In, October 1968

In 1967, Buzzi appeared in all eight episodes of The Steve Allen Comedy Hour, a variety series starring Steve Allen. Her character parts in the Allen sketches led her to be cast for NBC's new show Rowan and Martin's Laugh-In. She was the only featured player to appear in every episode of Laugh-In including the pilot for the show and the Laugh-In television special. Among her recurring characters on Laugh-In were Flicker Farkle, youngest of the Farkle family; Busy-Buzzi, a Hedda Hopper–type Hollywood gossip columnist; Doris Swizzler, a cocktail-lounge habituée who always got smashed with husband Leonard (Dick Martin); and one of the Burbank Airlines Stewardesses, inconsiderate flight attendants.

Buzzi was probably best known for her role as "spinster" Gladys Ormphby, clad in drab brown with her bun hairdo covered by a visible hairnet knotted in the middle of her forehead. She first used this look when playing Agnes Gooch in a summer stock production of Auntie Mame. In most sketches, her purse was used as a weapon, with which she would flail away vigorously at anyone who incurred her wrath. She most often was the unwilling object of the advances of Arte Johnson's "dirty old man" character Tyrone F. Horneigh. NBC collectively called these two characters The Nitwits when they went to animation in the mid-1970s as part of the series Baggy Pants and the Nitwits. Buzzi and Johnson both voiced their respective roles in the cartoon.

Buzzi appeared as Gladys in many of the NBC Dean Martin Celebrity Roasts from the MGM Grand Hotel in Las Vegas, ranting about notable roastees including Muhammad Ali, Frank Sinatra, and Lucille Ball. In each case, Gladys pugnaciously attacked the honoree with her purse, and she would also hit Martin when he invariably made disparaging remarks about her looks and her romantic prospects.

=== Continued success on television ===
Buzzi was featured on the second season on the comedy That Girl as Marlo Thomas's friend Margie "Pete" Peterson. She starred with Jim Nabors as the time-traveling androids Fi and Fum in The Lost Saucer produced by Sid and Marty Krofft which aired from September 11, 1975, until September 2, 1976 (16 episodes). In 1979, she co-starred on the Canadian children's comedy show You Can't Do That on Television (also known as Whatever Turns You On).

Dean Martin's producer Greg Garrison hired her for his comedy specials starring Dom DeLuise. She recorded the single "You Oughta Hear the Song" in 1977 which reached number 90 on Billboard's national Country Music chart; Buzzi joked in 2022 in hindsight: "Here's a medley of my hit song: I'd like to thank the millions and millions of you who didn't buy a copy. I got to spend quality time at home in '78 instead of standing in front of all those aggravating audiences."

Buzzi was a guest star on many television series: as Chloe, the wife of phone company worker Henry Beesmeyer (Marvin Kaplan) on Alice (1981); on Down to Earth (1985); Donny & Marie; The Flip Wilson Show; The Dean Martin Music and Comedy Hour; the Dean Martin Roasts; The Carol Burnett Show; Tony Orlando and Dawn; The Monkees; Emergency!; and variety series hosted by Leslie Uggams and Glen Campbell. She also appeared occasionally on game shows and was a celebrity judge on The Gong Show. She appeared in Lucille Ball's last comedy show, Life with Lucy, as Mrs. Wilcox in the episode "Lucy Makes a Hit with John Ritter". She appeared eight times on The Tonight Show Starring Johnny Carson.

Buzzi voiced the character Nose Marie in the Hanna-Barbera animated series Pound Puppies (1986). She also voiced Mama Bear in Berenstain Bears (1985) and performed hundreds of guest voices for many other cartoon series, including The Smurfs, The Angry Beavers, and Mo Willems' Sheep in the Big City.

She joined the cast of Sesame Street in 1993 as a shopkeeper, Ruthie, as part of the "Around the Corner" set expansion. Ruthie ran Finders Keepers, which sold items previously owned by fairy tale and nursery rhyme characters. After the set was removed in 1999, she continued to appear on the show in inserts, usually in costume as other characters. She also voiced Suzie Kabloozie and her pet cat, Feff, in animated inserts that were shown on the show from 1994 to 2008. She reprised her role as Ruthie in Sesame Street Stays Up Late!, Sesame Street's All Star 25th Birthday: Stars and Street Forever, and Elmopalooza, as well as the direct-to-video production The Best of Elmo and the feature film The Adventures of Elmo in Grouchland.

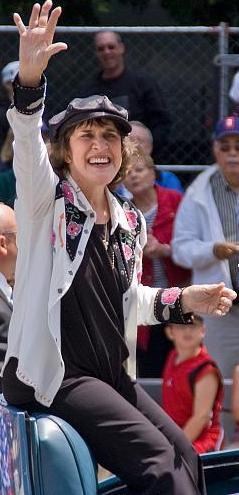
Buzzi in 2008

Buzzi appeared in the "Weird Al" Yankovic video "Gump" and similarly appeared in other music videos with the B-52's and the Presidents of the United States of America. She appeared on Saved by the Bell, The Muppet Show, two episodes of You Can't Do That on Television in 1979 (as well as the entire run of the You Can't Do That On Television's spinoff Whatever Turns You On), and numerous other television shows. She played the role of the eccentric Nurse Kravitz on NBC's daytime soap opera Passions. In 2006 and 2007, she made guest appearances on the children's TV series Come on Over. She had featured roles in more than 20 films, including Chu Chu and the Philly Flash, Freaky Friday, The North Avenue Irregulars, The Apple Dumpling Gang Rides Again, The Villain, The Being, Surf II, The Adventures of Elmo in Grouchland, and a number of westerns for the European market known as the Lucky Luke series in which she plays the mother of the Dalton Gang. In 2021, she retired from acting.

== Personal life, illness and death ==
Buzzi was a charter member of the Pasadena Playhouse Alumni Association. She painted as a hobby; however, she had never offered her oil paintings for sale to the public, choosing to donate original works to charity, where they sold in excess of $6,000.

Buzzi supported numerous children's charities, including Make a Wish Foundation, Special Olympics, the Thalians, St. Jude Children's Research Hospital, and Big Brothers Big Sisters of America, and she was a children's art summer camp sponsor through the Dallas Museum of Biblical Art. She was active in fundraising for the Utopia Animal Rescue Ranch in Medina Texas, and other animal causes.

Buzzi lived with her husband, actor Kent Perkins, on a 600-acre (240 ha) cattle and horse ranch near Stephenville, Texas. They were avid automobile collectors. Their collection focused on post-war English vehicles, including Bentley, Rolls-Royce, and Jaguar, although it also includes several American convertibles and muscle cars. Some of their cars have been donated or lent to the Petersen Automotive Museum in Los Angeles, including a red, fuel-injected 1957 Chevrolet convertible that was exhibited from 1993 to 2011 as part of the display honoring the cars of Steve McQueen. Buzzi's 1960 Rolls-Royce Silver Cloud drophead coupe convertible was on display for the "Century of Elegance" exhibit.

Buzzi was named in numerous songs, including House of Pain's "I'm a Swing It", The Bled's "Ruth Buzzi Better Watch Her Back", and the Loretta Lynn/Conway Twitty duet "You're the Reason Our Kids Are Ugly".

Buzzi was diagnosed with Alzheimer's disease in 2012. In July 2022, it was reported that Buzzi had suffered a series of strokes and was improving.

Buzzi died of complications from Alzheimer's disease during hospice care at her home, in Stephenville, Texas, on May 1, 2025, at age 88.

== Filmography ==
=== Film ===
Year	Title	Role	Notes
1969	It's Tough to Be a Bird	Soprano	Performs "When the Buzzards Return to Hinckley Ridge", a parody of "When the Swallows Come Back to Capistrano"
1970	The Aristocats	Frou-Frou	Singing voice
1976	Freaky Friday	Opposing Coach	
1977	The Rescuers	German Mouse	Voice; uncredited/unconfirmed
1978	Record City	Olga	
1979	The North Avenue Irregulars	Dr. Rheems	
1979	The Apple Dumpling Gang Rides Again	Old Tough Kate, aka 'Granny'	
1979	The Villain	Damsel in Distress	
1979	Skatetown, U.S.A.	Elvira	
1980	I Go Pogo	Miz Beaver / Miss Mam'selle Hepzibah	Voice
1981	Chu Chu and the Philly Flash	Consuelo	
1983	The Being	Virginia Lane	
1984	Surf II	Chuck's Mom	
1986	Bad Guys	Petal McGurk	
1988	Pound Puppies and the Legend of Big Paw	Nose Marie	Voice
1988	Dixie Lanes	Betty	
1989	Up Your Alley	Marilyn	
1989	My Mom's a Werewolf	Madame Gypsy	
1990	Wishful Thinking	Jody	
1990	Diggin' Up Business	Widow Knockerby	
1994	The Best of Elmo	Ruthie	Direct-to-video
1994	Troublemakers	Maw	
1999	The Adventures of Elmo in Grouchland	Ruthie	
2000	Nothing but the Truth	Lois Troy	
2004	Adventures in Homeschooling	Gertie Hemple	Short Film
2006	Fallen Angels	Perril	
2021	One Month Out	Agnes	Final film role before retirement

=== Television ===
Year	Title	Role	Notes
1964	The Garry Moore Show	Herself	season 6, episode 32
1964–1965	Linus the Lionhearted	Granny Goodwitch	3 episodes
1967–1973	Rowan and Martin's Laugh-In	Regular Performer	141 episodes
1967	The Steve Allen Comedy Hour	Herself	
1967	The Monkees	Mrs. Weatherspoon	S2:E11, "A Coffin Too Frequent"
1967–1968	That Girl	Pete Peterson	5 episodes
1968–1973	The Carol Burnett Show	Various characters	5 episodes
1969	That's Life		1 episode
1969	In Name Only	Ruth Clayton	TV movie
1970–1982	Walt Disney anthology television series	Granny	6 episodes
1970–1974	The Dean Martin Show	Herself	16 episodes
1970–1973	Love, American Style	Beverly	2 episodes
1971	Night Gallery	Hungry Witch	1 episode
1972	The Singles		TV movie, also starring Michele Lee and John Byner
1972	Here's Lucy	Annie Whipple	1 episode
1973–1976	Medical Center	Rose Jenkins	2 episodes
1974	Lotsa Luck	Wilma Wallachek	1 episode
1974	Paradise		TV movie, also starring Luther Adler
1974	ABC Afterschool Special	Cleaning Lady	1 episode
1975–1976	The Lost Saucer	Fi	16 episodes
1976	Emergency!	Amy Merkle	1 episode
1976	The Muppet Show	Guest Star	season one, episode 4
1977–1978	Baggy Pants and the Nitwits	Gladys	16 episodes
1977	Once Upon a Brothers Grimm	Queen Astrid	TV movie
1978–1987	The Love Boat	Herself	2 episodes
1979	Legends of the Superheroes	Aunt Minerva	Part Two of a Two Part TV Special
1979–1980	CHiPs		2 episodes
1979	Whatever Turns You On	Mother/Miss Fidt/Miss Take/Lois the Cafeteria Lady/Gladys the Makeup Girl/Script Girl/Old Lady	13 episodes
1980	Myra	Mrs. Paige	Animated Short
1981	Alice	Chloe	Henry's Bitter Half
1981	Aloha Paradise	Herself	1 episode
1982	Trapper John, M.D.	Laura Morley	1 episode
1983	Gun Shy	Mrs. Mound	1 episode
1983	Days of Our Lives	Leticia Bradford	unknown episodes
1983	Alvin and the Chipmunks		13 episodes
1984	Masquerade		1 episode
1984	Don't Ask Me, Ask God	Jonesey's Wife	TV movie, also starring Pat Robertson and Steve Allen
1985	Paw Paws	Aunt Pruney Paw	unknown episodes
1985	George Burns Comedy Week	Juliette	1 episode
1985–1987	The Berenstain Bears	Mama Bear	52 episodes
1985	The Jetsons	Grandma Ganymede	1 episode
1986	Check It Out!	Tiffany Cobb, Mrs. Cobb's Daughter	1 episode
1986	Life with Lucy	Mrs. Wilcox	1 episode
1986	Kids Incorporated: Rock in the New Year	Blanche	TV movie
1986–1987	Pound Puppies	Nose Marie	26 episodes
1987	Milroy, Santa's Misfit Mutt	Mrs. Claus (voice)	TV Short (also starring Buddy Ebsen)
1988	Rockin' with Judy Jetson	Felonia Funk (voice)	TV movie
1988–1990	The Munsters Today	Dracula's Mom	2 episodes
1988–1991	Out of This World	Mrs. Miller, Mabel T Stone	3 episodes
1989	Marvin: Baby of the Year	Chrissy's Mother (voice)	TV Short
1990	Chip 'n Dale Rescue Rangers	Mrs. Sweeney (voice)	1 episode
1990	Gravedale High	voice role	unknown episodes
1990	Saved by the Bell	Roberta Powers	1 episode
1991	They Came from Outer Space	Carol	1 episode
1991	The New Adam-12	Mrs. Woolridge	1 episode
1992	Lucky Ed's Tabloid News	Sample Lady	TV movie
1992	Darkwing Duck	Alien Crow (voice)	2 episodes
1992	Lucky Luke	Ma Dalton	1 episode
1992	Major Dad	Mattie Fae Tillman	1 episode
1993	I Yabba-Dabba Do!	Additional Voices	TV movie
1993	Wild West C.O.W.-Boys of Moo Mesa		1 episode
1993	Hollyrock-a-Bye Baby	Additional Voices	TV movie
1993	The Pink Panther		1 episode
1993–2008	Sesame Street	Ruthie, voice of Suzie Kabloozie and Feff, Gladys Ormphby, The Fairy Godplant	Buzzi played the role of Ruthie from 1993 to 2001 but segments featuring Suzie Kabloozie and Feff were repeated on the show until 2008.
1993	Sesame Street Stays Up Late!	Ruthie	
1993–1994	Cro	Nandy	20 episodes
1994	Sesame Street's All-Star 25th Birthday: Stars and Street Forever!	Ruthie	TV special
1995	Savage Dragon	Various Voices	unknown episodes
1997	The Jamie Foxx Show	Judge Lekeisha Roshanda Jackson	1 episode
1998	Sabrina the Teenage Witch	Delilah	S3:E6, "Good Will Haunting"
1998–2001	7th Heaven	Telephone Operator	2 episodes
1998	Elmopalooza	Ruthie	TV special
1999	Boys Will Be Boys	Mrs. Rudnick	TV movie, also starring Randy Travis and Mickey Rooney
1999	Diagnosis Murder	Liz Summers	1 episode
2000	Rocket Power	Dog Owner	1 episode
2000	100 Deeds for Eddie McDowd	Old Lady	1 episode
2000	The Angry Beavers	Mrs. Beaver	1 episode
2000–2001	Sheep in the Big City	Delilah	7 episodes
2003	Passions	Nurse Kravitz	2 episodes
2006–2007	Come on Over	Ruthie	2 episodes

== Awards ==
- She received three Primetime Emmy Award nominations and two Daytime Emmy Award Nominations. Her Primetime nominations were for Rowan & Martin's Laugh-In (1969 and 1972) and the Dean Martin Comedy Hour (1974); her Daytime nominations were for The Berenstain Bears (1987) and Sesame Street (1994). She won the 1973 Golden Globe Award for Best Supporting Actress - Television for her work on Rowan & Martin's Laugh-In.
- On November 22, 2014, Women in Film (Dallas, Texas chapter) awarded Buzzi their highest achievement honor, the Topaz Award, at their annual gala.
- She was inducted in 2002 into the NAB Broadcasting Hall of Fame, which bestowed the honor to the producers, director and entire cast of Rowan & Martin's Laugh-In
- In 1971, she was inducted into the Rhode Island Heritage Hall of Fame.
- Lifetime Achievement Award by the Pasadena Playhouse of the Performing Arts
- Clio Award for Best Spokesperson in a television commercial for her series of Clorox-2 commercials, and was among the first of only a few Caucasian women to ever win an NAACP Image Award
- Buzzi was named a "Distinguished Woman of Northwood" by the Board of Regents of Northwood University in 2008.
