= Fit to Be Tied Down =

Fit to Be Tied Down may refer to:

- "Fit to Be Tied Down", a song by Conway Twitty from the 1990 album Greatest Hits Volume III
- "Fit to Be Tied Down", a song by Sammy Kershaw from the 1996 album Politics, Religion and Her
