= List of Top Country LP's number ones of 1975 =

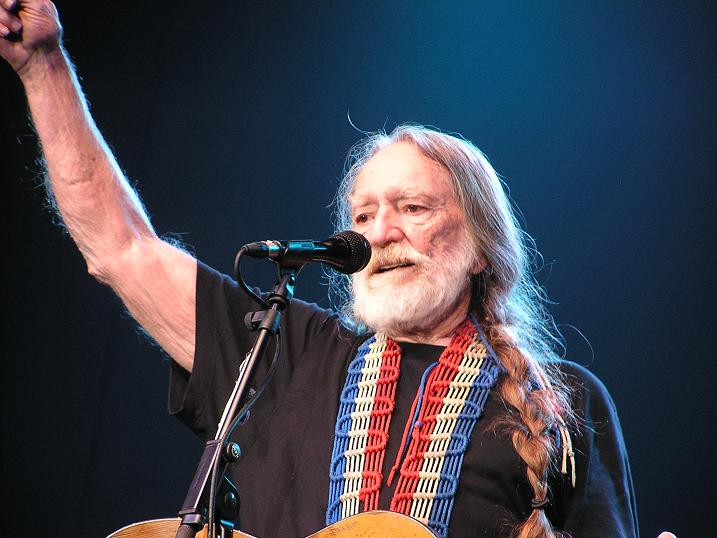
Willie Nelson's 1975 chart-topper Red Headed Stranger is regarded as his career breakthrough.

Top Country Albums is a chart that ranks the top-performing country music albums in the United States, published by Billboard. In 1975, 19 different albums topped the chart, which was at the time published under the title Top Country LP's, based on sales reports submitted by a representative sample of stores nationwide.

In the issue of Billboard dated January 4, John Denver was at number one with his album Back Home Again, its fourth week at number one. The following week it was displaced from the top spot by Charlie Rich's album The Silver Fox. Denver would return to number one in May with the live album An Evening with John Denver and again in December with Windsong, and was the only artist with three chart-topping albums in 1975. Rich and Freddy Fender each achieved two number ones, as did Conway Twitty, who topped the chart with his solo album Linda on My Mind as well as with Feelins', a collaboration with Loretta Lynn. The two singers had a run of success with duet recordings in the early 1970s alongside their ongoing solo careers. Fender's total of 11 weeks at number one was the most by any artist. Olivia Newton-John achieved the year's longest unbroken run atop the chart, spending six consecutive weeks in the peak position with Have You Never Been Mellow.

In September, Waylon Jennings had his first chart-topping album with Dreaming My Dreams. The following month, Willie Nelson topped the chart for the first time with Red Headed Stranger. Nelson had been active as a singer and songwriter since the 1960s and several of his songs had been chart-toppers for other artists, but his own recordings had not achieved great success prior to 1975. Despite having a sound very different to the lush country-pop prevalent at the time, Red Headed Stranger was a critical and commercial success and launched Nelson to stardom. In 2006, CMT placed it at the top of a list of the 40 greatest albums in country music. Jennings and Nelson were two of the mainstays of the nascent outlaw country movement, which rejected slick production values and added a rock music influence and a counterculture attitude. The year's final Top Country LP's number one was Black Bear Road by C. W. McCall, which moved into the top spot in the issue of Billboard dated December 27.

== Chart history ==
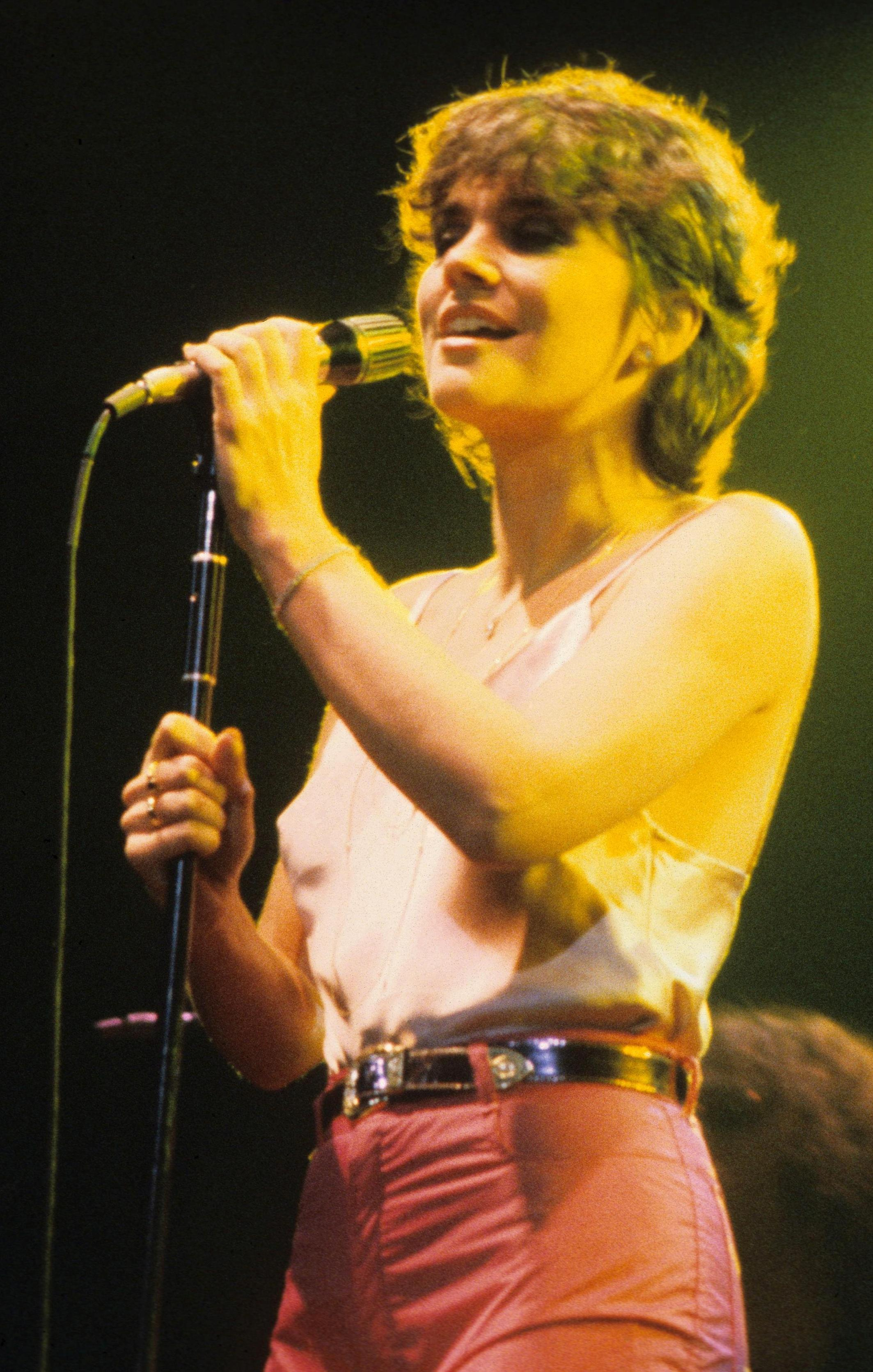
Linda Ronstadt spent four weeks at number one with Heart Like a Wheel.

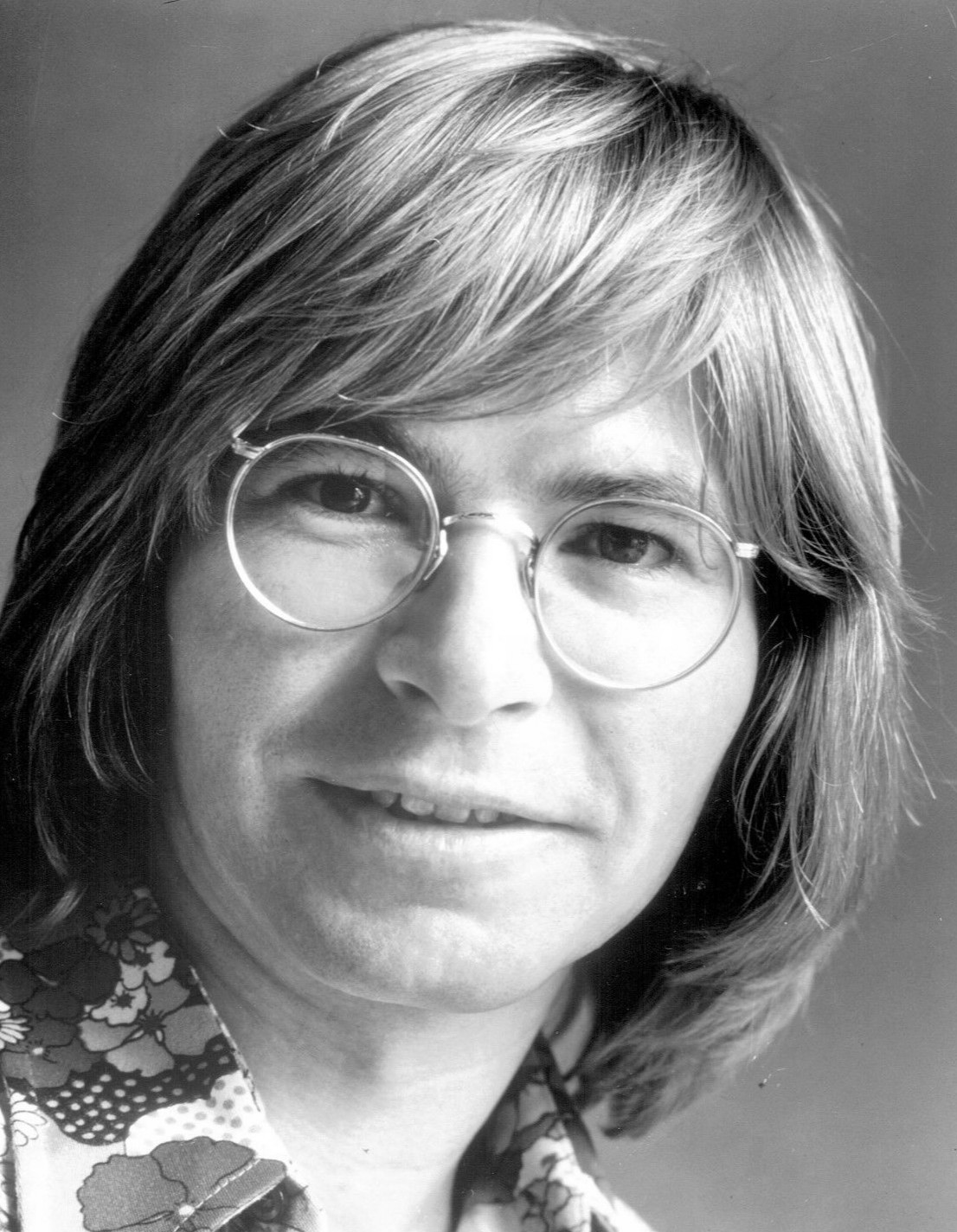
John Denver had three chart-topping albums in 1975.

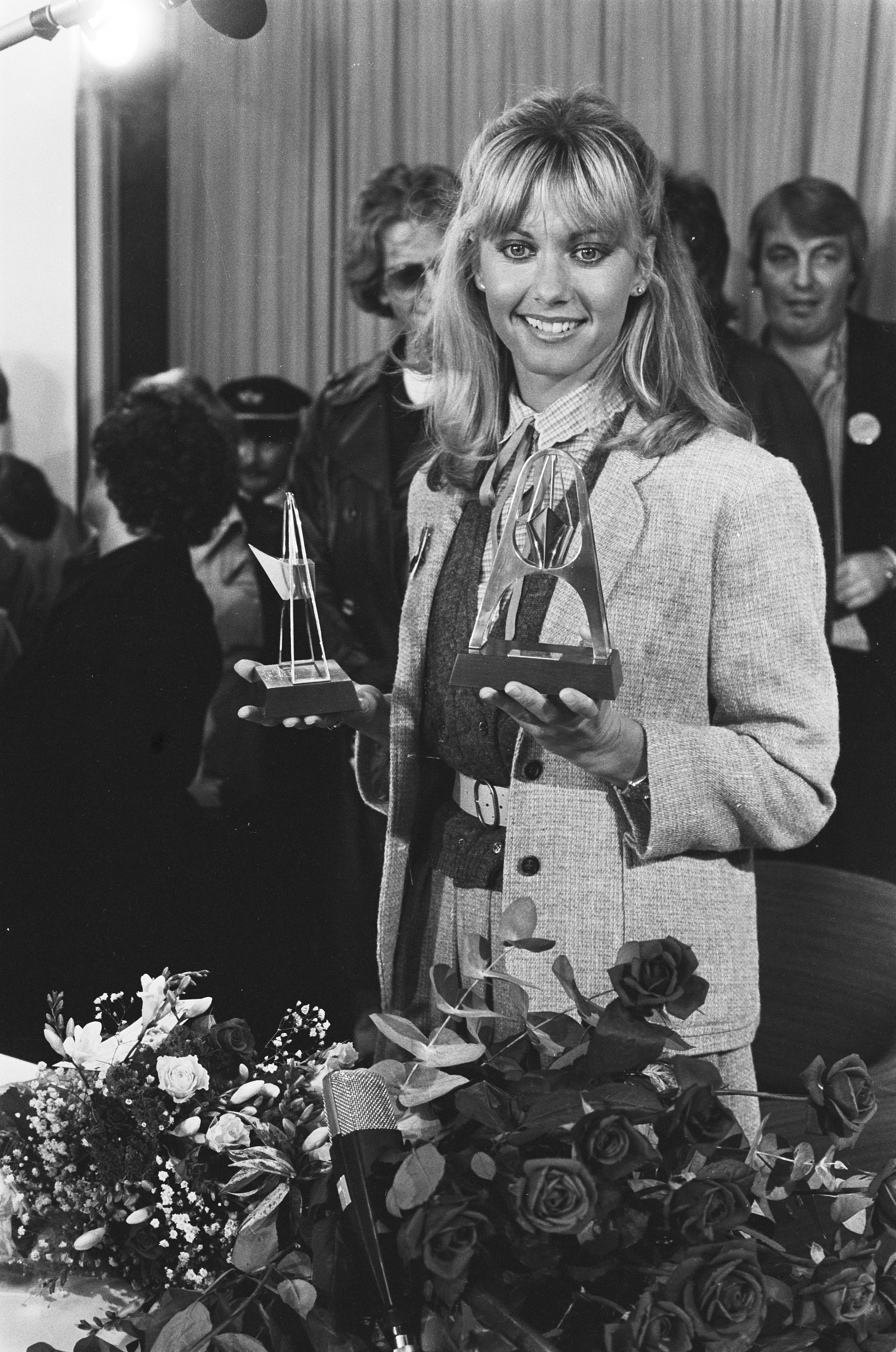
Olivia Newton-John's Have You Never Been Mellow was the year's longest-running number one.

Issue date	Title	Artist(s)	Ref.
January 4	Back Home Again	John Denver	
January 11	The Silver Fox	Charlie Rich	
January 18	I Can Help	Billy Swan	
January 25	I Can Help	Billy Swan	
February 1	City Lights	Mickey Gilley	
February 8	Heart Like a Wheel	Linda Ronstadt	
February 15	Heart Like a Wheel	Linda Ronstadt	
February 22	Heart Like a Wheel	Linda Ronstadt	
March 1	Heart Like a Wheel	Linda Ronstadt	
March 8	Promised Land	Elvis Presley	
March 15	Linda on My Mind	Conway Twitty	
March 22	Have You Never Been Mellow	Olivia Newton-John	
March 29	Have You Never Been Mellow	Olivia Newton-John	
April 5	Have You Never Been Mellow	Olivia Newton-John	
April 12	Have You Never Been Mellow	Olivia Newton-John	
April 19	Have You Never Been Mellow	Olivia Newton-John	
April 26	Have You Never Been Mellow	Olivia Newton-John	
May 3	An Evening with John Denver	John Denver	
May 10	An Evening with John Denver	John Denver	
May 17	Before the Next Teardrop Falls	Freddy Fender	
May 24	Before the Next Teardrop Falls	Freddy Fender	
May 31	Before the Next Teardrop Falls	Freddy Fender	
June 7	Before the Next Teardrop Falls	Freddy Fender	
June 14	Keep Movin' On	Merle Haggard and the Strangers	
June 21	Keep Movin' On	Merle Haggard and the Strangers	
June 28	Keep Movin' On	Merle Haggard and the Strangers	
July 5	Before the Next Teardrop Falls	Freddy Fender	
July 12	Before the Next Teardrop Falls	Freddy Fender	
July 19	Keep Movin' On	Merle Haggard and the Strangers	
July 26	Before the Next Teardrop Falls	Freddy Fender	
August 2	Before the Next Teardrop Falls	Freddy Fender	
August 9	Before the Next Teardrop Falls	Freddy Fender	
August 16	Feelins'	Conway Twitty and Loretta Lynn	
August 23	Every Time You Touch Me (I Get High)	Charlie Rich	
August 30	Every Time You Touch Me (I Get High)	Charlie Rich	
September 6	Dreaming My Dreams	Waylon Jennings	
September 13	Rhinestone Cowboy	Glen Campbell	
September 20	Rhinestone Cowboy	Glen Campbell	
September 27	Rhinestone Cowboy	Glen Campbell	
October 4	Red Headed Stranger	Willie Nelson	
October 11	Red Headed Stranger	Willie Nelson	
October 18	Red Headed Stranger	Willie Nelson	
October 25	Windsong	John Denver	
November 1	Windsong	John Denver	
November 8	Windsong	John Denver	
November 15	Windsong	John Denver	
November 22	Windsong	John Denver	
November 29	Red Headed Stranger	Willie Nelson	
December 6	Red Headed Stranger	Willie Nelson	
December 13	Are You Ready for Freddy?	Freddy Fender	
December 20	Are You Ready for Freddy?	Freddy Fender	
December 27	Black Bear Road	C. W. McCall	
