= J. Remington Wilde =

- Born: Jay Douglas Bader; September 9, 1951; Monticello, Iowa, US
- Origin: Cedar Rapids, Iowa, US
- Died: July 20, 2024 (aged 72) Cedar Rapids, Iowa, U.S.
- Occupation: Songwriter
- Years active: 1976–20??

J. Remington Wilde (September 9, 1951 – July 20, 2024), was born in Monticello, Iowa and began his professional career as a songwriter in Nashville, TN in 1977. He signed his first contract as a professional songwriter with ATV Music Group (now Sony Music Publishing) in 1979. His songs have been recorded by many Country and Pop artists, including the title cut of the Ray Charles 1986 album “From The Pages Of My Mind”, which was a Billboard chart single in 1986. The song also appears on the Ray Charles “Complete Country and Western Recordings 1959-1986” album. Wilde also co-wrote the title cut of the Conway Twitty 1982 album Dream Maker and other songs on albums including the song "Of All The Hearts" on the Gary Allan 1996 album Used Heart for Sale, the song "Headin' For A Heartache" on the Juice Newton 1981 album Juice” which earned Juice Newton two Grammy Nominations in 1981, was certified Gold and later became Platinum on January 5, 1982. The song "Headin' For A Heartache" also became the B-Side to Juice's huge hit "Angel Of The Morning. Wilde also co-wrote the Clint Eastwood / Randy Travis duet "Smokin' The Hive" on the Randy Travis 1990 #1 Country album Heroes & Friends. His songs have been recorded by numerous indie artists, and have been in several feature films including White Palace starring Susan Sarandon, James Spader, and Kathy Bates.
