= Making Believe (album) =

Compilation album by Conway Twitty and Loretta Lynn
- Released: September 5, 1988
- Recorded: March 7, 1973–November 3, 1987
- Studio: Bradley's Barn, Mount Juliet, Tennessee
- Genre: Country
- Length: 27:55
- Label: MCA
- Producer: Jimmy Bowen; Owen Bradley; David Barnes; Conway Twitty; Loretta Lynn

Conway Twitty and Loretta Lynn chronology
Two's a Party (1981)	Making Believe (1988)

Conway Twitty chronology
Still in Your Dreams (1988)	Making Believe (1988)	House on Old Lonesome Road (1989)

Loretta Lynn chronology
Who Was That Stranger (1988)	Making Believe (1988)	Honky Tonk Angels (1993)

Singles from Making Believe
- 1. "Making Believe" Released: September 1988

Making Believe is a compilation album by Conway Twitty and Loretta Lynn. It was released on September 5, 1988, by MCA Records. It was the last album release to feature new material by the duo. The album is made up of five previously unreleased songs and five songs from previous albums.

== Critical reception ==
Billboard published a review in the September 17, 1988 issue which said, "A bright—if patchwork—project, this offers one side of new recordings of old standards and another of previously released duet material, some of which dates back to 1973."

== Commercial performance ==
The album peaked at No. 62 on the US Billboard Hot Country Albums chart, becoming the duo's lowest position on the chart.

The album's only single, "Making Believe", was released in September 1988 and is the duo's only single to not appear on any music charts.

== Track listing ==
Side one
No.	Title	Writer(s)	Length
1.	"Making Believe"	Jimmy Work	3:43
2.	"I Can't Help It (If I'm Still in Love with You)"	Hank Williams	2:33
3.	"Faded Love"	Bob Wills; John Wills	2:53
4.	"Half as Much"	Curley Williams	2:12
5.	"Please Help Me I'm Falling in Love"	Don Robertson; Hal Blair	2:42

Side two
No.	Title	Writer(s)	Length
1.	"Hey Good Lookin'" (from Dynamic Duo)	H. Williams	2:32
2.	"Release Me" (from Louisiana Woman, Mississippi Man)	Eddie Miller; Dub Williams; Robert Yount	2:56
3.	"Back Home Again" (from Feelins')	John Denver	3:53
4.	"As Soon as I Hang Up the Phone" (from Country Partners)	Conway Twitty	2:40
5.	"It's True Love" (from Diamond Duet)	Randy Goodrum	2:51

== Charts ==
Chart (1988)	Peak chart position
US Hot Country Albums (Billboard)	62
