= Joni Lee =

American country music singer (born 1957)

- Also known as: Joni Penn
- Born: Joni Lee Jenkins; July 2, 1957 (age 68); Helena, Arkansas, U.S.
- Origin: Nashville, Tennessee
- Genres: Country music
- Occupation: Singer
- Instrument: Vocals
- Years active: 1975–1978
- Labels: MCA
- Spouse: John Wesley Ryles

Joni Lee Ryles (née Jenkins; born July 2, 1957) is an American country music singer. The daughter of Conway Twitty, she recorded several singles as Joni Penn. Her most successful solo single was "I'm Sorry Charlie", which peaked at number 16 on Hot Country Songs. The song was included on a self-titled album for MCA Records in 1976. Lee also sang with her father on "Touch the Hand" and "Don't Cry Joni" on his album The High Priest of Country Music, but she was not credited on the charts for either.

Ryles was married to country singer and session vocalist John Wesley Ryles.

== Discography ==
=== Albums ===
Title	Album details	Peak chart positions
Title	Album details	US Country
Joni Lee	Release date: 1976; Label: MCA Records	43

=== Singles ===
Year	Single	Peak chart positions	Album
Year	Single	US Country	Album
1975	"I'm Sorry Charlie"	16	Joni Lee
1976	"Angel on My Shoulder"	42	Joni Lee
1976	"Baby Love"	62	Joni Lee
1977	"The Reason Why I'm Here"	97	—
1978	"I Love How You Love Me"	94	—

=== Guest singles (uncredited) ===
Year	Single	Artist(s)	Peak chart positions				Album
Year	Single	Artist(s)	US Country	US	CAN Country	CAN	Album
1975	"Touch the Hand"	Conway Twitty	1	—	8	—	The High Priest of Country Music
1975	"Don't Cry Joni"	Conway Twitty	4	63	2	94	The High Priest of Country Music
