= Come On Over (TV series) =

American children's television series

Come on Over is a children's television series produced by the Grand Rapids Children's Museum in association with Enthusiastic Productions. The series was created by Joel Schoon Tanis, and is executive produced by Tanis, Patrick W. Ziegler, and Teresa L. Thome of the Museum. The mission of the show is to "inspire creativity and imagination in children".

The program is filmed in the state-of-the-art TV studio of the Martha Miller Center at Hope College in Holland, Michigan. It premiered in Grand Rapids, Michigan on ABC affiliate, WOTV, in fall 2006.

The show also features the tunes of Pint Size Music, former members of the Holland band, The Voice, such as Chad Dykema and Paul Chamness. To date, the show has won twelve regional Emmy awards.

It was also broadcast on the Australian Christian Channel in Australia.

== Featured actors ==
- Joel Schoon Tanis as Joel
- Brandy McClendon as Brandy
- Jean Reed Bahle as Grandma Zippy
- Chip Duford as Mr. Flabbinjaw
- Lisa Buckley as Hedge
- Greg Rogers as Random Guy
- Fred Stella as Brandy's Dad
- Edye Evans Hyde as Ms. Lucy
- Michael Ziegler as Laticia
- Hector the dog

== Guest appearances ==
- Luis Avalos as Beekeeper Luis
- Ruth Buzzi as Beekeeper Ruthie
- Vicki Lewis as Actress Vicki
- Gregory Jbara as Director Greg
- Dana Snyder as Dr. Fulovit
- Fred Willard as Dr. Fred Silliness
- Erik Per Sullivan as Young Luis
- Stephen Mason as Super Cool Guitar Player Steve
- Mindy Sterling as Grandy
- Kara McCoy as Lydia

== Episodes ==
No.	Title	Original release date
1	"Let's Wrap Something in Tinfoil"	November 20, 2006
2	"Making Music"	November 21, 2006
3	"Express Yourself"	November 22, 2006
4	"Brandy's Grandy"	November 23, 2006
5	"Joy's Lost Pet"	November 24, 2006
6	"Working Together is Super Duper"	January 8, 2007
7	"Puppet Guts"	January 9, 2007
8	"Mi Mi Mi Mi"	January 10, 2007
9	"Dance Fever"	January 11, 2007
10	"Scaredy Pants"	January 12, 2007
11	"Laughter is the Best Medicine"	May 14, 2007
12	"Beeeees!"	May 15, 2007
13	"Brothers and Sisters"	May 16, 2007
14	"Moods"	May 17, 2007
15	"Brainfreeze"	May 18, 2007
16	"Thespians"	April 7, 2008
17	"Tortoise and the Hare"	April 8, 2008
18	"Boreditis"	April 9, 2008
19	"Eat Right, Exercise and Play"	April 10, 2008
20	"Bubbles, Bubbles, Bubbles!"	April 11, 2008
21	"Go Green"	January 26, 2009
22	"Surprise! It's Your Birthday"	January 27, 2009
23	"Storytelling"	January 28, 2009
