= Fallin' for You for Years (album) =

Studio album by Conway Twitty
- Released: 1986
- Recorded: 1986
- Genre: Country
- Length: 32:50
- Label: Warner Bros. Records
- Producer: Conway Twitty, Dee Henry, Ron Treat

Conway Twitty chronology
Chasin' Rainbows (1985)	Fallin' for You for Years (1986)	Borderline (1987)

Singles from Fallin' for You for Years
- 1. "Desperado Love" Released: June 1986; 2. "Fallin' for You for Years" Released: October 18, 1986

Fallin' for You for Years is the fifty-first studio album by American country music singer Conway Twitty. The album was released in 1986 by Warner Bros. Records. The album was his last for the label, and also contained his 35th and final #1 country hit, "Desperado Love".

== Track listing ==
No.	Title	Writer(s)	Length
1.	"A Thing of the Past"	J. D. Martin, Gary Harrison	3:41
2.	"Desperado Love"	Michael Garvin, Sammy Johns	2:22
3.	"Steady as She Goes"	Chris Waters, Bucky Jones	3:25
4.	"Fallin' for You for Years"	Mike Reid, Troy Seals	4:39
5.	"Riverboat Gamblers"	Donny Kees, Jimmy Jay	4:05
6.	"Jennifer Johnson and Me"	Shel Silverstein, Fred Koller	3:07
7.	"You're the Best I Never Had"	Joe Chambers, Larry Jenkins	3:56
8.	"You Can't Say I Haven't Tried"	John Moffat	2:42
9.	"If I Didn't Love You"	Jon Vezner, Jackie White	3:03
10.	"Only the Shadows Know"	Phil Earhart, Terry Feller	2:31
Total length:			32:50

== Charts ==
Chart (1986)	Peak position
US Top Country Albums (Billboard)	37
