= Still in Your Dreams =

Studio album by Conway Twitty
- Released: 1988
- Recorded: 1987
- Studios: Sound Stage Studios Nashville, TN
- Genre: Country
- Length: 33:08
- Label: MCA Records
- Producers: Conway Twitty, Dee Henry, Jimmy Bowen

Conway Twitty chronology
Borderline (1987)	Still in Your Dreams (1988)	House on Old Lonesome Road (1989)

Singles from Still in Your Dreams
- 1. "Goodbye Time" Released: February 1988; 2. "Saturday Night Special" Released: June 1988; 3. "I Wish I Was Still in Your Dreams" Released: November 26, 1988

Still in Your Dreams is the fifty-third studio album by American country music singer Conway Twitty. The album was released in 1988, by MCA Records.

== Track listing ==
No.	Title	Writer(s)	Length
1.	"I Wish I Was Still in Your Dreams"	John Barlow Jarvis, Don Cook	3:21
2.	"Your Loving Side"	Roger Murrah, John Schweers, Carson Whitsett	3:04
3.	"Goodbye Time"	Murrah, James Dean Hicks	3:26
4.	"If You Were Mine to Lose"	Conway Twitty	2:45
5.	"Throwing Good Love After Bad"	Mike Anthony, Michael P. Heeney	3:12
6.	"Saturday Night Special"	Larry Bastian, Dewayne Blackwell	3:18
7.	"I Don't Remember Going Crazy"	Dave Robbins, Larry Keith	3:36
8.	"They Only Come Out at Night"	Walt Aldridge, John Jarrard, Lisa Palas	3:23
9.	"Jenny's Souvenirs"	Billy Swan, Don Henry	3:15
10.	"When You're Cool (The Sun Shines All the Time)"	Kevin Welch, Hank DeVito, Gary Nicholson	3:48
Total length:			33:08

== Personnel ==
- Eddie Bayers - drums
- Richard Bennett - acoustic guitar
- Vince Gill - background vocals
- David Hungate - bass guitar
- Mike Lawler - organ, synthesizer
- Matt Rollings - DX-7, piano
- Conway Twitty - lead vocals
- Reggie Young - electric guitar

== Charts ==
Chart (1988)	Peak position
US Top Country Albums (Billboard)	28
