= Dream Maker (album) =

Studio album by Conway Twitty
- Released: 1982
- Recorded: 1982
- Genre: Country
- Length: 33:33
- Label: Elektra Records
- Producer: Conway Twitty, Jimmy Bowen

Conway Twitty chronology
Conway's #1 Classics, Volume One (1982)	Dream Maker (1982)	Conway's #1 Classics, Volume Two (1982)

Singles from Dream Maker
- 1. "We Did But Now You Don't" Released: September 18, 1982; 2. "The Rose" Released: January 17, 1983

Dream Maker is the forty-fifth studio album by American country music singer Conway Twitty. The album was released in 1982, by Elektra Records.

== Track listing ==
No.	Title	Writer(s)	Length
1.	"The Rose"	Amanda McBroom	3:32
2.	"We Did But Now You Don't"	Pat McManus, Woody Bomar, Berni Clifford	3:57
3.	"A Good Love Died Tonight"	Roger Murrah	2:38
4.	"In My Dreams"	Rafe Van Hoy, Don Cook	2:59
5.	"One on One"	Ron Moore	3:25
6.	"Just When I Needed You Most"	Randy VanWarmer	3:36
7.	"Close Enough to Love"	Ben Peters	3:33
8.	"Burn Georgia Burn (There's a Fire in Your Soul)"	Jim Elliott	2:41
9.	"In My Eyes"	Barbara Wyrick	3:44
10.	"Dream Maker"	Byron Hill, J. Remington Wilde	3:00
Total length:			33:33

== Charts ==
Chart (1982)	Peak position
US Top Country Albums (Billboard)	15
