= Rest Your Love on Me (album) =

Studio album by Conway Twitty
- Released: 1980
- Recorded: 1980
- Genre: Country
- Label: MCA Records
- Producer: Conway Twitty, Ron Chancey

Conway Twitty chronology
| Heart & Soul (1980) | Rest Your Love on Me (1980) | Mr. T (1981) |

Singles from Rest Your Love on Me
- 1. "A Bridge That Just Won't Burn" Released: 1980; 2. "Rest Your Love on Me" / "I Am the Dreamer (You Are the Dream)" Released: February 21, 1981

Rest Your Love on Me is the forty-second studio album by American country music singer Conway Twitty. The album was released in 1980, by MCA Records.

== Track listing ==
| No. | Title | Writer(s) | Length |
|---|---|---|---|
| 1. | "I Still Believe in Waltzes" | Johnny MacRae, Bob Morrison, Michael Dennis Hughes | 3:07 |
| 2. | "Once Is Not Enough Kind of Love" | Dobie Gray, Troy Seals, Eddie Setser | 3:45 |
| 3. | "Hero for a Day" | Wayne Carson, Ronnie Reno | 2:33 |
| 4. | "I Am the Dreamer (You Are the Dream)" | Russ Allison, Dallas Cody, David Hall | 2:30 |
| 5. | "Rest Your Love on Me" | Barry Gibb | 4:22 |
| 6. | "For All the Right Reasons" | Billy Ray Reynolds, Marie Barrett Hartford | 3:47 |
| 7. | "We're Gonna Try It Tonight" | Linda Hargrove, Pam Rose, Mary Ann Kennedy | 2:51 |
| 8. | "You'll Be Back (Every Night in My Dreams)" | Johnny Russell, Wayland Holyfield | 2:37 |
| 9. | "A Bridge That Just Won't Burn" | Roger Murrah, Jim McBride | 2:48 |
| 10. | "When the Feelin's Right" | Lewis Anderson | 2:38 |

== Charts ==
=== Weekly charts ===
| Chart (1980) | Peak position |
|---|---|
| US Top Country Albums (Billboard) | 12 |

=== Year-end charts ===
| Chart (1981) | Position |
|---|---|
| US Top Country Albums (Billboard) | 29 |
