= Two's a Party =

Studio album by Conway Twitty and Loretta Lynn
- Released: February 2, 1981
- Recorded: October–November 1980
- Studio: Woodland (Nashville, Tennessee)
- Genre: Country
- Length: 30:06
- Label: MCA
- Producer: Ron Chancey; Conway Twitty; Loretta Lynn

Conway Twitty and Loretta Lynn chronology
Diamond Duet (1980)	Two's a Party (1981)	Making Believe (1988)

Conway Twitty chronology
Rest Your Love on Me (1980)	Two's a Party (1981)	Mr. T (1981)

Loretta Lynn chronology
Lookin' Good (1980)	Two's a Party (1981)	I Lie (1982)

Singles from Two's a Party
- 1. "Loving What Your Love Does to Me" Released: January 1981; 2. "I Still Believe in Waltzes" Released: May 1981

Two's a Party is the tenth and final collaborative studio album by Conway Twitty and Loretta Lynn. It was released on February 2, 1981, by MCA Records. This would be the duo's last album of all new material to be released. Their next and final release, Making Believe, would be a compilation of new and previously released material.

== Critical reception ==
Professional ratings
Review scores
Source	Rating
AllMusic	2.5/5 stars

Billboard published a review in the February 14, 1981 issue which said, "Some things grow better and better with time and the pairing of Conway Twitty with Loretta Lynn is one of them. The irrepressible Lynn sparks with customary vitality as she pits her husky vocals against Twitty's resonant tones on this well-balanced love medley. Chancey's production is tuned to perfection, showcasing both artists' talents in fine style." The review noted "Silent Partner", "Lovin' What Your Lovin' Does to Me", "Two's a Party", "Oh Honey, Oh Babe", and "If I Ever Had to Say Goodbye to You" as the best cuts on the album.

In the February 21, 1981 issue, Cashbox published a review saying, "Conway Twitty and Loretta Lynn have long been considered one of country music’s premiere vocal teamings. Their latest duet package proves they are not resting on past laurels, but are forging ahead; and in a few particular cases, experimenting somewhat. For instance, "Silent Partner" is somewhat of a departure from their usual sound. The tune features rock-ish overtones, accentuated by Twitty's growling vocals and Lynn's saucy replies. As usual, the album features a number of excellent love songs, including "I Still Believe in Waltzes"."

According to Stephen Thomas Erlewine of AllMusic, Two's a Party is not "one of Conway and Loretta's very best records" but there are enough strong tracks "to make it worthwhile for dedicated fans."

== Commercial performance ==
The album peaked at No. 28 on the US Billboard Hot Country LP's chart, the duo's lowest position on the chart at the time.

The album's first single, "Lovin' What Your Lovin' Does to Me", was released in January 1981 and peaked at No. 7 on the US Billboard Hot Country Singles chart, marking the duo's eleventh top 10 hit on the chart. In Canada, it peaked at No. 5 on the RPM Country Singles chart. The album's second single, "I Still Believe in Waltzes", was released in May 1981 and peaked at No. 2 in the US and No .3 in Canada, becoming the duo's twelfth and final top ten hit in both countries.

== Track listing ==
Side one
No.	Title	Writer(s)	Length
1.	"Two's a Party"	Rafe Van Hoy	2:43
2.	"The State of Our Union"	Chip Hardy, Jim Rushing	3:25
3.	"Lovin' What Your Lovin' Does to Me"	Jane Crouch, Toni Dae	2:37
4.	"I'd Rather Have What We Had"	Bobby Braddock	2:20
5.	"Oh Honey-Oh Babe"	Bob Morrison, Johnny MacRae	2:44

Side two
No.	Title	Writer(s)	Length
1.	"Right in the Palm of Your Hand"	Bob McDill	3:38
2.	"Silent Partner"	Tom Damphier	3:38
3.	"I Still Believe in Waltzes"	Morrison, MacRae, Michael Hughes	3:09
4.	"We've Been Strong Long Enough"	Paul Craft	2:43
5.	"If I Ever Had to Say Goodbye to You"	Steve Gibb	3:09

== Personnel ==
Adapted from the album liner notes.

Production:

- Bergen White – String Arrangements
- Jan Weinberg – Design
- Russ Martin – Engineer
- Hank Williams – Mastering
- Larry Dupont – Photography (back cover)
- Dennis Carney – Photography (front cover)
- Conway Twitty – Producer
- Loretta Lynn – Producer
- Ron Chancey – Producer
- Danny Hilley – Recording, Mixing

Musicians:

- Johnny Christopher – acoustic guitar
- Paul Uhrig – bass
- Clay Caire – drums
- Jerry Carrigan – drums, percussion
- Samuel Levine – flute
- Eberhard Ramm – French horn
- Shane Keister – keyboards
- Reggie Young – lead guitar
- John Hughey – steel guitar
- The Sheldon Kurland Strings – strings

Vocals:

- Conway Twitty – lead vocals
- Loretta Lynn – lead vocals
- Donna McCroy – backing vocals
- Duane West – backing vocals
- Jackie Cusic – backing vocals
- Lea Jane Berinati – backing vocals
- Tom Brannon – backing vocals
- Vicki Hampton – backing vocals
- Yvonne Hodges – backing vocals

== Charts ==
=== Album ===
Chart (1981)	Peak chart position
US Hot Country LP's (Billboard)	28

=== Singles ===
Title	Year	Peak chart position	
Title	Year	US Country	CAN Country
"Lovin' What Your Lovin' Does to Me"	1981	7	5
"I Still Believe in Waltzes"	1981	2	3
