= I Still Believe in Waltzes =

Single by Conway Twitty and Loretta Lynn

from the album Two's a Party
- B-side: "Oh Honey - Oh Babe"
- Released: May 1981
- Genre: Country
- Label: MCA
- Songwriter(s): Bob Morrison, Johnny MacRae, Michael Dennis Hughes
- Producer(s): Ron Chancey, Conway Twitty, Loretta Lynn

Conway Twitty and Loretta Lynn singles chronology
"Lovin' What Your Love Does to Me" (1981)	"I Still Believe in Waltzes" (1981)	"Making Believe" (1989)

Music video
- Listen to "I Still Believe in Waltzes " on YouTube

"I Still Believe in Waltzes" is a song recorded by American country music artist Conway Twitty on his 1980 album Rest Your Love on Me. The following year, Twitty recorded a duet version with Loretta Lynn that was released in May 1981 as the second single from their tenth duet album Two's a Party. The song peaked at number 2 on the Billboard Hot Country Singles chart. It also reached number 3 on the RPM Country Tracks chart in Canada.

== Chart performance ==
Chart (1981)	Peak position
U.S. Billboard Hot Country Singles	2
Canadian RPM Country Tracks	3
