= I Can't See Me Without You (album) =

Studio album by Conway Twitty
- Released: 1972
- Recorded: 1971
- Genre: Country
- Label: Decca Records
- Producer: Owen Bradley

Conway Twitty chronology
Conway Twitty Sings the Blues (1972)	I Can't See Me Without You (1972)	I Can't Stop Loving You / (Lost Her Love) On Our Last Date (1972)

Singles from I Can't See Me Without You
- 1. "I Can't See Me Without You" Released: November 1971

I Can't See Me Without You is the twenty-fourth studio album by American country music singer Conway Twitty. The album was released in 1972 by Decca Records.

== Track listing ==
No.	Title	Writer(s)	Length
1.	"I Can't See Me Without You"	Conway Twitty	2:40
2.	"Looking Through My Glass"	Twitty	2:35
3.	"It's Been One Heck of a Day"	Lawrence Reynolds	2:27
4.	"Kiss an Angel Good Mornin'"	Ben Peters	2:15
5.	"I Didn't Lose Her (I Threw Her Away)"	Twitty, L. E. White	2:14
6.	"I'll Never Make It Home Tonight"	White	2:08
7.	"This Road That I Walk"	Twitty	2:00
8.	"She Knows What She's Crying About"	Joe Riggs	2:55
9.	"She's All I Got"	Gary U.S. Bonds, Jerry Williams	2:36
10.	"One More Sunrise"	White	2:35
11.	"It's a Crying Shame"	Dennis Lambert, Brian Potter	2:42

== Charts ==
Chart (1972)	Peak position
US Billboard 200	130
US Top Country Albums (Billboard)	10
