= Heart & Soul (Conway Twitty album) =

Studio album by Conway Twitty
- Released: 1980
- Recorded: 1980
- Genre: Country
- Label: MCA Records
- Producer: Conway Twitty, David Barnes

Conway Twitty chronology
Cross Winds (1979)	Heart & Soul (1980)	Rest Your Love on Me (1980)

Singles from Heart & Soul
- 1. "I'd Love to Lay You Down" Released: January 14, 1980; 2. "I've Never Seen the Likes of You" Released: 1980

Heart & Soul is the forty-first studio album by American country music singer Conway Twitty. The album was released in 1980, by MCA Records.

== Track listing ==
No.	Title	Writer(s)	Length
1.	"For My Woman's Love"	Ben Peters	3:18
2.	"I'd Love to Lay You Down"	Johnny MacRae	3:19
3.	"I've Never Seen the Likes of You"	Bob McDill, Wayland Holyfield	2:50
4.	"The Feel of Bein' Gone"	Jeff Elliott, Mike Morgan	2:30
5.	"We've Got Tonite"	Bob Seger	4:09
6.	"Soulful Woman"	Kenny O'Dell	2:36
7.	"Smoke from a Distant Fire"	Ed Sanford, John Townsend, Steven Stewart	2:47
8.	"She Thinks I Still Care"	Dickey Lee, Steve Duffy	3:17
9.	"Night Fires"	Dennis Knutson, Eddie Burton	2:27
10.	"Turn On Your Love Light"	Deadric Malone, Joe Scott	4:24

== Charts ==
Chart (1980)	Peak position
US Top Country Albums (Billboard)	10
