= By Heart (Conway Twitty album) =

Studio album by Conway Twitty
- Released: 1984
- Recorded: 1984
- Genre: Country
- Length: 31:28
- Label: Warner Bros. Records
- Producers: Conway Twitty, Dee Henry, Jimmy Bowen

Conway Twitty chronology
Merry Twismas (1983)	By Heart (1984)	Conway's Latest Greatest Hits Volume 1 (1984)

Singles from By Heart
- 1. "Somebody's Needin' Somebody" Released: March 1984; 2. "I Don't Know a Thing About Love (The Moon Song)" Released: July 1984

By Heart is the forty-eighth studio album by American country music singer Conway Twitty. The album was released in 1984, by Warner Bros. Records.

== Track listing ==
No.	Title	Writer(s)	Length
1.	"I Don't Know a Thing About Love (The Moon Song)"	Harlan Howard	3:01
2.	"I've Never Had It Bad"	John Moffat	3:20
3.	"Without You"	Ron Saucer, Mike Schrimpf	3:36
4.	"All My Life"	Stewart Harris	3:29
5.	"Bad Boy"	Jamie O'Hara	3:01
6.	"Somebody's Needin' Somebody"	Len Chera	3:56
7.	"By Heart"	Hugh Prestwood	3:02
8.	"When the Magic Works"	Bill LaBounty, Don Cook	2:22
9.	"Call It What You Want To (It's Still Love)"	Keith Palmer	3:16
10.	"A Hard Act to Follow"	Gary Nicholson, David Chamberlain	2:25
Total length:			31:28

== Personnel ==
- Jimmy Capps - acoustic guitar
- Al DeLory - string arrangements
- John Hughey - steel guitar
- David Hungate - bass guitar
- Shane Keister - keyboards
- Larry Keith - background vocals
- The Nashville String Machine - strings
- Donna Rhodes - background vocals
- Perry Rhodes - background vocals
- Mike Schrimpf - “synergy” on "Without You"
- Buddy Spicher - fiddle
- James Stroud - drums, percussion
- Conway Twitty - lead vocals, background vocals
- Joni Lee Twitty - background vocals
- Reggie Young - electric guitar

== Charts ==
=== Weekly charts ===
Chart (1984)	Peak position
US Top Country Albums (Billboard)	18

=== Year-end charts ===
Chart (1984)	Position
US Top Country Albums (Billboard)	47
