= Desperado Love =

Single by Conway Twitty

from the album Fallin' for You for Years
- B-side: "I Can't See Me Without You"
- Released: June 1986
- Genre: Country
- Length: 2:25
- Label: Warner Bros.
- Songwriter(s): Michael Garvin; Sammy Johns
- Producer(s): Conway Twitty, Dee Henry, Ron Treat

Conway Twitty singles chronology
"You'll Never Know How Much I Needed You Today" (1985)	"Desperado Love" (1986)	"Fallin' for You for Years" (1986)

"Desperado Love" is a song written by Michael Garvin and Sammy Johns, and recorded by American country music artist Conway Twitty. It was released in June 1986 as the first single from his album Fallin' for You for Years. The song was Twitty's 35th and final solo number one country hit on the Billboard chart and 51st overall (he also reached number 1 five more times on Billboard in duets with Loretta Lynn during the 1970s, giving him an overall total of 40 Billboard number ones) The single went to number one for one week and spent a total of 13 weeks on the country chart.

When factoring in the other music publications "Desperado Love" was Conway's 51st number 1 hit. He would have four more number 1 singles through 1990; even though 1986's "Desperado Love" would be his last chart topper on Billboard.

Vince Gill sings the harmony vocal on this song, according to the jacket of the 1986 "Falling for You for Years" album.

== Chart performance ==
Chart (1986)	Peak position
US Hot Country Songs (Billboard)	1
Canadian RPM Country Tracks	1
