= Now and Then (Conway Twitty album) =

Studio album by Conway Twitty
- Released: 1976
- Recorded: 1976
- Genre: Country
- Label: MCA Records
- Producer: Owen Bradley

Conway Twitty chronology
This Time I've Hurt Her More Than She Loves Me (1975)	Now and Then (1976)	Play, Guitar Play (1977)

Singles from Now and Then
- 1. "After All the Good Is Gone" Released: March 1976

Now and Then is the thirty-fifth studio album by American country music singer Conway Twitty. The album was released in 1976, by MCA Records.

== Track listing ==
No.	Title	Writer(s)	Length
1.	"After All the Good Is Gone"	Conway Twitty	2:56
2.	"I Got a Good Thing Going"	Twitty	2:59
3.	"There's More Love In the Arms You're Leaving"	L. E. White	2:34
4.	"At Least One Time"	Jack Dunham, Galen Raye	2:31
5.	"I Don't Feel Like Lovin' You"	David Barnes	2:30
6.	"It's Only Make Believe"	Twitty, Jack Nance	2:18
7.	"I'll Try"	Twitty, Nance	2:10
8.	"Danny Boy"	Frederic Weatherly	2:57
9.	"Lonely Blue Boy"	Ben Weisman, Fred Wise	2:13
10.	"Mona Lisa"	Ray Evans, Jay Livingston	2:44

== Charts ==
Chart (1976)	Peak position
US Top Country Albums (Billboard)	4
