= Fallin' for You for Years =

Single by Conway Twitty

from the album Fallin' for You for Years
- B-side: "I'll Try"
- Released: October 18, 1986
- Genre: Country
- Length: 3:25 (single/radio edit); 4:39 (album edit)
- Label: Warner Bros.
- Songwriter(s): Mike Reid, Troy Seals
- Producer(s): Conway Twitty, Dee Henry, Ron Treat

Conway Twitty singles chronology
"Desperado Love" (1986)	"Fallin' for You for Years" (1986)	"Julia" (1987)

"Fallin' for You for Years" is a song written by Mike Reid and Troy Seals, and recorded by American country music artist Conway Twitty. It was released in October 1986 as the second single and title track from the album Fallin' for You for Years. The song reached #2 on the Billboard Hot Country Singles & Tracks chart.

"... Years" was Twitty's final single for Warner Bros. Records, before returning to his longtime label, MCA Records (where he had recorded between 1965 and 1981). It was there that he released the follow-up single, "Julia," and every other single release during the rest of his lifetime.

== Charts ==
=== Weekly charts ===
Chart (1986–1987)	Peak position
US Hot Country Songs (Billboard)	2
Canadian RPM Country Tracks	2

=== Year-end charts ===
Chart (1987)	Position
US Hot Country Songs (Billboard)	16
