= Borderline (Conway Twitty album) =

1987 album by Conway Twitty

Studio album by Conway Twitty
- Released: March 1987
- Recorded: 1986
- Studio: Sound Stage Studios, Nashville, TN
- Genre: Country
- Length: 34:41
- Label: MCA Records
- Producer: Conway Twitty, Dee Henry, Jimmy Bowen

Conway Twitty chronology
Fallin' for You for Years (1986)	Borderline (1987)	Still in Your Dreams (1988)

Singles from Borderline
- 1. "Julia" Released: March 7, 1987; 2. "I Want to Know You Before We Make Love" Released: July 11, 1987; 3. "That's My Job" Released: November 14, 1987

Borderline is the fifty-second studio album by American country music singer Conway Twitty. The album was released in March 1987, by MCA Records.

"I Want to Know You Before We Make Love" was originally recorded by American country music band Alabama on the 1985 album, 40-Hour Week.

== Track listing ==
No.	Title	Writer(s)	Length
1.	"Julia"	John Barlow Jarvis, Don Cook	3:44
2.	"Lonely Town"	Brent Mason, Jim McBride	3:12
3.	"I Want to Know You Before We Make Love"	Candy Parton, Becky Hobbs	3:35
4.	"Borderline"	Walt Aldridge	3:33
5.	"Not Enough Love to Go 'Round"	Rick Giles, Steve Bogard, Bobby Fischer	2:59
6.	"Snake Boots"	Troy Seals, Eddie Setser	3:05
7.	"I'm for Awhile"	Kent Robbins	3:00
8.	"Fifteen to Forty-Three"	Dan Goodman, Frank Dycus, Mark Sherrill, John Wesley Ryles	3:31
9.	"Everybody Needs a Hero"	Seals, Max D. Barnes	3:11
10.	"That's My Job"	Gary Burr	4:54
Total length:			34:41

== Personnel ==
- Richard Bennett – acoustic guitar
- Vince Gill – background vocals
- Emory Gordy Jr. – bass guitar
- David Innis – keyboards
- John Barlow Jarvis – piano
- Mike Lawler – keyboards
- Fred Newell – electric guitar
- James Stroud – drums
- Conway Twitty – lead vocals, background vocals
- Reggie Young – electric guitar

== Charts ==
Chart (1987)	Peak position
US Top Country Albums (Billboard)	25
