= I Don't Know a Thing About Love (The Moon Song) =

Single by Conway Twitty

from the album By Heart
- B-side: "Don't Cry Joni"
- Released: July 21, 1984
- Genre: Country
- Length: 2:59
- Label: Warner Bros.
- Songwriter(s): Harlan Howard
- Producer(s): Conway Twitty, Dee Henry

Conway Twitty singles chronology
"Somebody's Needin' Somebody" (1984)	"I Don't Know a Thing About Love (The Moon Song)" (1984)	"Ain't She Somethin' Else" (1984)

"I Don't Know a Thing About Love (The Moon Song)" is a song written by Harlan Howard and recorded by the American country music artist, Conway Twitty, with backing vocals by Twitty's daughter Joni Lee. It was released in July 1984, as the second single from the album By Heart. The song was Twitty's 48th number-one overall country hit. In the US, the single went to number one for one week and spent a total of 14 weeks on the country chart.

== Cover version ==
The song was covered by the American country music artist, Cody Johnson, for his 2021 album, Human: The Double Album. Willie Nelson chose it as the title track to his Harlan Howard tribute album in 2023.

== Charts ==
=== Weekly charts ===
Chart (1984)	Peak position
US Hot Country Songs (Billboard)	1
Canadian RPM Country Tracks	1

=== Year-end charts ===
Chart (1984)	Position
US Hot Country Songs (Billboard)	11
