= Somebody's Needin' Somebody =

Single by Conway Twitty

from the album By Heart
- B-side: "Linda on My Mind"
- Released: March 1984
- Genre: Country
- Length: 3:55
- Label: Warner Bros.
- Songwriter(s): Len Chera
- Producer(s): Conway Twitty, Dee Henry

Conway Twitty singles chronology
"Three Times a Lady" (1983)	"Somebody's Needin' Somebody" (1984)	"I Don't Know a Thing About Love (The Moon Song)" (1984)

"Somebody's Needin' Somebody" is a song written by Len Chera, and recorded by American country music artist Conway Twitty. It was released in March 1984 as the first single from the album By Heart. The song was Twitty's 31st number one country single. The single went to number one for one week and spent a total of 14 weeks on the country chart.

== Charts ==
=== Weekly charts ===
Chart (1984)	Peak position
US Hot Country Songs (Billboard)	1
Canadian RPM Country Tracks	3

=== Year-end charts ===
Chart (1984)	Position
US Hot Country Songs (Billboard)	18
