= Mr. T (album) =

Studio album by Conway Twitty
- Released: 1981
- Recorded: 1981
- Genre: Country
- Label: MCA Records
- Producer: Conway Twitty, Ron Chancey

Conway Twitty chronology
Rest Your Love on Me (1980)	Mr. T (1981)	Number Ones (1982)

Singles from Mr. T
- 1. "Tight Fittin' Jeans" Released: June 1981; 2. "Red Neckin' Love Makin' Night" Released: October 1981

Mr. T is the forty-third studio album by American country music singer Conway Twitty. The album was released in 1981, by MCA Records.

== Track listing ==
No.	Title	Writer(s)	Length
1.	"Cheatin' Fire"	Russ Allson, David Hall, Don Miller	3:26
2.	"I Made You a Woman"	Michael Huffman	3:16
3.	"Slow Lovemakin'"	Curly Putman, Michael Kosser	3:05
4.	"We Had It All"	Donnie Fritts, Troy Seals	3:07
5.	"Red Neckin' Love Makin' Night"	Seals, Max D. Barnes	4:40
6.	"Tight Fittin' Jeans"	Huffman	2:48
7.	"Over Thirty (Not Over the Hill)"	Bucky Jones	3:20
8.	"Hearts"	Bob McDill	3:24
9.	"I'm Already Taken"	Steve Wariner, Terry Ryan	3:08
10.	"Love Salvation"	Dennis Knutson, Jerry Barlow	3:51

== Charts ==
Chart (1981)	Peak position
US Top Country Albums (Billboard)	5
