= House on Old Lonesome Road =

Studio album by Conway Twitty
- Released: July 7, 1989
- Recorded: 1988−89
- Studio: Sound Stage Studios, Nashville, TN
- Genre: Country
- Length: 32:57
- Label: MCA
- Producer: Jimmy Bowen, Dee Henry, Conway Twitty

Conway Twitty chronology
Making Believe (1988)	House on Old Lonesome Road (1989)	Greatest Hits Volume III (1990)

House on Old Lonesome Road is the fifty-fourth studio album by American country music singer Conway Twitty. It was released in 1989 on MCA Records, and features the hit "She's Got a Single Thing in Mind", which Allmusic's Jason Ankeny called "the energizing hit which reaffirmed Twitty's standing among the era's country's giants."

"Play, Ruby, Play" was later released as a single by Clinton Gregory.

Professional ratings
Review scores
Source	Rating
Allmusic	2/5 stars

== Track listing ==
No.	Title	Writer(s)	Length
1.	"She's Got a Single Thing in Mind"	Walt Aldridge	3:42
2.	"Who's Gonna Know"	Jimmy Griffin, Richard Mainegra, Rick Yancey	2:49
3.	"Play, Ruby, Play"	Tony Brown, Troy Seals	3:29
4.	"House on Old Lonesome Road""	Dave Gibson, Bernie Nelson	3:57
5.	"Nobody Can Fill Your Shoes"	Roger Murrah, James Dean Hicks	2:43
6.	"Private Part of My Heart"	Max D. Barnes, Seals	3:30
7.	"Child with Child"	Dave Goodman, Allen Ray	2:57
8.	"Take Me Home to Mama"	Karen Staley, Gary Harrison	3:18
9.	"Pieces of You"	Barnes, Skip Ewing	3:20
10.	"Too White to Sing the Blues"	Lacy J. Dalton, Murrah	3:12

== Production ==
- Produced by Conway Twitty, Dee Henry and Jimmy Bowen
- Engineer: Ron Treat
- Second engineers: Mark J. Coddington, Tim Kish, Russ Martin
- Mixing: Chuck Ainlay
- Digital editing: Milan Bogdan
- Mastering: Glenn Meadows

== Personnel ==
- Conway Twitty: lead vocals
- Billy Joe Walker Jr.: acoustic guitar, electric guitar
- Reggie Young: electric guitar
- David Hungate: bass guitar
- Eddie Bayers: drums
- John Barlow Jarvis: keyboards
- Mike Lawler: synthesizer
- Hoot Hester: fiddle, mandolin
- Vince Gill, Conway Twitty, Joe Manuel: harmony vocals

== Chart performance ==
Chart (1989)	Peak position
U.S. Billboard Top Country Albums	39
