= Your Love Had Taken Me That High =

Single by Conway Twitty

from the album Conway
- B-side: "My Woman Knows"
- Released: November 1978
- Recorded: May 15, 1978
- Studio: Bradley's Barn, Mount Juliet, Tennessee
- Genre: Country
- Length: 2:40
- Label: MCA
- Songwriter(s): Jack Dunham; Galen Raye
- Producer(s): Owen Bradley

Conway Twitty singles chronology
"Boogie Grass Band" (1978)	"Your Love Had Taken Me That High" (1978)	"Don't Take It Away" (1979)

"Your Love Had Taken Me That High" is a song written by Jack Dunham and Galen Raye, and recorded by American country music artist Conway Twitty. It was released in November 1978 as the second single from his album, Conway. The song peaked at No. 3 on the Billboard Hot Country Singles chart. It also reached No. 1 on the RPM Country Tracks chart in Canada.

== Charts ==
=== Weekly charts ===
Chart (1978–1979)	Peak position
US Hot Country Songs (Billboard)	3
Canadian RPM Country Tracks	1

=== Year-end charts ===
Chart (1979)	Position
US Hot Country Songs (Billboard)	50
