= Red Neckin' Love Makin' Night =

1981 single by Conway Twitty

Single by Conway Twitty

from the album Mr. T
- B-side: "Hearts"
- Released: October 1981
- Recorded: 1980
- Genre: Country
- Length: 3:28 (single edit); 4:44 (album version)
- Label: MCA 51199
- Songwriters: Troy Seals and Max D. Barnes
- Producers: Ron Chancey and Conway Twitty

Conway Twitty singles chronology
"Tight Fittin' Jeans" (1981)	"Red Neckin' Love Makin' Night" (1981)	"The Clown" (1982)

"Red Neckin' Love Makin' Night" is a song written by Troy Seals and Max D. Barnes, and recorded by American country music artist Conway Twitty. It was released in October 1981 as the second single from the album Mr. T. The song was Twitty's 27th number one hit on the country chart as a solo artist. The single went to number one for one week and spent a total of 12 weeks on the country chart.

"Red Neckin' Love Makin' Night" — with its uptempo, boogie-influenced melody — marked the final single during Twitty's original tenure with MCA Records. Late in 1981, he had signed a deal with Elektra Records, where he continued his success (with songs such as "The Clown" and "Slow Hand" (a cover of the Pointer Sisters hit), even as his contract was absorbed into Warner Bros. Records. Twitty returned to MCA in late 1986, and his next single for that label, "Julia," was released early in 1987.

It was not Twitty's decision to the release the song as a single; instead, RCA selected it following the singer's departure from the label. Twitty said: "Personally, I would have held that particular single for summer. It's a great hot-weather beer-drinking song."

== Charts ==
Chart (1981–1982)	Peak position
US Hot Country Songs (Billboard)	1
Canadian RPM Country Tracks	3
