= We Did But Now You Don't =

1982 single by Conway Twitty

Single by Conway Twitty

from the album Dream Maker
- B-side: "A Good Love Died Tonight"
- Released: September 18, 1982
- Genre: Country
- Length: 4:01
- Label: Elektra
- Songwriter(s): Pat McManus, Woody Bomar, Berni Clifford
- Producer(s): Conway Twitty, Jimmy Bowen

Conway Twitty singles chronology
"Slow Hand" (1982)	"We Did But Now You Don't" (1982)	"The Rose" (1983)

"We Did But Now You Don't" is a song written by Pat McManus, Woody Bomar and Berni Clifford, and recorded by American country music artist Conway Twitty. It was released in September 1982 as the first single from the album Dream Maker. The song reached #2 on the Billboard Hot Country Singles & Tracks chart.

== Chart performance ==
Chart (1982)	Peak position
US Hot Country Songs (Billboard)	2
Canadian RPM Country Tracks	2
