= She's Got a Single Thing in Mind =

- cassette single cover art

Single by Conway Twitty

from the album House on Old Lonesome Road
- B-side: "Too White to Sing the Blues"
- Released: April 22, 1989
- Genre: Country
- Length: 3:45
- Label: MCA
- Songwriter: Walt Aldridge
- Producers: Jimmy Bowen, Conway Twitty, Dee Henry

Conway Twitty singles chronology
"I Wish I Was Still in Your Dreams" (1988)	"She's Got a Single Thing in Mind" (1989)	"House on Old Lonesome Road" (1989)

"She's Got a Single Thing in Mind" is a song written by Walt Aldridge, and recorded by American country music artist Conway Twitty. It was released in April 1989 as the first single from the album House on Old Lonesome Road. The song reached #2 on the Billboard Hot Country Singles & Tracks chart.

== Chart performance ==
Chart (1989)	Peak position
Canada Country Singles (RPM)	4
US Hot Country Songs (Billboard)	2

=== Year-end charts ===
Chart (1989)	Position
Canada Country Tracks (RPM)	32
US Country Songs (Billboard)	3
