= Linda on My Mind (album) =

Studio album by Conway Twitty
- Released: 1975
- Recorded: 1975
- Genre: Country
- Label: MCA Records
- Producer: Owen Bradley

Conway Twitty chronology
I'm Not Through Loving You Yet (1974)	Linda on My Mind (1975)	The High Priest of Country Music (1975)

Singles from Linda on My Mind
- 1. "Linda on My Mind" Released: January 1975

Linda on My Mind is the thirty-second studio album by American country music singer Conway Twitty. The album was released in 1975, by MCA Records.

== Track listing ==
No.	Title	Writer(s)	Length
1.	"Linda on My Mind"	Conway Twitty	2:39
2.	"It's Time to Pay the Fiddler"	Don Wayne, Walter Haynes	2:59
3.	"Roll in My Sweet Baby's Arms"	Lester Flatt	3:14
4.	"The Fool I've Been Today"	Ted Harris	2:59
5.	"I'll Get Over Losing You"	Twitty	2:57
6.	"I Just Can't Get Over You (Getting Over Me)"	L. E. White	3:13
7.	"I'm Getting Tired of Losing You"	Twitty	2:58
8.	"The Almighty Power (Of a Good Woman's Love)"	White	2:43
9.	"Girl from Tupelo"	Kenny Hart	2:39
10.	"Why Me"	Kris Kristofferson	3:48
11.	"Only Love Can Make Her Stay"	Twitty, Nat Stuckey	2:32

== Charts ==
=== Weekly charts ===
Chart (1975)	Peak position
US Top Country Albums (Billboard)	1

=== Year-end charts ===
Chart (1975)	Position
US Top Country Albums (Billboard)	9
