= I Can't See Me Without You =

Single by Conway Twitty

from the album I Can't See Me Without You
- B-side: "I Didn't Lose Her (I Threw Her Away)"
- Released: November 1971
- Genre: Country
- Label: Decca
- Songwriter(s): Conway Twitty
- Producer(s): Owen Bradley

Conway Twitty singles chronology
"I Wonder What She'll Think About Me Leaving" (1971)	"I Can't See Me Without You" (1971)	"(Lost Her Love) On Our Last Date" (1972)

"I Can't See Me Without You" is a song written and recorded by American country music artist Conway Twitty. It was released in November 1971 as the first single and title track from his album I Can't See Me Without You. The song peaked at number 4 on the Billboard Hot Country Singles chart. It also reached number 1 on the RPM Country Tracks chart in Canada.

== Chart performance ==
Chart (1971–1972)	Peak position
US Hot Country Songs (Billboard)	4
Canadian RPM Country Tracks	1
