= Saturday Night Special (Conway Twitty song) =

Single by Conway Twitty

from the album Still in Your Dreams
- B-side: "If You Were Mine to Lose"
- Released: June 1988
- Recorded: 1987
- Genre: Country
- Length: 3:21
- Label: MCA
- Songwriter(s): Larry Bastian, Dewayne Blackwell
- Producer(s): Jimmy Bowen, Conway Twitty, Dee Henry

Conway Twitty singles chronology
"Goodbye Time" (1988)	"Saturday Night Special" (1988)	"I Wish I Was Still in Your Dreams" (1988)

"Saturday Night Special" is a song written by Larry Bastian and Dewayne Blackwell, and recorded by American country music artist Conway Twitty. It was released in June 1988 as the second single from the album Still in Your Dreams. The song reached #9 on the Billboard Hot Country Singles & Tracks chart.

The song's title refers to the pejorative slang for an inexpensive handgun, which a young man purchases at a pawn shop.

== Content ==
The song's story tells of the man planning to kill himself after a failed relationship. The story opens with him bartering with a pawn dealer for the "Saturday night special" and one bullet. Before he is able to leave, he overhears the pawn dealer cruelly and callously deal with a young, distraught woman trying to hock her wedding ring ("Seven dollars, nothin' more!" he tells her, as the woman breaks down in tears). The previous customer turns around and stares angrily at the pawn dealer, placing his hand in his jacket pocket where he had placed the gun. The pawn dealer, knowing that a mistake in dealing at this point could cost him his life, relents and gives the woman a much larger sum – $2,000 – for the ring. In the end, the young man and newly divorced woman decide to run away to Texas to start a new life.

== Chart performance ==
Chart (1988)	Peak position
US Hot Country Songs (Billboard)	9
Canadian RPM Country Tracks	19
