= That's My Job =

Single by Conway Twitty

from the album Borderline
- B-side: "Lonelytown"
- Released: November 14, 1987
- Genre: Country
- Length: 4:54
- Label: MCA
- Songwriter(s): Gary Burr
- Producer(s): Jimmy Bowen, Conway Twitty, Dee Henry

Conway Twitty singles chronology
"I Want to Know You Before We Make Love" (1987)	"That's My Job" (1987)	"Goodbye Time" (1988)

"That's My Job" is a song written by Gary Burr, and recorded by American country music artist Conway Twitty. It was released in November 1987 as the third single from the album Borderline. The song reached #6 on the Billboard Hot Country Singles & Tracks chart.

== Charts ==
=== Weekly charts ===
Chart (1987–1988)	Peak position
US Hot Country Songs (Billboard)	6
Canadian RPM Country Tracks	4

=== Year-end charts ===
Chart (1988)	Position
US Hot Country Songs (Billboard)	91

== Certifications ==
Region	Certification	Certified units/sales
United States (RIAA)	Gold	500,000^{‡}
^{‡} Sales+streaming figures based on certification alone.
