= The High Priest of Country Music =

Studio album by Conway Twitty
- Released: 1975
- Recorded: 1975
- Genre: Country
- Label: MCA Records
- Producer: Owen Bradley

Conway Twitty chronology
Linda on My Mind (1975)	The High Priest of Country Music (1975)	This Time I've Hurt Her More Than She Loves Me (1975)

Singles from The High Priest of Country Music
- 1. "Touch the Hand" Released: May 1975; 2. "Don't Cry Joni" Released: August 1975

The High Priest of Country Music is the thirty-third studio album by American country music singer Conway Twitty. The album was released in 1975, by MCA Records.

== Track listing ==
No.	Title	Writer(s)	Length
1.	"Touch the Hand"	Conway Twitty	3:20
2.	"Short on Love Too Long"	L. E. White	2:11
3.	"Amanda"	Bob McDill	3:02
4.	"Before the Next Teardrop Falls"	Ben Peters, Vivian Keith	2:40
5.	"I Sure Hate to See Me Go"	Twitty, White	2:40
6.	"Don't Cry Joni"	Twitty	4:21
7.	"It Keeps Right On a Hurtin'"	Johnny Tillotson	2:50
8.	"I'll Live In Dreams of Loving You Again"	David Barnes	3:09
9.	"Sally Was a Good Old Girl"	Harlan Howard	2:33
10.	"I'm Goin' Crazy and She's Just Goin'"	Twitty, Joe E. Lewis	2:44

== Charts ==
Chart (1975)	Peak position
US Top Country Albums (Billboard)	3
