= I Wish I Was Still in Your Dreams =

Single by Conway Twitty

from the album Still in Your Dreams
- B-side: "If You Were Mine to Lose"
- Released: November 26, 1988
- Genre: Country
- Length: 3:24
- Label: MCA
- Songwriter(s): John Barlow Jarvis, Don Cook
- Producer(s): Jimmy Bowen, Conway Twitty, Dee Henry

Conway Twitty singles chronology
"Saturday Night Special" (1988)	"I Wish I Was Still in Your Dreams" (1988)	"She's Got a Single Thing in Mind" (1989)

"I Wish I Was Still in Your Dreams" is a song written by John Barlow Jarvis and Don Cook, and recorded by American country music artist Conway Twitty. It was released in November 1988 as the third single from the album Still in Your Dreams. The song reached #4 on the Billboard Hot Country Singles & Tracks chart.

== Chart performance ==
Chart (1988–1989)	Peak position
US Hot Country Songs (Billboard)	4

=== Year-end charts ===
Chart (1989)	Position
Canada Country Tracks (RPM)	69
US Country Songs (Billboard)	55
