= Don't Cry, Joni =

- Mexican release picture sleeve

Single by Conway Twitty with Joni Lee

from the album The High Priest of Country Music
- B-side: "Touch the Hand"
- Released: August 9, 1975
- Recorded: 1974
- Genre: country
- Label: MCA
- Songwriter: Conway Twitty
- Producer: Owen Bradley

Conway Twitty singles chronology
"Touch the Hand" (1975)	"Don't Cry, Joni" (1975)	"This Time I've Hurt Her More Than She Loves Me" (1975)

"Don't Cry, Joni" (or "Don't Cry Joni") is a song written by American country music artist Conway Twitty. He recorded it with his daughter Joni Lee and released it in August 1975 as the single from the album The High Priest of Country Music. The recording was a pop hit peaking at number 63 on the US Billboard Hot 100 chart and number 4 on the Billboard Country Singles chart.

== Story of "Don't Cry Joni" ==
"Don't Cry Joni" is Twitty's duet with his then 16-year-old daughter, Joni Lee Jenkins. According to country music writer Tom Roland, Joni Lee had wanted — after years of resistance — to become a singer, and her father decided that allowing her to duet with him on the song (which he had written years earlier) might provide some encouragement.

"Don't Cry Joni" represented the only major hit by any of Twitty's children; two other children — Kathy (a.k.a. "Jessica James/Jesseca James") and Michael (a.k.a. "Charlie Tango") — failed to achieve notable success. In addition, the song was one of just two non-Loretta Lynn duets in which Twitty had major success (the other being a guest shot on Ronnie McDowell's 1988 cover of "It's Only Make Believe.")

This "B-side" single began achieving its popularity at the end of the summer of 1975, and eventually peaked at No. 4 that October. Its peak in popularity was unusual; Roland noted that the popularity of most other two-sided hits usually happened concurrently.

== Plot ==
The song's plot is about a 15-year-old girl (Joni, sung by Joni Lee) who develops a crush on a 22-year-old neighbor of her family (Jimmy, of which part was sung by the elder Twitty). Despite Joni begging in a love letter to Jimmy to "please say you'll wait for me" so that they may someday get married, and pleading fidelity in the meantime ("Saving all my kisses just for you, signed with love forever true"), Jimmy goes over to Joni's house to explain their age differences and that he needs to find a suitable wife now. Joni is brought to tears with this realization.

Later in the song, Jimmy moves away and tries to find the woman of his dreams, but Joni's words ("Jimmy please say you'll wait for me, I'll grow up someday you'll see") are burned into his mind. Five years pass, and Jimmy realizes that Joni — although seven years his junior — may be the girl he was looking for all along. Jimmy decides to go back to his hometown, look up Joni and try to start a relationship only to realize his own heartbreak: Joni has married Jimmy's best friend, John.

== Commercial performance ==
On the week of December 20, 1975, the original version by Conway Twitty and his daughter entered the US Billboard Hot 100 It spent seven weeks on the chart, reaching its peak position of number 63 on the week of January 31, 1976.

== Composition, writing and recording ==
The song was written by Conway Twitty. The recording was produced by Owen Bradley.

== Track listing ==
7" single MCA Records MCA-40407 (1975, US), MCA-60182 (re-issue, US), MCA MI-30293 (1975)

A. "Don't Cry Joni" (4:21)

(vocal accompaniment: Joni Twitty)

B. "Touch the Hand" (3:29)

Promo 7" single MCA Records MCA-40407 (1975, US)

A. "Don't Cry Joni" (Long Version) (4:21)

(vocal accompaniment: Joni Twitty)

B. "Don't Cry Joni" (Short Version) (3:05)

== Cover versions ==
German singer Gunter Gabriel translated the song into German and released it (under the title "Tina, weine nicht") in 1980 in a duet with his daughter Yvonne.

The song was also covered by Irish country singer Daniel O'Donnell with his sister Margo.

Czech version was published in 1987 under the title Víc než přítel (More than a friend), sung by Karel Černoch with lyrics by Jaroslav Machek. An eight-year old boy approaches an adult man, asking him to be his friend, because he "misses a friend more than a father". It makes the man realize, that the boy is actually his illegitimate son. This plot is sometimes mocked.

== Charts ==
Chart (1975–1976)	Peak position
US Billboard Hot 100	63
