= Ain't She Somethin' Else =

Single by Eddy Raven

from the album This Is Eddy Raven
- B-side: "If Is a Bird on a Chain"
- Released: November 23, 1974
- Genre: Country
- Label: ABC
- Songwriters: Bill Rice, Jerry Foster
- Producer: Don Gant

Eddy Raven singles chronology
"The Last of the Sunshine Cowboys" (1974)	"Ain't She Somethin' Else" (1974)	"Good News, Bad News" (1975)

"Ain't She Somethin' Else" is a song recorded by American country music artist Eddy Raven. It was released in November 1974 as the first single from the album This Is Eddy Raven. The song reached number 46 on the Billboard Hot Country Singles & Tracks chart. The song was written by Bill Rice and Jerry Foster.

== Eddy Raven version ==
=== Chart performance ===
Chart (1974)	Peak position
US Hot Country Songs (Billboard)	46
Canadian RPM Country Tracks	34

== Conway Twitty version ==
"Ain't She Somethin' Else"

Single by Conway Twitty

from the album Latest Greatest Hits
- B-side: "The Games That Daddies Play"
- Released: November 1984
- Genre: Country
- Length: 3:24
- Label: Warner Bros. Nashville
- Songwriters: Bill Rice; Jerry Foster
- Producers: Conway Twitty, Dee Henry

Conway Twitty singles chronology
"I Don't Know a Thing About Love (The Moon Song)" (1984)	"Ain't She Somethin' Else" (1984)	"Don't Call Him a Cowboy" (1985)

The song was re-recorded in 1984 by American country music artist Conway Twitty. Twitty's version was released in November of that year as the first single from his Latest Greatest Hits compilation album. The song was Twitty's 33rd number one single on the country chart. The single went to number one for one week and spent a total of 14 weeks on the country chart.

=== Chart performance ===
Chart (1984–1985)	Peak position
US Hot Country Songs (Billboard)	1
Canadian RPM Country Tracks	1
