= I Want to Know You Before We Make Love =

Single by Conway Twitty

from the album Borderline
- B-side: "Snake Boots"
- Released: July 11, 1987
- Genre: Country
- Length: 3:36
- Label: MCA
- Songwriter(s): Becky Hobbs, Candy Parton
- Producer(s): Jimmy Bowen, Conway Twitty, Dee Henry

Conway Twitty singles chronology
"Julia" (1987)	"I Want to Know You Before We Make Love" (1987)	"That's My Job" (1987)

"I Want to Know You Before We Make Love" is a song written by Becky Hobbs and Candy Parton, and recorded by American country music band Alabama on their 1985 album, 40-Hour Week. It is better known by the cover version by the American country music artist Conway Twitty. Twitty's version was released in July 1987 as the second single from his album, Borderline. The song reached #2 on the Billboard Hot Country Singles & Tracks chart.

== Charts ==
=== Weekly charts ===
Chart (1987)	Peak position
US Hot Country Songs (Billboard)	2
Canadian RPM Country Tracks	2

=== Year-end charts ===
Chart (1987)	Position
US Hot Country Songs (Billboard)	27
