= House on Old Lonesome Road (song) =

Single by Conway Twitty

from the album House on Old Lonesome Road
- B-side: "Nobody Can Fill Your Shoes"
- Released: August 26, 1989
- Genre: Country
- Length: 3:58
- Label: MCA
- Songwriters: Dave Gibson, Bernie Nelson
- Producers: Jimmy Bowen, Conway Twitty, Dee Henry

Conway Twitty singles chronology
"She's Got a Single Thing in Mind" (1989)	"House on Old Lonesome Road" (1989)	"Who's Gonna Know" (1989)

"House on Old Lonesome Road" is a song written by Dave Gibson and Bernie Nelson, and recorded by American country music artist Conway Twitty. It was released in August 1989 as the second single and title track from the album House on Old Lonesome Road. The song reached No. 19 on the Billboard Hot Country Singles & Tracks chart.

== Chart performance ==
Chart (1989)	Peak position
Canada Country Singles (RPM)	28
US Hot Country Songs (Billboard)	19
