= Boogie Grass Band =

Single by Conway Twitty

from the album Conway
- B-side: "That's All She Wrote"
- Released: July 1978
- Recorded: June 14, 1977
- Studio: Bradley's Barn, Mount Juliet, Tennessee
- Genre: Country
- Length: 2:25
- Label: MCA
- Songwriter(s): Ronnie Reno
- Producer(s): Owen Bradley

Conway Twitty singles chronology
"The Grandest Lady of Them All" (1978)	"Boogie Grass Band" (1978)	"Your Love Had Taken Me That High" (1978)

"Boogie Grass Band" is a song written by Ronnie Reno, and recorded by American country music artist Conway Twitty. It was released in July 1978 as the first single from his album Conway. The song peaked at number 2 on the Billboard Hot Country Singles chart. It also reached number 1 on the RPM Country Tracks chart in Canada.

== Chart performance ==
Chart (1978)	Peak position
US Hot Country Songs (Billboard)	2
Canadian RPM Country Tracks	1
