= After All the Good Is Gone =

Single by Conway Twitty

from the album Now and Then
- B-side: "I Got a Good Thing Going"
- Released: March 1976
- Recorded: November 18, 1974
- Studio: Bradley's Barn, Mount Juliet, Tennessee
- Genre: Country
- Length: 2:58
- Label: MCA
- Songwriter(s): Conway Twitty
- Producer(s): Owen Bradley

Conway Twitty singles chronology
"This Time I've Hurt Her More Than She Loves Me" (1975)	"After All the Good Is Gone" (1976)	"The Games That Daddies Play" (1976)

"After All the Good Is Gone" is a song written and recorded by American country music artist Conway Twitty. It was released in March 1976 as the first single from the album Now and Then. The song was Twitty's 16th number one on the country chart. The single stayed at number one for a single week and spent a total of 11 weeks on the country chart.

== Personnel ==
- Conway Twitty — vocals
- Joe E. Lewis, The Nashville Sounds — vocals
- Harold Bradley — 6-string electric bass guitar
- Ray Edenton — acoustic guitar
- Johnny Gimble — fiddle
- John Hughey — steel guitar
- Tommy Markham — drums
- Grady Martin — electric guitar
- Bob Moore — bass
- Hargus "Pig" Robbins — piano

== Charts ==
=== Weekly charts ===
Chart (1976)	Peak position
US Hot Country Songs (Billboard)	1
Canadian RPM Country Tracks	1

=== Year-end charts ===
Chart (1976)	Position
US Hot Country Songs (Billboard)	47
