= Tight Fittin' Jeans =

Single by Conway Twitty

from the album Mr. T
- B-side: "I Made You a Woman"
- Released: June 1981
- Genre: Country
- Length: 2:50
- Label: MCA
- Songwriter: Michael Huffman
- Producers: Ron Chancey, Conway Twitty

Conway Twitty singles chronology
| "Rest Your Love on Me" (1981) | "Tight Fittin' Jeans" (1981) | "Red Neckin' Love Makin' Night" (1981) |

"Tight Fittin' Jeans" is a song written by Michael Huffman, and recorded by American country music artist Conway Twitty. It was released in June 1981 as the first single from the album Mr. T. The song was Twitty's 26th number one on the country chart. The single stayed at number one for one week and spent a total of 10 weeks on the country chart.

The original album cut of the song did not feature any electric guitar leads; they were overdubbed for the single version after the album's release.

== Charts ==
| Chart (1981) | Peak position |
|---|---|
| US Hot Country Songs (Billboard) | 1 |
| Canadian RPM Country Tracks | 8 |

== Certifications ==
| Region | Certification | Certified units/sales |
|---|---|---|
| United States (RIAA) | Platinum | 1,000,000^{‡} |
^{‡} Sales+streaming figures based on certification alone.
