= I'd Love to Lay You Down =

Single by Conway Twitty

from the album Heart & Soul
- B-side: "She Thinks I Still Care"
- Released: January 14, 1980
- Genre: Country
- Length: 3:24
- Label: MCA
- Songwriter: Johnny MacRae
- Producers: Conway Twitty, David Barnes

Conway Twitty singles chronology
"Happy Birthday Darlin'" (1979)	"I'd Love to Lay You Down" (1980)	"I've Never Seen the Likes of You" (1980)

"I'd Love to Lay You Down" is a song written by Johnny MacRae, and recorded by American country music artist Conway Twitty. It was released in January 1980 as the first single from the album Heart & Soul. The song was Twitty's 24th number one on the country chart. The single stayed at number one for one week. The song has sold 300,000 digital copies since becoming available for download.

In 2002, Daryle Singletary released a remake, which went to number 43 on the same chart.

Conway's version of this song features an extremely unusual series of key changes: the song progressively lowers in key instead of the musical standard of changing keys upwards.

Chris Young references this song in his single "I Can Take It from There".

== Chart performance ==
=== Conway Twitty ===
Chart (1980)	Peak position
US Hot Country Songs (Billboard)	1
Canadian RPM Country Tracks	1

=== Year-end charts ===
Chart (1980)	Position
US Hot Country Songs (Billboard)	24

=== Daryle Singletary ===
Chart (2002)	Peak position
US Hot Country Songs (Billboard)	43

== Certifications ==
Region	Certification	Certified units/sales
United States (RIAA)	Platinum	1,000,000^{‡}
^{‡} Sales+streaming figures based on certification alone.
