= Julia (Conway Twitty song) =

Single by Conway Twitty

from the album Borderline
- B-side: "Everybody Needs a Hero"
- Released: March 7, 1987
- Genre: Country
- Length: 3:47
- Label: MCA
- Songwriter(s): John Barlow Jarvis, Don Cook
- Producer(s): Jimmy Bowen, Conway Twitty, Dee Henry

Conway Twitty singles chronology
"Fallin' for You for Years" (1986)	"Julia" (1987)	"I Want to Know You Before We Make Love" (1987)

"Julia" is a song written by John Barlow Jarvis and Don Cook, and it was recorded by American country music artist Conway Twitty. It was released in March 1987 as the first single from his album Borderline. The song reached #2 on the Billboard Hot Country Singles & Tracks chart.

== Charts ==
=== Weekly charts ===
Chart (1987)	Peak position
US Hot Country Songs (Billboard)	2
Canadian RPM Country Tracks	3

=== Year-end charts ===
Chart (1987)	Position
US Hot Country Songs (Billboard)	32
