= Touch the Hand =

Single by Conway Twitty

from the album The High Priest of Country Music
- B-side: "Don't Cry Joni"
- Released: May 1975
- Recorded: November 19, 1974
- Studio: Bradley's Barn, Mount Juliet, Tennessee
- Genre: Country
- Length: 3:22
- Label: MCA
- Songwriter(s): Ron Peterson, Conway Twitty
- Producer(s): Owen Bradley

Conway Twitty singles chronology
"Linda on My Mind" (1975)	"Touch the Hand" (1975)	"Don't Cry Joni" (1975)

"Touch the Hand" is a song co-written and recorded by American country music singer Conway Twitty. It was released in August 1975 as the first single from the album The High Priest of Country Music. A ballad that became one of his 41 Billboard No. 1 songs (all but one of them on the Hot Country Singles chart), the song represented one half of a double-sided hit for Twitty in 1975. The other side was "Don't Cry Joni".

Initially, Twitty claimed to have written "Touch the Hand", but after Ron Peterson (twice president of the Nashville Songwriters Association) filed a copyright infringement suit against the singer in Nashville on September 23, 1975, Peterson was properly credited.

== Personnel ==
- Conway Twitty — vocals
- Harold Bradley — 6-string electric bass guitar
- Ray Edenton — acoustic guitar
- Johnny Gimble — fiddle
- John Hughey — steel guitar
- Tommy Markham — drums
- Grady Martin — electric guitar
- Bob Moore — bass
- Hargus "Pig" Robbins — piano

== Chart performance ==
Chart (1975)	Peak position
U.S. Billboard Hot Country Singles	1
Canadian RPM Country Tracks	8

== See also ==
- Allmusic — Don't Cry Joni and Touch the Hand by Conway Twitty.
