= Linda on My Mind (song) =

Single by Conway Twitty

from the album Linda on My Mind
- B-side: "She's Just Not Over You Yet"
- Released: January 1975
- Recorded: June 19, 1973
- Studio: Bradley's Barn, Mount Juliet, Tennessee
- Genre: Country
- Length: 2:41
- Label: MCA
- Songwriter(s): Conway Twitty
- Producer(s): Owen Bradley

Conway Twitty singles chronology
"I See the Want To in Your Eyes" (1974)	"Linda on My Mind" (1975)	"Touch the Hand" (1975)

"Linda on My Mind" is a song written and recorded by American country music artist Conway Twitty. It was released in January 1975 as the first single and title track from the album Linda on My Mind. The song was Twitty's 12th number one on the U.S. country singles chart. The single stayed at number one for one week and spent a total of eight weeks on the chart.

== Cover versions ==
The song was recorded that same year by Ronnie Milsap on his album Night Things.

== Personnel ==
- Conway Twitty — lead vocals
- Carol Lee Cooper, L.E. White — background vocals
- Harold Bradley — 6-string electric bass guitar
- Ray Edenton — acoustic guitar
- Johnny Gimble — fiddle
- John Hughey — steel guitar
- Tommy Markham — drums
- Grady Martin — electric guitar
- Bob Moore — bass
- Hargus "Pig" Robbins — piano

== Chart performance ==
Chart (1975)	Peak position
US Hot Country Songs (Billboard)	1
US Billboard Hot 100	61
Canadian RPM Country Tracks	1
Canadian RPM Top Singles	51
