= 20 Hits Special Collection, Vol. 1 =

Greatest hits album by Hank Williams, Jr
- Released: November 7, 1995
- Genre: Country
- Length: 58:56
- Label: Curb
- Producers: Jimmy Bowen; Mike Curb; Clayton Ivey; Ray Ruff; Jim Vienneau; Hank Williams, Jr.; Terry Woodford

Hank Williams, Jr chronology
Hog Wild (1995)	20 Hits Special Collection, Vol. 1 (1995)	A.K.A. Wham Bam Sam (1996)

20 Hits Special Collection, Vol. 1 is a greatest hits album by American country music artist Hank Williams, Jr. This album was released on November 7, 1995, via Curb Records.

== Track listing ==
No.	Title	Writer(s)	Length
1.	"Your Cheatin' Heart"		2:51
2.	"You Win Again"		3:18
3.	"All For the Love of Sunshine"		3:49
4.	"Rainin' in My Heart"	James Moore/Jerry West	2:56
5.	"Ain't That a Shame"		2:22
6.	"Mobile Boogie"		2:36
7.	"I Fought the Law"		2:26
8.	"Family Tradition"		4:03
9.	"Whiskey Bent and Hell Bound"		3:12
10.	"White Lightning"		2:22
11.	"Women I've Never Had"		2:54
12.	"The Conversation"		3:54
13.	"Old Habits"		3:05
14.	"Kaw-Liga"		4:25
15.	"The American Way"		3:07
16.	"If You Don't Like Hank Williams"		2:55
17.	"Dixie on My Mind"		2:38
18.	"Texas Women"		2:29
19.	"Ramblin' Man"		3:37
20.	"All My Rowdy Friends"		3:57
