= 1970s in music =

This article includes an overview of the major events and trends in popular music in the 1970s. In North America, Europe, and Oceania, the decade saw the rise of disco, which then went on to become one of the biggest genres of the decade, especially in the mid-to-late 1970s. In Europe, a variant known as Euro disco rose in popularity towards the end of the 1970s. Aside from disco, funk, soul, R&B, smooth jazz, and jazz fusion remained popular throughout the decade. Rock music played an important part in the Western musical scene, with punk rock thriving throughout the mid to late 1970s.

Other sub-genres of rock, particularly glam rock, hard rock, progressive rock, art rock, blues rock, and heavy metal achieved various amounts of success. Other genres such as reggae were innovative throughout the decade and grew a significant following. Hip hop emerged during this decade, but was slow to start and did not become significant until the late 1980s. Classical began losing a little momentum; however, through invention and theoretical development, this particular genre gave rise to experimental classical and minimalist music by classical composers. A sub-genre of classical, film scores, remained popular with movie-goers.

Alongside the popularity of experimental music, the decade was notable for its contributions to electronic music, which rose in popularity with the continued development of synthesizers and harmonizers; more composers embraced this particular genre, gaining the notice of listeners who were looking for something new and different. Its rising popularity, mixed with the popular music of the period, led to the creation of synthpop. Pop also had a popularity role in the 1970s.

In Africa, especially Nigeria, the genre known as Afrobeat gained a following throughout the 1970s.

In Latin America and the Iberian Peninsula, the Nueva canción movement peaked in popularity and was adopted as the music of the hippie, Liberation Theology, and New Left movements. Cumbia music began its internationalization as regional scenes rose outside Colombia. Merengue experienced mainstream exposure across Latin America and the southern US border states.

In Asia, music continued to follow varying trends. In Japan, the decade saw several musical trends, including pop music, folk music, rock music and disco music.

== Overview ==
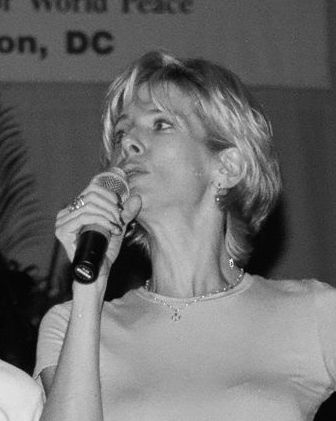
Debby Boone song "You Light Up My Life" had the most weeks at number one in the US Billboard chart

In an essay published in Christgau's Record Guide: Rock Albums of the Seventies (1981), Robert Christgau wrote:

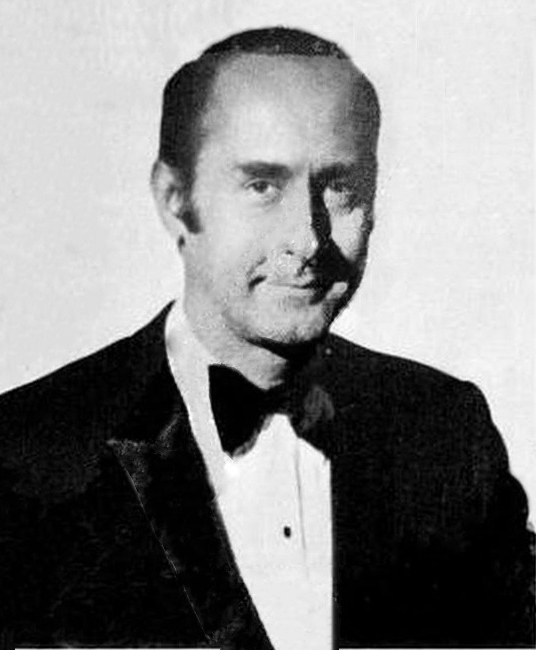
Henry Mancini

"The decade is of course an arbitrary schema itself—time doesn't just execute a neat turn toward the future every ten years. But like a lot of artificial concepts—money, say—the category does take on a reality of its own once people figure out how to put it to work. 'The '60s are over,' a slogan one only began to hear in 1972 or so, mobilized all those eager to believe that idealism had become passe, and once they were mobilized, it had. In popular music, embracing the '70s meant both an elitist withdrawal from the messy concert and counterculture scene and a profiteering pursuit of the lowest common denominator in FM radio and album rock."

According to Christgau, the decade also saw greater fragmentation along stylistic lines because of the rise of semipopular music: "It goes back to whenever arty types began to find 'the best' rock worthy of attention in the '60s, but in the '60s tolerance was the rule; it was easier to name rough substyles—say British invasion, folk-rock, psychedelic, and soul—than to analyze their separate audiences (even racial distinctions were fuzzy). Not until 1968 or 1969, when it became a hippie commonplace to dismiss soul as 'commercial' and when bubblegum and 'white blues' developed into clear categories, did the breakdown really begin. And only in the '70s did genres start asserting themselves: singer-songwriter and interpreter, art-rock and heavy metal and country-rock and boogie, fusion and funk and disco and black MOR, punk and new wave, and somehow straddling them all, the monolith of pop-rock."

== Europe ==
=== Rock ===
One of the first events of the 1970s was the break-up of The Beatles in the spring of 1970. Paul McCartney formed a new group, Wings, and continued to enjoy great mainstream success. The three other former Beatles — John Lennon, George Harrison, and Ringo Starr — all continued hugely successful recording careers throughout the decade and beyond. Lennon, McCartney, and Harrison all released extremely successful solo albums in 1970 and 1971, Imagine, McCartney, and All Things Must Pass, and several of their songs are listed among the biggest hits of the 1970s: Wings' "Silly Love Songs" and "My Love," and Harrison's "My Sweet Lord"."

==== Hard rock and early metal ====
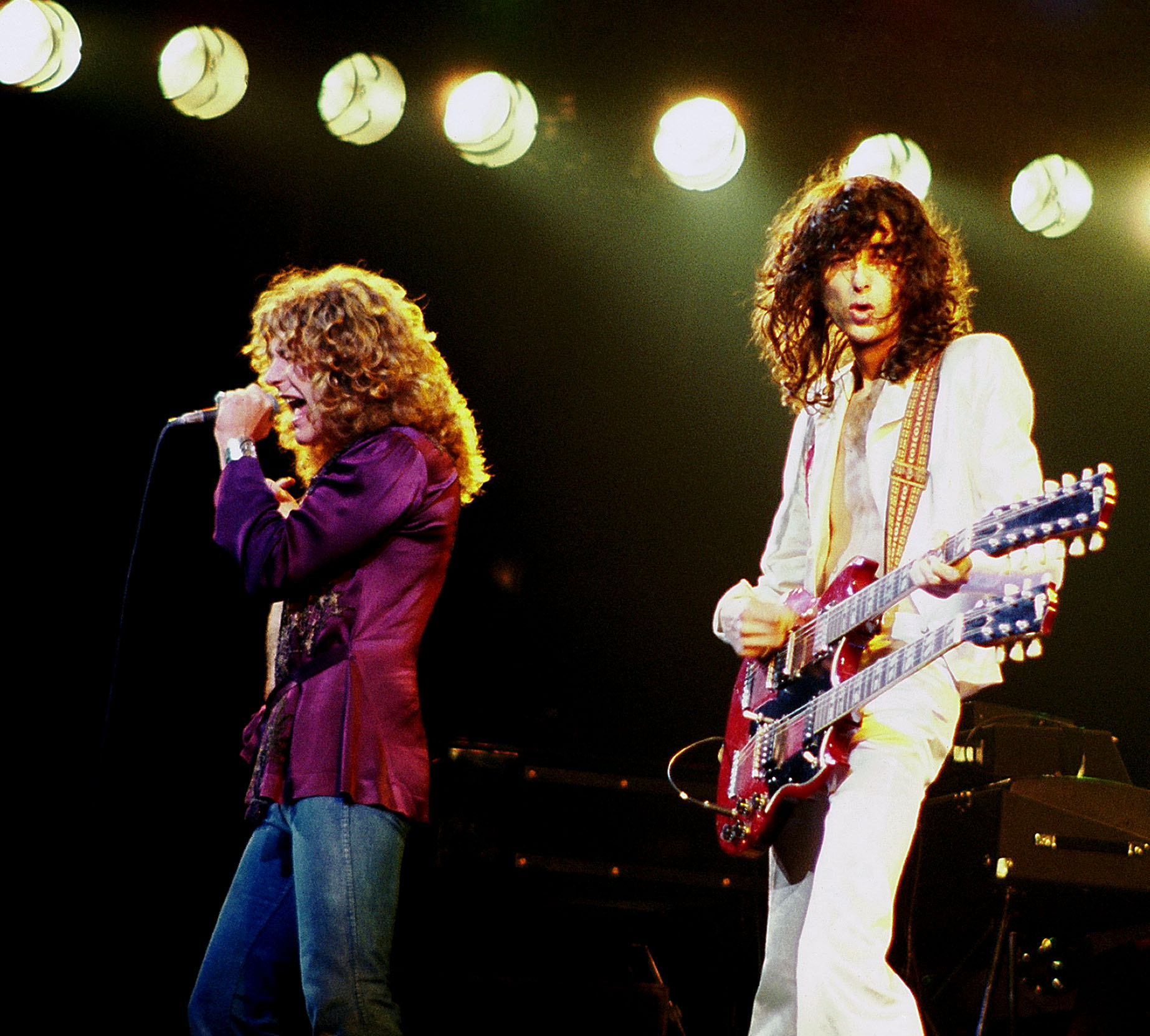
Led Zeppelin, 1977

Hard rock and heavy metal gained a cult following in the 1970s, led by Led Zeppelin, Black Sabbath, and Deep Purple, with their styles later influencing other bands like Judas Priest and Motörhead. This eventually started the new wave of British heavy metal in the 1980s.

Black Sabbath, formed in 1968 (as The Polka Tulk Blues Band, then Earth), is often credited with inventing the metal genre as well as stoner rock, doom metal, as well as sparking a revolution with much darker lyrics than were the norm in rock at that time.

==== Progressive rock ====
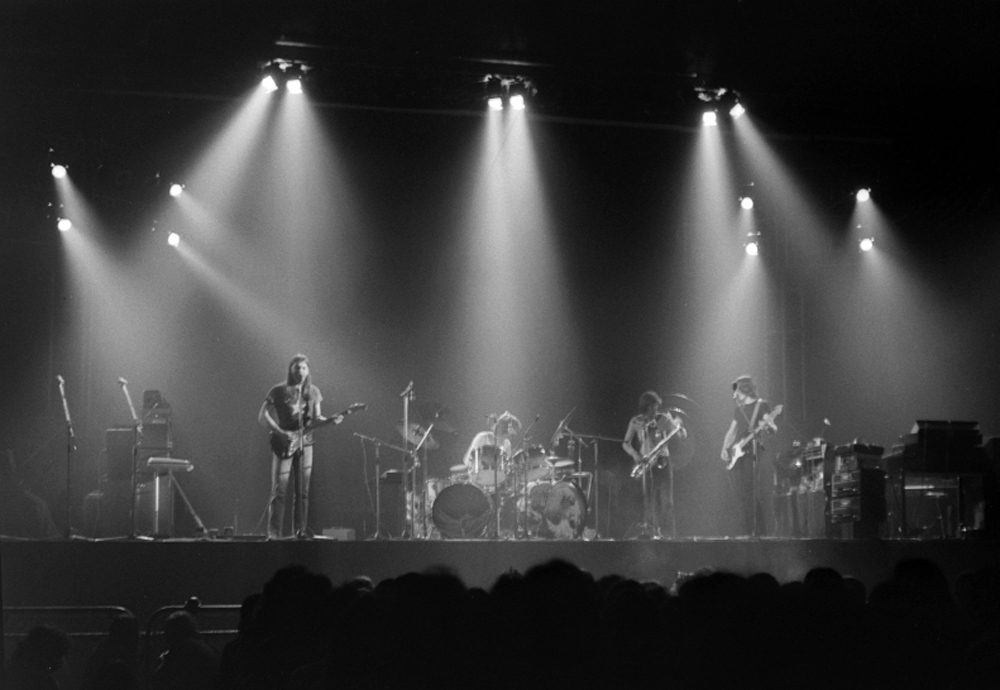
Pink Floyd, 1973

Progressive or prog rock developed out of late 1960s blues-rock and psychedelic rock. Dominated by British bands, it was part of an attempt to elevate rock music to new levels of artistic credibility. Progressive rock bands attempted to push the technical and compositional boundaries of rock by going beyond the standard verse-chorus-based song structures. The arrangements often incorporated elements drawn from classical, jazz, and world music. Instrumentals were common, while songs with lyrics were sometimes conceptual, abstract, or based in fantasy. Progressive rock bands sometimes used "concept albums that made unified statements, usually telling an epic story or tackling a grand overarching theme." King Crimson as well as The Moody Blues have been seen as the bands who established the concept of "progressive rock". The term was applied to the music of bands such as Yes, Genesis, Pink Floyd, Jethro Tull, Supertramp and Emerson, Lake & Palmer. It reached its peak of popularity in the mid-1970s, but had mixed critical acclaim and the punk movement can be seen as a reaction against its musicality and perceived pomposity. Nevertheless, Pink Floyd's 1973 release, The Dark Side of the Moon, was an immediate success, remaining in the charts for 741 weeks from 1973 to 1988, with an estimated 50 million copies sold. It is Pink Floyd's most commercially successful album and one of the best-selling albums worldwide. It has twice been remastered and re-released, and has been covered in its entirety by several other acts. It spawned two singles, "Money" and "Time". In addition to its commercial success, The Dark Side of the Moon is one of Pink Floyd's most popular albums among fans and critics, and is frequently ranked as one of the greatest rock albums of all time.

==== Glam rock ====
Glam or glitter rock developed in the UK in the post-hippie early 1970s. It was characterized by outrageous clothes, makeup, hairstyles, and platform-soled boots. The flamboyant lyrics, costumes, and visual styles of glam performers were campy, playing with categories of sexuality in a theatrical blend of nostalgic references to science fiction and old movies, all over a guitar-driven hard rock sound. Pioneers of the genre included David Bowie, Arrows, Roxy Music, Mott the Hoople, Sparks, Marc Bolan, and T.Rex. These, and many other acts straddled the divide between pop and rock music, managing to maintain a level of respectability with rock audiences, while enjoying success in the singles chart, including Queen and Elton John. Other performers aimed much more directly for the popular music market, where they were the dominant groups of their era, including Slade, Sweet, and Mud. Largely confined to the British, glam rock peaked during the mid-1970s, before it disappeared in the face of punk rock and new wave trends.

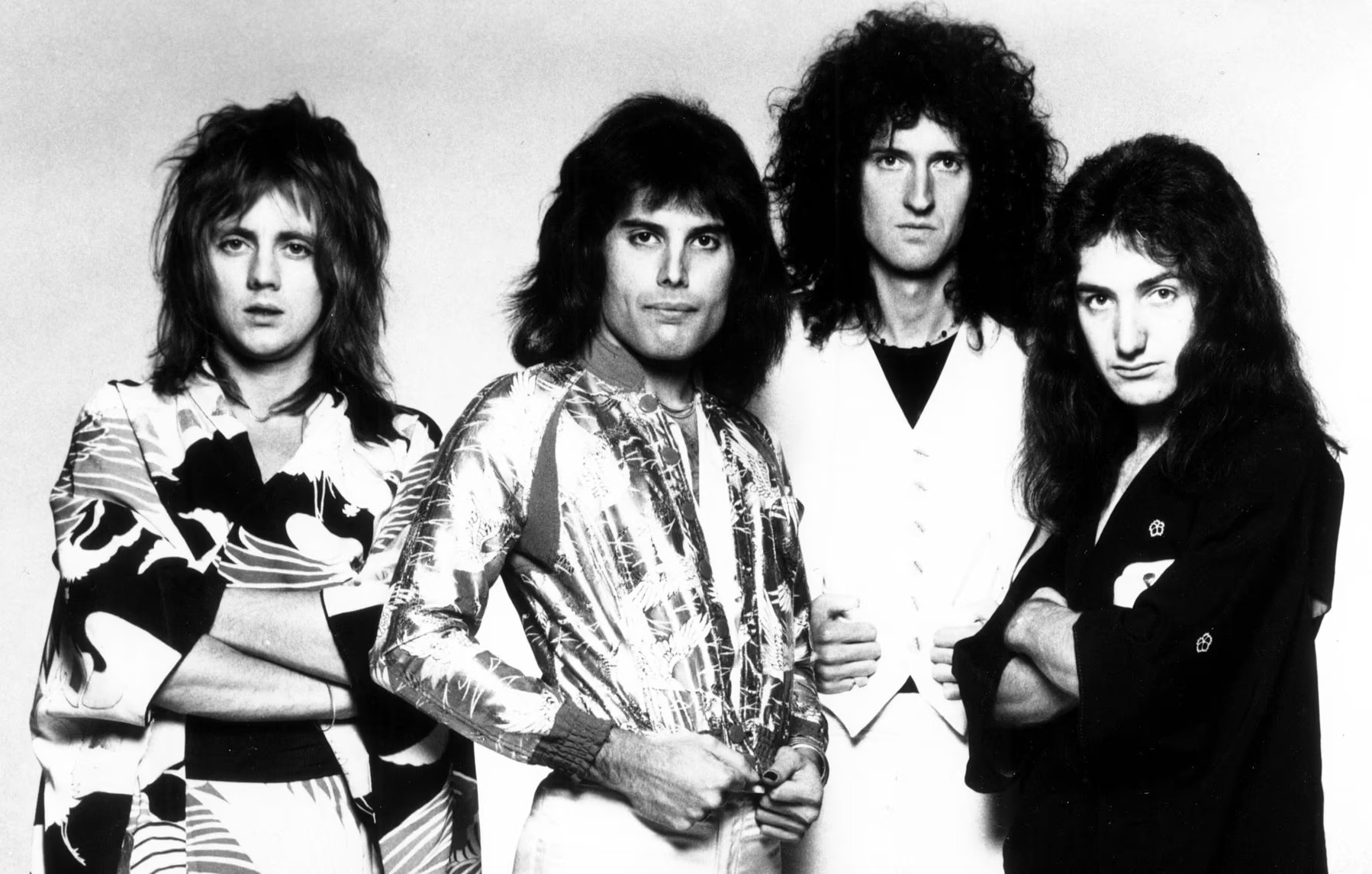
Queen, 1975

==== Soft rock ====
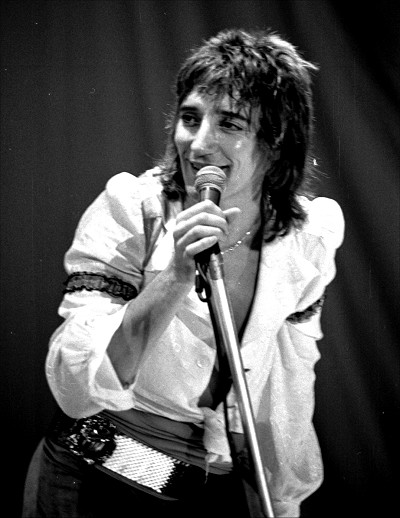
Singer Rod Stewart performing in 1976. He was one of the major British soft rock artists of the 1970s

From the late 1960s it became common to divide mainstream rock music into soft rock and hard rock. Soft rock was often derived from folk rock, using acoustic instruments and putting more emphasis on melody and harmonies. It reached its commercial peak in the mid- to late-1970s with acts like the reformed Fleetwood Mac, whose Rumours (1977) was the best-selling album of the decade. Major British soft rock artists of the 1970s included 10cc, Mungo Jerry, the Hollies, Rod Stewart, the Alan Parsons Project, and Paul McCartney and Wings. Some of the most successful singers and songwriters were Cat Stevens, Steve Winwood, Albert Hammond, Rupert Holmes, and Elton John.

==== Punk rock ====
The mid-1970s saw the rise of punk music from its protopunk-garage band roots in the 1960s and early 1970s. The Sex Pistols and The Clash were some of the earliest British acts to make it big in both the United Kingdom and the United States. Groups like the Clash were noted for the experimentation of style, especially that of having strong ska influences in their music. Punk music has also been heavily associated with a certain punk fashion and absurdist humour which exemplified a genuine suspicion of mainstream culture and values. The Sex Pistols caused a major sensation in 1977 and were the first serious challenge to the established rock groups like the Rolling Stones and Led Zeppelin, although the punk era in Britain lasted only three years and effectively ended with the Pistols' breakup.

=== Pop ===
Elton John became the decade's biggest solo pop star, releasing diverse styles of music that ranged from ballads to arena rock; some his most popular songs included "Crocodile Rock", "Goodbye Yellow Brick Road", "Bennie and the Jets", "Philadelphia Freedom", and "Don't Go Breaking My Heart" (the latter a duet with Kiki Dee). Other European soft rock major artists of the decade included Cat Stevens, Fleetwood Mac, and Joan Armatrading. (See the country music section of this article for more about country music that crossed over onto the pop charts.)

One of the biggest bands of the 1970s were the UKs Bee Gees who dominated the 1970s music scene having a string of number one hits and albums in the U.K. the U.S. and Europe they have generally been considered one of the most important acts of the 1970s, selling over 250 million albums worldwide to date.

One of the most successful European groups of the decade, and one of the best-selling acts with 380 million records sold, was the quartet ABBA. The most successful Swedish group of all time, ABBA first found fame when they won the 1974 Eurovision Song Contest. They became one of the most widely known European groups ever, as well as Queen promo 1970s.

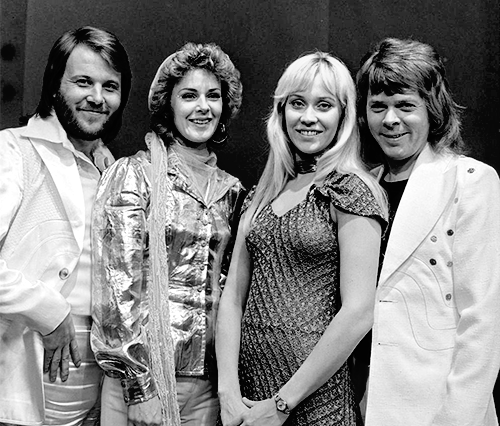
The Swedish band ABBA was one of the most commercially successful European bands of the 1970s

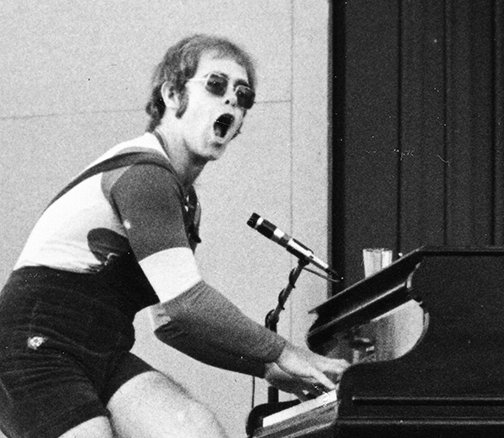
Elton John was one of the most commercially successful solo pop acts of the 1970s

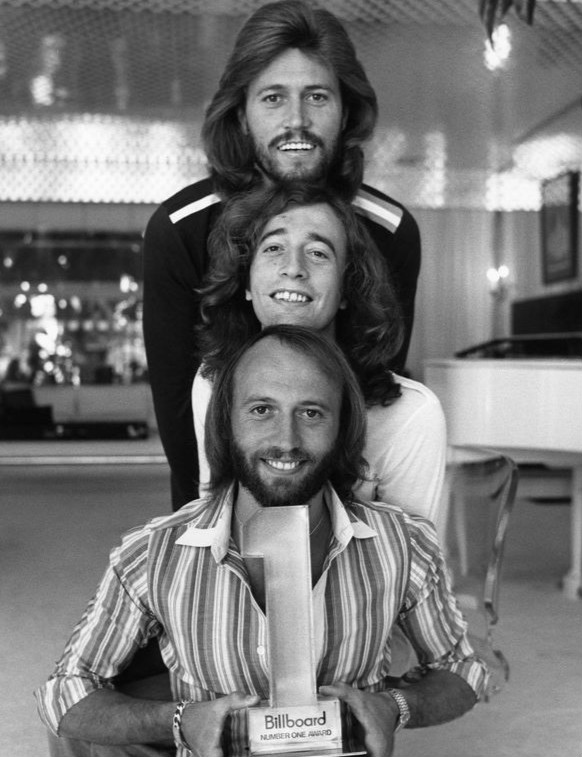
The British band The Bee Gees were one of the biggest musical acts of the 1970s leading the disco phenomenon

==== New wave ====
In the late 1970s, many bands in the United Kingdom began experimenting with synthesizers, forming the new wave style known as synthpop. Major synthpop bands around this time included Gary Numan and Tubeway Army, the Buggles, the Human League, and Orchestral Manoeuvres in the Dark. Other successful British new wave bands in the late 1970s included the Police, Echo & the Bunnymen, Adam and the Ants, Roxy Music, Squeeze, XTC, the Cure, the Stranglers, Joy Division, and Siouxsie and the Banshees.

== North America ==
=== Disco, R&B, funk, and soul ===
The Bee Gees were one of, if not the 1970s biggest musical act dominating album sales, singles sales and music charts of many countries including the U.S. and UK. They were leaders in the disco and pop music scenes of the 1970s; at one point, according to Barry Gibb, they had five songs in the top 10 of the U.S. Billboard charts at the same time, three of those being in the top 5. They were the main writers and performers of the soundtrack to Saturday Night Fever which with over 50 million copies worldwide became the second biggest-selling soundtrack of all time, and was the biggest-selling album of all time until Michael Jackson's Thriller surpassed it. Some critics have labeled the Bee Gees as the decade-defining act of the 1970s.

Along with disco, funk was one of the most popular genres of music in the 1970s. Primarily an African-American genre, it was characterized by the heavy use of bass and "wah-wah" pedals. Rhythm was emphasized over melody. Artists such as James Brown, Wilson Pickett, the Meters, Parliament-Funkadelic and Sly and the Family Stone pioneered the genre. It then spawned artists such as Stevie Wonder, Rufus, the Brothers Johnson, Kool & the Gang, Chic, Earth, Wind & Fire, the Spinners, King Floyd, Tower of Power, Ohio Players, the Commodores, War, Confunkshun, Gap Band, Slave, Cameo, the Bar-Kays, Zapp, and many more. Other popular artists in the mainstream were Bill Withers, Gladys Knight & the Pips, Three Dog Night, the Stylistics, the Fifth Dimension, Marvin Gaye, the Temptations, the O'Jays, Barry White and Issac Hayes.

The 1970s saw African-American audiences shift away from genres like rock and blues which had originally been invented and dominated by black musicians. While blues performers like B.B. King and Albert King remained successful, they changed to a mostly white audience. Soul, R&B, and funk became the predominant music styles among black artists and audiences.

Roberta Flack had two of the biggest hits of the decade with "The First Time Ever I Saw Your Face", from the Clint Eastwood film Play Misty for Me; and "Killing Me Softly". Both were #1 hits on the pop charts and she became the first and the only female artist to win back to back Grammy Awards for Record of the Year. Stevie Wonder who topped the charts five times during the decade with songs such as "You Are the Sunshine of My Life" and "Sir Duke" had a unique treble. He won Grammy Awards for both Best Male Pop and Best Male R&B Vocal Performance in 1974, 1975 and 1977.

The Jackson 5 became one of the biggest soul-music phenomena of the 1970s, playing from a repertoire of rhythm and blues, Soul and later disco. The Jacksons — brothers Jackie, Tito, Jermaine, Marlon and Michael — were the first act in recording history to have their first four major label singles, "I Want You Back", "ABC", "The Love You Save" and "I'll Be There" reach the top of the Billboard Hot 100. The band served as the launching pad for the solo careers of their lead singers Jermaine and Michael, who both had some solo success in the early part of the decade; Jermaine with the top 10 hit "Daddy's Home" and Michael who topped the charts with "Ben". Other family acts included Gladys Knight & the Pips who topped the charts with "Midnight Train to Georgia", and Sly & the Family Stone who brought "Thank You (Falettinme Be Mice Elf Agin)" and "Family Affair" to the top spot. Other groups who had hits include the Staple Singers with "I'll Take You There" and "Let's Do It Again", the theme song to a 1975 Sidney Poitier/Bill Cosby film, the Sylvers with "Boogie Fever" and the Emotions with "Best of My Love".

Honey Cone had a chart-topping hit with "Want Ads", as did Labelle with "Lady Marmalade" and A Taste of Honey with "Boogie Oogie Oogie". Other successful girl groups were Love Unlimited and the Three Degrees who scored a U.S. No. 2 and UK No. 1 hit with "When Will I See You Again" as well as the U.S. No. 1 "TSOP (The Sound of Philadelphia)" with Mother Father Sister Brother (MFSB).

The Commodores were another group that played from a diverse repertoire, including R&B, funk, and pop. Lionel Richie, who went on to even greater success as a solo artist in the 1980s, fronted the group's biggest 1970s hits, including "Easy", "Three Times a Lady", and "Still".

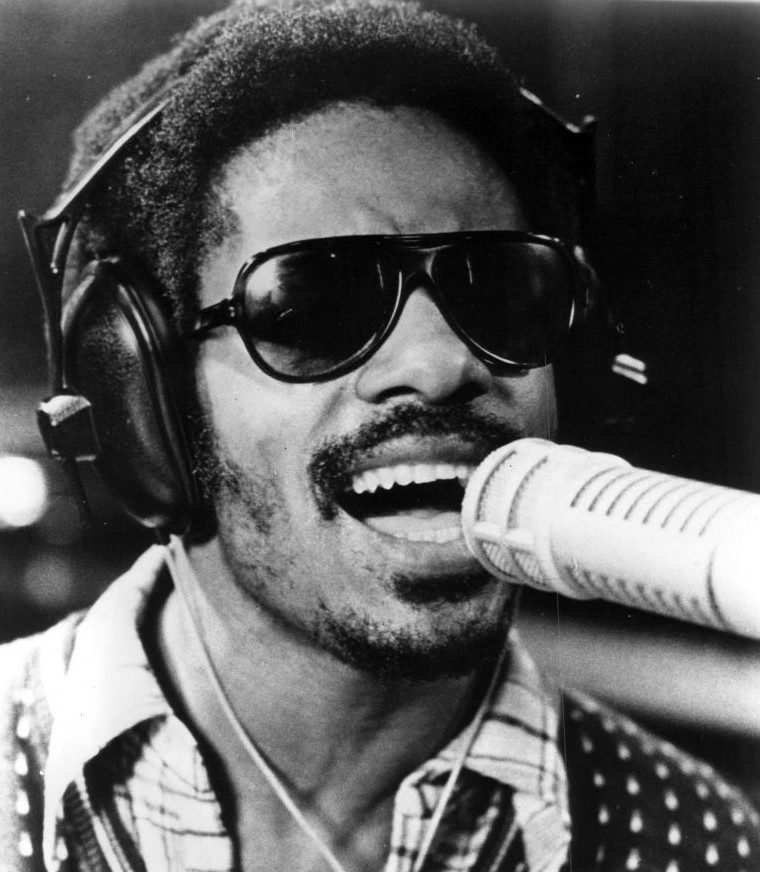
Stevie Wonder became one of the most popular R&B artists during the 1970s

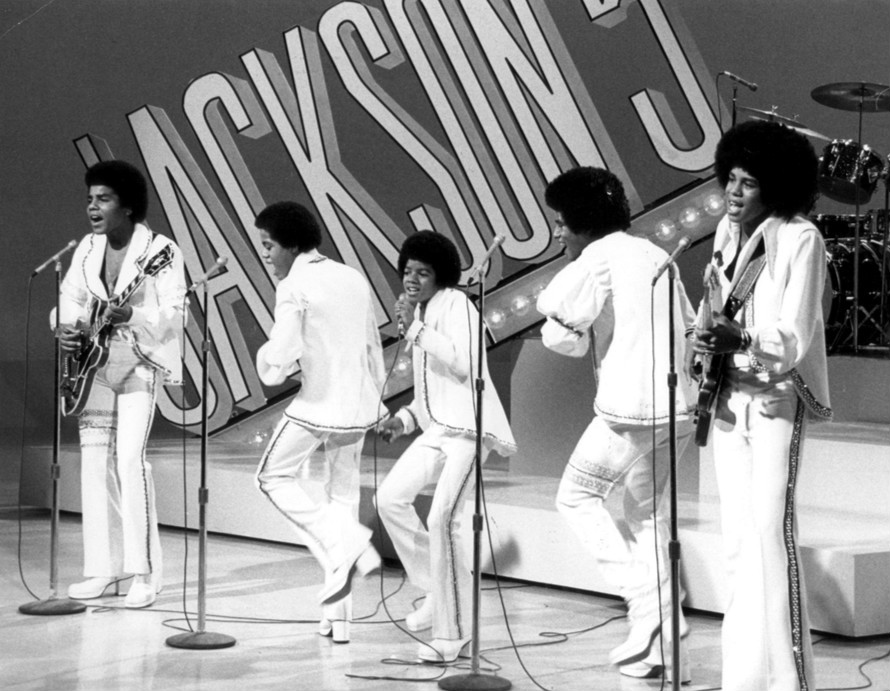
Jackson 5, 1972

One of the first disco singer to cross the mainstream was Monti Rock III, with his band, Disco Tex & His Sex-O-Lettes, making "Get Dancin'" and "I Wanna Dance Wit Choo (Doo Dat Dance)".

=== Soft rock and pop ===
Some of the more notable pop/soft rock groups during the 1970s were the Carpenters, the Jackson 5, Seals & Crofts, the Bee Gees, the Doobie Brothers, Hall & Oates, Bread, Captain & Tennille, Tony Orlando and Dawn, Bay City Rollers, and the Osmonds.

Male soloists who characterized the pop music of the era included Barry Manilow, Andy Gibb, Elvis Presley, Neil Diamond, Paul McCartney, Stevie Wonder, Elton John, Marvin Gaye, Cat Stevens, James Taylor, Eric Clapton, Barry White, Dan Hill and Rod Stewart. Female soloists who epitomized the 1970s included Linda Ronstadt, Carly Simon, Roberta Flack, Donna Summer, Barbra Streisand, Rita Coolidge, Olivia Newton-John, and Helen Reddy.

Some of the most popular music acts of the day got their own network television variety shows, which were very popular in the '70s. Acts like Sonny & Cher, Glen Campbell, John Denver, Tony Orlando and Dawn, husband and wife team Captain & Tennille, brother and sister Donny & Marie Osmond.

Soft rock was prominently featured on many top 40 and contemporary hit radio stations throughout the 1970s. Soft rock often used acoustic instruments and placed emphasis on melody and harmonies. Major soft rock artists of the 1970s included Carole King, James Taylor, Billy Joel, Chicago, America, the Eagles, The Kelly Family and Fleetwood Mac, whose Rumours (1977) was the best-selling album of the decade. (See the country music section of this article for more about country music that crossed over onto the pop charts.) Bob Dylan's 1975–1976 Rolling Thunder Revue reunited him with a number of folk-rock acts from his early days of performing, most notably Joan Baez, who returned to the charts in 1975 with "Diamonds & Rust". Dylan also released some of his most acclaimed albums during the 1970s including Blood On The Tracks and Desire.

Some of the most successful singers and songwriters were: Jackson Browne, James Taylor, Jim Croce, John Denver, Neil Diamond, Barry Gibb, Stevie Wonder, Neil Young, Carole King, Elton John, Don McLean, Joni Mitchell, Paul Simon, Kris Kristofferson, Carly Simon, Donna Summer, Gordon Lightfoot, and Harry Chapin— some had previously been primarily songwriters but began releasing albums and songs of their own. King's album Tapestry became one of the top-selling albums of the decade, and the song "It's Too Late" became one of the 1970s biggest songs. McLean's 1971 song "American Pie", inspired by the death of Buddy Holly, became one of popular music's most-recognized songs of the 20th century, thanks to its abstract and vivid storytelling, which center around "The Day the Music Died" and popular music of the rock era.

The early 1970s marked the departure of Diana Ross from the Supremes and the break-up of Simon & Garfunkel and the Beatles. All continued hugely successful recording careers throughout the decade. Some of their songs that are among the hits of the early 1970s: Simon & Garfunkel's "Bridge Over Troubled Water", Simon's solo hit "50 Ways to Leave Your Lover", Paul McCartney's "Uncle Albert/Admiral Halsey", George Harrison's "My Sweet Lord", and Ross' "Ain't No Mountain High Enough".

Popular British acts were the Rolling Stones, Peter Frampton, Gilbert O'Sullivan, Leo Sayer, the Bee Gees, Queen, Led Zeppelin, Supertramp, and the Who; whose lead singer Roger Daltrey made a splash in the 1975 film Tommy, playing the title role, based on the group's 1969 album of the same name. Elton John, Tina Turner, Ann-Margret, Oliver Reed, Jack Nicholson, and the other band members made up the ensemble cast.

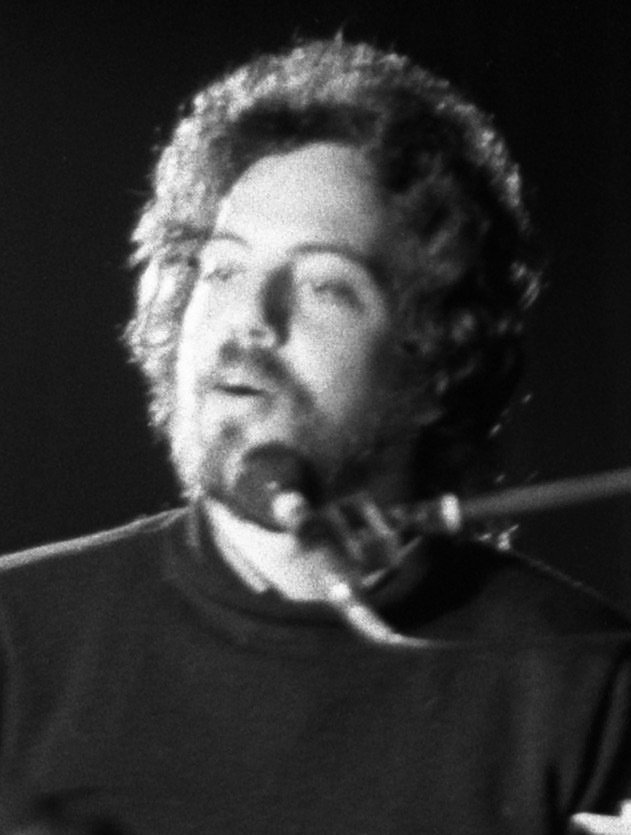
Billy Joel, 1972

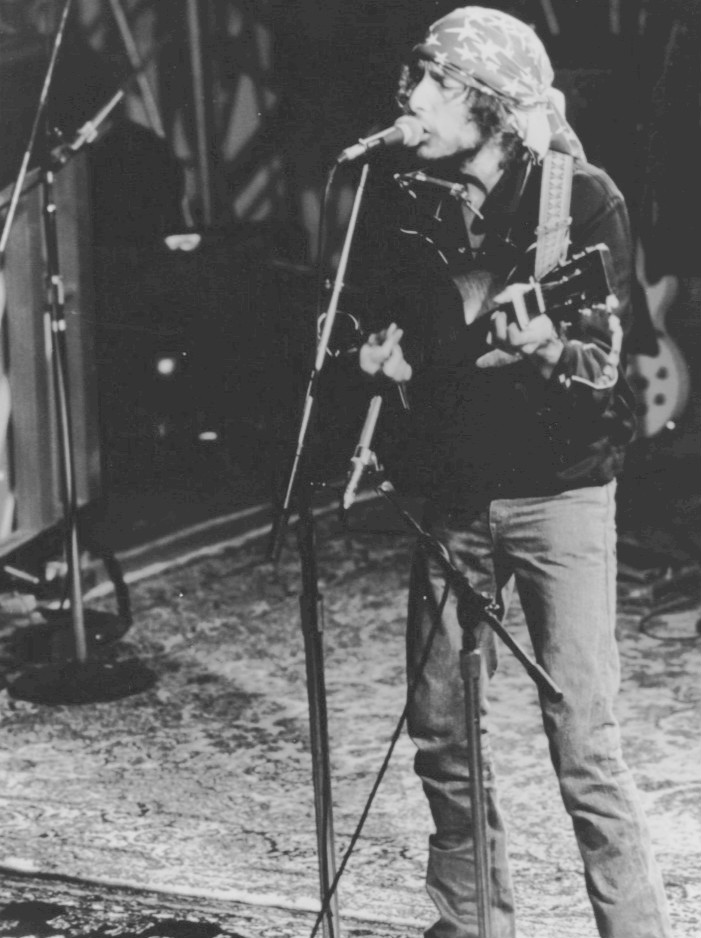
Bob Dylan, 1976

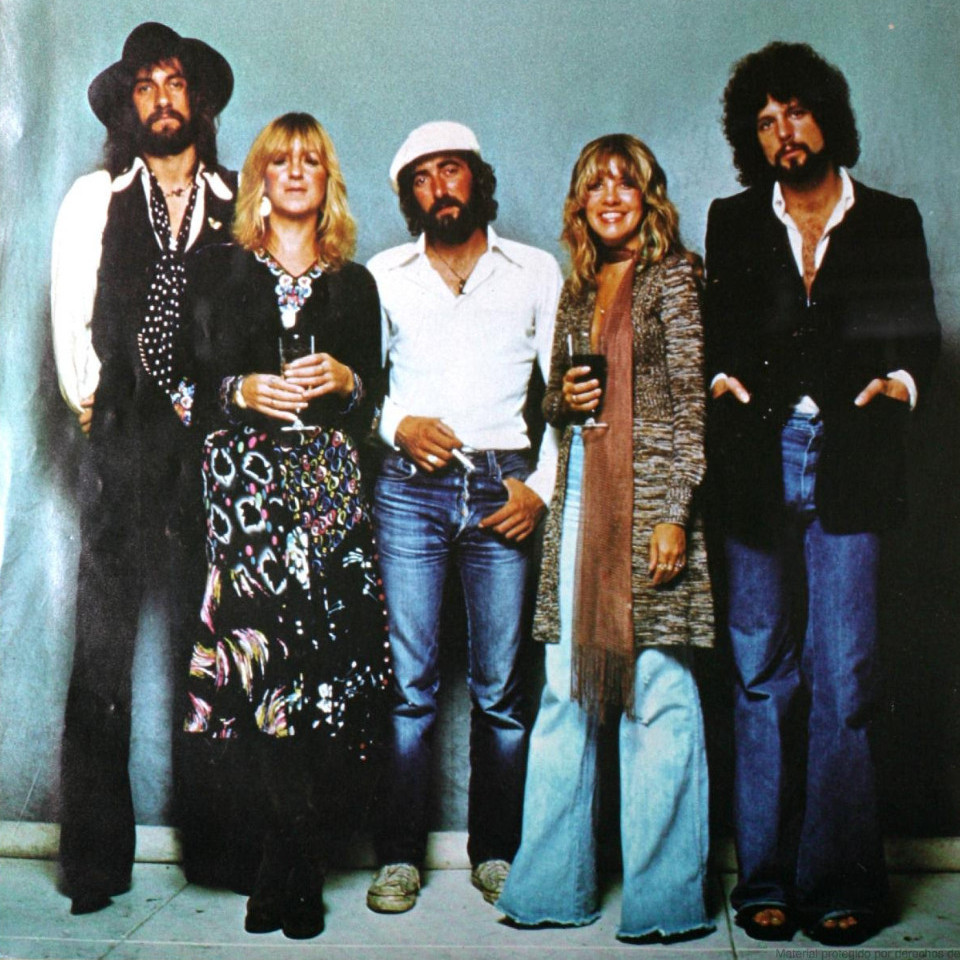
Fleetwood Mac, 1977

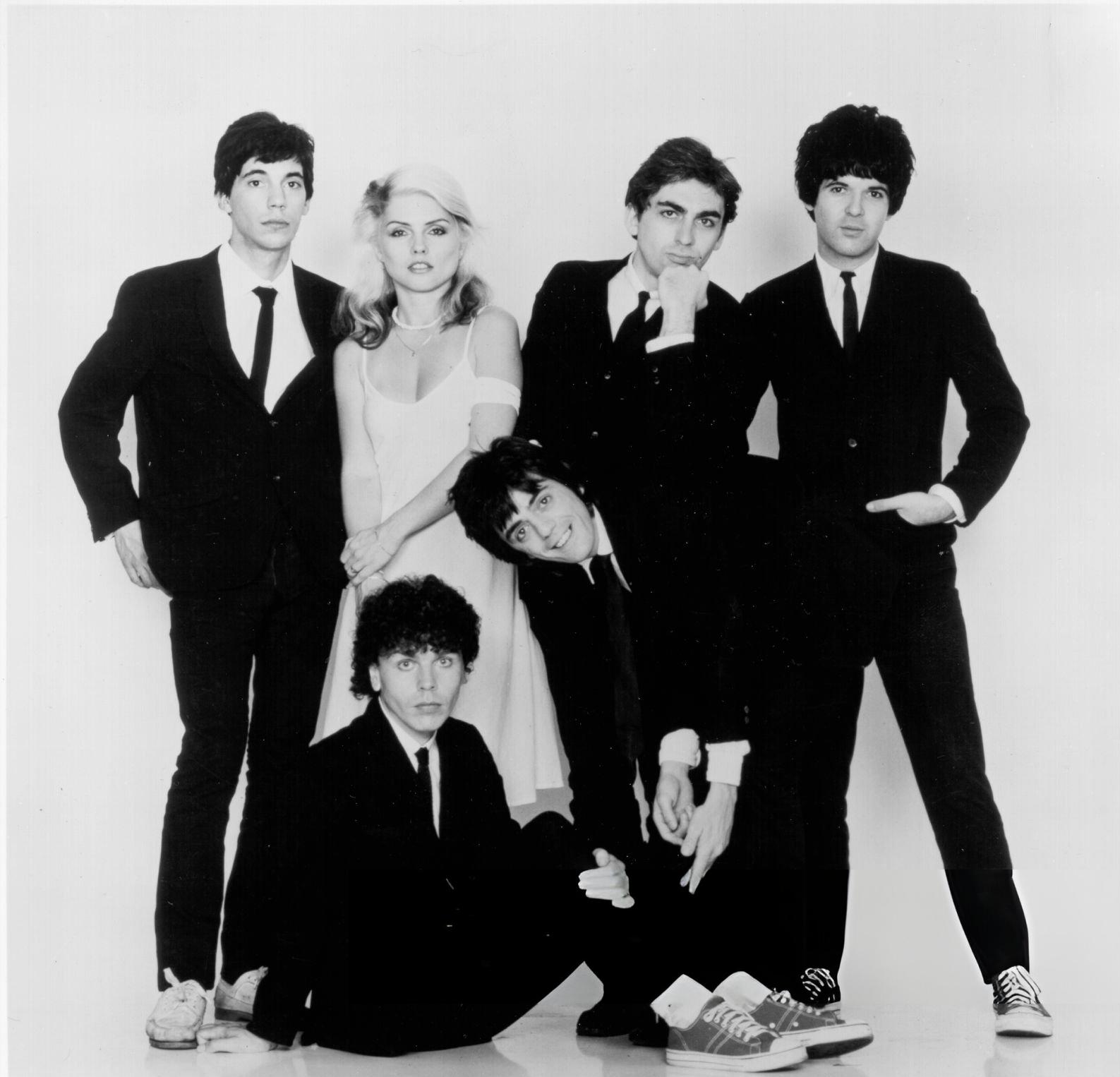
Blondie, 1978

=== Punk rock ===
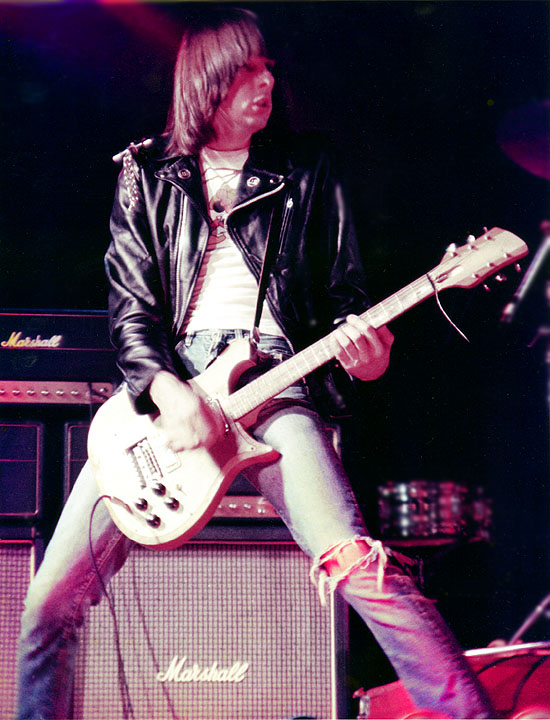
Ramones's lead guitarist Johnny Ramone performing in Toronto, 1977

The mid-1970s saw the rise of punk music from its protopunk-garage band roots in the 1960s and early 1970s. The Ramones, Patti Smith, and Blondie were some of the earliest American punk rock acts to make it big in both the United Kingdom and the United States. Punk music has also been heavily associated with a certain punk fashion and absurdist humour which exemplified a genuine suspicion of mainstream culture and values. Blondie quickly lost their punk roots, going on to become a pop/ska/reggae band.

=== Hard rock, arena rock and heavy metal ===
The 1970s saw the emergence of hard rock as one of the most prominent subgenres of rock music. During the first half of the decade, British acts such as Deep Purple, Led Zeppelin, Uriah Heep and Black Sabbath were at the height of their international fame, particularly in the United States. By the second half of the decade, many other acts had also achieved stardom, namely, Mountain, Grand Funk Railroad, Alice Cooper, Cactus, James Gang, AC/DC, Blue Öyster Cult, Kiss, Aerosmith, Van Halen, and Ted Nugent.

Arena rock grew in popularity through rock acts such as Boston, Kansas, Styx, Journey, Toto, Foreigner, and Heart, and the Carpenters.

Psychedelic rock declined in popularity after the deaths of Jimi Hendrix, Janis Joplin and Jim Morrison of the Doors, the self-imposed seclusion of Syd Barrett from Pink Floyd, and the break-up of the Beatles in 1970.

=== Progressive rock ===
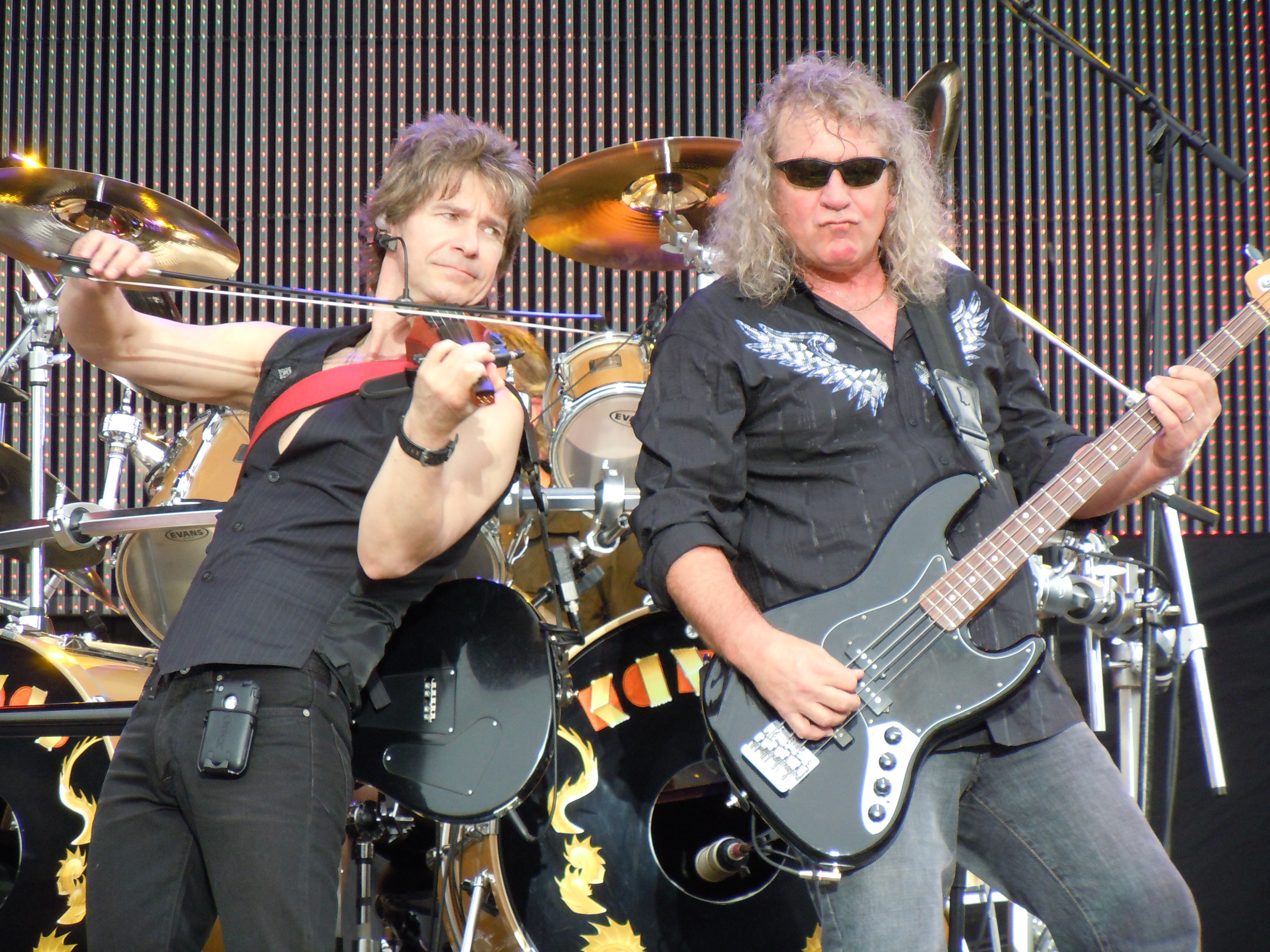
Kansas

The American brand of prog rock varied from the eclectic and innovative Frank Zappa, Captain Beefheart, Blood, Sweat and Tears, and Rush, to more pop rock oriented bands like Boston, Foreigner, Journey, Kansas, and Styx. These, beside British bands Supertramp and Electric Light Orchestra, all demonstrated a prog rock influence and while ranking among the most commercially successful acts of the 1970s, ushering in the era of pomp or arena rock, which would last until the costs of complex shows (often with theatrical staging and special effects), would be replaced by more economical rock festivals as major live venues in the 1990s.

=== New wave ===
Successful American new wave bands in the late seventies included Talking Heads, the Cars, the Knack, the B-52's, and Devo. Some of the Canadian new wave groups included Rough Trade, the Payolas, and Martha and the Muffins. After the success of British synthpop acts in the U.S. such as Gary Numan and the Buggles, a number of American bands also began experimenting with synthesizers. In the early 1980s, bands from the United Kingdom became immensely popular in the U.S., and this phenomenon became known as the Second British Invasion which mainly consisted of British new wave and synthpop acts, therefore broadening the definition of "new wave".

=== Blues rock ===
Blues rock remains popular, with Eric Clapton, ZZ Top, and George Thorogood seeing the greatest success. Freddie King started moving from straight blues to blues rock since the genre was now mostly popular among white audiences. Stress from nonstop touring resulted in his death at the age of 42 in 1976.

=== Country ===
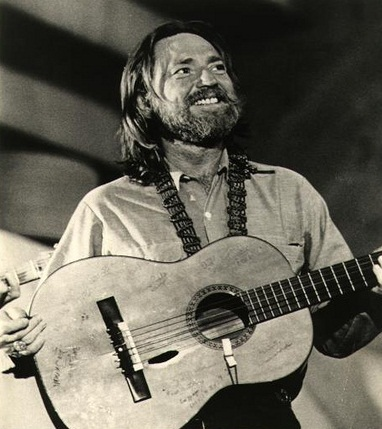
Willie Nelson became one of the most popular country music artists during the 1970s.

A number of styles defined country music during the 1970s decade. At the beginning of the decade, the countrypolitan — an offshoot of the earlier "Nashville Sound" of the late 1950s and early 1960s — and the honky-tonk fused Bakersfield Sound were some of the more popular styles.

The countrypolitan sound — a polished, streamlined sound featuring string sections, background vocals and crooning lead vocalists — was popularized by artists including Lynn Anderson, Glen Campbell, Anne Murray, Dottie West, Tammy Wynette, and others, achieving their successes through such songs as "(I Never Promised You a) Rose Garden", "Snowbird", and others. The Bakersfield sound, first popularized in the early 1960s, continued its peak in popularity through artists such as Buck Owens and Merle Haggard.

But other styles began to emerge during the 1970s. One of the more successful styles was "outlaw country", a type of music blending the traditional and honky tonk sounds of country music with rock and blues music, and mixed with the anger of an alienated subculture of the nation during the period. The leaders of the movement were Waylon Jennings and Willie Nelson, although others associated with the movement were Jerry Jeff Walker, David Allan Coe, Jessi Colter, Tompall Glaser, Gary Stewart, and Billy Joe Shaver. The efforts of Jennings, Nelson, Colter, and Glaser were encapsulated in the 1976 album Wanted! The Outlaws.

The 1970s saw the rise of country music groups. The most successful act by far during the first half of the decade was The Statler Brothers, a Stanton, Virginia-based group that had gotten its start performing with Johnny Cash in the 1960s. The group – several years removed from their 1965 hit "Flowers on the Wall" – successfully used their vocal harmonies on songs including "Bed Of Rose's," "Do You Remember These," "The Class of '57," "I'll Go To My Grave Loving You," and "Do You Know You Are My Sunshine." Until 1977, the Statlers – who in the 1970s had brothers Harold and Don Reid, Phil Balsley, and Lew DeWitt – were the only group to achieve sustained success; that year, the Oak Ridge Boys, a country gospel group, switched to a country-pop direction, and their first single release, "Y'all Come Back Saloon," was a top-5 hit on the country chart; their lineup in the late 1970s was Duane Allen, Joe Bonsall, William Lee Golden, and Richard Sterban. Both groups remained firmly committed to gospel music, but it was with country-pop that they had their most success and the rise in country groups began to take shape. In 1979, a third group – the Fort Payne-based band Alabama, the core being cousins Randy Owen, Teddy Gentry, and Jeff Cook, along with drummer Mark Herndon – emerged, releasing the mellow love ballad "I Wanna Come Over"; although only reaching the mid-30s on the country chart, "... Over" was a foreshadowing of what was to come for one of the most successful country music groups/bands of all time, with their blend of soft rock and Southern rock (which would be featured on their next single, "My Home's In Alabama," recorded in 1979 and released in January 1980).

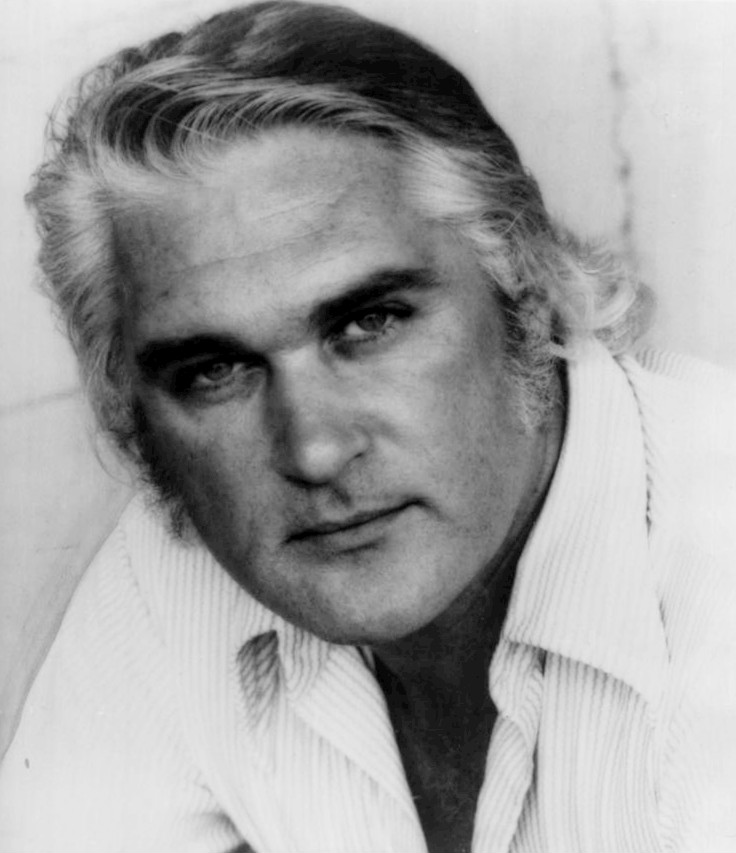
Charlie Rich

The country pop sound was a successor to the countrypolitan sound of the early 1970s. In addition to artists such as Murray and Campbell, several artists who were not initially marketed as country were enjoying crossover success with country audiences through radio airplay and sales. The most successful of these artists included The Bellamy Brothers, Charlie Rich, John Denver, Olivia Newton-John, Marie Osmond, B. J. Thomas, and Kenny Rogers. Newton-John, an Australian pop singer, was named Female Vocalist of the Year by the Country Music Association in 1974, sparking a debate that continues to this day — what is country music? A group of traditional-minded artists, troubled by this trend, formed the short-lived Association of Country Entertainers, in an attempt to bring back traditional honky-tonk sounds to the forefront, setting the stage for the neotraditional country revival that would become particularly prominent in the early 1980s. The debate continued into 1975, a year where six songs reached No. 1 on both the Billboard Hot Country Singles and Billboard Hot 100 charts. Things came to a head when, at that year's CMA Awards, Rich — the reigning Entertainer of the Year, and himself a crossover artist — presented the award to his successor, "my good friend, Mr. John Denver." His statement, taken as sarcasm, and his setting fire to the envelope (containing Denver's name) with a cigarette lighter were taken as a protest against the increasing pop style in country music (this despite Rich himself having made his name with songs that crossed over from country into the pop and adult contemporary charts).

By the later half of the 1970s, Dolly Parton, a highly successful traditional-minded country artist since the late 1960s, mounted a high-profile campaign to crossover to pop music, culminating in her 1977 hit "Here You Come Again", which peaked at No. 1 country and No. 3 pop. Of her 25 career No. 1 hits, 11 of them came during the 1970s. Parton, also became the female country music artist to host her own variety show, Dolly!, which aired during the 1976–77 season. Rogers, the former lead singer of The First Edition, followed up a successful career in pop, rock, and folk music by switching to country music. Like Parton, whom he would record with in the 1980s and thereafter, Rogers enjoyed a long series of successful songs that charted on both the Hot Country Singles and Billboard Hot 100 charts; the first of the lot was "Lucille," a No. 1 country and No. 5 pop hit. Crystal Gayle, Ronnie Milsap, Eddie Rabbitt, and Linda Ronstadt were some of the other artists who also found success on both the country and pop charts with their records as well.

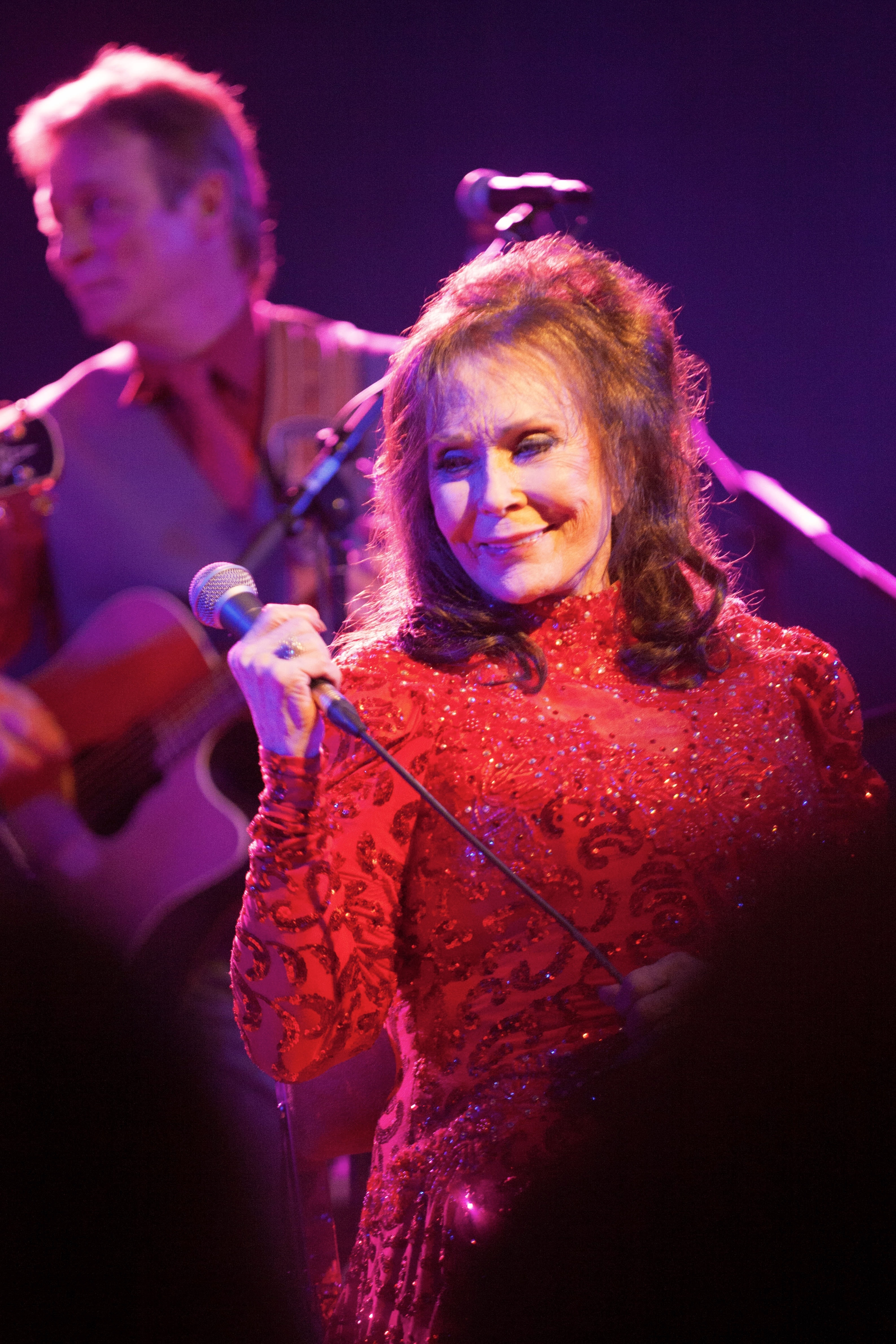
Loretta Lynn

The most successful female artist in the 1970s was Loretta Lynn, releasing her best-selling album Coal Miner's Daughter in 1970. She gained a total of seven number one albums, and 20 number one hit singles including her biggest hit single, 1970s "Coal Miner's Daughter," which went on to sell more than 500,000 copies to date. Several of Lynn's siblings gained national recording contracts, and it was her youngest sister, Crystal Gayle (born Brenda Gail Webb), who would become by far the most successful. Although she has recorded and/or performed traditional country, Gayle's primary style was country pop, and by forging her own path rather than mimicking her famous sister's style, she had several tremendously successful songs, most notably "Don't It Make My Brown Eyes Blue." Lynn also recorded with Conway Twitty multiple times during the 1970s, and had five No. 1 singles together, including "After the Fire Is Gone." Like Lynn, Twitty had family—in this case, his children—who also recorded and had songs make the top 40 of the Billboard country chart, but none of them had sustained, long-term success.

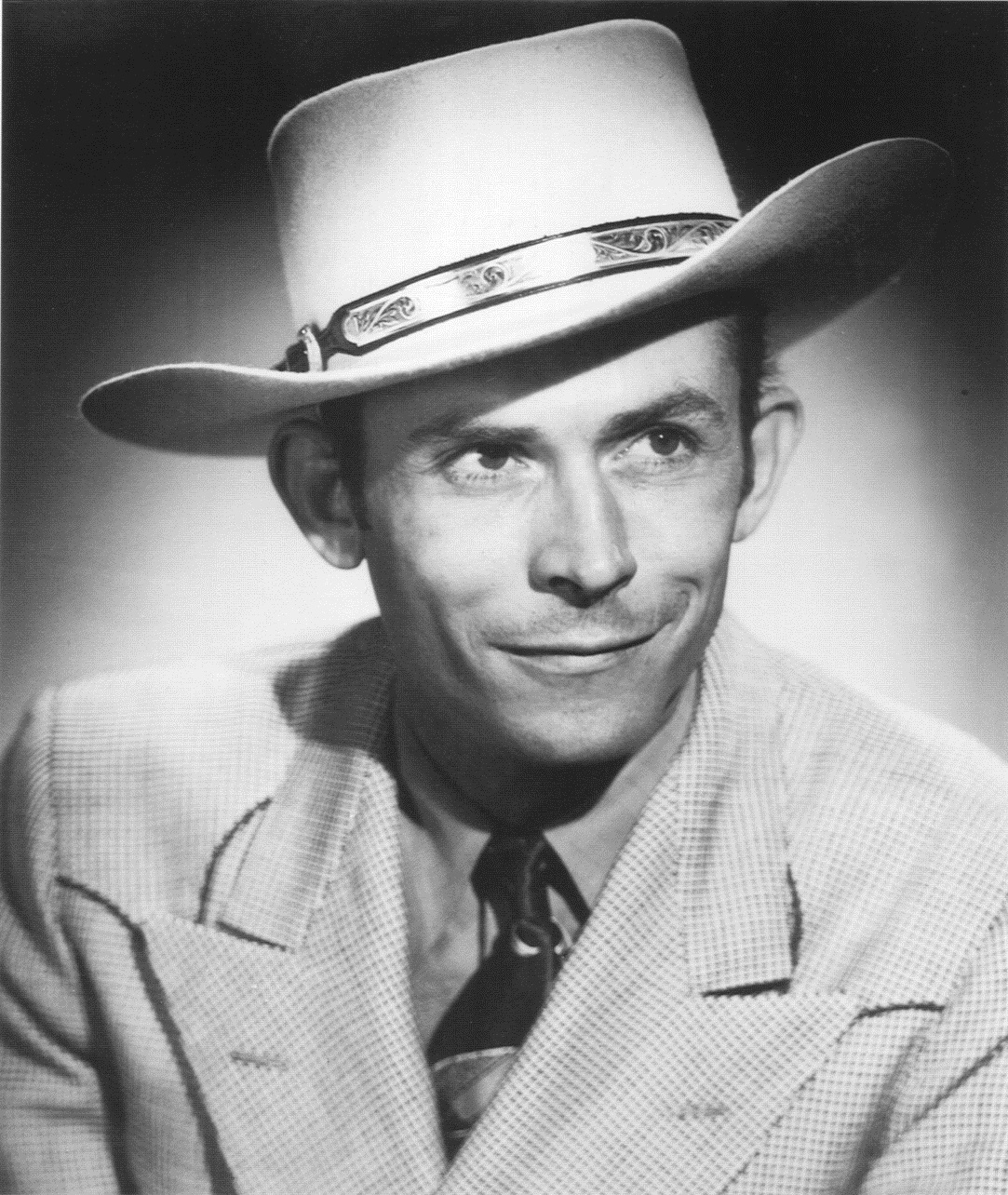
Hank Williams

Besides Lynn-Twitty duet pairing, there were other notable duet pairings during the 1970s, including George Jones and Tammy Wynette. Married in 1968, the two had their first duet hit together in 1972 with "Take Me" (a remake of Jones' 1965 solo hit), and went on to have three No. 1 hits together. The two went through an acrimonious divorce in 1975, due in part to Jones' increasingly erratic behavior worsened by substance abuse problems, but the two did continue recording together afterward, releasing their most successful hit, the ironic "Golden Ring" (a song about how a wedding ring is meaningless without true love) in 1976. As a solo artist, Jones continued to maintain his hold as the premiere honky-tonk artist of the genre, recording songs of broken relationships ("The Grand Tour," "The Door", and "Her Name Is") and bitterness ("These Days I Barely Get By"), but the aforementioned substance abuse and behavioral issues restrained his own success and by the end of the decade, his life was wildly out of control. Wynette, meanwhile, remarried to producer and songwriter George Richey, and continued to perform songs in her signature style, alternating between heartbreak and marital difficulty to loyalty and fidelity. Although she would have health and legal issues of her own, Wynette remained highly successful, achieving 10 of her 16 solo number one hits during the 1970s, including "'Til I Get It Right," "Another Lonely Song", and "'Til I Can Make It on My Own."

The 1970s continued a trend toward a proliferation of No. 1 hits on the Billboard Hot Country Singles chart. In 1970, there were 23 songs that reached the top spot on the chart, but by the mid-1970s, more than 40 titles rotated in and out of the top spot for the first time in history. The trend temporarily reversed itself by the late 1970s, when about 30 to 35 songs reached the pinnacle position of the chart annually.

==== Country rock and Southern rock ====
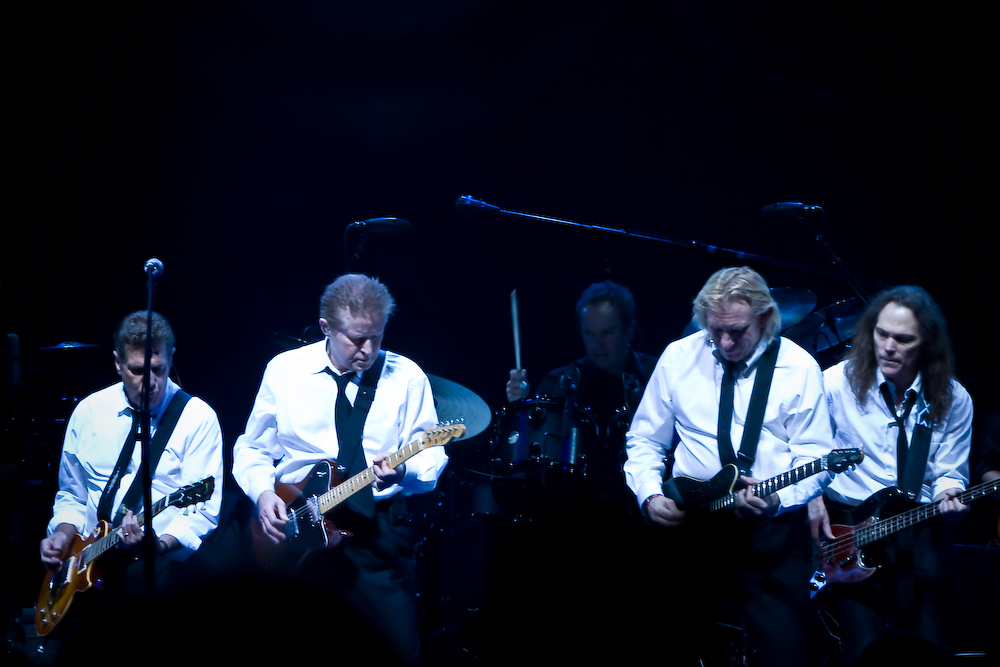
The Eagles

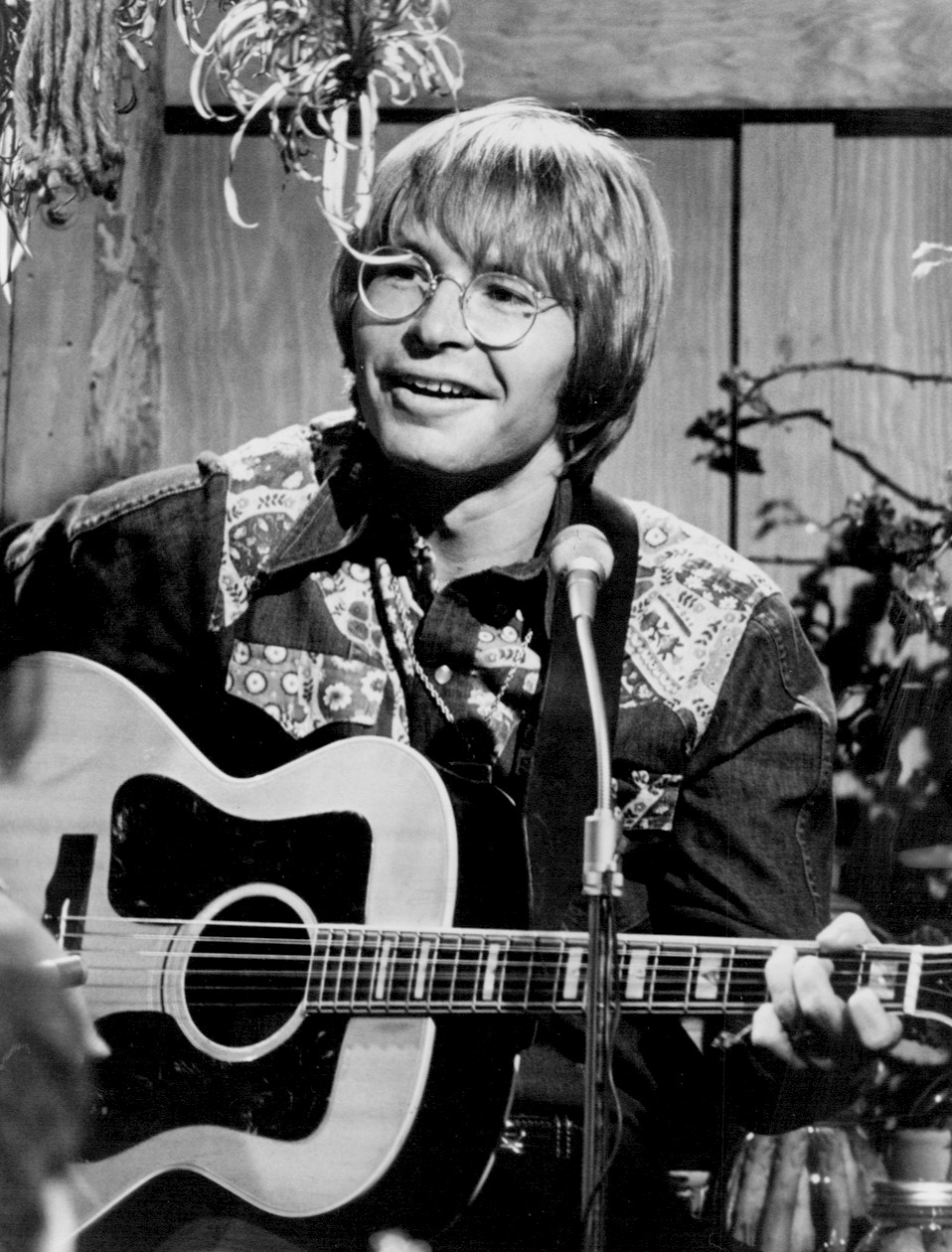
John Denver, 1975

Country rock, a subgenre of country music formed from the fusion of rock music with country music, gained its greatest commercial success in the 1970s, beginning with non-country artists such as Bob Dylan, Gram Parsons, and The Byrds. By the mid-1970s, Linda Ronstadt, along with other newer artists such as Emmylou Harris and The Eagles, were enjoying mainstream success and popularity that continues to this day. The Eagles themselves emerged as one of the most successful rock acts of all time, producing albums that included Hotel California (1976). The year 1975 was big for Ronstadt, Harris and the Eagles as each had their first top 10 country hits during the year: Ronstadt with a cover of Hank Williams' "I Can't Help It (If I'm Still In Love With You)," featuring Harris on backing vocals; Harris, with "If I Could Only Win Your Love"; and the Eagles with "Lyin' Eyes."

During the 1970s, a similar style of country rock called southern rock (fusing rock, country, and blues music, and focusing on electric guitars and vocals) was enjoying popularity with country audiences, thanks to such non-country acts as The Ozark Mountain Daredevils, Lynyrd Skynyrd, The Allman Brothers Band, and The Marshall Tucker Band.

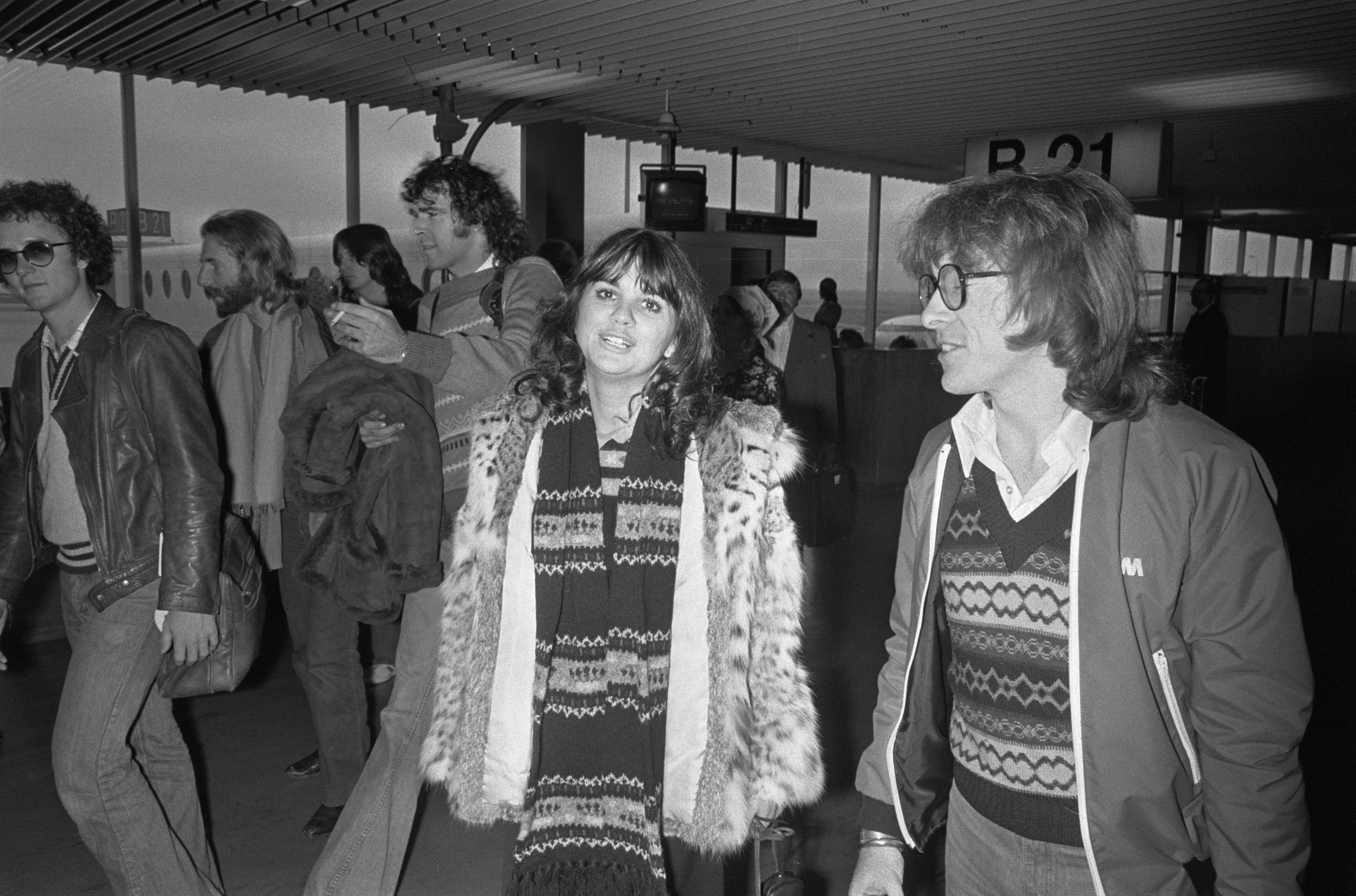
Linda Ronstadt in 1976

It was with both country rock and southern rock that Hank Williams Jr., a longtime stalwart of country music, used to resurrect his career. The son of pioneering legend Hank Williams, the younger Williams (who adopted the nickname "Bocephus," an affectionate nickname given to him by his father) recorded in a primarily countrypolitan style in the 1960s and early 1970s, including many of his famous father's songs and often performed in his father's style. By the mid-1970s, several career- and life-changing events shaped his future. He began recording and performing with recording artists including Waylon Jennings, Johnny Cash, and Charlie Daniels, and recorded a Southern rock-heavy album showcasing his new style called Hank Williams Jr. and Friends. On August 8, 1975, Williams was nearly killed in a mountain climbing accident on the Ajax Peak in southwestern Montana; his recovery took two years, and it was thereafter that he adopted his signature look – a beard, sunglasses, and a cowboy hat. In 1979, after a string of modestly-performing singles in his new style, he broke through with "Family Tradition," an autobiographical song about his heritage and new musical identity. Williams went on to become one of country music's top superstars of the 1980s and beyond with his blend of country, rock, Southern rock and blues, and with songs having themes of soul-searching, rebellion, wild living, and political and societal activism.

==== Notable deaths in country music ====
The decade saw the deaths of several country music performers, many who would come to be regarded as classic stars of the genre. The year 1975 was a particularly difficult year for the genre, as three key performers – Bob Wills, George Morgan, and Lefty Frizzell—all died within a two-month timespan. In 1977, Elvis Presley and Bing Crosby, two performers not directly identified as country but were vastly influential in and/or had substantial successes and fanbases in the genre, died within six weeks of each other. Within a seven-month time span from October 1978 to May 1979, four other notable performers died: Mel Street, a relative newcomer whose honky tonk stylings made him one of the decade's most promising new artists; "Mother" Maybelle and Sara Carter, of the pioneering Carter Family; and Lester Flatt, an early bluegrass pioneer who formed a successful partnership with Earl Scruggs.

=== Other developments ===
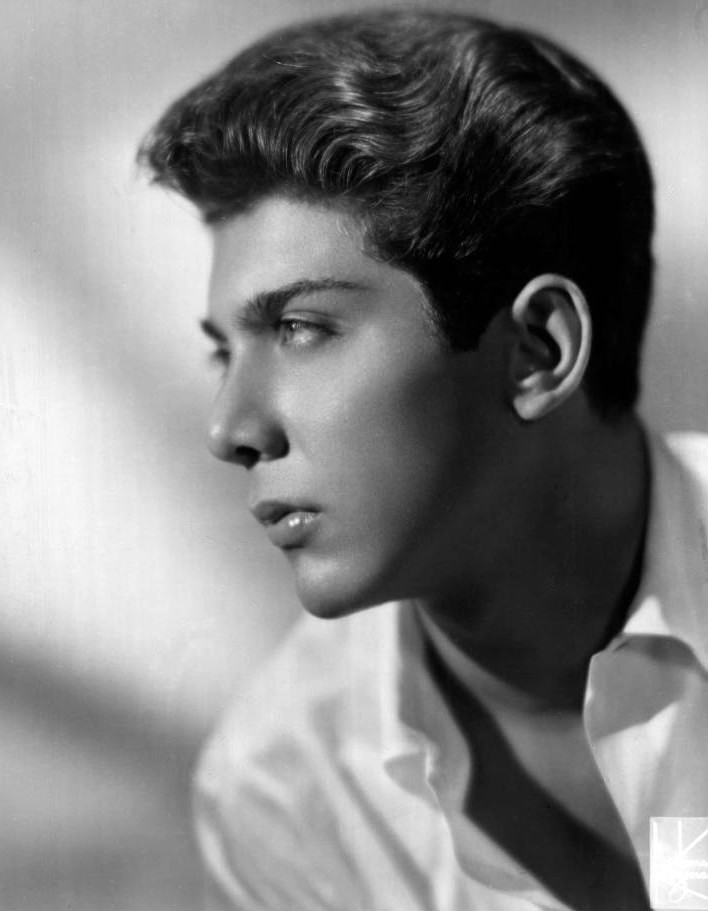
Paul Anka in 1961

The decade saw commercial success for blue-eyed soul artists, such as David Bowie who released the successful albums Young Americans (1975), which included the number one hit "Fame", and Station to Station (1976).

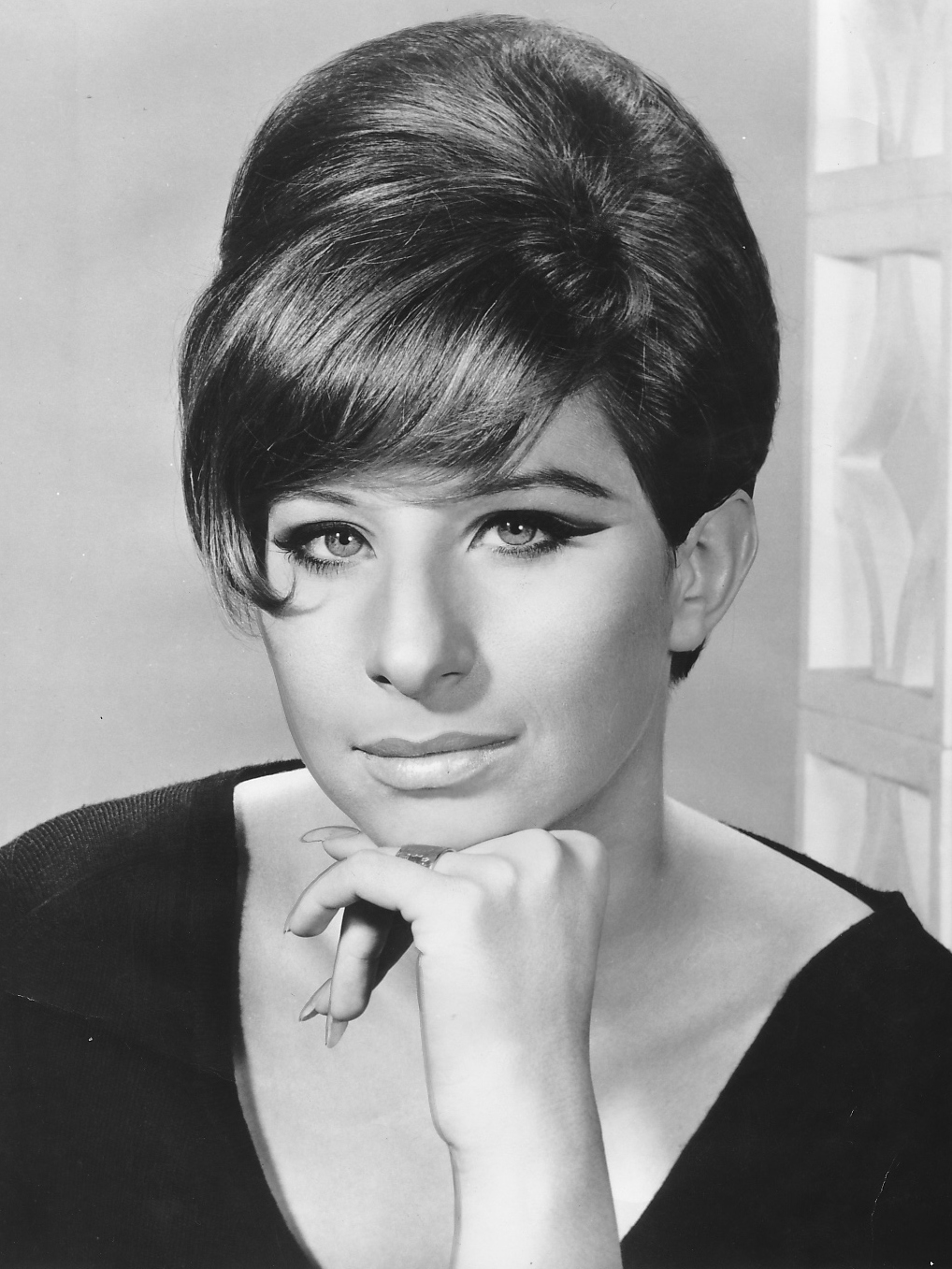
Barbra Streisand in 1966

In the second half of the decade, a 1950s nostalgia movement prompted the Rockabilly Revival fad. The Stray Cats led the revival into the early 1980s. Queen participated through their hit "Crazy Little Thing Called Love". Also symbolizing this trend was the hit movie Grease in 1978, starring John Travolta and Olivia Newton-John.

Tying in with the nostalgia craze, several stars of the late 1950s and early 1960s successfully revived their careers during the early- to mid-1970s after several years of inactivity. The most successful of these were Ricky Nelson ("Garden Party", 1972), Paul Anka ("(You're) Having My Baby", 1974), Neil Sedaka ("Laughter in the Rain" and "Bad Blood", both 1975), and Frankie Valli as both a solo artist (1975's "My Eyes Adored You") and with The Four Seasons (1976's "December 1963 (Oh, What A Night)"). In addition, Perry Como—one of the most successful pre-rock era artists—enjoyed continued success, albeit on a somewhat smaller scale (as most of his fans were adults who grew up during the 1940s and early 1950s, and not the rock record-buying youth); his most successful hits of the decade were "It's Impossible" (1970) and the Don McLean song "And I Love You So" (1973).

Two of popular music's most successful artists died within eight weeks of each other in 1977. Elvis Presley, the best-selling singer of all time, died on August 16, 1977. Presley's funeral was held at Graceland, on Thursday, August 18, 1977.

Bing Crosby, who sold about half a billion records, died October 14, 1977. His single, "White Christmas", remains as the best selling single of all time, confirmed by the Guinness Records.

The early seventies also marked the deaths of rock legends Jim Morrison, Janis Joplin, Jimi Hendrix, gospel great Mahalia Jackson, and Cass Elliot of the Mamas and the Papas. The decade also saw the plane crash in 1977 in which three members of Lynyrd Skynyrd were killed.

== Oceania ==
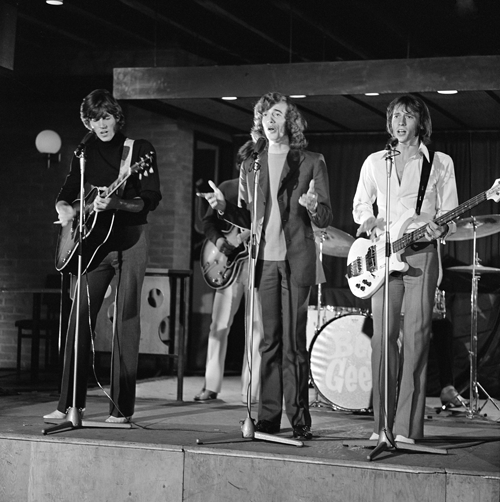
The Bee Gees, in 1968

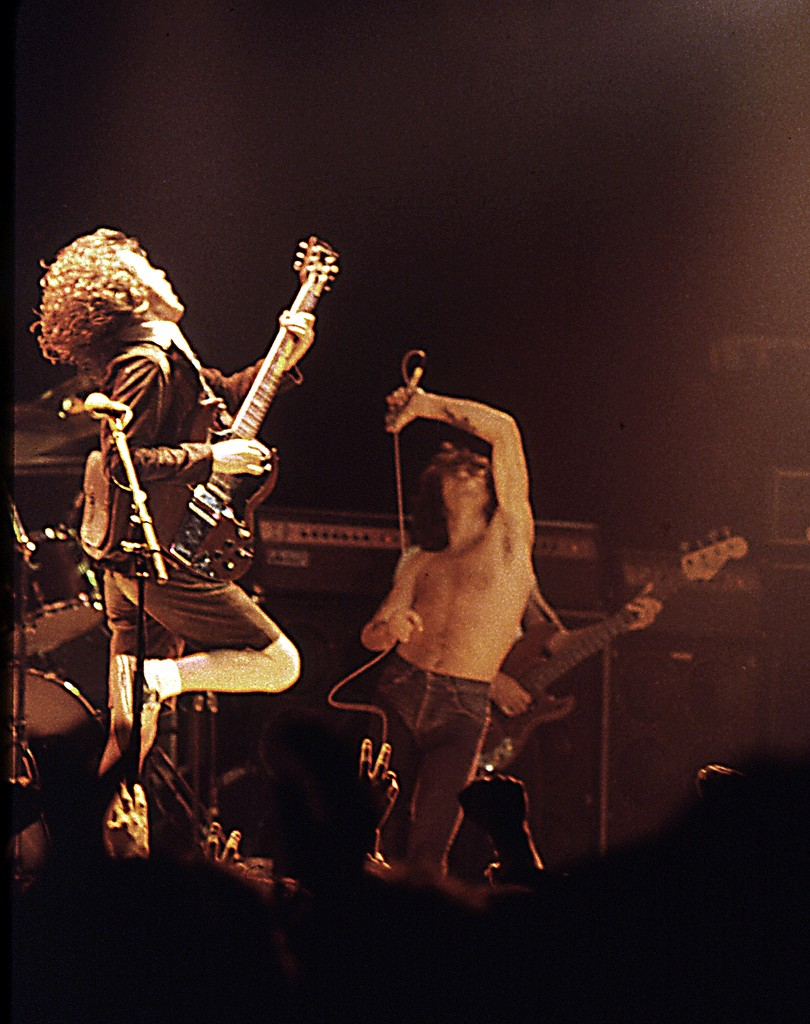
AC/DC, August 1979

The mid-to-late 1970s Australian band AC/DC became one of the most popular and successful acts in Australia, scoring a string of hits, albums and singles. They made their international debut in 1976 with High Voltage. The band quickly became successful outside their home country; the Highway to Hell album from 1979 peaked at number 13 on the Kent Music Report Albums Chart and they would continue as one of the most popular rock groups in the world through the following decade.

The Bee Gees were a British group who had moved to Australia which consisted of brothers Barry, Maurice, and Robin Gibb — a successful harmonic act as the 1970s dawned. Aside from the chart-topping "How Can You Mend a Broken Heart" in 1971, the brothers did not make much impact in the US during the first half of the decade and most of their record sales were in Europe, especially on the continent. With the failure of their 1973 album Life in a Tin Can, the Bee Gees appeared washed up. But in 1975, they rebounded with Main Course which added more of a beat to their songs and they began embracing the new disco sound in their next album Children of the World (1976). The musical film Saturday Night Fever (1977) finally propelled the Bee Gees to global superstar status with "Stayin' Alive", "More Than a Woman", and "Night Fever" (from the Saturday Night Fever soundtrack). The Gibbs' youngest brother, Andy, was a sensation with his own solo career. He made occasional appearances with his brothers and had hits with songs such as "I Just Want to Be Your Everything" and "Shadow Dancing".

The most successful female artist of the decade, English-Australian singer Olivia Newton-John, became a leading singer in the 1970s in both the pop and country genres and realized several number one hits, including the songs "Let Me Be There" and "I Honestly Love You" for which she received three Grammys.

Additional top music acts in Australia and New Zealand included Little River Band, Sherbet, Skyhooks, John Paul Young, Marcia Hines, Jon English, Stevie Wright, Richard Clapton, Dragon, Hush, and the Ted Mulry Gang.

== Asia ==
=== Japan ===
During the 1970s, Japan had the second largest music market in the world. 1970s Japanese music included kayōkyoku, idols and new music. Musical artists in the 1970s included, in particular, Momoe Yamaguchi, Saori Minami, the Candies, Pink Lady, Hiromi Go, Hideki Saijo, Yuming, Saki Kubota, Judy Ongg and Sachiko Kobayashi. The Best Ten began in 1978.

=== Chinese-speaking world ===
Cantopop emerged in 1970s Hong Kong, developing out of Cantonese opera and traditional-styled songs used in Cantonese-language soap operas, with strong influences from British and American soft rock. Cantopop would become Hong Kong's biggest cultural export, coupled on the popularity of Hong Kong soap operas across the Chinese-speaking world.

Mandopop in the 1970s was the most popular music genre in Taiwan, and was largely centered there as a result on the ban on most styles of Chinese popular music in mainland China from the 1950s until the late 1970s, where they were considered decadent "yellow music" in contrast to the revolutionary songs of the time. "The Moon Represents My Heart" (1977) by Teresa Teng was the first foreign song from Hong Kong and Taiwan (also called gangtai music) to break into mainland China following the reform and opening up, despite initial bans on her music as "bourgeois".

=== Southeast Asia ===
Indonesia in the 1970s saw the peak of Indian- and Arab-influenced dangdut, which flourished in the 1960s when Western pop music was then banned during the Guided Democracy era under Sukarno. Western-influenced Indo pop, which also emerged in the 1960s, developed further in the 1970s. Two forms of Indo pop, pop melankolis and pop kreatif, dominated Indonesia's music scene in the late 1970s and peaked in popularity in the 1980s.

The Philippines in the 1970s saw the development of Manila sound, associated with artists such as Cinderella, Hotdog, Sampaguita and VST & Company. Originally influenced by rock and roll and bubblegum pop, it became more influenced by disco and funk by the second half of the decade. Manila sound acts of the late 1970s began to closely imitate popular foreign artists of the time as like with the Boyfriends and Hagibis, which emulated the Bee Gees and the Village People respectively in their musical and visual style. Original Pilipino music (OPM), mostly sentimental ballads, developed in the mid-1970s, led by Apo Hiking Society, Rico J. Puno and Rey Valera, and became the dominant form of Filipino pop, helped by government-set local content quotas on radio that begun in 1973. Old-style Filipino pop, from artists such as Claire dela Fuente, Eva Eugenio, Imelda Papin, Eddie Peregrina and Victor Wood remained popular into the 1970s. Western-influenced Filipino folk rock from artists such as Freddie Aguilar, Celeste Legaspi, Coritha, Florante and Asin flourished in the 1970s and also served as a venue for resistance against the Marcos dictatorship. Aguilar's folk ballad "Anak" ("Child") was an international hit in 1978 and translated into 86 languages.

== Latin America, Caribbean and Africa ==
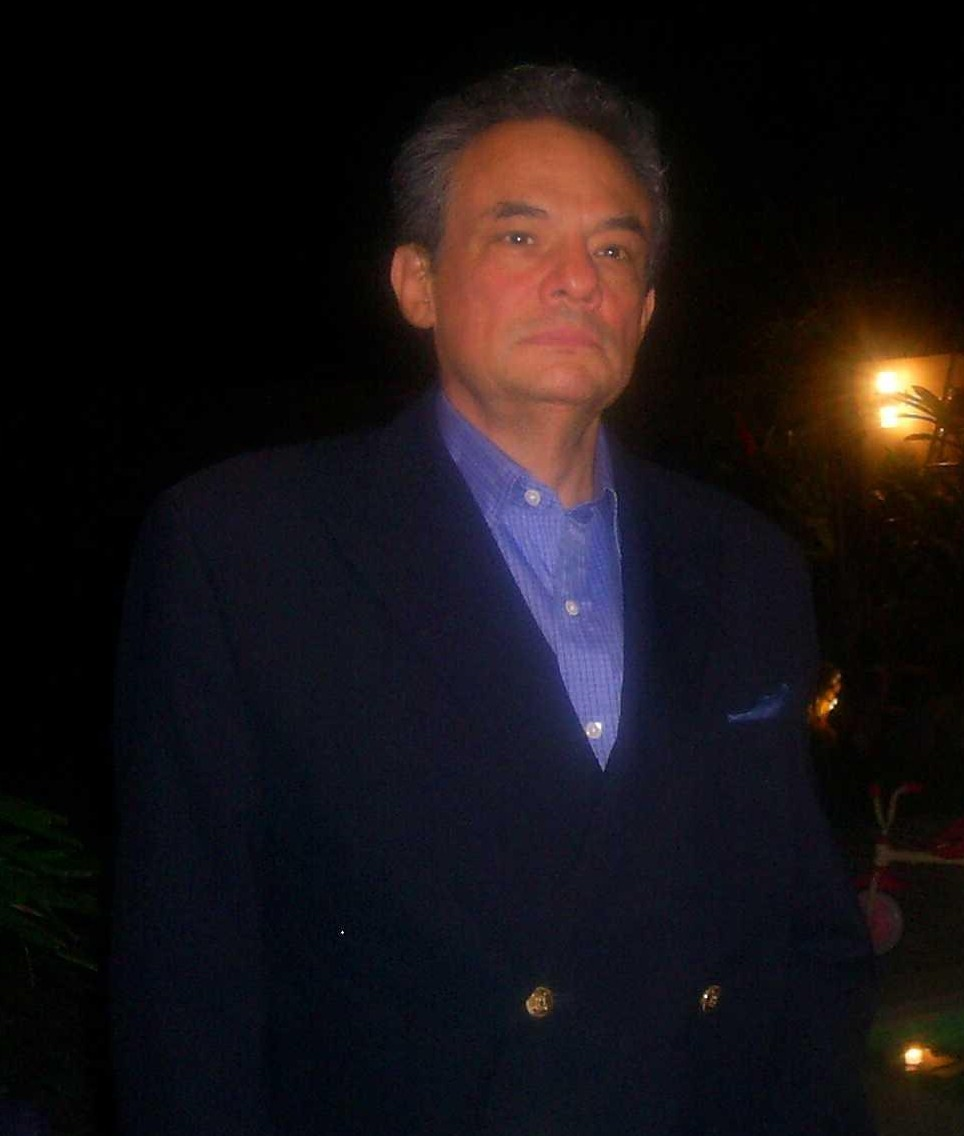
Jose Jose

Jose Jose big break came on 15 March 1970, when he represented Mexico in the international song festival the II Festival de la Canción Latina (Latin Song Festival II, predecessor of the OTI Festival) with a performance of the song "El Triste". Although José José finished in third place, his performance helped launch his music career to a wider audience. In 1971, Juan Gabriel released his first studio album El Alma Joven..., which included the song "No Tengo Dinero", which became his debut single and his first hit. Vicente Fernández's greatest hit was "Volver, volver," released in 1972; his first million-selling album was 1983's 15 Grandes con el número uno. Rolando Villazón is born.

=== Nueva canción ===
During the 1970s in Latin America, the 1960s music influence remained strong and two styles developed from it one that followed the European and North American trends and Nueva Canción that focused on the renewal of folklore including Andean music and cueca. Some bands such as Los Jaivas from Chile mixed both streams and created a syncretism between folklore and progressive rock. The Nueva Canción movement got an even more marked protest association after all countries in the Southern Cone became (or were already) military dictatorships in the 1970s. In Chile, the Nueva canción styles developed through the 1970s would remain popular until the return to democracy in 1990.

=== Rock ===
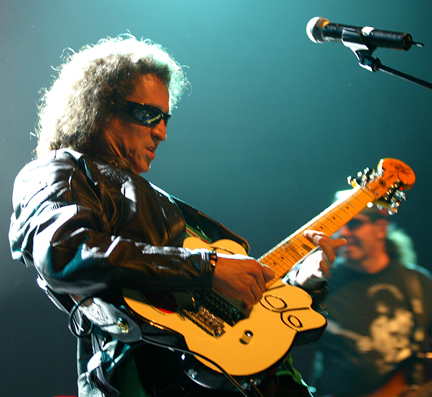
El Tri Band founder Alex Lora, on stage with the band in 2006

In the 1970s, rock en Español began to emerge (especially in Argentina), and as imitation bands became fewer, rock music started to develop more independently from the outside, although many rock bands still preferred to sing in English. The Argentine defeat in the Falklands War in 1982 followed by the fall of the mhilitary junta that year diminished need of Nueva Canción as protest music there in favour of other styles.

=== Tropical ===
Sonora Santanera is an orchestra playing tropical music from Mexico with over 60 years of history.

=== Reggae and Afrobeat ===
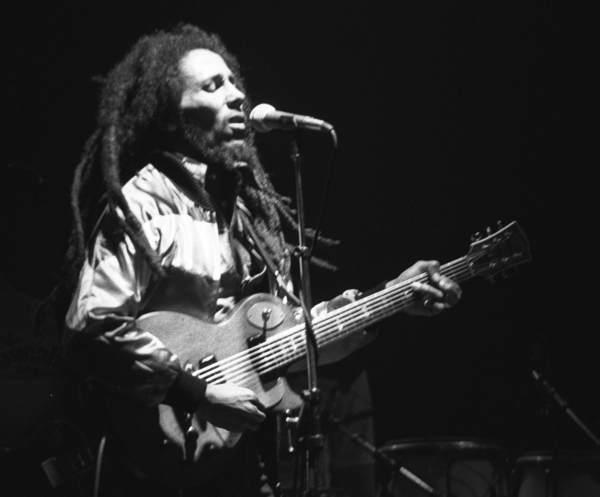
Bob Marley, 1980

The Wailers, a band started by Bob Marley, Peter Tosh and Bunny Wailer in 1963 which used to play ska and rocksteady music during the 1960s, became popular in the Caribbean, Europe and Africa since the early 1970s after they started playing reggae music. Later on, the band became very popular in the US. The Wailers broke up in 1974 with each of the three main members going on to pursue solo careers. Despite the break-up, Marley continued recording music under the name Bob Marley & The Wailers. In 1975, Marley had his international breakthrough with his first hit outside Jamaica, "No Woman, No Cry", from the Natty Dread album. The success of the album Exodus (1977), which included the major international hits "Jamming", "Turn Your Lights Down Low", and "One Love", propelled Marley to international stardom.

In addition to the Wailers, other significant pioneers include Prince Buster, Desmond Dekker, Jackie Mittoo, and several others.

Fela Anikulapo Kuti, or simply Fela, was a Nigerian human rights activist, political maverick, multi-instrumentalist, musician, and pioneer of the Afrobeat music genre. He has been called "superstar, singer, musician, Panafricanist, polygamist, mystic, legend." During the height of his popularity, he was often hailed as one of Africa's most "challenging and charismatic music performers."

=== Cumbia ===
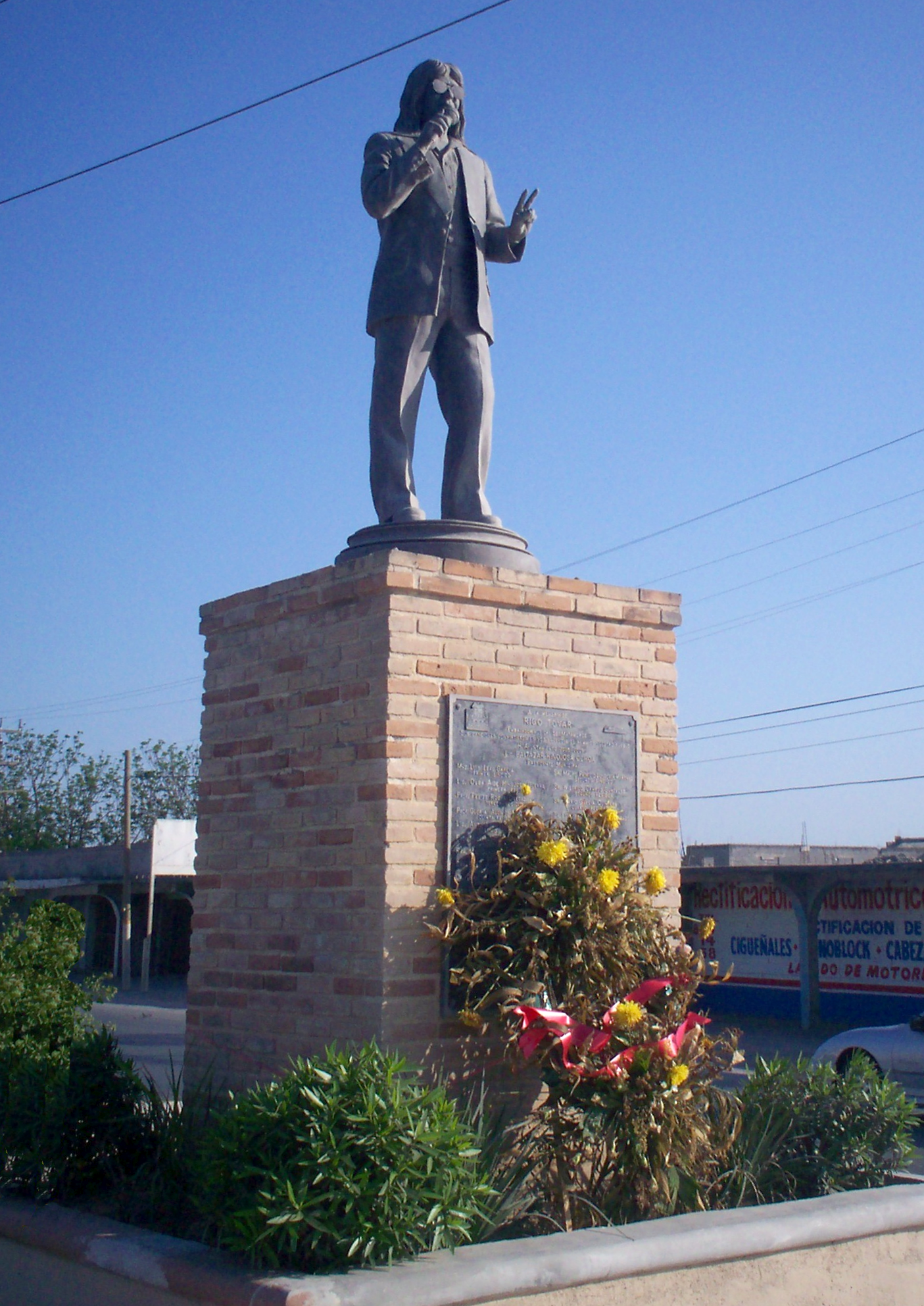
Rigo Tovar

It was during the 1970s the cumbia became widely popular outside Colombia. Several bands brought Cumbia to Mexico, Peru, Argentina, and Chile places that later became major scenes for further developments of cumbia music. While Nueva Canción was the music of the New Left and the rock developments of Argentina reflected the European oriented youth, cumbia became widely popular among the large poor sectors of Latin American countries, to such degree that it came to be associated with shantytowns and low-prestige Native American populations.

=== Salsa and merengue ===
Salsa music developed in the 1960s and 1970s by Puerto Rican and Cuban immigrants to the New York City area but did not enter into mainstream popularity in Latin America until the late 1980s. The merengue music experienced during the late 1970s was a golden age of productivity characterized by the rise of a new generation of musicians.

== Other trends ==
The commercial cinemas around the world tended to imitate nuances of disco beats in their movies to present their movies as western and upbeat. These included the increasingly popular kung-fu movies in far East Asia and Bollywood movies from India. These trends are essential in proving that commercial cinemas were a beneficial investment for the community.

== See also ==
- 1960s in music
- 1980s in music
- 1990s in music
