= Special Collection =

Special Collection may refer to:

== Libraries ==
- Special collections, collections of library materials that require specialized security and user services

== Intelligence ==
- Special Collection Service joint U.S. Central Intelligence Agency-National Security Agency program

== Music ==
- Special Collection, compilation album by Anne Murray, 2006
- Special Collection (Garbage EP), 2002
- 20 Hits Special Collection, Vol. 1, greatest hits album by Hank Williams Jr.
