= Love in Hong Kong =

Studio album by Teresa Teng
- Released: December 19, 1977
- Recorded: 1977
- Genre: Mandopop
- Length: 45:05
- Language: Mandarin
- Labels: Polydor; Kolin Records

Teresa Teng chronology
Light Rain (1977)	Love in Hong Kong (1977)	Let Love Be More Beautiful (1978)

Singles from Love in Hong Kong
- 1. "The Moon Represents My Heart" Released: December 19, 1977

Love in Hong Kong
- Chinese: 香港之戀
Transcriptions
Standard Mandarin
- Hanyu Pinyin: Xiānggǎng zhī liàn

Love in Hong Kong (Chinese: 香港之戀; pinyin: Xiānggǎng zhī liàn), also titled Love Songs of the Island, Vol. 4: Love in Hong Kong, is a Mandarin studio album recorded by Taiwanese singer Teresa Teng. It was released via Polydor Records Hong Kong on December 19, 1977. The album features the hit single "The Moon Represents My Heart", which went on to become a Mandopop classic.

== Background and release ==
Love in Hong Kong was released through Polydor Records on December 19, 1977. It is labelled as Love Songs of the Island, Vol. 4: Love in Hong Kong (島國之情歌第四集：香港之戀), serving as the fourth record of her "Love Songs of the Island" album series under Polydor. The album spawned the single "The Moon Represents My Heart", a cover of Taiwanese singer Chen Fen-lan's 1973 song of the same name. It was written by Sun Yi and composed by Weng Cheng-hsi.

== Reception ==
Love in Hong Kong received a platinum certification from the International Federation of the Phonographic Industry (IFPIHK) Hong Kong in 1979. At the 1978 RTHK Top 10 Gold Songs Awards held in Hong Kong, the ceremony's first edition, "Love in a Small Village" was one of the Top 10 Songs Award winners.

== Legacy ==
Teng's music began to spread rapidly across mainland China in 1978, when the country instituted the open door policy that allowed gangtai cultural products to enter its borders. Professor of East Asian Studies Nimrod Baranovitch wrote that "'The Moon Represents My Heart' was the antithesis of the songs that people on the mainland had been listening to and singing in the previous thirty years or so". Its lyrics were centered around love and romance, "a theme that had almost disappeared from the popular music scene on the mainland after 1949 because of its association with 'decadent' 'bourgeois individualism.'" After the gradual opening of China's music market to gangtai artists following the Cultural Revolution, Baranovitch remarked that many of the most famous songs were those sung by Teng.

== Track listing ==
Side A
No.	Title	Length
1.	"Love in a Small Village" (小村之戀; Xiǎocūn zhī liàn)	3:46
2.	"Rain Never Stops, Feel Uncertain" (雨不停心不定; Yǔ bù tíng xīn bùdìng)	3:26
3.	"The Moon Represents My Heart" (月亮代表我的心; Yuèliàng dàibiǎo wǒ de xīn)	3:25
4.	"You and Me Together" (你我相伴左右; Nǐ wǒ xiāngbàn zuǒyòu)	4:41
5.	"Thank You For Always Remembering Me" (謝謝你常記得我; Xièxiè nǐ cháng jìdé wǒ)	3:39
6.	"Let the Flowers Bloom For You" (讓花兒為你開; Ràng huā er wèi nǐ kāi)	3:37
Total length:		22:34

Side B
No.	Title	Length
7.	"Hong Kong Night" (香港之夜; Xiānggǎng zhī yè)	3:36
8.	"I Know You" (我瞭解你; Wǒ liàojiě nǐ)	3:52
9.	"See You Again Snowflakes" (又見雪花; Yòu jiàn xuěhuā)	3:18
10.	"That Promise" (那句諾言; Nà jù nuòyán)	3:52
11.	"Sunset Asks Where You Are" (夕陽問你在那裡; Xīyáng wèn nǐ zài nàlǐ)	4:06
12.	"Destined in Previous Life" (前生有緣; Qián shēng yǒuyuán)	3:47
Total length:		45:05

== Certifications ==
Region	Certification	Certified units/sales
Hong Kong (IFPI Hong Kong)	Platinum	50,000^{*}
^{*} Sales figures based on certification alone.
