= Out of Left Field =

Studio album by Hank Williams Jr.
- Released: March 9, 1993
- Recorded: 1992–1993
- Studio: Emerald Sound Studios, Mesa Recording Studios, Sound Shop Studio, and Woodland Digital Studios Nashville, TN
- Length: 34:08
- Label: Curb/Capricorn
- Producer: Barry Beckett; James Stroud; Hank Williams Jr.

Hank Williams Jr. chronology
Maverick (1992)	Out of Left Field (1993)	Tribute to My Father (1993)

Professional ratings
Review scores
Source	Rating
Allmusic	3/5 stars

Out of Left Field is the forty-fifth studio album by American musician Hank Williams Jr. It was released by Curb/Capricorn Records on March 9, 1993. "Everything Comes Down to Money and Love" and "Diamond Mine" were released as singles. The album peaked at number 25 on the Billboard Top Country Albums chart.

== Track listing ==
1. "Everything Comes Down to Money and Love" (Dave Loggins, Gove Scrivenor) – 3:31
2. "Diamond Mine" (Michael Bornheim, Gerry House, Devon O'Day) – 3:21
3. "Blue Lady in a Red Mercedes" (Buck Moore, Troy Seals, Dan Toler) – 2:53
4. "Both Sides of Goodbye" (Jackson Leap, Kim Williams) – 3:26
5. "Warm in Dallas" (Hank Williams Jr.) – 3:16
6. "Out of Left Field" (Spooner Oldham, Dan Penn) – 3:49
7. "Hide and Seek" (Hank Williams Jr.) – 3:25
8. "Hold What You've Got" (Joe Tex) – 3:37
9. "I'm Tired" (Jack Daniels, Nesbett Lashburn, Dink Suggins, Paul Worley) – 3:17
10. "Dirty Mind" (Hank Williams Jr.) – 3:33

== Personnel ==
- Eddie Bayers – drums, snare drums
- Barry Beckett – keyboards
- Gary Burr – background vocals
- Vicki Hampton – background vocals
- Yvonne Hodges – background vocals
- Dann Huff – baritone guitar, electric guitar
- John Barlow Jarvis – keyboards
- Chris Leuzinger – baritone guitar, electric guitar
- "Cowboy" Eddie Long – steel guitar
- Donna McElroy – background vocals
- Carl Marsh – Fairlight
- Phil Naish – keyboards
- Don Potter – acoustic guitar
- Michael Rhodes – bass guitar
- Tom Roady – percussion
- Brent Rowan – baritone guitar, electric guitar
- Harry Stinson – background vocals
- Hank Williams Jr. – acoustic guitar, lead vocals
- Dennis Wilson – background vocals
- Curtis Young – background vocals
- Reggie Young – baritone guitar, electric guitar

== Chart performance ==
Chart (1993)	Peak position
U.S. Billboard Top Country Albums	25
U.S. Billboard 200	121
