= Family Tradition (album) =

Studio album by Hank Williams Jr.
- Released: April 17, 1979
- Recorded: 1978
- Studios: Wally Heider (Hollywood, California); Heritage (Hollywood, California); Sound Labs Inc. (Hollywood, California); Woodland (Nashville, Tennessee); Glaser/Wishbone (Nashville, Tennessee)
- Genre: Country
- Length: 31:13
- Label: Elektra/Curb
- Producers: Jimmy Bowen (tracks 6–9); Phil Gernhard (track 10); Ray Ruff (tracks 1–5)

Hank Williams Jr. chronology
The New South (1977)	Family Tradition (1979)	Whiskey Bent and Hell Bound (1979)

Singles from Family Tradition
- 1. "I Fought the Law" Released: 1978; 2. "Old Flame, New Love" Released: 1978; 3. "Family Tradition" Released: May 28, 1979; 4. "To Love Somebody" Released: January 1979

Professional ratings
Review scores
Source	Rating
AllMusic	4/5 stars
Christgau's Record Guide	C
The Rolling Stone Album Guide	4/5 stars

Family Tradition is a studio album by American musician Hank Williams Jr. It was released in April 1979 by Curb Records, his third studio album for the label.

== Composition ==
Family Tradition shows influences from R&B and soul music.

== Critical and commercial success ==
Family Tradition was a significant success, both critically and commercially for Williams. It peaked at number 3 on the Billboard Top Country Albums chart, making it Williams' first Top 5 album since 1969's Live at Cobo Hall. Four of the ten tracks were released as singles, the first single being "I Fought the Law". "I Fought the Law" was originally a hit for the rock & roll group The Bobby Fuller Four in the early 1960s and the song was a moderate success for Williams, peaking at number 15 on the Billboard Hot Country Singles & Tracks chart. The follow-up singles, "Old Flame, New Fire" and "To Love Somebody" had little success, only peaking at number 54 and number 49 respectively. The final single, the album's title track, "Family Tradition", would become one of Williams' most popular and recognized songs. It peaked at number 4 on the Hot Country Singles & Tracks chart, his first Top 10 single since 1974. Williams' performance received rave reviews by critics and he received his first Grammy nomination for Best Country Vocal Performance, Male. The album was also a significant commercial success for Williams, becoming only his second album to be certified Gold by the RIAA.

== Track listing ==
All music is composed by Hank Williams Jr., except where noted.

No.	Title	Writer(s)	Length
1.	"To Love Somebody"	Barry Gibb, Robin Gibb	3:08
2.	"Old Flame, New Fire"	Oskar Solomon	2:37
3.	"Always Loving You"	Steve Young	4:26
4.	"We Can Work It All Out"		2:20
5.	"I Fought the Law"	Sonny Curtis	2:25
6.	"Family Tradition"		4:01
7.	"Only Daddy That'll Walk the Line"	Jimmy Bryant	3:18
8.	"Paying on Time"	Allen Reynolds, Hank Williams Jr.	3:13
9.	"I've Got Rights"		3:35
10.	"I Just Ain't Been Able"		2:35

== Singles ==
Year	Single	US Country
1978	"I Fought the Law"	15
1978	"Old Flame, New Fire"	54
1979	"To Love Somebody"	49
1979	"Family Tradition"	4

== Personnel ==
- Hank Williams, Jr. - vocals, guitar
- Reggie Young - electric guitar
- Al Bruno, Jay Graydon, Jerry Wallace - guitar
- Mac McAnally, Richard Bennett - acoustic guitar
- Brad Felton - steel guitar
- Bob Wray, Ray Pohlman, Reinie Press - bass
- Charlie Daniels - fiddle
- Alan Lindgren, Clayton Ivey, Don Randi, Greg Mathieson - keyboards
- Billy M. Thomas, Chet McCracken, Roger Clark - drums
- King Errisson - percussion
- Muscle Shoals Horns - horns
- Carol Chase, Jim Dugan, Karen McClain, Pam Johnze, Pat Erickson, Susie Allanson - background vocals
- David Turner, Henry Ferber, James Getzoff, Murray Adler, Robert Lee Adcock, Sid Sharp, William Kurasch - violin
- Jesse Ehrlich, Judy Perett, Raymond Kelley, Robert Lee Adcock - cello
- Richard Hieronymus, John D'Andrea - arrangements

Technical

- Jerry Hall, Leslie King, Mary Beth McLemore, Michael Lietz, Ron Treat - engineer
- Jim Shea - photography

== Charts ==
=== Weekly charts ===
Chart (1979)	Peak position
US Top Country Albums (Billboard)	3

=== Year-end charts ===
Chart (1979)	Position
US Top Country Albums (Billboard)	42
Chart (1980)	Position
US Top Country Albums (Billboard)	8

== Certifications ==
Region	Certification	Certified units/sales
United States (RIAA)	Gold	500,000^{^}
^{^} Shipments figures based on certification alone.
