= Tribute to My Father =

1993 album

Studio album by Hank Williams Jr.
- Released: September 21, 1993
- Genre: Country
- Length: 31:44
- Label: Curb Records

Hank Williams Jr. chronology
Out of Left Field (1993)	Tribute to My Father (1993)	Hog Wild (1995)

Tribute to My Father is an album by American country music artist Hank Williams Jr. It was released on September 21, 1993 by Curb Records.

== Track listing ==
1. "Honky Tonkin'" – 2:18
2. "Are You Sure Hank Done It This Way" – 3:08
3. "Lovesick Blues" – 2:14
4. "Ballad of Hank Williams" – 3:24
5. "A Whole Lot of Hank" – 2:57
6. "Kaw-Liga" – 4:25
7. "Move It On Over" – 3:09
8. "The Conversation" – 3:54
9. "You're Gonna Change (Or I'm Gonna Leave)" – 3:55
10. "If You Don't Like Hank Williams" – 2:51
