= Whiskey Bent and Hell Bound (album) =

Studio album by Hank Williams Jr.
- Released: October 1979
- Recorded: 1979
- Studio: Wishbone (Muscle Shoals, Alabama; Glaser Sound (Nashville, Tennessee)
- Genre: Country, Outlaw country
- Length: 30:27
- Label: Elektra/Curb (Reissue)
- Producer: Jimmy Bowen

Hank Williams Jr. chronology
Family Tradition (1979)	Whiskey Bent and Hell Bound (1979)	Habits Old and New (1980)

Singles from Whiskey Bent and Hell Bound
- 1. "Whiskey Bent and Hell Bound" Released: September 24, 1979; 2. "Women I've Never Had" Released: March 1980

Whiskey Bent and Hell Bound is a studio album by American musician Hank Williams Jr., and his fourth on the Elektra/Curb labels. It was Williams' second album of 1979, with Family Tradition released in April.

Released in November 1979, Whiskey Bent and Hell Bound peaked at number 5 on the Billboard Top Country Albums chart, his second consecutive Top 5 for the label and only his second Top 5 album since 1969's Live at Cobo Hall. It was certified Platinum by the RIAA, marking it as his third Gold album certification and his first Platinum album. The album generated two major hit singles, the title track and "Women I've Never Had", that peaked at number 2 and number 5 on the Billboard Hot Country Singles & Tracks chart and would become two of Williams' most well known and popular songs.

== Critical reception ==
Professional ratings
Review scores
Source	Rating
AllMusic	4.5/5 stars
Christgau's Record Guide	B+
The Rolling Stone Album Guide	4/5 stars

Reviewing in Christgau's Record Guide: Rock Albums of the Seventies (1981), Robert Christgau wrote: "At times his son-of-an-outlaw obsession is worse than shtick, but here he does justice to the formula. Two candid songs about women tell you more about his sexism than he knows himself, two others explain why he's in that mood, the covers from Gregg Allman and George Jones define his parameters, and 'The Conversation'—with Waylon Guess Who, about Guess Who, Sr.—doesn't make you gag once." In 2006, CMT ranked it #16 on its list of the top 40 albums in country music history.

== Track listing ==
All songs written by Hank Williams Jr., except where noted.

No.	Title	Writer(s)	Length
1.	"Whiskey Bent and Hell Bound"		3:09
2.	"Tired of Being Johnny B. Good"		2:35
3.	"Outlaw Women"		3:02
4.	"(I Don't Have) Anymore Love Songs"		2:24
5.	"White Lightnin'"	J.P. Richardson	2:21
6.	"Women I've Never Had"		2:52
7.	"O.D.'d in Denver"		2:40
8.	"Come and Go Blues"	Gregg Allman	4:05
9.	"Old Nashville Cowboy"	Rock Killough, Billy Earl McClelland	3:04
10.	"The Conversation"	Richie Albright, Waylon Jennings, Hank Williams Jr.	3:51

== Singles ==
Year	Single	US Country
1979	"Whiskey Bent and Hell Bound"	2
1980	"Women I've Never Had"	5

== Personnel ==
- Guitar: James Burton, Rock Killough, Hank Williams Jr., Reggie Young. Mandolin: Kieran Kane
- Bass: Joe Osborn
- Keyboards: David Briggs, Larry Knechtel
- Drums: Larrie Londin
- Harmonica: Rock Killough
- Horns: John Gore, Jim Horn, Irving Kane, Terry Mead
- Viola: Buddy Spicher
- Additional Vocals: Waylon Jennings

== Production ==
- Produced By Jimmy Bowen
- Engineered By Jimmy Bowen & Ron Treat
- Ethan Russell - photography

== Charts ==
Chart performance for Whiskey Bent and Hell Bound
Chart (1980)	Peak position
US Top Country Albums (Billboard)	5

== Certifications ==
Region	Certification	Certified units/sales
United States (RIAA)	Platinum	1,000,000^{^}
^{^} Shipments figures based on certification alone.
