= The Moon Represents My Heart =

1977 song by Teresa Teng

Single by Chen Fen-lan

from the album Dreamland
- Language: Mandarin
- Released: May 1973
- Genre: Mandopop
- Length: 3:27
- Label: Li Ge Records
- Composer: Weng Ching-hsi
- Lyricist: Sun Yi

Music video
- 月亮代表我的心 on YouTube

"The Moon Represents My Heart" (Chinese: 月亮代表我的心; pinyin: Yuèliang Dàibiǎo Wǒ de Xīn) is a song originally recorded by Taiwanese singer Chen Fen-lan for her album Dreamland, which was released through Li Ge Records in May 1973. It was then re-recorded by fellow Taiwanese recording artist Liu Guan-lin in November 1973. The song was eventually made famous throughout the Sinophone world by musician Teresa Teng in 1977.

Teng's recording of "The Moon Represents My Heart" was one of the first foreign songs to achieve widespread popularity in mainland China following the Cultural Revolution and the initiation of the Open Door Policy in 1978. It is often cited as one of the most famous and beloved Chinese songs of all time. During the 2010 Chinese Music Awards, it was ranked first amongst the greatest Chinese musical works of the past 30 years. The song has been covered by many artists around the world and has been featured in numerous films and television productions.

== Background and development ==
"The Moon Represents My Heart" was composed by Weng Ching-hsi (翁清溪) while its lyrics were written by Sun Yi (孫儀). During Weng's time at the Berklee College of Music in Boston, he would frequently find himself in the nearby parks, drawing creative inspiration from his surroundings. Whenever inspiration struck, he would record his thoughts and experiences. Upon his return to Taiwan, Weng chose one of his musical compositions and presented it to his friend, lyricist Sun Yi.

Initially, "The Moon Represents My Heart" was a composition that Weng deemed not as good and even considered discarding. Sun Yi then stumbled upon it among a pile of works meant for disposal, and was taken aback as he believed it was a quality song. After Sun penned the lyrics, both Weng and Sun sold the song to Li Ge Records in 1972. It was first sung by Taiwanese singer Chen Fen-lan for the singer's album, Dreamland (夢鄉) in May 1973, and then by fellow singer Liu Guan-lin (劉冠霖) in November of the same year. The song was made famous through Teresa Teng's version in 1977.

== Teresa Teng version ==
Teresa Teng recorded "The Moon Represents My Heart" for her Mandarin studio album, Love Songs of the Island, Vol. 4: Love in Hong Kong. The record was released through Polydor Hong Kong on 19 December 1977.

=== Composition ===
"The Moon Represents My Heart"

Single by Teresa Teng

from the album Love Songs of the Island, Vol. 4: Love in Hong Kong
- Language: Mandarin
- Released: 19 December 1977
- Genre: Mandopop
- Length: 3:29
- Label: Polydor; Kolin Records
- Composer: Weng Ching-hsi
- Lyricist: Sun Yi

Audio sample
- file; help

Teng's rendition of "The Moon Represents My Heart", which is three minutes and 27 seconds long, was described as a "love song with a waltz-like lilt". Anthropologist Kevin Latham characterized "The Moon Represents My Heart" as a relatively simple love ballad, similar to the majority of gangtai songs from the era. In The Semantics of Chinese Music, linguist Adrian Tien observed that the metaphor of the moon has been used in Chinese culture to express sorrow over lost love or the anticipation of a reunion "since the dawn of history". He noted that the imagery frequently appears in various literary works, and cited "The Moon Represents My Heart" as an exemplary instance of its usage in contemporary songs.

=== Cultural and societal impact ===
Until the late 1970s, foreign music had not been allowed into mainland China for several decades. "The Moon Represents My Heart" became one of the first popular foreign songs from Hong Kong and Taiwan (called "gangtai" songs) in the country. Teng's songs over the following decade revolutionized music in China. Her singing, described as "soft, melodious, often whispery and restrained," was considered the "ideal" in gangtai music at that time. The style was in striking contrast to the then officially sanctioned songs in mainland China which were often revolutionary songs, and made a strong impact on its listeners. She became so popular that "within months the country was literally flooded with [her] songs." "The Moon Represents My Heart", however, is often cited as one of her best-known or most popular pieces.

Prior to the emergence of Teng's music, such romantic songs had been virtually nonexistent in China for many years as they were considered "bourgeois and decadent". Shelley Rigger, writing in The Tiger Leading the Dragon: How Taiwan Propelled China's Economic Rise, highlighted that while her popularity was growing across the Chinese-speaking world, the leaders of the People's Republic of China (PRC) were attempting to suppress her music. However, Teng's songs remained irresistible; by the end of the 1970s, it was said that "Deng [Xiaoping] the leader ruled by day, but Deng the singer [Teresa Teng] ruled by night".

Teng's widespread popularity was recognized for paving the way for an influx of Taiwanese music into the PRC, so much so that it was referred to as a "counter invasion". Lauren Gorfinkel, writing in Chinese Television and National Identity Construction, wrote how Teng subsequently became a symbol of unity in Greater China as well as China's opening up and reforms. As film director Jia Zhangke later said, "'The Moon Represents My Heart' [was] something completely new. So people of my generation were suddenly infected with this very personal, individual world. Before that, everything was collective...".

The song was played at the entrance of the state dinner of the 2026 state visit by Xi Jinping to the United States.

=== Legacy ===
"The Moon Represents My Heart" has been performed frequently around the world since its release by famous singers and musicians such as Hayley Westenra, Nana Mouskouri, Katherine Jenkins, Shila Amzah, Faye Wong, David Tao, Andy Lau, Leslie Cheung, Jon Bon Jovi, Siti Nurhaliza, David Archuleta, English vocal group Libera and Grammy Award winning American musician Kenny G. According to NetEase, almost all singers in Hong Kong have covered the song at some point. It is considered a "classic" in the Sinophone world, with The Star writing that "Chinese all around the world are familiar with [it]." It is often cited as "one of the most famous and beloved Chinese songs of all time".

"The Moon Represents My Heart" was honored first place in Hong Kong Golden Songs Awards ranking of the Top 10 Chinese Golden Songs of the 20th Century. At the 2010 Chinese Music Awards, it was ranked number one by critics in a ranking of the greatest classic Chinese songs of the past 30 years. The song is also popular in karaoke, with one chain in Singapore listing it at number 42 on their hits list (which made it the highest ranked of all Teng's songs). In 2019, the Museum of Chinese in America (MOCA) in New York City curated an exhibition titled "The Moon Represents My Heart: Music, Memory and Belonging", which was directly inspired by the song. The exhibition highlighted the "transformative power" of musical identity within Chinese immigrant communities since the 1850s.

=== Credits and personnel ===
- Teresa Teng – vocalist
- Weng Ching-hsi – composer
- Sun Yi – lyricist

== Copyright status ==
Lyricist Sun Yi filed a lawsuit against the Li Ge Record Company (麗歌唱片公司). Sun lost the lawsuit, so the company owns the copyright of this song.
