= Hog Wild (album) =

Studio album by Hank Williams Jr.
- Released: January 24, 1995
- Studio: Mid Town Studios, Tone and Volume Studios, Treasure Isle Studios
- Genre: Country
- Length: 38:41
- Label: Curb Records
- Producer: Chuck Howard, Hank Williams Jr.

Hank Williams Jr. chronology
Tribute to My Father (1993)	Hog Wild (1995)	A.K.A. Wham Bam Sam (1996)

Hog Wild is an album by the American country music artist Hank Williams Jr. It was released on January 24, 1995 by Curb Records. Williams supported the album with a North American tour.

== Production ==
The album was produced by Chuck Howard and Williams. Williams wrote or cowrote six of the 10 songs.

== Critical reception ==
Professional ratings
Review scores
Source	Rating
AllMusic	2/5 stars
Calgary Herald	D
Entertainment Weekly	F
The Indianapolis Star	1.5/4 stars

Entertainment Weekly called the album "lame," noting that "Junior salutes the girls of Daytona Beach and makes pig calls on the title song." The Calgary Herald dismissed it as "two-bit rock 'n' roll."

The Ottawa Citizen wrote that "Williams's two biker tunes, 'Hog Wild' and 'Iron Horse', both have a spirited kind of energy." The Indianapolis Star concluded that "'Daytona Nights' and 'It's a Start' are sure to appeal to women who don't mind being bedded, then stalked."

== Track listing ==
All songs written by Hank Williams Jr., except where noted.

1. "Hog Wild" (Hank Williams Jr., Rick Arnold) – 3:31
2. "I Ain't Goin' Peacefully" – 3:02
3. "Between Heaven and Hell" (Tommy Barnes) – 3:22
4. "Iron Horse" – 3:43
5. "Daytona Nights" – 4:19
6. "Tobacco Road" (John D. Loudermilk) – 4:11
7. "It's a Start" (Danny Mayo, Bob Regan) – 2:59
8. "Greeted in Enid" – 2:46
9. "Eyes of Waylon" – 6:16
10. "Wild Thing" (Chip Taylor) – 7:35

== Personnel ==
- Rick Arnold – jew's harp
- Kenny Aronoff – drums
- Butch Baker – background vocals
- Greg Barnhill – background vocals
- Bruce Bouton – steel guitar
- Larry Franklin – fiddle
- Paul Franklin – steel guitar
- Ricky Lynn Gregg – electric guitar
- Tony Harrell – keyboards, organ, piano
- Mike Haynes – trumpet
- John Hobbs – keyboards, organ, piano
- Jim Horn – baritone saxophone
- Carl Jackson – background vocals
- John Jorgenson – electric guitar
- Mary Ann Kennedy – background vocals
- Jana King – background vocals
- Terry McMillan – harmonica, percussion
- Steve Nathan – keyboards, organ, piano
- Danny Parks – fiddle
- Charles Rose – trombone
- Billy Bob Shane – background vocals
- Hank Singer – fiddle
- Denis Solee – clarinet, tenor saxophone
- Michael Spriggs – acoustic guitar
- Hank Williams Jr. – acoustic guitar, lead vocals
- John Willis – electric guitar
- Glenn Worf – bass guitar
- Curtis Young – background vocals

== Chart performance ==
Chart (1995)	Peak position
U.S. Billboard Top Country Albums	14
U.S. Billboard 200	91
