= A.K.A. Wham Bam Sam =

Studio album by Hank Williams, Jr
- Released: April 4, 1996
- Recorded: ???
- Length: 34:20
- Label: Curb
- Producer: Chuck Howard

Hank Williams, Jr chronology
| 20 Hits Special Collection, Vol. 1 (1995) | A.K.A. Wham Bam Sam (1996) | Three Hanks: Men With Broken Hearts (1996) |

A.K.A. Wham Bam Sam is the forty-seventh studio album by American musician Hank Williams, Jr. This album was released on April 4, 1996, on the Curb Records label.

== Track listing ==
1. "Don Juan d'Bubba" – 2:55
2. "Houston, We Have a Problem" – 3:38
3. "It Makes a Good Story" – 3:19
4. "Maybe I'm the One Who's Crazy" – 3:24
5. "Honky Tonked All to Hell" – 3:00
6. "She Don't Do Nothing for Me" – 3:32
7. "Been There, Done That" – 2:57
8. "Let's Keep the Heart in Country" – 3:45
9. "You Won't Mind the Rain" – 4:20
10. "Wham, Bam, Sam" – 3:34

== Personnel ==
- Kenny Aronoff – drums
- Eddie Bayers – drums
- Chad Cromwell – drums
- Paul Franklin – steel guitar
- Jimmy Hall – harmonica
- Tony Harrell – keyboards
- John Hobbs – keyboards
- John Jorgenson – electric guitar
- Brent Mason – electric guitar
- Terry McMillan – harmonica
- Steve Nathan – keyboards
- Michael Spriggs – acoustic guitar
- Neil Thrasher – background vocals
- Hank Williams Jr. – lead vocals, background vocals
- John Willis – electric guitar
- Glenn Worf – bass guitar

== Chart performance ==
| Chart (1996) | Peak position |
|---|---|
| U.S. Billboard Top Country Albums | 40 |
