= Women I've Never Had =

Single by Hank Williams Jr.

from the album Whiskey Bent and Hell Bound
- B-side: "Tired of Being Johnny B. Good"
- Released: March 1980
- Genre: Country
- Length: 2:51
- Label: Elektra/Curb
- Songwriter(s): Hank Williams Jr.
- Producer(s): Jimmy Bowen

Hank Williams Jr. singles chronology
"Whiskey Bent and Hell Bound" (1979)	"Women I've Never Had" (1980)	"Kaw-Liga" (1980)

"Women I've Never Had" is a song written and recorded by American musician Hank Williams Jr. It was released in March 1980 as the second single from the album Whiskey Bent and Hell Bound. The song reached number 5 on the Billboard Hot Country Singles & Tracks chart.

== Chart performance ==
Chart (1980)	Peak position
US Hot Country Songs (Billboard)	5
Canadian RPM Country Tracks	9
