= Whiskey Bent and Hell Bound (song) =

Single by Hank Williams Jr.

from the album Whiskey Bent and Hell Bound
- B-side: ""O.D.'d in Denver"
- Released: September 24, 1979
- Recorded: June 25th, 1979
- Genre: Country
- Length: 3:09
- Label: Elektra/Curb
- Songwriter(s): Hank Williams Jr.
- Producer(s): Jimmy Bowen

Hank Williams Jr. singles chronology
"Family Tradition" (1979)	"Whiskey Bent and Hell Bound" (1979)	"Women I've Never Had" (1980)

"Whiskey Bent and Hell Bound" is a song written and recorded by American musician Hank Williams Jr. It was released in September 1979 as the first single and title track from his album of the same name. It peaked at number 2 on the U.S. Billboard Hot Country Singles chart and reached number-one on the Canadian RPM Country Tracks chart.

== Background ==
Hank wrote the song while hanging out with the Allman Brothers. Hank came up with the opening lines after Dickey Betts asked him how he writes country songs, Hank replied with "Well I got a good woman at home." the rest was allegedly written in 10 minutes

== Cover versions ==
Country music singer Tim McGraw covered the song for the television special CMT Giants: Hank Williams Jr.

== Chart performance ==
Chart (1979)	Peak position
US Hot Country Songs (Billboard)	2
Canadian RPM Country Tracks	1

== Certifications ==
Region	Certification	Certified units/sales
United States (RIAA)	Platinum	1,000,000^{‡}
^{‡} Sales+streaming figures based on certification alone.
