= Family Tradition (Hank Williams Jr. song) =

Single by Hank Williams, Jr.

Single by Hank Williams Jr.

from the album Family Tradition
- B-side: "Paying on Time"
- Released: May 28, 1979
- Recorded: 1978
- Genre: Country
- Length: 4:00
- Label: Elektra/Curb
- Songwriter: Hank Williams Jr.
- Producer: Jimmy Bowen

Hank Williams Jr. singles chronology
"To Love Somebody" (1979)	"Family Tradition" (1979)	"Whiskey Bent and Hell Bound" (1979)

"Family Tradition" is a song written and recorded by American musician Hank Williams Jr. It was released in May 1979 as the fourth and final single and title track from his album of the same name. It peaked at No. 4, and is one of his most popular songs. It has sold 909,000 digital copies as of April 2016.

== Content ==
The song is a Williams' statement of rebellion, not only in his lifestyle and living out the lyrics of his songs, but of his musical identity and direction.

With the latter point, the lyrics state Williams' unapologetic desire to forge his own style, particularly in response to criticism for his change from countrypolitan and covers of his father's songs. At the same time proclaiming how proud and honored he is to be part of his father's musical legacy, the younger Williams makes clear that his musical style – southern rock fused with honky tonk – is very different from the blues-oriented honky-tonk popular during Williams' lifetime.

Taking off on the point of his father, the younger Williams notes that the hard-living lifestyle is a "family tradition," referring to the alcohol and drug use that became associated with his personal life.

Charlie Daniels performed the fiddle-led bridge between the second and third verses.

When played in concert, at parties, or sung at karaoke, "Family Tradition" frequently becomes a call-and-response song during the chorus.

== Critical reception ==
In 2024, Rolling Stone ranked the song at #83 on its 200 Greatest Country Songs of All Time ranking.

== Political usage ==
For the 2008 US presidential campaign, Williams wrote a version of the song called "McCain-Palin Tradition", supporting John McCain and including topical references such as the 2008 bank bailout, Sarah Palin's record in Alaska, and an indirect reference to the claim that their opponent, Barack Obama, was linked to "terrorist friends".

== Chart performance ==
Chart (1979)	Peak position
US Hot Country Songs (Billboard)	4
US Bubbling Under Hot 100 (Billboard)	4
Canadian RPM Country Tracks	16

== Certifications ==
Region	Certification	Certified units/sales
United States (RIAA)	3× Platinum	3,000,000^{‡}
^{‡} Sales+streaming figures based on certification alone.
