= Gangtai =

Music genre from Hong Kong and Taiwan

Gangtai (Chinese: 港臺; pinyin: Gǎng Tái) are the C-pop artists and musical style from Hong Kong or Taiwan. The term is synonymous with post-1960 Cantopop or post-1970 Mandopop, a sweet, love type melody found distinctly in C-pop and not any other genre of Chinese folk, rock or traditional music.

== See also ==
- Shidaiqu
