= Hank Williams Jr. discography =

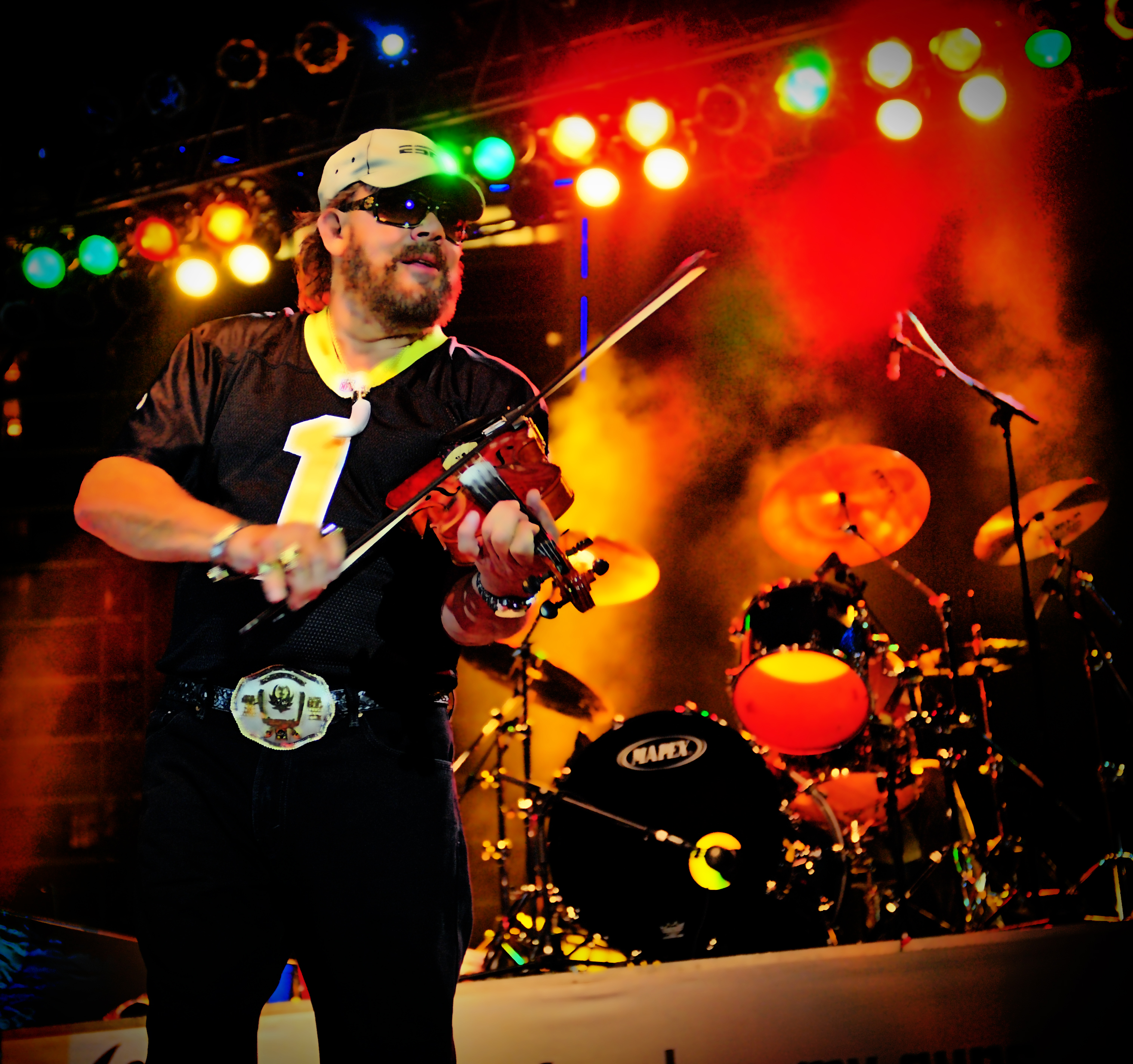
- Hank Williams Jr. performing in Atmore, Alabama
- Studio albums: 54
- Live albums: 2
- Compilation albums: 25
- Singles: 109
- Music videos: 25
- No. 1 Singles (USA): 10
- No.1 Single (Overall): 11

The discography of all albums and singles released by Hank Williams Jr. consists of 54 studio albums and 25 compilation albums. He has released 109 singles and 24 music videos. Eleven of his singles have reached Number One in either the United States or Canada.

== Studio albums ==
=== 1960s ===
Title	Details	Peak chart positions		Certifications (sales thresholds)
Title	Details	US Country	US	Certifications (sales thresholds)
Hank Williams Jr. Sings the Songs of Hank Williams	Release date: 1964; Label: MGM Records	12	—	
Your Cheatin' Heart	Release date: October 1964; Label: MGM Records	5	16	US: Gold
Connie Francis and Hank Williams Jr. Sing Great Country Favorites	Release date: November 1964; Label: MGM Records	—	—	
Father & Son	Release date: 1965; Label: MGM Records	8	139	
Ballads of the Hills and Plains	Release date: 1965; Label: MGM Records	—	—	
Blues My Name	Release date: 1966; Label: MGM Records	—	—	
Country Shadows	Release date: 1966; Label: MGM Records	33	—	
Hank Williams/Hank Williams Jr. Again	Release date: 1966; Label: MGM Records	38	—	
My Own Way	Release date: 1967; Label: MGM Records	42	—	
A Time to Sing	Release date: 1968; Label: MGM Records	12	189	
Luke the Drifter Jr.	Release date: 1969; Label: MGM Records	20	—	
Songs My Father Left Me	Release date: February 1969; Label: MGM Records	1	164	
Luke the Drifter Jr. – Vol. 2	Release date: April 1969; Label: MGM Records	—	—	
Sunday Morning	Release date: October 1969; Label: MGM Records	—	—	
"—" denotes releases that did not chart

=== 1970s ===
Title	Details	Peak chart positions			Certifications (sales thresholds)
Title	Details	US Country	US	CAN Country	Certifications (sales thresholds)
Hank Williams Jr. Singing My Songs (Johnny Cash)	Release date: 1970; Label: MGM Records	32	—	—	
Removing the Shadow	Release date: 1970; Label: MGM Records	21	—	—	
All for the Love of Sunshine	Release date: 1971; Label: MGM Records	10	—	—	
I've Got a Right to Cry	Release date: 1971; Label: MGM Records	23	—	—	
Eleven Roses	Release date: 1972; Label: MGM Records	6	—	—	
Send Me Lovin' and a Whole Lotta Loving	Release date: 1972; Label: MGM Records	35	—	—	
The Legend of Hank Williams in Song and Story	Release date: 1973; Label: MGM Records	17	—	—	
After You, Pride's Not Hard to Swallow	Release date: March 1973; Label: MGM Records	20	—	—	
The Last Love Song	Release date: 1974; Label: MGM Records	17	—	—	
Living Proof	Release date: 1974; Label: MGM Records	31	—	—	
Insights into Hank Williams in Song and Story	Release date: 1974; Label: MGM Records	37	—	—	
Bocephus	Release date: 1975; Label: MGM Records	41	—	—	
Hank Williams Jr. and Friends	Release date: December 1975; Label: MGM Records; Mercury Nashville	17	—	—	
One Night Stands	Release date: 1977; Label: Elektra Records/Curb	33	—	—	
The New South	Release date: 1977; Label: Elektra Records/Curb	36	—	—	
Family Tradition	Release date: April 17, 1979; Label: Elektra Records/Curb	3	201	—	US: Gold
Whiskey Bent and Hell Bound	Release date: November 1979; Label: Elektra Records/Curb	5	—	7	US: Platinum
"—" denotes releases that did not chart

=== 1980s ===
Title	Details	Peak chart positions			Certifications (sales thresholds)
Title	Details	US Country	US	CAN Country	Certifications (sales thresholds)
Habits Old and New	Release date: June 1980; Label: Elektra Records/Curb	4	154	7	US: Gold
Rowdy	Release date: January 1981; Label: Elektra Records/Curb	2	82	20	US: Gold
The Pressure Is On	Release date: August 1981; Label: Elektra Records/Curb	5	76	—	US: Platinum
High Notes	Release date: April 1982; Label: Elektra Records/Curb	3	123	—	US: Gold
Strong Stuff	Release date: February 1983; Label: Elektra Records/Curb	7	64	—	US: Gold
Man of Steel	Release date: September 1983; Label: Warner Bros. Records/Curb	3	116	—	US: Gold
Major Moves	Release date: May 1984; Label: Warner Bros. Records/Curb	1	100	20	US: Platinum
Five-O	Release date: May 1985; Label: Warner Bros. Records/Curb	1	72	—	US: Gold
Montana Cafe	Release date: July 1986; Label: Warner Bros. Records/Curb	1	93	—	US: Gold
Born to Boogie	Release date: July 1987; Label: Warner Bros. Records/Curb	1	28	—	US: Platinum
Wild Streak	Release date: June 21, 1988; Label: Warner Bros. Records/Curb	1	55	—	US: Gold
"—" denotes releases that did not chart

=== 1990s ===
Title	Details	Peak chart positions			Certifications (sales thresholds)
Title	Details	US Country	US	CAN Country	Certifications (sales thresholds)
Lone Wolf	Release date: January 1990; Label: Warner Bros. Records/Curb	2	71	—	US: Gold
Pure Hank	Release date: April 1991; Label: Warner Bros. Records/Curb	8	50	—	US: Gold
Maverick	Release date: February 18, 1992; Label: Warner Bros. Records/Curb	7	55	22	US: Gold
Out of Left Field	Release date: March 9, 1993; Label: Curb Records/Capricorn	25	121	—	
Hog Wild	Release date: January 24, 1995; Label: MCG/Curb Records	14	92	—	
A.K.A. Wham Bam Sam	Release date: April 4, 1996; Label: MCG/Curb Records	40	—	—	
Three Hanks: Men with Broken Hearts	Release date: September 17, 1996; Label: Curb Records	29	167	—	
Stormy	Release date: August 31, 1999; Label: Curb Records	21	162	—	
"—" denotes releases that did not chart

=== 2000s–2020s ===
Title	Details	Peak chart positions			Sales
Title	Details	US Country	US	CAN	Sales
The Almeria Club Recordings	Release date: January 8, 2002; Label: Curb	9	112	—	
I'm One of You	Release date: November 18, 2003; Label: Curb	24	166	—	
127 Rose Avenue	Release date: June 16, 2009; Label: Curb	7	19	—	
Old School, New Rules	Release date: July 10, 2012; Label: Bocephus/WB	4	12	—	US: 100,000
It's About Time	Release date: January 15, 2016; Label: Nash Icon	2	15	84	
Rich White Honky Blues	Release date: June 16, 2022; Label: Easy Eye Sound	22	183	—	
"—" denotes releases that did not chart

== Compilation albums ==
=== 1960s–1970s ===
Title	Details	Peak positions
Title	Details	US Country
The Best of Hank Williams Jr.	Release date: 1968; Label: MGM Records	33
Greatest Hits	Release date: 1969; Label: MGM Records	7
Hank Williams Jr.'s Greatest Hits Vol. II	Release date: 1972; Label: MGM Records	15
Fourteen Greatest Hits	Release date: 1976; Label: MGM Records	29

=== 1980s–1990s ===
Title	Details	Peak chart positions			Certifications (sales thresholds)
Title	Details	US Country	US	CAN Country	Certifications (sales thresholds)
Hank Williams Jr.'s Greatest Hits	Release date: September 1982; Label: Elektra Records/Curb	5	135	—	US: 5× Platinum
Hank Williams Jr.'s Greatest Hits, Vol. 2	Release date: 1985; Label: Warner Bros. Records/Curb	1	183	—	US: Platinum
Greatest Hits, Vol 3	Release date: February 1989; Label: Warner Bros. Records/Curb	1	61	2	US: Platinum
America (The Way I See It)	Release date: October 1990; Label: Warner Bros. Records/Curb	11	116	—	US: Gold
The Best of Hank & Hank	Release date: 1992; Label: Curb Records	44	179	26	
Living Proof: The MGM Recordings 1963–1975	Release date: 1992; Label: MGM Records	—	—	—	
Those Tear Jerking Songs	Release date: March 31, 1992; Label: PolyGram Special Markets	—	—	—	
The Best of Hank Williams, Jr. Volume One: Roots and Branches	Release date: August 4, 1992; Label: MGM Records	—	—	—	
Hank Williams, Jr.'s Greatest Hits	Release date: September 21, 1993; Label: Curb Records	55	101	—	
Tribute to My Father	Release date: September 21, 1993; Label: Curb Records	—	—	—	
20 Hits: Special Collection, Vol. 1	Release date: November 7, 1995; Label: Curb Records	—	—	—	
Early Years, Vol. 1	Release date: October 6, 1998; Label: Curb Records	—	—	—	
Early Years, Vol. 2	Release date: October 6, 1998; Label: Curb Records	—	—	—	
The Complete Hank Williams Jr.	Release date: April 6, 1999; Label: Curb Records	—	—	—	
"—" denotes releases that did not chart

=== 2000s–2010s ===
Title	Details	Peak chart positions		Certifications (sales thresholds)
Title	Details	US Country	US	Certifications (sales thresholds)
The Bocephus Box	Release date: August 29, 2000; Label: Curb Records	—	—	
That's How They Do It in Dixie: The Essential Collection	Release date: June 26, 2006; Label: Curb Records	3	16	US: Gold
Hank Jr. Collector's Edition	Release date: May 6, 2008; Label: Curb Records	55	—	
Hank Jr. Sings Hank Sr.	Release date: 2009; Label: Curb Records	—	—	
All My Rowdy Friends: Best of Hank Jr.	Release date: March 27, 2012; Label: Curb Records	23	153	
35 Biggest Hits	Release date: June 16, 2015; Label: Curb Records	16	121	
A Country Boy Can Survive (4-CD Box Set)	Release date: October 21, 2016; Label: Curb Records	50	—	
All My Rowdy Friends Are Coming Over: Great Tailgating Songs	Release date: September 1, 2017; Label: Curb Records	—	—	US: 26,500
The Biggest Hits of Hank Williams Jr.	Release date: June 15, 2018; Label: Curb Records	—	—	
"—" denotes releases that did not chart

== Live albums ==
Title	Details	Peak chart positions		Certifications (sales thresholds)
Title	Details	US Country	US	Certifications (sales thresholds)
Live at Cobo Hall	Release date: July 1969; Label: MGM Records	3	187	
Hank Live	Release date: January 1987; Label: Warner Bros. Records/Curb	1	71	US: Platinum

== Singles ==
=== 1960s ===
Year	Single	Peak chart positions			Album
Year	Single	US Country	US	CAN Country	Album
1964	"Long Gone Lonesome Blues"	5	67	—	Sings the Songs of Hank Williams
1964	"Guess What, That's Right, She's Gone"	42	—	—	Country Shadows
1964	"Endless Sleep"	46	90	—	Country Shadows
1966	"Standing in the Shadows"	5	—	—	Country Shadows
1966	"I Can't Take It No Longer"	43	—	—	My Own Way
1967	"I'm In No Condition"	60	—	—	My Own Way
1967	"Nobody's Child"	46	—	—	My Own Way
1968	"I Wouldn't Change a Thing About You (But Your Name)"	31	—	—	My Songs
1968	"The Old Ryman"	51	—	—	Non-album single
1968	"It's All Over but the Crying"	3	—	3	A Time to Sing
1968	"I Was With Red Foley (The Night He Passed Away)"	39	—	—	Luke the Drifter Jr.
1969	"Custody"	14	—	—	Luke the Drifter Jr. – Vol. 2
1969	"A Baby Again"	16	—	21	Greatest Hits (1969)
1969	"Cajun Baby"	3	— (Note: "Cajun Baby" did not enter the Billboard Hot 100, but peaked at number seven on the Bubbling Under Hot 100 Singles chart.)	—	Songs My Father Left Me
1969	"Be Careful of Stones That You Throw"	37	—	—	Luke the Drifter Jr. – Vol. 2
1969	"I'd Rather Be Gone"	4	—	6	Greatest Hits (1969)
1969	"Something to Think About"	36	—	14	Luke the Drifter Jr. – Vol. 3
"—" denotes releases that did not chart

=== 1970s ===
Year	Single	Peak chart positions			Certifications	Album
Year	Single	US Country	US	CAN Country	Certifications	Album
1970	"I Walked Out on Heaven"	12	—	33		Greatest Hits Volume 2
1970	"It Don't Take but One Mistake"	36	—	—		Luke the Drifter Jr. – Vol. 3
1970	"Removing the Shadow" (with Lois Johnson)	23	—	27		Removing the Shadow
1970	"All for the Love of Sunshine" (with the Mike Curb Congregation)	1	—	1		All for the Love of Sunshine
1970	"So Sad (To Watch Good Love Go Bad)" (with Lois Johnson)	12	—	10		Removing the Shadow
1970	"Rainin' in My Heart" (with the Mike Curb Congregation)	3	— (Note: "Rainin' in My Heart" did not enter the Billboard Hot 100, but peaked at number eight on the Bubbling Under Hot 100 Singles chart.)	2		All for the Love of Sunshine
1971	"I've Got a Right to Cry"	6	— (Note: "I've Got a Right to Cry" did not enter the Billboard Hot 100, but peaked at number 15 on the Bubbling Under Hot 100 Singles chart.)	17		I've Got a Right to Cry / They All Used to Belong to Me
1971	"After All They All Used to Belong to Me"	18	—	21		I've Got a Right to Cry / They All Used to Belong to Me
1971	"Ain't That a Shame" (with the Mike Curb Congregation)	7	—	16		Sweet Dreams
1972	"Send Me Some Lovin'" (with Lois Johnson)	14	—	31		Send Me Some Lovin'
1972	"Eleven Roses"	1	—	1		Eleven Roses
1972	"Pride's Not Hard to Swallow"	3	—	2		After You / Pride's Not Hard to Swallow
1972	"Whole Lotta Loving" (with Lois Johnson)	22	—	25		Send Me Some Lovin'
1973	"After You"	23	—	10		After You / Pride's Not Hard to Swallow
1973	"Hank"	12	—	14		The Legend of Hank Williams in Song and Story
1973	"The Last Love Song"	4	—	4		The Last Love Song
1974	"Rainy Night in Georgia"	13	—	21		The Last Love Song
1974	"I'll Think of Something"	7	—	2		Living Proof
1974	"Angels Are Hard to Find"	19	—	37		Living Proof
1975	"Where He's Going, I've Already Been" / "The Kind of Woman I Got" (Note: Single was released as a double A-side.)	26	—	36		Bocephus
1975	"The Same Old Story"	29	—	40		Bocephus
1975	"Stoned at the Jukebox"	19	—	17		Hank Williams Jr. and Friends
1976	"Living Proof"	38	—	—		Hank Williams Jr. and Friends
1977	"Mobile Boogie"	27	—	9		One Night Stand
1977	"I'm Not Responsible" / "(Honey, Won't You) Call Me" (Note: Single was released as a double A-side.)	59	—	—		One Night Stand
1977	"One Night Stands"	47	—	—		One Night Stand
1977	"Feelin' Better"	38	—	40		The New South
1978	"You Love the Thunder"	76	—	—		Non-album single
1978	"I Fought the Law"	15	—	6		Family Tradition
1978	"Old Flame, New Fire"	54	—	—		Family Tradition
1979	"To Love Somebody"	49	—	—		Family Tradition
1979	"Family Tradition"	4	— (Note: "Family Tradition" did not enter the Billboard Hot 100, but peaked at number four on the Bubbling Under Hot 100 Singles chart.)	16	US: 3× Platinum	Family Tradition
1979	"Whiskey Bent and Hell Bound"	2	—	1	US: Platinum	Whiskey Bent and Hell Bound
"—" denotes releases that did not chart

=== 1980s ===
Year	Single	Peak chart positions		Certifications	Album
Year	Single	US Country	CAN Country	Certifications	Album
1980	"Women I've Never Had"	5	9		Whiskey Bent and Hell Bound
1980	"Kaw-Liga"	12	8		Habits, Old and New
1980	"Old Habits"	6	58		Habits, Old and New
1981	"Texas Women"	1	22		Rowdy
1981	"Dixie on My Mind"	1	41	US: Gold	Rowdy
1981	"All My Rowdy Friends (Have Settled Down)"	1	1	US: Platinum	The Pressure Is On
1982	"A Country Boy Can Survive"	2	2	US: 5× Platinum	The Pressure Is On
1982	"Honky Tonkin'"	1	6		High Notes
1982	"The American Dream" / "If Heaven Ain't a Lot Like Dixie" (from High Notes) (Note: Single was released as a double A-side.)	5	—	US: Gold	Greatest Hits (1982)
1983	"Gonna Go Huntin' Tonight"	4	4		Strong Stuff
1983	"Leave Them Boys Alone" (with Waylon Jennings and Ernest Tubb)	6	7		Strong Stuff
1983	"Queen of My Heart"	5	6		Man of Steel
1984	"Man of Steel"	3	4		Man of Steel
1984	"Attitude Adjustment"	5	7		Major Moves
1984	"All My Rowdy Friends Are Coming Over Tonight"	10	6	US: Gold	Major Moves
1985	"Major Moves"	10	14		Major Moves
1985	"I'm for Love"	1	5		Five-O
1985	"This Ain't Dallas"	4	22		Five-O
1986	"Ain't Misbehavin'"	1	1		Five-O
1986	"Country State of Mind"	2	4	US: Gold	Montana Cafe
1986	"Mind Your Own Business" (with Reba McEntire, Willie Nelson, Tom Petty, and Reverend Ike)	1	1		Montana Cafe
1987	"When Something Is Good (Why Does It Change)"	31	—		Montana Cafe
1987	"Born to Boogie"	1	1		Born to Boogie
1987	"Heaven Can't Be Found"	4	13		Born to Boogie
1988	"Young Country"	2	2		Born to Boogie
1988	"If the South Woulda Won"	8	22		Wild Streak
1988	"Early in the Morning and Late at Night"	14	14		Wild Streak
1989	"There's a Tear in My Beer" (with Hank Williams)	7	9		Greatest Hits, Vol. 3
1989	"Finders Are Keepers"	6	5		Greatest Hits, Vol. 3
"—" denotes releases that did not chart

=== 1990s ===
Year	Single	Peak chart positions		Album
Year	Single	US Country	CAN Country	Album
1990	"Ain't Nobody's Business"	15	16	Lone Wolf
1990	"Good Friends, Good Whiskey, Good Lovin'"	10	16	Lone Wolf
1990	"Man to Man"	62	52	Lone Wolf
1990	"Don't Give Us a Reason"	27	—	America (The Way I See It)
1990	"All My Rowdy Friends Are Coming Over for Monday Night Football" (with The Bama Band)	—	—	America (The Way I See It)
1991	"I Mean I Love You"	39	42	Lone Wolf
1991	"If It Will, It Will"	26	24	Pure Hank
1991	"Angels Are Hard to Find" (re-recording)	59	—	Pure Hank
1992	"Hotel Whiskey" (with Clint Black; uncredited)	54	82	Maverick
1992	"Come On Over to the Country"	55	—	Maverick
1992	"Lyin' Jukebox"	—	—	Maverick
1993	"Everything Comes Down to Money and Love"	62	—	Out of Left Field
1993	"Both Sides of Goodbye"	—	—	Out of Left Field
1993	"Diamond Mine"	—	—	Out of Left Field
1994	"I Ain't Goin' Peacefully"	62	—	Hog Wild
1995	"Hog Wild"	74	—	Hog Wild
1995	"Wild Thing"	—	—	Hog Wild
1995	"Daytona Nights"	—	—	Hog Wild
1996	"Houston, We Have a Problem"	—	—	A.K.A. Wham Bam Sam
1996	"Don Juan d'Bubba"	—	—	A.K.A. Wham Bam Sam
1996	"Move It On Over" (with Hank Williams and Hank Williams III)	—	—	Three Hanks: Men with Broken Hearts
"—" denotes releases that did not chart

=== 2000s and 2010s ===
Year	Single	Peak chart positions		Album
Year	Single	US Country	US	Album
2000	"Naked Women and Beer" (with Kid Rock)	—	—	Stormy
2001	"America Will Survive"	45	—	The Almeria Club Recordings
2002	"The 'F' Word"	—	—	The Almeria Club Recordings
2002	"Outdoor Lovin' Man"	60	—	The Almeria Club Recordings
2003	"I'm One of You"	39	—	I'm One of You
2004	"Why Can't We All Just Get a Longneck?"	36	—	I'm One of You
2004	"Devil in the Bottle"	59	—	I'm One of You
2006	"That's How They Do It in Dixie" (with Big & Rich, Gretchen Wilson, and Van Zant)	35	—	That's How They Do It in Dixie: The Essential Collection
2007	"A Country Boy Can Survive" (re-release)	47	—	That's How They Do It in Dixie: The Essential Collection
2009	"Red White & Pink-Slip Blues"	43	—	127 Rose Avenue
2009	"Farm Song"	—	—	127 Rose Avenue
2009	"All the Roads"	—	—	127 Rose Avenue
2011	"Keep the Change"	— (Note: "Keep the Change" did not enter the Billboard Hot Country Songs chart, but peaked at number 14 on the Country Digital Song Sales chart.)	— (Note: "Keep the Change" did not enter the Billboard Hot 100, but peaked at number 11 on the Bubbling Under Hot 100 Singles chart.)	Old School New Rules
2012	"That Ain't Good"	—	—	Old School New Rules
2013	"I Think I'll Just Stay Here and Drink" (with Merle Haggard)	—	—	Old School New Rules
2013	"Angels Are Hard to Find"	—	—	Gravity (soundtrack)
2015	"Are You Ready for the Country?" (with Eric Church)	— (Note: "Are You Ready for the Country?" did not enter the Billboard Hot Country Songs chart, but peaked at number 46 on Country Airplay.)	—	It's About Time
2016	"The Party's On"	—	—	It's About Time
2018	"Take a Knee, Take a Hike"	—	—	Non-album single
"—" denotes releases that did not chart

=== As a featured artist ===
Year	Single	Peak chart positions			Certifications	Album
Year	Single	US Country	US	CAN Country	Certifications	Album
1983	"The Conversation" (Waylon Jennings with Hank Williams Jr.)	15	—	12	US: Gold	Waylon and Company
1985	"Two Old Cats Like Us" (Ray Charles with Hank Williams Jr.)	14	—	18		Friendship
1988	"Cajun Baby" (Doug Kershaw with Hank Williams Jr.)	52	—	—		Hot Diggidy Doug
1988	"That Old Wheel" (Johnny Cash with Hank Williams Jr.)	21	—	—		Water from the Wells of Home
1999	"A Country Boy Can Survive (Y2K version)" (Chad Brock with George Jones and Hank Williams Jr.)	30	75	66		Yes!
2008	"Bartender Song (Sittin' at a Bar)" (Rehab featuring Hank Williams Jr.)	60	—	—		Graffiti the World
2013	"Redneck Paradise (Remix)" (Kid Rock featuring Hank Williams Jr.)	—	—	—		Non-album single
"—" denotes releases that did not chart

=== Other charted and certified songs ===
Year	Single	Peak chart positions			Certifications	Album
Year	Single	US Country	US	CAN	Certifications	Album
1979	"Outlaw Women"	—	—	—	US: Gold	Whiskey Bent and Hell Bound
1980	"Dinosaur"	—	—	—	US: Platinum	Habits, Old and New
1980	"The Blues Man"	—	—	—	US: Gold	Habits, Old and New
1981	"Weatherman"	—	—	—	US: Gold	The Pressure Is On
1982	"If Heaven Ain't a Lot Like Dixie"	—	—	—	US: Gold	High Notes
2024	"Finer Things" (with Post Malone)	17	42	39		F-1 Trillion
"—" denotes releases that did not chart

== Music videos ==
Year	Video	Director
1983	"Queen of My Heart"	
1983	"The Conversation" (with Waylon Jennings)	David Hogan
1984	"All My Rowdy Friends Are Coming Over Tonight"	John Goodhue
1987	"My Name Is Bocephus"	Fisher & Preachman
1987	"Young Country"	Bill Fishman
1989	"There's a Tear in My Beer" (with Hank Williams)	Ethan Russell
1991	"If It Will, It Will" (with Little Richard)	Ethan Russell
1991	"Fax Me a Beer"	
1991	"Hotel Whiskey" (with Clint Black)	Jack Cole
1992	"Come on Over to the Country"	John Lloyd Miller
1992	"Everything Comes Down to Money and Love"	Jim May
1993	"Diamond Mine"	Joe Gutt/Marc Ball
1994	"I Ain't Goin' Peacefully"	Martin Kahan
1995	"Hog Wild"	Martin Kahan
1996	"Don Juan d'Bubba"	Michael Salomon
2000	"Naked Women and Beer" (with Kid Rock)	Bill Fishman
2001	"America Will Survive"	
2004	"Why Can't We All Just Get a Long Neck?"	Deaton Flanigen
2006	"That's How They Do It in Dixie" (with Big & Rich, Gretchen Wilson, and Van Zant)	Deaton Flanigen
2007	"A Country Boy Can Survive (25th Anniversary Remix)"	Deaton Flanigen
2008	"Bartender Song" (Nashville Country Version) (with Rehab)	Frank Borin
2009	"Red White & Pink-Slip Blues"	Deaton Flanigen
2012	"That Ain't Good"	Jim Wright
2013	"Redneck Paradise (Remix)" (with Kid Rock)	Eric Welch
2015	"Are You Ready for the Country?" (with Eric Church)	Peter Zavadil
