= The Bocephus Box =

Box set by Hank Williams, Jr.
- Released: 1992 (re-released August 29, 2000)
- Recorded: 1979–1999
- Genre: country
- Length: 226:07
- Label: Curb
- Producer: Various

Hank Williams, Jr. chronology
Stormy (1999)	The Bocephus Box (1992)	The Almeria Club Recordings (2002)

Professional ratings
Review scores
Source	Rating
Allmusic	5/5 stars

The Bocephus Box is a box set of songs recorded by country music artist Hank Williams, Jr. Produced by Jimmy Guterman, it was originally released in 1992 by Capricorn Records, and re-released in 2000 by Curb Records, with a slightly different track list.

== Track listing (2000 reissue) ==
=== Disc One ===
1. "A Country Boy Can Survive (Y2K Version)" (Williams, Jr.) (3:58) - featuring Chad Brock and George Jones
2. "Family Tradition" (Williams, Jr.) (4:00)
3. "To Love Somebody" (Barry Gibb, Robin Gibb) (3:09)
4. "Old Flame, New Fire" (Oskar Solomon) (2:38)
5. "Only Daddy That'll Walk the Line" (Jimmy Bryant) (3:18)
6. "I've Got Rights" (Williams, Jr.) (3:36)
7. "I Just Ain't Been Able" (Williams, Jr.) (2:37)
8. "Whiskey Bent and Hell Bound" (Williams, Jr.) (3:11)
9. "Outlaw Women" (Williams, Jr.) (3:02)
10. "(I Don't Have) Anymore Love Songs" (Williams, Jr.) (2:25)
11. "O.D.'d in Denver" (Williams, Jr.) (2:41)
12. "Come and Go Blues" (Gregg Allman) (4:05)
13. "The Conversation" (Ritchie Albright, Waylon Jennings, Williams, Jr.) (3:54) - duet with Waylon Jennings
14. "Old Habits" (Williams, Jr.) (3:05)
15. "Kaw-Liga" (Fred Rose, Hank Williams) (4:24)
16. "If You Don't Like Hank Williams" (Kris Kristofferson) (2:53)
17. "Dixie on My Mind" (Williams, Jr.) (2:37)
18. "Texas Women" (Williams, Jr.) (2:29)
19. "Ramblin' Man" (Williams) (3:37)
20. "Waitin' on the Tables to Turn" (Wayne Kemp, Mack Vickery) (2:40)
21. "A Country Boy Can Survive" (Williams, Jr.) (4:17)
22. "Born to Boogie" (Williams, Jr.) (2:45)
23. "Honky Tonk Women" (Jagger/Richards) (3:37)

=== Disc Two ===
1. "All My Rowdy Friends (Have Settled Down)" (Williams, Jr.) (4:01)
2. "I've Been Down" (Bunky Keel, Tony Stampley, Williams, Jr.) (3:42)
3. "La Grange" (Billy Gibbons, Dusty Hill, Frank Beard) (5:22)
4. "Leave Them Boys Alone" (Dean Dillon, Gary Stewart, Tanya Tucker, Williams, Jr.) (3:35)
5. "Blue Jean Blues" (Gibbons, Hill, Beard) (4:06)
6. "Midnight Rider" (Robert Payne, Allman) (2:49)
7. "Now I Know How George Feels" (Williams, Jr.) (2:48)
8. "All My Rowdy Friends Are Coming Over Tonight" (Williams, Jr.) (2:58)
9. "Major Moves" (Williams, Jr.) (3:34)
10. "Ain't Misbehavin'" (Fats Waller, Harry Brooks, Andy Razaf) (4:35)
11. "Lawyers, Guns and Money (Warren Zevon) (3:13)
12. "This Ain't Dallas" (Williams, Jr.) (2:45)
13. "Two Old Cats Like Us" (Troy Seals) (2:36) - featuring Ray Charles
14. "Country State of Mind" (Roger Alan Wade, Williams, Jr.) (4:01)
15. "Mind Your Own Business" (Williams) (2:29) - featuring Reba McEntire, Tom Petty, Willie Nelson and Reverend Ike
16. "Secret Agent Man" (Steve Barri, P.F. Sloan) (2:47)
17. "Wild Dogs" (Jonnie Barnett, Mike Lawler) (4:07)
18. "My Name Is Bocephus" (Williams, Jr.) (3:52)
19. "Workin' for MCA" (Ed King, Ronnie Van Zant) (1:43)
20. "I Really Like Girls"/"Rock and Roll Music" (George Thorogood, Chuck Berry) (4:05)
21. "The House of the Rising Sun" (Traditional) (3:21)
22. "The Blues Man" (Williams, Jr.) (4:18)

=== Disc Three ===
1. "Keep Your Hands to Yourself" (Dan Baird) (2:36)
2. "Walk This Way" (Steven Tyler, Joe Perry) (3:48)
3. "Heaven Can't Be Found" (Williams, Jr.) (3:13)
4. "Thanks a Lot" (Eddie Miller, Don Sessions) (2:54)
5. "All My Rowdy Friends (Have Settled Down) [Live Version]" (2:32)
6. "A Country Boy Can Survive [Live Version]" (7:18)
7. "You're Gonna Be a Sorry Man" (Al Anderson) (3:53)
8. "Tuesday's Gone (Allen Collins, Gary Rossington, Van Zant) (5:46)
9. "Mannish Boy (Bo Diddley, Muddy Waters, Mel London) (5:57)
10. "Finders Are Keepers" (Williams, Jr.) (3:01)
11. "There's a Tear in My Beer" (Williams) (2:52) - duet with Hank Williams
12. "Big Mamou" (Link Davis) (4:50)
13. "Man to Man" (Tommy Barnes, Williams, Jr.) (2:56)
14. "Stoned at the Jukebox" (Williams, Jr.) (2:59)
15. "T'ain't Nobody's Bizness" (Porter Grainger, Everett Robbins) (2:42)
16. "Lone Wolf" (Williams, Jr.) (3:52)
17. "If It Will It Will" (Williams, Jr.) (3:21)
18. "Hotel Whiskey" (Williams, Jr.) (3:48) - duet with Clint Black
19. "Low Down Blues" (Williams) (2:35)
20. "Naked Women and Beer" (Williams, Jr.) (3:29)
