= The Best of Hank Williams Jr. Volume One: Roots and Branches =

The Best of Hank Williams Jr. Volume One: Roots And Branches

Greatest hits album by Hank Williams Jr.
- Released: August 4, 1992
- Genre: Country
- Length: 57:56
- Label: Mercury Records
- Producer: Gregg Geller; Bill Levenson

Hank Williams Jr. chronology
Maverick (1992)	The Best of Hank Williams Jr. Volume One: Roots And Branches (1992)	The Best of Hank and Hank (1992)

Professional ratings
Review scores
Source	Rating
AllMusic	4.5/5 stars

The Best of Hank Williams Jr. Volume One is a compilation album by country artist Hank Williams Jr. It was released in 1992 by Mercury Records.

== Track listing ==
1. "Standing in the Shadows" (Williams) – 3:06
2. "Long Gone Lonesome Blues" (Hank Williams) – 2:36
3. "Cajun Baby" (Hank Williams, Williams) – 2:38
4. "Rock in My Shoe" (Williams) – 2:10
5. "It's All Over But The Crying" (Williams) – 2:35
6. "Nobody's Child" (Foree, Coben) – 2:48
7. "I Was with Red Foley" (Williams) – 2:48
8. "I Walked Out On Heaven" (Howard) – 2:31
9. "I'd Rather Be Gone" (Merle Haggard) – 2:40
10. "Eleven Roses" (McCall, Morris) – 2:40
11. "Cold Cold Ground" (Williams) – 2:29
12. "Hank" (Wayne) – 2:41
13. "Free Born Man" (Allison, Lindsay) – 2:51
14. "The Kind of Woman I Got" (Walls) – 3:01
15. "There's a Devil in the Bottle" (David) – 2:42
16. "Stoned at the Jukebox" (Williams) – 2:44
17. "Living Proof" (Williams) – 3:36
18. "Long Time Gone" (Betts) – 3:08
19. "Losing You" (Caldwell) – 3:34
20. "Can't You See" (Caldwell) – 4:38
