= A Time to Sing =

A Time to Sing may refer to:

- A Time to Sing (film), 1968, starring Hank Williams Jr. and Shelley Fabares
- A Time to Sing (album), 1968, by Hank Williams Jr.
