= Lamar Morris =

American singer-songwriter (1938–2023)

- Born: September 30, 1938
- Origin: Andalusia, Alabama, U.S.
- Died: June 1, 2023 (aged 84) Auburn, Alabama, U.S.
- Genres: Country
- Occupations: Singer, musician
- Instruments: Vocals, guitar
- Years active: 1966 – 2023
- Label: MGM
- Formerly of: The Bama Band

Lamar Morris (September 30, 1938 – June 1, 2023) was an American country music singer and musician. Between 1966 and 1973, he was a solo artist on the MGM Records label, charting in the Top 40 of Hot Country Songs with "If You Love Me", which peaked at number 27.

== Early life and career ==
Lamar Morris was born on September 30, 1938, in Andalusia, Alabama.

Morris participated in both the 1968 and 1972 Presidential campaigns of George Wallace, for which he performed several songs including "Stand Up For America" and "Wallace in the Whitehouse".

Morris was also a member of The Bama Band, Hank Williams, Jr.'s backing band. He wrote the song "Eleven Roses" for Williams.

== Personal life and death ==
On June 24, 1960, Morris married Lycrecia Ann Guy (born 1941), half-sister of Hank Williams, Jr. They since divorced. In 1996, he married Cathy Diane Ross.

Lamar Morris died in Auburn, Alabama on June 1, 2023, at the age of 84.

== Charted singles ==
Year	Single	Chart Positions	
Year	Single	US Country	CAN Country
1966	"Send Me a Box of Kleenex"	69	—
1968	"The Great Pretender"	46	—
1970	"She Came to Me"	70	—
1971	"You're the Reason I'm Living"	59	—
1971	"If You Love Me (Really Love Me)"	27	—
1971	"Near You"	74	—
1973	"You Call Everybody Darling"	71	100
