= Try, Try Again =

Try, Try Again may refer to:

In television episodes:

- "Try, Try Again" (Bigfoot Presents: Meteor and the Mighty Monster Trucks)
- "Try, Try Again" (The Brady Bunch)
- "Try, Try Again" (Eureka)
- "Try, Try Again" (Gawayn)
- "Try, Try Again" (Little People, Big World)

In other uses:

- Try, Try Again (film), a 1922 film starring James Parrott
- "Try Try Again", a song by Hank Williams, Jr. from Greatest Hits
- Try Try Again, a Thoroughbred racehorse whose offspring include Ribot

== See also ==
- "Try Try Try Again", a song by Dressy Bessy from Electrified
- "Try Again, Again" a 2006 song by Brian Posehn
- Try Again (disambiguation)
