= Fourteen Greatest Hits =

Greatest hits album by Hank Williams Jr.
- Released: 1976
- Genre: Country
- Label: Polydor

Hank Williams Jr. chronology
Hank Williams Jr. and Friends (1975)	Fourteen Greatest Hits (1976)	One Night Stands (1977)

Hank Williams Jr. Fourteen Greatest Hits is an album by American singer and songwriter Hank Williams Jr. The album was issued by Polydor Records as number MG-1-5020.

== Track listing ==
=== Side one ===
1. Eleven Roses
2. Cajun Baby
3. All For the Love of Sunshine
4. Hank
5. Rainin' in My Heart (James Moore/Jerry West)
6. Rainy Night in Georgia
7. It's All Over but the Crying

=== Side two ===
1. The Last Love Song
2. I'd Rather Be Gone
3. I'll Think of Something
4. Pride's Not Hard to Swallow
5. Ain't That a Shame (Sung with the Mike Curb Congregation)
6. I've Got a Right to Cry
7. Standing in the Shadows

== Charts ==
Chart performance for Fourteen Greatest Hits
Chart (1976)	Peak position
US Top Country Albums (Billboard)	29
