= That's How They Do It in Dixie: The Essential Collection =

Compilation album by Hank Williams Jr.
- Released: June 26, 2006
- Length: 41:07
- Label: Asylum-Curb Records
- Producer: Barry Beckett; Jimmy Bowen; Doug Johnson; Jim Ed Norman; Hank Williams Jr.

Hank Williams Jr. chronology
I'm One of You (2003)	That's How They Do It in Dixie: The Essential Collection (2006)	127 Rose Avenue (2009)

Singles from That's How They Do It in Dixie: The Essential Collection
- 1. "That's How They Do It in Dixie" Released: 2006; 2. "A Country Boy Can Survive" Released: 2007

Professional ratings
Review scores
Source	Rating
Allmusic	3.5/5 stars

That's How They Do It in Dixie: The Essential Collection is a greatest hits album by American musician Hank Williams Jr. This album was released on June 27, 2006, on the Curb Records label. This album has two brand new songs, "That's How They Do It in Dixie" and "Stirrin' It Up." The former was released as a single, while "A Country Boy Can Survive" was re-released. Both songs were made into music videos in 2006. The album debuted at No. 3 on the Billboard Country Albums chart and has been certified Gold by the RIAA, giving him the 23rd Gold album of his career.

== Track listing ==
All songs written by Hank Williams Jr., except where noted.

No.	Title	Writer(s)	Length
1.	"That's How They Do It in Dixie" (featuring Big & Rich, Gretchen Wilson and Van Zant)	Chris Tompkins, Josh Kear, Mark Irwin	3:16
2.	"Family Tradition"		4:02
3.	"All My Rowdy Friends Are Coming Over Tonight"		2:58
4.	"A Country Boy Can Survive"		4:17
5.	"Whiskey Bent and Hell Bound"		3:10
6.	"There's a Tear in My Beer" (featuring Hank Williams)	Hank Williams	2:52
7.	"If Heaven Ain't a Lot Like Dixie"	Bill Maddox	2:47
8.	"Born to Boogie"		2:43
9.	"Women I've Never Had"		2:51
10.	"Country State of Mind"	Williams Jr., Roger Alan Wade	3:58
11.	"My Name Is Bocephus"		4:42
12.	"Stirrin' It Up"		3:25

== Personnel on new tracks ==
- Tim Akers – Hammond organ
- Big & Rich – vocals on "That's How They Do It in Dixie"
- Bruce Bouton – steel guitar
- Pat Buchanan – electric guitar
- Joe Chemay – bass guitar
- Wes Hightower – background vocals
- John Barlow Jarvis – piano
- Paul Leim – drums
- Chris Leuzinger – electric guitar
- Brent Rowan – electric guitar
- Bryan Sutton – acoustic guitar
- Van Zant – vocals on "That's How They Do It in Dixie"
- Hank Williams Jr. – lead vocals
- Gretchen Wilson – vocals on "That's How They Do It in Dixie"

== Charts ==
=== Weekly charts ===
Chart (2006)	Peak position
US Billboard 200	16
US Top Country Albums (Billboard)	3

=== Year-end charts ===
Chart (2006)	Position
US Top Country Albums (Billboard)	52
Chart (2007)	Position
US Top Country Albums (Billboard)	44

== Certifications ==
Region	Certification	Certified units/sales
United States (RIAA)	Gold	500,000^{^}
^{^} Shipments figures based on certification alone.
