= Jett Williams =

American singer (born 1953)

- Born: Antha Belle Jett; January 6, 1953 (age 73); Montgomery, Alabama, U.S.
- Other names: Catherine Yvonne Stone; Cathy Louise Deupree
- Occupations: Singer; songwriter
- Spouses: Keith Adkinson (m. 1986; died 2013) Kelly Zumwalt (m. 2016)
- Parents: Hank Williams; Bobbie Jett
- Family: Hank Williams Jr. (half-brother) Hank Williams III (half-nephew) Holly Williams (half-niece) Coleman Williams (half-grandnephew)

Jett Williams (born Antha Belle Jett; January 6, 1953) is an American singer and songwriter, the daughter of Hank Williams.

== Early life ==
Born Antha Belle Jett, she is the daughter of country music icon Hank Williams and Bobbie Jett (1922–1974), whose brief relationship with Hank Williams occurred between his two marriages. She is a posthumous child; born on January 6, 1953, in Montgomery, Alabama, five days after her father's death on January 1. In December 1954, she was legally adopted by her paternal grandmother, Lillie Williams Stone, who renamed her Catherine Yvonne Stone. Following her grandmother's death in 1955, Stone was made a ward of the state of Alabama and subsequently adopted by parents who renamed her Cathy Louise Deupree.

== Court fight ==
Deupree knew she was adopted, but did not learn of her biological parents until the early 1980s. Although Hank Williams had executed a custody agreement three months before her birth that gave him custody of his unborn daughter, she was forced to go to extreme lengths to prove the relationship and be recognized as Williams's daughter.

In September 1984, she met and retained Washington, D.C., investigative attorney Keith Adkinson to help her. Within days, he obtained a copy of the custody contract, and within months had conclusive proof Deupree was defrauded for the financial gain of others. A lawsuit was filed based on this discovery. On September 28, 1986, Deupree and Adkinson married in Washington. He died on June 19, 2013. In 2016, Jett married Kelly Zumwalt.

In 1985, the Alabama State Court ruled she was the daughter of Hank Williams. On October 26, 1987, the Alabama Supreme Court ruled she was entitled to her half-share in the Williams estate, as she had been the victim of fraud and judicial error. Hank Williams Jr. appealed against the decision in federal court, but the ruling stood when the United States Supreme Court refused to hear the case in 1990.

== Book and honors ==
In 1990, she published her autobiography Ain't Nothin' as Sweet as My Baby.

In 2000, the Tennessee legislature passed HJR 621 designating May 18, 2000, as "Jett Williams Appreciation Day" in Macon County.

== Sole rights ==
In January 2006, the Tennessee Court of Appeals upheld a lower court ruling stating Hank Williams's heirs—son Randall Hank Williams (Hank Williams Jr.) and daughter Jett Williams, Hank Jr.'s half-sister—have the sole rights to sell his old recordings made for a Nashville radio station in the early 1950s. The court rejected claims made by Polygram Records and Legacy Entertainment in releasing recordings Williams made for the Mother's Best Flour Show, a program that originally aired on WSM. The recordings, which Legacy Entertainment acquired in 1997, include live versions of Williams's hits and covers of other songs. Polygram contended Williams's contract with MGM Records, which Universal Music Nashville now owns since 1998, gave them rights to release the radio recordings. In October 2008, a selection of the "Mother's Best" recordings was released by Time-Life as Hank Williams: The Unreleased Recordings.

Jett Williams released a number of albums featuring her own songs, and toured with a version of the Drifting Cowboys to sing her father's songs. Her nephew Hank Williams III is an ardent critic of her, calling her an atrocious performer and saying that she should have written a book instead.

== Discography ==
- That Reminds Me of Hank (Foundation Records, 1993)
- You Are on My Lonely Mind (Self-released, 1999)
- Honk! (Self-released, 2007)
- Mount Olive (Storytown Records, 2017)
