= Try Again =

Try Again may refer to:

- "Try Again" (Aaliyah song), 2000
- "Try Again" (Champaign song), 1983
- "Try Again" (Dilba song), 2011
- "Try Again" (Keane song), 2006
- "Try Again" (Mai Kuraki song), 2013
- "Try Again", a song by Big Star from #1 Record, 1972
- "Try Again", a song by Deadmau5 from Get Scraped, 2005
- "Try Again", a song by Dean Martin, 1954
- "Try Again", a song by Kip Moore from Slowheart, 2017
- "Try Again", a song by Patsy Cline, 1957
- "Try Again", a song by Supertramp from Supertramp, 1970
- "Try Again", a song by Teyana Taylor from The Album, 2020
- "Try Again", a song by Westlife from Westlife, 1999

== See also ==
- Try, Try Again (disambiguation)
