= Good Friends, Good Whiskey, Good Lovin' =

Single by Hank Williams Jr.

from the album Lone Wolf
- B-side: "Family Tradition"
- Released: May 3, 1990
- Genre: Country
- Length: 3:03
- Label: Warner Bros./Curb
- Songwriter: Hank Williams Jr.
- Producers: Barry Beckett; Jim Ed Norman; Hank Williams Jr.

Hank Williams Jr. singles chronology
"Ain't Nobody's Business" (1990)	"Good Friends, Good Whiskey, Good Lovin'" (1990)	"Man to Man" (1990)

"Good Friends, Good Whiskey, Good Lovin'" is a song written and recorded by American country music artist Hank Williams Jr. It was released in May 1990 as the second single from his album Lone Wolf. The song peaked at number 10 on the Billboard Hot Country Singles chart and peaked at number 16 on the Canadian RPM Country Tracks chart. This was Williams' last Top 10 hit.

== Chart performance ==
Chart (1990)	Peak position
Canada Country Singles (RPM)	16
US Hot Country Songs (Billboard)	10
