= Texas Women =

Single by Hank Williams Jr.

from the album Rowdy
- B-side: "You Can't Find Many Kissers"
- Released: February 7, 1981
- Genre: Country
- Length: 2:29
- Label: Elektra/Curb
- Songwriter(s): Hank Williams Jr.
- Producer(s): Jimmy Bowen

Hank Williams Jr. singles chronology
"Old Habits" (1980)	"Texas Women" (1981)	"Dixie on My Mind" (1981)

"Texas Women" is a song written and recorded by American musician Hank Williams Jr. It was released in February 1981 as the first single from the album Rowdy. The song was Williams Jr.'s third number one on the country chart, the first since "Eleven Roses" in 1972. The single went to number one for one week and spent a total of ten weeks on the chart.

== Charts ==
Chart (1981)	Peak position
US Hot Country Songs (Billboard)	1
Canadian RPM Country Tracks	22
