= A New Kind of Connie... =

Studio album by Connie Francis
- Released: September 1964
- Recorded: Mid 1964, New York City
- Genres: Pop; Vocal Jazz
- Length: 41 minutes 36 seconds
- Labels: MGM; SE/4253
- Producer: Danny Davis

Connie Francis chronology
| Connie Francis Sings German Favorites (1964) | A New Kind of Connie... (1964) | Connie Francis and Hank Williams Jr. Sing Great Country Favorites (1964) |

A New Kind of Connie... is the twenty-sixth studio album by American singer Connie Francis, released in September 1964 by MGM Records. The project saw her continue recording with producer Danny Davis. A New Kind of Connie... was met with a mostly positive critical reception, and also reached the charts.

== Background, recording and content ==
In 1964, Connie Francis was still having regular pop hits, but not chart-topping songs like in years before. This led her to approach a new style for more mature audiences with A New Kind of Connie, also noted as a "nightclub" style. The album was arranged by Marty Paich and produced by Danny Davis. It contained a total of 13 tracks, with them being split into six on side one, and seven on side two. Although containing old standards like "Ma (He's Making Eyes at Me)" from 1921 and "I'm Glad There Is You" from 1941, but it also featured newer tunes like "The Sweetest Sounds" by Richard Rodgers from 1962 and "I Found Myself a Guy" by Jimmy McHugh. "Will You Still Be Mine" would later also make an appearance on her 1966 Live at The Sahara in Las Vegas album, with it being thirty seconds shorter.

== Critical reception ==
Professional ratings
Review scores
| Source | Rating |
|---|---|
| Encyclopedia of Popular Music | 3/5 stars |
| Billboard | Positive (Spotlight) |
| Cashbox | Positive (Pop Picks) |
| Record World | Positive (Pick Hits) |

A New Kind of Connie... was given a positive critical response following its release, and noted for its maturity. Billboard magazine stated that the "new kind of Connie" is sophisticated, savvy and "still extremely salable." Adding, "Working with brisk arrangements prepared by Marty Paich, Connie takes hold of a flock of standards and some standout newies and shows that she can win over an adult audience without losing any of her young fans." Cashbox magazine stated that Connie Francis "displays a different, new, adult side of her vocal coin on this first-rate set of evergreens and popular items culled from her night club act." They continued, "Marty Paich has created some sparkling, lush arrangements which are aptly suited to the lark's lyrical, wide-range vocal charms. Best listening bets here include 'My Man,' 'The Sweetest Sounds' and 'My Kind of Guy,'" concluding "Disk should reach the charts in no time flat."

Record World magazine believed that the album was more mature than her previous ones; "Connie is soft and dreamy on this disk of sophisticated tunes. She bills herself as a new kind of Connie, and indeed the delivery is more mature, more searching and very romantic." High Fidelity said that "This is pop singing of a very high order: Miss Francis' clean, open singing lights up with a vocal twinkle from time to time." It was given a three-star rating by Encyclopedia of Popular Music as well, meaning that the album was "good" by the "artist's usual standards".

== Release and chart performance ==
A New Kind of Connie... was released by MGM Records in September 1964 and was the twenty-sixth studio album of her career. The album was offered as a vinyl LP. It was also her first album since Greatest American Waltzes to not have any single releases. The album debuted on Billboard magazine's Top LP's chart in the issue dated December 5, 1964, peaking at No. 149 during a two-week run on the chart. The album debuted on Cashbox magazine's Top 100 Albums chart in the issue dated November 7, 1964, peaking at No. 73 during a nine-week run on the chart.

On September 12, 2025, a couple months after Francis' death some her music was rereleased on streaming platforms for the first time, and A New Kind of Connie was one of the four albums to be rereleased, although not expanded like the rest. Francis' copyrights and royalties manager Ron Roberts teased the rerelease in August, noting that Universal Music Group would issue the album digitally very soon.

== Track listing ==
Side One
| No. | Title | Writer(s) | Length |
|---|---|---|---|
| 1. | "Will You Still Be Mine" | Matt Dennis; Tom Adair | 2:45 |
| 2. | "My Man" | Channing Pollock | 2:58 |
| 3. | "More" | Norman Newell; Riz Ortolani; Nino Oliviero | 3:04 |
| 4. | "The Sweetest Sounds" | Richard Rodgers | 2:45 |
| 5. | "I'm Glad There Is You" | Jimmy Dorsey; Paul Madeira | 3:45 |
| 6. | "Where Did Ev'ryone Go?" | Mack David; Jimmy Van Heusen | 3:40 |

Side Two
| No. | Title | Writer(s) | Length |
|---|---|---|---|
| 1. | "Ma (He's Making Eyes at Me)" | Con Conrad; Sidney Clare | 2:12 |
| 2. | "I Found Myself a Guy" | Buddy Kaye; Jimmy McHugh | 2:15 |
| 3. | "I've Got a Crush on New York Town" | Roy C. Bennett; Sid Tepper | 3:00 |
| 4. | "My Kind of Guy" | Leslie Bricusse | 2:55 |
| 5. | "You Can Take It From Me" | Chuck Blore; Stanley David Hoffman | 3:20 |
| 6. | "Where Can I Go Without You" | Peggy Lee; Victor Young | 3:40 |
| 7. | "Like Someone in Love" | Jimmy Van Heusen; Johnny Burke | 3:00 |
| Total length: | | | 41:36 |

== Chart performance ==
Chart performance for A New Kind of Connie...
| Chart (1964) | Peak position |
|---|---|
| US Billboard Top LPs | 149 |
| US Cashbox Top 100 Albums | 73 |
| US Record World 100 Top LP's | 73 |

== Release history ==
Release history and formats for A New Kind of Connie...
| Region | Date | Format | Label | Ref. |
|---|---|---|---|---|
| United States and Canada | September 1964 | Vinyl (LP) | MGM | |
| Other territories | Early 1965 | Vinyl (LP) | MGM | |
| Worldwide | September 12, 2025 | Digital; streaming | Universal Music Group | |

== Personnel ==
- Producer – Danny Davis
- Arranger – Marty Paich
- Liner notes – Jimmy McHugh
