= Coleman Williams =

American country singer (born 1991)

IV
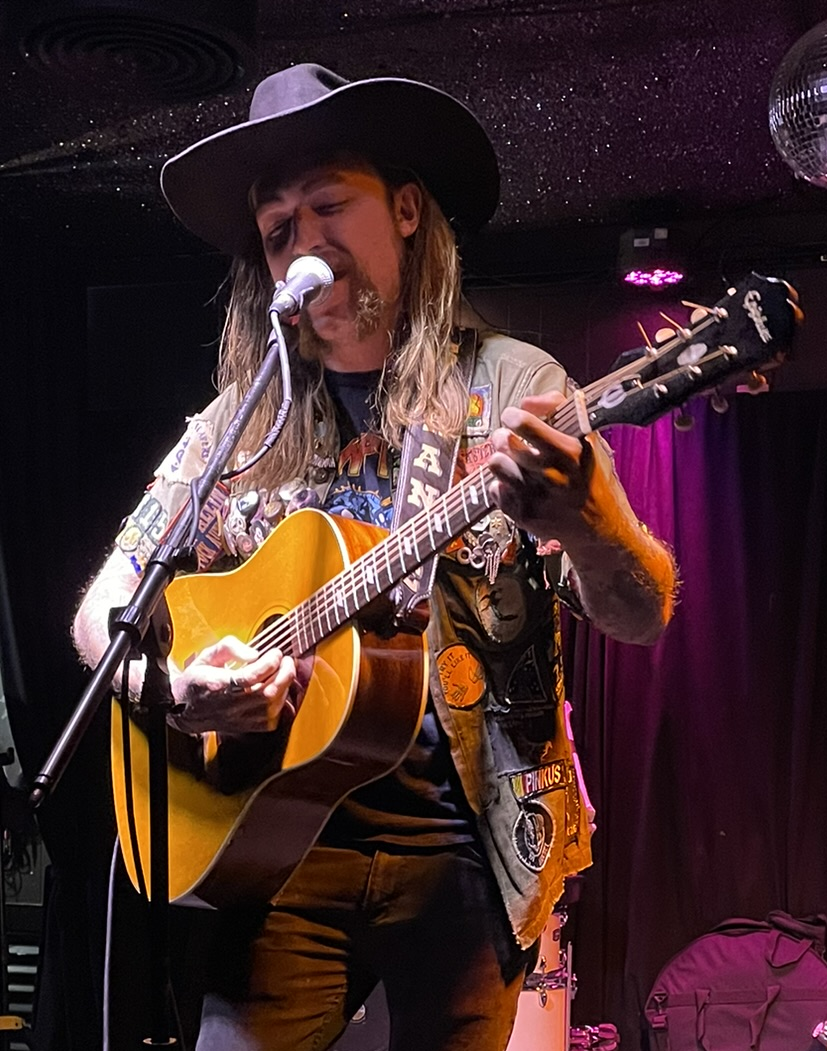
- Williams performing in 2024

Background information
- Born: Coleman Finchum; November 7, 1991 (age 34); Tennessee, U.S.
- Genres: Country; alternative country
- Occupation: Singer-songwriter
- Instruments: Vocals; guitar
- Years active: 2007–present
- Label: Black Country Rock Media
- Member of: IV and the Strange Band

Coleman Emmett Williams (November 7, 1991), known professionally as Hank IV (pronounced four), is an American country-music singer and songwriter. A member of the country music Williams dynasty, he is the son of Hank Williams III, grandson of Hank Williams Jr., and great-grandson of Hank Williams. His musician relatives also include half-aunt Holly Williams, and half-grandaunt Jett Williams.

== Biography ==
Born November 7, 1991, Williams was raised in Nashville, Tennessee, by his mother, who did not have an ongoing relationship with his father and sued him for child support when Coleman was five years old, which prompted his father's entry into the recording industry. As an adult, he adopted his father's surname. The moniker "IV" refers to his status as the fourth generation of musicians beginning with his great-grandfather Hank Williams. Williams would spend his high school years with his father, and after he graduated, he traveled the country to expand his music tastes by learning from bands all over the country. Before his time as the frontman of IV and the Strange band, Williams gained a degree in literature and spent the majority of his 20s as an 8th and 9th grade teacher in Tennessee.

In April 2021, Williams and his band released their first single, "Son of Sin". On June 17, 2022, they released their debut studio album, Southern Circus. The following year, Coleman would record his second album, Hang Dog, which was produced by friend Shooter Jennings and released November 2023.

== Discography ==
Studio albums

- Southern Circus (2022)
- Hang Dog (2023)

== Sources ==
- Harmon, Bryce (August 4, 2021). "IV & The Strange Band Set for Muddy Roots in September as Coleman Carries on Country Legacy". The Murfreesboro Pulse. Archived from the original on August 12, 2021.
