= Tryin' to Beat the Morning Home =

Single by T. G. Sheppard

from the album T. G. Sheppard
- B-side: "I'll Be Satisfied"
- Released: February 1975
- Genre: Country
- Length: 2:44
- Label: Melodyland
- Songwriter(s): T.G. Sheppard; Elroy Kahanek; Red Williams
- Producer(s): Jack Gilmer, T.G. Sheppard

T. G. Sheppard singles chronology
"Devil in the Bottle" (1974)	"Tryin' to Beat the Morning Home" (1975)	"Another Woman" (1975)

"Tryin' to Beat the Morning Home" is a song co-written and recorded by American country music artist T. G. Sheppard. It was released in February 1975 as the second single from the album T. G. Sheppard. The song was Sheppard's second hit on the country chart as well as his second number one. The single stayed at number one for a single week and spent a total of twelve weeks on the country chart. It was written by Sheppard, Elroy Kahanek and Red Williams.

== Chart performance ==
Chart (1975)	Peak position
US Hot Country Songs (Billboard)	1
US Billboard Hot 100	95
Canadian RPM Country Tracks	2
