= 127 Rose Avenue =

2009 album by Hank Williams Jr.

Studio album by Hank Williams, Jr.
- Released: June 16, 2009
- Genres: Country music, southern rock
- Length: 44:16
- Label: Curb
- Producers: Doug Johnson; Hank Williams, Jr.

Hank Williams, Jr. chronology
That's How They Do It in Dixie: The Essential Collection (2006)	127 Rose Avenue (2009)	Old School New Rules (2012)

Singles from 127 Rose Avenue
- 1. "Red, White & Pink-Slip Blues" Released: April 15, 2009; 2. "Farm Song" Released: 2009; 3. "All the Roads" Released: 2009

Professional ratings
Review scores
Source	Rating
Allmusic	3/5 stars
Roughstock	Favorable

127 Rose Avenue is the fifty-first studio album from American musician Hank Williams, Jr. This album was released June 16, 2009 on Curb Records, his last for the label. It includes the single "Red, White & Pink Slip Blues", which peaked at #43 on the U.S. country singles charts shortly before the album's release. The album title "127 Rose Avenue" is a reference to the boyhood home of Hank Williams Sr in Georgiana, AL. One of the co-writers Bud McGuire was inspired after a visit to the home, whose actual address is 127 Rose Street. The album debuted at #7 on the Billboard country chart.

== Track listing ==
No.	Title	Writer(s)	Length
1.	"Farm Song"	Rick L. Arnold, Hank Williams, Jr.	3:51
2.	"Red, White & Pink Slip Blues"	Mark Stephen Jones, Bud Tower	4:17
3.	"High Maintenance Woman"	Hank Williams, Jr.	4:27
4.	"Mighty Oak Trees"	Don Poythress, John Scott Sherrill	3:14
5.	"Forged By Fire"	Darryl Burgess, Ron Hellard	3:53
6.	"Last Driftin' Cowboy"	Hank Williams, Jr.	3:04
7.	"127 Rose Avenue"	Bud McGuire, Ray Hood, Kim Williams	4:09
8.	"All the Roads"	Hank Williams, Jr.	3:08
9.	"Sounds Like Justice"	Phil Barnhart, Carson Chamberlain, Michael White	3:57
10.	"Long Gone Lonesome Blues"	Hank Williams	6:06
11.	"Gulf Shore Road"	Hank Williams, Jr.	4:10

== Personnel ==
- Eddie Bayers – drums
- Mark Catacchia – assistant engineer
- Joe Chemay – bass guitar
- Lisa Cochran – background vocals
- Perry Coleman – background vocals
- Eric Darken – jaw harp, marimba
- Paul Franklin – steel guitar
- Aubrey Haynie – fiddle
- John Barlow Jarvis – piano
- Doug Johnson – background vocals, producer, engineer
- Jelly Roll Johnson – harmonica
- Troy Johnson – background vocals
- Troy Lancaster – electric guitar
- Paul Leim – drums
- Chris Leuzinger – electric guitar
- Ken Levitan – management
- Joe Martino – assistant engineer
- Brent Mason – electric guitar
- Patrick Murphy – engineer
- John Ozier – production coordination
- Robert Randolph – steel guitar
- Scotty Sanders – steel guitar
- Ed Seay – background vocals, engineer, mixing
- Shawn Simpson – digital editing
- Bryan Sutton – acoustic guitar
- Bobby Terry – acoustic guitar, electric guitar, baritone guitar
- Steve Turner – drums
- Dennis Wage – Hammond B-3 organ
- Craig White – digital editing
- Hank Williams, Jr. – electric guitar, lead vocals, producer
- Hank Williams – mastering

== Charts ==
=== Weekly charts ===
Chart (2009)	Peak position
US Billboard 200	19
US Top Country Albums (Billboard)	7

=== Year-end charts ===
Chart (2009)	Position
US Top Country Albums (Billboard)	75
