= It's About Time (Hank Williams Jr. album) =

Studio album by Hank Williams Jr.
- Released: January 15, 2016
- Genres: Country rock; Country
- Length: 43:42
- Label: Nash Icon
- Producer: Julian Raymond

Hank Williams Jr. chronology
Old School New Rules (2012)	It's About Time (2016)	Rich White Honky Blues (2022)

Singles from It's About Time
- 1. "Are You Ready for the Country" Released: November 2015; 2. "The Party's On" Released: May 2016

It's About Time is the fifty-third studio album by Hank Williams Jr. released by Nash Icon Records on January 15, 2016. The album includes re-recordings of previously released material and new songs.

== Reception ==
=== Critical response ===
Professional ratings
Review scores
Source	Rating
AllMusic	4/5 stars
Billboard	3/5 stars
Rolling Stone	2/5 stars

Billboard felt that the album's lyrics sent a mixed message, writing, "On the title track of his new album, It's About Time, billed as his 37th, he complains he has 'had enough of this weird pop-country sound.' But that doesn't stop him from recruiting contemporary country talents and tricks for help." Rolling Stone panned the album, writing "Country vet rocks out, waves guns around, incites snoozes". AllMusic gave the album 4 out of 5, writing "there's not a sense of a bro-country sop because this has swagger and, as the man himself says at the song's end, 'the band played like they were pissed.' All through It's About Time, Hank Jr. and his colleagues play it big and burly, laying into barroom boogies and rocking country as if they never went out of style. Williams knows this isn't true, of course. He notes that 'Those Days Are Gone' -- itself an ode to the days when you could hear Haggard, Coe, and Jones on the radio -- but he sings this ode to olden days without a tear in his eye, possibly because he's having too much fun once again raising a ruckus."

=== Commercial performance ===
The album debuted at No. 2 on Top Country Albums, the highest he's reached on the chart since the release of Lone Wolf in 1990. The album also debuted at No. 15 on the Billboard 200, selling 24,000 copies in its first week. It sold a further 9,000 copies in its second week. The album has sold 60,800 copies in the US as of March 2016.

== Track listing ==
No.	Title	Writer(s)	Length
1.	"Are You Ready for the Country" (featuring Eric Church)	Neil Young	3:29
2.	"Club U.S.A."	Tony Stampley, Bonnie Swayze	3:19
3.	"God Fearin' Man"	Chris Janson, Brandon Kinney, Kendell Marvell	2:37
4.	"Those Days Are Gone"	Janson, Brice Long, Terry McBride	3:41
5.	"Dress Like an Icon"	Hank Williams Jr.	4:13
6.	"God & Guns"	Mark Stephen Jones, Travis Meadows, Bud Tower	4:50
7.	"Just Call Me Hank"	Williams Jr.	3:02
8.	"Mental Revenge"	Mel Tillis	2:57
9.	"It's About Time"	Williams Jr.	3:29
10.	"The Party's On"	Williams Jr., Joe Kent, Stampley	2:59
11.	"Wrapped Up, Tangled Up in Jesus (God's Got It)"	Reverend Charlie Jackson	6:21
12.	"Born to Boogie" (featuring Brantley Gilbert, Justin Moore and Brad Paisley)	Williams Jr.	2:45

== Personnel ==
- Robert Bailey - background vocals
- Tom Bukovac - acoustic guitar, electric guitar
- Eric Church - duet vocals on "Are You Ready for the Country"
- J.T. Corenflos - electric guitar
- Glen Duncan - fiddle
- Kim Fleming - background vocals
- Paul Franklin - steel guitar
- Brantley Gilbert - vocals on "Born to Boogie"
- Jimmy Hall - harmonica
- Vicki Hampton - background vocals
- Mark Hill - bass guitar
- Victor Indrizzo - drums
- Chris Janson - harmonica, background vocals
- Kim Keyes - background vocals
- Tim Lauer - keyboards, piano
- Aaron Lewis - background vocals
- Regina McCrary - background vocals
- Justin Moore - vocals on "Born to Boogie"
- Brad Paisley - electric guitar solo and vocals on "Born to Boogie"
- Deborah Person - background vocals
- Jimmie Lee Sloas - bass guitar
- Tara Thompson - background vocals
- Ilya Toshinsky - banjo, acoustic guitar
- Hank Williams Jr. - lead vocals

== Charts ==
=== Weekly charts ===
Chart (2016)	Peak position
Canadian Albums (Billboard)	84
US Billboard 200	15
US Top Country Albums (Billboard)	2

=== Year-end charts ===
Chart (2016)	Position
US Top Country Albums (Billboard)	37
