= Cajun Baby =

Single by Hank Williams, Jr.

from the album Songs My Father Left Me
- B-side: "My Heart Won't Let Me Go"
- Released: April 7, 1969
- Recorded: December 4, 1968
- Genre: Country
- Length: 2:41
- Label: MGM
- Songwriters: Hank Williams, Hank Williams, Jr.

Hank Williams, Jr. singles chronology
| "A Baby Again" (1969) | "Cajun Baby" (1969) | "Be Careful of Stones That You Throw" (1969) |

"Cajun Baby" is a country song with words by Hank Williams set to music and performed by his son Hank Williams Jr. in 1969. The single hit US country radio stations in April and rose to number 3 in May 1969 on the Hot Country Songs chart; the same chart attainment as his previous single, "It's All Over But the Crying" (1968).

The senior Williams died in 1953 with some unpublished lyrics among his effects. His son adapted these lyrics and composed music for them to create the album Songs My Father Left Me in 1969. The lyrics to "Cajun Baby" were probably written in 1952 when Hank Williams Jr was 2–3 years old.

In 1988, fiddler and singer Doug Kershaw recruited Williams to join him singing "Cajun Baby" as a duet. This version was released as an independent single which hit number 50 on the country chart.

== See also ==
- List of songs written by Hank Williams
