= After You, Pride's Not Hard to Swallow =

Studio album by Hank Williams Jr.
- Released: March 1973
- Genre: Country
- Length: 25:25
- Label: MGM, Polydor
- Producer: Jim Vienneau

Hank Williams Jr. chronology
| The Legend of Hank Williams in Song and Story (1973) | After You, Pride's Not Hard to Swallow (1973) | The Last Love Song (1974) |

After You, Pride's Not Hard To Swallow is the twenty-first studio album by American musician Hank Williams Jr. The album was issued by MGM Records as number SE 4862. It was later reissued by Polydor Records as number 811 904-1.

"After You" was originally recorded by George Jones on July 8, 1971 and released on his 1972 album, Wrapped Around Her Finger. "I Love You a Thousand Ways" is a cover of the 1950 Lefty Frizzell song that's been covered by many other artists including John Anderson on his 1981 album, John Anderson 2. "She Went a Little Bit Farther" is a cover of a 1967 song by Lew DeWitt that was also recorded by Faron Young in 1968. "A Picture of Me (Without You)" was originally recorded by George Jones on his 1972 album, A Picture of Me (Without You).

== Track listing ==
=== Side One ===
1. "After You" (Jerry Chesnut) – 3:05
2. "Name Dropper" (Glenn Martin, Jeannie Seely) – 2:55
3. "I Love You a Thousand Ways" (Lefty Frizzell, Jim Beck) – 2:35
4. "One Out of Three Ain't Bad" (Hank Williams Jr.) – 1:55
5. "She Went a Little Bit Farther" (Mack Vickery, Merle Kilgore) – 2:23

=== Side Two ===
1. "Pride's Not Hard to Swallow" (Jerry Chesnut) – 3:08
2. "I Can't Cry Back In" (Wayne Walker) – 2:29
3. "Country Music (Those Tear Jerking Songs)" (Williams Jr., Merle Kilgore) – 1:53
4. "A Picture of Me (Without You)" (Norro Wilson, George Richey) – 2:12
5. "Knoxville Courthouse Blues" (Williams Jr.) – 2:50

== Charts ==
Chart performance for After You, Pride's Not Hard to Swallow
| Chart (1973) | Peak position |
|---|---|
| US Top Country Albums (Billboard) | 20 |
