= Hank Live =

Live album by Hank Williams Jr.
- Released: January 1987
- Recorded: June 28, 1986 – September 19, 1986
- Genre: Country
- Length: 41:06
- Label: Warner Bros.
- Producer: Barry Beckett; Jim Ed Norman; Hank Williams Jr.

Hank Williams Jr. chronology
Montana Cafe (1986)	Hank Live (1987)	Born to Boogie (1987)

Professional ratings
Review scores
Source	Rating
Allmusic	3/5 stars

Hank Live is a live album by American musician Hank Williams Jr. It was released by Warner Bros. Records in January 1987. The album reached No. 1 on the Top Country Albums chart and has been certified platinum by the RIAA.

== Track listing ==
1. "Intro/Hank Williams, Jr." (Dickey Betts, Bonnie Bramlett) – 0:43
2. "My Name Is Bocephus" (Hank Williams Jr.) – 3:49
3. "Workin' for MCA" (Ed King, Ronnie Van Zant) – 1:20
4. "I Really Like Girls" (George Thorogood) – 3:42
5. "If You Don't Like Hank Williams" (Kris Kristofferson) – 2:31
6. "Sweet Home Alabama" (King, Gary Rossington, Van Zant) – 2:07
7. "Spoken Intro/La Grange" (Dusty Hill, Frank Beard, Billy Gibbons) – 8:42
8. "Medley: Trouble in Mind/Short Haired Woman" (Richard M. Jones) – 5:34
9. "The Conversation" (Waylon Jennings, Ritchie Albright, Hank Williams Jr.) – 1:49
10. "Man of Steel" (Hank Williams Jr.) – 1:05
11. "I'm for Love" (Hank Williams Jr.) – 3:14
12. "If Heaven Ain't a Lot Like Dixie" (Billy Maddox, David Moore) – 1:09
13. "All My Rowdy Friends (Have Settled Down)" (Hank Williams Jr.) – 2:21
14. "House of the Rising Sun" (Traditional) – 3:21
15. "The Ride" (J. B. Detterline Jr., Gary Gentry) – 2:41
16. "A Country Boy Can Survive" (Hank Williams Jr.) – 4:53
17. "Medley: Family Tradition/Hey Good Lookin'" (Hank Williams Jr.. Hank Williams) – 3:02

== Personnel ==
- Ray Barrickman – bass guitar
- Vernon Derrick – fiddle
- Billy Earheart – keyboards, piano
- Merle Kilgore – acoustic guitar, background vocals
- "Cowboy" Eddie Long – pedal steel guitar
- Bill Marshall – drums
- Jerry McKinney – saxophone
- Lamar Morris – electric guitar
- Wayne Turner – electric guitar
- Hank Williams Jr. – acoustic guitar, electric guitar, lead vocals

== Chart performance ==
Chart (1987)	Peak position
U.S. Billboard Top Country Albums	1
U.S. Billboard 200	71

== Certifications ==
Region	Certification	Certified units/sales
United States (RIAA)	Platinum	1,000,000^{^}
^{^} Shipments figures based on certification alone.
