= Live at Cobo Hall =

Hank Williams Jr. Live at Cobo Hall Detroit

Live album by Hank Williams Jr.
- Released: July 1969
- Recorded: Cobo Hall, Washington Blvd., Detroit
- Genre: Country
- Length: 25:26
- Labels: MGM, Polydor
- Producer: Jim Vienneau

Hank Williams Jr. chronology
Luke the Drifter Jr. Vol. 2 (1969)	Hank Williams Jr. Live at Cobo Hall Detroit (1969)	Hank Williams Jr. Singing My Songs (Johnny Cash) (1970)

Live at Cobo Hall is a live album by American musician Hank Williams Jr. The full title is Hank Williams Jr. Live at Cobo Hall Detroit. The album was issued by MGM Records as number SE 4644 and later re-issued by Polydor Records as 811 902–1.

== Track listing ==
All tracks composed by Hank Williams; except where indicated

=== Side one ===
1. "Jambalaya" – 1:46
2. "Detroit City" (Danny Dill, Mel Tillis) – 2:52
3. "Games People Play" (Joe South) – 2:41
4. "Standing in the Shadows" (Hank Williams Jr.) – 3:14
5. "Foggy Mountain Breakdown" (Earl Scruggs) – 1:57
6. "You Win Again" – 2:51

=== Side two ===
1. "She Thinks I Still Care" (Dickey Lee, Steve Duffy) – 2:48
2. "Darling, You Know I Wouldn't Lie" (Hollis Delaughter, Wayne Kemp) – 3:46
3. "I'm So Lonesome I Could Cry" – 2:36
4. "I Saw The Light" – 0:55

== Personnel ==
- Hank Williams Jr. – vocals, guitar

Technical

- Val Valentin – director of engineering
- Sid Maurer – art direction
- Jim O'Connel - cover design
- Jerry Dempnock – photography

== Charts ==
Chart performance for Live at Cobo Hall
Chart (1969–1970)	Peak position
US Billboard 200	187
US Top Country Albums (Billboard)	3
