= Habits Old and New =

1980 album by Hank Williams Jr.

Studio album by Hank Williams Jr.
- Released: June 1980
- Length: 34:37
- Label: Elektra/Curb
- Producer: Jimmy Bowen

Hank Williams Jr. chronology
Whiskey Bent and Hell Bound (1979)	Habits Old and New (1980)	Rowdy (1981)

Singles from Habits Old and New
- 1. "Old Habits" Released: August 30, 1980

Professional ratings
Review scores
Source	Rating
AllMusic	2.5/5 stars

Habits Old and New is the thirty-first studio album by American musician Hank Williams Jr. and was released under Elektra Records/Curb Records in June 1980. Habits Old and New was Williams' third full-length album in a fourteen-month span, following Family Tradition and Whiskey Bent and Hell Bound that were released in April and November 1979. It was also his fifth album on the Elektra/Curb label.

== Critical reception ==
The album was not as critically acclaimed or commercially successful as Family Tradition and Whiskey Bent and Hell Bound. It peaked at number 4 on the Billboard Top Country Albums chart and produced two Top 20 singles. The first single released was a modern and up tempo version of "Kaw-Liga", a song written by Hank Williams, Sr. and Fred Rose. It was released as a single after Hank, Sr.'s death in January 1953 and spent fourteen weeks at number 1 on the Billboard country singles chart. Hank, Jr.'s version wasn't as successful, eventually peaking at number 12 on the Billboard Hot Country Singles & Tracks chart. The follow-up single was an original song of Hank, Jr. titled "Old Habits" that fared better, peaking at number 6 on the Hot Country Singles & Tracks chart. Habits Old and New would eventually be certified Gold by the RIAA, making it his fourth career Gold album and his third consecutive Gold while signed with Curb.

== Track listing ==
All tracks composed by Hank Williams Jr.; except where indicated

No.	Title	Writer(s)	Length
1.	"Old Habits"		3:02
2.	"Dinosaur"	Hank Williams Jr., Bob Corbin	3:17
3.	"Kaw-Liga"	Hank Williams, Fred Rose	4:21
4.	"Here I Am Fallin' Again"		3:37
5.	"The Blues Man"		4:18
6.	"All In Alabama"		4:01
7.	"The American Way"		3:04
8.	"Move It On Over"	Williams Sr.	3:05
9.	"Won't It Be Nice"	Williams Jr., Merle Kilgore	3:08
10.	"If You Don't Like Hank Williams"	Kris Kristofferson	2:51

== Personnel ==
- Hank Williams, Jr. - vocals, acoustic and electric guitar, keyboards
- Leo Jackson, Rock Killough, Randy Scruggs - acoustic guitar
- Rock Killough, Sonny Throckmorton, Dennis Wilson - backing vocals
- Bobby Thompson - banjo
- Joe Osborn - bass
- Jerry Carrigan, Larrie Londin - drums
- Dan Eckley, Reggie Young - electric guitar
- Lisa Silver, Rufus Thibodeaux - fiddle
- Muscle Shoals Horns - horns
- Bobby Emmons, Larry Knechtel, Shane Keister - keyboards
- Kieran Kane - mandolin
- Dicky Overbey - steel guitar, percussion

== Chart performance ==
Chart (1980)	Peak position
U.S. Billboard Top Country Albums	4
U.S. Billboard 200	154
Canadian RPM Country Albums	7

== Certifications ==
Region	Certification	Certified units/sales
United States (RIAA)	Gold	500,000^{^}
^{^} Shipments figures based on certification alone.
