= Dixie on My Mind =

Single by Hank Williams Jr.

from the album Rowdy
- B-side: "Ramblin' Man"
- Released: May 30, 1981
- Genre: Country, country rock
- Length: 2:37
- Label: Elektra/Curb
- Songwriter: Hank Williams Jr.
- Producer: Jimmy Bowen

Hank Williams Jr. singles chronology
"Texas Women" (1981)	"Dixie on My Mind" (1981)	"All My Rowdy Friends (Have Settled Down)" (1981)

"Dixie on My Mind" is a song written and recorded by American country music artist Hank Williams Jr. It was released in May 1981 as the second single from the album Rowdy. The song was Williams Jr.'s fourth number one on the country chart. The single went to number one for one week and spent nine weeks on the country chart.

== Content ==
The song features Hank attempting to give big city life a fair shot (New York City in particular) but ends up feeling more dissatisfied than ever with city life, but is unable to return home ("Lord I'm stuck up here but I've got Dixie on my mind").

== Chart performance ==
Chart (1981)	Peak position
US Hot Country Songs (Billboard)	1
Canadian RPM Country Tracks	41

== Certifications ==
Region	Certification	Certified units/sales
United States (RIAA)	Gold	500,000^{‡}
^{‡} Sales+streaming figures based on certification alone.
