= Stormy (album) =

Studio album by Hank Williams Jr.
- Released: August 31, 1999
- Genre: Country
- Length: 38:16
- Label: Curb Records
- Producer: Chuck Howard; Hank Williams Jr.

Hank Williams Jr. chronology
| Early Years, Vol. 2 (1998) | Stormy (1999) | The Almeria Club Recordings (2002) |

Stormy is the forty-eighth studio album by American country music artist Hank Williams Jr. It was released on August 31, 1999 by Curb Records.

== Track listing ==
1. "They All Want to Go Wild (And I Want to Go Home)" – 3:11
2. "I'd Love to Knock the Hell Out of You" – 3:06
3. "Gibbonsville Gold" – 4:59
4. "Where Would We Be Without Yankees" – 3:20
5. "Naked Women and Beer" – 4:02
6. "I Like It When It's Stormy" – 3:47
7. "Southern Thunder" – 4:59
8. "Hank Hill Is the King" – 2:45
9. "All Jokes Aside" – 4:06
10. "Sometimes I Feel Like Joe Montana" – 4:01

== Personnel ==
- Eddie Bayers – drums, percussion
- Mike Chapman – bass guitar
- J.T. Corenflos – 7-string acoustic guitar, acoustic guitar
- Dan Dugmore – pedal steel guitar
- Stuart Duncan – fiddle
- Paul Franklin – pedal steel guitar
- Kenny Greenberg – electric guitar
- John Hobbs – keyboards, piano
- Jim Horn – saxophone
- Bill Hullett – 7-string acoustic guitar, acoustic guitar
- Michael Landau – 7-string electric guitar, electric guitar
- Brent Mason – 7-string electric guitar, electric guitar
- Greg Morrow – drums, percussion
- Michael Rhodes – bass guitar
- Mike Rojas – keyboards, piano
- Brent Rowan – 7-string electric guitar, electric guitar
- John Wesley Ryles – background vocals
- Michael Spriggs – acoustic guitar
- Neil Thrasher – background vocals
- Hank Williams Jr. – lead vocals
- Dennis Wilson – background vocals
- Glenn Worf – bass guitar
- Curtis Young – background vocals

== Chart performance ==
Chart performance for Stormy
| Chart (1999) | Peak position |
|---|---|
| US Top Country Albums (Billboard) | 21 |
| US Billboard 200 | 162 |
