= Rich White Honky Blues =

2022 album by Hank Williams Jr.

Studio album by Hank Williams Jr.
- Released: June 16, 2022
- Genre: Blues
- Length: 45:45
- Label: Easy Eye Sound
- Producer: Dan Auerbach

Hank Williams Jr. chronology
It's About Time (2016)	Rich White Honky Blues (2022)

Rich White Honky Blues is the 54th studio album by American musician Hank Williams Jr. The album is a collection of blues covers and was produced by Dan Auerbach from the rock group the Black Keys. Williams said in an interview that almost all the songs were recorded in one take. The Country Music Hall of Famer also mentioned that the album includes blues standards popularized by Lightnin' Hopkins, R.L. Burnside, and Muddy Waters, among others.

To the surprise of fans, Thunderhead Hawkins also makes an appearance on the album. The latter is Williams's alter ego when he is singing the blues. The album was inspired partly by legendary actor Redd Foxx, who was a big fan of Hank Williams, Sr. Williams Jr. states that he met the actor when he was a young boy, and recalled how Redd told his mother Audrey Williams about his love for Williams Sr.'s music. Williams Jr. never forgot about the encounter, and it inspired him to record Rich White Honky Blues.

The album marks Williams Jr.'s first entry on the Billboard Blues Albums Chart, on which Rich White Honky Blues peaked at number one on July 2, 2022. Hank Williams Jr supported the album with a 2023 tour produced by Live Nation that started on May 12, 2023.

== Track listing ==
Rich White Honky Blues track listing
No.	Title	Writer(s)	Length
1.	".44 Special Blues"	Robert Johnson	1:58
2.	"Georgia Women"	Kenny Brown; R. L. Burnside	4:05
3.	"My Starter Won't Start"	Lightnin' Hopkins	3:14
4.	"Take Out Some Insurance"	Charles Singleton; Waldenese Hall (credited to Jesse Stone (Note: Songwriter is listed as Jimmy Reed who performed the song, but it was not written by him.))	3:58
5.	"Rich White Honky Blues"	Hank Williams Jr.	3:56
6.	"Short Haired Woman"	Hopkins (Note: Additional songwriter Mack McCormick is listed, but he did not write it.)	4:53
7.	"Fireman Ring the Bell"	Burnside	5:28
8.	"Rock Me Baby"	McKinley Morganfield	3:57
9.	"I Like It When It's Stormy"	Williams Jr.	3:19
10.	"Call Me Thunderhead"	Williams Jr.	4:03
11.	"TV Mama"	Lou Willie Turner	4:04
12.	"Jesus, Won't You Come by Here"	Hopkins	2:50
Total length:			45:45

== Charts ==
Chart performance for Rich White Honky Blues
Chart (2022)	Peak position
US Billboard 200	183
US Top Blues Albums (Billboard)	1
US Top Country Albums (Billboard)	22
