= Hank Williams Jr. Sings the Songs of Hank Williams =

Studio album by Hank Williams Jr.
- Released: May 1964
- Studio: MGM Studios (Culver City, California)
- Genre: Country; honky-tonk
- Length: 29:38
- Label: MGM
- Producer: Jim Vienneau

Hank Williams Jr. chronology
Hank Williams Jr. Sings the Songs of Hank Williams (1964)	Your Cheatin' Heart (1964)

Singles from Hank Williams Jr. Sings the Songs of Hank Williams
- 1. "Long Gone Lonesome Blues" Released: January 1964

Hank Williams Jr. Sings the Songs of Hank Williams is the debut studio album by American artist Hank Williams Jr.

== Background ==
Williams Jr. first gained notability by singing his father, Hank Williams Sr.'s, song "Lovesick Blues" at the Grand Ole Opry and winning a curtain call.

The album is a collection of 12 covers of William Sr.'s songs and was recorded when Williams Jr. was 14 years old.

== Reception ==
Professional ratings
Review scores
Source	Rating
AllMusic	4/5 stars

The album was nominated for a Grammy Award for Best Country & Western Album at the 7th Annual Grammy Awards.

Mary Campbell of the Connecticut Post praised the album and called Williams Jr. a "stylish interpreter of his late great father's great music." Kathleen A. Rowley of the Courier-Post commented, "the style Hank Jr. displays in the MGM album is plaintive, homespun and embellished with a few yodels. Country music fans may consider this a gem but 'pops' music fans may find Hank Jr. sounds too much like a hound-dawg baying at the moon at midnight."

== Track listing ==
All tracks are written by Hank Williams, with additional co-writers as noted.

Side 1
No.	Title	Length
1.	"Long Gone Lonesome Blues"	2:35
2.	"Your Cheatin' Heart"	2:10
3.	"I'm So Lonesome I Could Cry"	2:30
4.	"I'm a Long Gone Daddy"	2:25
5.	"Cold, Cold Heart"	2:26
6.	"Hey, Good Lookin'"	2:05
Total length:		29:38

Side 2
No.	Title	Writer(s)	Length
1.	"You Win Again"		2:51
2.	"Moanin' the Blues"		2:14
3.	"I Can't Help It (If I'm Still in Love with You)"		2:37
4.	"There'll Be No Teardrops Tonight"		2:29
5.	"Jambalaya (On the Bayou)"		2:13
6.	"Mansion on the Hill"	Fred Rose	2:37

== Charts ==
Chart performance for Hank Williams Jr. Sings the Songs of Hank Williams
Chart (1964)	Peak position
US Top Country Albums (Billboard)	12
