= Ballads of the Hills and Plains =

Studio album by Hank Williams Jr.
- Released: September 1965
- Recorded: July 1965
- Studio: Columbia Recording Studios, Nashville
- Genre: Country, Western music, Cowboy Music
- Length: 32:17
- Label: MGM
- Producer: Jim Vienneau

Hank Williams Jr. chronology
Father & Son (1965)	Ballads of the Hills and Plains (1965)	Blues My Name (1966)

Professional ratings
Review scores
Source	Rating
AllMusic	4.5/5 stars

Ballads of the Hills and Plains is the fourth studio album by American musician Hank Williams Jr. The album was issued by MGM Records as number E/SE 4316.

== Track listing ==
=== Side one ===
1. "The River" (Cliff Friend, Jack Sanders, Mack Vickery) – 2:53
2. "Doc Holiday" (John Paulovic) – 2:09
3. "Cowpoke" (Tillman Franks, David Houston) – 2:06
4. "Blood's Thicker Than Water" (Danny Dill, Wayne Walker) – 2:32
5. "The Blizzard" (Harlan Howard) – 3:24
6. "Stampede" (Jim Dale, Frances Paulin) – 2:40

=== Side two ===
1. "The Rainmaker" (Friend, Sanders, Vickery) – 2:34
2. "Streets of Laredo" (Traditional) – 4:04
3. "Black Lightning" (Ricky Hester) – 2:56
4. "Big Twenty" (Mel Tillis) – 2:00
5. "The Eyes of Death" (Dill) – 2:42
6. "I'm Afraid" (Allen Nelson, Carolyn Stringer) – 2:17

== Personnel ==
- Hank Williams Jr. – guitar, vocals

=== Hank Williams Jr. and the Cheatin' Hearts ===
- Grady Martin, Jerry Kennedy, Harold Bradley, Ray Edenton – guitar
- Bob Moore – bass
- Hargus "Pig" Robbins – piano
- The Jordanaires – vocal accompaniment
