= Old Habits =

Single by Hank Williams Jr.

from the album Habits Old and New
- B-side: ""Won't It Be Nice"
- Released: August 30, 1980
- Genre: Country
- Length: 3:03
- Label: Elektra/Curb
- Songwriter(s): Hank Williams Jr.
- Producer(s): Jimmy Bowen

Hank Williams Jr. singles chronology
"Kaw-Liga" (1980)	"Old Habits" (1980)	"Texas Women" (1981)

"Old Habits" is a song written and recorded by American musician Hank Williams Jr. It was released in August 1980 as the second single from the album Habits Old and New. The song reached #6 on the Billboard Hot Country Singles & Tracks chart.

== Chart performance ==
Chart (1980)	Peak position
US Hot Country Songs (Billboard)	6
Canadian RPM Country Tracks	58
