= Hank Williams Jr. and Friends =

Hank Williams Jr. & Friends

Studio album by Hank Williams Jr.
- Released: December 1975
- Recorded: February–July 1975
- Genre: Outlaw Country; Country rock
- Length: 32:10
- Label: MGM
- Producer: Dick Glasser

Hank Williams Jr. chronology
Bocephus (1975)	Hank Williams Jr. & Friends (1975)	Fourteen Greatest Hits (1976)

Alternative Cover
- 2000 reissue by Mercury Records

Professional ratings
Review scores
Source	Rating
Allmusic	5/5 stars
Christgau's Record Guide	A−
The Village Voice	A−

Hank Williams Jr. & Friends is the twenty-sixth studio album by Hank Williams Jr.

== Composition ==
Hank Williams Jr. & Friends is Williams' breakthrough album, featuring Williams' own unique style as opposed to imitating his father's. The album's sound has been classified as country rock, southern rock and outlaw country.

== Production ==
According to Williams' autobiography, Living Proof, the album was recorded in Muscle Shoals, Alabama, at Music Mill Studios between February and July 1975. The album insert says that this was recorded at Capricorn Studios in Macon, Georgia.

== Release ==
The album was issued by MGM Records as number M3G5009 and was later reissued by Polydor Records as number 831 575-4 Y-1. It was also reissued on CD in 2000 by Mercury Records, a division of UMG Recordings, Inc.

=== Critical reception ===
The Village Voice critic Robert Christgau said, "The authority of Williams' voice and persona, plus the good sense of his songwriting and selection, focuses an Allman and a Marshall Tucker and a Charlie Daniels into what I'm sure will stand as the best Southern-style rock of the year." Years later, the Allmusic editor, Thom Jurek cited, Hank Williams Jr. & Friends as "one of the best country-rock albums ever made and stands with the best of the outlaw recordings of the era".

== Track listing ==
Side A
No.	Title	Writer(s)	Length
1.	"Losin' You"	Toy Caldwell	3:42
2.	"On Susan's Floor"	Vince Matthews, Shel Silverstein	3:22
3.	"I Really Did"	Hank Williams Jr.	2:42
4.	"Can't You See"	Caldwell	4:40

Side B
No.	Title	Writer(s)	Length
5.	"Montana Song"	Williams Jr.	3:29
6.	"Clovis, New Mexico"	Williams Jr.	3:53
7.	"Brothers of the Road"	Williams Jr.	3:57
8.	"Stoned at the Jukebox"	Williams Jr.	2:44
9.	"(The) Living Proof"	Williams Jr.	3:41
Total length:			32:10

== Personnel ==
Credits are adapted from the album's 2000 Mercury Records reissue liner notes.

- Hank Williams Jr – lead vocals
- Jerry Wallace – acoustic guitar
- Gary Boggs – steel guitar
- Pete Carr – lead guitar
- Lenny LeBlanc – bass guitar
- Roger Clark – drums
- Ronnie Oldham – piano, keyboards
- Ken Bell – acoustic guitar
- Dick Overby – steel guitar
- Charlie Daniels – fiddle on "Losin' You"
- Toy Caldwell – steel guitar on "Montana Song" and "Can't You See"
- Chuck Leavell – organ on "On Susan's Floor"
- Harmony vocalists – Sue Richards, Dick Glasser, Ava Aldridge, Jim Glaser, Eddie Struzick, George Soule, Lenny LeBlanc

== Charts ==
Chart performance for Hank Williams Jr. and Friends
Chart (1976)	Peak position
US Top Country Albums (Billboard)	17
