= Luke the Drifter Jr. – Vol. 2 =

Studio album by Hank Williams Jr.
- Released: April 1969
- Genre: Country
- Length: 29:48
- Labels: MGM, Polydor
- Producer: Jim Vienneau

Hank Williams Jr. chronology
Songs My Father Left Me (1969)	Luke the Drifter Jr. – Vol. 2 (1969)	Live at Cobo Hall (1969)

Luke The Drifter Jr. – Vol. 2 is the twelfth studio album by American musician Hank Williams Jr. The album was issued by MGM Records as number SE 4632 and later reissued by Polydor Records as number 831 576-1 Y-1.

== Track listing ==
=== Side one ===
1. "Custody" (Steve Karlinski, Larry Kolber) – 2:25
2. "Just Waitin'" (Hank Williams, Bob Cazzaway) – 2:49
3. "Beyond the Sunset" (B. Brock, Virgil P. Brock, Roswell) – 3:14
4. "The Chair That Rocked Us All" (Jerry Chestnut) – 2:26
5. "These Men Who Never Sleep" (Vincent Matthews) – 2:24
6. "A Picture from Life's Other Side" (Hank Williams) – 2:00

=== Side two ===
1. "Be Careful of Stones That You Throw" (Bonnie Dodd) – 3:01
2. "Life Gets Tee-Jus Don't It" (Carson J. Robison) – 3:30
3. "Does Your Mama Know You're Here" (Bob Hampton) – 1:53
4. "I've Been Down That Road Before" (Hank Williams) – 3:20
5. "Too Many Parties and Too Many Pals" (Ray Henderson, Billy Rose, Mort Dixon) – 2:46
