= Blues My Name =

Studio album by Hank Williams Jr.
- Released: 1966
- Genre: Country
- Label: MGM, Polydor
- Producer: Jim Vienneau

Hank Williams Jr. chronology
Ballads of the Hills and Plains (1965)	Blues My Name (1966)	Country Shadows (1966)

Professional ratings
Review scores
Source	Rating
AllMusic	4/5 stars

Blues My Name is the fifth studio album by American musician Hank Williams Jr. The album was issued by MGM Records as number E/SE 4344 and later re-issued by Polydor Records as 833 069-1 Y-1.

== Track listing ==
=== Side One ===
1. "Salt Lake City" (Curly Putman, Ronnie Hawkins)
2. "A Good Leavin' Alone" (Ronnie Self)
3. "Weary Blues from Waitin'" (Hank Williams)
4. "Wrong Doin' Man" (James Golemon, Guy Golemon)
5. "These Boots Are Made for Walkin'" (Lee Hazlewood)
6. "Cry, Cry, Darling" (J.D. Miller, Jimmy C. Newman)

=== Side Two ===
1. "It's Written All Over Your Face" (Mack Vickery)
2. "When You're Tired of Breaking Other Hearts" (Curley Williams, Hank Williams)
3. "Blues My Name" (Don Wayne)
4. "Low As a Man Can Go" (Mack Vickery)
5. "Old Frank" (Mack Vickery)
6. "So Easy to Forgive Her (But So Hard to Forget)" (Dick Overby)

== Personnel ==
- Hank Williams Jr. – guitar, vocals
- The Jordanaires – vocal accompaniment
- Mort Thomasson – engineer
- Val Valentin – director of engineering
- Acy Lehman – cover, design
- Walden S. Fabry – photography
