= Greatest Hits (Hank Williams Jr. album) =

Compilation album by Hank Williams, Jr.

Greatest hits album by Hank Williams Jr.
- Released: 1969
- Genre: Country
- Length: 27:53
- Label: MGM

Hank Williams Jr. chronology
The Best of Hank Williams Jr. (1967)	Greatest Hits (1969)	Hank Williams Jr.'s Greatest Hits (1972)

Greatest Hits is an album by American country music singer and songwriter Hank Williams Jr. The Album was issued by MGM Records as number SE 4656. It reached No. 7 on Billboard's chart of Country Albums in 1970.

== Track listing ==
=== Side one ===
1. It's All Over But the Crying – 2:34
2. Cajun Baby – 2:38
3. Standing in the Shadows – 3:07
4. Homesick – 2:24
5. Where Do I Go From Here – 2:21
6. Try Try Again – 2:22

=== Side two ===
1. I'd Rather Be Gone – 2:42
2. A Baby Again – 2:49
3. Are You Lonely Too – 2:33
4. Rock in My Shoe – 2:08
5. My Heart Won't Let Me Go – 2:15
