= Rowdy (Hank Williams Jr. album) =

Studio album by Hank Williams Jr.
- Released: January 1981
- Genre: Country
- Length: 29:11
- Label: Elektra/Curb
- Producer: Jimmy Bowen

Hank Williams Jr. chronology
Habits Old and New (1980)	Rowdy (1981)	The Pressure Is On (1981)

Singles from Rowdy
- 1. "Texas Women" Released: February 7, 1981; 2. "Dixie on My Mind" Released: May 30, 1981

Professional ratings
Review scores
Source	Rating
AllMusic	3/5 stars
The Rolling Stone Album Guide	3/5 stars

Rowdy is a studio album by American musician Hank Williams Jr. It was released by Elektra/Curb Records in January 1981. "Texas Women" and "Dixie on My Mind" were released as singles, both peaking at #1 on the Billboard Hot Country Singles chart. The album peaked at number 2 on the Billboard Top Country Albums chart and has been certified Gold by the RIAA.

== Track listing ==
No.	Title	Writer(s)	Length
1.	"Dixie on My Mind"	Hank Williams Jr.	2:37
2.	"Texas Women"	Williams	2:29
3.	"You Can't Find Many Kissers"	Williams	2:36
4.	"Give a Damn"	Williams	2:34
5.	"Ain't Much More"	Williams	2:30
6.	"Ramblin' Man"	Williams	3:36
7.	"I Got a Right to Be Wrong"	Dickey Betts	3:08
8.	"Footlights"	Merle Haggard	3:54
9.	"Tennessee River"	Randy Owen	3:06
10.	"Are You Sure Hank Done It This Way"	Waylon Jennings	3:05

== Personnel ==
- 12-String Acoustic Guitar: Bobby Thompson
- Acoustic Guitar: Bobby Thompson, Jon Goin, Hank Williams Jr.
- Banjo: Bobby Thompson
- Bass guitar: Joe Osborn, Stephen Schaffer on "Ramblin' Man"
- Congas: Larrie Londin
- Dobro: Hank Williams Jr.
- Drums: Larrie Londin
- Electric guitar: Fred Newell, Jon Goin, Reggie Young
- Fiddle: Jerry Rivers, Lisa Silver
- Harmonica: Terry McMillan
- Horns: Irv Kane, John Gore, Terry Mead
- Lead Vocals: Hank Williams Jr.
- Keyboards: Alan Moore, Larry Knechtel
- Mandolin: Kieran Kane
- Marimba: Farrell Morris
- Organ: Alan Moore
- Steel Guitar: "Cowboy" Eddie Long
- Tambourine: Farrell Morris

== Charts ==
=== Weekly charts ===
Chart (1981)	Peak position
Canadian Country Albums (RPM)	20
US Billboard 200	82
US Top Country Albums (Billboard)	2

=== Year-end charts ===
Chart (1981)	Position
US Top Country Albums (Billboard)	12
Chart (1982)	Position
US Top Country Albums (Billboard)	33

== Certifications ==
Region	Certification	Certified units/sales
United States (RIAA)	Gold	500,000^{^}
^{^} Shipments figures based on certification alone.
