= Your Cheatin' Heart (Hank Williams Jr. album) =

Soundtrack album by Hank Williams Jr.
- Released: October 1964
- Recorded: MGM Studios (Culver City, California)
- Genre: Country
- Length: 23:47
- Label: MGM
- Producer: Jesse Kaye; Jim Vienneau

Hank Williams Jr. chronology
Hank Williams Jr. Sings the Songs of Hank Williams (1964)	Your Cheatin' Heart (1964)	Connie Francis and Hank Williams Jr. Sing Great Country Favorites (1964)

The MGM Sound Track Album Hank Williams' Life Story: The MGM Film Your Cheatin' Heart Sung by Hank Williams Jr. (or, simply, Your Cheatin' Heart) is the second studio album and a soundtrack album by American artist Hank Williams Jr.

== Background ==
Professional ratings
Review scores
Source	Rating
AllMusic	3/5 stars
Los Angeles Times	2/4 stars

Your Cheatin' Heart is the soundtrack to the 1964 biopic of the same name of Hank Williams Sr. The original plan was to have the actor who played Williams Sr., George Hamilton, supply the vocals. After Williams Jr.'s mother and Williams Sr.'s late wife, Audrey Williams, took Williams Jr. to a studio in Nashville and recorded a few songs, she played the tapes for executives at MGM Records, who loved the tape and opted to use him for the vocals.

== Reception ==
Richie Unterberger of AllMusic gave the album three stars out of five, citing Williams Jr. as doing "a credible job, sounding older and more polished than you'd expect, considering his tender age." Robert Hilburn of the Los Angeles Times gave the album two out of four stars, praising Williams Jr. for sounding similar to his father.

== Track listing ==
All tracks written by Hank Williams, with additional co-writers as noted.

=== Side one ===
1. "Your Cheatin' Heart" – 2:04
2. "Hey, Good Lookin'" – 1:38
3. "I Saw the Light" – 1:22
4. "Jambalaya (On the Bayou)" – 1:55 (Moon Mullican)
5. "Ramblin' Man" – 1:20
6. "I'm So Lonesome I Could Cry" – 2:12

=== Side two ===
1. "Jambalaya (On the Bayou)" – 1:28 (Mullican)
2. "Cold, Cold Heart" – 2:17
3. "Kaw-Liga" – 1:05 (Fred Rose)
4. "I Can't Help It (If I'm Still in Love with You)" – 1:58
5. "Hey, Good Lookin'" – 2:41
6. "Long Gone Lonesome Blues" – 1:45
7. "You Win Again" – 2:02

== Personnel ==
- Hank Williams Jr. - vocals
- The Jordanaires - backing vocals
- Bob Moore - bass
- Buddy Harman - drums
- Harold Bradley, Ray Edenton, Jerry Kennedy, Grady Martin - guitar
- Bill Pursell, Hargus "Pig" Robbins - piano
- Pete Drake - steel guitar

Technical

- Val Valentin – director of engineering
- Frederick Karger – supervision

== Charts ==
Chart performance for Your Cheatin' Heart
Chart (1965)	Peak position
US Billboard 200	16
US Top Country Albums (Billboard)	5

== Certifications ==
Region	Certification	Certified units/sales
United States (RIAA)	Gold	500,000^{^}
^{^} Shipments figures based on certification alone.
