= Connie Francis and Hank Williams Jr. Sing Great Country Favorites =

Connie Francis and Hank Williams Jr. sing Great Country Favorites

Studio album by Connie Francis and Hank Williams Jr.
- Released: November 1964
- Recorded: May 11 – 13, 1964
- Genre: Country
- Length: 29:53
- Labels: MGM; E-4251 (mono)/SE-4251 (stereo)
- Producers: Danny Davis, Jim Vienneau

Connie Francis chronology
Looking for Love (1964)	Connie Francis and Hank Williams Jr. sing Great Country Favorites (1964)	A New Kind of Connie... (1964)

Hank Williams Jr. chronology
Your Cheatin' Heart (1964)	Connie Francis and Hank Williams Jr. Sing Great Country Favorites (1964)	Father & Son (1965)

Connie Francis and Hank Williams Jr. sing Great Country Favorites is a studio album of country duets recorded by American entertainer Connie Francis and musician Hank Williams Jr.

The album was recorded May 11–13, 1964 at Owen Bradley's studio Bradley Film & Recording in Nashville. Arrangements were provided by Bill McElhiney who also conducted the sessions. Background vocals came from Millie Kirkham and The Jordanaires.

== Track listing ==
=== Side A ===
#	Title	Songwriter	Length
1.	"Send Me the Pillow That You Dream On"	Hank Locklin	2:36
2.	"Wolverton Mountain"	Merle Kilgore, Claude King	3:01
3.	"Please Help Me, I'm Falling"	Don Robertson, Hal Blair	2:37
4.	"Singing the Blues"	Melvin Endsley	2:10
5.	"Walk on By"	Kendall Hayes, Gary Walker	2:14
6.	"If You've Got The Money (I've Got The Time)"	Lefty Frizzell, Jim Beck	2:28

=== Side B ===
#	Title	Songwriter	Length
1.	"Mule Skinner Blues"	Jimmie Rodgers, George Vaughn	2:57
2.	"Making Believe"	Jimmy Work	2:20
3.	"Blue, Blue Day"	Don Gibson	1:58
4.	"No Letter Today"	Ted Daffan	2:40
5.	"Bye Bye Love"	Boudleaux Bryant, Felice Bryant	2:29
6.	"Wabash Cannonball"	Traditional, A. P. Carter	2:23

=== Not included songs from the sessions ===
#	Title	Songwriter	Length	Remark
1.	"Mule Skinner Blues"	Jimmie Rodgers, George Vaughn	2:51	alternate version with different vocal arrangement unreleased until 1993
2.	"No Letter Today"	Ted Daffan	2:41	alternate version with different vocal arrangement unreleased until 1993
