= Devil in the Bottle =

Single by T. G. Sheppard

from the album T. G. Sheppard
- B-side: "Rollin' with the Flow"
- Released: October 1974
- Genre: Country
- Length: 2:49
- Label: Melodyland
- Songwriter(s): Bobby David
- Producer(s): Jack Gilmer, T. G. Sheppard

T. G. Sheppard singles chronology
"Devil in the Bottle" (1974)	"Tryin' to Beat the Morning Home" (1975)

"Devil in the Bottle" is a song written by Bobby David and recorded by American country music artist T. G. Sheppard. It was released in October 1974 as his debut single and the first from his album T. G. Sheppard, and reached number one on the U.S. country singles chart. The single spent a single week at number one and a total of ten weeks on the chart. The single was released on the Melodyland Label, a country music, Motown subsidiary.

== Chart performance ==
Chart (1974–1975)	Peak position
US Hot Country Songs (Billboard)	1
US Billboard Hot 100	54
Canadian RPM Country Tracks	1

== Cover versions ==
"Devil in the Bottle" was covered by Hank Williams Jr. on his 2003 album I'm One of You. It was released in 2004 as the album's third single and peaked at number 59 on the Billboard Hot Country Singles & Tracks chart.
