= Songs My Father Left Me =

Studio album by Hank Williams Jr.
- Released: February 1969
- Genre: Country
- Length: 26:27
- Label: MGM
- Producer: Jim Vienneau

Hank Williams Jr. chronology
Luke the Drifter Jr. (1969)	Songs My Father Left Me (1969)	Luke the Drifter Jr. Vol. 2 (1969)

Professional ratings
Review scores
Source	Rating
AllMusic	4.5/5 stars

Songs My Father Left Me is the eleventh studio album by American musician Hank Williams Jr. The full title is Songs My Father Left Me The Poetry of Hank Williams, set to music and sung by Hank Williams Jr. The album was issued in 1969 by MGM Records as number SE 4621.

== Track listing ==
All tracks composed by Hank Williams

=== Side One ===
1. "Cajun Baby" – 2:38
2. "For Me There Is No Place" – 2:16
3. "Is This Goodbye" – 2:05
4. "I'm Just Crying 'Cause I Care" – 2:43
5. "Your Turn to Cry" – 1:52
6. "Where Do I Go From Here" – 2:21

=== Side Two ===
1. "Are You Lonely Too" – 2:33
2. "Homesick" – 2:24
3. "Just Me and My Broken Heart" – 2:37
4. "My Heart Won't Let Me Go" – 2:15
5. "You Can't Take My Memories of You" – 2:43

== Charts ==
Chart performance for Songs My Father Left Me
Chart (1969)	Peak position
US Billboard 200	164
US Top Country Albums (Billboard)	1
