= I'm One of You =

Studio album by Hank Williams Jr.
- Released: November 18, 2003
- Genre: Country
- Length: 39:15
- Label: Curb Records
- Producer: Hank Williams Jr.; Doug Johnson

Hank Williams Jr. chronology
| The Almeria Club Recordings (2002) | I'm One of You (2003) | That's How They Do It in Dixie: The Essential Collection (2006) |

I'm One of You is the fiftieth studio album by American country music artist Hank Williams Jr. It was released on November 18, 2003 by Curb Records. A video was made for the track "Why Can't We All Just Get a Long Neck?"

== Track listing ==
| No. | Title | Writer(s) | Length |
|---|---|---|---|
| 1. | "Amos Moses" | Jerry Reed | 4:24 |
| 2. | "Liquor to Like Her" | Paul Overstreet, Tom Hernby | 2:55 |
| 3. | "Just Enough to Get in Trouble" | David Lee Murphy, Kim Tribble | 3:42 |
| 4. | "I'm One of You" | Neal Coty, Jimmy Melton | 3:28 |
| 5. | "What's on the Bar" | Hank Williams Jr. | 3:46 |
| 6. | "Games People Play" | Joe South | 3:56 |
| 7. | "Waylon's Guitar" | Williams | 3:12 |
| 8. | "Why Can't We All Just Get a Long Neck?/Jambalaya" | Richard Fagan, Micheal Smotherman, Williams, Chris Clark | 4:46 |
| 9. | "American Offline" | Tony Stampley, Tommy Barnes | 3:10 |
| 10. | "Guitar Money" | Troy Seals, Eddie Setser | 3:44 |
| 11. | "Devil in the Bottle" | Bobby David | 4:52 |

== Personnel ==
- Jimmy Bones – Hammond organ
- Kady Bopp – choir
- Bruce Bouton – lap steel guitar
- Lisa Brokop – choir
- Pat Buchanan – slide guitar
- Joe Chemay – bass guitar
- Rob Crosby – choir
- Caroline Cutbirth – choir
- Eric Darken – percussion
- Marcus Eldridge – choir
- Larry Franklin – fiddle
- Paul Franklin – pedal steel guitar
- Kristin Garner – choir
- Jimmy Hall – harmonica, saxophone
- Jennifer Hicks – choir
- Wes Hightower – background vocals
- John Hobbs – Hammond organ, keyboards
- John Barlow Jarvis – Hammond organ, piano
- Kim Keyes – background vocals
- Paul Leim – drums
- Chris Leuzinger – dobro, electric guitar
- Lauren Lucas – choir
- Ann McCrary – background vocals
- Christy McDonald – choir
- Brent Mason – electric guitar
- Chip Matthews – choir
- Joey Miskulin – accordion
- Steve Nathan – clavinet, keyboards, Hammond organ, synthesizer
- Marcia Ramirez – choir
- Jim Reilley – choir
- Brent Rowan – six-string bass guitar, 12-string electric guitar, acoustic guitar, baritone guitar, sitar, slide guitar
- Bryan Sutton – 12-string acoustic guitar, acoustic guitar
- George Tidwell – trumpet
- Hank Williams Jr. – lead vocals, background vocals
- Hilary Williams – choir
- Reggie Young – electric guitar

== Chart performance ==
| Chart (2003) | Peak position |
|---|---|
| U.S. Billboard Top Country Albums | 24 |
| U.S. Billboard 200 | 166 |
