= A Time to Sing (album) =

Soundtrack album by Hank Williams Jr.
- Released: 1968
- Genre: Country
- Length: 23:45
- Label: MGM
- Producer: Jim Vienneau

Hank Williams Jr. chronology
My Own Way (1967)	A Time to Sing (1968)	Luke the Drifter Jr. (1969)

Professional ratings
Review scores
Source	Rating
AllMusic	2.5/5 stars

A Time to Sing is the ninth studio album by American musician Hank Williams Jr. The album was issued by MGM Records as number SE 4540ST. The full title is: From The Motion Picture Sound Track Hank Williams Jr. Sings Songs From Metro-Goldwyn-Mayer's A Time To Sing. The song "Next Time I Say Goodbye I'm Leaving" is sung by Shelley Fabares.

== Track listing ==
=== Side One ===
1. "A Time to Sing" – 2:15
2. "Next Time I Say Goodbye I'm Leaving" (vocals by Shelley Fabares) – 2:26
3. "Old Before My Time" – 1:59
4. "Rock in My Shoe" – 2:08
5. "Money Can't Buy Happiness" – 1:53

=== Side Two ===
1. "A Man is on His Own" – 2:50
2. "There's Gotta Be More to Life Than You" – 2:40
3. "It's All Over But the Crying" – 2:34
4. "Give Me The Hummingbird Line" – 2:20
5. "A Time to Sing" – 2:40

== Charts ==
Chart performance for A Time to Sing
Chart (1968)	Peak position
US Billboard 200	189
US Top Country Albums (Billboard)	12
