= Lone Wolf (Hank Williams Jr. album) =

Studio album by Hank Williams Jr.
- Released: January 23, 1990
- Genre: Country
- Length: 32:35
- Label: Warner Bros./Curb
- Producers: Barry Beckett; Jim Ed Norman; Hank Williams Jr.

Hank Williams Jr. chronology
Greatest Hits, Vol. 3 (1989)	Lone Wolf (1990)	America (The Way I See It) (1990)

Singles from Lone Wolf
- 1. "Ain't Nobody's Business" Released: January 25, 1990; 2. "Good Friends, Good Whiskey, Good Lovin'" Released: May 3, 1990; 3. "I Mean I Love You" Released: January 5, 1991

Professional ratings
Review scores
Source	Rating
Allmusic	3/5 stars

Lone Wolf is the forty-second studio album by American musician Hank Williams Jr. It was released by Warner Bros./Curb Records in January 1990. "Ain't Nobody's Business," "Good Friends, Good Whiskey, Good Lovin'" and "Man to Man" were released as singles. The album peaked at number 2 on the Billboard Top Country Albums chart and has been certified Gold by the RIAA.

"The U.S.A. Today" is a cover of a George Jones song from his 1987 album, Too Wild Too Long.

== Track listing ==
No.	Title	Writer(s)	Length
1.	"Good Friends, Good Whiskey, Good Lovin'"	Hank Williams Jr.	3:03
2.	"The U.S.A. Today"	Ron Hellard, Johnny MacRae	3:18
3.	"Hot to Trot"	Williams	2:26
4.	"Big Mamou"	Clifton Chenier, Link Davis	4:48
5.	"I Mean I Love You"	Williams	2:55
6.	"Man to Man"	Tommy Barnes, Williams	2:54
7.	"Almost Persuaded"	Billy Sherrill, Glenn Sutton	3:43
8.	"Stoned at the Jukebox"	Williams	2:57
9.	"Ain't Nobody's Business"	Porter Grainger, Everett Robbins	2:40
10.	"Lone Wolf"	Williams	3:51

== Personnel ==
- Ava Aldridge – background vocals
- Eddie Bayers – drums
- Barry Beckett – keyboards
- Quitman Dennis – saxophone on "Almost Persuaded"
- Steve Gibson – banjo, electric guitar
- Dennis Good – trombone on "Hot to Trot"
- Sammy Hagar – electric guitar on "Almost Persuaded"
- Jack Hale – trombone on "Almost Persuaded"
- Mike Haynes – trumpet on "Almost Persuaded"
- Jim Horn – saxophone on "Hot to Trot" and "Almost Persuaded"
- David Hungate – bass guitar
- Roy Huskey Jr. – upright bass
- John Barlow Jarvis – keyboards
- Mike Lawler – synthesizer
- "Cowboy" Eddie Long – steel guitar
- Donna McElroy – background vocals
- Jerry McKinney – saxophone
- Carl Marsh – fairlight programming
- Edgar Meyer – upright bass
- Jimmy C. Newman - lead vocals on "Big Mamou"
- Mark O'Connor – fiddle
- Michael Rhodes – bass guitar
- Cindy Richardson Walker – background vocals
- Matt Rollings – keyboards
- Jo-El Sonnier – accordion, French accordion
- George Tidwell – trumpet on "Hot to Trot"
- Wayne Turner – electric guitar
- Billy Joe Walker Jr. – acoustic guitar, electric guitar
- Hank Williams Jr. – lead vocals
- Reggie Young – electric guitar

== Charts ==
=== Weekly charts ===
Chart (1990)	Peak position
US Billboard 200	71
US Top Country Albums (Billboard)	2

=== Year-end charts ===
Chart (1990)	Position
US Top Country Albums (Billboard)	13

== Certifications ==
Region	Certification	Certified units/sales
United States (RIAA)	Gold	500,000^{^}
^{^} Shipments figures based on certification alone.
