= The Almeria Club Recordings =

Studio album by Hank Williams Jr.
- Released: January 8, 2002
- Recorded: March and May 2001
- Genre: Country
- Length: 51:25
- Label: Curb
- Producer: Chuck Howard; Hank Williams Jr.

Hank Williams Jr. chronology
The Bocephus Box (2000)	The Almeria Club Recordings (2002)	I'm One of You (2003)

The Almeria Club Recordings is the forty-ninth studio album by the American country music artist Hank Williams Jr. It was released on January 8, 2002, by Curb Records. He recorded most of the songs at "The Almeria Club", a club where his father, Hank Williams, recorded several songs himself. Kid Rock as well as Uncle Kracker appear on the song "The 'F' Word" giving background vocals.

== Track listing ==
All tracks composed by Hank Williams Jr.; except where indicated

No.	Title	Writer(s)	Length
1.	"Last Pork Chop"	Thunderhead Hawkins	3:23
2.	"Go Girl Go"	Hank Williams Jr.; Gene Wells; Jessie Staggs	3:21
3.	"The 'F' Word" (featuring Kid Rock and Uncle Kracker)		3:21
4.	"If the Good Lord's Willin' (And the Creeks Don't Rise)"	Williams; Hank Williams	4:44
5.	"X-Treme Country"		3:07
6.	"Last Pork Chop" (Acoustic)	Hawkins	4:25
7.	"Big Top Women"		3:10
8.	"The Cheatin' Hotel"		5:12
9.	"Outdoor Lovin' Man"		4:04
10.	"Almeria Jam"		2:03
11.	"Tee Tot Song"		3:55
12.	"Cross on the Highway"		7:09
13.	"America Will Survive" (Studio Version)		4:51

== Personnel ==
Vocals

- Ira Dean – background vocals
- Kid Rock - background vocals (track 3)
- Heidi Newfield – background vocals
- Uncle Kracker – background vocals (track 3)
- Hank Williams Jr. – lead vocals

Musicians

- James Burton – electric guitar
- Ira Dean – bass guitar
- Ricky Fataar – drums
- Larry Franklin – fiddle
- Jimmy Hall – harmonica
- Steve Herman – trumpet
- Don Herron – fiddle, lap steel guitar
- John Hinchey – trombone
- Jim Horn – saxophone
- James "Hutch" Hutchinson – bass guitar, upright bass (tracks 1–13)
- Kid Rock – electric guitar
- "Cowboy" Eddie Long – steel guitar
- Heidi Newfield – harmonica
- Jimmy Nichols – keyboards
- Kenny Olson – electric guitar
- Chris Thile – mandolin
- Wayne Turner – electric guitar
- Rick Vito – acoustic guitar, dobro, electric guitar
- Sara Watkins – fiddle
- Sean Watkins – acoustic guitar
- Hank Williams Jr. – banjo, dobro
- Reese Wynans – Hammond organ, piano
- Tramp – fiddle, mandolin

== Charts ==
=== Weekly charts ===
Chart (2002)	Peak position
US Billboard 200	112
US Top Country Albums (Billboard)	9

=== Year-end charts ===
Chart (2002)	Position
US Top Country Albums (Billboard)	60
