= Eleven Roses =

Single by Hank Williams Jr.

from the album Eleven Roses
- B-side: "Richmond Valley Breeze"
- Released: March 1972
- Recorded: December 9, 1971
- Genre: Country
- Length: 2:40
- Label: MGM K 14371
- Songwriters: Lamar Morris and Darrell McCall
- Producer: Jim Vienneau

Hank Williams Jr. singles chronology
"After All, They Used to Belong to Me" (1971)	"Eleven Roses" (1972)	"Pride's Not Hard to Swallow" (1972)

"Eleven Roses" is a song written by Lamar Morris and Darrell McCall and recorded by American musician Hank Williams Jr. It was released in March 1972 as the only single and title track from the album of the same name. The song was Williams' first number one, as solo artist, on the Billboard magazine Hot Country Singles chart in July 1972, spending two weeks atop the chart. The song spent 14 weeks on the Hot Country Singles chart's top 40.

== Content ==
The song—recorded in the countrypolitan vein, and much different than Williams' later recordings—is a ballad about a man who gives his girlfriend a bouquet of 11 roses. The boyfriend, apparently repentant and remorseful for wrongs that he did to her ("after what I've done you may not keep my roses"), then asks her to look into the mirror while clutching the bouquet, hoping that she'll find that "the 12th rose will be staring back at you."

== Charts ==
Chart (1972)	Peak position
US Hot Country Songs (Billboard)	1
Canadian RPM Country Tracks	1
