= Hank Williams Jr. =

American singer-songwriter and musician (born 1949)

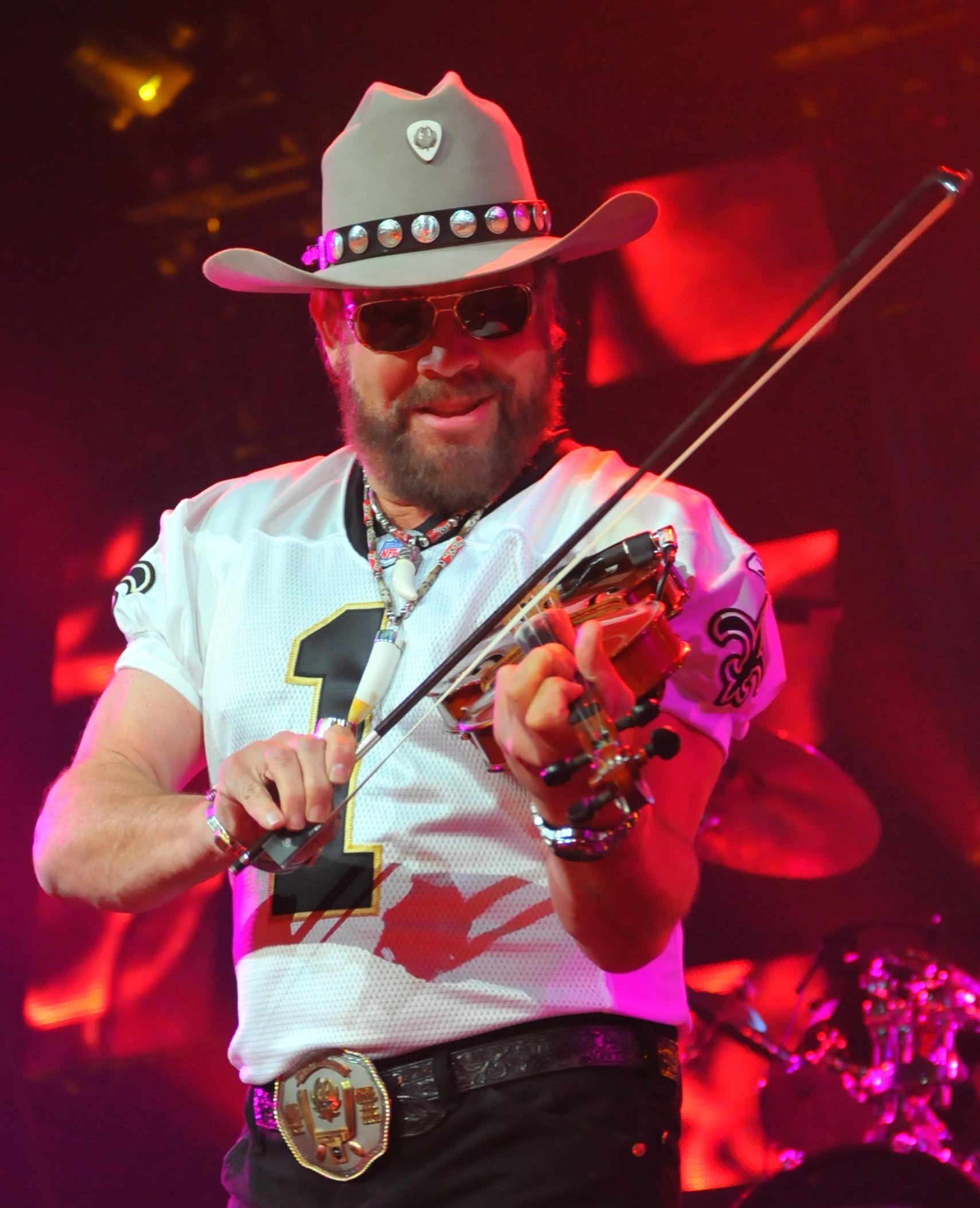
- Williams in 2008

Background information
- Born: Randall Hank Williams; May 26, 1949 (age 77); Shreveport, Louisiana, U.S.
- Genres: Country; outlaw country; country rock; blues
- Occupations: Singer-songwriter; musician
- Instruments: Vocals; guitar; banjo; piano; keyboards; harmonica; fiddle; drums
- Years active: 1957–present
- Labels: MGM; Warner Bros.; Curb; Bocephus; NASH Icon
- Spouse: Sharon Martin (m. 1969; div. 1971) Gwen Yeargin (m. 1971; div. 1977) Becky White (m. 1977; div. 1983) Mary Jane Thomas (m. 1990; died 2022) Brandi Williams (m. 2023) (Note: Brandi's maiden last name is currently unknown.)
- Website: hankjr.com
- Children: 5, including Sam Williams, Hank Williams III, and Holly Williams
- Parent(s): Hank Williams; Audrey Williams
- Relatives: Jett Williams (half-sister); Hank IV (grandson)

Randall Hank Williams (born May 26, 1949), known professionally as Hank Williams Jr. and Bocephus, is an American singer-songwriter and musician. His musical style has been described as a blend of rock, blues, and country. He is the son of country musician Hank Williams and the father of musicians Sam Williams, Holly Williams and Hank Williams III, and the grandfather of Coleman Williams. He is also the half-brother of Jett Williams.

Williams began his career following in his famed father's footsteps, covering his father's songs and imitating his father's style. Williams's first television appearance was in a December 1963 episode of The Ed Sullivan Show, in which at the age of fourteen he sang several songs associated with his father. The following year, he was a guest star on Shindig!.

As Williams struggled to define his own voice and place within the country music genre, his style began slowly to evolve. His career was interrupted by a near-fatal fall while he was climbing Ajax Peak in Montana on August 8, 1975. After an extended recovery, he rebuilt his career in both the country rock and outlaw country scenes. As a multi-instrumentalist, Williams's repertoire of musical instrument skills includes guitar, bass guitar, upright bass, steel guitar, banjo, dobro, piano, keyboards, saxophone, harmonica, fiddle, and drums. In 2020, Williams Jr. was inducted into the Country Music Hall of Fame.

== Early life ==
Randall Hank Williams was born on May 26, 1949, in Shreveport, Louisiana. His father nicknamed him Bocephus after a ventriloquist dummy used by comedian Rod Brasfield. After his father's death in 1953, Williams was raised by his mother, Audrey Williams.

While he was a child, Williams was influenced by contemporary musicians who visited his family and taught him various musical instruments and styles. Among his mentors or inspirations were Merle Haggard, Johnny Cash, Fats Domino, Earl Scruggs, Sonny Osborne, Lightnin' Hopkins, and Jerry Lee Lewis. Williams first stepped onto the stage and sang his father's songs when he was eight years old.

He attended John Overton High School in Nashville, Tennessee, where he would take his guitar to music class and play for pep rallies and performances with the choir.

== Career ==
In 1964, Williams made his recording debut with "Long Gone Lonesome Blues", one of his father's many classic songs.

He provided the singing voice of his father in the 1964 film Your Cheatin' Heart. He also recorded an album of duets with recordings of his father.

=== Career changes ===
Although Williams's recordings earned him numerous country hits throughout the 1960s and early 1970s, he became disillusioned with the feeling he was living in his father's shadow and subsequently severed ties with his mother.

By the mid-1970s Williams began to pursue a musical direction that would eventually make him a superstar. While recording a series of moderately successful songs, Williams began a pattern of heavy drug and alcohol abuse. Upon moving to Alabama, in an attempt to refocus both his creative energy and his troubled personal life, Williams began playing music with Southern rock and Outlaw country musicians including Waylon Jennings, Toy Caldwell, and Charlie Daniels. Hank Williams Jr. and Friends (1975), often considered his watershed album, was the product of these then-groundbreaking collaborations.

On August 8, 1975, Williams was seriously injured while mountain climbing in southwestern Montana. While climbing Ajax Peak on the continental divide (Idaho border) west of Jackson, the snow beneath Williams collapsed and he fell almost 500 feet (150 m) onto rock, causing multiple severe skull and facial fractures. Williams spent two years recovering, re-learning how to talk and sing, and undergoing 17 surgeries to repair his skull and reconstruct his face. The accident was chronicled in the semi-autobiographical, made-for-television film Living Proof: The Hank Williams Jr. Story. To hide his scars and disfigurement from the accident, Williams grew a beard and began wearing sunglasses and a cowboy hat.

In 1977, Williams recorded and released the albums One Night Stands and The New South, and worked closely with his old friend Waylon Jennings on the song "Once and For All". In 1980, he appeared on the PBS show Austin City Limits during Season 5, along with the Shake Russell-Dana Cooper Band.

=== Country music career ===
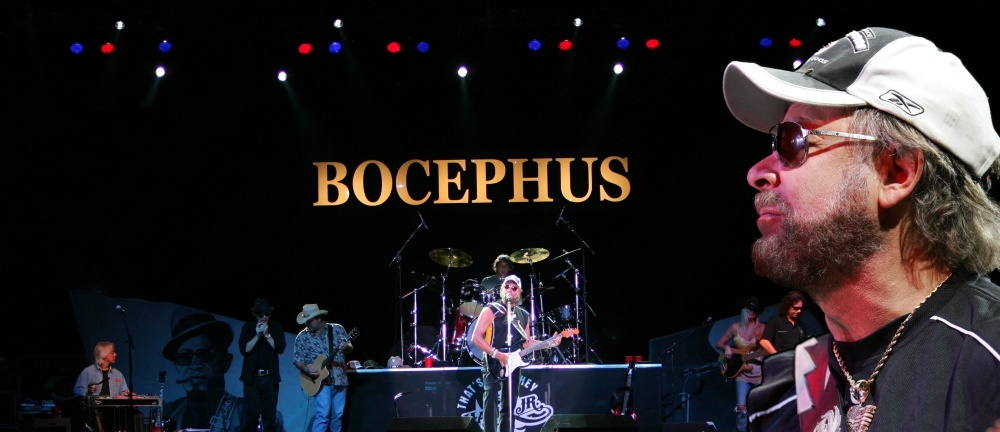
Williams performing at the Chumash Casino Resort in Santa Ynez, California, 2006

In 1976, Rolling Stone wrote that Williams's "mainstream country material has always been among Nashville's best".

He was prolific throughout the 1980s, sometimes recording and releasing two albums a year. Family Tradition, Whiskey Bent and Hell Bound, Habits Old and New, Rowdy, The Pressure Is On, High Notes, Strong Stuff, Man of Steel, Major Moves, Five-O, Montana Cafe, and many others resulted in a long string of hits.

Between 1979 and 1992, Williams released 21 albums—18 studio albums and three compilations—that were all certified at least gold by the RIAA. Between 1979 and 1990, he enjoyed a string of 30 Top Ten singles on the Billboard Country charts, including eight No. 1 singles, for a total of 44 Top Ten singles, including a total of 10 No. 1 singles, during his career.

In 1982, he had nine albums simultaneously on the Billboard Top Country Albums chart, all of which were original works and not compilations. In 1987–88, Williams was named Entertainer of the Year by the Country Music Association. In 1987, 1988, and 1989, he won the same award from the Academy of Country Music. The pinnacle album of his acceptance and popularity was Born to Boogie.

During the 1980s, Williams Jr. became a country music superstar known for catchy anthems and hard-edged, rock-influenced country. During the late 1970s and into the mid-1980s, Williams's songs constantly flew into the number one or number two spots, with songs such as "Family Tradition", "Whiskey Bent and Hell Bound", "Old Habits", "Ain't Misbehavin'", "Born to Boogie", and "My Name Is Bocephus".

The hit single "Wild Streak" (1987) was co-written by Houston native Terri Sharp, for which Williams and Sharp both earned gold records. In 1988, he released a Southern pride song, "If the South Woulda Won". The reference is to a notional Southern victory in the Civil War.

His 1989 hit "There's a Tear in My Beer" was a duet with his father created using electronic merging technology. The song was written by his father, and had been previously recorded with Hank Williams playing the guitar as the sole instrument. The music video for the song combined existing television footage of Hank Williams performing, onto which electronic merging technology impressed the recordings of Williams, which then made it appear as if he were actually playing with his father. The video was both a critical and commercial success. It was named Video of the Year by both the Country Music Association and the Academy of Country Music. Williams would go on to win a Grammy Award in 1990 for Best Country Vocal Collaboration.

He is well known for his hit "A Country Boy Can Survive" and as the performer of the theme song for Monday Night Football, based on his 1984 hit "All My Rowdy Friends Are Coming Over Tonight". In 1991, 1992, 1993, and 1994, Williams's opening themes for Monday Night Football earned him four Emmy Awards.

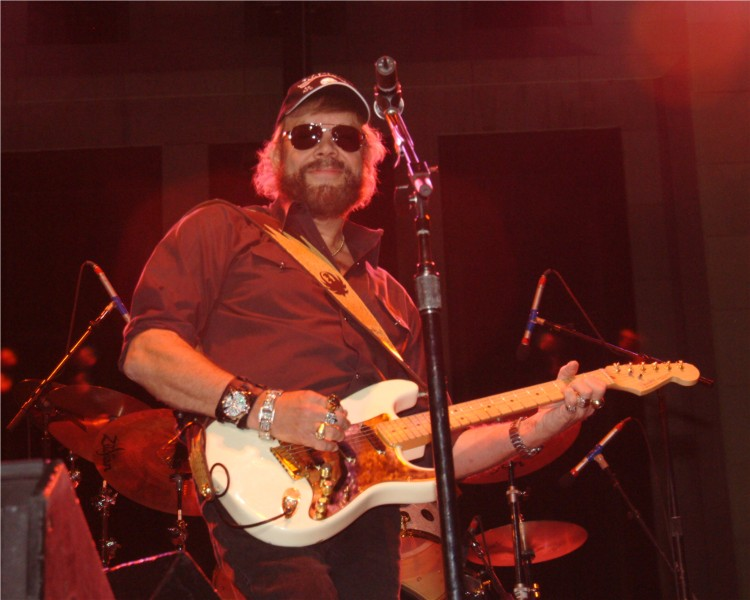
Williams in 2006

In 2000, he provided the voice of Injun Joe in Tom Sawyer. In 2001, Williams Jr. co-wrote his classic hit "A Country Boy Can Survive" after 9/11, renaming it "America Can Survive". In 2004, Williams was featured prominently on CMT Outlaws. In 2006, he starred at the Summerfest concert.

He has also made a cameo appearance along with Larry the Cable Guy, Kid Rock, and Charlie Daniels in Gretchen Wilson's music video for the song "All Jacked Up". He and Kid Rock also appeared in Wilson's "Redneck Woman" video. Hank also had a small part of Kid Rock's video "Only God Knows Why", and "Redneck Paradise".

In April 2009, Williams released a new single, "Red, White & Pink-Slip Blues", which peaked at number 43 on the country charts. The song was the lead-off single to Williams's album 127 Rose Avenue. The album debuted and peaked at number 7 on the Billboard Top Country Albums chart. Also in July 2009, 127 Rose Avenue was announced as his last album for Curb Records.

== Musical style ==
As a multi-instrumentalist, Williams's repertoire of skills includes guitar, bass guitar, upright bass, steel guitar, banjo, Resonator guitar, piano, keyboards, saxophone, harmonica, fiddle, and drums. Williams began his recording career performing covers of his father's songs. Despite catering to the country music market, Williams preferred to listen to rhythm and blues. Williams also recorded singles under the name Luke the Drifter Jr. (a reference to his father's alias "Luke the Drifter"), rock and roll singles under the aliases Rockin' Randall and Bocephus (a nickname given to him by his father), and blues under the name Thunderhead Hawkins. Williams's music has been categorized as country rock, blues rock, southern rock, outlaw country, rockabilly and rock and roll.

== Legacy ==
Artists who have cited Hank Williams Jr. as an influence include Delta Generators,Blake Shelton, Justin Moore, Gavin Adcock, Davin James, Shooter Jennings, Wayne Mills, The Sickstring Outlaws and Gretchen Wilson.

On April 10, 2006, CMT honored Williams with the Johnny Cash Visionary Award, presenting it to him at the 2006 CMT Music Awards. On November 11, 2008, Williams was honored as a BMI Icon at the 56th annual BMI Country Awards. The artists and songwriters named BMI Icons have had "a unique and indelible influence on generations of music makers".

In 2015, Williams was inducted into the Louisiana Music Hall of Fame. On August 12, 2020, Williams was selected to be inducted into the Country Music Hall of Fame.

== Personal life ==
Williams has been married five times and has five children, four of whom worked as professional musicians.

His first wife was Sharon Martin (1969–1971). His second wife was Gwen Yeargain (1971–1977); they had one son Shelton Hank Williams (born 1972), who is professionally known as Hank Williams III. His third wife was Becky White (1977–1983); they had two daughters: Hilary Williams (born 1979) and Holly Williams (born 1981). His fourth wife was Mary Jane Thomas (married 1990–2022); they had two children: Katherine “Katie” Williams-Dunning (born 1993; died 2020) and Sam Williams (born 1997). Mary Jane died of complications following a medical procedure at age 58. His fifth wife is Brandi Williams (married 2023–present); she has three children from a previous marriage. They were longtime friends before marrying.

His daughter Katherine Williams-Dunning owned a small clothing design company. She died in an auto crash on June 13, 2020, at age 27. Her husband was also in the vehicle and was injured but survived.

His grandson Coleman Williams (Hank III's son), is also a musician who performs under the sobriquet "IV".

== Politics ==
Williams is a registered Republican and has been politically involved with the party for decades. In the 2000 U.S. presidential election, he rerecorded his song "We Are Young Country" to "This is Bush-Cheney Country". On October 15, 2008, at a rally in Virginia Beach for Republican presidential nominee John McCain, he performed "McCain-Palin Tradition", a song in support of McCain and his running mate, Sarah Palin. He has contributed to federal election campaigns, mostly to Republicans, including Michele Bachmann's 2012 presidential campaign. However, he has donated to some Democrats in the past, most notably Jim Cooper and John S. Tanner.

In November 2008, Williams considered a run for the 2012 Republican nomination as a U.S. Senator from Tennessee for the seat held by GOP incumbent Bob Corker. Williams ultimately decided against it.

Williams declined to endorse a candidate in the 2016 Republican primary. However, he has since voiced support for Donald Trump, and attended an Alabama Crimson Tide football game alongside Trump and Kid Rock in September 2024.

=== 2011 Fox and Friends controversy ===
In an October 3, 2011, interview with Fox News Channel's Fox & Friends, Williams discussed a June golf game where President Barack Obama and Republican House Speaker John Boehner had teamed against Vice President Joe Biden and Ohio Governor John Kasich, saying the match was "one of the biggest political mistakes ever". When asked why the golf game troubled him, Williams stated, "Come on. That'd be like Hitler playing golf with Netanyahu ... in the shape this country is in?" He also said Obama and Biden were "the enemy" and compared them to "the Three Stooges". Later, anchor Gretchen Carlson said to him, "You used the name of one of the most hated people in all of the world to describe, I think, the president." Williams replied, "Well, that is true. But I'm telling you like it is."

As a result of his statements, ESPN dropped Williams's opening song from its Monday Night Football broadcast of the Tampa Bay Buccaneers versus the Indianapolis Colts, and replaced it with Ken Block and Andrew Copeland of Sister Hazel singing the national anthem.

Williams later said his analogy on Fox News was "extreme – but it was to make a point". Additionally, Williams said he has "always respected the office of the president" but felt the golf game showed indifference to the plight of regular Americans. ESPN later said it was "extremely disappointed" in Williams's comments, and pulled his opening from that night's broadcast.

Three days later, ESPN announced Williams and his song would not return to Monday Night Football, ending the use of the song that had been part of the broadcast on both ABC and ESPN since 1989. Williams expressed defiance and indifference on his website, and said he was the one who had made the decision to remove his song from the sports broadcasts. Williams's son, Hank Williams III, stayed neutral in the debate, telling TMZ.com that most musicians, including his father, are "not worthy" of a political discussion.

After his song was pulled from Monday Night Football, Williams recorded a song criticizing Obama, ESPN and Fox & Friends, titled "Keep the Change". He released the track on iTunes and via free download at his website. There were over 180,000 downloads in two days.

Williams continued to make his opinions of Obama known and during a performance at the Iowa State Fair in August 2012, he called Obama a Muslim telling the crowd, "We've got a Muslim president who hates farming, hates the military, hates the U.S. and we hate him!"

== Discography ==
- Hank Williams Jr. Sings the Songs of Hank Williams (1964)
- Your Cheatin' Heart (1964)
- Connie Francis and Hank Williams Jr. Sing Great Country Favorites (1964)
- Ballads of the Hills and Plains (1965)
- Blues My Name (1965)
- Country Shadows (1966)
- A Time to Sing (1967)
- My Own Way (1967)
- My Songs (1967)
- Luke the Drifter Jr. (1968)
- Songs My Father Left Me (1969)
- Luke the Drifter Jr. – Vol. 2 (1969)
- Live at Cobo Hall (1969)
- Sunday Morning (1969)
- Removing the Shadow (1970)
- Luke the Drifter Jr. Vol. 3 (1970)
- Singing My Songs: Johnny Cash (1970)
- I've Got a Right to Cry (1971)
- Sweet Dreams (1971)
- All for the Love of Sunshine (1971)
- Whole Lotta Loving (1972)
- Eleven Roses (1972)
- After You, Pride's Not Hard to Swallow (1973)
- Living Proof (1974)
- The Last Love Song (1974)
- Bocephus (1975)
- Hank Williams Jr. and Friends (1975)
- One Night Stands (1977)
- The New South (1977)
- Family Tradition (1979)
- Whiskey Bent and Hell Bound (1979)
- Habits Old and New (1980)
- Rowdy (1981)
- The Pressure Is On (1981)
- High Notes (1982)
- Strong Stuff (1983)
- Man of Steel (1983)
- Major Moves (1984)
- Five-O (1985)
- Montana Cafe (1986)
- Hank Live (1987)
- Born to Boogie (1987)
- Wild Streak (1988)
- Lone Wolf (1990)
- Pure Hank (1991)
- Maverick (1992)
- Out of Left Field (1993)
- Hog Wild (1995)
- A.K.A. Wham Bam Sam (1996)
- Three Hanks: Men with Broken Hearts (1996)
- Stormy (1999)
- The Almeria Club Recordings (2002)
- I'm One of You (2003)
- 127 Rose Avenue (2009)
- Old School New Rules (2012)
- It's About Time (2016)
- Rich White Honky Blues (2022)

== Awards and nominations ==
Year	Award	Award
2020	Country Music Hall of Fame Inductee	Country Music Hall of Fame and Museum
2017	No. 50 in Rolling Stone's 100 Greatest Country Artists of All Time	Rolling Stone
2007	Nashville Songwriters Hall of Fame Inductee	Nashville Songwriters Hall of Fame
2007	Tennessean of the Year	Tennessee Sports Hall of Fame
2006	Johnny Cash Visionary Award	CMT Music Awards
2003	No. 20 in CMT's 40 Greatest Men of Country Music	CMT
1996	Top Vocal Duo of the Year nomination with Hank Williams III	Academy of Country Music
1994	Composed Theme	Emmy
1993	Composed Theme	Emmy
1992	Composed Theme	Emmy
1991	Composed Theme	Emmy
1990	Video of the Year – There's a Tear in My Beer	TNN/Music City News
1990	Vocal Collaboration of the Year – There's a Tear in My Beer	TNN/Music City News
1989	Top Vocal Duo of the Year nomination with Hank Williams	Academy of Country Music
1989	Video of the Year – There's a Tear in My Beer	Academy of Country Music
1989	Song of the Year nomination – There's a Tear in My Beer	Academy of Country Music
1989	Single Record of the Year nomination – There's a Tear in My Beer	Academy of Country Music
1989	Entertainer of the Year	Academy of Country Music
1989	Music Video of the Year – There's a Tear in My Beer	Country Music Association
1989	Vocal Event of the Year – There's a Tear in My Beer	Country Music Association
1989	Grammy Award for Best Country Collaboration with Vocals – There's a Tear in My Beer	Grammy Awards
1988	Entertainer of the Year	Academy of Country Music
1988	Video of the Year – Young Country	Academy of Country Music
1988	Top Male Vocalist nomination	Academy of Country Music
1988	Male Vocalist of the Year nomination	Country Music Association
1988	Album of the Year – Born to Boogie	Country Music Association
1988	Entertainer of the Year	Country Music Association
1988	Grammy Award for Best Country Vocal Performance, Male nomination – Born to Boogie	Grammy Awards
1987	Top Male Vocalist nomination	Academy of Country Music
1987	Song of the Year nomination – Born to Boogie	Academy of Country Music
1987	Single Record of the Year nomination – Born to Boogie	Academy of Country Music
1987	Entertainer of the Year	Academy of Country Music
1987	Album of the Year nomination – Born to Boogie	Academy of Country Music
1987	Entertainer of the Year	Country Music Association
1987	Music Video of the Year – My Name Is Bocephus	Country Music Association
1987	Male Vocalist of the Year nomination	Country Music Association
1987	Grammy Award for Best Country Vocal Performance, Male nomination – Ain't Misbehavin	Grammy Awards
1986	Top Male Vocalist nomination	Academy of Country Music
1986	Entertainer of the Year nomination	Academy of Country Music
1986	Male Vocalist of the Year nomination	Country Music Association
1985	Music Video of the Year – All My Rowdy Friends Are Coming Over Tonight	Country Music Association
1985	Male Vocalist of the Year nomination	Country Music Association
1985	Top Male Vocalist nomination	Academy of Country Music
1985	Single Record of the Year nomination – I'm for Love	Academy of Country Music
1985	Entertainer of the Year nomination	Academy of Country Music
1985	Album of the Year nomination – Five-O	Academy of Country Music
1985	Grammy Award for Best Country Vocal Performance, Male nomination – All My Rowdy Friends Are Coming Over Tonight	Grammy Awards
1985	Grammy Award for Best Country Song nomination – All My Rowdy Friends Are Coming Over Tonight	Grammy Awards
1984	Video of the Year – All My Rowdy Friends Are Coming Over Tonight	Academy of Country Music
1984	Album of the Year nomination – Man of Steel	Academy of Country Music
1984	Entertainer of the Year nomination	Academy of Country Music
1983	Entertainer of the Year nomination	Academy of Country Music
1982	Top Male Vocalist nomination	Academy of Country Music
1981	Top Male Vocalist nomination	Academy of Country Music
1980	Grammy Award for Best Country Vocal Performance, Male nomination – Family Tradition	Grammy Awards
1966	Grammy Award for Best Country & Western Album nomination – Father and son: Hank Williams and Hank Williams Jr.	Grammy Awards
1965	Grammy Award for Best Country & Western Album nomination – Hank Williams Jr. Sings the Songs of Hank Williams	Grammy Awards
