= Greatest Hits, Vol. 3 (Hank Williams Jr. album) =

Compilation album by Hank Williams Jr.

Hank Williams Jr.'s Greatest Hits, Vol. 3

Greatest hits album by Hank Williams Jr.
- Released: February 1989
- Length: 35:59
- Label: Warner Bros.
- Producer: Barry Beckett; Jimmy Bowen; Jim Ed Norman; Hank Williams Jr.

Hank Williams Jr. chronology
Wild Streak (1988)	Hank Williams Jr.'s Greatest Hits, Vol. 3 (1989)	Lone Wolf (1990)

Professional ratings
Review scores
Source	Rating
Allmusic	4.5/5 stars

Hank Williams Jr.'s Greatest Hits, Vol. 3 is a compilation album by American musician Hank Williams Jr. released by Warner Bros. Records in February 1989. The album includes eleven tracks, eight of which were Number One and Top 10 singles on the Billboard Hot Country Singles & Tracks chart released on the studio albums Five-O, Montana Cafe and Born to Boogie. The song "My Name Is Bocephus" was originally a track recorded for Montana Cafe, but Williams later recorded a live version of the song and included it on the live album, Hank Live. The live version was the one used for the compilation. The album included two original singles, "There's a Tear in My Beer" and "Finders Are Keepers", that peaked at number 7 and number 6 respectively on the Billboard Hot Country Singles & Tracks chart.

== Critical and commercial success ==
As with Greatest Hits, Vol. 1 and Greatest Hits, Vol. 2, this compilation proved to be both a commercial and critical success for Williams. It reached Number One on the Billboard Top Country Albums chart, giving Williams his ninth Number One career album. It is also Williams eighth career album to be certified at least Platinum by the RIAA. "There's a Tear in My Beer" in particular enjoyed great success. Using sophisticated editing technology, a music video was created in which it appeared as though Williams was singing with his father, Hank Williams, Sr., who died on January 1, 1953. Williams won his only Grammy Award for this performance, winning for Best Country Vocal Collaboration, an award that's also officially recognized as being shared by his late father. The video for the song won both the Country Music Association Music Video of the Year and Academy of Country Music Video of the Year awards. It also received nominations for ACM Single Record of the Year and ACM Song of the Year.

== Track listing ==
All songs written by Hank Williams Jr. except where noted.

No.	Title	Writer(s)	Length
1.	"I'm for Love"		2:52
2.	"This Ain't Dallas"		2:43
3.	"Ain't Misbehavin'"	Fats Waller, Andy Razaf, Harry Brooks	4:34
4.	"Country State of Mind"	Williams Jr., Roger Alan Wade	3:40
5.	"Mind Your Own Business" (guest vocals by Reba McEntire, Willie Nelson, Tom Petty and Reverend Ike)	Hank Williams	2:28
6.	"My Name Is Bocephus" (live recording)		3:46
7.	"Born to Boogie"		2:42
8.	"Young Country" (guest vocals by Butch Baker, T. Graham Brown, Steve Earle, Highway 101, Dana McVicker, Marty Stuart and Keith Whitley)		3:29
9.	"Heaven Can't Be Found"		3:11
10.	"Finders Are Keepers"		3:41
11.	"There's a Tear in My Beer" (duet with Hank Williams)	Williams Sr.	2:53

== Charts ==
=== Weekly charts ===
Chart (1989)	Peak position
Canadian Country Albums (RPM)	2
US Billboard 200	61
US Top Country Albums (Billboard)	1

=== Year-end charts ===
Chart (1989)	Position
US Top Country Albums (Billboard)	4
Chart (1990)	Position
US Top Country Albums (Billboard)	17

== Certifications ==
Region	Certification	Certified units/sales
Canada (Music Canada)	Platinum	100,000^{^}
United States (RIAA)	Platinum	1,000,000^{^}
^{^} Shipments figures based on certification alone.
