= 23rd Academy of Country Music Awards =

US music awards ceremony in 1988

- Date: March 21, 1988
- Location: Knott's Berry Farm, Buena Park, California
- Hosted by: Reba McEntire; Hank Williams Jr.

Highlights
- Most wins: Randy Travis (3)
- Most nominations: Randy Travis; Hank Williams Jr. (6 each)

Television/radio coverage
- Network: NBC

The 23rd Academy of Country Music Awards ceremony was held on March 21, 1988, at Knott's Berry Farm, Buena Park, California, United States. It was hosted by Reba McEntire and Hank Williams Jr.. This would be the last ACM Awards show to be held at Knott's Berry Farm.

== Winners and nominees ==
Winners are shown in bold.

Entertainer of the Year	Album of the Year
**Hank Williams Jr.**; Alabama; Reba McEntire; Willie Nelson; Randy Travis	**Trio — Dolly Parton, Emmylou Harris, & Linda Ronstadt**; Always & Forever — Randy Travis; Born to Boogie — Hank Williams Jr.; Heartland — The Judds; Ocean Front Property — George Strait
Top Female Vocalist of the Year	Top Male Vocalist of the Year
**Reba McEntire**; Rosanne Cash; Crystal Gayle; Kathy Mattea; Tanya Tucker	**Randy Travis**; Ronnie Milsap; George Strait; Steve Wariner; Hank Williams Jr.
Top Vocal Group of the Year	Top Vocal Duo of the Year
**Highway 101**; Alabama; Exile; Oak Ridge Boys; Restless Heart	**The Judds**; Bellamy Brothers; Foster & Lloyd; Crystal Gayle and Gary Morris; Sweethearts of the Rodeo
Single Record of the Year	Song of the Year
**"Forever and Ever, Amen"** — **Randy Travis**; "All My Ex's Live in Texas" — George Strait; "Born to Boogie" — Hank Williams Jr.; "I'll Still Be Loving You" — Restless Heart; "Somebody Lied" — Ricky Van Shelton	**"Forever and Ever, Amen"** — **Paul Overstreet, Don Schlitz**; "80's Ladies" — K.T. Oslin; "Born to Boogie" — Hank Williams Jr.; "Ocean Front Property" — Dean Dillon, Hank Cochran, Royce Porter; "Somebody Lied" — Larry Jenkins, Joe Chambers
Top New Male Vocalist	Top New Female Vocalist
**Ricky Van Shelton**; Larry Boone; Marty Haggard; Lyle Lovett; Jo-El Sonnier	**K.T. Oslin**; Nanci Griffith; Libby Hurley; k.d lang; Dana McVicker
Video of the Year
**"80's Ladies"** — **K.T. Oslin**; "Forever and Ever, Amen" — Randy Travis; "Little Sister" — Dwight Yoakam; "My Name is Bocephus" — Hank Williams Jr.; "Santa Fe" — The Bellamy Brothers; "Tar Top" — Alabama
Pioneer Award
**Roger Miller**

== Performers ==
Performer(s)	Song(s)
Hank Williams Jr.	Medley "Born to Boogie" "All My Rowdy Friends Are Coming Over Tonight"
Larry Boone; K.T. Oslin	New Artist Medley #1 "You Don't Know Me" "I Saw the Light"
Tanya Tucker	"If It Don't Come Easy"
Dwight Yoakam; Buck Owens	"Streets of Bakersfield"
Restless Heart	"Hummingbird"
Nanci Griffith; Jo-El Sonnier	New Artist Medley #2 "The Pill" "Jambalaya (On the Bayou)"
The Judds	"Old Pictures"
Merle Haggard	"Twinkle, Twinkle Lucky Star"
Dana McVicker; Marty Haggard	New Artist Medley #3 "I'm Sorry" "I Love You a Thousand Ways"
Moe Bandy	"Americana"
Reba McEntire	"A Sunday Kind of Love"
k.d. lang Ricky Van Shelton	New Artist Medley #4 "Life's Railway to Heaven" "I Can't Help It (If I'm Still in Love with You)"
Alabama	"Fallin' Again"
Lyle Lovett; Libby Hurley	New Artist Medley #5 "Stand by Your Man" "Right or Wrong"
Hank Williams Jr. Reba McEntire	"Hey, Good Lookin'"

== Presenters ==
Presenter(s)	Notes
Randy Travis; Ann Jillian	Top Vocal Duo of the Year
Marie Osmond; Robert Conrad	Single Record of the Year
Eddie Rabbitt; Stepfanie Kramer	Video of the Year
Mickey Gilley; Jessica Walter	Top Female Vocalist of the Year
Steve Wariner; Markie Post; Charley Pride	Song of the Year
Holly Dunn; John Davidson; Kathy Mattea	Top Vocal Group of the Year
Roy Clark	Presented Pioneer Award to Roger Miller
The Bellamy Brothers; Sandy Duncan	Top Male Vocalist of the Year
Sweethearts of the Rodeo; Exile	Top New Male Vocalist; Top New Female Vocalist
T.G. Sheppard; Deidre Hall; Earl Thomas Conley	Album of the Year
Carl Perkins	Entertainer of the Year
