= Born to Boogie =

Born to Boogie may refer to:

- Born to Boogie (film), a 1972 British film of a concert starring T. Rex, Marc Bolan, Ringo Starr and Elton John
- Born to Boogie, a song by T. Rex from the album Tanx
- Born to Boogie (album), a 1987 album by Hank Williams Jr.
- Born to Boogie (song), a 1987 single by Hank Williams Jr.
