= Countryfied (Hank Williams song) =

Song by Big Bill Lister
- Released: 1951
- Recorded: April 24, 1951
- Genre: Country
- Length: 2:33
- Label: MGM
- Songwriter(s): Hank Williams

"Countryfied" is a song written by Hank Williams. It was recorded and released by Big Bill Lister in 1951.

== Background ==
For several years in the 1950s, Big Bill lister (born Weldon E. Lister) traveled with Williams as the opening act for the country star and his Drifting Cowboys. As a regular performer on the Grand Ole Opry, Lister worked with most of the stars of the day, including Little Jimmy Dickens, String Bean, Minnie Pearl, Del Wood, The Carter Family, and others. He was also a recording artist for both Everstate and Capitol Records. He is probably best known for his ties to Williams' song "There's a Tear in My Beer." Lister recorded the song in the 1950s, after Williams gave him a demo recording. Years later, after Lister's wife found the old demo recording in their attic, Lister gave the recording to Williams' son, Hank Williams, Jr. Junior went on to record an overdubbed version of the song in 1988, in which (late) father and son sang together, some 40 years apart. That recording won a Grammy Award and a Country Music Association (CMA) Award in 1989. Hank Williams first pitched "Countryfied" to Lister in April 1951. Melodically, it is identical to Hank's own hit "Howlin' at the Moon," which may account for why he did not record it himself. Lister would also record the Williams composition "The Little House We Built (Just o'er the Hill)."
