= Bayou Pon Pon =

1951 song by Jimmie Davis and Hank Williams

Song by Jimmie Davis
- Published: December 19, 1951 Acuff-Rose Publications
- Released: November 1951
- Recorded: October 14, 1951
- Genre: Country
- Length: 2:37
- Label: Decca
- Songwriters: Hank Williams, Jimmie Davis

"Bayou Pon Pon" is a song by Jimmie Davis. Davis composed it with Hank Williams.

== Background ==
Williams and Davis' most successful collaboration would be "(I Heard That) Lonesome Whistle," which would rise to #8 for Williams on the country singles chart in 1951. Davis would also record another song that he wrote with Williams called "Forever is a Long, Long Time." Just about all of the songs Williams pitched to other artists were flops on the charts, including "I Can't Escape from You" by Ray Price, "Countyfied" and "The Little House We Built (Just o'er the Hill)" by Big Bill Lister, "A Stranger in the Night" by George Morgan, and "Me and My Broken Heart" by Carl Smith. The prolific Williams, who peddled songs throughout his recording career, possessed a savvy instinct for knowing which songs to keep for himself.
