= The Little House We Built (Just o'er the Hill) =

Song by Big Bill Lister
- Released: 1951
- Recorded: April 24, 1951
- Genre: Country
- Label: MGM
- Songwriter(s): Hank Williams, Don Helms

"The Little House We Built (Just o'er the Hill)" is a song written by Hank Williams and steel guitarist Don Helms. It was recorded and released by honky tonk singer Big Bill Lister in 1951.

== Background ==
Lister, who opened for Williams and his Drifting Cowboys, also recorded Hank's "There's a Tear in My Beer" and "Countryfied." "Little House We Built" is only one of two songs Williams wrote with Drifting Cowboy Don Helms (the other being "I Lost the Only Love I Knew"). Helms played and recorded with the country star from 1950 until the singer's death in 1953. Bill Lloyd, the curator of stringed instruments at the Country Music Hall of Fame and Museum, said of Helms: “After the great tunes and Hank’s mournful voice, the next thing you think about in those songs is the steel guitar. It is the quintessential honky-tonk steel sound — tuneful, aggressive, full of attitude.” A legendary musician in his own right, Helms led the Drifting Cowboys as they played during Hank's funeral in Montgomery in front of an estimated 2,700 mourners, later recalling, "It was the eeriest thing I ever had to do in my life. I had to stand up there and play with Hank's coffin right below me. I can never explain how I felt playing his songs for somebody else the way I played for him with him laying in his coffin."
