= Early in the Morning and Late at Night =

Single by Hank Williams Jr.

from the album Wild Streak
- B-side: "I'm Just a Man"
- Released: November 5, 1988
- Genre: Country
- Length: 2:29
- Label: Warner Bros./Curb
- Songwriter(s): Troy Seals, Frank J. Myers
- Producer(s): Barry Beckett, Hank Williams Jr., Jim Ed Norman

Hank Williams Jr. singles chronology
"That Old Wheel" (1988)	"Early in the Morning and Late at Night" (1988)	"There's a Tear in My Beer" (1989)

"Early in the Morning and Late at Night" is a song written by Troy Seals and Frank J. Myers, and recorded by American country music artist Hank Williams Jr. It was released in November 1988 as the second single from the album Wild Streak. The song reached #14 on the Billboard Hot Country Singles & Tracks chart.

== Chart performance ==
Chart (1988–1989)	Peak position
US Hot Country Songs (Billboard)	14
