= If the South Woulda Won =

1988 single by Hank Williams Jr.

Single by Hank Williams Jr.

from the album Wild Streak
- B-side: "Wild Streak"
- Released: July 1988
- Genre: Country
- Length: 3:19
- Label: Warner Bros./Curb
- Songwriter(s): Hank Williams Jr.
- Producer(s): Barry Beckett, Hank Williams Jr., Jim Ed Norman

Hank Williams Jr. singles chronology
"Young Country" (1988)	"If the South Woulda Won" (1988)	"That Old Wheel" (1988)

"If the South Woulda Won" is a song written and recorded by American musician Hank Williams Jr. It was released in July 1988 as the first single from the album Wild Streak. The song reached number 8 on the Billboard Hot Country Singles & Tracks chart.

== Content ==
The song is about what Williams Jr. would have done as President of the southern States had the South won the Civil War. He mentions all the states from the Confederacy as well as Kentucky and includes how he would make Elvis Presley's, Patsy Cline's, and Lynyrd Skynyrd's deaths national holidays.

"If the South Woulda Won" quotes the folk anthem, "Dixie" in the refrain. At that juncture, Williams considers running for president of the southern states.

== List of States mentioned/changes ==
State	What Hank Williams Jr. Would Do as President
Texas	Move the Supreme Court there; hasten executions of murderers
Louisiana	Teach citizens Cajun cooking
Alabama	Move the national capital to Montgomery
Florida	Take control of Miami, put all drug dealers in jail
Tennessee	Have all whiskey made there
Kentucky	Have all horses raised in the hills
Mississippi	Move the National Treasury to Tupelo, and put his father on $100 bills
North Carolina and South Carolina	Have all cars manufactured there, while banning ones made in China
Georgia	Send all women there to learn how to speak with a Southern accent and smile in an inviting manner
Virginia	Have all fiddles made there
Arkansas	Drink some wine with Clifton Clowers on Wolverton Mountain

== Chart performance ==
Chart (1988)	Peak position
US Hot Country Songs (Billboard)	8
Canadian RPM Country Tracks	22
