= List of Top Country Albums number ones of 1989 =

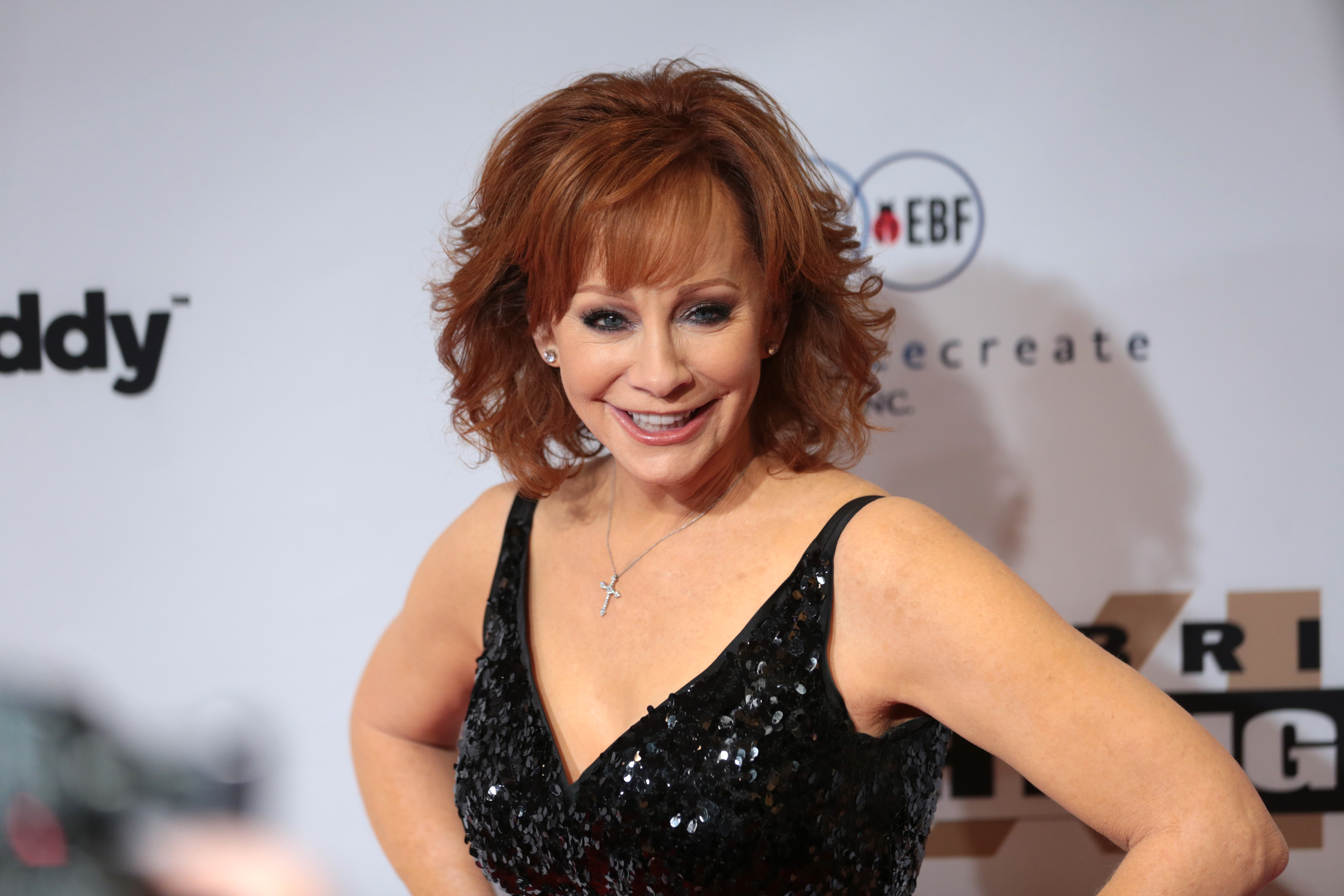
Reba McEntire spent 13 weeks at number one with her album Sweet Sixteen.

Top Country Albums is a chart that ranks the top-performing country music albums in the United States, published by Billboard. In 1989, eight different albums topped the chart, based on sales reports submitted by a representative sample of stores nationwide.

In the issue of Billboard dated January 7, Randy Travis returned to number one with Old 8×10, displacing the final chart-topper of 1988, Loving Proof by Ricky Van Shelton. Travis's album spent eight consecutive weeks in the top spot, having already spent the same length of time at number one in the fall of 1988. Travis would return to the top of the chart in November with No Holdin' Back, which spent the final nine weeks of 1989 at number one; he was the only act with more than one chart-topper during the year and his total of 17 weeks at number one was the most by any act during 1989. The longest unbroken run atop the listing was achieved by Reba McEntire, whose album Sweet Sixteen was in the top spot for 13 consecutive weeks beginning in June.

In September, Clint Black topped the chart for the first time with his debut album Killin' Time. It would spend six consecutive weeks at number one before being displaced from the top spot by Randy Travis's No Holdin' Back, but would return to the top spot in 1990 and add a further 25 weeks to its total, making it the second longest-running Top Country Albums number one to date. Having signed his first major-label record deal in 1988, Black almost immediately experienced great success, topping the country singles and albums charts and winning a string of major awards; he is seen as one of the first in a new generation of country artists who brought greatly-increased mainstream popularity to the genre in the 1990s.

== Chart history ==
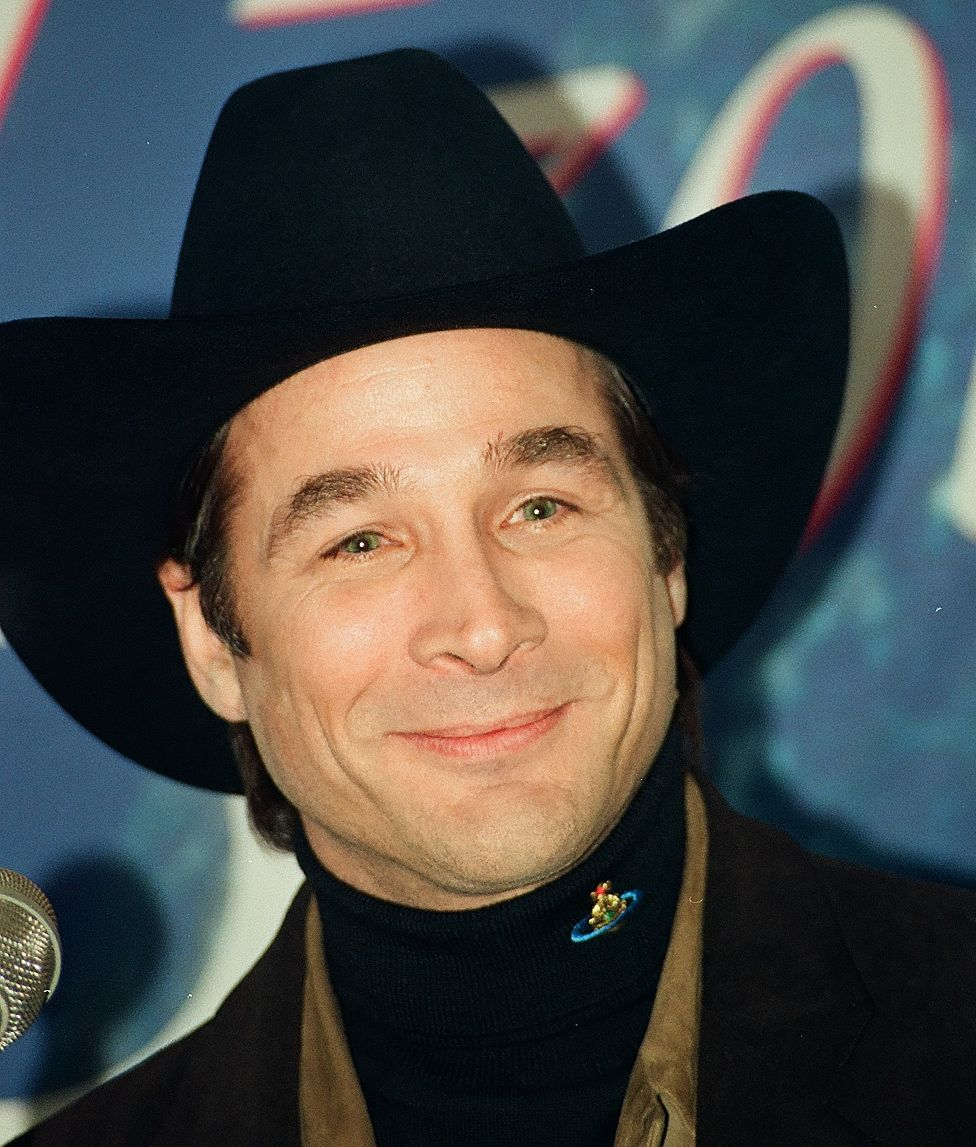
Killin' Time was the first number one for Clint Black.

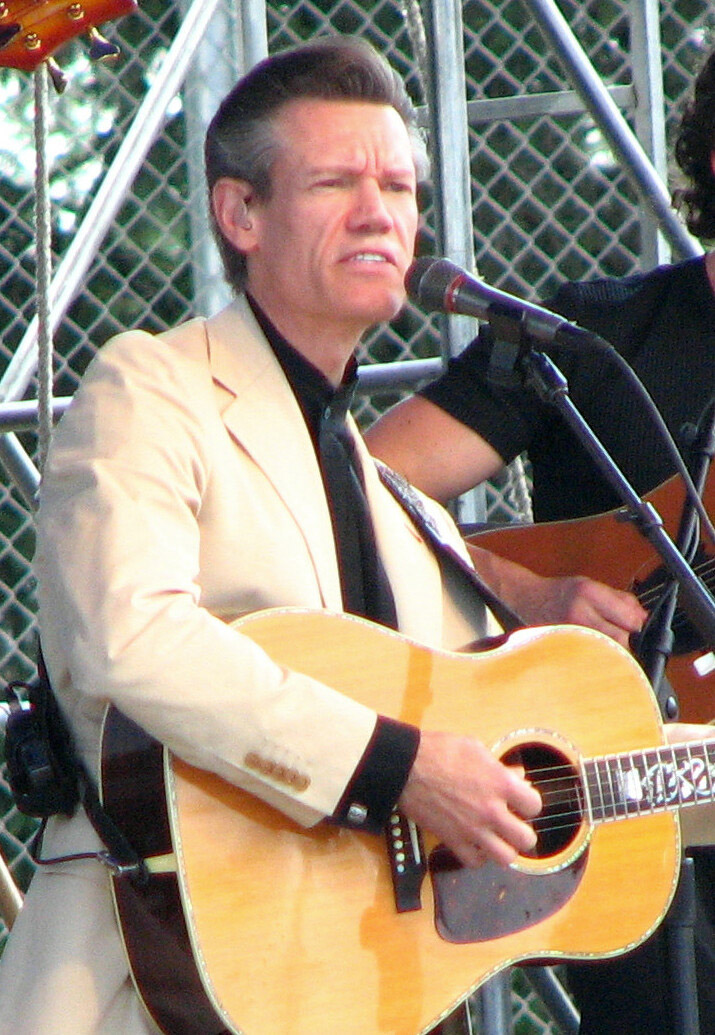
Randy Travis both began and ended the year at number one.

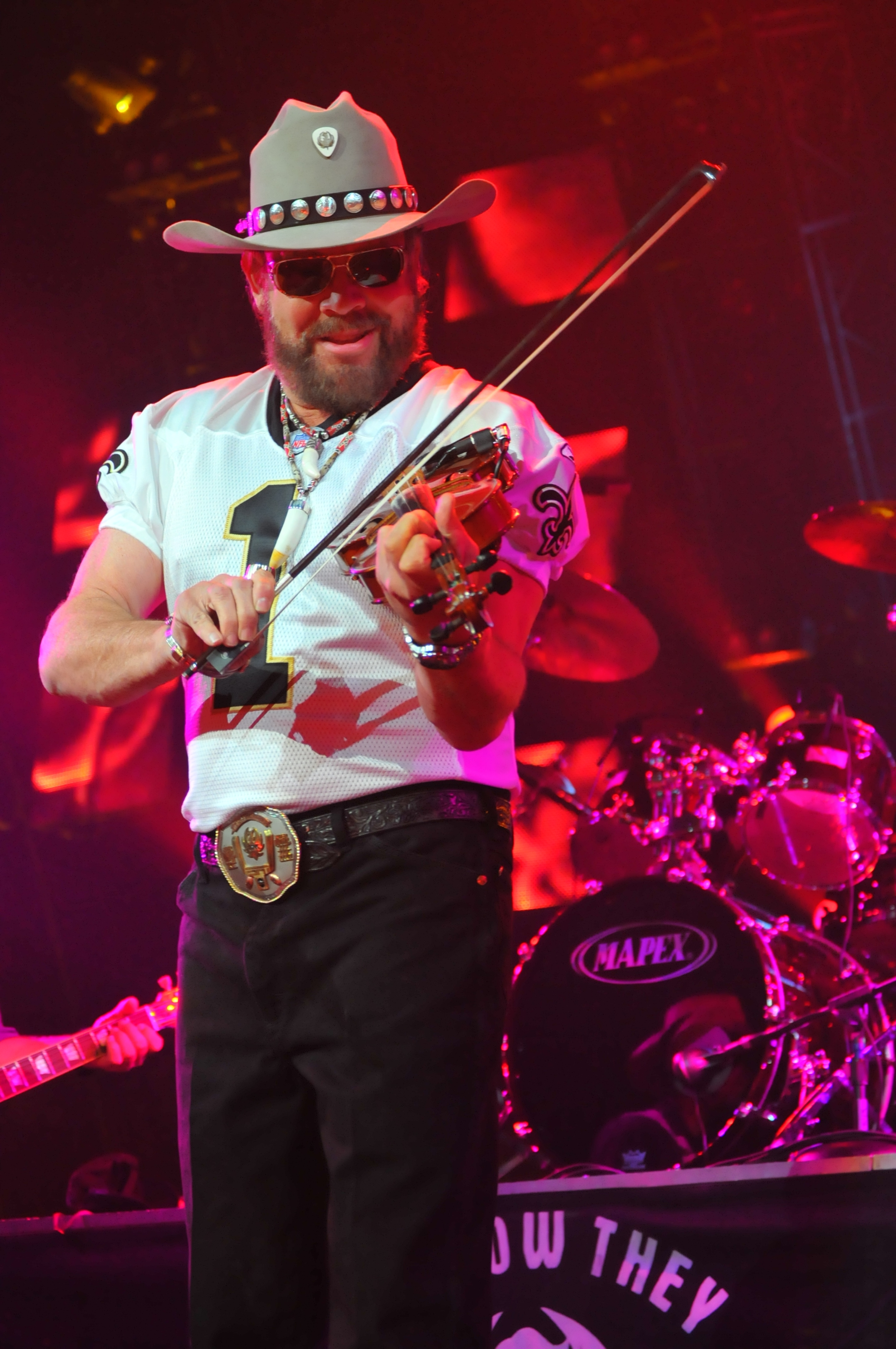
Hank Williams Jr. topped the chart with Greatest Hits, Vol. 3, the last in a run of eight consecutive number ones for the singer.

Issue date	Title	Artist(s)	Ref.
January 7	Old 8×10	Randy Travis	
January 14	Old 8×10	Randy Travis	
January 21	Old 8×10	Randy Travis	
January 28	Old 8×10	Randy Travis	
February 4	Old 8×10	Randy Travis	
February 11	Old 8×10	Randy Travis	
February 18	Old 8×10	Randy Travis	
February 25	Old 8×10	Randy Travis	
March 4	Loving Proof	Ricky Van Shelton	
March 11	Southern Star	Alabama	
March 18	Southern Star	Alabama	
March 25	Southern Star	Alabama	
April 1	Greatest Hits, Vol. 3	Hank Williams Jr.	
April 8	Greatest Hits, Vol. 3	Hank Williams Jr.	
April 15	Greatest Hits, Vol. 3	Hank Williams Jr.	
April 22	Greatest Hits, Vol. 3	Hank Williams Jr.	
April 29	Beyond the Blue Neon	George Strait	
May 6	Greatest Hits, Vol. 3	Hank Williams Jr.	
May 13	Greatest Hits, Vol. 3	Hank Williams Jr.	
May 20	Greatest Hits, Vol. 3	Hank Williams Jr.	
May 27	Greatest Hits, Vol. 3	Hank Williams Jr.	
June 3	Greatest Hits, Vol. 3	Hank Williams Jr.	
June 10	Greatest Hits, Vol. 3	Hank Williams Jr.	
June 17	Greatest Hits, Vol. 3	Hank Williams Jr.	
June 24	Sweet Sixteen	Reba McEntire	
July 1	Sweet Sixteen	Reba McEntire	
July 8	Sweet Sixteen	Reba McEntire	
July 15	Sweet Sixteen	Reba McEntire	
July 22	Sweet Sixteen	Reba McEntire	
July 29	Sweet Sixteen	Reba McEntire	
August 5	Sweet Sixteen	Reba McEntire	
August 12	Sweet Sixteen	Reba McEntire	
August 19	Sweet Sixteen	Reba McEntire	
August 26	Sweet Sixteen	Reba McEntire	
September 2	Sweet Sixteen	Reba McEntire	
September 9	Sweet Sixteen	Reba McEntire	
September 16	Sweet Sixteen	Reba McEntire	
September 23	Killin' Time	Clint Black	
September 30	Killin' Time	Clint Black	
October 7	Killin' Time	Clint Black	
October 14	Killin' Time	Clint Black	
October 21	Killin' Time	Clint Black	
October 28	Killin' Time	Clint Black	
November 4	No Holdin' Back	Randy Travis	
November 11	No Holdin' Back	Randy Travis	
November 18	No Holdin' Back	Randy Travis	
November 25	No Holdin' Back	Randy Travis	
December 2	No Holdin' Back	Randy Travis	
December 9	No Holdin' Back	Randy Travis	
December 16	No Holdin' Back	Randy Travis	
December 23	No Holdin' Back	Randy Travis	
December 30	No Holdin' Back	Randy Travis	
