= There'll Be No Teardrops Tonight (Hank Williams song) =

Single by Hank Williams With His Drifting Cowboys
- A-side: "Mind Your Own Business"
- Published: May 4, 1949 Acuff-Rose Publications, Inc.
- Released: July 1949
- Recorded: December 22, 1948
- Studio: Herzog Studio, Cincinnati
- Genre: Hillbilly, Honky-tonk, Country blues
- Length: 2:47
- Label: MGM
- Songwriter(s): Hank Williams
- Producer(s): Fred Rose

Hank Williams With His Drifting Cowboys singles chronology
"Wedding Bells" (1949)	"There'll Be No Teardrops Tonight" (1949)	"You're Gonna Change (Or I'm Gonna Leave)" (1949)

There'll Be No Teardrops Tonight is a song written by Hank Williams and released on MGM Records as the B-side to "Mind Your Own Business" in July 1949.

== Background ==
According to Colin Escott's 2004 memoir Hank Williams: The Biography, country music disc jockey Nelson King always insisted that he had written "There'll Be No Teardrops Tonight" with Williams, and was surreptitiously credited with a half-share of the song. However, the extent of King's contribution is debatable; songwriter Tillman Franks, who Escott writes "had more or less invented payola in the country record business," later recalled a fishing trip he took with Williams and country singer Webb Pierce:

I'd given Nelson King half of "Three Ways of Knowing" and Hank said, "Franks, you and Pierce have done fucked up business giving these deejays songs." I said, "Hank, I didn't start it. Nelson told me you'd given him half of 'There'll Be No Teardrops Tonight.'" Hank said, "I didn't mean to, I was drunk.'"

Williams' session band was composed of Clyde Baum (mandolin), Zeke Turner (electric guitar), Jerry Byrd (steel guitar), Louis Innis (rhythm guitar), Tommy Jackson (fiddle) and Willie Thawl (bass). The session is notable for being held at a Cincinnati recording studio rather than Castle Studio in Nashville, where Hank usually recorded.

== Cover versions ==
- Al Martino recorded the song for Capitol in 1954.
- Tony Bennett recorded the song in 1954.
- Anita Carter released a version of the song in 1954.
- Joni James recorded the song in 1957.
- George Jones cut a version for his 1960 Mercury album George Jones Salutes Hank Williams.
- Adam Wade charted with the song in 1962.
- The song appears on Hank Williams, Jr.'s 1964 LP Sings the Songs of Hank Williams.
- Tennessee Ernie Ford included it on his 1964 release Country Hits...Feelin' Blue.
- Willie Nelson recorded the song for Liberty in the early 1960s.
- Williams' idol Roy Acuff released a version of the song in 1966.
- Roy Orbison included it on his album Hank Williams the Roy Orbison Way in 1970.
- Ray Price recorded the song for his 1976 LP Hank 'N' Me.
