= Montana Cafe =

Studio album by Hank Williams Jr.
- Released: July 1986
- Length: 34:45
- Label: Warner / Curb
- Producer: Barry Beckett; Jim Ed Norman; Hank Williams Jr.

Hank Williams Jr. chronology
Five-O (1985)	Montana Cafe (1986)	Hank Live (1987)

Singles from Montana Cafe
- 1. "Country State of Mind" Released: June 9, 1986; 2. "Mind Your Own Business" Released: October 1986; 3. "When Something Is Good (Why Does It Change)" Released: February 1987

Professional ratings
Review scores
Source	Rating
Allmusic	3/5 stars

Montana Cafe is the thirty-ninth studio album by American musician Hank Williams Jr. It was released by Warner / Curb in July 1986. "Country State of Mind," "Mind Your Own Business" and "When Something Is Good (Why Does It Change)" were released as singles. The album reached No. 1 on the Top Country Albums chart and has been certified Gold by the RIAA.

== Track listing ==
No.	Title	Writer(s)	Length
1.	"Country State of Mind""	Hank Williams Jr., Roger Alan Wade	4:00
2.	"Montana Cafe"	Williams Jr.	4:13
3.	"My Girl Don't Like My Cowboy Hat"	Williams Jr.	2:14
4.	"When Something Is Good (Why Does It Change)"	Williams Jr.	3:25
5.	"Medley: Harvest Moon/St. Louis Blues"	Frank E. Tours, W. C. Handy	5:01
6.	"You Can't Judge a Book (By Looking at the Cover)" (duet with Huey Lewis)	Willie Dixon	4:00
7.	"My Name Is Bocephus"	Williams Jr.	4:41
8.	"Loving Instructor"	Williams Jr.	2:44
9.	"Fat Friends"	Paul Hatfield, Eddie Long, Bill Marshall, Williams Jr.	2:02
10.	"Mind Your Own Business" (with Reba McEntire, Tom Petty, Reverend Ike and Willie Nelson)	Hank Williams	2:27

== Personnel ==
- Hank Williams Jr. – lead vocals
- Huey Lewis – duet vocals on "You Can't Judge a Book (By Looking at the Cover)"
- Reba McEntire – vocals on "Mind Your Own Business"
- Tom Petty – vocals on "Mind Your Own Business"
- Reverend Ike – vocals on "Mind Your Own Business"
- Willie Nelson – vocals on "Mind Your Own Business"
- Billy Joe Walker Jr. – acoustic guitar
- Reggie Young – electric guitar
- Paul Worley – electric guitar
- Dickey Betts – electric guitar, slide guitar, background vocals
- Thunderhead Hawkins - electric guitar
- Lamar Morris – electric guitar
- Dino Bradley – electric guitar
- Wayne Turner – electric guitar
- Michael Rhodes – bass guitar
- Henry Strzelecki – bass fiddle
- John Barlow Jarvis – piano
- Matt Betton – drums
- Terry McMillan – harmonica, percussion
- Herbert Bruce – trombone
- Ray Carroll – trumpet
- June Carter Cash – autoharp
- Ben Cauley – trumpet
- Sonny Garrish – steel guitar
- Steve Gibson – mandolin
- Ike Harris – tuba
- Jim Horn – baritone saxophone
- Wayne Jackson – trumpet
- Mike Lawler – synthesizer
- "Cowboy" Eddie Long – steel guitar
- Jerry McKinney – tenor saxophone
- Mark O'Connor – fiddle
- Charles Rose – trombone
- Raul Ross – clarinet
- Harvey Thompson – tenor saxophone

== Charts ==
=== Weekly charts ===
Chart (1986)	Peak position
US Billboard 200	93
US Top Country Albums (Billboard)	1

=== Year-end charts ===
Chart (1986)	Position
US Top Country Albums (Billboard)	33
Chart (1987)	Position
US Top Country Albums (Billboard)	28

== Certifications ==
Region	Certification	Certified units/sales
United States (RIAA)	Gold	500,000^{^}
^{^} Shipments figures based on certification alone.
