= Water from the Wells of Home =

Studio album by Johnny Cash
- Released: October 10, 1988
- Studio: JMI Recording Studio (Nashville); McCartney Recording Studio (Icklesham)
- Genre: Country
- Length: 31:21
- Label: Mercury
- Producer: Jack Clement

Johnny Cash chronology
Classic Cash: Hall of Fame Series (1988)	Water from the Wells of Home (1988)	Boom Chicka Boom (1990)

Singles from Water from the Wells of Home
- 1. "That Old Wheel" Released: September 1988; 2. "Ballad of a Teenage Queen" Released: February 1989; 3. "The Last of the Drifters" Released: June 1989

Professional ratings
Review scores
Source	Rating
Allmusic	link
The Rolling Stone Album Guide	4/5 stars

Water from the Wells of Home is the 75th album by American country singer Johnny Cash, released on Mercury Records in 1988 (see 1988 in music). It features several collaborations with other artists, including "New Moon Over Jamaica" with Paul McCartney. Other guests include Waylon Jennings, Hank Williams Jr., Glen Campbell, Emmylou Harris and family members Rosanne Cash, John Carter Cash, June Carter Cash and members of the Carter Family. "Call Me the Breeze" is a J. J. Cale song that had been previously performed by Lynyrd Skynyrd. "Ballad of a Teenage Queen" is a new recording of a song that had appeared on Cash's Sun era album Sings the Songs That Made Him Famous. The album did not fare well on the charts, peaking at No. 48; the two singles, "Ballad of a Teenage Queen" and "That Old Wheel", reached No. 45 and No. 21, respectively. A 2003 re-release of the album contained a bonus track, consisting of Johnny Cash discussing various songs on the album.

== Track listing ==
No.	Title	Writer(s)	Recording date	Length
1.	"Ballad of a Teenage Queen" (with Rosanne Cash and The Everly Brothers)	Jack Clement	March 2, 1988	2:45
2.	"As Long as I Live" (with Emmylou Harris)	Roy Acuff	March 7, 1988	2:58
3.	"Where Did We Go Right" (with June Carter Cash and The Carter Family)	Dave Loggins; Don Schlitz	December 10, 1987	2:58
4.	"The Last of the Drifters" (with Tom T. Hall)	Tom T. Hall	c. February 1988	3:17
5.	"Call Me the Breeze" (with John Carter Cash)	J. J. Cale	December 11, 1987	3:24
6.	"That Old Wheel" (with Hank Williams Jr.)	Jennifer Pierce	March 2, 1988	2:49
7.	"Sweeter Than the Flowers" (with Waylon Jennings)	Morry Burns; Syd Nathan; Ervin T. Rouse	February 10, 1988	2:56
8.	"A Croft in Clachan (The Ballad of Rob MacDunn)" (with Glen Campbell)	John R. Cash	March 2, 1988	4:04
9.	"New Moon Over Jamaica" (with Paul McCartney)	J. R. Cash; Hall; Paul McCartney	April 1988	3:12
10.	"Water from the Wells of Home" (with John Carter Cash)	J. R. Cash	December 10, 1987	2:58
11.	"Johnny Cash Interview" (bonus track)			5:47
Total length:				31:21

== Personnel ==
- Johnny Cash - vocals, rhythm guitar
- Glen Campbell - vocals
- John Carter Cash - vocals
- Emmylou Harris - vocals, rhythm guitar
- Waylon Jennings - vocals
- Paul McCartney - vocals, bass
- Hank Williams Jr. - vocals
- Roy Acuff - vocals
- Carlene Carter - vocals
- Rosanne Cash - vocals
- Don Everly - vocals
- Phil Everly - vocals
- Linda McCartney - vocals
- Anita Carter - vocals
- Jessi Colter - vocals
- June Carter Cash - vocals
- Tom T. Hall - harmony vocals
- Al Casey - guitar
- Marty Stuart - guitar, mandolin
- Mark Howard - guitar, mandolin, assistant musical director
- Jack Clement - rhythm guitar, ukulele
- Hamish Stuart - guitar
- Roy M. "Junior" Huskey - bass
- Charles Cochran - piano, keyboards
- Cindy Reynolds Wyatt - harp
- Ralph Mooney - pedal steel guitar
- John Hartford - banjo
- Lloyd Green - dobro, pedal steel guitar
- Joey Miskulin - piano, accordion, vocals, musical director
- Bobby Wood - piano, keyboards
- Kenny Malone - drums, percussion
- Chris Whitten - drums
- W. S. Holland - drums
- Jim Dant - drums
- Ace Cannon - saxophone
- Traci Werbel - coordination

== Charts ==
Album - Billboard (United States)

Chart (1988)	Peak position
Top Country Albums	48

Singles - Billboard (United States)

Year	Single	Peak positions
Year	Single	US Country
1988	"That Old Wheel"	21
1989	"Ballad of a Teenage Queen"	45
