= Xavier Eikerenkoetter =

American minister

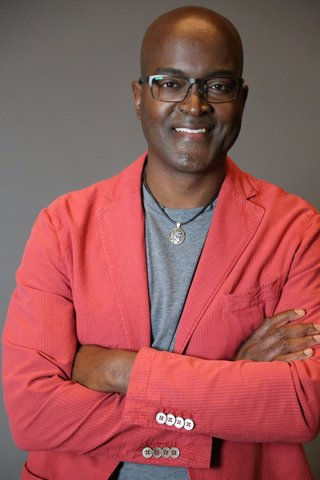
- Website: https://xaviersoulstreams.com/about

Xavier Eikerenkoetter is the son of American minister, preacher, and black televangelist Frederick J. Eikerenkoetter II, better known as Reverend Ike. Eikerenkoetter was formerly the President of the United Palace, a theater in Washington Heights, Manhattan, New York City. He was also the Spiritual Director of the United Palace House of Inspiration, formerly the United Church or Palace Cathedral, founded by Rev. Ike; and is the founder of the United Palace of Cultural Arts.

== Education ==
Ordained at 18, Eikerenkoetter spent three years at the Center for Personal Transformation in the study of deep meditative techniques, received a BA in philosophy from Columbia University, and a master's in counseling psychology from Pacifica Graduate Institute, focusing on Jungian and depth psychology.

Eikerenkoetter's musical studies include four years at the Harrison School of Music. He also studied shamanic training and healing and initiatory drumming techniques with Quechua (Peru), Dagara (Burkina Faso), and Sangoma (Zimbabwe) medicine men, and with the Masai tribe in Kenya. He learned the art of djembe, dunun, and Mandingue drumming from Mamady Keïta and Malinke.

== Career ==
Since 1983, Eikerenkoetter has served as a minister and, since 2009 when his father, Rev. Ike, died, spiritual leader of the congregation housed at the United Palace, formerly known as United Palace Cathedral, and now the United Palace House of Inspiration (UPHI), a non-denominational spiritual community. He founded two non-profit organizations. One was the United Palace of Cultural Arts (UPCA) in New York City. UPCA is an organization that works with inner city youth in New York. The other is the Rhythm Arts Alliance (RAA) in Los Angeles. RAA works with gang affiliated youth and teaches cooperation through mentorship and traditional West African drumming.

As a musician, Eikerenkoetter's three albums recorded to date are Mystic Journey (1998), Global Soul (2001) and Re-Enchantment: Music to Conceive By (2015).

Xavier lives in Napa Valley, California, growing organic and biodynamic cabernet grapes with his wife, Annette.
