= United Palace =

Church and theater in Manhattan, New York

- Loew's 175th Street Theatre
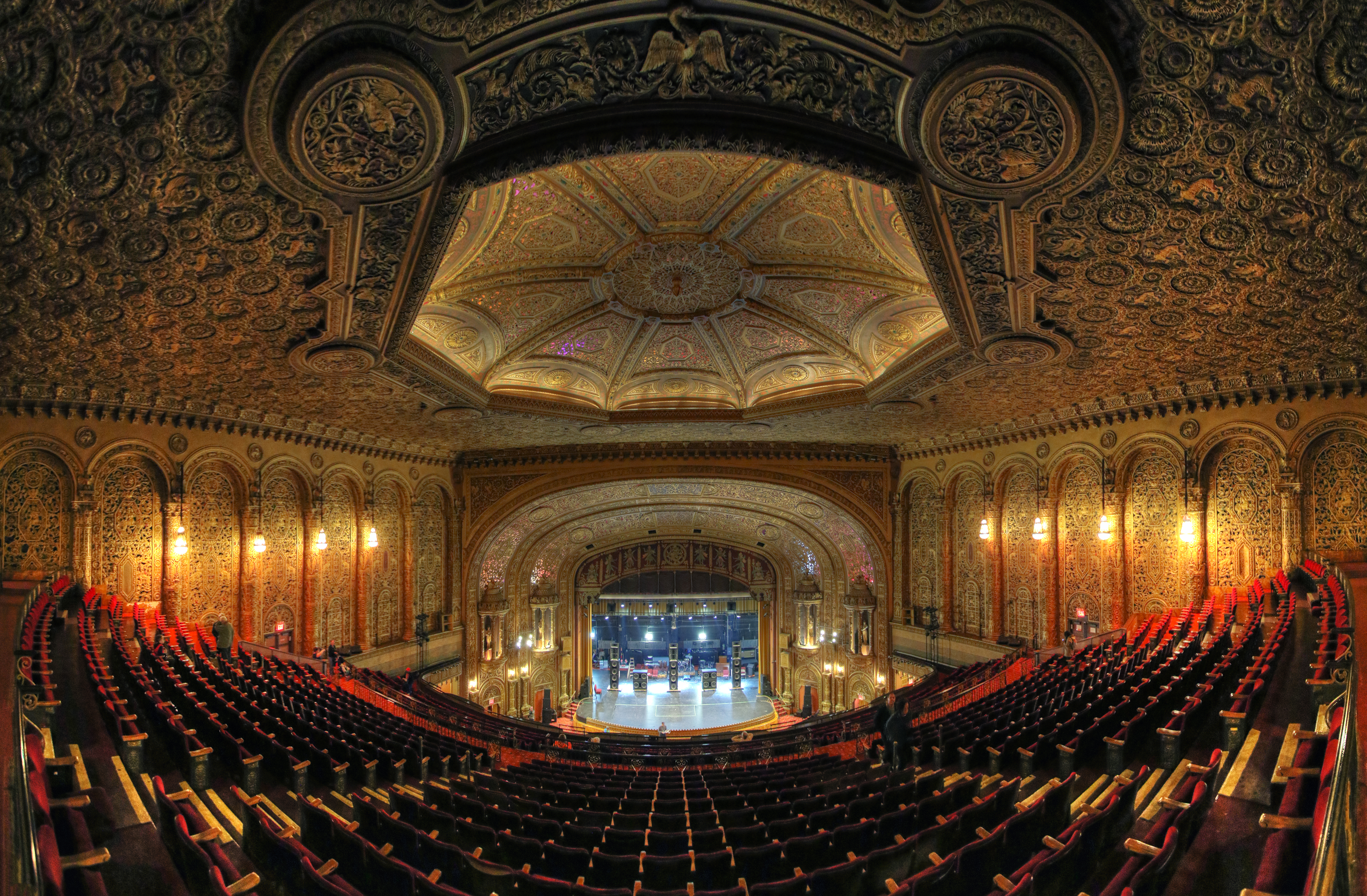
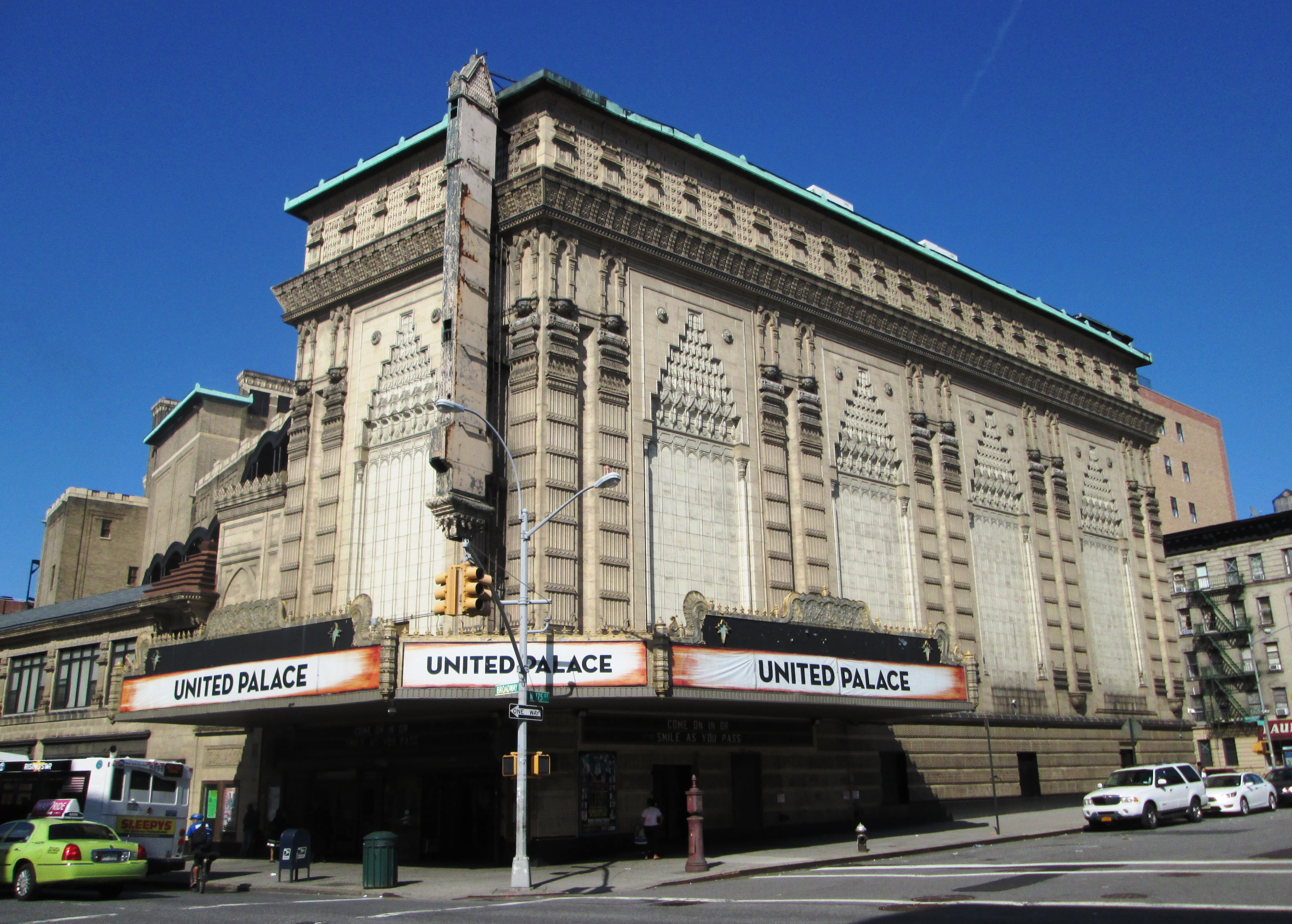
- Interactive map of United Palace
- Address: 4140 Broadway (between West 175th and 176th streets); Manhattan, New York; United States
- Coordinates: 40°50′47″N 73°56′17″W
- Owner: United Palace of Spiritual Arts
- Capacity: 3,350
- Current use: church, concert hall/performing arts center, cinema (classic movies)

Construction
- Opened: 1930
- Architect: Thomas W. Lamb

Website
- www.unitedpalace.org

New York City Landmark
- Designated: December 13, 2016
- Reference no.: 0656

The United Palace (originally Loew's 175th Street Theatre) is a theater at 4140 Broadway in the Washington Heights neighborhood of Manhattan, New York City, United States. The theater, occupying a city block between Broadway, Wadsworth Avenue, and West 175th and 176th Streets, is both a house of worship and a cultural center. Thomas W. Lamb designed the theater as a movie palace, which opened on February 22, 1930, as one of five Loew's Wonder Theatres in the New York City area. The theater's interior decor, incorporating elements of numerous architectural styles, was supervised by Lamb and Harold Rambusch. Like the other Wonder Theaters, the United Palace features a "Wonder Morton" theater pipe organ manufactured by the Robert Morton Organ Company.

The theater was built specifically to present films and live shows, the latter of which were discontinued shortly after the theater opened. The theater operated until 1969, when the television evangelist Rev. Frederick J. Eikerenkoetter II, better known as Reverend Ike, acquired it. The theater became the headquarters of his United Church Science of Living Institute and was renamed the United Palace. Latin American music acts began using the theater in the 1990s, and the United Church began renting the theater out as an event venue in 2007. Various parts of the theater, such as the movie screen and sound system, have been upgraded gradually during the 2010s and 2020s.

The New York City Landmarks Preservation Commission designated the building as a city landmark in 2016. The church is called the United Palace of Spiritual Arts, and it offers performing arts events through the United Palace of Cultural Arts. When the Loew's 175th Street Theatre was in operation, Hollywood stars appeared at the theater to host films. In addition to concerts, the theater hosts other events such as graduation ceremonies, film shoots, meetings, and recording sessions. Critics have written about the mixture of architectural styles used in the building's design.

== Description ==
The theater was designed by Thomas W. Lamb and occupies a full city block in Washington Heights, Manhattan, between Broadway, 175th Street, Wadsworth Avenue, and 176th Street. The structure is divided into two sections: the auditorium portion, which occupies much of the block, and the retail and office portion, which occupies the northwestern corner and runs parallel to Broadway. The Loew's 175th Street Theatre was one of five Loew's Wonder Theatres in the New York City area, along with the Jersey Theatre in Jersey City, the Paradise Theatre in the Bronx, the Kings Theatre in Brooklyn, and the Valencia Theatre in Queens. Along with the Valencia and Paradise, the United Palace is one of three Wonder Theatres that are used as churches in the 21st century. The United Palace was also the last Wonder Theatre to be completed and the only one without a specific architectural style.

The United Palace is one of three theaters in New York that were designed by Lamb with Asian–influenced decorations. The other two theaters are the State Theatre in Syracuse and the Pitkin Theatre in Brooklyn; the designs of both the 175th Street and Pitkin theaters are derived partially from the State Theatre. The United Palace's design also incorporates elements of Aztec, Classical, Egyptian, Islamic, Mayan, and Mughal architecture. Lamb himself wrote that he used exotic decorations to stimulate visitors' minds. At the time of the United Palace's construction, the American public was increasingly becoming interested in Asian culture. A writer for The New York Times Magazine stated that the design may have been inspired by both the Alhambra palace and the Kailasa Temple.

=== Facade ===
The United Palace has an ornate terracotta facade. Similarly to the Pitkin Theater, the United Palace's facade is decorated with niches, pilasters, and panels with curving and geometric motifs; the facade also bore similarities to that of the demolished Loew's Triboro Theatre in Queens. The facade is decorated with hexagonal shapes in a pattern known as muqarnas. There is a cupola or prayer tower, topped by a star, above the northeast corner of the roof. The elaborate ornamentation was intended to entice patrons inside. The historian Ben M. Hall wrote that the theater was "built to be viewed—and admired—from all sides" because there were decorations on all four elevations of the facade.

==== Auditorium portion ====
The entrance protrudes from the western, or Broadway, elevation of the facade. The theater's entrance is at the southern end of the facade's Broadway elevation. There is a marquee wrapping around the chamfer at the theater's southwest corner. Underneath the marquee are two recessed sets of doors made of bronze and glass, as well as a soffit with lights. Between the two sets of doors are a ticket booth with a marble base and bronze frames, topped by cusped arches. There are rusticated blocks with elaborate terracotta ornamentation on either side of the doorways, as well as a signboard above the doorways. Above the marquee is a terracotta panel shaped like a ziggurat. The central panel, in turn, is flanked by two pairs of pilasters with ornate capitals, and there is a niche between each pair of pilasters. A vertical sign is mounted in front of the pilasters to the right (south). The top of the entrance pavilion on Broadway is decorated with an elaborate parapet. There is a smaller two-story pavilion to the left (north) of the main entrance, which has display cases at ground level and a pointed arch with a niche on the second story.

The auditorium has a seven-story-high facade on 176th Street to the north, which occupies the eastern portion of the block. At ground level are four doorways, some display cases, and recessed panels surrounded by terracotta frames. The westernmost portion of the auditorium facade on 176th Street contains windows on the second through seventh stories. The rest of the facade has no windows. Terracotta pilasters divide the upper stories vertically into several wide bays; the theater's cupola rises above the eastern end of the building. The eastern elevation on Wadsworth Avenue has rusticated facade at ground level, with doorways and blind window openings. The upper section of the Wadsworth Avenue facade has a fire escape but is otherwise similar in design to the remaining elevations of the facade. The marquee above the main entrance on Broadway wraps around to the southern elevation on 175th Street.

==== Retail and office portion ====
The northern portion of the Broadway elevation is part of the retail and office section. At the southern end of this section (just to the left of the main theater entrance) is a recessed double door. The rest of the ground-level facade on Broadway has storefronts with roller shutters. There are window sills with foliate ornament beneath the second-story windows. The windows on that story are separated by pilasters. There are ornamental bands atop the second-story windows, with foliate ornament, geometric motifs, and rosettes. A pitched roof runs above the second story. The northwestern corner of the building has a chamfered corner. The western section of the 176th Street elevation, to the north, is similar in design to the northern portion of the Broadway elevation, except that there is an asymmetrical entrance, and the ground story lacks storefronts on 176th Street.

=== Interior ===
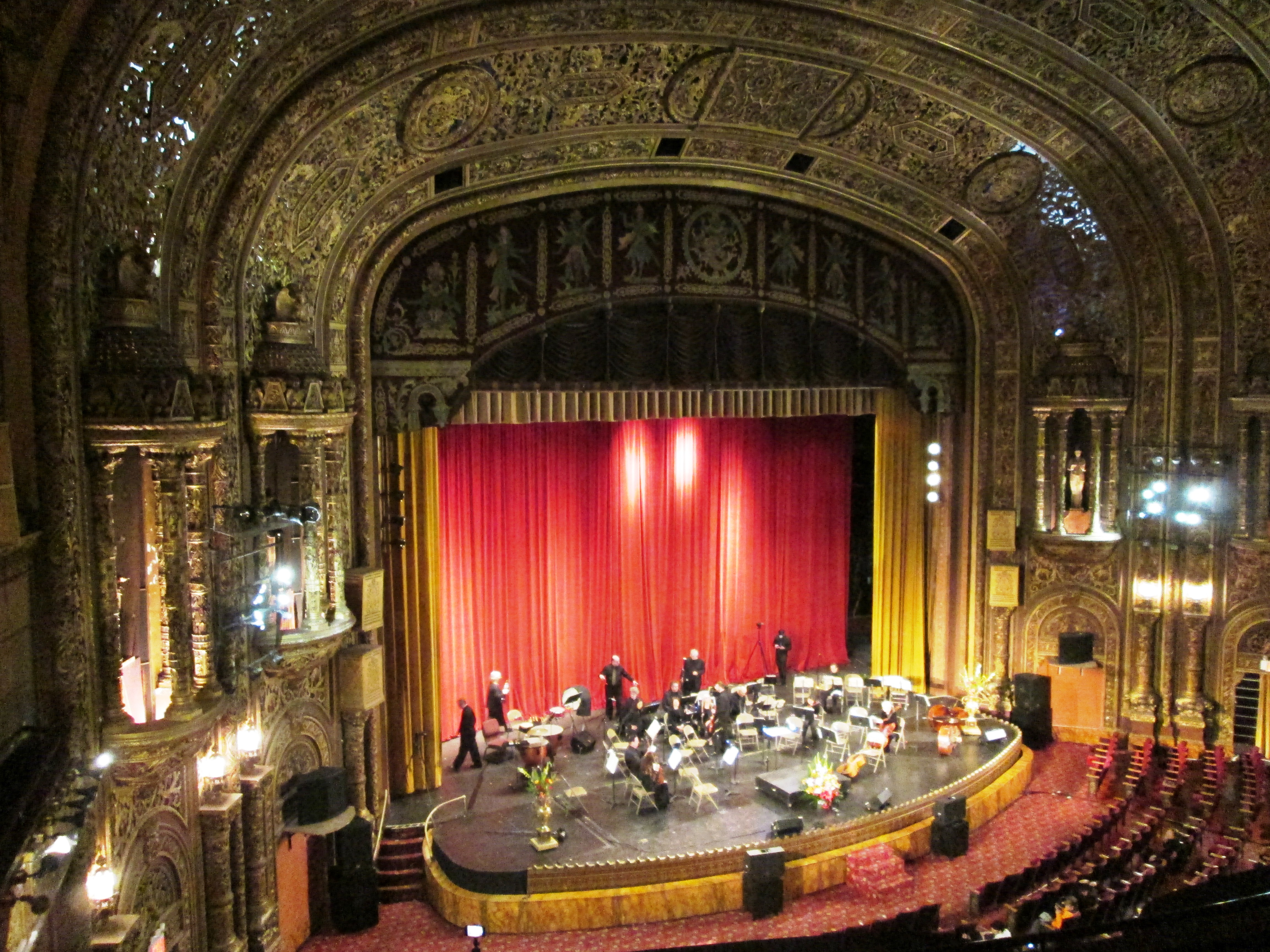
The proscenium and stage of the United Palace; the stage is set up for an orchestral performance

External image
- 360-degree image of the auditorium

Lamb collaborated on the interior design with Harold Rambusch, who had also designed the interiors of Radio City Music Hall and the Waldorf Astoria New York. Rambusch, who regarded movie palaces as "social safety valves", sought to use the theater's elaborate ornamentation to attract visitors. The interior was originally described as being designed in the "Indo–China" style, with Asian-inspired decorations. There are hand-carved and filigreed walls and ceilings, along with Louis XV and XVI furnishings. The spaces are illuminated by indirect, recessed lighting from within and behind the walls, in addition to large Baroque–style chandeliers. The building retains its original elevator, which is accessible upon special request and has red-and-gold walls and a sky-blue ceiling.

==== Lobby and secondary spaces ====
The lobby is a double-height space with balconies surrounding it. A grand staircase connects the ground level with the mezzanine. At the top of the staircase is a silhouette of a goddess with rays emanating from behind her. There is an Oriental–styled mezzanine promenade behind the auditorium, which is decorated with paintings, sculptures, and other artwork. The wall has balconettes that are designed to resemble brass grilles, though they are made of plaster. The mezzanine level also has a men's smoking lounge. When Reverend Ike converted the theater into a church in 1969, the smoking lounge became his personal library. A similar women's lounge on the same level was later used for storage.

==== Auditorium ====
The auditorium, designed in the Byzantine and Romanesque styles, seated over 4,000 people in its heyday. The seating capacity has been downsized over the years to about 3,400 seats by the 21st century. (Note: Sources from the late 20th and early 21st century gave conflicting figures of 3,564, 3,444, 3,361, 3,352, or 3,293 seats.) The seats are spread across a parterre-level orchestra and a balcony level. The balcony itself is split into three sections: a main balcony, an upper loge, and a lower loge. There are niches decorated with bodhisattvas. The auditorium also has rosettes, acanthus leaves, and tendril motifs that depict birds, cherubs, lions, centaurs, griffins, and buraqs.

The auditorium originally was a single-screen theater, with a wide screen similar to those in the other Wonder Theaters. It had a double stage and three lifts in the orchestra pit. The orchestra lifts could be raised to create an extension of the theater's stage. There were also large openings below the stage to allow scenery to be moved. Like the other Wonder Theaters, the Loew's 175th Street featured a "Wonder Morton" theater pipe organ manufactured by the Robert Morton Organ Company. The organ featured a console with 4 manuals and 23 ranks of pipes. The United Palace's organ, which is seven stories high, is the only Wonder Theater organ that remains in use. Events featuring "Live Organ" accompaniment used an electronic organ. After World War II, the organ was sealed for 25 years and was not rediscovered until 1970. The piano, chairs, and organ could be moved to make way for scenery. The organ console remains in place; it was inoperable for decades but was restored in the 2020s.

== History ==
Movie palaces became common in the 1920s between the end of World War I and the beginning of the Great Depression. In the New York City area, only a small number of operators were involved in the construction of movie palaces. These theaters' designers included the legitimate-theater architects Thomas W. Lamb, C. Howard Crane, and John Eberson. By the late 1920s, numerous movie palaces were being developed in outlying neighborhoods in New York City; previously, the city's movie palaces had been concentrated in Midtown Manhattan.

=== Development ===
In 1924, Len Cohen of Loew's Inc. began acquiring property on the city block between Broadway, 175th Street, Wadsworth Avenue, and 176th Street. Cohen spent three years and hundreds of thousands of dollars buying the rest of the city block through 1927. The theater was one of several structures built around the eastern terminus of the George Washington Bridge to northern New Jersey, which was developed around the same time. Loew's had specifically chosen the site because it was in a growing middle-class neighborhood, close to the New York City Subway stations at 175th Street/Fort Washington Avenue and 181st Street/St. Nicholas Avenue. After the assemblage had been completed, Cohen sold the sites in February 1928 to the Highbridge Realty Corporation, which was controlled by Loew's Inc. president Nicholas Schenck

Lamb was hired to design the theater, and he filed plans for the structure with Manhattan's Bureau of Buildings in March 1928. Originally, the theater was supposed to be one story tall and was planned to cost an estimated $1.25 million. (Note: About $18 million in 2025 (Note: Johnston, Louis; Williamson, Samuel H. (2023). "What Was the U.S. GDP Then?". MeasuringWorth. United States Gross Domestic Product deflator figures follow the MeasuringWorth series.)) The Aronberg-Fried Company was hired to construct the theater in May 1929. (Note: Contemporary sources give a date of May 1929, but Landmarks Preservation Commission 2016, p. 10 gives a conflicting date of May 1928.) Loew's initially considered naming the venue the Marcus Loew Memorial Theatre but ultimately decided against it. After ten thousand people suggested names for Loew's theater on 175th Street in early 1930, Loew's decided to name it the Loew's 175th Street Theatre. A week before the Loew's 175th Street was to be dedicated, the opera singer Tito Schipa was invited to test out the acoustics, and a large American flag (dubbed the theater's official flag) was draped over the building. The Loew's 175th Street cost $3 million in total to construct. (Note: About $46 million in 2025) It had numerous ground-level storefronts, many of which had been leased out prior to the theater's opening. The theater was one of several large movie palaces in Upper Manhattan, which, in 1930, had 5% of the borough's population but nearly 20% of its movie palaces.

=== 1930s to 1960s ===
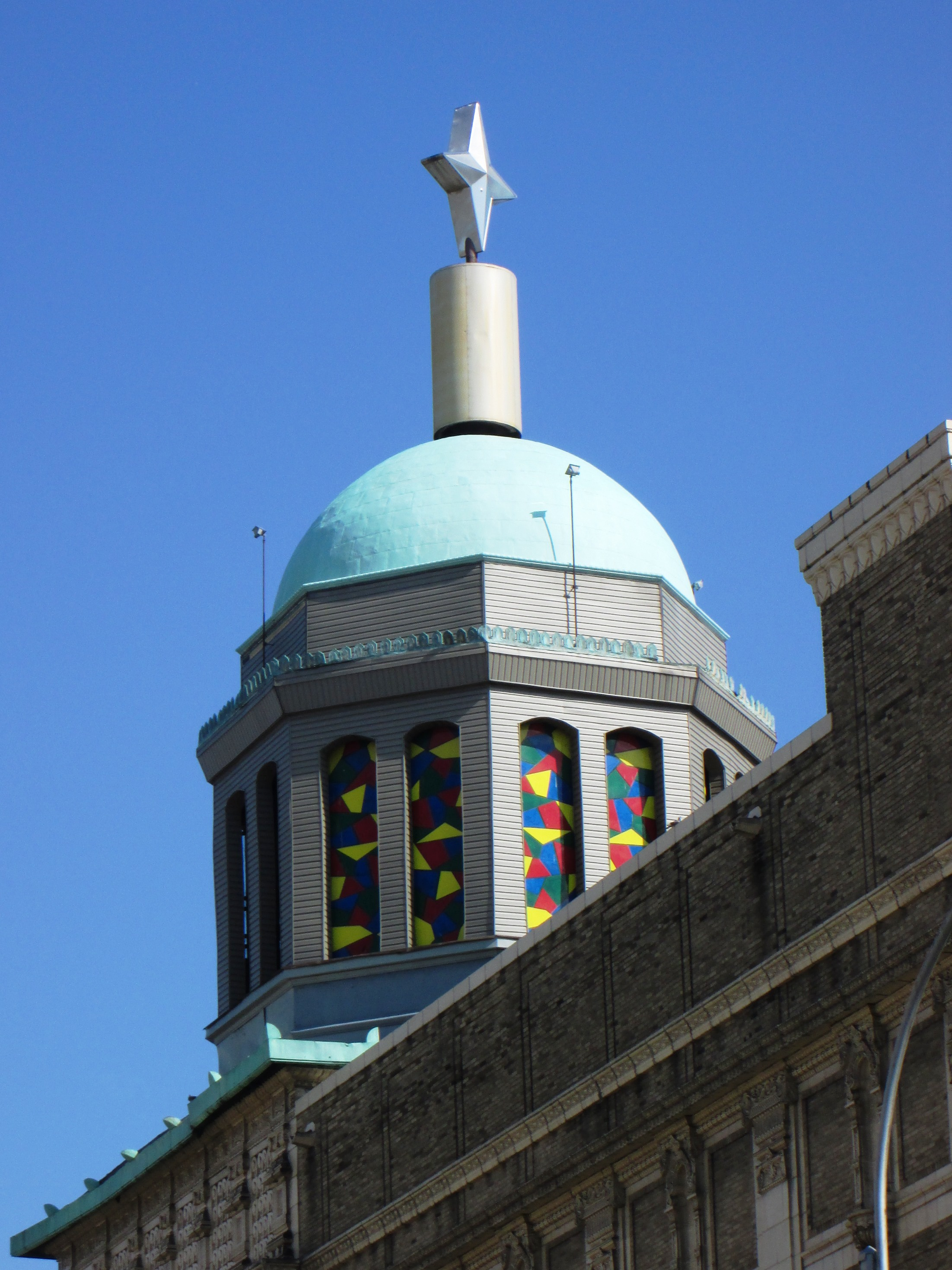
The theater's cupola

The theater's opening date, February 22, 1930, coincided with the observance of Washington's Birthday. The opening was marked by a Boy Scouts parade through Washington Heights. Initially, the Loew's 175th Street screened films and live stage shows; the first program included the MGM film Their Own Desire and the musical revue Pearls. The theater's first month was less profitable than expected, and the Loew's 175th Street stopped presenting stage shows in April 1930. When the George Washington Bridge opened in 1931, Loew's considered re-adding stage shows as a result of increased patronage from New Jersey residents. These stage shows originally opened on Saturdays and ran for one week. In September 1932, the shows were rescheduled to open on Fridays instead. Amid a decline in the number of newly released films, Loew's considered hosting vaudeville shows at the theater in 1936. Starting in 1939, Loew's reduced ticket prices for films at the 175th Street Theatre during weekends.

Loew's implemented a new schedule of film screenings in 1942, in which the theater displayed three double features every two weeks, rather than two double features every week. Following the U.S. Supreme Court's 1948 ruling in United States v. Paramount Pictures, Inc., Loew's Theaters was forced to split up its film-production and film-exhibition divisions. As part of the split, Loew's Theatres was compelled to sell either the 175th Street Theatre or the nearby Rio Theatre; however, the sale was allowed to be deferred if another theater in the neighborhood screened first-run films. In 1953, a stereophonic sound system was installed behind the screen. The Loew's 175th Street Theatre and all of Loew's other theaters were taken over by Loew's Theatres Inc. the next year, while the production division was spun off into Loew's Inc. The theater screened many films in the years after World War II, including musicals, dramas, epics, and comedies.

Meanwhile, by the 1960s, Loew's Theaters Inc. had begun to struggle financially, and the chain closed some of its larger theaters due to high expenses. Despite these difficulties, Loew's Theaters Inc. initially tried various tactics to keep the 175th Street Theatre open. In 1960, Loew's installed an automatic box office machine called Vendaticket at the theater, which sold tickets to patrons. The chain also hosted other events at the theater; for example, American football games were screened there in 1964. However, the theater struggled financially, particularly since it could no longer rely on getting new films from Loew's production studio. Under Loew's management, the 175th Street Theatre screened its last film, 2001: A Space Odyssey, in 1969. After the televangelist Frederick J. "Reverend Ike" Eikerenkoetter II and his wife watched that film, Reverend Ike was so enamored with the theater's design that he asked to buy it so he could move in the next day.

=== 1970s to 2000s ===
In April 1969, Reverend Ike paid $600,000 for the theater (Note: About $4.0 million in 2025) and renamed the building the United Palace. Reverend Ike took a $300,000 mortgage loan (Note: About $2.0 million in 2025) from the Loew's Theatre and Realty Corporation. and he paid Loew's the same amount. He converted the United Palace into a building for his congregation, a non-denominational church called the United Church, Science of Living Institute. Over the next several years, Reverend Ike spent $2 million (Note: About $13.4 million in 2025) redecorating the theater in the Louis XV style. The congregation also began restoring the theater's pipe organ, which was dedicated as the Robert Morton Organ. At the time, the United Palace was one of the few movie palaces in New York City that retained their original organs. The structure was also sometimes referred to as the Palace Cathedral and the Christ Community United Church.

The New York City Landmarks Preservation Commission (LPC) considered designating the theater as a landmark in 1970. However, United Palace objected to the proposal, and the landmark status was not granted at that time. The mortgage on the United Palace building had been paid off by 1973, five years ahead of schedule. At the congregation's peak in the 1970s, the theater attracted up to 5,000 congregants per service, and the church had millions more followers around the world. The majority of congregants were black. Reverend Ike gave sermons from the theater's stage every weekend, and he also hosted annual prayer meetings at the United Palace. The theater hosted other church activities as well, including seminars, counseling, and yoga lessons. The congregation started to dwindle in the 1990s, and Latin American music acts began performing at the theater in the 1990s. Even so, the church continued to spend several million dollars on the theater's upkeep over the years. The historian Warren G. Harris said that Reverend Ike "always took good care of" the theater, keeping the original decorations intact. The tower at the theater's northeast corner was the only part of the theater that Reverend Ike substantially modified.

By the 2000s, the United Palace was nicknamed the "Latin Radio City Music Hall" and hosted salsa concerts, bachata concerts, and some film screenings. It also hosted other events including fashion shows and graduation ceremonies. After Reverend Ike retired in 2007, his son Xavier Eikerenkoetter took over the congregation. The main auditorium was renovated to accommodate events around that time, and the Eikerenkoetter family began renting out the theater for events. The United Palace rapidly gained popularity as an indie music venue starting in March 2007, hosting ten sold-out indie music performances in six weeks. Despite the theater's popularity, visitors criticized the poor acoustics of the auditorium, which tended to cause echoes.

=== 2010s to present ===
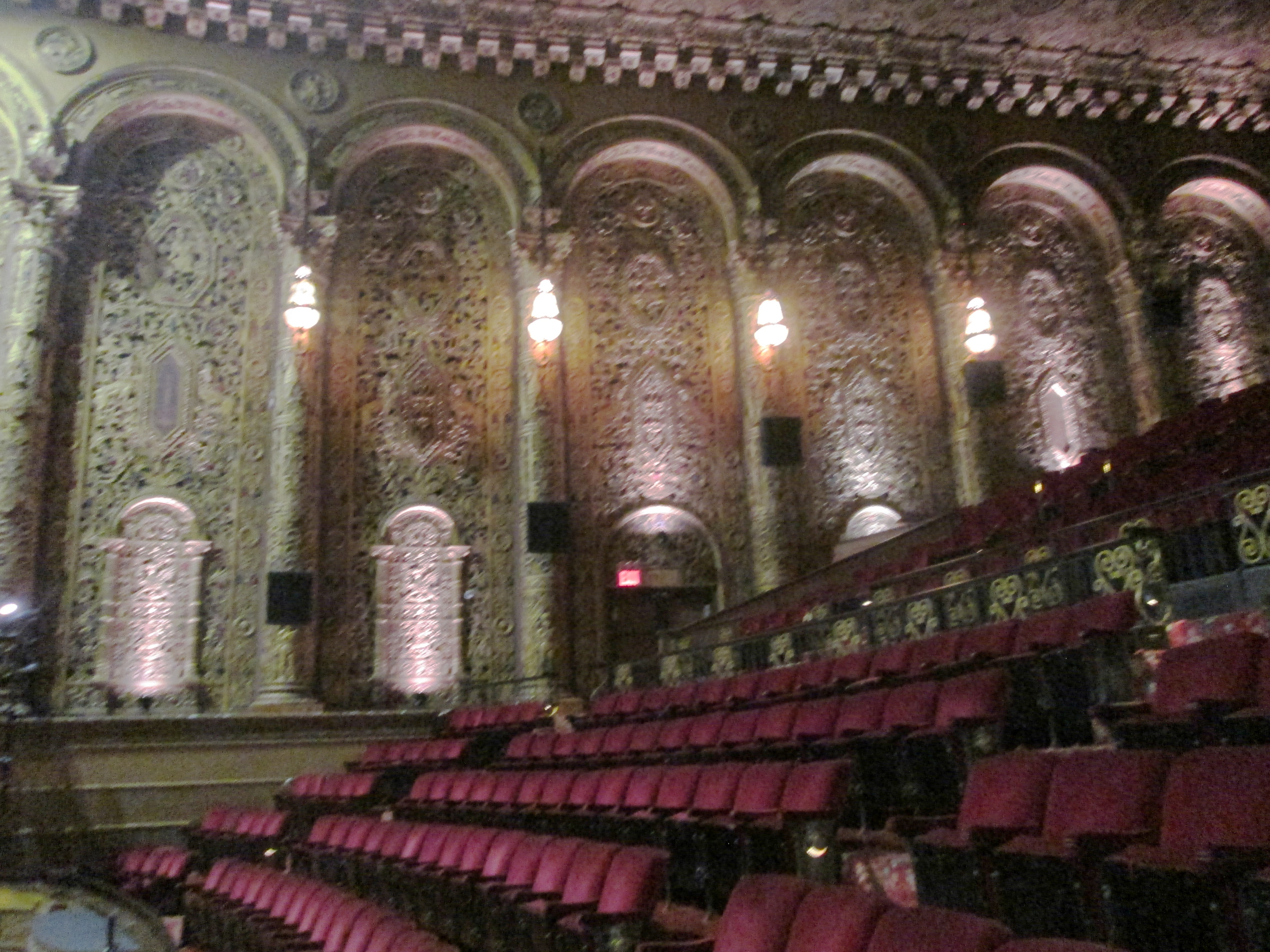
The theater's balcony and right wall

By the 2010s, the congregation met in a small storefront, while the main auditorium was used as a performance venue. At the time, Xavier estimated that about 100 congregants met there every Sunday. Xavier Eikerenkoetter founded the United Palace of Cultural Arts (UPCA) in 2012 to present events and shows at the theater. The next year, UPCA executive director Mike Fitelson launched a campaign to raise money for a 50-foot (15 m) screen and digital projection system in the theater. The fundraiser was organized in response to the 2011 closure of the Coliseum, the only multiplex theater in the area. Local resident and librettist Lin-Manuel Miranda, who first visited the theater that year while staging a special performance of his musical In the Heights, helped with the fundraising effort. The UPCA solicited donations through the crowdfunding website Indiegogo, and they had raised $50,000 toward the screen's installation by August 2013. The theater had started screening films again by October 2013; to reward donors, the UPCA screened the film Casablanca at the theater that November.

In late 2015, the LPC hosted a public hearing on whether to designate the United Palace as a city landmark, as part of a review of 95 listings that had been calendared by the LPC for several decades but never approved. The LPC agreed to consider the United Palace for landmark designation in February 2016. The exterior was made a New York City designated landmark on December 13, 2016; however, the interior was ineligible for landmark preservation because the LPC does not give such designations to houses of worship. At the time, there were no office or retail tenants. The church opposed the landmark designation, citing the added cost and time to do any work on the building, use restrictions, and their fifty-year history of preserving the theater entirely with private funds. The congregation attempted to have the designation overturned but later withdrew their objections. City councilman Ydanis Rodríguez also considered voting against the landmark designation after discussing it with the theater's owners, though he ultimately endorsed the designation, allowing the full New York City Council to approve it.

Miranda donated $100,000 to the theater in 2016 for the addition of a projector. At the time, there were plans to raise another $300,000 for a new sound system. Miranda launched an Indiegogo fundraiser to raise the necessary funds. The same year, the New York Theater Organ Society began restoring the United Palace's organ, which had sustained water damage over the years; the restoration of the organ was completed in 2019. The United Palace was temporarily shuttered in early 2020 during the COVID-19 pandemic in New York City. Workers subsequently renovated the theater's interior and added a new sound system. Audio Spectrum Inc. installed speakers behind the balcony, which previously had poor acoustics. Following these renovations, the United Palace reopened in December 2021.

== Operators ==
The United Palace of Cultural Arts (UPCA) was founded in 2012 and has been designated as a 501(c)(3) nonprofit organization since 2013. In fiscal year 2022, it recorded revenue of $92,800, expenses of $149,000, assets of $74,600, and liabilities of $38,300. The UPCA functions as a community arts center, producing performances for youth arts organizations through grants and fundraisers. The UPCA gives music lessons to local children as part of its Harmony Program. In addition, the UPCA began hosting a monthly film series called Sundays at the Palace in 2014; the idea for the series had come from Miranda, who wanted the theater to host the series annually. Every year, the theater screens six films.

The United Palace's operations also include the United Palace House of Inspiration (later United Palace of Spiritual Arts), which is responsible for the church, and the United Palace Theatre, which oversees theatrical events. The church is a non-denominational spiritual arts community and is also registered as a 501(c)(3) nonprofit, having held this status since 1986.

== Notable performances and films ==
When the Loew's 175th Street Theatre was in operation, Hollywood stars appeared at the theater to host films, including Joan Crawford, Judy Garland, Eleanor Powell, Roy Rogers, and Dale Evans. In addition, Herman Bing performed there in 1937, as did Ed Sullivan in 1946, Al Jolson in 1949, and Alan Freed and his Rock 'n Roll Stage Show in 1958. After the theater was converted into a church, it hosted events such as recitals by the American Theatre Organ Society.

Musical performers since the 2000s have included bands such as the Allman Brothers Band, Arcade Fire, Aventura, Fleet Foxes, Lady A, Monsters of Folk, Return to Forever, The Stooges, and Vampire Weekend. Individual performers at the United Palace have included Anuel AA, Bad Bunny, Beck, Björk, Rubén Blades, Tego Calderón, Kenny Lattimore, Annie Lennox, Modest Mouse, Van Morrison, Iggy Pop, Kelly Price, Steve Winwood, and Neil Young. In 2007, Sir Simon Rattle appeared at the theater conducting the Berlin Philharmonic in Igor Stravinsky's ballet The Rite of Spring danced by public school students and choreographed by Royston Maldoom. The following year, Marin Alsop conducted a performance of Leonard Bernstein's Mass at the theater to celebrate what would have been Bernstein's 90th birthday.

The theater has hosted other events, including a narration of the book Icarus at the Edge of Time in 2012 and a single performance of Lin-Manuel Miranda's musical In the Heights in 2013. The theater was also the site of the premiere of Jon M. Chu's film version of the musical, which opened the 20th Tribeca Film Festival on June 9, 2021. To celebrate the centennial of Fox Studios' founding, the United Palace screened a series of Fox films in 2015, beginning with A Fool There Was and Bright Eyes. On April 7, 2019, the United Palace of Spiritual Arts celebrated its 50th anniversary in the venue with a special screening of the sci-fi classic 2001: A Space Odyssey (the last movie shown at Loew's 175th before it closed as a commercial movie house in 1969). On December 13, 2022, it was announced that the United Palace would be the venue for the 76th Tony Awards, which took place on June 11, 2023.

== Impact ==
=== Critical reception ===
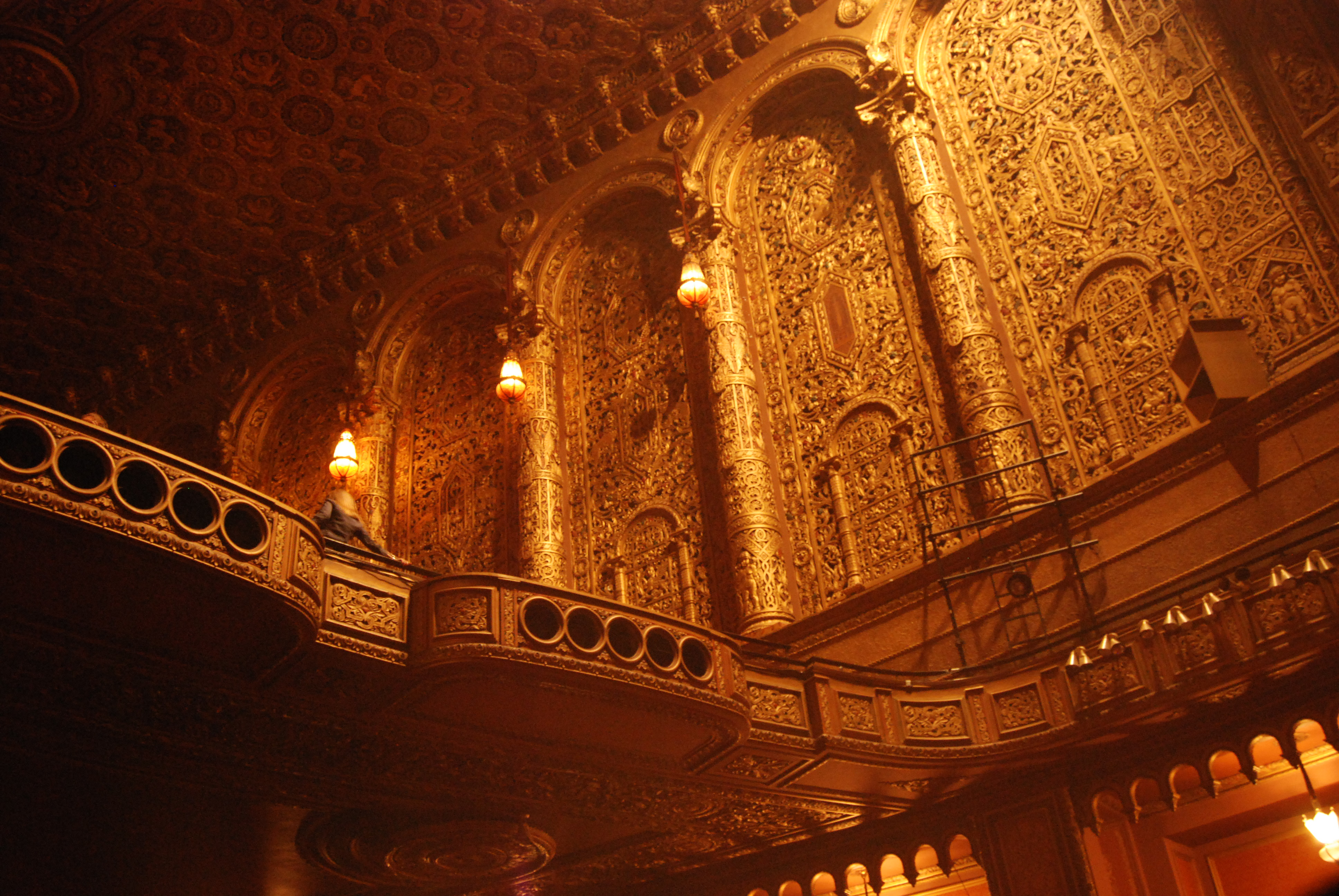
A look at the inside of what has been called a "delirious masterpiece"

There has been commentary on the theater's architectural style. When the Loew's 175th Street opened, the New York Herald Tribune described the theater as "combining the splendor of ancient Oriental beauty with the utmost in modern construction". The architectural style of the theater has been described as "Byzantine-Romanesque-Indo-Hindu-Sino-Moorish-Persian-Eclectic-Rococo-Deco" by David W. Dunlap of The New York Times. Dunlap wrote later that Lamb borrowed from "the Alhambra in Spain, the Kailasa rock-cut shrine in India, and the Wat Phra Keo temple in Thailand, adding Buddhas, bodhisattvas, elephants, and honeycomb stonework in an Islamic pattern known as muqarnas." The AIA Guide to New York City called it "Cambodian neo-Classical" and likened it to Lamb's Loew's Pitkin Theatre in Brownsville, Brooklyn, while art historian Joe Friedman described it as blending elements of buildings such as the Brighton Pavilion and Alhambra. Another New York Times article said that the interior "looks like what might happen if tatted lace exploded inside a Southeast Asian temple".

Nathaniel Adams of The New York Times called it simply a "kitchen-sink masterpiece", while Vivien Raynor wrote for the same newspaper that the theater was a "preposterous mass" with elaborate terracotta ornamentation. Writing for Newsday in 1999, Diane Werts said the United Palace's "splendor" provided a contrast with "today's shoebox movie houses". A writer for the Cinema Theatre Association's Bulletin said in 2001 that the auditorium "must originally have glowed like the inside of a jewel box", and Owen Moritz of the New York Daily News said in 2005 that the United Palace and the other Wonder Theatres "are generally regarded as among the finest movie houses ever built". According to Warren G. Harris, the United Palace was "the most authentic example of movie-palace grandeur in the Greater New York area".

=== Filming location ===
The United Palace has been used as a filming location for several movies, including Café Society (2016) and John Wick: Chapter 3 – Parabellum (2019). Several TV series have been filmed or set at the theater, such as The Politician, Quantico, Saturday Night Live, Smash, Luke Cage, Pose, and Only Murders in the Building. A 2020 performance of Jefferson Mays's A Christmas Carol Live was filmed at the United Palace, and the venue was also depicted in Billy Joel's music video for his 2024 single "Turn the Lights Back On". The theater's history and architecture were detailed in the 1986 documentary American Picture Palaces, and it was featured in a 1991 exhibition of New York City's movie palaces at the City College of New York.

== See also ==
- List of buildings and structures on Broadway in Manhattan
- List of New York City Designated Landmarks in Manhattan above 110th Street
