= Finders Are Keepers =

Single by Hank Williams Jr.

from the album Hank Williams Jr.'s Greatest Hits, Vol. 3
- B-side: "What You Don't Know (Won't Hurt You)"
- Released: May 1989
- Genre: Country
- Length: 3:02
- Label: Warner Bros./Curb
- Songwriter: Hank Williams Jr.
- Producers: Hank Williams Jr., Barry Beckett, Jim Ed Norman

Hank Williams Jr. singles chronology
"There's a Tear in My Beer" (1989)	"Finders Are Keepers" (1989)	"Ain't Nobody's Business" (1990)

"Finders Are Keepers" is a song written and recorded by American country music artist Hank Williams Jr. It was released in May 1989 as the second single from his compilation album Hank Williams Jr.'s Greatest Hits, Vol. 3. The song reached number 6 on the Billboard Hot Country Singles & Tracks chart.

== Chart performance ==
Chart (1989)	Peak position
Canada Country Singles (RPM)	5
US Hot Country Songs (Billboard)	6

=== Year-end charts ===
Chart (1989)	Position
Canada Country Tracks (RPM)	94
US Country Songs (Billboard)	71
