= Wild Streak =

Studio album by Hank Williams Jr.
- Released: June 21, 1988
- Genre: Country rock
- Length: 38:16
- Label: Warner Bros.
- Producer: Barry Beckett; Jim Ed Norman; Hank Williams Jr.

Hank Williams Jr. chronology
Born to Boogie (1987)	Wild Streak (1988)	Greatest Hits, Vol 3 (1989)

Singles from Wild Streak
- 1. "If the South Woulda Won" Released: July 1988; 2. "Early in the Morning and Late at Night" Released: November 5, 1988

Professional ratings
Review scores
Source	Rating
Allmusic	2/5 stars

Wild Streak is the forty-first studio album by American musician Hank Williams Jr. It was released by Warner Bros. Records on June 21, 1988. "If the South Woulda Won" and "Early in the Morning and Late at Night" were released as singles. The album reached No. 1 on the Top Country Albums chart and has been certified Gold by the RIAA.

"Tuesday's Gone" is a Lynyrd Skynyrd cover which later appeared on the 1994 compilation Skynyrd Frynds.

== Track listing ==
No.	Title	Writer(s)	Length
1.	"Wild Streak"	Hank Williams Jr., Terri Sharp	3:01
2.	"If the South Woulda Won"	Williams	3:19
3.	"What You Don't Know (Won't Hurt You)"	Williams	4:31
4.	"You're Gonna Be a Sorry Man"	Al Anderson	3:53
5.	"Love M.D."	Tony Joe White, Leann White	4:14
6.	"Early in the Morning and Late at Night"	Troy Seals, Frank J. Myers	2:29
7.	"I'm Just a Man"	Williams	3:17
8.	"Social Call"	Williams	4:35
9.	"You Brought Me Down to Earth"	Williams	3:33
10.	"Tuesday's Gone"	Allen Collins, Ronnie Van Zant	5:47

== Personnel ==
- Drums: Matt Betton, Bill Marshall
- Bass: Ray Barrickman, Michael Rhodes
- Keyboards, Synthesizers: Barry Beckett, Billy Earheart, John Jarvis, Mike Lawler
- Programming: Carl Marsh
- Guitars: Dino Bradley, Gary Rossington, Wayne Turner, Billy Joe Walker, Jr., Reggie Young
- Steel Guitar: Eddie Long
- Fiddle: Mark O'Connor
- Horns: Herbert Bruce, Ray Carroll, Quitman Dennis, Jack Hale, Michael Haynes, Jim Horn, Jerry McKinney

=== Production ===
- Produced by Hank Williams Jr., Barry Beckett & Jim Ed Norman
- Engineers: Chris Hammond, Scott Hendricks
- Assistant engineer: Ken Criblez
- Mixing: Scott Hendricks, Mark Nevers
- Mastering: Carlos Grier, Denny Purcell

== Charts ==
=== Weekly charts ===
Chart (1988)	Peak position
US Billboard 200	55
US Top Country Albums (Billboard)	1

=== Year-end charts ===
Chart (1988)	Position
US Top Country Albums (Billboard)	27
Chart (1989)	Position
US Top Country Albums (Billboard)	30

== Certifications ==
Region	Certification	Certified units/sales
United States (RIAA)	Gold	500,000^{^}
^{^} Shipments figures based on certification alone.
