= Mind Your Own Business (song) =

1949 single by Hank Williams

Single by Hank Williams With His Drifting Cowboys
- B-side: "There'll Be No Teardrops Tonight"
- Published: July 7, 1949 Acuff-Rose Publications, Inc.
- Released: July 1949
- Recorded: March 1, 1949
- Studio: Castle Studio, Nashville
- Genre: Country, blues, proto-rockabilly
- Length: 2:47
- Label: MGM
- Songwriter: Hank Williams
- Producer: Fred Rose

Hank Williams With His Drifting Cowboys singles chronology
| "Wedding Bells" (1949) | "Mind Your Own Business" (1949) | "You're Gonna Change (Or I'm Gonna Leave)" (1949) |

"Mind Your Own Business" is a 1949 song written and originally performed by Hank Williams.

== Recording ==
"Mind Your Own Business" was recorded on March 2, 1949, at Castle Studio in Nashville. During the same session, Williams also recorded "You're Gonna Change (Or I'm Gonna Leave)", "My Son Calls Another Man Daddy", and "Honky Tonk Blues". He is backed by Dale Potter (fiddle), Don Davis (steel guitar), Zeke Turner (lead guitar), Clyde Baum (mandolin), Jack Shook (rhythm guitar), and probably Ernie Newton (bass).

== Content ==
In the song, the narrator admonishes a local busybody for snooping and gossiping. While the delivery is light and breezy, the song's lyrics were likely inspired by the singer's own tempestuous relationship with wife Audrey Williams and the buzz it created. The opening lines seem to reference this: "If the wife and I are fussin', brother that's our right/'Cause me and that sweet woman's got a license to fight..." His delivery is measured, laconic, and dry. The day before, Hank had cut several duets with his wife Audrey, who by all accounts had limited singing talent. Introducing it in October 1949, he told his radio audience that it was a "little prophecy in song", and indeed it would prove to be.

The song is similar in tone and structure to Williams' first Billboard hit "Move It On Over" (1947), with the singer couching his moral indignation in humor, allowing the subject matter to resonate with the public. "Mind Your Own Business" went to No. 6 on the C&W Best Seller list where it stayed for two weeks.

== Hank Williams Jr. version ==
"Mind Your Own Business"

Single by Hank Williams Jr., Reba McEntire, Tom Petty, and Willie Nelson

from the album Montana Cafe
- Released: October 1986
- Genre: Country, blues, rock and roll
- Length: 2:27
- Label: Warner Bros./Curb
- Songwriter: Hank Williams
- Producers: Hank Williams Jr., Barry Beckett

Hank Williams Jr. singles chronology
| "Country State of Mind" (1986) | "Mind Your Own Business" (1986) | "When Something Is Good (Why Does It Change)" (1987) |

In late 1986, Hank Williams Jr. recorded the song along with Reba McEntire, Tom Petty, Reverend Ike, and Willie Nelson. This version was the most successful, going to No. 1 on the country chart for two weeks.

== Other versions ==
- In 1964, Jimmy Dean hit the country charts with his version of the song. His version spent six weeks on the charts and peaked at No. 35.
- Ernest Tubb included it on his 1968 LP Ernest Tubb Sings Hank Williams.
- In 1971, Steve Goodman recorded it on his debut album.
- In 1975, Henry McCullough recorded the song, and used it as the title track of his solo album on Dark Horse Records.
- Moe Bandy recorded it for his 1975 LP Here I Am Drunk Again.
- Charley Pride recorded it for his 1980 album There's a Little Bit of Hank in Me.
- Moe Bandy recorded the song for his 1983 tribute Sings the Songs of Hank Williams.
- Taj Mahal recorded the song for his 1997 album Señor Blues.

== Sources ==
- Escott, Colin; Merritt, George; MacEwen, William (2004). Hank Williams: The Biography. New York: Little, Brown.
