= Heaven Can't Be Found =

Single by Hank Williams Jr.

from the album Born to Boogie
- B-side: "The Doctor's Song"
- Released: October 1987
- Genre: Country
- Length: 3:11
- Label: Warner Bros./Curb
- Songwriter: Hank Williams Jr.
- Producers: Hank Williams Jr., Barry Beckett

Hank Williams Jr. singles chronology
"Born to Boogie" (1987)	"Heaven Can't Be Found" (1987)	"Young Country" (1988)

"Heaven Can't Be Found" is a song written and recorded by American musician Hank Williams Jr. It was released in October 1987 as the second single from the album Born to Boogie. The song reached number 4 on the Billboard Hot Country Singles & Tracks chart.

== Chart performance ==
Chart (1987–1988)	Peak position
US Hot Country Songs (Billboard)	4
Canadian RPM Country Tracks	13
