= You're Gonna Change (Or I'm Gonna Leave) =

Single by Hank Williams with His Drifting Cowboys
- B-side: "Lost Highway"
- Published: August 5, 1949, Acuff-Rose Publications
- Released: September 9, 1949
- Recorded: March 2, 1949
- Studio: Castle Studio, Nashville
- Genre: Country and western; honky-tonk
- Length: 2:56
- Label: MGM K10506
- Songwriter: Hank Williams
- Producer: Fred Rose

Hank Williams with His Drifting Cowboys singles chronology
"Mind Your Own Business" (1949)	"You're Gonna Change (Or I'm Gonna Leave)" (1949)	"My Bucket's Got a Hole in It" (1949)

"You're Gonna Change (Or I'm Gonna Leave)" is a song written by Hank Williams. It was released as a single on MGM Records in September 1949 and reached #4 on the Best Selling Retail Folk Records chart.

== Background ==
"You're Gonna Change (Or I'm Gonna Leave)" was the fourth in a remarkable string of twenty Top 10 hits that Williams would have between 1949 and his death on New Year's Day 1953. The song was a prime example of the typical Hank Williams A-side: an up-tempo, honky tonk number that could be danced to. In the song, the narrator accuses his wife of lying and warns her that she had better change her ways or he will make good on her empty threats to leave. Williams biographer Colin Escott writes that the song was "clearly born of the dissent on Charles Street," where Hank shared an often tempestuous home life with his wife Audrey Williams. He recorded the song with backing from Dale Potter (fiddle), Don Davis (steel guitar), Zeb Turner (lead guitar), Clyde Baum (mandolin), Jack Shook (rhythm guitar), and probably Ernie Newton (bass). It was cut at Castle Studio in Nashville on March 2, 1949, with Fred Rose producing.

== Cover versions ==
- George Jones included the song on his 1962 LP My Favorites of Hank Williams.
- Hank Williams, Jr. recorded the song for his album The New South in 1977 with Waylon Jennings providing guitar and background vocals.
- Tom Petty contributed a version of the song to the 2001 Williams tribute album Timeless: Hank Williams Tribute.
- Emmylou Harris recorded the song on her 1980 bluegrass album Roses in the Snow.
- The Screaming Blue Messiahs recorded the song on their 1984 album Good and Gone.
