= Young Country =

Single by Hank Williams Jr.

from the album Born to Boogie
- B-side: "Buck Naked"
- Released: February 1988
- Genre: Country
- Length: 3:32
- Label: Warner Bros./Curb
- Songwriter: Hank Williams Jr
- Producers: Barry Beckett, Hank Williams Jr., Jim Ed Norman

Hank Williams Jr. singles chronology
"Heaven Can't Be Found" (1987)	"Young Country" (1988)	"If the South Woulda Won" (1988)

"Young Country" is a song written and recorded by American musician Hank Williams Jr. It features guest vocals from Butch Baker, Steve Earle, Highway 101, Dana McVicker, Marty Stuart, Keith Whitley and T. Graham Brown. It was released in February 1988 as the third and final single from his album Born to Boogie. It peaked at number 2 in the United States and in Canada.

The music video also features many cameos including Waylon Jennings, Ricky Van Shelton, Moe Bandy, Tanya Tucker, Minnie Pearl, Vince Gill, Les Paul, Gary Rossington, Georgia Satellites, Eddie Van Halen, crossover thrash band Suicidal Tendencies, professional football players Dan Hampton and Walter Payton and a young Hank Williams III.

== Charts ==
=== Weekly charts ===
Chart (1988)	Peak position
US Hot Country Songs (Billboard)	2
Canadian RPM Country Tracks	2

=== Year-end charts ===
Chart (1988)	Position
Canadian RPM Country Tracks	33
US Hot Country Songs (Billboard)	33
