= Marty Haggard =

American country music singer (born 1958)

- Born: June 18, 1958 (age 67); Bakersfield, California
- Genres: Country
- Occupation: Singer-songwriter
- Instrument(s): Vocals, guitar
- Years active: 1981–present
- Labels: Dimension, MTM, Critique

Marty Haggard (born June 18, 1958) is an American country music singer. He is the son of singer-songwriter Merle Haggard. Between 1981 and 1987, Haggard charted five singles on the Hot Country Songs charts, in addition to performing in his father's road band.

== Biography ==
Marty Haggard was born June 18, 1958, in Bakersfield, California. He was named after Marty Robbins. At the time that Marty Haggard was born, his father, Merle Haggard, was serving time in San Quentin State Prison. Marty Haggard was raised by his grandmother in a railroad boxcar, but by the time the younger Haggard was 12, he had moved in with his father.

He began an acting career in his teens. He had a recurring role in the CBS drama The Fitzpatricks, and a bit part in a TV movie starring Henry Fonda. While driving to the filming location of the TV movie, he stopped for a hitchhiker who then shot him and left him for dead. A wounded Haggard drove for 15 miles before spotting a 13-year-old girl who called an ambulance for him. He recovered fully, but later developed an infection in the bullet wounds which required further surgery.

=== Musical career ===
Haggard toured with his sister in the Driftwood Band for three years. Later, he worked on an oil field. He signed with Dimension Records in 1979 and released one single, "Charleston Cotton Mill", which spent three weeks on the Hot Country Songs charts in 1981. At his father's request, Haggard joined his road band, in which he sang harmony and played rhythm guitar.

He decided to begin a solo career again in 1985. He then signed with MTM Records, for which he released four singles under the production of Billy Strange. The most successful of these was "Trains Make Me Lonesome", which peaked at number 57 on the country charts, and which helped him receive a nomination for Top New Male Vocalist from the Academy of Country Music. "Trains Make Me Lonesome" was covered by George Strait on his 1992 album Holding My Own. By 1986, Haggard was married for six years to Shree and had two daughters.

After the MTM singles, Haggard was seriously injured in a car accident, suffering head injury and memory loss which required four years of recovery. He signed to Critique Records in 1995 and released his album "Borders & Boundaries. The singles off of that album were "Amnesia" and "Here in the Afterlife." After stopping at Fellowship Bible Church in Conway, Arkansas, Haggard decided to take up music ministry, and went on to record his country-gospel albums titled "Ready or Not, Here He Comes" and "The Bridge. "

Haggard has since married Tessa, and had one son named Jamey with her. He has also released two tribute albums to his father.

== Discography ==
=== Albums ===
Title	Album details
Borders & Boundaries	Release date: 1996; Label: Popular
Ready or Not	Release date: 2000; Label: Popular
The Bridge	Release date: 2000; Label: Popular
Driftwood	Release date: 2009; Label: Self-released
A Tribute to Merle Haggard, My Dad	Release date: 2010; Label: Self-released
A Tribute to Merle Haggard, My Dad, Volume Two	Release date: 2011; Label: Self-released

=== Singles ===
Year	Single	Peak chart positions	Album
Year	Single	US Country	Album
1981	"Charleston Cotton Mill"	85	—
1986	"Talkin' Blue Eyes"	62	—
1987	"Weekend Cowboys"	75	—
1988	"Trains Make Me Lonesome"	57	—
1988	"Now You See 'Em, Now You Don't"	70	—
1996	"Amnesia"	—	Borders & Boundaries
1996	"In the Afterlife"	—	Borders & Boundaries
"—" denotes releases that did not chart

=== Music videos ===
Year	Video
1988	"Trains Make Me Lonesome"
1996	"In the Afterlife"

== Awards and nominations ==
Year	Organization	Award	Nominee/Work	Result
1988	Academy of Country Music Awards	Top New Male Vocalist	Marty Haggard	Nominated
