= Classic Cash: Hall of Fame Series =

Studio album by Johnny Cash
- Released: September 19, 1988
- Recorded: October 12–December 3, 1987
- Studio: Gospel Country Network Studio (Nashville)
- Genres: Rock and roll; rockabilly; country; gospel
- Length: 54:46
- Label: Mercury
- Producer: Johnny Cash

Johnny Cash chronology
Johnny Cash Is Coming to Town (1987)	Classic Cash: Hall of Fame Series (1988)	Water from the Wells of Home (1988)

Singles from Classic Cash: Hall of Fame Series
- 1. "Get Rhythm" Released: March 1988

Professional ratings
Review scores
Source	Rating
Allmusic	1/5 stars
The Rolling Stone Album Guide	4/5 stars

Classic Cash: Hall of Fame Series is the 74th overall album by the American country singer Johnny Cash, released on Mercury Records in 1988 (see 1988 in music). It consists entirely of re-recordings of songs already associated with Cash from his Sun and Columbia days. The album has been both criticized and praised because of the use of several modern production techniques, including synthesizers, in an attempt to update and modernize Cash's earlier songs.

== Track listing ==
No.	Title	Writer(s)	Recording date	Length
1.	"Get Rhythm"	John R. Cash	December 3, 1987	2:30
2.	"Tennessee Flat Top Box"	J. R. Cash	December 3, 1987	3:06
3.	"Long Black Veil"	Danny Dill; Marijohn Wilkin	October 13, 1987	3:14
4.	"A Thing Called Love"	Jerry Reed	December 3, 1987	2:15
5.	"I Still Miss Someone"	J. R. Cash; Roy Cash	October 13, 1987	2:58
6.	"Cry! Cry! Cry!"	J. R. Cash	December 3, 1987	2:24
7.	"Blue Train"	Billy Smith	October 12, 1987	2:03
8.	"Sunday Mornin' Comin' Down"	Kris Kristofferson	October 13, 1987	3:54
9.	"Five Feet High and Rising"	J. R. Cash	October 12, 1987	1:46
10.	"Peace in the Valley"	Thomas A. Dorsey	October 13, 1987	2:54
11.	"Don't Take Your Guns to Town"	J. R. Cash	December 3, 1987	2:55
12.	"Home of the Blues"	J. R. Cash; Glen Douglas; Vic McAlpin	December 3, 1987	3:14
13.	"Guess Things Happen That Way"	Jack Clement	December 3, 1987	1:45
14.	"I Got Stripes"	J. R. Cash; Charlie Williams	October 12, 1987	2:01
15.	"I Walk the Line"	J. R. Cash	October 13, 1987	2:33
16.	"Ring of Fire"	June Carter Cash; Merle Kilgore	December 3, 1987	2:43
17.	"The Ballad of Ira Hayes"	Peter La Farge	December 3, 1987	2:51
18.	"The Ways of a Woman in Love"	Bill Justis; Charlie Rich	December 3, 1987	2:38
19.	"Folsom Prison Blues"	J. R. Cash	October 13, 1987	2:44
20.	"Suppertime"	Ira Stanphill	December 3, 1987	2:22
Total length:				54:46

== Personnel ==
The Johnny Cash Band:

- Johnny Cash - vocals, acoustic rhythm guitar
- Earl P. Ball - piano
- Bob Wootton - electric lead guitar
- W.S. Holland - drums
- Jack Hale - harmonica, trumpet, French horn
- Bob Lewin - synthesizer, trumpet
- Jim Soldi - backing vocals, acoustic guitar, Dobro, electric guitar, synthesizer guitar, bottleneck guitar
- Jimmy Tittle - backing vocals, bass guitar

Additional musicians:

- Terry McMillan - harmonica
- Bryan "Bongo" O'Hanlon - percussion
- Matt Rollings - organ

=== Additional personnel ===
- Produced by: Johnny Cash
- Production assistant: Jimmy Tittle
- Recorded and mixed by Donivan Cowart
- Assistant to Donivan Cowart: Dave Sinko
- Recorded at GCN Recording Studio, Nashville, Tennessee
- Additional recording at Berry Hill Sound, Nashville, Tennessee
- Mixed at the Castle Recording Studio, Franklin, Tennessee
- Mastered by Glenn Meadows at Masterfonics, Nashville, Tennessee
- Equipment handled by J.P. Powell and Jay Dauro
- Photography: Alan Messer
- Design and art direction: Dannah Hayes Macarthur, Hot Off the Griddle Productions
- Liner notes by Tom T. Hall
