= Country State of Mind =

Single by Hank Williams Jr.

from the album Montana Cafe
- B-side: "Fat Friends"
- Released: June 9, 1986
- Genre: Country
- Length: 3:58
- Label: Warner Bros./Curb
- Songwriter(s): Hank Williams Jr., Roger Alan Wade
- Producer(s): Hank Williams Jr., Barry Beckett

Hank Williams Jr. singles chronology
"Ain't Misbehavin'" (1986)	"Country State of Mind" (1986)	"Mind Your Own Business" (1986)

"Country State of Mind" is a song by American country music artist Hank Williams Jr. It was co-written by Hank and Roger Alan Wade, and was released in June 1986 as the first single from the album Montana Cafe. The song reached No. 2 on the Billboard Hot Country Singles & Tracks chart.

== Cover versions ==
Mark Chesnutt covered the song for his 2010 album Outlaw. A decade later, the song was covered as a duet between Josh Turner and Chris Janson for Turner's namesake album.

== Chart performance ==
Chart (1986)	Peak position
US Hot Country Songs (Billboard)	2
Canadian RPM Country Tracks	4

== Certifications ==
Region	Certification	Certified units/sales
United States (RIAA)	Gold	500,000^{‡}
^{‡} Sales+streaming figures based on certification alone.
