= Butch Baker =

American singer-songwriter

- Born: October 22, 1958 (age 67); Sweetwater, Tennessee, United States
- Genres: Country
- Occupation: Singer-songwriter
- Instrument: Vocals
- Years active: 1984–90
- Label: Mercury

Butch Baker (born October 22, 1958) is an American country music artist. He recorded for Mercury Records in the late 1980s, releasing multiple singles between 1984 and 1990, as well as the album We Will. His highest-peaking single, "That's What Her Memory Is For", peaked at No. 41 on the U.S. country charts in 1986.

== Biography ==
Butch Baker was born in Sweetwater, Tennessee. He first sang at nineteen months in his father's church. Taking influence from gospel music as well as rock and country acts such as The Everly Brothers, Elvis Presley, Don Gibson and others, he decided to pursue a musical career after graduating from Tennessee Military Institute and majoring in drama at the University of Tennessee.

Baker moved to Nashville, Tennessee in 1979. There, he sold men's clothing during the day and attended various gigs at night, eventually being hired for one. Afterward, he went on to record demos, eventually becoming a staff writer for Acuff-Rose Music as well. In 1984, he signed to a recording contract with Mercury Records. He released three singles for the label, including "Thinking 'bout Leaving", which peaked at 56 on the Billboard country charts. After this song came his highest chart peak, the Number 41 "That's What Her Memory Is For." He continued to release singles through the 1980s, and was one of several guest vocalists on Hank Williams, Jr.'s 1987 single "Young Country" (from the Born to Boogie album). However, his debut album, the Harold Shedd-produced We Will, was not issued until 1990. This album included a cover version of Eric Clapton's "Wonderful Tonight". That same year, he charted for the last time as a duet partner on labelmate Daniele Alexander's "It Wasn't You, It Wasn't Me". This was from Alexander's second album, I Dream in Color, which included two other duets with him. After exiting Mercury in 1990, he became a regular on a video program for The Nashville Network (now Spike TV).

In the 21st century, Butch Baker founded the duo Alive in Eden with songwriter Jim Dowell.

== Discography ==
=== Albums ===
| Year | Album details | Label |
|---|---|---|
| 1989 | We Will | PolyGram/Mercury |

=== Singles ===
| Year | Single | Chart Positions | Album |
| Year | Single | US Country | Album |
|---|---|---|---|
| 1984 | "Torture" | — | singles only |
| 1984 | "Burn Georgia Burn (There's a Fire in Your Soul)" | 80 | singles only |
| 1984 | "Thinking 'bout Leaving" | 56 | singles only |
| 1986 | "That's What Her Memory Is For" | 41 | singles only |
| 1986 | "Your Loving Side" | 53 | singles only |
| 1987 | "Don't It Make You Want to Go Home" | 51 | singles only |
| 1987 | "I'll Fall in Love Again" | 60 | singles only |
| 1988 | "Party People" | 69 | We Will |
| 1989 | "Our Little Corner" | 64 | We Will |
| 1989 | "Wonderful Tonight" | 66 | We Will |
| 2000 | "Lover's Waltz" | — | —N/a |

=== Guest singles ===
| Year | Single | Artist | Chart Positions | Album |
| Year | Single | Artist | US Country | Album |
|---|---|---|---|---|
| 1990 | "Tomorrow's World" | various artists | 74 | single only |
| 1990 | "It Wasn't You, It Wasn't Me" | Daniele Alexander | 56 | I Dream in Color |

=== Music videos ===
| Year | Video | Director |
|---|---|---|
| 1989 | "Our Little Corner" | John Lloyd Miller |
