= That Old Wheel =

Song by Johnny Cash

Single by Johnny Cash with Hank Williams Jr.

from the album Water from the Wells of Home
- B-side: "Tennessee Flat Top Box"
- Released: 1988
- Genre: Country
- Label: Mercury 870 688-7
- Songwriter: Jennifer Pierce
- Producer: Jack Clement

Johnny Cash with Hank Williams Jr. singles chronology
"Get Rhythm" (1988)	"That Old Wheel" (1988)	"Ballad of a Teenage Queen" (1989)

Audio
- "That Old Wheel" on YouTube

"That Old Wheel" is a song written by Jennifer Pierce and recorded by Johnny Cash together with Hank Williams Jr. for Cash's Jack Clement–produced 1988 album Water from the Wells of Home.

Released in September 1988 as the lead single from the album, the song reached number 21 on U.S. Billboard's country chart for the week of December 3. The other side of the single was a recording of Cash singing "Tennessee Flat Top Box" from the 1988 album Classic Cash – Hall of Fame Series.

== Content ==
The song is a country ballad which philosophically talks about two friends who "roll along through life like 'that old wheel'".

The song is filled with sage advice about standing strong and overcoming life's obstacles. And to those who injure us, know that "they will sow as they reap ... and that old wheel will roll around again."

— John M. Alexander The Man in Song: A Discographic Biography of Johnny Cash

== History ==
When Cash and Jack Clement were working on Cash's second Mercury album, they came with the idea to team up with artists who were popular right now. And one of such artists would be Hank Williams Jr.

If country DJ's weren't interested in a Johnny Cash album, maybe they'd play the record if we were teamed with a "hot" artist. What about a duet with Hank Williams Jr., who was red-hot, registering seven number-one singles in the 1980s, two in 1986 alone?

— Robert Hilburn. Johnny Cash: The Life

Moreover, Hank Williams Jr. was a longtime friend of Cash. In his book on Johnny Cash, C. Eric Banister quotes him saying, "I worked with Hank Jr. when he was fifteen, sixteen years old. He was part of my show, and he was stealing the show from me. I always wanted to have him on one of my records and we finally found a song."

The album concept, especially the idea of a duet with Hank Williams Jr., appealed to record company executive Steve Popovich.

Popovich loved the idea, especially the Hank Jr. track, a spiritually tinged feel-good song by Jennifer Pierce called "That Old Wheel." He told everyone at PolyGram in New York that he had a smash.

— Robert Hilburn. Johnny Cash: The Life

The song would be eventually chosen as the lead single from the album.

Despite all the expectations, the song went only to number 21 on the Billboard country chart.

== Track listing ==
7" single (Mercury 870 688-7, 1988)
No.	Title	Writer(s)	Length
1.	"That Old Wheel"	J. Pierce	2:48
2.	"Tennessee Flat Top Box"	J. R. Cash	3:06

== Charts ==
Chart (1988)	Peak position
US Hot Country Songs (Billboard)	21
