= There's a Tear in My Beer =

Single by Hank Williams Jr. and Hank Williams

from the album Hank Williams Jr.'s Greatest Hits, Vol. 3
- B-side: "You Brought Me Down to Earth"
- Released: January 1989
- Recorded: 1950, 1988
- Genre: Country, honky tonk
- Length: 2:51
- Label: Warner Bros./Curb
- Songwriter: Hank Williams
- Producers: Hank Williams Jr., Barry Beckett, Jim Ed Norman

Hank Williams Jr. singles chronology
| "Early in the Morning and Late at Night" (1988) | "There's a Tear in My Beer" (1989) | "Finders Are Keepers" (1989) |

Hank Williams singles chronology
| "Please Don't Let Me Love You" (1955) | "There's a Tear in My Beer" (1989) |

"There's a Tear in My Beer" is a country song written by Hank Williams. Originally recorded by "Big Bill" Lister, the song was later re-recorded in 1988 by Williams's son Hank Williams Jr., featuring an original vocal track by the elder Williams. The duet version was released as a single in 1988, charting within the top ten of the Billboard country music charts.

== Original version ==
The original version was written by Hank Williams during one of his Nashville sessions in 1950-51, but his publisher and producer Fred Rose was averse to mentioning alcohol in songs. Lister, who opened show dates for Williams for a time, needed a drinking song, and Williams gave him the demo he had recorded. Lister recorded it and released it in 1952 on the Capitol label. He gave the demo to Wiliams' son more than 40 years later.

== 1988 version ==
Hank Williams Jr.'s version is a duet with his father. The original acetate disc was transferred to audio tape by Alan Stoker at the Country Music Hall of Fame and Museum. As the demo had been recorded with Williams playing the guitar as the sole instrument, his son and his band simply "filled in the blanks" and recorded additional vocals. The music video for the song combined television footage that had existed of Hank Williams performing, onto which electronic merging technology impressed the recordings of Hank Jr., which then made it appear as if he were playing with his father. The video was both a critical and commercial success, and was named Video Of The Year by both the Country Music Association and the Academy of Country Music. Hank Williams, Sr. & Jr., would go on to "share" a Grammy award win in 1990 for Best Country Vocal Collaboration. Lister finding the song in his attic was inspiration for a Paul Harvey "Rest of the Story" radio episode in the late 1980s and early 1990s.

== Cover versions ==
Country music singer Brad Paisley covered the song from the television special CMT Giants: Hank Williams Jr.

== Music video ==
The music video was directed by Ethan Russell and produced by [Joanne Gardner/ACME Pictures] and premiered in early 1989. In the video, Hank Williams Jr. performs the song by himself in an old house on a stormy night. After the first chorus, he hears vocals and sees a silhouette coming from behind a door near him. After harmonizing for a couple of bars with the mystery singer, he opens the door to discover his father, Hank Williams Sr., playing the song with his band in footage of an old performance. Hank Jr. then walks through the door and magically appears by his father's side to finish the song together.

The footage of Hank Sr. was a digitally modified kinescope of a 1952 performance of "Hey, Good Lookin'" on the Kate Smith Evening Hour. The editing team made several hundred minute tweaks to lay a new mouth (that of an actor dressed like Hank, Sr.) over the mouth of the original Hank. What now seems quaint was at the time quite groundbreaking. The New York Times did a feature on the video and its cutting edge visual effects, released around the time Forrest Gump used similar effects.

== Chart performance ==
| Chart (1989) | Peak position |
|---|---|
| US Hot Country Songs (Billboard) | 7 |
