= Roger Alan Wade =

American country singer

- Origin: Chattanooga, Tennessee, U.S.
- Genres: Country, comedy music
- Occupations: Singer-songwriter, musician
- Instruments: Vocals, guitar
- Label: Dickhouse Records / Johnny Knoxville

Roger Alan Wade is an American singer-songwriter from Chattanooga, Tennessee.

== Career ==
According to his website, Wade has penned songs for country legends such as Johnny Cash, Waylon Jennings, George Jones, Hank Williams, Jr. and several others. One of his best known songs is "If You're Gonna Be Dumb, You Gotta Be Tough" for the Jackass movie from his All Likkered Up album. He also co-wrote the hit song "Country State of Mind" with Hank Williams, Jr.

Much of Wade's work is comedically-based, while the other side is serious and takes on a lyrical tone. It includes songs such as such as "The First Time I Saw Waylon", "Brainerd Road", "Jingle Jangle", "Cohere Coheres", "Loneliness Is My Only True Friend", "A Sioux Named Boy", "Old Dixie Highway", and "Sometimes I Don't Know If I'll Make It". He also performed the music for the Jackass movie series.

Wade wrote "The Light Outlives the Star" for a friend of his daughter who died in an automobile accident. It later served as a tribute to his friend and fan, Ryan Dunn, who died in a car accident on June 20, 2011.

Wade's lyrics satirize stereotypical redneck and honky tonk culture. His songs feature folky arrangements, sometimes performing solo using only his acoustic guitar, and other times performing in band settings with backup players and performers. In concert, Roger is known for a line where he satirically states, "This is a song about a girl," before many of his songs.

He started his solo career with help from his cousin, actor Johnny Knoxville. When the two men appeared on the May 7, 2003 episode of The Howard Stern Show, Stern praised Wade's songs and played them on the show several times after. Wade was featured in the April, 2005 "Deep South" episode of Knoxville's MTV reality series, Wildboyz. Knoxville occasionally featured his cousin's music on his TV show Jackass. "If You're Gonna Be Dumb, You Gotta Be Tough" has appeared in every Jackass movie. Wade's version was used in the first film, Jackass: The Movie (2002). Sequels have featured covers by Smut Peddlers, Karen O, The Deadly Syndrome, Yelawolf, DJ Paul, Starcrawler and Billy Strings. Since 2008, Knoxville and Wade have hosted an hour-long weekly show, Big Ass Happy Family Jubilee (named after a Wade song), on SiriusXM's Outlaw Country channel.

Wade has provided voiceover work for WUUQ 97.3 and 99.3 FM, a classic country station in Chattanooga, Tennessee. He did the same for classic-country formatted WWLG "96.7 The Legend" in Atlanta, Georgia, from its launch in late 2007 to around 2009.

== Discography ==
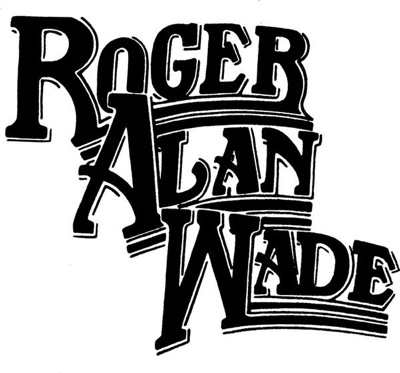
Wade's logo

- All Likkered Up (2005)
- Stoned Traveler (2008)
- Deguello Motel (2010)
- Too Fat to Fly (2011)
- Southbound Train (2012)
- Bad News Knockin (2014)
- Simmering Rage (2019)

== Filmography ==
- 2023: The Prank Panel (1 episode)
- 2006: Jackass Number Two
- 2005: Wildboyz (1 episode)

== Soundtrack ==
- 2002: Jackass: The Movie (writer/performer: "If You're Gonna Be Dumb, You Gotta Be Tough")
- 2003: Grand Theft Parsons (writer/performer: "Rhinestones in the Ashes")
- 2006: Jackass Number Two (writer/performer: "Sometimes I Don't Know If I'll Make It") (writer: "If You're Gonna Be Dumb, You Gotta Be Tough") (performed by Smut Peddlers))
- 2007: Jackass 2.5 (writer/performer: "D-R-U-N-K")
- 2007: Jackass: The Game (writer/performer: "If You're Gonna Be Dumb, You Gotta Be Tough") (writer/performer: "BB Gun")
- 2009: Nitro Circus (writer/performer: "D-R-U-N-K")
- 2009: The Wild and Wonderful Whites of West Virginia (writer/performer: "Big Ass Happy Family")
- 2009: Jackass: The Lost Tapes (writer/performer: "If You're Gonna Be Dumb, You Gotta Be Tough") (writer/performer: "D-R-U-N-K")
- 2010: Jackass 3D (writer/performer: "Party in My Pants") (writer: "If You're Gonna Be Dumb, You Gotta Be Tough" (performed by Karen O))
- 2011: Jackass 3.5 (writer/performer: "Too Fat to Fly") (writer: "If You're Gonna Be Dumb, You Gotta Be Tough") (performed by The Deadly Syndrome)
- 2013: Jackass Presents: Bad Grandpa (writer/performer: "Stoned Traveler")
- 2018: Action Point (writer/performer: "Drunk, Stoned, & Coked Up")
- 2022: Jackass Forever (writer/performer: "I Don't Like Being Told What To Do") (chorus writer: "If You're Gonna Be Dumb, You Gotta Be Tough) (performed by DJ Paul, and Yelawolf)
- 2022: Jackass 4.5 (writer: "If You're Gonna Be Dumb, You Gotta Be Tough") (performed by Starcrawler)
- 2022: Jackass Shark Week 2.0 (writer "If You're Gonna Be Dumb, You Gotta Be Tough") (performed by Smut Peddlers)
- 2023: The Prank Panel (writer/performer: "Keepin' It In The Family")
- 2026: Jackass: Best and Last (performer: "We'll Meet Again") (writer: "If You're Gonna Be Dumb, You Gotta Be Tough" (performed by Billy Strings))
