= Reverend Ike =

American Christian minister and television personality

- Born: Frederick J. Eikerenkoetter II; June 1, 1935; Ridgeland, South Carolina
- Died: July 28, 2009 (aged 74); Los Angeles, California
- Spouse: Eula M. Dent
- Website: www.scienceoflivingonline.com

Frederick J. Eikerenkoetter II (June 1, 1935 – July 28, 2009), better known as Reverend Ike, was an American minister and evangelist based in New York City. He was known for the slogan "You can't lose with the stuff I use!" Though his preaching is considered a form of prosperity theology, Reverend Ike diverged from traditional Christian theology and taught what he called "Science of Living".

== Life and career ==
Frederick J. Eikerenkoetter II was born in Ridgeland, South Carolina to parents from the Netherlands Antilles, and was of African and Indo (Dutch-Indonesian) descent. He began his career as a teenage preacher and became assistant pastor at Bible Way Church in Ridgeland, South Carolina. After serving a stint in the Air Force as a Chaplain Service Specialist (a non-commissioned officer assigned to assist commissioned Air Force chaplains), he founded, successively, the United Church of Jesus Christ for All People in Beaufort, South Carolina, the United Christian Evangelistic Association in Boston, Massachusetts, his main corporate entity, and the Christ Community United Church in New York City.

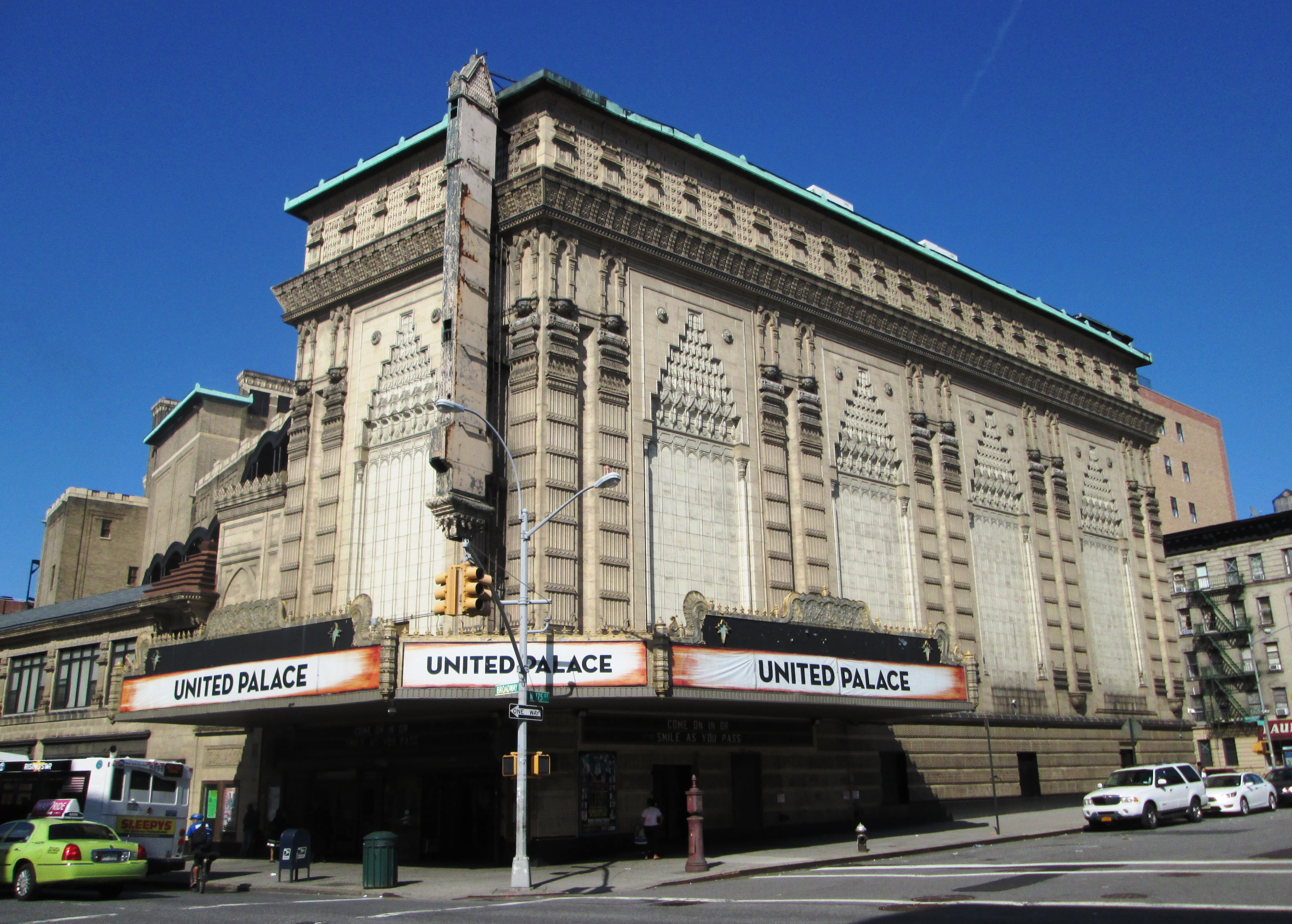
The "Palace Cathedral" is now known as the United Palace (2014). It is used as a live music venue as well as a church, and is still owned by the United Church Evangelistic Association.

Known popularly as "Reverend Ike", his ministry reached its peak in the mid 1970s, when his weekly radio sermons were carried by hundreds of stations across the United States. He was famous for his "Blessing Plan" – radio listeners sent him money and in return he blessed them. He said radio listeners who did this would become more prosperous. He was criticized for his overt interest in financial remuneration. In 1972, The New York Times described his church service:

"Close your eyes and see green," the minister exhorted. "Money up to your armpits, a roomful of money and there you are, just tossing around in it like a swimming pool."

The preacher was the Rev. Frederick J. Eikerenkoetter 2d—better known as "Reverend Ike"—urging several thousand of his devoted parishioners to think positive thoughts.

From the red‐carpeted stage of what was once a Loew's movie palace at 175th Street and Broadway, Reverend Ike evoked giggles from the predominantly black congregation. But they repeated his words obediently during a recent Sunday as, microphone in hand, he sang, "Lots and lots of money, ready for my use, oh yes, it's ready for my use."

Rev. Ike bought the Loew's 175th Street Theatre movie palace in the Washington Heights neighborhood for over half a million dollars, renamed it the "Palace Cathedral" – although colloquially it was known as "Reverend Ike's Prayer Tower" – and had it fully restored. Restorations included the seven-story high, twin chamber Robert Morton organ. The "Miracle Star of Faith", visible from the George Washington Bridge, tops the building's cupola. In 2016, the building was designated as a landmark by the New York City Landmark Commission.

Rev. Ike was also the "chancellor" of the United Church Schools, including the Science of Living Institute and Seminary (which awarded him, his wife, and his son Doctor of the Science of Living degrees); the Business of Living Institute (home of Thinkonomics); and other educational projects.

=== Other activities ===
Ike made a guest appearance on Hank Williams, Jr.'s single "Mind Your Own Business", a number one country music hit in December 1986. This song is Reverend Ike's only chart single.

=== In pop culture ===
In December 2005, John Lennon and Yoko Ono's personal assistant May Pang told Radio Times:

At night he (John Lennon) loved to channel-surf, and he would pick up phrases from all the shows. One time, he was watching Reverend Ike, a famous black evangelist, who was saying, "Let me tell you guys, it doesn't matter, it's whatever gets you through the night." John loved it and said, "I've got to write it down or I'll forget it." He always kept a pad and pen by the bed. That was the beginning of [the song] "Whatever Gets You thru the Night".

The title of Laurie Anderson's instrumental track "If You Can't Talk About it, Point to It (for Ludwig Wittgenstein and Reverend Ike)" references Ike.

The title track to the 1975 Parliament album Chocolate City fancifully imagines a federal government with Black celebrities in positions of power, where Reverend Ike is appointed as the Secretary of the Treasury.

== Personal life and death ==
Ike and his wife, Eula M. Dent, had one son, Xavier Eikerenkoetter. Reverend Ike died in Los Angeles on July 28, 2009, after not fully recovering from a stroke in 2007. He was 74. His son gave a eulogy at his father's memorial service comparing his father to Martin Luther King and Malcolm X – as a "spiritual activist" and a liberator of minds. Xavier subsequently took over the church.
