= Born to Boogie (song) =

Single by Hank Williams Jr.

from the album Born to Boogie
- B-side: "What It Boils Down To"
- Released: June 13, 1987
- Recorded: 1987
- Genre: country rock
- Length: 2:45
- Label: Warner Bros./Curb
- Songwriter(s): Hank Williams Jr.
- Producer(s): Barry Beckett; Hank Williams Jr.; Jim Ed Norman

Hank Williams Jr. singles chronology
"When Something Is Good (Why Does It Change)" (1987)	"Born to Boogie" (1987)	"Heaven Can't Be Found" (1987)

"Born to Boogie" is a song written and recorded by American musician Hank Williams Jr. It was released in June 1987 as the title track and lead single from his album of the same name. It was a number-one hit in both the United States and Canada.

== Cover versions ==
Rock band Lynyrd Skynyrd covered the song from the television special CMT Giants: Hank Williams Jr.

== Charts ==
=== Weekly charts ===
Chart (1987)	Peak position
Canada Country Tracks (RPM)	1
US Hot Country Songs (Billboard)	1

=== Year-end charts ===
Chart (1987)	Position
US Hot Country Songs (Billboard)	46
