= Born to Boogie (album) =

Studio album by Hank Williams Jr.
- Released: July 1987
- Genres: Country Rock; Country
- Length: 32:24
- Label: Warner Bros.
- Producers: Barry Beckett; Carl Marsh; Jim Ed Norman; Hank Williams Jr.

Hank Williams Jr. chronology
Hank Live (1987)	Born to Boogie (1987)	Wild Streak (1988)

Singles from Born to Boogie
- 1. "Born to Boogie" Released: June 13, 1987; 2. "Heaven Can't Be Found" Released: October 1987; 3. "Young Country" Released: February 1988

Professional ratings
Review scores
Source	Rating
Allmusic	4.5/5 stars

Born to Boogie is the fortieth studio album by American musician Hank Williams Jr. It was released by Warner Bros. Records in July 1987. The title track, "Heaven Can't Be Found" and "Young Country" were released as singles. The album reached No. 1 on the Top Country Albums chart and has been certified Platinum by the RIAA. Born to Boogie also won the Country Music Association Album of the Year award in 1988 and the title track earned Williams nominations for the ACM Top Male Vocalist, the CMA Male Vocalist of the Year and the Grammy Award for Best Country Vocal Performance, Male.

== Track listing ==
No.	Title	Writer(s)	Length
1.	"Born to Boogie"	Hank Williams Jr.	2:45
2.	"Honky Tonk Women"	Mick Jagger, Keith Richards	3:04
3.	"Young Country" (featuring Butch Baker, Steve Earle, Highway 101, Dana McVicker, Marty Stuart, Keith Whitley, T. Graham Brown)	Williams	3:32
4.	"Keep Your Hands to Yourself"	Dan Baird	3:38
5.	"Buck Naked"	Williams	3:19
6.	"Heaven Can't Be Found"	Williams	3:14
7.	"Thanks a Lot"	Don Sessions, Eddie Miller	2:55
8.	"What It Boils Down To"	Williams	3:16
9.	"Shadow Face"	Williams	4:21
10.	"Practice What I Preach"	Jim Ed Norman, Williams	2:41

== Personnel ==
- Barry Beckett – keyboards
- Richard Bennett – acoustic guitar
- Matt Betton – drums
- Bekka Bramlett – background vocals
- Ben Cauley – trumpet
- John Cowan – background vocals
- Jim Horn – baritone saxophone
- Wayne Jackson – trumpet
- John Barlow Jarvis – keyboards
- Mike Lawler – synthesizer
- "Cowboy" Eddie Long – steel guitar
- Carl Marsh – Fairlight, Fairlight III, programming
- Jerry McKinney – clarinet
- Terry McMillan – harmonica
- Michael Rhodes – bass guitar
- Charles Rose – trombone
- James Stroud – drums
- Harvey Thompson – tenor saxophone
- Wayne Turner – electric guitar
- Billy Joe Walker Jr. – acoustic guitar
- Hank Williams Jr. – lead vocals
- Reggie Young – electric guitar

Additional vocals on "Young Country"

T. Graham Brown, Butch Baker, Steve Earle, Highway 101, Dana McVicker, Marty Stuart, Keith Whitley

== Charts ==
=== Weekly charts ===
Chart (1987)	Peak position
US Billboard 200	28
US Top Country Albums (Billboard)	1

=== Year-end charts ===
Chart (1987)	Position
US Top Country Albums (Billboard)	29
Chart (1988)	Position
US Top Country Albums (Billboard)	4
Chart (1989)	Position
US Top Country Albums (Billboard)	67

== Certifications ==
Region	Certification	Certified units/sales
United States (RIAA)	Platinum	1,000,000^{^}
^{^} Shipments figures based on certification alone.
