= Bill Lister =

American singer-songwriter

"Big Bill" Lister (January 5, 1923 – December 1, 2009) was an American honky tonk country music singer. Born Weldon E. Lister, he was nicknamed "Radio's Tallest Singing Cowboy," standing over 6-foot-7 without his cowboy boots and hat.

== Life and career ==
During most of 1951, he traveled with Hank Williams, Sr., as the opening act for Williams and his "Drifting Cowboys." As a regular performer on the Grand Ole Opry thereafter, Lister worked with most of the stars of the day, including Little Jimmy Dickens, String Bean, Minnie Pearl, Del Wood, The Carter Family, and others. He was also a recording artist for both Everstate and Capitol Records. He is best known for his ties to Williams' song "There's a Tear in My Beer." Lister recorded the song in 1951, after Williams gave him a demo recording that he realized his record producer would not permit him to record professionally. Nearly four decades later, Lister's wife found the old demo recording in their attic. Shortly after their discovery, Lister gave the recording to Williams' son, Hank Williams, Jr., who soon recorded an overdubbed version of the song in 1988, in which father and son seemed to be singing together (some 40 years apart). In 1989, the dual recording peaked at #7 on Billboard's Hot 100s country chart, as well as a Grammy Award and a Country Music Association Award. The record also served as the sound track of a music video by the same title, which garnered six major awards, including the CMA Vocal Collaboration of the Year, Vocal Event of the Year, and Music Video of the year, the ACM Music Video of the Year, the TNN/MCN Music Video of the Year, and the Country Music Video of the Year. The video utilizes a television kinescope (movie) that captures the elder Williams singing a different song (Hey Good Lookin') that he wrote and recorded with the same time signature but with a faster tempo and, of course, different words. After the video's producer solved both of those problems, he made it appear that the senior Williams was actually performing the song that would appear on the video. After the elder Williams technologically sings the first half of the song as presented in the video, the younger Williams seemingly appears to walk into the picture next to his father, where he joins him in completing the performance.

After leaving professional music in the early '60s, Lister became one of the best firearms engravers of his generation. Other Lister recordings included "RC Cola and a Moon Pie," recorded for Capitol Records in 1951.

Big Bill Lister's return to commercial recording came in 1983 with the album "Sho' 'Nuff Country Stuff! (The Second Time Around)," produced for Slim Richey's Tex-Grass label by D. Lee Thomas and Michael H. Price, with accompaniment by the Salt Lick Foundation, a Texas string band that includes Lister's nephew, Harris Kirby. Lister performed extensively during 1983 in Dallas and Fort Worth with the Salt Lick Foundation and with Michael H. Price and Slim Richey's jazz ensemble, Diddy Wah Diddy.

== Discography ==
Year	Album	Label
1983	Sho' 'Nuff Country Stuff! (The Second Time Around)	Tex-Grass Records
1999	There's a Tear in My Beer	Bear Family
2004	Remembering Hank Williams	Heart of Texas
