= Greatest Hits (John Schneider album) =

Greatest hits album by John Schneider
- Released: 1987
- Genre: Country
- Length: 33:09
- Label: MCA
- Producer: Jimmy Bowen, John Schneider

John Schneider chronology
You Ain't Seen the Last of Me (1987)	Greatest Hits (1987)	Worth the Wait (1996)

Greatest Hits is the first compilation album by American actor and country music artist John Schneider. It was released in 1987 via MCA Records.

== Track listing ==
No.	Title	Writer(s)	Length
1.	"I've Been Around Enough to Know"	Bob McDill, Dickey Lee	2:37
2.	"Country Girls"	Troy Seals, Eddie Setser	3:12
3.	"It's a Short Walk from Heaven to Hell"	Ken Bell, Terry Skinner, J. L. Wallace	3:30
4.	"I'm Gonna Leave You Tomorrow"	Gene Dobbins, Tim Daniels, Johnny Wilson	3:44
5.	"What's a Memory Like You (Doing in a Love Like This)"	Charles Quillen, John Jarrard	3:22
6.	"You're the Last Thing I Needed Tonight"	Don Pfrimmer, David Wills	3:19
7.	"At the Sound of the Tone"	Dave Richardson, Max T. Barnes	3:02
8.	"Take the Long Way Home"	Doug Crider, Johnny Neel	3:16
9.	"Love, You Ain't Seen the Last of Me"	Kendal Franceschi	3:58
10.	"If It Was Anyone but You"	Lisa Silver, Don Schlitz	3:09

== Chart performance ==
Chart (1987)	Peak position
US Top Country Albums (Billboard)	22
