= Hank Williams Jr.'s Greatest Hits, Vol. 2 =

Greatest hits album by Hank Williams Jr.
- Released: 1985
- Genre: Country
- Length: 31:24
- Label: Warner Bros.
- Producers: Jimmy Bowen; Hank Williams Jr. Billy Sherrill

Hank Williams Jr. chronology
Major Moves (1984)	Hank Williams Jr.'s Greatest Hits, Vol. 2 (1985)	Five-O (1985)

Professional ratings
Review scores
Source	Rating
Allmusic	4.5/5 stars

Hank Williams Jr.'s Greatest Hits, Vol. 2 is a compilation album by musician Hank Williams Jr. It was released in 1985 and was Williams' second compilation album on Warner Bros. Records. A critical and commercial success, the album peaked at Number One on the Billboard Top Country Albums chart, the second of his career to do so. The album was also certified Platinum by the RIAA, making it Williams' eleventh album to be certified Gold and the fifth to be certified Platinum. The album features ten tracks, nine of which were Number One or Top 10 songs on the Billboard Hot Country Singles & Tracks chart originally released from the studio albums High Notes, Strong Stuff, Man of Steel and Major Moves. The single "Two Old Cats Like Us" is a duet between Williams and R&B artist Ray Charles that was also featured on Charles' country album of duets, Friendship. The single was a moderate hit, peaking at number 14 on the Hot Country Singles & Tracks chart.

== Track listing ==
All songs written by Hank Williams Jr. except where noted.

No.	Title	Writer(s)	Length
1.	"All My Rowdy Friends Are Coming Over Tonight"		2:55
2.	"Man of Steel"		3:37
3.	"Honky Tonkin'"	Hank Williams	2:13
4.	"The Conversation" (duet with Waylon Jennings)	Hank Williams Jr., Waylon Jennings, Richie Albright	3:48
5.	"Queen of My Heart"		3:45
6.	"Two Old Cats Like Us" (duet with Ray Charles)	Troy Seals	2:40
7.	"Gonna Go Huntin' Tonight"		2:32
8.	"Attitude Adjustment"		2:52
9.	"Major Moves"		3:30
10.	"Leave Them Boys Alone" (featuring Waylon Jennings and Ernest Tubb)	Dean Dillon, Williams Jr., Gary Stewart, Tanya Tucker	3:32

== Chart performance ==
Chart (1985)	Peak position
U.S. Billboard Top Country Albums	1
U.S. Billboard 200	183

== Certifications ==
Region	Certification	Certified units/sales
United States (RIAA)	Platinum	1,000,000^{^}
^{^} Shipments figures based on certification alone.
