= List of Top Country Albums number ones of 1986 =

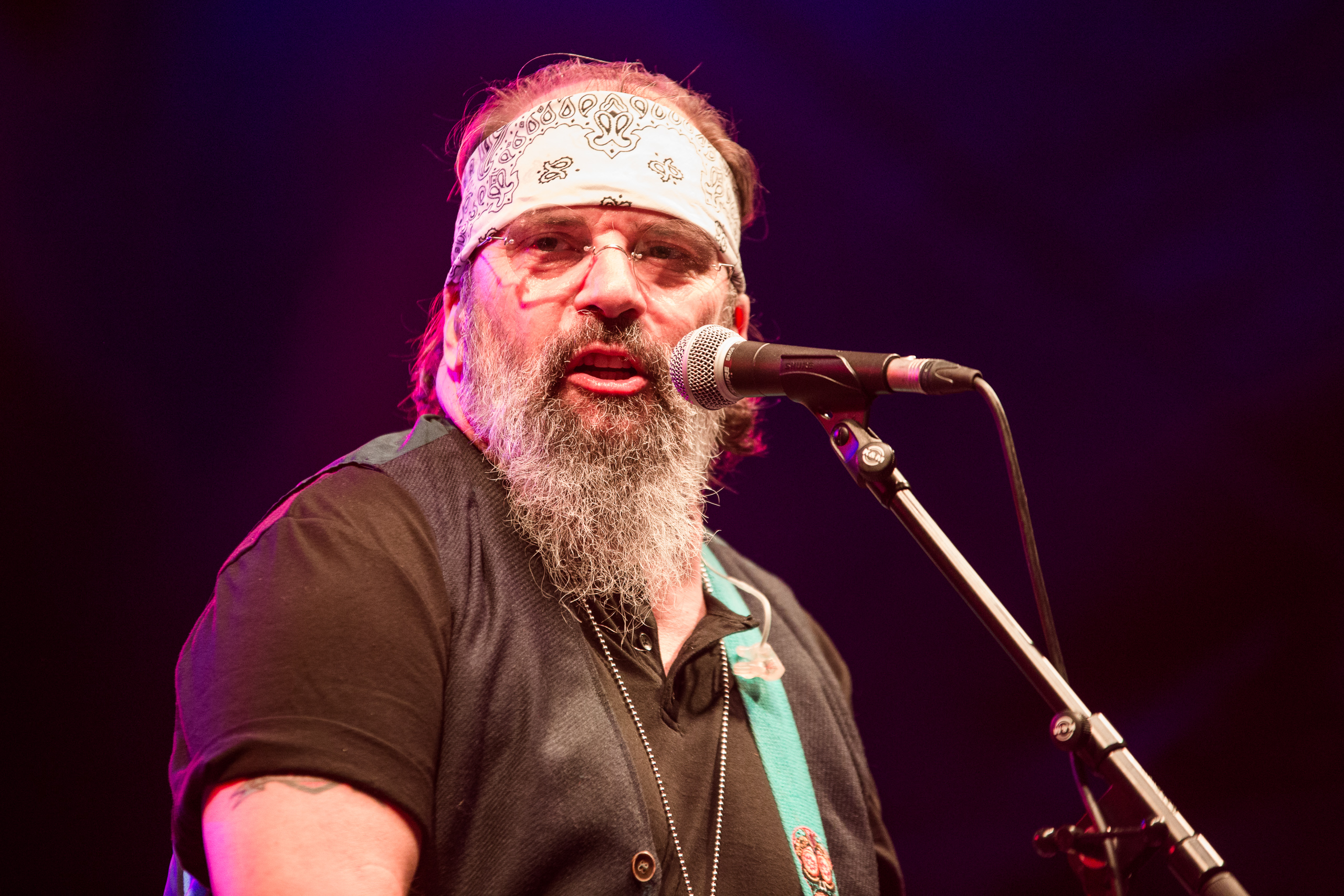
Steve Earle reached number one with his debut album Guitar Town.

Top Country Albums is a chart that ranks the top-performing country music albums in the United States, published by Billboard. In 1986, 22 different albums topped the chart, based on sales reports submitted by a representative sample of stores nationwide.

In the issue of Billboard dated January 4, Kenny Rogers was at number one with the album The Heart of the Matter, its second week in the top spot. It would remain atop the chart through the issue dated February 1 for a final total of six weeks at number one but would prove to be the last of the 11 chart-toppers which the singer achieved in his lifetime; he would top the chart again in 2020 shortly after his death. Many of 1986's chart-topping acts were identified with the neotraditional country trend, which moved away from the pop music-influenced style with which acts such as Rogers had dominated the country charts in the earlier part of the decade in favour of a sound closer to the genre's roots. George Strait, Randy Travis, Dwight Yoakam and Steve Earle were all associated with the neotraditional movement. Travis's album Storms of Life spent eight weeks at number one, the most by an album in 1986. Travis, Yoakam and Earle all reached number one for the first time in 1986, as did Lee Greenwood, Dan Seals, Earl Thomas Conley, John Schneider, Ray Stevens, Janie Fricke and Reba McEntire, who would go on to become one of the most successful female singers in country music history, selling more than 50 million albums.

Two acts achieved more than one number one in 1986. The band Alabama spent five weeks in the top spot beginning in April with Greatest Hits and seven weeks at number one beginning in November with The Touch, which was the year's final chart-topper. The band's total of twelve weeks at number one was the most for any act, and the seven weeks which The Touch spent in the top spot was the year's longest unbroken run at number one; this run would be extended by a further three weeks in 1987. The two albums brought the total number of chart-toppers achieved by the most successful country music band of the 1980s to seven. Hank Williams Jr. had three number ones in 1986, beginning with a two-week spell atop the chart in February with Greatest Hits Volume 2. In May, Five-O, which had been released a year earlier and spent time at number one in the summer of 1985, returned to the top spot for one week. Finally, the singer spent four weeks in the peak position beginning in the issue of Billboard dated September 6 with Montana Cafe. Having not reached number one at all between 1969 and 1984, the second-generation star had now achieved four consecutive chart-toppers in less than three years.

== Chart history ==
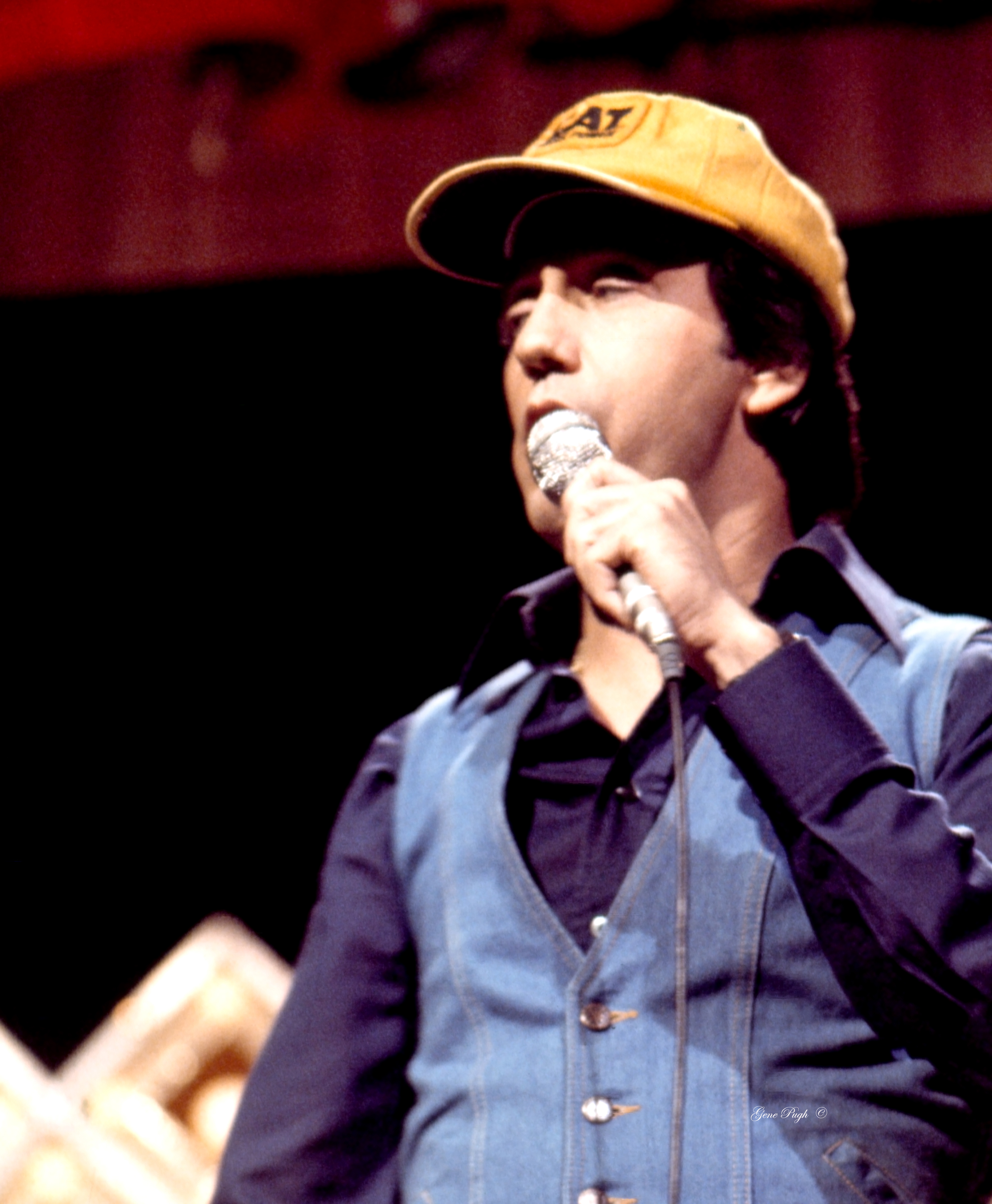
Ray Stevens, who had recorded in various genres since the 1950s, had his first number-one country album in 1986.

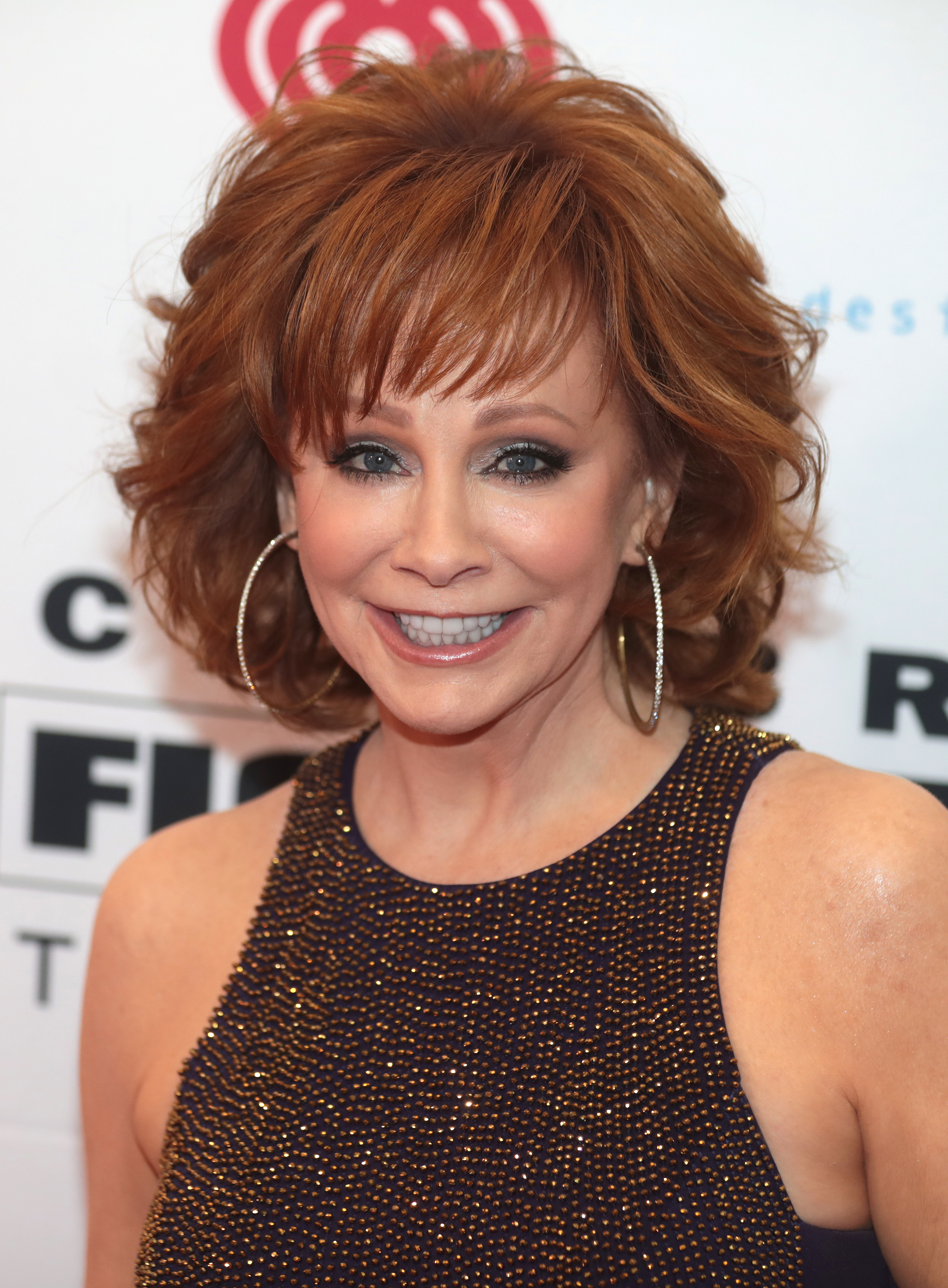
Whoever's in New England was the first chart-topping album for Reba McEntire, one of the most successful female country singers of all time.

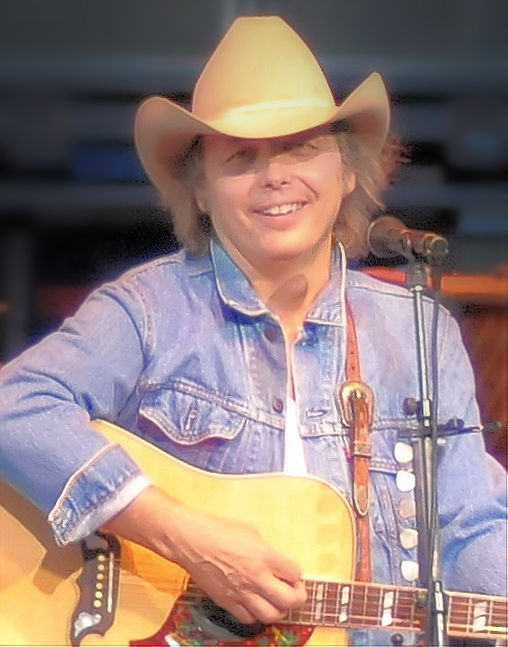
Guitars, Cadillacs, Etc., Etc. was Dwight Yoakam's first number one.

Issue date	Title	Artist(s)	Ref.
January 4	The Heart of the Matter	Kenny Rogers	
January 11	The Heart of the Matter	Kenny Rogers	
January 18	The Heart of the Matter	Kenny Rogers	
January 25	The Heart of the Matter	Kenny Rogers	
February 1	The Heart of the Matter	Kenny Rogers	
February 8	Greatest Hits Volume 2	Hank Williams Jr.	
February 15	Greatest Hits Volume 2	Hank Williams Jr.	
February 22	Streamline	Lee Greenwood	
March 1	Rockin' with the Rhythm	The Judds	
March 8	Won't Be Blue Anymore	Dan Seals	
March 15	I Have Returned	Ray Stevens	
March 22	Greatest Hits	Earl Thomas Conley	
March 29	Live in London	Ricky Skaggs	
April 5	Greatest Hits	Alabama	
April 12	Greatest Hits	Alabama	
April 19	A Memory Like You	John Schneider	
April 26	Greatest Hits	Alabama	
May 3	Greatest Hits	Alabama	
May 10	Greatest Hits	Alabama	
May 17	Five-O	Hank Williams Jr.	
May 24	Whoever's in New England	Reba McEntire	
May 31	The Promiseland	Willie Nelson	
June 7	The Promiseland	Willie Nelson	
June 14	Will the Wolf Survive	Waylon Jennings	
June 21	Lost in the Fifties Tonight	Ronnie Milsap	
June 28	Guitars, Cadillacs, Etc., Etc.	Dwight Yoakam	
July 5	Guitars, Cadillacs, Etc., Etc.	Dwight Yoakam	
July 12	#7	George Strait	
July 19	#7	George Strait	
July 26	#7	George Strait	
August 2	#7	George Strait	
August 9	Storms of Life	Randy Travis	
August 16	Storms of Life	Randy Travis	
August 23	Storms of Life	Randy Travis	
August 30	Storms of Life	Randy Travis	
September 6	Montana Cafe	Hank Williams Jr.	
September 13	Montana Cafe	Hank Williams Jr.	
September 20	Montana Cafe	Hank Williams Jr.	
September 27	Montana Cafe	Hank Williams Jr.	
October 4	Black and White	Janie Fricke	
October 11	Storms of Life	Randy Travis	
October 18	Storms of Life	Randy Travis	
October 25	Storms of Life	Randy Travis	
November 1	Storms of Life	Randy Travis	
November 8	Guitar Town	Steve Earle	
November 15	The Touch	Alabama	
November 22	The Touch	Alabama	
November 29	The Touch	Alabama	
December 6	The Touch	Alabama	
December 13	The Touch	Alabama	
December 20	The Touch	Alabama	
December 27	The Touch	Alabama	
