= All My Rowdy Friends =

All My Rowdy Friends can refer to one of three songs by Hank Williams, Jr.:

- "All My Rowdy Friends (Have Settled Down)" (1981), from the album The Pressure is On
- "All My Rowdy Friends Are Coming Over Tonight" (1984), from the album Major Moves
- "All My Rowdy Friends Are Here on Monday Night" (1989), an adaptation of the 1984 song, theme for Monday Night Football broadcasts
