= Hank Williams Jr.'s Greatest Hits =

Greatest hits album by Hank Williams Jr.
- Released: 1982
- Genre: Outlaw country; country
- Length: 33:10
- Label: Elektra/Curb

Hank Williams Jr. chronology
High Notes (1982)	Hank Williams Jr.'s Greatest Hits (1982)	Strong Stuff (1983)

Professional ratings
Review scores
Source	Rating
Allmusic	5/5 stars

Hank Williams Jr.'s Greatest Hits is a compilation album by American musician Hank Williams Jr. The album features ten tracks, nine of which are singles originally released from the studio albums Family Tradition, Whiskey Bent and Hell Bound, Habits Old and New, Rowdy and The Pressure Is On. The only original single from the album was "The American Dream", which peaked at number 5 on the Billboard Hot Country Singles & Tracks chart.

The album was released by Elektra/Curb Records in 1982 and reached number 4 on the Billboard Top Country Albums chart in January 1983. The album has been Williams' most commercially successful album to date, having been certified 5× Multi-Platinum by the RIAA by 2003. It has sold 3,410,700 copies in the US as of April 2017 in the SoundScan era when sales figure started to be tracked in 1991.

== Track listing ==
All tracks composed by Hank Williams Jr. except where indicated.

No.	Title	Writer(s)	Length
1.	"Family Tradition"		4:02
2.	"Whiskey Bent and Hell Bound"		3:08
3.	"Women I've Never Had"		2:51
4.	"Old Habits"		3:02
5.	"Kaw-Liga"	Fred Rose, Hank Williams	4:23
6.	"Dixie on My Mind"		2:39
7.	"Texas Women"		2:26
8.	"The American Dream"		2:15
9.	"A Country Boy Can Survive"		4:15
10.	"All My Rowdy Friends (Have Settled Down)"		3:54

== Chart performance ==
Chart (1982)	Peak position
US Billboard 200	107
US Top Country Albums (Billboard)	4

== Certifications ==
Region	Certification	Certified units/sales
United States (RIAA)	5× Platinum	5,000,000^{^}
^{^} Shipments figures based on certification alone.
