= Dallas (1978 TV series) in popular culture =

Dallas is an American prime time soap opera that revolves around the Ewings, a wealthy Texas family in the oil and cattle-ranching industries. The show debuted in April 1978 as a five-part miniseries on the CBS network, and then was subsequently broadcast for thirteen seasons from April 2, 1978 to May 3, 1991. It has been a frequent reference in popular culture. At its height it was regarded as cult viewing both in America and in much of the rest of the world. In the communist Soviet Union thousands of people drove regularly to the northern tip of Estonia to pick up the series on Finnish TV.

== In film and television ==
- In the experimental documentary Hotel Dallas, Patrick Duffy takes a surreal tour of Romania, where Dallas played a surprising role in the fall of communism.
- In the DuckTales episode "Ducks of the West", Scrooge McDuck meets up with a cow-cowboy named J.R. Mooing, who is a parody of J.R. Ewing.
- A Season 1 episode of the animated television series Alvin and the Chipmunks, "Grandpa and Grandma Seville", is a parody of the series, with references including the South Spoon Ranch and corrupt oil baron J.B., who seeks to have the ramshackle farm owned by series' protagonist David Seville's parents condemned so he can access a large oil field believed to be on the property.
- On The Parkers, one episode consisted of a Dallas/Dynasty parody.
- In the Only Fools and Horses episode "Who Wants to Be a Millionaire?", after Del Boy and Rodney have an argument about whether Del should go to Australia and become a millionaire or not, Albert believes that his two nephews are feuding just like the Ewing brothers. Del agrees by comparing himself to Bobby, but wouldn't compare Rodney to J.R.
- Bill Haverchuck, a main character in the television series Freaks and Geeks mentions watching Dallas in multiple episodes. The show Dallas also plays a significant role, in episode number fourteen, "Dead Dogs and Gym Teachers".
- In the That '70s Show episode "Love, Wisconsin Style", Eric (Topher Grace) sees Donna (Laura Prepon) drunk during the day and tells the guys, "It was like Sue Ellen on Dallas."
- In the Hungarian language dub of the Star Trek: The Next Generation episode "The Neutral Zone", Sonny Clemonds, a 20th-century Human revived after being cryogenically frozen upon his death in the 1990s, mistakes a viewscreen for a television and asks, "Is Dallas still on the air? I bet they're doing at least the 1000th episode.", replacing the original inquiry about the Atlanta Braves in the belief that this reference would be lost on an audience unfamiliar with baseball.
- In the 1985 episode of Terry and June, a Swedish businessman wishes to watch a program on Swedish television. Terry foolishly tells Sir Dennis he has a satellite dish (which he doesn't) and Sir Dennis tells him the Swedish businessman will be watching the program at Terry's house. After Terry borrows a satellite from a builders brother and while trying to adjust it so it can receive Swedish television there is an incident which ends with the satellite (attached to scaffolding on wheels) crashing into Sir Dennis' car, dragging the television behind it. They manage to fix the satellite and it turns out the Swedish businessman wanted Dallas which was broadcast on BBC 1.
- In the mid-1990s, Nike produced some commercials featuring the Dallas Cowboys after Deion Sanders joined the team, using the Dallas theme (as well as notable Cowboy personalities Roger Staubach and owner Jerry Jones) to help promote Deion, the Cowboys, and Nike. In one ad Jones and coach Barry Switzer implore Sanders into a game against the Redskins.
- A 1992-episode of the German puppet series Hallo Spencer is entitled Wir spielen Dolles (We play Dolles - a reference to the more German pronunciation to the word Dallas), in which the puppets from the show spoof an episode of Dallas. The characters playing parody characters Pay R. Chewing, Lu Ellen Chewing, Bibbi Chewing, Pommela Chewing, Cloff Burns, Dr. Lexington, etc.
- In the 2012 Australian TV miniseries Bikie Wars: Brothers in Arms, Comanchero commander Jock Ross and his then-offsider Snoddy Spencer reference the show while planning a bashing in episode 1; Jock Ross is planning a retaliation bashing on a rival gang who fired on a fellow Comanchero and 2 associates, he originally plans the attack for a Wednesday night, but then decides not to go on the Wednesday, as Snoddy reminds him that Dallas is playing on television on Wednesday night; they opt to carry out the attack on Tuesday night instead.
- A German movie is titled Am Tag als Bobby Ewing starb ("The day Bobby Ewing died").
- An episode of The Jeffersons from the series' seventh season is titled "As Florence Turns". In that episode, the Jeffersons' longtime housekeeper Florence Johnston writes a script for a story titled "Who Shot GR?". The story is about a ruthless cleaning store tycoon named George Rotten (GR) who treats everybody around him horribly. While he is alone in his apartment celebrating his wickedness, he is shot and critically wounded (or so we think).

== In songs/music videos ==
- In his 1987 song "Posse on Broadway", Sir Mix-a-Lot refers to himself with regards to the other local MCs as, "The man they love to hate, the J.R. Ewing of Seattle".
- Mentioned in The Message by hip hop DJ Grandmaster Flash as, "My brother's doing bad, stole my mother's TV / Says she watches too much / It's just not healthy / All My Children in the daytime, Dallas at night / Can’t even see the game or the Sugar Ray fight".
- Swedish group ABBA's final recording "The Day Before You Came" (1982) relates the story of a mundane day in the life of an ordinary woman in the suburbs. The song incorporates the lines "I must have had my dinner watching something on TV / There's not I think a single episode of Dallas that I didn't see." This grammatically challenging lyric may have been partially biographical as it was reported in the UK press that ABBA member Agnetha Faltskog (who performed the song) was dating one of the Dallas producers and had been offered a part in the series. She never appeared in the show. When British group Blancmange released their version of the song on single in 1984, the picture sleeve included a picture of a shot JR on a TV screen.
- Ozzy Osbourne, in 1986 made a music video for the song "The Ultimate Sin" loosely based on Dallas. Ozzy played J.R. Ewing and his company was called Ozzy Oil.
- In the song "Live Television", the Senegalese singer Youssou N'Dour describes how during a visit to a friend's house he was left alone in the living room waiting for dinner while his hosts all packed in a small room to watch the show on television.
- On George Strait's debut album "Strait Country" (1981), in the song "Friday Night Fever", the lyrics are: "I love the sound of a jukebox playing, so I sit here while she's staying home, watching Dallas on TV."
- On Estelle's debut album "The 18th Day" (2004), in the song "1980" the lyrics are: "So then we moved up, I thought I was the Fresh Prince, Dynasty was re-runs and Dallas was faded."
- Hank Williams, Jr. had a single called "This Ain't Dallas" which is on his album Five-O. The song also mentioned the popular soap opera Dynasty.
- Floyd Cramer had a single released in 1980, called "Dallas", on the Dallas album. On that same album were his renditions of the theme songs from The Waltons, Little House on the Prairie, Taxi, Knots Landing and others.
- Country singer B.J. Wright recorded a tribute song to the J.R. Ewing character with the song "J.R."; released shortly after the episode "A House Divided" in the spring of 1980, the song reached No. 32 on the Billboard Hot Country Singles chart.
- On Pulp's hit "Bad Cover Version", a relationship the narrator believes is doomed to fail is compared to "the last days of Southfork".
- The German indie band "Cliff Barnes and the Fear of Winning" is named after Cliff Barnes.
- In the Black Flag song "TV Party", Dallas is one of the shows mentioned.

== Opening title sequence ==
- For the 2007 NHL All-Star Game which was held in Dallas at the American Airlines Center, CBC's opening was a spoof of Dallas' opening, using the same 1980s font and names like Sidney Crosby, Alexander Ovechkin, and Joe Thornton.
- In a 2007 episode of America's Got Talent in which the show went to Dallas for auditions, the episode began with the original Dallas theme and presented the three judges as the "stars" in a similar format to the introduction of Dallas.
- CBS Sports also used a Dallas musical theme for the opening of its 1991 NFL Wild Card playoff between the Cowboys and Bears. It featured the 3 way split screen common to Dallas openings and introduced "characters" Jimmy Johnson, Emmitt Smith, Michael Irvin, Troy Aikman, and Steve Beuerlein. Pat Summerall narrated.
- In The Young Ones episode Time, the opening sequence and credits parody Dallas. Neil (Nigel Planer) is E.T., a hippy version of J.R. who donates all business assets to "the Brothers of the Soil Commune".
- In the last two seasons of The Drew Carey Show, one of the opening montages is an homage to the opening of Dallas, containing Cleveland references.
- The theme song of the show itself has entered pop culture. It has been remixed by Crazy Frog, and used in a sample game in Sun Microsystems' Java MIDP software development kit.
- An arrangement of the theme from Dallas was used as the score for a short film about vice-presidential nominee, Alaskan Governor Sarah Palin and played at the 2008 Republican National Convention on September 4, 2008.
- The introductory scene of Nutty Acres in Banjo-Kazooie: Nuts and Bolts parodies the opening of the series.
- During the 1994 FIFA World Cup, BBC Sport did a Dallas title sequence for the Brazil v Netherlands match at the Cotton Bowl which featured the stars of the match in alphabetical order such as Bebeto, Bergkamp, and Romário rather than the stars of the show.
- BBC Northern Ireland also did a Dallas inspired title sequence for their own sports programme Season Ticket, whenever they did a biography about former Northern Ireland international footballer turned Dallas Burn (now FC Dallas) coach Steve Morrow.

== "Who Shot J.R.?" ==
=== Contemporary ===
- The "Who Shot J.R.?" episode entered into American popular culture, with t-shirts printed with such references as "Who shot J.R.?" and "I Shot J.R.!" becoming common throughout the summer of 1980. The cliffhanger was also referenced in The Fresh Prince of Bel-Air episode "As the Will Turns"; when Will was trying to get fired from a television show via a ridiculous monologue that incorporated elements from numerous TV shows, he says that he's "the guy who shot J.R."
- Charlene Tilton hosted an episode of Saturday Night Live (which Larry Hagman had turned down) centered around the "shooting" of Charles Rocket, in which Rocket says, "I'd like to know who the fuck did it." For his use of the profanity, he was fired.
- During the mania surrounding "Who shot J.R.?", Happy Days aired an episode in which the Fonz (Henry Winkler) was shot in the behind. Three different versions of the incident come forward, with the one told by Roger (Ted McGinley) being the most accurate. Fonzie, Chachi (Scott Baio), Roger and Potsie (Anson Williams) have gone camping. Fonzie and Chachi are at odds with Roger and Potsie trying to restore order. When Potsie intervenes, Fonzie tells him to mind his own business and shoves him hard enough that he hits the mantelpiece above the fireplace. This dislodges a mounted rifle, which discharges upon hitting the floor. Thus, the shooting is determined to have been an accident.
- The episode was first broadcast in Finland on 12 November 1982. The tabloid Ilta-Sanomat lacked a suitable real-life news item to print on the headline poster on said day, so managing editor Raimo Toivonen chose the contents of the episode as a headline. Another headline immediately below reported Ronald Reagan's inability to attend Leonid Brezhnev's funeral due to time constraints, which led to the unintentionally comical combination Tänään tv:ssä J.R. ammutaan / Reagan ei ehdi hautajaisiin ("Today on TV J.R. is shot / Reagan can't make it to the funeral"). This was also the first time a fictional character had appeared on the headline poster of a tabloid in Finland, and numerous copies of it were stolen as pieces of memorabilia.

=== Later ===
- During a scene in The Wedding Singer, Frank Sivero, who plays Andy, refuses to leave the living room and says, "Hang on! I'm watching Dallas! I think J.R. might be dead or something! They shot him!"
- The Jeffersons also had a Dallas parody through a script written by Florence, the maid. The cast was George as G.R. Jenkins, Louise as Lou Weezy Jenkins, Helen as Ellen Wallis, Tom as Tim Wallis, Lionel as Leon Jenkins, and Jenny as Jannice Wallis Jenkins. There is even a scene in which G.R. is shot but fakes his coma to draw out the assailant—Florence as Flossie.
- In the Irish sitcom Father Ted, one of the locals, Tom, on Craggy Island constantly wears a shirt that reads "I Shot J.R." and repeatedly says, "I killed a man, Father" to Father Ted Crilly.
- The Simpsons episode "Who Shot Mr. Burns?" parodies "Who shot J.R.?" A deleted scene in "Bart vs. Australia" also includes a reference when one of the court members shouts, "Don't tell us who shot J.R.!" whilst covering his ears. In another episode, "I Married Marge", Homer is briefly seen wearing a shirt saying "I shot J.R.".
- Desperate Housewives paid homage to this storyline in Season 7's midseason cliffhanger. As main antagonist Paul Young was shot, just about everyone on Wisteria Lane ended up being suspects.
- The Friends episode "The One with Phoebe's Rats" shows Chandler watching the show during a period of his unemployment. After hearing the gunshot he exclaims: "Who shot J.R.?" After which he says: "I have got to get a job..."

== Season 9 (the "Dream Season") ==
- In the Family Guy episode "Da Boom" (1999), the Y2K virus changes civilization for the worse. In a parody of the "Blast from the Past" episode climax from 1986, Victoria Principal and Patrick Duffy reprise their roles as Pam and Bobby respectively in a live-action sequence at the end of the episode, when Pam wakes up and tells Bobby, who is in the shower, that she just dreamt about the strangest episode of Family Guy. Bobby comforts her, pauses, then asks, "What's Family Guy?"
- Introducing Saturday Night Live's 1986–1987 season, Madonna, who hosted the first episode of the dismally rated 1985–1986 season, read a statement from NBC that claimed the previous season of SNL was "all a dream, a horrible, horrible dream."
- During the episode of Night Court entitled "Her Honor: Part 2", Judge Harold T. Stone is removed from the bench. Christine Sullivan, the Public Defender, tries to persuade him to fight for his job, he retorts with: "Like What? Like it turns out I'm on Dallas and I've been dreaming all of this!?"
- The show Reno 911! sometimes references Dallas by having a character dream some event that happened on a previous episode, notably at the end of the season.
- The final episode of Newhart revealed the entire series was Bob Hartley's (the character that Bob Newhart played on The Bob Newhart Show) dream.
- In 2000, Denise van Outen returned to present the British morning television show The Big Breakfast, which she had left previously in 1998. To open the show, van Outen and co-host Johnny Vaughan parodied the Dallas shower scene.
- Parodying the JR plot line when Smithers (The Simpsons) dreams that Mr. Burns was not really shot and is in the shower. In the same series episode "Pygmoelian", it is alluded to when Moe plans revenge at being written out of a show, but discovers too late that his character was only meant to die in a dream.
- In the Phineas and Ferb episode, "Phineas and Ferb Get Busted!" (2009), Candace waking up and discovering that busting Phineas and Ferb and trying to rescue them was all just a dream is a reference to Pam Ewing waking up and discovering that her husband, Bobby is killed was all just a dream. Perry the Platypus also had the same reference at the end of the episode.
- In the Married... with Children episode "Al Bundy, Shoe Dick", the ending reveals that the events of that episode as well as the previous episodes going to the beginning of Season 6, namely the pregnancies of Peg Bundy and Marcy D'Arcy were all a dream sequence of protagonist Al Bundy. This was necessary as actress Katey Sagal, who played Peg, and whose real-life pregnancy was written into the show, suffered a miscarriage.
