= The American Dream (song) =

Single by Hank Williams Jr.

from the album Hank Williams Jr.'s Greatest Hits
- B-side: "If Heaven Ain't a Lot Like Dixie"
- Released: September 20, 1982
- Genre: Country
- Length: 2:19
- Label: Elektra/Curb
- Songwriter(s): Hank Williams Jr.
- Producer(s): Jimmy Bowen

Hank Williams Jr. singles chronology
"Honky Tonkin'" (1982)	"The American Dream" (1982)	"Gonna Go Huntin' Tonight" (1983)

"The American Dream" is a song written and recorded by American country music artist Hank Williams Jr. It was released in September 1982 as the first single from his compilation album Hank Williams Jr.'s Greatest Hits. The song reached number 5 on the Billboard Hot Country Singles & Tracks chart.

== Chart performance ==
Chart (1982)	Peak position
US Hot Country Songs (Billboard)	5
