= Max Barnes =

Max Barnes may refer to:

- Max D. Barnes (1936–2004), American country music singer and songwriter
- Max T. Barnes (born 1962), his son, American country music singer, songwriter, studio musician and producer
