= Take the Long Way Home (album) =

Studio album by John Schneider
- Released: 1986
- Genre: Country
- Length: 30:36
- Label: MCA
- Producer: Jimmy Bowen, John Schneider

John Schneider chronology
A Memory Like You (1985)	Take the Long Way Home (1986)	You Ain't Seen the Last of Me (1987)

Singles from Take the Long Way Home
- 1. "At the Sound of the Tone" Released: August 30, 1986; 2. "Take the Long Way Home" Released: December 20, 1986

Take the Long Way Home is the eighth studio album by American actor and country music artist John Schneider. It was released in 1986 via MCA Records. The includes the singles "At the Sound of the Tone" and "Take the Long Way Home.

== Track listing ==
No.	Title	Writer(s)	Length
1.	"At the Sound of the Tone"	Dave Richardson, Max T. Barnes	3:02
2.	"The Broken Promise Land"	Bill Rice, Sharon Vaughn	3:06
3.	"She's Ready for Someone to Love Her"	Jerry Gillespie, Tommy Rocco, Charlie Black	2:47
4.	"Sounds Like Something I Would Say"	John Barlow Jarvis, Don Cook	2:31
5.	"Better Class of Losers"	Harlan Howard, Ron Peterson	2:50
6.	"Gettin' Even"	Sam Hogin, Dave Gillon, Gordon Payne	3:04
7.	"The Auction"	Don Goodman, Mark Sherrill, Bill Lancaster, Claude Hendricks	3:08
8.	"This Time"	John Schneider, Steve Mason	3:30
9.	"Just When"	Alan Rhody, Bill Caswell	3:21
10.	"Take the Long Way Home"	Doug Crider, Johnny Neel	3:17

== Personnel ==
Adapted from liner notes.

- Matt Betton – drums
- Larry Byrom – electric guitar, slide guitar
- Johnny Cash – additional vocals on "Better Class of Losers"
- Emory Gordy Jr. – bass guitar
- John Barlow Jarvis – piano, synthesizer
- Waylon Jennings – additional vocals on "Better Class of Losers"
- Mike Lawler – synthesizer
- John Schneider – lead vocals, background vocals
- Lisa Silver – fiddle
- Billy Joe Walker Jr. – acoustic guitar
- Curtis "Mr. Harmony" Young – background vocals
- Reggie Young – electric guitar

== Chart performance ==
Chart (1986)	Peak position
US Top Country Albums (Billboard)	17
