= Tryin' to Outrun the Wind =

Studio album by John Schneider
- Released: 1985
- Genre: Country
- Length: 32:57
- Label: MCA
- Producer: Jimmy Bowen, John Schneider

John Schneider chronology
Too Good to Stop Now (1984)	Tryin' to Outrun the Wind (1985)	A Memory Like You (1985)

Singles from Tryin' to Outrun the Wind
- 1. "It's a Short Walk from Heaven to Hell" Released: April 20, 1985; 2. "I'm Gonna Leave You Tomorrow" Released: August 10, 1985

Tryin' to Outrun the Wind is the sixth studio album by American actor and country music artist John Schneider. It was released in 1985 via MCA Records. The album includes the singles "It's a Short Walk from Heaven to Hell" and "I'm Gonna Leave You Tomorrow".

== Track listing ==
No.	Title	Writer(s)	Length
1.	"It's a Short Walk from Heaven to Hell"	Ken Bell, Terry Skinner, J. L. Wallace	3:20
2.	"I'm Gonna Leave You Tomorrow"	Gene Dobbins, Tim Daniels, Johnny Wilson	3:43
3.	"He's Back in Texas"	Troy Seals, Wood Newton	2:37
4.	"Say Hello to Goodbye"	Tom Kimmel	3:00
5.	"Why Did You Say I Do to Me"	Sonny Curtis	3:10
6.	"Tryin' to Outrun the Wind"	Tom Davey, Seals, Eddie Setser	3:36
7.	"Leavin's Been Comin' (For a Long, Long, Time)"	Joe Allen, Dave Kirby, Sonny Throckmorton	3:03
8.	"I Don't Feel Much Like a Cowboy Tonight"	Tom Shapiro, Michael Garvin, Bucky Jones	2:34
9.	"Bad Case of Love"	Curtis	3:14
10.	"Honeymoon Wine"	Bruce Channel, Kieran Kane	3:42

== Personnel ==
Adapted from liner notes.

- Matt Betton – drums
- Michael Black – background vocals
- Larry Byrom – guitar
- Thom Flora – background vocals
- Hoot Hester – fiddle
- John Barlow Jarvis – keyboards
- Terry Mead – trumpet
- Larry Muhoberac – keyboards
- Tom Robb – bass guitar
- John Schneider – lead vocals, background vocals
- Curtis Young – background vocals
- Reggie Young – guitar

== Chart performance ==
Chart (1985)	Peak position
US Top Country Albums (Billboard)	15
