= When the Right One Comes Along =

Single by John Schneider

from the album You Ain't Seen the Last of Me
- B-side: "The Gunfighter"
- Released: July 18, 1987
- Genre: Country
- Length: 4:53
- Label: MCA
- Songwriter(s): Russell Smith, John Hooker
- Producer(s): Jimmy Bowen, John Schneider

John Schneider singles chronology
| "Love, You Ain't Seen the Last of Me" (1987) | "When the Right One Comes Along" (1987) | "If It Was Anyone but You" (1987) |

"When the Right One Comes Along" is a song recorded by actor and American country music artist John Schneider. It was released in July 1987 as the second single from the album You Ain't Seen the Last of Me. The song reached #32 on the Billboard Hot Country Singles & Tracks chart. The song was written by Russell Smith and John Hooker.

== Chart performance ==
| Chart (1987) | Peak position |
|---|---|
| US Hot Country Songs (Billboard) | 32 |
| Canadian RPM Country Tracks | 35 |
