= You Ain't Seen the Last of Me =

Studio album by John Schneider
- Released: 1987
- Genre: Country
- Length: 37:02
- Label: MCA
- Producer: Jimmy Bowen, John Schneider

John Schneider chronology
Take the Long Way Home (1986)	You Ain't Seen the Last of Me (1987)	Greatest Hits (1987)

Singles from You Ain't Seen the Last of Me
- 1. "Love, You Ain't Seen the Last of Me" Released: April 4, 1987; 2. "When the Right One Comes Along" Released: July 18, 1987; 3. "If It Was Anyone but You" Released: November 1987

You Ain't Seen the Last of Me is the ninth studio album by American actor and country music artist John Schneider. It was released in 1987 via MCA Records. The album includes singles "Love, You Ain't Seen the Last of Me", "When the Right One Comes Along" and "If It Was Anyone but You".

== Track listing ==
No.	Title	Writer(s)	Length
1.	"I Lost My Head Last Night"	Jim Sales, Phil Thomas, Ronny Scaife	2:47
2.	"So Good"	Bruce Channel, Don Cook	3:36
3.	"When the Right One Comes Along"	Russell Smith, James Hooker	4:48
4.	"Angelena"	John Barafato	4:25
5.	"If It Was Anyone but You"	Lisa Silver, Don Schlitz	3:08
6.	"Hillbilly Boy with the Rock 'n' Roll Blues"	Mark Collie, Scaife	3:27
7.	"Credit"	John Schneider, Larry Boone	2:56
8.	"The Gunfighter"	Schneider	4:26
9.	"A Redneck is the Backbone of America"	Tom Shapiro, Chris Waters, Bucky Jones	3:21
10.	"Love, You Ain't Seen the Last of Me"	Kendal Franceschi	3:58

== Personnel ==
Adapted from liner notes.

- Matt Betton – drums
- Larry Byrom – electric guitar
- Emory Gordy Jr. – bass guitar
- John Barlow Jarvis – keyboards, piano, synthesizer
- Mike Lawler – keyboards, synthesizer
- Terry McMillan – harmonica
- Fred Newell – electric guitar
- John Schneider – lead vocals, background vocals, electric guitar
- Billy Joe Walker Jr. – acoustic guitar, electric guitar
- Curtis "Mr. Harmony" Young – background vocals
- Reggie Young – electric guitar

== Chart performance ==
Chart (1987)	Peak position
US Top Country Albums (Billboard)	41
