= I'm for Love =

Single by Hank Williams Jr.

from the album Five-O
- B-side: "Lawyers, Guns and Money"
- Released: May 11, 1985
- Genre: Country
- Length: 2:55
- Label: Warner Bros./Curb
- Songwriter(s): Hank Williams Jr.
- Producer(s): Jimmy Bowen, Hank Williams Jr.

Hank Williams Jr. singles chronology
"Major Moves" (1985)	"I'm for Love" (1985)	"This Ain't Dallas" (1985)

"I'm for Love" is a song by American singer-songwriter and musician Hank Williams Jr. It was released in May 1985 as the first single from the album Five-O. The single was Williams Jr.'s seventh number one on the country chart. The single went to number one for one week and spent a total of fifteen weeks on the country chart. The A-side was written by Williams. The B-side is a cover of Warren Zevon's song "Lawyers, Guns and Money".

== Charts ==
=== Weekly charts ===
Chart (1985)	Peak position
US Hot Country Songs (Billboard)	1
Canadian RPM Country Tracks	5

=== Year-end charts ===
Chart (1985)	Position
US Hot Country Songs (Billboard)	7
