= Major Moves =

Studio album by Hank Williams Jr.
- Released: May 1984
- Length: 35:02
- Label: Warner Bros.
- Producer: Jimmy Bowen; Hank Williams Jr.

Hank Williams Jr. chronology
Man of Steel (1983)	Major Moves (1984)	Hank Williams Jr.’s Greatest Hits, Vol. 2 (1985)

Singles from Major Moves
- 1. "Attitude Adjustment" Released: June 11, 1984; 2. "All My Rowdy Friends Are Coming Over Tonight" Released: October 1, 1984; 3. "Major Moves" Released: January 19, 1985

Major Moves is the thirty-seventh studio album by American musician Hank Williams Jr. It was released by Warner Bros. Records in May 1984. “Attitude Adjustment,” “All My Rowdy Friends Are Coming Over Tonight” and the title track were released as singles. The album reached No. 1 on the Top Country Albums chart and has been certified Platinum by the RIAA.

“All My Rowdy Friends Are Coming Over Tonight”, which would become a hit in its own right, is now best known to football fans as the song Williams would remake as “Are You Ready For Some Football?” for Monday Night Football.

“Promises” was previously recorded by Eric Clapton on his 1978 album Backless.

== Commercial and critical success ==
Major Moves was a significant success for Williams, becoming his first album to reach number one on the Billboard Top Country Albums chart since the 1960s. It also became his eleventh album to be certified Gold and third to be certified Platinum by the RIAA. Williams received a number of prestigious music industry awards during this time, including winning the inaugural Country Music Association and Academy of Country Music awards for Music Video of the Year for “All My Rowdy Friends Are Coming Over Tonight”. The ACM also nominated Williams for Top Male Vocalist, his third nomination for the award, and he received his first nomination for CMA Male Vocalist of the Year. “All My Rowdy Friends Are Coming Over Tonight” became one of Williams’ signature songs and earned him two Grammy nominations, one for Best Country Song and one for Best Country Vocal Performance, Male.

== Track listing ==
1. “All My Rowdy Friends Are Coming Over Tonight” (Hank Williams Jr.) – 2:57
2. “Promises” (Richard Feldman, Roger Linn) – 3:00
3. “Video Blues” (Williams) – 2:54
4. “Major Moves” (Williams) – 3:34
5. “Blues Medley: My Starter Won’t Start This Morning; Hold Up Your Head; One Kind Favor; Trouble in Mind (feat. John Lee Hooker & Ray Charles)” (Lightnin’ Hopkins, Elmore James, Blind Lemon Jefferson, Richard M. Jones) – 5:41
6. “Mr. Lincoln” (Jimmy Bowen, Williams) – 4:17
7. “Country Relaxin’” (Williams) – 2:36
8. “Attitude Adjustment” (Williams) – 2:56
9. “Knoxville Courthouse Blues” (Williams) – 3:41
10. “Wild and Blue” (John Scott Sherrill) – 3:30

== Personnel ==
- Matt Betton – drums
- Dickey Betts – slide guitar
- Mark Casstevens – banjo, tenor banjo
- Ray Charles – piano, electric piano, and vocals on track 5
- Vernon Derrick – fiddle, mandolin
- Bessyl Duhon – concertina
- Ray Edenton – acoustic guitar
- Hoot Hester – fiddle
- John Lee Hooker – vocals on track 5
- David Hungate – bass guitar
- John Barlow Jarvis – keyboards
- Irving Kane – trombone
- “Cowboy” Eddie Long – steel guitar
- Jerry McKinney – clarinet, soprano saxophone, tenor saxophone
- Terry McMillan – harmonica
- Terry Mead – trumpet
- Kenny Mims – acoustic guitar
- Farrell Morris – maracas, marimba, percussion
- Lamar Morris – acoustic guitar, electric guitar
- Gove Scrivenor – autoharp
- Randy Scruggs – dobro, acoustic guitar
- James Stroud – percussion
- Bobby Thompson – banjo
- Steve Tillisch – background vocals
- Wayne Turner – acoustic guitar, electric guitar
- Billy Joe Walker Jr. – acoustic guitar, electric guitar
- Hank Williams Jr. – dobro, electric guitar, keyboards, lead vocals
- Reggie Young – electric guitar

== Charts ==
=== Weekly charts ===
Chart (1984)	Peak position
Canadian Country Albums (RPM)	20
US Billboard 200	100
US Top Country Albums (Billboard)	1

=== Year-end charts ===
Chart (1984)	Position
US Top Country Albums (Billboard)	13
Chart (1985)	Position
US Top Country Albums (Billboard)	23

== Certifications ==
Region	Certification	Certified units/sales
United States (RIAA)	Platinum	1,000,000^{^}
^{^} Shipments figures based on certification alone.
