= Man of Steel (Hank Williams Jr. song) =

Single by Hank Williams Jr.

from the album Man of Steel
- B-side: "Now I Know How George Feels"
- Released: February 18, 1984
- Genre: Country
- Length: 4:38 (Album Version) 3.40 (Greatest Hits Vol 2 Version)
- Label: Warner Bros./Curb
- Songwriter: Hank Williams Jr.
- Producers: Jimmy Bowen, Hank Williams Jr.

Hank Williams Jr. singles chronology
"The Conversation" (1983)	"Man of Steel" (1984)	"Attitude Adjustment" (1984)

"Man of Steel" is a song written and recorded by American singer-songwriter and musician Hank Williams Jr. It was released in February 1984 as the second single and title track from the album Man of Steel. The song reached #3 on the Billboard Hot Country Singles & Tracks chart.

"Man of Steel" also appears on the compilation album Hank Williams Jr.'s Greatest Hits, Vol. 2. This however is an alternate take with the second verse removed from the original album version. The resulting track is almost one full minute shorter than the original.

== Chart performance ==
Chart (1984)	Peak position
US Hot Country Songs (Billboard)	3
Canadian RPM Country Tracks	4
