= Too Good to Stop Now (John Schneider album) =

Studio album by John Schneider
- Released: 1984
- Studio: Sound Stage Studios, Nashville, TN
- Genre: Country
- Length: 26:47
- Label: MCA
- Producer: Jimmy Bowen, John Schneider

John Schneider chronology
If You Believe (1983)	Too Good to Stop Now (1984)	Tryin' to Outrun the Wind (1985)

Singles from Too Good to Stop Now
- 1. "I've Been Around Enough to Know" Released: July 1984; 2. "Country Girls" Released: December 1984

Too Good to Stop Now is the fifth studio album by American actor and country music artist John Schneider. It was released in 1984 via MCA Records. The album includes the singles "I've Been Around Enough to Know" and "Country Girls".

== Track listing ==
No.	Title	Writer(s)	Length
1.	"I've Been Around Enough to Know"	Bob McDill, Dickey Lee	2:37
2.	"What'll You Do About Me"	Dennis Linde	2:20
3.	"Country Girls"	Troy Seals, Eddie Setser	3:11
4.	"Low Class Reunion"	Sterling Whipple	2:48
5.	"Too Good to Stop Now"	McDill, Rory Bourke	2:49
6.	"The Time of My Life"	Jonmark Stone, Judy Mehaffey	3:32
7.	"Trouble"	Gary Morris, Setser	2:44
8.	"The Party of the First Part"	Sonny Curtis, Ron Hellard	2:58
9.	"I'm Your Man"	Troy Seals, Max D. Barnes	3:08
10.	"Hollywood Heroes"	Mike Reid, Seals, Setser	3:40

== Personnel ==
Adapted from liner notes.

- Electric Guitar: Billy Joe Walker Jr., Larry Rolando
- Acoustic Guitar: Billy Joe Walker Jr.
- Bass Guitar: Tom Robb
- Drums: Matt Betton
- Keyboards: John Barlow Jarvis
- Viola: Buddy Spicher
- Trombone: Rex Peer
- Clarinet: John Gore
- Trumpet: Terry Mead
- Background Vocals: Bill Lamb, Thom Flora
- Lead Vocals, Vocal Harmonies: John Schneider

== Chart performance ==
Chart (1984)	Peak position
US Billboard 200	111
US Top Country Albums (Billboard)	4
