= Take the Long Way Home (John Schneider song) =

Single by John Schneider

from the album Take the Long Way Home
- B-side: "Better Class of Losers"
- Released: December 20, 1986
- Genre: Country
- Length: 3:19
- Label: MCA
- Songwriter(s): Doug Crider, Johnny Neel
- Producer(s): Jimmy Bowen, John Schneider

John Schneider singles chronology
"At the Sound of the Tone" (1986)	"Take the Long Way Home" (1986)	"Love, You Ain't Seen the Last of Me" (1987)

"Take the Long Way Home" is a song written by Doug Crider and Johnny Neel, and recorded by actor and American country music artist John Schneider. It was released in December 1986 as the second single and title track from the album Take the Long Way Home. The song reached number 10 on the Billboard Hot Country Singles & Tracks chart.

== Chart performance ==
Chart (1986–1987)	Peak position
US Hot Country Songs (Billboard)	10
Canadian RPM Country Tracks	7
