= Leave Them Boys Alone =

Single by Hank Williams Jr. with Waylon Jennings and Ernest Tubb

from the album Strong Stuff
- B-side: "The Girl on the Front Row at Fort Worth"
- Released: May 1983
- Recorded: August 5, 1982
- Studio: Sound Stage Studio, Nashville, Tennessee
- Genre: Country
- Length: 3:36
- Label: Elektra/Curb
- Songwriter(s): Dean Dillon; Gary Stewart; Tanya Tucker; Hank Williams Jr.
- Producer(s): Jimmy Bowen; Hank Williams Jr.

Hank Williams Jr. singles chronology
"Gonna Go Huntin' Tonight" (1983)	"Leave Them Boys Alone" (1983)	"Queen of My Heart" (1983)

Waylon Jennings singles chronology
"Lucille (You Won't Do Your Daddy's Will)" (1983)	"Leave Them Boys Alone" (1983)	"Breakin' Down" (1983)

Ernest Tubb singles chronology
"Walking the Floor Over You" (1979)	"Leave Them Boys Alone" (1983)

"Leave Them Boys Alone" is a song recorded by American singer-songwriter and musician Hank Williams Jr. with Waylon Jennings and Ernest Tubb. It was released in May 1983 as the second single from Williams' album Strong Stuff. The song reached number six on the Billboard Hot Country Singles chart. It was written by Williams, Dean Dillon, Gary Stewart, and Tanya Tucker.

== Content ==
The lyrics of the song, much like Williams' "Family Tradition" echo the sentiment that the outlaw singers and their current escapades were antedated by the hard-living honky-tonkers of the 1950s, such as Hank Williams, Sr., and Ernest Tubb, prior to the music being fairly taken over by the Nashville Sound in the 1960s.

== Critical reception ==
Reviewing Strong Stuff for Record magazine, Lee Ballinger dismissed "Leave Them Boys Alone" as the album's "obligatory song about other Southern musicians".

== Chart performance ==
Chart (1983)	Peak position
US Hot Country Songs (Billboard)	6
Canadian RPM Country Tracks	7
