= I've Been Around Enough to Know =

Single by John Schneider

from the album Too Good to Stop Now
- B-side: "Trouble"
- Released: July 1984
- Recorded: 1984
- Genre: Country
- Length: 2:37
- Label: MCA
- Songwriter(s): Dickey Lee and Bob McDill
- Producer(s): Jimmy Bowen

John Schneider singles chronology
"If You Believe" (1984)	"I've Been Around Enough to Know" (1984)	"Country Girls" (1985)

"I've Been Around Enough to Know" is a song written by Bob McDill and Dickey Lee. It was first recorded in 1975 by Jo-El Sonnier for Mercury Records. Sonnier's version, his debut single, peaked at number 78 on the Hot Country Songs charts. Sonnier's version was produced by Glenn Keener. In 1978, Conway Twitty released Conway which included "I've Been Around Enough to Know". It was later recorded by American country music artist and The Dukes of Hazzard cast member John Schneider. It was released in July 1984 as the first single from the album Too Good to Stop Now. The song was Schneider's fourth country hit and the first of four number ones on the country chart.

== Chart performance ==
=== Jo-El Sonnier ===
Chart (1975)	Peak position
US Hot Country Songs (Billboard)	78

=== John Schneider ===
Chart (1984)	Peak position
US Hot Country Songs (Billboard)	1
Canadian RPM Country Tracks	1

=== Year-end charts ===
Chart (1984)	Position
US Hot Country Songs (Billboard)	25
