= Queen of My Heart (Hank Williams Jr. song) =

Single by Hank Williams Jr.

from the album Man of Steel
- B-side: "She Had Me"
- Released: November 1983
- Genre: Country
- Length: 3:45
- Label: Warner Bros./Curb
- Songwriter(s): Hank Williams Jr.
- Producer(s): Jimmy Bowen, Hank Williams Jr.

Hank Williams Jr. singles chronology
"Leave Them Boys Alone" (1983)	"Queen of My Heart" (1983)	"The Conversation" (1983)

"Queen of My Heart" is a song written and recorded by American singer-songwriter and musician Hank Williams Jr. It was released in November 1983 as the first single from the album Man of Steel. The song reached number 5 on the Billboard Hot Country Singles & Tracks chart.

== Chart performance ==
Chart (1983–1984)	Peak position
US Hot Country Songs (Billboard)	5
Canadian RPM Country Tracks	6
