= I'm Gonna Leave You Tomorrow =

Single by John Schneider

from the album Tryin' to Outrun the Wind
- B-side: "I Don't Feel Much Like a Cowboy Tonight"
- Released: August 10, 1985
- Genre: Country
- Length: 3:47
- Label: MCA
- Songwriter(s): Gene Dobbins, Tim Daniels, Johnny Wilson
- Producer(s): Jimmy Bowen, John Schneider

John Schneider singles chronology
| "It's a Short Walk from Heaven to Hell" (1985) | "I'm Gonna Leave You Tomorrow" (1985) | "What's a Memory Like You (Doing in a Love Like This)" (1986) |

"I'm Gonna Leave You Tomorrow" is a song written by Gene Dobbins, Tim Daniels and Johnny Wilson, and recorded by actor and American country music artist John Schneider. It was released in August 1985 as the second single from the album Tryin' to Outrun the Wind. The song reached number 10 on the Billboard Hot Country Singles & Tracks chart.

== Chart performance ==
| Chart (1985) | Peak position |
|---|---|
| US Hot Country Songs (Billboard) | 10 |
| Canadian RPM Country Tracks | 7 |
