= A Memory Like You =

Studio album by John Schneider
- Released: December 1, 1985
- Recorded: Sound Stage Studios, Nashville, Tennessee
- Genre: Country
- Label: MCA
- Producer: Jimmy Bowen, John Schneider

John Schneider chronology
Tryin' to Outrun the Wind (1985)	A Memory Like You (1985)	Take the Long Way Home (1986)

Singles from A Memory Like You
- 1. "What's a Memory Like You (Doing in a Love Like This)" Released: December 1985; 2. "You're the Last Thing I Needed Tonight" Released: April 1986

Professional ratings
Review scores
Source	Rating
Allmusic	4/5 stars

A Memory Like You is the seventh studio album by American actor and country music artist John Schneider. It was released December 1985 via MCA Records. The album peaked at number 1 on the Billboard Top Country Albums chart.

== Track listing ==
No.	Title	Writer(s)	Length
1.	"What's a Memory Like You (Doing in a Love Like This)"	Charles Quillen, John Jarrard	3:21
2.	"You're the Last Thing I Needed Tonight"	David Wills, Don Pfrimmer	3:19
3.	"Who Cares"	Don Schlitz, Kye Fleming	3:11
4.	"Somebody's Gonna Love Her"	Bob McDill, Dickey Lee	3:14
5.	"Old Rainbow Jukebox and You"	Sonny Curtis	3:23
6.	"If We Can't Have Forever"	Bob McDill, Tommy Rocco	3:27
7.	"One More Night"	Jay Lacy	2:52
8.	"He Finally Made Up Her Mind"	Carl Chambers, Herb McCullough	3:20
9.	"One Who Got Away"	Charlie Black, Rory Bourke, Steve Bogard	3:20
10.	"Welcome Home"	J.I. Allison, Sonny Curtis	3:33

== Personnel ==
- Matt Betton – drums
- Larry Byrom – electric guitar
- John Catchings – cello
- Ralph Childs – tuba
- Sonny Curtis – acoustic guitar on "Old Rainbow Jukebox and You"
- Thom Flora – background vocals
- Emory Gordy, Jr. – bass guitar
- Barry Green – trombone
- John Barlow Jarvis – keyboards
- Sam Levine – clarinet
- Michael Lunn – background vocals
- Terry Mead – trumpet
- Farrell Morris – percussion
- John Schneider – lead vocals, background vocals
- Lisa Silver – violin
- Billy Joe Walker, Jr. – acoustic guitar
- Curtis Young - background vocals
- Reggie Young – electric guitar

== Charts ==
=== Weekly charts ===
Chart (1985–1986)	Peak position
US Top Country Albums (Billboard)	1

=== Year-end charts ===
Chart (1986)	Position
US Top Country Albums (Billboard)	23
