= The Conversation (Waylon Jennings and Hank Williams Jr. song) =

Single by Waylon Jennings with Hank Williams Jr.

from the album Waylon and Company
- B-side: "Fancy Free"
- Released: October 22, 1983
- Length: 3:51
- Label: RCA Nashville
- Songwriters: Hank Williams Jr., Waylon Jennings, Richie Albright
- Producer: Waylon Jennings

Waylon Jennings singles chronology
"Take It to the Limit" (1983)	"The Conversation" (1983)	"I May Be Used (But Baby I Ain't Used Up)" (1984)

Hank Williams Jr. singles chronology
"Queen of My Heart" (1983)	"The Conversation" (1983)	"Man of Steel" (1984)

"The Conversation" is a song recorded by American singer-songwriters and musicians Waylon Jennings and Hank Williams Jr. Written by the pair along with Waylors member Ritchie Albright, the song was first included on Williams Jr.'s 1979 album Whiskey Bent and Hell Bound. The track was later reissued on Jennings' 1983 album Waylon and Company, which consisted almost entirely of duets, and was released as the album's second radio single. A music video was made to promote the single, a rarity for country music at the time. It was the first for Jennings and the second for Williams, with his first being "Queen of My Heart". The song was a moderately successful hit and reached number 15 on the Billboard Hot Country Singles chart.

== Content ==
The song recounts a conversation in which Jennings inquires about Williams's parents, Hank Williams Sr. and Audrey Williams.

== Cover versions ==
Singers Shooter Jennings and Holly Williams covered the song from the television special CMT Giants: Hank Williams Jr.

== Legacy ==
The song is featured in 2026's Grand Theft Auto VI on their Back Country Radio station in game.

== Chart performance ==
Chart (1983)	Peak position
US Hot Country Songs (Billboard)	15
Canadian RPM Country Tracks	12
