= All My Rowdy Friends (Have Settled Down) =

Single by Hank Williams Jr.

from the album The Pressure Is On
- B-side: "Everytime I Hear That Song"
- Released: September 5, 1981
- Genre: Country
- Length: 3:57
- Label: Elektra/Curb
- Songwriter: Hank Williams Jr.
- Producer: Jimmy Bowen

Hank Williams Jr. singles chronology
| "Dixie on My Mind" (1981) | "All My Rowdy Friends (Have Settled Down)" (1981) | "A Country Boy Can Survive" (1982) |

"All My Rowdy Friends (Have Settled Down)" is a song written and recorded by American country music artist Hank Williams Jr. It was released in September 1981 as the first single from the album The Pressure Is On. The song was Williams Jr.'s fifth number one on the country chart. The single stayed at number one for one week and spent a total of ten weeks on the country chart.

The phrase "all my rowdy friends" would later become a catch phrase of sorts for Williams, who would use the line in 1984 for "All My Rowdy Friends Are Coming Over Tonight," in 1987 for "Born to Boogie" and "All My Rowdy Friends Are Here on Monday Night," and in 2011 for "Keep the Change."

== Content ==
The song itself is narrated from the point of view of a singer who says his friends are now living more sedate lifestyles, and who admits his hard-living ways are taking more of a toll compared to during his younger years, but still wants to "find a friend just to run around".

There are references to Williams' contemporaries in the outlaw movement, such as George Jones (whom Williams is glad is recovering from his addictions), Waylon Jennings (spending more time with his wife Jessi Colter), Johnny Cash (not living like he did in 1968) and Kris Kristofferson (who moved to Hollywood to become an actor). Williams compares the situation to the song "Lost Highway" recorded by his father Hank Sr.

== Cover versions ==
Country music singer Gretchen Wilson covered the song from the television special CMT Giants: Hank Williams Jr.

== Charts ==
| Chart (1981) | Peak position |
|---|---|
| US Hot Country Songs (Billboard) | 1 |
| Canadian RPM Country Tracks | 1 |

== Certifications ==
| Region | Certification | Certified units/sales |
|---|---|---|
| United States (RIAA) | Platinum | 1,000,000^{‡} |
^{‡} Sales+streaming figures based on certification alone.
