= It's a Short Walk from Heaven to Hell =

Single by John Schneider

from the album Tryin' to Outrun the Wind
- B-side: "Honeymoon Wine"
- Released: April 20, 1985
- Genre: Country
- Length: 3:23
- Label: MCA
- Songwriter(s): Ken Bell, Terry Skinner, J. L. Wallace
- Producer(s): Jimmy Bowen, John Schneider

John Schneider singles chronology
"Country Girls" (1984)	"It's a Short Walk from Heaven to Hell" (1985)	"I'm Gonna Leave You Tomorrow" (1985)

"It's a Short Walk from Heaven to Hell" is a song written by Ken Bell, Terry Skinner and J. L. Wallace, and recorded by actor and American country music artist John Schneider. It was released in April 1985 as the first single from the album Tryin' to Outrun the Wind. The song reached number 10 on the Billboard Hot Country Singles & Tracks chart.

== Chart performance ==
Chart (1985)	Peak position
US Hot Country Songs (Billboard)	10
Canadian RPM Country Tracks	6
