= Major Moves (song) =

Single by Hank Williams Jr.

from the album Major Moves
- B-side: "Mr. Lincoln"
- Released: January 19, 1985
- Genre: Country
- Length: 3:34
- Label: Warner Bros./Curb
- Songwriter(s): Hank Williams Jr.
- Producer(s): Jimmy Bowen, Hank Williams Jr.

Hank Williams Jr. singles chronology
"All My Rowdy Friends Are Coming Over Tonight" (1984)	"Major Moves" (1985)	"I'm for Love" (1985)

"Major Moves" is a song written and recorded by American singer-songwriter and musician Hank Williams Jr. It was released in January 1985 as the third single and title track from the album Major Moves. The song reached #10 on the Billboard Hot Country Singles & Tracks chart.

== Chart performance ==
Chart (1985)	Peak position
US Hot Country Songs (Billboard)	10
Canadian RPM Country Tracks	14
