= John Schneider (screen actor) =

American actor and singer (born 1960)

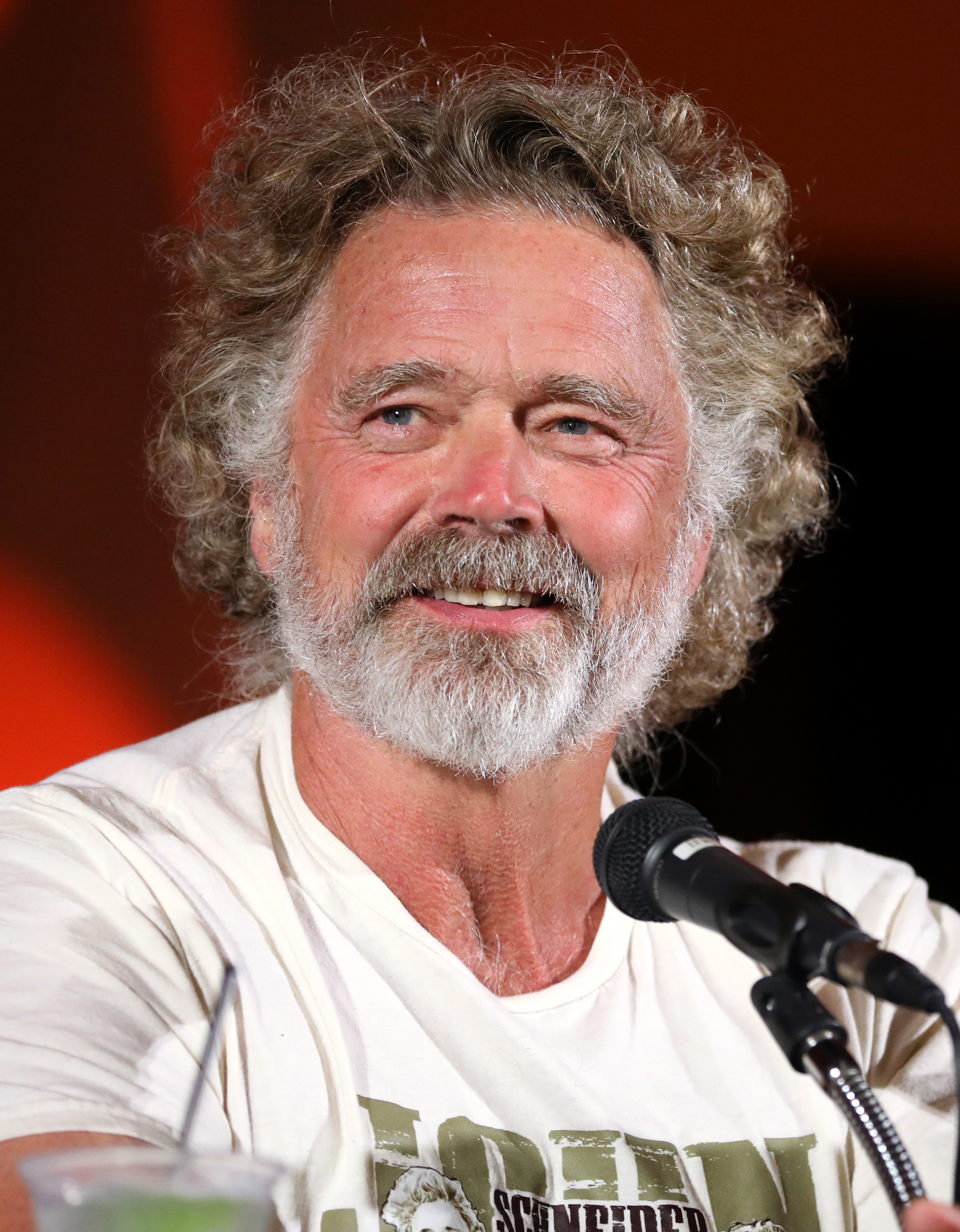
- Schneider in 2024
- Born: John Richard Schneider; April 8, 1960 (age 66); Mount Kisco, New York, U.S.
- Occupations: Actor; singer; screenwriter; producer; director
- Years active: 1977–present
- Known for: Beauregard "Bo" Duke in The Dukes of Hazzard
- Spouses: Tawny Little (m. 1983; div. 1986); Elly Castle (m. 1993; div. 2019); Alicia Allain (m. 2019; died 2023); Dee Dee Sorvino (m. 2024)
- Children: 3
- Musical career
- Genre: Country
- Instruments: Vocals, guitar
- Years active: 1981–present
- Labels: Scotti Brothers, MCA Nashville, FaithWorks, Johnnelly, 13 Distribution, Maven Entertainment

John Richard Schneider (born April 8, 1960) is an American actor and country music singer. He is best known for his portrayal of Bo Duke in the television action comedy series The Dukes of Hazzard (1979–1985), as Clark Kent's adoptive father Jonathan Kent in the television series Smallville (2001–2011), and Jim Cryer in the television series The Haves and the Have Nots (2013–2021).

Alongside his acting career, Schneider has been a country singer since the early 1980s, releasing nine studio albums, a greatest hits package, and eighteen singles. This total includes "I've Been Around Enough to Know", "Country Girls", "What's a Memory Like You", and "You're the Last Thing I Needed Tonight", all of which reached the top of the Billboard country singles charts.

== Early life ==
John Richard Schneider was born on April 8, 1960, in Mount Kisco, New York, the youngest of three boys of Shirley (Frasier; 1932–2016) Conklin and John "Jack" Schneider (1930–2013), a pilot who had served in the U.S. Air Force. His mother was from Sanford, Florida. His family included an older brother Robert, who became an artist living in southern New York. His other brother, who was also named John, died of lung failure when he was three years old, which was three years before John's birth. John's life as an entertainer began at the age of eight, when he put on magic shows for his peers and their families. This once got him into trouble, when he had himself chained up and tossed into a swimming pool with the intention of re-creating Harry Houdini's legendary escape act. When he was 14, he and his mother moved to Atlanta, Georgia, where his love for performing continued. He went to North Springs High School in Sandy Springs, Georgia.

== Career ==
=== Acting ===
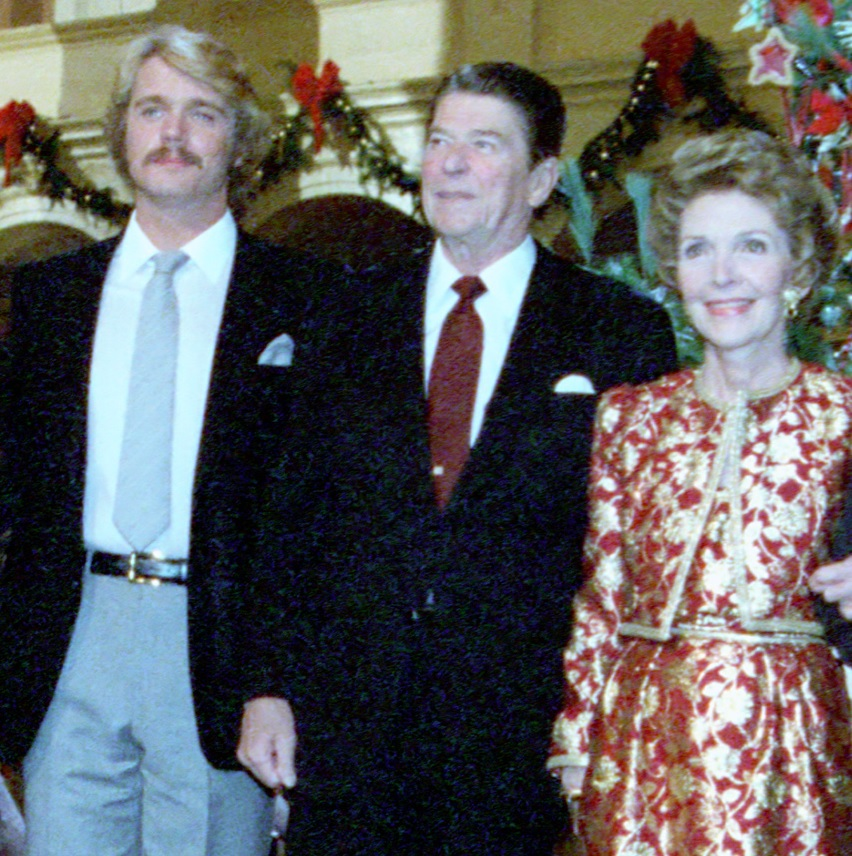
Schneider with President Ronald Reagan and First Lady Nancy Reagan during a taping of NBC's Christmas in Washington special in 1982

At the age of 18, he won the role of Bo Duke, working alongside another newcomer Tom Wopat and veteran actor James Best. For his audition, he "borrowed a dilapidated pickup truck, put on a big ol' country accent and funky hat. I hadn't shaved and went in toting a beer. I don't know whether they believed it or not, but they liked it." Schneider learned to drive the iconic Dodge Charger in the show, but to the disappointment of many fans, he admitted he never jumped the car due to the dangerous nature of the stunt.

At the height of the series' popularity, he also became a recording artist and a face of merchandise. In 1982, a tangle of legal suits with the producers over the distribution of merchandising royalties caused Schneider and co-star Tom Wopat to leave the show for most of a season. They returned to their roles in February 1983 only after their claims were satisfied. The show was canceled in 1985, after seven seasons. Schneider directed the series finale, titled "Opening Night at the Boar's Nest," airing originally on CBS, February 8, 1985.

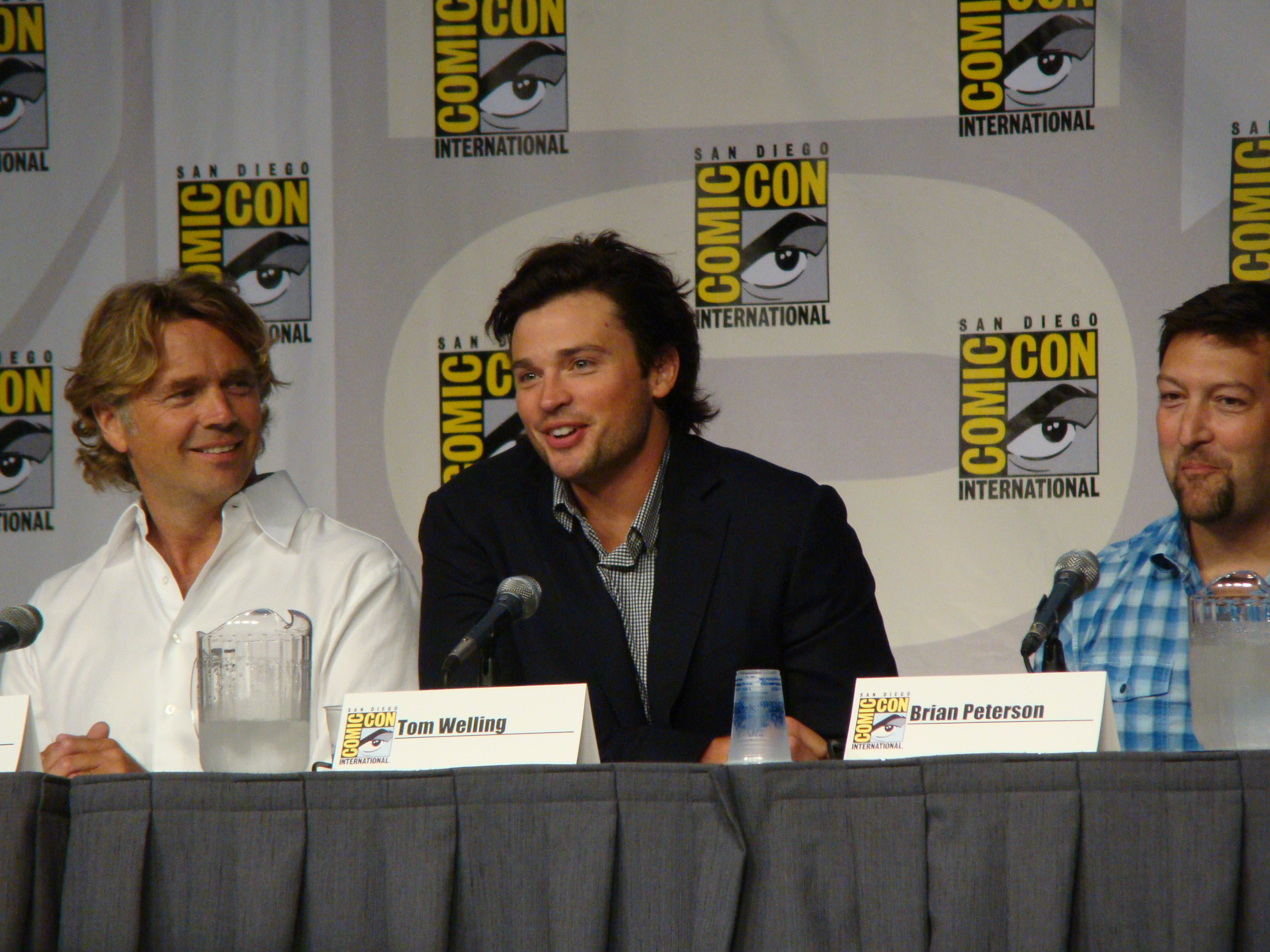
Schneider (left) with Smallville co-star Tom Welling and producer Brian Peterson

In 2001, he portrayed Jonathan Kent, the adoptive father of Clark Kent in 100 episodes of Smallville. Schneider directed some episodes of Smallville, including "Talisman". Some episodes contain references to Schneider's work in The Dukes of Hazzard, e.g. the season five episode "Exposed" is notable for reuniting Schneider with his former Dukes co-star Tom Wopat. Schneider guest starred for the latter half of season five appearing in the episodes "Void" and "Oracle". Schneider returned for the season 10 premiere of Smallville, reprising his role as Jonathan Kent in a recurring role.

Schneider has appeared in many films and television series, including five guest spots on Hee Haw and the miniseries 10.5. He had a recurring role on Dr. Quinn, Medicine Woman, and made guest appearances on such shows as Diagnosis: Murder, Touched by an Angel, JAG and Walker, Texas Ranger.

In 2009, Schneider made an appearance on CSI in an episode titled "Kill Me If You Can". He appeared in the first season of The Secret Life of the American Teenager. in which his real-life son Chasen Schneider had a recurring role. During the summer of 2008 and early 2009, John portrayed "Marshall Bowman". He declined to continue through the second season and his character was written off.

In 2010, Schneider appeared in the series Leverage (2010) as a corrupt music executive in the season three episode "The Studio Job". He played the role of a retired military man and father of Keith Watson (Brian Austin Green), the love interest of Bree Van de Kamp in several episodes of Desperate Housewives (2010). In 2011, he starred in the film Doonby, as a drifter who comes into a small town and makes it better. However, a menacing force stalks him. "It's It's a Wonderful Life without the wonderful part," Schneider explains. "'Reach down into the throat of It's a Wonderful Life, pull it inside out and make a movie out of it."

In 2014, he returned to the role of Bo Duke, alongside Tom Wopat as Luke Duke, in a commercial for Autotrader.com.

=== Filmmaking ===
In addition to acting, John Schneider owns and operates the John Schneider Studios (JSS) where he writes and produces independent films in Holden, Louisiana. JSS has created an infrastructure to give independent filmmakers all the tools they need to create their stories and films in one location.

=== Music ===
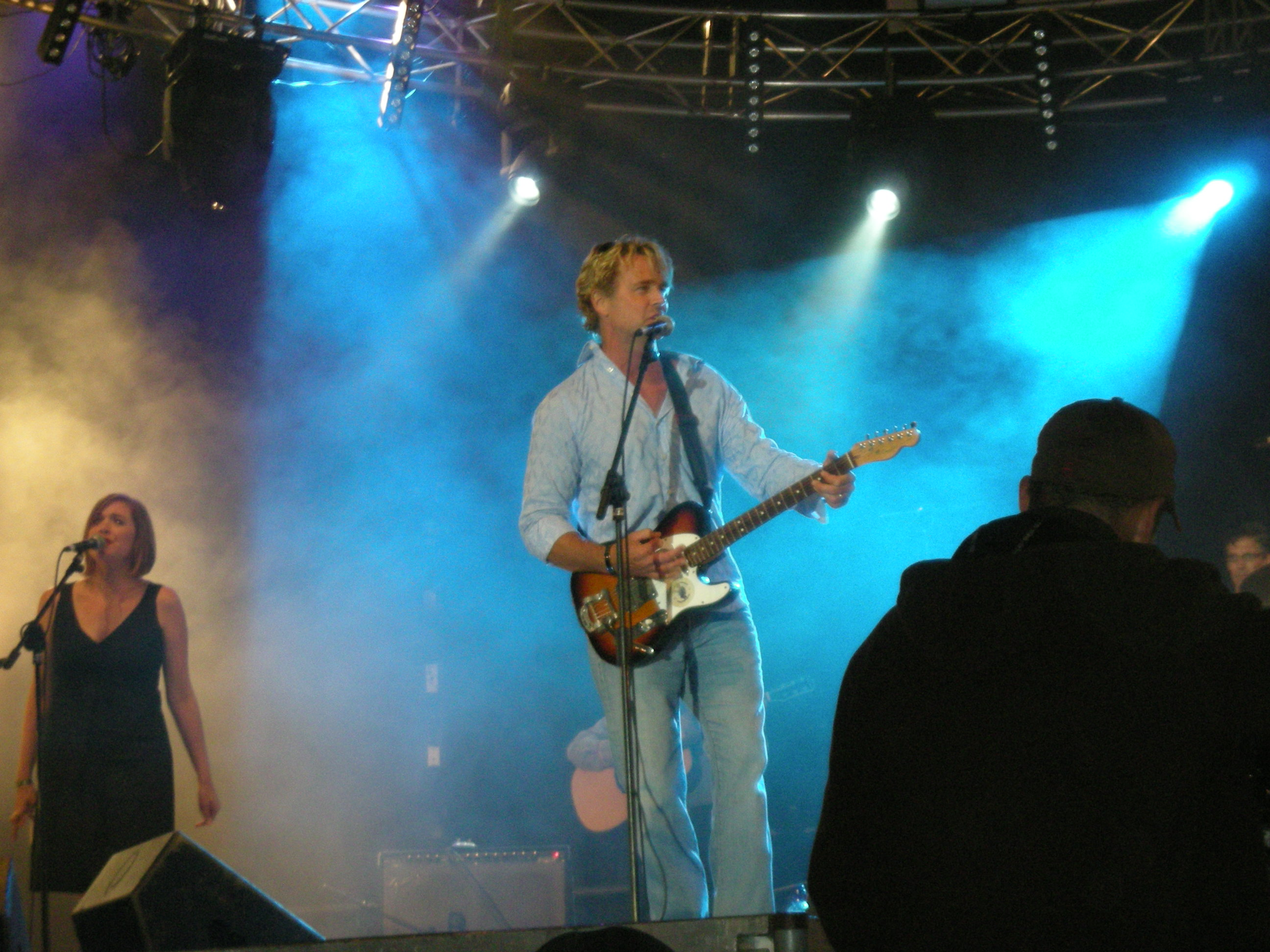
Schneider performing in 2008

During Schneider's Dukes of Hazzard days, he also entered into music. In the early 80s Schneider signed with Scotti Brothers Label and released his debut full-length album, Now or Never, which peaked at No. 8 on the US Country Billboard charts. The single "It's Now or Never," a remake of the Elvis Presley hit, peaked at number 4 on the US Country Billboard charts and peaked at number 14 on the Billboard Hot 100 chart in 1981 and is one of the highest charting Elvis covers of all time.

Schneider continued to release albums, including Quiet Man and If You Believe, and, in 1984, signed with MCA Nashville. Through MCA Nashville, Schneider released Too Good to Stop Now which included his first No. 1 hits, "I've Been Around Enough to Know" and "Country Girls," peaking at No. 1 on the CAN Country music charts. In 1985, Schneider unleashed Tryin' To Outrun the Wind, followed by A Memory Like You which debuted at No. 1 on the US Country Billboard charts, a first for Schneider.

The album A Memory Like You featured "What's a Memory Like You (Doing In A Love Like This)" and "You're The Last Thing I Needed Tonight", singles which both peaked at No. 1 on the US Country Billboard charts and CAN Country. In the late '80s, Schneider continued releasing albums including his Greatest Hits record. Taking some time off to pursue acting opportunities, Schneider returned with Worth The Wait, John's Acoustic Christmas, The Promise and Home For Christmas, with The Dukes of Hazzard co-star Tom Wopat in 2014.

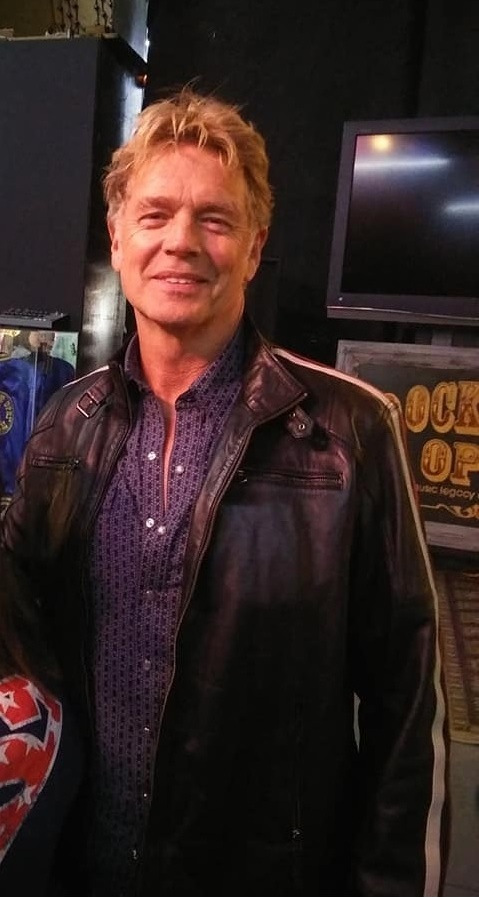
Schneider at a meet and greet in 2019

In 2019, on January 29, LIVE, at a filming of the television show "Good Rockin' Tonight," John Schneider was Inducted on the air into The Louisiana Music Hall Of Fame in Baton Rouge, Louisiana. "I hadn't done music since 1990. People responded to that music, and one thing led to another," shares Schneider. "It's funny. Even though I had a bunch of No. 1 songs, people say, 'Oh, I love that Dukes of Hazzard song you sang!' Well, I didn't sing it, Waylon Jennings sang it. I'm famous for music by a song I never sang. Crazy."

In 2023, Schneider competed in season ten of The Masked Singer as "Donut". He finished in 2nd place where he also referenced the death of his wife Alicia Allain.

=== Theater ===
Schneider has also been involved with a number of stage performances: 42nd Street [Pittsburgh, PA (Regional)] Pittsburgh CLO Revival, 2006 Julian Marsh [Replacement] Chicago [Broadway] Broadway Revival, 1996 Billy Flynn [Replacement] Grand Hotel [Broadway] Original Broadway Production, 1989 Felix Von Gaigern [Replacement] (source: Broadway World) Sound of Music [Hollywood Bowl, CA] Starring Melissa Errico, John Schneider with Ben Platt, Marni Nixon Broadway Revival, 2006

=== Audio books ===
Schneider took part In the "Word of Promise" Audio Bible series, which featured the voices of many famous actors and actresses. He voiced James in the Book of James.

=== Dancing with the Stars ===
On September 12, 2018, Schneider was announced as one of the celebrities who would compete on season 27 of Dancing with the Stars. His professional partner was Emma Slater. They became the sixth couple to be eliminated from the competition on November 5, alongside DeMarcus Ware and his professional partner Lindsay Arnold.

== Personal life ==
In 1982, Schneider co-founded the Children's Miracle Network with Marie Osmond and her brothers. In 1995, he founded FaithWorks Productions in order to produce family-oriented videos and recordings. In 1998, Schneider became a born-again Christian while living with Johnny and June Carter Cash for a short time, and speaking with Johnny about Christianity.

Schneider was good friends with James Best, who played Sheriff Rosco P. Coltrane in The Dukes of Hazzard, until Best's death, April 6, 2015, at age 88.

In a February 2024 interview with One America News Network, a far-right television network, Schneider likened Beyoncé's entry into country music to a "dog peeing on a tree."

=== Relationships ===
Schneider was married to former Miss America Tawny Elaine Godin from 1983 to 1986. He married his second wife, Elvira "Elly" Castle, on July 11, 1993. On December 12, 2014, TMZ.com reported that Castle had filed for divorce. It was finalized in 2019. They have three children: two are Castle's children from her first marriage (born in 1991) and a daughter together. He married Alicia Allain in September 2019; they remained together until Allain's death from breast cancer on February 21, 2023.

On July 23, 2024, Schneider married Dee Dee Sorvino, actor Paul Sorvino's widow. Both stars had lost their spouses in the previous two years leading up to their marriage.

=== Legal issues ===
On June 12, 2018, Schneider spoke to Fox News regarding his upcoming three-day jail sentence for failing to pay alimony to his estranged wife Elvira Castle. He said he has had hard financial times and he has spent his money on repairing his studio in Louisiana which was destroyed in an August 2016 flood. He was arrested at 10:29 AM and released at 3:45 PM. The short imprisonment was due to the overcrowded prison. He contrasted the warm treatment of the corrections officers to the "guilty until proven innocent" treatment he received in the court system. However, he was still ordered to perform 240 hours of community service and pay the debt to Elvira, or else face imprisonment of five years.

On December 21, 2023, Schneider posted a comment on X calling for the prosecution and public hanging of U.S. President Joe Biden and his son Hunter Biden for treason, including the quote "Mr. President, I believe you are guilty of treason and should be publicly hung. Your son too". The comment was deleted after it drew criticism and the attention of the United States Secret Service, who opened an investigation into the remark. Schneider has publicly denied advocating violence.

== Filmography ==
=== Film ===
| Year | Title | Role | Note |
|---|---|---|---|
| 1977 | Smokey and the Bandit | Cowboy Extra in Crowd Scene | |
| 1981 | Dream House | Charley Cross | Television movie |
| 1983 | Happy Endings | Nick Callohan | Television movie |
| 1983 | Eddie Macon's Run | Eddie Macon | |
| 1983 | The Raccoons and the Lost Star | Dan the Forest Ranger (voice) | Television movie |
| 1985 | Gus Brown and Midnight Brewster | Gus Brown | Television movie |
| 1985 | Cocaine Wars | DEA Agent Cliff Adams | |
| 1986 | Stagecoach | Buck | Television movie |
| 1987 | The Curse | Carl Willis | |
| 1987 | Christmas Comes to Willow Creek | Ray | Television movie |
| 1988 | Outback Bound | Jim Tully | Television movie |
| 1989 | Speed Zone | Donato | |
| 1989 | Ministry of Vengeance | David Miller | |
| 1992 | Highway Heartbreaker | Mickey Kenton | Television movie |
| 1993 | Desperate Journey: The Allison Wilcox Story | Eddie | Television movie |
| 1993 | Come the Morning | George | |
| 1994 | Bandit Bandit | Sheriff Enright | Television movie |
| 1994 | Exit to Eden | Prof. Collins | |
| 1994 | Texas | Davy Crockett | Television movie |
| 1996 | The Legend of the Ruby Silver | Tommy Towne | Television movie |
| 1996 | Night of the Twisters | Jack Hatch | Television movie |
| 1997 | The Dukes of Hazzard: Reunion! | Bo Duke | Television movie |
| 1997 | True Women | Sam Houston | Television movie |
| 1999 | Michael Landon, the Father I Knew | Michael Landon | Television movie |
| 1999 | Sam Churchill: Search for a Homeless Man | Sam Churchill | Television movie |
| 2000 | Snow Day | Chad Symmonz | |
| 2000 | The Dukes of Hazzard: Hazzard in Hollywood | Bo Duke | Television movie |
| 2001 | Lightning: Fire from the Sky | Tom Dobbs | Television movie |
| 2002 | Mary Christmas | Joel Wallace | Television movie |
| 2003 | Kids' Ten Commandments: Stolen Jewels, Stolen Hearts | Simeon (voice) | Short |
| 2003 | The Nick at Nite Holiday Special | Mr. Schneider | Television movie |
| 2005 | Felicity: An American Girl Adventure | Edward Merriman | Television movie |
| 2006 | Hidden Secrets | Gary Zimmerman | |
| 2006 | Collier & Co. | J.R. Collier | |
| 2007 | Lake Placid 2 | Sheriff James Riley | Television movie |
| 2007 | You've Got a Friend | Jim Klecan | Television movie |
| 2007 | Sydney White | Paul White | |
| 2008 | Davie & Golimyr | Golimyr (voice) | Video |
| 2008 | Ogre | Henry Bartlett | Television movie |
| 2008 | Shark Swarm | Daniel Wilder | Television movie |
| 2008 | Conjurer | Frank Higgins | |
| 2008 | Beautiful Loser | Andre | |
| 2009 | The Gods of Circumstance | Mick Jeremiah | |
| 2009 | H2O Extreme | Crash | |
| 2009 | Come Dance at My Wedding | Tanner Gray | Television movie |
| 2009 | The Rebound | Trevor | |
| 2009 | Set Apart | Pastor John Gunn | |
| 2010 | What Would Jesus Do? | The Drifter | |
| 2010 | Holyman Undercover | Satan | |
| 2010 | Wild Things: Foursome | Detective Frank Walker | Video |
| 2010 | Lego Hero Factory: Rise of the Rookies | Preston Stormer (voice) | |
| 2010 | Back Nine | Ronnie Barnes | Television movie |
| 2011 | A Valentine's Date | Pastor Frank | Television movie |
| 2011 | Snow Beast | Jim Harwood | |
| 2011 | October Baby | Jacob Lawson | |
| 2011 | Lego Hero Factory: Savage Planet | Preston Stormer (voice) | |
| 2011 | Flag of My Father | Daniel | |
| 2011 | Super Shark | Roger Wade | |
| 2012 | Whiskey Business | Sheriff Gilly | Television movie |
| 2012 | Hardflip | Jack Sanders | |
| 2012 | I Am... Gabriel | Doc | Video |
| 2012 | Return of the Killer Shrews | Johnny Reno | |
| 2012 | Lukewarm | Bill Rogers | |
| 2012 | My Guy Cary Grant | Jake | Short |
| 2013 | Not Today | Luke | |
| 2013 | Season of Miracles | Coach Wayne Hornbuckle | |
| 2013 | Doonby | Sam Doonby | |
| 2014 | Road to the Open | Rob Gollant | |
| 2014 | A Tiger's Tail | Narrator (voice) | |
| 2014 | Let the Lion Roar | Hilary Bishop of Poitiers | |
| 2014 | 10,000 Days | William Beck | |
| 2015 | Love by the Book | Frank Donovan | Television movie |
| 2015 | Runaway Hearts | Chief Tate | |
| 2015 | American Justice | Sheriff Payden | |
| 2015 | WWJD What Would Jesus Do? The Journey Continues | The Drifter | |
| 2015 | A Gift Horse | Mr. Canton | |
| 2015 | Adrenaline | Paul Sharpe | |
| 2016 | My Father Die | Detective Johnson | |
| 2016 | Smothered | Player | |
| 2016 | Exit 14 | Father | |
| 2016 | Sandra Brown's White Hot | Huff Hoyle | |
| 2016 | Inadmissible | Bryce Danos | |
| 2016 | Anderson Beach | Dispatcher | |
| 2016 | Like Son | Will Weston, DA | |
| 2017 | You're Gonna Miss Me | Colt Montana | |
| 2017 | Because of Grácia | Principal Schaub | |
| 2017 | Demons | Dr. Gerry Connor | |
| 2017 | 4: Go | Game Warden | |
| 2017 | Hate Crime | John Demarco | |
| 2017 | Family of Lies | David | Television movie |
| 2018 | Alien Intrusion | Narrator | |
| 2018 | Christmas Star | Greg Palmer | Television movie |
| 2018 | The Dragon Unleashed | The Colonel | |
| 2019 | The Favorite | Daniel Bernard | |
| 2019 | Christmas Cars | Uncle Denver | |
| 2020 | Roe v. Wade | Byron White | |
| 2020 | Emerald Run | Martin Dwyer | |
| 2020 | Riding Faith | Mike | |
| 2020 | Penance Lane | Father John | |
| 2020 | Roped | Shawn | |
| 2020 | Tulsa | Dr. Holden | |
| 2020 | Switched | Ken Sharp | |
| 2020 | Stand on It | Duke Marietta | |
| 2020 | A Royal Christmas Engagement | John Holiday | Television movie |
| 2021 | The Stairs | Grandpa Gene Martin | |
| 2021 | Love Is on the Air | Garrett | |
| 2021 | Christmas in Tune | Joe Winter | Television movie |
| 2021 | Poker Run | Duke Marietta | |
| 2022 | Adeline | Sheriff | |
| 2022 | Tres Leches | Police Emergency Guy | |
| 2022 | Mysterious Circumstance: The Death of Meriwether Lewis | James Neely | |
| 2022 | To Die For | Quint North | Video |
| 2022 | Cadillac Respect | Commissioner Lamont | Short |
| 2023 | The Confession Musical | Dylan Bennet | Television movie |
| 2023 | Jingle Smells | James Neeley | Video |
| 2024 | The Good Fight | Michael Crawford | |
| 2024 | Finding Faith | | |

=== Television ===
| Year(s) | Title | Role | Note |
|---|---|---|---|
| 1979–1985 | The Dukes of Hazzard | Bo Duke | Main cast: Season 1–4 & 6–7, Recurring Cast: Season 5 |
| 1981 | The Midnight Special | Himself/Host | Episode: "Episode #9.23" |
| 1982 | Madame's Place | Himself | Episode: "It's the Ghosts!" |
| 1983 | The Dukes | Bo Duke (voice) | Main cast: Season 2 |
| 1983 | The Raccoons and the Lost Star | Dan the Forest Ranger (voice) | |
| 1989 | Wild Jack | Jack McCall | Episode: "Part 1–3" |
| 1989 | Guns of Paradise | Sheriff Pat Garrett | Episode: "A Gathering of Guns" |
| 1990 | Grand Slam | Dennis "Hardball" Bakelenekoff | Main cast |
| 1992 | Loving | Larry Lamont | Regular cast |
| 1992 | Delta | Jimmy Word | Episode: "The Bad Word" |
| 1993 | Sisters | McGreevy/McGrady/McGruder | Episode: "Moving Pictures" |
| 1994 | Second Chances | Richard McGill | Recurring cast |
| 1994 | Burke's Law | Brett Scanlon | Episode: "Who Killed the Soap Star?" |
| 1994 | Christy | Theodore Harland | Episode: "Amazing Grace" |
| 1994 | Heaven Help Us | Doug Monroe | Main cast |
| 1995 | Touched by an Angel | Frank Littleton | Episode: "In the Name of God" |
| 1996 | Kung Fu: The Legend Continues | Latrodect | Episode: "Black Widow" |
| 1996 | Diagnosis: Murder | Michael Dern | Episode: "X Marks the Murder Part 1 & 2" |
| 1997–1998 | Dr. Quinn, Medicine Woman | Daniel Simon | Guest: Season 5, Recurring cast: Season 6 |
| 1998 | JAG | Sgt. Clyde Morrison | Episode: "Mr. Rabb Goes to Washington" |
| 1999 | Walker, Texas Ranger | Jacob Crossland | Episode: "Jacob's Ladder" |
| 1999–2000 | Veronica's Closet | Tom | Recurring cast: Season 3 |
| 2000 | Relic Hunter | Dallas Carter | Episode: "The Emperor’s Bride" |
| 2000 | Diagnosis: Murder | Brett Hayward/Eddie Dagabosian | Recurring cast: Season 7 |
| 2001 | Twice in a Lifetime | Captain Luke Sellars/Willie | Episode: "Final Flight" |
| 2001 | Touched by an Angel | Joshua Winslow | Episode: "Shallow Water: Part 1 & 2" |
| 2001–2003 | The Mummy | Rick O'Connell (voice) | Main cast |
| 2001–2006, 2010–2011 | Smallville | Jonathan Kent | Main cast: Seasons 1–5, Recurring Cast: Season 10 |
| 2004 | 10.5 | Clark Williams | Episode: "Part 1 & 2" |
| 2005 | Living with Fran | Tom Martin | Episode: "Riley's Parents" |
| 2006 | King of the Hill | The Ace (voice) | Episode: "You Gotta Believe (In Moderation)" |
| 2006 | Rodney | Himself | Episode: "Celebrity" |
| 2006 | Shorty McShorts' Shorts | Hunky-D (voice) | Episode: "The Phabulizers" |
| 2006 | The Twilight Zone Radio Dramas | David Andrew Gurney (voice) | Episode: "Person or Persons Unknown" |
| 2007 | Journeyman | Dennis Armstrong | Episode: "Winterland" |
| 2007–2009 | Nip/Tuck | Ram Peters | Recurring cast: Season 5 |
| 2008 | CSI: Miami | Charles Brighton | Episode: "Tunnel Vision" |
| 2008–2009 | The Secret Life of the American Teenager | Marshall Bowman | Recurring cast: Season 1 |
| 2009 | CSI: Crime Scene Investigation | Mickey Ross | Episode: "Kill Me If You Can" |
| 2009 | Dirty Sexy Money | Congressman Skip Whatley | Recurring cast: Season 2 |
| 2009 | Curb Your Enthusiasm | Dennis | Episode: "Officer Krupke" |
| 2009–2010 | 90210 | Jeffrey Sarkossian | Recurring cast: Season 2 |
| 2010 | Leverage | Mitchell Kirkwood | Episode: "The Studio Job" |
| 2010 | Desperate Housewives | Richard Watson | Recurring cast: Season 7 |
| 2010 | Twentysixmiles | Jack Kinkaid | Main cast |
| 2010 | 10,000 Days | William Beck | Main cast |
| 2010–2011 | Phineas and Ferb | Wilkins Brother #1 (voice) | Guest cast: Season 2–3 |
| 2010–2011 | Hot in Cleveland | Henry 'Hank' Szymborska | Guest cast: Season 1–3 |
| 2010–2013 | Hero Factory | Preston Stormer (voice) | Main cast |
| 2011 | Working Class | Glen | Episode: "Sugar Mama" |
| 2011 | Glee | Dwight Evans | Episode: "Hold on to Sixteen" |
| 2011 | Dating in the Middle Ages | Jake Hagerty | Episode: "The Perfect Match?" |
| 2012 | Happily Divorced | Adam | Episode: "Adventure Man" |
| 2013 | Mistresses | Thomas Grey | Recurring cast: Season 1 |
| 2013–2021 | The Haves and the Have Nots | James "Jim" Cryer | Main cast |
| 2020 | Viral Vignettes | Stan | Episode: "Bandmates" |
| 2023 | The Masked Singer | Contestant | Performed as "Donut" in Season 10, runner-up |

=== Video games ===
| Year | Title | Role |
|---|---|---|
| 2004 | The Dukes of Hazzard: Return of the General Lee | Bo Duke (voice) |

== Discography ==
=== Albums ===
| Year | Album | Chart positions | | | Label |
| Year | Album | US Country | US | US Jazz | Label |
|---|---|---|---|---|---|
| 1981 | Now or Never | 8 | 37 | — | Scotti Brothers |
| 1981 | White Christmas | 39 | 155 | — | Scotti Brothers |
| 1982 | Quiet Man | — | — | — | Scotti Brothers |
| 1983 | If You Believe | — | — | — | Scotti Brothers |
| 1984 | Too Good to Stop Now | 4 | 111 | — | MCA |
| 1985 | Tryin' to Outrun the Wind | 15 | — | — | MCA |
| 1985 | A Memory Like You | 1 | — | — | MCA |
| 1986 | Take the Long Way Home | 17 | — | — | MCA |
| 1987 | You Ain't Seen the Last of Me | 41 | — | — | MCA |
| 1987 | Greatest Hits | 22 | — | — | MCA |
| 1996 | Worth the Wait | — | — | — | FaithWorks |
| 2003 | Hell This Ain't Heaven | — | — | — | Johnnelly |
| 2009 | John's Schneider's Favorite Hits, Vol. 1 | — | — | — | self-released |
| 2009 | John's Schneider's Favorite Hits, Vol. 2 | — | — | — | self-released |
| 2009 | John's Schneider's Favorite Hits, Vol. 3 | — | — | — | self-released |
| 2009 | Lost Schneider, Vol. 1 | — | — | — | self-released |
| 2009 | Lost Schneider, Vol. 2 | — | — | — | self-released |
| 2009 | John's Acoustic Christmas | — | — | — | self-released |
| 2014 | Home for Christmas (with Tom Wopat) | — | — | 8 | Distribution 13 |
| 2016 | Ruffled Skirts | — | — | — | Maven Music |
| 2017 | Hell This Ain't Heaven | — | — | — | Maven Music |
| 2018 | The Odyssey: The Journey | — | — | — | Maven Music |
| 2018 | The Odyssey: Vagabond | — | — | — | Maven Music |
| 2018 | The Odyssey: Awakening | — | — | — | Maven Music |
| 2018 | The Odyssey: Crossroads | — | — | — | Maven Music |
| 2018 | The Odyssey: Wanderlust | — | — | — | Maven Music |
| 2018 | The Odyssey: Beginnings | — | — | — | Maven Music |
| 2018 | Greatest Hits: Still | — | — | — | Maven Music |
| 2018 | Merry Christmas Baby | — | — | — | Maven Music |
| 2018 | John Schneider's Greatest Hits: Still! | — | — | — | |
| 2019 | Redneck Rebel | — | — | — | . https://open.spotify.com/album/68d8IRSphrflyLMKgQV2Lx |
| 2019 | Odyssey Project | — | — | — | |
| 2019 | Recycling Grace | — | — | — | |

=== Singles ===
| Year | Single | Peak positions | | | | | Album |
| Year | Single | US Country | US | US AC | CAN Country | CAN AC | Album |
|---|---|---|---|---|---|---|---|
| 1981 | "It's Now or Never" | 4 | 14 | 5 | 7 | 5 | Now or Never |
| 1981 | "Them Good Ol' Boys Are Bad" | 13 | — | — | 12 | — | Now or Never |
| 1981 | "Still" | — | 69 | 32 | — | — | Now or Never |
| 1982 | "Dreamin'" | 32 | 45 | 21 | 28 | 19 | Quiet Man |
| 1982 | "In the Driver's Seat" | 56 | 72 | — | 36 | — | Quiet Man |
| 1983 | "Are You Lonesome Tonight" (with Jill Michaels) | 57 | — | — | — | — | If You Believe |
| 1983 | "If You Believe" | 81 | — | — | — | — | If You Believe |
| 1984 | "I've Been Around Enough to Know" | 1 | — | — | 1 | — | Too Good to Stop Now |
| 1984 | "Country Girls" | 1 | — | — | 1 | — | Too Good to Stop Now |
| 1985 | "It's a Short Walk from Heaven to Hell" | 10 | — | — | 6 | — | Tryin' to Outrun the Wind |
| 1985 | "I'm Gonna Leave You Tomorrow" | 10 | — | — | 7 | — | Tryin' to Outrun the Wind |
| 1985 | "What's a Memory Like You (Doing in a Love Like This)" | 1 | — | — | 1 | — | A Memory Like You |
| 1986 | "You're the Last Thing I Needed Tonight" | 1 | — | — | 1 | — | A Memory Like You |
| 1986 | "At the Sound of the Tone" | 5 | — | — | 16 | — | Take the Long Way Home |
| 1986 | "Take the Long Way Home" | 10 | — | — | 7 | — | Take the Long Way Home |
| 1987 | "Love, You Ain't Seen the Last of Me" | 6 | — | — | 4 | — | You Ain't Seen the Last of Me |
| 1987 | "When the Right One Comes Along" | 32 | — | — | 35 | — | You Ain't Seen the Last of Me |
| 1987 | "If It Was Anyone But You" | 59 | — | — | — | — | You Ain't Seen the Last of Me |
| 2018 | "I'll Still Be Loving You" | — | — | — | — | — | The Odyssey: Vegabond |
| 2018 | "Fish" | — | — | — | — | — | The Odyssey: Beginnings |
| 2018 | "Can I Buy You a Beer" | — | — | — | — | — | The Odyssey: Wanderlust |
"—" denotes releases that did not chart

=== Promotional singles ===
| Year | Single | Album |
|---|---|---|
| 2009 | "The Promise" | Single Only |
| 2018 | "Good Ole Boys (with Various Artists)" | The Odyssey: Vegabond |
| 2018 | "Wherever She Is" | The Odyssey: Beginnings |
| 2018 | "Heaven Help Me" | The Odyssey: Awakening |
| 2018 | "Crazy Women" | The Odyssey: Wanderlust |
| 2018 | "They Lived It Up To Write It Down" | The Odyssey: Crossroads |
| 2018 | "We All Give God The Blues" | The Odyssey: The Journey |
| 2018 | "I Wouldn't Be Me Without You" | The Odyssey: The Journey |
| 2018 | "Like A River" | The Odyssey: The Journey |
| 2018 | "Two Trains" | The Odyssey: The Journey |
| 2018 | "Heartache Doesn't Have a Closing Time" | The Odyssey: The Journey |
| 2018 | "Bet Yo Mama" | The Odyssey: The Journey |
| 2018 | "Outta This Town" | The Odyssey: The Journey |
| 2018 | "Can I Buy You a Beer" | The Odyssey: The Journey |
| 2018 | "Toolbox" | The Odyssey: Crossroads |
| 2018 | "I Hate Cancer" | The Odyssey: Awakening |
| 2018 | "Phantom Of The Grand Ole Opry" | The Odyssey: Beginnings |
| 2018 | "Tumbleweeds" | The Odyssey: Awakening |
| 2018 | "Who Da Baby Daddy" | Merry Christmas Baby |
| 2018 | "A Kid From Somewhere" | The Odyssey: Awakening |
| 2018 | "Devil in the Mirror" | The Odyssey: Crossroads |

=== Music videos ===
| Year | Video |
|---|---|
| 1985 | "I'm Gonna Leave You Tomorrow" |
| 2006 | "Good Ole Boys (with Tom Wopat & Catherine Bach)" |
| 2009 | "The Promised Land" |
| 2018 | "Good Ole Boys (with Various Artists)" |
| 2018 | "Wherever She Is" |
| 2018 | "Heaven Help Me" |
| 2018 | "Crazy Women" |
| 2018 | "They Lived It Up To Write It Down" |
| 2018 | "We All Give God The Blues" |
| 2018 | "I Wouldn't Be Me Without You" |
| 2018 | "Like A River" |
| 2018 | "Two Trains" |
| 2018 | "Heartache Doesn't Have a Closing Time" |
| 2018 | "Bet Yo Mama" |
| 2018 | "Outta This Town" |
| 2018 | "Can I Buy You a Beer" |
| 2018 | "Toolbox" |
| 2018 | "I Hate Cancer" |
| 2018 | "Phantom Of The Grand Ole Opry" |
| 2018 | "Tumbleweeds" |
| 2018 | "Who Da Baby Daddy" |
| 2018 | "A Kid From Somewhere" |
| 2018 | "Devil in the Mirror" |
| 2018 | "Walk a Mile in My Shoes" |
| 2019 | "Livin' My Life My Way" |
