= Attitude Adjustment (song) =

Single by Hank Williams Jr.

from the album Major Moves
- B-side: "Knoxville Courthouse Blues"
- Released: June 11, 1984
- Genre: Country
- Length: 2:55
- Label: Warner Bros./Curb
- Songwriter(s): Hank Williams Jr.
- Producer(s): Jimmy Bowen, Hank Williams Jr.

Hank Williams Jr. singles chronology
"Man of Steel" (1984)	"Attitude Adjustment" (1984)	"All My Rowdy Friends Are Coming Over Tonight" (1984)

"Attitude Adjustment" is a song written and recorded by American singer-songwriter and musician Hank Williams Jr. It was released in June 1984 as the first single from the album Major Moves. The song reached number 5 on the Billboard Hot Country Singles & Tracks chart.

== Chart performance ==
Chart (1984)	Peak position
US Hot Country Songs (Billboard)	5
Canadian RPM Country Tracks	7
