= This Ain't Dallas =

Single by Hank Williams Jr.

from the album Five-O
- B-side: "I Really Like Girls"
- Released: September 2, 1985
- Genre: Country
- Length: 2:44
- Label: Warner Bros./Curb
- Songwriter: Hank Williams Jr.
- Producers: Jimmy Bowen, Hank Williams Jr.

Hank Williams Jr. singles chronology
"I'm for Love" (1985)	"This Ain't Dallas" (1985)	"Two Old Cats Like Us" (1985)

"This Ain't Dallas" is a song written and recorded by American singer-songwriter and musician Hank Williams Jr. It was released in September 1985 as the second single from the album Five-O. The song reached number 4 on the Billboard Hot Country Singles & Tracks chart.

== Content ==
The song's title and subject refer to the television series Dallas, with Williams denying that he and his family live a life comparable to those on popular prime-time serials of the era, including Dallas and Dynasty. Williams name-checks a number of popular characters from both shows, including J. R. Ewing and Sue Ellen Ewing from Dallas and Alexis Carrington from Dynasty, among many others, noting that the female characters are attractive but unrealistic. In the end, Williams turns off the television set.

== Chart performance ==
Chart (1985)	Peak position
US Hot Country Songs (Billboard)	4
Canadian RPM Country Tracks	22
