= Gonna Go Huntin' Tonight =

Single by Hank Williams Jr.

from the album Strong Stuff
- B-side: "Twodot, Montana"
- Released: January 10, 1983
- Genre: Country
- Length: 2:34
- Label: Elektra/Curb
- Songwriter(s): Hank Williams Jr.
- Producer(s): Jimmy Bowen, Hank Williams Jr.

Hank Williams Jr. singles chronology
| "The American Dream" (1982) | "Gonna Go Huntin' Tonight" (1983) | "Leave Them Boys Alone" (1983) |

"Gonna Go Huntin' Tonight" is a song written and recorded by American singer-songwriter and musician Hank Williams Jr. It was released in January 1983 as the first single from the album Strong Stuff. The song reached number four on the Billboard Hot Country Singles & Tracks chart.

== Chart performance ==
| Chart (1983) | Peak position |
|---|---|
| US Hot Country Songs (Billboard) | 4 |
| Canadian RPM Country Tracks | 4 |
