= Man of Steel (album) =

Studio album by Hank Williams Jr.
- Released: September 1983
- Length: 34:04
- Label: Warner Bros./Curb
- Producer: Jimmy Bowen; Hank Williams Jr.

Hank Williams Jr. chronology
Strong Stuff (1983)	Man of Steel (1983)	Major Moves (1984)

Singles from Man of Steel
- 1. "Queen of My Heart" Released: November 1983; 2. "Man of Steel" Released: February 18, 1984

Professional ratings
Review scores
Source	Rating
Allmusic	2.5/5 stars

Man of Steel is the thirty-sixth studio album by American musician Hank Williams Jr. It was released by Warner Bros./Curb Records in September 1983, peaking at number 3 on the Billboard Top Country Albums chart. The title track of the album and the song "Queen of My Heart" were released as singles, peaking at number 3 and number 5 respectively on the Billboard Hot Country Singles & Tracks chart. Man of Steel was Williams' tenth album to reach the top five on the Top Country Albums chart and was his tenth album to be certified Gold by the RIAA. Man of Steel was nominated by the Academy of Country Music for the Album of the Year award in 1984.

== Track listing ==
No.	Title	Writer(s)	Length
1.	"Man of Steel"	Hank Williams Jr.	4:38
2.	"The Air That I Breathe"	Albert Hammond, Mike Hazlewood	4:03
3.	"Woman on the Run"	Bobby Keel, Tana Keel, Tony Stampley, Williams	3:17
4.	"She Had Me"	Williams	2:06
5.	"Midnight Rider"	Gregg Allman, Robert Payne	2:51
6.	"Lovesick Blues" (featuring Leon Redbone)	Cliff Friend, Irving Mills	2:11
7.	"Queen of My Heart"	Williams	3:46
8.	"Now I Know How George Feels" (featuring George Jones)	Williams	2:43
9.	"It Just Don't Get It No More"	Tony Joe White	2:48
10.	"Orange Blossom Special"	Ervin T. Rouse	5:55

== Chart performance ==
Chart (1983)	Peak position
U.S. Billboard Top Country Albums	3
U.S. Billboard 200	116

== Certifications ==
Region	Certification	Certified units/sales
United States (RIAA)	Gold	500,000^{^}
^{^} Shipments figures based on certification alone.
