= Country Girls (John Schneider song) =

Single by John Schneider

from the album Too Good to Stop Now
- B-side: "The Time of My Life"
- Released: December 1984
- Recorded: 1984
- Genre: Country
- Length: 3:11
- Label: MCA
- Songwriter(s): Troy Seals and Eddie Setser
- Producer(s): Jimmy Bowen

John Schneider singles chronology
"I've Been Around Enough to Know" (1984)	"Country Girls" (1984)	"It's a Short Walk from Heaven to Hell" (1985)

"Country Girls" is a song written by Troy Seals and Eddie Setser, and recorded by American country music artist and The Dukes of Hazzard cast member John Schneider. It was released in December 1984 as the second single from the album Too Good to Stop Now. The song was Schneider's second number one on the country chart. The single went to number one for one week, and spent a total of fourteen weeks on the country chart.

== Charts ==
=== Weekly charts ===
Chart (1984–1985)	Peak position
US Hot Country Songs (Billboard)	1
Canadian RPM Country Tracks	1

=== Year-end charts ===
Chart (1985)	Position
US Hot Country Songs (Billboard)	27
