= You're the Last Thing I Needed Tonight =

Single by John Schneider

from the album A Memory Like You
- B-side: "One More Night"
- Released: April 1986
- Genre: Country
- Length: 3:23
- Label: MCA
- Songwriters: Don Pfrimmer; David Wills
- Producers: Jimmy Bowen, John Schneider

John Schneider singles chronology
"What's a Memory Like You (Doing in a Love Like This)" (1985)	"You're the Last Thing I Needed Tonight" (1986)	"At the Sound of the Tone" (1986)

"You're the Last Thing I Needed Tonight" is a song written by Don Pfrimmer and David Wills, and recorded by American country music artist and The Dukes of Hazzard cast member John Schneider. It was released in April 1986 as the second single from the album A Memory Like You. The song was Schneider's fourth and last number one on the country chart. The single went to number one for one week and spent a total of fifteen weeks on the country chart.

== Chart performance ==
Chart (1986)	Peak position
US Hot Country Songs (Billboard)	1
Canadian RPM Country Tracks	1
