= Love, You Ain't Seen the Last of Me =

Single by John Schneider

from the album You Ain't Seen the Last of Me
- B-side: "Credit"
- Released: April 4, 1987
- Genre: Country
- Length: 4:01
- Label: MCA
- Songwriter: Kendal Franceschi
- Producers: Jimmy Bowen, John Schneider

John Schneider singles chronology
"Take the Long Way Home" (1987)	"Love, You Ain't Seen the Last of Me" (1987)	"When the Right One Comes Along" (1987)

"Love, You Ain't Seen the Last of Me"

Single by Tracy Byrd

from the album It's About Time
- B-side: "Put Your Hand in Mine"
- Released: April 1, 2000
- Genre: Country
- Length: 3:31
- Label: RCA Nashville
- Songwriter: Kendal Franceschi
- Producers: Billy Joe Walker, Jr., Tracy Byrd

Tracy Byrd singles chronology
"Put Your Hand in Mine" (1999)	"Love, You Ain't Seen the Last of Me" (2000)	"Take Me with You When You Go" (2000)

"Love, You Ain't Seen the Last of Me" is a song written by Kendal Franceschi, and first recorded by American country music artist and actor Mac Davis on his 1982 album Forty 82. It was more successfully covered by American country music artist and actor John Schneider in April 1987 as the first single from his album You Ain't Seen the Last of Me. The song reached number 6 on the Billboard Hot Country Singles & Tracks chart.

The song was again covered by Tracy Byrd on his 1999 album It's About Time. It was released as the album's second single in April 2000 and peaked at number 44 on the Billboard Hot Country Singles & Tracks chart.

== Chart performance ==
=== John Schneider ===
Chart (1987)	Peak position
US Hot Country Songs (Billboard)	6
Canadian RPM Country Tracks	4

=== Tracy Byrd ===
Chart (2000)	Peak position
Canada Country Singles (RPM)	63
US Hot Country Songs (Billboard)	44
