= Strong Stuff =

Studio album by Hank Williams Jr.
- Released: February 1983
- Genre: Southern rock, Country rock, Country
- Length: 36:44
- Label: Elektra/Curb
- Producer: Jimmy Bowen; Hank Williams Jr.

Hank Williams Jr. chronology
Hank Williams Jr.'s Greatest Hits (1982)	Strong Stuff (1983)	Man of Steel (1983)

Singles from Strong Stuff
- 1. "Gonna Go Huntin' Tonight" Released: January 10, 1983; 2. "Leave Them Boys Alone" Released: May 1983

Strong Stuff is the 35th studio album by American musician Hank Williams Jr. It was released by Elektra/Curb Records in February 1983. "Gonna Go Huntin' Tonight" and "Leave Them Boys Alone" were released as singles. The album peaked at number seven on the Billboard Top Country Albums chart and has been certified Gold by the RIAA.

== Music ==
The music of Strong Stuff is predominantly Southern rock, such as the cover of ZZ Top's John Lee Hooker-esque song "La Grange".

== Critical reception ==
Professional ratings
Review scores
Source	Rating
Allmusic	2.5/5 stars

While he praised the closing cut ("In this stately ballad about a lover's struggle with drugs, Hank's baritone coos, breaks, and flutters like a wounded butterfly as spare accompaniment by piano, harmonica, and guitar pushes but never intrudes"), Lee Ballinger of Record gave the album an overall negative review. He was especially critical of "A Whole Lot of Hank", describing it as "a recitation of unconnected cliches ... carried bumpily along by a plodding instrumental track". He found some of the other songs overly similar to "A Whole Lot of Hank", and referred to "Leave Them Boys Alone" as "the obligatory song about other Southern musicians".

== Track listing ==
No.	Title	Writer(s)	Length
1.	"Gonna Go Huntin' Tonight"	Hank Williams Jr.	2:36
2.	"La Grange"	Frank Beard, Billy Gibbons, Dusty Hill	5:21
3.	"A Whole Lot of Hank"	"Wild" Bill Emerson, Jody Emerson, Williams	2:55
4.	"Made in the Shade"	Ronnie Van Zant	4:35
5.	"Leave Them Boys Alone" (with Waylon Jennings and Ernest Tubb)	Dean Dillon, Gary Stewart, Tanya Tucker, Williams	3:36
6.	"The Girl on the Front Row at Fort Worth"	Williams	2:38
7.	"The Homecoming Queen"	Williams	4:22
8.	"Blue Jean Blues"	Beard, Gibbons, Hill	4:07
9.	"Twodot Montana"	Williams	2:39
10.	"In the Arms of Cocaine"	Flash Gordon, Buzz Rabin, Williams	4:08

== Personnel ==
- Kenny Bell – acoustic guitar
- David Briggs – keyboards
- Paul Hatfield – keyboards
- David Hungate – bass guitar
- Waylon Jennings – vocals on "Leave Them Boys Alone"
- Terry McMillan – harmonica
- Kenny Mims – electric guitar
- Farrell Morris – percussion
- Larry Muhoberac – keyboards
- Weldon Myrick – steel guitar
- Steve Nathan – keyboards
- Brent Rowan – electric guitar
- Gove Scrivenor – autoharp
- Randy Scruggs – dobro, acoustic guitar
- Denis Solee – saxophone
- Ernest Tubb – vocals on "Leave Them Boys Alone"
- Wayne Turner – electric guitar
- Billy Joe Walker Jr. – acoustic guitar
- Hank Williams Jr. – dobro, acoustic guitar, keyboards, lead vocals
- Reggie Young – electric guitar

== Chart performance ==
Chart (1983)	Peak position
U.S. Billboard Top Country Albums	7
U.S. Billboard 200	64

== Certifications ==
Region	Certification	Certified units/sales
United States (RIAA)	Gold	500,000^{^}
^{^} Shipments figures based on certification alone.
