= What's a Memory Like You (Doing in a Love Like This) =

Single by John Schneider

from the album A Memory Like You
- B-side: "The One Who Got Away"
- Released: December 1985
- Genre: Country
- Length: 3:25
- Label: MCA
- Songwriter(s): Charles Quillen; John Jarrard
- Producer(s): Jimmy Bowen, John Schneider

John Schneider singles chronology
"I'm Gonna Leave You Tomorrow" (1985)	"What's a Memory Like You (Doing in a Love Like This)" (1985)	"You're the Last Thing I Needed Tonight" (1986)

"What's a Memory Like You (Doing in a Love Like This)" is a song written by Charles Quillen and John Jarrard, and recorded by American country music artist and The Dukes of Hazzard cast member John Schneider. It was released in December 1985 as the first single from the album A Memory Like You. The song was Schneider's third number one on the country chart. The single went to number one for one week and spent a total of fourteen weeks on the country chart.

It was originally recorded by Conway Twitty on his 1985 album Chasin' Rainbows.

== Chart performance ==
Chart (1985–1986)	Peak position
US Hot Country Songs (Billboard)	1
Canadian RPM Country Tracks	1
