= At the Sound of the Tone =

Single by John Schneider

from the album Take the Long Way Home
- B-side: "This Time"
- Released: August 30, 1986
- Genre: Country
- Length: 3:05
- Label: MCA
- Songwriters: Dave Richardson, Max T. Barnes
- Producers: Jimmy Bowen, John Schneider

John Schneider singles chronology
| "You're the Last Thing I Needed Tonight" (1986) | "At the Sound of the Tone" (1986) | "Take the Long Way Home" (1987) |

"At the Sound of the Tone" is a song written by Dave Richardson and Max T. Barnes, and recorded by actor and American country music artist John Schneider. It was released in August 1986 as the first single from the album Take the Long Way Home. The song reached number 5 on the Billboard Hot Country Singles & Tracks chart.

== Content ==
Use of the answering machine – still a relatively novel device to most American households in the mid-1980s – is at the centerpiece of this "dying relationship" story. Here, a young man, whose relationship with a longtime girlfriend has apparently been in trouble for some time (due to his inability to find time to spend with her), is trying to call her home phone to cancel a lunch date due to an unexpected work commitment. Nobody answers and the call goes to an answering machine, where – as told in the lyrics – the man hears the following:

I'm sorry, I can't take your call/cause I'm packing up to go away.
And John, if that's you/you'll just cancel the lunch anyway.
Ah, you used to find the time/but now you don't even try.
So at the sound of the tone/you're on your own, goodbye.

Upset at what he just heard, and realizing what it means, the young man hails a taxi cab and rushes over to his girlfriend's house, hoping to catch her before she leaves and try to explain things. However, what he finds is even more upsetting: A vacant house, with only the answering machine left behind. As tears well up in his eyes, he again listens to the greeting and – remembering happier times – realizes what he has just lost.

== Chart performance ==
| Chart (1986) | Peak position |
|---|---|
| US Hot Country Songs (Billboard) | 5 |
| Canadian RPM Country Tracks | 16 |
