= The Pressure Is On =

Studio album by Hank Williams Jr.
- Released: August 1981
- Genre: Outlaw country; country
- Length: 34:13
- Label: Elektra/Curb
- Producer: Jimmy Bowen

Hank Williams Jr. chronology
Rowdy (1981)	The Pressure Is On (1981)	High Notes (1982)

Singles from The Pressure Is On
- 1. "All My Rowdy Friends (Have Settled Down)" Released: September 5, 1981; 2. "A Country Boy Can Survive" Released: January 18, 1982

Professional ratings
Review scores
Source	Rating
Allmusic	4/5 stars

The Pressure Is On is the thirty-third studio album by American musician Hank Williams Jr. It was released by Elektra/Curb Records in August 1981 and was Williams' seventh studio album on the Elektra/Curb label.

== Critical and commercial success ==
The Pressure Is On was Williams' fifth consecutive Top 10 album for Curb, peaking at number 5 on the Billboard Top Country Albums chart. Two songs, "All My Rowdy Friends (Have Settled Down)" and "A Country Boy Can Survive" were released as singles, with "All My Rowdy Friends" peaking at Number One on the Billboard Hot Country Songs & Tracks chart, giving Williams his fifth career Number One single, while "A Country Boy Can Survive" peaked at number 2. They have become signature songs for Williams and remain among the most popular of his career. The album and singles were well received by critics, earning Williams an Academy of Country Music nomination for Top Male Vocalist. It was also a major commercial success for Williams and was certified Platinum by the RIAA, making it Williams' fourth album to be certified Gold and his second to be certified Platinum.

== Track listing ==
All tracks are written by Hank Williams Jr., unless otherwise noted.

No.	Title	Writer(s)	Length
1.	"A Country Boy Can Survive"		4:16
2.	"The Coalition to Ban Coalitions"		2:10
3.	"Tennessee Stud"	Jimmy Driftwood	3:27
4.	"Ramblin' in My Shoes" (featuring Boxcar Willie)	"Wild" Bill Emerson, Vince Emerson	3:13
5.	"The Pressure Is On"		4:13
6.	"All My Rowdy Friends (Have Settled Down)"		3:58
7.	"I Don't Care (If Tomorrow Never Comes)" (featuring George Jones)	Hank Williams	2:41
8.	"Weatherman"		3:39
9.	"Everytime I Hear That Song"		3:15
10.	"Ballad of Hank" (featuring Don Helms)	Jimmy Driftwood, Don Helms	3:21
Total length:			34:13

== Personnel ==
- Guitar: Kenny Bell, Bobby Thompson, Billy Joe Walker Jr., Paul Worley, Reggie Young
- Steel Guitar: "Cowboy" Eddie Long, Sonny Garrish
- Banjo: Bobby Thompson. Dobro: Mike Auldridge, Hank Williams
- Mandolin: Vernon Derrick, Kieran Kane
- Sitar: Reggie Young
- Drums: James Stroud
- Bass Guitar: Joe Osborn, Bob Wray
- Keyboards: Larry Knechtel, Mike Lawler, Tony Migliore, Hargus "Pig" Robbins
- Fiddle: Lisa Silver, Vernon Derrick
- Viola: Buddy Spicher
- Clarinet: Jerry Vinett
- Horns: Irv Kane, Terry Mead
- Train Whistle: Boxcar Willie
- Harmonica: Terry McMillan (musician)

== Production ==
- Produced by Jimmy Bowen
- Recorded at Sounds Stage Studios, Nashville, Tennessee
- Engineered by Ron Treat, Jimmy Bowen and Steve Tillisch
- Mastered at Masterfonics by Glenn Meadows
- Album Art Direction: Ron Caro and Norm Ung
- Album Design by Norm Ung
- Album Photography by Ron Slenzak

== Chart performance ==
=== Weekly charts ===
Chart (1981–1982)	Peak position
U.S. Billboard Top Country Albums	5
U.S. Billboard 200	76

=== Year-end charts ===
Chart (1982)	Position
U.S. Billboard Top Country Albums	6

=== Singles ===
Single	Chart	Position
"All My Rowdy Friends (Have Settled Down)"	Canada Country Songs (RPM)	1
"All My Rowdy Friends (Have Settled Down)"	U.S. Hot Country Songs (Billboard)	1
"A Country Boy Can Survive"	Canada Country Songs (RPM)	2
"A Country Boy Can Survive"	U.S. Hot Country Songs (Billboard)	2

== Certifications ==
Region	Certification	Certified units/sales
United States (RIAA)	Platinum	1,000,000^{^}
^{^} Shipments figures based on certification alone.
