= Five-O (album) =

Studio album by Hank Williams Jr.
- Released: April 29, 1985
- Studios: The Castle (Franklin, Tennessee); Emerald Sound (Nashville, Tennessee); Sound Stage (Nashville, Tennessee)
- Genre: Outlaw country
- Length: 35:28
- Label: Warner Bros.
- Producers: Jimmy Bowen; Hank Williams Jr.

Hank Williams Jr. chronology
Hank Williams, Jr.'s Greatest Hits, Vol. 2 (1985)	Five-O (1985)	Montana Cafe (1986)

Singles from Five-O
- 1. "I'm for Love" Released: May 11, 1985; 2. "This Ain't Dallas" Released: September 2, 1985; 3. "Ain't Misbehavin'" Released: February 1986

Professional ratings
Review scores
Source	Rating
Allmusic	2/5 stars

Five-O is the thirty-eighth studio album by American musician Hank Williams Jr. It was released by Warner Bros. Records on April 29, 1985. "I'm for Love," "This Ain't Dallas" and "Ain't Misbehavin'" were released as singles, reaching No. 1, No. 4 and No. 1 on the Billboard Hot Country Singles chart. The album reached No. 1 on the Top Country Albums chart, becoming his second No. 1 album, and has been certified Gold by the RIAA.

Along with its commercial success, Five-O garnered a great deal of recognition within the music industry. The Academy of Country Music nominated Five-O for Album of the Year and Williams for Top Male Vocalist. The Country Music Association also nominated Williams for Male Vocalist of the Year. At the 1987 Grammy Awards, Williams was nominated for Best Country Vocal Performance, Male for his version of "Ain't Misbehavin'".

== Track listing ==
No.	Title	Writer(s)	Length
1.	"I'm for Love"	Hank Williams Jr.	2:57
2.	"I Really Like Girls"	George Thorogood	2:43
3.	"The Nashville Scene"	Williams, Tony Stampley, Buck Moore	2:56
4.	"Ain't Misbehavin'"	Fats Waller, Andy Razaf, Harry Brooks	4:35
5.	"Something to Believe In"	Williams	4:09
6.	"Lawyers, Guns and Money"	Warren Zevon	3:11
7.	"This Ain't Dallas"	Williams	2:44
8.	"I've Been Around"	Williams	3:15
9.	"New Orleans"	Joseph Royster, Frank Guida	3:28
10.	"Outlaw's Rewards"	Williams	5:41

== Personnel ==
- Ray Barrickman - bass guitar
- Matt Betton - drums
- Dean Bradley - acoustic guitar
- Emory Gordy Jr. - bass guitar
- Paul Hatfield - Fender Rhodes, keyboards
- John Hobbs - keyboards
- John Barlow Jarvis - keyboards
- "Cowboy" Eddie Long - pedal steel guitar
- Bill Marshall - drums
- Jerry McKinney - soprano saxophone, tenor saxophone
- Terry McMillan (musician) - synare on "I'm for Love"
- Edgar Meyer - acro bass on "Ain't Misbehavin'"
- Lamar Morris - acoustic guitar, electric guitar
- Steve Schaffer - synclavier on "Outlaw's Reward"
- Randy Scruggs - acoustic guitar
- George Thorogood - electric guitar and slide guitar on "I Really Like Girls"
- Wayne Turner - electric guitar
- Wendy Waldman - background vocals on "Something to Believe In"
- Billy Joe Walker Jr. - acoustic guitar, electric guitar
- Hank Williams Jr. - electric guitar, lead vocals
- Reggie Young - electric guitar

== Charts ==
=== Weekly charts ===
Chart (1985)	Peak position
US Billboard 200	72
US Top Country Albums (Billboard)	1

=== Year-end charts ===
Chart (1985)	Position
US Top Country Albums (Billboard)	7

== Certifications ==
Region	Certification	Certified units/sales
United States (RIAA)	Gold	500,000^{^}
^{^} Shipments figures based on certification alone.
