= All My Rowdy Friends Are Coming Over Tonight =

Single by Hank Williams Jr.

from the album Major Moves
- B-side: "Video Blues"
- Released: October 1, 1984
- Recorded: 1984
- Genre: Country
- Length: 2:57 (album and single version); 2:17 (Monday Night Football version); 4:28 (dance mix)
- Label: Warner Bros.; Curb
- Songwriter: Hank Williams Jr.
- Producers: Jimmy Bowen; Hank Williams Jr.

Hank Williams Jr. singles chronology
"Attitude Adjustment" (1984)	"All My Rowdy Friends Are Coming Over Tonight" (1984)	"Major Moves" (1985)

"All My Rowdy Friends Are Coming Over Tonight" is a song written and recorded by American musician Hank Williams Jr. It was released in October 1984 as the second single from his album Major Moves. It peaked at number ten on the country music charts. From 1989 to 2011, Williams performed a version of the song (reworked as "All My Rowdy Friends Are Here on Monday Night") as the opening theme to Monday Night Football. The song was reinstated in 2017, with a new version by Williams Jr., Florida Georgia Line and Jason Derulo.

== Music video ==
Directed by John Goodhue, the music video for the song features artists such as George Jones driving a riding mower; Willie Nelson and Waylon Jennings playing poker; Little Jimmy Dickens and Paul Williams carrying a keg of beer; Cheech & Chong stumbling out of a smoke-filled limousine; William Lee Golden (of The Oak Ridge Boys) hitchhiking; Duane Allen (The Oak Ridge Boys) as a chauffeur; and George Thorogood entertaining other celebrities like Mel Tillis, Bobby Bare holding up a whiskey bottle, Kris Kristofferson, Grandpa Jones, Porter Wagoner, Jim Varney, at Hank Jr.'s "party pad out in the woods." At the end of the video, a ghostly Cadillac flies into the night sky, referencing the fact that his father, Hank Williams, died while riding in a Cadillac.

== Single and album versions ==
The album version is different from the single (and video) version, which changes the lines "ready to get the summer/summertime started" in the last two choruses to "ready to get the music started" in the second chorus and "c'mon and get your motor started" in the final chorus.

== Commercial and critical success ==
The single would go on to become one of Williams's signature songs (thanks to Monday Night Football) and became his 26th career Top 10 single on the Billboard Hot Country Singles & Tracks chart. It also garnered a number of prestigious music industry awards and nominations. The music video became the inaugural winner for both the Country Music Association and Academy of Country Music Music Video of the Year award. Williams's vocal performance earned him a nomination for Country Music Association Awards as well as Grammy Award nominations for Grammy Awards for Best Country Song and Grammy Award for Best Male Country Vocal Performance in 1985.

== Cover versions ==
Rock music singer Steven Tyler covered the song from the television special CMT Giants: Hank Williams Jr. American country singer Tucker Wetmore covered the song at the 60th Annual CMA Awards.

== Chart performance ==
Chart (1984)	Peak position
US Hot Country Songs (Billboard)	10

== Certifications ==
Region	Certification	Certified units/sales
United States (RIAA)	Gold	500,000^{‡}
^{‡} Sales+streaming figures based on certification alone.
