= The Voice (American TV series) season 13 =

Season of the US television series

The Voice
- Season 13
- Promotional poster featuring coaches Hudson, Shelton, Cyrus, and Levine
- Hosted by: Carson Daly
- Coaches: Adam Levine; Miley Cyrus; Jennifer Hudson; Blake Shelton
- No. of contestants: 48 artists
- Winner: Chloe Kohanski
- Winning coach: Blake Shelton
- Runner-up: Addison Agen
- No. of episodes: 27

Release
- Original network: NBC
- Original release: September 25 – December 19, 2017

Season chronology
- ← Previous; Season 12 Next → Season 14

The thirteenth season of the American reality talent show The Voice premiered on September 25, 2017, on NBC. Adam Levine and Blake Shelton returned for their thirteenth season as coaches. Meanwhile, Miley Cyrus returned after a one-season absence replacing Gwen Stefani, and new coach Jennifer Hudson joined the panel replacing Alicia Keys.

Chloe Kohanski was named the winner of the season, marking Blake Shelton's record-extending sixth win as a coach, and making her the third stolen artist to win, following Josh Kaufman in season 6 and Craig Wayne Boyd in season 7. For the first time, the Top 3 artists were all female and originally belonged to the same team, that of Cyrus. Cyrus also make history as the first coach to have an all female team, making her the first coach to achieve this.

== Coaches and hosts ==
Coaches and Host of The Voice Season 13

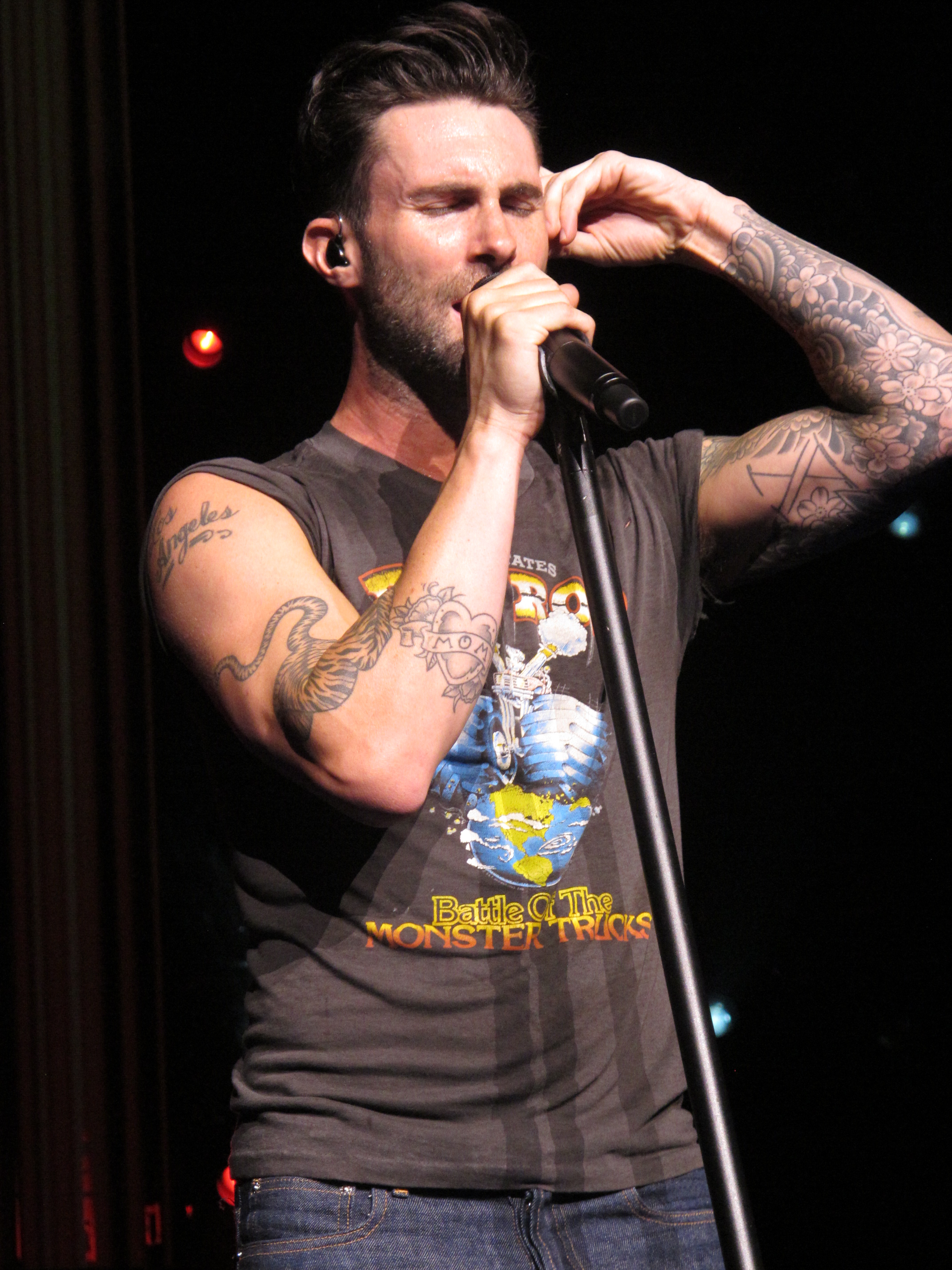
Adam Levine

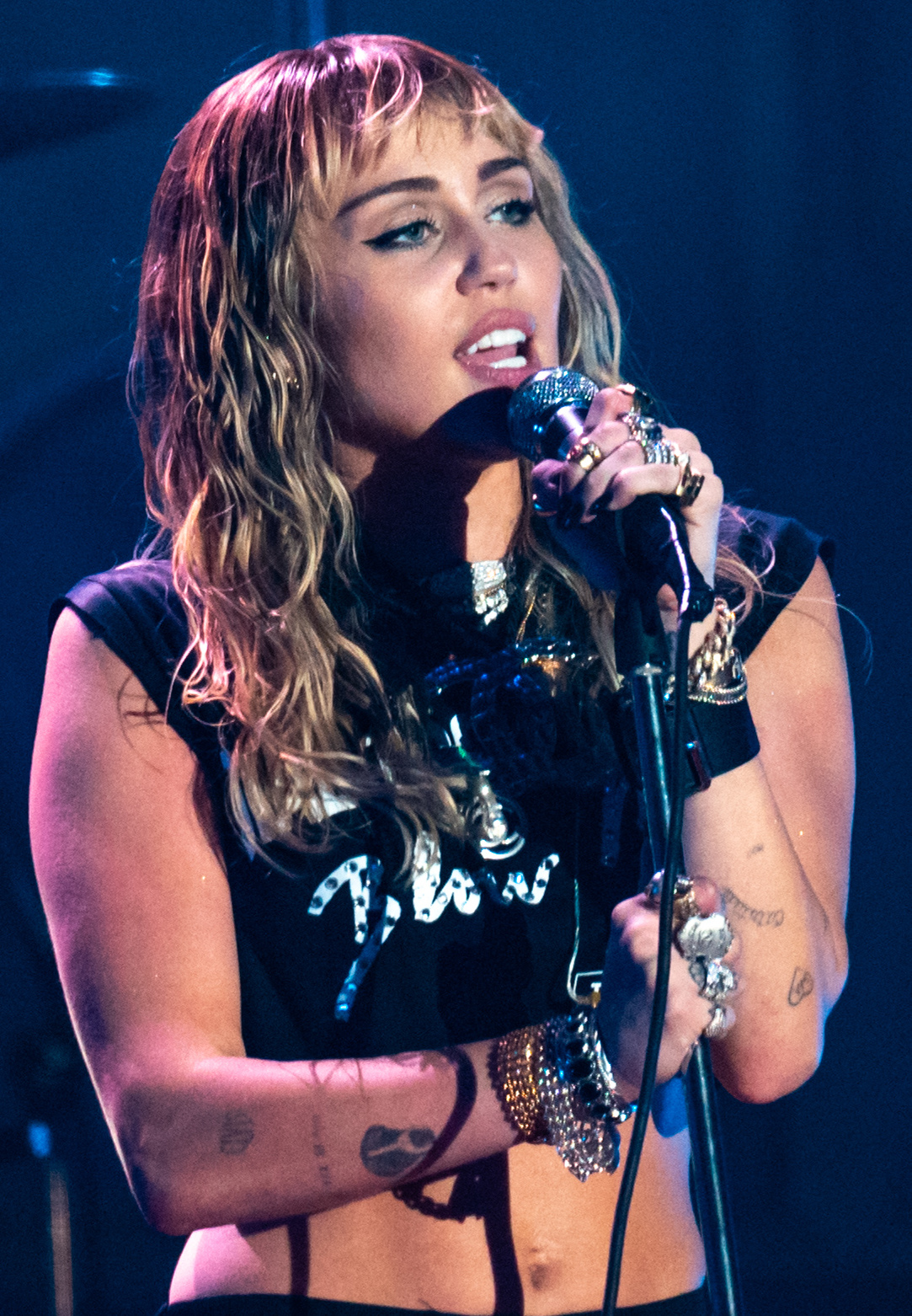
Miley Cyrus

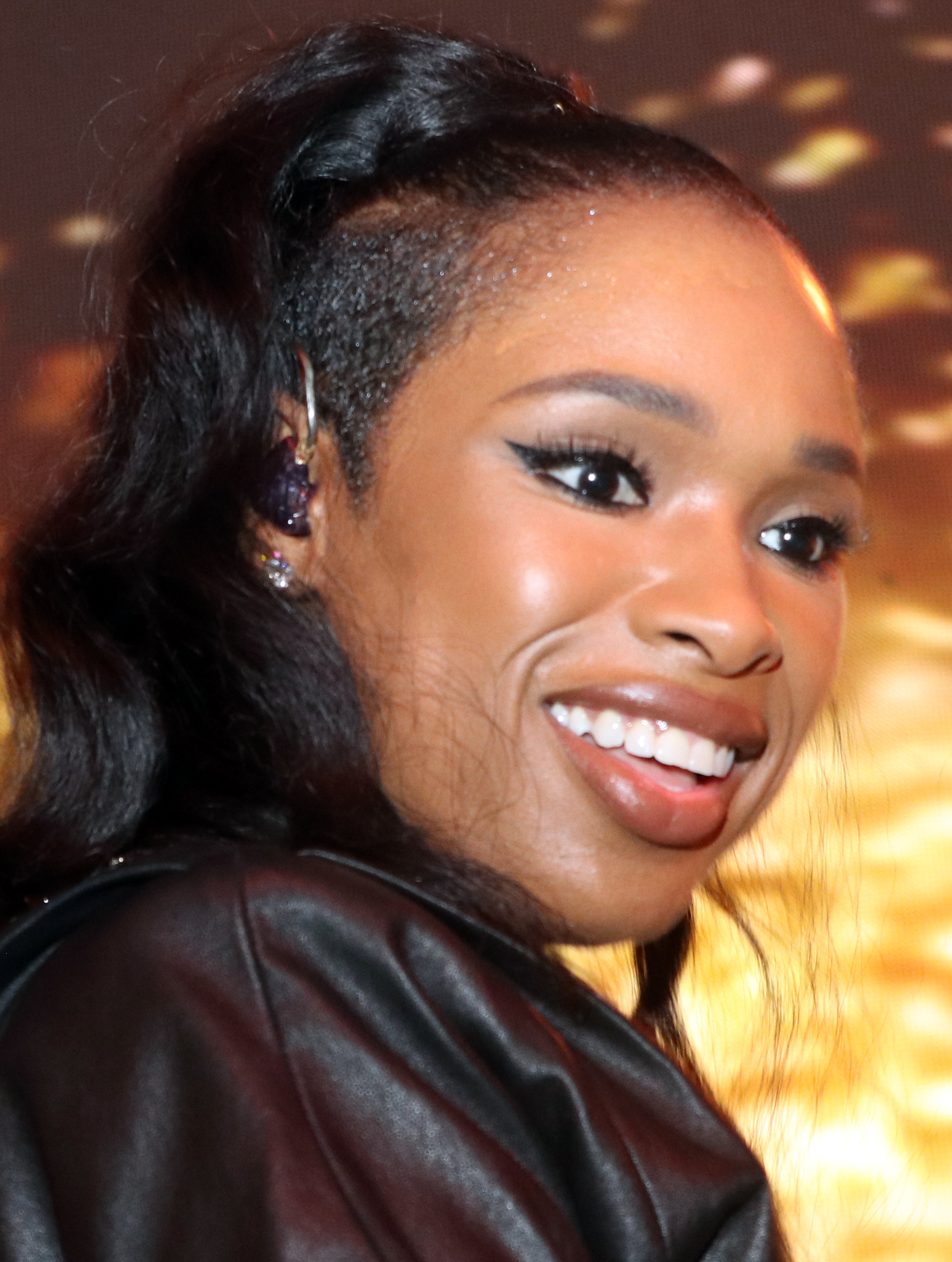
Jennifer Hudson

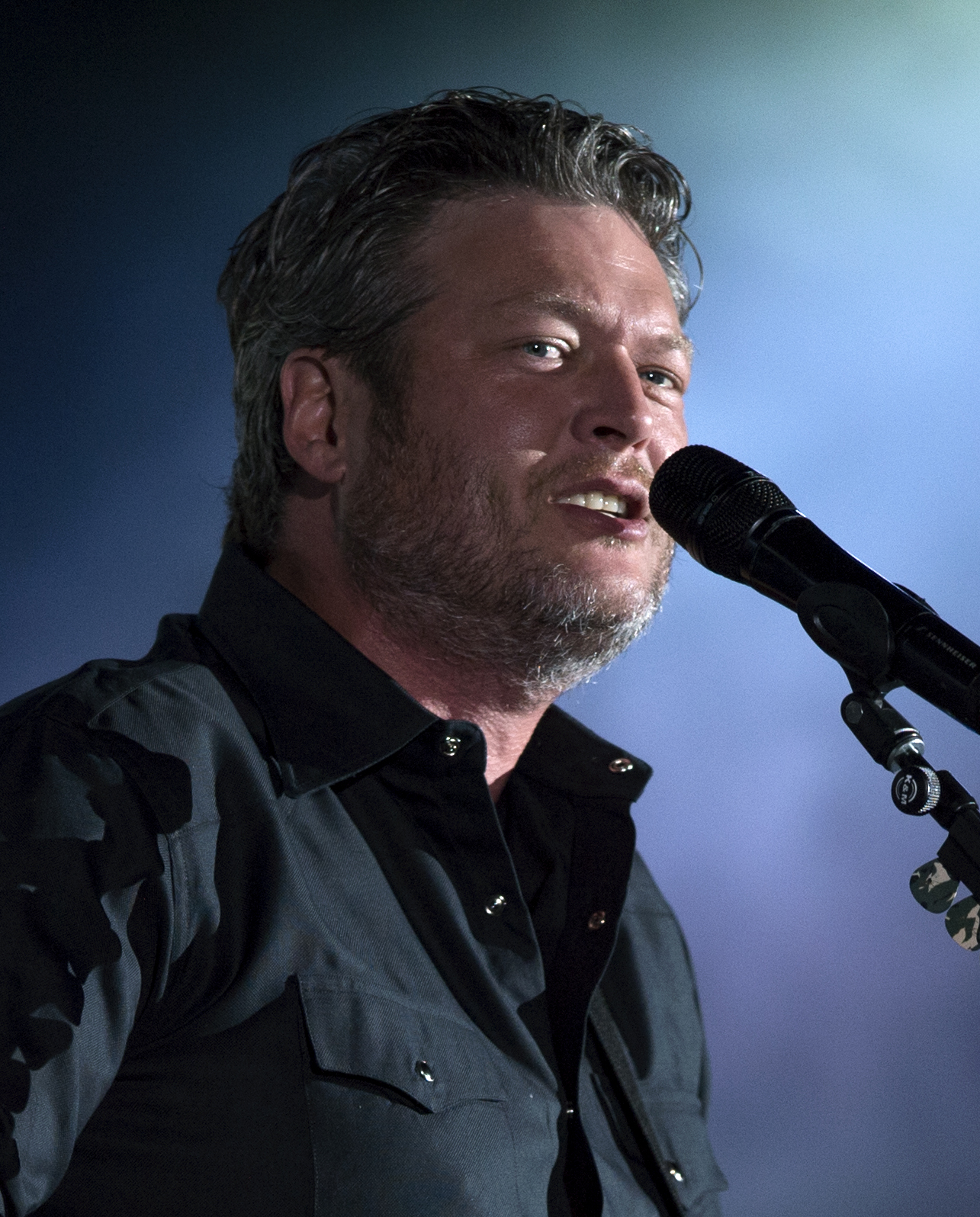
Blake Shelton

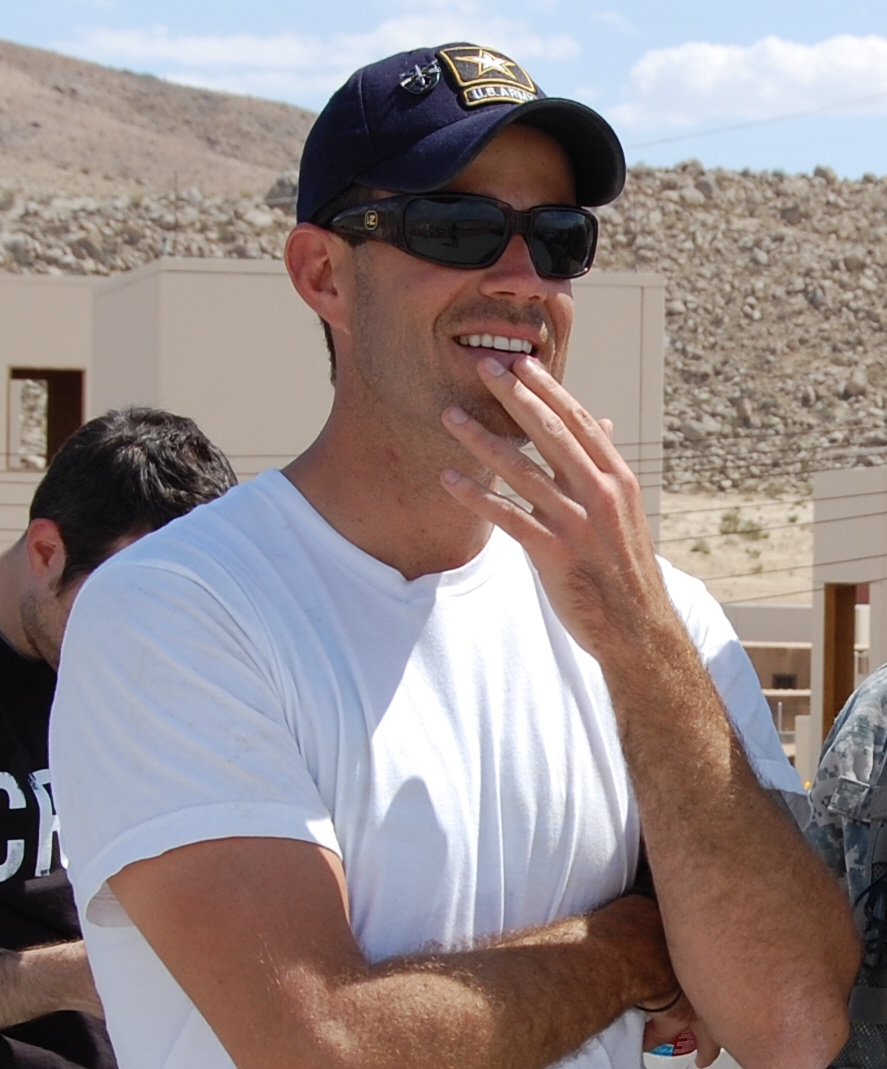
Carson Daly

The coach lineup changed once again for the thirteenth season. Gwen Stefani and Alicia Keys did not return as coaches. They were replaced by Miley Cyrus, who returned after a one-season hiatus, along with returning coaches Adam Levine and Blake Shelton. On May 10, 2017, NBC announced that Jennifer Hudson would join as a coach, following her success on The Voice UK, Alicia Keys returned for Season 14 in the spring of 2018. Carson Daly returned for his thirteenth season as host.

This season, for the first time since season 6, the Playoffs did not kick off the live rounds and voting. Instead, the Top 12 were chosen by the coaches. In previous seasons, the finalists were partially determined by viewers’ votes.

This season's Battle advisors were: Joe Jonas for Team Adam, Kelly Rowland for Team Jennifer, Billy Ray Cyrus for Team Miley, Rascal Flatts for Team Blake. Kelly Clarkson was a key advisor for all of the teams.

== Teams ==
Color key

- Winner
- Runner-up
- Third place
- Fourth place
- Eliminated in the Live Shows
- Eliminated in the Playoffs
- Selected by another coach as their Coach Comeback
- Stolen in the Knockout rounds
- Eliminated in the Knockout rounds
- Stolen in the Battle rounds
- Eliminated in the Battle rounds

| Coaches | Top 48 artists | | | | | |
|---|---|---|---|---|---|---|
| Adam Levine | | | | | | |
| Adam Levine | Addison Agen | Adam Cunningham | Jon Mero | Anthony Alexander | **Whitney Fenimore** | Emily Luther |
| Adam Levine | ~~Hannah Mrozak~~ | ~~Adam Pearce~~ | Dennis Drummond | Dylan Gerard | ~~Whitney Fenimore~~ | Brandon Brown |
| Adam Levine | Gary Carpentier | Dave Crosby | Michael Kight | Brandon Showell | | |
| Miley Cyrus | | | | | | |
| Miley Cyrus | Brooke Simpson | Ashland Craft | Janice Freeman | Moriah Formica | Adam Pearce | **Karli Webster** |
| Miley Cyrus | ~~Whitney Fenimore~~ | ~~Chloe Kohanski~~ | Stephan Marcellus | ~~Addison Agen~~ | ~~Katrina Rose~~ | ~~Megan Rose~~ |
| Miley Cyrus | Ilianna Viramontes | Sophia Bollman | Shilo Gold | | | |
| Jennifer Hudson | | | | | | |
| Jennifer Hudson | Noah Mac | Davon Fleming | Shi'Ann Jones | **Lucas Holliday** | Hannah Mrozak | Chris Weaver |
| Jennifer Hudson | Eric Lyn | Jeremiah Miller | Katrina Rose | ~~Kathrina Feigh~~ | ~~Stephan Marcellus~~ | Ignatious Carmouche |
| Jennifer Hudson | Alexandra Joyce | Maharasyi Hansa | Meagan McNeal | | | |
| Blake Shelton | | | | | | |
| Blake Shelton | Chloe Kohanski | Red Marlow | Keisha Renee | Mitchell Lee | **Natalie Stovall** | Esera Tuaolo |
| Blake Shelton | ~~Adam Cunningham~~ | Anna Catherine DeHart | Kathrina Feigh | Megan Rose | ~~Dennis Drummond~~ | ~~Noah Mac~~ |
| Blake Shelton | Rebecca Brunner | Kristi Hoopes | Ryan Scripps | | | |
Note: Italicized names are stolen artists (names struck through within former teams). Bolded names are artists who received the Coach Comeback and advanced to the Playoffs.

== Blind auditions ==
Color key

| ✔ | Coach pressed "I WANT YOU" button |
| | Artist defaulted to a coach's team |
| | Artist selected to join this coach's team |
| | Artist eliminated with no coach pressing their button |

=== Episode 1 (Sept. 25) ===
| Order | Artist | Age | Hometown | Song | Coach's and artist's choices | | | |
| Order | Artist | Age | Hometown | Song | Adam | Miley | Jennifer | Blake |
|---|---|---|---|---|---|---|---|---|
| 1 | Chris Weaver | 29 | Long Island, New York | "Try a Little Tenderness" | ✔ | ✔ | ✔ | ✔ |
| 2 | Mitchell Lee | 29 | Charleston, South Carolina | "Hold My Hand" | ✔ | — | ✔ | ✔ |
| 3 | Janice Freeman | 32 | Compton, California | "Radioactive" | — | ✔ | ✔ | — |
| 4 | Xaris | 17 | Gulf Breeze, Florida | "Don't Think Twice, It's All Right" | — | — | — | — |
| 5 | Shi'Ann Jones | 15 | Bowling Green, Kentucky | "Drown in My Own Tears" | — | — | ✔ | ✔ |
| 6 | Dave Crosby | 30 | Seattle, Washington | "I Will Follow You into the Dark" | ✔ | ✔ | — | ✔ |
| 7 | Odiseas Georgiadis | 20 | Brooklyn, New York | "Papa's Got a Brand New Bag" | — | — | — | — |
| 8 | Esera Tuaolo | 49 | Minneapolis, Minnesota | "Rise Up" | — | — | ✔ | ✔ |
| 9 | Brandon Showell | 26 | Virginia Beach, Virginia | "There's Nothing Holdin' Me Back" | ✔ | ✔ | ✔ | — |
| 10 | Lucas Holliday | 26 | Lansing, Michigan | "This Woman's Work" | — | — | ✔ | — |
| 11 | Brooke Simpson | 26 | Hollister, North Carolina | "Stone Cold" | ✔ | ✔ | ✔ | ✔ |

=== Episode 2 (Sept. 26) ===
| Order | Artist | Age | Hometown | Song | Coach's and artist's choices | | | |
| Order | Artist | Age | Hometown | Song | Adam | Miley | Jennifer | Blake |
|---|---|---|---|---|---|---|---|---|
| 1 | Keisha Renee | 30 | Inglewood, California | "I Can't Stop Loving You" | ✔ | ✔ | ✔ | ✔ |
| 2 | Dylan Gerard | 28 | Macclenny, Florida | "Say You Won't Let Go" | ✔ | — | ✔ | — |
| 3 | Maharasyi | 27 | Indonesia / Los Angeles, California | "Tell Me Something Good" | — | ✔ | ✔ | — |
| 4 | Marlo Wells | 61 | Fontana, California | "Love Me Now" | — | — | — | — |
| 5 | Red Marlow | 40 | Dickson, Tennessee | "Swingin'" | — | ✔ | — | ✔ |
| 6 | Ashland Craft | 21 | Piedmont, South Carolina | "You Are My Sunshine" | ✔ | ✔ | — | ✔ |

=== Episode 3 (Oct. 2) ===
| Order | Artist | Age | Hometown | Song | Coach's and artist's choices | | | |
| Order | Artist | Age | Hometown | Song | Adam | Miley | Jennifer | Blake |
|---|---|---|---|---|---|---|---|---|
| 1 | Adam Cunningham | 38 | Nashville, Tennessee | "Midnight Rider" | — | — | ✔ | ✔ |
| 2 | Hannah Mrozak | 18 | Richfield, Wisconsin | "Starving" | ✔ | — | ✔ | ✔ |
| 3 | Shilo Gold | 26 | Denver, Colorado | "Stay with Me Baby" | — | ✔ | ✔ | — |
| 4 | Samantha Rios | 16 | Arlington, Virginia | "Something's Got a Hold on Me" | — | — | — | — |
| 5 | Noah Mac | 17 | Dublin, California | "Way Down We Go" | — | — | ✔ | ✔ |
| 6 | Davon Fleming | 25 | Baltimore, Maryland | "Me & Mr. Jones" | ✔ | ✔ | ✔ | ✔ |
| 7 | Kathrina Feigh | 24 | Quezon City, Philippines / New York City, New York | "Big White Room" | — | — | ✔ | ✔ |
| 8 | Alexandra Joyce | 16 | Wesley Chapel, Florida | "Wildest Dreams" | ✔ | — | ✔ | ✔ |
| 9 | Eric Lyn | 26 | Los Angeles, California | "O-o-h Child" | — | — | ✔ | — |
| 10 | Anna Catherine DeHart | 23 | Sikeston, Missouri | "I Could Use a Love Song" | ✔ | — | — | ✔ |
| 11 | Addison Agen | 16 | Fort Wayne, Indiana | "Jolene" | ✔ | ✔ | — | — |
| 12 | Adam Pearce | 31 | New Orleans, Louisiana | "Hot Blooded" | ✔ | ✔ | — | — |
| 13 | Myles Frost | 17 | Washington, D.C. | "My Cherie Amour" | — | — | — | — |
| 14 | Moriah Formica | 16 | Latham, New York | "Crazy on You" | ✔ | ✔ | ✔ | ✔ |

=== Episode 4 (Oct. 3) ===
| Order | Artist | Age | Hometown | Song | Coach's and artist's choices | | | |
| Order | Artist | Age | Hometown | Song | Adam | Miley | Jennifer | Blake |
|---|---|---|---|---|---|---|---|---|
| 1 | Anthony Alexander | 17 | Fontana, California | "Redbone" | ✔ | ✔ | ✔ | — |
| 2 | Sophia Bollman | 18 | Norco, California | "Invincible" | — | ✔ | — | ✔ |
| 3 | Jessica Rowboat | 28 | New Delhi, India / Queens, New York | "Imagine" | — | — | — | — |
| 4 | Karli Webster | 20 | Fort Worth, Texas | "You're So Vain" | ✔ | ✔ | — | — |
| 5 | Stephan Marcellus | 26 | Englewood, New Jersey | "Take Me to Church" | — | — | ✔ | — |
| 6 | Emily Luther | 24 | Woonsocket, Rhode Island | "Summertime" | ✔ | — | ✔ | ✔ |

=== Episode 5 (Oct. 9) ===
| Order | Artist | Age | Hometown | Song | Coach's and artist's choices | | | |
| Order | Artist | Age | Hometown | Song | Adam | Miley | Jennifer | Blake |
|---|---|---|---|---|---|---|---|---|
| 1 | Chloe Kohanski | 23 | Nashville, Tennessee | "The Chain" | — | ✔ | ✔ | ✔ |
| 2 | Olivia Kay | 13 | Edmond, Oklahoma | "Ghost" | — | — | — | — |
| 3 | Dennis Drummond | 27 | Nashville, Tennessee | "She Talks to Angels" | ✔ | — | — | ✔ |
| 4 | Ignatious Carmouche | 23 | Opelousas, Louisiana | "Latch" | — | — | ✔ | ✔ |
| 5 | Rebecca Brunner | 22 | Mason, Michigan | "Believer" | — | — | — | ✔ |
| 6 | Brandon Brown | 19 | The Bronx, New York | "Georgia on My Mind" | ✔ | — | ✔ | ✔ |
| 7 | Nathan Graham | 27 | Chicago, Illinois | "Nobody to Blame" | — | — | — | — |
| 8 | Whitney Fenimore | 28 | Tulsa, Oklahoma | "Hold On, We're Going Home" | ✔ | ✔ | — | — |
| 9 | Ilianna Viramontes | 18 | Brentwood, California | "New Soul" | — | ✔ | — | ✔ |
| 10 | Katrina Rose | 34 | Astoria, Queens, New York | "Kozmic Blues" | — | ✔ | — | — |
| 11 | Natalie Stovall | 35 | Nashville, Tennessee | "If It Hadn't Been For Love" | — | — | — | ✔ |
| 12 | Ryan Scripps | 24 | San Jose, California | "Body Like a Back Road" | — | — | — | ✔ |
| 13 | Meagan McNeal | 31 | Chicago, Illinois | "Can't Feel My Face" | — | — | ✔ | — |
| 14 | Jon Mero | 31 | Atlanta, Georgia | "Versace on the Floor" | ✔ | ✔ | ✔ | ✔ |

=== Episode 6 (Oct. 10) ===
| Order | Artist | Age | Hometown | Song | Coach's and artist's choices | | | |
| Order | Artist | Age | Hometown | Song | Adam | Miley | Jennifer | Blake |
|---|---|---|---|---|---|---|---|---|
| 1 | Kristi Hoopes | 19 | Parker, Colorado | "Heaven, Heartache and the Power of Love" | ✔ | — | ✔ | ✔ |
| 2 | Michael Kight | 25 | Dublin, Georgia | "Sugar" | ✔ | — | — | Team full |
| 3 | Jeremiah Miller | 18 | Fort Worth, Texas | "Slow Hands" | ✔ | — | ✔ | Team full |
| 4 | Serina Rae | 17 | Panama City Beach, Florida | "Stand By Me" | — | — | Team full | Team full |
| 5 | Austin Serrato | 42 | Ashville, Alabama | "Ain't No Sunshine" | — | — | Team full | Team full |
| 6 | Raycee Jones | 29 | Brooklyn, New York | "We Don't Have to Take Our Clothes Off" | — | — | Team full | Team full |
| 7 | Nik Singleton | 28 | Seattle, Washington | "Wide Open Spaces" | — | — | Team full | Team full |
| 8 | Megan Rose | 20 | San Francisco, California | "Ode to Billie Joe" | ✔ | ✔ | Team full | Team full |
| 9 | Gary Carpentier | 26 | Oswego, New York | "Home" | ✔ | Team full | Team full | Team full |

== The Battles ==
The Battle Rounds began on October 16. Season thirteen's advisors were Joe Jonas for Team Adam, Kelly Rowland for Team Jennifer, Billy Ray Cyrus for Team Miley, and Rascal Flatts for Team Blake. Like previous Battles, coaches can steal any two losing artists from another coach.

Color key:

| Artist won the Battle and advanced to the Knockouts |
| Artist lost the Battle but was stolen by another coach and advanced to the Knockouts |
| Artist lost the Battle and was originally eliminated but received the Coach Comeback and advanced to the Playoffs |
| Artist lost the Battle and was eliminated |

| Episode | Coach | Order | Winner | Song | Loser | 'Steal' result | | | |
| Episode | Coach | Order | Winner | Song | Loser | Adam | Miley | Jennifer | Blake |
|---|---|---|---|---|---|---|---|---|---|
| Episode 7 (Monday, Oct. 16, 2017) | Jennifer Hudson | 1 | Lucas Holliday | "My Prerogative" | Meagan McNeal | — | — | —N/a | — |
| Episode 7 (Monday, Oct. 16, 2017) | Miley Cyrus | 2 | Moriah Formica | "American Woman" | Shilo Gold | — | —N/a | — | — |
| Episode 7 (Monday, Oct. 16, 2017) | Blake Shelton | 3 | Keisha Renee | "I'm So Lonesome I Could Cry" | Noah Mac | — | — | ✔ | —N/a |
| Episode 7 (Monday, Oct. 16, 2017) | Jennifer Hudson | 4 | Chris Weaver | "Dangerous Woman" | Kathrina Feigh | — | — | —N/a | ✔ |
| Episode 7 (Monday, Oct. 16, 2017) | Miley Cyrus | 5 | Brooke Simpson | "You're a Big Girl Now" | Sophia Bollman | — | —N/a | — | — |
| Episode 7 (Monday, Oct. 16, 2017) | Adam Levine | 6 | Adam Pearce | "Stop Draggin' My Heart Around" | Whitney Fenimore | —N/a | ✔ | — | ✔ |
| Episode 8 (Tuesday, Oct. 17, 2017) | Jennifer Hudson | 1 | Davon Fleming | "I'm Your Baby Tonight" | Maharasyi | — | — | —N/a | — |
| Episode 8 (Tuesday, Oct. 17, 2017) | Adam Levine | 2 | Hannah Mrozak | "Cold Water" | Brandon Showell | —N/a | — | — | — |
| Episode 8 (Tuesday, Oct. 17, 2017) | Adam Levine | 3 | Dylan Gerard | "Doctor My Eyes" | Dave Crosby | —N/a | — | — | — |
| Episode 8 (Tuesday, Oct. 17, 2017) | Blake Shelton | 4 | Esera Tuaolo | "This I Promise You" | Rebecca Brunner | — | — | — | —N/a |
| Episode 8 (Tuesday, Oct. 17, 2017) | Miley Cyrus | 5 | Chloe Kohanski | "I Am Woman" | Ilianna Viramontes | — | —N/a | — | — |
| Episode 8 (Tuesday, Oct. 17, 2017) | Blake Shelton | 6 | Mitchell Lee | "Mr. Jones" | Dennis Drummond | ✔ | — | — | —N/a |
| Episode 9 (Monday, Oct. 23, 2017) | Adam Levine | 1 | Jon Mero | "I Wish It Would Rain" | Brandon Brown | —N/a | — | — | — |
| Episode 9 (Monday, Oct. 23, 2017) | Blake Shelton | 2 | Red Marlow | "Fishin' in the Dark" | Ryan Scripps | — | — | — | —N/a |
| Episode 9 (Monday, Oct. 23, 2017) | Miley Cyrus | 3 | Karli Webster | "Girls Just Want to Have Fun" | Addison Agen | ✔ | —N/a | ✔ | — |
| Episode 9 (Monday, Oct. 23, 2017) | Blake Shelton | 4 | Anna Catherine DeHart | "Independence Day" | Kristi Hoopes | Team full | — | — | —N/a |
| Episode 9 (Monday, Oct. 23, 2017) | Jennifer Hudson | 5 | Jeremiah Miller | "One Call Away" | Alexandra Joyce | Team full | — | —N/a | — |
| Episode 9 (Monday, Oct. 23, 2017) | Adam Levine | 6 | Emily Luther | "Send My Love (To Your New Lover)" | Gary Carpentier | Team full | — | — | — |
| Episode 9 (Monday, Oct. 23, 2017) | Jennifer Hudson | 7 | Shi'Ann Jones | "Oh! Darling" | Stephan Marcellus | Team full | ✔ | —N/a | — |
| Episode 9 (Monday, Oct. 23, 2017) | Adam Levine | 8 | Anthony Alexander | "I Feel It Coming" | Michael Kight | Team full | Team full | — | — |
| Episode 9 (Monday, Oct. 23, 2017) | Miley Cyrus | 9 | Janice Freeman | "W.O.M.A.N" | Katrina Rose | Team full | Team full | ✔ | — |
| Episode 10 (Tuesday, Oct. 24, 2017) | Blake Shelton | 1 | Adam Cunningham | "Boondocks" | Natalie Stovall | Team full | Team full | Team full | —N/a |
| Episode 10 (Tuesday, Oct. 24, 2017) | Jennifer Hudson | 2 | Eric Lyn | "Unaware" | Ignatious Carmouche | Team full | Team full | Team full | — |
| Episode 10 (Tuesday, Oct. 24, 2017) | Miley Cyrus | 3 | Ashland Craft | "A Good Hearted Woman" | Megan Rose | Team full | Team full | Team full | ✔ |

== The Knockouts ==
The Knockouts round starts with episode 11. The coaches can each steal one losing artist. The top 20 contestants then move on to The Playoffs. Kelly Clarkson served as the advisor for the Knockouts.

Color key:

| Artist won the Knockout and advanced to the Playoffs |
| Artist lost the Knockout but was stolen by another coach and advanced to the Playoffs |
| Artist lost the Knockout and was originally eliminated but received the Coach Comeback and advanced to the Playoffs |
| Artist lost the Knockout and was eliminated |

| Episode | Coach | Order | Song | Artists | | Song | 'Steal' result | | | |
| Episode | Coach | Order | Song | Winner | Loser | Song | Adam | Miley | Jennifer | Blake |
|---|---|---|---|---|---|---|---|---|---|---|
| Episode 11 (Monday, Oct. 30, 2017) | Blake Shelton | 1 | "Superstar" | Esera Tuaolo | Adam Cunningham | "Either Way" | ✔ | — | — | —N/a |
| Episode 11 (Monday, Oct. 30, 2017) | Jennifer Hudson | 2 | "Who's Lovin' You" | Shi'Ann Jones | Lucas Holliday | "Tell It Like It Is" | Team full | — | —N/a | — |
| Episode 11 (Monday, Oct. 30, 2017) | Adam Levine | 3 | "Beneath Your Beautiful" | Addison Agen | Dennis Drummond | "All Along the Watchtower" | Team full | — | — | — |
| Episode 11 (Monday, Oct. 30, 2017) | Miley Cyrus | 4 | "I'm Goin' Down" | Janice Freeman | Karli Webster | "Blue Bayou" | Team full | —N/a | — | — |
| Episode 11 (Monday, Oct. 30, 2017) | Jennifer Hudson | 5 | "I Can Only Imagine" | Davon Fleming | Eric Lyn | "What's Going On" | Team full | — | —N/a | — |
| Episode 11 (Monday, Oct. 30, 2017) | Miley Cyrus | 6 | "Wanted Dead or Alive" | Ashland Craft | Chloe Kohanski | "Landslide" | Team full | —N/a | ✔ | ✔ |
| Episode 12 (Tuesday, Oct. 31, 2017) (Halloween) | The twelfth episode was a special one-hour episode titled "Best of the Season". The episode showed selected moments of the season so far, including the coaches, their teams, their assistant team advisors, the journey of the contestants thus far, and some previously unseen footage. | | | | | | | | | |
| Episode 13 (Monday, Nov. 6, 2017) | Miley Cyrus | 1 | "(You Make Me Feel Like) A Natural Woman" | Brooke Simpson | Stephan Marcellus | "Impossible" | Team full | —N/a | — | Team full |
| Episode 13 (Monday, Nov. 6, 2017) | Blake Shelton | 2 | "I'll Be" | Mitchell Lee | Anna Catherine DeHart | "Breathe" | Team full | — | — | Team full |
| Episode 13 (Monday, Nov. 6, 2017) | Jennifer Hudson | 3 | "Hold Back the River" | Noah Mac | Jeremiah Miller | "Sorry" | Team full | — | —N/a | Team full |
| Episode 13 (Monday, Nov. 6, 2017) | Blake Shelton | 4 | "I Hope You Dance" | Keisha Renee | Kathrina Feigh | "Girl on Fire" | Team full | — | — | Team full |
| Episode 13 (Monday, Nov. 6, 2017) | Adam Levine | 5 | "Blame It On the Boogie" | Jon Mero | Dylan Gerard | "All of the Stars" | Team full | — | — | Team full |
| Episode 13 (Monday, Nov. 6, 2017) | Miley Cyrus | 6 | "Behind These Hazel Eyes" | Moriah Formica | Whitney Fenimore^{1} | "Calling All Angels" | Team full | —N/a | — | Team full |
| Episode 13 (Monday, Nov. 6, 2017) | Adam Levine | 7 | "Glitter in the Air" | Emily Luther | Adam Pearce | "Smoke on the Water" | Team full | ✔ | — | Team full |
| Episode 14 (Tuesday, Nov. 7, 2017) (Election) | Jennifer Hudson | 1 | "I Put a Spell on You" | Chris Weaver | Katrina Rose | "Zombie" | Team full | Team full | —N/a | Team full |
| Episode 14 (Tuesday, Nov. 7, 2017) (Election) | Blake Shelton | 2 | "Outskirts of Heaven" | Red Marlow | Megan Rose | "Smoke Break" | Team full | Team full | — | Team full |
| Episode 14 (Tuesday, Nov. 7, 2017) (Election) | Adam Levine | 3 | "Mercy" | Anthony Alexander | Hannah Mrozak | "Love on the Brain" | Team full | Team full | ✔ | Team full |

^{1} Whitney Fenimore is on Team Adam for the Playoffs.

== The Playoffs ==
The Playoffs were taped on August 31 and September 1, and comprised episodes 15, 16, and 17. As in season six and for the first time since then, the Playoffs were prerecorded and hence no interactive viewer voting component or subsequent results shows. As in seasons 9, 10, and 12, four previously eliminated artists were chosen by the coaches to come back for the Playoffs.

This season is the first to have the Playoffs taped on the same stage as the Battles and the Knockouts. There was no public vote in the playoffs. Instead, each of the coaches selected three of their own artists to eliminate.

Color key:

| Artist was chosen by his/her coach to move on to the live shows |
| Artist was eliminated |

| Episode | Coach | Order | Artist | Song | Result |
|---|---|---|---|---|---|
| Episode 15 (Monday, Nov. 13, 2017) | Jennifer Hudson | 1 | Davon Fleming | "I Am Changing" | Advanced |
| Episode 15 (Monday, Nov. 13, 2017) | Jennifer Hudson | 2 | Hannah Mrozak | "Learn to Let Go" | Eliminated |
| Episode 15 (Monday, Nov. 13, 2017) | Jennifer Hudson | 3 | Lucas Holliday | "The Beautiful Ones" | Eliminated |
| Episode 15 (Monday, Nov. 13, 2017) | Jennifer Hudson | 4 | Shi'Ann Jones | "Tattooed Heart" | Advanced |
| Episode 15 (Monday, Nov. 13, 2017) | Jennifer Hudson | 5 | Chris Weaver | "California Soul" | Eliminated |
| Episode 15 (Monday, Nov. 13, 2017) | Jennifer Hudson | 6 | Noah Mac | "In the Air Tonight" | Advanced |
| Episode 15 (Monday, Nov. 13, 2017) | Blake Shelton | 7 | Red Marlow | "Chiseled in Stone" | Advanced |
| Episode 15 (Monday, Nov. 13, 2017) | Blake Shelton | 8 | Chloe Kohanski | "Time After Time" | Advanced |
| Episode 15 (Monday, Nov. 13, 2017) | Blake Shelton | 9 | Natalie Stovall | "Callin' Baton Rouge" | Eliminated |
| Episode 15 (Monday, Nov. 13, 2017) | Blake Shelton | 10 | Esera Tuaolo | "How Do I Live" | Eliminated |
| Episode 15 (Monday, Nov. 13, 2017) | Blake Shelton | 11 | Mitchell Lee | "Heaven" | Eliminated |
| Episode 15 (Monday, Nov. 13, 2017) | Blake Shelton | 12 | Keisha Renee | "Love Can Build a Bridge" | Advanced |
| Episode 16 (Tuesday, Nov. 14, 2017) | Adam Levine | 1 | Adam Cunningham | "Have a Little Faith in Me" | Advanced |
| Episode 16 (Tuesday, Nov. 14, 2017) | Adam Levine | 2 | Whitney Fenimore | "If It Makes You Happy" | Eliminated |
| Episode 16 (Tuesday, Nov. 14, 2017) | Adam Levine | 3 | Emily Luther | "Lovesong" | Eliminated |
| Episode 16 (Tuesday, Nov. 14, 2017) | Adam Levine | 4 | Anthony Alexander | "Perfect" | Eliminated |
| Episode 16 (Tuesday, Nov. 14, 2017) | Adam Levine | 5 | Jon Mero | "When We Were Young" | Advanced |
| Episode 16 (Tuesday, Nov. 14, 2017) | Adam Levine | 6 | Addison Agen | "Angel from Montgomery" | Advanced |
| Episode 17 (Wednesday, Nov. 15, 2017) | Miley Cyrus | 1 | Brooke Simpson | "It's a Man's Man's Man's World" | Advanced |
| Episode 17 (Wednesday, Nov. 15, 2017) | Miley Cyrus | 2 | Karli Webster | "Coat of Many Colors" | Eliminated |
| Episode 17 (Wednesday, Nov. 15, 2017) | Miley Cyrus | 3 | Adam Pearce | "Love Hurts" | Eliminated |
| Episode 17 (Wednesday, Nov. 15, 2017) | Miley Cyrus | 4 | Ashland Craft | "When I Think About Cheatin'" | Advanced |
| Episode 17 (Wednesday, Nov. 15, 2017) | Miley Cyrus | 5 | Moriah Formica | "World Without You" | Eliminated |
| Episode 17 (Wednesday, Nov. 15, 2017) | Miley Cyrus | 6 | Janice Freeman | "Fall for You" | Advanced |

== Live shows ==
Color key:

| Artist was saved by the Public's votes |
| Artist was placed in the bottom two, bottom three, or middle three |
| Artist was saved by the Instant Save |
| Artist's iTunes vote multiplied by 5 (except The Finals) after his/her studio version of the song reached iTunes top 10 |
| Artist was eliminated |

=== Week 1: Top 12 (Nov. 20 & 21) ===
The Top 12 performed on Monday, November 20, 2017, with the results following on Tuesday, November 21, 2017. The Instant Save returned once again this season, with the bottom two artists performing for a spot in the next round via the viewers' votes from Twitter.

iTunes bonuses this week was awarded to Addison Agen (#9).

In addition, the show's official YouTube channel released a video starring the cast of Pitch Perfect 3 and the Top 12 singing "Freedom! '90" and "Cups".

| Episode | Coach | Order | Artist | Song | Result |
|---|---|---|---|---|---|
| Episode 18 (Monday, Nov. 20, 2017) | Miley Cyrus | 1 | Brooke Simpson | "Praying" | Public's vote |
| Episode 18 (Monday, Nov. 20, 2017) | Blake Shelton | 2 | Red Marlow | "The Church on Cumberland Road" | Public's vote |
| Episode 18 (Monday, Nov. 20, 2017) | Jennifer Hudson | 3 | Shi'Ann Jones | "Vision of Love" | Public's vote |
| Episode 18 (Monday, Nov. 20, 2017) | Adam Levine | 4 | Jon Mero | "Why I Love You" | Bottom two |
| Episode 18 (Monday, Nov. 20, 2017) | Miley Cyrus | 5 | Ashland Craft | "Delta Dawn" | Public's vote |
| Episode 18 (Monday, Nov. 20, 2017) | Adam Levine | 6 | Adam Cunningham | "Against All Odds (Take a Look at Me Now)" | Bottom two |
| Episode 18 (Monday, Nov. 20, 2017) | Blake Shelton | 7 | Chloe Kohanski | "Thank You" | Public's vote |
| Episode 18 (Monday, Nov. 20, 2017) | Jennifer Hudson | 8 | Davon Fleming | "Love On Top" | Public's vote |
| Episode 18 (Monday, Nov. 20, 2017) | Adam Levine | 9 | Addison Agen | "She Used to Be Mine" | Public's vote |
| Episode 18 (Monday, Nov. 20, 2017) | Blake Shelton | 10 | Keisha Renee | "Midnight Train to Georgia" | Public's vote |
| Episode 18 (Monday, Nov. 20, 2017) | Jennifer Hudson | 11 | Noah Mac | "Speed of Sound" | Public's vote |
| Episode 18 (Monday, Nov. 20, 2017) | Miley Cyrus | 12 | Janice Freeman | "The Story" | Public's vote |
Instant Save Performances
| Episode 19 (Tuesday, Nov. 21, 2017) | Adam Levine | 1 | Adam Cunningham | "Fortunate Son" | Instant Save |
| Episode 19 (Tuesday, Nov. 21, 2017) | Adam Levine | 2 | Jon Mero | "I Want You Back" | Eliminated |

Non-competition performances
| Order | Performer | Song |
|---|---|---|
| 19.1 | Jennifer Hudson and her team (Davon Fleming, Noah Mac and Shi'Ann Jones) | "Let It Be" |
| 19.2 | Maroon 5 | "What Lovers Do" |
| 19.3 | Blake Shelton and his team (Chloe Kohanski, Keisha Renee and Red Marlow) | "If It Will, It Will" |

=== Week 2: Top 11 (Nov. 27 & 28) ===
The Top 11 performed songs chosen by the public on Monday, November 27, 2017, with the results following on Tuesday, November 28, 2017. iTunes bonus multipliers were awarded to Red Marlow (#9), Agen (#2), and Chloe Kohanski (#1).

| Episode | Coach | Order | Artist | Song | Results |
|---|---|---|---|---|---|
| Episode 20 (Monday, Nov. 27, 2017) | Miley Cyrus | 1 | Janice Freeman | "Shine" | Bottom two |
| Episode 20 (Monday, Nov. 27, 2017) | Blake Shelton | 2 | Red Marlow | "The Dance" | Public's vote |
| Episode 20 (Monday, Nov. 27, 2017) | Jennifer Hudson | 3 | Shi’Ann Jones | "Listen" | Public's vote |
| Episode 20 (Monday, Nov. 27, 2017) | Adam Levine | 4 | Adam Cunningham | "American Girl" | Bottom two |
| Episode 20 (Monday, Nov. 27, 2017) | Miley Cyrus | 5 | Brooke Simpson | "What About Us" | Public's vote |
| Episode 20 (Monday, Nov. 27, 2017) | Jennifer Hudson | 6 | Davon Fleming | "I Have Nothing" | Public's vote |
| Episode 20 (Monday, Nov. 27, 2017) | Miley Cyrus | 7 | Ashland Craft | "Chicken Fried" | Public's vote |
| Episode 20 (Monday, Nov. 27, 2017) | Adam Levine | 8 | Addison Agen | "A Case of You" | Public's vote |
| Episode 20 (Monday, Nov. 27, 2017) | Blake Shelton | 9 | Keisha Renee | "It Matters to Me" | Public's vote |
| Episode 20 (Monday, Nov. 27, 2017) | Jennifer Hudson | 10 | Noah Mac | "Electric Love" | Public's vote |
| Episode 20 (Monday, Nov. 27, 2017) | Blake Shelton | 11 | Chloe Kohanski | "Total Eclipse of the Heart" | Public's vote |
Instant Save Performances
| Episode 21 (Tuesday, Nov. 28, 2017) | Adam Levine | 1 | Adam Cunningham | "Amazed" | Instant Save |
| Episode 21 (Tuesday, Nov. 28, 2017) | Miley Cyrus | 2 | Janice Freeman | "Chandelier" | Eliminated |

Non-competition performances
| Order | Performer | Song |
|---|---|---|
| 21.1 | Miley Cyrus and her team (Ashland Craft, Janice Freeman and Brooke Simpson) | "Man! I Feel Like a Woman!" |
| 21.2 | Adam Levine and his team (Addison Agen and Adam Cunningham) | "Go Your Own Way" |
| 21.3 | Blake Shelton with Jennifer Hudson | "I'll Name the Dogs" |

=== Week 3: Top 10 (Dec. 4 & 5) ===
The Top 10 performed on Monday, December 4, 2017, with the results following on Tuesday, December 5, 2017. iTunes bonus multipliers were awarded to Keisha Renee (#10), Agen (#5), Kohanski (#4), and Brooke Simpson (#2).

| Episode | Coach | Order | Artist | Song | Results |
|---|---|---|---|---|---|
| Episode 22 (Monday, Dec. 4, 2017) | Jennifer Hudson | 1 | Davon Fleming | "Hurt" | Bottom three |
| Episode 22 (Monday, Dec. 4, 2017) | Adam Levine | 2 | Adam Cunningham | "Maybe It Was Memphis" | Public's vote |
| Episode 22 (Monday, Dec. 4, 2017) | Jennifer Hudson | 3 | Noah Mac | "Ordinary World" | Public's vote |
| Episode 22 (Monday, Dec. 4, 2017) | Jennifer Hudson | 4 | Shi'Ann Jones | "Diamonds" | Bottom three |
| Episode 22 (Monday, Dec. 4, 2017) | Blake Shelton | 5 | Chloe Kohanski | "Call Me" | Public's vote |
| Episode 22 (Monday, Dec. 4, 2017) | Blake Shelton | 6 | Keisha Renee | "All By Myself" | Public's vote |
| Episode 22 (Monday, Dec. 4, 2017) | Miley Cyrus | 7 | Ashland Craft | "I Hate Myself for Loving You" | Bottom three |
| Episode 22 (Monday, Dec. 4, 2017) | Miley Cyrus | 8 | Brooke Simpson | "Amazing Grace" | Public's vote |
| Episode 22 (Monday, Dec. 4, 2017) | Blake Shelton | 9 | Red Marlow | "That's What I Love About Sunday" | Public's vote |
| Episode 22 (Monday, Dec. 4, 2017) | Adam Levine | 10 | Addison Agen | "Lucky" | Public's vote |
Instant Save Performances
| Episode 23 (Tuesday, Dec. 5, 2017) | Miley Cyrus | 1 | Ashland Craft | "Tonight I Wanna Cry" | Eliminated |
| Episode 23 (Tuesday, Dec. 5, 2017) | Jennifer Hudson | 2 | Shi'Ann Jones | "At Last" | Eliminated |
| Episode 23 (Tuesday, Dec. 5, 2017) | Jennifer Hudson | 3 | Davon Fleming | "Ain't No Way" | Instant Save |

Non-competition performances
| Order | Performer | Song |
|---|---|---|
| 22.1 | Gwen Stefani feat. Blake Shelton | "You Make It Feel Like Christmas" |
| 23.1 | Portugal. The Man | "Feel It Still" |
| 23.2 | Danielle Bradbery | "Worth It" |

=== Week 4: Semifinals (Dec. 11 & 12) ===
The Top 8 performed on Monday, December 11, 2017, with the results following on Tuesday, December 12, 2017. Like Season 12, the duets between contestants were part of the competition and public voting. In the semifinals, three artists will automatically move to next week's finale, the two artists with the fewest votes will be immediately eliminated and the middle three will contend for the remaining spot in the next week's finals via the Instant Save. iTunes bonuses this week awarded to Kohanski (#1), Agen (#2), Red Marlow (#5), Brooke Simpson (#6) and Noah Mac (#7), as well as the duet for Kohanski and Mac (#3). Davon Fleming's "Gravity" was in the Top 10 earlier Tuesday, but it had fallen to #11 by the voting deadline.

With the eliminations of Mac and Davon Fleming, with the former being the first artist to receive two iTunes bonuses and to be eliminated during the same week, Hudson no longer has any artists remaining on her team.

| Episode | Coach | Order | Artist | Solo Song | Duet Song | Results |
|---|---|---|---|---|---|---|
| Episode 24 (Monday, Dec. 11, 2017) | Adam Levine | 1 (7) | Adam Cunningham | "I'm Already There" | "Can't You See" | Middle three |
| Episode 24 (Monday, Dec. 11, 2017) | Jennifer Hudson | 3 (5) | Davon Fleming | "Gravity" | "Earned It" | Eliminated |
| Episode 24 (Monday, Dec. 11, 2017) | Blake Shelton | 4 (7) | Red Marlow | "Go Rest High on That Mountain" | "Can't You See" | Middle three |
| Episode 24 (Monday, Dec. 11, 2017) | Blake Shelton | 6 (9) | Keisha Renee | "What Hurts the Most" | "Strong Enough" | Eliminated |
| Episode 24 (Monday, Dec. 11, 2017) | Blake Shelton | 8 (2) | Chloe Kohanski | "I Want To Know What Love Is" | "Wicked Game" | Public's vote |
| Episode 24 (Monday, Dec. 11, 2017) | Jennifer Hudson | 10 (2) | Noah Mac | "River" | "Wicked Game" | Middle three |
| Episode 24 (Monday, Dec. 11, 2017) | Adam Levine | 11 (9) | Addison Agen | "Both Sides, Now" | "Strong Enough" | Public's vote |
| Episode 24 (Monday, Dec. 11, 2017) | Miley Cyrus | 12 (5) | Brooke Simpson | "Faithfully" | "Earned It" | Public's vote |
Instant Save Performances
| Episode 25 (Tuesday, December 12, 2017) | Blake Shelton | 1 | Red Marlow | "Dixieland Delight" | | Instant Save |
| Episode 25 (Tuesday, December 12, 2017) | Adam Levine | 2 | Adam Cunningham | "Here's a Quarter (Call Someone Who Cares)" | | Eliminated |
| Episode 25 (Tuesday, December 12, 2017) | Jennifer Hudson | 3 | Noah Mac | "Sign of the Times" | | Eliminated |

Non-competition performances
| Order | Performer | Song |
|---|---|---|
| 25.1 | Machine Gun Kelly, X Ambassadors and Bebe Rexha | "Home" |
| 25.2 | Jennifer Hudson | "Burden Down" |
| 25.3 | Alisan Porter, Chris Mann, Mary Sarah, Matt McAndrew, Matthew Schuler, and Michael Sanchez (giving a preview of the upcoming The Voice: Neon Dreams residency show in Las Vegas) | "It's Time" |

=== Week 5: Finale (Dec. 18 & 19) ===
The Top 4 performed on Monday, December 18, 2017, with the final results following on Tuesday, December 19, 2017. This week, the four finalists performed a solo cover song, a duet with their coach, and an original song. iTunes bonuses this week were awarded to Agen (#1 and #5), Kohanski (#2 and #7), Marlow (#3 and #10) and Simpson (#4 and #8). For the first time in The Voice history, the Top three (of the final four) artists were all female. All finalists in the Top 3 were originally members of Team Miley and this was the first season in which both of the top 2 artists were stolen artists.

With Kohanski's victory, she became the third stolen artist to win The Voice, with Josh Kaufman from the 6th season being the first and Craig Wayne Boyd from the 7th season being the second. She also became the first female stolen artist to win an entire The Voice season.

| Coach | Artist | Order | Solo Song | Order | Duet Song (with Coach) | Order | Original Song | Result |
|---|---|---|---|---|---|---|---|---|
| Adam Levine | Addison Agen | 1 | "Humble and Kind" | 5 | "Falling Slowly" | 11 | "Tennessee Rain" | Runner-up |
| Blake Shelton | Chloe Kohanski | 12 | "Bette Davis Eyes" | 8 | "You Got It" | 2 | "Wish I Didn't Love You" | Winner |
| Blake Shelton | Red Marlow | 9 | "Make You Feel My Love" | 3 | "I'm Gonna Miss Her" | 7 | "I Pray" | Fourth place |
| Miley Cyrus | Brooke Simpson | 10 | "O Holy Night" | 6 | "Wrecking Ball" | 4 | "What Is Beautiful" | Third place |

Non-competition performances
| Order | Performer | Song |
|---|---|---|
| 26.1 | Chris Blue | "Humanity" (In promotion of NBC's Winter Olympics coverage) |
| 27.1 | Bebe Rexha, Adam Cunningham and Keisha Renee | "Meant to Be" |
| 27.2 | Charlie Puth (with Adam Levine on guitar) | "How Long" |
| 27.3 | Norah Jones and Addison Agen | "Don't Know Why" |
| 27.4 | Bastille and Noah Mac | "World Gone Mad" |
| 27.5 | Kelly Clarkson | "Medicine" |
| 27.6 | Chris Blue | "Blue Blood Blues" |
| 27.7 | Sia and Brooke Simpson | "Titanium" |
| 27.8 | Chris Weaver as Nedra Belle and Stephanie's Child featuring Jessie J | "Bang Bang" |
| 27.9 | Billy Idol and Chloe Kohanski | "White Wedding" |
| 27.10 | Demi Lovato | "Tell Me You Love Me" |
| 27.11 | Jessie J and Davon Fleming | "Not My Ex" |
| 27.12 | Vince Gill and Red Marlow | "When I Call Your Name" |
| 27.13 | N.E.R.D. | "Lemon" |
| 27.14 | Sia | "Snowman" |

== Elimination chart ==
=== Overall ===
Color key
Artist's info

- Team Adam
- Team Miley
- Team JHud
- Team Blake

Result details

- Winner
- Runner-up
- Third place
- Fourth place
- Saved by Instant Save (via Twitter)
- Saved by the public
- Eliminated

Results per week
| Artist | Week 1 | Week 2 | Week 3 | Week 4 | Week 5 Finale |
|---|---|---|---|---|---|
| Chloe Kohanski | Safe | Safe | Safe | Safe | Winner |
| Addison Agen | Safe | Safe | Safe | Safe | Runner-up |
| Brooke Simpson | Safe | Safe | Safe | Safe | 3rd place |
| Red Marlow | Safe | Safe | Safe | Safe | 4th place |
| Noah Mac | Safe | Safe | Safe | Eliminated | Eliminated (Week 4) |
| Adam Cunningham | Safe | Safe | Safe | Eliminated | Eliminated (Week 4) |
| Keisha Renee | Safe | Safe | Safe | Eliminated | Eliminated (Week 4) |
| Davon Fleming | Safe | Safe | Safe | Eliminated | Eliminated (Week 4) |
| Ashland Craft | Safe | Safe | Eliminated | Eliminated (Week 3) | |
| Shi'Ann Jones | Safe | Safe | Eliminated | Eliminated (Week 3) | |
| Janice Freeman | Safe | Eliminated | Eliminated (Week 2) | | |
| Jon Mero | Eliminated | Eliminated (Week 1) | | | |

=== Team ===
Color key
Artist's info

- Team Adam
- Team Miley
- Team JHud
- Team Blake

Result details

- Winner
- Runner-up
- Third place
- Fourth place
- Eliminated
- Artist Saved by Instant Save (via Twitter)
- Artist advanced and received one or more iTunes bonus that week
- Number of iTunes bonuses received
- Teams are in 3 artists
- No artists remaining on his/her team

| Artist | Week 1 | Week 2 | Week 3 | Week 4 | Week 5 Finale |
|---|---|---|---|---|---|
| Addison Agen | Advanced | Advanced | Advanced | Advanced | Runner-up |
| Adam Cunningham | Advanced | Advanced | Advanced | Eliminated | |
| Jon Mero | Eliminated | | | | |
| Brooke Simpson | Advanced | Advanced | Advanced | Advanced | Third Place |
| Ashland Craft | Advanced | Advanced | Eliminated | | |
| Janice Freeman | Advanced | Eliminated | | | |
| Noah Mac | Advanced | Advanced | Advanced | Eliminated | |
| Davon Fleming | Advanced | Advanced | Advanced | Eliminated | |
| Shi'Ann Jones | Advanced | Advanced | Eliminated | | |
| Chloe Kohanski | Advanced | Advanced | Advanced | Advanced | Winner |
| Red Marlow | Advanced | Advanced | Advanced | Advanced | Fourth Place |
| Keisha Renee | Advanced | Advanced | Advanced | Eliminated | |

| Rank | Coach | Top 12 | Top 11 | Top 10 | Top 8 | Top 6 | Top 4 |
|---|---|---|---|---|---|---|---|
| 1 | Blake Shelton | 3 | 3 | 3 | 3 | 2 | 2 |
| 2 | Adam Levine | 3 | 2 | 2 | 2 | 2 | 1 |
| 3 | Miley Cyrus | 3 | 3 | 2 | 1 | 1 | 1 |
| 4 | Jennifer Hudson | 3 | 3 | 3 | 2 | 1 | 0 |

== Reception ==
=== U.S. Nielsen ratings ===
| Episode | | Original airdate | Production | Time slot (ET) | Viewers (in millions) | Adults (18–49) | | Source |
| Episode | | Original airdate | Production | Time slot (ET) | Viewers (in millions) | Rating | Share | Source |
|---|---|---|---|---|---|---|---|---|
| 1 | "The Blind Auditions Premiere, Part 1" | September 25, 2017 | 1301 | Monday 8:00 p.m. | 10.57 | 2.6 | 9 | |
| 2 | "The Blind Auditions Premiere, Part 2" | September 26, 2017 | 1302 | Tuesday 8:00 p.m. | 10.98 | 2.7 | 10 | |
| 3 | "The Blind Auditions, Part 3" | October 2, 2017 | 1303 | Monday 8:00 p.m. | 11.04 | 2.6 | 9 | |
| 4 | "The Blind Auditions, Part 4" | October 3, 2017 | 1304 | Tuesday 8:00 p.m. | 10.42 | 2.4 | 9 | |
| 5 | "The Blind Auditions, Part 5" | October 9, 2017 | 1305 | Monday 8:00 p.m. | 10.91 | 2.4 | 8 | |
| 6 | "The Blind Auditions, Part 6" | October 10, 2017 | 1306 | Tuesday 8:00 p.m. | 10.93 | 2.6 | 9 | |
| 7 | "The Battles Premiere, Part 1" | October 16, 2017 | 1307 | Monday 8:00 p.m. | 11.01 | 2.6 | 10 | |
| 8 | "The Battles Premiere, Part 2" | October 17, 2017 | 1308 | Tuesday 8:00 p.m. | 10.41 | 2.4 | 8 | |
| 9 | "The Battles, Part 3" | October 23, 2017 | 1309 | Monday 8:00 p.m. | 10.19 | 2.4 | 8 | |
| 10 | "The Battles, Part 4" | October 24, 2017 | 1310 | Tuesday 8:00 p.m. | 9.90 | 1.9 | 7 | |
| 11 | "The Knockouts Premiere, Part 1" | October 30, 2017 | 1311 | Monday 8:00 p.m. | 9.98 | 1.9 | 7 | |
| 12 | "The Voice: Best of the Season" | October 31, 2017 | 1312 | Tuesday 8:00 p.m. | 6.23 | 1.0 | 4 | |
| 13 | "The Knockouts, Part 2" | November 6, 2017 | 1313 | Monday 8:00 p.m. | 9.63 | 2.0 | 7 | |
| 14 | "The Knockouts, Part 3" | November 7, 2017 | 1314 | Tuesday 8:00 p.m. | 9.47 | 1.9 | 7 | |
| 15 | "The Playoffs, Night 1" | November 13, 2017 | 1315 | Monday 8:00 p.m. | 10.01 | 2.0 | 8 | |
| 16 | "The Playoffs, Night 2" | November 14, 2017 | 1316 | Tuesday 8:00 p.m. | 10.08 | 2.1 | 8 | |
| 17 | "The Playoffs, Night 3" | November 15, 2017 | 1317 | Wednesday 9:00 p.m. | 8.23 | 1.7 | 7 | |
| 18 | "Live Top 12 Performance" | November 20, 2017 | 1318 | Monday 8:00 p.m. | 9.15 | 1.7 | 6 | |
| 19 | "Live Top 12 Results" | November 21, 2017 | 1319 | Tuesday 8:00 p.m. | 9.36 | 1.7 | 7 | |
| 20 | "Live Top 11 Performance" | November 27, 2017 | 1320 | Monday 8:00 p.m. | 9.60 | 1.9 | 7 | |
| 21 | "Live Top 11 Results" | November 28, 2017 | 1321 | Tuesday 8:00 p.m. | 10.60 | 1.8 | 7 | |
| 22 | "Live Top 10 Performance" | December 4, 2017 | 1322 | Monday 8:00 p.m. | 9.86 | 1.8 | 7 | |
| 23 | "Live Top 10 Results" | December 5, 2017 | 1323 | Tuesday 8:00 p.m. | 10.00 | 1.8 | 7 | |
| 24 | "Live Top 8 Semifinals Performance" | December 11, 2017 | 1324 | Monday 8:00 p.m. | 10.45 | 1.9 | 7 | |
| 25 | "Live Top 8 Semifinals Results" | December 12, 2017 | 1325 | Tuesday 8:00 p.m. | 9.77 | 1.7 | 7 | |
| 26 | "Live Finale Performance" | December 18, 2017 | 1326 | Monday 8:00 p.m. | 11.02 | 2.0 | 7 | |
| 27 | "Live Finale Results" | December 19, 2017 | 1327 | Tuesday 9:00 p.m. | 10.91 | 2.0 | 8 | |
