= Chloe Kohanski =

American rock singer-songwriter (born 1993)

- Also known as: sweet93; chloe mk
- Born: December 29, 1993 (age 32); Nashville, Tennessee, U.S.
- Genres: Rock; pop rock; new wave
- Occupation: Singer-songwriter
- Instrument: Vocals
- Years active: 2016–present
- Labels: Republic Records; special baby records

Chloe Kohanski (born December 29, 1993), known professionally as sweet93 and formerly as chloe mk, is an American rock singer-songwriter. She is the winner of season 13 of the American talent competition The Voice at the age of 23. She competed on the team coached by Blake Shelton, giving him his 6th win as a coach on the show. She is the first female stolen artist to win the show, followed by two males Josh Kaufman and Craig Wayne Boyd.

== Career ==
=== The Voice (2017) ===
Kohanski auditioned in 2017 to compete in the 13th season of The Voice. In the blind auditions, broadcast on October 9, 2017, on NBC, she sang "The Chain" from Fleetwood Mac. Three of the four judges—Miley Cyrus, Jennifer Hudson, and Blake Shelton—turned their chairs with only Adam Levine refraining. She chose to be part of Team Miley. In the knockouts stage, broadcast on October 30, 2017, she was eliminated by Miley Cyrus, who opted to keep Ashland Craft instead. Both Blake Shelton and Jennifer Hudson wanted to steal the eliminated Kohanski, and she chose to continue as part of Team Blake. On December 19, 2017, Kohanski won the season title with "Wish I Didn't Love You". This marked the sixth victory for coach Blake Shelton which added to his record as the mentor with the most wins on the show. Kohanski won the $100,000 grand prize and a record deal with Universal Music Group. She said that she will continue her efforts to bring rock and roll and classic rock into pop culture.

The Voice performances

– Studio version of performance reached the top 10 on iTunes

Stage	Song	Original artist	Date	Order	Result
Blind Audition	"The Chain"	Fleetwood Mac	Oct. 9, 2017	5.1	Miley Cyrus, Jennifer Hudson and Blake Shelton Turned, Joined Team Miley
Battles (Top 48)	"I Am Woman" (vs. Ilianna Viramontes)	Helen Reddy	Oct. 17, 2017	8.5	Saved by Miley
Knockouts (Top 32)	"Landslide" (vs. Ashland Craft)	Fleetwood Mac	Oct. 30, 2017	11.6	Defeated, stolen by Jennifer Hudson and Blake Shelton, joined Team Blake
Playoffs (Top 24)	"Time After Time"	Cyndi Lauper	Nov. 13, 2017	15.8	Saved by Blake
Live Top 12	"Thank You"	Dido	Nov. 20, 2017	18.7	Saved by public
Live Top 11	"Total Eclipse of the Heart"	Bonnie Tyler	Nov. 27, 2017	20.11	Saved by public
Live Top 10	"Call Me"	Blondie	Dec. 4, 2017	22.5	Saved by public
Live Semifinals (Top 8)	"Wicked Game" (duet with Noah Mac)	Chris Isaak	Dec. 11, 2017	24.2	Saved by public
Live Semifinals (Top 8)	"I Want to Know What Love Is"	Foreigner	Dec. 11, 2017	24.5	Saved by public
Live Finale (Final 4)	"You Got It" (with Blake Shelton)	Roy Orbison	Dec. 18, 2017	26.8	Winner
Live Finale (Final 4)	"Wish I Didn't Love You" (original song)	Chloe Kohanski	Dec. 18, 2017	26.2	Winner
Live Finale (Final 4)	"Bette Davis Eyes"	Kim Carnes	Dec. 18, 2017	26.12	Winner

Non-competition performances
Collaborator(s)	Song	Original artist
Blake Shelton, Red Marlow, and Keisha Renee	"If It Will, It Will"	Hank Williams Jr.
Billy Idol	"White Wedding"	Billy Idol

=== Record deal and name change (2018-present) ===
Following the end of The Voice season 13, Kohanski was signed to Republic Records. On May 22, 2018, she released her debut single "Come This Far". On the season 14 finale, she performed her new single which was her first TV performance after winning the competition.

In 2019, Kohanski changed her stage name to chloe mk. On May 24, 2019, she released her first single under her new name titled "To Be Young". She later announced that she would be releasing her first extended play titled "Fantasy" which was released on July 19.

On June 16, 2019, Chloe started her tour with Sizzy Rocket. She performed in Chicago, Illinois, and her further tour dates included Cleveland, Ohio, on June 17, Nashville, Tennessee, on June 18, Indianapolis, Indiana, on June 19, Pittsburgh, Pennsylvania, on June 20, Washington, D.C., on June 21, and New York, New York, on June 23.

In 2023, she returned to The Voice for the 23rd season to perform in the finale with CeeLo Green and other former Team Blake members, as this was Blake Shelton's last episode on the show.

== Discography ==
=== Studio albums ===
Title	Studio album details
All the Same All Ok	Released: November 19, 2021; Label: special baby records; Format: Digital download, streaming

=== Compilation albums ===
Title	Compilation album details
Chloe Kohanski: The Complete Season 13 Collection	Released: December 19, 2017; Label: Republic; Format: Digital download, streaming

=== Extended plays ===
Title	Extended play details
Fantasy	Released: July 19, 2019; Label: Republic; Format: Digital download, streaming

=== Singles ===
Single	Year	Peak chart positions	Album
Single	Year	US	Album
"Wish I Didn't Love You"	2017	69	Chloe Kohanski: The Complete Season 13 Collection
"Come This Far"	2018	—	Non-album single
"To Be Young"	2019	—	Fantasy
"Cosmic"	2020	—	Non-album single
"Slide"	2021	—	All the Same All Ok
"Wonder"	2021	—	All the Same All Ok
"Strawberry Fields Forever"	2023	—	Non-album single
"Stars Above"	2023	—	Non-album single
"Be My Best"	2023	—	Non-album single
"what's true?"	2024	—	Non-album single
"i wanna"	2025	—	Non-album single

Awards and achievements
Preceded by Chris Blue	The Voice (American); Winner; 2017 (Fall)	Succeeded by Brynn Cartelli
Preceded by "Money on You"	The Voice (American); Winner's song "Wish I Didn't Love You"; 2017 (Fall)	Succeeded by "Walk My Way"
