= Darling Violetta =

American dark wave band

- Origin: United States
- Genres: Dark wave, dream pop
- Years active: 1997-2009
- Label: Opaline Records
- Past members: Cami Elen; Jymm Thomas; Atto Attie; Steve McManus; Chris Pott

Darling Violetta was an American dark wave band based in Los Angeles, California, United States.

== Biography ==
=== Formation: 1996 ===
Darling Violetta was formed in Los Angeles in late 1996 by Cami Elen and Jymm Thomas. Vocalist Elen had previously appeared on the album Pure Hank (1991) by Hank Williams, Jr., and Jymm Thomas was an experienced guitarist.

Originally performing acoustic music in coffeehouses around Los Angeles, Darling Violetta expanded its sound early with the addition of bassist Atto Attie and drummer Steve McManus. The band derived its name from the salutation used by actor Bela Lugosi in letters to his mistress, Violetta Napierska.

=== Bath-Water-Flowers: 1997-1999 ===
In 1997, Darling Violetta answered a call in the Hollywood Reporter for unknown bands to submit music to feature on the soundtrack of an upcoming mockumentary movie, Burn Hollywood Burn. Track "Anastasia Says" was one of the 25 songs ultimately selected from around 9,200 entries. The song featured on Darling Violetta's first record, Bath-Water-Flowers, released on March 10, 1998. Inspired thematically by the character of Ophelia from the Shakespeare play, Hamlet, Bath-Water-Flowers was generally well-received by critics in Los Angeles' music scene.

Cellist Gerri Sutyak joined the band shortly after the release of Bath-Water-Flowers, solidifying the 'cello-rock' sound associated with Darling Violetta's music. Writing in late 1998, Bernard Baur of Music Connection compared the band's sound to The Cranberries, with a repertoire of "moody [and] large musical landscapes" and a "flair for the dramatic."

Also in 1998, Darling Violetta shared a rehearsal space with Four Star Mary, a band involved in the music of the television series Buffy the Vampire Slayer. Through this connection, Darling Violetta received an opportunity to perform on the show in August 1998. The band performed two songs in the Buffy episode "Faith, Hope & Trick" (season 3, episode 3): "Cure" from the then-upcoming Kill You EP, and "Blue Sun" from Bath-Water-Flowers.

In 1999, Darling Violetta wrote the theme song for the Buffy spin-off series, Angel, in collaboration with Holly Knight. The theme, inspired by the superhero genre, took three weeks to compose.

=== The Kill You EP, Parlour, and other activities: 2000-2005 ===
In February 2000, Darling Violetta released their second album, The Kill You EP, which was preceded by the single "Spoiled and Rotten." Described as "melancholy, guitar-driven dream-pop" by AllMusic, the EP was influenced sonically by Nick Cave and PJ Harvey. Throughout 2000 and 2001, Darling Violetta periodically featured in the CMJ Radio Top 200, a collation of the top 200 bands played on North American campus radio stations.

The Kill You EP was followed by a third release, Parlour, in February 2003. Critics for AllMusic and Los Angeles Magazine felt aspects of the album's production were influenced by The Beatles, with the latter review also drawing sonic comparisons to Jane's Addiction.

Outside of the band's independent recordings, Darling Violetta contributed two songs to soundtracks for video games within the Vampire: The Masquerade universe: "I Want to Kill You" in Redemption (2000) and "A Smaller God" in Bloodlines (2004). An extended mix of the band's Angel theme appeared on the 2005 soundtrack album, Angel: Live Fast, Die Never.

=== Hiatus ===
In late 2009, Elen and Thomas reported that they were recording songs for a fourth, untitled release, though this album did not come to fruition. In January 2018, Elen described Darling Violetta as "on an extended hiatus."

== Band members ==
- Cami Elen - vocals, lyrics (1996–2009)
- Jymm Thomas - guitar (1996–2009)
- Atto Attie - bass (1996–2003)
- Steve McManus - drums (1996–2003)
- Gerri Sutyak - cello (1998–2003)

== Discography ==
Darling Violetta's records were released independently through frontwoman Cami Elen's label, Opaline Records.

=== LP ===
- Parlour (2003)

=== EP ===
- Bath Water Flowers (1997)
- The Kill You EP (1999)
