= America (The Way I See It) =

Compilation album by Hank Williams Jr.
- Released: October 1990
- Length: 30:35
- Label: Warner Bros./Curb
- Producer: Barry Beckett; Jimmy Bowen; Jim Ed Norman; Hank Williams Jr.

Hank Williams Jr. chronology
Lone Wolf (1990)	America (The Way I See It) (1990)	Pure Hank (1991)

Professional ratings
Review scores
Source	Rating
Allmusic	3/5 stars

America (The Way I See It) is a compilation album by American musician Hank Williams Jr. It was released by Warner Bros./Curb Records in October 1990. "Don't Give Us a Reason" was released as a single. The album peaked at number 11 on the Billboard Top Country Albums chart and has been certified Gold by the RIAA.

== Track listing ==
No.	Title	Writer(s)	Length
1.	"Don't Give Us a Reason"	Jim Ed Norman, Hank Williams Jr.	2:36
2.	"Mr. Lincoln"	Jimmy Bowen, Johnny MacRae	4:14
3.	"I've Got Rights"	Williams	3:35
4.	"The Coalition to Ban Coalitions"	Williams	2:09
5.	"All My Rowdy Friends Are Coming Over Tonight (Monday Night Football version)"	Williams	2:18
6.	"Give a Damn"	Williams	2:35
7.	"Practice What I Preach"	Norman, Williams	2:43
8.	"The American Way"	Williams	3:06
9.	"A Country Boy Can Survive"	Williams	4:16
10.	"The U.S.A. Today"	Ron Hellard, MacRae	3:18

== Chart performance ==
Chart (1990)	Peak position
U.S. Billboard Top Country Albums	11
U.S. Billboard 200	116

== Certifications ==
Region	Certification	Certified units/sales
United States (RIAA)	Gold	500,000^{^}
^{^} Shipments figures based on certification alone.
