= Brooke Simpson =

American singer

- Born: Brooke Mills Simpson; Hollister, North Carolina, U.S.
- Genres: Pop
- Occupation: Singer
- Instrument: Vocals
- Years active: 2017–present

Brooke Mills Simpson is an American singer. She finished in third place in the 13th season on NBC's talent singing competition The Voice on Team Miley Cyrus.

In 2021, she auditioned for America's Got Talent season 16 of America's Got Talent. She received a yes vote from each judge and advanced to the quarter finals round placing fourth in the finals.

== Early life ==
Brooke Simpson was born to an evangelical family. She discovered she loved singing at age 7. During her childhood she traveled and performed with her family; they attended pow wows hosted by the Haliwa-Saponi, a state-recognized tribe. Simpson is a member of the tribe. Before appearing on The Voice, she moved from her hometown of Hollister, North Carolina to Fort Lauderdale, Florida. She was considering other careers instead of singing. Her parents are Jimille and Mike Mills; she has two siblings who are eight years younger: sister Leah and brother Mikey.

Brooke Simpson met her vocal coach Andrez Franco in 2013.

== Career ==
=== The Voice ===
Simpson auditioned in 2017 for the 13th season of The Voice. In the blind auditions which were broadcast on October 1, 2017, she sang "Stone Cold" by Demi Lovato. The four judges, Adam Levine, Cyrus, Jennifer Hudson, and Blake Shelton turned around. She chose to be part of Team Miley finishing in third place on December 19, 2017.

The Voice performances

– Studio version of performance reached the top 10 on iTunes

| Stage | Song | Original artist | Date | Order | Result |
|---|---|---|---|---|---|
| Blind Audition | "Stone Cold" | Demi Lovato | September 25, 2017 | 1.11 | All four coaches turned; joined Team Miley |
| Battles (Top 48) | "You're a Big Girl Now" (vs. Sophia Bollman) | Bob Dylan | October 16, 2017 | 7.5 | Saved by Coach |
| Knockouts (Top 32) | "(You Make Me Feel Like) A Natural Woman" (vs. Stephan Marcellus) | Aretha Franklin | November 6, 2017 | 13.1 | Saved by Coach |
| Playoffs (Top 24) | "It's a Man's Man's Man's World" | James Brown | November 15, 2017 | 17.1 | Saved by Coach |
| Live Top 12 | "Praying" | Kesha | November 20, 2017 | 18.1 | Saved by Public vote |
| Live Top 11 | "What About Us" | Pink | November 27, 2017 | 20.5 | Saved by Public vote |
| Live Top 10 | "Amazing Grace" | John Newton | December 4, 2017 | 22.8 | Saved by Public vote |
| Live Semifinals (Top 8) | "Earned It" (duet with Davon Fleming) | The Weeknd | December 11, 2017 | 24.4 | Saved by Public vote |
| Live Semifinals (Top 8) | "Faithfully" | Journey | December 11, 2017 | 24.8 | Saved by Public vote |
| Live Finals (Top 4) | "Wrecking Ball" (with Miley Cyrus) | Miley Cyrus | December 18, 2017 | 26.8 | 3rd Place |
| Live Finals (Top 4) | "What is Beautiful" (original song) | Brooke Simpson | December 18, 2017 | 26.4 | 3rd Place |
| Live Finals (Top 4) | "O Holy Night" | Adolphe Adam | December 18, 2017 | 26.10 | 3rd Place |

Non-competition performances
| Collaborator(s) | Song | Original artist |
|---|---|---|
| Miley Cyrus, Ashland Craft and Janice Freeman | "Man! I Feel Like a Woman!" | Shania Twain |
| Sia | "Titanium" | Sia |

=== 1776 revival ===
Simpson played Roger Sherman as part of the 1776 revival at the American Repertory Theater in Boston MA. And would continue to originate the role on Broadway at the American Airlines Theatre in New York. Simpson played Courier in the national touring company in 2023.

== Discography ==
Releases from The Voice

- 2017: "Stone Cold"
- 2017: "You're a Big Girl Now" (with Sophia Bollman)
- 2017: "(You Make Me Feel Like) A Natural Woman"
- 2017: "It's a Man's Man's Man's World"
- 2017: "Praying"
- 2017: "What about Us"
- 2017: "Amazing Grace"
- 2017: "Earned It" (with Davon Fleming)
- 2017: "Faithfully"
- 2017: "Wrecking Ball" (with Miley Cyrus)
- 2017: "O Holy Night"
- 2017: "What Is Beautiful"

== Singles ==
- 2017: "What Is Beautiful"
- 2018: "2 AM"
- 2018: "Perfect"
- 2019: "Little Bit Crazy"
- 2019: "Stick Like Honey"
- 2020: "Real Long Nails"
