= Vampire: The Masquerade – Redemption =

2000 video game

- Developer: Nihilistic Software (Note: Ported to Mac OS by Varcon Systems.)
- Publisher: Activision (Note: Published for Mac OS by MacSoft.)
- Director: Ray Gresko
- Designers: Ray Gresko; Jacob Stephens
- Programmer: Robert Huebner
- Artist: Maarten Kraaijvanger
- Writer: Daniel Greenberg
- Composers: Kevin Manthei; Youth Engine
- Series: Vampire: The Masquerade
- Platforms: Windows, Mac OS
- Release: Windows: NA: June 7, 2000; EU: June 30, 2000; AU: July 26, 2000; Mac OS: NA: November 14, 2001
- Genre: Role-playing
- Modes: Single-player, multiplayer

Vampire: The Masquerade – Redemption is a 2000 role-playing video game developed by Nihilistic Software and published by Activision. The game is based on White Wolf Publishing's tabletop role-playing game Vampire: The Masquerade, a part of the larger World of Darkness series. It follows Christof Romuald, a 12th-century French crusader who is killed and revived as a vampire. The game depicts Christof's centuries-long journey from the Golden Ages of 12th century Prague and Vienna to late-20th century London and New York City in search of his humanity and his kidnapped love, the nun Anezka.

Redemption is presented in the first- and third-person perspectives. The player controls Christof and up to three allies through a linear structure, providing the player with missions to progress through a set narrative. Certain actions committed by Christof throughout the game can raise or lower his humanity, affecting which of the game's three endings the player receives. As a vampire, Christof is imbued with a variety of abilities and powers that can be used to combat or avoid enemies and obstacles. Use of these abilities drains Christof's supply of blood which can be replenished by drinking from enemies or innocents. It includes multiplayer gameplay called "Storyteller", which allows one player to create a narrative for a group of players with the ability to modify the game dynamically in reaction to the players' actions.

Founded in March 1998, Nihilistic's twelve-man team began development of Redemption the following month as their first game. It took the team two years to complete on a budget of US$1.8 million. The team relied on eight outside contractors to provide elements that the team could not supply, such as music and artwork. The game's development was difficult: late changes to software forced the developers to abandon completed code and assets; a focus on high-quality graphics and sound meant that the game ran poorly on some computer systems; and the original scope of the game exceeded the game's schedule and budget, forcing the team to cancel planned features.

Redemption was released for Microsoft Windows in June 2000, with a Mac OS version following in November 2001. The game received a mixed critical response; reviewers praised its graphics and its multiplayer functionality but were polarized by the quality of the story and combat. It received the 1999 Game Critics Awards for Best Role-Playing game. It was successful enough to merit the production of the indirect sequel Vampire: The Masquerade – Bloodlines (2004), which takes place in the same fictional universe.

== Gameplay ==
From the third-person perspective, the player character Christof Romuald wields a melee weapon. The interface shows the inventory on the right, and the current party members at the bottom.

Vampire: The Masquerade – Redemption is a role-playing video game (RPG) presented primarily from the third-person perspective; the playable character is shown on the screen while an optional first-person mode used to view the character's immediate environment is available. The camera can be freely rotated around the character and positioned above it to give a greater overview of the immediate area. The game follows a linear, mission-based structure. Interaction is achieved by using a mouse to click on an enemy or environmental object to attack it or to activate it. Interaction is context based; clicking on an enemy initiates combat, while clicking on a door causes it to open or close.

The playable character can lead a group of three additional allies into battle, controlling their actions to attack a single enemy or to use specific powers. Characters can be set to one of three modes: defensive, neutral, or offensive. In defensive mode, the character remains distant from battles, while offensive mode sends the character directly into battle. The main character and active allies are represented by portraits on screen that reflect their current physical or emotional state, showing sadness, anger, feeding, or the presence of injuries or staking—having been stabbed through the heart and rendered immobile.

The player can access various long-range and melee weapons including swords, shields, bows, and guns, stakes, and holy water. Some weapons have a secondary, more powerful attack; for example a sword can be spun to decapitate a foe. Because they are vampires, allies and enemies are susceptible to damage from sunlight. Disciplines (vampiric powers) are used to supplement physical attacks. Each discipline can be upgraded, becoming a more powerful version of itself; alternatively, other in-game benefits can be gained. The game features disciplines that allow the player to enhance the character's physical abilities such as speed, strength, or durability. Disciplines can also allow the player to mesmerize an enemy or a potential feeding victim, render the character invisible to escape detection, turn the character into mist, summon serpents to attack enemies, heal, revive their allies, and teleport to a haven. Each discipline can be upgraded up to five times, affecting the abilities' durations, the scale of the damage or their effect, and the cost of using it. The characters' health and disciplines are reliant on blood, which can only be replenished by feeding on the living—including other party members—or finding blood containers such as bottles and plasma bags. Drinking an innocent to death and other negative actions reduces the player's humanity, increasing the likelihood of entering a frenzy when injured or low on blood, during which they indiscriminately attack friend and foe.

Completing objectives and defeating enemies is rewarded with experience points, which are used to unlock or upgrade existing disciplines and improve each characters' statistics, such as strength or agility. Weapons, armor, and other accessories can be purchased or upgraded using money or valuable items, which are collected throughout the game. The character's inventory is grid-based; objects occupy an allotted amount of space, requiring the management of the storage space available. A belt allows some items to be selected for immediate use during gameplay, such as healing items, without the need to access them in the main inventory. The first version of the game allows progress to be saved only in the main character's haven or safehouse; it automatically saves other data at specific points. An update to the game enabled players to save their in-game data at any point in the in-game narrative.

Redemption features an online multiplayer component which allows players to engage in scenarios together. One player assumes the role of the Storyteller, guiding other players through a scenario using the Storyteller interface. The interface allows the Storyteller to create or modify scenarios by placing items, monsters, and characters across the map. Character statistics, such as experience points, abilities, and disciplines, can also be modified. Finally, the Storyteller can assume the role of any character at any given time. These functions allow the Storyteller to dynamically manipulate the play environment while the other players traverse it.

== Synopsis ==
=== Setting ===
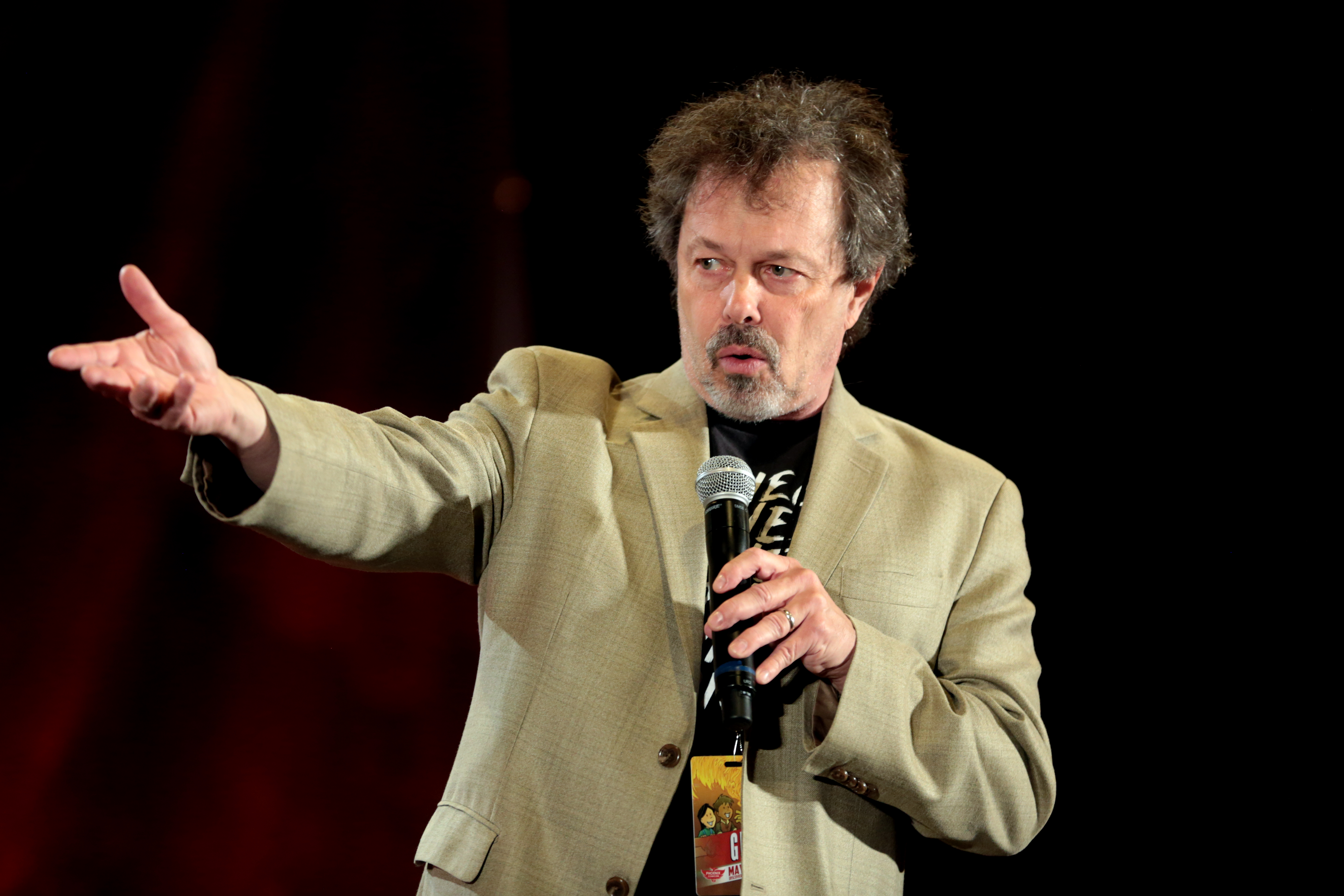
Actor Curtis Armstrong (pictured in 2017) voiced the 20th century vampire Pink.

The events depicted in Vampire: The Masquerade – Redemption occur in two time periods: 12th century Prague and Vienna, and late-20th century London and New York City. The game is set in the World of Darkness; it depicts a world in which vampires, werewolves, demons, and other creatures influence human history. The vampires are divided into seven Clans of the Camarilla—the vampire government—each with distinctive traits and abilities. The Toreadors are the closest to humanity—they have a passion for culture; the Ventrue are noble, powerful leaders; the Brujah are idealists who excel at fighting; the Malkavians are either cursed with insanity or blessed with insight; the Gangrel are loners in synchronization with their animalistic nature; the Tremere are secretive, untrustworthy, and wield blood magic; and the monstrous Nosferatu are condemned to remain hidden in the shadows. Redemption also features the Cappadocian clan; the Society of Leopold—modern-day vampire hunters; the Assamite clan of assassin vampires; the Setite clan; the Tzimisce clan, the Giovanni clan, and the Sabbat—vampires who revel in their nature, embracing the beast within.

The main character of Redemption is French crusader Christof Romuald, a once-proud, religious church knight who is transformed into a Brujah vampire. With his religious faith destroyed, Christof is forced to reassess his understanding of good and evil as he acclimates to his new life. Christof's anchor to humanity is the nun Anezka, a human with a pure soul who loves Chrisof even after his transformation. As a member of the Brujah under Ecaterina the Wise, Christof allies with Wilhem Streicher, the Gangrel Erik, and the Cappadocian Serena during his journeys through 12th century Prague. Other characters in this era include the slaver Count Orsi, the Tremere Etrius, and the Ventrue Prince Brandl.

Christof continues his quest into the late-20th century, where he allies with the Brujah Pink, the enslaved Toreador Lily, and the Nosferatu Samuel. Other characters include the 300-year-old human leader of the Society of Leopold, Leo Allatius—who has unnaturally extended his lifespan by consuming vampire blood— and the Setite leader Lucretia. During his journey, Christof comes into conflict with Vukodlak, a powerful Tzimisce vampire intent on usurping the clans' ancestors and taking their power for himself. Trapped in a mystical sleep by those who oppose his plot, Vukodlak commands his followers to help resurrect him.

=== Plot ===
In 1141, in Prague, crusader Christof Romuald is wounded in battle. He recovers in a church, where he is cared for by a nun called Anezka. The pair instantly fall in love but are restrained by their commitments to God. Christof enters a nearby silver mine to kill a monstrous Tzimisce vampire who is tormenting the city. Christof's victory is noted by the local vampires, one of whom, Ecaterina the Wise, turns him into a vampire to prevent another clan from taking him.

Initially defiant, Christof agrees to accompany Ecaterina's servant Wilhem on a mission to master his new vampiric abilities. Afterward, he meets with Anezka, but refuses to taint her with his cursed state. At Ecaterina's haven, the Brujah tell Christof about an impending war between the Tremere and Tzimisce clans that will devastate humans caught in the middle. Wilhem and Christof gain the favor of the local Jews and Cappadocians, who devote their member Serena to their cause. The Ventrue Prince Brandl tells the group that the Tremere in Vienna are turning humans into ghouls—servitors addicted to and empowered by vampire blood. The group infiltrate the Tremere chantry in Prague, and prevent the Gangrel Erik being turned into a Gargoyle, leading him to join their party. Christof learns that Anezka, seeking Christof's redemption, has visited the Tzimisce clan and the Vienna Tremere stronghold, Haus de Hexe. There, the Tremere leader Etrius completes Erik's transformation into a Gargoyle, forcing Christof to kill him. Etrius reveals that the Tzimisce abducted Anezka.

Returning to Prague, Christof learns that humans are attacking the Tzimisce in nearby Vyšehrad Castle. Christof, Wilhem, and Serena infiltrate the castle and find that the powerful, slumbering Vukodlak has enslaved Anezka as a ghoul. Anezka rejects Christof and prepares to revive Vukodlak, but the human assault collapses the castle upon them.

In 1999, the Society of Leopold excavates the site of Vyšehrad Castle; they recover Christof's body and take it to London, where he is awoken by a female voice. He learns that the events at Vyšehrad and resulting human uprising divided the vampires into two sects: the Camarilla—who conceal themselves from humanity—and the Sabbat—who want to regain dominion over it. The Society's excavation also enables Vukodlak's followers to reclaim Vyšehrad. After escaping, Christof meets Pink, who agrees to help him. They learn that the Setite clan has been shipping Vyšehrad contraband to New York City and infiltrate a Setite brothel to gain information. They kill the Setite leader Lucretia and recruit Lily, an enslaved prostitute.

Christof, Pink, and Lily travel to New York City aboard a contraband ship, rescue the Nosferatu Samuel from the Sabbat, and infiltrate a warehouse storing the Vyšehrad contraband. There they encounter Wilhem, who is now a Sabbat under Ecaterina following the collapse of their group. Wilhem reveals that Pink is an assassin working for Vukodlak. Pink escapes and Wilhem rejoins Christof, hoping to reclaim the humanity he has sacrificed during the previous 800 years. Together, Christof, Wilhem, Lily, and Samuel learn that Vukodlak is hidden beneath a church within his Cathedral of Flesh and that Anezka is still in his servitude. In the cathedral, the group finds that Vukodlak has awoken; he tries to influence Christof by offering him Anezka and then revealing that she is dependent on Vukodlak's blood to survive. Christof refuses and Vukodlak drops the group into tunnels beneath the cathedral. Christof finds the Wall of Memories, which hold Anezka's memories of the last millennia, showing she continued to hope as Vukodlak found new ways to defile and torment her. She eventually sacrificed her innocence to gain Vukodlak's trust, using her position to delay his resurrection over the centuries until, with no options left, she prayed for Christof's return. The group returns to the Cathedral and battles Vukodlak.

The ending of Redemption varies depending upon the quantity of humanity Christof has retained during the game. If the quantity is great, Christof kills Vukodlak, reconciles with Anezka, and turns her into a vampire, sparing her from death. If his humanity is moderate, he surrenders to Vukodlak and is blood bound to him; Vukodlak betrays Christof and forces him to murder Anezka. A lesser quantity of humanity results in Christof killing Vukodlak by drinking his blood. Greatly empowered, Christof forsakes his humanity, murders Anezka, and revels in his new power.

== Development ==
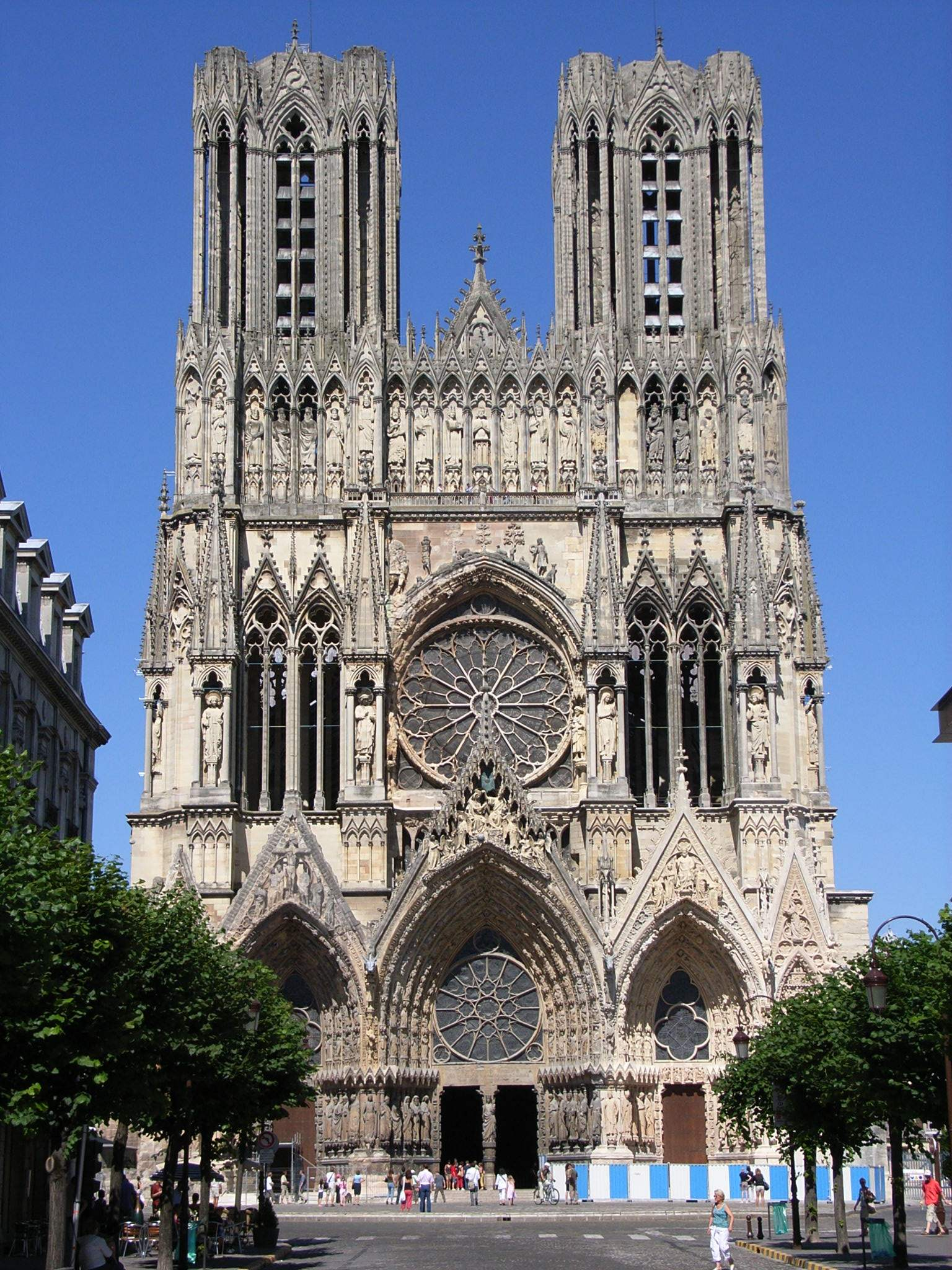
Gothic aesthetics are present throughout the Vampire: The Masquerade series. Nihilistic had developed an original game concept with similar designs and themes prior to their work on Redemption.

The development of Vampire: The Masquerade – Redemption began at Nihilistic Software in April 1998, shortly after the developer's founding in March that year. Its development was publicly announced in March 1999. Intending to move away from the first-person games the team members had worked on with previous companies, Nihilistic prepared a design and story for a futuristic RPG with similar themes and gothic aesthetics to those of the Vampire: The Masquerade series. After publisher Activision approached the team using the White Wolf license, they adapted parts of their original design to fit the Vampire series, which became the original design for Redemption. Endorsement by Id Software founder John Carmack helped Nihilistic decide to work with Activision. The Nihilistic team developed Redemption over twenty-four months; the team expanded to twelve members by the end of development. The development team included Nihilistic President and CEO Ray Gesko, lead programmer Rob Huebner, world designer Steve Tietze, level designer Steve Thoms, lead artist Maarten Kraaijvanger, artist Yujin Kiem, art technician Anthony Chiang, and programmers Yves Borckmans and Ingar Shu.

Activision provided a budget of US$1.8 million; the amount was intentionally kept low to make the project manageable for Nihilistic and reduce the risk to Activision, which was relatively inexperienced with RPGs at the time. Nihilistic's management was committed to the entire team working in a one-room environment with no walls, doors, or offices, believing this would force the individual groups to communicate and allow each department to respond to queries immediately, saving hours or days of development time. Redemption's story was developed with input from Wolf; it was co-written by Daniel Greenberg, a writer for the source pen-and-paper RPG.

The small size of the team led to Nihilistic relying on eight external contractors to provide elements the team could not supply. Nick Peck was chosen to provide sounds effects, ambient loops, and additional voice recordings based on his previous work on Grim Fandango (1998). Kevin Manthei provided the musical score for the game's 12th century sections, while a duo called Youth Engine provided the modern-day sections' score. Some artwork was outsourced; Peter Chan (Day of the Tentacle (1993) and Grim Fandango) developed concept art to establish the look of the game's environments, and Patrick Lambert developed character concepts and full-color drawings for the modelers and animators to use. Huebner considered the most important external relationship was with a small start-up company called Oholoko, which produced cinematic movies for the game's story elements and endings. Nihilistic met with various computer animation firms but their prices were too expensive for the project budget.

Redemption was officially released to manufacturing on May 30, 2000. The game features 300,000 lines of code, with a further 66,000 lines of Java for scripts. In January 2000, it was announced that Nihilistic was seeking a studio to port Redemption to the Sega Dreamcast video game console, however this version was never released. In February 2001, after the release of the PC version, it was announced that MacSoft was developing a MacOS version of the game.

=== Technology ===
Nihilistic initially looked at existing game engines such as the Quake engine and Unreal Engine, but decided those engines, which were primarily designed for first-person shooters, would not be sufficient for its point-and-click driven RPG and decided to create its own engine for development of Redemption. This was the NOD engine, which the developers could customize for the game's 3D perspective and role-playing mechanics. The team also considered that developing its own engine would allow it to freely reuse code for future projects or to license the engine for profit. NOD was prototyped using the Glide application programming interface (API) because the team believed it would be more stable during the engine's development, intending that once the engine was more complete, it would be moved to a more general API designed to support a wide range of hardware such as Direct3D. However, once a basic engine was in place in Glide, the programmers turned their attention to gameplay and functionality. By June 1999, Redemption was still running in Glide, which at that point lacked some of the basic features the team needed to demonstrate at that year's Electronic Entertainment Expo. When the team eventually switched to Direct3D, it was forced to abandon some custom code it had built to compensate for Glide's limitations such as texture and graphic management, which required the re-exporting of hundreds of levels and models for the new software. The late API switch also limited the time available to test the game's compatibility on a wide range of hardware. The team focused on building the game for hardware accelerated systems to avoid the limitations of supporting a wider range of systems, which had restricted the development of the company founders' previous game, Star Wars Jedi Knight: Dark Forces II (1997).

The programmers suggested using 3D Studio Max for art and level design, which would save money by allowing the company to license a single piece of software, but the lead artists successfully lobbied against this plan, believing that allowing the respective teams to choose the software would allow them to work most efficiently. Huebner said this saved the project more time than any other decision made during development. The level designers chose QERadiant to take advantage of their previous experience using the software while working on Id Software's Quake series. Id allowed Nihilistic to license QERadiant and modify it to create a customized tool for its 3D environments. Because QERadiant was a finished, functional tool, it allowed the level designers to begin developing levels from the project's start and then export them into the NOD engine, rather than waiting for up to six months for Nihilistic to develop a custom tool or learning a new 3D level editor. In twenty-four months, the three level designers built over 100 in-game environments for Redemption. They obtained blueprints and sketches of buildings from medieval Prague and Vienna to better represent that period and locations. The four-person art team led by Kraaijvanger used Alias Wavefront Maya to create 3D art. Nihilistic's management wanted Kraaijvanger to use a less expensive tool but relented when the cost was found to be lower than had been thought. Throughout the project, the art team built over 1,500 3D models.

At the start of development, Nihilistic wanted to support editing of the game by the user-community, having seen the benefits to the community while working on other games. Staff who worked on Jedi Knight knew the experience of creating a new, customized programming language called COG that gave the programmers the results they wanted but cost time and significant project resources. With Redemption, they wanted to incorporate an existing scripting engine that would more easily enable users to further develop the game instead of developing their own code again, which would consume months of development time. The team tested various languages, but became aware of another studio, Rebel Boat Rocker, which was receiving attention for its use of the Java language. Speaking to that studio's lead programmer Billy Zelsnak, Nihilistic decided to experiment with Java, having little prior knowledge of it. The language successfully integrated into the NOD engine without problems, providing a standardized and freely distributable scripting engine. Several designers were trained to use Java to allow them to build the several hundred scripts required to drive the game's storyline.

=== Design ===
The Nihilistic team used their experience adapting an existing property for the Star Wars games to design Redemption. Reasoning that most people would be familiar with vampire tropes, the team wrote the game assuming players would not need an explanation of the genre's common elements, while enabling them to explore White Wolf's additions to the mythos. When translating the pen-and-paper RPG to a video game, the team redesigned some of the disciplines to make them simpler to understand. For example, in the pen-and-paper game, the "Protean" discipline includes the abilities to see in the dark, grow claws, melt into the ground, and change into an animal, however in Redemption these were made into individual disciplines to make them instantly accessible, instead of requiring the player to select Protean and then select one of the sub-abilities.

Huebner said the team struggled with restraint. From inception, the team had developed its assets for a high-end system to ensure the finished project would have top-of-the-range graphics, and because if necessary, it could more easily scale down the art down than scale it up. However, the art teams were not stopped from producing new assets, resulting in Redemption requiring approximately 1GB of storage space to install. Additionally, textures were made in 32-bit color, models were extremely detailed—featuring between 1,000 and 2,000 triangles each on average—and levels were illuminated with high-resolution light-maps. Because the game was designed for high-end computer systems, it relied on algorithms to scale down the models; combined with the high detail art assets, Redemption was taxing to run on low- and mid-range systems. Nihilistic had intended to include both 16-bit and 32-bit versions of the game textures, and different sound quality levels to allow players to choose which versions to install, but the CD-ROM format was not spacious enough to accommodate more than one version of the game. The finished product barely fitted onto two CD-ROMs; some sound assets were removed to fit the format. This caused the game to use a large amount of computer resources and limited the ability to port it to more limited console environments.

The programmers identified early on that pathfinding—the ability of the variable-sized characters to navigate through the environment—would be a problem. Huebner cited the difficulty of programming characters to navigate an environment in which level designers are free to add stairs, ramps, and other 3D objects. They came up with a temporary solution and planned to improve the pathfinding later into development. By the time they properly addressed the problem, many of the levels were almost complete and featured few markers the programmers could use to control movement. They could identify walkable tiles but not walls, cliffs, and other environmental hazards. Ideal solutions, such as creating zones for characters to walk through would have taken too much time to retroactively add into the 100 created levels, so the programmers spent several weeks making small, iterative fixes to conceal the obvious errors in the pathfinding and leave less obvious ones intact.

From the outset, the team wanted to make a grand RPG, but were restricted by their budget and schedule. They were reluctant to cut any content such as one of the time periods or the multiplayer aspect, and they decided to postpone the original release date from March 2000 to June the same year. They also scaled back the scope of their multiplayer testing and canceled the planned release of an interactive pre-launch demo. The delay allowed Nihilistic to retain most of the intended design but they were forced to remove the ability to play the entire single-player campaign as a team online, compensating for this by adding two multiplayer scenarios built using levels from the single-player game. Huebner said they did not plan appropriately for multiplayer when building the Java scripts for the single-player game, meaning the scripts did not work effectively in multiplayer mode.

The multiplayer "Storyteller" mode was conceived early in the development cycle. Diverting from the typical death match or co-operative gameplay multiplayer modes, Storyteller required Nihilistic to develop an interface that could give one player, the Storyteller, enough control to run a particular scenario, and change events in the game in real time without making it too complex to understand for the average player. Much of the technology was simple to implement, requiring typical multiplayer software components that would allow users to connect with each other. The largest task required the development of an interface that could provide the Storyteller with control over the aspects of a multiplayer game without it becoming too complex. The interface had to contain lists of objects, characters, and other resources, and options to manipulate those resources. It had to be mostly accessible using a mouse as input, reserving the keyboard for less common and more advanced commands. The mode was inspired by the text-based Multi-User Dungeon, a multiplayer real-time virtual world in which high-ranking users can manipulate the game's environment and dynamically create adventures.

== Release ==
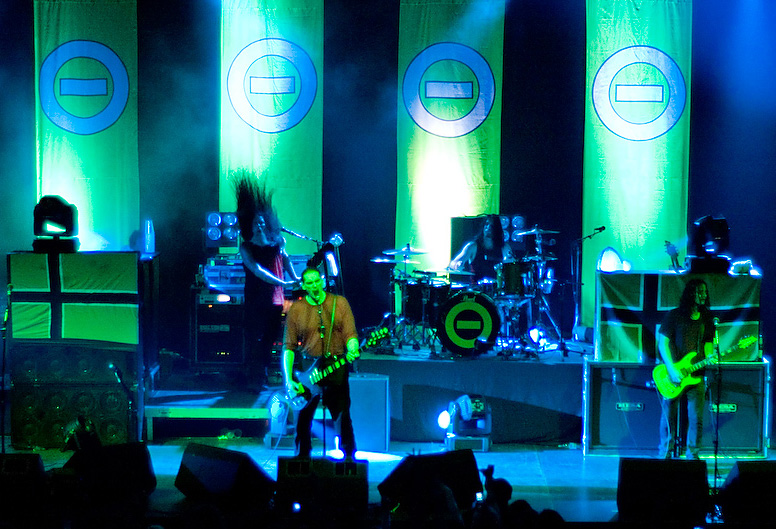
The soundtrack includes songs by Type O Negative (pictured), Ministry, and Darling Violetta among others.

Vampire: The Masquerade – Redemption was released for Microsoft Windows in North America on June 7, 2000, Europe on June 30, and Australia on July 26. The game's release included a standalone copy of the game, and a Collector's Edition containing a copy of the game, a hardbound, limited edition of White Wolf's The Book of Nod chronicling the first vampire, a Camarilla pendant, a strategy guide, and an alternative game case cover. The Collector's Edition also included a copy of the game's soundtrack, featuring songs by Type O Negative, Gravity Kills, Ministry, Darling Violetta, Cubanate, Primus, Youth Engine, and Kevin Manthei. Nihilistic also released Embrace, a level editor with access to the game's code to allow users to modify levels and scripts. Developed by Varcon Systems, a port for Mac OS was released on November 14, 2001.

During its first week on sale, Redemption was the third best-selling Windows game in the United States behind The Sims and Who Wants To Be A Millionaire 2nd Edition. Sales of the Collector's Edition were individually tracked; it was the fifth best-selling game that same week. According to the sale tracking firm PC Data, Redemption had sold approximately 111,193 units across North America by October, earning $4.88 million. Approximately 57,000 units were sold in Germany by March 2001. It spent four months on its list of the 30 top-selling games, peaking at number 5 in July 2000, before leaving the charts in October. Redemption received a digital release on the GOG.com service in February 2010. Redemption achieved enough success to merit the 2004 release of an indirect sequel, Vampire: The Masquerade – Bloodlines, which is set in the same fictional universe and was developed by Troika Games.

In 2022, it was announced that fans were remaking Redemption as a total conversion mod for The Elder Scrolls V: Skyrim called Vampire: The Masquerade - Redemption Reawakened. Although the project was supported by Paradox Interactive—the current rightsholders of the Vampire: The Masquerade license—Activision, which owns specific elements from Redemption, refused permission. As of 2024, the developers renamed the project Vampire: The Masquerade - Reawakened, intending to make a legally distinct game in the setting.

== Reception ==
Reception

Aggregate score
Aggregator	Score
Metacritic	74/100

Review scores
Publication	Score
Computer Gaming World	1.5/5
Eurogamer	6/10
GameRevolution	B−
GameSpot	6.8/10
Next Generation	3/5
PC Gamer (US)	76%
PC Zone	90/100
Computer Games Magazine	4/5

The aggregating review websites Metacritic provides the game a score of 74 out of 100 based on 22 reviews. Reviewers compared it to other successful RPGs, including Diablo II, Deus Ex, Darkstone, and the Final Fantasy series.

The game's graphics received near-unanimous praise. Game Revolution said its "brilliant" graphics were among "the best in gaming" and Next Generation said the graphics were the best in any PC RPG. Computer Games said it was the most attractive PC game at the time, ArsTechnica said it was the best game to look at and watch since The Last Express (1997), and PC Gamer said, "there has never been a more beautifully created RPG". The level design and environments were praised for the level of detail, providing a brooding, atmospheric aesthetic with "painstaking" detail. Reviewers also made positive comments about the game's lighting effects. Conversely, Computer Gaming World (CGW) said that while the game was attractive, the visuals were superficial and failed to emphasize the game's horror elements. They were also critical of the third-person in-game camera positioning, claiming that it obscured the area directly in front of the player and did not allow the player to look upwards.

Responses to the story were ambivalent; some reviewers called it strong with good dialog; others said it was poor. GameRevolution and CGW called the dialog poor, sophomoric, and often overly-verbose; in particular CGW said some speeches became an "agonizingly long filibuster" that only served to delay the return of control to the player. Other sources called it one of the richest, most engrossing stories to be found outside films and novels, and more original than most RPGs. Computer Games criticized the linear storyline, and said the few dialog choices available to the player had no real impact on the storytelling. CGW said the linear story prevented Redemption from being a true RPG because it lacked interaction with many characters, and the lack of player impact on the story made it seem as though they were not building characters but rather were getting them to the story milestones. According to PC Gamer, while the game's linearity was a negative, it kept the narrative tight and compelling.

Reviewers variously appreciated and disliked the voice acting. Game Revolution and Computer Games said the acting ranged from adequate to good, while CGW said the voices were inappropriate and the 12th century European voices sounding like modern Americans, but that the modern era featured better actors. ArsTechnica said the acting was inconsistent but was better than that of Deus Ex. The weather effects, background sound, and moody music were said to blend together well and help immerse the player in the game's world. CGW said the sound quality was sometimes poor.

Much of Redemption's criticism focused on technical problems when it was released, undermining the game experience or making it unplayable. Several reviewers noted issues with the initial lack of a function to save game progress at any point, which meant that dying or technical issues with the game could necessitate them to reload a previous save, and then repeat up to 30 minutes of gameplay. CGW added that the repetitive gameplay meant that losing progress and having to repeat it was a particular downside. Next Generation, who provided the game with a score of 3 out of 5, said that Redemption was potentially only a few patches away from being a 5 out of 5 game, if not for technical issues. PC Gamer's review even included recommended instructions for cheats that worked around the technical flaws.

CGW said the in-game combat became a confusing mess once allies became involved, in part due to poor artificial intelligence (AI) that caused them to use powers liberally and become low on blood as a result. The AI was considered to be insufficient for the game; pathfinding failures meant allies would become stuck on environmental objects or each other during combat, use up their costliest abilities on enemies regardless of their threat, and were poor at staying alive in battle. Enemies were similarly dismissed for either not noticing the playable character in obvious circumstances or failing to respond to attacks on themselves.

Combat was also criticized; Computer Games called the game "little more than a hack-and-slash adventure", and said the game's focus on combat was counter to the greater focus on political intrigue and social interaction prevalent in the source Vampire: The Masquerade tabletop game. ArsTechnica said that combat was initially fun but very repetitive, and it became a chore by the later stages of the game, noting that every enemy dungeon consisted of four levels filled with identical enemies, while Next Generation said the number of enemies and the difficulty of defeating them often meant the playable character would run away or die. The repetitive combat was also criticized by other reviewers, who disliked that it involved repeatedly clicking on enemies until they were dead; and running away if the playable character was about to die against unending waves of enemies. Disciplines were considered helpful in adding variety to combat, but battles were too fast-paced to allow the tactical use of a wide range of powers because of the inability to pause the combat to allow the issuing of orders.

Game Revolution said the multiplayer feature was a revelation and worth the cost of the game alone. Computer Games said it was innovative and may serve as an inspiration for future games. PC Gamer said the multiplayer mode was the redeeming factor of the game, though it was still marred by bugs. Others noted that aspects of the multiplayer interface were insufficient, such as the inability to store custom dialog, requiring the Storyteller to type text in real time during gameplay.

=== Accolades ===
At the 1999 Game Critics Awards, Redemption was named Best RPG ahead of the first-person action RPG Deus Ex.

== Works cited ==
- Erickson, Daniel (August 2000). "Vampire: The Masquerade - Redemption". Next Generation (8 (Lifecycle 2)). Imagine Media: 84–85.
- Green, Jeff (April 1999). "Vampire The Masquerade: Redemption". Computer Gaming World (177). Ziff Davis: 108–115.
- Hill, Mark (August 2000). "Vampire: The Masquerade - Redemption". PC Zone (92). Dennis Publishing: 59–62.
- McDonald, T. Liam (October 2000). "Games & Books - Vampire: The Masquerade—Redemption". Games. 24 (7). Games Publications: 57. ISSN 0199-9788.
- Mallinson, Paul (August 1999). "Sink Your Teeth Into...Vampire: The Masquerade - Redemption". PC Zone (79). Dennis Publishing: 41–44.
- "NachSpiel". PC Player. Future Verlag GmbH. March 2001.
- Wolf, Michael (September 2000). "Vampire: The Masquerade - Redemption". PC Gamer. 7 (9). Future plc: 94–96.
- "Vampire: The Masquerade - Redemption". Next Generation (53 (Lifecycle 1)). Imagine Media: 39–42. May 1999.
