= Wish I Didn't Love You =

Single by Chloe Kohanski
- Released: December 18, 2017
- Genre: Soft rock
- Length: 3:40
- Label: Republic

"Wish I Didn't Love You" is a song by American rock singer Chloe Kohanski. It is Chloe's coronation single following her victory on the 13th season of the singing competition The Voice. The song debuted and peaked at number sixty-nine on Billboard Hot 100 for the chart dated January 3, 2018.

== Track listing ==
Digital download
No.	Title	Length
1.	"Wish I Didn't Love You" (The Voice Performance)	3:40

== Charts ==
Chart (2017)	Peak position
US Billboard Hot 100	69
