= Pure Hank =

Studio album by Hank Williams Jr.
- Released: April 1991
- Studio: The Castle, Franklin TN, Digital Recorders, Emerald Sound Studios, Masterfonics Studios, Nashville, TN
- Length: 37:17
- Label: Warner Bros./Curb
- Producer: Barry Beckett; Jim Ed Norman; Hank Williams Jr.

Hank Williams Jr. chronology
America (The Way I See It) (1990)	Pure Hank (1991)	Maverick (1992)

Singles from Pure Hank
- 1. "If It Will, It Will" Released: May 4, 1991

Professional ratings
Review scores
Source	Rating
Allmusic	2.5/5 stars

Pure Hank is the forty-third studio album by American musician Hank Williams Jr. It was released by Warner Bros./Curb Records in April 1991. "If It Will, It Will" and "Angels Are Hard to Find" were released as singles with the former becoming Williams' final top 40 country single, peaking at #26, until the release of "I'm One of You" in 2003. The album peaked at number 8 on the Billboard Top Country Albums chart and has been certified Gold by the RIAA.

"Angels Are Hard to Find" is a re-recording of a song Hank had released on his 1974 album, Living Proof. This album's version was featured in the 2013 film Gravity. "(I've Got My) Future on Ice" is a Jimmy Martin cover. "Just to Satisfy You" is a cover of a Waylon Jennings song that Waylon released twice in the 1960s and recorded as a #1 duet with Willie Nelson in 1982. "Simple Man" is a cover of Lynyrd Skynyrd's 1973 classic from their debut album.

== Track listing ==
No.	Title	Writer(s)	Length
1.	"If It Will, It Will"	Hank Williams Jr.	3:21
2.	"Angels Are Hard to Find"	Williams	3:23
3.	"Kiss Mother Nature Goodbye"	Roger Murrah, J. B. Rudd	3:44
4.	"(I've Got My) Future on Ice"	Jerry Crutchfield, Edria A. Humphrey	3:04
5.	"Be Careful Who You Love (Arthur's Song)"	Harlan Howard	4:34
6.	"Memphis Belle"	Williams	3:28
7.	"Honky Tonk Train"	Williams	3:31
8.	"Hollywood Honeys"	John Martin, James R. Pulte	2:58
9.	"Just to Satisfy You"	Don Bowman, Waylon Jennings	3:13
10.	"Simple Man"	Gary Rossington, Ronnie Van Zant	6:03

== Personnel ==
- Eddie Bayers – drums
- Michael Black – background vocals
- Kathy Burdick – background vocals
- Cami Elen – background vocals
- Paul Franklin – dobro
- Rob Hajacos – fiddle
- Mike Haynes – trumpet
- Mike Henderson – slide guitar
- Bobby Hicks – fiddle
- Jim Horn – flute, baritone saxophone
- Byron House – programming
- Dann Huff – electric guitar
- Mike Lawler – synthesizer
- Bernie Leadon – mandolin
- "Cowboy" Eddie Long – steel guitar
- Yvette Marine – background vocals
- Carl Marsh – programming
- Terry McMillan – harmonica
- Kim Morrison – background vocals
- Jonell Mosser – background vocals
- Don Potter – acoustic guitar
- Michael Rhodes – bass guitar
- Matt Rollings – keyboards
- Charles Rose – trombone
- David Schnaufer – culca, dulcimer
- Denis Solee – tenor saxophone
- Julie Stevens – background vocals
- Harry Stinson – background vocals
- Wayne Turner – electric guitar
- Hank Williams Jr. – lead vocals
- Dennis Wilson – background vocals
- Curtis Young – background vocals
- Reggie Young – electric guitar

== Chart performance ==
Chart (1991)	Peak position
U.S. Billboard Top Country Albums	8
U.S. Billboard 200	50

== Certifications ==
Region	Certification	Certified units/sales
United States (RIAA)	Gold	500,000^{^}
^{^} Shipments figures based on certification alone.
