= Savnt =

American singer

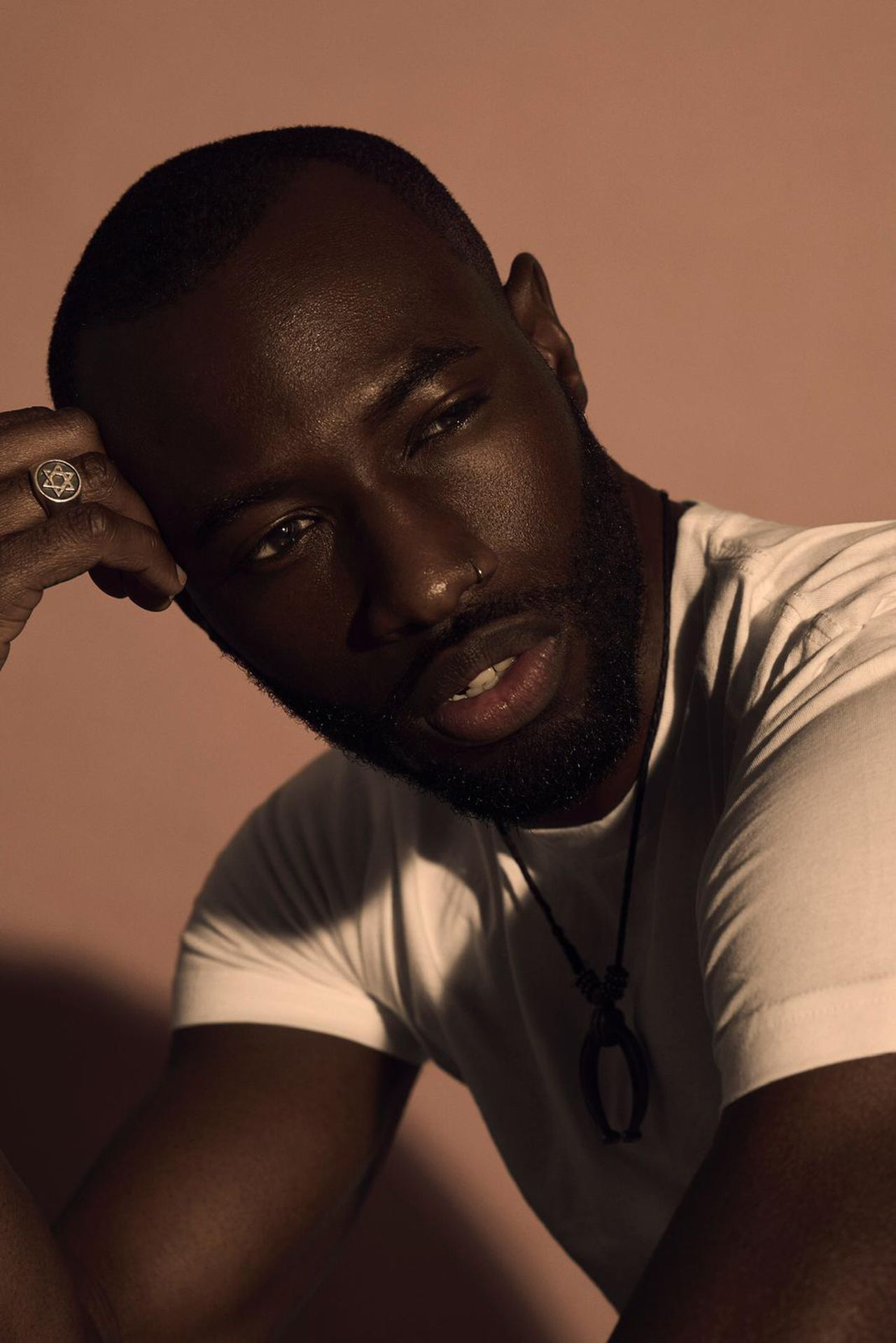
- Savnt photographed in 2020.

Background information
- Born: Stephan Marcellus Sertima; October 13, 1995 (age 31); Englewood, New Jersey, U.S.
- Genres: Soul; neo soul; pop; R&B
- Occupations: Singer; songwriter
- Instrument: Vocals
- Years active: 2014–present
- Website: StephanMarcellusMusic.com

Savnt (born Stephan Marcellus Sertima; October 13, 1995) is an American vocalist and songwriter from Englewood, New Jersey.

Marcellus competed on the 13th season of NBC's television series The Voice. He later released several singles and collaborations with other recording artists.

== Discography ==
=== Studio albums ===
- Renegade (2018)

=== EPs ===
- Rock & Blues (2021)

== Singles ==
List of singles, with selected chart positions and certifications, showing year released and album name
Title	Year	Album
"We All Try (Frank Ocean Cover)"	2014	
"Puppeteer"	2015	
"Take Me to Church (The Voice Performance)"	2017	
"O Holy Night!"	2017	
"Renegade"	2017	
"Conqueror"	2020	
"People" (f. Noah Mac & Geno Five)	2020	
"HolyWater" (f. SNT JMS)	2020	

== Guest appearances ==
List of guest appearances, with other performing artists, showing year released and album name
Title	Year	Artist(s)	Album
"Blackouts"	2017	Marcus Orelias	20s a Difficult Age
"Atrium" (produced by Lee Major)	2017	Marcus Orelias	20s a Difficult Age
"Fate"	2017	Marcus Orelias	20s a Difficult Age
"Take it From the Top"	2018	Bobby DiBlasio	TBA
"Believing in You"	2018	Bobby DiBlasio	TBA
