= If It Will, It Will =

Single by Hank Williams Jr.

from the album Pure Hank
- B-side: "Won't It Be Nice"
- Released: May 4, 1991
- Genre: Country
- Length: 3:21
- Label: Warner Bros./Curb
- Songwriter(s): Hank Williams Jr.
- Producer(s): Barry Beckett, Hank Williams Jr., Jim Ed Norman

Hank Williams Jr. singles chronology
"I Mean I Love You" (1991)	"If It Will, It Will" (1991)	"Angels Are Hard to Find" (1991)

"If It Will, It Will" is a song written and recorded by American country music artist Hank Williams Jr. It was released in May 1991 as the first single from the album Pure Hank. The song reached No. 26 on the Billboard Hot Country Singles & Tracks chart.

== Chart performance ==
Chart (1991)	Peak position
US Hot Country Songs (Billboard)	26
Canadian RPM Country Tracks	24
