= Moe Bandy discography =

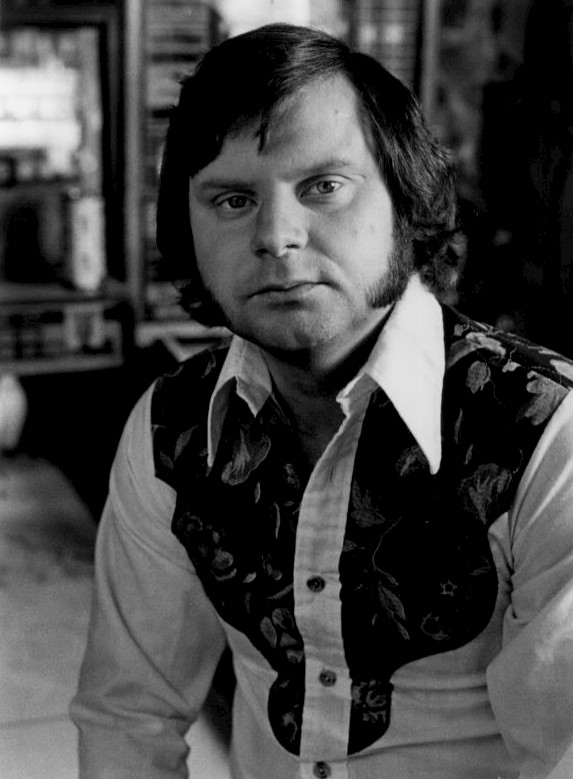
- Bandy in 1977
- Studio albums: 36
- Live albums: 3
- Compilation albums: 7
- Singles: 54
- Music videos: 4

Moe Bandy is an American country music artist. His discography consists of 36 studio albums, seven compilation albums, three live albums, 54 singles, and five music videos. 51 of his singles charted on the Billboard Hot Country Songs chart between 1974 and 1989, including the number one hits "Just Good Ol' Boys" (with Joe Stampley) and "I Cheated Me Right Out of You", both in 1979.

== Studio albums ==
=== 1970s ===
Title	Album details	Peak positions	
Title	Album details	US Country	CAN Country
I Just Started Hatin' Cheatin' Songs Today	Release year: 1974; Label: GRC	11	—
It Was Always So Easy (To Find an Unhappy Woman)	Release year: 1974; Label: GRC	9	—
Bandy the Rodeo Clown	Release year: 1975; Label: GRC	27	—
Hank Williams, You Wrote My Life	Release year: 1976; Label: Columbia	13	—
Here I Am Drunk Again	Release year: 1976; Label: Columbia	17	—
I'm Sorry for You My Friend	Release year: 1977; Label: Columbia	18	—
Cowboys Ain't Supposed to Cry	Release year: 1977; Label: Columbia	22	—
Soft Lights and Hard Country Music	Release year: 1978; Label: Columbia	34	5
Love Is What Life's All About	Release year: 1978; Label: Columbia	33	—
It's a Cheating Situation	Release year: 1979; Label: Columbia	19	13
Just Good Ol' Boys (with Joe Stampley)	Release year: 1979; Label: Columbia	11	—
One of a Kind	Release year: 1979; Label: Columbia	44	—
"—" denotes releases that did not chart

=== 1980s ===
Title	Album details	Peak positions		
Title	Album details	US Country	US	CAN Country
The Champ	Release year: 1980; Label: Columbia	57	—	6
Following the Feeling	Release year: 1980; Label: Columbia	44	—	—
Hey Joe! Hey Moe! (with Joe Stampley)	Release year: 1981; Label: Columbia	23	170	—
Rodeo Romeo	Release year: 1981; Label: Columbia	48	—	—
She's Not Really Cheatin' (She's Just Gettin' Even)	Release year: 1982; Label: Columbia	19	—	—
Moe Bandy Salutes the American Cowboy	Release year: 1982; Label: CSP / Warwick	—	—	—
I Still Love You in the Same Ol' Way	Release year: 1982; Label: Columbia	—	—	—
Moe Bandy Sings the Songs of Hank Williams	Release year: 1983; Label: Columbia	—	—	—
Devoted to Your Memory	Release year: 1983; Label: Columbia	41	—	—
The Good Ol' Boys — Alive and Well (with Joe Stampley)	Release year: 1984; Label: Columbia	21	—	—
Motel Matches	Release year: 1984; Label: Columbia	45	—	—
Barroom Roses	Release year: 1985; Label: Columbia	—	—	—
Keepin' It Country	Release year: 1986; Label: Columbia	—	—	—
You Haven't Heard the Last of Me	Release year: 1987; Label: Curb / MCA	10	—	—
No Regrets	Release year: 1988; Label: Curb	28	—	—
Many Mansions	Release year: 1989; Label: Curb	48	—	—
"—" denotes releases that did not chart

=== 1990s–2000s ===
Title	Album details
Picture in a Frame	Release year: 1995; Label: Intersound
Gospel Favorites	Release year: 1995; Label: Intersound
A Cowboy Christmas	Release year: 1996; Label: Intersound
Act Naturally	Release year: 1997; Label: Intersound
Too Old to Die Young	Release year: 2005; Label: Pegasus
Legendary Country	Release year: 2007; Label: Sweetsong Nashville
Lucky Me	Release year: 2016; Label: Bandy Productions
A Love Like That	Release year: 2020; Label: Bandy Productions
Thank You Lord	Release year: 2022; Label: Bandy Productions

== Compilation albums ==
Title	Album details	Peak positions
Title	Album details	US Country
The Best of Moe Bandy, Volume I	Release year: 1977; Label: Columbia	18
Encore	Release year: 1981; Label: Columbia	—
Greatest Hits (with Joe Stampley)	Release year: 1982; Label: Columbia	—
Greatest Hits	Release year: 1983; Label: Columbia	—
Greatest Hits	Release year: 1990; Label: Curb	—
Honky Tonk Amnesia: The Hard Country Sound of Moe Bandy	Release year: 1996; Label: Razor & Tie	—
Super Hits (with Joe Stampley)	Release year: 1999; Label: Columbia	—
"—" denotes releases that did not chart

== Live albums ==
Title	Album details
Live from Bad Bob's, Memphis (with Joe Stampley)	Release year: 1985; Label: Columbia
Live in Branson, MO USA	Release year: 1993; Label: LaserLight Digital
Live at Billy Bob's Texas (with Joe Stampley)	Release year: 2000; Label: Smith / Razor & Tie

== Singles ==
=== 1970s ===
Year	Single	Peak positions		Album
Year	Single	US Country	CAN Country	Album
1974	"I Just Started Hatin' Cheatin' Songs Today"	17	—	I Just Started Hatin' Cheatin' Songs
1974	"Honky Tonk Amnesia"	24	48	I Just Started Hatin' Cheatin' Songs
1974	"It Was Always So Easy (To Find an Unhappy Woman)"	7	7	It Was Always So Easy (To Find an Unhappy Woman)
1975	"Don't Anyone Make Love at Home Anymore"	13	24	It Was Always So Easy (To Find an Unhappy Woman)
1975	"Bandy the Rodeo Clown"	7	4	Bandy the Rodeo Clown
1975	"Hank Williams, You Wrote My Life"	2	3	Hank Williams You Wrote My Life
1976	"The Biggest Airport in the World"	27	22	Hank Williams You Wrote My Life
1976	"Here I Am Drunk Again"	11	13	Here I Am Drunk Again
1976	"She Took More Than Her Share"	11	—	Here I Am Drunk Again
1977	"I'm Sorry for You, My Friend"	9	9	I'm Sorry for You My Friend
1977	"Cowboys Ain't Supposed to Cry"	13	33	Cowboys Ain't Supposed to Cry
1977	"She Just Loved the Cheatin' Out of Me"	11	2	Cowboys Ain't Supposed to Cry
1978	"Soft Lights and Hard Country Music"	13	15	Soft Lights and Hard Country Music
1978	"That's What Makes the Juke Box Play"	11	10	Soft Lights and Hard Country Music
1978	"Two Lonely People"	7	4	Love Is What Life's All About
1979	"It's a Cheating Situation" (with Janie Fricke)	2	1	It's a Cheating Situation
1979	"Barstool Mountain"	9	21	It's a Cheating Situation
1979	"Just Good Ol' Boys" (with Joe Stampley)	1	8	Just Good Ol' Boys
1979	"I Cheated Me Right Out of You"	1	1	One of a Kind
1979	"Holding the Bag" (with Joe Stampley)	7	7	Just Good Ol' Boys
"—" denotes releases that did not chart

=== 1980s and 1990s ===
Year	Single	Peak positions		Album
Year	Single	US Country	CAN Country	Album
1980	"One of a Kind"	13	—	One of a Kind
1980	"Tell Ole I Ain't Here, He Better Get on Home" (with Joe Stampley)	11	15	Just Good Ol' Boys
1980	"The Champ"	22	14	The Champ
1980	"Yesterday Once More"	10	6	The Champ
1980	"Following the Feeling" (with Judy Bailey)	10	—	Following the Feeling
1981	"Hey Joe (Hey Moe)" (with Joe Stampley)	10	8	Hey Joe! Hey Moe!
1981	"My Woman Loves the Devil Out of Me"	15	25	Following the Feeling
1981	"Honky Tonk Queen" (with Joe Stampley)	12	11	Hey Joe! Hey Moe!
1981	"Rodeo Romeo"	10	12	Rodeo Romeo
1982	"Someday Soon"	21	36	Rodeo Romeo
1982	"She's Not Really Cheatin' (She's Just Gettin' Even)"	4	2	She's Not Really Cheatin' (She's Just Gettin' Even)
1982	"Only If There Is Another You"	12	42	She's Not Really Cheatin' (She's Just Gettin' Even)
1983	"I Still Love You in the Same Ol' Way"	19	—	I Still Love You in the Same Ol' Way
1983	"Let's Get Over Them Together" (with Becky Hobbs)	10	27	Devoted to Your Memory
1983	"You're Gonna Lose Her Like That"	34	38	Devoted to Your Memory
1984	"It Took a Lot of Drinkin' (To Get That Woman Over Me)"	31	—	Motel Matches
1984	"Where's the Dress" (with Joe Stampley)	8	8	The Good Ol' Boys — Alive and Well
1984	"Woman Your Love"	12	12	Motel Matches
1984	"The Boy's Night Out" (with Joe Stampley)	36	24	The Good Ol' Boys — Alive and Well
1985	"Daddy's Honky Tonk" (with Joe Stampley)	48	45	The Good Ol' Boys — Alive and Well
1985	"Still on a Roll" (with Joe Stampley)	58	—	The Good Ol' Boys — Alive and Well
1985	"Barroom Roses"	45	34	Barroom Roses
1985	"Can't Leave That Woman Alone"	—	—	Keepin' It Country
1986	"One Man Band"	42	43	You Haven't Heard the Last of Me
1987	"Till I'm Too Old to Die Young"	6	10	You Haven't Heard the Last of Me
1987	"You Haven't Heard the Last of Me"	11	—	You Haven't Heard the Last of Me
1988	"Americana"	8	—	No Regrets
1988	"Ashes in the Wind"	47	61	No Regrets
1988	"I Just Can't Say No to You"	21	—	No Regrets
1989	"Many Mansions"	34	—	Many Mansions
1989	"Brotherly Love"	53	—	Many Mansions
1989	"This Night Won't Last Forever"	49	—	Many Mansions
1990	"Pardon Me (Haven't We Loved Somewhere Before)" (with Becky Hobbs)	— (Note: "Pardon Me (Haven't We Loved Somewhere Before)" did not chart on Hot Country Songs, but peaked at number 3 on Hot Country Radio Breakouts.)	—	Greatest Hits (Curb)
1990	"Nobody Gets Off in This Town"	—	—	No Regrets
"—" denotes releases that did not chart

== Music videos ==
Year	Video
1979	"Just Good Ol' Boys" (with Joe Stampley)
1982	"Someday Soon"
1982	"She's Not Really Cheatin' (She's Just Gettin' Even)"
1984	"Where's the Dress" (with Joe Stampley)
1988	"Americana"
