= Nothing Sacred (album) =

Studio album by David Allan Coe
- Released: January 8, 1978
- Genre: Country; outlaw country; comedy
- Length: 32:31
- Label: DAC

David Allan Coe chronology
| Tattoo (1977) | Nothing Sacred (1978) | Family Album (1978) |

Nothing Sacred is the eleventh studio album by American country musician David Allan Coe. Released in 1978, it is Coe's fourth independent album, after Penitentiary Blues, Requiem for a Harlequin and Buckstone County Prison. Nothing Sacred was noted for its profane and sexually explicit lyrics, and was released solely by mail order.

== Background ==
In the late 1970s, Coe lived in Key West, Florida, and Shel Silverstein played his album Freakin' at the Freakers Ball for Coe, who proceeded to play a series of his own comedic songs. Silverstein encouraged him to record the songs, leading to the production of this album. Nothing Sacred was released as a mail order-only release, initially advertised in the back pages of the biker magazine Easyriders; another album of similar material, Underground Album, followed in 1982.

The lyrics of Nothing Sacred are profane and often sexually explicit and describe an orgy in Nashville's Centennial Park and sex with pornographic film star Linda Lovelace. The album also contains a song targeting Anita Bryant, a musician notable for her strong opposition to LGBT rights, specifically her fight to repeal an LGBT anti-discrimination ordinance in Miami-Dade County. In the song, bluntly titled "Fuck Aneta Briant" [sic], Coe calls out Bryant as being hypocritical for her opposition to the lifestyles of gay people, stating that "In fact Anita Bryant, some act just like you". Tyler Mahan Coe, David's son, said, "He had sex with men in prison. 'Fuck Aneta Bryant' [sic] is a vulgar gay rights anthem."

The album also has a song criticizing Jimmy Buffett in response to a feud between the two musicians at the time. Buffett had accused Coe of plagiarizing the melody of "Divers Do It Deeper" from Buffett's "Changes in Latitudes, Changes in Attitudes", stating "I would have sued him, but I didn't want to give Coe the pleasure of having his name in the paper." Coe wrote the song "Jimmy Buffett" in response, with Coe suggesting that he and Buffett "just both get drunk and screw".

== Reception ==
Professional ratings
Review scores
| Source | Rating |
|---|---|
| AllMusic | 3/5 stars |

The album was generally criticized as being profane and crude. Neil Strauss described the album's material as "among the most racist, misogynist, homophobic and obscene songs recorded by a popular songwriter." AllMusic, which did not have a review of the album, gave it three out of five stars.

== Track listing ==
All songs written by David Allan Coe, except for "Cum Stains on the Pillow (Where Your Sweet Head Used to Be)", which was written by Chinga Chavin.

1. "Nothing Sacred" - 3:50
2. "Pussy Whipped Again" - 3:29
3. "Cum Stains on the Pillow (Where Your Sweet Head Used to Be)" (Chavin) - 3:20
4. "Linda Lovelace" - 3:18
5. "Fuck Aneta Briant" [sic] - 2:42
6. "Jimmy Buffett" - 3:50
7. "3 Biggest Lies" - 2:04
8. "Whips and Things" - 3:59
9. "Rails" - 2:09
10. "Master Bation Blues" [sic] - 3:50
