= Hank Williams, You Wrote My Life =

Studio album by Moe Bandy
- Released: 1976
- Genre: Country
- Label: Columbia
- Producer: Ray Baker

Moe Bandy chronology
Bandy the Rodeo Clown (1975)	Hank Williams, You Wrote My Life (1976)	Here I Am Drunk Again (1976)

Hank Williams, You Wrote My Life is the fourth album by country singer Moe Bandy, recorded in 1975 and 1976 and released in 1976 on the Columbia label recorded at Columbia Recording Studio "B", Nashville, Tennessee.

== Track listing ==
1. "Hank Williams, You Wrote My Life" (Paul Craft) - 3:10
2. "I'm The Honky Tonk On Loser's Avenue" (Sanger D. Shafer) - 2:25
3. "Ring Around Rosie's Finger" (C. Smith/C. Manser) - 1:46
4. "The Lady's Got Pride" (Sanger D. Shafer) - 2:05
5. "You've Got A Lovin' Comin'" (R. Bowling) - 2:54
6. "The Biggest Airport In The World" (Sanger D. Shafer) - 2:21
7. "Hello Mary" (B. Bond) - 1:47
8. "The Hard Times" (E. Penney/T. Benjamin/H. Moffatt) - 2:51
9. "I Think I've Got A Love On For You" (Dallas Frazier/L. Lee) - 2:24
10. "I'm Not As Strong As I Used To Be" (K. P. Powell/D. Orender) - 2:33

== Musicians ==
- Bob Moore
- Lloyd Green (Courtesy of Monument Records)
- Ray Edenton
- Hargus "Pig" Robbins
- Bobby Thompson
- Kenny Malone
- Johnny Gimble
- Dave Kirby
- Charlie McCoy (Courtesy of Monument Records)
- Leo Jackson
- Weldon Myrick
- Jimmy Capps

== Backing ==
- The Jordanaires

== Production ==
- Sound Engineers - Lou Bradley & Ron Reynolds
- Photography - Jim McGuire
- Design - Bill Barnes

== Charts ==
Chart performance for Hank Williams, You Wrote My Life
Chart (1976)	Peak position
US Top Country Albums (Billboard)	13
