= The Mysterious Rhinestone Cowboy =

Studio album by David Allan Coe
- Released: June 1974
- Recorded: 1974
- Studios: Columbia Studio in Nashville, Pete's Place in Nashville
- Genre: Outlaw country
- Length: 39:08
- Label: Columbia Nashville
- Producer: Ron Bledsoe

David Allan Coe chronology
Requiem for a Harlequin (1973)	The Mysterious Rhinestone Cowboy (1974)	Once Upon a Rhyme (1975)

The Mysterious Rhinestone Cowboy is the third album of American singer David Allan Coe, and his first on Columbia Records. Released in 1974, it is his first release in the country music genre.

== Background ==
Early in 1970, Coe released his blues-oriented debut album, Penitentiary Blues, followed by a tour with Grand Funk Railroad. In October 1971, he signed as an exclusive writer with Pete and Rose Drake's publishing company Windows Publishing Company, Inc. in Nashville, Tennessee, where he remained until 1977. Although he developed a cult following with his performances, he was not able to develop any mainstream success, but other performers achieved charting success by recording songs Coe had written, including Billie Jo Spears' 1972 recording "Souvenirs & California Mem'rys" and Tanya Tucker's 1973 single "Would You Lay With Me (In a Field of Stone)," which was a number-one hit, and responsible for Coe becoming one of Nashville's hottest songwriters and Coe himself being signed by Columbia Records. Coe later explained to Kristofer Engelhardt of Review, “I didn't really care for some of the country music until people like Kris Kristofferson and some of those people started writing songs. They had a little more to say than just, “Oh baby I miss you,” or whatever. I don't do anything halfway. Once I got into country music I went back and researched it and learned everything there was to know about it. I could do impersonations of Roy Acuff, Ernest Tubb, Hank Snow, Marty Robbins, just about anybody. I knew just about all there was to know about country music.”

== Recording ==
Unlike Coe’s first two albums, his third showed full commitment to country music, and Coe would play a part in the evolution of what would become known as outlaw country. The Mysterious Rhinestone Cowboy was produced by Rod Bledsoe and boasted a coterie of Nashville’s top session musicians, including steel player Pete Drake, pianist Hargus “Pig” Robbins, and multi-instrumentalist Charlie McCoy. The album title refers to the gimmick Coe adopted several years before Glen Campbell had a hit with the song “Rhinestone Cowboy": dressing up in a rhinestone suit and wearing a lone ranger mask. The singer later recalled to Michael Buffalo Smith in 2004, “I guess I have to blame it on Mel Tillis. I met him when I first went to Nashville and he had an office down on Music Row. I was over there talking to him in his office and he opened up the closet to get something and he had a whole closet full of rhinestone suits. I just freaked out on that. He looked at me and said ‘You like that shit, I don’t even wear those, if you want ‘em take ‘em!’ He gave me those rhinestone suits and I wore them everywhere. Coe maintained the idea for the mask came from his father:

Then I got the mysterious rhinestone thing from my father. He asked me,”You know the only way that The Lone Ranger can go into town? I said, “No, I don’t know what you mean.” He said that he has to take his mask off. I thought, what is my dad talking about and trying to tell me? He said, “Well son, you have to wear a mask and then when you don’t want to be David Allan Coe you can take your mask off and go anywhere and not be like Elvis with people messin’ with you all the time.”

In his AllMusic review of the LP, Thom Jurek describes this album's performance style as alt-country, "pre-punk" and "a hillbilly version of Marc Bolan's glitz and glitter". Jurek credits Merle Haggard as a heavy influence on the album's music. and observes:

Opening with "A Sad Country Song," Coe displays his lyrical and melodic gift that comes out of the great Texas and Bakersfield traditions. Amid a whining pedal steel, shimmery fiddle, and a waltz tempo heard above the guitars, Coe sings to the lonely and alone and offers his brand of empathy this way: "Just look for my name on a jukebox/When you're tired of being alone/Put in a dime and I'll take the time/ To sing you a sad country song."

The Mysterious Rhinestone Cowboy sets the template for many of Coe's albums throughout the seventies: an eclectic mix of original compositions and occasional cover songs steeped in Coe's self-aggrandizing personae with lyrics that ranged from braggadocios to deeply sensitive. Typical of latter is the sentimental “River,” the story of a prisoner remembering his days fishing as a boy. (Coe can be seen performing the song in the 1975 film Heartworn Highways.) Similarly, in the prideful “I Still Sing the Old Songs,” the grandson of a Confederate soldier pays tribute to his grandfather with the lines:

I still sing the old songs that you taught me
And I still pray to Jesus now and then
And just like you I wish that he would save me
To see the day the south will rise again

The narrator also speaks of his father, who “wore his purple heart so proudly,” and his own “turn behind the gun,” presumably in Vietnam. This song is also performed by Coe in Heartworn Highways, and George Jones would cover the tune on his 1976 album The Battle.

The Mysterious Rhinestone Cowboy contains several cover songs by other like-minded songwriters who were beginning to push the barriers of conventional country music, such as Guy Clark (“Desperados Waiting for a Train”) and Mickey Newbury (“33rd of August”). Newbury in particular was a major influence on Coe, with Coe dedicating The Mysterious Rhinestone Cowboy to the Texas songwriter and including a letter to Newbury on the back cover, part of which observes, “Freedom is knowing how to remember the weight of your chains once they’ve been removed, for each man feels his own pain in prison and each man must pull his own time.”

== Reception ==
Professional ratings
Review scores
Source	Rating
Allmusic	4.5/5 stars

Allmusic reviewer Thom Jurek describes the album as being "as good as anybody at his best", writing "Coe displays his lyrical and melodic gift that comes out of the great Texas and Bakersfield traditions." Rolling Stone ranked it #40 on its “50 Country Albums Every Rock Fan Should Own” list, stating, “This major-label debut, which reflected a time when Coe wore rhinestone duds, wigs and a mask onstage while living in his car (a white hearse), posits him as a doomed, lonely troubadour of the lost-cause South (‘I Still Sing the Old Songs,’ ‘Old Man Tell Me,’ ‘The Old Grey Goose is Dead’). "A Sad Country Song" is a last-call classic; and "Atlanta Song" is a passive-aggressive stripper lament that Drake would feel."

== Track listing ==
All Songs written by David Allan Coe except where noted.

1. "Sad Country Song" – 2:27
2. "Crazy Mary" (Michael Peter Smith) – 4:04
3. "River" (Coe, Marty Yonts) – 2:50
4. "33rd of August" (Mickey Newbury) – 5:32
5. "Bossier City" (Bobby J. Bourgoin) – 4:03
6. "Atlanta Song" – 2:26
7. "Old Man Tell Me" (Coe, Buzz Rabin) – 3:12
8. "Desperados Waiting for a Train" (Guy Clark) – 5:37
9. "I Still Sing the Old Songs" – 4:14
10. "Old Grey Goose Is Dead" – (traditional) 4:43

== Personnel ==
- David Allan Coe – vocals
- Billy Sanford, Johnny Christopher, Tommy Allsup, John Goldthwaite, Ray Edenton – guitar
- Bobby Thompson – banjo, rhythm guitar
- Pete Drake, Lloyd Green – steel guitar
- Mike Leech, Henry Strzelecki – bass guitar
- Kenny Malone – drums
- Hargus "Pig" Robbins, Ron Oates – piano
- Buddy Spicher – violin, mandolin
- Charlie McCoy – harmonica, vibraphone
- Ron Bledsoe – production
- Doug Bartenfeld – guitar
