= I've Got Something to Say =

Studio album by David Allan Coe
- Released: June 1980
- Recorded: 1976
- Studio: Columbia Studios, Pete's Place in Nashville
- Genre: Country
- Length: 30:47
- Label: Columbia
- Producer: Billy Sherrill

David Allan Coe chronology
| Spectrum VII (1979) | I've Got Something to Say (1980) | Invictus (Means) Unconquered (1981) |

Professional ratings
Review scores
| Source | Rating |
|---|---|
| Allmusic | 2/5 stars |

I've Got Something to Say is an album released by country musician David Allan Coe. It was released in 1980 on Columbia. Guy Clark, Bill Anderson, Dickey Betts (from The Allman Brothers Band), Kris Kristofferson, Larry Jon Wilson, and George Jones are all featured on this album.

== Background ==
Although Coe had enjoyed great success as a songwriter and recorded high-quality albums since signing with Columbia in 1974, he had not broken through to the country music mainstream in the way other artists associated with outlaw country movement had. Coe could be his own worst enemy in this respect, alienating the mainstream by hanging out with biker gangs, recording an album of explicit songs, and falsely claiming he had been on death row for murder. Coe also became embroiled in a feud with pop star Jimmy Buffett, who accused Coe of plagiarising one of his songs. Coe often rubbed many of his peers the wrong way; according to Dan Beck, a Pittsburgh songwriter who was on the scene when Coe first came to Nashville, “In a way, we didn't necessarily take David that seriously. I remember songwriters used to go see him play someplace, and he'd play somebody else's songs and say he wrote it! People used to laugh.” Coe would go on to achieve success, but his last three singles of the 1970s did not chart, and he had not reached the country Top 30 since 1976 when “Longhaired Redneck" hit #17, as Nashville kept its distance from the tattooed country singer.

== Recording ==
With the dawn of a new decade, Coe and producer Billy Sherrill set out to reach a wider audience and bring Coe back to the charts by inviting other singers and musicians to take part in the sessions for what would become I’ve Got Something to Say. This collaborative spirit is evident in the song “Hank Williams Junior Junior,” a tribute to the only son of Hank Williams, who overcame his father's shadow and personal demons (including a disastrous fall off a Montana mountain in 1975) to emerge as one of country music's hottest stars. Like Coe, Hank Jr. aligned himself with the outlaw movement and embraced southern rock. The song was written by Bonnie Bramlett and Allman Brothers guitarist Dickey Betts, with Betts playing on the track and Kris Kristofferson on background vocals. Coe also takes another stab at southern rock with "I Could Never Give You Up (For Somebody Else),” an offering that is disparaged in Thom Jurek's AllMusic review as Coe “impersonating Leon Russell's singing voice and trying to make it a Southern rocker in the tradition of the Allmans, comes out sounding a hell of a lot more like Wet Willie.”

Billy Sherrill may have had a hand in corralling George Jones to sing on “This Bottle (In My Hand),” a song Coe wrote that sounds as if it was torn from the pages of Jones's mind. The legendary country singer was in the midst of having his career resurrected with the enormous success of “He Stopped Loving Her Today,” but was also still in the throes of a years-long cocaine-fuelled booze binge that saw him missing shows and acquiring the nickname “No Show Jones.” The opening verse tells the story of a hopeless alcoholic who appears intent on destroying himself:

Last week he spent his whole pay cheque on whiskey
And on Friday night he'll do it all again
He'll drink till he falls down and then he'll order one more round
And then go home with that bottle in his hand

Sherrill's production is straight hardcore honky tonk, and Coe holds his own with Jones, who delivers a typically stellar performance. (The pair wrote "Whole Lot of Lonesome" for Coe's 1978 LP Family Album.) Bill Anderson, who Coe later gave credit for being a true friend in the business, also makes a guest appearance, singing on his own composition “Get a Little Dirt on Your Hands,” while Larry Jon Wilson and Texas tunesmith Guy Clark join Coe on “Take It Easy Rider.” Four of the album's eleven songs are covers, including the love song “If You'll Hold the Ladder (I'll Climb to the Top)” and Bobby Braddock’s “The Great Nashville Railroad Disaster (A True Story),” the latter having a similar feel to Coe's later hit “The Ride.” “Back to Atlanta” recalls Coe's 1974 composition “Atlanta Song” but is more serious in tone, exploring the theme of adultery. (“I never should have stepped across love's Mason-Dixon line...”) The catchy title track is a humorous opener detailing the recent events in the narrator's life, including catching his wife with two other men and getting arrested for boarding a plane with a gun, while the closing track “Loving You Comes So Natural” is infused with a heavy gospel influence.

I've Got Something to Say also contains “Take This Job and Shove It Too," a sequel to Coe's composition “Take This Job and Shove It,” which had been an extraordinary success for fellow outlaw Johnny Paycheck in 1977. Although credited for the song, Coe became annoyed when his authorship was played down, especially by Paycheck himself, and his impetus for writing the song may have been to underline in the public's mind that he wrote it, or to simply exploit its popularity:

Yeah, I mean even when the guy died it said Johnny Paycheck “The Working Man’s Hero” and it didn’t say anything about me writing the song…I think it was on Johnny Carson, or Joey Bishop, one of those guys asked him who wrote the song and he said he didn’t know but it was “some guy in Nashville.” Then, on another show I heard him say that he got the idea from his grandfather for the song.

The album peaked at #66 on the country music albums chart. The single “Get a Little Dirt on Your Hands" was released as a single and made it to #46.

== Reception ==
Thom Jurek of AllMusic gives I've Got Something to Say two stars, opining "Despite his intention of issuing an album that would be very friendly to radio programmers and label promo men, I've Got Something to Say is the most disappointing and unfocused record Coe had made since Family Album...Only 'Take It Easy Rider,' with Clark and Larry Jon Wilson on vocals, comes off as honest. In other words, for the first time in his career, Coe didn't tell the truth - he had almost nothing to say here."

== Track listing ==
All Songs written by David Allan Coe except where noted.

1. "I've Got Something to Say" – 2:03
2. "Back to Atlanta" – 3:48
3. "I Could Never Give You Up (For Someone Else)" – 2:23
4. "Take It Easy Rider" (with Guy Clark & Larry Jon Wilson) – 2:40
5. "The Great Nashville Railroad Disaster (A True Story)" (Bobby Braddock, Rafe Van Hoy) – 3:05
6. "Hank Williams Junior-Junior" (with Dickey Betts & Kris Kristofferson) (Dickey Betts, Bonnie Bramlett) – 2:44
7. "Get a Little Dirt on Your Hands" (with Bill Anderson) (Bill Anderson) – 3:42
8. "If You'll Hold the Ladder (I'll Climb to the Top)" (Buzz Rabin, Sara Busby) – 2:39
9. "This Bottle (In My Hand)" (with George Jones) – 2:51
10. "Take This Job and Shove It Too" – 2:17
11. "Lovin' You Comes So Natural" (Coe, Curtis Buck, Jimmy Lancaster)

== Personnel ==
- Guy Clark, Bill Anderson, Dickey Betts, Kris Kristofferson, Larry Jon Wilson, George Jones – vocals
- Reggie Young, Ken Bell, Dickey Betts, Boomer Castleman – guitar
- Pete Drake, Dale Seigfreid – steel guitar
- Henry Strzelecki, Ron Bledsoe, Ralph Ezell – bass
- Kenny Malone, Owen Hale – drums
- Buddy Spicher – fiddle
- Steve Nathan, Chalmer Davis – piano, keyboards
- Jimmy English – banjo

== Chart performance ==
| Chart (1980) | Peak position |
|---|---|
| U.S. Billboard Top Country Albums | 66 |
