= Underground Album =

Studio album by David Allan Coe / The David Allan Coe Band
- Released: 1982
- Genre: Outlaw country; blues rock; comedy
- Length: 31:13
- Label: D.A.C.
- Producer: David Allan Coe

David Allan Coe chronology
D.A.C. (1982)	Underground Album (1982)	Castles in the Sand (1983)

Underground Album is the 21st studio album by American country musician David Allan Coe. Underground Album is Coe's follow-up to his 1978 comedy album Nothing Sacred.

== Background ==
The album's music and vocal style was similar to other country acts of the era, but the lyrics are unusually explicit. Coe intended the album as ribald satire, inspired by his friendship with Shel Silverstein who wrote the comedy album Freakin' at the Freakers Ball. As mainstream record labels would not release an album with such content, Underground Album was independently produced and recorded, and was not sold in stores. The album was available only through mail order via advertisements in the motorcycling magazine Easyriders, and in the merchandise stand at Coe's live performances.

The song "Nigger Fucker" was written from the perspective of segregationist George Wallace "finding out his wife left him for a Black man". The following track, "Coffee", depicts an interracial romance between David Allan Coe and a black woman.

== Reception ==
Professional ratings
Review scores
Source	Rating
AllMusic	3/5 stars

The album was little noticed in the mainstream until the songs began circulating on early file sharing websites, leading to a 2000 review from Neil Strauss in the New York Times. Strauss described the album's material as "among the most racist, misogynist, homophobic and obscene songs recorded by a popular songwriter." After Strauss, other commentators described the album as being profane, racist, and crude. AllMusic, which did not review the album, gave it three out of five stars.

The song "Nigger Fucker" resulted in Coe being accused of racism. It has also led to many of Johnny Rebel's songs being misattributed to David Allan Coe given that many of Johnny Rebel's songs also contained racial slurs in the titles.

Coe responded to the accusations by stating: "Anyone that hears this album and says I'm a racist is full of shit", and by noting the drummer in his band was Kerry Brown, a Black man and (Coe stated, erroneously) the son of musician Gatemouth Brown. Additionally, Coe has also noted he was friends with black singer Screamin' Jay Hawkins, who, he said, encouraged him in writing the songs for his first album Penitentiary Blues. Coe also objected to the fact that Strauss's article was published without the New York Times asking for his commentary. He contacted Strauss during the writing of the article, but Strauss only acknowledged talking to Coe's manager, who would only comment off the record.

== Track listing ==
All songs written by David Allan Coe.

1. "Rock n Roll Fever" - 3:10
2. "Panheads Forever" - 3:09
3. "Nigger Fucker" - 2:28
4. "Coffee" - 5:28
5. "One Monkey" - 3:14
6. "One More Time" - 3:13
7. "Little Sussie Shallow Throat" - 2:57
8. "Pick Em, Lick Em, Stick Em" - 2:56
9. "Don't Bite the Dick" - 2:27
10. "Fuckin' in the Butt" - 2:11
