= Rodeo Romeo =

Studio album by Moe Bandy
- Released: 1981
- Genre: Country
- Label: Columbia
- Producer: Ray Baker

Moe Bandy chronology
Following the Feeling (1980)	Rodeo Romeo (1981)	Encore (1981)

Rodeo Romeo is the 15th album by country singer Moe Bandy, released in 1981 on the Columbia label. It was recorded at Sound Emprium "B", CBS recording studio "A" and mastered at the CBS Recording Studio on the CBS DisComputer System, Nashville, TN. by M. C. Rather.

== Track listing ==
1. "Rodeo Romeo" (Dan Mitchell) - 2:52
2. "She's Playin' Hard To Forget" (Dan Mitchell) - 2:28
3. "You've Still Got It" (Christopher H.C. Blake, Bobby Fischer) - 2:26
4. "Daily Double" (Bob Morris, David W. Brewer) - 2:18
5. "I Wonder Where My Wanting You Will End" (Warren Robb, Shirl Milete) - 3:03
6. "Someday Soon" (Ian Tyson) - 3:07
7. "A Loser And A Fool" (Charlie Craig) - 2:13
8. "There's Nothing More Desperate (Than An Old Desperado)" (Dan Mitchell, Kent Blazy, Michael J. Masson) - 2:50
9. "The Photograph" (Jimmy Lee Anthony, Dearl F. Croft, Peggy White) - 2:40
10. "Recycling Memories" (Bobby Fischer, Christopher H.C. Blake) - 2:25

== Musicians ==
- David Briggs
- Leo Jackson
- Pete Wade
- Weldon Myrick
- Tommy Cogbill
- Ray Edenton
- Charlie McCoy
- Larrie Londin
- Henry Strzelecki
- Jerry Carrigan
- Jimmy Capps
- Leon Rhodes
- Jerry Kroon
- Hargus "Pig" Robbins
- Kenny Malone
- Johnny Gimble

== Backing ==
- The Jordanaires with Laverna Moore
- The Nashville Edition

== Charts ==
Chart performance for Rodeo Romeo
Chart (1981)	Peak position
US Top Country Albums (Billboard)	48
