= Invictus (Means) Unconquered =

Studio album by David Allan Coe
- Released: February 1981
- Recorded: 1980 at Columbia Studios in Nashville
- Genre: Country
- Length: 29:32
- Label: Columbia
- Producer: Billy Sherrill

David Allan Coe chronology
I've Got Something to Say (1980)	Invictus (Means) Unconquered (1981)	Tennessee Whiskey (1981)

Invictus (Means) Unconquered is an album released by country musician David Allan Coe. It was released in 1981 on Columbia.

== Recording ==
With its radio-friendly sound and guest duets, Coe's previous album I've Got Something to Say was an attempt to reach a wider country audience, and this process is continued on Invictus (Means) Unconquered, with producer Billy Sherrill couching the songs in tasteful instrumentation that put the spotlight squarely on Coe's voice. In his AllMusic review of the album, Thom Jurek calls the LP "arguably the finest album of his career" and singles out Coe's vocals for particular praise:

True to form, Coe has always been underrated as a singer, and nowhere is this more evident than on Invictus. His co-write with Guy and Susanna Clark on "Ain't It Funny How Love'll Do Ya" is one of the most convincing vocal performances Coe ever recorded, ranking with "Mona Lisa Lost Her Smile" and "Would You Lay with Me (In a Field of Stone)”…The conviction in his voice is so present, it almost cracks, but he never quite allows himself to lose control. These are the words of a man who has stared into the face of broken love's void and lived to tell about it.

Invitus is also noteworthy in that Coe only had a hand in writing just four of its ten songs, although considering the songwriter had produced ten albums of nearly all original material for Columbia in seven years, a creative dry spell was understandable. "A Boy Named Sue" songwriter Shel Silverstein contributes three songs, including "Someplace to Come When It Rains", which gets a sensitive reading from Coe, and the parting-of-the-ways tune "If You Ever Think of Me", which the pair composed together. They also collaborated with Karen Brooks on the lustful “The Best Game in Town,” and this song, along with the hopeful “As Far as This Feeling Will Take Us,” is sung by Coe and Brooks as duets in the classic George Jones-Tammy Wynette tradition. Coe wrote "Ain't It Funny the Way Love Can Do Ya" with songwriting couple Guy and Susanna Clark, and wrote the John Dillinger-inspired outlaw anthem “I Love Robbing Banks" with Guy Clark.

Whether prompted by commercial aspirations or not, the covers that Coe and Sherrill chose to fill out the album were inspired. The opener, "Rose Knows", is the classic cheating tale filled with the paranoia of a man dreading that his wife is suspicious of his trysts, while the Bobby David-Ray Kennedy tune "The Purple Heart", which Sherrill infuses with the classic "Ray Price shuffle", uses war as a metaphor to show the bitterness and heartbreak of a love gone sour. ("You put me out of action so many times before and left me on the battlefield to bleed...") Coe also covers the outlaw classic "London Homesick Blues", popularised by Jerry Jeff Walker, and, more curiously, the Tammy Wynette classic "Stand by Your Man". Coe plays it straight on the song, which was written by Wynette and Sherrill, and is heartfelt and moving, taking on a new meaning in a man's voice - more of a plea than a declaration. (This would be taken to the extreme the following year when the heavy metal band Motörhead and Wendy O. Williams would also cover the song.) Released as the album's single, Coe's "Stand by Your Man" reached No. 88 on the charts.

== Reception ==
Professional ratings
Review scores
Source	Rating
AllMusic	4/5 stars
The Rolling Stone Album Guide	1/5 stars

Like many Coe albums of this era, Invictus (Means) Unconquered was a mediocre commercial success, making it to No. 67 on the country albums chart.

AllMusic wrote: "From top to bottom, Invictus Means Unconquered towers above most country records not only of the era, but of all time. It's a quintessential example of everything country music can achieve when it is honest, true, and from the center of a broken heart."

== Track listing ==
1. "Rose Knows" (Don Goodman, Mary Ann Kennedy, Pam Rose) – 2:27
2. "Ain't It Funny the Way Love Can Do Ya" (Coe, Guy Clark, Susanna Clark) – 2:40
3. "If You Ever Think of Me at All" (Coe, Shel Silverstein) – 2:48
4. "The Purple Heart" (Bobby David, Ray Kennedy) – 3:11
5. "London Homesick Blues" (Gary P. Nunn) – 3:00
6. "Stand by Your Man" (Billy Sherrill, Tammy Wynette) – 3:27
7. "As Far as This Feeling Will Take Us" (with Karen Brooks) (Buzz Rabin, Flash Gordon) – 2:55
8. "Someplace to Come When It Rains" (Shel Silverstein) – 3:31
9. "The Best Game in Town" (with Karen Brooks) (Coe, Shel Silverstein, Karen Brooks) – 3:04
10. "I Love Robbing Banks" (Coe, Guy Clark) – 2:29

== Personnel ==
- David Allan Coe, Karen Brooks – vocals
- The Nashville Edition – background vocals
- Billy Sanford, Jimmy Capps, Tommy Allsup, Phil Baugh – guitar
- Pete Drake, Dale Seigfreid – steel guitar
- Henry Strzelecki, Joe Osborn – bass
- Kenny Malone, Jerry Carrigan – drums
- Hargus "Pig" Robbins – piano
- Farrell Morris – percussion
- Billy Sherrill – producer

== Chart performance ==
Chart (1981)	Peak position
U.S. Billboard Top Country Albums	67
