= Tattoo (David Allan Coe album) =

Studio album by David Allan Coe
- Released: August 1977
- Recorded: 1977
- Studio: Columbia (Nashville, Tennessee); Quadrafonic Sound (Nashville, Tennessee); Creative Workshop (Nashville, Tennessee)
- Genre: Country
- Length: 35:30
- Label: Columbia
- Producer: Ron Bledsoe

David Allan Coe chronology
Texas Moon (1977)	Tattoo (1977)	Nothing Sacred (1978)

Tattoo is an album by country musician David Allan Coe, released in 1977 on Columbia Records.

== Recording ==
After his previous outlaw movement-hitching concept album Rides Again (its opening track was titled “Willie, Waylon and Me” and was reprised halfway through the running order of crossfading songs), Coe returned to a straighter country approach on 1977’s Tattoo, the title a reference to Coe’s menacingly inked frame.

The Ohio-born Coe often wrote songs remembering childhood and family set all over the south, such as “Texas Lullaby” and “I Still Sing the Old Songs,” and sang them with such conviction that many listeners assumed they were autobiographical, although his reputation for exaggerating aspects of his own past - such as claiming he’d done time on death row for murder, a boast eventually disproven – did not adhere him to some critics and fellow musicians, who viewed Coe’s creative liberties as exploitative. A converse view, on the other hand, would be that Coe’s ability to carry off these songs so authentically speaks to one of his greatest strengths as a vocalist. “Daddy Was a God Fearin’ Man,” which is set in Harlan, Kentucky, is another one of these compositions where the narrator recalls visiting his grandfather as an eight-year-old boy and reminiscing about his father, who was a poor farmer and “could barely sign his name.” Although the set opens with the honky tonk bounce of “Just to Prove My Love to You,” most of Tattoo is dominated by contemplative ballads exploring traditional country themes, as noted by AllMusic critic Thom Jurek, who calls it “one of Coe's finest recordings -- it's full of love songs, divorce tunes, cheating songs, and rootsy, gutsy honky tonk playing by a stellar cast of musicians.”

Coe wrote or co-wrote most of the songs on the LP, such as “You’ll Always Live Inside of Me,’ a collaboration with Bobby Charles, which is a stone country song worthy of George Jones before breaking into a Ray Price shuffle on the chorus. (“Play it pretty,” Coe urges before the steel guitar break.) “Play Me a Sad Song,” is similar to the Tammy Wynette hit “Apartment No. 9” in structure, and even quotes the line “Loneliness surrounds me” on the chorus, while the regretful “Face to Face,” another Coe original, is a cry-in-your-beer tune that laments “Now it’s time to share the pain." Other songs on the album have more complex arrangements without sacrificing this country sound, largely because of Coe’s soulful delivery. As Jurek writes:

"Maria Is a Mystery" features some of the most haunting imagery in any Coe song, and he follows it with the amazing "Just in Time to Watch Love Die," before a deeply moving read of "Frisco Mabel Joy." The album closes with "Hey Gypsy," a dramatic, fully orchestrated plea for wanderers to return to a place of solace. It sounds like Coe is so haunted by these songs that he's looking directly into the depths of the mirror of his own soul.

Tattoo was Coe's third release of 1977 and would reach number 38 on the country music albums chart.

== Reception ==
Professional ratings
Review scores
Source	Rating
AllMusic	4.5/5 stars

AllMusic wrote: "This is easily one of the finest country records issued in the 1970s."

== Track listing ==
All songs written by David Allan Coe, except where noted.

1. "Just to Prove My Love for You" - 2:25
2. "Face to Face" - 2:33
3. "You'll Always Live Inside Me" (Coe, Bobby Charles) - 4:04
4. "Play Me a Sad Song" - 3:34
5. "Daddy Was a God Fearin' Man" - 4:09
6. "Canteen of Water" (Jay Bolotin) - 4:23
7. "Maria Is a Mystery" (Coe, Bolotin) - 3:32
8. "Just in Time (To Watch Love Die)" (Coe, Jimmy Townsend) - 3:15
9. "San Francisco Mable Joy" (Mickey Newbury) - 5:13
10. "Hey Gypsy" (Coe, Fred Spears) - 2:22

== Personnel ==
- David Allan Coe, The Nashville Edition - vocals
- Billy Sanford, John Christopher, Tommy Allsup, Reggie Young - guitar
- Lloyd Green, Weldon Myrick - steel guitar
- Mike Leech, Henry Strzelecki, Ted Reynolds, Ron Bledsoe - bass guitar
- Kenny Malone, Ralph Gallant, Buster Phillips - drums
- Hargus "Pig" Robbins, Ron Oates - piano
- Buddy Spicher - violin
- Billy Sherrill, Ron Bledsoe - production
