= Compass point =

Compass point may refer to:

- Cardinal direction, north, south, east or west
- Points of the compass or compass point, a direction on a traditional compass
- Compass Point (album)
- Compass Point Shopping Centre, now known as Compass One, a shopping mall in Singapore
- Compass Point Studios, a studio in Nassau, Bahamas
