= C. B. Savage =

Single by Rod Hart

from the album Breakeroo!
- B-side: "Better Off Gone"
- Released: December 1976
- Genre: Country
- Length: 3:29
- Label: Plantation
- Songwriter: Rod S. Hart

"C. B. Savage" is a gay-themed novelty country song by the American singer-songwriter Rod Hart, from his album Breakeroo!. It peaked at #67 on the Billboard Hot 100, giving him his only entry on that chart. It was also the first of only three songs with the title "Savage", along with "Savage" by Megan Thee Stallion and Beyonce and "Savage Love" by Jason Derulo and Jawsh 685.

The song is a gay answer to C. W. McCall's hit, "Convoy."

== Charts ==
Chart (1976–77)	Peak position
Canada RPM Top Singles	87
Canada Country (RPM)	10
US Billboard Hot 100	67
US Hot Country Songs (Billboard)	23
US Cash Box Top 100	59
