= Human Emotions =

Studio album by David Allan Coe
- Released: December 1978
- Recorded: 1978
- Studio: Columbia Studio, Pete's Place in Nashville
- Genre: Country
- Length: 32:20
- Label: Columbia
- Producer: Billy Sherrill

David Allan Coe chronology
| Family Album (1978) | Human Emotions (1978) | Spectrum VII (1979) |

Human Emotions is an album by country musician David Allan Coe. It was released in 1978 on Columbia.

== Recording ==
The original vinyl release of Human Emotions is divided into two parts, Happy Side and Su-I-Side (with side one filled with songs composed by Coe and some recorded before another wife left him) and side two focusing on the aftermath, with the tunes connected by the sound of beach waves. The album features Billy Sherrill's debut as Coe's producer, with Thom Jurek noting in his AllMusic review of the album:

At this time, producer Billy Sherrill had really begun to make his presence felt on David Allan Coe's records. Ron Bledsoe is still here with his patented honky tonk production style, but the Sherrill ambience creeps in here and gives everything a certain commercial-sounding fullness rather than the space of his earlier records…The album opens with a re-recording of "Would You Lay With Me (In a Field of Stone)," a track Sherrill convinced Coe to redo. This version is not as strong, perhaps because it comes from a place of brokenness rather than the ecstatic font of new love, but it is still an elegant and powerful tome.

In keeping with the theme, side one offers brighter cuts, such as the promising new love of “If This Is Just a Game,” which boasted a commercial sound that became a minor hit for Coe, reaching #45, his highest charting single since “Willie, Waylon, and Me” hit #25 in 1976. “Mississippi River Queen” is a travelogue of outlaw machismo cut from the same cloth as Waylon Jennings' “I'm a Ramblin’ Man." The catchy “You Can Count on Me” is a song of utter devotion, while the optimistic “Tomorrow Is Another Day” returns to the Jimmy Buffett sound Coe had mined on his previous song “Divers Do It Deeper.” Side two, the Su-I-Side collection, begins with what AllMusic calls “a masterpiece, with its syncopated vocal lead lines, country-waltz tempo, and huge backing chorus.” From there, the story descends into a cheating, drunken abyss. “She Finally Crossed Over (Love's Cheating Line)” is a bitter study in self-pity and betrayal (“My best friend loved her right out of my mind...”), and the down-and-out barroom anthem “Jack Daniels, If You Please” would become one of Coe's more popular songs. Another drinking song, “Whiskey and Women,” features Janie Frickie on background vocals. The album closes with the southern rock boogie of “Suicide,” its riotous groove at odds with the foreboding lyrics.

== Reception ==
Professional ratings
Review scores
| Source | Rating |
|---|---|
| AllMusic | 4/5 stars |
| The Rolling Stone Album Guide | 2/5 stars |

Human Emotions peaked at No. 45 on the country albums chart. AllMusic called it "one of Coe's better efforts in the 1970s.”

== Track listing ==
All Songs written by David Allan Coe.

=== Happy Side ===
1. "Would You Lay with Me (In a Field of Stone)" – 2:54
2. "If This Is Just a Game" – 3:29
3. "You Can Count on Me" – 2:40
4. "Mississippi River Queen" – 2:32
5. "Tomorrow Is Another Day" – 2:42

=== Su-I-Side ===
1. "Human Emotions" – 4:28
2. "(She Finally Crossed Over) Love's Cheating Line" – 4:07
3. "Whiskey and Women" – 2:34
4. "Jack Daniels If You Please" – 3:17
5. "Suicide" – 3:37

== Personnel ==
- David Allan Coe, The Nashville Edition, Janie Fricke, Pam Rose, Billy Sherrill – vocals
- Tommy Allsup, Reggie Young, Jimmy Capps, Phil Baugh, Wesley Taylor – guitar
- Lloyd Green, Pete Drake, Dale Seigfreid – steel guitar
- Henry Strzelecki, Ron Bledsoe, Alan Hicks – bass
- Kenny Malone, Jerry Carrigan, James Isbell – drums
- Hargus "Pig" Robbins – piano
- Farrell Morris – percussion
- Billy Sherrill – producer
