= Soft Lights and Hard Country Music =

Studio album by Moe Bandy
- Released: 1978
- Genre: Country
- Length: 27:53
- Label: Columbia
- Producer: Ray Baker

Moe Bandy chronology
| Cowboys Ain't Supposed to Cry (1977) | Soft Lights and Hard Country Music (1978) | Love Is What Life's All About (1978) |

Soft Lights and Hard Country Music is an album by country singer Moe Bandy, released in 1978. It was recorded at CBS Recording Studio "B", Nashville, Tennessee. It peaked at No. 34 on Billboard's Top Country Albums chart.

== Critical reception ==
Professional ratings
Review scores
| Source | Rating |
|---|---|
| AllMusic | 4/5 stars |

The Chicago Tribune deemed the album "another good snort of his beer-drinking music." The Fort Worth Star-Telegram considered it "archetypical country music, and it's good."

== Track listing ==
1. "Soft Lights and Hard Country Music" (Sanger D. Shafer) - 2:50
2. "Darling, Will You Marry Me Again" (Sanger D. Shafer, Warren Robb) - 2:50
3. "Paper Chains" (Steve Collom) - 2:42
4. "This Haunted House" (Sanger D. Shafer, Arthur Leo "Doodle" Owens) - 2:39
5. "If She Keeps Loving Me" (Glenn Martin) - 2:53
6. "That's What Makes the Juke Box Play" (Jimmy Work) - 2:40
7. "There's Nobody Home on the Range Anymore" (Ed Penney, Robert Shaw Parsons) - 2:54
8. "Are We Making Love or Just Making Friends" (Steve Collom) - 2:50
9. "A Wound Time Can't Erase" (Bill D. Johnson) - 2:46
10. "A Baby and a Sewing Machine" (Ken McDuffie) - 2:49

== Musicians ==
- Charlie McCoy (Courtesy of Monument Records)
- Hargus "Pig" Robbins (Courtesy of Elektra Records)
- Johnny Gimble
- Weldon Myrick
- Ray Edenton
- Bunky Keels
- Dave Kirby
- Kenny Malone
- Bob Moore
- Leo Jackson
- Reggie Young
- Tommy Allsup

Backing

- The Jordanaires

Production

- Sound engineers – Lou Bradley, Ron Reynolds
- Photography – Jim McGuire
- Album design – Bill Barnes
- Illustration – Gene Wilkes

== Charts ==
| Chart (1978) | Peak position |
|---|---|
| US Top Country Albums | 34 |
