= Bandy the Rodeo Clown =

Studio album by Moe Bandy
- Released: 1975
- Genre: Country
- Length: 24:46
- Label: GRC
- Producer: Ray Baker

Moe Bandy chronology
| It Was Always So Easy (1974) | Bandy the Rodeo Clown (1975) | Hank Williams, You Wrote My Life (1976) |

Professional ratings
Review scores
| Source | Rating |
|---|---|
| Christgau's Record Guide | B |

Bandy the Rodeo Clown is the third album by country singer Moe Bandy, released in 1975 on the GRC label.

== Track listing ==
1. "Bandy the Rodeo Clown" (Sanger D. Shafer, Lefty Frizzell) - 2:52
2. "Somewhere There's a Woman" (Rex Gosdin, Les Reed) - 3:01
3. "Give Me Liberty (Or Give Me All Your Love)" (Dallas Frazier) - 2:44
4. "Nobody's Waiting For Me" (Sanger D. Shafer, Warren Robb) - 2:35
5. "I Stop And Get Up (To Go Out Of My Mind)" (Paul Huffman, Joan'e Keller) - 2:02
6. "Oh, Lonesome Me" (Don Gibson) - 2:40
7. "I Sure Don't Need That Memory Tonight" (Eddy Raven) - 2:05
8. "Fais Do-Do" (Eddy Raven) - 2:13
9. "Goodbye On Your Mind" (Eddy Raven) - 1:56
10. "Signs Of A Woman Gone" (Rex Gosdin, Les Reed) - 2:38

== Musicians ==
- Charlie McCoy
- Bobby Thompson
- Bob Moore
- Hargus "Pig" Robbins
- Leo Jackson
- Jimmy Capps
- Johnny Gimble
- Kenny Malone
- Weldon Myrick
- Dave Kirby

=== Backing vocals ===
The Jordanaires with Laverna Moore

== Production ==
- Sound engineers- Lou Bradley
- Photography - Barry McClintock
- Album design - Ruby Mazur

== Charts ==
Chart performance for Bandy the Rodeo Clown
| Chart (1975) | Peak position |
|---|---|
| US Top Country Albums (Billboard) | 27 |
