= Following the Feeling =

Studio album by Moe Bandy
- Released: 1980
- Genre: Country
- Label: Columbia
- Producer: Ray Baker

Moe Bandy chronology
The Champ (1980)	Following the Feeling (1980)	Rodeo Romeo (1981)

Following the Feeling is the 14th album by country singer Moe Bandy, released in 1980 on the Columbia label.

== Track listing ==
1. "Following The Feeling*" (Charlie Craig) - 2:54
2. "Today I Almost Stopped Loving You" (Dan Mitchell) - 2:32
3. "Would You Mind If I Just Call You Julie" (Warren Robb, Shirl Milete) - 2:56
4. "Mexico Winter" (Buck Moore, Jim Mundy) - 2:55
5. "Liquor Emotion" (Moe Bandy, R. Hill) - 2:49
6. "My Woman Loves The Devil Out of Me" (B. P. Barker) - 2:45
7. "It's You And Me Again*" (D. Mitchell, J. McCollum) - 2:25
8. "I've Got Your Love All Over Me" (M. Lane) - 2:30
9. "If I Lay Down The Bottle, Would You Lay Back Down With Me" (Warren Robb, Dave Kirby) - 3:16
10. "It's Better Than Being Alone" (E. Penney) - 2:36

* Featuring Judy Bailey

== Musicians ==
- Bob Moore
- Kenny Malone
- Buddy Harman
- Leo Jackson
- Ray Edenton
- Chip Young
- Weldon Myrick
- Jimmy Capps
- Pete Wade
- Charlie McCoy
- Johnny Gimble
- Hargus "Pig" Robbins
- Tommy Allsup
- Henry Strzelecki
- Dave Kirby
- Leon Rhodes
- Bob Wray
- Ricky Skaggs

== Backing ==
- The Jordanaires with Laverna Moore
- The Nashville Edition

== Production ==
- Sound engineers - Ron Reynolds, Billy Sherrill, Lou Bradley
- Photography - Alan Messer
- Art direction & design - Virginia Team & Bill Johnson

== Charts ==
Chart performance for Following the Feeling
Chart (1980)	Peak position
US Top Country Albums (Billboard)	44
