= It's a Cheating Situation (album) =

Studio album by Moe Bandy
- Released: 1979
- Studio: Jack Clement Recording (Nashville, Tennessee); CBS (Nashville, Tennessee)
- Genre: Country
- Label: Columbia
- Producer: Ray Baker

Moe Bandy chronology
| Love Is What Life's All About (1978) | It's a Cheating Situation (1979) | One of a Kind (1979) |

It's a Cheating Situation is the 11th album by country singer Moe Bandy. It was released in 1979 on the Columbia label recorded at the Jack Clement Recording Studio "B" (Engineer Billy Sherrill) and CBS Recording Studios Nashville, Tennessee (Engineer Ron Reynolds).

== Track listing ==
1. "It's a Cheating Situation" (with Janie Fricke) (Curly Putman, Sonny Throckmorton) - 2:39
2. "Barstool Mountain" (Donn Tankersley, Wayne Carson Thompson) - 2:42
3. "Cheaters Never Win" (Sanger D. Shafer, Arthur Leo "Doodle" Owens) - 2:28
4. "Conscience Where Were You (When I Needed You Last Night)" (Sanger D. Shafer, Warren Robb) - 2:44
5. "Try My Love On for Size" (Herb McCollough) - 2:15
6. "To Cheat Or Not To Cheat" (Bobby P. Barker) - 3:24
7. "She Stays In The Name of Love" (Max D. Barnes) - 2:32
8. "It Just Helps To Keep The Hurt From Hurtin'" (Cindy Walker) - 2:50
9. "When My Working Girl Comes Home (And Works on Me)" (Carl Belew, Van Givens) - 2:37
10. "They Haven't Made The Drink (That Can Get Me Over You)" (Sanger D. Shafer, Arthur Leo "Doodle" Owens) - 2:37

== Musicians ==
- Bob Moore
- Johnny Gimble
- Hargus "Pig" Robbins (Courtesy of Elektra Records)
- Bobby Thompson
- Weldon Myrick
- Leo Jackson
- Jerry Carrigan
- Reggie Young
- Charlie McCoy (Courtesy of Monument Records)
- Tommy Allsup
- Jimmy Capps
- Kenny Malone
- Tommy Jackson
- Ray Edenton

== Backing ==
The Jordanaires with Janie Fricke.

== Production ==
- Sound engineers - Ron Reynolds, Billy Sherrill
- Photography - Clark Thomas

== Charts ==
Chart performance for It's a Cheating Situation
| Chart (1979) | Peak position |
|---|---|
| US Top Country Albums (Billboard) | 19 |
