= D.A.C. (album) =

Studio album by David Allan Coe
- Released: 1982
- Studios: CBS Studios, Nashville
- Genre: Country
- Label: Columbia
- Producer: Billy Sherrill

David Allan Coe chronology
Rough Rider (1981)	D.A.C. (1982)	Underground Album (1982)

D.A.C is an album released by country musician David Allan Coe. It was released in 1982 on Columbia.

== Recording ==
As on previous releases such as Human Emotions and Spectrum VII, the original D.A.C. LP was split into two parts, in this case a Thinking Side and a Drinking Side. Judging by the subject matter on Thinking Side, Coe's personal life could not have been pleasant at this time, with every song dealing with crumbling relationships, loss and betrayal. The first two songs, “Looking in the Mirror” and “Lyin’ Comes So Easy to Your Lips” explore the theme of adultery, with Coe crooning “Cheating drips right off your fingertips” on the latter, while on “The Last Time She’ll Leave Me This Time” Coe indulges in wordplay as another love goes south. On “Voices,” a duet with Lea Jane Berinati, the jilted male lover has no sympathy for the woman begging his forgiveness, as Coe sings “You broke your promise and left me with a lie.” AllMusic writer Thom Jurek deems the collection “some of Coe's bitterest, most accusatory breakup songs…” The mood picks up considerably on Drinking Side with “She Loved the Leavin’ Out of Me,” another one of Coe’s Jimmy Buffett-style recordings, and Coe dedicates “Whiskey, Whiskey (Take My Mind)” to Buffett, a surprise considering the two feuded after Buffet accused Coe of plagiarism years before. In contrast to the vitriol spewed on side one, “I’ll Never Regret Loving You” strikes a conciliatory tone of weary resignation with such lines as “You take the heartaches and I’ll take the blame.”

Since the decade began, Coe and producer Billy Sherrill did their best to widen Coe's audience and appeal to country mainstream country radio in a number of ways, such as using outside writers and inviting guests to record duets, but success remained elusive. Coe's highest-charting single during this period was "Get a Little Dirt on Your Hands," a duet with Bill Anderson, which peaked at #45. As if aware of the compromises he had been making, Coe chose to close out D.A.C. with a suite of three songs that contained a short prologue:

”Makin’ records is, uh, somethin that’s kind of hard for me to do because I’m an entertainer. So I made my mind up a few albums ago that I was gonna do so many songs for the record company and so many for myself...We’ve turned the lights down low in the studio and the musicians have thrown away their little cheat sheets. So this is for all you David Allan Coe fans that’s been with me for a long time who didn’t really care if I got played on the radio or not.”

After that Coe breaks into “It’s a Sad Situation,” which returns to the despairing mood of side one as he sings “While searching for heaven our love went to hell,” and continues with a tone of self-pity on “Those Low Down Blues” and the boozy closing track.

== Reception ==
Although it did not chart, AllMusic describes D.A.C. as "a stunner."

== Track listing ==
All Songs written by David Allan Coe.

=== Thinking Side ===
1. "Looking in the Mirror"
2. "Lyin' Comes So Easy to Your Lips"
3. "The Last Time She'll Leave Me This Time"
4. "I Gave Up (On Trying to Get Over You)"
5. "Voices"

=== Drinking Side ===
1. "She Loved the Leaving Out of Me"
2. "I'll Never Regret Loving You"
3. "It's a Sad Situation"
4. "Those Low Down Blues"
5. "Whiskey, Whiskey (Take My Mind)"

== Personnel ==
- David Allan Coe, The Nashville Edition - vocals
- Bob Wray - bass
- Kenny Malone - drums
- Warren Haynes, Pete Bordonali - lead guitar
- Terry McMillan - percussion
- Bobby Emmons, Hargus Robbins, Bobby Wood - piano
- Billy Sanford - rhythm guitar
- David Allan Coe - rhythm guitar, vibes
- Pete Drake - steel guitar
- Lea Jane Berinati - vocals (on "Voices")
