= Tennessee Whiskey (album) =

Studio album by David Allan Coe
- Released: 1981
- Recorded: 1980–1981
- Genre: Country
- Label: Columbia
- Producer: Billy Sherrill

David Allan Coe chronology
Invictus (Means) Unconquered (1981)	Tennessee Whiskey (1981)	Rough Rider (1982)

Tennessee Whiskey is a 1981 album by country singer David Allan Coe.

== Background ==
By 1981, the outlaw country movement waned as the slicker "urban cowboy" era took hold in country music, typified by Johnny Lee's hit "Lookin' for Love", which critic Kurt Wolff panned the song as an example of "watered-down cowboy music." Coe was an important figure in the outlaw country genre, but judging by the sound of his recordings from this period, he had no interest in the trendy urban cowboy phase. (He would, however, invite Lee to contribute to Tennessee Whiskey.) Refusing to give into the flavor-of-the-month generic country "talent", Coe stuck to what he knew and sharpened the edges. Like his first two LPs of the 1980s, I've Got Something to Say and Invictus (Means) Unconquered, Tennessee Whiskey had a more polished sound but were firmly rooted in a pure country sound.

== Recording ==
The title track was released as a single and peaked at No. 77 on the country singles chart. Producer Billy Sherrill had better luck when he cut the song with George Jones in 1983 and saw it rise to No. 2. Ironically, Jones's version was slightly sweeter, with background singers and a string arrangement, compared to the stripped down version Coe recorded, which emphasised the singer’s vocal and an acoustic guitar. As on his previous two LPs, Coe relied more on outside writers, but managed to write half the songs himself. "If I Knew" is another in a long line of catchy country tunes with breezy hooks Coe seemed able to write so effortlessly, and is augmented with a banjo near the end, giving the song an Appalachian flavour. Similarly, "Little Orphan Annie" is a ballad-turned-bluegrass orgy. The many-times divorced Coe also ruminates on relationship woes on two songs: "I'll Always Be a Fool for You" reveals the weariness that comes with a toxic relationship, while "I've Given 'Bout All I Can Take" expresses frustration at a lover who fears commitment ("You've got a heart that won't let it come through…")

Coe covers two classics on the LP. The first is a heartfelt rendition of "Pledging My Love" and includes a spoken introduction where Coe recalls being in the Boys Industrial School in Lancaster, Ohio, in the 1950s when a guard told him that his favourite singer, Johnny Ace, had committed suicide. "I've always wanted to sing that song," Coe says wistfully, "but I was never able to. I think after all these years I'd like to try…" The second cover is "Dock of the Bay" by Otis Redding. Coe's version is more upbeat than the original. In his AllMusic review of the album, writer Thom Jurek is effusive in his praise for the vocal performance:

The most eclectic and risky track on the set is a cover of Otis Redding's "Dock of the Bay." Many have tried and almost no one has succeeded with this one, but Coe's read is immediate, deep, and soulful in a restless country way. Anyone who ever doubted his ability to interpret a classic tune should give this one a listen because, frankly, it'll blow your mind.

The album features two duets, the first with Terry McMillan on "We Got a Bad Thing Goin'" and the second with John Hartford on the "D-R-U-N-K".

== Reception ==
Tennessee Whiskey did not crack the country albums chart. AllMusic said "Coming on the heels of the brilliant Invictus Means Unconquered in 1980, Tennessee Whiskey from 1981 is another strong David Allan Coe outing, full of interesting song choices and hard country performances à la Merle Haggard and George Jones."

== Track listing ==
1. "Tennessee Whiskey", with Johnny Lee (Dean Dillon/Linda Hargrove) (2:59)
2. "If I Knew" (2:29) (David Allan Coe)
3. "I've Given 'Bout All I Can Take" (2:46) (David Allan Coe)
4. "Pledging My Love" (Don Robey/Ferdinand Washington) (3:52)
5. "I'll Always Be a Fool for You" (3:04) (David Allan Coe)
6. "(Sittin' On) The Dock of the Bay" (Otis Redding/Steve Cropper) (2:37)
7. "Juanita" (Fred Koller/Shel Silverstein) (3:30)
8. "We Got a Bad Thing Goin'", with Karen Brooks (2:51) (David Allan Coe)
9. "D-R-U-N-K", with John Hartford (Tim DuBois/Larry Paxton) (2:34)
10. "Little Orphan Annie", with John Hartford (3:57) (David Allan Coe)

== Personnel ==
- Guitar: Pete Bordonali, Jimmy Capps, Warren Haynes, Billy Sanford.
  Steel Guitar: Pete Drake, Dale Seigfreid. Banjo: John Hartford
- Bass: Joe Osborn, Bob Wray
- Keyboards: Hargus "Pig" Robbins
- Drums: Jerry Carrigan, Jerry Kroon
- Harmonica – Terry McMillan
- Fiddle: John Hartford
- Backing Vocals – Lea Jane Berinati, Dolores Edgin, Louis Dean Nunley,
  Rita Remington, Karen Taylor
