= Plantation Records =

American record label; imprint of The Shelby Singleton Corporation

Plantation Records was a country music record label of the 1960s and 1970s helmed by Shelby Singleton. The label is best known for Jeannie C. Riley's 1968 hit "Harper Valley PTA", which topped both the country and Billboard Hot 100 charts.

The label established Riley as one of the major country female vocalists of the late 1960s and early 1970s with a string of hits for the label and also topping the Billboard country album chart with the Harper Valley PTA album. Grand Ole Opry star Ray Pillow had light success on the label with one top 40 country hit in 1969. David Allan Coe's first two albums were on the Plantation label; Penitentiary Blues and Requiem for a Harlequin, before moving on to a major recording career at Columbia Records. Linda Martell became the first African-American female vocalist to record specifically for the country market, enjoying two top 40 country hits on Plantation in 1969–70 including the second hit version of "Before The Next Teardrop Falls" which peaked at No. 33. Martell later left the label citing her belief that Singleton's choosing of the name Plantation Records was racist (although he denied this) and his decision to focus on Riley's career at the expense of hers. Additionally, she explained that, when she attempted to sign to other record labels, something that was permitted as she had fulfilled her one year contract with Plantation, Singleton threatened to sue the record companies, causing her to be blackballed from country music and forcing her into complete retirement from the music industry. Other artists on Plantation included Harlow Wilcox and Dee Mullins.

After Riley left in 1972, the label's prominence declined, but it survived into the early 1980s. In the late 1970s the label signed a number of veteran country performers to the label including Webb Pierce, Jimmie Davis, Jimmy C. Newman, Hank Locklin, Charlie Walker, Dave Dudley, Leroy Van Dyke, Patti Page, and Roy Drusky though few of these records charted. Broadway star Carol Channing also recorded two albums for the label in duet performances with Pierce, Newman, and Locklin.

Singleton established at least two other labels (SSS International and Amazon), and helped comedian Bill Cosby form a short-lived label, Tetragrammaton Records, in the late 1960s. He purchased Sun Records from Sam Phillips in 1969.

== Other notable Plantation records ==
- PL 28 Harlow Wilcox & the Oakies – "Groovy Grubworm" / "Moose Trot"
- PL 43 Clark Bentley – "The Ballad of Archie Who?" / "One Way Tracks"
- PL 58 Robbie Harden – "Still Wanting You" / "The Service"
- PL 62 Col. Tex Herring, Auctioneer and Johnny Moore (Vocal) – "Sold to the Highest Bidder" / "Sold to the Highest Bidder"
- PL 73 C. Company featuring Terry Nelson – "Battle Hymn of Lt. Calley"
- PL 100 Sandy Cooper "Sweetheart"/"The Simple Way of Living"
- PL 144 Rod Hart – "C.B. Savage"/"Better Off Gone"
- PL 211 Scott and Susan - "The Elf Who's King of Country"

David Allan Coe's first two albums were also on Plantation label: Penitentiary Blues and Requiem for a Harlequin.

== See also ==
- List of record labels
