= Compass Point (album) =

Studio album by David Allan Coe
- Released: October 1979
- Recorded: 1979
- Studios: Compass Point Studios, Nassau, Bahamas
- Genre: Country
- Length: 28:50
- Label: Columbia
- Producers: Billy Sherrill, Ron Bledsoe

David Allan Coe chronology
Spectrum VII (1978)	Compass Point (1979)	I've Got Something to Say (1980)

Professional ratings
Review scores
Source	Rating
Allmusic	4/5 stars

Compass Point is an album released by country musician David Allan Coe. It was released in 1979 on Columbia.

== Recording ==
Coe closed out the decade with his ninth album for Columbia. The songs, all Coe originals, sequence into the next, which was becoming a hallmark on his records. It was produced again by the team of Ron Bledsoe and Billy Sherrill. Thom Jurek of AllMusic contends, “With Bledsoe's gritty, in-your-face, performance-based approach and Sherrill's polish and sense of space and texture, they were able to balance all of the inherent contradictions in Coe's music, from the gorgeous balladry of ‘Gone,’ ‘Heads or Tails,’ and the elaborately arranged dark honky tonk of ‘Merle and Me’ (not Haggard) to the rocking bluegrass stomp of ‘Honey Don't’ and the boozy Tex-Mex swagger of ‘Lost.’”

Musically, several of the songs on Compass Point look to the Caribbean, with shuffling back-beats and breezy rhythms, such as on “Loving Her (Will Make You Lose Your Mind)” and the tongue-twisting closing track. Lyrically, Coe covers some of his favourite themes, such as crime and prison on “Three Time Loser” and “Merle and Me,” tunes that echo Coe’s own youth spent in jail and youth reformatories. “Honey Don’t” sounds like Coe striking back at anyone who would dare question his musical credentials (“I’ve been a roadie for Satan, honey/I was the sound man for the Devil…”) and includes the repeated line “Honey don’t you pull that shit on me,” a rare expletive on a major label country record at the time. Opener “Heads or Tails” ruminates on the chance nature of romance, with Coe singing the title in a Johnny Cash drawl.

== Reception ==
AllMusic: "As a coda to a decade that went by in a blur of fame, success, madness, tragedy, and disappointment, Coe left it on a very high note with an album that looked brightly to the future."

== Track listing ==
All Songs written by David Allan Coe.

1. "Heads or Tails" – 2:04
2. "3 Time Loser" – 2:05
3. "Gone (Like)" – 6:26
4. "Honey Don't" – 2:54
5. "Lost" – 3:33
6. "Merle and Me" – 3:39
7. "Loving Her (Will Make You Lose Your Mind)" – 1:54
8. "The Fish Aren't Bitin' Today" – 3:08
9. "X's and O's (Kisses and Hugs)" – 3:46

== Personnel ==
- David Allan Coe – vocals
- Wesley Taylor, Mike Barton – guitar
- Dale Seigfreid – steel guitar
- Alan Hicks – bass
- Skeet Petty – drums
- George Heard – harmonica
- Billy Sherrill, Ron Bledsoe – producer
