= Family Album (David Allan Coe album) =

Studio album by David Allan Coe
- Released: April 1978
- Recorded: 1978
- Studio: Columbia (Nashville, Tennessee); Quadrafonic Sound (Nashville, Tennessee); Creative Workshop (Nashville, Tennessee)
- Genre: Country
- Length: 43:13
- Label: Columbia
- Producer: Ron Bledsoe

David Allan Coe chronology
Nothing Sacred (1977)	Family Album (1978)	Human Emotions (1978)

Family Album is an album by country musician David Allan Coe, released in 1978 by Columbia Records.

== Recording ==
The LP is best remembered for containing Coe's own version of "Take This Job and Shove It" and "Divers Do It Deeper". The former was released by Johnny Paycheck in October 1977 and became his signature tune. The song is a first person account of a man who has worked for fifteen years with no apparent reward, and it struck a chord with the public, even inspiring a 1981 film of the same name. Although Coe's name was credited, the assumption by many that Paycheck, an acclaimed songwriter himself, composed the tune would feed into Coe's growing bitterness with the industry as another one of his peers exploded in popularity. Coe was further disenchanted when pop star Jimmy Buffett accused him of plagiarising his hit "Changes in Latitudes, Changes in Attitudes" for Coe's "Divers Do It Deeper".

The subject matter on Family Album runs the gamut for a country record, populated by songs about heartache, alcoholism, and adultery. It opens with the title track, a seven-minute recollection of childhood and family life with a spoken introduction similar to previous Coe recordings like "Daddy Was a God Fearing Man". "Guilty Footsteps" and "I've Got to Have You" are "cheatin' songs" with the narrator telling his lover, "I know you're worried about where you stand/The ring that he gave you is still on your hand." "Million Dollar Memories" is a stellar approximation of the country songs Jerry Lee Lewis recorded on Mercury Records, with Coe mimicking Jerry Lee's vocal delivery and even saying "Think about it," one of the Killer's favourite in-song expressions, while Nashville session pianist Hargus "Pig" Robbins cops Lewis's piano flourishes. Coe imitates Lewis directly on "Bad Impressions", a novelty song where Coe does credible impersonations of several country stars, including Hank Snow, Gary Stewart, and Bill Anderson.

Coe composed seven of the ten tracks on Family Album himself, one of the exceptions being "Whole Lot of Lonesome", a rare co-write with George Jones. Appropriately, it is a despairing song of heartache. Within the song, Coe mentions the name "Tammy" before singing one of the choruses, a nod to Jones's ex-wife Tammy Wynette.

== Reception ==
Professional ratings
Review scores
Source	Rating
AllMusic	3/5 stars
The Rolling Stone Album Guide	2/5 stars

Family Album reached No. 47 on the country albums chart. The album's cover did not help its commercial potential, as pointed out in Thom Jurek's AllMusic review: "1978's Family Album features one of the most bizarre covers in David Allan Coe's - hell, anybody's - catalog. He is dressed in a minister's black, flowing robe with an Amish hat, a little blonde girl in his lap, his two - yes, two (of three at one time) - wives standing behind him, and behind them, a black Lincoln Town Car and Coe's Silver Eagle tour bus. The album is dedicated to his two mothers - he's apparently from a Mormon family - and stipulates how difficult it is for a child to have two mothers. It's so surreal one is almost afraid to play the recording."

== Track listing ==
All songs written by David Allan Coe except where noted.

1. "Family Album" – 7:11
2. "Million Dollar Memories" (Coe, Carol G. Anderson) – 3:12
3. "Divers Do It Deeper" – 3:02
4. "Guilty Footsteps" (Coe, Margaret Smith, Nova Fitzgerald) – 2:49
5. "Take This Job and Shove It" – 2:59
6. "Houston, Dallas, San Antone" – 3:38
7. "I've Got to Have You" – 5:56
8. "Whole Lot of Lonesome" (Coe, George Jones) – 3:29
9. "Bad Impressions" – 3:06
10. "Heavenly Father, Holy Mother" – 5:26

== Personnel ==
- David Allan Coe, The Nashville Edition – vocals
- Billy Sanford – dobro
- Johnny Christopher, Tommy Allsup, Reggie Young, Billy Sanford – guitar
- Lloyd Green, Weldon Myrick – steel guitar
- Mike Leech, Henry Strzelecki, Ted Reynolds, Ron Bledsoe – bass
- Kenny Malone, Ralph Gallant, Buster Phillips – drums
- Hargus "Pig" Robbins, Ron Oates – piano
- Buddy Spicher – violin, mandolin
- Billy Sherrill – producer
