= The Champ (Moe Bandy album) =

Studio album by Moe Bandy
- Released: 1980
- Studio: Jack Clement Recording (Nashville, Tennessee); Woodland (Nashville, Tennessee)
- Genre: Country
- Label: Columbia
- Producer: Ray Baker

Moe Bandy chronology
One of a Kind (1979)	The Champ (1980)	Following the Feeling (1980)

The Champ is the 13th album by country singer Moe Bandy, released in 1980 on the Columbia label recorded at Jack Clement Recording Studio "B" and Woodland Sound Studios.

== Track listing ==
1. "The Champ" (Dave Kirby, Warren Robb) - 2:29
2. "The Cowboy's a Kitten at Home" (Jimmy Mundy, Peggy White) - 2:04
3. "The Wild Side of Life" (William Warren, Arlie A. Carter) - 3:07
4. "Beethoven Was Before My Time" (J. Dycks) - 2:30
5. "The Giver Took All She Could Stand" (Bobby P. Barker) - 2:39
6. "Yesterday Once More" (Jimmy Mundy, Peggy White) - 2:58
7. "I Just Can't Leave These Honky Tonks Alone" (Virgil Warner, Ernie Rowell) - 2:13
8. "She Took Out The Outlaw in Me" (Jimmy Mundy, Peggy White) - 2:20
9. "Like Some Good Ol' Boy" (Virgil Warner) - 2:05
10. "Accidentally On Purpose Tonight" (Pat Bunch, Peggy White) - 2:54

== Musicians ==
- Hargus "Pig" Robbins
- Henry Strzelecki
- Leo Jackson
- Weldon Myrick
- Dave Kirby
- Johnny Gimble
- Ray Edenton
- Kenny Malone
- Leon Rhodes
- Charlie McCoy
- Bob Moore
- Buddy Spicher
- Wayne Jackson

== Backing ==
- The Jordanaires
- Laverna Moore.

== Production ==
- Sound engineers - Billy Sherrill, Harold Lee, Les Ladd
- Photography - Slick Lawson
- Design - Team-Johnson

== Charts ==
Chart performance for The Champ
Chart (1980)	Peak position
US Top Country Albums (Billboard)	57
