= Love Is What Life's All About =

Studio album by Moe Bandy
- Released: 1978
- Genre: Country
- Label: Columbia
- Producer: Ray Baker

Moe Bandy chronology
Soft Lights and Hard Country Music (1978)	Love Is What Life's All About (1978)	It's a Cheating Situation (1979)

Love Is What Life's All About is the tenth album by country singer Moe Bandy, released in 1978 on the Columbia label.

== Track listing ==
1. "Love Is What Life's All About" (Carl Belew, Van Givens, Moe Bandy) - 2:37
2. "A Ghost of a Chance" (Steve Collom) - 2:43
3. "I Guess I Had a Real Good Time Last Night" (Carl Belew, Van Givens) - 2:36
4. "Big Flicking Baby" (Carl Belew, Van Givens, Ramsey Kearney, Moe Bandy) - 2:31
5. "For The Tears To Come" (Steve Collom) - 2:38
6. "Two Lonely People" (Tom Benjamin, Ed Penney) - 2:46
7. "Jambalaya (On The Bayou)" (Hank Williams) - 2:34
8. "Mom and Dad's Waltz" (Lefty Frizzell) - 2:45
9. "I Never Miss a Day (Missing You)" (Carl Belew, Van Givens, Moe Bandy) - 2:51
10. "Yippy Cry Yi" (Joseph P. Allen, Hoy H. Lindsey) - 2:49

== Musicians ==
- Bob Moore
- Tommy Allsup
- Hargus "Pig" Robbins
- Weldon Myrick
- Jerry Carrigan
- Chip Young
- Leo Jackson
- Reggie Young
- Charlie McCoy
- Johnny Gimble

== Backing ==
- The Jordanaires
- The Nashville Edition

== Personnel ==
- Sound engineers - Ron Reynolds, Billy Sherrill, Lou Bradley
- Art Direction - Virginia Team
- Design - Bill Barnes
- Photography - J. Clark Thomas

== Charts ==
Chart	Peak position
US Top Country Albums (Billboard)	33
