= Rough Rider (album) =

Studio album by David Allan Coe
- Released: 1982
- Studios: CBS Studios, Nashville
- Genre: Country
- Label: Columbia
- Producer: Billy Sherrill

David Allan Coe chronology
| Tennessee Whiskey (1981) | Rough Rider (1982) | D.A.C. (1982) |

Rough Rider is an album released by country musician David Allan Coe. It was released in 1982 on Columbia.

== Recording ==
Coe's fourth album in two years was written and recorded during a period of marital turmoil, and the five songs he composed for the LP reflect this personal upheaval. The first two numbers, "Pouring Water on a Drowning Man" and "What Made You Change Your Mind," are cry-in-your-beer breakup songs coming to the painful realisation that love is slipping away. The Walt Aldridge-Billy Henderson ballad "Now I Lay Me Down to Cheat" - which was a minor hit for Coe, reaching #62 - continues this theme, with the singer uttering the guilty prayer:

Now I lay me down to cheat
On the woman I love so
If I die between these sheets
I pray to God she'll never know

"Time After Time" and "Always and Never" are the closest Coe comes to anything approaching love songs, but these tunes are tinged with jaded pessimism and ambivalence. "Ice Cold Love" sees Coe and producer Billy Sherrill experimenting with a synthesizer, but the result sounds thin, as if somebody was playing a video game in the studio as the song was being recorded. They fare much better on the cover of Percy Sledge's "Take Time to Know Her," with Sherrill's sweeping production couching Coe's strong yet sensitive vocal. The song would be released as a single and peak at #58. The title track is a waltz that tells the story of a rodeo man who has a one night stand and falls in love with a "girl of the night" but is ultimately rejected by her.

== Reception ==
According to Thom Jurek, a reviewer for AllMusic, "Rough Rider contains some of Coe's finest performances." Jurek calls Coe's readings of the two Larry Murray songs "stellar," closing the LP "on a note of acceptance and regret." Ultimately, however, Rough Rider did not chart.

== Track listing ==
All songs written by David Allan Coe except as indicated.

1. "Pouring Water on a Drowning Man"
2. "What Made You Change Your Mind"
3. "Ice Cold Love"
4. "Now I Lay Me Down to Cheat" (Walt Aldridge/Billy Henderson)
5. "Rough Rider" (Daniel D. Darst)
6. "Take Time to Know Her" (Stephen Allen Davis/Al Gallico)
7. "Time After Time"
8. "Forever and Never"
9. "Headed for the Country" (Larry Murray)
10. "Meanwhile Back in Memphis" (Murray)
