= Spectrum VII =

Studio album by David Allan Coe
- Released: April 1979
- Recorded: 1979
- Studio: Columbia Studio, Pete's Place, Nashville, Tennessee
- Genre: Country
- Length: 34:15
- Label: Columbia
- Producer: Billy Sherrill

David Allan Coe chronology
Human Emotions (1979)	Spectrum VII (1979)	Compass Point (1979)

Spectrum VII is an album by country musician David Allan Coe, released in 1979 on Columbia Records.

== Recording ==
As on his previous album Human Emotions, Coe gave each side of Spectrum VII a theme: side one was called “Land Side” and side two was christened “Ocean Side.” However, unlike that album, the lyrics on Spectrum VII were breezier and more reflective. The ocean theme is apparent on the LP’s cover, which displays a shirtless Coe on a tropical beach, and in the music, as Coe had been incorporating Caribbean sounds into his delinquent mix of stone country and southern rock material. This became a bone of contention for Jimmy Buffett, who accused Coe of stealing the melody from his song “Changes in Latitudes, Changes in Attitudes" for Coe’s “Divers Do It Deeper," which appeared on the 1978 LP Family Album. "I would have sued him," Buffett later said, "but I didn't want to give Coe the pleasure of having his name in the paper." Coe replied by writing the insulting "Jimmy Buffett", which appeared on Nothing Sacred, an album of explicit material released by mail order in 1978 through the back pages of the biker magazine Easyriders. Spectrum VII contained a note stating "Jimmy Buffett doesn't live in Key West anymore," a lyric from the song. A more affable shout out went to Meat Loaf, to whom Coe dedicated the hard rocking “Sudden Death” for “believing in rock and roll and Ohio boys.” The ever prolific Coe wrote all ten tracks on the album, with the only co-write being the pleading “Fall in Love with You,” which he composed with Leon Petty and includes an opening vocal part reminiscent of Simon and Garfunkel’s “Mrs. Robinson.” “On My Feet Again’ contains the lines “I left my stomach in Houston on some surgeon’s knife but I slept through it all…” which alludes to complications from a recent burst appendix. "Ocean Side" collects four sunny marine-themed songs, including the nautical epic "Seven Mile Bridge," which stretches to over seven minutes. "Now's the Time (To Fall in Love)" and "Fairytale Morning" also radiate with positive vibes.

== Reception ==
Professional ratings
Review scores
Source	Rating
AllMusic	4.5/5 stars

AllMusic wrote: "With the exception of 'Love Is Just a Porpoise' (one of Coe's better novelty songs), every performance on Spectrum VII is stellar, and this is among Coe's finest records."

== Track listing ==
All songs written by David Allan Coe, except where noted.

=== "Land Side" ===
1. "Rollin' with the Punches" - 1:59
2. "On My Feet Again" - 3:30
3. "Fall in Love with You" (Coe, Leon Petty) - 3:28
4. "What Can I Do" - 2:57
5. "Sudden Death" - 2:08

=== "Ocean Side" ===
1. "Fairytale Morning" - 3:19
2. "Seven Mile Bridge" - 7:12
3. "Now's the Time" - 2:34
4. "Love Is Just a Porpoise" - 2:52

== Personnel ==
- David Allan Coe - rhythm guitar, vocals
- Pam Rose, Barbara South, Linda Hargrove - vocals
- Wesley Taylor - lead guitar
- Dale Seigfreid - steel guitar
- Alan Hicks - bass guitar
- Skeet Petty - drums
- Billy Sherrill - producer
