= Freakin' at the Freakers Ball =

Studio album by Shel Silverstein
- Released: 1972
- Genre: Comedy; country; rock; folk
- Length: 44:48
- Label: Columbia
- Producer: Ron Haffkine

Shel Silverstein chronology
A Boy Named Sue and Other Country Songs (1969)	Freakin' at the Freakers Ball (1972)	Crouchin' On The Outside (1973)

Professional ratings
Review scores
Source	Rating
AllMusic	4.5/5 stars

Freakin' at the Freakers Ball is a studio album produced by Ron Haffkine written by Shel Silverstein originally released November 15, 1972. The title track was covered by Dr. Hook & The Medicine Show on an album titled Sloppy Seconds.

The tracks "Sarah Cynthia Sylvia Stout Would Not Take the Garbage Out" and "The Peace Proposal" would later be released as poems in Silverstein's collection Where the Sidewalk Ends, with "The Peace Proposal" being retitled "The Generals".

== Influence ==
According to country singer David Allan Coe, Freakin' at the Freakers Ball inspired him to record his own comedic music, and he was encouraged by Shel Silverstein to record these songs, resulting in the controversial albums Nothing Sacred and Underground Album.

== Track listing ==
All tracks composed by Shel Silverstein; except where indicated

No.	Title	Writer(s)	Length
1.	"Thumbsucker"		4:29
2.	"I Got Stoned and I Missed It"		3:08
3.	"Sahra Cynthia Sylvia Stout Would Not Take the Garbage Out"		2:45
4.	"Stacy Brown Got Two"		2:47
5.	"Polly in a Porny"		2:52
6.	"Freakin' at the Freakers Ball"		3:19
7.	"All About You"		3:04
8.	"Don't Give a Dose to the One You Love the Most"		3:12
9.	"The Peace Proposal"		1:33
10.	"Masochistic Baby"	Mike Settle, Shel Silverstein	1:37
11.	"Liberated Lady 1999"		3:20
12.	"The Man Who Got No Sign"		5:08
13.	"A Front Row Seat to Hear Ole Johnny Sing" (with Johnny Cash) (1999 CD release bonus track)		3:55
14.	"26 Second Song" (1999 CD release bonus track)		0:28
15.	"Everybody's Makin' It Big But Me" (1999 CD release bonus track)		3:11
