= One of a Kind (Moe Bandy album) =

One Of A Kind

Studio album by Moe Bandy
- Released: 1979
- Studio: Jack Clement Recording (Nashville, Tennessee); CBS (Nashville, Tennessee)
- Genre: Country
- Label: Columbia
- Producer: Ray Baker

Moe Bandy chronology
It's a Cheating Situation (1979)	One Of A Kind (1979)	The Champ (1980)

One of a Kind is the twelfth album by the country singer Moe Bandy, recorded at the Jack Clement Recording Studio and CBS Recording Studios, Nashville, Tennessee, and released in 1979 on the Columbia label.

== Track listing ==
1. "I Cheated Me Right Out of You" (Bobby P. Barker) - 3:02
2. "One of a Kind" (Sonny Throckmorton, Bobby Fischer) - 2:11
3. "Gonna Honky Tonk Right Out on You" (H. Mundy) - 2:09
4. "The Bitter with The Sweet*" (Jim Mundy) - 3:01
5. "We Start The Fire (But Somebody Else Puts It Out)" (Jim Mundy) - 2:24
6. "In The Middle of Losing You" (Glenn Martin, Terry Henry) - 2:38
7. "Tell Her It's Over" (Glenn Martin) - 2:50
8. "Sweet Kentucky Woman" (Harlan Howard) - 2:49
9. "Honky Tonk Merry Go Round" (Pearly Mitchell, Pat Bunch) - 2:57
10. "Man of Means" (Herb McCullough) - 1:59

== Musicians ==
- Bob Moore
- Buddy Harman
- Leo Jackson
- Chip Young
- Weldon Myrick
- Jimmy Capps
- Charlie McCoy (Courtesy of Monument Records)
- Johnny Gimble
- Hargus "Pig" Robbins (Courtesy of Elektra Records)
- Tommy Allsup
- Kenny Malone
- Billy Sanford
- Hayward Bishop

== Backing ==
- The Jordanaires
- The Nashville Edition
- Janis Carnes

== Production ==
- Sound engineers - Ron Reynolds, Billy Sherrill
- Photography - Beverly Parker
- Art direction - Virginia Team

== Charts ==
Chart performance for One of a Kind
Chart (1980)	Peak position
US Top Country Albums (Billboard)	44
