= Cowboys Ain't Supposed to Cry =

Studio album by Moe Bandy
- Released: 1977
- Genre: Country, honky-tonk
- Label: Columbia

Moe Bandy chronology
| The Best of Moe Bandy, Volume I (1977) | Cowboys Ain't Supposed to Cry (1977) | Soft Lights and Hard Country Music (1978) |

Cowboys Ain't Supposed to Cry is an album by the American musician Moe Bandy, released in 1977. The title track was released as the first single. The album sold 40,000 copies in its first week of release; it peaked at No. 22 on Billboard's Top Country Albums chart. Bandy supported it with a North American tour.

== Production ==
Bandy was influenced primarily by Jimmie Rodgers. Many of the album's songs are about heartache and bad luck; "All I Can Handle at Home" is about a boozer with a hypersexual wife. "Misery Loves Company" is a version of the Porter Wagoner song. "Why Don't You Love Me" and "I Could Never Be Ashamed of You" are covers of the Hank Williams songs.

== Critical reception ==
Professional ratings
Review scores
| Source | Rating |
|---|---|
| All Music Guide to Country | 3/5 stars |
| Chicago Daily News | 4/4 stars |
| The Encyclopedia of Popular Music | 3/5 stars |
| The New Rolling Stone Record Guide | 3/5 stars |

The Chicago Daily News called the music "hard-edged honky-tonkin'" and noted that "Bandy can be sentimental without being cloying." The Spadea Syndicate likewise labeled Bandy the "king of heartbroken honky-tonk". The Daily Breeze described the songs as "barroom blues" and praised Bandy's "excellent voice".

The Chicago Tribune said that the album "ably showcases country traditionalism" and noted Bandy's "sensitive voice". The Sacramento Bee called Bandy "a professional loser who does it with sincerity". The Anniston Star praised the harmonica and pedal steel playing.

== Track listing ==
Side 1

1. "Cowboys Ain't Supposed to Cry"
2. "She Finally Rocked You Out of Her Mind"
3. "Up to Now I've Wanted Everything but You"
4. "Misery Loves Company"
5. "Why Don't You Love Me"

Side 2

1. "She Just Loved the Cheatin' Out of Me"
2. "No Deal"
3. "All I Can Handle at Home"
4. "Till I Stop Needing You"
5. "I Could Never Be Ashamed of You"
