= Requiem for a Harlequin =

Studio album by David Allan Coe
- Released: 1970
- Genre: Psychedelic
- Length: 31:39
- Label: SSS International

David Allan Coe chronology
Penitentiary Blues (1970)	Requiem for a Harlequin (1970)	The Mysterious Rhinestone Cowboy (1974)

Professional ratings
Review scores
Source	Rating
AllMusic	3/5 stars
The Encyclopedia of Popular Music	3/5 stars

Requiem for a Harlequin is the second album by American musician David Allan Coe. It was released in 1970 on SSS International Records. The album is a departure from Coe's work mostly in the country music genre. There are no songs in the traditional sense on Harlequin, rather each side of the original LP is a lengthy spoken monologue over musical accompaniment. Side one is named "The Beginning", and side two was called "The End".

It is a concept album in which Coe repeatedly uses the phrase "Asphalt Jungle" to describe the life he grew up in. Reoccurring themes include hard tales of life, love, relationships, the Civil Rights Movement, 60's Counter Culture ideology, and modern society. The record is entirely spoken word (self described by Coe in recent years as "The first rap album") with backing music encompassing a wide variety of genres including rock and roll, blues, folk, and gospel.

The liner notes on the back of the album cover describe how David Allan Coe and his foster father, Jack, wrote the lyrics to the album while serving time in a maximum security block in an Ohio prison.

== Critical reception ==
Phoenix New Times called Requiem for a Harlequin a "politically charged psychedelic concept album [...] a stylistic aberration [that] presaged Coe's fondness for the outré and counter-establishment."

== Track listing ==
All songs written by David Allan Coe

1. "The Beginning" (Side A) - 15:59
2. "The End" (Side B) - 15:40
