= Bandy the Rodeo Clown (song) =

Single by Moe Bandy

from the album Bandy the Rodeo Clown
- B-side: "I'm Looking For a New Way To Love"
- Released: June 1975
- Recorded: May 1975
- Genre: Country
- Length: 2:52
- Label: GRC Records 2070
- Songwriters: Sanger D. Shafer; Lefty Frizzell
- Producer: Ray Baker

Moe Bandy singles chronology
"Don't Anyone Make Love at Home Anymore" (1975)	"Bandy the Rodeo Clown" (1975)	"Hank Williams, You Wrote My Life" (1975)

"Bandy the Rodeo Clown" is a song co-written and recorded by American country music artists Sanger D. Shafer and Lefty Frizzell, and made famous by Moe Bandy. It was released in June 1975 as the title track from his third album and was his final single from GRC Records.

According to AllMusic journalist Stephen Thomas Erlewine, the song and its parent album began "to hint at the good-natured persona that would dominate his Columbia Records." The song casts Bandy as himself in the title role, a rodeo clown who laughs through heartache and the physical pain of the job.

This song, along with several of his GRC single releases, was included in several CBS and Sony Records-issued greatest-hits packages of Bandy's music that otherwise focused on his later 1970s and 1980s Columbia material. The song was also one of several songs in Bandy's catalog -- "Rodeo Romeo" and "Someday Soon" were two others—that used rodeo storylines to tie in with the complexity of relationships and heartbreak.

== Charts ==
=== Weekly charts ===
Chart (1975)	Peak position
US Hot Country Songs (Billboard)	7
Canadian RPM Country Tracks	4

=== Year-end charts ===
Chart (1975)	Position
US Hot Country Songs (Billboard)	45
