= Paul Craft =

American singer-songwriter

- Born: Paul Charles Craft; August 12, 1938; Memphis, Tennessee, U.S.
- Died: October 18, 2014 (aged 76) Nashville, Tennessee, U.S.
- Genres: Country
- Occupations: Singer, songwriter

Paul Charles Craft (August 12, 1938 – October 18, 2014) was an American country singer-songwriter. The Memphis-born Craft was known as the songwriter for Mark Chesnutt's single "Brother Jukebox" and the novelty song "It's Me Again, Margaret", recorded by Ray Stevens and Craft himself. Between 1977 and 1978, Craft charted three singles for RCA Nashville.

His song "Keep Me From Blowing Away" was originally recorded by the Seldom Scene on their 1973 album Act II and was then recorded by Linda Ronstadt on her 1974 album Heart Like a Wheel; it has since been recorded by Moe Bandy, T. Graham Brown, Jerry Lee Lewis, the Grascals, and Willie Nelson. Craft's song "Midnight Flyer" was recorded by the Eagles on their 1974 album On the Border and by himself for his own album Brother Jukebox in 1998. His song "Dropkick Me, Jesus" was a number-17 country hit for Bobby Bare in 1976. He also wrote Moe Bandy's "Hank Williams, You Wrote My Life" and T. Graham Brown's "Come as You Were", among others.

Craft was inducted into the Nashville Songwriters Hall of Fame on October 5, 2014.

Craft died at a hospital in Nashville, Tennessee on October 18, 2014, at the age of 76.

== Discography ==
Year	Single	Chart Positions	Songwriter	Label
Year	Single	US Country	Songwriter	Label
1974	"It's Me Again, Margaret"	55	Paul Craft	Truth
1977	"We Know Better"	98	Paul Craft	RCA Nashville
1977	"Lean on Jesus (Before He Leans on You)"	55	Mark Germino, Rob Stanley	RCA Nashville
1978	"Teardrops in My Tequila"	84	Paul Craft	RCA Nashville
