= Rod Hart =

American singer-songwriter

- Origin: Beulah, Michigan
- Genres: Country
- Occupation: Singer-songwriter
- Instruments: Guitar; vocals
- Years active: 1976–77
- Label: Plantation

Rod Hart Sr. was a one-hit wonder who scored a minor hit single in 1977, "C.B. Savage", which charted on both the US Billboard magazine pop and country charts. It is an answer song to "Convoy", a major hit in 1976. The song was a gay-themed takeoff on the citizens band radio fad and featured a "smokey" (highway patrolman) pretending to be a gay truck driver over the CB radio; the patrolman's masquerade distracts the lead trucker in a convoy who is listening to him, allowing the highway patrol to bust the 5-truck convoy for speeding. Allmusic called it "one of the most bizarre country novelty hits of all time." It appeared on his album Breakeroo!

Hart also wrote music for and acted in the '70's Steve McQueen rodeo film Junior Bonner. He wrote two songs for the movie (one was the local favorite "Arizona Morning") and appeared in the barroom brawl scene.

== Discography ==
=== Albums ===
Year	Album	US Country	Label
1977	Breakeroo!	31	Plantation

=== Singles ===
Year	Single	Chart positions					Album
Year	Single	US Country	US	Cash Box	CAN Country	CAN	Album
1976	"C.B. Savage"	23	67	59	10	87	Breakeroo!
