= David Allan Coe =

American country musician (1939–2026)

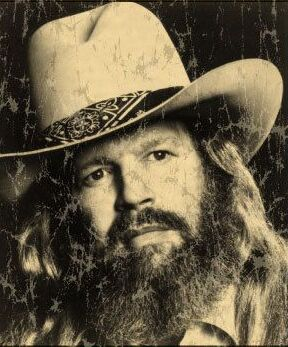
- Coe in 1976

Background information
- Also known as: DAC, The Mysterious Rhinestone Cowboy
- Born: September 6, 1939; Akron, Ohio, U.S.
- Died: April 29, 2026 (aged 86) Cincinnati, Ohio, U.S.
- Genres: Country; outlaw country; blues; hard rock; heavy metal
- Occupations: Singer; songwriter; musician
- Instruments: Vocals; guitar
- Years active: 1963–2026
- Labels: Columbia; Plantation; Top Dog

David Allan Coe (September 6, 1939 – April 29, 2026), also known by his initials DAC, or by his nickname "The Mysterious Rhinestone Cowboy", was an American outlaw country singer-songwriter and musician. Coe took up music after spending much of his early life in reform schools and prisons. He first came to prominence for busking in Nashville and initially played mostly in the blues style, before transitioning to country music, becoming a major part of the 1970s outlaw country scene. His biggest hits include "You Never Even Call Me by My Name", "Longhaired Redneck", "The Ride", "Mona Lisa Lost Her Smile", and "She Used to Love Me a Lot".

Coe's most popular songs covered by other artists include the number-one hits "Would You Lay With Me (In a Field of Stone)", sung by Tanya Tucker, and Johnny Paycheck's rendition of "Take This Job and Shove It". The latter inspired the movie of the same name. Coe's rebellious attitude, wild image, and unconventional lifestyle set him apart from other country performers, both winning him legions of fans and hindering his mainstream success by alienating the music industry establishment, while his use of profane lyrics, including racial slurs, in some of his songs also drew controversy during his career. Regardless, Coe remained a popular performer on the country music circuit until his death.

== Early life ==
Coe was born in Akron, Ohio, on September 6, 1939. His favorite singer as a child was Johnny Ace. After being sent to the Starr Commonwealth for Boys reform school at the age of nine, he spent much of the next two decades in correctional facilities, including three years at the Ohio Penitentiary and Lancaster Industrial School. Coe said he received encouragement to begin writing songs from Screamin' Jay Hawkins, with whom he had spent time in prison. He started writing songs in prison by 1963.

After concluding another prison term in 1967, Coe embarked on a music career in Nashville, living in a hearse, which he parked in front of the Ryman Auditorium while he performed on the street. He caught the attention of Shelby Singleton, owner of the independent record label Plantation Records and signed a contract with his label. Coe was a member of the Louisville, Kentucky, chapter of the Outlaws Motorcycle Club.

He was the father of Tyler Mahan Coe, the creator of the Cocaine & Rhinestones podcast, which chronicles the history of country music. He had four children with his fourth wife Jody Lynn Coe. He also had 3 biological children, 1 adopted daughter and multiple step children from his 6 marriages.

According to news sources, in 2007, he owed over $300,000 in child support.

On September 14, 2015, before District Court Judge Timothy S. Black in the U.S. District Court of the Southern District of Ohio, Coe pleaded guilty to one count of impeding and obstructing the due administration of the Internal Revenue laws. As a result of his charges, Coe faced a maximum of three years in prison and a fine of up to $250,000. In the indictment, the U.S. Department of Justice accused Coe of owing "$388,190.94 for the 2009 income tax year, $35,640.10 for the 2011 income tax year, and $42,733.82 for the 2013 income tax year, which included the income taxes owed plus interest and penalties" and "restitution . . . for the taxes due and owing as a result of his 2008 and 2010 tax returns." On Monday, June 13, 2016, Coe was sentenced to three years probation and ordered to pay the IRS $980,911.86 for the 2008 through 2013 income tax years. The case was prosecuted by Assistant United States Attorney Jessica W. Knight and led by Carter M. Stewart, United States Attorney for the Southern District of Ohio, and Kathy A. Enstrom, Special Agent in Charge, Internal Revenue Service Criminal Investigation, Cincinnati Field Office.

== Music career ==
=== Early career (1970–1975) ===
Early in 1970, Coe released his debut album, Penitentiary Blues, followed by a tour with Grand Funk Railroad. In October 1971, he signed as an exclusive writer with Pete and Rose Drake's Windows Publishing Company, Inc. in Nashville, Tennessee, where he remained until 1977. Although he developed a cult following with his performances, he was not able to develop any mainstream success, but other performers achieved charting success by recording songs Coe had written, including Billie Jo Spears' 1972 recordings "Souvenirs & California Mem'rys" and Tanya Tucker's 1973 single "Would You Lay With Me (In a Field of Stone)", which was a number-one hit and responsible for Coe becoming one of Nashville's hottest songwriters and Coe himself being signed by Columbia Records. Coe recorded his own version of the song for his second Columbia album, Once Upon a Rhyme, released in 1975. AllMusic writer Thom Jurek said of the song, "The amazing thing is that both versions are definitive."

Unlike Coe's first two albums, his third showed full commitment to country music, and Coe played a part in the evolution of what became known as outlaw country. The title of Coe's third album, The Mysterious Rhinestone Cowboy, refers to the gimmick Coe adopted several years before Glen Campbell had a hit with the song "Rhinestone Cowboy", dressing up in a rhinestone suit and wearing a Lone Ranger mask. In 2004 the singer recalled to Michael Buffalo Smith, "I guess I have to blame it on Mel Tillis. I met him when I first went to Nashville, and he had an office down on Music Row. I was over there talking to him in his office, and he opened up the closet to get something, and he had a whole closet full of rhinestone suits. I just freaked out on that. He looked at me and said, 'You like that shit, I don't even wear those, if you want 'em, take 'em!' He gave me those rhinestone suits and I wore them everywhere." Coe maintained the idea for the mask came from his father:

Then I got the mysterious rhinestone thing from my father. He asked me, 'You know the only way that the Lone Ranger can go into town? I said, 'No, I don't know what you mean.' He said that he has to take his mask off. I thought, what is my dad talking about and trying to tell me? He said, 'Well son, you have to wear a mask and then when you don't want to be David Allan Coe, you can take your mask off and go anywhere and not be like Elvis with people messin' with you all the time.'

Coe's second album, Once Upon a Rhyme, contains one of his biggest hits, "You Never Even Call Me by My Name", written by Steve Goodman and John Prine, and which first appeared on Goodman's 1971 debut release. Coe's version became his first country top-10 hit single, peaking at number eight in 1975, and includes a spoken epilogue where Coe relates a correspondence he had with Goodman, who stated the song he had written was the "perfect country and western song". Coe wrote back stating that no song could fit that description without mentioning a laundry list of clichés: "mama, or trains, or trucks, or prison, or getting drunk". Goodman's equally facetious response was an additional verse that incorporated all five of Coe's requirements, and upon receiving it, Coe acknowledged that the finished product was indeed the "perfect country and western song" and included the last verse on the record:

Well, I was drunk the day my mom got out of prison
And I went to pick 'er up in the rain
But before I could get to the station in my pickup truck
She got runned over by a damned ol' train.

Coe was a featured performer in Heartworn Highways, a 1975 documentary film by James Szalapski. Other performers featured in the film included Guy Clark, Townes Van Zandt, Rodney Crowell, Steve Young, Steve Earle, and the Charlie Daniels Band. Coe also wrote "Cocaine Carolina" for Johnny Cash and sang background vocals on the recording that appeared on Cash's 1975 album John R. Cash.

=== Outlaw years (1976–1982) ===
By 1976, the outlaw country movement was in full swing as artists such as Waylon Jennings and Willie Nelson were finally enjoying massive commercial success after years of fighting to record their music their own way. Coe, however, was still somewhat of an outsider, almost too outlaw for the outlaws, a predicament summed up well by AllMusic:

His wild, long hair; multiple earrings; flashy, glitzy rhinestone suits; Harley Davidson biker boots; and football-sized belt buckles had become obstacles to getting people to take him seriously as a recording artist. Other singers continued to record and succeed with his material, but he, himself – who was as good a singer as almost anyone and better than most – languished in obscurity. Rather than tone it down, Coe characteristically shoved the stereotypes in their faces. He retired the Mysterious Rhinestone Cowboy persona and billed his new album as 'David Allan Coe Rides Again as the Longhaired Redneck', something equally off-putting to institution types.

Longhaired Redneck was Coe's third album for Columbia in three years, and the first where he wrote or co-wrote all the songs; the outlaw country zeitgeist was summed up well in the title track, which recounts playing in a dive "where bikers stare at cowboys who are laughing at the hippies who are praying they'll get out of here alive". The song features Coe impersonating the vocal styles of Ernest Tubb, Bill Anderson, and Merle Haggard. About the term "Longhaired Redneck", Coe later said, "It was terminology that I'd made up at the time. I was trying to tell people that not everybody with long hair was a hippie. Not everyone was the kind of person that thought you could punch them out, take their money, and that they'd say, 'I won't do nothin' about it'."

By 1977, the outlaw movement was nearing its apex, having seen the release of Willie Nelson's blockbuster album Red Headed Stranger and country music's first platinum-selling album, Wanted! The Outlaws. Coe considered himself as integral as anyone in the evolution of the outlaw country genre and began saying so in his music. As noted in AllMusic's review of the album, "On Rides Again, by trying to make a conscious outlaw record and aligning himself with the movement's two progenitors on the opening track, "Willie, Waylon, and Me"...Coe already set up self-parody unintentionally – something that continued to curse him." The songs on Rides Again cross-fade without the usual silences between tracks, which was unusual for country music, and feature Coe's heavily phased guitar. Coe was also permitted to use his own band on several tracks, a major concession for Columbia at the time. However, some of his peers resented Coe placing himself in such exalted company and felt he was exploiting his relationship with his fellow outlaws. Jennings' drummer Richie Albright called Coe "a great, great songwriter. A great singer. But he could not tell the truth if it was better than a lie he'd made up. Waylon didn't make him comfortable enough to hang around. But Willie did. I was around Willie quite a bit and David Allan was with him 80% of the time. Willie allowed him to hang around." Coe managed to maintain friendships with both Jennings and Nelson, despite the former's cool treatment of him at times. In his autobiography, Jennings mentions Coe once (in a chapter titled "The Outlaw Shit"), calling him "the most sincere of the bunch" of bandwagon jumpers, but contends, "when it came to being an Outlaw, the worst thing he ever did was double-parking on Music Row", adding:

He wrote a song called "Waylon, Willie, and Me" at the same time he started taking pot shots at us in interviews, saying that Willie [Nelson] and Kris [Kristofferson] had sold out, that I was running around wearing white buck shoes, and none of us was really an Outlaw. He was the only Outlaw in Nashville...I saw him in Fort Worth, and I put my finger right up to his chest. 'You gotta knock that shit off', I told him. 'I ain't never done anything to you.' He protested, 'They just set us up...you know I love you, Waylon."...he could drive me crazy, but there was something about David that pulled at my heartstrings.

Throughout the rest of the decade, Coe released a string of strong recordings, some of which, such as Human Emotions (1978) and Spectrum VII (1979), were concept albums with each side of the discs given its own theme. His 1978 Family Album contains Coe's rendition of "Take This Job and Shove It", a song he composed, and which had been released by Johnny Paycheck in October 1977, becoming a monumental success. The song is a first-person account of a man who has worked for 15 years with no apparent reward, and it struck a chord with the public, even inspiring a 1981 film of the same name. Although Coe's name was credited, the assumption by many was that Paycheck, an acclaimed songwriter himself, composed the tune; this would feed into Coe's growing bitterness with the industry as another one of his peers exploded in popularity. Coe was further disenchanted when pop star Jimmy Buffett accused him of plagiarizing his hit "Changes in Latitudes, Changes in Attitudes" for Coe's "Divers Do It Deeper". (Coe had been incorporating Caribbean sounds into his music, as is evident on his 1979 album Compass Point.) By 1980, Coe and producer Billy Sherrill set out to reach a wider audience and bring Coe back to the charts by inviting other singers and musicians to take part in the sessions for what would become I've Got Something to Say, which boasted contributions from Guy Clark, Bill Anderson, Dickey Betts (from the Allman Brothers Band), Kris Kristofferson, Larry Jon Wilson, and George Jones. This process was continued the following year on Invictus (Means) Unconquered, with Sherrill couching the songs in tasteful instrumentation that put the spotlight squarely on Coe's voice. (In his AllMusic review, Thom Jurek labelled it "arguably the finest album of his career")

By 1981, the outlaw country movement waned as the slicker "urban cowboy" era took hold in country music, typified by the Johnny Lee hit "Lookin' for Love", which critic Kurt Wolff panned as an example of "watered-down cowboy music". Coe was an important figure in the outlaw country genre, but judging by the sound of his recordings from this period, he had no interest in the trendy urban cowboy phase. Refusing to give into the flavor-of-the-month generic country "talent", Coe stuck to what he knew and sharpened the edges. However, while scoring some moderate hits, mainstream success remained elusive. Coe's highest-charting single during this period was "Get a Little Dirt on Your Hands", a duet with Bill Anderson, which peaked at number 45. As if aware of the compromises he had been making, Coe chose to close out his 1982 album D.A.C. with a suite of three songs that contained a short prologue:

Makin' records is, uh, somethin' that's kind of hard for me to do because I'm an entertainer. So I made my mind up a few albums ago that I was gonna do so many songs for the record company and so many for myself...we've turned the lights down low in the studio and the musicians have thrown away their little cheat sheets. So this is for all you David Allan Coe fans that's been with me for a long time who didn't really care if I got played on the radio or not.

=== Commercial success (1983–1989) ===
Castles in the Sand became a huge comeback for Coe, peaking at number eight on the country albums chart, his highest showing since Once Upon a Rhyme hit the same mark eight years earlier. Its success was spurred on by "The Ride", which was released in February 1983 as the lead single from the album and reached number one on the June 4 Cashbox Country Singles Chart. It spent 19 weeks on the Billboard country singles charts, reaching a peak of number four and hitting number two on the Canadian RPM Country Tracks chart. The ballad tells the first-person story of a hitchhiker's encounter with the ghost of Hank Williams, Sr. on a ride from Montgomery, Alabama, to Nashville. The mysterious driver, "dressed like 1950, half-drunk and hollow-eyed", questions the narrator whether he has the musical talent and dedication to become a star in the country music industry. The song's lyrics place the events on U.S. Route 31 or the largely parallel Interstate 65. Buoyed by the single, Castles in the Sand became the mainstream breakthrough that Coe and producer Blilly Sherrill had been trying for since the decade began. Just Divorced in 1984 contains Coe's second-biggest chart hit, "Mona Lisa Lost Her Smile", which rose to number two on the Billboard country singles chart and number three on Cashbox. In Canada, it reached number one on the RPM Country Tracks charts dated for June 30, 1984. The song is a midtempo ballad about a young, blonde girl, featuring allusions to the iconic Da Vinci painting. The song features one of producer Billy Sherrill's most elaborate productions, with one critic commenting, "The layered strings and organ work are slick, but they add such warmth and depth in contrast to Coe's voice that it works to devastating effect." Another track, "Missin' the Kid", finds a father lamenting the loss of his daughter, who now lives with his estranged ex-wife. Over a languid beat and using simple language, Coe delivers a stunning vocal performance that expresses with weary resignation the bitterness, guilt, and extreme sadness that comes with a broken family. Beginning with the line, "I still can't believe after all of these years, I still miss you," the narrator wonders what his wife will tell their daughter when she asks about him, and finally declares:

I tell myself that it's best if I don't try to see her
Seeing her now could not make up for all she's been through
Watching two people she once called her mother and father
Acting like strangers, that's something I just could not do

In his AllMusic review of the album, writer Thom Jurek writes:

"Missin' the Kid" is a self-penned waltz that is sad and haunted, full of regret and remorse over the loss of his daughter when his second marriage broke up, something he never got over. It's also one of the most sensitive things he's ever written, as it is full of empathy for a daughter he hasn't seen in over ten years.

"She Used to Love Me a Lot" was released in December 1984 and peaked at number 11 on both the US Billboard Hot Country Singles chart and the Canadian RPM Country Tracks chart. (A version of the song by Johnny Cash was recorded in the early 1980s, but remained unreleased until 2014.) The song tells of a chance meeting between two ex-lovers at the Silver Spoon Café, but when the man tries to rekindle the romance, she dismisses him in the same cavalier way he did her years earlier. It was written by Dennis Morgan, Charles Quillen, and Kye Fleming, as Coe - who continued to write songs of high quality - nonetheless relied on outside writers to get him on the charts. The 1986 album Son of the South included contributions from fellow outlaw legends Nelson, Jennings, and Jessi Colter. His final recording for Columbia, the concept album A Matter of Life…and Death, was released in 1987.

=== Later career and death (1990–2026) ===
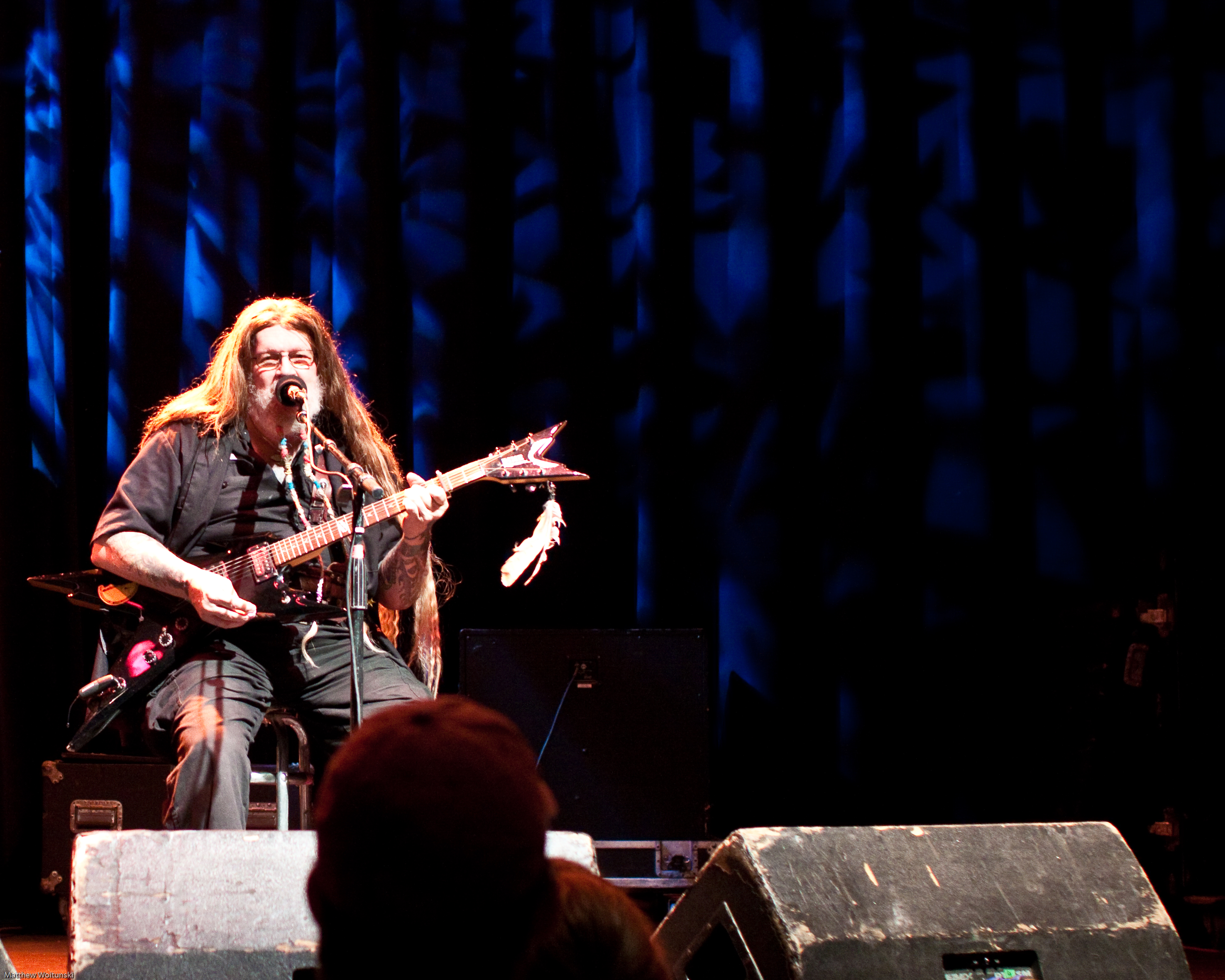
Coe performing in Foxboro, Massachusetts, in 2011

In 1990, Coe reissued his independent albums Nothing Sacred and Underground Album on compact disc, as well as the compilation 18 X-Rated Hits. Throughout the 1990s, Coe had a successful career as a concert performer in the United States and Europe. In 1999, Coe met Pantera guitarist Dimebag Darrell in Fort Worth, Texas, and the two musicians, struck by the similarity of the approaches between country, hard rock, and heavy metal, agreed to work together, and began production on an album.

In 2000, Coe toured as the opening act for Kid Rock. That same year, The New York Times published an article by journalist Neil Strauss, who described the material on Nothing Sacred and Underground Album as "among the most racist, misogynist, homophobic, and obscene songs recorded by a popular songwriter". Coe maintained that he wrote to Strauss during the writing of the article, but the journalist did not acknowledge any interaction between the two, only stating that Coe's manager refused to speak on the record. Coe denied accusations of racism, stating that the songs in question were intended as ribald satire, inspired by his friendship with Shel Silverstein, and furthermore noting that the drummer in his band in 2000 was a black man.

In 2003, Coe wrote a song for Kid Rock, "Single Father", which appeared on Kid Rock's self-titled album, and was released as a single, which peaked at number 50 on the Billboard Country Singles chart. Rebel Meets Rebel, with Dimebag Darrell, Vinnie Paul, and Rex Brown, recorded sporadically between 1999 and 2003, was released in 2006, two years after Darrell's murder. AllMusic described it as a "groundbreaking" country metal album.

In the 2006 video "God's Gonna Cut You Down", Coe introduces Johnny Cash as the Man in Black. The video, directed by Tony Kaye, was released in connection with Cash's cover of the song in American V: A Hundred Highways. On March 19, 2013, Coe was involved in a car crash in Ocala, Florida, which he suffered broken ribs, bruised kidneys, head trauma, and multiple lacerations. He was discharged from the hospital on March 27. On February 22, 2018, it was announced that he'd been hospitalized for an ear infection, which, at first, was mistakenly described as a stroke. He was discharged two days later. On April 15, 2019, he was admitted to a hospital in Athens, Georgia for knee replacement surgery. He was discharged two days later. On August 30, 2021, he was hospitalized with COVID-19 after testing positive. He wouldn't be discharged until less than a month later on September 21. In 2017, he was featured singing "Take This Job" on the album Baptized in Bourbon by the Moonshine Bandits. He also sings in the video. In 2024, Coe and Hank Williams III collaborated with Hardy on Hardy's single, "Live Forever" on the album Quit!!.

On April 29, 2026, Coe died in a hospital in Cincinnati, Ohio. He was 86 and suffering from pneumonia, kidney failure, colon cancer, and liver cancer. Notable tributes included Willie Nelson, Hank Williams Jr., Hank Williams III, Coleman Williams, Kid Rock, Shooter Jennings, Brantley Gilbert, Justin Moore, Eric Church, Chris Stapleton, Jamey Johnson, Sturgill Simpson, Tanya Tucker, Alan Jackson, Aaron Lewis, and much more.

=== Outlaw origins ===
Coe's integrity was called into question after his previous claim that he had spent time on death row for killing an inmate who tried to rape him was debunked when a Texas documentarian discovered Coe had done time for possessing burglary tools and indecent materials, but never murder. Criticisms such as these notwithstanding, Coe always maintained he was integral to the outlaw country movement getting its name, stating in 2003:

…the truth is that Waylon and Willie Nelson and I played at an outdoor festival called "48 Hours in Atoka", in Oklahoma...when we got there...several women were raped and people stabbed! There was a lot of alcohol and drugs or whatever. I told my band, 'Don't worry about it. We'll provide our own protection.' At that time, I was in the Outlaws Motorcycle Club. I had my Outlaws' colors on, I had my pistol in my pocket, and I rode my motorcycle up on stage while Waylon was singing. I got off my motorcycle and went out and started singing with Waylon. And then Willie came out and sang with us. There was a picture of us in the paper that had an arrow pointing to the pistol in my pocket, and another arrow pointing to where it said, 'Outlaws, Florida.' The headline said, 'The Outlaws came to town.' That's actually how it all started.

Coe was uncompromising when it came to his lifestyle and language, even though it kept him off country playlists and award shows. For example, "The House We've Been Calling Home", from the 1977 album Rides Again, explores the theme of polygamy ('me and my wives have been spending our lives in a house we've been calling a home...'), while on the final cut on the album, "If That Ain't Country (I'll Kiss Your Ass)", Coe utters a racial slur on record for the first time, singing the line "workin' like a nigger for my room and board". The song paints a picture of a Texas family that verges on caricature, with the narrator describing his tattooed father as 'veteran proud' and deeming his oldest sister "a first-rate whore". The song further alienated Coe from the country mainstream and kick-started accusations that he was a racist, a charge he always vehemently denied. In 2004, he remarked:

I am a songwriter, you know, and to me it has always bothered me that actors in the movies can say whatever they want to say, kill people, rape people, and do things and no one ever accuses them personally of being that way. But when you write a song and then all of a sudden you are being accused of something. To me, songwriting is painting a picture and all you have to work with is words...I grew up with all my life hearing, 'lazy as a Mexican', 'stingy as a Jew', 'working like a nigger', or 'dumb as a Polack'. It's stereotype stuff that you hear growing up that immediately puts a picture in your head.

The cover of the 1986 release Son of the South, which displayed Coe holding a baby with a Confederate flag draped over his shoulders, galled many industry insiders, although Coe did print a message on the back of the album to defuse any potential backlash:

I was born in Akron, Ohio, and I moved to the South when I was in my early 20s, which made me a "yankee" rebel son. I am not against anything or any place or any nationalities. Regardless of what you've heard about me, there are two things I am very proud of. One of them is my son Tyler, who is my first-born son. And the other is my personal relationship with God. I am proud of that relationship as I am proud that my son was conceived in Nashville, Tennessee, and he is truly a son of the south.

In another interview, Coe said, "Anyone that would look at me and say I was a racist, would have to be out of their mind. I have dreadlocks down to my waist with earrings in both ears and my beard is down to my waist and it is in braids...I was in prison with 87% black people, I hung around with black people, and I learned to sing music with black people. It was ironic that in prison the white guys called me a 'nigger lover' and now I write the word 'nigger' in a song and I am all of a sudden a racist. It is pretty ironic."

=== Underground albums ===
While Coe lived in Key West, Shel Silverstein played Coe his comedy music album Freakin' at the Freakers Ball, spurring Coe to perform his own comedic songs for Silverstein, who encouraged Coe to record them, leading to the production of the independently released Nothing Sacred. Jimmy Buffett accused Coe of plagiarizing the melody of "Divers Do It Deeper" from Buffett's "Changes in Latitudes, Changes in Attitudes", stating, "I would have sued him, but I didn't want to give Coe the pleasure of having his name in the paper." In response to the success of Buffett's song, Coe wrote a song insulting Buffett, and it appeared on Nothing Sacred. The album was released by mail order in 1978, through the back pages of the biker magazine Easyriders. The album also contains a song targeting Anita Bryant, a musician notable for her strong opposition to LGBT rights, specifically her fight to repeal an LGBT anti-discrimination ordinance in Miami-Dade County. In the song, bluntly titled "Fuck Aneta Briant" [sic], Coe calls out Bryant as being hypocritical for her opposition to the lifestyles of gay people, stating, "In fact, Anita Bryant, some act just like you".

Coe's 1979 Columbia album Spectrum VII contained a note stating "Jimmy Buffett does not live in Key West anymore", a lyric from a song from Nothing Sacred. The album's songs are profane, often sexually explicit, and describe an orgy in Nashville's Centennial Park and sex with pornographic film star Linda Lovelace.

In 1982, Coe released another independent album, Underground Album, which contained his most controversial song, "Nigger Fucker". Written from the perspective of a man whose lover left him for an African American man, the sexually explicit song resulted in Coe being accused of racism. Primarily because of this song, the material recorded by singer and white supremacist Johnny Rebel has also been mistakenly attributed to Coe. AllMusic, which did not review Underground Album, gave it three out of five stars. Coe responded to the accusations by saying "Anyone that hears this album and says I'm a racist, is full of shit." Coe has also pointed out that his longtime drummer, Kerry Brown, is Black, and is married to a White woman. When asked about Coe's X-rated albums, Brown stated, "David Allan Coe was controversial. I inspired him to write those songs. Some of the songs are really out there. But it's my life. When you live in the David Allan Coe world, you learn to be controversial."

=== Bankruptcy ===
Coe was in legal conflict with the Internal Revenue Service (IRS), costing him the publishing rights to his compositions, including "Take This Job and Shove It". He stated in 2003:

All of my songs up to 1984 were sold in a bankruptcy proceeding for, like, $25,000 from the bankruptcy court, because nobody told me they'd been put up for sale! Basically, the IRS claimed I owed them $100,000. I was living at a place and we had a flood and everything was destroyed. They knew I didn't have any records – any proof of what I did have and what I didn't have. So, I just filed [for] bankruptcy. [Willie] Nelson chose to deal with them. I chose not to. I'm totally straight with them now. The only income I have is the money I make on the road performing and from my new songs that I own.

In another interview, Coe added, "All the songs on the X-rated albums were sold. I don't own that stuff anymore. I have nothing to do with that stuff. They have to give me credit as the songwriter, but I don't make one cent."

== Musical style ==
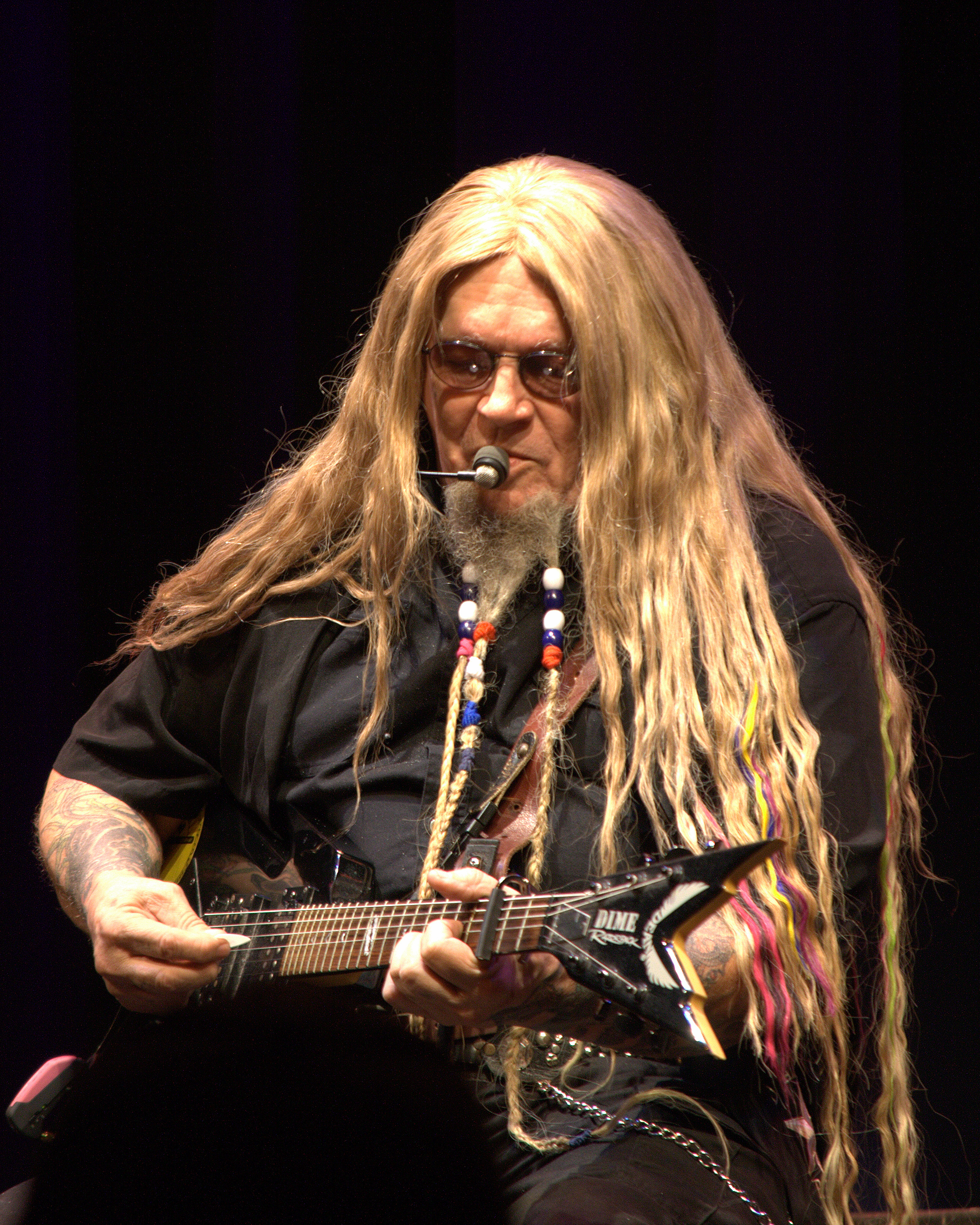
Coe performing in 2009

Coe's musical style derives from blues and country music traditions. His vocal style is described as a 'throaty baritone'. His lyrical content is often humorous or comedic, with William Ruhlmann describing him as a 'near-parody of a country singer'. Stephen Thomas Erlewine described Coe as "a great, unashamed country singer, singing the purest honky-tonk and hardest country of his era […] he may not be the most original outlaw, but there is none more outlaw than him".

Coe's lyrics frequently include references to alcohol and drug use and are often boisterous and cocky. Coe's debut album Penitentiary Blues was described as "voodoo blues" and "redneck music" by Allmusic's Thom Jurek. It focused on themes such as working for the first time, blood tests from veins used to inject heroin, prison time, hoodoo imagery, and death. The album's influences included Charlie Rich, Jerry Lee Lewis, Bo Diddley, Lightnin' Hopkins, and Tony Joe White. Coe later explained to Kristofer Engelhardt of Review: "I didn't really care for some of the country music until people like Kris Kristofferson and some of those people started writing songs. They had a little more to say than just, 'Oh baby I miss you', or whatever. I don't do anything halfway. Once I got into country music, I went back and researched it, and learned everything there was to know about it. I could do impersonations of Roy Acuff, Ernest Tubb, Hank Snow, Marty Robbins, just about anybody. I knew just about all there was to know about country music."

His first country album, The Mysterious Rhinestone Cowboy, has been described as alt-country, pre-punk, and "a hillbilly version of Marc Bolan's glitz and glitter". Credited influences on the album include Merle Haggard. During his early career, Coe was known for his unpredictable live performances, in which he would ride a Harley-Davidson motorcycle onto the stage and curse at his audience. Coe also performed in a rhinestone suit and a mask which resembled that of the Lone Ranger, calling himself the Mysterious Rhinestone Cowboy.

Despite accusations of racism for the content of some of his song lyrics, Coe's psychedelic concept album Requiem for a Harlequin (1970) had Coe "honoring the birth of soul music, ranting against the KKK, and commiserating with other children of the 'concrete jungle'" in what Phoenix New Times described as "Coe's Black Panther audition tape" and a "stab at radical chic", and his later album Rebel Meets Rebel featured a song, "Cherokee Cry", which criticizes the United States government's treatment of Native Americans. When asked why he did not write more political songs, Coe replied, "I live in my own world, not thee world. I just write songs about what affects me in everyday life. At one point I wrote a song that was sort of a protest about when they were talking about drafting women into the military. It was about my son making it past the draft, but my daughter didn't. And I've done Farm Aid."

In his review of Coe's 1987 album A Matter of Life...and Death, Allmusic's Thom Jurek wrote, "Coe may have had some hits, but it is records like this that make one wonder if there was not a conspiracy to marginalize him and make him fail. Coe is a brilliant songwriter well into the 21st century, and deserves to be lauded along with the likes of [Willie] Nelson and [Waylon] Jennings and Kristofferson and Newbury – and even Cash."

== Discography ==
=== Studio albums ===
- Penitentiary Blues (1970)
- Requiem for a Harlequin (1970)
- The Mysterious Rhinestone Cowboy (1974)
- Once Upon a Rhyme (1975)
- Longhaired Redneck (1976)
- Rides Again (1977)
- Tattoo (1977)
- Texas Moon (1977) (recorded in 1973)
- Nothing Sacred (1978)
- Family Album (1978)
- Human Emotions (1978)
- Buckstone County Prison (Soundtrack) (1978)
- Spectrum VII (1979)
- Compass Point (1979)
- I've Got Something to Say (1980) (recorded in 1976)
- Invictus (Means) Unconquered (1981)
- Tennessee Whiskey (1981)
- Rough Rider (1982)
- D.A.C. (1982)
- Underground Album (with the David Allan Coe Band) (1982)
- Castles in the Sand (1983)
- Hello in There (1983)
- Just Divorced (1984)
- Darlin', Darlin' (1985)
- Unchained (1985)
- Son of the South (1986)
- A Matter of Life... and Death (1987)
- 1990 Songs for Sale (1990)
- Standing Too Close To the Flame (1993)
- Granny's Off Her Rocker (1993)
- Lonesome Fugitive (1994)
- The Perfect Country and Western Song (1994)
- Truckin' Outlaw (1994)
- 20 Road Music Hits (1996)
- The Ghost of Hank Williams (1997)
- Johnny Cash is a Friend of Mine (1998)
- Recommended for Airplay (1999)
- Long Haired Country Boy... And Other Such Songs (2000)
- Country & Western (2001)
- Rebel Meets Rebel (with Dimebag Darrell, Vinnie Paul and Rex Brown of Pantera) (2006)

=== Posthumous studio albums ===
- A Million Reasons (2026)

== Bibliography ==
- Just for the Record... the Autobiography
- The Book of David
- Ex-Convict
- Poems, Prose and Short Stories
- Psychopath
- "This is David Allan Coe"
- Whoopsy Daisy (audio book)
