= Hank Williams, You Wrote My Life (song) =

Single by Moe Bandy

from the album Hank Williams, You Wrote My Life
- B-side: "I'm The Honky-Tonk On Loser's Avenue"
- Released: November 1975
- Recorded: October 1975
- Genre: Country
- Length: 3:10
- Label: Columbia Records 3-10265
- Songwriter: Paul Craft
- Producer: Ray Baker

Moe Bandy singles chronology
"Bandy the Rodeo Clown" (1975)	"Hank Williams, You Wrote My Life" (1975)	"The Biggest Airport In the World" (1976)

"Hank Williams, You Wrote My Life " is a song written by Paul Craft and recorded by American country music artist Moe Bandy. It was released in late 1975 as the title track from his fourth album and was his first single after signing with Columbia Records.

== Background ==
Bandy had become a critically acclaimed artist, recording and performing in the honky-tonk style, during the previous two years while under contract with GRC Records. Songs such as ""I Just Started Hatin' Cheatin' Songs Today", "Honky-Tonk Amnesia", "It Was Always So Easy (To Find an Unhappy Woman)", and "Bandy the Rodeo Clown" became big country hits in 1974-1975, and his star power and reputation was increasing. By the fall of 1975, Bandy had signed a contract with Columbia Records, and one of the first songs he recorded was "Hank Williams, You Wrote My Life".

== Content ==
Bandy's earlier songs and method of putting across themes of heartbreak, lost love, and use of alcohol as solace showed his being influenced by Hank Williams, and that was furthered by "Hank Williams, You Wrote My Life". The song makes use of a number of Williams-penned and -recorded song titles in the lyrics ("You wrote 'Your Cheatin' Heart' about a gal like my first ex-wife/You moan the blues for me and for you/Hank Williams, you wrote my life") to express deep sorrow and sadness following a bitter breakup of a relationship. In addition to "Your Cheatin' Heart" and "Moanin' the Blues", song titles listed or referenced in the lyrics included "Cold, Cold Heart", "Half as Much", "I'm So Lonesome I Could Cry", "(I Heard That) Lonesome Whistle", and "The Blues Come Around."

== Chart performance ==
The song became Bandy's biggest hit yet, peaking at number two on the Billboard Hot Country Songs chart in February 1976.

=== Charts ===
Chart (1975–1976)	Peak position
US Hot Country Songs (Billboard)	2
Canadian RPM Country Tracks	3
