= Penitentiary Blues =

Studio album by David Allan Coe
- Released: 1970
- Recorded: Jan. 19 – Feb. 20, 1970, Singleton Sound Studio, Nashville, Tennessee
- Genre: Blues
- Length: 30:01
- Label: SSS International
- Producers: Shelby Singleton, Teddy Paige

David Allan Coe chronology
Penitentiary Blues (1970)	Requiem for a Harlequin (1970)

Penitentiary Blues is the debut album of American singer David Allan Coe. It was released in 1970 on SSS International Records.

== Style ==
The lyrics of Penitentiary Blues are often dark and foreshadow the content of Coe's later country albums, discussing themes such as working for the first time, blood tests from veins used to inject heroin, prison time, hoodoo imagery and death.

AllMusic's Thom Jurek describes the album's style as "voodoo blues", writing "This is redneck music, pure and simple, fresh out of hell and trying to communicate the giddiness of reprieve as well as its horrors to the listener."

The album derives influence from Charlie Rich, Jerry Lee Lewis, Bo Diddley, Lightnin' Hopkins, and Tony Joe White.

== Reception ==
Professional ratings
Review scores
Source	Rating
AllMusic	3/5 stars

Allmusic's Thom Jurek wrote, "There are hints and traces of the lyrical genius Coe would display later, but taken as a whole, Penitentiary is thoroughly enjoyable as a rowdy, funky, and crude blues record full of out-of-tune guitars, slippery performances, and an attitude of 'fuck it, let's get it done and get it out,' which was a trademark of Plantation Records during the era."

== Track listing ==
All Songs written by David Allan Coe except where noted.

1. "Penitentiary Blues" – 3:11
2. "Cell #33" (Coe, Teddy Paige) – 2:13
3. "Monkey David Wine" – 3:00
4. "Walkin' Bum" (Hank Mills) – 3:36
5. "One Way Ticket To Nowhere" (Coe, Betty Coe, Teddy Paige, Cliff Parker) 2:46
6. "Funeral Parlor Blues" (Coe, Betty Coe, Teddy Paige) – 3:12
7. "Death Row" – 2:44
8. "Oh Warden" (Coe, Teddy Paige) – 2:45
9. "Age 21" – 2:06
10. "Little David" – 2:12
11. "Conjer Man" – 2:09

== Personnel ==
- David Allan Coe – vocals
- Teddy Paige, Jerry Kennedy, Mac Gayden – guitar
- Teddy Paige, Charlie McCoy, Ed Kollis – harmonica
- William C. Sanders, Billy Linneman, Mac Gayden, Charlie McCoy – bass
- Karl Himmel, Kenneth Buttrey – drums
- David Briggs – piano
- Teddy Paige, Shelby S. Singleton, Jr. – production
- Joe Venneri – engineering
- Gayle Allen – photography
