= Easyriders =

American motorcycle magazine

- First issue, June 1971
- Frequency: Monthly
- Circulation: 123,587
- Publisher: Joe Teresi
- Founder: Lou Kimzey, Joe Teresi, Mil Blair
- Founded: 1970
- Country: United States
- Based in: Agoura Hills, California
- Language: English
- Website: www.easyriders.com

Easyriders is an American motorcycle magazine, founded in 1970. It was published monthly by Paisano Publications for over 50 years.

Throughout the 1970s and 1980s, the publication served as a primary chronicle for both the mechanical evolution and the distinct counterculture lifestyle of the American chopper movement. Culturally, it documented the post-Vietnam War veteran motorcycle club scene, anti-establishment social themes, and specialized biker art—prominently featuring the illustrations and paintings by Rick Griffin and David Mann who was a California graphic artist whose paintings celebrated biker culturea. Easyriders is also known for including pictures of nude or topless women

The December 1979 issue featured an interview with Willie Nelson, who also appeared on the cover.

Technically, the magazine profiled the period's rapid advancements in custom fabrication, covering specialized paint applications, frame stretching, and early seating designs. It also ran in-depth retrospectives on the aftermarket drivetrain shifts that transformed the industry, notably the collaborative engineering of synchronous dual-belt drive setups pioneered by independent fabricators such as Dick Allen, Karata Enterprises, Rivera Engineering, and SuperMax Products.

The Audit Bureau of Circulation reported that Easyriders had an average paid and verified circulation of 123,587 for the six-month period ending December 31, 2007.

== Spin-off ==
In 1979, Paisano launched a companion publication called Iron Horse, which would continue for many years under various owners.
