= Weldon Myrick =

American steel guitar player

Weldon Myrick (born Weldon Merle Myrick; April 10, 1938 – June 2, 2014) was an American steel guitarist.

Myrick was born in Jayton, Texas. His debut came in 1964, when he played on the #1 country hit "Once a Day" by Connie Smith. She would call Myrick "the guy who was responsible for creating the Connie Smith sound."

In the late 1960s, he joined Bobby Thompson and Charlie McCoy to form Area Code 615.

He was also a member of the group of session musicians in the Nashville, Tennessee-based group The Nashville A-Team. They backed many singers, including Eddy Arnold, Jim Reeves, Bob Dylan, Gary Stewart, Moon Mullican, and Jerry Lee Lewis.

He died in 2014, at the age of 76, after suffering a stroke.

== Area Code 615 discography ==
- Area Code 615, 1969
- Trip in the Country, 1970

== Discography as a session player ==
* "Connie Smith (1965 album)", Connie Smith, 1965
- Browns Sing the Big Ones from Country, The Browns, 1967
- Make Mine Country, Charley Pride, 1968
- Wildweeds, Wildweeds, 1970
- Come from the Shadows, Joan Baez, 1972
- Home Free, Dan Fogelberg, 1972
- Jesus Was a Capricorn, Kris Kristofferson, 1972
- Linda Ronstadt, Linda Ronstadt, 1972
- Dennis Linde, Dennis Linde, 1973
- Drift Away, Dobie Gray, 1973
- Tom Jans, Tom Jans, 1974
- Superpickers, Chet Atkins, 1974
- That's A Plenty, The Pointer Sisters, 1974
- Breakaway, Kris Kristofferson and Rita Coolidge, 1974
- Tattoo, David Allan Coe, 1977
- From a Radio Engine to the Photon Wing, Michael Nesmith, 1977
- Family Album, David Allan Coe, 1978
- Three on the Trail, Riders in the Sky, 1979
- The Champ, Moe Bandy, 1980
- Feel the Fire, Reba McEntire, 1980
- The Baron, Johnny Cash, 1981
- Heart to Heart, Reba McEntire, 1981
- One of a Kind, Moe Bandy, 1982
- Unlimited, Reba McEntire, 1982
- Bobbie Sue, The Oak Ridge Boys, 1982
- #8, J.J.Cale, 1983
- Somebody's Gonna Love You, Lee Greenwood, 1983
- Behind the Scene, Reba McEntire, 1983
- Just a Little Love, Reba McEntire, 1984
- Does Fort Worth Ever Cross Your Mind, George Strait, 1984
- Have I Got a Deal for You, Reba McEntire, 1985
- Just a Woman, Loretta Lynn, 1985
- Paper Roses, Marie Osmond, 1973
- In My Little Corner of the World, Marie Osmond, 1974
- Who's Sorry Now, Marie Osmond, 1975
- Whoever's in New England, Reba McEntire, 1986
- Who Was That Stranger, Loretta Lynn, 1988
- At This Moment, Neal McCoy, 1990
- Here in the Real World, Alan Jackson, 1990
- Greatest Hits, Vol. 3, Ronnie Milsap, 1991
- You've Got to Stand for Something, Aaron Tippin, 1991
- Maybe the Moon Will Shine, Marsha Thornton, 1991
- Western Underground, Chris LeDoux, 1991
- A Lot About Livin' (And a Little 'bout Love), Alan Jackson, 1992
- In This Life, Collin Raye, 1992
- Delta Dreamland, Deborah Allen, 1993
- Honky Tonk Angels, Dolly Parton, Loretta Lynn, and Tammy Wynette, 1993
- If Only My Heart Had a Voice, Kenny Rogers, 1993
