= Kenny Malone =

American drummer and percussionist (1938–2021)

Kenny Malone (August 4, 1938 – August 26, 2021) was an American drummer and percussionist.

== Life and career ==
Malone was born in Denver, Colorado. From the 1970s onwards, he was a prominent session musician in folk, country and many other acoustic-based genres. He was known for inventing his own style of hand drumming.

Throughout his career, Malone was asked to record for artists such as Carl Perkins, Ray Charles, George Jones, Janie Fricke, Johnny Cash, Don Williams, Dobie Gray, Donna Fargo, David Allan Coe, Merle Haggard, The Whites, Crystal Gayle, Charley Pride, Moe Bandy, Floyd Cramer, Dr. Hook, Barbara Mandrell, Johnny Paycheck, Kenny Rogers, Michael Johnson, Dottie West, Lynn Anderson, John Hartford, New Grass Revival, Béla Fleck, Barefoot Jerry, B.J. Thomas, Bobby Bare, Emmylou Harris, Ricky Skaggs, J. J. Cale, John Anderson, Dolly Parton, and Lacy J. Dalton. He provided percussion on the hits "Jolene" by Dolly Parton in 1973, and "Don't It Make My Brown Eyes Blue" by Crystal Gayle in 1977.

He died from COVID-19 on August 26, 2021, at age 83, during the COVID-19 pandemic in Tennessee.
