= I Don't Wanna Talk It Over Anymore =

Studio album by Connie Smith
- Released: October 1976
- Recorded: February 26 – April 14, 1976
- Studios: Columbia Studio B; RCA Studio B
- Genres: Country; country pop
- Label: Columbia
- Producer: Ray Baker

Connie Smith chronology
The Song We Fell in Love To (1976)	I Don't Wanna Talk It Over Anymore (1976)	Pure Connie Smith (1977)

Singles from I Don't Wanna Talk It Over Anymore
- 1. "So Sad (To Watch Good Love Go Bad)" Released: May 1976; 2. "I Don't Wanna Talk It Over Anymore" Released: October 1976; 3. "The Latest Shade of Blue" Released: February 1977

I Don't Wanna Talk It Over Anymore is the twenty-eighth solo studio album by American country singer Connie Smith. It was released in October 1976 and contained ten tracks. The project's name was derived from the title track, which was one of three singles included. Its other single releases included a cover The Everly Brothers's "So Sad (To Watch Good Love Go Bad)" and an original tune called "The Latest Shade of Blue". The title track was the album's most successful single, placing in the top 20 of the American country songs chart. The album received a positive response from Billboard magazine following its release. It was also Smith's final studio project released with the Columbia label.

== Background ==
Connie Smith reached her commercial peak at RCA Victor, having a 18 top ten country singles between 1964 and 1973. She then signed a new contract with Columbia Records in the mid 1970s, which provided her more artistic freedom. Although past her career peak, Smith continued having top 20 (and occasionally top ten) songs through the decade. Smith's most successful Columbia singles included "Ain't Love a Good Thing" (1973), "I Never Knew (What That Song Meant Before)" (1974), "I've Got My Baby on My Mind" (1974), "Why Don't You Love Me" (1975) and "(Till) I Kissed You" (1976). Columbia issued eight Connie Smith studio albums since 1973. She began making her final Columbia album in early 1976, which would later be titled I Don't Wanna Talk It Over Anymore.

== Recording and content ==
The sessions for I Don't Wanna Talk It Over Anymore took place over four 1976 studio sessions: February 26, March 18, March 24 and April 14. Two of these sessions were held at RCA Studio B, which Smith had previously recorded at during her earliest studio sessions for RCA Victor in the 1960s. According to Smith, RCA Studio B was her favorite studio to record in. The other two sessions were held at Columbia Studio B, where Smith had previously recorded all her songs at. The sessions were produced by Ray Baker. Baker had served as Smith's producer since 1973. A total of ten tracks comprised the album project. The album's title track and "The Latest Shade of Blue" were written by singer-songwriter, Eddy Raven. He had begun pitching Smith songs for her previous album (also released in 1976) titled The Song We Fell in Love To. "Eddie had some of the best records – the sound, the songs, his singing. Then he started to come into the studio to bring me songs," she recalled.

Along with Raven's two compositions, the project featured a track penned by Don Gibson titled "I'm All Wrapped Up in You". It also featured a gospel tune penned by Dottie Rambo called "I Wonder If the Angels Could Use Another Singer". The album also included a self-penned track by Smith herself called "Constantly". The song was first composed by Smith before becoming famous. "With this one, I was in the kitchen, cooking, and my mama was staying with me and the kids for a few days, and I started writing it," she told biographer Barry Mazor. Covers of previously recorded songs were also featured. Among them was Smith's version of The Everly Brothers's "So Sad (To Watch Good Love God Bad)". It was her second cover of an Everly Brothers song. On The Song We Fell in Love To, Smith recorded the duo's pop hit "(Till) I Kissed You". She also covered Jessi Colter's original tune, "Storms Never Last". Smith slightly modified the lyrics on the chorus of the song.

== Release, reception and singles ==
I Don't Wanna Talk It Over Anymore was released in October 1976 on Columbia Records. It was the thirtieth studio album of Smith's career and her ninth with the Columbia label. It was distributed as a vinyl LP, containing five songs on each side of the record. Billboard magazine gave the album a positive review in 1976, highlighting Ray Baker's production and noting a "career resurgence" for Smith. "Styles range from hard driving country to Smith's gospel leanings. Variety and pace keep the effort interesting and add to the cut-by-cut flow," the magazine added. The album entered America's Billboard Country LP's chart on November 6, 1976. It spent seven weeks on the chart and peaked at the number 33 position on November 27. It is Smith's final album to date to reach a charting position on the country albums survey.

Three singles were included and spawned from the album. Its first was Smith's cover of "So Sad (To Watch Good Love Go Bad)", which was released by Columbia Records in May 1976. The single reached number 31 on the Billboard Hot Country Songs chart by July 1976. The title track was then released as a single in August 1976. By October, it became her next top 20 hit, peaking at number 13 of the Hot Country Songs chart. The final single issued from the album would be "The Latest Shade of Blue", released by Columbia in 1977. It was Smith's final single for the label. It reached number 42 on the Country Songs chart in April 1977, becoming her second single to place outside the top 40 in her career.

== Track listing ==
Side one
No.	Title	Writer(s)	Length
1.	"So Sad (To Watch Good Love Go Bad)"	Don Everly	2:22
2.	"Love Don't Care (Where It Grows)"	Tupper Saussy	2:49
3.	"Come on Down"	Jack Hayford; Steve Stone	3:34
4.	"Storms Never Last"	Jessi Colter	3:23
5.	"Constantly"	Connie Smith	3:29

Side two
No.	Title	Writer(s)	Length
1.	"I Don't Wanna Talk It Over Anymore"	Eddy Raven	2:50
2.	"The Latest Shade of Blue"	Raven	2:51
3.	"I'm All Wrapped Up in You"	Don Gibson	2:20
4.	"You Crossed My Mind a Thousand Times Today"	Dewayne Orender; Phyllis Powell	3:06
5.	"I Wonder If the Angels Could Use Another Singer"	Dottie Rambo	2:30

== Personnel ==
All credits are adapted from the liner notes of I Don't Wanna Talk It Over Anymore and the biography booklet by Barry Mazor titled The Latest Shade of Blue.

Musical personnel

- Brenton Banks – Strings
- George Binkley III – Strings
- Jerry Carrigan – Drums
- Marvin Chantry – Strings
- Roy Christensen – Strings
- Jimmy Day – Steel guitar
- Ray Edenton – Rhythm guitar
- Buddy Emmons – Steel guitar
- Johnny Gimble – Fiddle
- Carl Gorodetzky – Strings
- Lloyd Green – Steel guitar
- Lennie Haight – Strings
- Leo Jackson – Rhythm guitar
- The Jordanaires – Background vocals
- Shayne Keister – Piano
- Billy Linneman – Electric bass
- Grady Martin – Guitar
- Charlie McCoy – Harmonica, leader
- Martha McCrory – Strings
- Bob Moore – Electric bass
- The Nashville Edition – Background vocals
- Leon Rhodes – Guitar
- Hargus "Pig" Robbins – Piano
- Billy Sanford – Guitar
- Connie Smith – Lead vocals
- Jerry Smith – Piano
- Henry Strzelecki – Electric bass
- Donald Teal, Jr. – Strings
- Bobby Thompson – Guitar
- Gary Van Osdale – Strings
- Stephanie Woolf – Strings
- Reggie Young – Guitar

Technical personnel

- Ray Baker – Percussion, producer
- Bill Barnes – Design
- Charlie Bradley – Back-up engineer
- Lou Bradley – Engineer
- Al Clayton – Photography
- Shelly Kurland – String leader
- Slick Lawson – Cover photo
- Cheryl Pardue – Design
- John Ragsdale – Arranger
- Ron Reynolds – Engineer

== Chart performance ==
Chart (1976)	Peak position
US Top Country Albums (Billboard)	33

== Release history ==
Region	Date	Format	Label	Ref.
North America	October 1976	Vinyl	Columbia Records	
