= The Voice (American TV series) season 15 =

The Voice
- Season 15
- Promotional poster featuring coaches Hudson, Shelton, Levine, and Clarkson
- Hosted by: Carson Daly
- Coaches: Adam Levine; Kelly Clarkson; Jennifer Hudson; Blake Shelton; Kelsea Ballerini (Comeback Stage)
- No. of contestants: 54 artists
- Winner: Chevel Shepherd
- Winning coach: Kelly Clarkson
- Runner-up: Chris Kroeze
- No. of episodes: 26

Release
- Original network: NBC
- Original release: September 24 – December 18, 2018

Season chronology
- ← Previous; Season 14 Next → Season 16

The fifteenth season of the American reality television show, The Voice premiered on September 24, 2018, on NBC. Adam Levine, Kelly Clarkson, and Blake Shelton returned as coaches (fifteenth, second, and fifteenth seasons respectively) from the previous season. Jennifer Hudson, who last coached in season 13, returned for her second season replacing Alicia Keys. For the first time in its history, the show featured a fifth coach, Kelsea Ballerini, who selected contestants to participate in The Comeback Stage.

While the Block made a return from the last season, this season introduced "The Comeback Stage", a digital companion series where six artists eliminated from the Blind Auditions coached by Kelsea Ballerini pitted in a series of Battles for a place in the Top 13.

Chevel Shepherd was named winner of this season, marking Kelly Clarkson's second win as a coach, and making her the first female coach to win multiple seasons (and the third overall coach, after Shelton and Levine). Clarkson also became the second coach in the show's history to win multiple consecutive seasons of The Voice, after Shelton who won from seasons two to four of the show.

== Coaches and hosts ==
Coaches and Host of The Voice Season 15

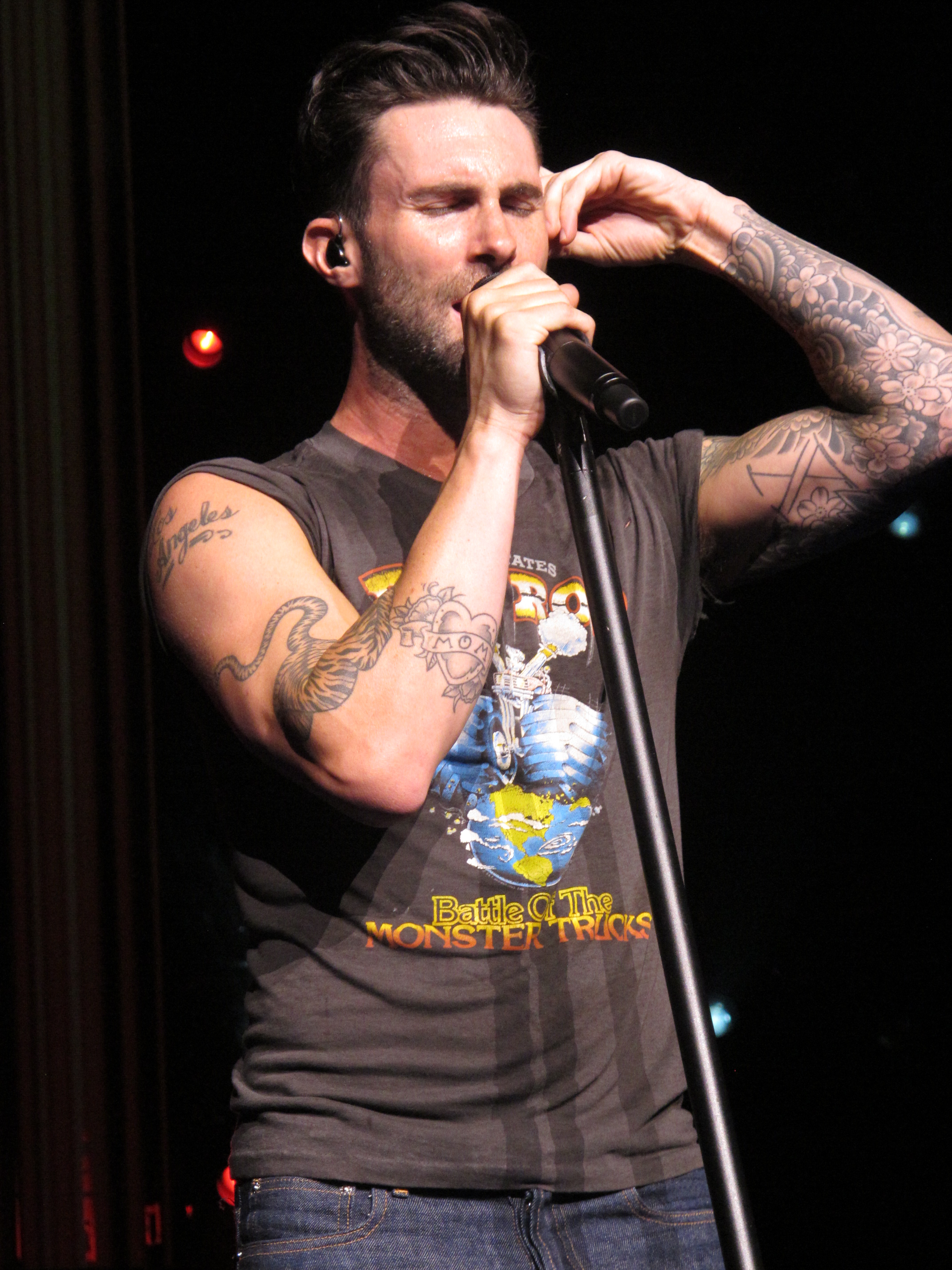
Adam Levine

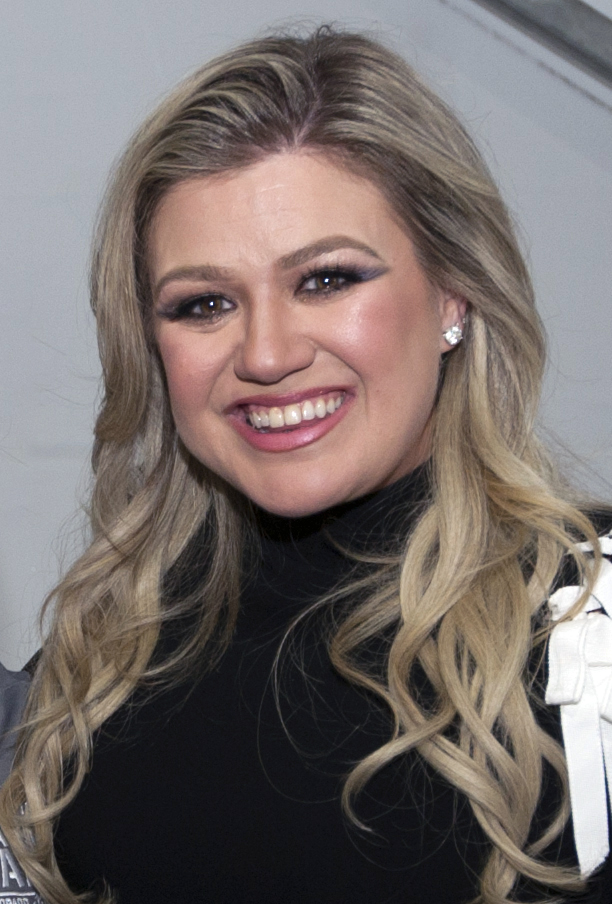
Kelly Clarkson

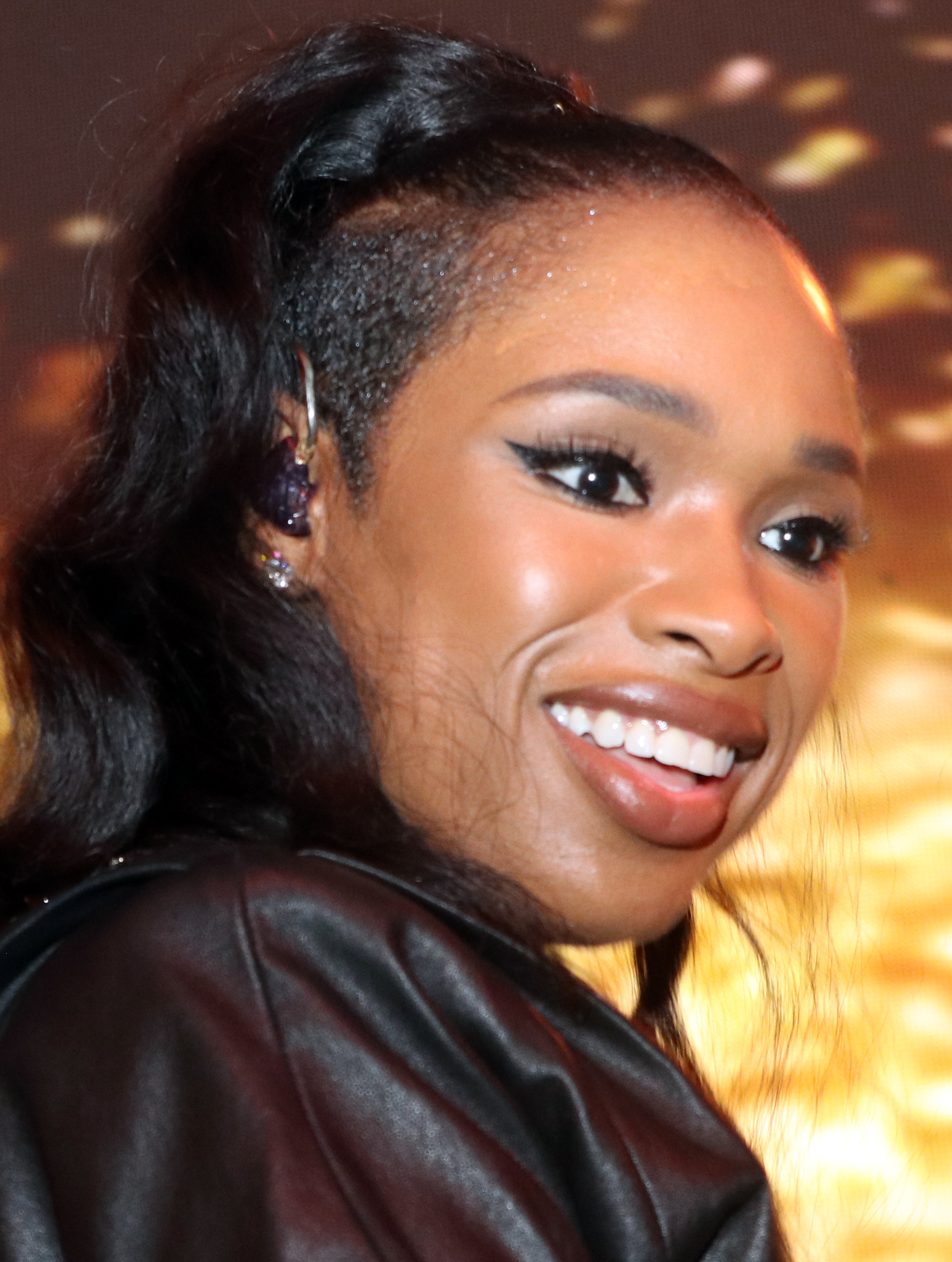
Jennifer Hudson

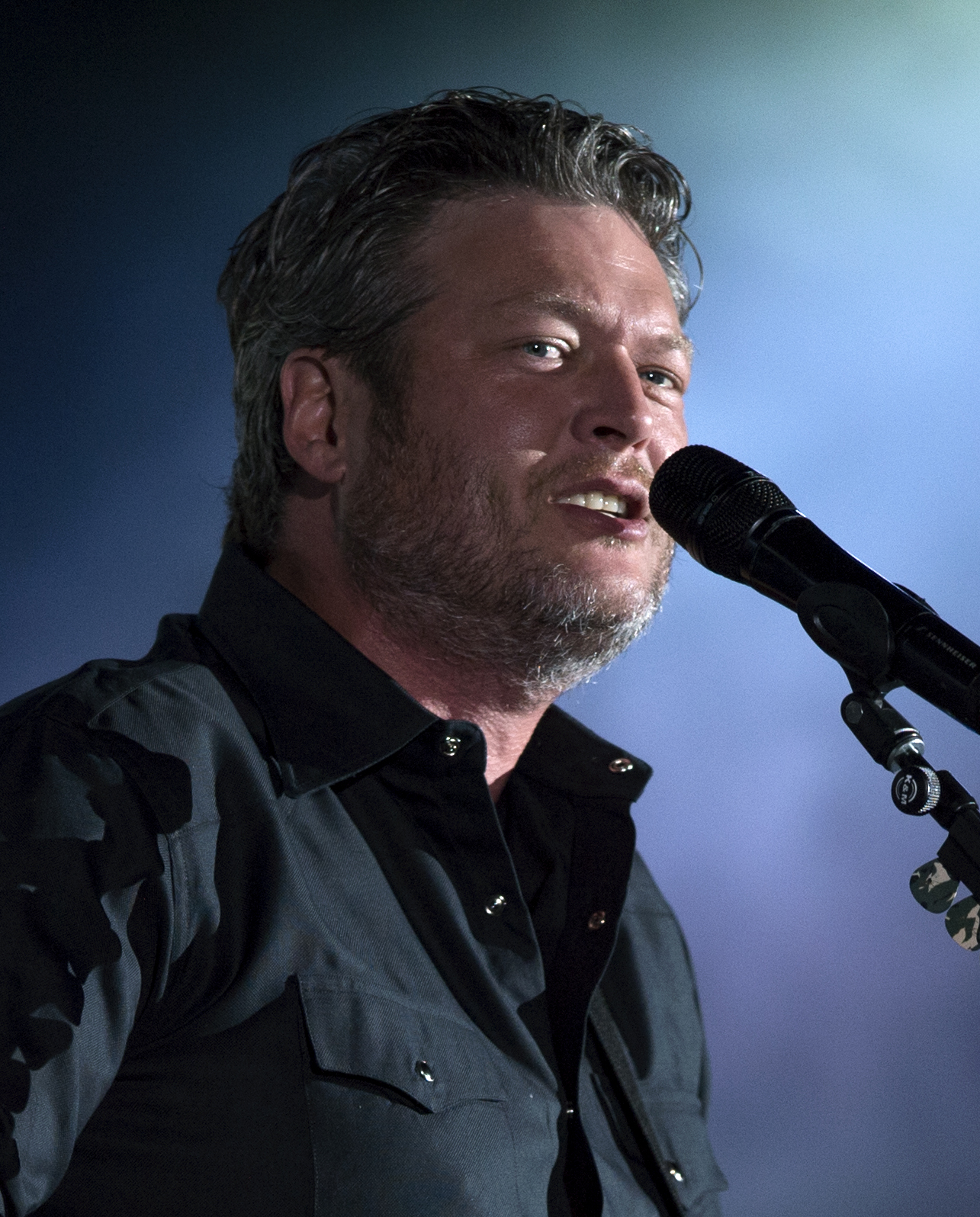
Blake Shelton

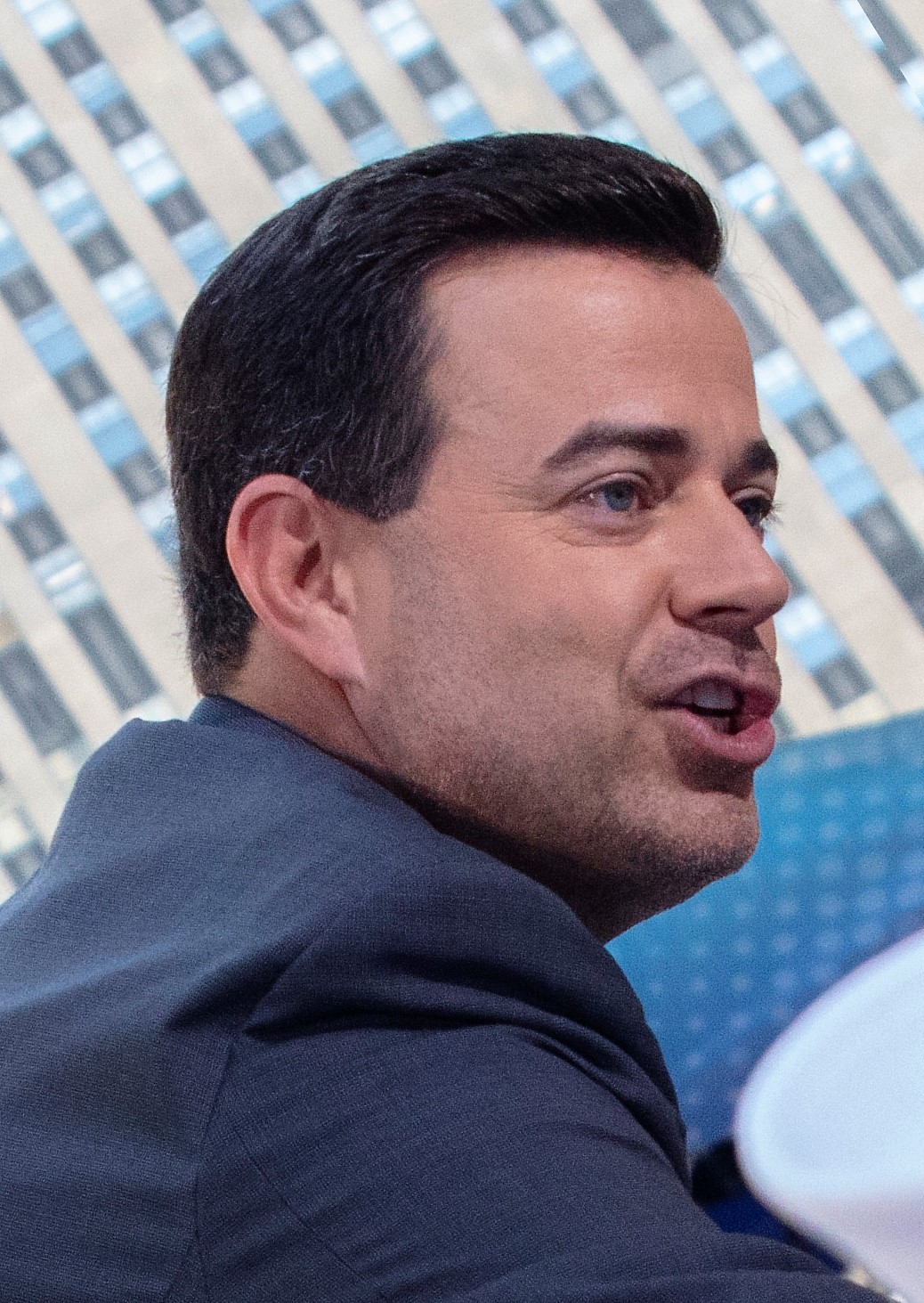
Carson Daly

On May 11, 2018, Kelly Clarkson confirmed she would return alongside coach veterans, Adam Levine, and Blake Shelton with Jennifer Hudson who returns after a one-season hiatus. Carson Daly returned for his fifteenth season as host. It was announced on September 10 that Kelsea Ballerini would become a fifth coach, mentoring unsuccessful auditioners on an online version in a new round called The Comeback Stage.

This season's advisors for the Battle Rounds were CeeLo Green for Team Adam, Thomas Rhett for Team Kelly, Halsey for Team Jennifer, and Keith Urban for Team Blake. Mariah Carey was assigned as a mentor for all teams during the knockouts.

== Teams ==
Color key

- Winner
- Runner-up
- Third place
- Fourth place
- Eliminated in Live Shows
- Joined another team
- Eliminated in the Live Playoffs
- Stolen in the Knockout rounds
- Eliminated in The Knockouts
- Stolen in the Battle rounds
- Eliminated in the Battle rounds
- Withdrew

Coaches	Top 54 artists					
Adam Levine						
Adam Levine	Reagan Strange	DeAndre Nico	Tyke James	Kameron Marlowe	Steve Memmolo	RADHA Martinez
Adam Levine	~~Keith Paluso~~	Delaney Silvernell	Jake Wells	~~Anthony Arya~~	~~Funsho~~	Natalie Brady
Adam Levine	Fousheé	Emily Hough	Jarred Matthew			
Kelly Clarkson						
Kelly Clarkson	Chevel Shepherd	Sarah Grace	Kymberli Joye	Lynnea Moorer	Abby Cates	Keith Paluso
Kelly Clarkson	Zaxai	~~Natasia GreyCloud~~	Claire DeJean	Cody Ray Raymond	~~SandyRedd~~	~~Delaney Silvernell~~
Kelly Clarkson	Mikele Buck	Josh Davis	OneUp	Erika Zade		
Jennifer Hudson						
Jennifer Hudson	Kennedy Holmes	MaKenzie Thomas	SandyRedd	Patrique Fortson	Colton Smith	Franc West
Jennifer Hudson	Anthony Arya	Tyshawn Colquitt	Mike Parker	~~Natasia GreyCloud~~	~~Colton Smith~~	~~Zaxai~~
Jennifer Hudson	Audri Bartholomew	Matt Johnson	Lela Restrepo			
Blake Shelton						
Blake Shelton	Chris Kroeze	Kirk Jay	Dave Fenley	Funsho	Natasia GreyCloud	Michael Lee
Blake Shelton	~~Kameron Marlowe~~	~~Colton Smith~~	Katrina Cain	~~Keith Paluso~~	Mercedes Ferreira-Dias	Caeland Garner
Blake Shelton	Joey Green	Kayley Hill	Rachel Messer			
Kelsea Ballerini						
Kelsea Ballerini	~~Lynnea Moorer~~	Ayanna Joni	Wyatt Rivers	Madison Cain	Ele Ivory	Sam Robbins
Note: Italicized names are stolen artists (names struck through within former teams). Underlined names are artists who were saved by their coach in the Knockouts and advanced to the Live Playoffs. The Bold name is the artist who won The Comeback Stage and joined another team of their choosing (name struck through within former team).

== Blind auditions ==
Color key

✔	Coach pressed "I WANT YOU" button
	Artist defaulted to a coach's team
	Artist selected to join this coach's team
	Artist was eliminated and was not invited back for "The Comeback Stage"
	Artist was eliminated, but got a second chance to compete in "The Comeback Stage"
✘	Coach pressed "I WANT YOU" button, but was blocked by another coach from getting the artist
	Blocked by Adam; Blocked by Kelly; Blocked by JHud; Blocked by Blake

Cody Ray Raymond is the 1000th blind audition of this series.

=== Episode 1 (Sept. 24) ===
Among the auditionees this episode was Mercedes Ferreira-Dias, who previously auditioned unsuccessfully in the previous season.

Order	Artist	Age	Hometown	Song	Coach's and artist's choices			
Order	Artist	Age	Hometown	Song	Adam	Kelly	Jennifer	Blake
1	Sarah Grace	15	Houston, Texas	"Ball and Chain"	—	✔	✔	✔
2	Tyshawn Colquitt	23	Cincinnati, Ohio	"Like I Can"	—	—	✔	✔
3	Tyke James	17	Laie, Hawaii	"Perfect"	✔	—	—	—
4	Ayanna Joni	29	Yonkers, New York	"Sorry Not Sorry"	—	—	—	—
5	Mercedes Ferreira-Dias	17	Miami, Florida	"She Used to Be Mine"	—	✔	—	✔
6	RADHA	19	Jersey City, New Jersey	"Mamma Knows Best"	✔	—	✘	✔
7	Kameron Marlowe	21	Kannapolis, North Carolina	"One Number Away"	—	✔	—	✔
8	Mikele Buck	39	Big Chimney, West Virginia	"She Used to Be Mine"	—	✔	—	✔
9	Sam Hastings	23	Portland, Maine	"Angela"	—	—	—	—
10	Patrique Fortson	38	Atlanta, Georgia	"Get Here"	✔	—	✔	—
11	Kennedy Holmes	13	St. Louis, Missouri	"Turning Tables"	✔	✔	✔	✔

=== Episode 2 (Sept. 25) ===
Order	Artist	Age	Hometown	Song	Coach's and artist's choices			
Order	Artist	Age	Hometown	Song	Adam	Kelly	Jennifer	Blake
1	Keith Paluso	30	Memphis, Tennessee	"Way Down We Go"	✘	—	—	✔
2	Claire DeJean	17	Dallas, Texas	"Hurt Somebody"	—	✔	—	✔
3	Franc West	38	Cleveland, Ohio	"(Sittin' On) The Dock of the Bay"	—	—	✔	—
4	Michael Lee	30	Fort Worth, Texas	"The Thrill Is Gone"	✔	—	✔	✔
5	Ele Ivory	20	Nashville, Tennessee	"Jump"	—	—	—	—
6	DeAndre Nico	22	Port Arthur, Texas	"When I Was Your Man"	✔	✔	✔	✔

=== Episode 3 (Oct. 1) ===
Order	Artist	Age	Hometown	Song	Coach's and artist's choices			
Order	Artist	Age	Hometown	Song	Adam	Kelly	Jennifer	Blake
1	Dave Fenley	39	Nashville, Tennessee	"Help Me Hold On"	—	✔	—	✔
2	Steve Memmolo	35	Boston, Massachusetts	"Spooky"	✔	—	✔	—
3	Audri Bartholomew	19	St. Louis, Missouri	"Never Enough"	—	—	✔	—
4	Rachel Messer	19	Fort Gay, West Virginia	"I Want to Be a Cowboy's Sweetheart"	—	✔	—	✔
5	Brent Morgan	30	Madison, Alabama	"Feel It Still"	—	—	—	—
6	Chevel Shepherd	16	Farmington, New Mexico	"If I Die Young"	—	✔	✔	✔
7	Bryan Cherry	28	Woodbridge, Virginia	"Nothing Can Change This Love"	—	—	—	—
8	Delaney Silvernell	21	Los Angeles, California	"In My Blood"	—	✔	—	—
9	Anthony Arya	15	Santa Cruz, California	"Danny's Song"	✔	—	—	—
10	Natasia GreyCloud (Natasia Thomason Bohl)	29	Nashville, Tennessee	"I'm Not the Only One"	—	✔	✔	—
11	Lynnea Moorer	18	Monterey, California	"Location"	—	—	—	—
12	Kymberli Joye	26	Windsor, Connecticut	"Run to You"	—	✔	✘	✔

=== Episode 4 (Oct. 2) ===
Order	Artist	Age	Hometown	Song	Coach's and artist's choices			
Order	Artist	Age	Hometown	Song	Adam	Kelly	Jennifer	Blake
1	Reagan Strange	13	Memphis, Tennessee	"Meant to Be"	✔	—	—	✔
2	Fousheé (Brittney Foushee)	29	Harlem, New York	"Redbone"	✔	—	✔	—
3	Wyatt Rivers	22	Durham, North Carolina	"River"	—	—	—	—
4	Chris Kroeze	27	Barron, Wisconsin	"Pride and Joy"	—	—	✔	✔
5	MaKenzie Thomas	20	Wallingford, Kentucky	"Big White Room"	—	—	✔	—
6	SandyRedd (Melinda Bussie)	35	Chicago, Illinois	"River"	✔	✔	✔	✔

=== Episode 5 (Oct. 8) ===
Order	Artist	Age	Hometown	Song	Coach's and artist's choices			
Order	Artist	Age	Hometown	Song	Adam	Kelly	JHud	Blake
1	OneUp (Adam Bastien & Jerome Bell)	35–36	New York City, New York	"Could It Be I'm Falling In Love"	—	✔	✔	✔
2	Natalie Brady	33	Nashville, Tennessee	"Barracuda"	✔	—	✔	—
3	Hannah Blaylock	31	Nimmons, Arkansas	"Baby, Now That I've Found You"	—	—	—	—
4	Mike Parker	23	Warrenton, Virginia	"So Sick"	—	—	✔	—
5	Joey Green	35	Crowley, Texas	"Baba O'Riley"	—	—	✔	✔
6	Zaxai Pierre	29	Brooklyn, New York	"Come and Get Your Love"	—	✘	✔	—
7	Erika Zade	20	Miami, Florida	"New Rules"	—	✔	—	—
8	Jarred Matthew	31	Riverside, California	"Tired of Being Alone"	✔	—	—	✔
9	Sam Robbins	21	Portsmouth, New Hampshire	"Time in a Bottle"	—	—	—	—
10	Colton Smith	21	Albertville, Alabama	"Alive"	—	—	✔	—
11	Kayley Hill	28	Nashville, Tennessee	"Gold Dust Woman"	—	—	—	✔
12	Kirk Jay	22	Bay Minette, Alabama	"Bless the Broken Road"	✔	✔	✔	✔

=== Episode 6 (Oct. 9) ===
Among the auditionees this episode was Cody Ray Raymond, the 1000th blind audition of the series.

Order	Artist	Age	Hometown	Song	Coach's and artist's choices			
Order	Artist	Age	Hometown	Song	Adam	Kelly	Jennifer	Blake
1	Caeland Garner	31	Coleridge, North Carolina	"Dancing in the Moonlight"	—	—	✔	✔
2	Madison Cain	24	Sausalito, California	"You Oughta Know"	—	—	—	—
3	Lela (Pamela Restrepo)	15	Miami, Florida	"Havana"	—	✔	✔	—
4	Cody Ray Raymond	27	Seattle, Washington	"Born Under a Bad Sign"	—	✔	✔	—
5	Jake Wells	23	Kansas City, Missouri	"When the Stars Go Blue"	✔	—	—	—
6	Abby Cates	17	Cincinnati, Ohio	"Scars to Your Beautiful"	—	✔	—	—
7	Funsho (Funsho Adenungba)	29	Lagos, Nigeria / Los Angeles, California	"Finesse"	✔	✔	✔	—

=== Episode 7 (Oct. 15) ===
Order	Artist	Age	Hometown	Song	Coach's and artist's choices			
Order	Artist	Age	Hometown	Song	Adam	Kelly	Jennifer	Blake
1	Emily Hough	16	Petersburg, Illinois	"Big Yellow Taxi"	✔	—	✔	✔
2	Josh Davis	20	Cleveland, Tennessee	"Too Good At Goodbyes"	Team full	✔	✔	—
3	Lisa Ramey	33	New York City, New York	"Beautiful Trauma"	Team full	Team full	—	—
4	Katrina Cain	29	Denton, Texas	"Rhiannon"	Team full	Team full	✔	✔
5	Matt Johnson	26	Staunton, Virginia	"Never Too Much"	Team full	Team full	✔	Team full

== The Battles ==
The second half of the Battle Rounds started on October 15. Season fifteen's advisors include: CeeLo Green for Team Adam, Thomas Rhett for Team Kelly, Halsey for Team Jennifer, and Keith Urban for Team Blake. The coaches can steal two losing artists from other coaches. Contestants who win their battle or are stolen by another coach will advance to the Knockout rounds.

During a commercial break before the last pairing in Part 1 of the Battles, the four coaches (Kelly, J.Hud, Adam, Blake) gave the waiting audience an impromptu performance with an a cappella version of The Golden Girls' theme song - "Thank You for Being a Friend".

Color key:

Artist won the Battle and advanced to the Knockouts
Artist lost the Battle but was stolen by another coach and advanced to the Knockouts
Artist lost the Battle and was eliminated

Episode	Coach	Order	Winner	Song	Loser	'Steal' result			
Episode	Coach	Order	Winner	Song	Loser	Adam	Kelly	Jennifer	Blake
Episode 7 (Monday, Oct. 15, 2018)	Kelly Clarkson	1	Cody Ray Raymond	"Cry to Me"	SandyRedd	✔	—N/a	✔	✔
Episode 7 (Monday, Oct. 15, 2018)	Blake Shelton	2	Michael Lee	"Thing Called Love"	Joey Green	—	—	—	—N/a
Episode 7 (Monday, Oct. 15, 2018)	Jennifer Hudson	3	Patrique Fortson	"God Gave Me You"	Colton Smith	—	—	—N/a	✔
Episode 8 (Tuesday, Oct. 16, 2018)	Kelly Clarkson	1	Kymberli Joye	"Mercy"	OneUp	—	—N/a	—	—
Episode 8 (Tuesday, Oct. 16, 2018)	Adam Levine	2	Steve Memmolo	"Amie"	Anthony Arya	—N/a	—	✔	—
Episode 8 (Tuesday, Oct. 16, 2018)	Adam Levine	3	Tyke James	"She's Always a Woman"	Jarred Matthew	—N/a	—	Team full	—
Episode 8 (Tuesday, Oct. 16, 2018)	Blake Shelton	4	Chris Kroeze	"Back in the High Life Again"	Mercedes Ferreira-Dias	—	—	Team full	—N/a
Episode 8 (Tuesday, Oct. 16, 2018)	Blake Shelton	5	Katrina Cain	"Angel"	Rachel Messer	—	—	Team full	—N/a
Episode 8 (Tuesday, Oct. 16, 2018)	Jennifer Hudson	6	Mike Parker	"Gravity"	Natasia GreyCloud	—	✔	Team full	—
Episode 9 (Monday, Oct. 22, 2018)	Blake Shelton	1	Dave Fenley	"I'm a One-Woman Man"	Keith Paluso	✔	—	Team full	—N/a
Episode 9 (Monday, Oct. 22, 2018)	Adam Levine	2	Reagan Strange	"Photograph"	Emily Hough	—N/a	—	Team full	—
Episode 9 (Monday, Oct. 22, 2018)	Jennifer Hudson	3	Franc West	"Too Close"	Matt Johnson	—	—	Team full	—
Episode 9 (Monday, Oct. 22, 2018)	Kelly Clarkson	4	Abby Cates	"Love Me like You Do"	Delaney Silvernell	✔	—N/a	Team full	—
Episode 9 (Monday, Oct. 22, 2018)	Adam Levine	5	RADHA	"Growing Pains"	Fousheé	Team full	—	Team full	—
Episode 9 (Monday, Oct. 22, 2018)	Kelly Clarkson	6	Chevel Shepherd	"You Look So Good in Love"	Mikele Buck	Team full	—N/a	Team full	—
Episode 9 (Monday, Oct. 22, 2018)	Jennifer Hudson	7	MaKenzie Thomas	"Always Be My Baby"	Audri Bartholomew	Team full	—	Team full	—
Episode 9 (Monday, Oct. 22, 2018)	Adam Levine	8	Jake Wells	"Closing Time"	Natalie Brady	Team full	—	Team full	—
Episode 9 (Monday, Oct. 22, 2018)	Jennifer Hudson	9	Tyshawn Colquitt	"Love Lies"	Zaxai	Team full	✔	Team full	—
Episode 10 (Tuesday, Oct. 23, 2018)	Kelly Clarkson	1	Sarah Grace	"No Roots"	Erika Zade	Team full	Team full	Team full	—
Episode 10 (Tuesday, Oct. 23, 2018)	Blake Shelton	2	Kameron Marlowe	"Only Wanna Be With You"	Kayley Hill	Team full	Team full	Team full	—N/a
Episode 10 (Tuesday, Oct. 23, 2018)	Kelly Clarkson	3	Claire DeJean	"All This Love"	Josh Davis	Team full	Team full	Team full	—
Episode 10 (Tuesday, Oct. 23, 2018)	Blake Shelton	4	Kirk Jay	"Let It Rain"	Caeland Garner	Team full	Team full	Team full	—N/a
Episode 10 (Tuesday, Oct. 23, 2018)	Jennifer Hudson	5	Kennedy Holmes	"Battlefield"	Lela	Team full	Team full	Team full	—
Episode 10 (Tuesday, Oct. 23, 2018)	Adam Levine	6	DeAndre Nico	"Can You Stand the Rain"	Funsho	Team full	Team full	Team full	✔

== The Knockouts ==
The Knockouts round started on October 29. The coaches can each steal one losing artist from another team and save one artist who lost their Knockout on their own team. The top 24 contestants then moved on to the Live Playoffs. Mariah Carey served as the advisor to contestants from all teams in this round. Cody Ray Raymond from Team Kelly dropped out from the competition for personal reasons; Clarkson grouped three of her members into one knockout, with two contestants from the trio advancing, with the third being declared the loser, just like on the eighth season. This episode on October 30 is in memory of a finalist of season 1, Beverly McClellan who died on stage 3c endometrial cancer.

Color key:

Artist won the Knockout and advanced to the Live Playoffs
Artist lost the Knockout but was stolen by another coach and advanced to the Live Playoffs
Artist lost the Knockout but was saved by their coach and advanced to the Live Playoffs
Artist lost the Knockout and was eliminated

Episodes	Coach	Order	Song	Artists		Song	'Steal'/'Save' result			
Episodes	Coach	Order	Song	Winner(s)	Loser	Song	Adam	Kelly	Jennifer	Blake
Episode 11 (Monday, Oct. 29, 2018)	Adam Levine	1	"Ring of Fire"	Tyke James	Keith Paluso	"You Are the Best Thing"	✔	✔	—	—
Episode 11 (Monday, Oct. 29, 2018)	Kelly Clarkson	2	"The Middle"	Kymberli Joye	Natasia GreyCloud	"Tennessee Whiskey"	—	—	—	✔
Episode 11 (Monday, Oct. 29, 2018)	Kelly Clarkson	2	"Cruisin'"	Zaxai	Natasia GreyCloud	"Tennessee Whiskey"	—	—	—	✔
Episode 11 (Monday, Oct. 29, 2018)	Jennifer Hudson	3	"How Deep Is Your Love"	MaKenzie Thomas	Mike Parker	"Breakeven"	—	Steal used	—	Steal used
Episode 11 (Monday, Oct. 29, 2018)	Adam Levine	4	"Dancing On My Own"	Reagan Strange	RADHA	"I'll Be There"	✔	Steal used	—	Steal used
Episode 11 (Monday, Oct. 29, 2018)	Blake Shelton	5	"Earned It"	Funsho	Katrina Cain	"Don't Let Me Down"	—	Steal used	—	—
Episode 11 (Monday, Oct. 29, 2018)	Jennifer Hudson	6	"I Don't Want to Miss a Thing"	Patrique Fortson	SandyRedd	"Dangerous Woman"	—	Steal used	✔	Steal used
Episode 12 (Tuesday, Oct. 30, 2018)	Jennifer Hudson	1	"Call Out My Name"	Franc West	Tyshawn Colquitt	"Pillowtalk"	—	Steal used	Save used	Steal used
Episode 12 (Tuesday, Oct. 30, 2018)	Kelly Clarkson	2	"Because of You"	Abby Cates	Claire DeJean	"There's Nothing Holdin' Me Back"	—	—	—	Steal used
Episode 12 (Tuesday, Oct. 30, 2018)	Blake Shelton	3	"Stuck on You"	Dave Fenley	Kameron Marlowe	"I Shot the Sheriff"	✔	Steal used	—	—
Episode 13 (Monday, Nov. 5, 2018)	Kelly Clarkson	1	"Travelin' Soldier"	Chevel Shepherd	Sarah Grace	"I'd Rather Go Blind"	Team full	✔	—	Steal used
Episode 13 (Monday, Nov. 5, 2018)	Adam Levine	2	"Wanted"	DeAndre Nico	Jake Wells	"Yellow"	Team full	Team full	—	Steal used
Episode 13 (Monday, Nov. 5, 2018)	Jennifer Hudson	3	"What About Us"	Kennedy Holmes	Anthony Arya	"Operator (That's Not the Way It Feels)"	Team full	Team full	Save used	Steal used
Episode 13 (Monday, Nov. 5, 2018)	Blake Shelton	4	"In Case You Didn't Know"	Kirk Jay	Colton Smith	"Lady Marmalade"	Team full	Team full	✔	—
Episode 13 (Monday, Nov. 5, 2018)	Adam Levine	5	"Unaware"	Steve Memmolo	Delaney Silvernell	"Praying"	Team full	Team full	Team full	Steal used
Episode 13 (Monday, Nov. 5, 2018)	Blake Shelton	6	"Whipping Post"	Michael Lee	Chris Kroeze	"Burning House"	Team full	Team full	Team full	✔
Episode 14 (Thursday, Nov. 8, 2018)	The fourteenth episode was a special episode titled "The Road to the Live Shows." The episode showed the best moments of the season so far, including the blind auditions, the journey of the top 24 contestants, and some unseen footage.									

== The Comeback Stage ==
For this season, the show added a brand new phase of competition called The Comeback Stage, exclusive to The Voice mobile app, The Voice YouTube channel, Instagram TV, Facebook, Twitter, and NBC.com. After failing to turn a chair in the blind auditions, artists had the chance to be selected by fifth coach Kelsea Ballerini to become a member of her six-person team. The Comeback Stage consists of three rounds. In the first, it is the Battle round. Artists would be paired up and given a solo song to perform for Kelsea's favor (similar to the Knockouts). In the second, it is the Comeback's Knockout round. The three remaining artists would be given another song to sing, with two of them advancing to the final stage. The third and final stage is run in conjunction with the Live Playoffs. The two remaining artists perform live for America's votes in the first Twitter Instant Save of the season, with the winner officially joining one of the four main teams of their choosing as a part of the Top 13.

=== The Battles ===
Artist won the Battle and advanced to the Knockouts
Artist lost the Battle and was eliminated

Episode (Digital)	Coach	Song	Artists		Song
Episode (Digital)	Coach	Song	Winner	Loser	Song
Episode 7 (Monday, Oct. 15, 2018)	Kelsea Ballerini	"Dangerous Woman"	Ayanna Joni	Madison Cain	"Yoü and I"
Episode 9 (Monday, Oct. 22, 2018)	Kelsea Ballerini	"One Call Away"	Wyatt Rivers	Sam Robbins	"Ain't Too Proud To Beg"
Episode 11 (Monday, Oct. 29, 2018)	Kelsea Ballerini	"My My My!"	Lynnea Moorer	Ele Ivory	"Back to You"

=== The Knockouts ===
Artists won the Knockout and advanced for a chance to enter the Top 13
Artist lost the Knockout and was eliminated

Episode (Digital)	Coach	Song	Artists		Song
Episode (Digital)	Coach	Song	Winners	Loser	Song
Episode 13 (Monday, Nov. 5, 2018)	Kelsea Ballerini	"In My Blood"	Lynnea Moorer	Wyatt Rivers	"How Sweet It Is to Be Loved by You"
Episode 13 (Monday, Nov. 5, 2018)	Kelsea Ballerini	"I Put a Spell on You"	Ayanna Joni	Wyatt Rivers	"How Sweet It Is to Be Loved by You"

=== Live Playoffs ===
Artist received majority of America's votes and got a spot into the Top 13
Artist was eliminated

Episode	Coach	Song	Artists		Song
Episode	Coach	Song	Winner	Loser	Song
Episode 16 (Tuesday, Nov. 13, 2018)	Kelsea Ballerini	"Boo'd Up"	Lynnea Moorer	Ayanna Joni	"No Tears Left to Cry"

== Live shows ==
Color key:

Artist was saved by the Public's votes
Artist was saved by his/her coach or was placed in the bottom two, bottom three, or middle three
Artist won the Comeback Stage and joined another team
Artist was saved by the Instant Save
Artist's Apple Music vote multiplied by 5 (except The Finals) after his/her studio version of the song had the most streams of the night
Artist was eliminated

=== Week 1: Live Playoffs (Nov. 12 & 13) ===
The Live Playoffs comprised episodes 15 and 16. The 24 artists perform, with two artists from each team advancing based on the viewers' vote, and each coach completing their respective teams with their own choice. The Monday night broadcast featured all teams and the Tuesday night broadcast featured the results, along with the final Comeback Stage matchup.

Ballerini was added as the fifth coach and has coached six artists who did not turn a chair in the Blind Auditions to help them get a second chance to return to the competition for the live shows. They had their own battles and knockouts, and only two, Ayanna Joni and Lynnea Moorer, competed via America's vote (similar to the Instant Save) for a place in the Top 13. Moorer was revealed the winner of "The Comeback Stage", and joined Team Kelly on the Top 13.

With the elimination of Kameron Marlowe, this marked the first time since the 7th season that Levine did not include the artist that he stole in the Knockouts in his top three, as Brian Johnson, Amy Vachal, Shalyah Fearing, Josh Gallagher, Lilli Passero, Adam Cunningham, and Sharane Calister were all either chosen by him or voted into his top three by the public in the 8th, 9th, 10th, 11th, 12th, 13th, and 14th seasons, respectively.

Episode	Coach	Order	Artist	Song	Result
Episode 15 (Monday, Nov. 12, 2018)	Blake Shelton	1	Michael Lee	"Everytime I Roll the Dice"	Eliminated
Episode 15 (Monday, Nov. 12, 2018)	Blake Shelton	2	Dave Fenley	"Angel Flying Too Close to the Ground"	Blake's choice
Episode 15 (Monday, Nov. 12, 2018)	Blake Shelton	3	Natasia GreyCloud	"God Is a Woman"	Eliminated
Episode 15 (Monday, Nov. 12, 2018)	Blake Shelton	4	Chris Kroeze	"Have You Ever Seen the Rain?"	Public's vote
Episode 15 (Monday, Nov. 12, 2018)	Blake Shelton	5	Funsho	"How Long"	Eliminated
Episode 15 (Monday, Nov. 12, 2018)	Blake Shelton	6	Kirk Jay	"One More Day"	Public's vote
Episode 15 (Monday, Nov. 12, 2018)	Kelly Clarkson	7	Abby Cates	"Next to Me"	Eliminated
Episode 15 (Monday, Nov. 12, 2018)	Kelly Clarkson	8	Keith Paluso	"Someone Like You"	Eliminated
Episode 15 (Monday, Nov. 12, 2018)	Kelly Clarkson	9	Sarah Grace	"When Something Is Wrong With My Baby"	Public's vote
Episode 15 (Monday, Nov. 12, 2018)	Kelly Clarkson	10	Zaxai	"When I Need You"	Eliminated
Episode 15 (Monday, Nov. 12, 2018)	Kelly Clarkson	11	Chevel Shepherd	"Grandpa (Tell Me 'Bout the Good Ol' Days)"	Public's vote
Episode 15 (Monday, Nov. 12, 2018)	Kelly Clarkson	12	Kymberli Joye	"Radioactive"	Kelly's choice
Episode 15 (Monday, Nov. 12, 2018)	Adam Levine	13	Steve Memmolo	"More Today Than Yesterday"	Eliminated
Episode 15 (Monday, Nov. 12, 2018)	Adam Levine	14	DeAndre Nico	"Ordinary People"	Public's vote
Episode 15 (Monday, Nov. 12, 2018)	Adam Levine	15	RADHA	"Dusk Till Dawn"	Eliminated
Episode 15 (Monday, Nov. 12, 2018)	Adam Levine	16	Kameron Marlowe	"I Ain't Living Long Like This"	Eliminated
Episode 15 (Monday, Nov. 12, 2018)	Adam Levine	17	Tyke James	"Use Somebody"	Adam's choice
Episode 15 (Monday, Nov. 12, 2018)	Adam Levine	18	Reagan Strange	"Worth It"	Public's vote
Episode 15 (Monday, Nov. 12, 2018)	Jennifer Hudson	19	Patrique Fortson	"Ain't Nobody"	Eliminated
Episode 15 (Monday, Nov. 12, 2018)	Jennifer Hudson	20	MaKenzie Thomas	"I Believe in You and Me"	Public's vote
Episode 15 (Monday, Nov. 12, 2018)	Jennifer Hudson	21	Franc West	"Apologize"	Eliminated
Episode 15 (Monday, Nov. 12, 2018)	Jennifer Hudson	22	SandyRedd	"No More Drama"	Jennifer's choice
Episode 15 (Monday, Nov. 12, 2018)	Jennifer Hudson	23	Colton Smith	"Scared to Be Lonely"	Eliminated
Episode 15 (Monday, Nov. 12, 2018)	Jennifer Hudson	24	Kennedy Holmes	"Halo"	Public's vote
Comeback Stage Performances
Episode 16 (Tuesday, Nov. 13, 2018)	Kelsea Ballerini	1	Ayanna Joni	"No Tears Left to Cry"	Eliminated
Episode 16 (Tuesday, Nov. 13, 2018)	Kelsea Ballerini	2	Lynnea Moorer	"Boo'd Up"	Comeback Stage Artist

Non-competition performances
Order	Performer(s)	Song
16.1	Kane Brown	"Lose It"
16.2	Backstreet Boys	"Chances"

=== Week 2: Top 13 (Nov. 19 & 20) ===
This week's theme was “Dedications”. The three artists with the fewest votes competed for an Instant Save, with two leaving the competition.

This season, the live show voting mechanism has changed. iTunes purchases of the singles released by the top 13 artists were instead replaced with Apple Music streams which now count as votes. This also affected the iTunes multiplier bonus from past seasons. This time, the artist (and only one) with the most streams after the closing of the voting window would receive a fivefold multiplier.

The Apple Music multiplier was awarded to Reagan Strange. The singles charted in the top 10 this week was Kirk Jay (#10).

Episode	Coach	Order	Artist	Song	Result
Episode 17 (Monday, Nov. 19, 2018)	Blake Shelton	1	Chris Kroeze	"Let It Be"	Public's vote
Episode 17 (Monday, Nov. 19, 2018)	Adam Levine	2	Tyke James	"(Everything I Do) I Do It For You"	Bottom three
Episode 17 (Monday, Nov. 19, 2018)	Adam Levine	3	DeAndre Nico	"I Can Only Imagine"	Public's vote
Episode 17 (Monday, Nov. 19, 2018)	Kelly Clarkson	4	Kymberli Joye	"Diamonds"	Public's vote
Episode 17 (Monday, Nov. 19, 2018)	Jennifer Hudson	5	Kennedy Holmes	"Wind Beneath My Wings"	Public's vote
Episode 17 (Monday, Nov. 19, 2018)	Jennifer Hudson	6	SandyRedd	"It's So Hard to Say Goodbye to Yesterday"	Bottom three
Episode 17 (Monday, Nov. 19, 2018)	Kelly Clarkson	7	Chevel Shepherd	"Little White Church"	Public's vote
Episode 17 (Monday, Nov. 19, 2018)	Jennifer Hudson	8	MaKenzie Thomas	"I Am Changing"	Public's vote
Episode 17 (Monday, Nov. 19, 2018)	Kelly Clarkson	9	Sarah Grace	"Goodbye Yellow Brick Road"	Public's vote
Episode 17 (Monday, Nov. 19, 2018)	Blake Shelton	10	Dave Fenley	"Hard to Love"	Public's vote
Episode 17 (Monday, Nov. 19, 2018)	Kelly Clarkson	11	Lynnea Moorer	"Wolves"	Bottom three
Episode 17 (Monday, Nov. 19, 2018)	Blake Shelton	12	Kirk Jay	"I'm Already There"	Public's vote
Episode 17 (Monday, Nov. 19, 2018)	Adam Levine	13	Reagan Strange	"You Say"	Public's vote
Instant Save Performances
Episode 18 (Tuesday, Nov. 20, 2018)	Jennifer Hudson	1	SandyRedd	"Believer"	Eliminated
Episode 18 (Tuesday, Nov. 20, 2018)	Adam Levine	2	Tyke James	"Home"	Eliminated
Episode 18 (Tuesday, Nov. 20, 2018)	Kelly Clarkson	3	Lynnea Moorer	"If I Ain't Got You"	Instant Save

Non-competition performances
Order	Performer	Song
18.1	Adam Levine and his team (Tyke James, DeAndre Nico, and Reagan Strange)	"Rhiannon"
18.2	Kelly Clarkson and her team (Sarah Grace, Kymberli Joye, Lynnea Moorer, and Chevel Shepherd)	"I Will Always Love You"

=== Week 3: Top 11 (Nov. 26 & 27) ===
The theme for this week was "Fan Night", meaning that the artists performed songs chosen by the fans. The two artists with the fewest votes will compete for an Instant Save, with one leaving the competition. The Apple Music multiplier was awarded to Strange, while two artists had singles reached Top 10 on iTunes (Kennedy Holmes (#7) and Kymberli Joye (#8).

Episode	Coach	Order	Artist	Song	Result
Episode 19 (Monday, Nov. 26, 2018)	Blake Shelton	1	Dave Fenley	"Use Me"	Public's vote
Episode 19 (Monday, Nov. 26, 2018)	Kelly Clarkson	2	Chevel Shepherd	"Space Cowboy"	Public's vote
Episode 19 (Monday, Nov. 26, 2018)	Adam Levine	3	Reagan Strange	"Complicated"	Public's vote
Episode 19 (Monday, Nov. 26, 2018)	Kelly Clarkson	4	Kymberli Joye	"Break Every Chain"	Public's vote
Episode 19 (Monday, Nov. 26, 2018)	Blake Shelton	5	Kirk Jay	"Body Like a Back Road"	Public's vote
Episode 19 (Monday, Nov. 26, 2018)	Blake Shelton	6	Chris Kroeze	"Long Train Runnin'"	Public's vote
Episode 19 (Monday, Nov. 26, 2018)	Kelly Clarkson	7	Lynnea Moorer	"Consequences"	Bottom two
Episode 19 (Monday, Nov. 26, 2018)	Jennifer Hudson	8	MaKenzie Thomas	"Emotion"	Public's vote
Episode 19 (Monday, Nov. 26, 2018)	Kelly Clarkson	9	Sarah Grace	"Dog Days Are Over"	Public's vote
Episode 19 (Monday, Nov. 26, 2018)	Adam Levine	10	DeAndre Nico	"Cry for You"	Bottom two
Episode 19 (Monday, Nov. 26, 2018)	Jennifer Hudson	11	Kennedy Holmes	"Greatest Love of All"	Public's vote
Instant Save Performances
Episode 20 (Tuesday, Nov. 27, 2018)	Kelly Clarkson	1	Lynnea Moorer	"Tattooed Heart"	Eliminated
Episode 20 (Tuesday, Nov. 27, 2018)	Adam Levine	2	DeAndre Nico	"Take Me to the King"	Instant Save

Non-competition performances
Order	Performers	Song
20.1	Blake Shelton and his team (Dave Fenley, Kirk Jay, and Chris Kroeze)	"Dixieland Delight"
20.2	Kelsea Ballerini	"Miss Me More"
20.3	Jennifer Hudson and her team (Kennedy Holmes and MaKenzie Thomas)	"The Rose"

=== Week 4: Top 10 (Dec. 3 & 4) ===
The Apple Music multiplier bonus was awarded to Chris Kroeze, while Sarah Grace (#3) and Kirk Jay (#4) had singles reached Top 10 on iTunes.

With the advancement of Chevel Shepherd, Kymberli Joye, and Sarah Grace, Clarkson became the first female coach to get more than two artists on her team to the semifinals. With the elimination of Dave Fenley, this marked the first time since the 11th season that Shelton lost any members of his team prior to the semifinals, and the second time out of the past seven seasons in which such an event occurred, having kept his entire team intact up until that point in the competition in the 9th, 10th, 12th, 13th, and 14th seasons.

Episode	Coach	Order	Artist	Song	Result
Episode 21 (Monday, Dec. 3, 2018)	Jennifer Hudson	1	Kennedy Holmes	"Me Too"	Public's vote
Episode 21 (Monday, Dec. 3, 2018)	Adam Levine	2	Reagan Strange	"Cry"	Bottom three
Episode 21 (Monday, Dec. 3, 2018)	Kelly Clarkson	3	Sarah Grace	"Amazing Grace" (Note: Sarah Grace sang the lyrics of "Amazing Grace" to the melody and background music of "The House of the Rising Sun".)	Public's vote
Episode 21 (Monday, Dec. 3, 2018)	Kelly Clarkson	4	Kymberli Joye	"Oceans (Where Feet May Fail)"	Public's vote
Episode 21 (Monday, Dec. 3, 2018)	Blake Shelton	5	Chris Kroeze	"Callin' Baton Rouge"	Public's vote
Episode 21 (Monday, Dec. 3, 2018)	Blake Shelton	6	Dave Fenley	"When You Say Nothing At All"	Bottom three
Episode 21 (Monday, Dec. 3, 2018)	Adam Levine	7	DeAndre Nico	"That's What I Like"	Bottom three
Episode 21 (Monday, Dec. 3, 2018)	Kelly Clarkson	8	Chevel Shepherd	"You're Lookin' At Country"	Public's vote
Episode 21 (Monday, Dec. 3, 2018)	Blake Shelton	9	Kirk Jay	"Tomorrow"	Public's vote
Episode 21 (Monday, Dec. 3, 2018)	Jennifer Hudson	10	MaKenzie Thomas	"Because You Loved Me"	Public's vote
Instant Save Performances
Episode 22 (Tuesday, Dec. 4, 2018)	Adam Levine	N/A (Note: Reagan Strange was "under the weather" and unable to perform her Instant Save song. However, she still participated in the Instant Save.)	Reagan Strange	—	Instant Save
Episode 22 (Tuesday, Dec. 4, 2018)	Blake Shelton	1	Dave Fenley	"Amazed"	Eliminated
Episode 22 (Tuesday, Dec. 4, 2018)	Adam Levine	2	DeAndre Nico	"All of Me"	Eliminated

Non-competition performances
Order	Performers	Song
21.1	Blake Shelton	"Turnin' Me On"
22.1	Anne-Marie & James Arthur	"Rewrite the Stars"
22.2	Kelly Clarkson	"Heat"
22.3	Gwen Stefani feat. Mon Laferte	"Feliz Navidad"

=== Week 5: Semifinals (Dec. 10 & 11) ===
The Top 8 performed on Monday, December 10, 2018, with the results following on Tuesday, December 11, 2018. The top three artists immediately advanced on to the finale, while the bottom two artists with the fewest votes were immediately eliminated and the middle three contended for the remaining spot in the next finale via the Instant Save. Clarkson brought in Brynn Cartelli to help her team in the rehearsals. In addition to their individual songs, each artist performed a duet mashup with another artist in the competition, but unlike the past two seasons, these duets were not available for purchase on iTunes.

The Apple Music multiplier bonus was awarded to Kroeze, while singles for Shepherd (#4) and Jay (#6) charting in at Top 10 on iTunes.

With the elimination of Strange, Levine no longer had any artists left on his team. This was the second season in a row (and the fourth time overall) in which none of his artists represented him in the finale. With the advancements of Shepherd and Holmes, this season also marked the second consecutive season in which two female coaches were represented in the finale, with Shepherd representing Clarkson and Holmes representing Hudson. Holmes's advancement also marked Hudson's first American season to have a finalist, after not being represented in the 13th season. With the advancement of Kroeze, this season marks the first time that an artist who was defeated in Knockout round but was saved by his coach went on to compete in the finale.

Episode	Coach	Order	Artist	Solo Song	Duet Mashup	Results
Episode 23 (Monday, Dec. 10, 2018)	Kelly Clarkson	1 (10)	Sarah Grace	"Sign of the Times"	"Jumpin' Jack Flash"/"Chain of Fools"	Eliminated
Episode 23 (Monday, Dec. 10, 2018)	Jennifer Hudson	3 (7)	MaKenzie Thomas	"Vision of Love"	"Best of My Love"/"Got to Be Real"	Middle Three
Episode 23 (Monday, Dec. 10, 2018)	Kelly Clarkson	5 (7)	Kymberli Joye	"Never Alone"	"Best of My Love"/"Got to Be Real"	Eliminated
Episode 23 (Monday, Dec. 10, 2018)	Blake Shelton	6 (10)	Chris Kroeze	"Can't You See"	"Jumpin' Jack Flash"/"Chain of Fools"	Public's vote
Episode 23 (Monday, Dec. 10, 2018)	Jennifer Hudson	8 (2)	Kennedy Holmes	"This Is Me"	"Happy"/"Tightrope"	Middle Three
Episode 23 (Monday, Dec. 10, 2018)	Adam Levine	9 (2)	Reagan Strange	"You Are the Reason"	"Happy"/"Tightrope"	Middle Three
Episode 23 (Monday, Dec. 10, 2018)	Kelly Clarkson	11 (4)	Chevel Shepherd	"Blue"	"She's Country"/"Country Must Be Country Wide"	Public's vote
Episode 23 (Monday, Dec. 10, 2018)	Blake Shelton	12 (4)	Kirk Jay	"I Swear"	"She's Country"/"Country Must Be Country Wide"	Public's vote
Instant Save Performances
Episode 24 (Tuesday, Dec. 11, 2018)	Jennifer Hudson	1	MaKenzie Thomas	"Up to the Mountain"		Eliminated
Episode 24 (Tuesday, Dec. 11, 2018)	Adam Levine	2	Reagan Strange	"Wherever You Will Go"		Eliminated
Episode 24 (Tuesday, Dec. 11, 2018)	Jennifer Hudson	3	Kennedy Holmes	"How Do I Live"		Instant Save

Non-competition performances
Order	Performer	Song
23.1	Jennifer Hudson	"Round and Round"
24.1	Michael Bublé	"Where or When"
24.2	Hailee Steinfeld	"Back to Life"
24.3	Jennifer Hudson	"I'll Fight"

=== Week 6: Finale (Dec. 17 & 18) ===
The final 4 performed on Monday, December 17, 2018, with the final results following on Tuesday, December 18, 2018. Each finalist performed a solo cover song, a holiday-themed duet with their coach, and an original song. The contestant's performances reached the top 10 on iTunes were Shepherd (#1 & #9), Kroeze (#3) and Jay (#2, #4 & #5).

Coach	Artist	Order	Solo Song	Order	Duet Song (with Coach)	Order	Original Song	Result
Blake Shelton	Chris Kroeze	1	"Sweet Home Alabama"	9	"Two More Bottles of Wine"	7	"Human"	Runner-up
Kelly Clarkson	Chevel Shepherd	2	"It's a Little Too Late"	8	"Rockin' with the Rhythm of the Rain"	11	"Broken Hearts"	Winner
Blake Shelton	Kirk Jay	10	"I Won't Let Go"	5	"You Look So Good in Love"	3	"Defenseless"	Third Place
Jennifer Hudson	Kennedy Holmes	12	"Confident"	6	"Home"	4	"Love Is Free"	Fourth Place

Non-competition performances
Order	Performers	Song
26.1	Kelly Rowland & Kennedy Holmes	"When Love Takes Over"
26.2	Marshmello & Bastille	"Happier"
26.3	Rascal Flatts & Kirk Jay	"Back To Life"
26.4	Patrique Fortson, Kymberli Joye, DeAndre Nico & MaKenzie Thomas	"Declaration (This Is It)"
26.5	Doobie Brothers & Chris Kroeze	"Long Train Runnin'"
26.6	Brynn Cartelli	"Last Night's Mascara"
26.7	Panic! at the Disco	"Hey Look Ma, I Made It" & "High Hopes"
26.8	Abby Cates, Sarah Grace & Reagan Strange	"Million Reasons"
26.9	John Legend & Esperanza Spalding	"Have Yourself a Merry Little Christmas"
26.10	Jennifer Hudson & Kelly Clarkson	"O Holy Night"
26.11	Dan + Shay & Chevel Shepherd	"Speechless"
26.12	Dierks Bentley	"Burning Man"
26.13	Halsey	"Without Me"

== Elimination chart ==
=== Overall ===
Color key
Artist's info

- Team Adam
- Team Kelly
- Team JHud
- Team Blake
- Comeback Stage Artists

Result details

- Winner
- Runner-up
- Third place
- Fourth place
- Saved by Instant Save (via Twitter)
- Saved by the public
- Saved by his/her coach
- Artist won the Comeback Stage and joined another team
- Eliminated

Live Show Results per week
Artists	Week 1 Playoffs	Week 2	Week 3	Week 4	Week 5	Week 6 Finale
Chevel Shepherd	Safe	Safe	Safe	Safe	Safe	Winner
Chris Kroeze	Safe	Safe	Safe	Safe	Safe	Runner-up
Kirk Jay	Safe	Safe	Safe	Safe	Safe	3rd place
Kennedy Holmes	Safe	Safe	Safe	Safe	Safe	4th place
MaKenzie Thomas	Safe	Safe	Safe	Safe	Eliminated	Eliminated (Week 5)
Reagan Strange	Safe	Safe	Safe	Safe	Eliminated	Eliminated (Week 5)
Sarah Grace	Safe	Safe	Safe	Safe	Eliminated	Eliminated (Week 5)
Kymberli Joye	Safe	Safe	Safe	Safe	Eliminated	Eliminated (Week 5)
Dave Fenley	Safe	Safe	Safe	Eliminated	Eliminated (Week 4)	
DeAndre Nico	Safe	Safe	Safe	Eliminated	Eliminated (Week 4)	
Lynnea Moorer	Safe	Safe	Eliminated	Eliminated (Week 3)		
Tyke James	Safe	Eliminated	Eliminated (Week 2)			
SandyRedd	Safe	Eliminated	Eliminated (Week 2)			
Abby Cates	Eliminated	Eliminated (Week 1)				
Patrique Fortson	Eliminated	Eliminated (Week 1)				
Funsho	Eliminated	Eliminated (Week 1)				
Natasia GreyCloud	Eliminated	Eliminated (Week 1)				
Ayanna Joni	Eliminated	Eliminated (Week 1)				
Michael Lee	Eliminated	Eliminated (Week 1)				
Kameron Marlowe	Eliminated	Eliminated (Week 1)				
Steve Memmolo	Eliminated	Eliminated (Week 1)				
Keith Paluso	Eliminated	Eliminated (Week 1)				
RADHA	Eliminated	Eliminated (Week 1)				
Colton Smith	Eliminated	Eliminated (Week 1)				
Franc West	Eliminated	Eliminated (Week 1)				
Zaxai	Eliminated	Eliminated (Week 1)				

=== Teams ===
Color key
Artist's info

- Team Adam
- Team Kelly
- Team JHud
- Team Blake

Results details

- Winner
- Runner-up
- Third place
- Fourth place
- Eliminated
- Saved by Instant Save (via Twitter)
- Artist won the Comeback Stage (via Twitter)
- Artist had the most streams of the night and received Apple Music bonus that week
- Number of performances reached Top 10 on iTunes
- Teams are in 3 artists
- No artists remaining on his/her team

Artist	Week 1 Playoffs	Week 2	Week 3	Week 4	Week 5	Week 6 Finale
Reagan Strange	Public's vote	Advanced	Advanced	Advanced	Eliminated	
DeAndre Nico	Public's vote	Advanced	Advanced	Eliminated		
Tyke James	Coach's choice	Eliminated				
Kameron Marlowe	Eliminated					
Steve Memmolo	Eliminated					
RADHA	Eliminated					
Chevel Shepherd	Public's vote	Advanced	Advanced	Advanced	Advanced	Winner
Sarah Grace	Public's vote	Advanced	Advanced	Advanced	Eliminated	
Kymberli Joye	Coach's choice	Advanced	Advanced	Advanced	Eliminated	
Lynnea Moorer	Public's vote	Advanced	Eliminated			
Abby Cates	Eliminated					
Keith Paluso	Eliminated					
Zaxai	Eliminated					
Kennedy Holmes	Public's vote	Advanced	Advanced	Advanced	Advanced	Fourth place
MaKenzie Thomas	Public's vote	Advanced	Advanced	Advanced	Eliminated	
SandyRedd	Coach's choice	Eliminated				
Patrique Fortson	Eliminated					
Colton Smith	Eliminated					
Franc West	Eliminated					
Chris Kroeze	Public's vote	Advanced	Advanced	Advanced	Advanced	Runner-up
Kirk Jay	Public's vote	Advanced	Advanced	Advanced	Advanced	Third place
Dave Fenley	Coach's choice	Advanced	Advanced	Eliminated		
Funsho	Eliminated					
Natasia GreyCloud	Eliminated					
Michael Lee	Eliminated					

Rank	Coach	Top 13	Top 11	Top 10	Top 8	Top 6	Top 4
1	Kelly Clarkson	4	4	3	3	1	1
2	Blake Shelton	3	3	3	2	2	2
3	Jennifer Hudson	3	2	2	2	2	1
4	Adam Levine	3	2	2	1	1	0

== Ratings ==
Episode		Original airdate	Production	Time slot (ET)	Viewers (in millions)	Adults (18–49)		Source
Episode		Original airdate	Production	Time slot (ET)	Viewers (in millions)	Rating	Share	Source
1	"The Blind Auditions Premiere, Part 1"	September 24, 2018	1501	Monday 8:00 p.m.	9.66	2.0	8	
2	"The Blind Auditions Premiere, Part 2"	September 25, 2018	1502	Tuesday 8:00 p.m.	9.90	2.2	10	
3	"The Blind Auditions, Part 3"	October 1, 2018	1503	Monday 8:00 p.m.	10.06	2.1	8	
4	"The Blind Auditions, Part 4"	October 2, 2018	1504	Tuesday 8:00 p.m.	9.19	1.8	8	
5	"The Blind Auditions, Part 5"	October 8, 2018	1505	Monday 8:00 p.m.	9.56	1.9	8	
6	"The Blind Auditions, Part 6"	October 9, 2018	1506	Tuesday 8:00 p.m.	9.21	1.8	8	
7	"The Blinds End and the Battles Begin"	October 15, 2018	1507	Monday 8:00 p.m.	9.99	1.9	8	
8	"The Battles Premiere, Part 2"	October 16, 2018	1508	Tuesday 8:00 p.m.	8.99	1.8	8	
9	"The Battles, Part 3"	October 22, 2018	1509	Monday 8:00 p.m.	9.38	1.9	8	
10	"The Battles, Part 4"	October 23, 2018	1510	Tuesday 8:00 p.m.	8.44	1.6	7	
11	"The Knockouts Premiere, Part 1"	October 29, 2018	1511	Monday 8:00 p.m.	9.46	1.8	8	
12	"The Knockouts Premiere, Part 2"	October 30, 2018	1512	Tuesday 8:00 p.m.	9.00	1.6	7	
13	"The Knockouts, Part 3"	November 5, 2018	1513	Monday 8:00 p.m.	9.03	1.8	8	
14	"The Road To The Lives"	November 8, 2018	1514	Thursday 9:00 p.m.	3.84	0.7	3	
15	"The Live Playoffs, Night 1"	November 12, 2018	1515	Monday 8:00 p.m.	9.00	1.7	8	
16	"The Live Playoffs, Night 2"	November 13, 2018	1516	Tuesday 8:00 p.m.	8.85	1.6	7	
17	"Live Top 13 Performance"	November 19, 2018	1517	Monday 8:00 p.m.	7.88	1.4	6	
18	"Live Top 13 Results"	November 20, 2018	1518	Tuesday 8:00 p.m.	8.22	1.4	6	
19	"Live Top 11 Performance"	November 26, 2018	1519	Monday 8:00 p.m.	9.38	1.6	6	
20	"Live Top 11 Results"	November 27, 2018	1520	Tuesday 8:00 p.m.	9.57	1.5	6	
21	"Live Top 10 Performance"	December 3, 2018	1521	Monday 8:00 p.m.	8.97	1.5	6	
22	"Live Top 10 Results"	December 4, 2018	1522	Tuesday 8:00 p.m.	8.91	1.4	7	
23	"Live Top 8 Semifinals Performance"	December 10, 2018	1523	Monday 8:00 p.m.	8.43	1.4	6	
24	"Live Top 8 Semifinals Results"	December 11, 2018	1524	Tuesday 8:00 p.m.	8.96	1.4	6	
25	"Live Finale Performance"	December 17, 2018	1525	Monday 8:00 p.m.	9.46	1.5	6	
26	"Live Finale Results"	December 18, 2018	1526	Tuesday 9:00 p.m.	9.89	1.7	8	
