= Dallas (Connie Smith song) =

Single by Connie Smith

from the album That's the Way Love Goes
- B-side: "That's the Way Love Goes"
- Released: February 1974
- Recorded: October 1973
- Studio: Columbia Recording Studio
- Genre: Country; Countrypolitan
- Length: 1:55
- Label: Columbia
- Songwriter(s): Leona Williams
- Producer(s): Ray Baker

Connie Smith singles chronology
"Ain't Love a Good Thing" (1973)	"Dallas" (1974)	"I Never Knew (What That Song Meant Before)" (1974)

"Dallas" is a song written by Leona Williams that was originally recorded by American country music singer Connie Smith. The song was released as a single on Columbia Records in 1974 and became a top 40 single on the American country music chart. The same year it was issued on her second studio album with Columbia titled That's the Way Love Goes.

== Background, release and chart performance ==
In 1973, Connie Smith switched to Columbia Records after recording with RCA Victor for nearly ten years and having a series of major country music hits. Under hew Columbia contract, it was negotiated that Smith would be able to record one gospel album per year in addition to recording secular material. "Dallas", written by Leona Williams, was among the secular recordings Smith cut for the label. The track was recorded in October 1973 at the Columbia Recording Studio, located in Nashville, Tennessee. The session was produced by Ray Baker.

"Dallas" was issued as a single on Columbia Records in February 1974. It was backed on the flip side by Smith's cover of Johnny Rodriguez's "That's the Way Love Goes". The song spent 11 weeks on the Billboard Hot Country Songs chart and peaked at number 35 in May 1974. It was Smith's third solo single to reach a peak position in country top 40. It was later issued on Smith's second Columbia studio album titled That's the Way Love Goes.

== Track listing ==
7" vinyl single

- "Dallas" – 1:55
- "That's the Way Love Goes" – 2:45

== Charts ==
Chart (1974)	Peak position
US Hot Country Songs (Billboard)	35
