= Right or Wrong (George Strait album) =

Studio album by George Strait
- Released: October 6, 1983
- Recorded: July 1983
- Studio: Woodland (Nashville, Tennessee)
- Genre: Texas country; honky-tonk; Western swing
- Length: 26:38
- Label: MCA
- Producer: Ray Baker

George Strait chronology
Strait from the Heart (1982)	Right or Wrong (1983)	Does Fort Worth Ever Cross Your Mind (1984)

Singles from Right or Wrong
- 1. "You Look So Good in Love" Released: September 22, 1983; 2. "Right or Wrong" Released: January 25, 1984; 3. "Let's Fall to Pieces Together" Released: May 17, 1984

Professional ratings
Review scores
Source	Rating
AllMusic	4/5 stars

Right or Wrong is the third studio album by American country music artist George Strait, released on October 6, 1983, by MCA Records.

Right or Wrong topped Billboard's (North America) Top Country albums chart, and peaked at #163 on the Billboard 200 albums chart. The singles "You Look So Good in Love" (which was Strait's first song to have a music video), "Right or Wrong" and "Let's Fall to Pieces Together" all topped the Hot Country Singles chart. There were three cover songs on the album: 1) "Right or Wrong", a traditional song dating back to the 1920s which was previously most associated with the Emmett Miller and Bob Wills versions; 2) the Hank Williams song "I'm Satisfied with You"; and 3) the Merle Haggard song, "Our Paths May Never Cross". The album was recorded and mixed digitally.

== Track listing ==
No.	Title	Writer(s)	Length
1.	"You Look So Good in Love"	Glen Ballard; Rory Bourke; Kerry Chater	3:13
2.	"Right or Wrong"	Paul Biese; Haven Gillespie; Arthur L. Sizemore	2:05
3.	"A Little Heaven's Rubbing off on Me"	Gene Dobbins; John Scott Sherrill	2:41
4.	"80 Proof Bottle of Tear Stopper"	Darryl Staedtler	2:12
5.	"Every Time It Rains (Lord Don't It Pour)"	Charlie Craig; Keith Stegall	3:00
6.	"You're the Cloud I'm On (When I'm High)"	Ronnie Rogers	2:42
7.	"Let's Fall to Pieces Together"	Dickey Lee; Tommy Rocco; Johnny Russell	2:55
8.	"I'm Satisfied with You"	Fred Rose	2:50
9.	"Our Paths May Never Cross"	Merle Haggard	2:34
10.	"Fifteen Years Going Up (And One Night Coming Down)"	Peggy Forman	2:50
Total length:			26:38

== Personnel ==
Musicians

- George Strait – lead vocals, acoustic guitar
- Hargus "Pig" Robbins – keyboards
- Bobby Wood – keyboards
- Gregg Galbraith – lead guitars, acoustic guitar
- Reggie Young – lead guitars
- Jimmy Capps – acoustic guitar
- George "Leo" Jackson – acoustic guitar
- Weldon Myrick – steel guitar
- Johnny Gimble – fiddle, mandolin
- Bob Moore – bass
- Leon Rhodes – bass
- Henry Strzelecki – bass
- Jerry Carrigan – drums
- Gene Chrisman – drums
- Doug Clements – backing vocals
- Louis Nunley – backing vocals
- Judy Rodman – backing vocals
- Donna Sheridan – backing vocals
- Hurshel Wiginton – backing vocals

Production

- Ray Baker – producer
- Les Ladd – engineer
- Rick McCollister – engineer
- Ron Reynolds – engineer
- Milan Bogdan – digital editing
- Simon Levy – CD art direction
- Camille Engel Advertising – CD design
- Katie Gillon – CD coordination
- Sherri Halford – CD coordination
- Rick Henson – cover photo

== Charts ==
=== Weekly charts ===
Chart (1983)	Peak position
US Billboard 200	163
US Top Country Albums (Billboard)	1

=== Year-end charts ===
Chart (1984)	Position
US Top Country Albums (Billboard)	2
Chart (1985)	Position
US Top Country Albums (Billboard)	47

== Certifications ==
Region	Certification	Certified units/sales
United States (RIAA)	Platinum	1,000,000^{^}
^{^} Shipments figures based on certification alone.
