= Right or Wrong (1921 song) =

1921 jazz ballad

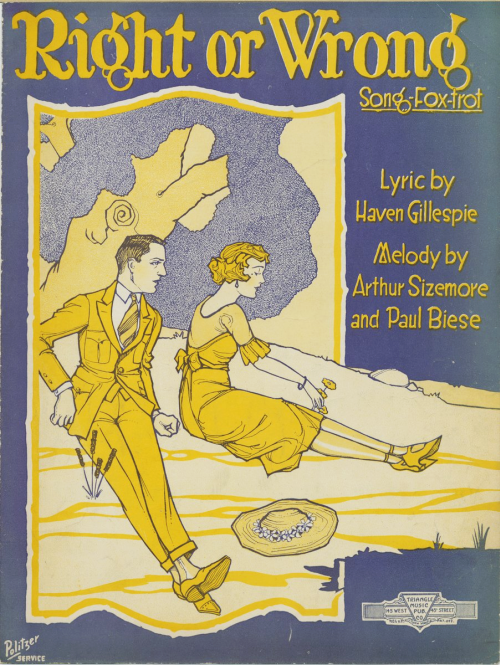
- Sheet music cover

Song
- Written: 1921
- Genre: Jazz
- Songwriters: Composer:Arthur Sizemore, Paul Biese; Lyricist: Haven Gillespie

"Right or Wrong" is a jazz ballad from 1921. Composed by Arthur Sizemore and Paul Biese, with words by Haven Gillespie, it is described by the original sheet music as "a beautiful fox-trot ballad."

The lyrics tell of the loss of a paramour. The title comes from a refrain in the chorus:

Right or wrong, I'll always love you
Though you're gone, I can't forget
Right or wrong, I'll keep on dreaming
Still I wake with that same old regret

All along I knew I'd lose you
Though I prayed that you'd be true
In your heart, please just remember
Right or wrong, I'm still in love with you

== Recordings ==
"Right or Wrong" was recorded by many early jazz and swing orchestras, including Mike Markel and His Orchestra (OKeh 4478, 1921), Original Dixie Jazz Band (Oriole 445, 1925), Peggy English (Brunswick 3949, 1928), Tampa Red (Bluebird 6832, 1936). The recording with the longest lasting influence was performed by the black-faced Emmett Miller and the Georgia Crackers (OKeh 41280, 1929).

Miller's version was picked up by an early Bob Wills and became a standard Western swing dance tune. Both Wills (Vocalion 03451, 1936) and Milton Brown (Decca 5342, 1936) made early recordings. Western swing versions generally do not include any of the verses, only repetitions of the chorus. Merle Haggard covered Wills' version in 1970, released on A Tribute to the Best Damn Fiddle Player in the World (or, My Salute to Bob Wills). The song also appears on Leon Redbone's 1990 album Sugar.

The 1937 popular song by Mildred Bailey and Her Orchestra (Vocalion 3758) is a different song, having been written by Victor Schertzinger for the film Something to Sing About.

Wanda Jackson's hit "Right or Wrong" in 1961 is not this song, but one written by herself.

== George Strait version ==
"Right or Wrong"

Single by George Strait

from the album Right or Wrong
- B-side: "Fifteen Years Going Up (And One Night Coming Down)"
- Released: January 25, 1984
- Recorded: July 20, 1983
- Studio: Woodland (Nashville, Tennessee)
- Genre: Western swing; neotraditional country
- Length: 2:05
- Label: MCA
- Songwriters: Composer:Arthur Sizemore, Paul Biese; Lyricist: Haven Gillespie
- Producer: Ray Baker

George Strait singles chronology
"You Look So Good in Love" (1983)	"Right or Wrong" (1984)	"Let's Fall to Pieces Together" (1984)

The biggest hit for "Right or Wrong" came on April 28, 1984, when George Strait recorded the old Bob Wills song for his best-selling album of the same name (See Right or Wrong). The single from that album (MCA 52337) reached #1, staying on the charts for 12 weeks.

George Strait's success led to the songwriter, Haven Gillespie, receiving a posthumous ASCAP award in 1985 for writing the song.

=== Charts ===
==== Weekly charts ====
Chart (1984)	Peak position
US Hot Country Songs (Billboard)	1
Canadian RPM Country Tracks	1

==== Year-end charts ====
Chart (1984)	Position
US Hot Country Songs (Billboard)	30

== Bibliography ==
- Gillespie, Haven (w.); Arthur Sizemore and Paul Biese (m.) "Right or Wrong". Triangle Music, 1921. From Indiana University Sheet Music Collections.
- King, Charles D. "Gillespie, James Haven Lamont" from The Kentucky Encyclopedia, pp. 374–375, edited by John E. Kleber, Thomas D. Clark, Lowell H. Harrison and James C. Klotter.
- Stambler, Irwin; Grelun Landon. Country Music: The Encyclopedia. St. Martin's Griffin, 2000. ISBN 0-312-26487-9
- Whitburn, Joel. The Billboard Book of Top 40 Country Hits. Billboard Books, 2006. ISBN 0-8230-8291-1
