= I Got a Lot of Hurtin' Done Today / I've Got My Baby on My Mind =

Studio album by Connie Smith
- Released: January 1975
- Recorded: September 19, 1973 – September 27, 1974
- Studio: Columbia Studio B
- Genre: Country
- Label: Columbia
- Producer: Ray Baker

Connie Smith chronology
I Never Knew (What That Song Meant Before) (1974)	I Got a Lot of Hurtin' Done Today / I've Got My Baby on My Mind (1975)	Connie Smith Sings Hank Williams Gospel (1975)

Singles from I Got a Lot of Hurtin' Done Today / I've Got My Baby on My Mind
- 1. "I've Got My Baby on My Mind" Released: November 1974; 2. "I Got a Lot of Hurtin' Done Today" Released: February 1975; 3. "Why Don't You Love Me" Released: May 1975

I Got a Lot of Hurtin' Done Today / I've Got My Baby on My Mind is the twenty-fourth solo studio album by American country singer Connie Smith. It was released in January 1975 and contained 11 tracks. It was also considered to be one of her "most commercially-successful" discs of the decade, according to biographer Barry Mazor. Three singles were included on the project. Both "I've Got My Baby on My Mind" and her cover of "Why Don't You Love Me" reached the top 15 of the American country songs chart. "I Got a Lot of Hurtin' Done Today" would chart in the top 30. The album itself reached the American country LP's chart in early 1975. Billboard gave the album a positive review following its release.

== Background ==
Connie Smith reached her peak commercial success recording for the RCA Victor label. Through 1972, she had 18 singles reach the top ten of the Billboard Hot Country Songs chart. She then moved to Columbia Records where she began recording more gospel music, along with country music. She continued having commercially-successful singles, yet most placed in the country top 20. Smith also took more creative control of the recording process. At Columbia, she collaborated with producer Ray Baker to find songs that matched her interests as a music artist. The pair began finding material for her next Columbia release, which would later be titled I Got a Lot of Hurtin' Done Today/I've Got My Baby on My Mind. For the project, Smith selected material by some of her favorite songwriters and new writers who began pitching her material.

== Recording and content ==
Smith began recording most of the material for I Got a Lot of Hurtin' Done Today / I've Got My Baby on My Mind in the fall of 1974. The sessions for the project took place on September 16, September 17 and September 27, 1974. One track was taken from a studio session on September 19, 1973 while another track was pulled from a January 29, 1974 session. Ray Baker produced the recordings at Columbia Studio B, located in Nashville, Tennessee. Smith had recorded at the studio since signing with the label in 1973. Biographer Barry Mazor described the project as being "one of her most commercially-successful" and "unmistakably hard country sets of this era".

The album consisted of 11 tracks. Pulled from the September 1973 and the January 1974 sessions were the songs "Sunshine Blue" and "I Still Feel the Same About You". The latter recording was a cover of the single by Bill Anderson. His version originally placed in the top 20 of the Billboard country chart. Smith and Baker also chose several other cover tunes for the project. Among them was a cover of Kitty Wells's "Searching (For Someone Like You)". Wells's original reached the top five of the Billboard country chart in 1958. Smith was also preparing a gospel album of Hank Williams material and began searching through his catalog. She found Williams's secular single "Why Don't You Love Me" and decided to include the song on this secular project. Williams's version had originally been a number one Billboard country single in 1950 and received renewed public interest after being included in the film, The Last Picture Show. "Back in the Country" was also a cover of a song recorded by Roy Acuff during the 1970s.

Several new tracks were also part of the album. The two title tracks were both new selections penned by Sanger D. Shafer, whom Smith had recently been recordings songs by. Both "Back in the Country" and "You'll See Jesus" were penned by singer-songwriter, Eddy Raven. It was Smith's first album to feature songs composed by Raven. "Eddy started pitching me songs, and I'm a big Eddy Raven fan," Smith told biographer Barry Mazor. "Ain't It Good to Be in Love Again" was written by Dewayne Orender, who would later write songs for Ronnie Milsap. Smith had first discovered Orender's compositions in the 1960s, but did not find his writing to be of her liking until the 1970s. She would later record another Orender-penned track while at Monument Records. Two tracks on the album were penned by singer-songwriter, Don Gibson: "Praying Hands" and "Loving You Has Changed My Whole Life". Both "Praying Hands" and Eddy Raven's "You'll See Jesus" were the only two gospel tracks on the album. Smith was given freedom to incorporate two gospel songs per secular album as part of her Columbia recording contract.

== Release, reception and singles ==
I've Got a Lot of Hurtin' Done Today / I've Got My Baby on My Mind was released by Columbia Records in January 1975. It was the twenty sixth studio album of Smith's career and her fifth with the Columbia label. The disc was originally distributed as a vinyl LP, containing five songs on "side A" and six songs on "side B". The album was given a positive response from Billboard magazine, who reviewed it in February 1975. "It's just a fine country album, with a strong Acuff-Rose influence," they wrote. The magazine further added, "Enough of everything here to satisfy all sorts of buyers." In 1975, the disc peaked at number 30 on the American Billboard Country LP's chart. It was Smith's fourth top 40 LP entry since signing with Columbia Records in 1973.

Three singles were included on the album. The first single was "I've Got My Baby on My Mind", first issued by Columbia in November 1974. The single reached the top 20 of the Billboard Hot Country Songs chart, climbing to number 13 in January 1975. "I've Got a Lot of Hurtin' Done Today" was then issued as a single in February 1975, peaking at number 30 on the Hot Country Songs chart by April 1975. "Why You Don't You Love Me" was issued as the final single off the project in May 1975. It also became a top 20 single, peaking at number 15 on the Hot Country Songs chart in July 1975. Additionally, all three singles charted on Canada's RPM Country chart. "Why Don't You Love Me" was the highest-climbing single in Canada, reaching number 20 on the RPM chart in 1975.

== Track listing ==
Side one
No.	Title	Writer(s)	Length
1.	"I Got a Lot of Hurtin' Done Today"	Sanger D. Shafer	2:39
2.	"Why Don't You Love Me"	Hank Williams	2:04
3.	"I've Got My Baby on My Mind"	Shafer	2:25
4.	"Praying Hands"	Don Gibson	2:23
5.	"Searching (For Someone Like You)"	Pee Wee Maddux	2:30

Side two
No.	Title	Writer(s)	Length
1.	"Loving You (Has Changed My Whole Life)"	Gibson	2:04
2.	"Ain't It Good to Be in Love Again"	Dewayne Orender	3:15
3.	"Sunshine Blue"	Bill Graham	2:20
4.	"Back in the Country"	Eddy Raven	2:15
5.	"You'll See Jesus"	Raven	2:54
6.	"I Still Feel the Same About You"	Bill Anderson	2:27

== Personnel ==
All credits are adapted from the liner notes of I Got a Lot of Hurtin' Done Today / I've Got My Baby on My Mind and the biography booklet by Barry Mazor titled The Latest Shade of Blue.

Musical personnel

- Byron Bach – Strings
- Brenton Banks – Strings
- George Binkley III – Strings
- Jerry Carrigan – Drums
- Marvin Chantry – Strings
- Dorothy Deleonibus – Background vocals
- Ray Edenton – Rhythm guitar
- Johnny Gimble – Fiddle
- Carol Gorodetzky – Strings
- Lloyd Green – Steel guitar
- Buddy Harman – Drums
- The Jordanaires – Background vocals
- David Kirby – Guitar, leader
- Mildred Kirkham – Background vocals
- Grady Martin – Guitar, leader
- Kenny Malone – Drums
- Martha McCrory – Strings
- Charlie McCoy – Harmonica
- Bob Moore – Electric bass
- Laverna Moore – Background vocals
- The Nashville Edition – Background vocals
- Leon Rhodes – Electric guitar, guitar
- Hargus "Pig" Robbins – Piano
- Hal Rugg – Steel guitar
- Billy Sanford – Electric guitar
- Connie Smith – Lead vocals
- Carol Leigh Snow – Organ
- Buddy Spicher – Strings
- Henry Strzelecki – Electric bass
- Donald Teal, Jr. – Strings
- Bobby Thompson – Guitar
- Gary Van Osdale – Strings
- Stephanie Woolf – Strings
- Chip Young – Guitar

Technical personnel

- Ray Baker – Percussion, producer
- Bill Barnes – Cover design
- Charlie Bradley – Engineer
- Lou Bradley – Engineer
- Al Clayton – Back cover photo
- Jim Hall – Arranger, leader
- Shelly Kurland – Contractor
- Slick Lawson – Cover photo
- Ron Oates – Percussion/leader
- Rob Reynolds – Engineer
- Whitey Shafer – Liner notes
- Bergen White – Arranger

== Charts ==
Chart (1975)	Peak position
US Top Country Albums (Billboard)	30

== Release history ==
Region	Date	Format	Label	Ref.
North America	January 1975	Vinyl	Columbia Records	
Netherlands	1976	Vinyl	CBS Records International	
