= I Got a Lot of Hurtin' Done Today =

Single by Connie Smith

from the album I Got a Lot of Hurtin' Done Today/I've Got My Baby On My Mind
- B-side: "Back in the Country"
- Released: February 1975
- Recorded: September 1974
- Studio: Columbia Recording Studio
- Genre: Country; Countrypolitan
- Length: 2:39
- Label: Columbia
- Songwriter(s): Sanger D. Shafer
- Producer(s): Ray Baker

Connie Smith singles chronology
"I've Got My Baby on My Mind" (1974)	"I Got a Lot of Hurtin' Done Today" (1975)	"Why Don't You Love Me" (1975)

"I Got a Lot of Hurtin' Done Today" is a song written by Sanger D. Shafer that was originally recorded by American country music singer Connie Smith. It was released as a single via Columbia Records and became a top 30 hit single on the American country chart in 1975. It was also released on Smith's 1975 album I Got a Lot of Hurtin' Done Today/I've Got My Baby On My Mind.

== Background, content and chart performance ==
After nearly a decade recording for RCA Victor, Connie Smith left and switched to Columbia Records in 1973. Under the production of Ray Baker, she recorded several singles in the mid 1970s, including "I Got a Lot of Hurtin' Done Today". The song was composed by Sanger D. Shafer. The song was recorded in 1974 at the Columbia Studio, located in Nashville, Tennessee. With Baker serving as producer, Smith cut an additional nine tracks, which would later appear on her 1975 album.

"I Got a Lot of Hurtin' Done Today" was issued as a single on Columbia Records in February 1975. It was backed on the flip side by "Back to the Country," written by Eddy Raven. The song spent ten weeks on the Billboard Hot Country Songs chart and peaked at number 30 in April 1975. It was Smith's fourth solo single to reach a peak position in country top 40. The song also peaked at number 45 on the RPM Country Singles chart in Canada. It was later issued on Smith's 1975 studio album on Columbia titled I Got a Lot of Hurtin' Done Today/I've Got My Baby on My Mind.

== Track listing ==
7" vinyl single

- "I Got a Lot of Hurtin' Done Today" – 2:39
- "Back to the Country" – 2:15

== Charts ==
Chart (1975)	Peak position
Canada Country Songs (RPM)	45
US Hot Country Songs (Billboard)	30
