= I Never Knew (What That Song Meant Before) (song) =

Single by Connie Smith

from the album I Never Knew (What That Song Meant Before)
- B-side: "Did We Have to Come This Far (To Say Goodbye)"
- Released: June 1974
- Genre: Country
- Label: Columbia
- Songwriter(s): Sanger D. Shafer
- Producer(s): Ray Baker

Connie Smith singles chronology
"Dallas" (1974)	"I Never Knew (What That Song Meant Before)" (1974)	"I've Got My Baby on My Mind" (1974)

"I Never Knew (What That Song Meant Before)" is a single by American country music artist Connie Smith. Released in June 1974, the song reached #13 on the Billboard Hot Country Singles chart. The song was issued onto Smith's second 1974 studio release that went by the same name. The single became Smith's second major hit single under Columbia Records.

== Chart performance ==
Chart (1974)	Peak position
U.S. Billboard Hot Country Singles	13
