= I Never Knew (What That Song Meant Before) =

Studio album by Connie Smith
- Released: August 1974
- Recorded: January 29 – April 17, 1974
- Studio: Columbia Studio B
- Genre: Country; traditional country
- Label: Columbia
- Producer: Ray Baker

Connie Smith chronology
Connie Smith Now (1974)	I Never Knew (What That Song Meant Before) (1974)	I Got a Lot of Hurtin' Done Today/I've Got My Baby On My Mind (1975)

Singles from I Never Knew (What That Song Meant Before)
- 1. "I Never Knew (What That Song Meant Before)" Released: June 1974

I Never Knew (What That Song Meant Before) is the twenty-third solo studio album by American country singer Connie Smith. It was released in August 1974 on Columbia Records and contained 11 tracks. The album was a mix of original material and covers of songs by other artists. The project was described as a set of traditional songs. Its title track was a single that reached the top 20 of the American country songs chart. The album itself charted the American country LP's chart following its release. The project was met with a favorable review from Billboard magazine.

== Background ==
After ten years and 18 top ten Billboard country singles at RCA Victor, Connie Smith signed a new recording contract with Columbia Records in 1973. At the label she was given more creative control, including the ability to record one gospel album per year. Smith had recorded three albums with Columbia by 1974 and had a top ten Billboard single with "Ain't Love a Good Thing". She had also recently begun working with producer Ray Baker, whom she trusted more than her first Columbia producer, George Richey. In early 1974, Baker and Smith began finding songs for Smith's fourth Columbia album which would later be titled I Never Knew (What That Song Meant Before). In a 2021 interview, Smith recalled that she was more willing to assert herself with the making of her fourth Columbia project: "As I got a little more comfortable, I went in and spoke my mind more. And Ray [Baker] was great to work with."

== Recording and content ==
Smith began the recording process for I Never Knew (What That Song Meant Before) in early winter of 1974. The album was cut over the course of three studio sessions: January 29, April 16 and April 17, 1974. Three overdub sessions were also recorded that featured string instrumentation. The three-month break between sessions allowed for Smith and Ray Baker to find material to include on the project. All sessions were produced by Ray Baker at Columbia Studio B, located in Nashville, Tennessee. Biographer Barry Mazor found the album to move away from the "suburban" pop style of her previous Columbia releases and more towards "traditional country".

The project contained a total of 11 tracks. Many of the album's tracks were new recordings, such as the title track, which was written by Sanger D. Shafer. Two songs composed by Dallas Frazier and Arthur Leo Owens are also part of the track listing. Among these, "Did We Have to Come This Far (To Say Goodbye)" was considered by Smith to be among her "all-time favorites". As part of her religious beliefs, Smith incorporated one gospel selection on the album: "I Wish We'd All Been Ready", written by Larry Norman.

Smith had previously cut several songs penned by Shafer. She also recorded the Dave Kirby-penned song, "Letting Go". Smith recalled singing at the top of her vocal register for the song's recording. "Boy; I sang high on that for some reason. It's at the top of my voice! Sometimes that's not a matter of range, it's how it lays on your voice. And that one, you can tell," she told Barry Mazor. Other songs on the album were covers of previously recorded material by other country artists. This included a cover of "The Key's in the Mailbox", which was first a top 20 country single for Freddie Hart in 1960. Also featured is a cover of "I'll Still Be Missing You", which was first a top ten single for Warner Mack in 1969. "Them Old Rainy Lovesick Songs (Are Hittin' Home)" was first recorded by Ferlin Husky while "I Just Had You on My Mind" was first recorded by Sue Richards.

== Release, reception and singles ==
I Never Knew (What That Song Meant Before) was released in August 1974 on Columbia Records. It was the twenty fifth studio release of Smith's career and her fourth with Columbia. The album was originally distributed as a vinyl LP, containing six songs on "side A" and five songs on "side B". The album received a positive response from Billboard magazine, who reviewed it in September 1974. "Using the title of her latest hit single, Connie exploits new songs and some old ones, for a variety of entertainment. She has that style all her own, and once again she included a religious message," the magazine stated. I Never Knew (What That Song Meant Before) debuted on the American Billboard Country LP's chart on September 28, 1974. It spent seven weeks charting, peaking at number 22 on October 26, 1974. It was Smith's highest-charting Billboard album since the release of 1973's God Is Abundant. The album's title track was the only single included. It was first released as a single by Columbia in June 1974. It became a top 20 single for Smith on the Billboard Hot Country Songs chart, peaking at number 13 in August 1974.

== Track listing ==
Side one
No.	Title	Writer(s)	Length
1.	"I Never Knew (What That Song Meant Before)"	Sanger D. Shafer	2:35
2.	"Them Ole Rainy Lovesick Songs (Are Hittin' Home)"	Dallas Frazier; Arthur Leo Owens	2:14
3.	"I Just Had You on My Mind"	Sue Richards	2:59
4.	"I'll Still Be Missing You"	Warner McPherson	2:47
5.	"Because of Yesterday"	Cleon Dewey; Levon Dewey	3:12
6.	"I Wish We'd All Been Ready"	Larry Norman	2:33

Side two
No.	Title	Writer(s)	Length
1.	"Key's in the Mailbox"	Harlan Howard	2:29
2.	"Letting Go"	Dave Kirby; Glenn Martin	2:51
3.	"Never Having You"	Tom T. Hall	2:37
4.	"Did We Have to Come This Far (To Say Goodbye)"	Frazier; Owens	3:17
5.	"Is This All You Hear (When a Heart Breaks)"	Charlie Williams	2:34

== Personnel ==
All credits are adapted from the liner notes of I Never Knew (What That Song Meant Before) and the biography booklet by Barry Mazor titled The Latest Shade of Blue.

Musical personnel

- Byron Bach – Strings
- Brenton Banks – Strings
- George Binkley III – Strings
- Marvin Chantry – Strings
- Carol Leigh Cooper – Organ
- Ray Edenton – Rhythm guitar
- Johnny Gimble – Fiddle
- Carl Gorodetzky – Strings
- Lloyd Green – Steel guitar
- Buddy Harman – Drums
- The Jordanaires – Background vocals
- Kenny Malone – Drums
- Grady Martin – Guitar
- Martha McCrory – Strings
- Charlie McCoy – Harmonica
- Bob Moore – Electric bass, leader
- Leon Rhodes – Guitar
- Hargus "Pig" Robbins – Piano
- Billy Sanford – Electric guitar
- Connie Smith – Lead vocals
- Buddy Spicher – Strings
- Donald Teal, Jr. – Strings
- Gary Van Osdale – Strings
- Stephanie Woolf – Strings
- Chip Young – Guitar

Technical personnel

- Ray Baker – Percussion, producer
- Bill Barnes – Cover design
- Lou Bradley – Engineer
- Al Clayton – Photography
- Ralph Emery – Liner notes
- Jim Hall – Arranger, leader
- Shelly Kurland – Contractor
- Ron Oates – Percussion, leader
- Rob Reynolds – Engineer

== Chart performance ==
Chart (1974)	Peak position
US Top Country Albums (Billboard)	22

== Release history ==
Region	Date	Format	Label	Ref.
North America	August 1974	Vinyl	Columbia Records	
