= I Don't Wanna Talk It Over Anymore (song) =

Single by Connie Smith

from the album I Don't Wanna Talk It Over Anymore
- B-side: "You Crossed My Mind a Thousand Times a Day"
- Released: October 1976
- Genre: Country
- Label: Columbia
- Songwriter(s): Eddy Raven
- Producer(s): Ray Baker

Connie Smith singles chronology
"So Sad (To Watch Good Love Go Bad)" (1976)	"I Don't Wanna Talk It Over Anymore" (1976)	"The Latest Shade of Blue" (1977)

"I Don't Wanna Talk It Over Anymore" is a single by American country music artist Connie Smith. Released in October 1976, the song reached #13 on the Billboard Hot Country Singles chart. The song was issued onto Smith's 1976 studio album that was released under the same name as the single. "I Don't Wanna Talk It Over Anymore" was Smith's final major hit single under Columbia Records.

== Chart performance ==
Chart (1976)	Peak position
U.S. Billboard Hot Country Singles	13
