= I'm Sorry If My Love Got in Your Way =

Single by Connie Smith

from the album Connie Smith Now
- B-side: "A Plenty of Time"
- Released: September 1971
- Genre: Country
- Label: RCA Victor
- Songwriter(s): Dallas Frazier, Sanger D. Shafer
- Producer(s): Bob Ferguson

Connie Smith singles chronology
"Just One Time" (1971)	"I'm Sorry If My Love Got in Your Way" (1971)	""Just for What I Am" (197)"

"I'm Sorry If My Love Got in Your Way" is a single by American country music artist Connie Smith. Released in September 1971, the song reached #14 on the Billboard Hot Country Singles chart. Originally, "I'm Sorry If My Love Got in Your Way" was not released on an album, but in 1974 it was issued on Smith's compilation Connie Smith Now.

== Chart performance ==
Chart (1971)	Peak position
U.S. Billboard Hot Country Singles	14
