= Chris Kroeze =

American singer

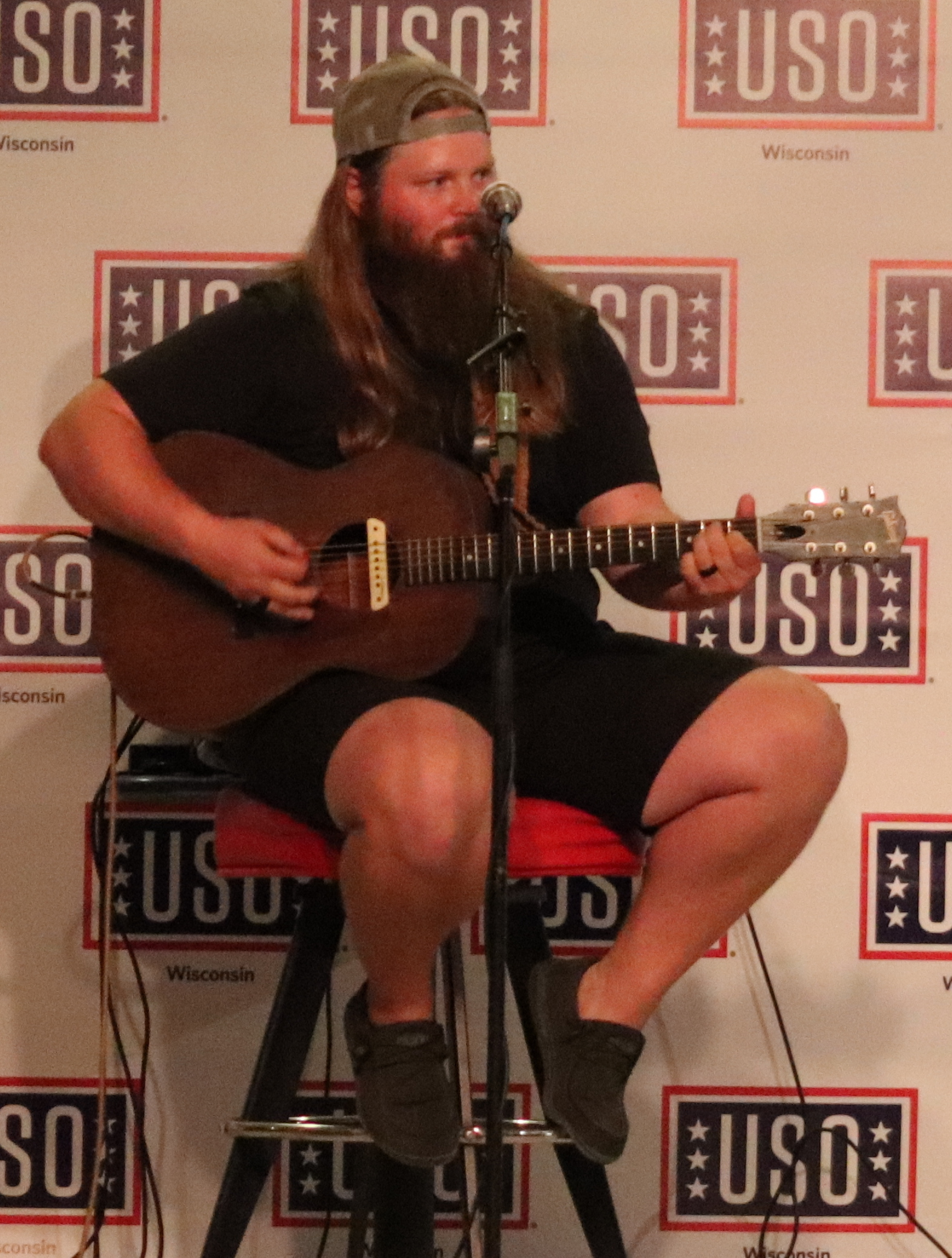
- Kroeze in 2021

Background information
- Born: January 28, 1991 (age 35); Barron, Wisconsin, United States
- Occupation: Singer
- Years active: 2018–present
- Labels: Republic
- Spouse: Mara Kroeze
- Website: www.chriskroezemusic.com

Chris Kroeze (born January 28, 1991) is an American country singer. He is the runner-up of season 15 of the American talent competition The Voice at the age of 27.

== Early life ==
Chris was born and raised in Barron, Wisconsin. He learned to play the guitar when he was six after his parents bought him a guitar. He started singing in middle school when he was 13 years old and started performing in local bars while in high school as part of a local band. He studied audio production and engineering at a college in Minneapolis. He then went to pursue a music career in Nashville, where he recorded a song at the studio of Dierks Bentley. He later returned to Wisconsin. He has performed regularly in the Middle East for the troops.

== Career ==
In 2018, Chris Kroeze entered the 15th season of The Voice. In his blind audition he sang "Pride and Joy" by Stevie Ray Vaughan. Jennifer Hudson and Blake Shelton turned, and he chose to be a part of Team Blake. In his battle, he was paired with folk rock singer Mercedes Ferreira-Dias where they sang Will Jennings and Steve Windwood's "Back in the high life again" and Shelton advanced Kroeze. In the knockout rounds, he was paired with blues rock singer Michael Lee, and though Lee was declared the winner, Shelton used his "save" to advance Kroeze as well. He made it to the finale and placed second in the competition on December 18, 2018.

=== The Voice (2018) ===
==== The Voice performances ====
Stage	Song	Original artist	Order	Result
Blind Audition	"Pride and Joy"	Stevie Ray Vaughan	4.2	Jennifer Hudson and Blake Shelton turned, joined Team Blake
Battles (Top 48)	"Back in the High Life Again" (vs. Mercedes Ferreira-Dias)	Steve Winwood	8.4	Saved by Coach
Knockouts (Top 32)	"Burning House" (vs. Michael Lee)	Cam	13.6	Saved by Coach
Live Playoffs (Top 24)	"Have You Ever Seen the Rain?"	Creedence Clearwater Revival	15.4	Saved by Public
Live Top 13	"Let It Be"	The Beatles	17.1	Saved by Public
Live Top 11	"Long Train Runnin'"	The Doobie Brothers	19.2	Saved by Public
Live Top 10	"Callin' Baton Rouge"	Garth Brooks	21.8	Saved by Public
Live Semifinals (Top 8)	"Jumpin' Jack Flash"/ "Chain of Fools " (duet with Sarah Grace)	The Rolling Stones/Aretha Franklin	23.1	Saved by Public
Live Semifinals (Top 8)	"Can't You See"	The Marshall Tucker Band	23.7	Saved by Public
Live Finale (Final 4)	"Two More Bottles of Wine" (with Blake Shelton)	Emmylou Harris	25.9	Runner-up
Live Finale (Final 4)	"Human" (original song)	Chris Kroeze	25.7	Runner-up
Live Finale (Final 4)	"Sweet Home Alabama"	Lynyrd Skynyrd	25.1	Runner-up

== Personal life ==
Kroeze is married to Mara, and they have two children. Kroeze, known for his music career, has also performed a series of comedy music shows with Micah Terpstra, blending humor and live music in a unique stage act. The duo has toured across the United States, performing in major cities such as New York City, Los Angeles, Chicago, Houston, Phoenix, Philadelphia, San Diego, Dallas, San Francisco, Nashville, and Poskin.

== Discography ==
=== Albums ===
Title	Album details	Peak chart positions		Sales
Title	Album details	US Heat	US Indie	Sales
Chris Kroeze	Release date: February 20, 2019; Label: Chris Kroeze; Formats: Digital download	14	34	US: 1,000

=== Singles ===
Single	Year	Peak chart positions
Single	Year	US Country
"Human"	2018	39
