= Kameron Marlowe =

American singer-songwriter (born 1997)

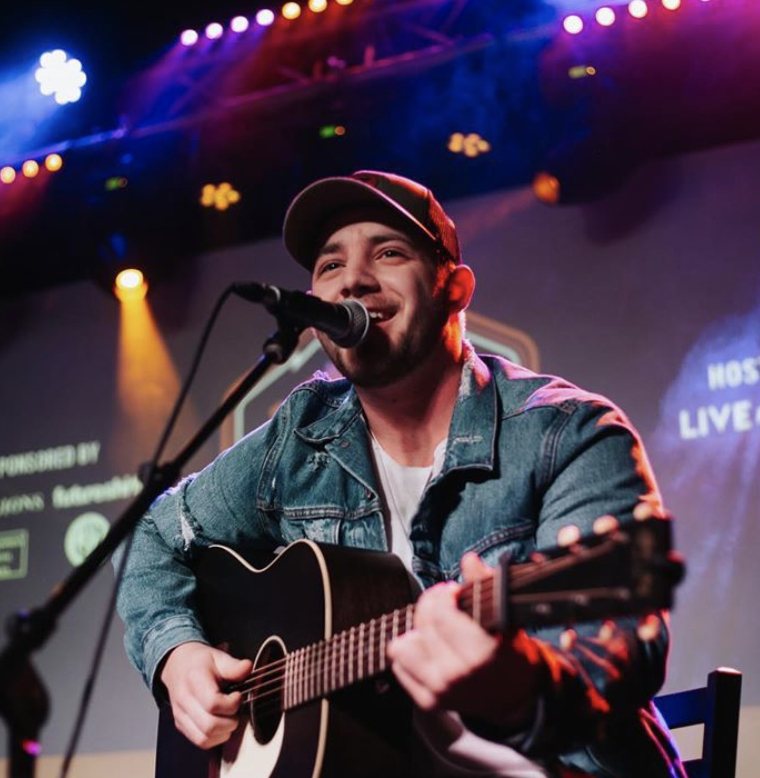
- Marlowe in 2020

Background information
- Born: June 11, 1997 (age 29); Kannapolis, North Carolina, U.S.
- Genre: Country
- Occupations: Singer, songwriter
- Instruments: Vocals, guitar
- Years active: 2018–present
- Label: Sony Music Nashville/Columbia Nashville
- Website: www.kameronmarlowe.com

Kameron Tekoa Marlowe (born June 11, 1997) is an American country music singer-songwriter signed to Columbia Nashville. He was a contestant on season 15 of NBC's The Voice. His debut single, "Giving You Up" was released on June 14, 2019.

== Early life and education ==
Marlowe was born and raised in Kannapolis, North Carolina. He has a younger brother, Aidan. As a child, Kameron became interested in music through his grandfather, who listened to country radio when they went hunting and fishing together. He started singing in church when he was 10 years old and later became a worship leader. Marlowe attended A.L. Brown High School, where he joined a band and performed around town before graduating in 2015.

In 2017, Marlowe's mother was diagnosed with a degenerative disc injury in her back and had to quit her job. To help support her, Marlowe dropped out of college and began working as an auto parts salesman for General Motors while playing gigs locally.

== The Voice ==
While working as a car parts salesman in Kannapolis, Marlowe received a call from a talent recruiter from The Voice who had seen his live performance videos on YouTube. They offered Marlowe a fast track to the series' live auditions. He debuted on the show's Blind Auditions premiere on September 24, 2018. Subsequently, he joined Blake Shelton's Team Blake before being "stolen" by coach Adam Levine later in the season. He was eliminated in the Live Playoffs Top 24 episode on November 13, 2018. Subsequently, Marlowe moved to Nashville, Tennessee to pursue a career as a songwriter.

== Career ==
In June 2019, Marlowe independently released his debut song, "Giving You Up" and followed it with "Take You Up on It" in October. By April 2020, "Giving You Up" had amassed over 15 million on-demand streams, and Marlowe signed a management deal with AMG. That same month, he unveiled a music video for the song, which later premiered on CMT's 12 Pack Countdown. In May 2020, Marlowe signed a songwriting deal with Sony/ATV Music Publishing.

On June 26, 2020, Sony Music Nashville announced that Marlowe had signed a recording deal with its Columbia Nashville imprint. Marlowe released his first song through the label, "Burn 'Em All" on the same day. On September 30, 2021, "Giving You Up" was certified gold by the RIAA, becoming Marlowe's first song to earn a certification.

== Discography ==
=== Studio albums ===
List of studio albums, with selected chart positions
Title	Details	Peak chart positions	
Title	Details	US	US Country
We Were Cowboys	Release date: August 26, 2022; Label: Sony Music Nashville; Format: CD, digital download, streaming	193	22
Keepin' the Lights On	Release date: May 31, 2024; Label: Sony Music Nashville; Format: CD, digital download, streaming	—	43
Sad Songs for the Soul	Release date: February 21, 2025; Label: Sony Music Nashville; Format: CD, digital download, streaming	—	—

=== Singles ===
Year	Title	Peak chart positions		Certifications	Album
Year	Title	US Country Songs	US Country Airplay	Certifications	Album
2021	"Sober as a Drunk"	—	—		Kameron Marlowe
2021	"Giving You Up"	—	45	RIAA: Platinum	We Were Cowboys
2022	"Steady Heart"	43	—	RIAA: Gold	We Were Cowboys
2024	"Strangers" (with Ella Langley)	43	58	RIAA: Gold	Keepin' the Lights On
2025	"Seventeen"	—	51		TBD

=== Other charted songs ===
Year	Title	Peak chart positions			Album
Year	Title	US	US Country Songs	NZ Hot	Album
2020	"Burn 'Em All"	—	36	—	We Were Cowboys
2022	"Girl on Fire"	—	44	—	We Were Cowboys
2025	"Fire on the Hillside"	—	—	36	Non-album songs
2026	"No Need for Leavin'"	75	29	39	Non-album songs

=== Music videos ===
Year	Title	Director
2020	"Giving You Up"	Jeff Johnson
2020	"Burn 'Em All"	Jeff Johnson
2020	"Sober as a Drunk"	Jeff Johnson
2024	"Strangers" (with Ella Langley)	Patrick Tohill
2024	"Never Really Know"	Shane Drake
