= I've Got My Baby on My Mind =

Single by Connie Smith

from the album I Got a Lot of Hurtin' Done Today/I've Got My Baby On My Mind
- B-side: "Why Don't You Love Me"
- Released: November 1974
- Genre: Country
- Label: Columbia
- Songwriter(s): Sanger D. Shafer
- Producer(s): Ray Baker

Connie Smith singles chronology
"I Never Knew (What That Song Meant Before)" (1974)	"I've Got My Baby on My Mind" (1974)	"I Got a Lot of Hurtin' Done Today" (1975)

"I've Got My Baby on My Mind" is a single by American country music artist Connie Smith. Released in November 1974, the song reached #13 on the Billboard Hot Country Singles chart. The song was issued onto Smith's 1975 studio album called I Got a Lot of Hurtin' Done Today/I've Got My Baby On My Mind. "I've Got My Baby on My Mind" was Smith third top twenty hit single issued under Columbia Records. Also, the song peaked at #31 on the Canadian RPM Country Tracks chart around the same time.

== Chart performance ==
Chart (1974–75)	Peak position
U.S. Billboard Hot Country Singles	13
CAN RPM Country Tracks	31
