= Connie Smith Now =

Compilation album by Connie Smith
- Released: July 1974
- Recorded: 1966 – 1972
- Studio: RCA Victor Studios
- Genre: Country
- Label: RCA Victor
- Producer: Bob Ferguson

Connie Smith chronology
That's the Way Love Goes (1974)	Connie Smith Now (1974)	I Never Knew (What That Song Meant Before) (1974)

Connie Smith Now is a compilation album by American country singer Connie Smith, released in July 1974. The album was one of several compilations released after Smith departed RCA Victor. The album's material was previously released, including the singles, "Louisiana Man" and "I'm Sorry If My Love Got in Your Way". The album charted on the American country LP's chart and received a review from Billboard magazine following its release.

== Background, content and recording ==
Connie Smith was signed to the RCA Victor label between 1964 and 1973. With the label, she had 18 top ten Billboard country singles including the eight week number one, "Once a Day". In 1973, she signed with Columbia Records. This prompted RCA to issue a series of compilation albums of Smith's material. The label issued many of these discs between 1973 and 1974. One of its final compilations from this period was Connie Smith Now. The album contained ten tracks, eight of which were previously released as album cuts or singles. Included were two top 20 country singles: "Louisiana Man" (1970) and "I'm Sorry If My Love Got in Your Way" (1971).

Other selections appeared on previously released albums, such as Smith's cover of "Seattle". The eight previously released tracks were recorded in sessions held between 1966 and 1971.Two songs were previously recorded but never-before released: "Someone to Give My Love To" and "I'm So Glad". These selections were recorded in 1972. Bob Ferguson served as producer on all of the album's tracks and all sessions were held at RCA Victor Studios in Nashville, Tennessee.

== Release and reception ==
Connie Smith Now was released by the RCA Victor label in July 1974. It was the sixth compilation of Smith's music released by the label. It was distributed as a vinyl LP, containing five songs on each side of the record. The compilation was reviewed by Billboard magazine in 1974, which gave it a positive reception: "Although it's titled 'Now', the album contains some previously released material. Nonetheless, it's all great material, and contains some new things which are bound to result in singles." Connie Smith Now entered the American Billboard Country LP's chart on August 31, 1974. It spent five weeks on the chart, peaking at the number 40 position on September 21, 1974. It was Smith's second-lowest charting album in her career on the publication survey.

== Track listing ==
Side one
No.	Title	Writer(s)	Length
1.	"Someone to Give My Love To"	Jerry Foster; Bill Rice	2:54
2.	"Seattle"	Jack Keller; Hugo Montenegro; Ernie Sheldon	2:56
3.	"Back in Baby's Arms"	Bob Montgomery	2:05
4.	"I'm So Glad"	Neal Matthews, Jr.; Gordon Stoker	2:15
5.	"Now"	Paul Parnes; Herb Strizik	3:36

Side two
No.	Title	Writer(s)	Length
1.	"I'm Sorry If My Love Got in Your Way"	Dallas Frazier; Sanger D. Shafer	2:14
2.	"Louisiana Man"	Doug Kershaw	2:23
3.	"You Are Gone"	Johnny Carver	2:14
4.	"Born to Sing"	Cy Coben	2:06
5.	"Plenty of Time"	Clay McLean	3:04

== Chart performance ==
Chart (1974)	Peak position
US Top Country Albums (Billboard)	40

== Release history ==
Region	Date	Format	Label	Ref.
North America	July 1974	Vinyl	RCA Victor Records	
