= Let's Fall to Pieces Together =

Single by George Strait

from the album Right or Wrong
- B-side: "You're the Cloud I'm On (When I'm High)"
- Released: May 17, 1984
- Recorded: July 19, 1983
- Studio: Woodland (Nashville, Tennessee)
- Genre: Country
- Length: 2:55 (album version); 2:21 (single edit)
- Label: MCA 52392
- Songwriters: Dickey Lee, Tommy Rocco, Johnny Russell
- Producer: Ray Baker

George Strait singles chronology
"Right or Wrong" (1984)	"Let's Fall to Pieces Together" (1984)	"Does Fort Worth Ever Cross Your Mind" (1984)

"Let's Fall to Pieces Together" is a song written by Dickey Lee, Johnny Russell, and Tommy Rocco, and recorded by American country music singer George Strait. It was released in May 1984 as the third and final single from the album Right or Wrong. The song became George Strait's fifth number one hit on the country chart.

== Content ==
The narrator is a man who has lost the love of his life. He heads to the jukebox and while playing sad songs, he notices another woman going through the same situation. He pitches the idea that maybe if they spent some time together they could comfort each other's loss. The song states that alone is much better together.

== Critical reception ==
Dan Milliken of Country Universe gave the song a 'B' grade, saying that it has a great title that says it all upfront. He goes on to say that "the melody here lands just shy of memorable, and ditto to the story, which never takes its characters deeper than their first encounter at the jukebox." He refers to the song as the kind that will be "destined to be played at jukeboxes" and says "the title pops out enough to ensure you’ll pick it."

== Charts ==
=== Weekly charts ===
Chart (1984)	Peak position
US Hot Country Songs (Billboard)	1
Canadian RPM Country Tracks	1

=== Year-end charts ===
Chart (1984)	Position
US Hot Country Songs (Billboard)	8
