= That's the Way Love Goes (Connie Smith album) =

Studio album by Connie Smith
- Released: March 1974
- Recorded: January 22 – October 31, 1973
- Studio: Columbia Studio B
- Genre: Country
- Label: Columbia
- Producer: Ray Baker

Connie Smith chronology
God Is Abundant (1973)	That's the Way Love Goes (1974)	Connie Smith Now (1974)

Singles from That's the Way Love Goes
- 1. "Ain't Love a Good Thing" Released: September 1973; 2. "Dallas" Released: February 1974

That's the Way Love Goes is the twenty-second solo studio album by American country singer Connie Smith. It was released in March 1974 on Columbia Records and contained 11 tracks. The album included both original material and covers of songs first recorded by other music artists. Two singles were released from the album. "Ain't Love a Good Thing" reached the top ten of the American country songs chart and became her nineteenth top ten single in her career.

== Background ==
Connie Smith had 18 top ten country chart singles between 1964 and 1973 at the RCA Victor label. She signed with Columbia Records in 1973 where she continued to have commercial success, but with less frequency. At Columbia, Smith made two studio albums with producer George Richey. However, their professional endeavors ended in creative differences and Smith sought out Ray Baker to record her next Columbia project titled That's the Way Love Goes. At the time of the album's making, Smith was pregnant with her first daughter and she was not able to record a full-length project. Instead, the label brought forward three songs from studio sessions Smith had cut several months earlier.

== Recording and content ==
That's the Way Love Goes was recorded at Columbia Studio B, which was located in Nashville, Tennessee. Ray Baker produced a majority of the album's sessions, with Richey serving as a producer on the three-previously cut songs. Smith entered the studio to record the project on September 19, 1973. Only one song, "Be All Right in Arkansas", was used for the album. She also went in on October 30 and October 31, 1973 to finish the album. All songs recorded during the latter two sessions were used on the project. Columbia pulled "Ain't Love a Good Thing" (produced by George Richey) from her first session with the label on January 22, 1973. They also took "The Wonders You Perform" from a session on May 15, 1973. "The Baptism of Jesse Taylor" was taken from a June 1973 session and was first released on her 1973 album, God Is Abundant. Baker and Smith chose the album's material together. According to Baker himself, the demonstration version of the song would be played for the musicians at the recording session and three songs would be recorded over three hours.

The project consisted of 11 tracks in total. Among the album's new material was "My Uncle Abel", which biographer Barry Mazor described as "Cajun-influenced" and as a "family saga song". "Ain't Love a Good Thing" was also a new recording, but had not yet been released although it had been recorded on a previous session. "Dallas" was another new track and was written by Leona Williams. According to Mazor, Williams sang the song in concert with then-husband Merle Haggard before Smith cut the song herself. "Be All Right in Arkansas" was another new recording.

Several songs on the album were cover versions of songs first cut by other artists. Among the album's covers was "The Wonders You Perform", which was a top ten single by Tammy Wynette. According to the song's writer (Jerry Chesnut), Elvis Presley had intended to record the song based on Smith's version cut for That's the Way Love Goes. However, Presley never got around to recording the track before his 1977 death. Smith also recorded a solo version of the George Jones and Tammy Wynette duet, "We're Gonna Hold On". The original had been a number one country single. The album's title track was first a number one single for Johnny Rodriguez before Smith cut the song. The song's writer (Sanger D. Shafer) altered the lyrics so it could be song from a female's perspective, according to Barry Mazor. Smith also chose to record a cover of the pop single for the album, "Tie a Yellow Ribbon Round the Ole Oak Tree".

== Release, chart performance and singles ==
That's the Way Love Goes was released by Columbia Records in March 1974. It was the twenty fourth studio album released in Smith's career and her third with the Columbia label. The album was distributed as a vinyl LP. Six songs were featured on "side A" and five songs were featured on "side B". The album entered the American Billboard Country LP's chart on March 30, 1974. It spent eight weeks on the chart, peaking at number 41 on April 27, 1974. It was Smith's first album to chart outside the Billboard top 40 in her career. Two singles were included on the album. Its first was "Ain't Love a Good Thing", which was issued by Columbia in September 1973. The song became Smith's nineteenth top ten single on the Billboard Hot Country Songs, peaking at the number ten position in January 1974. It also reached the number 12 position on Canada's RPM Country chart in 1974. "Dallas" was the second single included on the album and was first released in February 1974. The single peaked at number 35 on the Billboard country songs chart in May 1974.

== Track listing ==
Side one
No.	Title	Writer(s)	Length
1.	"That's the Way Love Goes"	Lefty Frizzell; Sanger D. Shafer	2:45
2.	"Dallas"	Leona Williams	1:55
3.	"Tie a Yellow Ribbon Round the Ole Oak Tree"	Irwin Levine; L. Russell Brown	2:45
4.	"Be All Right in Arkansas"	Billy Burns; Jerry House	2:27
5.	"Thanks a Lot for Trying, Anyway"	Jim Glaser	2:43
6.	"The Baptism of Jesse Taylor"	Dallas Frazier; Shafer	2:30

Side two
No.	Title	Writer(s)	Length
1.	"Ain't Love a Good Thing"	Frazier	2:40
2.	"Teddy Bear Song"	Don Earl; Nick Nixon	2:54
3.	"My Uncle Abel"	Billy Edd Wheeler	2:29
4.	"The Wonders You Perform"	Jerry Chesnut	3:50
5.	"We're Gonna Hold On"	Earl Montgomery; George Jones	3:03

== Personnel ==
All credits are adapted from the liner notes of That's the Way Love Goes and the biography booklet by Barry Mazor titled The Latest Shade of Blue.

Musical personnel

- Willie Ackerman – drums
- Brenton Banks – strings
- George Binkley III – strings
- Jerry Carrigan – drums
- Marvin Chantry – strings
- Dorothy Delenoibus – background vocals
- Ray Edenton – guitar
- Johnny Gimble – fiddle, mandolin
- Lloyd Green – dobro, steel guitar
- Buddy Harman – drums
- Holladay Sisters – background vocals
- John Hughey – steel guitar
- Leo Jackson – guitar
- The Jordanaires – background vocals
- Charles Justice – guitar
- Martin Kathan – strings
- Shane Keister – keyboards
- David Kirby – guitar, leader
- Kenny Malone – drums
- Grady Martin – guitar
- Charlie McCoy – harmonica, vibes
- Bob Moore – bass
- Billy Sanford – electric guitar
- R. Stevie Moore - bass
- Leon Rhodes – electric guitar
- George Richey – piano
- Hargus "Pig" Robbins – organ, piano
- Connie Smith – lead vocals
- Carol Lee Snow – organ
- Henry Strzelecki – electric bass
- Donald Teal, Jr. – strings
- Bobby Thompson – banjo, guitar
- Gary Van Osdale – strings
- Pete Wade – guitar
- Stephanie Woolf – strings
- Chip Young – guitar

Technical personnel

- Ray Baker – producer
- Lou Bradley – engineer
- Shelly Kurland – contractor
- Rob Reynolds – engineer
- George Richey – producer (tracks A6, B1, B4 only)
- Bill Walker – percussion, vibes
- Bergen White – arranger

== Chart performance ==
Chart (1974)	Peak position
US Top Country Albums (Billboard)	41

== Release history ==
Region	Date	Format	Label	Ref.
North America	March 1974	Vinyl	Columbia Records	
