= Reagan Strange =

American singer

- Born: July 28, 2004 (age 22); Memphis, Tennessee, United States
- Occupations: Singer, actress
- Years active: 2018–present
- Labels: Republic; Red Street

Reagan Strange (born July 28, 2004) is an American singer and actress. She took part in season 15 of the American talent competition The Voice at the age of 14 and reached the semifinal.

== Early life ==
Reagan was born on July 28, 2004, in Memphis, Tennessee. She made regular appearances on the game show, Are You Smarter Than A 5th Grader with Jeff Foxworthy, in 2015, where she said she hoped to make a career out of singing, acting, and dancing.

== Career ==
In 2018, Reagan Strange entered the fifteenth season of The Voice. In her blind audition, she sang "Meant to Be" by Bebe Rexha (featuring Florida Georgia Line). Adam Levine and Blake Shelton turned their chairs, and Strange chose to be a part of Team Adam.

During the Top 10, Strange performed "Cry" by Faith Hill, but the next day, she was too ill to stand on stage with her fellow competitors during the Top 10 results show. She remained backstage, although she was shown on camera briefly a few times, wearing a bathrobe and sitting with her parents. After host Carson Daly announced the seven artists who were slated to move on to the semifinals, it was revealed that Reagan Strange, along with her Team Adam teammate DeAndre Nico and Team Blake artist Dave Fenley, were in the bottom 3. With the way that The Voice is formatted, singers who ended up with the lowest number of votes out of their fellow competitors had to sing in an "Instant Save" performance against another singer, or singers, with low votes, after which the viewing audience would vote for which singer deserved to stay. The other singer(s) would be eliminated. While DeAndre Nico and Dave Fenley sang "All of Me" by John Legend and "Amazed" by Lonestar in their respective Instant Save performances, Strange did not perform at all. Compounding the controversy around the situation was that some perceived Adam Levine to have favored Strange in spite of her refusal to perform, since immediately after Nico finished performing, Levine asked voters to vote for Strange instead of acknowledging Nico's performance. Some suggested that Reagan should not have been allowed to participate in the Instant Save voting and should have been immediately eliminated due to her refusal to perform, considering the nature of the show being a singing competition. In the end, Strange controversially won the Instant Save and advanced to the semifinals, while DeAndre Nico and Dave Fenley were eliminated from the competition.

Strange made it to the semifinal round and ended up in the middle three, giving her another chance to perform in an Instant Save for a chance to make it to the finale. She was eliminated after performing "Wherever You Will Go" by The Calling in the Instant Save.

=== The Voice (2018) ===
– Studio version of performance was the most streamed song on Apple Music

==== The Voice performances ====
Stage	Song	Original artist	Order	Result
Blind Audition	"Meant to Be"	Bebe Rexha (featuring Florida Georgia Line)	4.1	Adam Levine and Blake Shelton turned, joined Team Adam
Battles (Top 48)	"Photograph" (vs. Emily Hough)	Ed Sheeran	9.2	Saved by Coach
Knockouts (Top 32)	"Dancing On My Own" (vs. RADHA)	Robyn	11.4	Saved by Coach
Live Playoffs (Top 24)	"Worth It"	Danielle Bradbery	15.18	Saved by Public
Live Top 13	"You Say"	Lauren Daigle	17.13	Saved by Public
Live Top 11	"Complicated"	Avril Lavigne	19.3	Saved by Public
Live Top 10	"Cry"	Faith Hill	21.2	Bottom three
Live Top 10	N/A			Saved by Instant Save
Live Semifinals (Top 8)	"Happy"/ "Tightrope " (duet with Kennedy Holmes)	Pharrell Williams/Janelle Monáe	23.1	Middle three
Live Semifinals (Top 8)	"You Are the Reason"	Calum Scott	23.6	Middle three
Live Semifinals (Top 8)	"Wherever You Will Go"	The Calling	24.2	Eliminated

== Discography ==
=== Singles ===
Single	Year	Peak chart positions
Single	Year	US Country
"Tell Me I Can't"	2019	
"Warrior"	2019	
"Rhiannon"	2019	
"Yesterday"	2019	

== Filmography ==
Year	Title	Role	Notes
2015	Are You Smarter than a 5th Grader?	Herself / Student	Season 4
2016	Bizaardvark	Blobfish Music Video Girl #2	Episode: "First!"
2017	Coming Home	Cousin 1	
2018	The Voice	Herself	Contestant on (season 15)

== Music videos ==
List of music videos, showing year released and director(s)
Title	Year	Director	Ref.
"Warrior"	2019	Carl Diebold	
"Rhiannon"	2019	Carl Diebold	
"Yesterday"	2019	Carl Diebold	
"Never Alone"	2019	Carl Diebold	
