= Just One Time (song) =

Single by Don Gibson

from the album Look Who's Blue
- B-side: "I May Never Get to Heaven"
- Released: February 1960
- Genre: Country
- Label: RCA Victor
- Songwriter(s): Don Gibson
- Producer(s): Chet Atkins

Don Gibson singles chronology
"Big Hearted Me" (1959)	"Just One Time" (1960)	"Far, Far Away" (1960)

"Just One Time"

Single by Connie Smith

from the album Just One Time
- B-side: "Don't Walk Away"
- Released: April 1971
- Genre: Country
- Label: RCA Victor
- Songwriter(s): Don Gibson
- Producer(s): Bob Ferguson

Connie Smith singles chronology
"Where Is My Castle" (1970)	"Just One Time" (1971)	"I'm Sorry If My Love Got in Your Way" (1971)

"Just One Time" is a single written and originally recorded by American country music artist Don Gibson. Released in February 1960, the song reached #2 on the Billboard Hot Country Singles chart, while also reaching #29 on the Billboard Pop chart. The single was later released on Gibson's album Look Who's Blue.

In 1971 American country artist Connie Smith recorded a cover version of "Just One Time" and released it as a single in April 1971. The single peaked at #2 on the Billboard Hot Country Singles chart and #19 on the Bubbling Under Hot 100 singles chart. It became her first single in seven years to reach the latter chart. In addition, "Just One Time" reached #2 on the Canadian RPM Country Tracks chart in 1971. It was released on an album of the same name shortly after.

Others recording the song are Skeeter Davis in 1960 (an answer song as “I Want To See You (Just One Time)”), The Everly Brothers in 1963, Johnny Tillotson in 1965, Frank Ifield in 1966, Kitty Wells in 1971, Dottie West in 1971, Jean Shepard in 1971, Danny Davis and the Nashville Brass in 1971, Chet Atkins in 1971, Renée Martel (in French, as "Si on pouvait recommencer") in 1972, Freddy Fender in 1976, Tompall & the Glaser Brothers in 1981, and Chet Atkins and Mark Knopfler in 1990.

== Chart performance ==
=== Don Gibson ===
Chart (1960)	Peak position
U.S. Billboard Hot Country Singles	2
U.S. Billboard Hot 100	29

=== Connie Smith ===
Chart (1971)	Peak position
U.S. Billboard Hot Country Singles	2
U.S. Billboard Bubbling Under Hot 100	19
CAN RPM Country Tracks chart	2

=== Tompall & the Glaser Brothers ===
Chart (1981)	Peak position
U.S. Billboard Hot Country Singles	17
