= Ain't Love a Good Thing =

Single by Connie Smith

from the album That's the Way Love Goes
- B-side: "I Still Feel the Same About You"
- Released: September 1973
- Genre: Country
- Label: Columbia
- Songwriter(s): Dallas Frazier
- Producer(s): Ray Baker

Connie Smith singles chronology
"Dream Painter" (1973)	"Ain't Love a Good Thing" (1973)	"Dallas" (1974)

"Ain't Love a Good Thing" is a single by American country music artist Connie Smith. Released in September 1973, the song reached #10 on the Billboard Hot Country Singles chart. The song was issued onto Smith's 1974 studio album entitled That's the Way Love Goes. The single became Smith's first major hit and first top ten single under Columbia Records. Additionally, "Ain't Love a Good Thing" reached #12 on the Canadian RPM Country Tracks chart.

== Chart performance ==
Chart (1973–74)	Peak position
U.S. Billboard Hot Country Singles	10
CAN RPM Country Tracks	12

== Cover versions ==
- The New Coon Creek Girls on Ain't Love a Good Thing (1995)
- Ricky Skaggs on Life Is a Journey (1997)
