= Camille Engel =

American painter (born 1955)

Camille Engel (born April 21, 1955) is a self-taught American realist painter currently living in Nashville, TN. Her diverse pictorial themes include contemporary still lifes, landscapes, fruits and flowers, trompe-l'œils, figuratives, and animal portraits. She is best known as a bird artist depicting sharply realistic, colorful birds of intricate detail and textures, characteristically breaking through torn trompe-l'œil holes in her art paper.

Engel's work has been repeatedly featured in Southwest Art, The Artist's Magazine, International Artist. Her oeuvre has received numerous awards, among them the People's Choice Award at the Gilcrease Museum's “American Art in Miniature” exhibition in 2008, and the third place of the Artistic Excellence Competition by Southwest Art in 2015.

== Career ==
Engel was born in Tulsa, OK. She attended junior college at Tulsa Tech, majoring in fine arts while working as a graphic designer in a department store. She continued working in graphic design for a number of years until establishing her own design firm, first in Tulsa (in 1974) and then in Nashville in 1984, where she served corporate clients such as Random House, Fruit of the Loom, Aladdin, MCA, and RCA. She also designed music album covers for a number of artists including George Strait, Reba McEntire, Randy Travis, Hank Williams, Jr. She began painting in 2000 under the guidance of realist painter Charles Brindley. Praise at the gallery scene and competition success came shortly after. She has been painting on a full-time basis since 2003.

== Awards ==
Engel's painting Strike A Pose has won the following distinctions:

- Selection for exhibition at the Sixth Annual Juried Exhibition organized by the International Guild of Realism (2011, Santa Fe, CA)
- Selection for exhibition at the 37th Birds in Art show held at the Leigh Yawkey Woodson Art Museum (2012, Wausau, WI)
- Finalist at the 9th International Salon Competition by the Art Renewal Center in 2012
- Selection by Southwest Art Magazine for publication among the Top 75 yearly album in 2013
- Fourth Place Prize at the "Animals" competition by competition.net in 2014
- Finalist at the Animal/Wildlife competition by The Artist's Magazine in 2015

Awards for other works:

- First Place at the 2016 "Flowers, Plants & Gardens" competition by ArtCompetition.net
- Third Place in the Artistic Excellence by Southwest Art Magazine in 2015
- Finalist at the 2018 International Artist Magazine "Favorite Subject" Challenge
- 2017 "Salon International" by the Art Renewal Center
- 2015 and 2016 "Artistic Excellence Competition" by Southwest Art Magazine
- 2016 "Florals & Gardens Challenge" by International Artist Magazine

== Solo exhibitions ==
- Ellen Noël Art Museum (Odessa, TX)
- Parthenon (Nashville) Museum
- Customs House Museum (Clarksville, TN), October 16 (2018) through January 2, 2019
