= You Look So Good in Love =

Single by George Strait

from the album Right or Wrong
- B-side: "A Little Heaven's Rubbing off on Me"
- Released: September 22, 1983
- Recorded: July 20, 1983
- Studio: Woodland (Nashville, Tennessee)
- Genre: Country
- Length: 3:13 (album version); 2:57 (single edit)
- Label: MCA 52279
- Songwriters: Glen Ballard; Rory Bourke; Kerry Chater
- Producer: Ray Baker

George Strait singles chronology
"A Fire I Can't Put Out" (1983)	"You Look So Good in Love" (1983)	"Right or Wrong" (1984)

"You Look So Good in Love" is a song written by Glen Ballard, Rory Bourke and Kerry Chater, and recorded by American country music artist George Strait. It was released in September 1983 as the lead single from his album Right or Wrong. It was also recorded by Mickey Gilley in 1983, appearing on his album You've Really Got a Hold on Me.

== Cover versions ==
Actor Jamie Foxx covered the song from the television special George Strait: ACM Artist of the Decade All Star Concert.

In 1984, American country music artist Mickey Gilley released a version on his album "You Really Got A Hold on Me."

== Music video ==
A video — Strait's first — was issued for the song. Strait disliked the "slow-paced and romantic themed" video so he asked for it to be taken off the air, and refused to do music videos for several years afterward.

== Chart performance ==
The song debuted at number 31 on the Hot Country Songs charts, Strait's highest debut for many years. In January 1984, "You Look So Good in Love" was George Strait's third No. 1 song on the chart.

=== Weekly charts ===
Chart (1983–1984)	Peak position
US Hot Country Songs (Billboard)	1
Canadian RPM Country Tracks	1

=== Year-end charts ===
Chart (1984)	Position
US Hot Country Songs (Billboard)	40

== Certifications ==
Region	Certification	Certified units/sales
United States (RIAA)	Platinum	1,000,000^{‡}
^{‡} Sales+streaming figures based on certification alone.
