= Ray Baker (music producer) =

American record producer

Ray Baker is a Nashville record producer. His first hit record produced was I Just Started Hatin' Cheating Songs Today by Moe Bandy in 1974. He also produced It Was Always so Easy to Find an Unhappy Woman and It's a Cheatin' Situation, both by Moe Bandy. He also produced all of Connie Smith's albums under Columbia and Monument Records, starting with That's the Way Love Goes in 1974.

Baker also produced duets by Moe Bandy and Joe Stampley. "Good Ole Boys" was a million-selling duet in 1979. In 1983 he produced Right or Wrong by George Strait, his first gold album; singles from that album included the title track, "You Look So Good in Love" and "Let's Fall to Pieces Together."

In 1984, he produced several hit records by Merle Haggard, including Grammy Award-winning That's the Way Love Goes. Ray Baker also produced "Natural High", "Let's Chase Each Other 'Round the Room", "What am I Gonna Do with the Rest of My Life", and "You Take Me for Granted", all number one records for Haggard. In addition, he produced several top ten records for Connie Smith for Columbia Records and Monument Records

Prior to his producing career, Ray was a very successful music publisher. His catalogue contained such hits as "Elvira" "There Goes My Everything" "The Son of Hickory Holler's Tramp","If My Heart Had Windows" "That's The Way Love Goes", "Johnny One Time" and over 35 other Number One Country and Pop Songs from 1966 to the 1990s. His various accomplishments are included in Michael Kosser's best-selling biography How Music City Became Music City USA.
