= David Allan Coe discography =

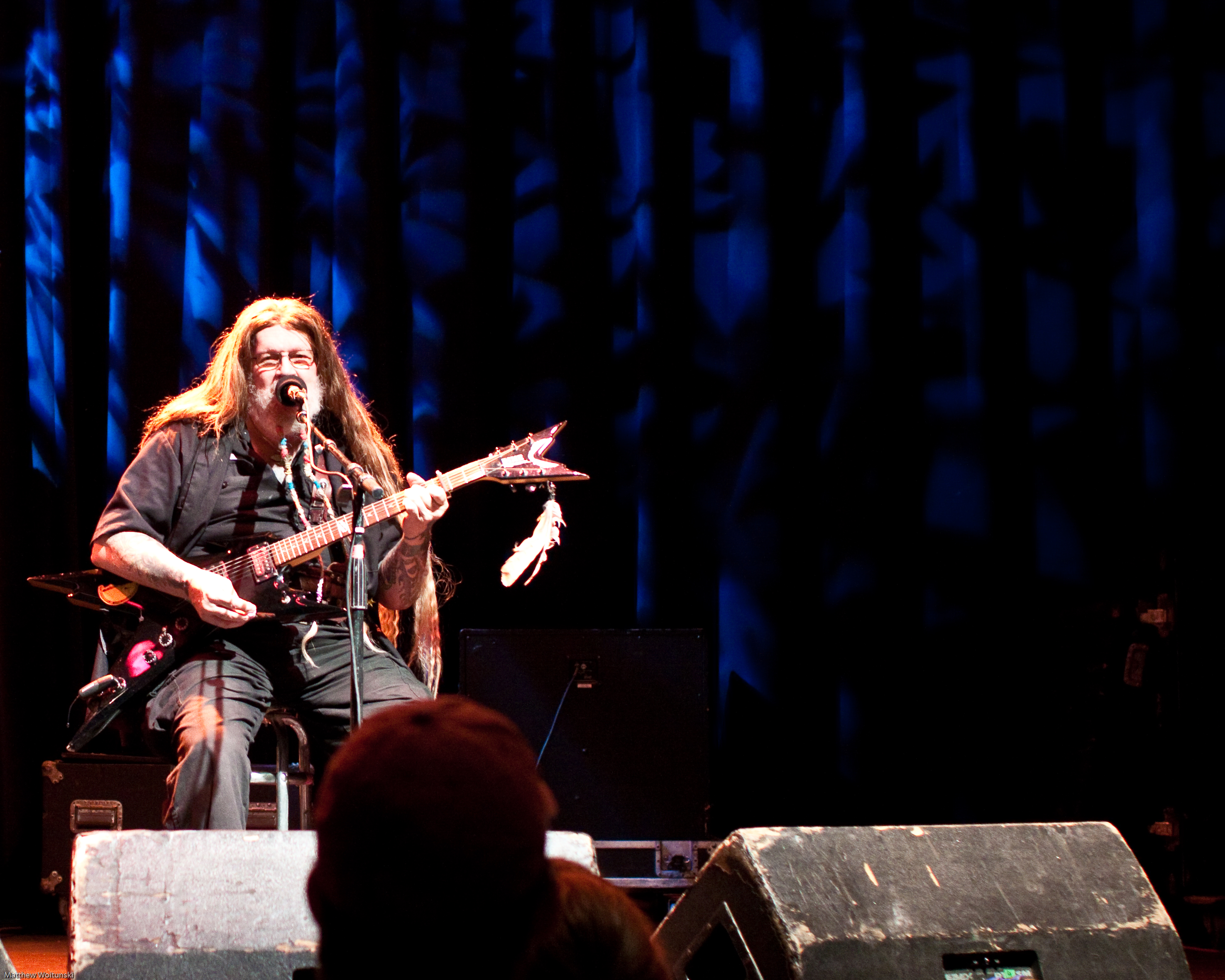
- Coe performing in 2011
- Studio albums: 43 (1 posthumous)
- Soundtrack albums: 1
- Live albums: 4
- Compilation albums: 40+
- Singles: 52
- #1 Singles: 1

American musician David Allan Coe released 42 studio albums and over 50 singles during his life. He started his career in 1970 on SSS International Records before signing with Columbia Records and staying with the label for 15 years. In the 1990s, he released albums through several independent labels such as his own DAC Records. Most of these releases have been reissued under different names and/or cannibalized for various compilations.

== Studio albums ==
=== 1970s ===
Year	Album details	Peak chart positions	Notes
Year	Album details	US Country	Notes
1970	Penitentiary Blues: Label: SSS International; Format: LP, CD, digital	—	Coe's debut album, supposedly written while he was serving a prison sentence. Unlike his later output, his first two records on SSS International are widely considered more blues than country music. Reissued by HackTone Records in 2005 on CD and digital services.
1970	Requiem for a Harlequin: Label: SSS International; Format: LP	—	The rarest album of Coe's discography, consisting entirely of spoken word performances set to music. Reissued digitally by Columbia Records in 2018.
1974	The Mysterious Rhinestone Cowboy: Label: Columbia; Format: LP, CD, digital	—	
1975	Once Upon a Rhyme: Label: Columbia; Format: LP, CD, digital	8	
1976	Longhaired Redneck: Label: Columbia; Format: LP, CD, digital	14	
1977	Texas Moon: Label: Plantation; Format: LP, CD	—	Recorded in 1973 on SSS International and sold to Columbia along with Coe's contract. Finally released in 1977 on Plantation Records and reissued on CD in 2013.
1977	Rides Again: Label: Columbia; Format: LP, CD, digital	26	
1977	Tattoo: Label: Columbia; Format: LP, CD, digital	38	
1978	Family Album: Label: Columbia; Format: LP, CD, digital	47	
1978	Human Emotions: Label: Columbia; Format: LP, CD, digital	45	
1978	Buckstone County Prison (Soundtrack): Label: DAC (#8095N2); Format: LP	—	Accompanying soundtrack album to the film of the same name in which Coe had a starring role. The first album released on Coe's own label, DAC Records. So far it has not been reissued in any modern format.
1978	Nothing Sacred: Label: DAC (#0002); Format: LP, CD	—	Coe's fourth independent album, noted for its profane and sexually explicit lyrics. It was originally released by mail order and also sold at concerts.
1979	Spectrum VII: Label: Columbia; Format: LP, CD, digital	—	
1979	Compass Point: Label: Columbia; Format: LP, CD, digital	—	
"—" denotes a release that did not chart.

=== 1980s ===
Year	Album details	Peak chart positions			Notes
Year	Album details	US Country	US	CAN Country	Notes
1980	I've Got Something to Say: Label: Columbia; Format: LP, CD, Digital	66	—	—	
1981	Invictus (Means) Unconquered: Label: Columbia; Format: LP, CD, Digital	67	—	—	
1981	Tennessee Whiskey: Label: Columbia; Format: LP, CD, Digital	—	—	—	
1982	Rough Rider: Label: Columbia; Format: LP, CD, Digital	—	—	—	
1982	D.A.C.: Label: Columbia; Format: LP, CD, Digital	—	—	—	
1982	Underground Album: Label: DAC (#0003); Format: LP, CD	—	—	—	The second of Coe's two "X-rated" studio albums. It was not sold in stores but through the back pages of the motorcycling magazine Easyriders and at concerts.
1983	Castles in the Sand: Label: Columbia; Format: LP, CD, Digital	8	179	—	
1983	Hello in There: Label: Columbia; Format: LP, CD, Digital	38	—	—	
1984	Just Divorced: Label: Columbia; Format: LP, CD, Digital	23	—	14	
1985	Darlin', Darlin': Label: Columbia; Format: LP, CD, Digital	22	—	—	
1985	Unchained: Label: Columbia; Format: LP, CD, Digital	49	—	—	
1986	Son of the South: Label: Columbia; Format: LP, CD, Digital	31	—	—	
1987	A Matter of Life... and Death: Label: Columbia; Format: LP, CD, Digital	50	—	—	Coe's final studio album release on Columbia Records.
"—" denotes a release that did not chart.

=== 1990s ===
Year	Album details	Notes
1990	1990 Songs for Sale: Release date: September 1, 1990; Label: DAC (#0007); Format: CD, digital	Only sold at concerts upon release, but has since been made available via digital services. Certain tracks were reissued with material from Standing Too Close To the Flame and Granny's Off Her Rocker for Coe's 2001 album Songwriter of the Tear.
1993	Standing Too Close To the Flame: Label: DAC (#0008); Format: CD	Only sold at concerts. Certain tracks were reissued with material from 1990 Songs for Sale and Granny's Off Her Rocker for Coe's 2001 album Songwriter of the Tear.
1993	Granny's Off Her Rocker: Label: DAC (#0009); Format: CD	Only sold at concerts. Certain tracks were reissued with material from 1990 Songs for Sale and Standing Too Close to the Flame for Coe's 2001 album Songwriter of the Tear.
1994	Lonesome Fugitive: Label: King; Format: CD	Features new versions of "If That Ain't Country" and "Mona Lisa Lost Her Smile" in addition to the new recordings "Branded Man", "Six Days on the Road", "I'm a Lonesome Fugitive", "Roll in My Sweet Baby's Arms", "House of the Rising Sun" and "Roll On (Eighteen Wheeler).
1994	The Perfect Country and Western Song: Label: King; Format: CD	Features new versions of "You Never Even Called Me By My Name", "Would You Lay with Me (In a Field of Stone)" "Take This Job and Shove It" and "Please Come to Boston" in addition to the new recordings "Long Black Veil", "Room Full of Roses", "Papa Loved Mama", "Just Because", and "I Can't Help It (If I'm Still in Love with You)."
1994	Truckin' Outlaw: Label: King; Format: CD	Features new versions of "The Ride", "Willie, Waylon and Me" "Ride 'Em Cowboy" and "Tennessee Whiskey" in addition to the new recordings "Frankie and Johnny", "Truck Drivin' Man", "Mama Tried" and "White Line Fever. A compilation of the same name was issued on Gusto Records, but with a completely different track listing.
1996	20 Road Music Hits: Label: TeeVee; Format: CD	Despite the title, only 5 of the tracks included are compiled from previous releases: "Roll On (Eighteen Wheeler)", "Six Days on the Road", "Papa Loved Mama", "Truck Drivin' Man" and "White Line Fever". 15 of this album's 20 studio tracks first appeared on this collection. "The Devil Was to Blame" is a newly recorded version of the same song from 1990 Songs For Sale.
1996	Living on the Edge: Label: DAC (#0010); Format: CD, digital	Only sold at concerts upon release. Living on the Edge has since been made available via digital services.
1997	The Ghost of Hank Williams: Label: King; Format: CD, digital	Contains Coe's renditions of songs that were originally recorded by Hank Williams in addition to the title track, an original that was also included on 1990 Songs for Sale presented here in a re-recorded version.
1998	Johnny Cash is a Friend of Mine: Release date: June 19, 1998; Label: King; Format: CD	Contain's Coe's renditions of some of Johnny Cash's most popular songs. Reissued as Sings Johnny Cash's Biggest Hits in 2003 on Gusto Records (same track listing).
1999	Recommended for Airplay: Release date: March 30, 1999; Label: Sony/Lucky Dog; Format: CD, digital	The title is a playful reference to Coe's two "X-rated" albums, both of which came with a "Not Recommended for Airplay" warning on the cover.

=== 2000s and 2020s ===
Year	Album details	Notes
2000	Long Haired Country Boy... And Other Such Songs: Release date: August 29, 2000; Label: King; Format: CD	Contains Coe's renditions of classic country music songs such as the title track by Charlie Daniels, "Me and Bobby McGee" by Kris Kristofferson and "He Stopped Loving Her Today" by George Jones, among others.
2001	Country & Western: Release date: June 12, 2001; Label: King; Format: CD, digital	Contains Coe's renditions of cowboy songs like "Home on the Range" and "Oh My Darling, Clementine", among others.
2026	A Million Reasons: Release date: October 16, 2026; Label: F3 Entertainment/Symphonic; Format: Digital	Coe’s final studio album, released posthumously. Recorded in 2017 with Average Joes Entertainment and later shelved. Contains new songs as well as re-recordings of “You Never Even Called Me By My Name”, “Take This Job and Shove It” and “Single Father.” Digital-only release.

== Collaborative albums ==
Year	Album details	Peak chart positions		Notes
Year	Album details	US	US Indie	Notes
2006	Rebel Meets Rebel (with Cowboys from Hell): Release date: May 2, 2006; Label: Big Vin; Format: CD, digital	38	2	Recorded with members of Pantera (credited as D.A.C. and Cowboys From Hell) between 1999 and 2003.

== Live albums ==
Year	Album details	Peak chart positions
Year	Album details	US Country
1997	Live: If That Ain't Country...: Release date: July 15, 1997; Label: Columbia; Format: CD, Digital	—
2002	Live From the Iron Horse Saloon: Biketoberfest '01: Release date: September 24, 2002; Label: Coe Pop; Format: CD	—
2003	Country Outlaw: Release date: April 1, 2003; Label: BMG Special Products; Format: CD	—
2003	Live at Billy Bob's Texas: Release date: April 8, 2003; Label: Smith Music Group; Format: CD, digital	71
"—" denotes a release that did not chart.

== Audiobooks ==
Year	Album details	Notes
2002	Whoopsy Daisy: Release Date: November 5, 2002; Label: Coe Pop; Format: CD	2-disc audiobook that was recorded in 1997. Acts as a continuation of Coe's written autobiography.

== Compilation albums ==
Year	Album	Peak chart positions		Certifications (sales threshold)	Notes
Year	Album	US Country	US	Certifications (sales threshold)	Notes
1978	Greatest Hits	40	39	US: Platinum	Has sold a further 1,130,900 copies in the US since 1991.
1981	Encore	—	—		Contains alternate versions of Coe's hits up to 1981, along with the original version of "You Never Even Called Me By My Name".
1984	The Best of David Allan Coe	—	—		
1985	17 Greatest Hits	—	197	US: Gold	
1985	For the Record: The First 10 Years	46	—	US: Gold	
1986	I Love Country	—	—		
1989	Crazy Daddy	—	—		Includes material from Darlin', Darlin', Son of the South and A Matter of Life... and Death as well as two new tracks, "Crazy Daddy" and "I've Enjoyed As Much of This As I Can Stand." Coe's final release as a member of Columbia's roster.
1990	18 X-Rated Hits	—	—		
1991	Biggest Hits	—	—		
1993	The Mysterious Rhinestone Cowboy/Once Upon a Time	—	—		Bear Family Records reissue of Coe's two studio albums The Mysterious Rhinestone Cowboy and Once Upon a Rhyme on a single disc, with the latter sporting a slightly different title on the cover.
1993	Super Hits	—	—	US: Gold	
1994	20 Greatest Hits	—	—		Contains re-recorded versions of Coe's hits from various '90s albums released on King Records. Reissued in 2002 as 20 All Time Greatest Hits with slightly updated cover art and the same track listing.
1994	Longhaired Redneck/Rides Again	—	—		Bear Family records reissue of the two studio albums on a single disc.
1995	Best of the Best	—	—		
1995	Compass Point/I've Got Something to Say	—	—		Bear Family Records reissue of the two studio albums on a single disc with one bonus track.
1995	David Allan Coe, Johnny Paycheck & Others	—	—		
1995	Headed for the Country	—	—		
1995	Human Emotions/Spectrum VII	—	—		Bear Family Records reissue of the two studio albums on a single disc with one bonus track.
1995	Invictus Means Unconquered/Tennessee Whiskey	—	—		Bear Family Records reissue of the two studio albums on a single disc with one bonus track.
1995	The Original Outlaw	—	—		
1995	Tattoo/Family Album	—	—		Bear Family Records reissue of the two studio albums on a single disc with one bonus track.
1996	Super Hits, Vol. 2	—	—		
1996	You Never Even Called Me by My Name (with Johnny Paycheck)	—	—		
1997	Truck Drivin' Songs	—	—		
1999	16 Biggest Hits	—	—		
1999	Castles in the Sand/Once Upon a Rhyme	—	—		Collectables Records reissue of the two studio albums on a single disc with two bonus tracks.
2001	Songwriter of the Tear	—	—		Compiles material from tour-only albums 1990 Songs for Sale, Standing Too Close to the Flame and Granny's Off Her Rocker along with a brand new spoken intro and outro by Coe.
2002	Sings Merle Haggard	—	—		Contains Coe's renditions of some of Merle Haggard's biggest hits, culled from other releases on King Records. "The Fightin' Side of Me, "The Legend of Bonnie and Clyde" and "Sing Me Back Home" are exclusive to this collection. "Reissued as Branded Man on Gusto Records with a slightly different track order.
2002	The Original Outlaw of Country Music	—	—		
2004	The Essential David Allan Coe	72	—		
2005	At His Best	—	—		
2005	Castles in the Sand/Hello in There PLUS	—	—		Bear Family Records reissue of the two studio albums on a single disc with one bonus track.
2005	For the Soul and for the Mind: Demos of '71-'74	—	—		Coe Pop Records compilation of early material that D.A.C. recorded before he became successful with as a Columbia Records recording artist.
2005	Just Divorced/Darlin' Darlin' PLUS	—	—		Bear Family Records reissue of the two studio albums on a single disc with four bonus tracks.
2005	A Matter of Life... and Death PLUS	—	—		Bear Family Records reissue of the studio album with thirteen bonus tracks on a single disc.
2005	The Ride	—	—		
2005	Rough Rider/D.A.C. PLUS	—	—		Bear Family Records reissue of the two studio albums on a single disc with four bonus tracks.
2005	Ultimate Collection	—	—		
2005	Unchained/Son of the South PLUS	—	—		Bear Family Records reissue of the two studio albums on a single disc with five bonus tracks.
2007	Country Hit Parade	—	—		
2007	Early Years	—	—		
2008	Playlist: The Very Best of David Allan Coe	—	—		
2010	D.A.C.'s Back	—	—		Compiles material from Coe's self-released 1990s albums in addition to tracks from his records with Columbia. Unlike similar compilations like Crazy Daddy or Songwriter of the Tear, this album was marketed as "17 never-before-released David Allan Coe originals" via the official album website, despite containing only one previously unreleased track ("Single Father").
2013	The Mysterious David Allan Coe: 4 Classic Albums 1974-1978	—	—		Raven Records reissue of The Mysterious Rhinestone Cowboy, Once Upon a Rhyme, Longhaired Redneck and Rides Again on two discs with five bonus tracks.
2014	The Illustrated David Allan Coe: 4 Classic Albums 1977-1979	—	—		Raven Records reissue of Tattoo, Family Album, Human Emotions and Spectrum VII on two discs with one bonus track.
2017	The Complete Hits	—	—		
"—" denotes a release that did not chart

== Singles ==
=== 1960s and 1970s ===
Year	Single	Peak chart positions		Album
Year	Single	US Country	CAN Country	Album
1969	"One Way Ticket to Nashville"	—	—	—N/a
1969	"Play All the Sad Songs"	—	—	—N/a
1970	"Monkey David Wine"	—	—	Penitentiary Blues
1971	"Tobacco Road"	—	—	—N/a
1972	"Two Tone Brown"	—	—	—N/a
1973	"How High's the Watergate, Martha"	—	—	—N/a
1973	"Keep Those Big Wheels Hummin'"	—	—	—N/a
1974	"(If I Could Climb) The Walls of This Bottle"	80	—	—N/a
1975	"Would You Be My Lady"	91	—	Once Upon a Rhyme
1975	"You Never Even Called Me by My Name"	8	4	Once Upon a Rhyme
1976	"Longhaired Redneck"	17	23	Longhaired Redneck
1976	"When She's Got Me (Where She Wants Me)"	60	—	Longhaired Redneck
1976	"Willie, Waylon and Me"	25	33	Rides Again
1977	"Lately I've Been Thinking Too Much Lately"	49	—	Rides Again
1977	"Just to Prove My Love to You"	82	—	Tattoo
1977	"Face to Face"	92	—	Tattoo
1978	"Divers Do It Deeper"	86	47	Family Album
1978	"You Can Count on Me"	85	—	Human Emotions
1978	"If This Is Just a Game"	45	—	Human Emotions
1979	"Jack Daniel's, If You Please"	72	—	Human Emotions
1979	"Fairytale Morning"	—	—	Spectrum VII
1979	"X's and O's (Kisses and Hugs)"	—	—	Compass Point
1979	"Loving You Comes So Natural"	—	—	I've Got Something to Say
"—" denotes releases that did not chart

=== 1980s ===
Year	Single	Peak chart positions		Album
Year	Single	US Country	CAN Country	Album
1980	"Great Nashville Railroad Disaster (A True Story)"	—	—	I've Got Something to Say
1980	"Get a Little Dirt on Your Hands" (with Bill Anderson)	46	—	I've Got Something to Say
1980	"I've Got Something to Say"	—	—	I've Got Something to Say
1980	"If You'll Hold the Ladder"	—	—	I've Got Something to Say
1980	"Hank Williams Junior Junior" (with Kris Kristofferson and Dickey Betts)	—	—	I've Got Something to Say
1981	"Stand by Your Man"	88	—	Invictus (Means) Unconquered
1981	"Tennessee Whiskey"	77	—	Tennessee Whiskey
1981	"Dock of the Bay"	—	—	Tennessee Whiskey
1981	"Juanita"	—	—	Tennessee Whiskey
1982	"Now I Lay Me Down to Cheat"	62	—	Rough Rider
1982	"Take Time to Know Her"	58	—	Rough Rider
1982	"What Made You Change Your Mind"	—	—	Rough Rider
1982	"Whiskey Whiskey"	—	—	DAC
1983	"The Ride"	4	2	Castles in the Sand
1983	"Cheap Thrills"	45	35	Castles in the Sand
1983	"Crazy Old Soldier"	85	—	Hello in There
1983	"Ride 'Em Cowboy"	48	—	All American Cowboys
1984	"Mona Lisa Lost Her Smile"	2	1	Just Divorced
1984	"It's Great to Be Single Again"	44	31	Just Divorced
1984	"She Used to Love Me a Lot"	11	11	Darlin', Darlin
1985	"Don't Cry Darlin'"	29	35	Darlin', Darlin
1985	"My Elusive Dreams"	—	—	Darlin', Darlin
1985	"I'm Gonna Hurt Her on the Radio"	52	—	Unchained
1986	"A Country Boy (Who Rolled the Rock Away)"	44	—	Son of the South
1986	"I've Already Cheated on You" (with Willie Nelson)	56	—	Son of the South
1986	"Son of the South"	—	—	Son of the South
1986	"Take My Advice"	—	—	—N/a
1987	"Need a Little Time Off for Bad Behavior"	34	46	A Matter of Life and Death
1987	"Tanya Montana"	62	—	A Matter of Life and Death
1988	"Love Is A Never Ending War" (From "Crazy Daddy")	—	—	A Matter of Life and Death
"—" denotes releases that did not chart

=== Guest singles ===
Year	Single	Artist	Album
2017	"Take This Job"	Moonshine Bandits	Baptized in Bourbon

=== Music videos ===
Year	Video	Director
1987	"Tanya Montana"	
2006	"Nothing to Lose" (with Rebel Meets Rebel)	Videobob Moseley
2017	"Take This Job" (with the Moonshine Bandits)	Ken Madson
