= Encore (disambiguation) =

An encore is a performance added to the end of a concert.

Encore(s) may also refer to:

== Businesses and products ==
=== Computing ===
- Encore (software), a music notation software
- Encore Computer, an early maker of parallel computers and real-time software
- Encore, Inc., a software publishing and distribution company
- EnCore Processor, a configurable and extendable microprocessor
- Adobe Encore, a DVD authoring software tool
- Z8 Encore!, a microcontroller by ZiLOG

=== Transportation ===
- Encore, a former train which operated on the current route of the Hiawatha (Amtrak train), which operates between Chicago and Milwaukee
- Buick Encore, a car produced by GM from 2012 onwards
- Norwegian Encore, a Norwegian Cruise Line passenger ship
- Renault Encore, a hatchback variant of the Renault Alliance manufactured by American Motors Corporation 1982–1987
- WestJet Encore, a Canadian airline

=== Other ===
- Encore Books, a defunct American bookstore chain
- Encore Capital Group, an American financial-services company
- Encore Data Products, an American manufacturer of audio and video equipment
- Encore Enterprises, an American real-estate company
- Encore Las Vegas, a casino resort in Las Vegas, Nevada, US
- Encore Music Technologies, a music platform launched by Kid Cudi

== Film and television ==
=== Film ===
- Encore (1951 film), a British anthology film featuring the stories of W. Somerset Maugham
- Encore (1988 film) or Once More, a French film directed by Paul Vecchiali
- Encore (1996 film), a French film directed by Pascal Bonitzer
- Encore, Once More Encore!, a 1992 Russian film

=== Television channels and series ===
- Encore+, a YouTube channel sponsored by the Canadian Media Fund
- Encore (TV series), a 1960 Canadian drama anthology series
- Encore! (TV series), a 2019–2020 American reality series
- Encore! Encore!, a 1998–1999 American sitcom
- Starz Encore, formerly Encore, an American premium television channel

=== Television episodes ===
- "Encore" (Brimstone)
- "Encore" (Law & Order)
- "Encore" (Mission: Impossible)
- "Encore" (So Weird)

== Music ==
- Encore! (singer) (born 1974), German singer
- Encore HSC, an annual performance at the Sydney Opera House
- Encore School for Strings, an American summer music institute
- Encore Series, a series of concert recordings by The Who
- Encores!, a program presented by New York City Center since 1994

=== Albums ===
- Encore (Anderson East album), 2018
- Encore (Bobby Vinton album), 1980
- Encore (Clark Sisters album), 2008
- Encore (David Garrett album), 2008
- Encore (DJ Snake album), 2016
- Encore (Eberhard Weber album), 2015
- Encore (Elaine Paige album), 1995
- Encore (Eddie Bert album), 1955
- Encore (Eminem album) or the title song (see below), 2004
- Encore (George Jones album), 1981
- Encore! (Jeanne Pruett album), 1979
- Encore (Johnny Cash album), 1981
- Encore (Klaus Nomi album), 1983
- Encore (Lionel Richie album), 2002
- Encore (The Louvin Brothers album), 1961
- Encore (Lynn Anderson album), 1981
- Encore (Marina Prior album), 2013
- Encore (Marti Webb album), 1985
- Encore (Russell Watson album), 2002
- Encore (S.H.E album), 2004
- Encore (Sam Cooke album), 1958
- Encore (Sarah Brightman album), 2002
- Encore (The Specials album), 2019
- Encore (Tangerine Dream album), 1977
- Encore (1988 Wanda Jackson album), 1988
- Encore (2021 Wanda Jackson album), 2021
- Encore! (Travels with My Cello – Volume 2), by Julian Lloyd Webber, 1986
- Encore: Live and Direct, by Scooter, 2002
- Encore: Live in Concert, by Argent, 1974
- Encore: More Greatest Hits, by America, 1991
- Encore: Movie Partners Sing Broadway, by Barbra Streisand, 2016
- Encore Woody Herman–1963
- Encore, by David Allan Coe, 1981
- Encore, by Mickey Gilley, 1980
- Encore... For Future Generations, by 4Him, 2006
- Encores (2nd Chapter of Acts album), 1981
- Encores (Jimmy Buffett album), 2010
- Encores (Stan Kenton album), 1949
- American Idol Season 5: Encores, 2006
- Encores (EP), by Dire Straits, 1993

=== Songs ===
- "Encore" (Cheryl Lynn song), 1983
- "Encore" (Eminem song), 2004
- "Encore" (Jay-Z song), 2003
- "Encore" (Yoasobi song), 2021
- "Encore", by Brooke Candy from Sexorcism, 2019
- "Encore", by Catfish and the Bottlemen from The Balance, 2019
- "Encore", by Delta Goodrem from Wings of the Wild, 2016
- "Encore", by Got7, 2021
- "Encore", by Graham Nash from This Path Tonight, 2016
- "Encore", by Jason Derulo from Jason Derulo, 2010
- "Encore", by KSI from Keep Up, 2016
- "Encore", by Red Hot Chili Peppers from The Getaway, 2016

== Other uses ==
- Encore (Australian magazine), defunct film and entertainment industry magazine
- Encore Award, a British literary award
- Encore mandarin, a citrus cultivar
- Encore Theatre Magazine, a British online publication
- Operation Encore, part of the Allies' Italian Campaign in World War II

== See also ==
- Rerun, a repeat airing of a radio or television program
