= 17 Greatest Hits =

Greatest hits album by David Allan Coe
- Released: 1985
- Recorded: 1974–1978, 1980–1985
- Genre: Country
- Label: Columbia Nashville

17 Greatest Hits is a compilation album by artist David Allan Coe featuring highlights from early in his career.

== Track listing ==
No.	Title	Length
1.	"She Used to Love Me a Lot"	3:04
2.	"Mona Lisa Lost Her Smile"	3:41
3.	"The Ride"	3:06
4.	"Now I Lay Me Down to Cheat"	3:22
5.	"Tennessee Whiskey"	2:58
6.	"If That Ain't Country"	4:48
7.	"Longhaired Redneck"	3:20
8.	"Jody Like a Melody"	3:02
9.	"Please Come to Boston"	4:17
10.	"You Never Even Called Me by My Name"	5:12
11.	"This Bottle (In My Hand)"	2:50
12.	"Would You Lay With Me (in a Field of Stone)"	2:51
13.	"Jack Daniel's If You Please"	2:15
14.	"Take This Job and Shove It"	2:57
15.	"Willie, Waylon and Me"	3:15
16.	"Pledging My Love"	3:56
17.	"Hank Williams Junior-Junior"	2:41

== Chart performance ==
Chart (2014)	Peak position
US Billboard 200	197
