= For the Record: The First 10 Years =

Compilation album by David Allan Coe
- Released: 1984
- Genre: Country
- Label: Columbia Nashville
- Producer: Ron Bledsoe, David Allan Coe, Billy Sherrill

For the Record: The First 10 Years is a compilation album by David Allan Coe.

== Track listing ==
1. "You Never Even Called Me by My Name" - 5:14
2. "Please Come to Boston" - 4:17
3. "Jody Like a Melody" - 3:03
4. "Longhaired Redneck" - 3:22
5. "If That Ain't Country" - 4:49
6. "Willie, Waylon and Me" - 3:13
7. "Take This Job and Shove It" - 2:54
8. "Just to Prove My Love for You" - 2:23
9. "Jack Daniel's if You Please" - 3:16
10. "Would You Lay With Me (in a Field of Stone) - 2:49
11. "Divers Do It Deeper" - 3:01
12. "X's and O's (Kisses and Hugs)" - 3:45
13. "This Bottle (in My Hand)" - 2:49
14. "Get a Little Dirt On Your Hands" - 3:39
15. "Stand by Your Man" - 3:27
16. "Tennessee Whiskey" - 2:59
17. "Now I Lay Me Down to Cheat" - 3:22
18. "What Made You Change Your Mind" - 2:49
19. "The Ride" - 3:06
20. "Mona Lisa Lost Her Smile" - 3:39

== Chart performance ==
Chart (1984)	Peak position
U.S. Billboard Top Country Albums	46
