= 29th Academy of Country Music Awards =

US music awards ceremony in 1994

- Date: May 3, 1994
- Location: Universal Amphitheatre, Los Angeles, California
- Hosted by: Alan Jackson; Reba McEntire

Highlights
- Most wins: Garth Brooks; John Michael Montgomery; Alan Jackson (2 each)
- Most nominations: Reba McEntire (7)

Television/radio coverage
- Network: NBC

The 29th Academy of Country Music Awards was held on May 3, 1994, at the Universal Amphitheatre, in Los Angeles, California . The ceremony was hosted by Alan Jackson and Reba McEntire.

== Winners and nominees ==
Winners are shown in bold.

Entertainer of the Year	Album of the Year
**Garth Brooks**; Clint Black; Alan Jackson; Reba McEntire; Travis Tritt	**A Lot About Livin' (And a Little 'bout Love) — Alan Jackson**; Common Thread: The Songs of the Eagles — Various Artists; Hard Workin' Man — Brooks & Dunn; I Still Believe in You — Vince Gill; It Won't Be the Last — Billy Ray Cyrus; This Time — Dwight Yoakam
Top Female Vocalist of the Year	Top Male Vocalist of the Year
**Wynonna**; Mary Chapin Carpenter; Reba McEntire; Pam Tillis; Tanya Tucker	**Vince Gill**; Clint Black; Garth Brooks; Billy Ray Cyrus; Alan Jackson
Top Vocal Group of the Year	Top Vocal Duo of the Year
**Little Texas**; Asleep at the Wheel; Confederate Railroad; Diamond Rio; Sawyer Brown	**Brooks & Dunn**; Clint Black and Wynonna; Darryl & Don Ellis; Reba McEntire and Linda Davis; Reba McEntire and Vince Gill
Single Record of the Year	Song of the Year
**"Chattahoochee"** — **Alan Jackson**; "A Bad Goodbye" — Clint Black and Wynonna; "Ain't Goin' Down ('Til the Sun Comes Up)" — Garth Brooks; "Ain't That Lonely Yet" — Dwight Yoakam; "Does He Love You" — Reba McEntire and Linda Davis	**"I Love the Way You Love Me"** — **Chuck Cannon, Victoria Shaw**; "Can I Trust You with My Heart" — Travis Tritt, Stewart Harris; "Chattahoochee" — Alan Jackson, Jim McBride; "Does He Love You" — Billy Stritch, Sandy Knox; "I Don't Call Him Daddy" — Reed Nielsen
Top New Male Vocalist	Top New Female Vocalist
**John Michael Montgomery**; Doug Supernaw; Clay Walker	**Faith Hill**; Lari White; Kelly Willis
Top New Vocal Duo or Group	Video of the Year
**Gibson/Miller Band**; BlackHawk; Boy Howdy	**"We Shall Be Free"** — **Garth Brooks**; "Chattahoochee" — Alan Jackson; "Cleopatra, Queen of Denial" — Pam Tillis; "Does He Love You" — Reba McEntire and Linda Davis; "What Might Have Been" — Little Texas
Pioneer Award
**Charley Pride**
Career Achievement Award
**John Anderson**

== Performers ==
Performer(s)	Song(s)
Clint Black	"A Good Run of Bad Luck"
Mary Chapin Carpenter	"I Take My Chances"
Brooks & Dunn	"That Ain't No Way to Go"
Faith Hill; Lari White; Kelly Willis	Top New Female Vocalist Medley "But I Will" "That's My Baby" "Whatever Way the Wind Blows"
Lorrie Morgan	"If You Came Back from Heaven"
Billy Ray Cyrus	"Talk Some"
Confederate Railroad	"Elvis and Andy"
Travis Tritt	"Foolish Pride"
John Michael Montgomery; Doug Supernaw; Clay Walker	Top New Male Vocalist Medley "Be My Baby Tonight" "Reno" "What's It to You"
Alan Jackson	"Gone Country"
Diamond Rio	"Love a Little Stronger"
Dwight Yoakam	"Pocket of a Clown"
Tracy Lawrence	"Renegades, Rebels and Rogues"
Pam Tillis	"Spilled Perfume"
BlackHawk; Boy Howdy; Gibson/Miller Band	Top New Vocal Duo or Group Medley "Goodbye Says It All" "She'd Give Anything" "Mammas Don't Let Your Babies Grow Up to Be Cowboys"
Doug Stone	"Addicted to a Dollar"
Vince Gill	"I May Never Get to Heaven"
Reba McEntire	"Why Haven't I Heard from You"
Sawyer Brown	"Hard to Say"

== Presenters ==
Presenter(s)	Notes
Naomi Judd; Luke Perry	Single Record of the Year
Joe Diffie; Michelle Wright; Terry McBride	Top New Female Vocalist
Eddie Dean; Shelby Lynne; Hal Ketchum	Top Vocal Duo of the Year
Suzy Bogguss; Hugh O'Brian	Video of the Year
Finola Hughes; Marty Stuart	Top Vocal Group of the Year
Martina McBride; Pat Sajak; Linda Davis	Top New Male Vocalist
Lisa Hartman Black; Dan Seals	Album of the Year
Mark Chesnutt; James Brolin	Top Female Vocalist of the Year
Randy Travis; Billy Dean	Presented Career Achievement Award to John Anderson
Kathy Mattea; Cliffie Stone; Crystal Bernard	Song of the Year
Chris LeDoux; Lorianne Crook; Charlie Chase	Top New Vocal Duo or Group
Buck Owens; Neal McCoy	Presented Pioneer Award to Charley Pride
Merle Haggard; Jane Seymour	Top Male Vocalist of the Year
Jay Leno	Entertainer of the Year
