= Unchained (David Allan Coe album) =

Studio album by David Allan Coe
- Released: 1985
- Studio: 1111 Sound Studio, Nashville
- Genre: Country
- Label: Columbia
- Producer: Billy Sherrill

David Allan Coe chronology
Darlin', Darlin (1985)	Unchained (1985)	Son of the South (1986)

Unchained is an album released by country musician David Allan Coe, released in 1985 on Columbia Records.

== Recording ==
Unchained was Coe's second album of 1985 and contains the minor hit “I’m Gonna Hurt Her on the Radio,” which got to #52 on the country singles chart. (Charley Pride did better with the more positively framed “I’m Gonna Love Her on the Radio," which hit #13 three years later.) This would be the first studio album Coe recorded for Columbia where he would contribute just one original song, with the songwriter becoming less prolific than he had been earlier in his career, but he scored two Top 5 singles in 1983 and 1984, with “The Ride” and “Mona Lisa Lost Her Smile” respectively, and just missed the Top 10 in 1986 with “She Used to Love Me a Lot.”

While he was relying more on Nashville songwriters, the tunes he and producer Billy Sherrill chose to cover often sounded like they came from his own pen, such as “Ain’t Worth the Powder” and the gentle “Angels in Red,” the latter written by Raybon “Buzz” Rabin and sounding like a paean to prostitutes. (“Someone to listen was all that I wanted/A man can have too many things on his mind…”) Coe's own composition, “He Has to Pay (For What I Get for Free),” tells the story of a kept woman who belongs to a wealthy man but openly carries on an affair with the narrator, who proclaims “I know about him and he knows about me” and the “she comes to me for the things he don’t give her.”

Other songs on the LP suggest Coe may have been trying to rehabilitate his image as a foul-mouthed drug-taking misogynist and racist. Bobby Braddock’s magnanimous “Would They Love Me Down in Shreveport” has a slight gospel flavor as Coe sings about brotherhood and turning the other cheek. He also covers Hoyt Axton’s “Snowblind Friend," an anti-drug song originally recorded by Steppenwolf in 1970 but quite timely in the cocaine-addled 1980s during Nancy Reagan’s war on drugs campaign. The most curious cover on Unchained – and arguably of Coe’s career – is “Southern Man,” Neil Young’s furious indictment of prejudice and racial violence that appeared on his 1970 album After the Gold Rush. Charges of racism levied against Coe largely stem from lyrics contained on his second independent release of explicit material, Underground Album, which came out in 1982. Coe also included the line “Workin’ like a nigger” on “If That Ain’t Country (You Can kick My Ass)” on the 1977 Columbia LP Rides Again. On that basis, Coe doing “Southern Man” can be viewed as profoundly ironic, but Coe also saw irony, later insisting:

Anyone that would look at me and say I was a racist would have to be out of their mind. I have dreadlocks down to my waist with earrings in both ears and my beard is down to my waist and it is in braids...I was in prison with 87% black people and I hung around with black people and learned to sing music with black people. It was ironic that in prison the white guys called me a “nigger lover” and now I write the word “nigger” in a song and I am all of a sudden a racist. It is pretty ironic.” .”

Typically, Coe would muddy the moral waters again on his next album Son of the South, which would display him sitting with a baby in his arms draped in a Confederate flag. The recording of “Southern Man,” along with the bombastic “Even After Forever,” betrays the slick studio sound of the time, as Sherrill did his best to keep Coe contemporary on the eve of the “new traditionalist” movement, which would feature an array of new young country talent that would edge Coe and his outlaw brethren off the country charts for good. As he had on his recent LPs, Coe recorded another hit from the 60s, this time “Unchained Melody,” which was originally the theme for the little-known 1955 film Unchained, from which Coe's LP gets its name.

Unchained peaked at #49 on the country albums chart.

== Track listing ==
1. "I'm Gonna Hurt Her on the Radio" (M. McAnally/T. Brasfield)
2. "Angels in Red' (B. Rabin)
3. "He Has to Pay (For What I Get for Free)" (David Allan Coe)
4. "Ain’t Worth the Powder" (M.D. Barnes/G. Guilbeau)
5. "Would They Love Me Down in Shreveport" (Bobby Braddock)
6. "Unchained Melody" (A. North/H, Zaret)
7. "Snowblind Friend" (Hoyt Axton)
8. "Southern Man" (Neil Young)
9. "Even After Forever" (R. McNeely)
10. "The Fiery Death of Willie Bodine" (J. Bolotin)
