= The Essential David Allan Coe =

Greatest hits album by David Allan Coe
- Released: 2004
- Recorded: 1974, 1975, 1977, 1978, 1981, 1983, 1984, 1985, 1987
- Genre: Country
- Length: 47:08
- Labels: Legacy, Columbia
- Producers: Ron Bledsoe, Billy Sherrill, David Allan Coe, Waylon Jennings, Gregg Geller

Professional ratings
Review scores
| Source | Rating |
|---|---|
| Tom Hull | B+ |

The Essential David Allan Coe is a compilation album of highlights from singer/songwriter David Allan Coe's career.

== Track listing ==
All songs written by David Allan Coe except where noted

1. "The Ride" (J.B. Detterline Jr, Gary Gentry) - 3:07
2. "Would You Lay With Me (in a Field of Stone)" - 2:49
3. "You Never Even Called Me By My Name" (Steve Goodman) - 5:14
4. "Willie, Waylon and Me" - 3:12
5. "Longhaired Redneck" (David Allan Coe, Jimmy Rabbitt) - 3:21
6. "If That Ain't Country" (David Allan Coe, Fred Spears) - 4:49
7. "Take This Job and Shove It" - 2:57
8. "(If I Could Climb) The Walls of the Bottle" (Don Goodman, Dan Seals) - 2:15
9. "Jack Daniel's, If You Please" - 3:17
10. "Tennessee Whiskey" (Dean Dillon, Linda Hargrove) - 2:59
11. "Now I Lay Me Down to Cheat" (Walt Aldridge, Billy Henderson) - 3:22
12. "Mona Lisa Lost Her Smile" (Johnny Cunningham) - 3:39
13. "Don't Cry Darlin'" (Dean Dillion) - 2:49
14. "Need a Little Time Off for Bad Behavior" (Bobby Keel, David Allan Coe, Larry Latimer) - 3:00

== Chart performance ==
| Chart (2004) | Peak position |
|---|---|
| U.S. Billboard Top Country Albums | 72 |
