= Son of the South =

Son of the South may refer to:

- Son of the South (film), a 2020 American biographical drama film
- Son of the South (album), a 1986 album by David Allan Coe
- Son of the South, a 2017 album by Upchurch (musician)
- "Son of the South", a song by the Afghan Whigs from their 1990 album Up in It

== See also ==
- Sons of the South, Lebanese terrorist group
