= Rides Again =

Rides Again or Ride Again may refer to:

- James Gang Rides Again, a 1970 album by the James Gang
- Rides Again (David Allen Coe album), 1977
- Rides Again, a 1987 album by Lazy Lester
- Rides Again (band), a Canadian rock band
- Ride Again (EP), 2019 release by the Shakespears Sister
- Ride Again (album), 1988 release by the Purple Helmets
