= Unchained =

Unchained may refer to:

== Film and TV ==
- Tour de France: Unchained, a 2023 TV series
- Unchained (film), a 1955 American prison film
- The Man Who Broke 1,000 Chains or Unchained, a 1987 film
- "Unchained" (Arrow), a 2016 television episode
- "Unchained" (Law & Order: Criminal Intent), a 2005 television episode
- "Unchained" (Quantum Leap), a 1991 television episode

== Music ==
- Unchained (David Allan Coe album), 1985
- Unchained (Johnny Cash album), 1996
- Unchained (Molly Sandén album), 2012
- Unchained (EP), a 1983 EP by Thor
- "Unchained" (song), a 1981 song by Van Halen
- Unchained, a 1995 album by Celinda Pink
- Unchained, a 2009 album by Joe Nina
- "Unchained", a song by HammerFall from the album Glory to the Brave, 1997
- "Unchained", a song by Lacuna Coil from the album Shallow Life, 2009

== See also ==
- "Unchained Melody", the theme song from the 1955 film
