= Son of the South (album) =

Album by David Allan Coe

Studio album by David Allan Coe
- Released: May 1, 1986
- Genre: Country
- Label: Columbia
- Producer: Billy Sherrill

David Allan Coe chronology
Unchained (1985)	Son of the South (1986)	A Matter of Life... and Death (1987)

Son of the South is an album released by country musician David Allan Coe. It was released in 1986 on Columbia.

== Background ==
By 1986, country music entered a new phase as a crop of younger country stars like George Strait, Randy Travis, and Dwight Yoakam emerged to become a dominating presence on country radio. In the coming years, older country stars would find it more difficult to get airplay and see sales dip. Even Johnny Cash, whose name had been synonymous with country music for decades, was dropped by Columbia in 1985. Coe, who originally made a name for himself as a songwriter, composing the 1973 Tanya Tucker hit “Would You Lay with Me (In a Field of Stone)”, gained prominence as part of the 1970s outlaw country movement and steadily released albums throughout the 1980s produced by Billy Sherrill, scoring his biggest hit in 1984 when “Mona Lisa Lost Her Smile” peaked at #2.

== Recording ==
Son of the South is a summit of sorts, being the first time fellow outlaw legends Waylon Jennings, Willie Nelson, and Jessie Colter appeared on a Coe release. Coe composed “Willie, Waylon, and Me” for his 1977 album Rides Again, aligning himself with the outlaw movement (although some critics and fellow musicians viewed this as a dubious imposition), and maintained friendships with both men, despite Jennings cool treatment towards him at times. Jennings drummer Richie Albright called Coe “a great, great songwriter. A great singer. But he could not tell the truth if it was better than a lie he’d made up. Waylon didn’t make him comfortable enough to hang around. But Willie did. I was around Willie quite a bit and David Allan was with him eighty percent of the time. Willie allowed him to hang around.” In his autobiography, Jennings mentions Coe once (in a chapter titled “The Outlaw Shit”), calling him “the most sincere of the bunch” of bandwagon jumpers, but contends “When it came to being an Outlaw, the worst thing he ever did was double parking on Music Row.” Jennings also writes:

He wrote a song called “Waylon, Willie, and Me” at the same time he started taking potshots at us in interviews, saying that Willie and Kris [Kristofferson] had sold out, that I was running around wearing white buck shoes, and none of us were really an Outlaw. He was the only Outlaw in Nashville…I saw him in Fort Worth and I put my finger right up to his chest. “You gotta knock that shit off,” I told him. “I ain’t never done anything to you.” “They just set us up,” he protested. “You know I love you, Waylon”…He could drive me crazy, but there was something about David that pulled at my heartstrings.

Jennings and wife Jesse Colter join Coe on Colter's “Storms Never Last,” which incorporates a light Caribbean feel, while Jennings and Nelson contribute vocals to Coe's composition “I Hate Love.” Nelson joins Coe by himself on the mournful ballad “I’ve Already Cheated on You,” a song the pair wrote together. Another duet, “Couldn’t Do Anything Right” features Karen Brooks, one of Coe's favourite songwriters and regular duet partner. Coe only contributed one original song to his last album Unchained, but appears to have found his muse on this LP, having a hand in writing more than half the songs, including “The Country Boy (Who Rolled the Rock Away),” a tribute to Hank Williams, Buddy Holly, and Elvis Presley that reached #44 on the country singles chart, and the love song “To Help You Love Again,” a co-write with fellow songwriting maverick Shel Silverstein. Of the song "Gemini Girl" Coe later stated, "That song was about one of the weirdest relationships that I was ever in - with the gemini person. I never was able to catch onto the whole 'twin thing.' You have to understand that when they are one, they are not the other." Coe also helped compose the title track, on which is heard Allman Brothers guitarist Dickey Betts.

== Artwork ==
Coe's album covers had been provocative in the past, like the 1977 release Texas Moon, which displays Coe and his associates mooning the camera, and the 1978 release Family Album, which AllMusic Thom Jurek calls “one of the most bizarre covers in David Allan Coe's - hell, anybody's - catalog. He is dressed in a minister's black, flowing robe with an Amish hat, a little blonde girl in his lap, his two - yes, two (of three at one time) - wives standing behind him, and behind them, a black Lincoln Town Car and Coe's Silver Eagle tour bus. The album is dedicated to his two mothers - he's apparently from a Mormon family - and stipulates how difficult it is for a child to have two mothers. It's so surreal one is almost afraid to play the recording.” The cover of Son of the South – Coe, sitting, holding a baby with a Confederate flag draped over his shoulders – was one more in a series of decisions that occasionally alienated Coe from the country mainstream, although Coe did print a message on the back of the album to diffuse any potential backlash:

I was born in Akron, Ohio, and I moved to the South when I was in my early twenties which made me a “yankee” rebel son. I am not against anything or any place or any nationalities. Regardless of what you’ve heard about me, there are two things I am very proud of. One of them is my son Tyler who is my first born son. And the other is my personal relationship with God. I am proud of that relationship as I am proud that my son was conceived in Nashville, Tennessee and he is truly a son of the south.

The line “Regardless of what you’ve heard about me” likely refers to Coe's reputation as a misogynist and a racist, stemming from two independently released albums of explicit material, 1978's Nothing Sacred and 1982's Underground Album, which Neil Strauss called "among the most racist, misogynist, homophobic and obscene songs recorded by a popular songwriter." It is not surprising, then, that the cover of Son of the South would be reinforce negative opinions about Coe. Interestingly, the first born son mentioned in Coe's message, Tyler Mahan Coe, currently is the creator of the popular podcast Cocaine & Rhinestones, which deep dives into the history of country music in the twentieth century. Tyler once toured in Coe's band before being allegedly fired.

== Reception ==
Son of the South reached #31 on the country albums chart.

== Track listing ==
1. "Love Is a Never Ending War" (D. Blackwell)
2. "Storms Never Last" (with Waylon Jennings & Jessi Colter) (Jessi Colter)
3. "Gemini Girl" (David Allan Coe)
4. "To Help You Love Again" (Coe/Shel Silverstein)
5. "Cold Turkey" (Bucky Jones)
6. "A Country Boy (Who Rolled the Rock Away)" (Coe/D. Dillon/B. Cannon/J. Darrell)
7. "Couldn’t Do Nothing Right" (with Karen Brooks) (Karen Brooks/Gary Nunn)
8. "I've Already Cheated on You" (with Willie Nelson) (Coe/Willie Nelson)
9. "I Hate Love" (with Waylon Jennings & Willie Nelson) (Coe)
10. "Son of the South" (Coe/R. Brooks/T. DeLuca/H. Tipton)
