= A Matter of Life... and Death =

A Matter of Life...and Death

Studio album by David Allan Coe
- Released: 1987
- Genre: Country
- Label: Columbia
- Producer: Billy Sherrill

David Allan Coe chronology
Son of the South (1986)	A Matter of Life...and Death (1987)	1990 Songs for Sale (1990)

A Matter of Life ...and Death is an album released by country musician David Allan Coe. It was released in 1987 on Columbia.

== Background ==
A Matter of Life...and Death would be Coe’s final album for Columbia, a partnership that stretched back to 1974 and produced 21 studio albums. Coe and longtime producer Billy Sherrill enjoyed their biggest commercial success together in the 1980s with Top 5 singles “The Ride” and “Mona Lisa Lost Her Smile," but by the end of the decade a new generation of country singers were marginalizing many of the old guard as far as radio play went, with AllMusic writer Thom Jurek observing about this Coe release, “Interestingly, this record sounds so outside the new traditionalist mold dominating Nash Vegas at the time that it was quickly lost to oblivion - despite the fact that it's a true traditional country record in the most strident use of the term.” Like many of his previous albums, A Matter of Life...and Death is a concept album, with side one composed of “Meditations” and side two containing “Dedications.” As recounted by Jurek, the album Coe and Sherrill recorded is one of the singer’s most personal:

The inspiration behind its making was the passing of Coe's father, Donald Mahan Coe, the return home (on the day of his father's funeral) of his 16-year-old daughter from living with her mother for the majority of her life, and the birth of his and Jody Lynn's two children, Tyler and Tanya Montana. Coe and Sherrill are particularly suited to each other on recordings like this. They serve to curb each other's excesses and rely on making sure the right songs come out of the mix, representing the emotional intention of the set rather than burying those songs under production or hyperbole.

The album opens with “The Ten Commandments of Love,” 1950s doo-wop-style ballad that uses guest Johnny Cash’s voice to full omniscient effect. (Cash recorded the Coe composition “Cocaine Carolina” on his 1975 LP John R. Cash, which features Coe on background vocals.) “Jody Like a Melody” originally appeared on Coe’s second LP, 1975’s Once Upon a Rhyme, with the singer stating in 2004, "'Jody Like a Melody' is probably one of my favorite songs because as a songwriter, up until I had written that song, I had been writing songs in three chords, you know, real simple stuff. In that song I wrote the string arrangements and key changes and everything, you know. It opened up a lot of doors for me.” The sentimental “Tanya Montana,” which was co-written with Sherrill and would be released as a single, peaking at #62 on the country singles chart, expresses the love and fears of a father for his young daughter and contains a spoken recitation by Coe, while “Actions Speak Louder than Words” on the Meditations side offers fatherly advice to a son, presumably Tyler Mahan Coe, who would later play in Coe’s touring band and host country music podcast Cocaine & Rhinestones. Sherrill likely had a hand in getting Coe to cover the Bob McDill song “If Only Your Eyes Could Lie,” which the producer recorded a year earlier with George Jones on Jones’s Wine Colored Roses album. The LP’s biggest hit would be “Need a Little Time Off for Bad Behavior,” which rose to #34 and sounded like the records Hank Williams, Jr. was making at the time.

The Meditations side opens with “Southern Star,” a slab of southern rock that tells the story of a midlife crisis: a “blue collar man,” whose “life is a stranger to me,” works in a mill and longs for his youth. The line “Lost in the 80s, that’s where I am” could just as easily be interpreted as a comment on the state of country music at the time for veteran stars like Coe, who would largely disappear from mainstream country radio in the next decade. (Alabama would take the song to the top of the charts in 1989.) Musically speaking, the ambiguously biblical “Child of God” may be the most “80s sounding” song Coe ever recorded, with Sherrill dressing up the track in atmospheric keyboards, while “Wild Irish Rose” is a fiddle and banjo thumping tribute to Coe’s late father. Like the Dedications side, Coe closes the album with a rocker in the form of the title track, which addresses the emotional tailspin of losing a father and gaining a child at the same time. (“Pick up your son and kiss your dad goodbye.”)

The album would reach #50 on the country albums chart.

== Reception ==
AllMusic: This set yielded some of the strongest Coe songs of the 1980s (and that's saying something): ‘Jody Like a Melody,’ ‘If Only Your Eyes Could Lie,’ and ‘The Ten Commandments of Love.’ And ‘Southern Star,’ with its searing lyric and screaming guitar solos, is among his most under-recognized, poetic tomes worthy of being recorded by .38 Special or Lynyrd Skynyrd.

== Track listing ==
All songs written by David Allan Coe except as indicated

Dedications

1. "The Ten Commandments of Love" (with Johnny Cash) (M. Paul)
2. "Jody Like a Melody"
3. "Tanya Montana" (Coe/Billy Sherrill)
4. "If Only Your Eyes Could Lie" (B. McDill/J. Jarrad)
5. "Need a Little Time Off for Bad Behavior" (Coe/B. Keel/L. Latimer)

Meditations

1. "Southern Star" (R. Murrah/S. Dean/R. Alves)
2. "Actions Speak Louder Than Words"
3. "Child of God"
4. "Wild Irish Rose"
5. "A Matter of Life...and Death"
