= Longhaired Redneck =

Studio album by David Allan Coe
- Released: March 1976
- Recorded: 1975
- Studio: Columbia Studio in Nashville
- Genre: Outlaw country
- Length: 28:16
- Label: Columbia
- Producer: Ron Bledsoe

David Allan Coe chronology
| Once Upon a Rhyme (1975) | Longhaired Redneck (1976) | Rides Again (1977) |

Professional ratings
Review scores
| Source | Rating |
|---|---|
| Allmusic | 4/5 stars |

Longhaired Redneck is the fifth studio album released by country musician David Allan Coe. It was released in 1976 on Columbia.

== Recording ==
Longhaired Redneck was Coe's third album for Columbia in three years and the first where he wrote or co-wrote all the songs. Coe had already written several hits for other artists and scored his own Top 10 hit in 1975 with the Steve Goodman-John Prine composition "You Never Even Called Me by My Name." By 1976 the outlaw country movement was in full swing as artists such as Waylon Jennings and Willie Nelson were finally enjoying massive commercial success after years of fighting to record their music their own way. Coe, however, was still somewhat of an outsider, almost too outlaw for the outlaws, a predicament summed up well by Thom Jurek in his AllMusic review of the LP:

His wild, long hair; multiple earrings; flashy, glitzy rhinestone suits; Harley Davidson biker boots; and football-sized belt buckles had become obstacles to getting people to take him seriously as a recording artist. Other singers continued to record and succeed with his material, but the author himself - who was as good a singer as almost anyone and better than most - languished in obscurity. Rather than tone it down, Coe characteristically shoved the stereotypes in their faces. He retired the Mysterious Rhinestone Cowboy persona and billed his new album as "David Allan Coe Rides Again as the Longhaired Redneck," something equally off-putting to institution types.

The outlaw country zeitgeist was summed up well in the title track of Longhaired Redneck, which recounts playing in a dive "where bikers stare at cowboys who are laughing at the hippies who are praying they'll get out of here alive." The song, which has an unmistakable rock swagger, features Coe performing an impressive imitation of Ernest Tubb, making it irretrievably country as well, illustrating the dichotomy of what was being referred to as "progressive" country music. Coe later explained, "It was terminology that I'd made up at the time. I was trying to tell people that not everybody with long hair was a hippie. Not everyone was the kind of person that thought you could punch them out, take their money and that they'd say, 'I won't do nothin' about it.'" The song is also an early example of Coe's penchant for namedropping, as he mentions Merle Haggard and proclaims "Johnny Cash helped me get out of prison."

Several of the songs, such as the prison lament "Revenge" and "Living on the Run," play up to the outlaw image, while "Spotlight" explores the lonely wasted existence of a country singer. ("Roll me a smoke, give me some coke...") and advises the press, "Don't waste your time or your flashbulbs, too many heroes are dead." (In the same AllMusic review, Thom Jurek contends the song "sums up the way he views his life at this particular juncture, and given the lyrics, his mind couldn't have been a nice place to live.") Conversely, Longhaired Redneck also contains songs with warmer themes, such as "Texas Lullaby" ("See those tumbleweeds blowin’, Lord it makes me want to cry/It reminds me of my daddy and that Texas lullaby") and "Family Reunion," which boasts multilayered harmonies and an allusion to the bluegrass classic "Fox on the Run". "Free Born Ramblin’ Man" is a more obvious derivative paean to Southern rock, with its Allman Brothers-like guitar intro and title evoking that band's biggest hit.

Coe is backed by The Nashville Edition and The Jordanaires on vocals, as well as some of Nashville's top session musicians such as Reggie Young and Charlie McCoy.

== Reception ==
AllMusic praised the album, opining "Like most of Coe's '70s material, this one's essential outlaw country that stands the test of time.”

== Track listing ==
All Songs written by David Allan Coe except where noted.

1. "Longhaired Redneck" (Coe, Jimmy Rabbitt) – 3:24
2. "When She's Got Me (Where She Wants Me)" – 2:49
3. "Revenge" (Coe, Jimmy Sadd) – 2:33
4. "Texas Lullaby" (Coe, Ann McGowan) – 4:14
5. "Living on the Run" (Coe, Jimmy L. Howard) – 2:35
6. "Family Reunion" – 4:03
7. "Rock and Roll Holiday" – 2:11
8. "Free Born Rambling Man" – 2:16
9. "Spotlight" – 3:11
10. "Dakota the Dancing Bear, Part 2" (Coe, Larry Murray) – 4:00

== Personnel ==
- David Allan Coe, The Nashville Edition, The Jordanaires – vocals
- Billy Sanford, John Christopher, Tommy Allsup, Reggie Young – guitar
- Pete Drake – steel guitar, dobro
- Mike Leech, Henry Strzelecki, Ted Reynolds – bass
- Kenny Malone, Ralph Gallant, Buster Phillips – drums
- Hargus "Pig" Robbins, Ron Oates – piano
- Buddy Spicher – violin, mandolin
- Charlie McCoy – harmonica, vibes
- The Nashville String Machine – strings
- Billy Sherrill, Ron Bledsoe – production
