= Red and Rio Grande (song) =

Single by Doug Supernaw

from the album Red and Rio Grande
- B-side: "Five Generations of Rock County Wilsons"
- Released: February 5, 1994
- Genre: Country
- Length: 4:00
- Label: BNA
- Songwriter(s): Doug Supernaw, Lonnie Atkinson
- Producer(s): Richard Landis

Doug Supernaw singles chronology
"I Don't Call Him Daddy" (1993)	"Red and Rio Grande" (1994)	"State Fair" (1994)

"Red and Rio Grande" is a song co-written and recorded by American country music artist Doug Supernaw. It was released in February 1994 as the fourth single and title track from the album Red and Rio Grande. The song reached #23 on the Billboard Hot Country Singles & Tracks chart. The song was written by Supernaw and Lonnie Atkinson.

== Chart performance ==
Chart (1994)	Peak position
US Hot Country Songs (Billboard)	23
Canadian RPM Country Tracks	28
