= Darlin', Darlin' =

Studio album by David Allan Coe
- Released: 1985
- Studios: 1111 Sound Studios, Nashville
- Genre: Country
- Label: Columbia
- Producer: Billy Sherrill

David Allan Coe chronology
| Just Divorced (1984) | Darlin', Darlin' (1985) | Unchained (1985) |

Darlin', Darlin' is an album released by the country musician David Allan Coe on Columbia Records in 1985.

== Recording ==
The album is best remembered for its lead off single, "She Used to Love Me a Lot". It was released in December 1984 and peaked at #11 on both the U.S. Billboard Hot Country Singles chart and the Canadian RPM Country Tracks chart. (A version of the song by Johnny Cash was recorded in the early 1980s, but remained unreleased until 2014.)

Thom Jurek of AllMusic observes, "Musically, this is a big production number - even for Billy Sherrill. There are keyboards winding through everything, big backing vocals, and layered pedal steel and electric guitars."

== Reception ==
Darlin', Darlin' reached No. 22 on the Billboard country albums chart. AllMusic says that "...as a singer's recording, as odd as some of the material choices are, it works and works well - check Sharon Rice's 'Too Close to Home' with keyboard and saxophone solos, but it's Coe's voice that carries the day. This is not the best place for the curious to begin with DAC, but for those who are die-hard fans, this is an essential recording".

== Track listing ==
1. "She Used to Love Me a Lot" (R.K. Fleming/D. Morgan/C. Quillen)
2. "You're the Only Song I Sing Today" (M. Brantley/B. Rabin)
3. "Too Close to Home" (Sharon Rice)
4. "My Elusive Dreams" (Curly Putman/Billy Sherrill)
5. "Mary Go Round (About the Birth of Jesus)" (David Allan Coe)
6. "Don't Cry Darlin' (with George Jones) (Dean Dillon)
7. "She Ain't You"
8. "My Girl" (Smokey Robinson/Ronald White)
9. "Call Me the Breeze" (J.J. Cale)
10. "For Lovers Only" (Coe)

== Personnel ==
- Vocals – David Allan Coe
- Backing vocals: Doug Clements, Hurshel Wiginton, James Ferguson, Lori Westerman Brooks, Louis Nunley, Martha Adcock, Wendy Suits
- Steel guitar – Pete Drake
- Keyboards – Bobby Wood, Hargus Robbins, Steve Davidowski
- Harmonica – Steve McMillan
- Guitar – David Allan Coe, Dale Sellers, Billy Sanford, Martha Adcock, Pete Bordonali, Edward Adcock
- Drums – Buddy Harmon, Jerry Carrigan, Jerry Kroon
- Bass guitar – Harry Strzelecki, Michael Leech
- Strings – The "A" Strings
- Musician – Ron Reynolds
