= Deep Thoughts from a Shallow Mind =

Studio album by Doug Supernaw
- Released: September 13, 1994
- Recorded: Loud Recording Studio, Nashville
- Genre: Country
- Length: 36:44
- Label: BNA
- Producer: Richard Landis

Doug Supernaw chronology
| Red and Rio Grande (1993) | Deep Thoughts from a Shallow Mind (1994) | You Still Got Me (1995) |

Deep Thoughts from a Shallow Mind is the second studio album by American country music artist Doug Supernaw. It was released on September 13, 1994, by BNA Records and it produced the singles "What'll You Do About Me", You Never Even Call Me by My Name (a cover of the Steve Goodman-John Prine song), and "State Fair". "What'll You Do About Me" was previously a #76 single in 1984 for Steve Earle, and a #74 single in 1992 for The Forester Sisters.

Alanna Nash of Entertainment Weekly gave the album a C+ rating, saying that it lacked the sense of humor of Supernaw's debut.

== Track listing ==
| No. | Title | Writer(s) | Length |
|---|---|---|---|
| 1. | "What'll You Do About Me" | Dennis Linde | 2:41 |
| 2. | "Here's to Lying" | Doug Supernaw; Justin White; Allen Huff; Don Crider; Kenny King | 3:09 |
| 3. | "You Never Even Call Me by My Name" (featuring David Allan Coe, Charley Pride, Waylon Jennings and Merle Haggard) | Steve Goodman; John Prine | 4:04 |
| 4. | "State Fair" | Mickey Cates | 3:39 |
| 5. | "Twistin' Tops" | Supernaw; Rick Robertson | 3:57 |
| 6. | "Mesquite Cowboy Mind" | Supernaw; Justin White | 3:37 |
| 7. | "He Went to Paris" | Jimmy Buffett | 3:37 |
| 8. | "Shut'er Down" | Supernaw; White | 4:10 |
| 9. | "After the Storm" | Supernaw; Huff; White | 3:54 |
| 10. | "Wishin' Her Well" | Supernaw; White | 3:39 |
| Total length: | | | 36:44 |

== Personnel ==
Listed in liner notes.

- David Allan Coe − vocals on "You Never Even Call Me by My Name"
- Eddie Bayers − drums
- Michael Black − background vocals
- Larry Byrom − acoustic guitar
- Glen Duncan − fiddle
- Paul Franklin – steel guitar
- Merle Haggard − vocals on "You Never Even Call Me by My Name"
- David Hungate − bass guitar
- Waylon Jennings − vocals on "You Never Even Call Me by My Name"
- Carl Marsh – keyboards
- Steve Nathan – organ, synthesizer
- Charley Pride – vocals on "You Never Even Call Me by My Name"
- Matt Rollings – piano
- Doug Supernaw – lead vocals, background vocals
- Billy Joe Walker, Jr. – acoustic guitar, electric guitar
- Dennis Wilson – background vocals
- Curtis "Mr. Harmony" Young – background vocals

== Chart performance ==
=== Album ===
| Chart (1994) | Peak position |
|---|---|
| U.S. Billboard Top Country Albums | 48 |
| U.S. Billboard Top Heatseekers | 19 |

=== Singles ===
| Year | Single | Peak positions | |
| Year | Single | US Country | CAN Country |
|---|---|---|---|
| 1994 | "State Fair" | 55 | — |
| 1994 | "You Never Even Call Me by My Name" | 60 | 68 |
| 1995 | "What'll You Do About Me" | 16 | 26 |
