= Red and Rio Grande =

Studio album by Doug Supernaw
- Released: April 27, 1993
- Recorded: 1992–93
- Genre: Country
- Length: 34:03
- Label: BNA
- Producer: Richard Landis

Doug Supernaw chronology
Red and Rio Grande (1993)	Deep Thoughts from a Shallow Mind (1994)

Red and Rio Grande is the debut studio album by American country music artist Doug Supernaw. It was released on April 27, 1993, via BNA Records. It produced four singles for Supernaw on the Billboard Hot Country Songs charts, the highest being "I Don't Call Him Daddy" (previously recorded by Kenny Rogers on his album I Prefer the Moonlight) at No. 1.

== Critical reception ==
Professional ratings
Review scores
Source	Rating
AllMusic	4.5/5 stars

Michael McCall of AllMusic cited "I Don't Call Him Daddy" as an "anthem" for divorced fathers. Joseph Stanley of Cash Box called it a "solid, well made album", highlighting the first five songs in particular.

== Track listing ==
No.	Title	Writer(s)	Length
1.	"Honky Tonkin' Fool"	Aaron Barker	3:16
2.	"I Don't Call Him Daddy"	Reed Nielsen	3:47
3.	"Reno"	Doug Supernaw; Tim Buckley; Joe Deleon; Kenny King; Allen Huff; Justin White; Don Crider	3:33
4.	"The Perfect Picture (To Fit My Frame of Mind)"	Bucky Jones; Bob McDill	3:23
5.	"Five Generations of Rock County Wilsons"	John Scott Sherrill	3:45
6.	"Red and Rio Grande"	Supernaw; Lonnie Atkinson	4:00
7.	"You're Gonna Bring Back Cheatin' Songs"	Tom Shapiro; Chris Waters	3:10
8.	"I Would Have Loved You All Night Long"	Glenn Martin	3:20
9.	"Daddy's Girl"	Supernaw; Rick Robertson	3:21
10.	"Carousel"	Supernaw	2:48
Total length:			34:03

== Personnel ==
- Doug Supernaw: Lead Vocals
- Michael Black, Harry Stinson, Doug Supernaw, Mervyn Warren, Chris Willis, Dennis Wilson, Curtis Young: Background Vocals
- Larry Byrom, Billy Joe Walker, Jr.: Acoustic Guitar
- Steve Gibson, Larry Byrom, Billy Joe Walker Jr.: Electric guitar
- Sonny Garrish: Pedal Steel Guitar
- Glen Duncan: Fiddle
- Terry McMillan: Harmonica
- Mitch Humphries: Piano
- Mitch Humphries, Carl Marsh: Keyboards
- David Hungate: Bass guitar
- Eddie Bayers: Drums

== Production ==
- Produced By Richard Landis
- Engineered By Chuck Ainlay & Csaba Petocz, with assistance by Todd Culross & Craig White
- Mixed By Chuck Ainlay & Graham Lewis
- Mastered By Glenn Meadows

== Chart performance ==
=== Album ===
Chart (1993)	Peak position
U.S. Billboard Top Country Albums	27
U.S. Billboard 200	147
U.S. Billboard Top Heatseekers	3
Canadian RPM Country Albums	18

=== Singles ===
Year	Single	Peak positions	
Year	Single	US Country	CAN Country
1993	"Honky Tonkin' Fool"	50	—
1993	"Reno"	4	12
1993	"I Don't Call Him Daddy"	1	27
1994	"Red and Rio Grande"	23	28
