= State Fair (song) =

Single by Doug Supernaw

from the album Deep Thoughts from a Shallow Mind
- B-side: "You Never Even Called Me by My Name"
- Released: August 1994
- Genre: Country
- Length: 3:39
- Label: BNA
- Songwriter: Mickey Cates
- Producer: Richard Landis

Doug Supernaw singles chronology
"Red and Rio Grande" (1993)	"State Fair" (1994)	"You Never Even Called Me by My Name" (1994)

"State Fair" is a song recorded by American country music artist Doug Supernaw. It was released in August 1994 as the first single from his album Deep Thoughts from a Shallow Mind. It peaked at number 55 in the United States.

== Content ==
"State Fair" is a mid-tempo ballad. The narrator reminisces about an event in 1973, where he and his second cousin Calvin are heading to the state fair. On the way, they get involved in a head-on drunk-driving collision that claimed Calvin's life. The narrator survives and explains his guilt over the crash years later and talks about how he remembers his final moments with Calvin on the road trip, reaching underneath the dash and pulling out a pack of cigarettes he kept stashed.

== Controversy ==
The song caused controversy by MADD advocates due to its portrayal of underage drinking, after a couple scenes in the video show two teenagers standing outside a convenience store getting an adult to purchase alcohol for them and one of the teenagers throwing an empty beer can into a farmer's field.

Supernaw stated the video was never intended to glorify underage drinking, rather use the song's video as a message to talk about the consequences of it.

== Music video ==
The music video was directed by Sherman Halsey.

The video tells the story of the narrator and his second cousin, Calvin as teenagers in 1973. Calvin picks him up at his home and they stop at a convenience store where they ask an older man to purchase beer for them. The man does and they part ways. The teens stop and drink the beers and smoke cigarettes in a farmer's field. The pair then were in an off-camera head-on collision in which the narrator survives.

The video flashes forward to the present day, where Supernaw and his friends are stopped at a service station on the way to a Houston Astros game. On the way inside, Supernaw sees two teenagers standing outside the store, he goes to approach them before reconsidering and walking into the store ignoring them.

The video shows Supernaw at a state fair singing on the midway in between story clips. The video was shot partially in black and white, with some scenes shot in color.
