= Just Divorced =

Studio album by David Allan Coe
- Released: 1984
- Studios: Eleven Eleven Studio, Nashville
- Genre: Country
- Label: Columbia
- Producer: Billy Sherrill

David Allan Coe chronology
Hello in There (1983)	Just Divorced (1984)	Darlin', Darlin (1985)

Just Divorced is an album by country musician David Allan Coe, released in 1984 on Columbia Records.

== Recording ==
Just Divorced contains Coe's biggest chart hit, "Mona Lisa Lost Her Smile," which rose to #2 on the country singles chart in early 1984. In Canada, it reached Number One on the RPM Country Tracks charts dated for June 30, 1984. The song is a mid-tempo ballad about a young blonde girl, featuring allusions to the iconic Da Vinci painting. The song features one of producer Billy Sherrill's most elaborate productions, with AllMusic's Thom Jurek commenting, "The layered strings and organ work are slick, but they add such warmth and depth in contrast to Coe's voice that it works to devastating effect."

As was his habit occasionally, Coe gave each side of the LP a theme, with side one being the Down Side and side two being the Up Side. Ever the prolific songwriter, Coe wrote six of the ten songs on the LP, which was his fifth release of new material for Columbia in three years, including the third in a series of songs called "For Lovers, Pt. 3." This version is the most eclectic of the four, featuring the same Tom Waits-like piano bar introduction found in the first two instalments, before giving way to a saxophone-drenched R&B section, which fades into a just over a minute of unaccompanied banjo diddling. In keeping with the theme, the songs on Down Side are grim weepers, like "He's Taking It Hard (She's Taking It Easy)," which explores the contrasting worlds in the aftermath of a failed relationship, and the western swing-tinged "Thief in My Bedroom." The folksy "Sweet Angeline" is a plea from a father to his daughter on the cusp of womanhood not to "let anybody get inside your mind until you get too blind to see."

The Up Side of the record kicks off with the ironic title track, which tells the story of a recently divorced man (a subject Coe knew very well) who scrawls "Just Divorced" on the window of his car, rather than "Just Married" associated with weddings, and attaches beer can paper streamers to the back. (The imagery from the tune was used for the album's cover.) About halfway through, the song briefly breaks into the hook from Vern Gosdin's "If You're Gonna Do Me Wrong (Do It Right)," which hit #5 the previous year. Similarly, "It's Great to Be Single Again" is a light-hearted celebration of singlehood that Sherrill adorns in New Orleans Dixie brass. Coe ends the album with Jerry Butler's "For Your Precious Love," which is carried off convincingly as a country song - complete with first-person confessional as an intro. Coe covered Butler's "He Will Break Your Heart" on his previous album Hello in There, released earlier in the year.

== Reception ==
The album rose to #23 on the country albums chart. "It's Great to Be Single Again" was released as a follow-up to the hit "Mona Lisa Lost Her Smile" and peaked at #44.

== Track listing ==
All songs written by David Allan Coe except as indicated.

1. "Mona Lisa Lost Her Smile" (Johnny Cunningham)
2. "Sweet Angeline"
3. "He's Taking It Hard (She's Taking It Easy)"
4. "For Lovers Only, Pt. 3"
5. "Thief in My Bedroom"
6. "Just Divorced"
7. "It's Great to Be Single Again"
8. "Blue Grass Morning" (D. Darst/G. Gentry/M. Sherrill/R. Rivers)
9. "I Wanta Know I'm Going Home" (Buzz Rabin)
10. "For Your Precious Love" (A. Brooks/J. Butler/R. Brooks)

== Personnel ==
- David Allan Coe – vocals, guitar, vibraphone
- Pete Drake – steel guitar
- Warren Haynes – guitar
- Billy Sanford – guitar
- Hargus "Pig" Robbins – piano
- Henry Strzelecki – bass
- Bobby Wood – electric piano
- Eddie Adcock – guitar, banjo
- John McEuen – mandolin, banjo
- The Nashville Edition – backing vocals
- Terry McMillan – harmonica
- Jeff Hale & Kenny Malone – drums
- Pete Bordonalli – guitar
- Dennis Solee & Roger Bissell – horns
