= Encore Data Products =

American audio equipment manufacturer

Encore Data Products Inc.
- Company type: Private
- Industry: Commerce
- Founded: 2006
- Founder: Jeff Burgess
- Headquarters: Lafayette, Colorado
- Products: Headphones, Headsets, Audio Visual Accessories
- Website: Official website

Encore Data Products is a privately held American supplier of audio accessories and supplies including headphones, amplifiers. The company was founded in 2006 and currently headquartered in Lafayette, Colorado. It is one of the largest manufacturers and supplier of audio and video components in Colorado.

== Overview ==
Encore Data Products was founded in 2006 and is currently headquartered in Lafayette, Colorado. The company target markets are K-12 education, health and fitness, hospitality, business and government industries. Encore Data Products is also the sole distributor of the Soundnetic brand of headphones, headsets and earbuds. The company's products enable schools to incorporate audiovisual resources into their lessons, helping students build speaking and listening skills. Certain headphone and headset requirements need to be met for school district and state testing criteria in the United States.
