= EnCore Processor =

Microprocessor family

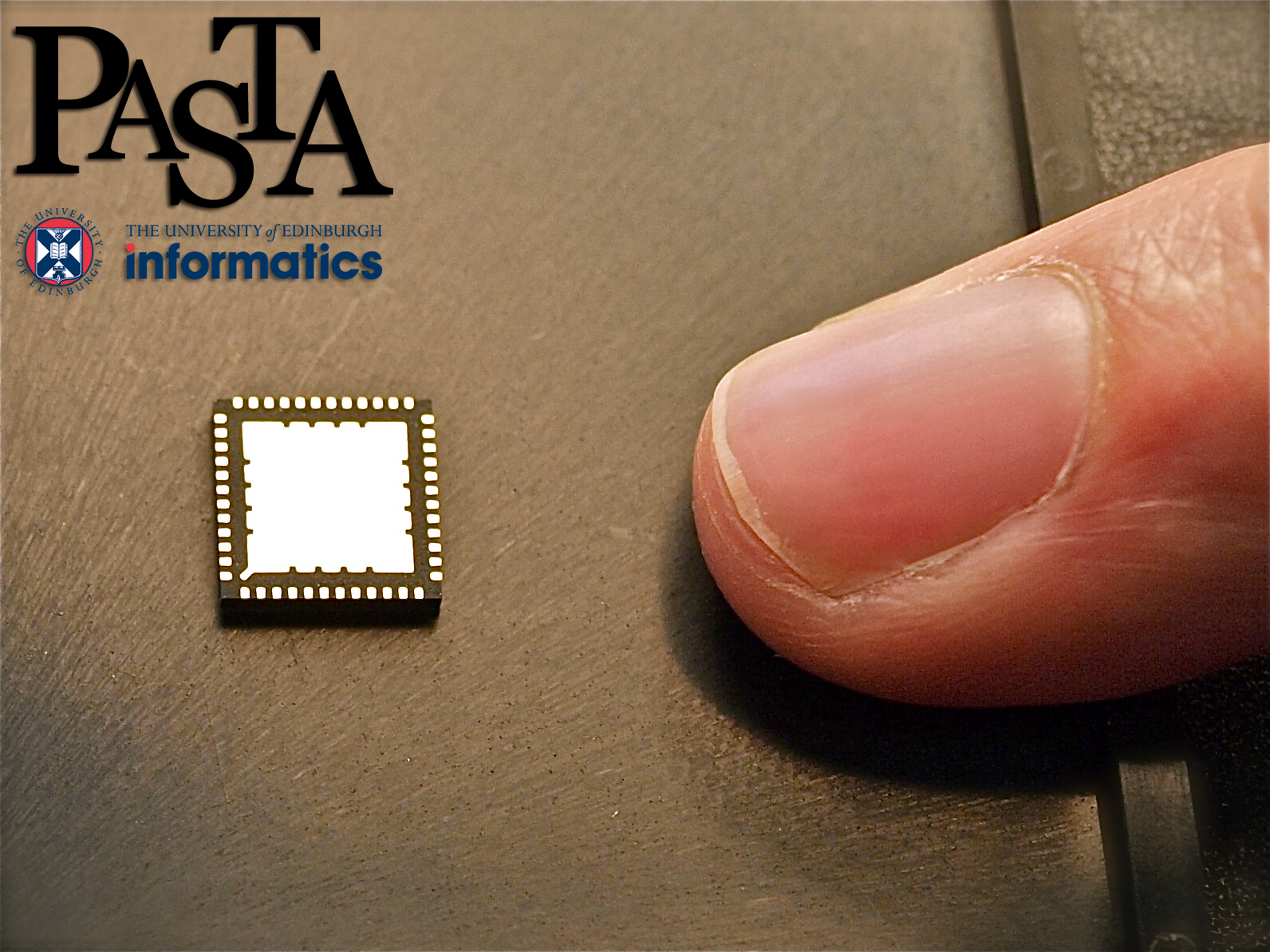
EnCore Calton vs. Small Finger

The EnCore microprocessor family is a configurable and extendable implementation of a compact 32-bit RISC instruction set architecture - developed by the PASTA Research Group at the University of Edinburgh School of Informatics. The following are key features of the EnCore microprocessor family:

- 5 stage pipeline
- highest operating frequency in its class
- lowest possible dynamic energy consumption - 99% of flip-flops automatically clock-gated using typical synthesis tools
- most non-memory operations achieving single-cycle latency, and no more than one load-delay slot
- easy configurability of cache architectures
- compact baseline instruction set architecture (ISA), including freely-mixed 16-bit and 32-bit encodings for maximum code density
- no overhead for switching between 16- and 32-bit instruction encodings

All of the EnCore test chips are named after hills in Edinburgh; Calton, being the smallest, is the first of these. The second, Castle, is named after the rock on which Edinburgh Castle is built.

== EnCore Calton ==
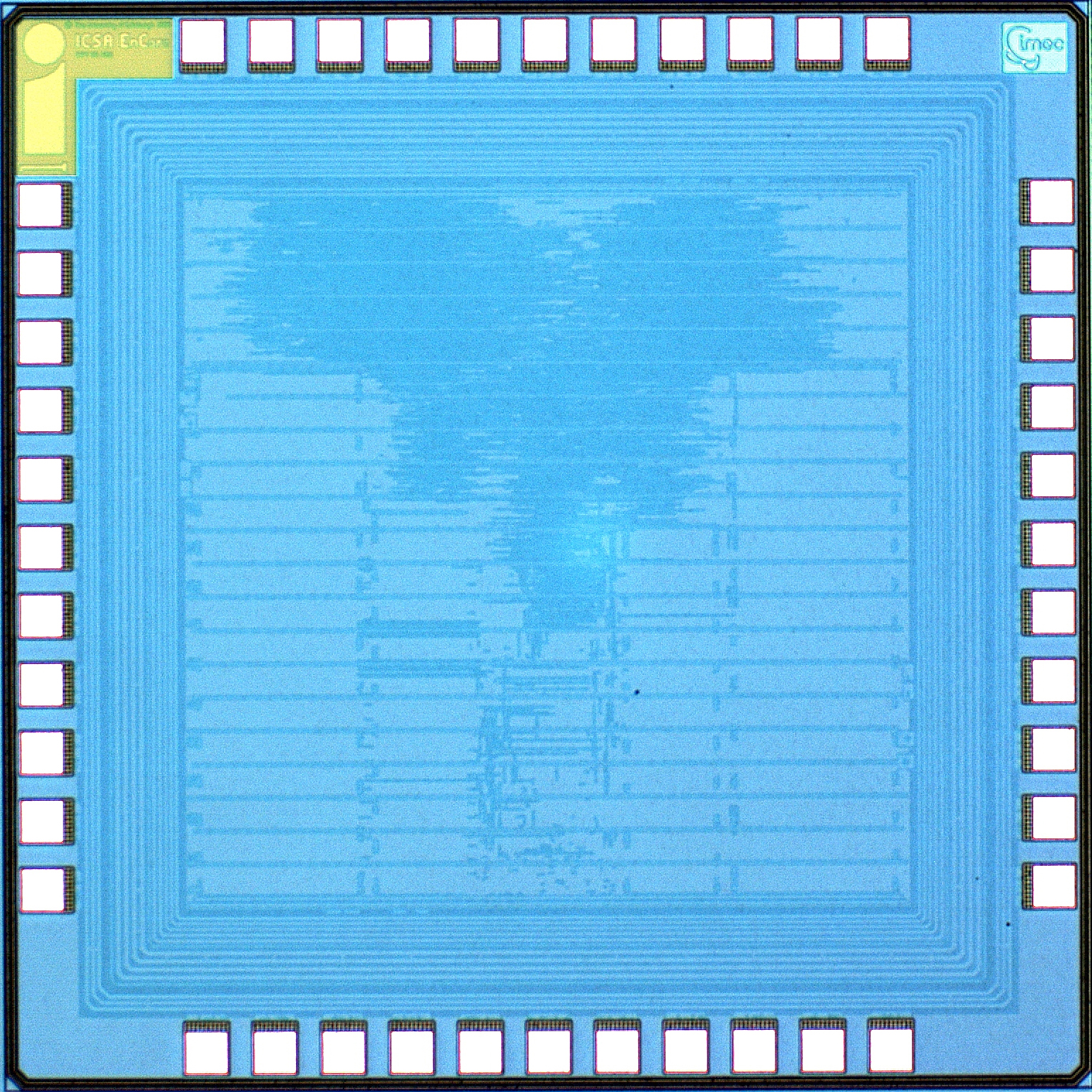
Photomicrograph picture of EnCore Calton

The first silicon implementation of the EnCore processor is a test-chip code-named Calton, fabricated in a generic 130nm CMOS process using a standard ASIC flow.

- 130nm implementation of EnCore processor in baseline configuration extended with barrel shifter, multiplier, and a full set of 32 general purpose registers.
- Contains bus interface and system control functions, in addition to the processor.
- Implemented with 8KB direct-mapped instruction- and data-cache.
- Complete system-on-chip occupies 1 mm^{2} of silicon at 75% utilization.
- Chip-level power consumption is 25 mW at 250 MHz.
- First silicon samples operate above a frequency of 375 MHz at typical voltage and temperature.

== EnCore Castle ==
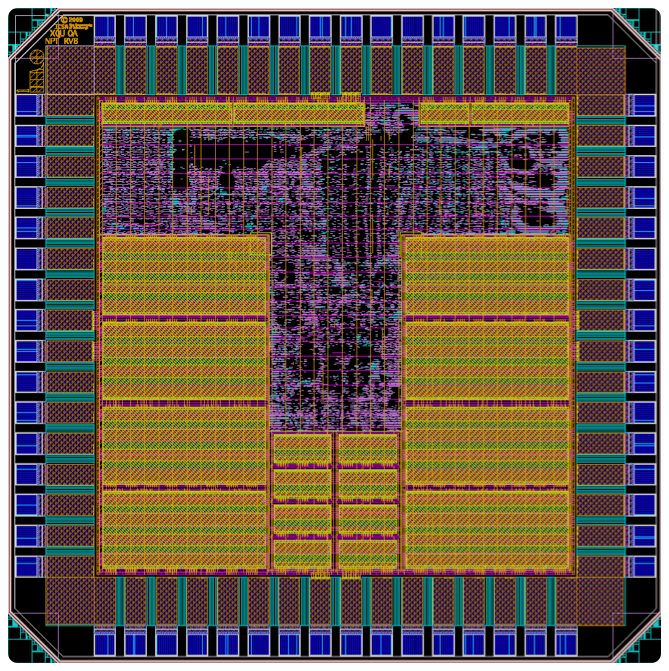
Chip Layout of EnCore Castle

The second silicon implementation of an extended EnCore processor is a test-chip codenamed Castle, fabricated in a generic 90nm CMOS process.

The Castle chip contains an extended version of the EnCore processor, together with a 32KB 4-way set-associative Instruction Cache, and a 32KB 4-way set-associative Data Cache. It is embedded within a system-on-chip (SoC) design that provides a generic 32-bit memory interface, as well as interrupt, clocks and reset signals.

- 90nm implementation is based on a generic free foundry libraries, and a stack of 9 metal layers.
- Complete design occupies 2.25 sq.mm on a 1.875 x 1.875 mm die. This includes the baseline CPU, the reconfigurable Configurable Flow Accelerator (CFA) extension logic, two 32KB caches, and the off-chip interfaces.
- Designed to operate on a core voltage of 0.9V to 1.1V, with 2.5V LVCMOS I/O signals.
- Packaged in a 68-pin Ceramic LCC.
- First silicon samples operate at 600MHz.
- Chip-level power consumption is 70mW at 600 MHz, under typical conditions.
- Complete design flow, from RTL to GDSII, was performed by the PASTA team. This was based on an in-house developed design flow using Synopsys Design Compiler for topological synthesis, and IC Compiler for automated place-and-route.
- Over 97% of all flip-flops in the design were automatically clock-gated during logic synthesis.
- LVS and DRC checks were performed using Calibre, from Mentor Graphics.
