= Encore (TV series) =

- Genre: Drama
- Country of origin: Canada
- Original language: English
- No. of seasons: 1

Production
- Running time: 50–60 minutes

Original release
- Network: CBC Television
- Release: 26 June – 25 September 1960

Encore is a Canadian drama anthology television series that aired on CBC Television in 1960.

== Premise ==
This was a series of dramas broadcast previously on such anthologies as Folio, General Motors Presents and Showtime.

== Scheduling ==
This 50-minute series (except for the debut's full hour time slot) was broadcast Sundays at 9:00 p.m. (Eastern) from 26 June to 25 September 1960.

=== Presenting Barry Morse ===
After Encore, the remaining 10 minutes of the time slot to 10:00 p.m. featured Presenting Barry Morse in which the actor discussed dramatic literature and history and provided readings of dramatic works.

== Episodes ==
1. A Phoenix Too Frequent (1958; Paul Almond producer; Christopher Fry writer), starring Rosemary Harris and Don Harron
2. The Last of the Hot Pilots (Andy Lewis writer), starring Alan Young
3. The Desperate Search (Harvey Hart producer; Len Peterson writer), starring Janine Sutto
4. The Oddball (Melwyn Breen producer; Bernard Slade writer), starring Corinne Conley and Tom Harvey
5. Love Story 1910 (Basil Coleman producer; Leslie MacFarlane writer), starring Eric House, Frances Hyland, Barry Morse and Tony Van Bridge
6. How to Make More Money than Men (Norman Campbell producer; Bernard Slade writer), starring Corinne Conley and Tom Harvey
7. The New Men (Ronald Weyman producer; C. P. Snow writer; Jacqueline Rosenfeld adaptation), starring John Colicos, Don Harron and Barry Morse
8. Murder Story (Leo Orenstein producer; Ludovic Kennedy writer; Leslie Duncan adaptation), starring Eric Christmas, Barry Morse and Jeremy Wilkin
9. Mr. Arcularis (Harvey Hart producer; Conrad Aiken writer; Robert Herridge adaptation), starring John Drainie and Lois Nettleton
10. Here Today (Melwyn Breen producer; Andy Lewis writer), starring Robert Goulet and Kate Reid
11. Sun in My Eyes (Harvey Hart producer; written by Jack Kuper), starring Toby Robins and Al Waxman
12. The Giaconda Smile (Eric Till producer; Aldous Huxley writer; Rita Greer Allen adaptation), starring Pamela Brown, Dawn Greenhalgh, Barry Morse and Tony Van Bridge
13. Race For Heaven (Melwyn Breen producer; David Swift writer), starring Hugh Webster and Chris Wiggins
14. The Beckoning Hill (Paul Almond producer; Arthur Murphy writer), starring Michael Craig
