= Encore HSC =

The Encore Concert refers to a musical concert held in the Sydney Opera House every year. Performers of the Encore Concert are year 12 students of the previous year who have finished the Higher School Certificate in New South Wales/Australian Capital Territory, studied either Music 1, Music 2 and/or Music Extension and have achieved outstanding results in instrumental performance or music composition.

Every year a selection of students will be nominated to perform in the Encore Concert. Nominees will be asked to record a video of their performance or composition and are handed to the Board of Studies for further selection. Approximately 20 performers (Year 2005) in the state will be selected to perform. The Board of Studies will also produce CD recordings of the live performance and are available for sale.
