= Doug Supernaw =

American country music singer (1960–2020)

- Supernaw in a promotional photo

Background information
- Born: Douglas Anderson Supernaw; September 26, 1960; Bryan, Texas, U.S.
- Died: November 13, 2020 (aged 60) Livingston, Texas, U.S.
- Genres: Country
- Occupations: Singer, songwriter
- Instruments: Vocals, guitar
- Years active: 1993–1999; 2016–2020
- Labels: BNA; Giant; Tack; B&G
- Website: dougsupernaw.com

Douglas Anderson Supernaw (September 26, 1960 – November 13, 2020) was an American country music artist. After several years performing as a local musician throughout the state of Texas, he signed with BNA Records in 1993.

Supernaw released four studio albums in his career: Red and Rio Grande (1993), Deep Thoughts from a Shallow Mind (1994), You Still Got Me (1995), and Fadin' Renegade (1999). Between 1993 and 1996, he charted 11 singles on the Billboard Hot Country Singles & Tracks (now Hot Country Songs) charts, including "I Don't Call Him Daddy", his only No. 1 single, in late 1993.

== Biography ==
Douglas Anderson Supernaw was born on September 26, 1960, in Bryan, Texas. He grew up in Inwood Forest and was an avid golfer as well as a member of his high school golf team. His mother, a fan of country music, exposed Supernaw to acts such as George Jones and Gene Watson, by whose works he would later be influenced.

Supernaw attended college on a golfing scholarship. After dropping out of college in 1979, he briefly worked on an oil rig before serving as a musician in local bands. Supernaw moved to Nashville, Tennessee in 1987, where he found work as a session songwriter. After four years in Nashville, Supernaw moved back to Texas, where he founded a band called Texas Steel.

=== 1993–1995: BNA Records ===
An A&R executive for RCA Records discovered Supernaw and signed him to the label's BNA Entertainment (now BNA Records) division in 1993. That year, Supernaw released his debut album, Red and Rio Grande. From the album, four singles were released, starting with "Honky Tonkin' Fool", which did not enter the Top 40 on the Billboard country music charts. "Reno", the second single, reached the Top 5 soon afterward, while its follow-up, "I Don't Call Him Daddy" (previously a No. 86 single in 1988 for Kenny Rogers), became Supernaw's only Number One single by the end of the year. The album went on to achieve gold certification in the United States.

A series of injuries nearly ended Supernaw's career after his first album's release. After recovering from a broken neck suffered while surfing, he was involved in a head-on car collision. Finally, he was hospitalized after a nearly-fatal case of food poisoning. Once he had recovered from the food poisoning, he recorded his second album for BNA, 1994's Deep Thoughts from a Shallow Mind. Of the album's three singles, only the Dennis Linde-penned "What'll You Do About Me" (previously a single in 1984 for Steve Earle, and in 1992 for the Forester Sisters, and recorded by Randy Travis on his 1987 album Always & Forever) entered the Top 40 on the country music charts. Shortly after the second album's release, he exited BNA's roster.

Also in 1994, Supernaw was nominated for Top New Male Vocalist and Song of the Year by the Academy of Country Music but lost in both categories to John Michael Montgomery.

=== 1995–1997: Giant / Sony BMG Records ===
In 1995, he was signed to Giant Records, where he recorded and released his third major-label album, You Still Got Me, in 1996. Although its first single, "Not Enough Hours in the Night", reached a peak of No. 3 on the country singles charts, neither of the album's other singles reached the Top 40, and he left Giant Records not long afterward. He also made an appearance on Stars and Stripes Vol. 1, a 1996 compilation album issued by the Beach Boys. It featured the band performing their own songs along with other country music artists; Supernaw contributed to the track "Long Tall Texan". His first compilation album, entitled The Encore Collection, was issued by Sony BMG Special Products in 1997.

=== 1999: Tack Records ===
Supernaw's third recording contract was with the small, independent Tack label, on which he released Fadin' Renegade on August 31, 1999. The album's two singles, the title track and "21–17", did not enter the country music charts.

=== 2016–2020: B&G Records ===
Supernaw returned to music in 2016 in local venues in his home state of Texas. Also returning to the recording studio in 2017 on the independent B&G Records label, Supernaw re-recorded his hits as Greatest Hits, which was released on April 1, 2017. The album included two new songs: "Here's My Heart" and "The Company I Keep".

== Personal life and death ==
Supernaw's son, Phillip, was a tight end in the NFL.

On February 4, 2019, Supernaw announced that he had been diagnosed with stage IV lung and bladder cancer. Supernaw died at his home on November 13, 2020, at age 60.

== Discography ==
=== Studio albums ===
Title	Album details	Peak chart positions				Certifications (sales threshold)
Title	Album details	US Country	US	US Heat	CAN Country	Certifications (sales threshold)
Red and Rio Grande	Release date: April 27, 1993; Label: BNA Records; Formats: CD, cassette	27	147	3	18	US: Gold
Deep Thoughts from a Shallow Mind	Release date: September 13, 1994; Label: BNA Records; Formats: CD, cassette	48	—	19	—	
You Still Got Me	Release date: October 24, 1995; Label: Giant Nashville; Formats: CD, cassette	42	—	19	31	
Fadin' Renegade	Release date: August 31, 1999; Label: Tack Records; Formats: CD, cassette	—	—	—	—	
"—" denotes releases that did not chart

=== Singles ===
Year	Single	Peak chart positions		Album
Year	Single	US Country	CAN Country	Album
1993	"Honky Tonkin' Fool"	50	—	Red and Rio Grande
1993	"Reno"	4	12	Red and Rio Grande
1993	"I Don't Call Him Daddy"	1	27	Red and Rio Grande
1994	"Red and Rio Grande"	23	28	Red and Rio Grande
1994	"State Fair"	55	—	Deep Thoughts from a Shallow Mind
1994	"You Never Even Called Me by My Name"	60	68	Deep Thoughts from a Shallow Mind
1995	"What'll You Do About Me"	16	26	Deep Thoughts from a Shallow Mind
1995	"Not Enough Hours in the Night"	3	4	You Still Got Me
1996	"She Never Looks Back"	51	—	You Still Got Me
1996	"You Still Got Me"	53	69	You Still Got Me
1999	"21 to 17"	—	—	Fadin' Renegade
"—" denotes releases that did not chart

=== Other charted songs ===
Year	Single	Peak chart positions		Album
Year	Single	US Country	CAN Country	Album
1996	"Long Tall Texan" (The Beach Boys featuring Doug Supernaw)	69	82	Stars and Stripes Vol. 1

=== Music videos ===
Year	Video	Director
1993	"Honky Tonkin' Fool"	Richard Jernigan
1993	"Reno"	Sherman Halsey
1993	"I Don't Call Him Daddy"	Sherman Halsey
1994	"State Fair"	Sherman Halsey
1995	"Not Enough Hours in the Night"	Steven T. Miller/R. Brad Murano
1996	"She Never Looks Back"	Doug Supernaw
1996	"Long Tall Texan" (featuring the Beach Boys)	Sara Nichols
1996	"Four Scores and Seven Beers Ago" (featuring Herschel Walker)	—N/a
1999	"21 to 17"	—N/a

== Awards and nominations ==
Year	Organization	Award	Nominee/Work	Result
1994	Academy of Country Music Awards	Top New Male Vocalist	Doug Supernaw	Nominated
1994	Academy of Country Music Awards	Song of the Year	"I Don't Call Him Daddy"	Nominated
1994	TNN/Music City News Country Awards	Video of the Year	"I Don't Call Him Daddy"	Nominated
1997	Academy of Country Music Awards	Video of the Year	"She Never Looks Back"	Nominated
