= Castles in the Sand =

Studio album by David Allan Coe
- Released: 1983
- Recorded: Eleven Eleven Studio
- Genre: Country
- Label: Columbia
- Producer: Billy Sherrill

David Allan Coe chronology
Underground Album (1982)	Castles in the Sand (1983)	Hello in There (1983)

Castles in the Sand is an album released by country musician David Allan Coe. It was released in 1983 on Columbia.

== Recording ==
Castles in the Sand would be a huge comeback for Coe, peaking at #8 on the country albums chart, his highest showing since Once Upon a Rhyme hit the same mark eight years earlier. Its success was spurred on by "The Ride," which was released in February 1983 as the lead single from the album and spent 19 weeks on the Billboard country singles charts, reaching a peak of #4 and hitting #2 on the Canadian RPM Country Tracks chart. The ballad tells the first-person story of a hitchhiker's encounter with the ghost of Hank Williams in a ride from Montgomery, Alabama to Nashville, Tennessee. The mysterious driver, "dressed like 1950, half drunk and hollow-eyed", questions the narrator whether he has the musical talent and dedication to become a star in the country music industry. The song's lyrics place the events on U.S. Route 31 or the largely parallel Interstate 65. Buoyed by the single, Castles in the Sand became the mainstream breakthrough Coe and producer Billy Sherrill had been trying for since the decade began. A second single, the bawdy "Cheap Thrills," was released as a second single and nearly made the country Top 40, peaking at #45. The title track is a tribute to Bob Dylan, with Coe affecting Dylan's half-baked beat poet drawl from the Blonde on Blonde era and disparaging the obsessive fans and critics "searching through your lyric sheets for hidden meanings..." This is followed by a cover of Dylan's "Gotta Serve Somebody," sung with Lacy J. Dalton and rocked up considerably compared to the R&B original recorded at Muscle Shoals. Castles in the Sand contains two more duets: "Fool Inside of Me" with Diane Sherrill and the romantic "Don't Be a Stranger" with Eve Shapiro, which is augmented with a saxophone.

One of the most impressive songs Coe ever wrote is "Missin' the Kid," which finds a father lamenting the loss of his daughter, who now lives with his estranged ex-wife. Over a languid beat and using simple language, Coe delivers a stunning vocal that expresses with weary resignation the bitterness, guilt, and extreme sadness that comes with a broken family. Beginning with the line, "I still can't believe after all of these years I still miss you," the narrator wonders what his wife will tell their daughter when she asks about him, and finally declares:

I tell myself that it's best if I don't try to see her
Seeing her now could not make up for all she's been through
Watching two people she once called her mother and father
Acting like strangers, that's something I could not do

In his AllMusic review of the album, writer Thom Jurek writes:

"Missin' the Kid" is a self-penned waltz that is sad and haunted, full of regret and remorse over the loss of his daughter when his second marriage broke up, something he never got over. It's also one of the most sensitive things he's ever written, as it is full of empathy for a daughter he hasn't seen in over ten years.

"Son of a Rebel Son" is similar to Coe's earlier composition "I Still Sing the Old Songs" in that it recalls three generations, including a grandfather who "was a rebel back in '61" and who "fought for freedom but never won." The album concludes with the first of what will be a four-part series of songs: "For Lovers, Pt. 1." It begins like a Tom Waits ballad as Coe begins to sing from a barstool, offering a portrayal of himself trying to write the song in some gin mill and asking an imaginary waitress for a Jack Daniels and water, and a pencil with an eraser on it before stumbling, flubbing, and finding his way through a fond wish for those who dare to love not to give up, no matter how rough the breaks can be.

== Reception ==
AllMusic: "Castles in the Sand is one of David Allan Coe's most underrated and consistent. Coming well after his glory - and scandal - years in the 1970s, Coe and producer Billy Sherrill integrated their partnership into a seamless whole."

== Track listing ==
All songs written by David Allan Coe except as indicated.

1. "Cheap Thrills" (Bob McDill)
2. "Son of a Rebel Son"
3. "Fool Inside of Me" (with Diane Sherrill)
4. "Castles in the Sand"
5. "Gotta Serve Somebody" (with Lacy J. Dalton) (Bob Dylan)
6. "The Ride" (Gary Gentry/John Blayne Detterline, Jr.)
7. "I Can't Let You Be a Memory" (Warren Haynes)
8. "Missin' the Kid"
9. "Don't Be a Stranger" (with Eve Shapiro) (Karen Brooks/Coe)
10. "For Lovers Only, Pt. 1"
