= I Don't Call Him Daddy =

Single by Doug Supernaw

from the album Red and Rio Grande
- B-side: "I Would Have Loved You All Night Long"
- Released: October 2, 1993
- Recorded: 1992–1993
- Genre: Country
- Length: 3:47
- Label: BNA
- Songwriter: Reed Nielsen
- Producer: Richard Landis

Doug Supernaw singles chronology
"Reno" (1993)	"I Don't Call Him Daddy" (1993)	"Red and Rio Grande" (1994)

Music video
- "I Don't Call Him Daddy" on YouTube

"I Don't Call Him Daddy" is a song written by American songwriter Reed Nielsen. It was initially recorded by Kenny Rogers on his 1987 album I Prefer the Moonlight, and was released in October 1993 by Doug Supernaw as the third single from his debut album Red and Rio Grande. Supernaw's version was his only number-one single on the Billboard Hot Country Songs charts, peaking there in December 1993.

== Content ==
"I Don't Call Him Daddy" takes the point of view of a divorced father whose ex-wife now has a live-in boyfriend. In the first verse, the divorced father phones his son, and the son in the chorus mentions that he could only call his biological father "daddy" and nobody else.

== Music video ==
A music video was released in late 1993, and was directed and produced by Sherman Halsey. Supernaw's son, Phillip, who grew up to become a professional American football player, appears in the video.

== Recording history ==
The first version of the song was recorded by Kenny Rogers on his 1987 album I Prefer the Moonlight. Released in 1988 in support of the "Greatest Hits" album, it peaked at #86 on the Billboard country singles charts that year. Doug Supernaw covered it in 1993 on his debut album Red and Rio Grande, and issued it late that year as his third single. It was his second Top 40 country hit, and his only Number One.

== Critical reception ==
In his book Country Music: A Biographical Dictionary, author Richard Carlin describes Supernaw's version of the song as "raising the ire of stepfathers everywhere" because the son does not accept his stepfather. Michael McCall, reviewing Red and Rio Grande for Allmusic, called it an "anthem for divorced fathers."

== Chart positions ==
=== Kenny Rogers ===
Chart (1988)	Peak position
U.S. Billboard Hot Country Singles	86

=== Doug Supernaw ===
Chart (1993)	Peak position
Canada Country Singles (RPM)	27
US Hot Country Songs (Billboard)	1
