= Encore Enterprises =

Real estate company

Encore Enterprises, Inc.
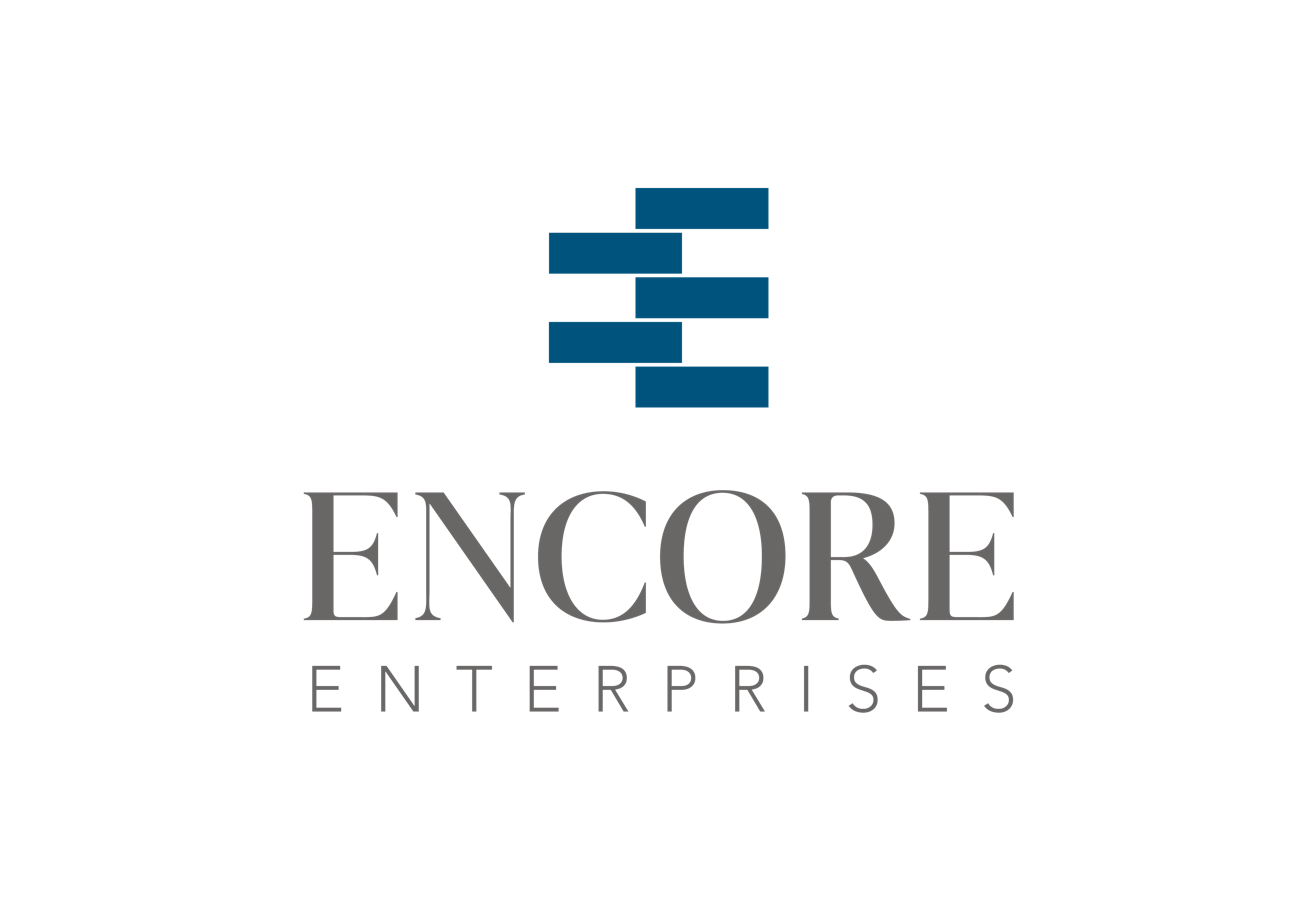
- Company type: Privately held company
- Industry: Alternatives Holding Company; Commercial Real Estate; Middle-Market Investment
- Founded: 1999; 27 years ago
- Founder: Dr. Bharat Sangani
- Headquarters: 16980 Dallas Pkwy, #200, Dallas, TX 75248
- Key people: Dr. Bharat Sangani, C.E.O., Chairman; Yatin Gandhi, C.F.O. Nili Sangani, SVP Operations; Cynthia Price, General Counsel
- Number of employees: 4,000+
- Website: encore.bz

Encore Enterprises, Inc. is a privately held United States investment and real estate development company headquartered in the Dallas–Fort Worth metroplex. The firm was founded in 1999 and operates across multiple sectors, including multifamily, hospitality, retail, office, gas stations, quick-service restaurants, healthcare, and private equity. As of 2025, it manages more than $1.6 billion in assets and has completed over 150 transactions with a total value exceeding $3.8 billion.

== Business divisions ==
Encore Enterprises operates through several divisions, each focused on a specific sector of its investment and development portfolio:

- Encore Multifamily – Develops and manages vibrant apartment communities, from new construction projects to revitalized value-add properties in key U.S. markets.
- Encore Commercial – Develops, acquires, and operates retail properties across the U.S., creating welcoming community hubs for shopping and connection.
- Encore Hospitality – Invests in non-gateway U.S. markets, leveraging ground-up construction and value-add strategies to unlock each hotel's true potential.
- Surepoint Emergency Centers – Operates advanced stand-alone emergency rooms across Texas, providing efficient, convenient access to high-quality care with minimal wait times.
- Partnerships for Dentists – Provides management support and strategic resources to a growing network of dental clinics while preserving the unique character of each participating practice.
- Encore Restaurants – Structures and manages quick-service franchise portfolios, leveraging extensive experience to drive value creation and portfolio expansion.
- Encore Construction – Provides in-house construction and project management services that fuels the growth of the real estate businesses and restaurant franchise portfolios.

== Investment approach ==
Encore Enterprises focuses on diversification across cyclical and stable sectors. Its investment philosophy emphasizes long-term value creation through disciplined financial management, strategic partnerships, and integrated operational expertise.

== Affiliated companies ==
Ignite Investments, Encore's exclusive capital-raising partner and wholly-owned subsidiary is a women-led platform dedicated to delivering white-glove service and cultivating long-term partnerships. Ignite connects investors to curated opportunities within Encore's real estate and business ventures. Through personalized support, Ignite empowers investors to pursue lasting growth alongside Encore.
