= Hello in There =

Studio album by David Allan Coe
- Released: 1983
- Studio: Eleven Eleven, CBS Nashville
- Genre: Country
- Label: Columbia
- Producer: Billy Sherrill

David Allan Coe chronology
Castles in the Sand (1983)	Hello in There (1983)	Just Divorced (1984)

Hello in There is an album released by country musician David Allan Coe, released in 1983 on Columbia Records.

== Recording ==
Hello in There was Coe's second LP of 1983 and sixth Columbia album of the decade. (He released Underground Album, a collection of explicit material, independently on his own record label.) As he did on previous releases, Coe divides the record into two sections, Country Side and a City Side, although beyond this no apparent concept is evident. The opener, "Crazy Old Soldier," hearkens back to the outlaw country sound Coe helped pioneer, with lyrics that juxtaposes regret, defiance, acceptance, and resignation, as does "I Ain't Gonna Let You Go Again," which features Warren Haynes on lead guitar. The title track, which was written by John Prine and appeared on his 1971 debut, tells the story of an old elderly couple whose children have all moved away. AllMusic's Thom Jurek calls Coe's reading "wonderful. He turns the lyric inward, like a reflection in a mirror." Another cover is his rendition of Jerry Butler's "He Will Break Your Heart," and once again Coe demonstrates his abilities as an interpreter of material outside the country genre.

Coe, who initially achieved fame as a songwriter at the beginning of his career, contributes four songs, including "Drinkin' to Forget" and "Someone Special," which quotes Hank Thompson's "Wild Side of Life" on the intro. Another original, "Out of Your Mind," is reminiscent of John Conlee's 1978 smash "Rose Colored Glasses," with Coe's vocal phrasing similar to Conlee's. "For Lover's, Pt. 2" is the sequel to a tune with the same name that concluded the previous album Castles in the Sand, containing the same cocktail lounge opening before moving into a piano-based Rolling Stones-sounding groove.

== Reception ==
Hello in There reached #38 on the country albums chart. AllMusic: "Once more there is evidence that Coe's entire period with Columbia and his partnership with Billy Sherrill resulted in consistently high-level work despite the fact that Nashville was changing around him and his trademark brand of restless yet utterly faithful country music was being squeezed from the picture".

== Track listing ==
=== Country Side ===
1. "Crazy Old Soldier" (Paul Kennerley/Troy Seals)
2. "Out of Your Mind" (David Allan Coe)
3. "Mister, Don't Speak Bad About My Music" (Bjorn Hakanson/OrhanEnglund)
4. "Drinkin' to Forget" (Coe)
5. "Gotta Travel On" (Coe)

=== City Side ===
1. "He Will Break Your Heart" (Calvin Carter/Curtis Mayfield/Jerry Butler)
2. "For Lovers Only, Pt. 2" (Coe)
3. "Hello in There" (John Prine)
4. "Someone Special" (Coe)
5. "I Ain't Gonna Let You Go Again" (Michael Stripling)
