= Reno (Doug Supernaw song) =

Single by Doug Supernaw

from the album Red and Rio Grande
- B-side: "Honky Tonkin' Fool"
- Released: May 17, 1993
- Genre: Country
- Length: 3:33
- Label: BNA
- Songwriter(s): Tim Buckley; Don Crider; Joe Deleon; Allen Huff; Kenny King; Doug Supernaw; Justin White
- Producer(s): Richard Landis

Doug Supernaw singles chronology
| "Honky Tonkin' Fool" (1993) | "Reno" (1993) | "I Don't Call Him Daddy" (1993) |

"Reno" is a song co-written and recorded by American country music artist Doug Supernaw. It was released in May 1993 as the second single from his album Red and Rio Grande. It peaked at number 4 in the United States, and number 12 in Canada. It was his first top ten hit.

== Content ==
"Reno" is a mid-tempo ballad played in the key of F. The narrator compares his former lover to the city of Reno, Nevada, saying that she will draw him in "like the lights of the casino" and "play with you a while."

== Controversy ==
The song caused local controversy in Reno, Nevada due to its portrayal of the city. Then-mayor Pete Sferrazza thought that the song portrayed the city as "heartless", and one country station refused to play the song due to complaints from listeners.

== Music video ==
The music video was directed by Sherman Halsey. It shows Doug Supernaw playing the song with his band, as well as scenes with him and the band walking around the city and gambling in various casinos. It was partially in black and white, while some of it was in color.

== Chart positions ==
| Chart (1993) | Peak position |
|---|---|
| US Hot Country Songs (Billboard) | 4 |
| Canadian RPM Country Tracks | 12 |
