= Texas Moon =

Studio album by David Allan Coe
- Released: 1977
- Genre: Country
- Label: Plantation

David Allan Coe chronology
Rides Again (1977)	Texas Moon (1977)	Tattoo (1977)

Texas Moon is an album recorded by country musician David Allan Coe in 1973, but not released until 1977 on Plantation Records.

== Background ==
Recorded in 1973, this collection of mostly cover songs was finally released in 1977 on Shelby Singleton’s Plantation Records, a convenient cash-in on the outlaw country movement, which was at its height at the time. The collection displays Coe’s ability as an interpretive singer as he tackles songs written by some of his favourite artists, such as Kris Kristofferson, Mickey Newbury, Guy Clark, Billy Joe Shaver, and Johnny Cash. AllMusic reviewer Thom Jurek singles out the Jackson Browne composition “These Days” for particular praise, enthusing “unlike its author's version, is devoid of naive sentiment – or Nico’s Gothic, lost-in-darkness version. Instead, with real physicality and empathy, Coe 's delivery reveals the weariness and helplessness in the lyric.”

== Reception ==
Professional ratings
Review scores
Source	Rating
AllMusic	2.5/5 stars

AllMusic wrote: "Though it's usually regarded as one of the 'for hardcore DAC fans only' titles, Texas Moon is well worth re-investigation."

== Track listing ==
1. "Got You on My Mind" (Howard Biggs, Joe Thomas)
2. "These Days" (Jackson Browne)
3. "A Satisfied Mind" (Red Hayes, Jack Rhodes)
4. "Why You Been Gone So Long" (Mickey Newbury)
5. "Why Me" (Kris Kristofferson)
6. "Mary Magdeline" (David Allan Coe)
7. "Fuzzy Was An Outlaw" (David Allan Coe)
8. "That Old Time Feeling" (Guy Clark)
9. "Ride Me Down Easy" (Billy Joe Shaver)
10. "Give My Love to Rose" (Johnny Cash)
