= Once Upon a Rhyme =

Studio album by David Allan Coe
- Released: June 1975
- Recorded: 1975
- Studio: Columbia Studio in Nashville
- Genre: Country, outlaw country
- Length: 33:17
- Label: Columbia
- Producer: Ron Bledsoe

David Allan Coe chronology
The Mysterious Rhinestone Cowboy (1974)	Once Upon a Rhyme (1975)	Longhaired Redneck (1976)

Once Upon a Rhyme is the fourth studio album by American country singer David Allan Coe. It was released in 1975 on Columbia.

== Recording ==
Once Upon a Rhyme contains one of Coe's biggest hits, “You Never Even Called Me by My Name,” and one of his most famous compositions, “Would You Lay with Me (In a Field of Stone)”. The former was written by Steve Goodman and John Prine and first appeared on Goodman's 1971 debut. Coe's version became his only country Top 10 hit single to date, peaking at #8 in 1975, and includes a spoken epilogue where Coe relates a correspondence he had with songwriter Steve Goodman, who stated the song he had written was the "perfect country and western song." Coe wrote back stating that no song could fit that description without mentioning a laundry list of clichés: "Mama, or trains, or trucks, or prison, or getting drunk". Goodman's equally facetious response was an additional verse that incorporated all five of Coe's requirements, and upon receiving it, Coe acknowledged that the finished product was indeed the "perfect country and western song" and included the last verse on the record:

I was drunk the day Mama got out of prison
And I went to pick 'er up in the rain
But before I could get to the station in my pickup truck
She got runned over by a damned ol' train

“Would You Lay with Me (“In a Field of Stone”) was originally recorded by American country music artist Tanya Tucker and released in December 1973 as the first single and title track from the album Would You Lay with Me (In a Field of Stone). It topped the U.S. country chart on March 30, 1974, for one week and was Tucker's third number-one song on the chart. On the Billboard Hot 100, the song peaked at number 46. Coe's version appeared as the b-side of “You Never Even Called Me by My Name,” and it would also be recorded as a duet by Waylon Jennings and Willie Nelson in 1983 and by Johnny Cash on his album American Recordings: Solitary Man. The song, which contains poetic lyrics questioning the devotion of a prospective lover, was surprising to many considering it originated from a tattooed ex-con who bragged about doing jail time for murder and ran with a biker gang called The Outlaws. Another ballad, “Jody like a Melody,” was a favorite of Coe's, with the songwriter confessing later:

“Jody Like a Melody” is probably one of my favorite songs because as a songwriter, up until I had written that song, I had been writing songs in three chords, you know, real simple stuff. In that song I wrote the string arrangements and key changes and everything. It opened up a lot of doors for me. That same day I wrote "Jody Like a Melody,” “Would You Lay With Me In a Field of Stone,” and “Would You Be My Lady.”

In his AllMusic review of the album, Thom Jurek writes, “After the emotional impact of the first two tracks, add two self-penned masterpieces – ‘Loneliness in Ruby's Eyes’ and ‘Would You Be My Lady’ - and the listener is left nearly breathless. But with Coe, that's not enough, and he digs deeper emotionally with ‘Sweet Vibrations’ and ‘Another Pretty Country Song.’"

Producer Rod Beldsoe utilises many of the same top shelf musicians and session players on this album as he had on Coe's major label debut the year before.

== Reception ==
Professional ratings
Review scores
Source	Rating
Allmusic	5/5 stars

Allmusic: "Once Upon a Rhyme and its predecessor, The Mysterious Rhinestone Cowboy, established Coe as a major songwriting force; they remain enduring testaments to his songwriting brilliance as a criminally under-examined talent in the country tradition."

== Track listing ==
All Songs written by David Allan Coe except where noted.

1. "Would You Lay with Me (In a Field of Stone)" – 2:42
2. "Jody Like a Melody" (Coe, Jimmy Lewis Howard) – 3:03
3. "Loneliness in Ruby's Eyes" – 3:06
4. "Would You Be My Lady" – 2:49
5. "Sweet Vibrations (Some Folks Call It Love)" (Coe, Debbie Cole) – 3:05
6. "Another Pretty Country Song" (Coe, Oris R. Clark) – 3:22
7. "Piece of Wood and Steel" (Richard Dobson) – 4:06
8. "Fraulein" (Lawton Williams) – 2:45
9. "Shine It On" (Tom Jans, Jeff Barry) – 3:03
10. "You Never Even Called Me By My Name" (Steve Goodman, John Prine) – 5:16

== Personnel ==
- David Allan Coe, The Nashville Edition, The Jordanaires – vocals
- Billy Sanford, John Christopher, Tommy Allsup, Reggie Young – guitar
- Pete Drake – steel guitar, dobro
- Mike Leech, Henry Strzelecki, Ted Reynolds – bass
- Kenny Malone, Larrie Londin, Buster Phillips – drums
- Hargus "Pig" Robbins, Ron Oates – piano
- Buddy Spicher – violin, mandolin
- Charlie McCoy – harmonica, vibes
- The Nashville String Machine – strings
- Ron Bledsoe – production
