= Rides Again (David Allan Coe album) =

Studio album by David Allan Coe
- Released: January 1977
- Genre: Outlaw country
- Length: 34:19
- Label: Columbia
- Producer: Ron Bledsoe

David Allan Coe chronology
Longhaired Redneck (1976)	Rides Again (1977)	Texas Moon (1977)

Professional ratings
Review scores
Source	Rating
Allmusic	link

Rides Again is an album released by country musician David Allan Coe. It was released in 1977 on Columbia.

== Background ==
By 1977, the outlaw country movement was nearing its apex, having seen the release of Wanted! The Outlaws, country music's first platinum selling album, and Willie Nelson’s blockbuster LP Red Headed Stranger. Artists like Nelson and Waylon Jennings eschewed Nashville's strict studio regime and fought to record their own music their way, producing albums featuring music that brought a new realism previously unheard to country music. These albums often included compositions by groundbreaking songwriters such as Kris Kristofferson, Mickey Newbury, and Billy Joe Shaver, among others. David Allan Coe was part of this movement, having written “Would You Lay with Me (In a Field of Stone),” which became Tanya Tucker’s third #1 country single in 1974, and having scored the Top Ten hit “You Never Even Called Me by My Name” in 1975. After recording two albums that went nowhere, Coe signed with Columbia and released The Mysterious Rhinestone Cowboy in 1974, his major label debut. Although capable of writing deeply tender love songs, Coe's outrageous appearance, defiant attitude, and controversial background kept him from being fully embraced by the mainstream in the same way some of his peers would be. By 1977, Coe considered himself as integral as anyone in the evolution of the outlaw country genre, and began saying so in his music. As noted in Thom Jurek's AllMusic review of the album, “On Rides Again, by trying to make a conscious outlaw record and aligning himself with the movement's two progenitors on the opening track, 'Willie, Waylon, and Me'... Coe already set up self-parody unintentionally - something that continued to curse him.” The song is also significant in the way that it borrows and parodies elements of the song "Helplessly Hoping" by Crosby, Stills, and Nash.

== Recording ==
Rides Again was the fourth album Coe recorded for Columbia produced by Ron Bledsoe. The songs crossfade without the usual silences between tracks, which was unusual for country music, and feature Coe's heavily phased guitar. Coe was also permitted to use his own band on several tracks, a major concession for Columbia at the time. The album opens with the title track, a barrelling outlaw country anthem that celebrates the musical vision and individuality of several rock acts such as The Flying Burrito Brothers, The Byrds, and The Eagles, but then proclaims, “In Texas the talk turned to outlaws like Waylon, Willie, and me.” As recounted in Michael Streissguth's book Outlaw: Waylon, Willie, Kris, and the Renegades of Nashville, some of his peers resented Coe placing himself in such exalted company, and felt he was exploiting his relationship with his fellow outlaws. Jennings drummer Richie Albright called Coe “a great, great songwriter. A great singer. But he could not tell the truth if it was better than a lie he'd made up. Waylon didn't make him comfortable enough to hang around.” Jennings actually played guitar on “Willie, Waylon and Me” but, according to Albright, “walked out of there and said, ‘Shit, I don't know why I did that.’” Coe's integrity was also called into question after his previous claim that he'd spent time on death row for killing an inmate who tried to rape him was debunked when a Texas documentarian discovered Coe had done time for possessing burglary tools and indecent materials, never murder. Criticisms such as these notwithstanding, Coe always maintained he was integral to the movement getting its name, explaining in 2003:

…the truth is that Waylon and Willie Nelson and I played at an outdoor festival called 48 Hours in Atoka, in Oklahoma...When we got there...several women were raped and people stabbed! There was a lot of alcohol and drugs or whatever. I told my band, “Don't worry about it. We'll provide our own protection.” At that time I was in the Outlaws Motorcycle Club. I had my Outlaws' colors on, and I had my pistol in my pocket and I rode my motorcycle up on stage while Waylon was singing. I got off my motorcycle and went out and started singing with Waylon. And then Willie came out and sang with us. There was a picture of us in the paper that had an arrow pointing to the pistol in my pocket and another arrow pointing to where it said, “Outlaws, Florida.” The headline said, “The Outlaws came to town.” That's actually how it all started.

Regardless of the galling impression he made on some of his peers, no one could deny Coe's ability to write stellar country songs and sing them with stunning conviction, as is evident on “Greener Than the Grass We Laid On” and the cheating honky tonk ballad “Under Rachel's Wings," while “Lately I’ve Been Thinking Too Much Lately” and Donnie Murphy's “Laid Back and Wasted” chronicle hardcore alcohol and drug abuse in the face of crushing failure and lost love. But Coe also remained uncompromising when it came to his lifestyle and language, even though it kept him off country playlists and award shows. “The House We’ve Been Calling Home,” for example, explores the theme of polygamy (“Me and my wives have been spending our lives in a house we’ve been calling a home..."), while the final cut on the album, “If That Ain’t Country (I’ll Kiss Your Ass),” finds Coe uttering a racial slur on record for the first time, singing the line “Workin’ like a nigger for my room and board.” The song paints a picture of a Texas family that verges on caricature, with the narrator describing his tattooed father as “veteran proud” and deeming his oldest sister “a first-rate whore.” While comparatively tame next to the pair of underground X-rated albums he would record later, the song further alienated Coe from the country mainstream and kick-started accusations that he was a racist, a charge he always vehemently denied. In 2004 he remarked:

I am a songwriter, you know, and to me it has always bothered me that actors in the movies can say whatever they want to say, kill people, rape people and do things and no one ever accuses them personally of being that way. But when you write a song and then all of a sudden you are being accused of something. To me, songwriting is painting a picture and all you have to work with is words… I grew up with all my life hearing, “lazy as a Mexican,” “stingy as a Jew,” “working like a nigger,” or “dumb as a Polock.” It’s stereotype stuff that you hear growing up that immediately puts a picture in your head.

== Reception ==
Giving the album three out of five stars, AllMusic laments that Rides Again "might have been an exceptional album if Coe could only have contained his anger at the musical establishment in Nash Vegas, and not begun caricaturing himself - which added credibility to critics. This is not the place to start with Coe, but fans will most certainly want at least half of the tracks on this album."

== Track listing ==
All songs written by David Allan Coe and Deborah L. Coe except where noted.

1. "Willie, Waylon and Me" – 3:14
2. "The House We've Been Calling Home" – 2:53
3. "Young Dallas Cowboy" – 2:29
4. "A Sense of Humor" – 1:39
5. "The Punkin Center Barn Dance" (Coe, Lonnie Dearman) – 2:28
6. "Willie, Waylon and Me (Reprise)" – 1:10
7. "Lately I've Been Thinking Too Much Lately" – 3:20
8. "Laid Back and Wasted" (Donnie Murphy) – 2:33
9. "Under Rachel's Wings" (Coe, Fred Spears, Stephen Loggans) – 3:08
10. "Greener Than the Grass (We Laid On)" (Coe) – 3:35
11. "If That Ain't Country" (Coe, Deborah L. Coe, Fred Spears) – 4:50
