= Longhaired Redneck (song) =

Single by David Allan Coe

from the album Longhaired Redneck
- B-side: "Would You Lay with Me"
- Released: January 1976
- Genre: Country, Outlaw country
- Length: 3:24
- Label: Columbia
- Songwriter(s): David Allan Coe, Jimmy Rabbitt
- Producer(s): Ron Bledsoe

David Allan Coe singles chronology
"You Never Even Called Me by My Name" (1975)	"Longhaired Redneck" (1976)	"When She's Got Me (Where She Wants Me)" (1976)

"Longhaired Redneck" is a song co-written and recorded by American country music artist David Allan Coe. It was released in January 1976 as the lead single from Coe's album of the same name. The song is notable for its direct reference to the "outlaw" movement in country music during the 1970s, with which Coe was associated, as well as the chorus which features Coe impersonating classic country artists Ernest Tubb, "Whisperin'" Bill Anderson, and Merle Haggard. The song also makes reference to Johnny Rodriguez stealing an Angora goat from a ranch near Utopia, Texas owned by Uvalde County Judge Bob Davis, which ultimately led to Rodriguez being discovered. The song peaked at number 17 on the U.S. Billboard Hot Country Singles chart and at number 23 on the Canadian RPM Country Tracks chart. It was written by Coe with Jimmy Rabbitt, who is also a popular radio DJ in Texas.

== Cover versions ==
GG Allin, the American punk rock singer-songwriter best remembered for his notorious live performances, covered the song with rewritten and parodied (explicit) lyrics on his album Freaks, Faggots, Drunks and Junkies. He retitled the song "Outlaw Scumfuc".

Finnish country rock band Freud Marx Engels & Jung recorded the song in Finnish as Pitkätukkainen punaniska in 1986. It is almost a verbatim translation of the original.

== Chart performance ==
Chart (1976)	Peak position
U.S. Billboard Hot Country Singles	17
Canadian RPM Country Tracks	23
