= She Used to Love Me a Lot =

Single by David Allan Coe

from the album Darlin', Darlin'
- B-side: "For Lovers Only (Part IV)"
- Released: December 3, 1984
- Genre: Country
- Length: 3:04
- Label: Columbia
- Songwriters: Dennis Morgan, Charles Quillen, Kye Fleming
- Producer: Billy Sherrill

David Allan Coe singles chronology
"It's Great to Be Single Again" (1984)	"She Used to Love Me a Lot" (1984)	"Don't Cry Darlin'" (1985)

"She Used to Love Me a Lot" is a song recorded by American country music artist David Allan Coe. It was released in December 1984 as the lead single from Coe's album Darlin', Darlin. The song peaked at #11 on both the U.S. Billboard Hot Country Singles chart and the Canadian RPM Country Tracks chart. It was written by Dennis Morgan, Charles Quillen, and Kye Fleming. A version of the song by Johnny Cash was recorded in the early 1980s, but remained unreleased until 2014 (on Out Among the Stars).

== Chart performance ==
Chart (1984–1985)	Peak position
US Hot Country Songs (Billboard)	11
Canadian RPM Country Tracks	11
