= You Never Even Call Me by My Name =

1975 single by David Allan Coe

"You Never Even Called Me by My Name"

Single by David Allan Coe
- B-side: "Would You Lay with Me (In a Field Of Stone?)"
- Released: June 1975
- Genre: Outlaw country, style parody
- Length: 5:16
- Label: Columbia
- Songwriters: Steve Goodman; John Prine (uncredited)
- Producer: Ron Bledsoe

David Allan Coe singles chronology
| "Would You Be My Lady" (1975) | "You Never Even Called Me by My Name" (1975) | "Longhaired Redneck" (1975) |

"You Never Even Call Me by My Name" is a song written by Steve Goodman and John Prine. Prine requested to be uncredited on the song, as he thought it was a "goofy, novelty song" and did not want to "offend the country music community". Goodman released the song on his 1971 debut album Steve Goodman to little acclaim. It was more famously recorded by country music singer David Allan Coe, under the title "You Never Even Called Me by My Name", on his 1975 album Once Upon a Rhyme. It was the third single release of Coe's career and his first Top Ten hit, reaching a peak of number eight on the Billboard country singles charts. The song, over five minutes long, is known for its humorous self-description as "the perfect country and western song."

On a WNEW-FM radio show, 1987. John Prine told his version of the story behind the song. He said that he and Goodman had recently scored their first recording contract in New York City and Paul Anka had been assigned to them as their manager. As a regular performer at the Waldorf-Astoria Hotel, Anka had a grand luxury suite dedicated for his use as a dressing room. But since Anka already lived in New York he did not need it. So he let Goodman and Prine stay there to write music while they were in town. Prine says they raided the suite's full bar and "mixed a special cocktail punch" in the sink with "...Dom Perignon, a little bit of brandy, a little bit of Jack Daniels, quite a bit of Wild Turkey; and some vodka and gin; and some punch and 7up." So, the song was completed while they were wildly intoxicated.

== Content ==
Goodman and Prine originally composed the song as a pastiche and style parody of "every country song" they had ever heard. In live performances, Goodman would often adopt a parody of Hank Williams Sr.'s performance style, with a large cowboy hat. Waylon Jennings, Charley Pride and Merle Haggard (as well as his song "The Fightin' Side of Me") are mentioned in the lyrics; Coe also uses loose impersonations of each artist in doing so, and also makes reference to Faron Young's "Hello Walls" in the background vocals, noting that "you don't have to call me" any of those names anymore. In the third verse, Coe notes "the only time I know I'll hear David Allan Coe is when Jesus has his final Judgment Day."

In a spoken epilogue preceding the song's iconic closing verse, Coe relates a correspondence he had with Goodman, who stated the song he had written was the "perfect country and western song." Coe wrote back stating that no song could fit that description without mentioning a laundry list of clichés from the genre: "Mama, or trains, or trucks, or prison, or getting drunk". Goodman's equally facetious response was an additional verse that incorporated all five of Coe's requirements, and upon receiving it, Coe acknowledged that the finished product was indeed the "perfect country and western song" and included the last verse on the record:

I was drunk the day my mom got out of prison
And I went to pick her up in the rain
But before I could get to the station in my pickup truck
She got runned over by a damned old train

Goodman, in his versions, commented that there were some other ideas he missed, including farms, Dallas, divorce, dead dogs like Old Shep, and Christmas. He also mentioned, in various performances, Freddy Fender, Charlie Rich and Charlie the Tuna instead of Jennings, and his name on the sign was a neon sign hanging over "the bar I used to own," with the verse likewise restructured to fit without Coe's name.

Coe's recording is accompanied mainly by resonator guitar, pedal steel guitar, electric guitar and bass guitar.

== Chart performance ==
"You Never Even Called Me by My Name" by David Allan Coe spent 17 weeks on the Billboard country singles charts, peaking at number eight.

=== Weekly charts ===
| Chart (1975) | Peak position |
|---|---|
| US Hot Country Songs (Billboard) | 8 |
| Canadian RPM Country Tracks | 4 |

=== Year-end charts ===
| Chart (1975) | Position |
|---|---|
| US Hot Country Songs (Billboard) | 25 |

== Doug Supernaw version ==
"You Never Even Call Me by My Name"

Single by Doug Supernaw

from the album Deep Thoughts from a Shallow Mind
- B-side: "State Fair"
- Released: August 1994
- Genre: Country
- Length: 4:04
- Label: BNA
- Songwriters: Steve Goodman; John Prine (uncredited)
- Producer: Richard Landis

Doug Supernaw singles chronology
| "State Fair" (1994) | "You Never Even Call Me by My Name" (1994) | "What'll You Do About Me" (1995) |

In 1994, Doug Supernaw recorded a new version of the song on his second studio album, Deep Thoughts from a Shallow Mind. Supernaw's rendition features a guest vocal from Coe himself, as well as guest appearances by Waylon Jennings, Merle Haggard and Charley Pride, all of whom are mentioned in the original song's second verse. It was the second single release from Supernaw's album.

=== Critical reception ===
Freelance writer Alanna Nash wrote in Entertainment Weekly that she considered Supernaw's remake the "most interesting" cut on the album, but thought that it was in too high of a key for the guest vocalists involved.

=== Chart performance ===
This version spent seven weeks on the Billboard country charts, peaking at number 60. Only Supernaw was credited for it on the charts.

| Chart (1994) | Peak position |
|---|---|
| Canada Country Singles (RPM) | 68 |
| US Hot Country Songs (Billboard) | 60 |
