= Mona Lisa Lost Her Smile =

Single by David Allan Coe

from the album Just Divorced
- B-side: "Someone Special"
- Released: March 1984
- Genre: Country
- Length: 3:38
- Label: Columbia
- Songwriter: Johnny Cunningham
- Producer: Billy Sherrill

David Allan Coe singles chronology
"Ride 'em Cowboy" (1983)	"Mona Lisa Lost Her Smile" (1984)	"It's Great to Be Single Again" (1984)

"Mona Lisa Lost Her Smile" is a song written by Johnny Cunningham and recorded by David Allan Coe. It was the first single from Coe's 1984 album Just Divorced, and was released to radio in early 1984. The song is Coe's highest-charting single, with a peak of number two on the U.S. country music chart, behind "I Got Mexico" by Eddy Raven.

== Content ==
The song is a mid-tempo ballad about a young blonde girl, featuring allusions to the iconic Da Vinci painting.

== Critical reception ==
Thom Jurek of AllMusic described the song favorably in his review, saying that "[t]he layered strings and organ work are slick, but they add such warmth and depth in contrast to Coe's voice that it works to devastating effect."

== Chart performance ==
The song spent twenty-two weeks on the Billboard country singles chart, reaching a peak of number two and accounting for Coe's highest peak there. In Canada, it reached number one on the RPM Country Tracks chart dated for June 30, 1984.

=== Weekly charts ===
Chart (1984)	Peak position
US Hot Country Songs (Billboard)	2
Canadian RPM Country Tracks	1

=== Year-end charts ===
Chart (1984)	Position
US Hot Country Songs (Billboard)	13
