= The Ride (David Allan Coe song) =

Single by David Allan Coe

from the album Castles in the Sand
- B-side: "Son of a Rebel Son"
- Released: February 28, 1983
- Genre: Country; Outlaw country
- Length: 3:06
- Label: Columbia
- Songwriters: John Blayne Detterline, Jr., Gary Gentry
- Producer: Billy Sherrill

David Allan Coe singles chronology
"Whiskey Whiskey" (1982)	"The Ride" (1983)	"Cheap Thrills" (1983)

"The Ride" is a song recorded by American country singer-songwriter David Allan Coe. It was released in February 1983 as the lead single from the album, Castles in the Sand. The song spent 19 weeks on the Billboard country singles charts, reaching a peak of number four and peaked at number two on the Canadian RPM Country Tracks chart.

== Background and writing ==
Writer Gary Gentry told Billboard magazine, "there's a mysterious magic connected with this song that spells cold chills, leading me to believe that it was meant to be and that David Allan Coe was meant to record it." He goes on to say that when he looked up the date of Williams' death in his autobiography, he opened the book to the exact page. Later, when he was performing the song at the Opry House for a television show, the lights and power in the Opryland complex went out when performing the last verse when it says, 'Hank'.

== Content ==
The ballad tells the first-person story of a hitchhiker's encounter with the ghost of Hank Williams, Sr., on a ride from Montgomery, Alabama to Nashville, Tennessee. The mysterious driver, "dressed like 1950, half drunk and hollow-eyed" and driving an "antique Cadillac" (referring to the baby blue 1952 Cadillac convertible that Williams died in), questions the narrator whether he has the musical talent and dedication to become a star in the country music industry. The song's lyrics place the events on U.S. Route 31 or the largely parallel Interstate 65.

== History ==
The song first appeared on Coe's Castles in the Sand album. It was first covered by Hank Williams Jr., later by Tim McGraw (appearing at the end of the "Real Good Man" music video, which was recorded live), then by Garth Brooks on his album Time Traveler.

== Chart performance ==
Chart (1983)	Peak position
U.S. Billboard Hot Country Singles	4
Canadian RPM Country Tracks	2
