= Nudie suit =

Suit style popular in western wear from the 1940s through the 1980s

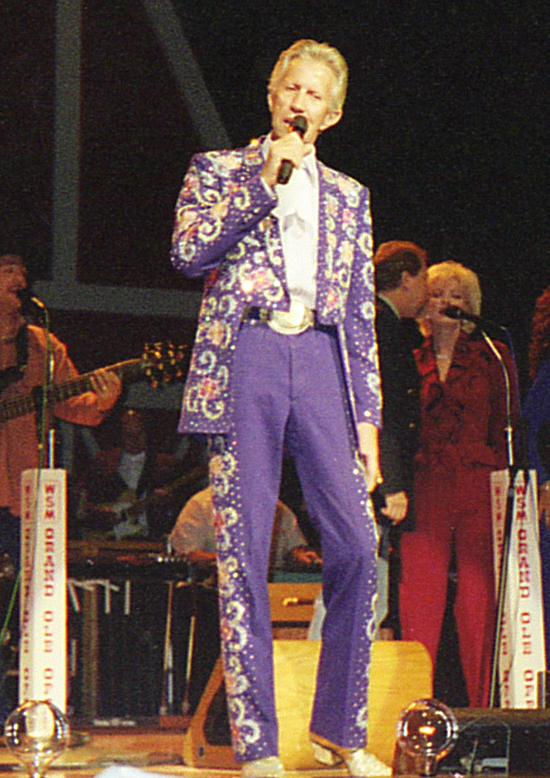
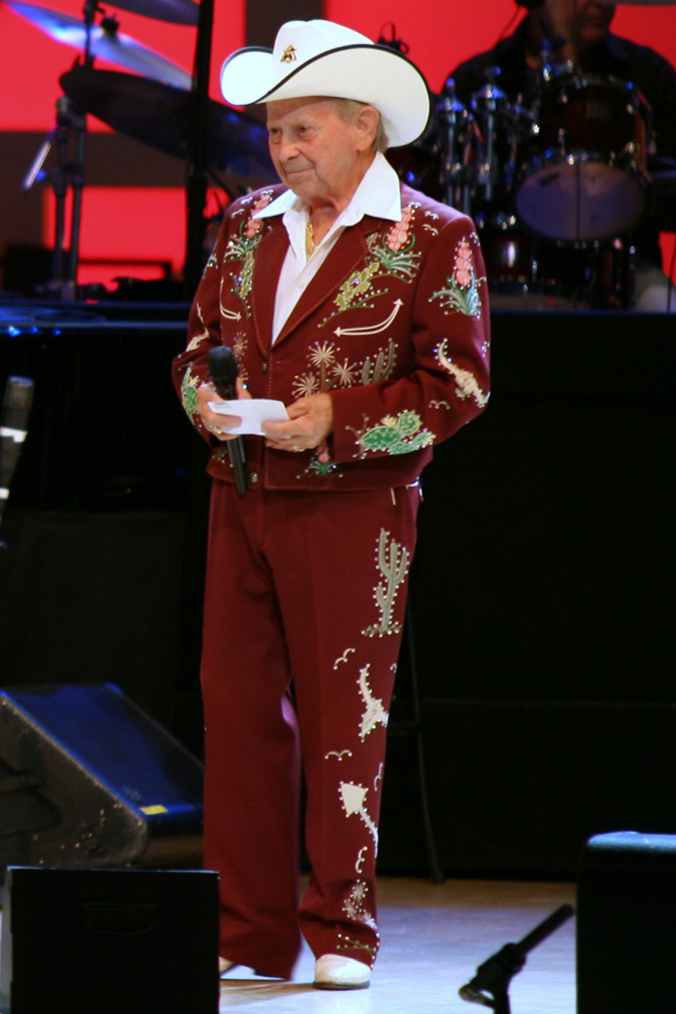
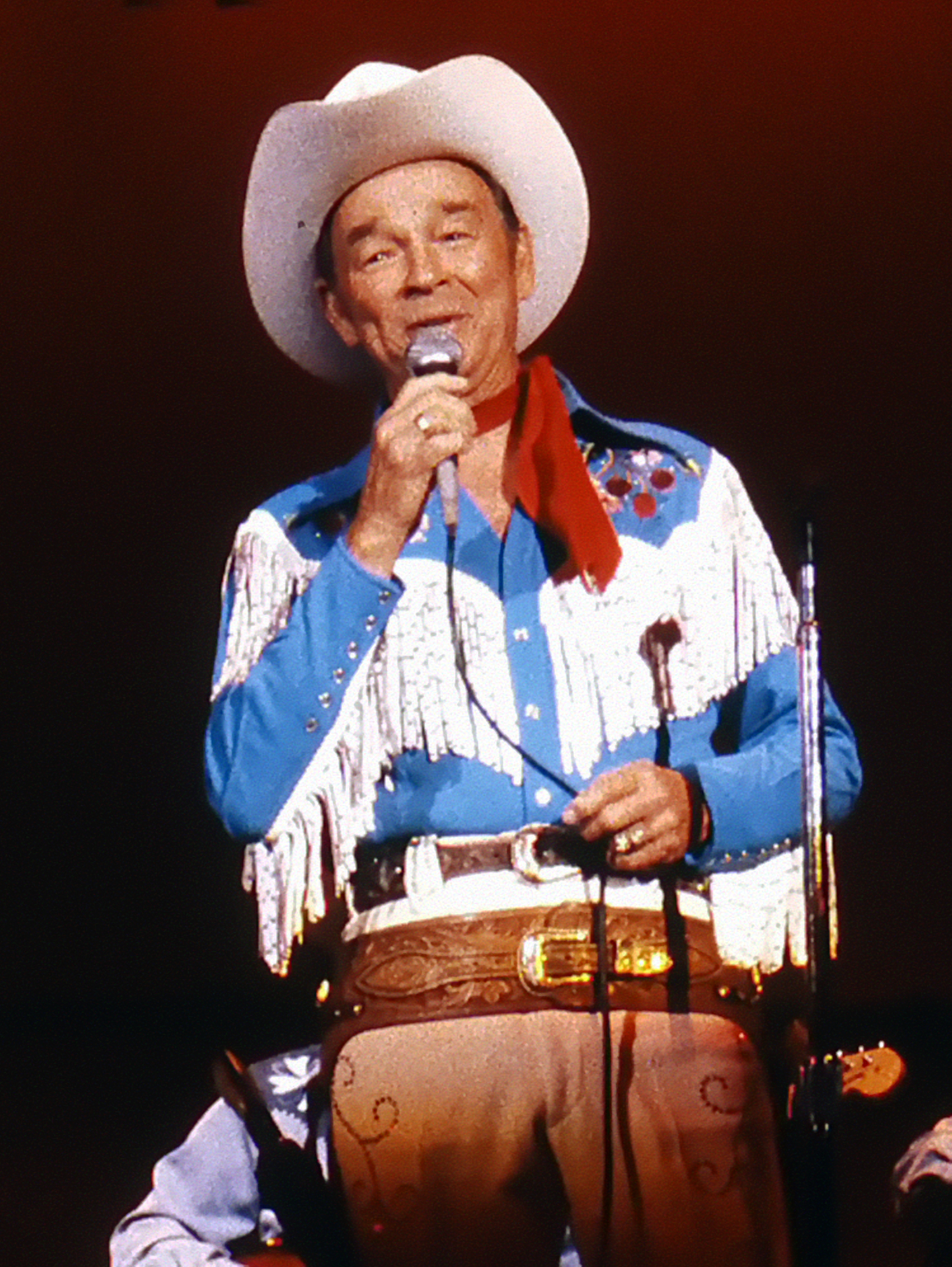
Porter Wagoner, Little Jimmy Dickens, and Roy Rogers, sporting Nudie Suits in 1999, 2007, and 1983 respectively.

A Nudie Suit is a brand name of rhinestone decorated cowboy attire worn most notably by numerous popular country music artists from the 1940s until inventor Nudie Cohn's death in the 1980s.

Numerous musicians wore the suits such as Roy Rogers, Hank Williams, Webb Pierce, Buck Owens, Elvis Presley, Porter Wagoner, Gram Parsons, Keith Richards, Elton John, and Marty Stuart, among others. While its popularity died down following Cohn's death in 1984, the style is still a popular item in the wardrobe of country music artists today, with musicians like Margo Price, Post Malone, Charley Crockett, and others consistently sporting them while performing.

== Nudie's Rodeo Tailors ==
Nudie's Rodeo Tailors
- Type: Privately held company
- Industry: Fashion
- Founded: 1940
- Founders: Nudie Cohn; Bobbie Cohn
- Defunct: 1994 (as a tailor)
- Headquarters: Hollywood, California, US
- Products: Western wear, Nudie suit, Cowboy boots, Nudie Mobiles
- Owners: Jamie Nudie
- Website: www.nudiesrodeotailors.com

Nudie's Rodeo Tailors, is a clothing company currently based in Nashville, Tennessee, founded in 1940 by Ukrainian immigrant Nudie Cohn and his wife Bobbie Cohn in Hollywood, California.

== History ==
Nudie Cohn first started designing his signature suits in 1940 in his home garage in Hollywood, California, alongside his wife Bobbie Cohn. In 1947 they would start producing commercially with the help of country singer Tex Williams, who sold his prized horse to help fund the Cohn's operation.

The tailoring side of Nudie's officially closed their doors in 1994, however still continues on today as a clothing brand.

After the tailoring side of Nudie's Rodeo Tailors closed, numerous other tailors have came along to fill the company's place. Companies such as Jukebox Mama, Union Western Wear, and Fort Lonesome, among others all make Nudie Suits today, as it is still a very popular item in western wear.

== Characteristics ==
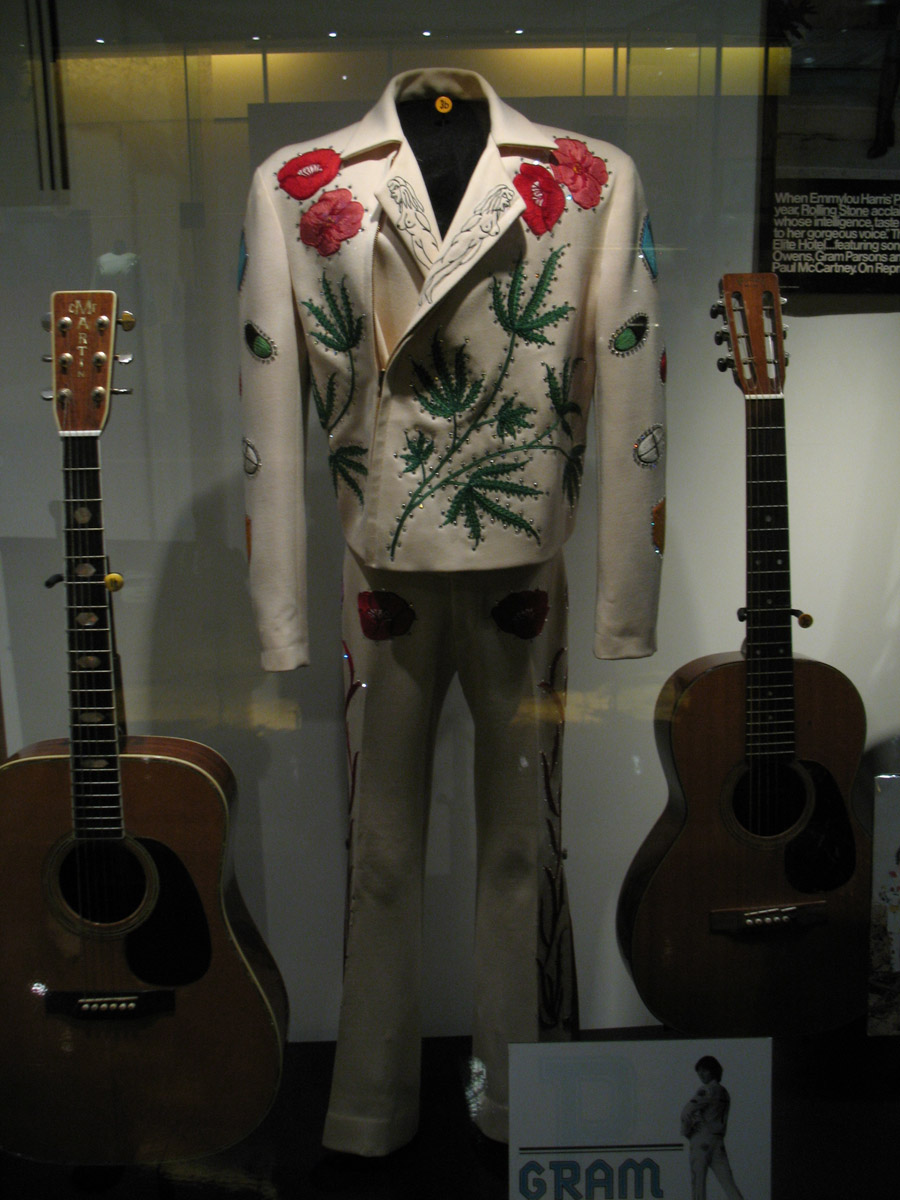
Gram Parsons' Nudie Suit from 1969 on display at the Country Music Hall of Fame in 2008.

Traditionally, Nudie suits are adorned with rhinestones emblazoned throughout the suit jacket and pants, in widely varying custom patterns.

The idea behind the suit's flashy design was for the suit to be as attention getting as possible and make the individual wearing the suit highly visible even from the cheap seats of an arena while performing on stage.

== See also ==
- Nudie Mobiles
- Manuel Cuevas
