= Western wear =

American clothing style associated with the Old West and cowboy culture

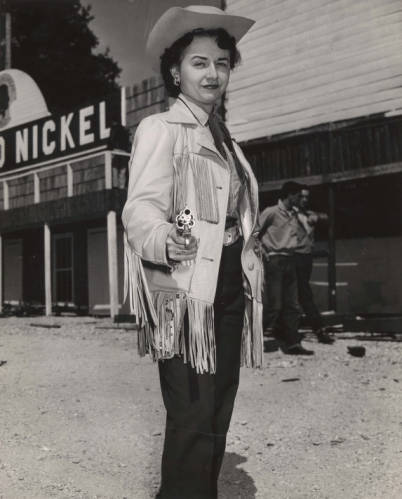
Woman wearing fringe jacket and hat, United States, 1953

Western wear is a category of men's and women's clothing which derives its unique style from the clothes worn in the 19th century Wild West. It ranges from accurate historical reproductions of American frontier clothing to the stylized garments popularized by Western film and television or singing cowboys such as Gene Autry and Roy Rogers in the 1940s and 1950s. It continues to be a prominent style in the West and Southwestern United States, as well as among people associated with country music or Western lifestyles, for example the various Western or Regional Mexican styles. Western wear typically incorporates one or more of the following: Western shirts with pearl snap fasteners and vaquero design accents, blue jeans, cowboy hat, a leather belt, and cowboy boots.

== Hat ==
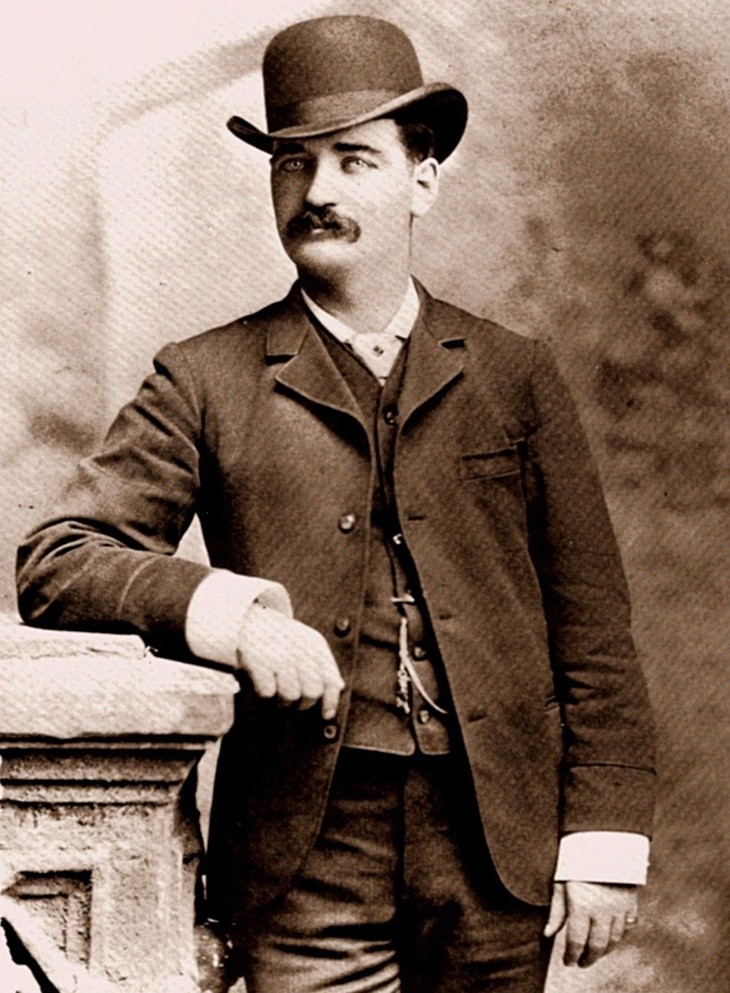
Lawman Bat Masterson wearing a bowler hat. The bowler hat was later replaced by the cowboy hat.

In the early days of the Old West, it was the bowler hat rather than the slouch hat, center crease (derived from the army regulation Hardee hat), or sombrero that was the most popular among cowboys as it was less likely to blow off in the wind. By the 1870s, however, the Stetson had become the most popular cowboy hat due to its use by the Union Cavalry as an alternative to the regulation blue kepi.

Stampede strings were installed to prevent the hat from being blown off when riding at speed. These long strings were usually made from leather or horsehair. Typically, the string was run half-way around the crown of a cowboy hat, and then through a hole on each side with its ends knotted and then secured under the chin or around the back of the head keeping the hat in place in windy conditions or when riding a horse.

The tall white ten gallon hats traditionally worn by movie cowboys were of little use for the historical gunslinger as they made him an easy target, hence the preference of lawmen like Wild Bill Hickok, Wyatt Earp and Bat Masterson for low-crowned black hats.

Originally part of the traditional Plains Indian clothing, coonskin caps were frequently worn by mountain men like Davy Crockett for their warmth and durability. These were revived in the 1950s following the release of a popular Disney movie starring Fess Parker.

== Shirt ==
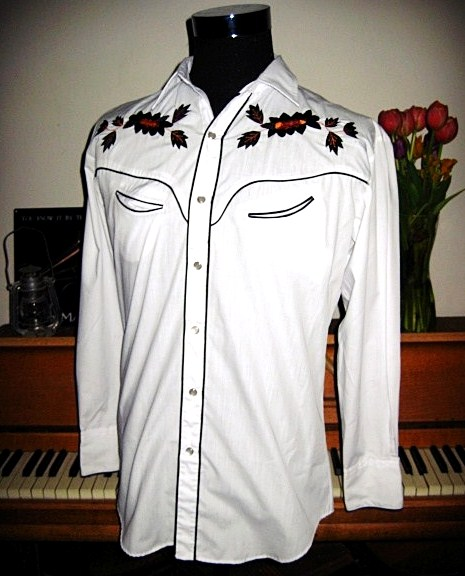
1950s style Western shirt with snap fastenings of the type popularized by singing cowboys

A Western shirt is a traditional item of western wear characterized by a stylized yoke on the front and on the back. It is generally constructed of chambray, denim or tartan fabric with long sleeves, and in modern form is sometimes seen with snap pockets, patches made from bandana fabric, and fringe. The "Wild West" era was during the late Victorian era, hence the direct similarity of fashion.

A Western dress shirt is often elaborately decorated with piping, embroidered roses and a contrasting yoke. In the 1950s these were frequently worn by movie cowboys like Roy Rogers or Clayton Moore's Lone Ranger. Derived from the elaborate Mexican vaquero costumes like the guayabera, these were worn at rodeos so the cowboy could be easily identifiable. Buffalo Bill was known to wear them with a buckskin fringe jacket during his Wild West shows.

Another common type of Western shirt is the shield-front shirt (also called a bib shirt))worn by many US Cavalry troopers during the American Civil War but originally derived from a red shirt issued to prewar firefighters. The cavalry shirt was made of blue wool with yellow piping and brass buttons and was invented by the flamboyant George Armstrong Custer. In recent times this shield-front shirt was popularised by John Wayne in Fort Apache and was also worn by rockabilly musicians like the Stray Cats.

In 1946, Papa Jack Weil put snap buttons on the front, and pocket flaps on the Western shirt, and established Denver's Rockmount Ranch Wear. Other early Western wear labels included California-based H Bar C, and Panhandle Slim, from Westmoor Manufacturing, which migrated from Minneapolis, to Omaha, and finally in 1975 to Fort Worth, Texas.

Western shirts have been a staple of the American West and fashionable with young men since the 1960s and 1970s. A GQ writer in 2012 noted "vintage washed out westerns from the '70s becoming coveted items."

== Coat ==
When a jacket is required there is a wide choice available for both linedancers and historical re-enactors. Cowboy coats originated from charro suits and were passed down to the vaqueros who later introduced it to the American cowboys. These include frock coats, ponchos popularised by Clint Eastwood's Spaghetti Westerns, short Mexican jackets with silver embroidery, fringe jackets popular among outlaw country, southern rock and 1980s heavy metal bands, and duster coats derived from originals worn in the Wild West. More modern interpretations include leather waistcoats inspired by the biker subculture and jackets with a design imitating the piebald color of a cow. Women may wear bolero jackets derived from the Civil War era zouave uniforms, shawls, denim jackets in a color matching their skirt or dress, or a fringe jacket like Annie Oakley.

For more formal occasions inhabitants of the West might opt for a suit with "smile" pockets, piping and a yoke similar to that on the Western shirts. This can take the form of an Ike jacket, leisure suit or three-button sportcoat. Country and Western singer Johnny Cash was known to wear an all-black Western suit, in contrast to the elaborate Nudie suits worn by stars like Elvis Presley and Porter Wagoner. The most elaborate western wear is the custom work created by rodeo tailors such as Nudie Cohn and Manuel, which is characterized by elaborate embroidery and rhinestone decoration. This type of western wear, popularized by country music performers, is the origin of the phrase rhinestone cowboy.

== Trousers ==
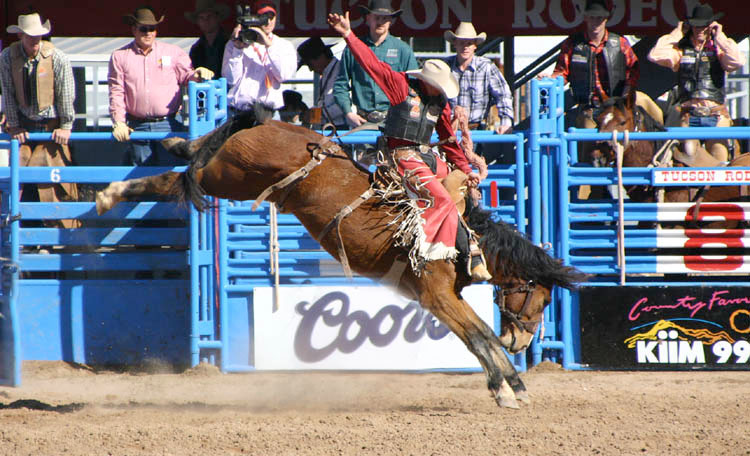
Cowboy wearing leather chaps at a rodeo

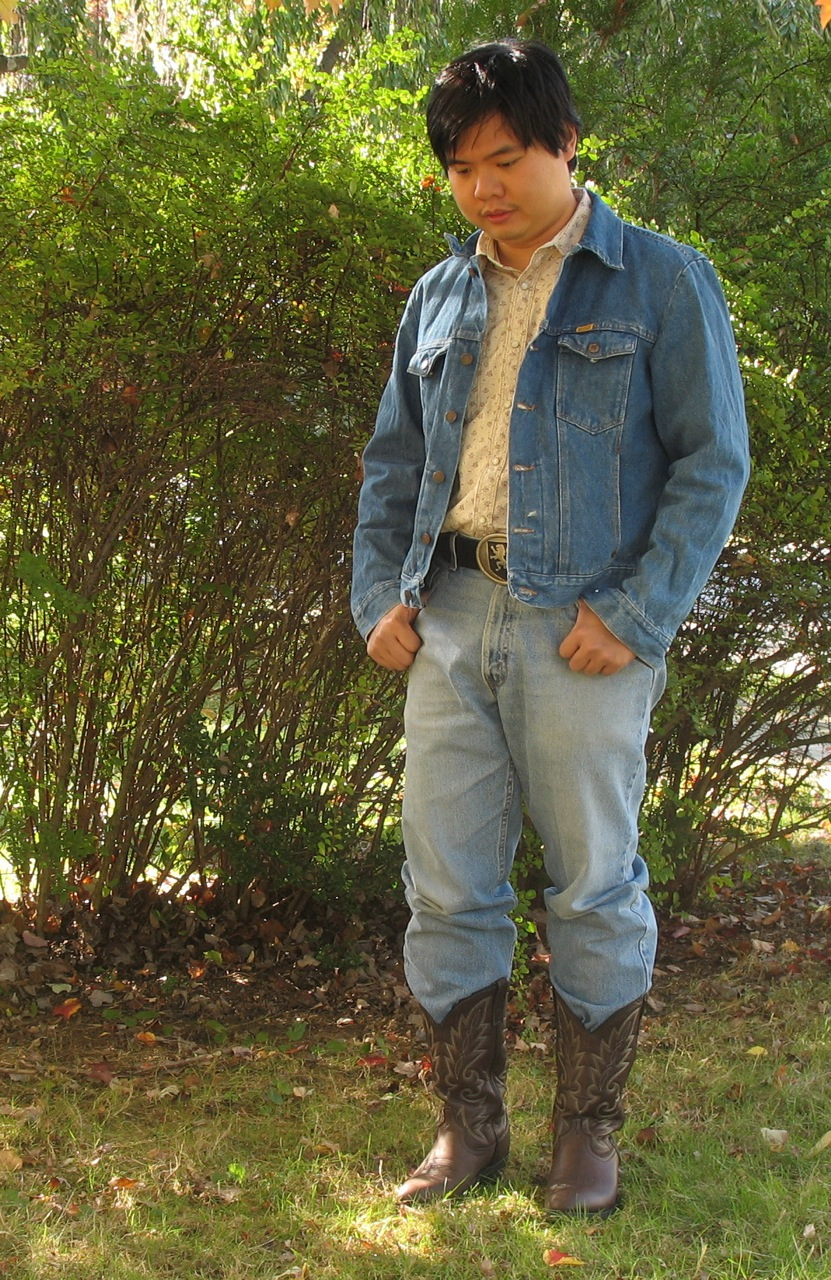
A Texas tuxedo comprising a denim jacket, boots and jeans.

In the early days of the Wild West trousers were made out of wool. In summer canvas was sometimes used. This changed during the Gold Rush of the 1840s when denim overalls became popular among miners for their cheapness and breathability. Levi Strauss improved the design by adding copper rivets and by the 1870s this design was adopted by ranchers and cowboys. The original Levi's jeans were soon followed by other makers including Wrangler jeans and Lee Cooper. These were frequently accessorised with kippy belts featuring metal conchos and large belt buckles.

Leather chaps were often worn to protect the cowboy's legs from cactus spines and prevent the fabric from wearing out. Two common types include the skintight shotgun chaps and wide batwing chaps. The latter were sometimes made from hides retaining their hair (known as "woolies") rather than tanned leather. They appeared on the Great Plains somewhere around 1887.

Women wore knee-length prairie skirts, red or blue gingham dresses or suede fringed skirts derived from Native American dress. Saloon girls wore short red dresses with corsets, garter belts and stockings. After World War II, many women, returning to the home after working in the fields or factories while the men were overseas, began to wear jeans like the men.

== Neckwear ==
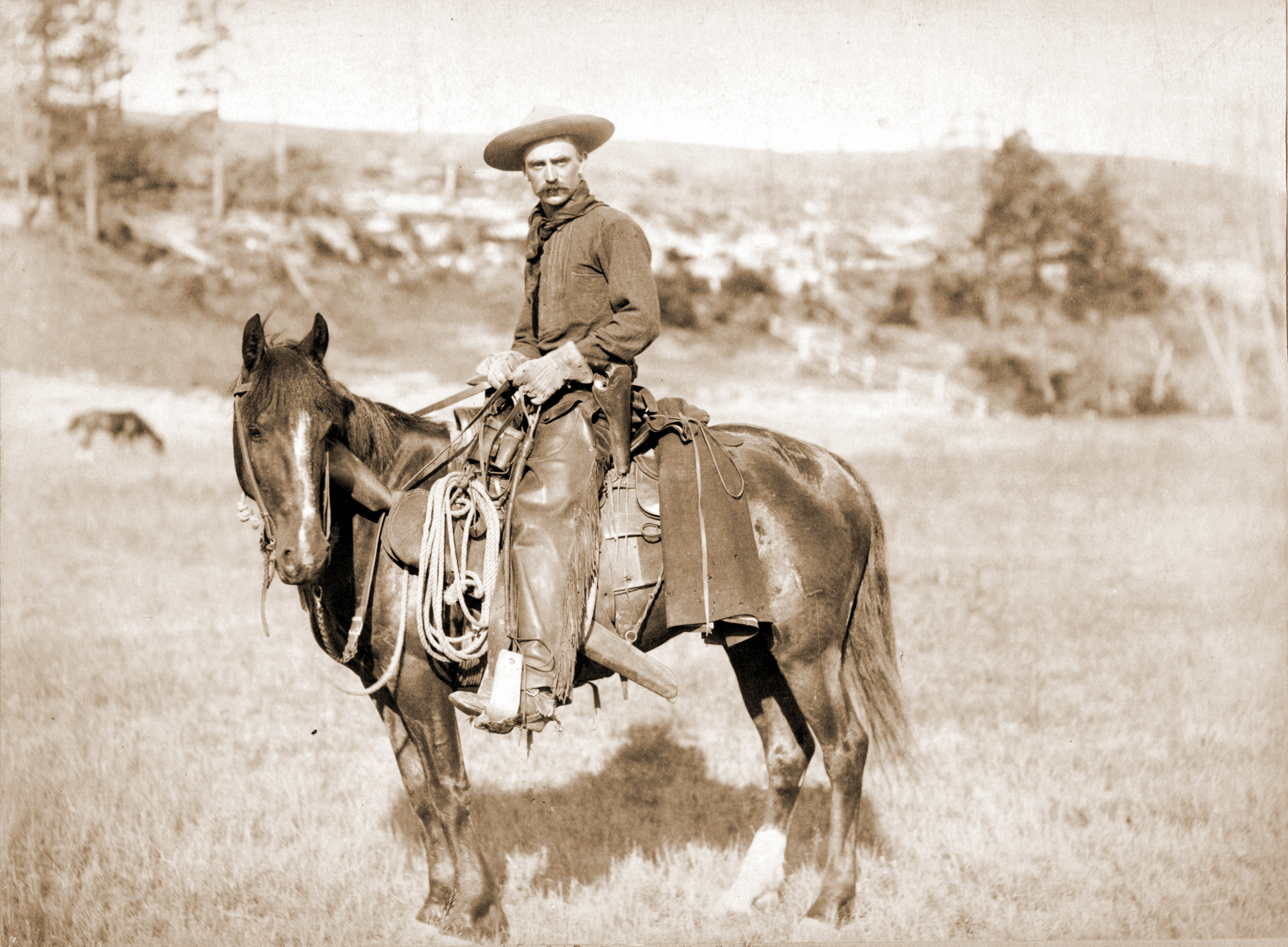
Working cowboy wearing a bandana or "wild rag," 1880s

During the Victorian era, gentlemen would wear silk cravats or neckties to add color to their otherwise sober black or grey attire. These continued to be worn by respectable Westerners until the early 20th century. Following the Civil War it became common practice among working class veterans to loosely tie a bandana around their necks to absorb sweat and keep the dust out of their faces. This practise originated in the Mexican War era regular army when troops threw away the hated leather stocks (a type of collar issued to soldiers) and replaced them with cheap paisley kerchiefs.

Another well-known Western accessory, the bolo tie, was a pioneer invention reputedly made from an expensive hatband. This was a favorite for gamblers and was quickly adopted by Mexican charros, together with the slim "Kentucky" style bowtie commonly seen on stereotypical Southern gentlemen like Colonel Sanders or Boss Hogg. In modern times it serves as formal wear in many western states, notably Montana, New Mexico and Texas.

== Image gallery ==
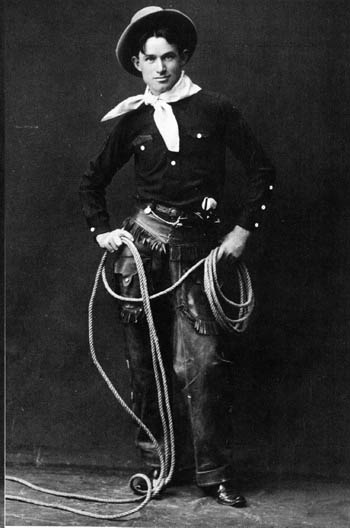
Will Rogers's western wear would inspire the clothing of the singing cowboys of the 1940s

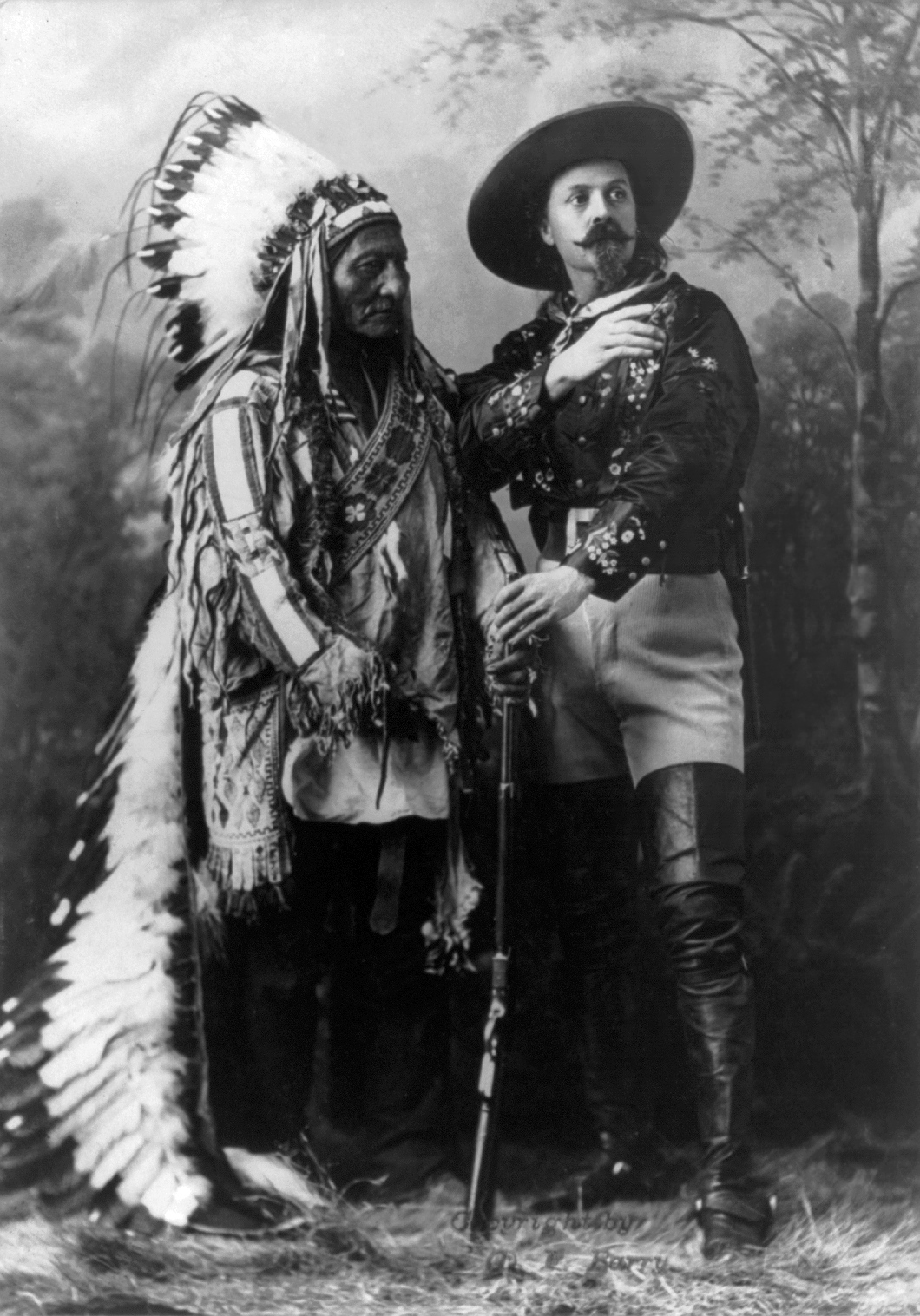
Early use of the embroidered Western shirt by Buffalo Bill

A typical western shirt has mother of pearl snap fasteners, two breast pockets, and a v-shaped motif.

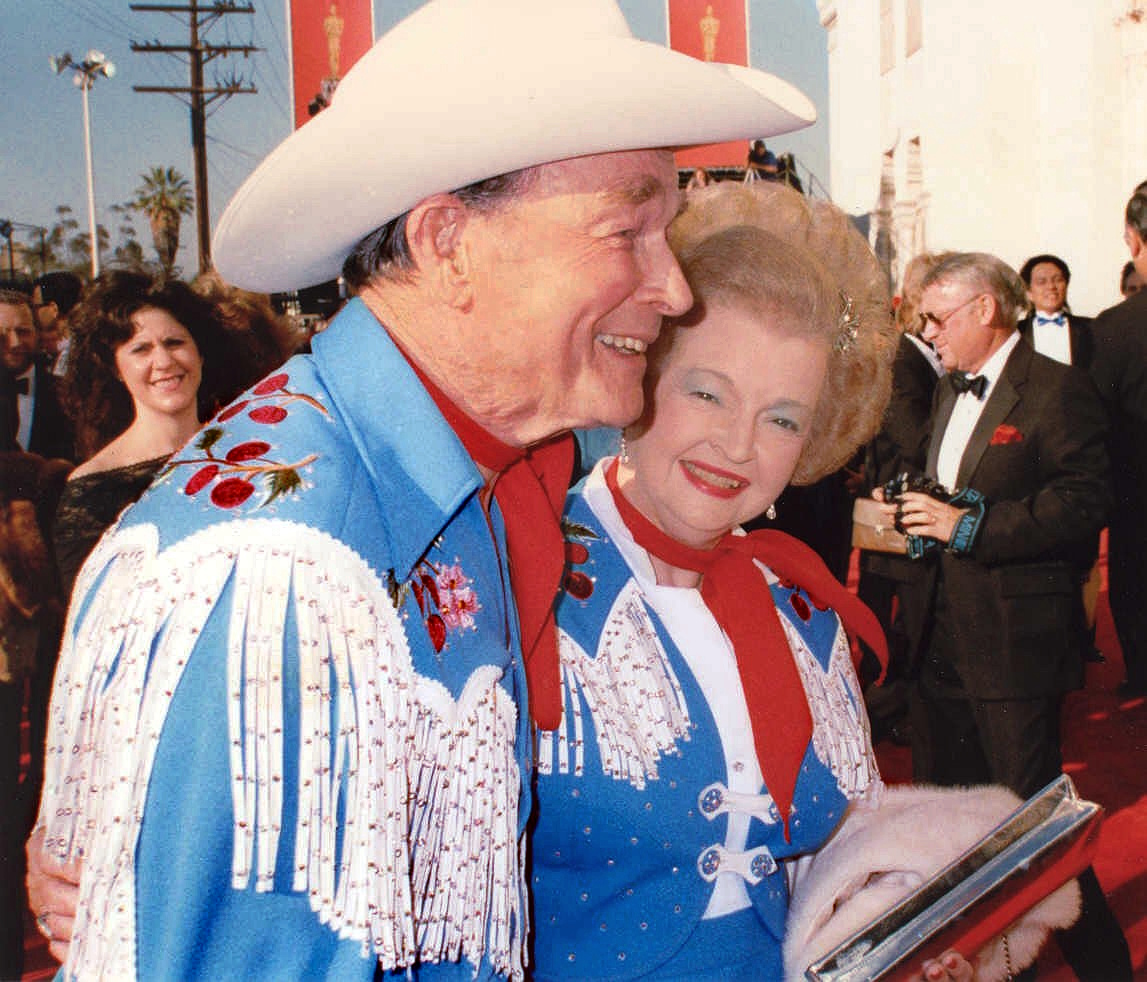
Roy Rogers in fringed Western shirt and Dale Evans in matching fringe jacket

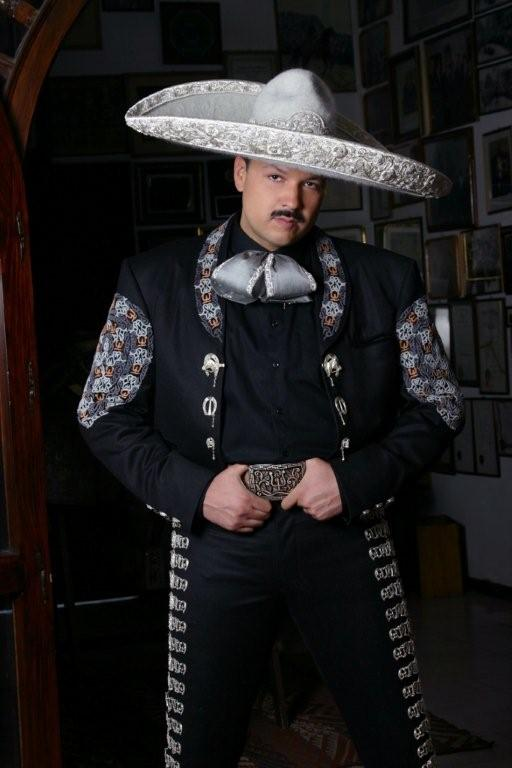
Mariachi singer wearing silver embroidered charro outfit

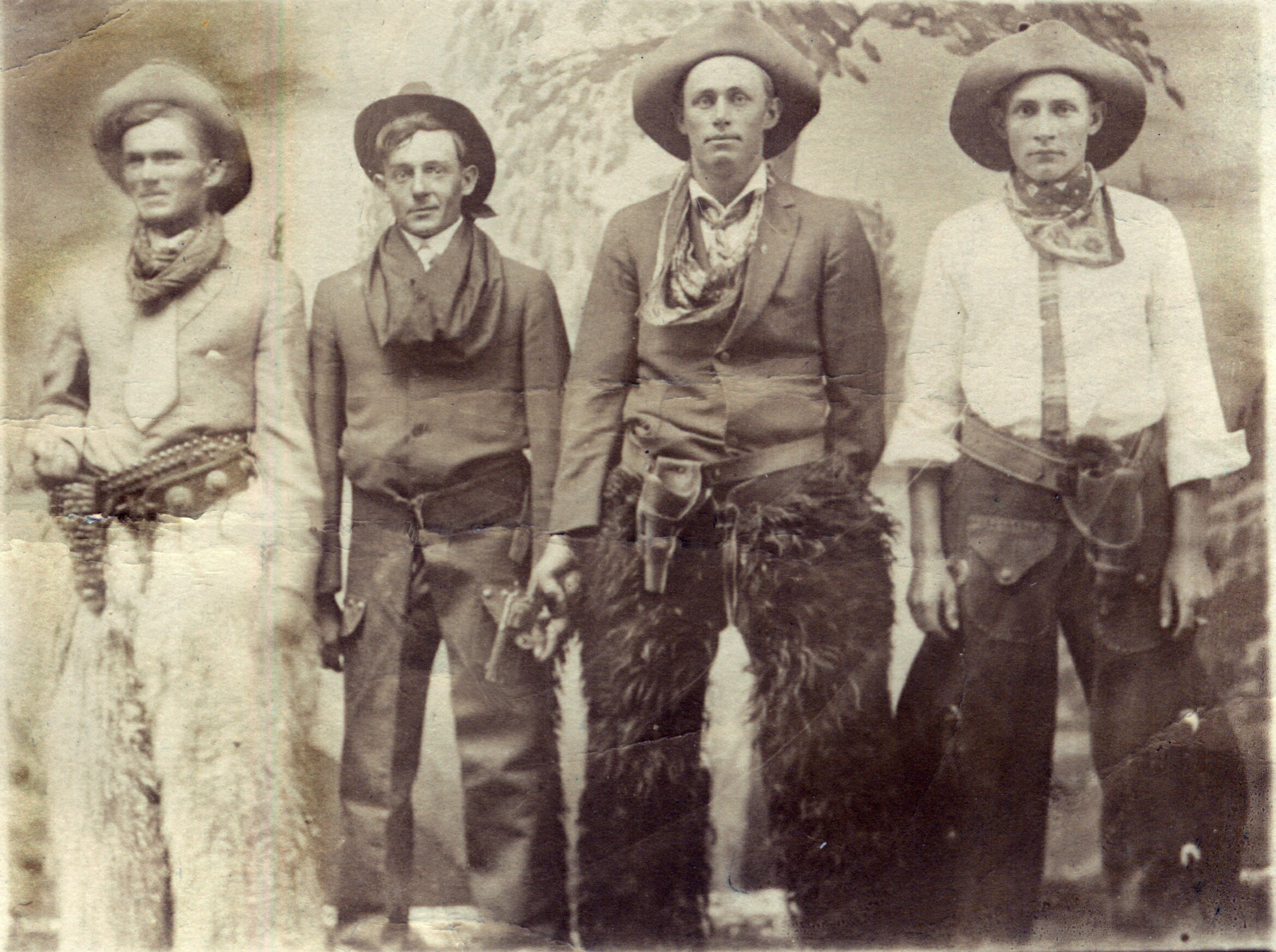
A group of "dudes" posing in chaps and stetsons, c.1910

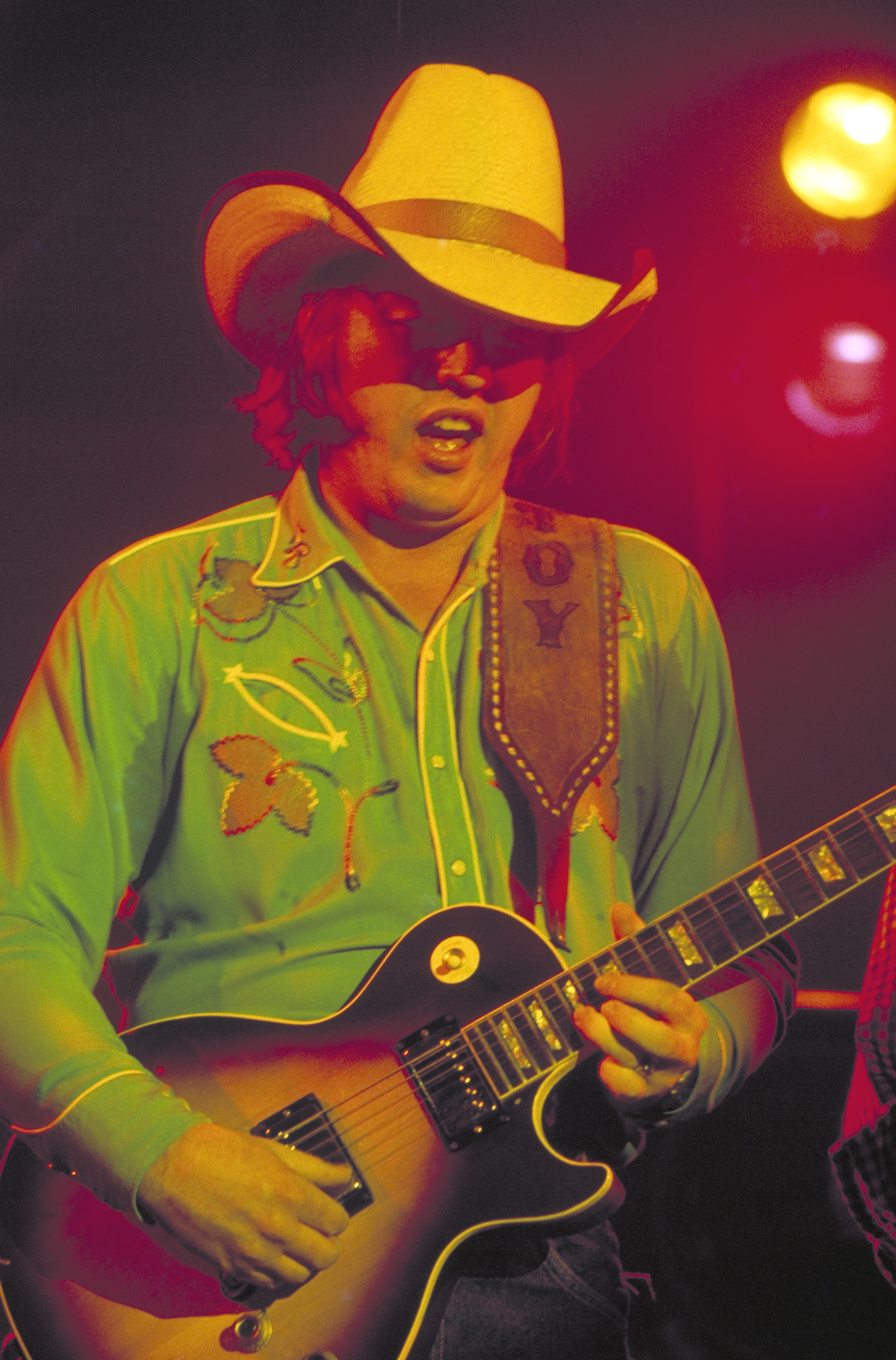
Example of the garish Western shirts popular in the 1970s and among the modern-day indie rock scene

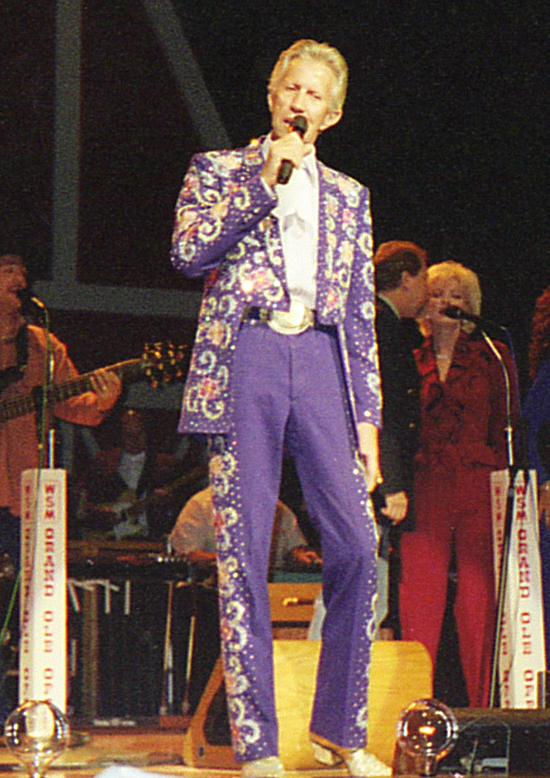
Porter Wagoner wearing elaborate Nudie suit

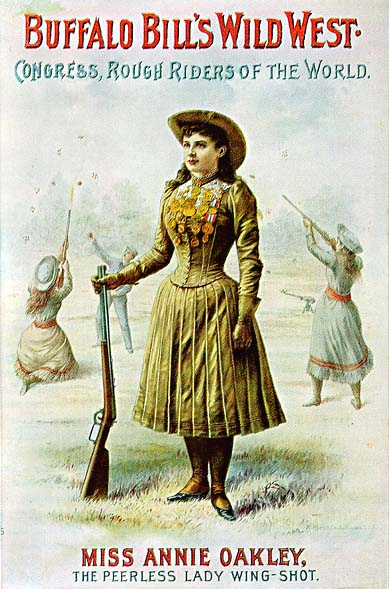
Annie Oakley wearing a prairie skirt

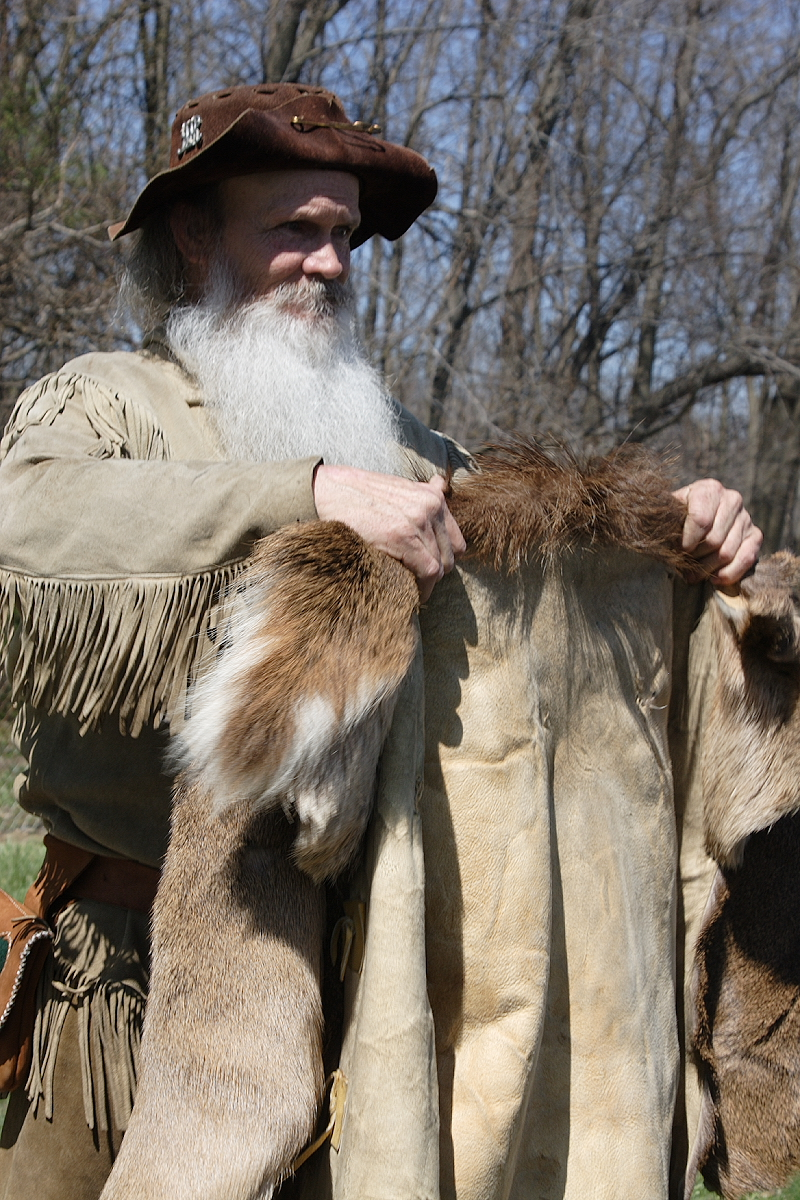
Authentic historical reenactor in buckskins

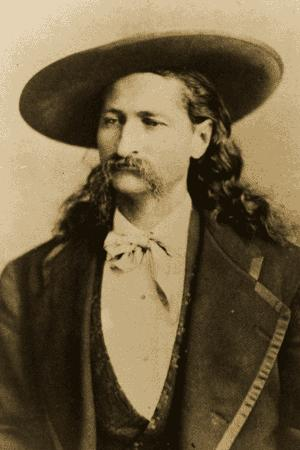
Wild Bill wearing sombrero and frock coat

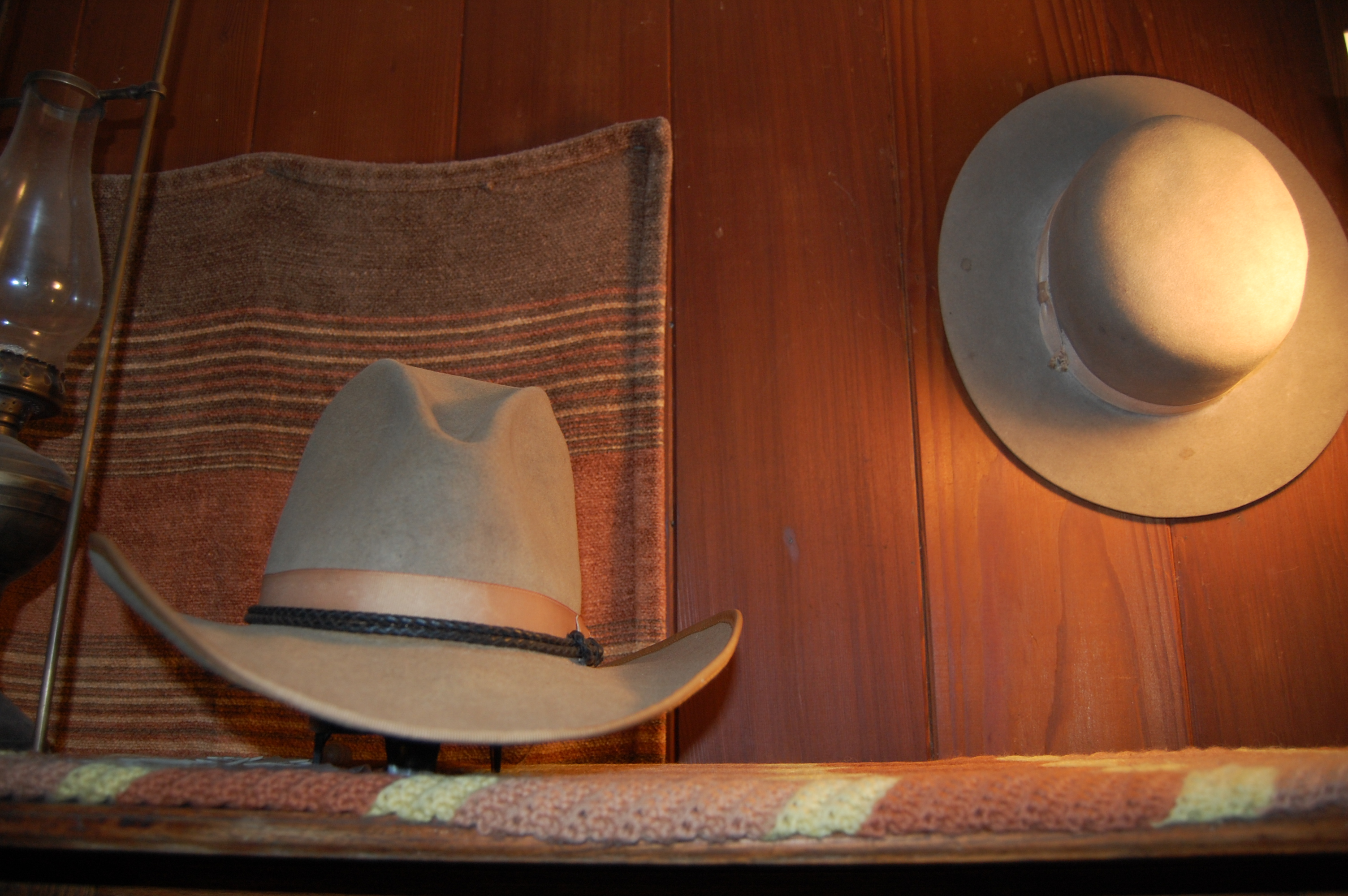
Authentic Stetsons from the 1880s

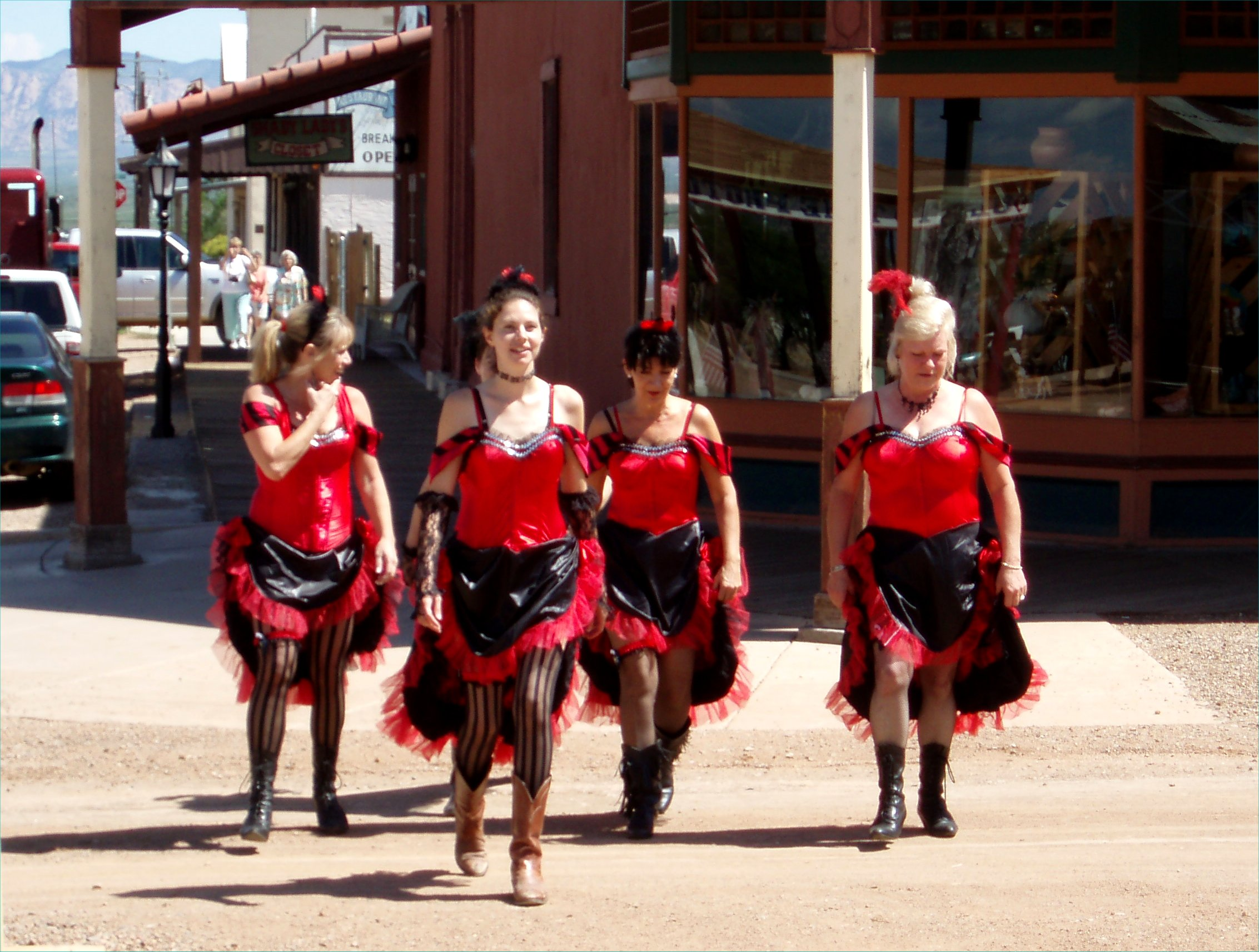
Modern re-enactors dressed as saloon girls

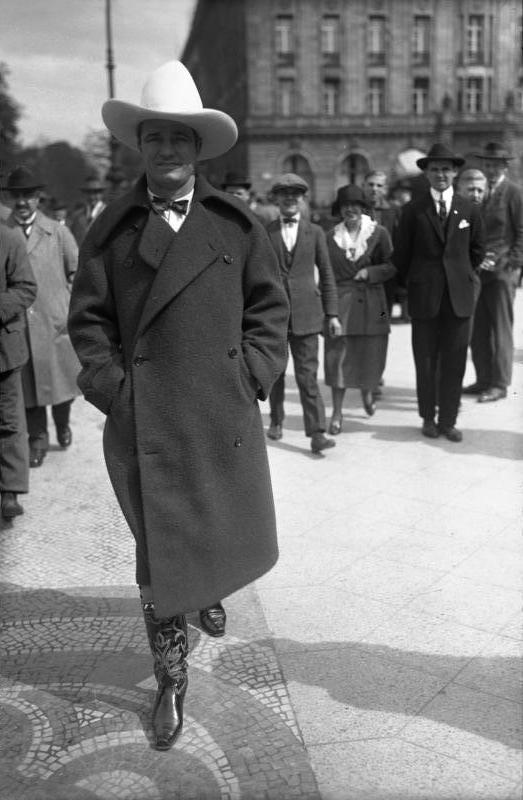
Tom Mix in Ten Gallon Hat

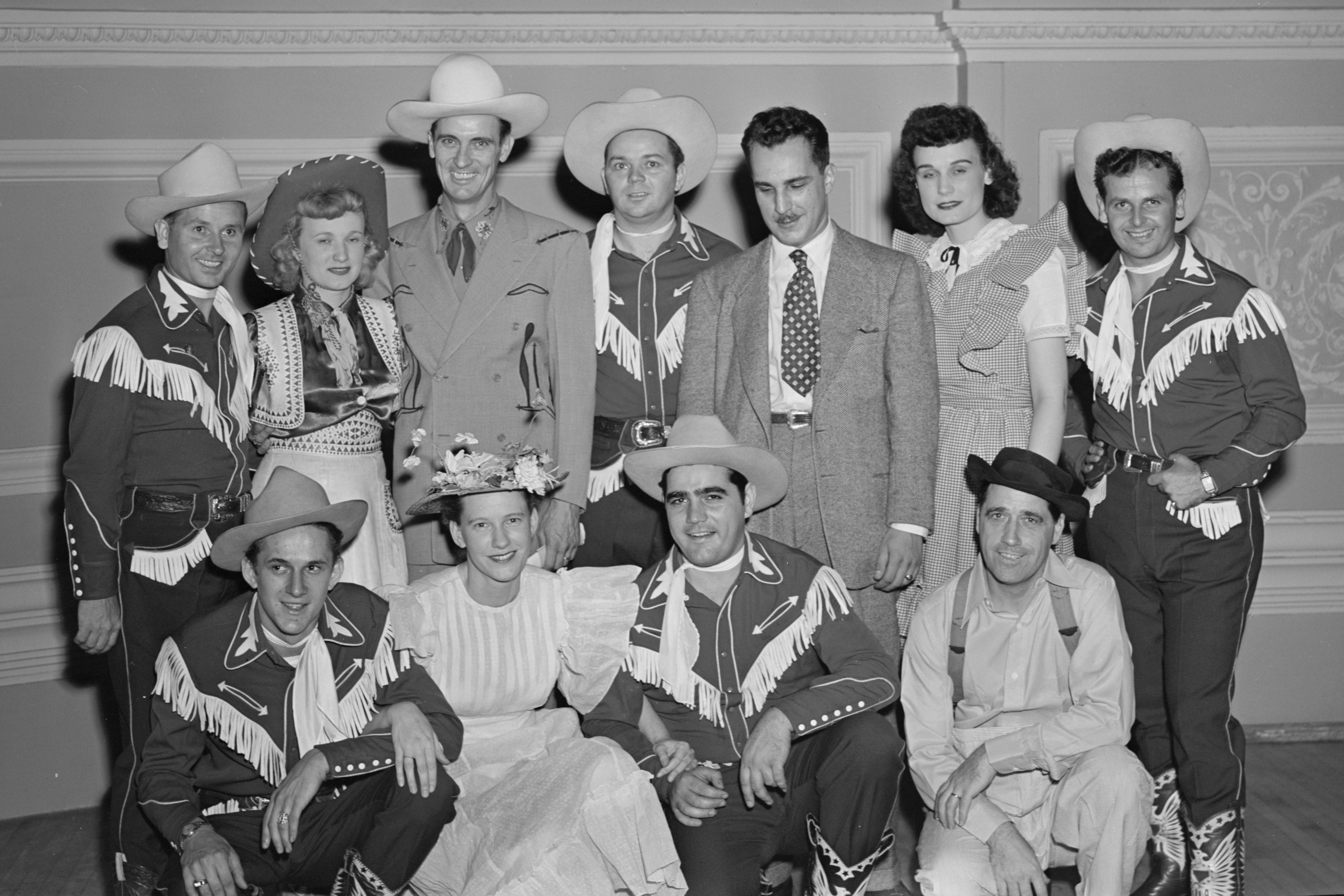
Ernest Tubb (third from left) in Western suit

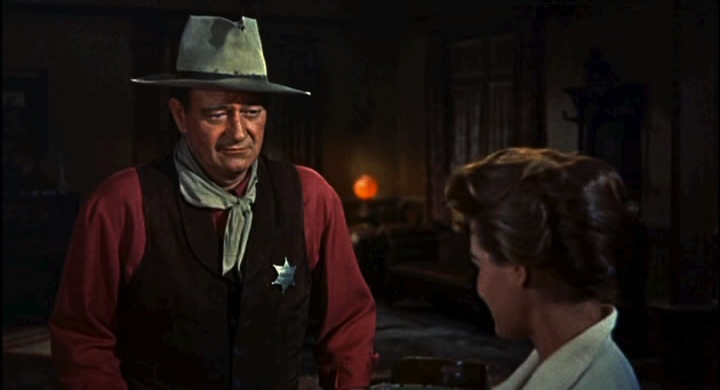
John Wayne in battered slouch hat and more authentic costume

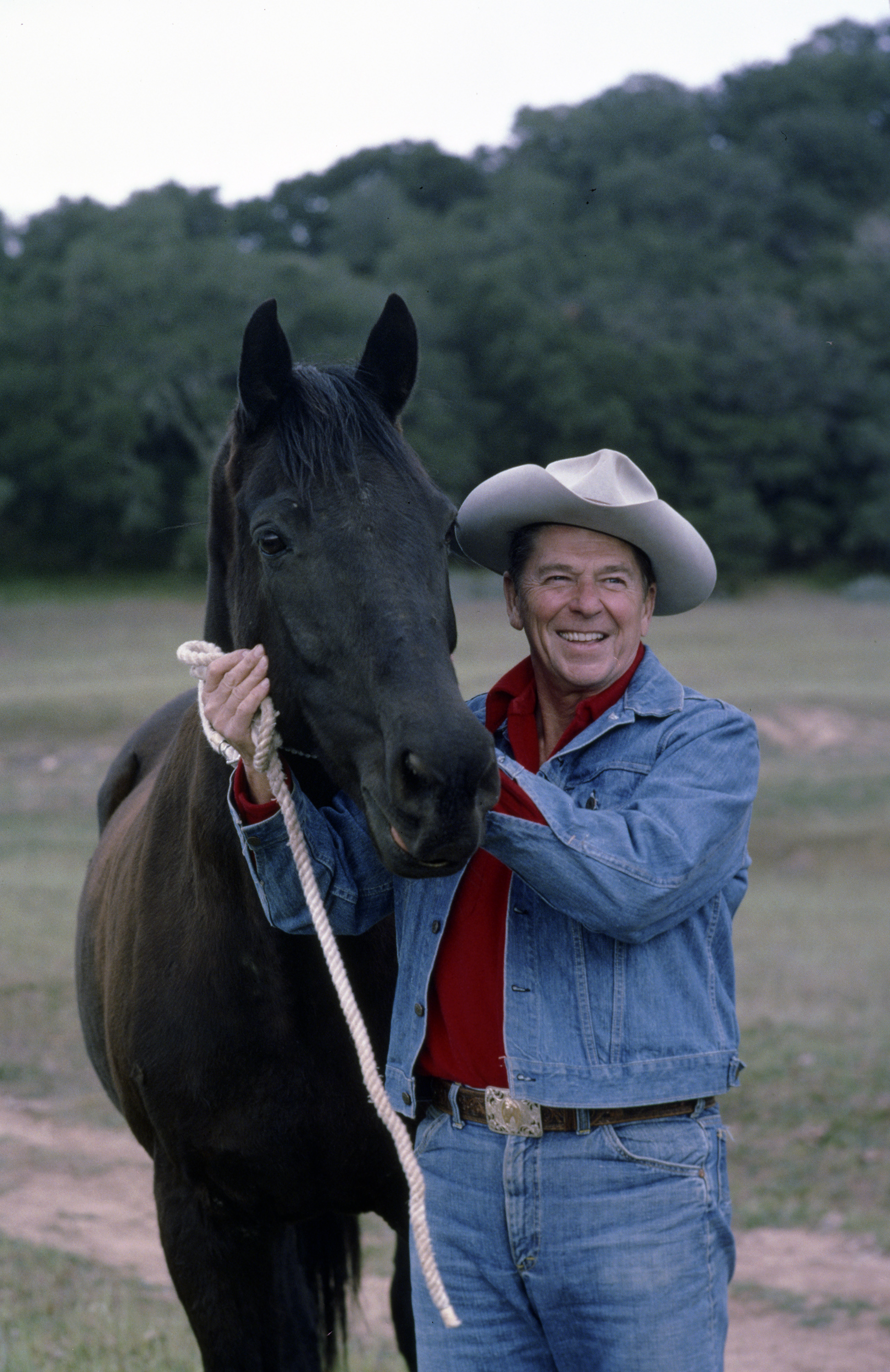
President Reagan wearing stonewashed denim jacket and jeans

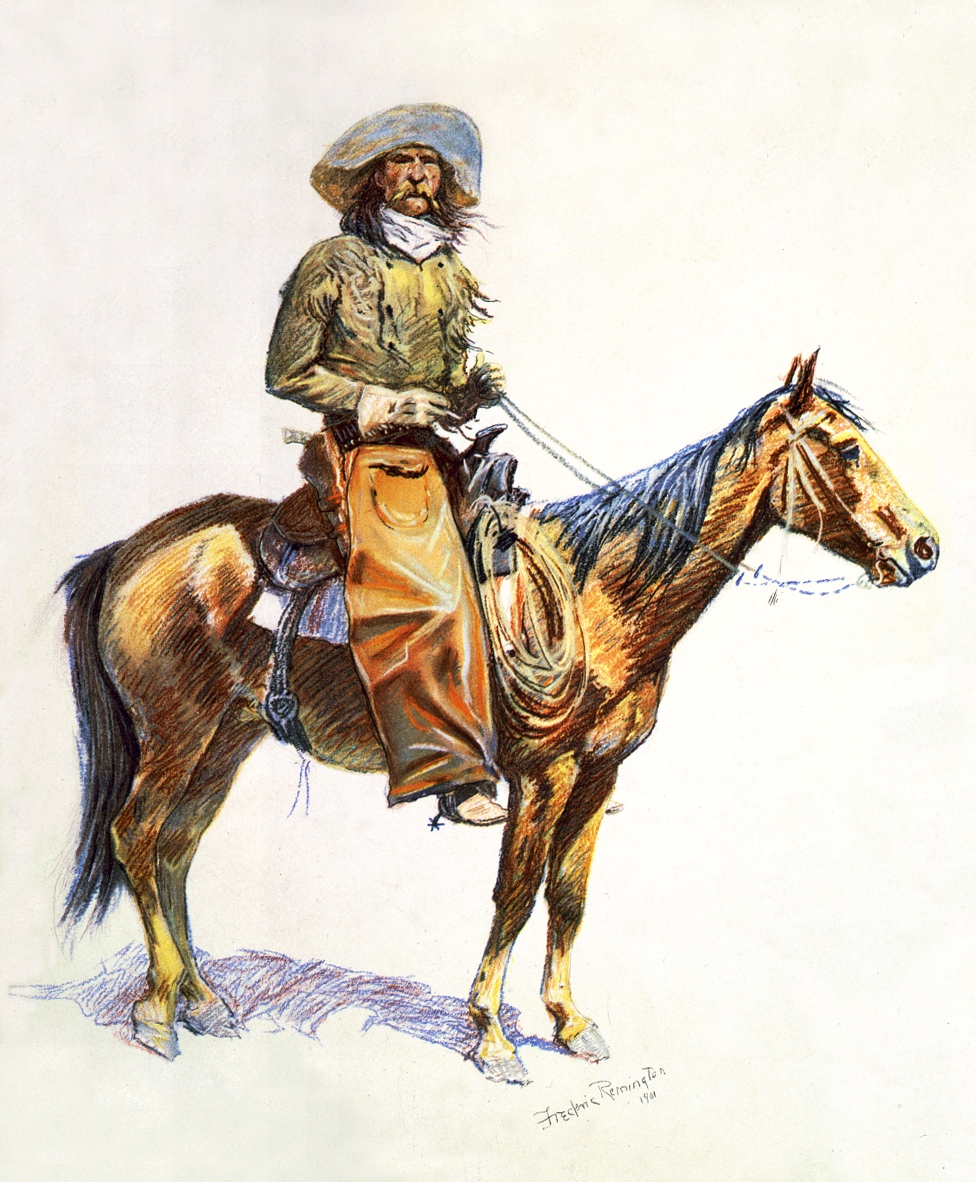
Arizona cowboy wearing a "John Wayne" style Western shirt

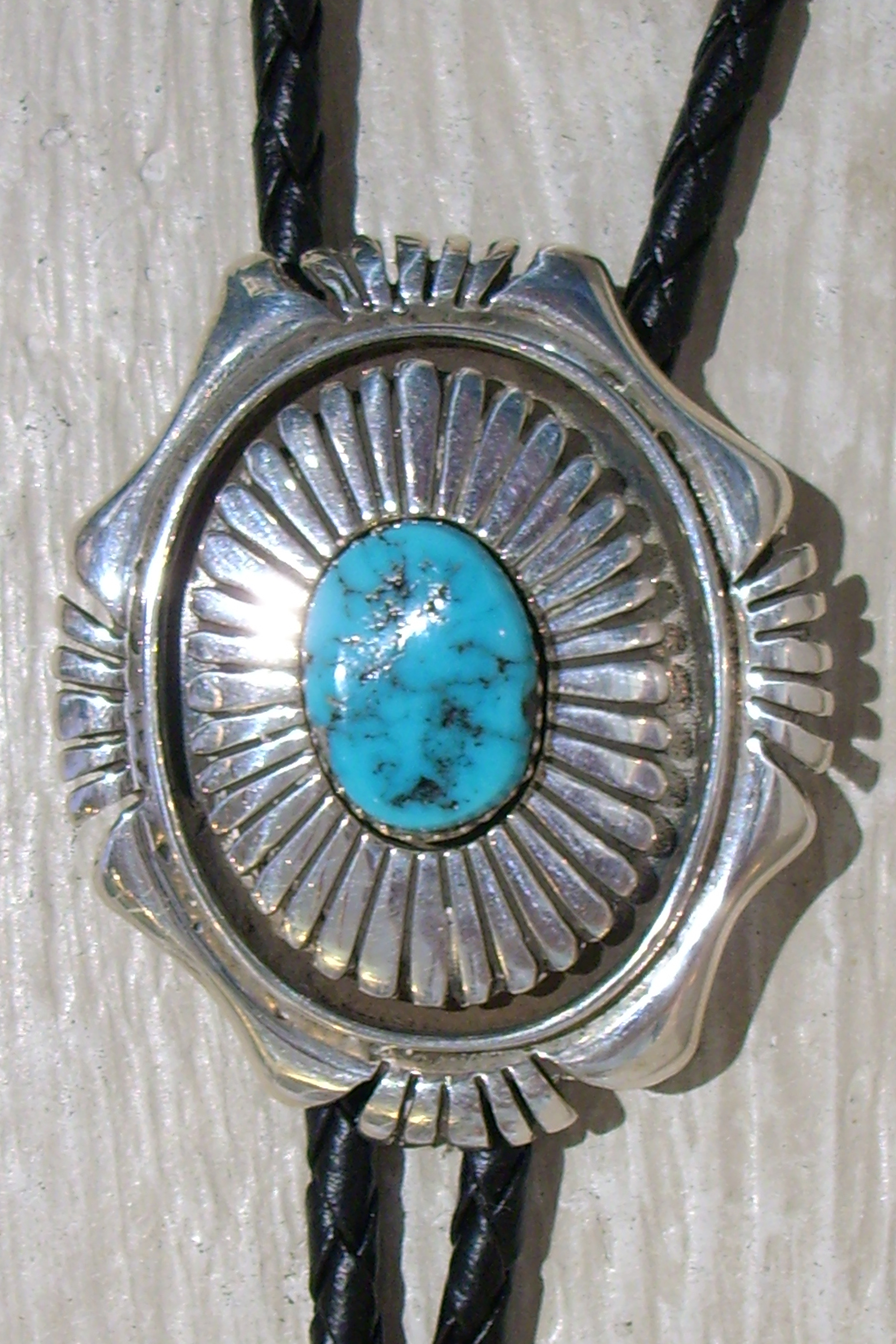
Navajo bolo tie made from turquoise and silver

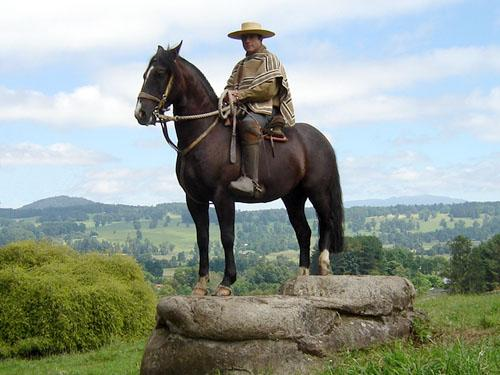
Poncho still worn by modern-day working Huasos
