= Prairie dress =

Skirt with one or more deep flounces, loosely inspired by 1830s styles

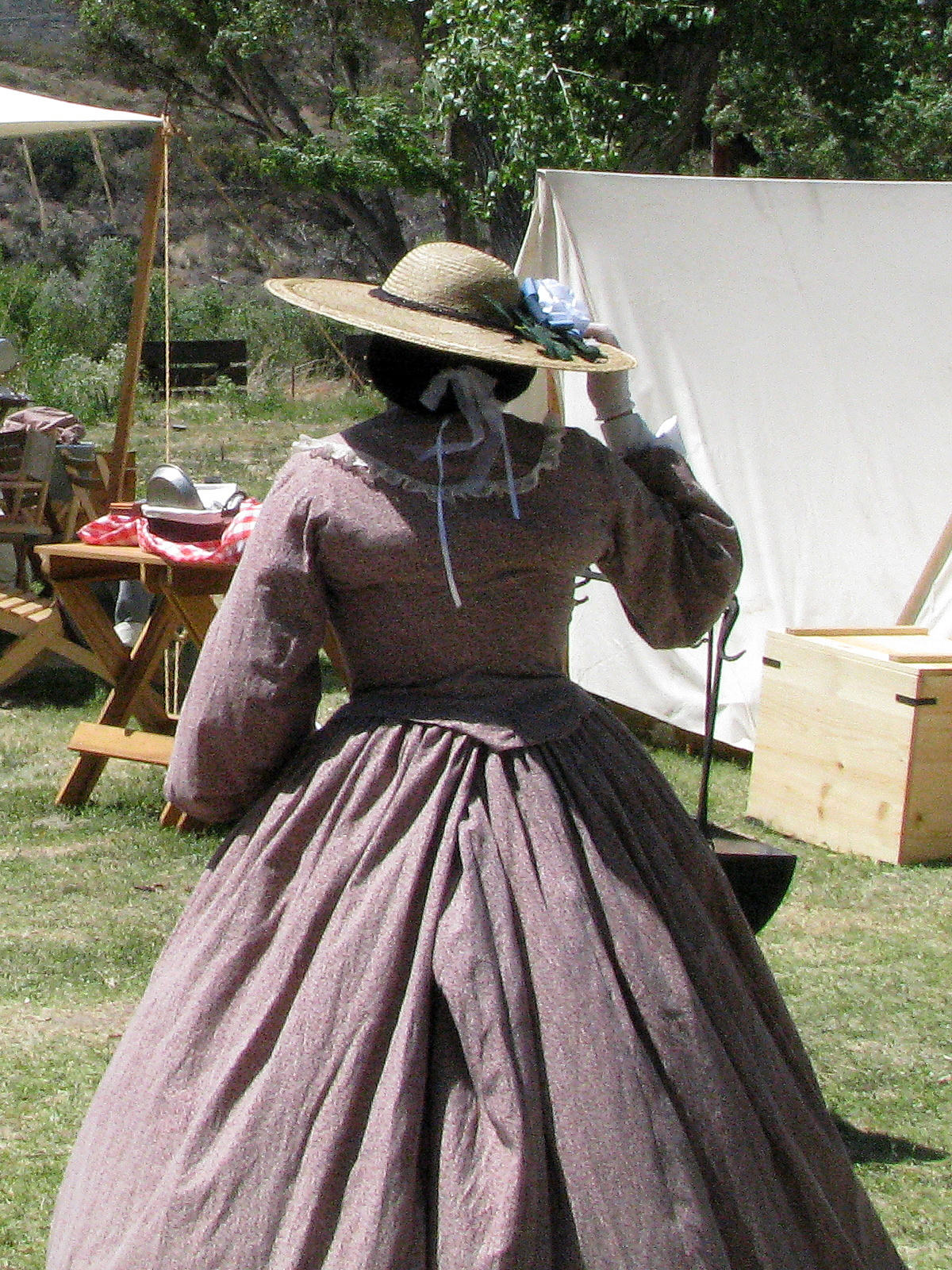
A prairie skirt worn as part of an American Civil War reenactment

A prairie dress or prairie skirt is a modest American style of skirt, an article of women's and girls' clothing.

Prairie dresses may be straight to slightly flared to very full, and may have one or more flounces (deep ruffles) or tiers; prairie dresses may be worn over a ruffled eyelet or lace-trimmed petticoat. Traditionally, prairie dresses have long sleeves. In keeping with their design inspiration, traditional prairie skirts are usually made of "country" fabrics such as denim and flowered calico, though they can be of a solid colour too. Prairie skirts are a staple of women's western wear, and very full prairie skirts are worn for square dancing. Prairie dresses are often worn by women who attend Christian churches that emphasize the practice of plain dress (as with the Bruderhof Communities) or the doctrine of outward holiness (as with the Allegheny Wesleyan Methodist Connection). They are seen as fashionable, especially in cold weather.

Prairie dresses earned their name for people travelling to the Western parts of the United States, though they were once "worn by women of all classes all over the country."

== Origins in the 19th century ==
Prairie skirts are so-called after their resemblance to the home-sewn skirts worn by pioneer women in the mid-19th century, which in turn are a simplified version of the flared, ruffled skirts characteristic of high-fashion dresses of the 1820s. The style originated as an adaptation of high fashion to the practicalities of rural life in the Western United States. Deep colors and prints were used as they did not show dirt, while decorations were used to update clothing to changing fashions.

== Revival in the 1960s and 1970s ==
Counterculture Hippies rejecting mainstream fashion looking instead to historical and non-Western styles. While 19th century prairie clothing was usually homemade, new companies such as Gunne Sax in San Francisco began manufacturing ready to wear prairie clothing. The style grew in popularity in the 1970s with the approach of the United States Bicentennial and was introduced to high fashion by Ralph Lauren in his fall 1978 Western-themed collection.

Mid-calf length, button-front denim prairie skirts with a single flounce, worn with a 1950s-style petticoat that was slightly longer than the skirt, became a mainstream fashion in the 1970s and early 1980s following Lauren's introduction.

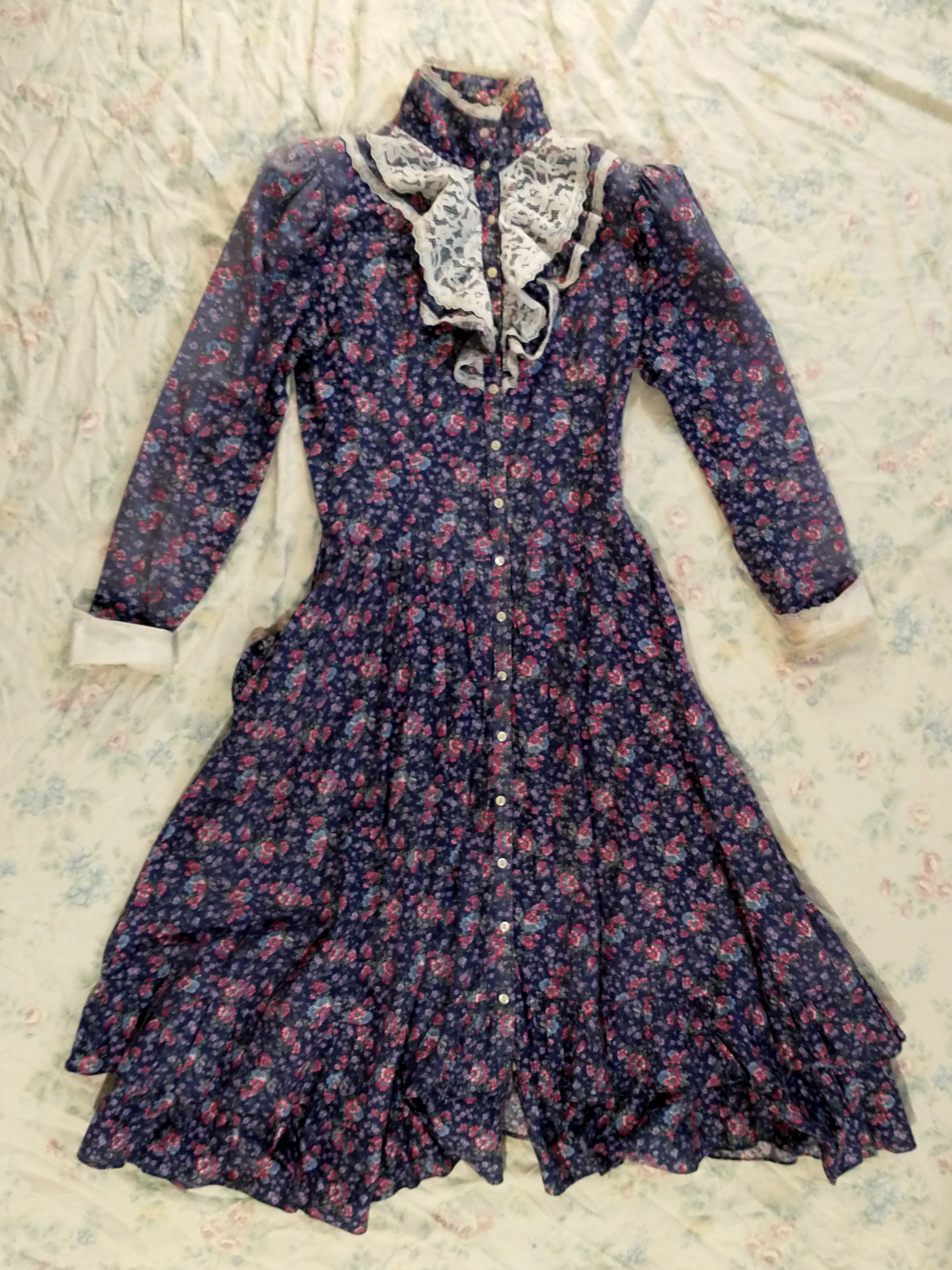
Late 1970s prairie dress

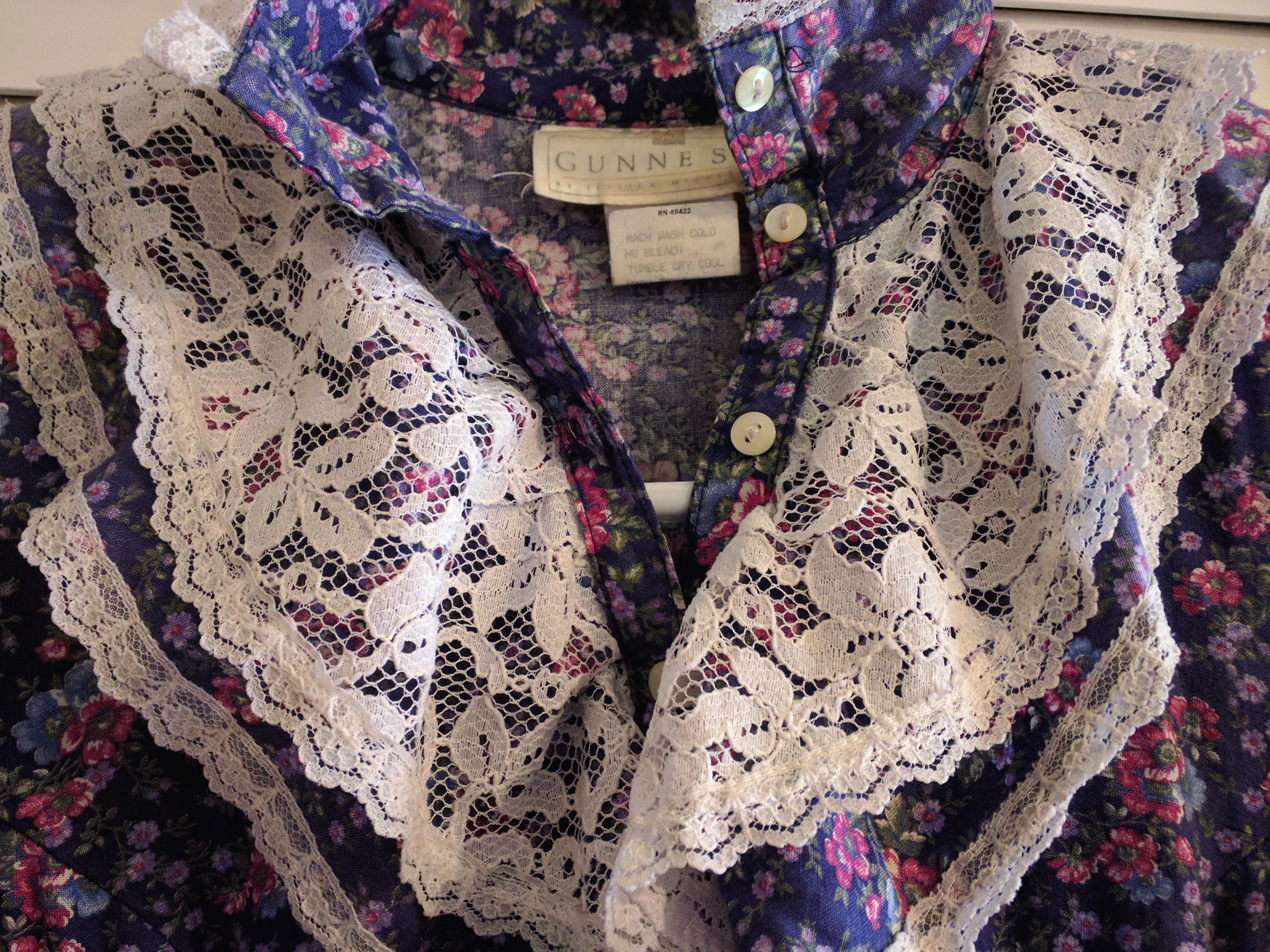
Collar of a 1970s prairie dress, showing common parts of the style such as lace, buttons, floral fabric, and ruffles.

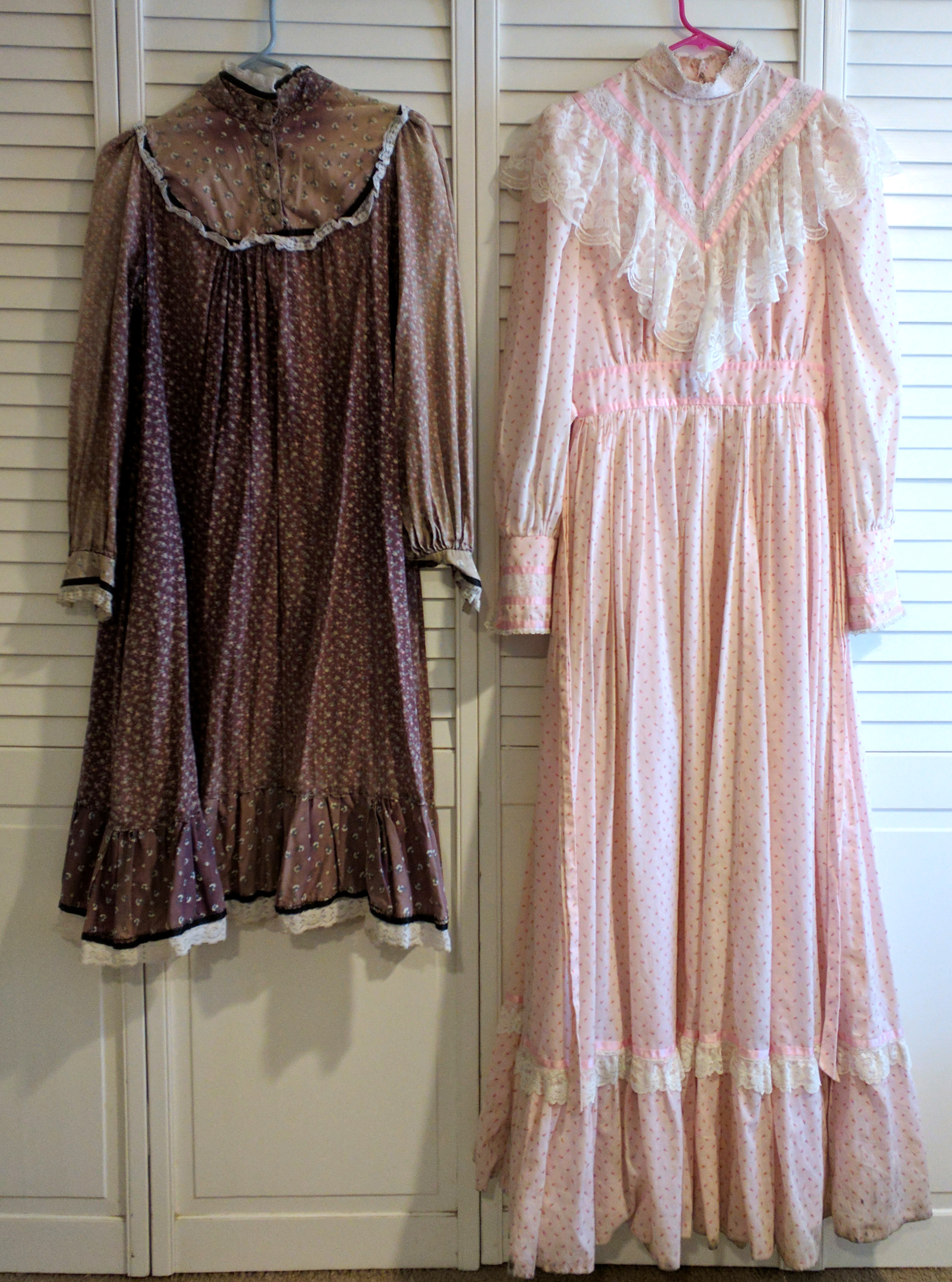
1970s prairie dresses

== 21st century ==
Prairie dresses were a fashion trend in the late 2010s, and were part of the cottagecore trend in 2020.

Prairie dresses are often worn by women who attend Christian churches that emphasize the practice of plain dress (as with the Bruderhof Communities, an Anabaptist denomination) or the doctrine of outward holiness (as with the Evangelical Wesleyan Church, a Methodist connexion in the holiness movement).

== See also ==
- Cape dress
- Christian headcovering
- Denim skirt
- Outward holiness
- Plain people
- Western wear
