= Georg Friedrich Strass =

Alsatian jeweler (1701–1773)

- Born: 29 May 1701; Wolfisheim bei Strasbourg
- Died: 22 December 1773 (aged 72)
- Other names: Georges Frédéric Strass
- Occupation: jeweler
- Known for: Inventor of the rhinestone (aka strass)

Georg Friedrich Strass (French: Georges Frédéric Strass; 29 May 1701, Wolfisheim near Strasbourg – 22 December 1773) was a jeweler and inventor of imitation gemstones from Alsace. He is best known as the inventor of the rhinestone, called strass in many European languages, from a particular type of crystal he found in the river Rhine.

He used mixtures of bismuth and thallium to improve the refractive quality of his imitations, and altered their colors with metal salts. The imitations were, in his view, so similar to real gems that he invented the concept of the "simulated gemstone" to describe them. He considerably improved his gems' brilliance by gluing metal foil behind them. This foil was later replaced with a vapor-deposited mirror coating.

Strass opened his own business in 1730, and devoted himself wholly to the development of imitation diamonds. Due to his great achievements, he was awarded the title "King's Jeweler" in 1734.

He was a partner in the jewellery business of Madame Prévot. He continued improving his artificial gemstones during this time. His work was in great demand at the court of King Louis XV of France, and he controlled a large market for artificial gems.

Wealthy through his businesses, he was able to retire comfortably at age 52.
