= Nudie Mobiles =

Vehicles customized by the designer Nudie Cohn

Nudie Mobiles are vehicles customized by the designer Nudie Cohn. He was known for designing rhinestone-covered outfits worn by celebrities such as Elvis Presley and Johnny Cash. Between 1950 and 1975, he customized 18 automobiles with added animal horns, silver dollars, chromed horseshoes, and firearm embellishments. The fanciness or garishness increased with each successive car.

== History ==
After Nudie became successful by making outfits for county singers, he purchased a new 1950 Hudson convertible. This became the first "Nudie Mobile" when he customized it by adding steer horns to the front end of the white convertible. He also had a sign on it for his "Nudie's Rodeo Tailors" store that was located in North Hollywood near the Universal Film Studios.

Nudie would decorate the cars with various objects to make them "stand out." Once the Nudie customs attracted attention, General Motors provided Nudie with cars. Nudie modified Pontiac, Buick, and Cadillac convertibles with typical Nudie icons, such as silver-dollar-studded dashboards, pistol door handles, and longhorn steer horns as hood ornaments. Several of the cars were pictured in Nudie's Online Car Museum.

Webb Pierce purchased several Nudie mobiles, including a 1962 Pontiac convertible. The interior of his car with Webb Pierce standing by the open driver's door is on the cover of the Cross Country album.

A 1963 Pontiac Bonneville customized by Nudie with hand-tooled leather with over 300 silver dollars on every surface, including the floor, doors, and dash, as well as leather seats, steering wheel, and even seat belts replaced with hand-tooled cowboy belts. A longhorn is ahead of the grille, a continental kit with rifles on the rear fenders, a saddle between the front bucket seats for a third passenger, as well as a total of 14 guns to operate the door handles, transmission, horn, and emergency brake. The car was purchased by Roy Rogers in 1984, for $4,000.

Elvis Presley almost got himself a Nudie mobile, "In 1972, Nudie made a [customized] car for Elvis 'cause Elvis thought, Well I've got to have that in my collection'...but his manager would not let Nudie get close to Elvis."

Two cars, a 1975 Cadillac Eldorado convertible and a 1964 Pontiac Safari station wagon, remained in the family and are at the Valley Relics Museum. The nine surviving cars have become collector's items. One car is in the Country Music Hall of Fame in Nashville, Tennessee. In 1972 and 1974, two vehicles were bought by Bobbejaan Schoepen, a Belgian entertainer with a passion for country music. The Roy Rogers Pontiac sold for $308,000 in 2015.
