= Helen Barbara Kruger =

American businesswoman (1913–2006)

Helen Barbara Kruger (July 29, 1913 – April 7, 2006) also known as Bobbie Nudie, was an American apparel designer and retailer.

Kruger was born in Mankato, Minnesota. She met her future husband Nudie Cohn at her parents’ boarding house. He had done time in Leavenworth for trafficking in drugs, but they fell in love and moved to New York City.

They returned to Mankato to marry, then opened a business called Nudie's for the Ladies in Manhattan in 1934, which sold g-strings and lingerie to showgirls. It was around this time that Helen and Nudie had their only child, Barbara Cohn.

Later, in Hollywood, her husband made many rhinestone-studded costumes for Tex Williams, Hank Williams, Cher, Elton John, Buck Owens, Clint Eastwood, John Lennon, Gene Autry, Roy Rogers and Dale Evans. Among their most famous creations was a $10,000 gold lamé suit for Elvis Presley, designed and created by Nudie. Helen, or "Bobbie" as she was more famously known, was considered to do merchandising and sales at Nudies.

Nudie Cohn died in 1984. Bobbie, her sister Edith, daughter Barbara and granddaughter carried on after this until the Nudie's store was finally closed in 1994.

She died in Valencia, California, aged 92. She is buried at Forest Lawn Memorial Park (Hollywood Hills).
