= Nudie Cohn =

Ukrainian-American tailor and fashion designer (1902–1984)

- Cohn in 1969
- Born: Nuta Kotlyarenko; December 15, 1902; Kiev, Southwestern Krai, Russian Empire (present-day Kyiv, Ukraine)
- Died: May 9, 1984 (aged 81); Burbank, California, U.S.
- Occupation: Fashion designer
- Known for: Nudie Suits
- Label: Nudie's Rodeo Tailors

Nuta Kotlyarenko (Ukrainian: Нута Котляренко; December 15, 1902 – May 9, 1984), known professionally as Nudie Cohn, was a Ukrainian-American tailor who designed decorative rhinestone-covered suits, known popularly as "Nudie Suits", and other elaborate outfits for some of the most famous celebrities of his era. He also became famous for his outrageous customized automobiles.

== Early life ==
Kotlyarenko was born in Kyiv on December 15, 1902, to a Jewish family. To escape the pogroms of Czarist Russia, his parents sent him, at age 11 with his brother Julius, to America. For a time, he criss-crossed the country, working as a shoeshine boy and later a boxer. He later claimed associating with gangster Pretty Boy Floyd. While living in a boardinghouse in Mankato, Minnesota, he met Helen "Bobbie" Kruger, and married her in 1934. In the midst of the Great Depression, the newlyweds moved to New York City and opened their first store, "Nudie's for the Ladies", specializing in custom-made undergarments for showgirls.

== Clothing business ==
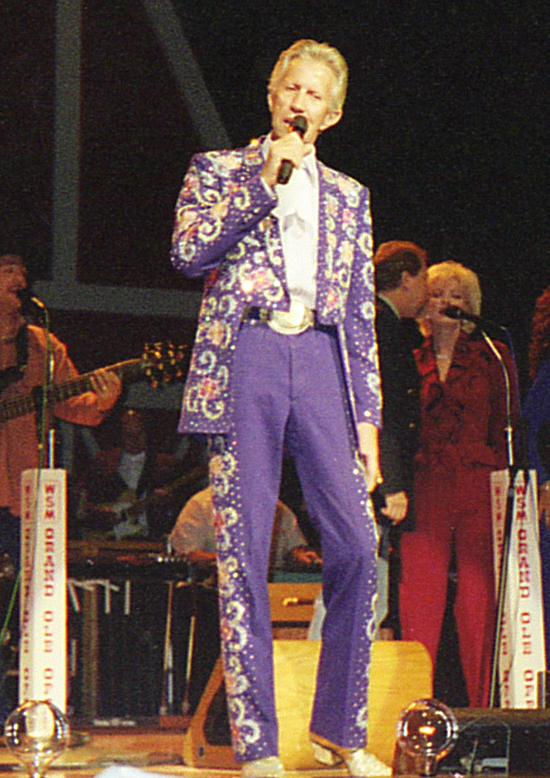
Porter Wagoner performing at the Grand Ole Opry in a Nudie suit, 1999

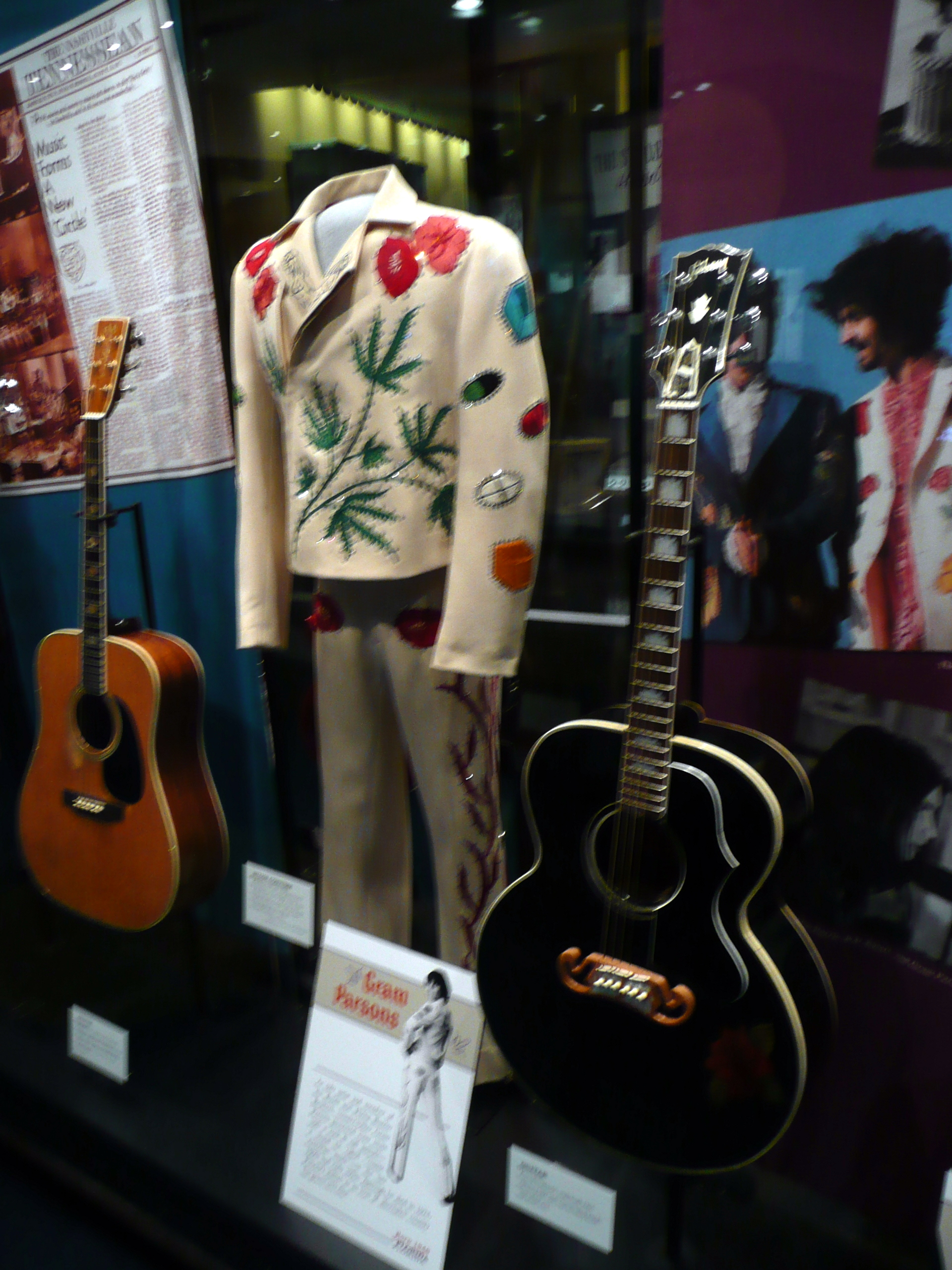
Gram Parsons' Nudie suit, on display at the Country Music Hall of Fame

Cohn and Kruger relocated to California in the early 1940s, and began designing and manufacturing clothing in their garage. In 1947, Cohn persuaded young, struggling country singer Tex Williams to buy him a sewing machine with the proceeds from auctioning off a horse. In exchange, Cohn made clothing for Williams. As their creations gained a following, the Cohns opened "Nudie's of Hollywood" on the corner of Victory Boulevard and Vineland Avenue in North Hollywood, dealing exclusively in Western wear, a style much in fashion at the time.

Cohn's designs brought the already-flamboyant Western style to a new level of ostentation with the liberal use of rhinestones and themed images in chain stitch embroidery. One of his early designs, in 1962, for singer Porter Wagoner, was a peach-colored suit featuring rhinestones, a covered wagon on the back, and wagon wheels on the legs. He offered the suit to Wagoner for free, confident that the popular performer would serve as a billboard for his clothing line. His confidence proved justified, and the business grew rapidly. In 1963, the Cohns relocated their business to a larger facility on Lankershim Boulevard in North Hollywood and renamed it "Nudie's Rodeo Tailors".

Many of Cohn's designs became signature looks for their owners. Among his most famous creations was Elvis Presley's $10,000 gold lamé suit worn by the singer on the cover of his 50,000,000 Elvis Fans Can't Be Wrong album. Cohn created Hank Williams' white cowboy suit with musical notations on the sleeves, and Gram Parsons' infamous suit for the cover of the Flying Burrito Brothers' 1969 album The Gilded Palace of Sin, featuring pills, poppies, marijuana leaves, naked women, and a huge cross. He designed the iconic costume worn by Robert Redford in the 1979 film The Electric Horseman, which was exhibited by the National Cowboy & Western Heritage Museum in Oklahoma City. He also designed Jimmy Page's famous black colored Dragon suit worn at Led Zeppelin's Earl's Court shows in 1975.

Many of the film costumes worn by Roy Rogers and Dale Evans were Nudie's designs. John Lennon was a customer, as were John Wayne, David Cassidy, Gene Autry, George Jones, Cher, Ronald Reagan, Elton John, Robert Mitchum, Pat Buttram, Tony Curtis, Michael Landon, Glen Campbell, Michael Nesmith, Hank Snow, Hank Thompson, and numerous musical groups, notably America and Chicago. ZZ Top band members Billy Gibbons and Dusty Hill sported Nudie suits on the cover photo of their 1975 album Fandango!.

In 2006, Porter Wagoner said he had accumulated 52 Nudie suits, costing between $11,000 and $18,000 each, since receiving his first free outfit in 1962. Belgian entertainer Bobbejaan Schoepen was a client and personal friend; his collection of 35 complete stage outfits is the largest in Europe.

Cohn strutted around town in his own outrageous suits and rhinestone-studded cowboy hats. His sartorial trademark was mismatched boots, which he wore, he said, to remember his humble beginnings in the 1930s, when he could not afford a matching pair of shoes. He shamelessly promoted himself and his products throughout his career. According to his granddaughter, Jamie Lee Nudie (who changed her last name to her grandfather's first name), he would often pay for items with dollar bills sporting a sticker of his face covering George Washington's. "When you get sick of looking at me," he would say, "just rip [the sticker] off and spend it."

== Automobiles ==
Cohn was equally famous for his garishly decorated automobiles. Between 1950 and 1975, he customized 18 vehicles, mostly white Pontiac Bonneville convertibles, with silver dollar-studded dashboards, pistol door handles and gearshifts, extended rear bumpers, and enormous Longhorn steer-horn hood ornaments. They were nicknamed "Nudie Mobiles", and the nine surviving cars have become valued collector's items. A Bonneville convertible designed for country singer Webb Pierce is on display at the Country Music Hall of Fame and Museum in Nashville, Tennessee. A Pontiac Grand Ville convertible customized by Nudie can be seen at the end of the 1988 Buck Owens/Dwight Yoakam music video, "The Streets of Bakersfield". That same car—which Owens's manager claims was originally built for Elvis Presley—now hangs over the bar inside Buck Owens's Crystal Palace in Bakersfield, California. Two Nudie Mobiles owned by Schoepen remain on display at Bobbejaanland, a Western-themed amusement park near Antwerp.

== Death and legacy ==
Nudie Cohn died in 1984 at the age of 81. Numerous celebrities and long-time customers attended his funeral. The eulogy was delivered by Dale Evans. Nudie's Rodeo Tailors remained open as a tailor for an additional 10 years under the ownership of Nudie's widow Bobbie and granddaughter Jamie, but closed in 1994 when Bobbie retired. The business is still in operation today under their granddaughter Jamie Nudie's leadership.

A revival of Nudie suits happened among celebrities during the late 2010s and early 2020s. The new generation of clients include rappers Lil Nas X, Diplo and Post Malone, pop stars Kesha, Harry Styles, Jenny Lewis, Mike Mills, and Taylor Swift, and lead singer Brandon Flowers of The Killers, who favored black suits similar to those worn by Marty Stuart, David Lee Roth and the late Johnny Cash.

Cohn's creations, particularly those with celebrity provenance, remain popular with country-western and show-business collectors, and continue to command high prices when they come on the market. In December 2009, for example, a white Nudie stage shirt owned by Roy Rogers, decorated with blue tassels and red musical notes, sold for $16,250 at a Christie's auction. A Nudie shirt worn by Johnny Cash as grand marshal of the 1976 American Bicentennial Grand Parade in Washington, D.C., and in several subsequent stage performances, sold at auction for $25,000 in 2010.

Cohn is fictionalized in Derek McCormack's 2003 novella The Haunted Hillbilly.

== See also ==
- Manuel Cuevas
