= Rhinestone =

Diamond simulant

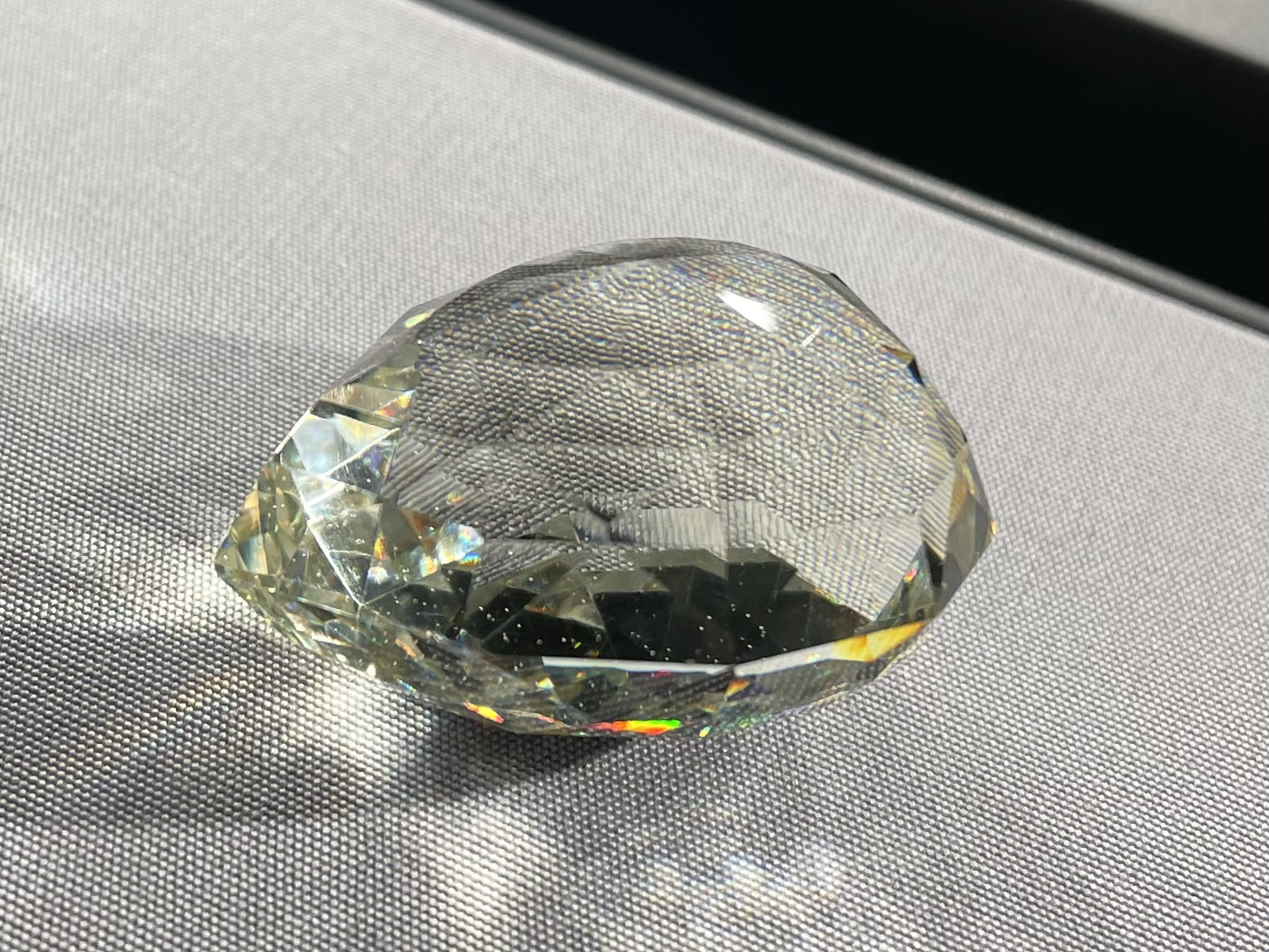
Historic rhinestone copy of the Florentine Diamond, made in 1865 in Paris by the L. Saemann company

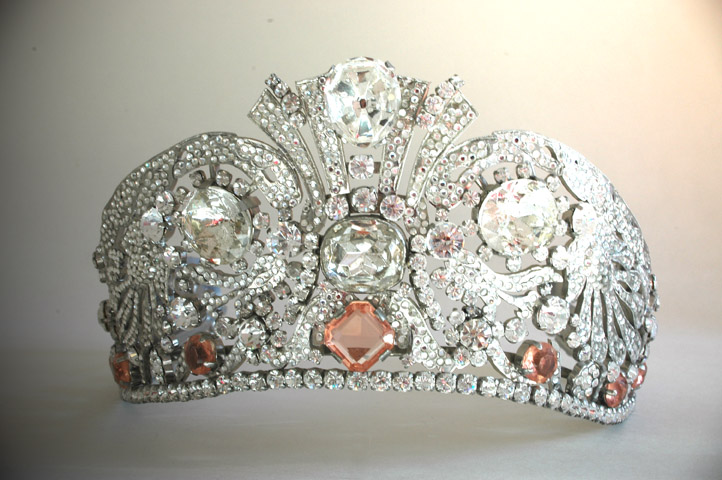
Rhinestones on a tiara

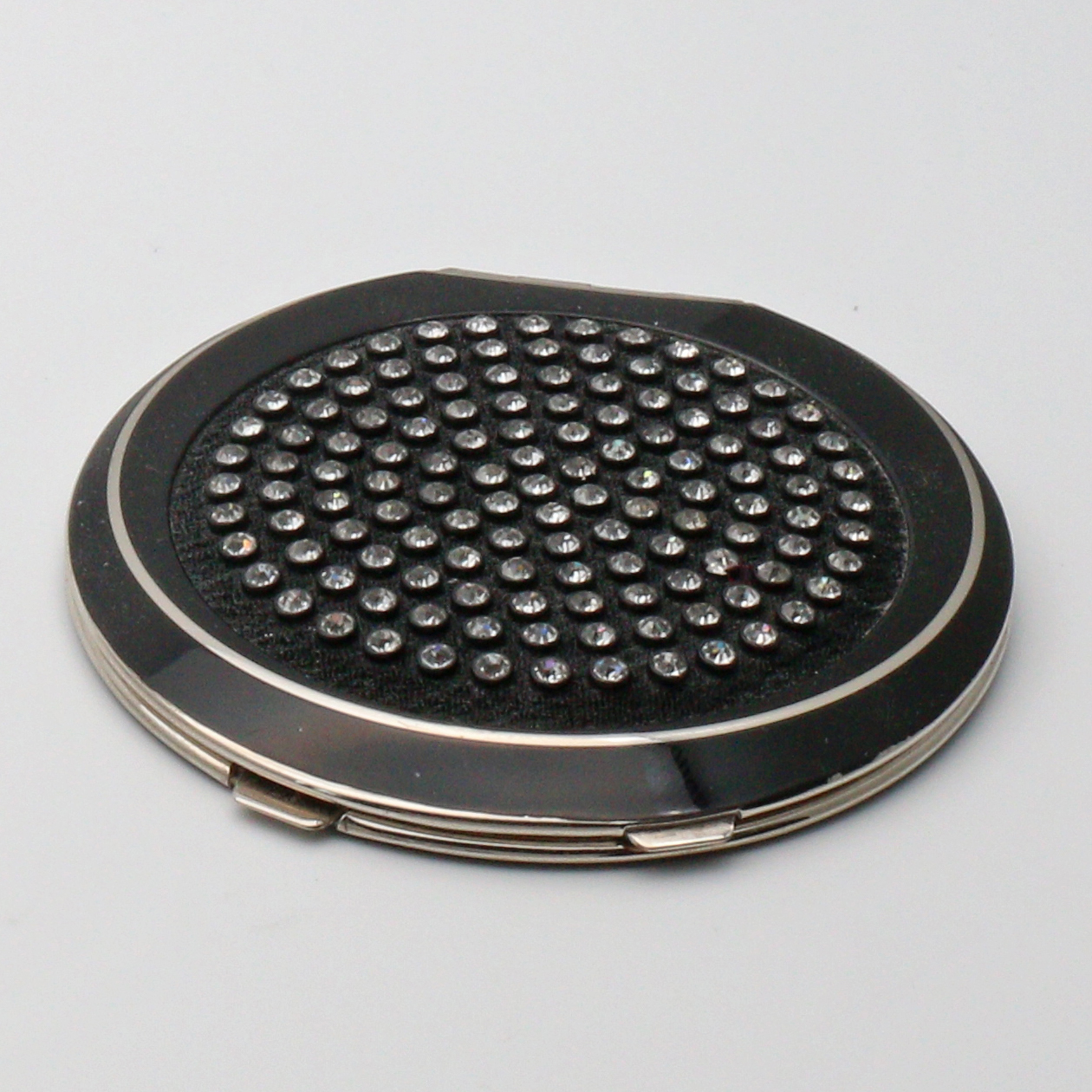
Rowenta enamel rhinestone compact

A rhinestone, paste or diamanté (UK: /ˌdiːəˈmɒnteɪ/ DEE-ə-MON-tay, US: /ˌdiːəmɒnˈteɪ/ DEE-ə-mon-TAY) is a diamond simulant originally made from rock crystal but since the 19th century from crystal glass or polymers such as acrylic.

== Origins ==
Originally, rhinestones were rock crystals gathered from the river Rhine, hence the name, although some were also found in areas like the Alps (the source of the Rhine). Today the name "rhinestone" applies only to varieties of lead glass known as crystal glass. The availability of such products increased greatly in the 18th century when the Alsatian jeweller Georg Friedrich Strass developed imitation diamonds by coating the lower side of lead glass with metal powder. Many European languages use the word strass (or equivalent) to refer to rhinestones.

As opposed to the classic rhinestones, which had a metal-powder coating on the bottom side only, several companies have opted to mass-produce iridescent lead glass by reducing the metal-coating thickness and applying it uniformly, not using metal powder with a binder but applying various forms of metal deposition (thin foil, vapor deposition, etc.). Such developments include Favrile glass by Tiffany in 1894, Carnival glass under the name "Iridrill" by Fenton in 1908, "Aurora Borealis" glass by Swarovski in 1956 and PVD-coated dichroic glass in the late 20th century, among many other decorative lead glasses coated with a thin metal layer and sold under various commercial names such as "rainbow glass," "aurora glass" and such. Paste is glass, made by grinding lead glass to a paste, packing it in a mold, and firing it. The glass is then faceted and polished.

Rhinestones can be used as imitations of diamonds, and some manufacturers even manage to partially reproduce the glistening effect which real diamonds have in the sun.

== Compositions ==
Typically, crystal rhinestones have been used on costumes, apparel, and jewelry. Crystal rhinestones are produced mainly in Austria by Swarovski and in the Czech Republic by Preciosa and a few other glassworks in northern Bohemia. In the United States, these are sometimes known as "Austrian crystal."

The rhinestone-studded Nudie suit was invented by Nudie Cohn in the 1940s, an Americanization of the matador's "suit of lights". Rhinestone material is often used as an alternative to sequins.

A popular type of rhinestone is the AB (Aurora borealis) rhinestone. AB rhinestones have a particular type of iridescent coating, applied with vacuum metal deposition.

== In popular culture ==
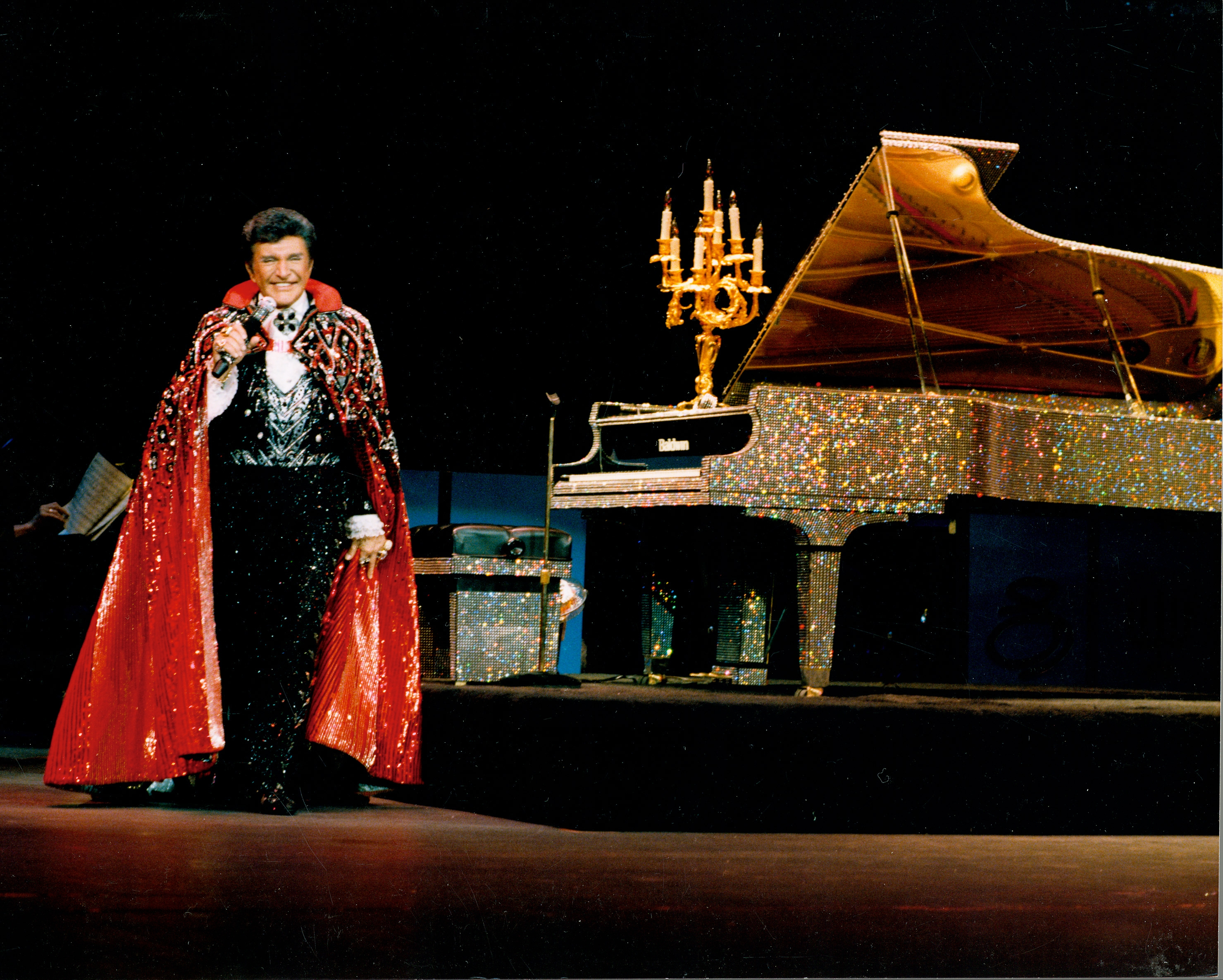
Liberace on stage in Las Vegas with a piano covered in rhinestones.

Guy de Maupassant's short story "La Parure" from 1884 centers around a seemingly valuable diamond necklace which turns out, to the protagonist's chagrin, to have been made of paste.

Liberal use of rhinestones was associated with country music singers, as well as with singer Elvis Presley and pianist Liberace. In 1974, David Allan Coe released the album The Mysterious Rhinestone Cowboy and referred to himself as The Rhinestone Cowboy again in the 1977 song "Longhaired Redneck". In 1975, Glen Campbell had a top hit with the song "Rhinestone Cowboy" and became known as the "Rhinestone Cowboy"; the song served as the basis for the 1984 movie Rhinestone starring Sylvester Stallone and Dolly Parton. The British virtual band Gorillaz released the single "Rhinestone Eyes" in 2010. The closing track on Madvillain's Madvillainy is titled "Rhinestone Cowboy". Carrie Underwood's ninth album, released in 2022, is titled Denim & Rhinestones. Kacey Musgraves's 2026 album Middle of Nowhere includes the track "Rhinestoned" and mentions rhinestones elsewhere on the album.

== Sizing guide ==
Rhinestones are sized by using the term "ss," or stone size, following a number to indicate size (e.g. 8ss is equivalent to 2.3 mm diameter, 10ss is 2.8 mm). Many of the commonly used rhinestone sizes are slightly smaller than currency. SS is more commonly used for apparel means, while PP (or pearl plate) is used for jewelry.

== Hot-fix rhinestones ==
Hot-fix rhinestones, also known as heat-transfer rhinestones, are mainly used for apparel. The flat bottom of the stone has a glue backing and, when heated, melts onto the surface of the clothing. These can be adhered using a regular clothes iron, although it is recommended to use a heat press. A heat press is able to reach higher temperatures (standard transfers require temperatures of up to 180–200 °C (350–400 °F)) while applying heavy pressures resulting in a more professional quality.
