= 1977 in country music =

This is a list of notable events in country music that took place in the year 1977.

== Events ==
- June 25 — Waylon Jennings smash, "Luckenbach, Texas (Back to the Basics of Love)" spends its sixth week at No. 1 on the Billboard Hot Country Singles chart. It is just the third (and as it turned out, final) six-week No. 1 song of the 1970s, and will be the last song to spend as long atop the charts for 20 years (until 1997's "It's Your Love" by Tim McGraw and Faith Hill).
- June 26 — Elvis Presley performs his final concert at Market Square Arena in Indianapolis, Indiana. It would later be televised on October 3 on CBS to bad reviews.
- December 31 — Dolly Parton's "Here You Come Again" spends its fifth week at No. 1 on the Billboard Hot Country Singles chart. It will be the last song to spend that long atop the chart until 1990's "Love Without End, Amen" by George Strait.

== Top hits of the year ==
=== Number one hits ===
==== United States ====
(as certified by Billboard)

Date	Single Name	Artist	Wks. No.1	CAN peak	Spec. Note
January 8	Broken Down in Tiny Pieces	Billy "Crash" Craddock	1	2	^{[B]}
January 15	You Never Miss a Real Good Thing (Till He Says Goodbye)	Crystal Gayle	1
January 22	I Can't Believe She Gives It All to Me	Conway Twitty	1
January 29	Let My Love Be Your Pillow	Ronnie Milsap	1
February 5	Near You	George Jones and Tammy Wynette	2		^{[B] – Tammy Wynette}
February 19	Moody Blue	Elvis Presley	1	3
February 26	Say You'll Stay Until Tomorrow	Tom Jones	1		^{[C]}
March 5	Heart Healer	Mel Tillis	1
March 12	She's Just an Old Love Turned Memory	Charley Pride	1
March 19	Southern Nights	Glen Campbell	2	2	^{[B]}
April 2	Lucille	Kenny Rogers	2		^{[A]}
April 16	It Couldn't Have Been Any Better	Johnny Duncan	1
April 23	She's Got You	Loretta Lynn	1
April 30	She's Pulling Me Back Again	Mickey Gilley	1
May 7	Play Guitar Play	Conway Twitty	1
May 14	Some Broken Hearts Never Mend	Don Williams	1	6
May 21	Luckenbach, Texas (Back to the Basics of Love)	Waylon Jennings	6		^{[1]}
July 2	That Was Yesterday	Donna Fargo	1		^{[B]}
July 9	I'll Be Leaving Alone	Charley Pride	1
July 16	It Was Almost Like a Song	Ronnie Milsap	3	12
August 6	Rollin' with the Flow	Charlie Rich	2
August 20	Way Down	Elvis Presley	1		Elvis died four days before the song went to No. 1.
August 27	Don't It Make My Brown Eyes Blue	Crystal Gayle	4
September 24	I've Already Loved You in My Mind	Conway Twitty	1	4
October 1	Daytime Friends	Kenny Rogers	1
October 8	Heaven's Just a Sin Away	The Kendalls	4		^{[A]}
November 5	I'm Just a Country Boy	Don Williams	1
November 12	More to Me	Charley Pride	1
November 19	The Wurlitzer Prize (I Don't Want to Get Over You)	Waylon Jennings	2
December 3	Here You Come Again	Dolly Parton	5

Notes

- 1 No. 1 song of the year, as determined by Billboard.
- A First Billboard No. 1 hit for that artist.
- B Last Billboard No. 1 hit for that artist.
- C Only Billboard No. 1 hit for that artist to date.

==== Canada ====
(as certified by RPM)

Date	Single Name	Artist	Wks. No.1	U.S. peak	Spec. Note
January 8	Every Face Tells a Story	Olivia Newton-John	1	21	^{[B]}
January 15	Sweet Dreams	Emmylou Harris	1
January 22	I Can't Believe She Gives It All to Me	Conway Twitty	1
January 29	You Never Miss a Real Good Thing (Till He Says Goodbye)	Crystal Gayle	2
February 12	Let My Love Be Your Pillow	Ronnie Milsap	2
February 26	Saying Hello, Saying I Love You, Saying Goodbye	Jim Ed Brown and Helen Cornelius	1	2	^{[C] – Jim Ed Brown}^{[C] – Helen Cornelius}
March 5	Near You	George Jones and Tammy Wynette	1
March 12	Say You'll Stay Until Tomorrow	Tom Jones	2		^{[C]}
March 26	She's Just an Old Love Turned Memory	Charley Pride	1
April 2	It's My Party	Carroll Baker	1	—
April 9	Heart Healer	Mel Tillis	1
April 16	Lucille	Kenny Rogers	2		^{[A]}
April 30	It Couldn't Have Been Any Better	Johnny Duncan	1
May 7	She's Got You	Loretta Lynn	1
May 14	She's Pulling Me Back Again	Mickey Gilley	1
May 21	Play Guitar Play	Conway Twitty	1
May 28	Paper Rosie	Gene Watson	1	3	^{[C]}
June 4	The Rains Came	Freddy Fender	2	4	^{[B]}
June 18	Luckenbach, Texas (Back to the Basics of Love)	Waylon Jennings	3		^{[1]}
July 9	I'll Be Leaving Alone	Charley Pride	1
July 16	That Was Yesterday	Donna Fargo	2
July 30	It's Late (And I Have to Go)	Carroll Baker	2	—
August 13	Making Believe	Emmylou Harris	1	8
August 20	I Can't Love You Enough	Conway Twitty and Loretta Lynn	1	2
August 27	Susan Flowers	Dick Damron	1	—	^{[B]}
September 3	Rollin' with the Flow	Charlie Rich	1		^{[B]}
September 10	Way Down/Pledging My Love	Elvis Presley	2		His Funeral aired on TV Channels across the country. However his funeral appeared on Der schwarze Kanal on East German Television.
September 24	Don't It Make My Brown Eyes Blue	Crystal Gayle	2
October 8	Christopher Mary	Burton & Honeyman	1	—	^{[C]}
October 15	Daytime Friends	Kenny Rogers	2
October 29	Heaven's Just a Sin Away	The Kendalls	1		^{[C]}
November 5	The Morning After Baby Let Me Down	Carroll Baker	1	—
November 12	I'm Just a Country Boy	Don Williams	1
November 19	We Can't Go On Living Like This	Eddie Rabbitt	1	6
November 26	More to Me	Charley Pride	1
December 3	The Wurlitzer Prize (I Don't Want to Get Over You)	Waylon Jennings	1
December 10	Here You Come Again	Dolly Parton	2
December 24	Georgia Keeps Pulling on My Ring	Conway Twitty	1	3
December 31	Sweet Music Man	Kenny Rogers	1	9

Notes

- 1 No. 1 song of the year, as determined by RPM.
- A First RPM No. 1 hit for that artist.
- B Last RPM No. 1 hit for that artist.
- C Only RPM No. 1 hit for that artist.

=== Other major hits ===
==== Singles released by American artists ====
US	CAN	Single	Artist
24	16	Abilene	Sonny James
4	3	Adios Amigo	Marty Robbins
10	6	(After Sweet Memories) Play Born to Lose Again	Dottsy
12	23	Anything but Leavin'	Larry Gatlin
7	3	Are You Ready for the Country	Waylon Jennings
15	20	Baby, I Love You So	Joe Stampley
22	20	Baby, You Look Good to Me Tonight	John Denver
19	—	Barbara Don't Let Me Be the Last to Know	Mel Street
2	2	Blue Bayou	Linda Ronstadt
11	23	Bluest Heartache of the Year	Kenny Dale
12	8	Born Believer	Jim Ed Brown and Helen Cornelius
9	3	Burning Memories	Mel Tillis
23	10	C.B. Savage	Rod Hart
9	7	Chains of Love	Mickey Gilley
7	15	Cheap Perfume and Candlelight	Bobby Borchers
15	—	Close Enough for Lonesome	Mel Street
15	50	Country Party	Johnny Lee
13	33	Cowboys Ain't Supposed to Cry	Moe Bandy
6	2	Crazy	Linda Ronstadt
16	19	Dancing the Night Away	Tanya Tucker
15	38	The Danger of a Stranger	Stella Parton
5	5	Desperado	Johnny Rodriguez
3	10	Don't Be Angry	Donna Fargo
5	5	Don't Go City Girl on Me	Tommy Overstreet
6	5	Don't Let Me Touch You	Marty Robbins
15	—	Don't Say Goodbye	Rex Allen, Jr.
5	5	Don't Throw It All Away	Dave & Sugar
2	2	East Bound and Down	Jerry Reed
12	13	Easy Look	Charlie Rich
14	7	Everyday I Have to Cry Some	Joe Stampley
19	—	The Feeling's Right	Narvel Felts
18	—	Fool	John Wesley Ryles
9	16	Fools Fall in Love	Jacky Ward
4	3	From Graceland to the Promised Land	Merle Haggard
18	—	Gentle to Your Senses	Mel McDaniel
16	15	Hangin' On	Vern Gosdin and Emmylou Harris
19	15	He Ain't You	Lynn Anderson
7	4	Head to Toe	Bill Anderson
12	14	Hold Me	Barbara Mandrell
4	2	Honky Tonk Memories	Mickey Gilley
2	5	I Can't Help Myself	Eddie Rabbitt
10	7	I Don't Know Why (I Just Do)	Marty Robbins
3	—	I Don't Wanna Cry	Larry Gatlin
3	3	I Got the Hoss	Mel Tillis
15	10	I Just Came Home to Count the Memories	Cal Smith
9	20	I Love You a Thousand Ways	Willie Nelson
8	8	I Was There	The Statler Brothers
2	3	I'll Do It All Over Again	Crystal Gayle
10	17	I'm Getting Good at Missing You (Solitaire)	Rex Allen, Jr.
2	4	I'm Knee Deep in Loving You	Dave & Sugar
11	29	I'm Not Easy	Billie Jo Spears
9	9	I'm Sorry for You, My Friend	Moe Bandy
8	6	I'm the Only Hell (Mama Ever Raised)	Johnny Paycheck
16	—	I've Got You (To Come Home To)	Don King
12	18	If It Ain't Love by Now	Jim Ed Brown and Helen Cornelius
11	12	If Love Was a Bottle of Wine	Tommy Overstreet
5	5	If Practice Makes Perfect	Johnny Rodriguez
2	2	If We're Not Back in Love by Monday	Merle Haggard
11	16	If You Don't Love Me (Why Don't You Just Leave Me Alone)	Freddy Fender
16	—	If You Ever Get to Houston (Look Me Down)	Don Gibson
20	17	If You Gotta Make a Fool of Somebody	Dickey Lee
8	17	If You Want Me	Billie Jo Spears
15	30	In the Jailhouse Now	Sonny James
7	2	It's a Cowboy Lovin' Night	Tanya Tucker
12	8	It's All in the Game	Tom T. Hall
14	—	It's Nothin' to Me	Jim Reeves
13	8	The King Is Gone	Ronnie McDowell
7	28	Let Me Down Easy	Cristy Lane
6	8	(Let's Get Together) One Last Time	Tammy Wynette
6	5	Liars One, Believers Zero	Bill Anderson
11	4	Light of a Clear Blue Morning	Dolly Parton
21	10	Look Who I'm Cheatin' on Tonight	Bobby Bare
3	6	Love Is Just a Game	Larry Gatlin
12	—	Love's Explosion	Margo Smith
19	—	Loving Arms	Sammi Smith
20	18	Lovin' On	T. G. Sheppard
14	16	A Mansion on the Hill	Ray Price
13	8	Margaritaville	Jimmy Buffett
3	3	Married But Not to Each Other	Barbara Mandrell
15	12	Me and Millie (Stompin' Grapes and Gettin' Silly)	Ronnie Sessions
16	31	Midnight Angel	Barbara Mandrell
27	9	Mobile Boogie	Hank Williams, Jr.
9	6	Mockingbird Hill	Donna Fargo
17	27	Mother Country Music	Vern Gosdin
10	15	The Movies	The Statler Brothers
20	—	My Good Thing's Gone	Narvel Felts
24	14	My Mountain Dew	Charlie Rich
43	12	New Kid in Town	Eagles
11	9	The Old Man and His Horn	Gene Watson
5	9	Once in a Lifetime Thing	John Wesley Ryles
6	17	One of a Kind	Tammy Wynette
13	—	The Pay Phone	Bob Luman
13	23	The Pleasure's Been All Mine	Freddie Hart
2	3	Ramblin' Fever	Merle Haggard
12	7	Ridin' Rainbows	Tanya Tucker
17	18	Right Time of the Night	Jennifer Warnes
2	5	Roses for Mama	C. W. McCall
14	—	Savin' This Love Song for You	Johnny Rodriguez
19	21	Semolita	Jerry Reed
8	17	Shame on Me	Donna Fargo
11	16	Shame Shame on Me (I Had Planned to Be Your Man)	Kenny Dale
11	2	She Just Loved the Cheatin' Out of Me	Moe Bandy
11	—	She Took More Than Her Share	Moe Bandy
17	—	She's the Girl of My Dreams	Don King
18	10	Silver Medals and Sweet Memories	The Statler Brothers
19	32	Sing a Sad Song	Wynn Stewart
7	7	Slide Off Your Satin Sheets	Johnny Paycheck
5	5	A Song in the Night	Johnny Duncan
5	17	Southern California	George Jones and Tammy Wynette
5	4	Statues Without Hearts	Larry Gatlin
11	13	Still the One	Bill Anderson
4	7	Sunflower	Glen Campbell
7	4	A Tear Fell	Billy "Crash" Craddock
16	25	Ten Years of This	Gary Stewart
11	4	Thank God She's Mine	Freddie Hart
7	6	That's the Way Love Should Be	Dave & Sugar
11	49	There She Goes Again	Joe Stampley
20	—	This Time I'm in It for the Love	Tommy Overstreet
7	37	Till the End	Vern Gosdin
18	11	Too Much Is Not Enough	Billie Jo Spears
3	3	Torn Between Two Lovers	Mary MacGregor
18	—	Twenty-Four Hours from Tulsa	Randy Barlow
3	2	Two Dollars in the Jukebox	Eddie Rabbitt
8	4	Two Less Lonely People	Rex Allen, Jr.
4	4	Uncloudy Day	Willie Nelson
22	12	Virginia, How Far Will You Go	Dickey Lee
18	—	What a Way to Go	Bobby Borchers
21	14	What're You Doing Tonight	Janie Fricke
19	12	When It's Just You and Me	Dottie West
18	22	Where Are You Going, Billy Boy	Bill Anderson and Mary Lou Turner
12	19	Whispers	Bobby Borchers
7	6	Why Can't He Be You	Loretta Lynn
8	3	Why Lovers Turn to Strangers	Freddie Hart
16	9	Wiggle Wiggle	Ronnie Sessions
16	8	A Working Man Can't Get Nowhere Today	Merle Haggard
12	6	Wrap Your Love All Around Your Man	Lynn Anderson
3	2	Y'all Come Back Saloon	The Oak Ridge Boys
9	11	Yesterday's Gone	Vern Gosdin and Emmylou Harris
4	6	You Light Up My Life	Debby Boone
6	4	(You Never Can Tell) C'est La Vie	Emmylou Harris
16	11	You Ought to Hear Me Cry	Willie Nelson
9	21	You're Free to Go	Sonny James
4	11	Your Man Loves You Honey	Tom T. Hall
11	7	Your Place or Mine	Gary Stewart
20	—	Your Pretty Roses Came Too Late	Lois Johnson

==== Singles released by Canadian artists ====
US	CAN	Single	Artist
—	13	Here Comes Yesterday	R. Harlan Smith
—	17	Hey Good Lookin'	Bob Lucier
—	14	Homemade Wine	The Good Brothers
—	8	I'd Love You Like Nobody Dared To	Chris Nielsen
—	18	If I Believed in Myself	Mercey Brothers
—	9	It's Crying Time for Me	Dallas Harms
—	20	Jamie	Mercey Brothers
—	7	Jukebox Lover	Family Brown
27	11	The Last of the Winfield Amateurs	Ray Griff
—	11	Leroy Can't Go Home	Orval Prophet
—	10	Lovin' Fool	Family Brown
—	10	Michelle's Song	Russell Thornberry
—	18	On the Road Again	Burton & Honeyman
28	20	A Passing Thing	Ray Griff
—	19	Phone Call from Allyson	Ronnie Prophet
—	14	Race Among the Ruins	Gordon Lightfoot
—	20	Rocky Road	Glory-Anne Carriere
—	19	Shadow of a Man	Mike Graham
—	14	Shilo Song	Gene MacLellan with Anne Murray
—	11	Sing a Song of Love	Family Brown
—	13	Tulsa Turnaround	Gustafson
—	13	Waylon's T-shirt	Dick Damron
—	7	Wiggle It a Little	Rondini
—	16	Winestoned Plowboy	Nestor Pistor
—	9	Woman Alone	Glory-Anne Carriere
—	19	Would You Still Love Me	Mike Graham

== Top new album releases ==
Album	Artist	Record Label
Changes in Latitudes, Changes in Attitudes	Jimmy Buffett	MCA
Fargo Country	Donna Fargo	Warner Bros.
Here You Come Again	Dolly Parton	RCA
Ol' Waylon	Waylon Jennings	RCA
She's Just an Old Love Turned Memory	Charley Pride	RCA
Take This Job and Shove It	Johnny Paycheck	Epic

=== Other new albums ===
Album	Artist	Record Label
Billy Boy & Mary Lou	Bill Anderson and Mary Lou Turner	MCA
Country Sweet	Stella Parton	Elektra
Daytime Friends	Kenny Rogers	United Artists
Happiness	Margo Smith	Warner Bros.
I Remember Patsy	Loretta Lynn	MCA
If You Want Me	Billie Jo Spears	United Artists
It Was Almost Like a Song	Ronnie Milsap	RCA
Kenny Rogers	Kenny Rogers	United Artists
Scorpio	Bill Anderson	MCA
Southern Nights	Glen Campbell	Capitol
To Lefty From Willie	Willie Nelson	Columbia
Y'all Come Back Saloon	Oak Ridge Boys	Dot

== Births ==
- February 28 — Jason Aldean, male vocalist of the 2000s.
- May 3 – Eric Church, male vocalist starting in the late 2000s, best known for "Springsteen" and "Drink in My Hand."
- November 17 — Aaron Lines, Canadian country singer of the 2000s, best known for his hit "You Can't Hide Beautiful".
- November 20 — Josh Turner, deep bass-voiced singer of the 2000s, best known for "Why Don't We Just Dance" and "Time is Love."

== Deaths ==
- March 22 – Stoney Cooper, 58, bluegrass and gospel singer who best known for his series of recordings with wife, Wilma Lee (as Wilma Lee and Stoney Cooper), from the 1940s through early 1960s.
- May 31 – Lloyd Perryman, 60, member of the Sons of the Pioneers.
- July 16 — Marg Osburne, 49, "The Girl from the Singing Hills", of CBC Radio and CBC Television fame.
- August 16 — Elvis Presley, 42, "The King," cross-genre celebrity who fused rhythm and blues, rockabilly and country music to become popular with country and rock audiences (heart failure).
- October 14 — Bing Crosby, 74, one of popular music's all-time leading performers; several of his 1930s and 1940s hits became hugely popular with country fans (including "Pistol Packin' Mama," the first-ever Billboard country No. 1 song). (heart attack)

== Country Music Hall of Fame Inductees ==
- Merle Travis (1917–1983)

== Major awards ==
=== Grammy Awards ===
- Best Female Country Vocal Performance — "Don't It Make My Brown Eyes Blue", Crystal Gayle
- Best Male Country Vocal Performance — "Lucille", Kenny Rogers
- Best Country Performance by a Duo or Group with Vocal — "Heaven's Just a Sin Away", The Kendalls
- Best Country Instrumental Performance — "Country Instrumentalist of the Year", Hargus "Pig" Robbins
- Best Country Song — "Don't It Make My Brown Eyes Blue", Richard Leigh (Performer: Crystal Gayle)

=== Juno Awards ===
- Country Male Vocalist of the Year — Murray McLauchlan
- Country Female Vocalist of the Year — Carroll Baker
- Country Group or Duo of the Year — The Good Brothers

=== Academy of Country Music ===
- Entertainer of the Year — Dolly Parton
- Song of the Year — "Lucille", Roger Bowling and Hal Bynum (Performer: Kenny Rogers)
- Single of the Year — "Lucille", Kenny Rogers
- Album of the Year — Kenny Rogers, Kenny Rogers
- Top Male Vocalist — Kenny Rogers
- Top Female Vocalist — Crystal Gayle
- Top Vocal Group — The Statler Brothers
- Top New Male Vocalist — Eddie Rabbitt
- Top New Female Vocalist — Debby Boone

=== Country Music Association ===
- Entertainer of the Year — Ronnie Milsap
- Song of the Year — "Lucille", Roger Bowling and Hal Bynum (Performer: Kenny Rogers)
- Single of the Year — "Lucille", Kenny Rogers
- Album of the Year — Ronnie Milsap Live, Ronnie Milsap
- Male Vocalist of the Year — Ronnie Milsap
- Female Vocalist of the Year — Crystal Gayle
- Vocal Duo of the Year — Jim Ed Brown and Helen Cornelius
- Vocal Group of the Year — The Statler Brothers
- Instrumentalist of the Year — Roy Clark
- Instrumental Group of the Year — Original Texas Playboys

== Other links ==
- Country Music Association
- Inductees of the Country Music Hall of Fame
