= List of RPM number-one country singles of 1977 =

These are the Canadian number-one country songs of 1977, per the RPM Country Tracks chart.

Issue date	Title	Artist
January 8	Every Face Tells a Story	Olivia Newton-John
January 15	Sweet Dreams	Emmylou Harris
January 22	I Can't Believe She Gives It All to Me	Conway Twitty
January 29	You Never Miss a Real Good Thing (Till He Says Goodbye)	Crystal Gayle
February 5	You Never Miss a Real Good Thing (Till He Says Goodbye)	Crystal Gayle
February 12	Let My Love Be Your Pillow	Ronnie Milsap
February 19	Let My Love Be Your Pillow	Ronnie Milsap
February 26	Saying Hello, Saying I Love You, Saying Goodbye	Jim Ed Brown and Helen Cornelius
March 5	Near You	George Jones and Tammy Wynette
March 12	Say You'll Stay Until Tomorrow	Tom Jones
March 19	Say You'll Stay Until Tomorrow	Tom Jones
March 26	She's Just an Old Love Turned Memory	Charley Pride
April 2	It's My Party	Carroll Baker
April 9	Heart Healer	Mel Tillis
April 16	Lucille	Kenny Rogers
April 23	Lucille	Kenny Rogers
April 30	It Couldn't Have Been Any Better	Johnny Duncan
May 7	She's Got You	Loretta Lynn
May 14	She's Pulling Me Back Again	Mickey Gilley
May 21	Play Guitar Play	Conway Twitty
May 28	Paper Rosie	Gene Watson
June 4	The Rains Came	Freddy Fender
June 11	The Rains Came	Freddy Fender
June 18	Luckenbach, Texas (Back to the Basics of Love)	Waylon Jennings
June 25	Luckenbach, Texas (Back to the Basics of Love)	Waylon Jennings
July 2	Luckenbach, Texas (Back to the Basics of Love)	Waylon Jennings
July 9	I'll Be Leaving Alone	Charley Pride
July 16	That Was Yesterday	Donna Fargo
July 23	That Was Yesterday	Donna Fargo
July 30	It's Late (And I Have to Go)	Carroll Baker
August 6	It's Late (And I Have to Go)	Carroll Baker
August 13	Making Believe	Emmylou Harris
August 20	I Can't Love You Enough	Conway Twitty and Loretta Lynn
August 27	Susan Flowers	Dick Damron
September 3	Rollin' with the Flow	Charlie Rich
September 10	Way Down/Pledging My Love	Elvis Presley
September 17	Way Down/Pledging My Love	Elvis Presley
September 24	Don't It Make My Brown Eyes Blue	Crystal Gayle
October 1	Don't It Make My Brown Eyes Blue	Crystal Gayle
October 8	Christopher Mary	Burton & Honeyman
October 15	Daytime Friends	Kenny Rogers
October 22	Daytime Friends	Kenny Rogers
October 29	Heaven's Just a Sin Away	The Kendalls
November 5	The Morning After Baby Let Me Down	Carroll Baker
November 12	I'm Just a Country Boy	Don Williams
November 19	We Can't Go on Living Like This	Eddie Rabbitt
November 26	More to Me	Charley Pride
December 3	The Wurlitzer Prize (I Don't Want to Get Over You)	Waylon Jennings
December 10	Here You Come Again	Dolly Parton
December 17	Here You Come Again	Dolly Parton
December 24	Georgia Keeps Pulling on My Ring	Conway Twitty
December 31	Sweet Music Man	Kenny Rogers

== See also ==
- 1977 in music
- List of number-one country singles of 1977 (U.S.)
