= List of Hot Country Singles number ones of 1977 =

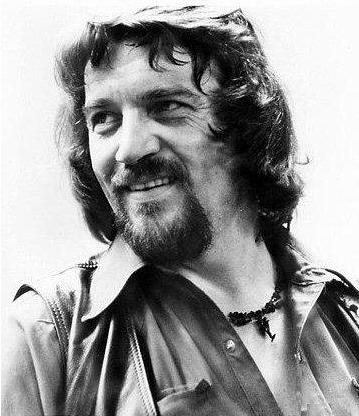
Waylon Jennings had the longest-running number one of 1977.

Hot Country Songs is a chart that ranks the top-performing country music songs in the United States, published by Billboard magazine. In 1977, 31 different singles topped the chart, which was at the time published under the title Hot Country Singles, based on playlists submitted by country music radio stations and sales reports submitted by stores.

Waylon Jennings spent the most weeks at number one, with eight, including a run of six weeks at the top with "Luckenbach, Texas (Back to the Basics of Love)"; no single since 1967 had spent longer at number one. Crystal Gayle and Dolly Parton came closest to Jennings's total number of weeks at number one, each spending five weeks in the top spot. Parton's time at number one comprised a five-week run with "Here You Come Again", the second-longest running chart-topper of 1977, in the issues of Billboard dated December 3 through December 31. Conway Twitty was the only artist to take three different songs to the top of the chart. Thanks to the prevalence of crossover-friendly country pop, several country number ones of 1977 also charted highly on Billboard's all-genres singles chart, the Hot 100, including Glen Campbell's "Southern Nights", which reached number one on the Hot 100 in the issue of Billboard dated April 30, the second time that Campbell had taken a song to the top of both charts. Crystal Gayle's "Don't It Make My Brown Eyes Blue" reached number 2 on the Hot 100 and Dolly Parton's "Here You Come Again" made number 3.

In February, Welsh singer Tom Jones achieved his first country number one with "Say You'll Stay Until Tomorrow". Previously associated mainly with the pop music field, albeit with some forays into country, Jones focused on the country music market when he returned to recording in the mid-1970s after concentrating in the early part of the decade on live stage shows in Las Vegas. He immediately topped the Hot Country chart with his very first entry and would achieve several more country hits over the next decade before moving back into the pop market. Father-daughter duo The Kendalls also topped the chart for the first time in 1977, spending four weeks atop the listing with "Heaven's Just a Sin Away"; although they had entered the chart several times previously, none of their earlier hits had even reached the top 50. Tammy Wynette, one of country music's best-known artists and biggest-selling female singers, topped the singles chart for the last time with "Near You", a duet with her former husband George Jones. The couple had divorced in 1975, but continued to release records together. Elvis Presley, the "king of rock 'n roll", topped the country chart with the last single released in his lifetime, when "Way Down" moved up to number one in the issue of Billboard dated August 20, four days after his death.

== Chart history ==
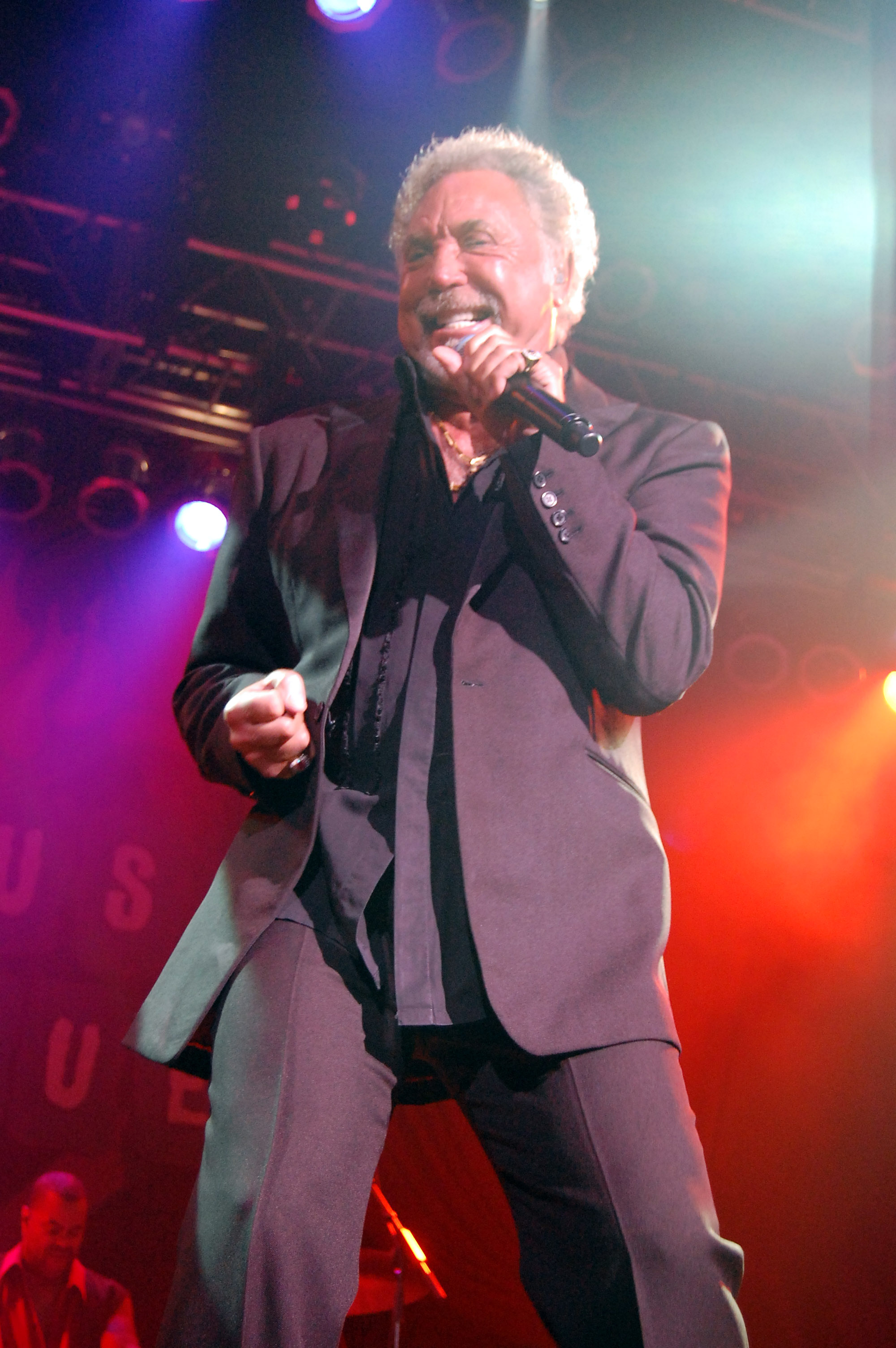
Welsh singer Tom Jones (pictured in 2009) is primarily associated with other musical genres, but had a country number one in 1977.

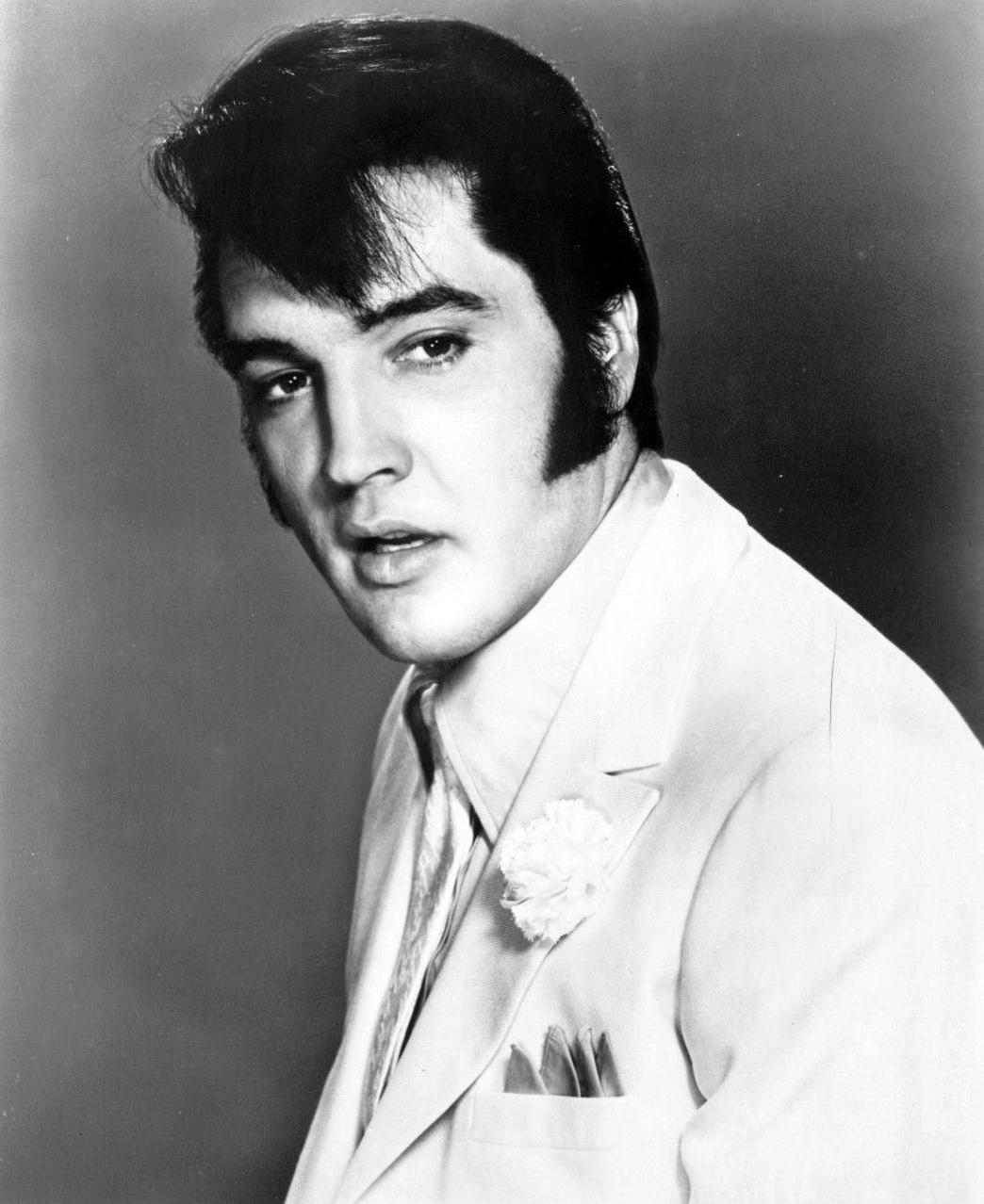
"King of rock 'n roll" Elvis Presley died on August 16, 1977. His single "Way Down" topped the country chart in the issue of Billboard dated August 20.

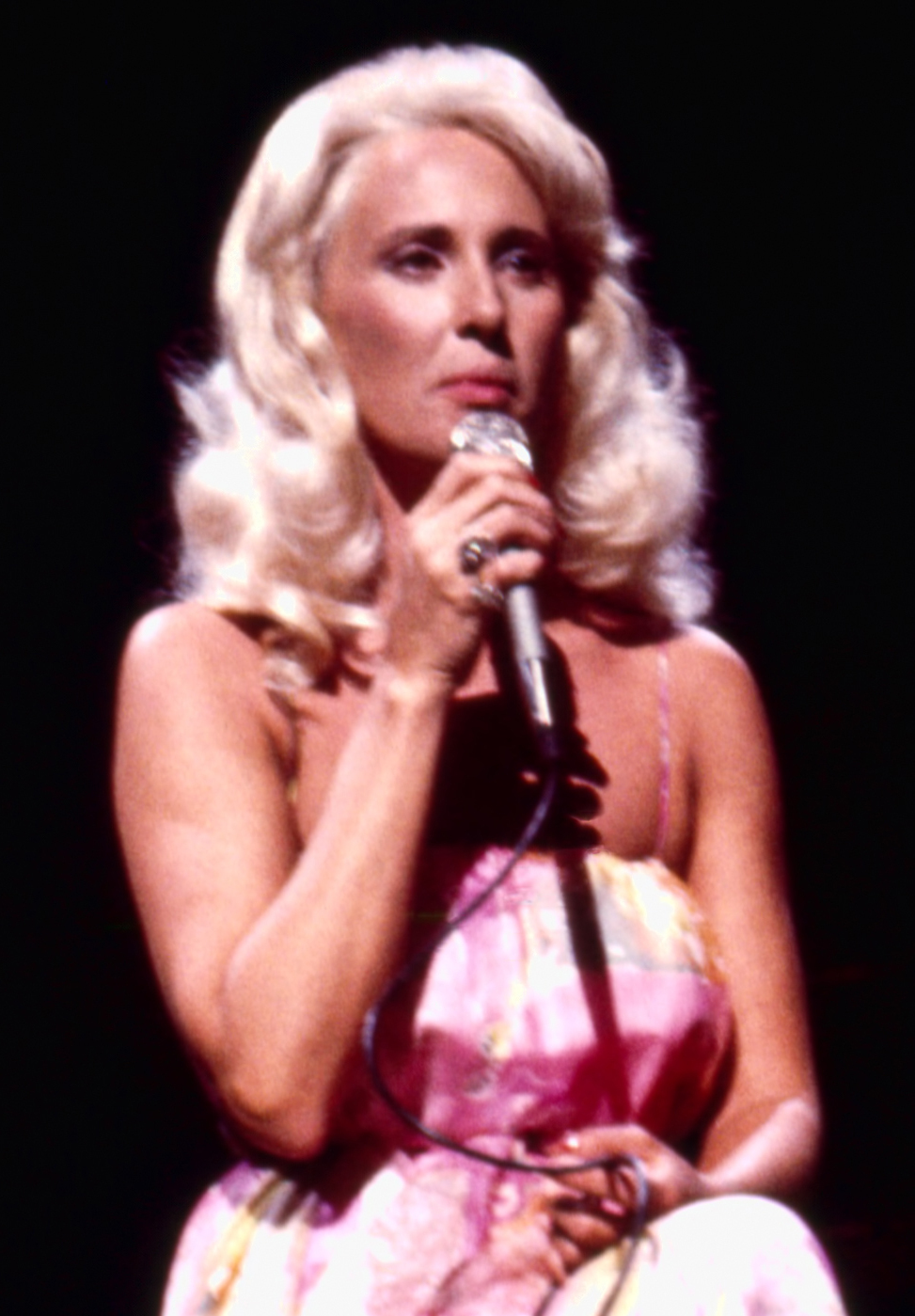
In February Tammy Wynette topped the chart with "Near You", a duet with her former husband George Jones.

Issue date	Title	Artist(s)	Ref.
January 1	"Sweet Dreams"	Emmylou Harris	
January 8	"Broken Down in Tiny Pieces"	Billy "Crash" Craddock	
January 15	"You Never Miss a Real Good Thing (Till He Says Goodbye)"	Crystal Gayle	
January 22	"I Can't Believe She Gives It All to Me"	Conway Twitty	
January 29	"Let My Love Be Your Pillow"	Ronnie Milsap	
February 5	"Near You"	George Jones and Tammy Wynette	
February 12	"Near You"	George Jones and Tammy Wynette	
February 19	"Moody Blue" / "She Thinks I Still Care" (Note: Double A-sided single)	Elvis Presley	
February 26	"Say You'll Stay Until Tomorrow"	Tom Jones	
March 5	"Heart Healer"	Mel Tillis	
March 12	"She's Just an Old Love Turned Memory"	Charley Pride	
March 19	"Southern Nights"	Glen Campbell	
March 26	"Southern Nights"	Glen Campbell	
April 2	"Lucille"	Kenny Rogers	
April 9	"Lucille"	Kenny Rogers	
April 16	"It Couldn't Have Been Any Better"	Johnny Duncan	
April 23	"She's Got You"	Loretta Lynn	
April 30	"She's Pulling Me Back Again"	Mickey Gilley	
May 7	"Play Guitar Play"	Conway Twitty	
May 14	"Some Broken Hearts Never Mend"	Don Williams	
May 21	"Luckenbach, Texas (Back to the Basics of Love)"	Waylon Jennings	
May 28	"Luckenbach, Texas (Back to the Basics of Love)"	Waylon Jennings	
June 4	"Luckenbach, Texas (Back to the Basics of Love)"	Waylon Jennings	
June 11	"Luckenbach, Texas (Back to the Basics of Love)"	Waylon Jennings	
June 18	"Luckenbach, Texas (Back to the Basics of Love)"	Waylon Jennings	
June 25	"Luckenbach, Texas (Back to the Basics of Love)"	Waylon Jennings	
July 2	"That Was Yesterday"	Donna Fargo	
July 9	"I'll Be Leaving Alone"	Charley Pride	
July 16	"It Was Almost Like a Song"	Ronnie Milsap	
July 23	"It Was Almost Like a Song"	Ronnie Milsap	
July 30	"It Was Almost Like a Song"	Ronnie Milsap	
August 6	"Rollin' with the Flow"	Charlie Rich	
August 13	"Rollin' with the Flow"	Charlie Rich	
August 20	"Way Down" / "Pledging My Love"	Elvis Presley	
August 27	"Don't It Make My Brown Eyes Blue"	Crystal Gayle	
September 3	"Don't It Make My Brown Eyes Blue"	Crystal Gayle	
September 10	"Don't It Make My Brown Eyes Blue"	Crystal Gayle	
September 17	"Don't It Make My Brown Eyes Blue"	Crystal Gayle	
September 24	"I've Already Loved You in My Mind"	Conway Twitty	
October 1	"Daytime Friends"	Kenny Rogers	
October 8	"Heaven's Just a Sin Away"	The Kendalls	
October 15	"Heaven's Just a Sin Away"	The Kendalls	
October 22	"Heaven's Just a Sin Away"	The Kendalls	
October 29	"Heaven's Just a Sin Away"	The Kendalls	
November 5	"I'm Just a Country Boy"	Don Williams	
November 12	"More to Me"	Charley Pride	
November 19	"The Wurlitzer Prize (I Don't Want to Get Over You)"	Waylon Jennings	
November 26	"The Wurlitzer Prize (I Don't Want to Get Over You)"	Waylon Jennings	
December 3	"Here You Come Again"	Dolly Parton	
December 10	"Here You Come Again"	Dolly Parton	
December 17	"Here You Come Again"	Dolly Parton	
December 24	"Here You Come Again"	Dolly Parton	
December 31	"Here You Come Again"	Dolly Parton	

== See also ==
- 1977 in music
- List of artists who reached number one on the U.S. country chart
