= Mel Tillis discography =

- Studio albums: 38
- Live albums: 5
- Compilation albums: 17
- Singles: 98
- Collaborations: 4
- No. 1 singles: 6

The discography of American country music singer Mel Tillis includes 38 studio albums, 5 live albums, 17 compilation albums, and charted 98 singles over the course of his recording career, which spanned from the late 1950s through the 2010s.

Tillis recorded for several major labels including Kapp Records, MGM Records, MCA Records, and Elektra Records. Among his most successful singles are "I Ain't Never" (1972), "Good Woman Blues" (1976), "Heart Healer" (1977), "I Believe in You" (1978), "Coca-Cola Cowboy" (1979), and "Southern Rains" (1980), each of which reached number one on the US Country chart. He also recorded collaborations with artists including Sherry Bryce, Nancy Sinatra, Bobby Bare, Waylon Jennings, and Jerry Reed.

== Studio albums ==
=== 1960s ===
Title	Album details	Peak positions
Title	Album details	US Country
Stateside	Release date: September 1966; Label: Kapp Records	—
Life's That Way (re-released as Life Turned Her That Way)	Release date: January 1967; Label: Kapp Records	21
Mr. Mel	Release date: August 1967; Label: Kapp Records	20
Let Me Talk to You	Release date: January 1968; Label: Kapp Records	17
Something Special	Release date: August 1968; Label: Kapp Records	36
Who's Julie	Release date: March 1969; Label: Kapp Records	35
Mel Tillis Sings "Old Faithful"	Release date: August 1969; Label: Kapp Records	26
"—" denotes releases that did not chart

=== 1970s ===
Title	Album details	Peak chart positions	
Title	Album details	US Country	CAN Country
She'll Be Hanging Round Somewhere	Release date: 1970; Label: Kapp Records	—	—
One More Time	Release date: August 1970; Label: MGM Records	30	—
The Arms of a Fool/Commercial Affection	Release date: January 1971; Label: MGM Records	22	—
Would You Want the World to End	Release date: May 1972; Label: MGM Records	38	—
I Ain't Never	Release date: October 1972; Label: MGM Records	18	—
Sawmill	Release date: August 1973; Label: MGM Records	3	—
Stomp Them Grapes	Release date: July 1974; Label: MGM Records	24	—
Mel Tillis and the Statesiders	Release date: March 1975; Label: MGM Records	35	—
M-M-Mel	Release date: August 1975; Label: MGM Records	21	—
Welcome to Mel Tillis Country	Release date: October 1976; Label: MGM Records	36	—
Love Revival	Release date: 1976; Label: MCA Records	14	—
Heart Healer	Release date: 1977; Label: MCA Records	6	—
Love's Troubled Waters	Release date: 1977; Label: MCA Records	15	—
I Believe in You	Release date: 1978; Label: MCA Records	14	—
Are You Sincere	Release date: 1979; Label: MCA Records	17	11
Mr. Entertainer	Release date: 1979; Label: MCA Records	21	11
Me and Pepper	Release date: 1979; Label: Elektra Records	46	4
"—" denotes releases that did not chart

=== 1980s and 1990s ===
Title	Album details	Peak chart positions	
Title	Album details	US Country	CAN Country
Your Body Is an Outlaw	Release date: 1980; Label: Elektra Records	25	—
Southern Rain	Release date: 1980; Label: Elektra Records	22	—
It's a Long Way to Daytona	Release date: 1982; Label: Elektra Records	38	—
After All This Time	Release date: 1983; Label: MCA Records	34	—
New Patches	Release date: 1984; Label: MCA Records	34	14
California Road	Release date: 1985; Label: RCA Records	—	—
New Patches	Release date: 1988; Label: Radio Records	—	—
Big Balls in Cowtown	Release date: 1988; Label: Radio Records	—	—
Beyond the Sunset	Release date: 1993; Label: Radio Records	—	—
"—" denotes releases that did not chart

=== 2000s and 2010s ===
Title	Album details	Peak chart positions	
Title	Album details	US Country	US Comedy
Wings of My Victory	Release date: 2001; Label: Radio Records	—	—
The Father's Son	Release date: 2005; Label: Radio Records	—	—
You Ain't Gonna Believe This	Release date: September 21, 2010; Label: Show Dog-Universal Music	75	3
"—" denotes releases that did not chart

== Collaborations ==
Title	Album details	Peak positions
Title	Album details	US Country
Living and Learning (with Sherry Bryce)	Release date: November 1971; Label: MGM Records	29
Let's Go All the Way Tonight (with Sherry Bryce)	Release date: 1974; Label: MGM Records	22
Mel and Nancy (with Nancy Sinatra)	Release date: 1981; Label: Elektra Records	56
Old Dogs (with Bobby Bare, Waylon Jennings, and Jerry Reed)	Release date: December 1, 1998; Label: Atlantic Records	61

== Live albums ==
Title	Album details	Peak positions
Title	Album details	US Country
Recorded Live at the Sam Houston Coliseum, Houston, Texas	Release date: July 1971; Label: MGM Records	22
Mel Tillis On Stage at the Birmingham Municipal Auditorium	Release date: February 1973; Label: MGM Records	34
Mel Tillis and the Statesiders Live	Release date: 1978; Label: MGM Records	47
M-M-Mel Live	Release date: 1980; Label: MCA Records	24
Branson City Limits	Release date: July 13, 1999; Label: Unison Records	—
"—" denotes releases that did not chart

== Compilation albums ==
Title	Album details	Peak positions
Title	Album details	US Country
Heart Over Mind	Release date: 1962; Label: Columbia Records	—
Walk on Boy	Release date: February 1966; Label: Harmony Records	—
Mel Tillis' Greatest Hits	Release date: January 1969; Label: Kapp Records	32
Mel Tillis' Greatest Hits, Vol. 2	Release date: September 1971; Label: Kapp Records	—
The Very Best of Mel Tillis	Release date: 1972; Label: MGM Records	32
Detroit City	Release date: 1973; Label: Pickwick/Hilltop	—
Mel Tillis' Greatest Hits	Release date: 1974; Label: MGM Records	17
The Best of Mel Tillis	Release date: 1975; Label: MGM Records	30
The Best of Mel Tillis and the Statesiders	Release date: 1976; Label: MGM Records	28
24 Greatest Hits	Release date: 1977; Label: MGM Records	49
Great	Release date: 1979; Label: Gusto Records	—
The Very Best of Mel Tillis	Release date: 1981; Label: MCA Records	—
Greatest Hits	Release date: 1982; Label: Elektra Records	58
American Originals	Release date: 1990; Label: Columbia Records	—
Greatest Hits	Release date: 1991; Label: Curb Records	—
Memory Maker	Release date: 1995; Label: Mercury Records	—
All His Greatest Hits	Release date: September 1, 1998; Label: PolyGram	—
"—" denotes releases that did not chart

== Singles ==
=== 1950s ===
Year	Single	Peak positions	Album
Year	Single	US Country	Album
1957	"Honky Tonk Song"	—	—N/a
1957	"Case of the Blues"	—	—N/a
1957	"Juke Box Man"	—	—N/a
1957	"Take My Hand"	—	—N/a
1958	"Lonely Street"	—	Walk on Boy
1958	"The Violet and the Rose"	24	Walk on Boy
1958	"Finally"	28	Walk on Boy
"—" denotes releases that did not chart

=== 1960s ===
Year	Single	Peak chart positions		Album
Year	Single	US Country	CAN Country	Album
1960	"Loco Weed"	—	—	Walk on Boy
1960	"Walk on Boy"	—	—	Walk on Boy
1961	"Hearts of Stone"	—	—	Walk on Boy
1962	"If I Lost Your Love"	—	—	Walk on Boy
1962	"Half Laughing, Half Crying"	—	—	—N/a
1963	"How Come Your Dog Don't Bite Nobody But Me" (with Webb Pierce)	25	—	—N/a
1963	"Couldn't See the Forest for the Trees"	—	—	—N/a
1964	"It'll Be Easy"	—	—	—N/a
1965	"Ode to the Little Brown Shack Out Back"	—	—	Great
1965	"Wine"	15	—	Stateside
1965	"Mr. Dropout"	—	—	Stateside
1966	"Mental Revenge"	—	—	Stateside
1966	"Stateside"	17	—	Stateside
1967	"Life Turned Her That Way"^{[A]}	11	—	Life Turned Her That Way
1967	"Goodbye Wheeling"	20	—	Mr. Mel
1967	"Survival of the Fittest"	71	—	Mr. Mel
1967	"All Right (I'll Sign the Papers)"	26	—	Let Me Talk to You
1968	"Something Special"	17	—	Something Special
1968	"Destroyed by Man"	31	26	Something Special
1969	"Who's Julie"	10	11	Who's Julie
1969	"Old Faithful"	15	16	Old Faithful
1969	"These Lonely Hands of Mine"	9	13	Mel Tillis' Greatest Hits
1969	"She'll Be Hanging Round Somewhere"	10	4	She'll Be Hanging Round Somewhere
"—" denotes releases that did not chart

=== 1970s ===
Year	Single	Peak chart positions		Album
Year	Single	US Country	CAN Country	Album
1970	"Heart Over Mind"	3	5	She'll Be Hanging Round Somewhere
1970	"Heaven Everyday"	5	3	One More Time
1970	"Too Lonely, Too Long"	25	29	Mel Tillis' Greatest Hits, Vol. 2
1970	"Commercial Affection"	8	14	The Arms of a Fool/ Commercial Affection
1970	"The Arms of a Fool"^{[B]}	4	13	The Arms of a Fool/ Commercial Affection
1971	"One More Drink"	56	—	Mel Tillis' Greatest Hits, Vol. 2
1971	"Brand New Mister Me"	8	46	The Very Best of Mel Tillis
1971	"Untouched"	14	17	The Very Best of Mel Tillis
1972	"Would You Want the World to End"	12	24	Would You Want the World to End
1972	"I Ain't Never"	1	1	I Ain't Never
1972	"Neon Rose"	3	3	I Ain't Never
1973	"Thank You for Being You"	21	12	Sawmill
1973	"Sawmill"	2	5	Sawmill
1973	"Midnight, Me, and the Blues"	2	2	Stomp Them Grapes
1974	"Stomp Them Grapes"	3	4	Stomp Them Grapes
1974	"Memory Maker"	3	3	I Ain't Never
1975	"The Best Way I Know How"	7	13	Mel Tillis and the Statesiders
1975	"Woman in the Back of My Mind"	4	5	Mel Tillis and the Statesiders
1975	"Lookin' for Tomorrow (And Findin' Yesterdays)"	16	4	M-M-Mel
1976	"Mental Revenge"	15	9	M-M-Mel
1976	"Love Revival"	11	15	Love Revival
1976	"Come on Home"	—	—	Welcome to Tillis Country
1976	"Good Woman Blues"	1	1	Love Revival
1976	"Heart Healer"	1	1	Heart Healer
1977	"Burning Memories"	9	3	Heart Healer
1977	"I Got the Hoss"	3	3	Love's Troubled Waters
1977	"What Did I Promise Her Last Night"	4	2	Love's Troubled Waters
1978	"I Believe in You"	1	1	I Believe in You
1978	"Ain't No California"	4	2	I Believe in You
1979	"Send Me Down to Tucson"	2	4	Are You Sincere
1979	"Coca-Cola Cowboy"	1	3	Mr. Entertainer
1979	"Blind in Love"	6	16	Me and Pepper
1979	"Lying Time Again"	6	12	Me and Pepper
"—" denotes releases that did not chart

=== 1980s and 1990s ===
Year	Single	Peak chart positions		Album
Year	Single	US Country	CAN Country	Album
1980	"Your Body Is an Outlaw"	3	32	Your Body Is an Outlaw
1980	"Steppin' Out"	9	—	Your Body Is an Outlaw
1980	"Southern Rains"	1	1	Southern Rain
1981	"Million Old Goodbyes"	8	10	Southern Rain
1981	"One Night Fever"	10	—	Southern Rain
1982	"It's a Long Way to Daytona"	36	—	It's a Long Way to Daytona
1982	"The One That Got Away"	37	—	It's a Long Way to Daytona
1982	"Stay a Little Longer"	17	—	Greatest Hits
1983	"In the Middle of the Night"	10	10	After All This Time
1983	"A Cowboy's Dream"	49	—	After All This Time
1983	"She Meant Forever When She Said Goodbye"	53	—	After All This Time
1984	"New Patches"	10	10	New Patches
1984	"Slow Nights" (with Glen Campbell)	47	—	New Patches
1985	"You Done Me Wrong"	37	46	California Road
1985	"California Road"	61	—	California Road
1988	"You'll Come Back (You Always Do)"	31	—	Tough Guys Don't Dance (soundtrack)
1989	"City Lights"	67	—	New Patches (1988)
1991	"Tall Drink of Water"	—	—	Greatest Hits (1991)
"—" denotes releases that did not chart

== Other singles ==
=== Collaborations ===
Year	Single	Artist	Peak chart positions		Album
Year	Single	Artist	US Country	CAN Country	Album
1959	"Sawmill"	Bill Phillips	27	—	—N/a
1959	"Georgia Town Blues"	Bill Phillips	24	—	—N/a
1967	"I Wish I Felt This Way at Home"	Bob Wills	—	—	—N/a
1971	"Take My Hand"^{[C]}	Sherry Bryce	8	15	Living and Learning
1971	"Living and Learning"	Sherry Bryce	9	16	Living and Learning
1972	"Anything's Better Than Nothing"	Sherry Bryce	38	—	Living and Learning
1973	"Let's Go All the Way Tonight"	Sherry Bryce	26	63	Let's Go All the Way Tonight
1974	"Don't Let Go"	Sherry Bryce	11	17	Let's Go All the Way Tonight
1974	"You Are the One"	Sherry Bryce	14	46	Let's Go All the Way Tonight
1975	"Mr. Right and Mrs. Wrong"	Sherry Bryce	32	—	Let's Go All the Way Tonight
1981	"Texas Cowboy Night"	Nancy Sinatra	23	—	Mel and Nancy
1982	"Play Me or Trade Me"	Nancy Sinatra	43	—	Mel and Nancy
1999	"Still Gonna Die"	Old Dogs	—	—	Old Dogs
"—" denotes releases that did not chart

== B-sides ==
Year	B-side	Peak positions	Original A-side
Year	B-side	US Country	Original A-side
1979	"Charlie's Angel"	flip	"Send Me Down to Tucson"
1982	"Where Would I Be" (with Nancy Sinatra)	flip	"Play Me or Trade Me"

== Notes ==
- A "Life Turned Her That Way" also peaked at number 28 on the Bubbling Under Hot 100 Singles chart.
- B "The Arms of a Fool" also peaked at number 14 on the Bubbling Under Hot 100 Singles chart.
- C "Take My Hand" also peaked at number 10 on the Bubbling Under Hot 100 Singles chart.
