= After All This Time =

After All This Time may refer to:

== Songs ==
- "After All This Time" (Rodney Crowell song)
- "After All This Time" (Simon Webbe song)
- "After All This Time", by The Beautiful Girls from Spooks
- "After All This Time", by Blaq Poet from Rewind: Deja Screw
- "After All This Time", by Carole King from Carnegie Hall Concert: June 18, 1971
- "After All This Time", by The Gordons, written by Barry and Holly Tashian
- "After All This Time", by John Hiatt from Little Head
- "After All This Time", by Kenny Rogers from They Don't Make Them Like They Used To
- "After All This Time", by Melissa Manchester from When I Look Down That Road
- "After All This Time", by Merry Clayton
- "After All This Time", by Modern Romance from Trick of the Light
- "After All This Time", by Wesley, Park & Smith, an entrant in the competition to represent the UK in the Eurovision Song Contest 1977
- "After All This Time", by Winger from Karma
- "After All This Time", from the stage musical Lestat
- "After All This Time", the theme from the UK TV series Down to Earth

== Albums ==
- After All This Time (album), by Charley Pride
- After All This Time, an album by Bonnie Koloc
- After All This Time, an album by Jim Page and Artis
- After All This Time, an album by Mel Tillis
- After All This Time, an album by Roy Heinrich
- After All This Time: The Anthology 1972-1989, an album by B.B. Seaton

== Other uses ==
- After All This Time, a novel by Vanessa Grant
- After All This Time, 2015 novel by Indian writer Nikita Singh
- "After All This Time" (Just Good Friends), a 1983 television episode
