= Someone Loves You Honey (album) =

Studio album by Charley Pride
- Released: February 1978
- Recorded: 1975–77
- Studios: RCA Studio A, Nashville, Tennessee
- Genre: Country
- Label: RCA Victor
- Producers: Jerry Bradley; Charley Pride

Charley Pride chronology
She's Just an Old Love Turned Memory (1977)	Someone Loves You Honey (1978)	Burgers and Fries/When I Stop Leaving (I'll Be Gone) (1978)

Singles from Someone Loves You Honey
- 1. "More to Me" Released: August 1977; 2. "Someone Loves You Honey" Released: January 1978

Someone Loves You Honey is the twenty-fourth studio album by American country music artist Charley Pride. It was released in February 1978 on RCA Victor and contained 11 tracks. The album was co-produced by Jerry Bradley and Pride. Two of Pride's major hits were included on the studio record: "More to Me" and the title track. Both songs became number one hits. The album itself would also reach charting positions following its release.

== Background and content ==
When Charley Pride first became successful, his musical style was built on elements of traditional, hardcore country. Yet, as his career progressed and country music changed, his sound progressed toward country pop. This style was reflected on albums in the latter half of the 1970s decade, including Someone Loves You Honey. The album was recorded at the RCA Victor Studio (located in Nashville, Tennessee) in sessions held between 1975 and 1977. The sessions were co-produced by Jerry Bradley and Pride himself. A total of 11 tracks comprised the album. Its songs included a cover of Conway Twitty's two hits, "Georgia Keeps Pulling on My Ring" and "Play Guitar Play." The album also contained original recordings, such as the title track and "Days of Sand and Shovels."

== Release and reception ==
Professional ratings
Review scores
Source	Rating
Allmusic	4/5 stars

Someone Loves You Honey was originally released in February 1978 via RCA Records. Its release would make it Pride's twenty fourth studio recording in his career. It was originally distributed as a vinyl LP, containing six songs on Side A and five songs on Side B. In later years it would be released to digital markets, including Apple Music. It spent a total of 32 weeks on the Billboard Top Country Albums. In April 1978, it peaked in the number four position. It would also become his second studio release to reach a peak position on the UK Albums Chart, where it peaked at number 48. It would later receive a rating of four stars from Allmusic.

Two singles were included on Someone Loves You Honey. Its first single was "More to Me," which was originally issued in August 1977 on RCA Victor. Spending 14 weeks charting, the single topped the Billboard Hot Country Songs chart by November 1977. Its second single release was the album's title track in January 1978. By April 1978, the single also peaked at number one on the Billboard country chart. In addition, both singles would also reach number one on the RPM Country Singles chart in Canada.

== Track listings ==
=== Vinyl version ===
Side one
No.	Title	Writer(s)	Length
1.	"Someone Loves You Honey"	Don Devaney	2:12
2.	"Georgia Keeps Pulling on My Ring"	Tim Marshall; David Wilkins	3:25
3.	"I Live You"	John Schweers	2:08
4.	"Play Guitar Play"	Conway Twitty	3:16
5.	"Another I Love You Kind of Day"	Dennis Morgan; Schweers	1:56
6.	"More to Me"	Ben Peters	2:43

Side two
No.	Title	Writer(s)	Length
1.	"Days of Our Lives"	Kent Robbins	2:30
2.	"Daydreams About Night Things"	Schweers	2:17
3.	"Heaven Watches Over Fools Like Me"	Paul Gibbons; Grindele; Tony Hatch	2:47
4.	"The Days of Sands and Shovels"	Doyle Marsh; Bud Reneau	3:47
5.	"I'm Never Leaving You"	Peters	2:13

=== Digital version ===
Someone Loves You Honey
No.	Title	Writer(s)	Length
1.	"Someone Loves You Honey"	Devaney	2:12
2.	"Georgia Keeps Pulling on My Ring"	Marshall; Wilkins	3:25
3.	"I Live You"	John Schweers	2:08
4.	"Play Guitar Play"	Twitty	3:16
5.	"Another I Love You Kind of Day"	Morgan; Schweers	1:56
6.	"More to Me"	Peters	2:43
7.	"Days of Our Lives"	Robbins	2:30
8.	"Daydreams About Night Things"	Schweers	2:17
9.	"Heaven Watches Over Fools Like Me"	Gibbons; Grindele; Hatch	2:47
10.	"The Days of Sands and Shovels"	Marsh; Reneau	3:47
11.	"I'm Never Leaving You"	Peters	2:13

== Personnel ==
All credits are adapted from the liner notes of Someone Loves You Honey.

Musical personnel

- Hayward Bishop – drums
- Harold Bradley – bass guitar
- David Briggs – piano
- Johnny Gimble – fiddle
- Lloyd Green – steel guitar
- The Jordanaires – background vocals
- Mike Leach – bass
- Charlie McCoy – harmonica
- The Nashville Edition – background vocals
- The Nashville String Machine – strings
- Charley Pride – lead vocals
- Dale Sellers – guitar
- Pete Wade – guitar
- Tommy Williams – fiddle
- Chip Young – guitar
- Reggie Young – guitar

Technical personnel

- David Briggs – arrangement
- Jerry Bradley – producer
- Bill Harris – engineer
- Charley Pride – producer
- Bill Vandevort – engineering
- Bergen White – arrangement

== Chart performance ==
Chart (1978)	Peak position
Canada Country Albums/CD's (RPM)	3
UK Albums (Official Charts)	34
US Billboard 200	207
US Top Country Albums (Billboard)	4

== Certifications ==
Region	Certification	Certified units/sales
Canada (Music Canada)	Gold	50,000^{^}
^{^} Shipments figures based on certification alone.

== Release history ==
Region	Date	Format	Label	Ref.
Australia	February 1978	Vinyl	RCA Victor Records	
Canada	February 1978	Vinyl	RCA Victor Records	
New Zealand	February 1978	Vinyl	RCA Victor Records	
United Kingdom	February 1978	Vinyl	RCA Victor Records	
United States	February 1978	Vinyl	RCA Victor Records	
United States	2010s	Sony Music Entertainment	Digital; streaming	
