= She's Just an Old Love Turned Memory =

She's Just an Old Love Turned Memory may refer to:

- "She's Just an Old Love Turned Memory" (song), a 1977 song by Charley Pride
- She's Just an Old Love Turned Memory (album), a 1977 album by Charley Pride
