= 1977 Country Music Association Awards =

Annual US music awards ceremony

- Date: October 10, 1977
- Location: Grand Ole Opry House, Nashville, Tennessee
- Hosted by: Johnny Cash
- Most wins: Ronnie Milsap (3)
- Most nominations: Waylon Jennings (5)

Television/radio coverage
- Network: CBS

The 1977 Country Music Association Awards, 11th Ceremony, was held on October 10, 1977, at the Grand Ole Opry House, Nashville, Tennessee, and was hosted by CMA Award winner Johnny Cash.

== Winners and nominees ==
Winners in Bold.

Entertainer of the Year	Album of the Year
**Ronnie Milsap**; Merle Haggard; Waylon Jennings; Dolly Parton; Kenny Rogers	**Ronnie Milsap Live — Ronnie Milsap**; I Don't Want to Have to Marry You — Jim Ed Brown and Helen Cornelius; I Remember Patsy — Loretta Lynn; Kenny Rogers — Kenny Rogers; Ol' Waylon — Waylon Jennings
Male Vocalist of the Year	Female Vocalist of the Year
**Ronnie Milsap**; Larry Gatlin; Waylon Jennings; Kenny Rogers; Don Williams	**Crystal Gayle**; Emmylou Harris; Loretta Lynn; Barbara Mandrell; Dolly Parton
Vocal Group of the Year	Vocal Duo of the Year
**Statler Brothers**; Asleep at the Wheel; Dave & Sugar; Eagles; Oak Ridge Boys	**Jim Ed Brown and Helen Cornelius**; Bill Anderson and Mary Lou Turner; Waylon Jennings and Willie Nelson; George Jones and Tammy Wynette; Conway Twitty and Loretta Lynn
Single of the Year	Song of the Year
**"Lucille" — Kenny Rogers**; "It Was Almost Like a Song" — Ronnie Milsap; "Luckenbach, Texas (Back to the Basics of Love)" — Waylon Jennings; "Margaritaville" — Jimmy Buffett; "Southern Nights" — Glen Campbell	**"Lucille" — Roger Bowling, Hal Bynum**; "(I'm A) Stand by My Woman Man" — Kent Robbins; "It Was Almost Like a Song" — Hal David, Archie Jordan; "Luckenbach, Texas (Back to the Basics of Love)" — Bobby Emmons, Chips Moman; "Southern Nights" — Allen Toussaint
Instrumental Group of the Year	Instrumentalist of the Year
**The Original Texas Playboys**; Asleep at the Wheel; The Charlie Daniels Band; Danny Davis and the Nashville Brass; Marshall Tucker Band	**Roy Clark**; Chet Atkins; Johnny Gimble; Charlie McCoy; Hargus "Pig" Robbins

== Hall of Fame ==
Country Music Hall of Fame Inductees
- Merle Travis
