= Georgia Keeps Pulling on My Ring (album) =

Studio album by Conway Twitty
- Released: 1978
- Recorded: 1972–1977
- Genre: Country
- Label: MCA Records
- Producer: Owen Bradley

Conway Twitty chronology
I've Already Loved You in My Mind (1977)	Georgia Keeps Pulling on My Ring (1978)	Conway (1978)

Singles from Georgia Keeps Pulling on My Ring
- 1. "Georgia Keeps Pulling on My Ring" Released: October 1977; 2. "Grandest Lady of Them All" Released: 1978

Georgia Keeps Pulling on My Ring is the thirty-eighth studio album by American country music singer Conway Twitty. The album was released in 1978, by MCA Records.

== Track listing ==
No.	Title	Writer(s)	Length
1.	"Georgia Keeps Pulling on My Ring"	David Wilkins, Tim Marshall	3:18
2.	"Honky Tonk Song"	Mel Tillis, Buck Peddy	2:41
3.	"Let It Ring"	David Barnes	2:54
4.	"Yours to Hurt Tomorrow"	Peggy Forman	2:34
5.	"She Loves Me"	L. E. White, Shiri Milete	2:45
6.	"The Grandest Lady of Them All"	Mel McDaniel, Bob Morrison	3:16
7.	"Mabellene"	Chuck Berry	2:36
8.	"I've Never Loved You More"	Raymond Smith	2:20
9.	"Victim of My Needs"	John Riggs	2:32
10.	"I Never Did Quite Get Over You"	Monk Gentry	2:38

== Charts ==
Chart (1978)	Peak position
US Top Country Albums (Billboard)	13
