= That Was Yesterday =

That Was Yesterday may refer to:

- "That Was Yesterday" (Donna Fargo song)
- "That Was Yesterday" (Foreigner song)
