= I've Already Loved You in My Mind (album) =

Studio album by Conway Twitty
- Released: 1977
- Recorded: 1977
- Genre: Country
- Length: 29:25
- Label: MCA Records
- Producer: Owen Bradley

Conway Twitty chronology
Play, Guitar Play (1977)	I've Already Loved You in My Mind (1977)	Georgia Keeps Pulling on My Ring (1978)

Singles from I've Already Loved You in My Mind
- 1. "I've Already Loved You in My Mind" Released: July 1977

I've Already Loved You in My Mind is the thirty seventh studio album by American country music singer Conway Twitty. The album was released in 1977, by MCA Records.

== Track listing ==
All tracks are written by Conway Twitty, except where noted.

No.	Title	Writer(s)	Length
1.	"I've Already Loved You in My Mind"		2:45
2.	"Judge of Hearts"		2:24
3.	"Talkin' 'Bout You"		3:46
4.	"I'm Used to Losing You"		2:14
5.	"The Reason Why I'm Here"		3:20
6.	"My First Country Song"		2:53
7.	"Leona"	Cindy Walker	3:15
8.	"I Changed My Mind"		2:57
9.	"Lord Make Her Want to Stay"	L. E. White	3:06
10.	"Come See About Me"		2:45
Total length:			29:25

== Charts ==
Chart (1977)	Peak position
US Top Country Albums (Billboard)	4
