= All This Time =

All This Time may refer to:

- All This Time (Heartless Bastards album), 2006
- All This Time (Sting album), a 2001 live album and concert film by Sting
- "All This Time" (Drax Project song), 2019
- "All This Time" (Michelle McManus song), 2003
- "All This Time" (Britt Nicole song), 2012
- "All This Time" (Sting song), 1991
- "All This Time" (Tiffany song), 1988
- "All This Time (Pick-Me-Up Song)", a song by Maria Mena from Cause and Effect
- "All This Time", a song by OneRepublic from their 2009 album Waking Up
- "All This Time", a song by Louis Tomlinson from his 2022 album Faith in the Future
- All This Time, a 1996 multimedia CD-ROM featuring the music of Sting
- "All This Time", a 2025 song by Sonny Fodera and Jazzy

== See also ==
- After All This Time (disambiguation)
