= What Did I Promise Her Last Night =

Single by Mel Tillis

from the album Love's Troubled Waters
- B-side: "Woman, You Should Be In The Movies"
- Released: November 1977
- Recorded: March 1977
- Genre: Country
- Length: 2:57
- Label: MCA
- Songwriter(s): Ronald McCown; Wayne Walker
- Producer(s): Jimmy Bowen

Mel Tillis singles chronology
| "I Got the Hoss" (1977) | "What Did I Promise Her Last Night" (1977) | "I Believe in You" (1978) |

"What Did I Promise Her Last Night" is a song recorded by American country music artist Mel Tillis. It was released in November 1977 as the second and final single from the album Love's Troubled Waters. The song was written by Ronald McCown and Wayne Walker.

== Content ==
The song is about a middle-aged married man who regrets his one-night stand and sexual encounter with a woman he had just met the previous evening in a bar. As he leaves their hotel room and drives home, he senses that she has had a string of failed relationships and one-night stands and wonders to himself if he could have been the one to provide her the lasting relationship she had been longing for.

== Chart performance ==
The single peaked at No. 4 in February 1978 on the Billboard Hot Country Singles chart, and No. 2 on the Canadian RPM Country Singles chart about the same time.

| Chart (1977–1978) | Peak position |
|---|---|
| Canadian RPM Country Tracks | 2 |
| US Hot Country Songs (Billboard) | 4 |
