= A Whole Lotta Things to Sing About =

Single by Charley Pride

from the album She's Just an Old Love Turned Memory
- B-side: "Hardest Part of Livin's Loving Me"
- Released: August 1976
- Genre: Country
- Length: 2:43
- Label: RCA Victor
- Songwriter: Ben Peters
- Producers: Jerry Bradley; Charley Pride

Charley Pride singles chronology
"My Eyes Can Only See as Far as You" (1976)	"A Whole Lotta Things to Sing About" (1976)	"She's Just an Old Love Turned Memory" (1977)

"A Whole Lotta Things to Sing About" is a song written by Ben Peters, and recorded by American country music artist Charley Pride. It was released in August 1976 as the first single from his album She's Just an Old Love Turned Memory. The song peaked at number 2 on the Billboard Hot Country Singles chart. It also reached number 1 on the RPM Country Tracks chart in Canada.

== Chart performance ==
Chart (1976)	Peak position
US Hot Country Songs (Billboard)	2
Canadian RPM Country Tracks	1
