= The Games That Daddies Play =

Single by Conway Twitty

from the album Greatest Hits Vol. 2
- B-side: "There's More Love In The Arms You're Leaving"
- Released: August 14, 1976
- Recorded: October 8, 1975
- Studio: Bradley's Barn, Mount Juliet, Tennessee
- Genre: Country
- Length: 3:05
- Label: MCA 40601
- Songwriter(s): Conway Twitty
- Producer(s): Owen Bradley

Conway Twitty singles chronology
"After All the Good Is Gone" (1976)	"The Games That Daddies Play" (1976)	"I Can't Believe She Gives It All to Me" (1976)

"The Games That Daddies Play" is a song written and recorded by American country music artist Conway Twitty. It was released in August 14, 1976 as the first single from his Greatest Hits 2 compilation album. The song was Twitty's 17th No. 1 hit on the Billboard Hot Country Singles chart in October 1976. Its one-week atop the chart was part of an 11-week run in the Hot Country Singles chart's top 40.

== Content ==
The song talks about a 7-year-old boy raised by a single mother, who one day asks her if he can go on an overnight camping trip with one of his friends, Billy Parker, whose father invited him and will be the chaperone. He wants to go in order to participate in "games that daddies play" – traditional father-son activities such as hiking, fishing and having man-to-man conversations.

His mother cries at the request, realizing that her son is asking a much deeper question – that being where his own father is in his life. She realizes that she has to tell her son the truth – both son and mother are victims of "another kind of game that daddies play", in his case his father abandoning the family six years earlier.

== Chart performance ==
Chart (1976)	Peak position
US Hot Country Songs (Billboard)	1
Canadian RPM Country Tracks	1
