= Ain't No California =

Single by Mel Tillis

from the album I Believe in You
- B-side: "What Comes Natural to a Fool"
- Released: August 1978
- Recorded: December 12, 1977
- Genre: Country
- Length: 3:35
- Label: MCA 40946
- Songwriter(s): Sterling Whipple
- Producer(s): Jimmy Bowen

Mel Tillis singles chronology
"I Believe in You" (1978)	"Ain't No California" (1978)	"Send Me Down to Tucson" (1979)

"Ain't No California" is a song written by Sterling Whipple, and recorded by American country music artist Mel Tillis. It was released in August 1978 as the second single from the album I Believe in You. The song reached #4 on the Billboard Hot Country Singles & Tracks chart.

== Chart performance ==
Chart (1978)	Peak position
US Hot Country Songs (Billboard)	4
Canadian RPM Country Tracks	2
