= Send Me Down to Tucson =

Single by Mel Tillis

from the album Are You Sincere
- B-side: "Charlie's Angel"
- Released: January 13, 1979
- Recorded: December 1978
- Studio: Glaser Sound (Nashville, Tennessee)
- Genre: Country
- Length: 3:35
- Label: MCA
- Songwriter(s): Snuff Garrett, Cliff Crofford
- Producer(s): Jimmy Bowen

Mel Tillis singles chronology
"Ain't No California" (1978)	"Send Me Down to Tucson" (1979)	"Coca-Cola Cowboy" (1979)

"Send Me Down to Tucson" is a song recorded by American country music artist Mel Tillis. It was released in January 1979 as the first single from the album Are You Sincere. The song reached #2 on the Billboard Hot Country Singles & Tracks chart. The song was written by Snuff Garrett and Cliff Crofford.

== Charts ==
=== Weekly charts ===
Chart (1979)	Peak position
US Hot Country Songs (Billboard)	2
Canadian RPM Country Tracks	4

=== Year-end charts ===
Chart (1979)	Position
US Hot Country Songs (Billboard)	30
