= I Believe in You (Mel Tillis song) =

Single by Mel Tillis

from the album I Believe in You
- B-side: "She Don't Trust You Daddy"
- Released: April 1978
- Recorded: 1977
- Genre: Country
- Length: 2:25
- Label: MCA
- Songwriter(s): Buddy Cannon; Gene Dunlap
- Producer(s): Jimmy Bowen

Mel Tillis singles chronology
"What Did I Promise Her Last Night" (1977)	"I Believe in You" (1978)	"Ain't No California" (1978)

"I Believe in You" is a song written by Gene Dunlap and Buddy Cannon, and recorded by American country music artist Mel Tillis. It was released in April 1978 as the first single and title track from the album I Believe in You. The song was Tillis' fourth number one on the country chart. "I Believe in You" stayed at number one for one week and spent a total of fourteen weeks on the country chart. It was also recorded by Engelbert Humperdinck on his 1979 album "This Moment In Time".

== Chart performance ==
Chart (1978)	Peak position
US Hot Country Songs (Billboard)	1
US Adult Contemporary (Billboard)	44
Canadian RPM Country Tracks	1
