= Blind in Love =

Single by Mel Tillis

from the album Me and Pepper
- B-side: "Black Jack, Water Back"
- Released: September 29, 1979
- Recorded: July 1979
- Studio: Glaser Sound (Nashville, Tennessee)
- Genre: Country
- Length: 3:57
- Label: Elektra
- Songwriter(s): Bob Corbin
- Producer(s): Jimmy Bowen

Mel Tillis singles chronology
| "Coca-Cola Cowboy" (1979) | "Blind in Love" (1979) | "Lying Time Again" (1979) |

"Blind in Love" is a song written by Bob Corbin, and recorded by American country music artist Mel Tillis. It was released in September 1979 as the first single from the album Me and Pepper. The song reached #6 on the Billboard Hot Country Singles & Tracks chart.

== Chart performance ==
| Chart (1979) | Peak position |
|---|---|
| US Hot Country Songs (Billboard) | 6 |
| Canadian RPM Country Tracks | 16 |
