= On the Road (Dick Damron song) =

Single by Dick Damron

from the album Soldier of Fortune
- Released: 1976
- Genre: Country
- Label: Marathon
- Songwriter(s): Dick Damron

Dick Damron singles chronology
"Mother, Love and Country" (1975)	"On the Road" (1976)	"Good Ol' Fashion Memories" (1976)

"On the Road" is a single by Canadian country music artist Dick Damron. Released in 1976, it was the second single from his album Soldier of Fortune. The song reached number one on the RPM Country Tracks chart in Canada in March 1976.

== Chart performance ==
Chart (1976)	Peak position
Canadian RPM Country Tracks	1
Canadian RPM Adult Contemporary	3
