= Lying Time Again =

Single by Mel Tillis

from the album Me and Pepper
- B-side: "Fooled Around and Fell in Love"
- Released: January 19, 1980
- Recorded: July 1979
- Studio: Glaser Sound (Nashville, Tennessee)
- Genre: Country
- Length: 3:10
- Label: Elektra
- Songwriter(s): Chance Walker
- Producer(s): Jimmy Bowen

Mel Tillis singles chronology
"Blind in Love" (1979)	"Lying Time Again" (1980)	"Your Body Is an Outlaw" (1980)

"Lying Time Again" is a song written by Chance Walker, and recorded by American country music artist Mel Tillis. It was released in January 1980 as the second single from his 1979 album Me and Pepper. The song reached No. 6 on the Billboard Hot Country Singles & Tracks chart.

== Chart performance ==
Chart (1980)	Peak position
US Hot Country Songs (Billboard)	6
Canadian RPM Country Tracks	12
