= Vanessa Grant =

Canadian writer

- Born: December 7, 1946
- Died: April 26, 2023 (aged 76); Nanaimo, BC
- Occupation: Novelist
- Writing career
- Period: 1985 - 2001
- Genre: Romantic novel

Vanessa Grant was a Canadian writer of romance novels, having had 29 published from 1985 to 2001. Her books have been translated into 15 languages and she has over 10 million books in print. While she wrote under the name "Vanessa Grant" her full name was "Vanessa Grant Oltmann."

In 1997 she wrote a manual of writing: Writing Romance and became an international lecturer.

== Biography ==
Grant wrote 29 romance novels from 1985 to 2001. Her books have been translated into 15 languages and she has over 10 million books in print. In 1997 she wrote a manual of writing: Writing Romance.

Grant became an international lecturer who has given workshops to writers' groups in Canada and the United States. In August 2001 she was the featured speaker at the Romance Writers of Australia and Romance Writers of New Zealand's annual conferences.

== Bibliography ==
=== Single novels ===
- Pacific Disturbance (1985)
- Storm (1985)
- Shadows (1986)
- The Chauvinist (1987)
- Stranded Heart (1988)
- Taking Chances (1989)
- Awakening Dreams (1989)
- Wild Passage (1989)
- So Much for Dreams (1990)
- The Touch of Love (1990)
- Angela's Affair (1991)
- Hidden Memories (1992)
- Catalina's Lover (1992)
- Nothing Less Than Love (1992)
- After All This Time (1992)
- Strangers by Day (1993)
- Dance of Seduction (1993)
- Yesterday's Vows (1994)
- The Moon Lady's Lover (1994)
- If You Loved Me (1999)
- The Colors of Love (2000)
- Seeing Stars (2001)
- Think About Love (2001)

=== Jenny & Georgina series ===
1. Jenny's Turn (1987)
2. Stray Lady (1987)

=== MacAvoy series ===
1. Takeover Man (1988)
2. One Secret Too Many (1990)

=== Gabriola Island series ===
1. With Strings Attached (1991)
2. When Love Returns (1991)

=== Non fiction ===
- Writing Romance (1997)

== References and sources ==
- Vanessa Grant's official website
