= Good Woman Blues =

Single by Mel Tillis

from the album Love Revival
- B-side: "You Can't Trust a Crazy Man"
- Released: September 1976
- Genre: Country
- Length: 2:51
- Label: MCA
- Songwriter(s): Ken McDuffie
- Producer(s): Mel Tillis, John Virgin

Mel Tillis singles chronology
"Come on Home" (1976)	"Good Woman Blues" (1976)	"Heart Healer" (1976)

"Good Woman Blues" is a song written by Ken McDuffie and recorded by American country music artist Mel Tillis. It was released in September 1976 as the second single from the album Love Revival. The song was Tillis' second number one on the country chart. The single stayed at number one for two weeks and spent a total of twelve weeks on the country chart.

== Chart performance ==
Chart (1976)	Peak position
US Hot Country Songs (Billboard)	1
Canadian RPM Country Tracks	1
