= I'll Do It All Over Again =

Single by Crystal Gayle

from the album Crystal
- B-side: "I'm Not So Far Away"
- Released: March 26, 1977
- Genre: Country
- Length: 2:57
- Label: United Artists
- Songwriter(s): Bob McDill, Wayland Holyfield
- Producer(s): Allen Reynolds

Crystal Gayle singles chronology
| "You Never Miss a Real Good Thing (Till He Says Goodbye)" (1977) | "I'll Do It All Over Again" (1977) | "Don't It Make My Brown Eyes Blue" (1977) |

"I'll Do It All Over Again" is a song written by Bob McDill and Wayland Holyfield, and recorded by American country music artist Crystal Gayle. It was released in March 1977 as the third single from the album Crystal. The song reached number 2 on the Billboard Hot Country Singles & Tracks chart.

== Charts ==
=== Weekly charts ===
| Chart (1977) | Peak position |
|---|---|
| US Hot Country Songs (Billboard) | 2 |
| Canadian RPM Country Tracks | 3 |

=== Year-end charts ===
| Chart (1977) | Position |
|---|---|
| US Hot Country Songs (Billboard) | 22 |

== Covers ==
Later in 1977, Ava Barber released a cover of the song.
