= I Got the Hoss =

Single by Mel Tillis

from the album Love's Troubled Waters
- B-side: "It's Been a Long Time"
- Released: August 13, 1977
- Genre: Country
- Length: 2:54
- Label: MCA
- Songwriter: Gerald House
- Producer: Jimmy Bowen

Mel Tillis singles chronology
| "Burning Memories" (1977) | "I Got the Hoss" (1977) | "What Did I Promise Her Last Night" (1977) |

"I Got the Hoss" is a song written by Gerald House, and recorded by American country music artist Mel Tillis. It was released in August 1977 as the first single from the album Love's Troubled Waters. The song reached #3 on the Billboard Hot Country Singles & Tracks chart.

== Chart performance ==
| Chart (1977) | Peak position |
|---|---|
| US Hot Country Songs (Billboard) | 3 |
| Canadian RPM Country Tracks | 3 |
