= Ronnie Sessions =

American country music singer (1948–2025)

- Born: December 7, 1948
- Origin: Henryetta, Oklahoma, United States
- Died: May 13, 2025 (aged 76) Cumberland City, Tennessee, United States
- Genres: Country
- Occupation: Singer
- Instrument: Vocals
- Years active: 1972–1986
- Labels: MGM, MCA, Compleat

Ronnie Sessions (December 7, 1948 – May 13, 2025) was an American country music singer.

Sessions was born in Henryetta, Oklahoma, United States. Between 1972 and 1986, he recorded for MGM, MCA and Compleat. He also charted sixteen times on the Billboard Hot Country Songs chart, including the Top 20 hits "Wiggle Wiggle" and ""Me and Millie (Stompin' Grapes and Gettin' Silly)". Sessions got his start at age nine, when he performed on the "Cousin Herb's Trading Post Gang" Show in Bakersfield, California.

He died on May 13, 2025, at the age of 76 in Cumberland City, Tennessee, United States.

== Discography ==
=== Albums ===
Year	Album details	Peak chart positions
Year	Album details	US Country
1977	Ronnie Sessions: Label: MCA Records	41

=== Singles ===
Year	Single	Chart Positions	
Year	Single	US Country	CAN Country
1972	"Never Been to Spain"	36	38
1972	"Tossin' and Turnin'"	59	—
1973	"She Feels So Good I Hate to Put Her Down"	66	—
1973	"If That Back Door Could Talk"	87	—
1975	"Makin' Love"	61	—
1976	"Support Your Local Honky Tonks"	81	—
1976	"Wiggle Wiggle"	16	9
1977	"Me and Millie (Stompin' Grapes and Gettin' Silly)"	15	12
1977	"Ambush"	30	35
1977	"I Like to Be with You"	57	—
1978	"Cash on the Barrelhead"	72	—
1978	"I Never Go Around Mirrors"	96	—
1978	"Juliet and Romeo"	25	43
1979	"Do You Want to Fly"	94	63
1979	"Honky Tonkin'"	84	—
1986	"I Bought the Shoes That Just Walked Out on Me"	78	—
