= Roy Heinrich =

American singer-songwriter

- Born: Elroy Paul Heinrich, Jr. July 31, 1953 (age 73)
- Genres: Country music
- Occupations: Musician, songwriter
- Instruments: Vocals, guitar
- Years active: 1989–present

Roy Heinrich, born Elroy Paul Heinrich, Jr., July 31, 1953, is a country music singer and songwriter born in Houston, Texas. Heinrich began singing Country music in Los Angeles in 1989. After moving to Austin, Texas in the fall of 1992, Heinrich has established himself as Roots/Honky Tonk Country Music artist. He has participated in Austin's South by Southwest music festivals for several years.

In 1996 Heinrich released album Listen To Your Heart, which was reviewed in Country Standard Time as a "must" for fans of honky tonk music.

== Discography ==
=== Albums ===
- After All This Time, 1993 CD
- Listen To Your Heart, 1996 CD
- Smokey Night in a Bar, 1999 CD
- Playin' Favorites, 2002 CD
- All Night All Day, 2008 CD
