= Coca-Cola Cowboy =

Single by Mel Tillis

from the album Mr. Entertainer
- B-side: "Cottonmouth"
- Released: June 1979
- Recorded: April 1979
- Studio: Glaser Sound (Nashville, Tennessee)
- Genre: Country, Outlaw Country, Roots country, Classic Country
- Length: 3:22
- Label: MCA
- Songwriter(s): Steve Dorff; Sandy Pinkard; Sam Atchley; Bud Dain
- Producer(s): Jimmy Bowen

Mel Tillis singles chronology
"Send Me Down to Tucson" (1979)	"Coca-Cola Cowboy" (1979)	"Blind in Love" (1979)

"Coca-Cola Cowboy" is a song written by Steve Dorff, Sandy Pinkard, Sam Atchley, and Bud Dain, and recorded by American country music artist Mel Tillis. It was released in June 1979 as the first single from the album Mr. Entertainer. The song was featured in the film, Every Which Way but Loose, starring Clint Eastwood, and the TV movie Bandit Goes Country (which also had Tillis in the film), starring Brian Bloom. It was Tillis' fifth number one on the U.S. country singles chart, where it spent one week at the top and a total of eleven weeks on the chart.

When Tillis performs the song in Every Which Way but Loose, one line of the lyrics is changed. The line "You've got an Eastwood smile and Robert Redford hair," is changed to "You've got a sexist smile and Robert Redford hair," probably to avoid referencing the film's star Clint Eastwood, who was in the audience as part of the film.

== Charts ==
=== Weekly charts ===
Chart (1979)	Peak position
US Hot Country Songs (Billboard)	1
Canadian RPM Country Tracks	3

=== Year-end charts ===
Chart (1979)	Position
US Hot Country Songs (Billboard)	22
