= Wiggle Wiggle (Ronnie Sessions song) =

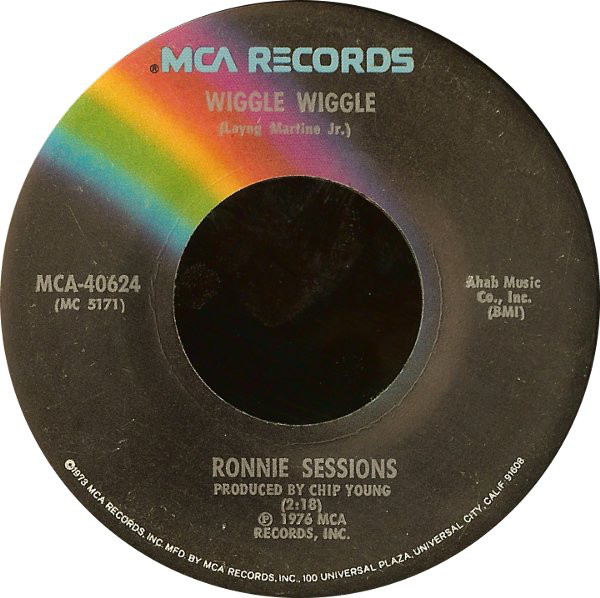
- Side A of the US single

Single by Ronnie Sessions

from the album Ronnie Sessions
- B-side: "Baby, Please Don't Stone Me Anymore"
- Released: December 1976
- Recorded: 1976
- Genre: Folk, World, & Country
- Length: 2:18
- Label: MCA
- Songwriter: Layng Martine Jr.
- Producer: Chip Young

Ronnie Sessions singles chronology
"Support Your Local Honky Tonks" (1976)	"Wiggle Wiggle" (1976)	"Me And Millie (Stompin' Grapes And Gettin' Silly)" (1977)

"Wiggle Wiggle" is a song by Ronnie Sessions from his eponymous debut album, released in the fall of 1976. It was the first of four charting singles from the LP.

"Wiggle Wiggle" reached number 16 on the U.S. Billboard Country chart. On the Cash Box Country chart it spent two weeks at number 10. It performed even better in Canada, where it remained on the charts for six months, peaking at number 9 for two weeks.

== Chart history ==
Chart (1976–77)	Peak position
Canada RPM Country Tracks	9
US Hot Country Songs (Billboard)	16
US Cash Box Country Singles	10
US Record World Country	11
