= Dick Damron =

Canadian country music singer and songwriter (1934–2025)

- Born: Joseph Glenn Damron; March 22, 1934; Bentley, Alberta, Canada
- Died: March 29, 2025 (aged 91) Lacombe, Alberta, Canada
- Genres: Country
- Occupations: Singer, songwriter
- Instruments: Guitar, banjo, violin, blues harp
- Label: Broadland

Joseph Glenn "Dick" Damron (March 22, 1934 – March 29, 2025) was a Canadian country music singer and songwriter. Damron experimented with many musical styles in the country genre, including outlaw, rockabilly, and honky-tonk, as well as gospel. Over a recording career spanning 60 years he recorded more than 25 albums, received numerous country music awards, and was inducted into the International Country Music Hall Of Fame, in Beaumont, Texas.

== Early career ==
Dick Damron was born in Bentley, Alberta on March 22, 1934. Damron started his career performing in both rock and country bands, including the Musical Round-Up Gang (on CKRD radio, Red Deer) and the Nightriders. His recording career began in 1959 with his original 45 "Havin' a Party" / "Rockin' Baby". Then, in 1960 he recorded two LPs for his own label, Holiday. In 1961, he issued his first Nashville studio album on Quality Records, then had a Canadian #1 hit with "Hitchhiking" in 1963. He continued recording and touring throughout the 1960s, building up a growing fan base.

Damron had a breakthrough hit in 1970 with "Countryfied" for Apex records. He found further success throughout the 1970s with singles such as "Rise 'n' Shine", "The Long Green Line", "Mother, Love and Country", and "Susan Flowers".

In 1978 Damron signed his first major label contract and began recording for RCA. By this point he had become an established performer in the outlaw style and a well known songwriter. His most popular singles for RCA included "Silver and Shine", "Whisky Jack", "Honky Tonk Angels and Good Ol' Boys", and "Good Ol' Time Country Rock 'n' Roll".

Throughout the years Damron has performed at many notable shows and venues, including the Grand Ole Opry in Nashville (1972). He also toured Europe many times throughout the 1970s and 1980s, including a performance at the Wembley International Country Music Festival in London, England. He spent six seasons as the resident band at Howard Hughes' Desert Inn in Las Vegas from 1985 to 1991. He appeared on Canadian television networks CBC and CTV, and at a concert at the Calgary Stampede.

== Musical contacts ==
As a solo artist, Damron played alongside musicians including Jerry Reed and Buddy Emmons in Nashville sessions, and James Burton sitting in at a Las Vegas jam. His main backup group was the Stoney Creek Band, which featured Brian Richard, Sam Taylor, and Myron Szott. His songs have been covered by numerous artists, including Charlie Pride, George Hamilton IV, Wilf Carter, Carroll Baker, Gary Buck, Terry Carisse, Jimmy Arthur Ordge, Orval Prophet, and Rhythm Pals.

== Author ==
Damron wrote the fictional thrillers Rockabye Baby Blues and Pacific Coast Radio, and the autobiography The Legend and the Legacy.

== Death ==
Damron died in Lacombe, Alberta on March 29, 2025, at the age of 91.

== Awards ==
Damron won the Big Country award for top country music composer in 1976 and 1984, best male country singer award in the years 1976, 1977, 1978, and 1983. "Susan Flowers" was declared the Big Country best country single in 1997. He has won CCMA Awards as best male vocalist (1983), instrumentalist (1985), entertainer (1989), and for best single in 1984 ("Jesus, It's Me Again"). Between 1980 and 1983 he won the Texas Proud Award. He was inducted into the International Country Music Hall of Fame in 2001. Damron won seven BMI songwriter awards.

== Discography ==
=== Albums ===
Year	Album	Peak positions
Year	Album	CAN Country
1961 and 1963	The Nashville Sound of Dick Damron	—
1967	Canadiana Souvenir Album	—
1968	Dick Damron	—
1969	Lonesome City	—
1971	Countryfied	—
1973	The Cowboy and the Lady	—
1974	Northwest Rebellion	—
1975	Soldier of Fortune	—
1976	North Country Skyline	—
1978	Lost in the Music	12
1980	Life Story	—
1980	High on You	—
1981	The Best of Dick Damron	—
1982	Honky Tonk Angel	—
1984	Last Dance on Saturday Night	18
1987	Night Music	—
1987	Dick Damron	—
1989	The Legend and the Legacy	—
1992	Mirage	—
1993	Wings Upon the Wind: Christian Country Collection	—
1994	Touch the Sky: Christian Country Collection II	—
1995	Dick Damron: The Anthology	—
1997	Still Countrified	—
2002	Died and Gone to Mexico	—
2004	The Big Picture	—
2008	Farewell to Arms	—
2011	More Than Countryfied: The Early Recordings	—
2012	Lost in the Music: The Recordings	—

=== Singles ===
Year	Title	Peak chart positions		Album
Year	Title	CAN Country	CAN AC	Album
1959	"Gonna Have a Party"	—	—	Non-album songs
1960	"That's What I Call Livin'"	—	—	Non-album songs
1961	"I Guess That's Life"	—	—	Non-album songs
1961	"Little Sandy"	—	—	The Nashville Sound of Dick Damron
1962	"Times Like This"	—	—	The Nashville Sound of Dick Damron
1964	"Hitch Hikin'"	1	—	The Nashville Sound of Dick Damron
1970	"Countryfied"	1	—	Countryfied
1971	"Rise 'n' Shine"	1	—	Countryfied
1972	"The Long Green Line"	4	15	Countryfied
1973	"Walk a Country Mile"	—	27	Countryfied
1973	"Going Home to the Country"	19	—	Countryfied
1973	"The Prophet"	28	—	The Cowboy and the Lady
1974	"Bitter Sweet Songs"	2	—	The Cowboy and the Lady
1975	"Mother, Love and Country"	5	—	Soldier of Fortune
1976	"On the Road"	1	3	Soldier of Fortune
1976	"Good Ol' Fashion Memories"	3	—	Soldier of Fortune
1976	"Waylon's T-Shirt"	13	—	North Country Skyline
1977	"Susan Flowers"	1	—	North Country Skyline
1977	"Charing Cross Cowboys"	28	—	North Country Skyline
1978	"Whiskey Jack"	9	—	Lost in the Music
1978	"My Good Woman"	16	—	Lost in the Music
1978	"Silver and Shine"	7	—	High on You
1979	"High on You"	12	—	High on You
1979	"The Ballad of T.J.'s"	14	—	High on You
1980	"Dollars"	20	—	High on You
1981	"If You Need Me Lord"	29	—	The Best of Dick Damron
1981	"Mid-nite Flytes"	30	—	The Best of Dick Damron
1981	"Reunion"	9	—	Honky Tonk Angel
1982	"Honky Tonk Angels and Good Ol' Boys"	7	—	Honky Tonk Angel
1982	"Good Ol' Time Country Rock 'N' Roll"	9	—	Honky Tonk Angel
1982	"Jesus It's Me Again"	25	—	Honky Tonk Angel
1983	"I'm Not Ready for the Blues"	30	—	Dick Damron (1987)
1984	"A Little More Country Music"	22	—	Last Dance on Saturday Night
1984	"Riding Shotgun"	30	—	Last Dance on Saturday Night
1985	"Last Dance on Saturday Night"	28	—	Last Dance on Saturday Night
1986	"Masquerade"	35	—	Dick Damron (1987)
1987	"1955"	48	—	Dick Damron (1987)
1987	"You'd Still Be Here Today"	28	—	Dick Damron (1987)
1987	"Cinderella & the Gingerbread Man"	15	—	Dick Damron (1987)
1988	"St. Mary's Angel"	45	—	Dick Damron (1987)
1988	"Here We Go Again"	*	—	Dick Damron (1987)
1989	"The Legend and the Legacy"	34	—	The Legend and the Legacy
1989	"Ain't No Trains to Nashville"	20	—	The Legend and the Legacy
1990	"Midnite Cowboy Blues"	32	—	The Legend and the Legacy
1991	"Wild Horses"	14	—	The Legend and the Legacy

=== Singles with Ginny Mitchell ===
Year	Title	Peak positions	Album
Year	Title	CAN Country	Album
1985	"Falling in and Out of Love"	27	Non-album songs
1985	"Rise Against the Wind"	14	Non-album songs
