= She's Just an Old Love Turned Memory (album) =

Studio album by Charley Pride
- Released: March 1977
- Recorded: November 1976
- Studios: RCA Studio A, Nashville, Tennessee
- Genre: Country
- Label: RCA Victor
- Producers: Jerry Bradley; Charley Pride

Charley Pride chronology
Sunday Morning with Charley Pride (1976)	She's Just an Old Love Turned Memory (1977)	Someone Loves You Honey (1978)

Singles from She's Just an Old Just Love Turned Memory
- 1. "A Whole Lotta Things to Sing About" Released: August 1976; 2. "She's Just an Old Love Turned Memory" Released: January 1977; 3. "I'll Be Leaving Alone" Released: May 1977

She's Just an Old Love Turned Memory is the twenty-third studio album by American country music artist Charley Pride. It was released in March 1977 via RCA Victor Records and contained ten tracks. The record was co-produced by Jerry Bradley and Pride. It was Pride's twenty third studio recording in his career and spawned three singles: "A Whole Lotta Things to Sing About", "I'll Be Leaving Alone", and the title track. The album received positive reviews from critics and music publications.

== Background and content ==
At the beginning of his career, Charley Pride's musical sound was defined by a traditional country style. As his career progressed into the late 1970s, his style shifted more towards country pop arrangements. This style would be reflected in albums like She's Just an Old Love Turned Memory. The album was recorded mostly in November 1976 at the RCA Victor Studio, in Nashville, Tennessee. The sessions were co-produced by Jerry Bradley and Pride. The album contained a total of ten tracks. A cover of Glen Campbell's "Rhinestone Cowboy" appears on the album. The remainder of the project's material were new recordings, including the title track, "The Rose Is For Today" and "I Feel the Country Callin' Me."

== Release and reception ==
Professional ratings
Review scores
Source	Rating
AllMusic	4/5 stars

She's Just an Old Love Turned Memory was released in March 1977 on RCA Victor Records. It would be Pride's twenty third studio release. The album was distributed as a vinyl LP, containing five songs on both sides of the record. It was also issued as a cassette to specific markets. The album spent a total of 24 weeks on the Billboard Top Country Albums and peaked at number six in May 1977. It would also become his first studio release to reach a peak position on the UK Albums Chart, where it peaked at number 34 in 1977. The project received a positive review from Billboard magazine in their April 1977 issue. Writers praised the whole album, but were especially fond of the album's ballads which they believed to be "his strength." It would also receive a four star rating from Allmusic in later years.

A total of three singles were spawned from She's Just an Old Love Turned Memory. The first single released off the record was "A Whole Lotta Things to Sing About," in August 1976. It spent 15 weeks on the Billboard Hot Country Songs chart and reached the number two spot in October. The title track was released as the second single in January 1977. By March the single had topped the Billboard country songs list. The third and final single off the album was released in May 1977, "I'll Be Leaving Alone." It spent 14 weeks on the country chart and would peak at number one. All three singles would also reach number one on the RPM Country Singles chart in Canada.

== Track listings ==
=== Vinyl version ===
Side one
No.	Title	Writer(s)	Length
1.	"She's Just an Old Love Turned Memory"	John Schweers	2:32
2.	"Rhinestone Cowboy"	Larry Weiss	2:46
3.	"The Hunger"	Lee Fry	2:40
4.	"A Whole Lotta Things to Sing About"	Ben Peters	2:42
5.	"I Feel the Country Callin' Me"	Joe Richie	3:13

Side two
No.	Title	Writer(s)	Length
1.	"I'll Be Leaving Alone"	Wayland Holyfield; Dickey Lee	2:47
2.	"We Need Lovin'"	Bobby David; June Dussia	2:33
3.	"Country Music"	Don Feagin	2:28
4.	"The Rose Is for Today"	Schweers	3:19
5.	"Get Up Off Your Good Intentions"	David; Dussia	2:05

=== Cassette version ===
Side one
No.	Title	Writer(s)	Length
1.	"She's Just an Old Love Turned Memory"	Schweers	2:32
2.	"The Hunger"	Fry	2:40
3.	"A Whole Lotta Things to Sing About"	Peters	2:42
4.	"I Feel the Country Callin' Me"	Richie	3:13
5.	"Country Music"	Feagin	2:28

Side two
No.	Title	Writer(s)	Length
1.	"I'll Be Leaving Alone"	Holyfield; Lee	2:47
2.	"We Need Lovin'"	David; Dussia	2:33
3.	"The Rose Is for Today"	Schweers	3:19
4.	"Get Up Off Your Good Intentions"	David; Dussia	2:05
5.	"Rhinestone Cowboy"	Weiss	2:46

=== Digital version ===
She's Just an Old Love Turned Memory
No.	Title	Writer(s)	Length
1.	"She's Just an Old Love Turned Memory"	Schweers	2:35
2.	"Rhinestone Cowboy"	Weiss	2:48
3.	"The Hunger"	Fry	2:42
4.	"A Whole Lotta Things to Sing About"	Peters	2:43
5.	"I Feel the Country Callin' Me"	Richie	3:14
6.	"I'll Be Leaving Alone"	Holyfield; Lee	2:49
7.	"We Need Lovin'"	David; Dussia	2:35
8.	"Country Music"	Feagin	2:29
9.	"The Rose Is for Today"	Schweers	3:21
10.	"Get Up Off Your Good Intentions"	David; Dussia	2:06

== Personnel ==
All credits are adapted from the liner notes of She's Just an Old Love Turned Memory.

Musical and technical personnel

- Jerry Bradley – producer
- The Jordanaires – background vocals
- The Nashville Edition – background vocals
- Charley Pride – lead vocals, producer

== Charts ==
=== Weekly charts ===
Chart (1977)	Peak position
UK Albums (Official Charts)	34
US Top Country Albums (Billboard)	6

=== Year-end charts ===
Chart (1977)	Position
US Top Country Albums (Billboard)	20

== Release history ==
Region	Date	Format	Label	Ref.
Australia	March 1977	Vinyl	RCA Victor Records	
Canada	March 1977	Vinyl	RCA Victor Records	
United Kingdom	March 1977	Vinyl	RCA Victor Records	
United Kingdom	March 1977	Cassette	RCA Victor Records	
United States	March 1977	Vinyl	RCA Victor Records	
United States	2010s	Sony Music Entertainment	Digital; streaming	
