= Susan Flowers =

Single by Dick Damron

from the album A Thousand Songs of Glory
- Released: 1977
- Genre: Country
- Label: Condor
- Songwriter(s): Dick Damron

Dick Damron singles chronology
"Waylon's T-Shirt" (1976)	"Susan Flowers" (1977)	"Charing Cross Cowboys" (1977)

"Susan Flowers" is a single by Canadian country music artist Dick Damron. Released in 1977, it was the second single from his album A Thousand Songs of Glory. The song reached number one on the RPM Country Tracks chart in Canada in August 1977.

== Chart performance ==
Chart (1977)	Peak position
Canadian RPM Country Tracks	1
