= Ronnie Milsap Live =

Live album by Ronnie Milsap
- Released: 1976
- Genre: Country
- Label: RCA Victor
- Producers: Tom Collins, Ronnie Milsap

Ronnie Milsap Live is the first live album by American country music artist Ronnie Milsap. It was recorded at the Grand Ole Opry House in Nashville, Tennessee, in 1976, the same year Milsap became a member of the Grand Ole Opry, and released that same year. Country music disc jockey and television host Ralph Emery introduced Milsap at the concert and also wrote the album's liner notes.

The album spent 24 weeks on the Billboard Top Country Albums chart, peaking at No. 2.

Ronnie Milsap Live won the Country Music Association Award for Album of the Year in 1977, Milsap's second win in that category. In 1979, it was certified Gold by the Recording Industry Association of America for US shipments exceeding 500,000.

== Track listing ==
1. Introduction — Ralph Emery
2. Pure Love (3:27)
3. Medley: I Hate You/That Girl Who Waits on Tables (3:28)
4. Welcome — Talk by Ronnie Milsap
5. Medley: (I'm A) Stand By My Woman Man/What Goes On When the Sun Goes Down/Daydreams About Night Things (3:28)
6. Busy Makin' Plans (2:50)
7. Kaw-Liga (5:42)
8. Country Cookin' (5:40)
9. I Can Almost See Houston From Here (3:21)
10. (After Sweet Memories) Play Born to Lose Again (2:56)
11. Music Style Medley: Daydreams About Night Things/Cattle Call (2:54)
12. Let My Love Be Your Pillow (2:57)
13. (I'd Be) A Legend in My Time (2:53)
14. Honky Tonk Women (4:15)

== Personnel ==
- Ronnie Milsap — vocals, piano
- Shane Keister — ARP
- Charlie McCoy — harmonica, vibes
- Stephen Holt — drums
- Jimmy Capps — rhythm guitar
- Johnny Cobb – bass
- Dicky Overbey — steel guitar
- Jerry McCoy, Jack Watkins — guitar
- Jim Buchanan, Tommy Williams — fiddle
- The Nashville Edition — vocal accompaniment

== Charts ==
=== Weekly charts ===
Chart (1977)	Peak position
US Top Country Albums (Billboard)	2

=== Year-end charts ===
Chart (1977)	Position
US Top Country Albums (Billboard)	15

== Certifications ==
Region	Certification	Certified units/sales
United States (RIAA)	Gold	500,000^{^}
^{^} Shipments figures based on certification alone.
