= I've Already Loved You in My Mind =

Single by Conway Twitty

from the album I've Already Loved You in My Mind
- B-side: "I've Changed My Mind"
- Released: July 1977
- Recorded: May 2, 1977
- Studio: Bradley's Barn, Mount Juliet, Tennessee
- Genre: Country
- Length: 2:47
- Label: MCA
- Songwriter(s): Conway Twitty
- Producer(s): Owen Bradley

Conway Twitty singles chronology
"Play Guitar Play" (1977)	"I've Already Loved You in My Mind" (1977)	"Georgia Keeps Pulling on My Ring" (1977)

"I've Already Loved You in My Mind" is a song written and recorded by American country music artist Conway Twitty. It was released in July 1977 as the first single and title track from the album I've Already Loved You in My Mind. The song was Twitty's 20th number-one country hit in the United States. The single stayed at number one for a single week and spent a total of 11 weeks on the country chart.

== Charts ==
=== Weekly charts ===
Chart (1977)	Peak position
US Hot Country Songs (Billboard)	1
Canadian RPM Country Tracks	4

=== Year-end charts ===
Chart (1977)	Position
US Hot Country Songs (Billboard)	20
