= Little David Wilkins =

American singer-songwriter

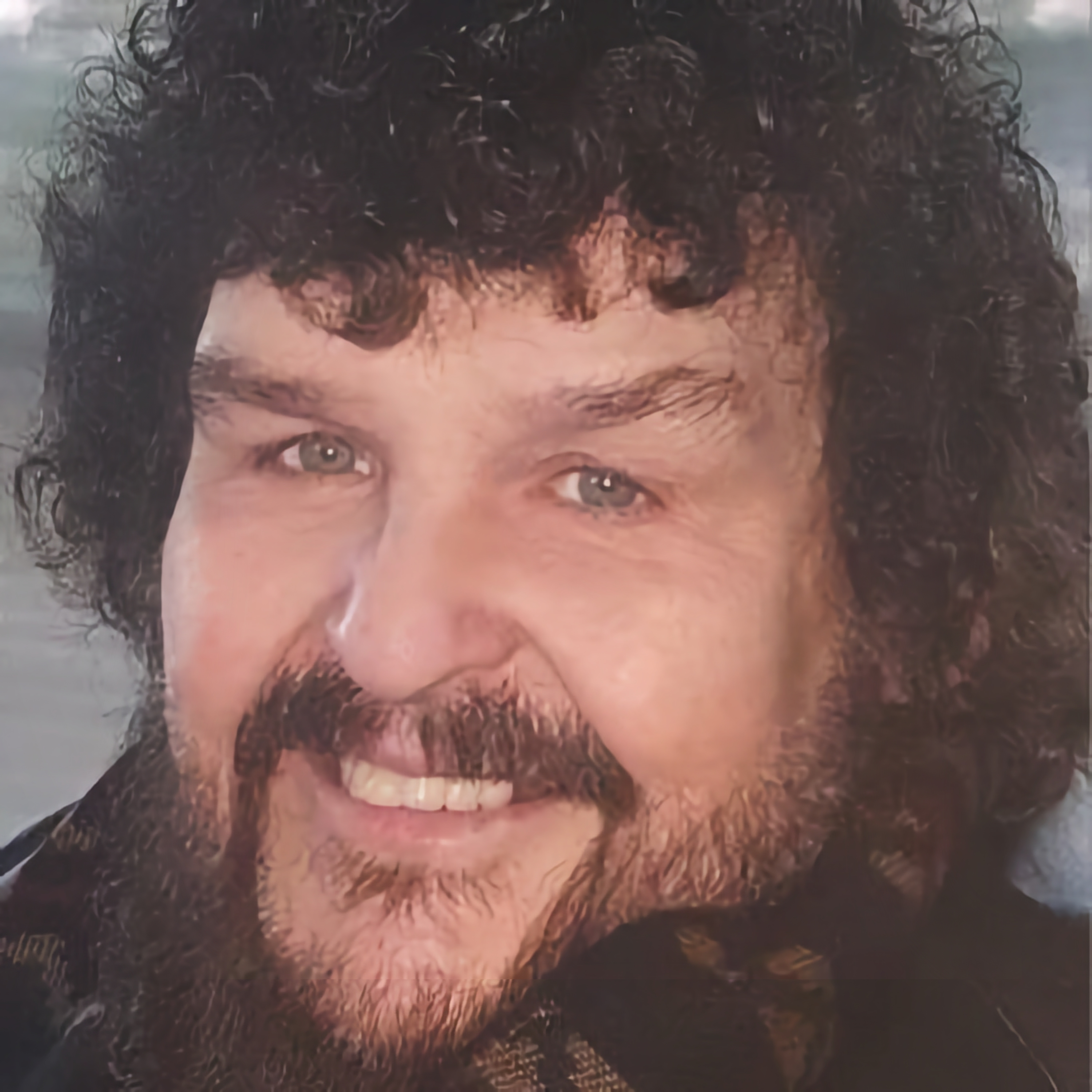

Background information
- Born: May 18, 1940 (age 85); Parsons, Tennessee
- Genres: Country
- Occupation: Singer
- Instruments: Vocals, piano
- Years active: 1969-present
- Labels: Sun Records; Plantation Records; MCA; Charly Records Sun/Plantation subsidiary Playboy; Epic [16th Avenue Records][BearFamily Records Sun Records Vol #6]

David Wilkins, known professionally as Little David Wilkins (born May 18, 1940) is an American country music singer, songwriter, and pianist. Between 1969 and 1977, he recorded for MCA Records with whom he released his greatest number of chart hits.

Wilkins performed at a nightclub in Parsons, Tennessee during the 1960s. He rose to fame as the writer of many songs that were performed by other artists; his first was Brenda Lee's 1966 hit single "Coming on Strong". Other artists who have recorded his songs include Charley Pride, Billy "Crash" Craddock, Jack Greene, Leroy Van Dyke, Stonewall Jackson, Sonny James, Ronnie Dove, Barbara Mandrell, and Percy Sledge.

He was also the inspiration behind Elvis Presley's 1975 single "T-R-O-U-B-L-E".

One of Wilkins' songs, "Georgia Keeps Pulling on My Ring", was later covered by Conway Twitty.

After his success in songwriting for other artists brought him attention, Wilkins began recording his own songs, beginning with a 1969 single "Just Blow In His Ear".

In 2025 at age 85, Wilkins released a new song to all streaming outlets called "Bud Light Blues," which references the Dylan Mulvaney controversy relating to the Bud Light boycott.

== Discography ==
=== Albums ===
Title	Details	Peak chart positions
Title	Details	US Country
Little David Wilkins	Release date: 1974; Label: MCA Records	31
King of All the Taverns	Release date: 1976; Label: MCA Records	48
Top 10 Hits Plus 3	Release date: April 12, 2004; Label: Aaron Records	—
Boogie Woogie Man	Release date: July 7, 2005; Label: Circle G Records	—
New Horizons	Release date: July 4, 2006; Label: Circle G Records	—
Farther Down the Road	Release date: July 4, 2014; Label: JAM Records	

=== Singles ===
Year	Single	Chart Positions		Album
Year	Single	US Country	CAN Country	Album
1969	"Just Blow in His Ear" (as David Wilkins)	54	—	singles only
1973	"Love in the Back Seat"	63	—	singles only
1973	"Too Much Hold Back"	41	60	Little David Wilkins
1974	"Georgia Keeps Pulling on My Ring"	50	—	Little David Wilkins
1974	"Not Tonight"	77	—	Little David Wilkins
1974	"Whoever Turned You On Forgot to Turn You Off"	14	8	Little David Wilkins
1975	"One Monkey Don't Stop No Show"	11	48	King of All the Taverns
1976	"The Good Night Special"	18	14	King of All the Taverns
1976	"Disco-Tex"/"Half the Way In, Half the Way Out"	75	—	King of All the Taverns
1976	"The Greatest Show on Earth"	88	—	King of All the Taverns
1977	"He'll Play the Music (But You Can't Make Him Dance)"	21	36	singles only
1977	"Is Everybody Ready"	60	—	singles only
1977	"Agree to Disagree"	21	32	singles only
1978	"Don't Stop the Music (You're Playing My Song)"	68	—	singles only
1978	"Motel Rooms"	74	—	singles only
1986	"Lady in Distress"	79	—	singles only
1987	"Butterbeans" (with Johnny Russell)	72	—	singles only
1987	"It's Quittin' Time" (with Johnny Russell)	—	—	singles only
