= Say You'll Stay Until Tomorrow =

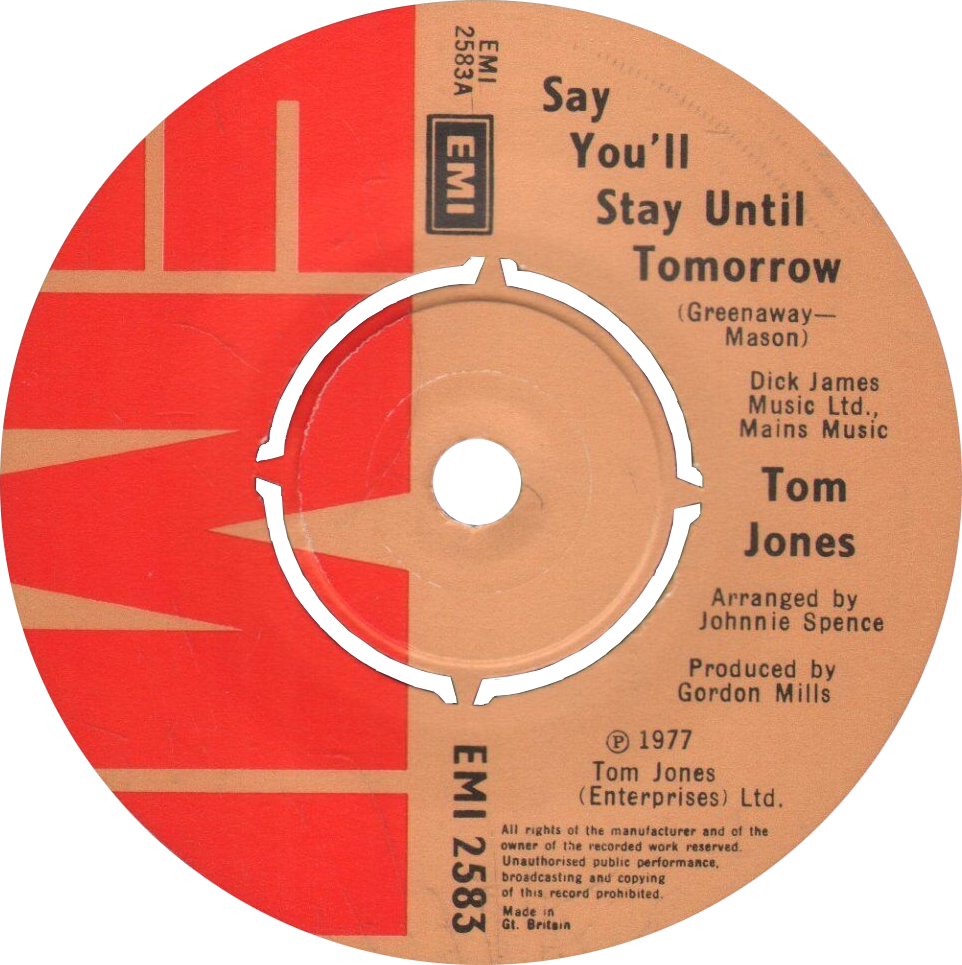
- One of side-A labels of the UK single

Single by Tom Jones

from the album Say You'll Stay Until Tomorrow
- B-side: "Lady Lay"
- Released: January 1977
- Genre: Country
- Length: 3:32
- Label: EMI; Epic (North America)
- Songwriters: Roger Greenaway, Barry Mason
- Producer: Gordon Mills

Tom Jones singles chronology
"Memories Don't Leave, But People Do" (1976)	"Say You'll Stay Until Tomorrow" (1977)	"Papa" (1977)

"Say You'll Stay Until Tomorrow" is a 1977 single written by Roger Greenaway & Barry Mason and performed by Tom Jones. The song was Jones's first and highest-charting country music hit. Spending ten weeks within the Top 40 of the Billboard Hot Country Singles (now Hot Country Songs) chart, "Say You'll Stay Until Tomorrow" went to number one for one week on 26 February 1977.

The song also peaked at number fifteen on the Billboard Hot 100, and was Jones's last single to reach the top 40 until 1988. It was also a Number One hit in Canada, reaching the top of the RPM country and easy-listening charts. In Tom Jones's native United Kingdom, it reached number 40, and would be his last to reach the top 40 there until 1987.

== Charts ==
=== Weekly charts ===
Chart (1977)	Peak position
Australia (Kent Music Report)	15
Canadian RPM Adult Contemporary	1
Canadian RPM Country Tracks	1
Canadian RPM Top Singles	12
New Zealand (Recorded Music NZ)	1
UK Singles (Official Charts)	40
US Cashbox	15
US Billboard Hot 100	15
US Adult Contemporary (Billboard)	3
US Hot Country Songs (Billboard)	1

=== Year-end charts ===
Chart (1977)	Rank
Australia (Kent Music Report)	73
Canada RPM Top Singles	115
New Zealand	11
US Billboard Hot 100	109
US Adult Contemporary (Billboard)	17
US Hot Country Songs (Billboard)	35

== Cover Versions ==
- The song was recorded the same year by Slim Whitman, and was included on his album Home on the Range.
