= Georgia Keeps Pulling on My Ring =

Single by Conway Twitty

from the album Georgia Keeps Pulling on My Ring
- B-side: "Talkin' Bout You"
- Released: October 1977
- Genre: Country
- Length: 3:19
- Label: MCA
- Songwriter(s): Tim Marshall; David Wilkins
- Producer(s): Owen Bradley

Conway Twitty singles chronology
"I've Already Loved You in My Mind" (1977)	"Georgia Keeps Pulling on My Ring" (1977)	"The Grandest Lady of Them All" (1978)

"Georgia Keeps Pulling on My Ring" is a single co-written and originally recorded by Little David Wilkins. It was released in 1974, peaking at number 50 on the U.S. country singles charts.

It was later covered American country music artist Conway Twitty. It was released in October 1977 as the first single and title track from his album Georgia Keeps Pulling on My Ring. The song peaked at number 3 on the Billboard Hot Country Singles chart. It also reached number 1 on the RPM Country Tracks chart in Canada.

== Chart performance ==
=== Little David Wilkins ===
Chart (1974)	Peak position
US Hot Country Songs (Billboard)	50

=== Conway Twitty ===
Chart (1977)	Peak position
US Hot Country Songs (Billboard)	3
Canadian RPM Country Tracks	1
