= I'll Be Leaving Alone =

Single by Charley Pride

from the album She's Just an Old Love Turned Memory
- B-side: "We Need Lovin'"
- Released: May 1977
- Genre: Country
- Length: 2:51
- Label: RCA Victor
- Songwriters: Dickey Lee; Wayland Holyfield
- Producers: Jerry Bradley; Charley Pride

Charley Pride singles chronology
"She's Just an Old Love Turned Memory" (1977)	"I'll Be Leaving Alone" (1977)	"More to Me" (1977)

"I'll Be Leaving Alone" is a song written by Dickey Lee and Wayland Holyfield, and recorded by American country music artist Charley Pride. It was released in May 1977 as the third single from the album She's Just an Old Love Turned Memory. The song was Pride's eighteenth number one on the country chart. The single would stay at number one for one week and spent a total of twelve weeks on the country chart.

== Charts ==
=== Weekly charts ===
Chart (1977)	Peak position
US Hot Country Songs (Billboard)	1
Canadian RPM Country Tracks	1
Canadian RPM Top Singles	93

=== Year-end charts ===
Chart (1977)	Position
US Hot Country Songs (Billboard)	16
