= Play Guitar Play =

Single by Conway Twitty

from the album Play Guitar Play
- B-side: "One in a Million"
- Released: February 7, 1977
- Recorded: November 2, 1976
- Studio: Bradley's Barn, Mount Juliet, Tennessee
- Genre: Country
- Length: 3:22
- Label: MCA
- Songwriter(s): Conway Twitty
- Producer(s): Owen Bradley

Conway Twitty singles chronology
"I Can't Believe She Gives It All to Me" (1976)	"Play Guitar Play" (1977)	"I've Already Loved You in My Mind" (1977)

"Play Guitar Play" is a song written and recorded by American country music artist Conway Twitty. It was released in February 1977 as the second single and title track from the album Play Guitar Play. The song was Twitty's 19th number one on the country chart. "Play Guitar Play" stayed at number one for a single week and spent a total of 13 weeks on the country chart.

== Cover versions ==
The song was also recorded by Charley Pride and his version is on his 1978 album Someone Loves You Honey.

== Charts ==
=== Weekly charts ===
Chart (1977)	Peak position
US Hot Country Songs (Billboard)	1
Canadian RPM Country Tracks	1

=== Year-end charts ===
Chart (1977)	Position
US Hot Country Songs (Billboard)	13
