= I Can't Believe She Gives It All to Me =

Single by Conway Twitty

from the album Play Guitar Play
- B-side: "I Can't Help It If She Can't Stop Loving Me"
- Released: November 1976
- Recorded: January 4, 1974
- Studio: Bradley's Barn, Mount Juliet, Tennessee
- Genre: Country
- Length: 2:25
- Label: MCA
- Songwriter(s): Conway Twitty
- Producer(s): Owen Bradley

Conway Twitty singles chronology
"The Games That Daddies Play" (1976)	"I Can't Believe She Gives It All to Me" (1976)	"Play Guitar Play" (1977)

"I Can't Believe She Gives It All to Me" is a song written and recorded by American country music artist Conway Twitty. It was released in November 1976 as the first single from the album Play Guitar Play. The song was Twitty's 18th number one on the country chart. The single stayed at number one for a single week and spent a total of 12 weeks on the country chart.

== Charts ==
=== Weekly charts ===
Chart (1976–1977)	Peak position
US Hot Country Songs (Billboard)	1
Canadian RPM Country Tracks	1

=== Year-end charts ===
Chart (1977)	Position
US Hot Country Songs (Billboard)	28
