= You Never Miss a Real Good Thing (Till He Says Goodbye) =

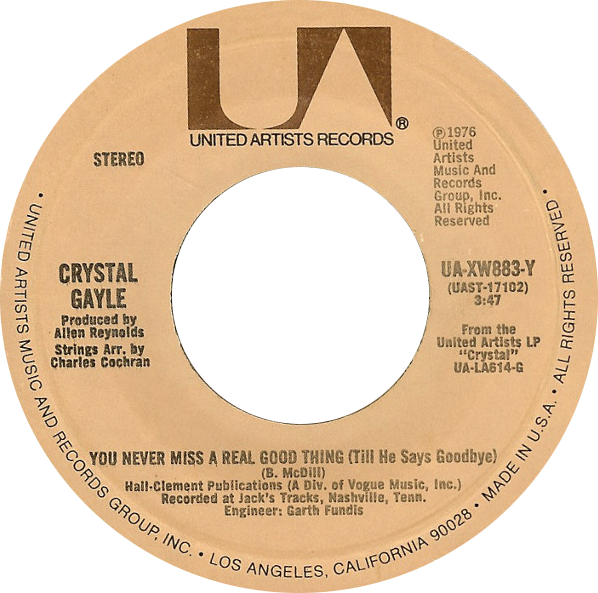
- Side A of the US single

Single by Crystal Gayle

from the album Crystal
- B-side: "Forgettin' 'bout You"
- Released: October 11, 1976
- Genre: Country
- Length: 3:47
- Label: United Artists
- Songwriter(s): Bob McDill
- Producer(s): Allen Reynolds

Crystal Gayle singles chronology
"One More Time (Karneval)" (1976)	"You Never Miss a Real Good Thing (Till He Says Goodbye)" (1976)	"I'll Do It All Over Again" (1977)

"You Never Miss a Real Good Thing (Till He Says Goodbye)" is a song written by Bob McDill, and recorded by American country music artist Crystal Gayle. It was released in October 1976 as the second single from her album Crystal. The song was her second #1 song on the country chart. It stayed at #1 for one week and spent 12 weeks on the country chart.

== Chart performance ==
Chart (1976–1977)	Peak position
US Hot Country Songs (Billboard)	1
Canadian RPM Country Tracks	1
