= Heaven's Just a Sin Away =

Single by The Kendalls

from the album Heaven's Just a Sin Away
- B-side: "Live and Let Live"
- Released: September 1977
- Genre: Country
- Length: 2:27
- Label: Ovation
- Songwriter: Jerry Gillespie
- Producer: Brien Fisher

The Kendalls singles chronology
"Making Believe" (1977)	"Heaven's Just a Sin Away" (1977)	"It Don't Feel Like Sinnin' to Me" (1978)

"Heaven's Just a Sin Away" is a song composed by Jerry Gillespie, which was recorded in 1977 by The Kendalls. Released in 1977, the song went to No. 1 on the Billboard Hot Country Singles (now Hot Country Songs) charts. It was the duo's first top-40 entry on that chart, and the second single from the album Heaven's Just a Sin Away, released on Ovation. It also reached No. 69 on the Billboard Hot 100.

The song won the Kendalls a Grammy Award for Best Country Performance by a Duo or Group with Vocal and Single of the Year win from the Country Music Association.

Kelly Willis recorded the song on her 1993 album Kelly Willis for MCA Nashville Records. Her version, the second and final single from that album, reached No. 63 on the country singles charts that year.

In 2009, former Creedence Clearwater Revival vocalist/guitarist John Fogerty recorded the song for his The Blue Ridge Rangers Rides Again album.

== Chart performance ==
=== The Kendalls ===
Chart (1977)	Peak position
U.S. Billboard Hot Country Singles	1
U.S. Billboard Hot 100	69
Canadian RPM Country Tracks	1
Canadian RPM Top Singles	59
Canadian RPM Adult Contemporary Tracks	37

=== Kelly Willis ===
Chart (1993)	Peak position
Canada Country Singles (RPM)	81
US Hot Country Songs (Billboard)	63
