= More to Me =

Single by Charley Pride

from the album Someone Loves You Honey
- B-side: "Heaven Watches Over Fools Like Me"
- Released: August 1977
- Genre: Country
- Length: 2:45
- Label: RCA Victor
- Songwriter: Ben Peters
- Producers: Jerry Bradley; Charley Pride

Charley Pride singles chronology
"I'll Be Leaving Alone" (1977)	"More to Me" (1977)	"Someone Loves You Honey" (1978)

"More to Me" is a song written by Ben Peters, and recorded by American country music artist Charley Pride. It was released in August 1977 as the first single from the album Someone Loves You Honey. The song was Pride's 19th number one on the U.S. country singles chart. The single stayed at number one for one week and spent a total of 11 weeks on the chart.

== Chart performance ==
Chart (1977)	Peak position
US Hot Country Songs (Billboard)	1
Canadian RPM Country Tracks	1
