= Let My Love Be Your Pillow =

Single by Ronnie Milsap

from the album Ronnie Milsap Live
- B-side: "Busy Makin' Plans"
- Released: November 27, 1976
- Genre: Country
- Length: 3:12
- Label: RCA
- Songwriter(s): John Schweers
- Producer(s): Tom Collins, Ronnie Milsap

Ronnie Milsap singles chronology
"(I'm A) Stand by My Woman Man" (1976)	"Let My Love Be Your Pillow" (1976)	"It Was Almost Like a Song" (1977)

"Let My Love Be Your Pillow" is a song written by John Schweers, and recorded by American country music artist Ronnie Milsap. It was released in November 1976 as the first single from the album Ronnie Milsap Live. The song was Milsap's seventh number one on the country chart. The single stayed at number one for one week and spent a total of twelve weeks on the chart.

== Charts ==
=== Weekly charts ===
Chart (1976–1977)	Peak position
US Hot Country Songs (Billboard)	1
Canadian RPM Country Tracks	1

=== Year-end charts ===
Chart (1977)	Position
US Hot Country Songs (Billboard)	27
