= Heart Healer =

Single by Mel Tillis

from the album Heart Healer
- B-side: "It's Just Not That Easy to Say"
- Released: December 1976
- Genre: Country
- Length: 2:29
- Label: MCA
- Songwriters: John Greenebaum; Tomas Gmeiner
- Producers: Mel Tillis, Jimmy Bowen

Mel Tillis singles chronology
"Good Woman Blues" (1976)	"Heart Healer" (1976)	"Burning Memories" (1977)

"Heart Healer" is a song written by John Greenebaum and Thomas Gmeiner, and recorded by American country music artist Mel Tillis. It was released in December 1976 as the first single and title track from the album Heart Healer. The song was Tillis' third number one on the country chart. The single stayed at number one for one week and spent a total of nine weeks on the country chart.

== Producer Companies ==
- Manufactured By – MCA Records, Inc.
- Produced For – Mel Tillis Productions, Inc.
- Phonographic Copyright (p) – MCA Records, Inc.
- Copyright (c) – MCA Records, Inc.

== Charts ==
=== Weekly charts ===
Chart (1976–1977)	Peak position
US Hot Country Songs (Billboard)	1
Canadian RPM Country Tracks	1

=== Year-end charts ===
Chart (1977)	Position
US Hot Country Songs (Billboard)	44
