= That Was Yesterday (Donna Fargo song) =

Single by Donna Fargo

from the album Fargo Country
- B-side: "The Cricket Song"
- Released: April 1977
- Recorded: March 1976
- Genre: Country
- Length: 3:19
- Label: Warner Bros. 8375
- Songwriter: Donna Fargo
- Producer: Stan Silver

Donna Fargo singles chronology
"Mockin' Bird Hill" (1977)	"That Was Yesterday" (1977)	"Shame On Me" (1977)

"That Was Yesterday" is a song written and recorded by American country music singer Donna Fargo. It was released in April 1977 as the first single from the album Fargo Country. The song became her sixth and final No. 1 song on the Billboard magazine Hot Country Singles chart.

== Background ==
When she first tried cutting "That Was Yesterday," Fargo was dissatisfied with the finished product - she had claimed the song sounded too much like Patsy Cline, and instead she (Fargo) was more of a writer/interpreter, she told Patsi Cox of Country Soung Roundup magazine. But since Warner Bros. Records had already committed to the track, she decided to take a copy of the session tape home and attempt to come up with a better product.

At first, she had written some prose, envisioning alternating between the existing vocal track and a speaking part. But nobody liked that either. Then, she decided to recite the lyrics from start to finish, with a chorus backing her. That version worked, and it was released as a single.

The finished product, styled in the country pop vein, takes the form of a letter the narrator is writing to a friend. She ponders why their friendship never advanced to a romance, despite her belief that it could, and should, have. But their chance is gone now, and at the end of the song, she decides not to mail the letter.

== Chart performance ==
"That Was Yesterday" reached No. 1 on July 2, 1977, knocking Waylon Jennings' "Luckenbach, Texas (Back to the Basics of Love)" out of the Hot Country Singles chart's top spot after six weeks. In doing so, the song earned two distinctions:

- It became just the second wall-to-wall recitation to reach No. 1 during the 1970s. To date, "That Was Yesterday" is the last all-spoken-word song to top the Billboard country chart.
- It became the first single on the Warner Bros. Records label to reach the No. 1 spot on the Billboard country chart.

=== Weekly charts ===
Chart (1977)	Peak position
US Hot Country Songs (Billboard)	1
Canadian RPM Country Tracks	1

=== Year-end charts ===
Chart (1977)	Position
US Hot Country Songs (Billboard)	15
