= She's Just an Old Love Turned Memory (song) =

Single by Charley Pride

from the album She's Just an Old Love Turned Memory
- B-side: "Country Music"
- Released: January 1977
- Genre: Country
- Length: 2:37
- Label: RCA Victor
- Songwriter: John Schweers
- Producers: Jerry Bradley; Charley Pride

Charley Pride singles chronology
"A Whole Lotta Things to Sing About" (1976)	"She's Just an Old Love Turned Memory" (1977)	"I'll Be Leaving Alone" (1977)

"She's Just an Old Love Turned Memory" is a song written by John Schweers, and recorded by American country music artist Charley Pride. It was released in January 1977 as the second single and title track from the album She's Just an Old Love Turned Memory. The song was his seventeenth number one on the country chart. The single stayed at number one for a single week and spent a total of ten weeks on country charts.

== Charts ==
=== Weekly charts ===
Chart (1977)	Peak position
US Hot Country Songs (Billboard)	1
Canadian RPM Country Tracks	1

=== Year-end charts ===
Chart (1977)	Position
US Hot Country Songs (Billboard)	41
