= Mel Tillis =

American country singer (1932–2017)

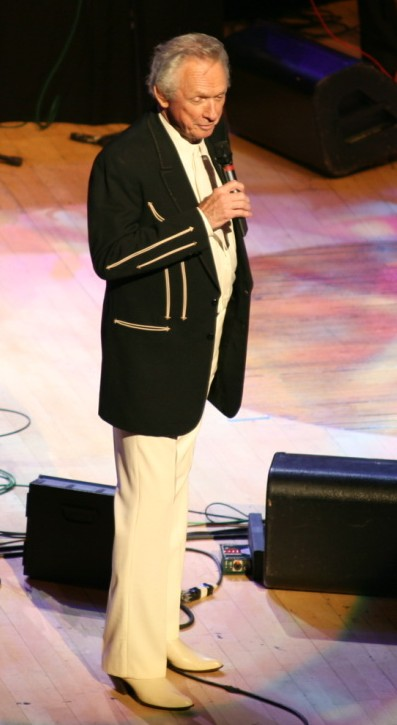
- Tillis at the Grand Ole Opry in 2007

Background information
- Born: Lonnie Melvin Tillis; August 8, 1932; Tampa, Florida, U.S.
- Died: November 19, 2017 (aged 85) Ocala, Florida, U.S.
- Genre: Country
- Occupation: Singer-songwriter
- Instruments: Vocals, guitar
- Years active: 1958–2017
- Labels: Columbia, Decca, Kapp, MGM, MCA, Elektra, Radio
- Formerly of: Old Dogs
- Website: meltillis.com

Lonnie Melvin Tillis (August 8, 1932 – November 19, 2017) was an American country music singer and songwriter. Although he recorded songs since the late 1950s, his biggest success occurred in the 1970s as part of the outlaw country movement, with a long list of Top 10 hits. Tillis' biggest hits include "I Ain't Never", "Good Woman Blues", and "Coca-Cola Cowboy". His composition "Ruby, Don't Take Your Love To Town" became a world-wide hit in 1969 when recorded by Kenny Rogers.

President Barack Obama awarded Tillis the National Medal of Arts in 2012 for his contributions to country music. He also won the Country Music Association Awards' most coveted award, Entertainer of the Year. Tillis was a member of the Grand Ole Opry, Nashville Songwriters Hall of Fame, and Country Music Hall of Fame. Additionally, he was known for his stutter, which did not affect his singing voice. His daughter is 1990s country hitmaker Pam Tillis.

== Early life ==
Mel Tillis was born in Tampa, Florida, US. His parents were Burma (née Rogers; 1907–1990) and Lonnie Lee Tillis (1907–1981). After a few months living in Tampa’s Lowry Park area, they moved to Plant City, Florida where he attended Wilson Elementary School. The family eventually moved to Pahokee, Florida, on the shores of Lake Okeechobee. After a bout of malaria during his childhood, he developed a stutter. As a child, Tillis learned the drums as well as guitar. At age 16, he won a local talent show.

He attended the University of Florida, but he dropped out and joined the United States Air Force. While stationed as a baker on Okinawa, he formed a band called The Westerners, which played at local nightclubs.

== Early music career ==
After leaving the Air Force in 1955, Tillis returned to Florida where he worked a number of odd jobs, eventually finding employment with the Atlantic Coast Line Railroad in Tampa. He used his railroad pass to visit Nashville and eventually met and auditioned for Wesley Rose of the publishing house Acuff-Rose Music. Rose encouraged Tillis to return to Florida and continue honing his songwriting skills. Tillis eventually moved to Tennessee, and began writing songs full-time. He wrote "I'm Tired", a No. 3 country hit for Webb Pierce in 1957. Other Tillis hits include "Honky Tonk Song" and "Tupelo County Jail". Ray Price, Kitty Wells and Brenda Lee also charted hits with Tillis' material around this time. In the late 1950s, after becoming a hit-making songwriter, he signed his own contract with Columbia Records. In 1958, he had his first Top 40 hit, "The Violet and a Rose", followed by the Top 25 hit "Sawmill".

== Rise to fame ==
Although Tillis charted his own hits on Billboard's Hot Country Songs list, he had more success as a songwriter, particularly for Webb Pierce. He wrote the hits "I Ain't Never" (Tillis' own future hit) and "Crazy, Wild Desire". Bobby Bare, Tom Jones ("Detroit City"), Wanda Jackson, and Stonewall Jackson also covered his songs. (Some well-known songs from his Columbia years include "The Brooklyn Bridge", "Loco Weed", and "Walk on, Boy".) In 1967 Jack Greene had a No. 1 hit with a song Tillis co-wrote, "All the Time". Tillis continued to record on his own, but did not achieve major success on the country charts at first.

In the mid-1960s, Tillis switched to Kapp Records, and in 1965, he had his first Top 15 hit with "Wine". Other hits continued to follow, such as "Stateside" and "Life Turned Her That Way", which was later covered by Ricky Van Shelton in 1988, going to No. 1. He wrote for Charley Pride ("The Snakes Crawl At Night") and wrote "Ruby, Don't Take Your Love to Town", which was a hit for Kenny Rogers and The First Edition. He also wrote the hit "Mental Revenge" for outlaw country star Waylon Jennings. It has also been covered by the Hacienda Brothers, Linda Ronstadt, Gram Parsons, Barbara Mandrell, and Jamey Johnson. In 1968, Tillis achieved his first Top 10 hit with "Who's Julie". He also was a regular featured singer on The Porter Wagoner Show.

== Height of his career ==
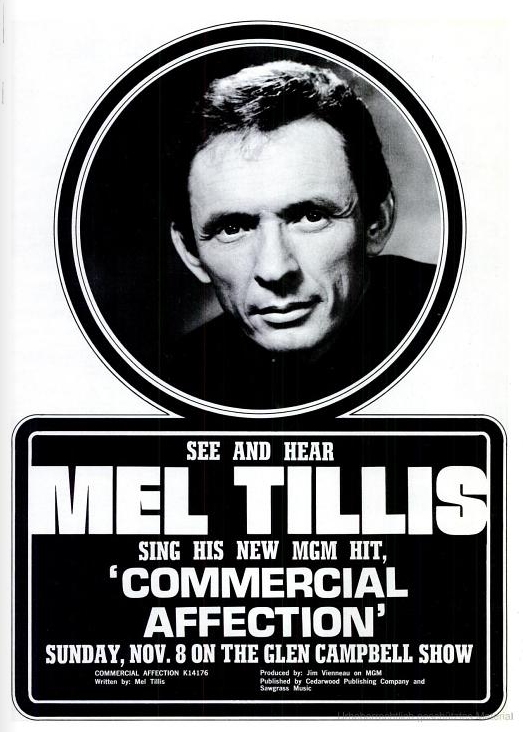
Mel Tillis (1970)

Things turned around in 1969 for Tillis. He finally achieved the success he always wanted with two Top 10 country hits, "These Lonely Hands of Mine" and "She'll Be Hanging Around Somewhere". In 1970, he reached the Top 5 with "Heart Over Mind", which peaked at No. 3 on the Hot Country Songs list. After this, Tillis' career as a country singer went into full swing. Hits soon came quite easily, such as "Heaven Everyday" (1970), "Commercial Affection" (1970), "Arms of a Fool" (1970), "Take My Hand" (a duet with Sherry Bryce in 1971), and "Brand New Mister Me" (1971). In 1972, Tillis achieved his first chart-topper with his version of his song "I Ain't Never". Even though the song was previously a hit by Webb Pierce, Tillis' version is the better-known version of the two. Most of the above-mentioned song hits were recorded on MGM Records, Tillis' record company in the early part of the decade.

After the success of "I Ain't Never", Tillis had another hit, which came close to No. 1 (reaching No. 3), titled "Neon Rose", followed by "Sawmill", which reached No. 2. "Midnight, Me and the Blues" was another near chart-topper in 1974. Other hits Tillis had on MGM include "Stomp Them Grapes" (1974), "Memory Maker" (1974), "Woman in the Back of My Mind" (1975), and his version of "Mental Revenge" (1976). Tillis achieved his biggest success with MCA Records, with which he signed in 1976. It started with a pair of two No. 1 hits in 1976, "Good Woman Blues" and "Heart Healer". In an interview, he mentioned having written five hits in one week. Thanks to this success, in 1976 Tillis won the Country Music Association Awards' most coveted award, Entertainer of the Year, and was also inducted into the Nashville Songwriters Hall of Fame that year. In 1977 he appeared on the game show Match Game. He achieved another No. 1 in 1978 with "I Believe In You" and then again in 1979 with "Coca-Cola Cowboy", which was put in the Clint Eastwood movie Every Which Way but Loose, in which he also made a cameo appearance. Also in 1978, Tillis co-hosted a short-lived variety series on ABC television, Mel and Susan Together, with model Susan Anton. Other hits around this time included "Send Me Down to Tucson", "Ain't No California", and "I Got the Hoss". In mid-1979, Tillis switched to another record company, Elektra Records.

After signing with Elektra, he continued to make hit songs such as "Blind In Love" and "Lying Time Again", both hits in 1979. Until 1981, Tillis remained on top of his game as one of country music's most successful vocalists of the era. "Your Body Is an Outlaw" went to No. 3 in 1980, followed by another Top 10 hit, "Steppin' Out". "Southern Rains" in 1981 was his last No. 1 hit. That same year, he released Mel and Nancy, an album of duets with Nancy Sinatra, which spawned two hit singles, the Top 30 hit "Texas Cowboy Night" and the double A-side, "Play Me or Trade Me/Where Would I Be". He remained with Elektra until 1982 before switching back to MCA for a brief period in 1983. That summer, he scored a Top 10 hit with "In The Middle Of The Night" and had his last Top 10 hit with "New Patches" in 1984. By this time, however, Tillis had built up a financial empire, thanks to investing in music publishing companies such as Sawgrass and Cedarwood.

== Movie roles ==
Tillis appeared in movies, including Cottonpickin' Chickenpickers (1967), W.W. and the Dixie Dancekings (1975), Every Which Way but Loose (1978), Smokey and the Bandit II (1980), The Cannonball Run (1981), The Cannonball Run II (1984), Beer for My Horses (2008), and comedy westerns The Villain (1979) and Uphill All the Way (1986), in which he starred with fellow country singer Roy Clark.

== Radio stations ==
In 1979, Tillis acquired radio station KIXZ (AM) in Amarillo, Texas, from Sammons-Ruff Associates, which converted from Top 40 to country music and became a force in the Texas Panhandle region (the station is now known today as a News/Talk radio station). A short time later, Tillis acquired Amarillo, Texas, Rock FM station KYTX, which changed calls to KMML (a play on Tillis' stutter) (that station is now known today as KXSS-FM, a Top 40 radio station and is currently still a sister station to KIXZ). Still later, he operated WMML in Mobile, Alabama. All of his stations were sold after a time for a healthy return.

== Later career and projects ==
Following his heyday in the 1970s, Tillis remained a songwriter in the 1980s, writing hits for Ricky Skaggs and Randy Travis. He also wrote his autobiography called Stutterin' Boy. Tillis appeared as the television commercial spokesman for the fast-food restaurant chain Whataburger during the 1980s. He briefly signed with RCA Records, as well as Mercury Records, and later Curb Records in 1991. His last top-10 hit was in 1984 and his last top-40 country hit in 1988; like most country artists of the classic era, his recording career was dented by changes in the country music industry in the early 1990s. He also built a theater in Branson, Missouri, where he performed on a regular basis until 2002. In 1998, he teamed with Bobby Bare, Waylon Jennings, and Jerry Reed to form The Old Dogs. The group recorded a double album of songs penned entirely by Shel Silverstein. In July 1998, Old Dogs Volumes 1 and 2 were released on the Atlantic Records label. A companion video, as well as a Greatest Hits album (composed of previously released material by each individual artist), were also available.

The Grand Ole Opry inducted Tillis on June 9, 2007. He was inducted into the Opry by his daughter Pam, and is the only person in the show's history to be welcomed into membership by their child. (In the 1990s, Pam became a very successful country music singer in her own right, with Top Ten hits like "Maybe It Was Memphis", "Shake the Sugar Tree" and the Number One "Mi Vida Loca (My Crazy Life)".) Along with being inducted into the Grand Ole Opry, it was announced on August 7 that year that Tillis, along with Ralph Emery and Vince Gill, were to be inducted into the Country Music Hall of Fame.

== Personal life and death ==
Tillis had six children, including singer-songwriter Pam Tillis. Pam recorded for Arista Nashville in the 1990s where she had multiple country hit singles such as "Mi Vida Loca (My Crazy Life)" and "Maybe It Was Memphis". His son Mel "Sonny" Tillis Jr. is also a songwriter. Sonny co-wrote Jamie O'Neal's 2001 hit single "When I Think About Angels".

Tillis suffered from several illnesses beginning in January 2016. On November 19, 2017, he died of respiratory failure in Ocala, Florida, at age 85. After this, Sonny Tillis began touring as a tribute act to his father.

== Discography ==
=== Solo studio albums ===
- Stateside (1966)
- Life's That Way (a.k.a. Life Turned Her That Way) (1967)
- Mr. Mel (1967)
- Let Me Talk to You (1968)
- Something Special (1968)
- Who's Julie (1969)
- Mel Tillis Sings "Old Faithful" (1969)
- She'll Be Hanging Round Somewhere (1970)
- One More Time (1970)
- The Arms of a Fool/Commercial Affection (1971)
- Would You Want the World to End (1972)
- I Ain't Never (1972)
- Sawmill (1973)
- Stomp Them Grapes (1974)
- Mel Tillis and the Statesiders (1975)
- M-M-Mel (1975)
- Welcome to Mel Tillis Country (1976)
- Love Revival (1976)
- Heart Healer (1977)
- Love's Troubled Waters (1977)
- I Believe in You (1978)
- Are You Sincere (1979)
- Mr. Entertainer (1979)
- Me and Pepper (1979)
- Your Body Is an Outlaw (1980)
- Southern Rain (1980)
- It's a Long Way to Daytona (1982)
- After All This Time (1983)
- New Patches (1984)
- California Road (1985)
- New Patches (1988)
- Big Balls in Cowtown (1988)
- Beyond the Sunset (1993)
- Wings of My Victory (2001)
- The Father's Son (2005)
- You Ain't Gonna Believe This (2010)

== The Statesiders ==
The Statesiders were Mel's longtime backing band. They were named after his 1966 hit single "Stateside". Between 1969 and 1980 14 studio albums and 4 live albums were released credited to Mel Tillis and the Statesiders, and the Statesiders released one studio album on their own in 1975. Several notable musicians have served as Statesiders, such as Buddy Cannon, Paul Franklin, Hoot Hester, and Jimmy Belken of the Strangers. While many other members have played with them during their run from 1967 to 2017, below is a timeline of just the members during their recorded output.

== Bibliography ==
- Tillis, Mel; Wager, Walter (1984). Stutterin' Boy: The Autobiography of Mel Tillis. Rawson Assoc. ISBN 978-0892562633.
