= List of RPM number-one country singles of 1971 =

These are the Canadian number-one country songs of 1971, per the RPM Country Tracks chart.

Issue date	Title	Artist
January 9	Old Bill Jones	Mercey Brothers
January 16	(I Never Promised You a) Rose Garden	Lynn Anderson
January 23	Flesh and Blood	Johnny Cash
January 30	Flesh and Blood	Johnny Cash
February 6	Flesh and Blood	Johnny Cash
February 13	Flesh and Blood	Johnny Cash
February 20	(I Never Promised You a) Rose Garden	Lynn Anderson
February 27	Sing High, Sing Low	Anne Murray
March 6	A Woman Always Knows	David Houston
March 13	Help Me Make It Through the Night	Sammi Smith
March 20	A Stranger in My Place	Anne Murray
March 27	A Stranger in My Place	Anne Murray
April 3	I'd Rather Love You	Charley Pride
April 10	Anyway	George Hamilton IV
April 17	Empty Arms	Sonny James
April 24	Man from the City	Humphrey and the Dumptrucks
May 1	We Sure Can Love Each Other	Tammy Wynette
May 8	We Sure Can Love Each Other	Tammy Wynette
May 15	How Much More Can She Stand	Conway Twitty
May 22	I Won't Mention It Again	Ray Price
May 29	I Won't Mention It Again	Ray Price
June 5	The Final Hour	Hank Smith
June 12	I Wanna Be Free	Loretta Lynn
June 19	Hello Mom	Mercey Brothers
June 26	Hello Mom	Mercey Brothers
July 3	You're My Man	Lynn Anderson
July 10	When You're Hot, You're Hot	Jerry Reed
July 17	Rise 'n' Shine	Dick Damron
July 24	Countryfied	George Hamilton IV
July 31	Countryfied	George Hamilton IV
August 7	Countryfied	George Hamilton IV
August 14	Countryfied	George Hamilton IV
August 21	Countryfied	George Hamilton IV
August 28	Sweet City Woman	The Stampeders
September 4	Sweet City Woman	The Stampeders
September 11	I'm Just Me	Charley Pride
September 18	Good Lovin' (Makes It Right)	Tammy Wynette
September 25	When He Walks on You	Jerry Lee Lewis
October 2	Easy Loving	Freddie Hart
October 9	Who Wrote the Words	Mercey Brothers
October 16	Who Wrote the Words	Mercey Brothers
October 23	Talk It Over in the Morning	Anne Murray
October 30	You're Lookin' at Country	Loretta Lynn
November 6	How Can I Unlove You	Lynn Anderson
November 13	Rollin' in My Sweet Baby's Arms	Buck Owens
November 20	Rollin' in My Sweet Baby's Arms	Buck Owens
November 27	Where Do We Go from Here	Hank Smith
December 4	I Say a Little Prayer/By the Time I Get to Phoenix	Anne Murray and Glen Campbell
December 11	Lead Me On	Conway Twitty and Loretta Lynn
December 18	Kiss an Angel Good Mornin'	Charley Pride
December 25	Kiss an Angel Good Mornin'	Charley Pride

== See also ==
- 1971 in music
- List of number-one country singles of 1971 (U.S.)
