= 1971 in country music =

This is a list of notable events in country music that took place in the year 1971.

== Events ==
=== No dates ===
- Seeking younger, more urban viewers, CBS cancels nearly all of its rural-themed programming. Among the most notable casualties:
  - The Beverly Hillbillies – a sitcom which had aired since 1962, about the misadventures of an Appalachia clan who become oil tycoons.
  - Green Acres – another sitcom about a New York attorney and his wife who move to the country and start farming.
  - Hee Haw – the country music-variety show starring Roy Clark and Buck Owens.

Fans of Hee Haw were quickly soothed when the show entered syndication in the fall. The show was an immediate success, and viewers would continue to make their weekly visit to Kornfield County for the next 20 years. Meanwhile, both The Beverly Hillbillies and Green Acres would continue to live on in syndication. ABC, also hoping to draw in younger viewers, canceled, among other shows, The Johnny Cash Show. Although not country-music oriented, The Lawrence Welk Show, which had among its older-leaning demographics country music fans, is also canceled, but like Hee Haw will be revived in the fall in syndication to great success.

- Up-and-coming country music star Mickey Gilley and business partner Sherwood Cryer open Gilley's, a bar/honky tonk that was featured in the 1980 movie Urban Cowboy, and became famous for featuring up-and-coming country acts and its mechanical bulls.

== Top hits of the year ==
=== Number one hits ===
==== United States ====
(as certified by Billboard)

Date	Single Name	Artist	Wks. No.1	CAN peak	Spec. Note
January 30	Flesh and Blood	Johnny Cash	1
February 6	Joshua	Dolly Parton	1	2	^{[A]}
February 13	Help Me Make It Through the Night	Sammi Smith	3		^{[C]}
March 6	I'd Rather Love You	Charley Pride	3
March 27	After the Fire Is Gone	Conway Twitty and Loretta Lynn	2	4
April 10	Empty Arms	Sonny James	4
May 8	How Much More Can She Stand	Conway Twitty	1
May 15	I Won't Mention It Again	Ray Price	3
June 5	You're My Man	Lynn Anderson	2
June 19	When You're Hot, You're Hot	Jerry Reed	5		^{[A]}
July 24	Bright Lights, Big City	Sonny James	1	4
July 31	I'm Just Me	Charley Pride	4
August 28	Good Lovin' (Makes It Right)	Tammy Wynette	2
September 11	Easy Loving	Freddie Hart	3		^{[1], [2], [A]}: Returned to Number One on October 2.
September 18	The Year Clayton Delaney Died	Tom T. Hall	2	6
October 16	How Can I Unlove You	Lynn Anderson	3
November 6	Here Comes Honey Again	Sonny James	1	4
November 13	Lead Me On	Conway Twitty and Loretta Lynn	1
November 20	Daddy Frank (The Guitar Man)	Merle Haggard	2	2
December 4	Kiss an Angel Good Mornin'	Charley Pride	5

Notes

- 1 No. 1 song of the year, as determined by Billboard.
- 2 Song dropped from No. 1 and later returned to top spot.
- A First Billboard No. 1 hit for that artist.
- C Only Billboard No. 1 hit for that artist to date.

==== Canada ====
(as certified by RPM)

Date	Single Name	Artist	Wks. No.1	U.S. peak	Spec. Note
January 9	Old Bill Jones	Mercey Brothers	1	—
January 16	(I Never Promised You a) Rose Garden	Lynn Anderson	2		^{[2]}: Fell to #6 on the week of January 23.
January 23	Flesh and Blood	Johnny Cash	4
February 27	Sing High, Sing Low	Anne Murray	1	53
March 6	A Woman Always Knows	David Houston	1	2	^{[B]}
March 13	Help Me Make It Through the Night	Sammi Smith	1		^{[C]}
March 20	A Stranger in My Place	Anne Murray	2	27
April 3	I'd Rather Love You	Charley Pride	1
April 10	Anyway	George Hamilton IV	1	13
April 17	Empty Arms	Sonny James	1
April 24	Man from the City	Humphrey and the Dumptrucks	1	—	^{[C]}
May 1	We Sure Can Love Each Other	Tammy Wynette	2	2
May 15	How Much More Can She Stand	Conway Twitty	1
May 22	I Won't Mention It Again	Ray Price	2		^{[B]}
June 5	The Final Hour	Hank Smith	1	—
June 12	I Wanna Be Free	Loretta Lynn	1	3
June 19	Hello Mom	Mercey Brothers	2	—
July 3	You're My Man	Lynn Anderson	1
July 10	When You're Hot, You're Hot	Jerry Reed	1		^{[A]}
July 17	Rise 'n' Shine	Dick Damron	1	—
July 24	Countryfied	George Hamilton IV	5	35
August 28	Sweet City Woman	The Stampeders	2	—	^{[C]}
September 11	I'm Just Me	Charley Pride	1
September 18	Good Lovin' (Makes It Right)	Tammy Wynette	1
September 25	When He Walks on You	Jerry Lee Lewis	1	11
October 2	Easy Loving	Freddie Hart	1		^{[A]}
October 9	Who Wrote the Words	Mercey Brothers	2	—	^{[B]}
October 23	Talk It Over in the Morning	Anne Murray	1	—
October 30	You're Lookin' at Country	Loretta Lynn	1	5
November 6	How Can I Unlove You	Lynn Anderson	1
November 13	Rollin' in My Sweet Baby's Arms	Buck Owens	2	2
November 27	Where Do We Go from Here	Hank Smith	1	—
December 4	I Say a Little Prayer/ By the Time I Get to Phoenix	Anne Murray and Glen Campbell	1	40
December 11	Lead Me On	Conway Twitty and Loretta Lynn	1
December 18	Kiss an Angel Good Mornin'	Charley Pride	2

Notes

- 2 Song dropped from No. 1 and later returned to top spot.
- A First RPM No. 1 hit for that artist.
- B Last RPM No. 1 hit for that artist.
- C Only RPM No. 1 hit for that artist.

=== Other major hits ===
==== Singles released by American artists ====
US	CAN	Single	Artist
18	21	After All They Used to Belong to Me	Hank Williams, Jr.
18	—	All I Ever Need Is You	Ray Sanders
6	5	Always Remember	Bill Anderson
13	12	Angel's Sunday	Jim Ed Brown
5	13	Another Night of Love	Freddy Weller
4	13	The Arms of a Fool	Mel Tillis
5	8	Baby I'm Yours	Jody Miller
30	7	Bar Room Talk	Del Reeves
11	20	Be a Little Quieter	Porter Wagoner
9	3	Bed of Rose's	The Statler Brothers
7	8	Better Move It on Home	Porter Wagoner and Dolly Parton
41	18	Big River (Johnny Cash song)	Johnny Cash
8	46	Brand New Mister Me	Mel Tillis
9	8	Bridge over Troubled Water	Buck Owens
26	19	Catch the Wind	Jack Barlow
12	11	Cedartown, Georgia	Waylon Jennings
7	6	The Chair	Marty Robbins
15	10	Charley's Picture	Porter Wagoner
23	7	Chip 'N' Dale's Place	Claude King
4	15	Coat of Many Colors	Dolly Parton
7	6	Come Sundown	Bobby Bare
8	17	Comin' Down	Dave Dudley
5	7	Country Green	Don Gibson
23	20	Day Drinkin'	Dave Dudley and Tom T. Hall
4	11	Dis-Satisfied	Bill Anderson and Jan Howard
17	—	Do Right Woman, Do Right Man	Barbara Mandrell
16	30	(Don't Let the Sun Set on You) Tulsa	Waylon Jennings
7	4	Dream Baby (How Long Must I Dream)	Glen Campbell
5	—	Dream Lover	Billy "Crash" Craddock
9	12	Early Morning Sunshine	Marty Robbins
13	26	Fancy Satin Pillows	Wanda Jackson
8	5	Fly Away Again	Dave Dudley
7	22	Good Enough to Be Your Wife	Jeannie C. Riley
27	12	A Good Man	June Carter Cash
2	4	Good Year for the Roses	George Jones
19	4	Guess Away the Blues	Don Gibson
7	5	Guess Who	Slim Whitman
5	2	Gwen (Congratulations)	Tommy Overstreet
16	14	Gypsy Feet	Jim Reeves
26	19	Hanging Over Me	Jack Greene
5	3	He's So Fine	Jody Miller
13	21	Here I Go Again	Bobby Wright
12	—	Hitchin' a Ride	Jack Reno
5	3	I Don't Know You (Anymore)	Tommy Overstreet
15	25	I Love the Way That You've Been Lovin' Me	Roy Drusky
4	3	I Wonder What She'll Think About Me Leaving	Conway Twitty
2	2	I'd Rather Be Sorry	Ray Price
13	—	I'll Follow You (Up to Our Cloud)	George Jones
17	34	I'm Gonna Act Right	Nat Stuckey
3	26	I'm Gonna Keep on Keep on Lovin' You	Billy Walker
6	17	I've Got a Right to Cry	Hank Williams, Jr.
19	29	If You Think I Love You Now (I've Just Started)	Jody Miller
3	4	Indian Lake	Freddy Weller
20	37	It Wasn't God Who Made Honky Tonk Angels	Lynn Anderson
2	2	Just One Time	Connie Smith
3	21	Knock Three Times	Billy "Crash" Craddock
11	3	Ko-Ko Joe	Jerry Reed
9	26	L.A. International Airport	Susan Raye
18	13	The Last One to Touch Me	Porter Wagoner
9	11	Leavin' and Sayin' Goodbye	Faron Young
15	5	Listen Betty (I'm Singing Your Song)	Dave Dudley
9	16	Living and Learning	Mel Tillis and Sherry Bryce
12	33	Lovenworth	Roy Rogers
28	8	Loving Her Was Easier (Than Anything I'll Ever Do Again)	Roger Miller
10	19	Maiden's Prayer	David Houston
3	2	Man in Black	Johnny Cash
18	18	The Mark of a Heel	Hank Thompson
17	13	Mary's Vineyard	Claude King
7	3	Me and You and a Dog Named Boo	Stonewall Jackson
14	6	Mississippi Woman	Waylon Jennings
19	39	The Morning After	Jerry Wallace
20	—	Mountain of Love	Bobby G. Rice
17	4	My Blue Tears	Dolly Parton
9	24	Nashville	David Houston
8	31	Never Ending Song of Love	Dickey Lee
19	34	New York City	The Statler Brothers
15	36	Next Time I Fall in Love (I Won't)	Hank Thompson
15	7	No Need to Worry	Johnny Cash and June Carter Cash
23	3	North Country/West Texas Highway	George Hamilton IV
21	18	Ode to Half a Pound of Ground Round	Tom T. Hall
4	5	Oh Singer	Jeannie C. Riley
14	11	One Hundred Children	Tom T. Hall
5	3	Padre	Marty Robbins
16	17	Papa Was a Good Man	Johnny Cash
9	38	The Philadelphia Fillies	Del Reeves
13	27	Pictures	The Statler Brothers
6	9	Pitty Pitty Patter	Susan Raye
8	3	Please Don't Tell Me How the Story Ends	Bobby Bare
49	19	Pledging My Love	Kitty Wells
26	9	Portrait of My Woman	Eddy Arnold
3	9	The Promised Land	Freddy Weller
3	2	Quits	Bill Anderson
3	2	Rainin' in My Heart	Hank Williams Jr. and The Mike Curb Congregation
14	26	The Right Combination	Porter Wagoner and Dolly Parton
7	10	Right Won't Touch a Hand	George Jones
7	21	Rings	Tompall & the Glaser Brothers
15	15	Roses and Thorns	Jeannie C. Riley
3	3	Ruby (Are You Mad)	Buck Owens
24	13	Saturday Morning Confusion	Bobby Russell
19	9	She Don't Make Me Cry	David Rogers
11	5	She Wakes Me with a Kiss Every Morning (And She Loves Me to Sleep Every Night)	Nat Stuckey
2	2	She's All I Got	Johnny Paycheck
8	9	The Sheriff of Boone County	Kenny Price
18	—	Singing in Viet Nam Talking Blues	Johnny Cash
20	28	So This Is Love	Tommy Cash
3	4	Soldier's Last Letter	Merle Haggard
2	2	Someday We'll Look Back	Merle Haggard
6	23	Something Beautiful (To Remember)	Slim Whitman
10	7	Sometimes You Just Can't Win	George Jones
6	11	Step Aside	Faron Young
14	23	Sweet Misery	Ferlin Husky
50	17	Take Me Home, Country Roads	John Denver
8	15	Take My Hand	Mel Tillis and Sherry Bryce
10	16	Then You Walk In	Sammi Smith
9	—	There Goes My Everything	Elvis Presley
13	15	There's a Whole Lot About a Woman (A Man Don't Know)	Jack Greene
19	—	There's Something About a Lady	Johnny Duncan
11	13	Tomorrow Night in Baltimore	Roger Miller
3	4	Touching Home	Jerry Lee Lewis
12	—	Treat Him Right	Barbara Mandrell
11	18	Waiting for a Train (All Around the Watertank)	Jerry Lee Lewis
7	7	Watching Scotty Grow	Bobby Goldsboro
20	—	We've Got Everything but Love	David Houston and Barbara Mandrell
11	20	Where Is My Castle	Connie Smith
10	9	Willy Jones	Susan Raye
5	2	The Wonders You Perform	Tammy Wynette
10	—	You Better Move On	Billy "Crash" Craddock
38	17	You're Just More a Woman	Bob Yarbrough

==== Singles released by Canadian artists ====
US	CAN	Single	Artist
—	2	24 Hours from Tulsa	Tommy Graham
—	2	The Bridge Came Tumbling Down	Stompin' Tom Connors
—	11	Carry Me	The Stampeders
—	4	Federal Grain Train	Russ Gurr
—	3	Good Morning World	Julie Lynn
—	8	Goofie Newfie	Roy Payne
—	11	It Seems	Jim Roberts
—	2	It Takes Time	Gary Buck
—	6	It Takes Time	Anne Murray
—	12	Kelly	Alan Moberg
—	15	Love Now and Pay Later	Carroll Baker
—	2	Luke's Guitar	Stompin' Tom Connors
—	14	Mem'ries of Home	Carroll Baker
—	17	The Moods of My Man	Honey West
14	12	The Morning After Baby Let Me Down	Ray Griff
—	10	Nobody's Singing Them Cowboy Songs No More	Gordie Tapp
—	18	Parliament Hill	Angus Walker
—	2	R.R. #2	Family Brown
—	15	Sault Ste. Marie	Original Caste
—	14	Six Days of Paper Ladies	Humphrey and the Dumptrucks
—	7	Skip a Rope	Mike Graham
—	12	Tillsonburg	Stompin' Tom Connors
—	16	(The Whole World's) Down on You	Jack Bailey
—	13	Wrote a Song	The Rainvilles

== Top new album releases ==
Album	Artist	Record Label
Always Remember	Bill Anderson	Decca
Bed of Rose's	Statler Brothers	Mercury
Bill Anderson's Greatest Hits, Vol. 2	Bill Anderson	Decca
Cedartown, Georgia	Waylon Jennings	RCA
Coat of Many Colors	Dolly Parton	RCA
Greatest Hits, Vol. 2	Johnny Cash	Columbia
He's So Fine	Jody Miller	Epic
How Can I Unlove You	Lynn Anderson	Columbia
I Wanna Be Free	Loretta Lynn	Decca
I've Gotta Sing	Wanda Jackson	Capitol
In Search of a Song	Tom T. Hall	Mercury
Joshua	Dolly Parton	RCA
Man in Black	Johnny Cash	Columbia
Pitty Pitty Patter	Susan Raye	Capitol
Porter Wayne and Dolly Rebecca	Porter Wagoner and Dolly Parton	RCA
The Silver Tongued Devil and I	Kris Kristofferson	Monument
Treat Him Right	Barbara Mandrell	Columbia
A Tribute to the Best Damn Fiddle Player in the World (or, My Salute to Bob Wills)	Merle Haggard	Capitol
Two of a Kind	Porter Wagoner and Dolly Parton	RCA
We Only Make Believe	Conway Twitty and Loretta Lynn	Decca
When You're Hot, You're Hot	Jerry Reed	RCA
Yesterday's Wine	Willie Nelson	RCA
You're My Man	Lynn Anderson	Columbia

== Births ==
- January 17 – Kid Rock (born Robert Ritchie), white rap vocalist who had major country hits with "Picture" (duet with Sheryl Crow) and "All Summer Long."
- February 5 — Sara Evans, female vocalist from the late 1990s–2000s (decade).
- March 4 – Jason Sellers, singer-songwriter.
- March 10 – Daryle Singletary, neotraditonialist singer of the 1990s (died 2018).
- April 26 — Jay DeMarcus, member of Rascal Flatts.
- May 16 — Rick Trevino, Mexican-American singer who had several hits in the 1990s.
- April 30 — Carolyn Dawn Johnson, singer-songwriter.
- July 23 — Alison Krauss, bluegrass artist, vocalist and leader of Union Station.
- October 20 – Jimi Westbrook, member of Little Big Town.

== Deaths ==
- February 7 — Dock Boggs, 73, influential old-time country singer.
- February 28 – Fiddlin' Arthur Smith, 72, old-time fiddle player.
- June 12 — J. E. Mainer, 72, old-time fiddle player and early country music star.
- August 7 – Henry D. "Homer" Haynes, 50, of the Homer and Jethro comedy duo.
- August 20 — Tom Darby, 79, one half of the duo Darby and Tarlton, an early country music duo.

== Country Music Hall of Fame Inductees ==
Arthur Edward Satherley (1889–1986)

== Major awards ==
=== Grammy Awards ===
- Best Female Country Vocal Performance — "Help Me Make It Through the Night", Sammi Smith
- Best Male Country Vocal Performance — "When You're Hot, You're Hot", Jerry Reed
- Best Country Performance by a Duo or Group with Vocal — "After the Fire Is Gone", Loretta Lynn and Conway Twitty
- Best Country Instrumental Performance — "Snowbird" Chet Atkins
- Best Country Song — "Help Me Make It Through the Night", Kris Kristofferson (Performer: Sammi Smith)

=== Juno Awards ===
- Country Male Vocalist of the Year — Stompin' Tom Connors
- Country Female Vocalist of the Year — Myrna Lorrie
- Country Group or Duo of the Year — Mercey Brothers

=== Academy of Country Music ===
- Entertainer of the Year — Freddie Hart
- Song of the Year — "Easy Loving", Freddie Hart (Performer: Freddie Hart)
- Single of the Year — "Easy Loving", Freddie Hart
- Album of the Year — Easy Loving, Freddie Hart
- Top Male Vocalist — Freddie Hart
- Top Female Vocalist — Loretta Lynn
- Top Vocal Duo — Conway Twitty and Loretta Lynn
- Top New Male Vocalist — Tony Booth
- Top New Female Vocalist — Barbara Mandrell

=== Country Music Association ===
- Entertainer of the Year — Charley Pride
- Song of the Year — "Easy Loving", Freddie Hart (Performer: Freddie Hart)
- Single of the Year — "Help Me Make It Through the Night", Sammi Smith
- Album of the Year — I Won't Mention It Again, Ray Price
- Male Vocalist of the Year — Charley Pride
- Female Vocalist of the Year — Lynn Anderson
- Vocal Duo of the Year — Porter Wagoner and Dolly Parton
- Vocal Group of the Year — Osborne Brothers
- Instrumentalist of the Year — Jerry Reed
- Instrumental Group of the Year — Danny Davis and the Nashville Brass

== Other links ==
- Country Music Association
- Inductees of the Country Music Hall of Fame
