= Charley Pride singles discography =

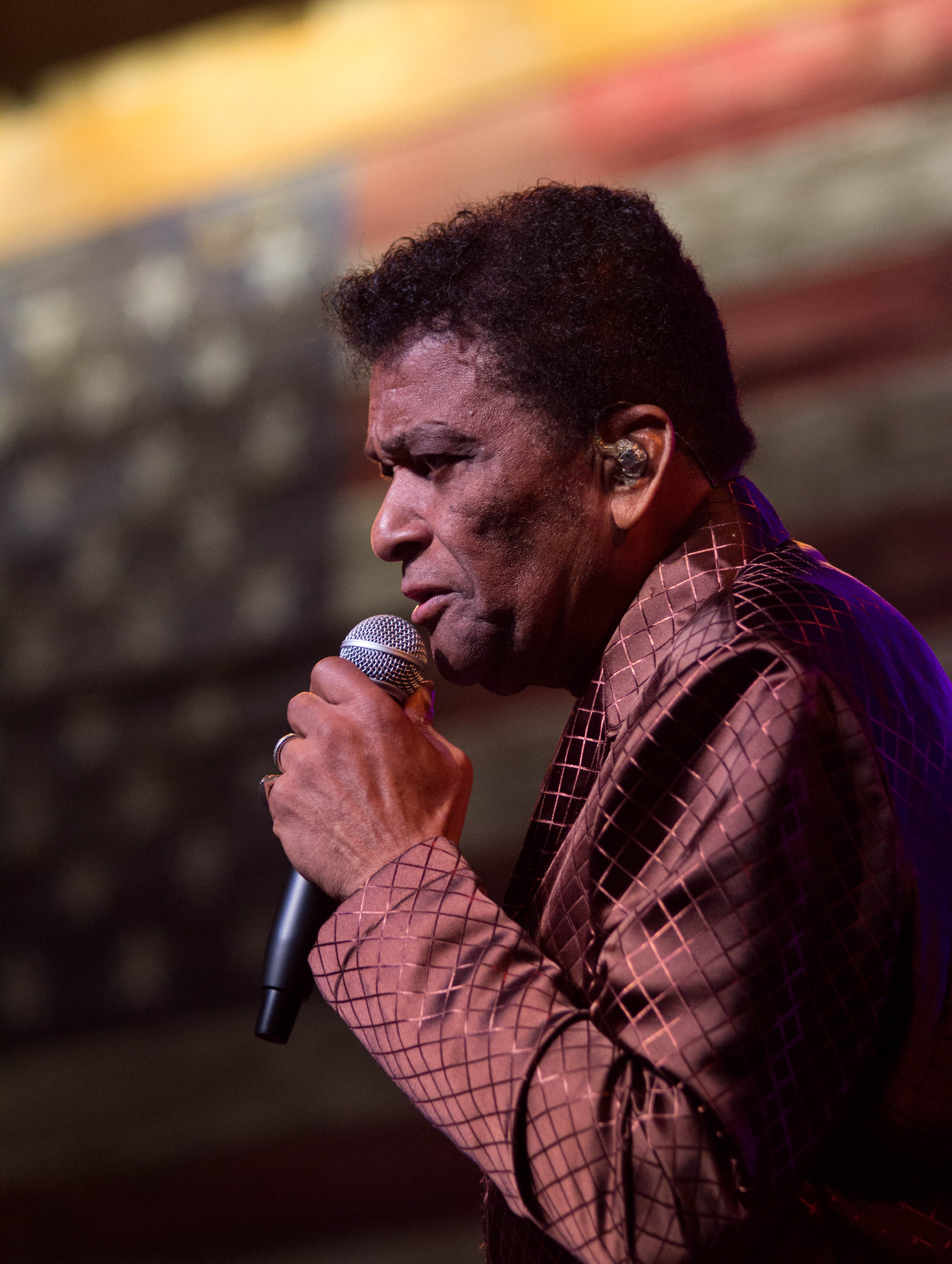
- Charley Pride, 2016
- Singles: 75
- Music videos: 11
- Promotional singles: 2
- Guest singles: 1
- Other charted songs: 1

The discography of American country music artist Charley Pride contains 75 singles, one other charting song, two promotional singles, one featured single and 11 music videos. Pride signed his first recording contract with RCA Victor in 1966. His first two singles failed to become hits. His third single, "Just Between You and Me," became a hit when it reached the top ten of the country charts. Pride had several more top ten hits over the next several years until he had first chart-topper in 1969. The single, "All I Have to Offer You (Is Me)," reached number one on the Billboard Hot Country Songs chart and spent 17 weeks charting. This was followed by five more number one hits, including "Is Anybody Goin' to San Antone." All of these singles also reached low-end positions on the Billboard Hot 100.

In 1971, "Kiss an Angel Good Mornin'" not only topped the country chart, but also climbed to number 21 on the Hot 100 and number seven on the adult contemporary chart. Pride had further success with more number one country hits: "It's Gonna Take a Little Bit Longer," "She's Too Good to Be True," "A Shoulder to Cry On," "Then Who Am I," "Don't Fight the Feelings of Love," "Amazing Love," "Then Who Am I" and "Hope You're Feelin' Me (Like I'm Feelin' You)." He shifted his musical approach towards a more country pop style in the second half of the 70s and continued having number one hits. In total, Pride had seven more singles that topped the Billboard country songs chart between 1976 and 1979. This included "Someone Loves You Honey" and "You're My Jamaica."

Pride remained with RCA Records into the early 1980s and had more hits with new songs and covers of former hits. Examples included "Honky Tonk Blues," "Mountain of Love" and "Night Games." Pride's chart success declined beginning in 1984 and then left RCA in 1986 for the smaller 16th Avenue label. In 1988, he had a number five country hit with "Shouldn't It Be Easier Than This." His 1990 single, "Amy's Eyes," would be his final charting single, peaking at number 28 on the country chart. Pride continued releasing singles sporadically until his death in 2020.

== Singles ==
=== 1960s ===
List of singles, with selected chart positions, and other relevant details
Title	Year	Peak chart positions					Album
Title	Year	US	US Cou.	AUS	CAN	CAN Cou.	Album
"The Snakes Crawl at Night"	1966	—	—	—	—	—	Country Charley Pride
"Before I Met You"	1966	—	—	—	—	—	Country Charley Pride
"Just Between You and Me"	1966	—	9	—	—	—	Pride of Country Music
"I Know One"	1967	—	6	—	—	—	Pride of Country Music
"Does My Ring Hurt Your Finger"	1967	—	4	—	—	3	The Country Way
"The Day the World Stood Still"	1967	—	4	—	—	5	The Country Way
"The Easy Part's Over"	1968	—	2	—	—	2	Songs of Pride...Charley That Is
"Let the Chips Fall"	1968	—	4	—	—	3	The Sensational Charley Pride
"Kaw-Liga"	1969	— (Note: "Kaw-Liga" peaked at number 20 on the Billboard Bubbling Under Hot 100 singles chart, a list which acts as a 25-song extension of the Hot 100.)	3	—	—	1	Charley Pride in Person
"All I Have to Offer You (Is Me)"	1969	91	1	—	82	3	The Best of Charley Pride
"(I'm So) Afraid of Losing You Again"	1969	74	1	—	—	1	Just Plain Charley
"Wings of a Dove"	1969	—	—	95	—	—	Make Mine Country
"—" denotes a recording that did not chart or was not released in that territory.

=== 1970s ===
List of singles, with selected chart positions, and other relevant details
Title	Year	Peak chart positions								Certifications	Album
Title	Year	US	US Cou.	US AC	AUS	CAN	CAN Cou.	CAN AC	NZ	Certifications	Album
"Is Anybody Goin' to San Antone"	1970	70	1	—	56	—	1	—	—		Charley Pride's 10th Album
"Wonder Could I Live There Anymore"	1970	87	1	—	88	—	1	—	—		From Me to You
"I Can't Believe That You've Stopped Loving Me"	1970	71	1	—	—	—	1	—	—		From Me to You
"Christmas in My Home Town"	1970	—	—	—	—	—	—	—	—		Christmas in My Home Town
"I'd Rather Love You"	1971	79	1	—	—	—	1	—	—		I'm Just Me
"Did You Think to Pray"	1971	—	70	—	—	—	—	—	—		Did You Think to Pray
"Me and Bobby McGee"	1971	—	—	—	36	—	—	—	—		Just Plain Charley
"I'm Just Me"	1971	94	1	—	—	—	1	—	—		I'm Just Me
"Kiss an Angel Good Mornin'"	1971	21	1	7	58	31	1	2	—	RIAA: Gold	Charley Pride Sings Heart Songs
"All His Children" (with Henry Mancini)	1972	92	2	—	51	—	1	—	—		Country Feelin'
"It's Gonna Take a Little Bit Longer"	1972	— (Note: "It's Gonna Take a Little Bit Longer" peaked at number two on the Billboard Bubbling Under Hot 100 singles chart, a list which acts as a 25-song extension of the Hot 100.)	1	—	—	—	1	—	—		A Sunshiny Day with Charley Pride
"She's Too Good to Be True"	1972	—	1	—	—	—	1	—	—		Songs of Love by Charley Pride
"A Shoulder to Cry On"	1973	— (Note: "A Shoulder to Cry On" peaked at number one on the Billboard Bubbling Under Hot 100 singles chart, a list which acts as a 25-song extension of the Hot 100.)	1	—	—	—	1	—	—		Sweet Country
"Don't Fight the Feelings of Love"	1973	— (Note: "Don't Fight the Feelings of Love" peaked at number one on the Billboard Bubbling Under Hot 100 singles chart, a list which acts as a 25-song extension of the Hot 100.)	1	—	100	—	1	—	—		Sweet Country
"Amazing Love"	1973	—	1	—	—	—	1	—	—		Amazing Love
"We Could"	1974	—	3	—	—	—	1	—	—		Country Feelin'
"Mississippi Cotton Picking Delta Town"	1974	70	3	—	—	—	1	—	—		Pride of America
"Then Who Am I"	1974	—	1	—	—	—	1	—	—		Pride of America
"I Ain't All Bad"	1975	— (Note: "I Ain't All Bad" peaked at number one on the Billboard Bubbling Under Hot 100 singles chart, a list which acts as a 25-song extension of the Hot 100.)	6	—	—	—	1	—	—		Charley
"Hope You're Feelin' Me (Like I'm Feelin' You)"	1975	—	1	—	—	—	2	—	—		Charley
"The Happiness of Having You"	1975	—	3	—	—	—	1	—	—		The Happiness of Having You
"My Eyes Can Only See as Far as You"	1976	—	1	—	—	—	1	—	—		The Happiness of Having You
"I Don't Deserve a Mansion"	1976	—	—	—	—	—	—	—	—		Sunday Morning with Charley Pride
"A Whole Lotta Things to Sing About"	1976	—	2	—	—	—	1	—	—		She's Just an Old Love Turned Memory
"She's Just an Old Love Turned Memory"	1977	—	1	—	—	—	1	—	—		She's Just an Old Love Turned Memory
"I'll Be Leaving Alone"	1977	—	1	—	—	93	1	—	—		She's Just an Old Love Turned Memory
"More to Me"	1977	—	1	—	—	—	1	—	—		Someone Loves You Honey
"Someone Loves You Honey"	1978	—	1	—	—	—	1	—	—		Someone Loves You Honey
"When I Stop Leaving (I'll Be Gone)"	1978	—	3	—	—	—	1	—	—		Burgers and Fries/When I Stop Leaving (I'll Be Gone)
"Burgers and Fries"	1978	—	2	—	—	—	1	—	—		Burgers and Fries/When I Stop Leaving (I'll Be Gone)
"Where Do I Put Her Memory"	1979	—	1	—	—	—	1	—	—		Burgers and Fries/When I Stop Leaving (I'll Be Gone)
"You're My Jamaica"	1979	—	1	—	—	—	1	—	47		You're My Jamaica
"Missin' You"	1979	—	2	—	—	—	2	—	—		You're My Jamaica
"—" denotes a recording that did not chart or was not released in that territory.

=== 1980s–2010s ===
List of singles, with selected chart positions, and other relevant details
Title	Year	Peak chart positions				Album
Title	Year	US Cou.	AUS	CAN Cou.	NZ	Album
"Honky Tonk Blues"	1980	1	—	1	—	There's a Little Bit of Hank in Me
"You Win Again"	1980	1	—	2	—	There's a Little Bit of Hank in Me
"You Almost Slipped My Mind"	1980	4	—	5	—	Roll On Mississippi
"Roll On Mississippi"	1981	7	—	2	—	Roll On Mississippi
"Never Been So Loved (In All My Life)"	1981	1	—	1	—	Greatest Hits
"Mountain of Love"	1981	1	76	1	41	Charley Sings Everybody's Choice
"I Don't Think She's in Love Anymore"	1982	2	—	1	—	Charley Sings Everybody's Choice
"You're So Good When You're Bad"	1982	1	—	2	—	Charley Sings Everybody's Choice
"Why Baby Why"	1982	1	—	4	—	Charley Pride Live
"More and More"	1983	7	—	3	—	Country Classics
"Night Games"	1983	1	—	1	—	Night Games
"Ev'ry Heart Should Have One"	1983	2	—	7	—	Night Games
"Stagger Lee"	1984	—	—	—	—	Power of Love
"The Power of Love"	1984	9	—	11	—	Power of Love
"Missin' Mississippi"	1984	32	—	—	—	Power of Love
"Down on the Farm"	1985	25	—	33	—	Greatest Hits, Volume 2
"Let a Little Love Come In"	1985	34	—	—	—	Greatest Hits, Volume 2
"The Best There Is"	1985	75	—	—	—	The Best There Is
"Love on a Blue Rainy Day"	1986	74	—	—	—	The Best There Is
"Have I Got Some Blues for You"	1987	14	—	50	—	After All This Time
"If You Still Want a Fool Around"	1987	31	—	—	—	After All This Time
"Shouldn't It Be Easier Than This"	1987	5	—	29	—	I'm Gonna Love Her on the Radio
"I'm Gonna Love Her on the Radio"	1988	13	—	33	—	I'm Gonna Love Her on the Radio
"Where Was I"	1988	49	—	—	—	I'm Gonna Love Her on the Radio
"White Houses"	1989	49	—	—	—	Moody Woman
"The More I Do"	1989	77	—	—	—	Moody Woman
"Amy's Eyes"	1989	28	—	32	—	Moody Woman
"Moody Woman"	1990	— (Note: "Moody Woman" did not chart on Hot Country Songs, but peaked at No. 9 on Hot Country Radio Breakouts.)	—	—	—	Moody Woman
"Whole Lotta Love on the Line"	1990	—	—	—	—	The Best of Charley Pride
"You've Got to Stand for Something"	1992	—	—	—	—	Classics with Pride
"Just for the Love of It"	1993	—	—	—	—	My 6 Latest and 6 Greatest
"For Today" (with Hal Ketchum)	1994	—	—	—	—	My 6 Latest and 6 Greatest
"Except for You"	2011	—	—	—	—	Choices
"—" denotes a recording that did not chart or was not released in that territory.

== Guest singles ==
List of singles, with selected chart positions, and other relevant details
Title	Year	Peak chart positions						Certifications	Album
Title	Year	US	US Cou.	US Cou. Air.	AUS	CAN Cou.	CAN	Certifications	Album
"Forever Country" (as "Artists of Then, Now & Forever")	2016	21	1	32	26	34	25	RIAA: Gold	non-album single

== Promotional singles ==
List of singles, with selected chart positions, and other relevant details
Title	Year	Peak chart positions	Album
Title	Year	US Country	Album
"Dallas Cowboys"	1979	89	non-album single
"Let It Snow, Let It Snow, Let It Snow"	1982	—	A Country Christmas
"—" denotes a recording that did not chart or was not released in that territory.

== Other charted songs ==
List of singles, with selected chart positions, and other relevant details
Title	Year	Peak chart positions			Album
Title	Year	US	US Cou.	CAN Cou.	Album
"Let Me Live"	1971	— (Note: "Let Me Live" peaked at number four on the Billboard Bubbling Under Hot 100 singles chart, a list which acts as a 25-song extension of the Hot 100.)	21	37	Did You Think to Pray
"—" denotes a recording that did not chart or was not released in that territory.

== Music videos ==
List of music videos, showing year released and director
Title	Year	Director(s)	Ref.
"Ev'ry Heart Should Have One"	1984	Robert Small	
"Where Was I"	1988	—N/a	
"The More I Do"	1989	Steve Moss	
"White Houses"	1989	Steve Moss	
"Amy's Eyes"	1989	George Deaton	
"Moody Woman"	1990	George Deaton	
"Whole Lotta Love on the Line"	1990	Michael Merriman	
"Just for the Love for It"	1993	Jim Wheeler	
"For Today" (with Hal Ketchum)	1994	Tom Denolf	
"Forever Country"	2016	Joseph Kahn	
"Standing in My Way"	2017	Don Mills	
