= List of Hot Country Singles number ones of 1971 =

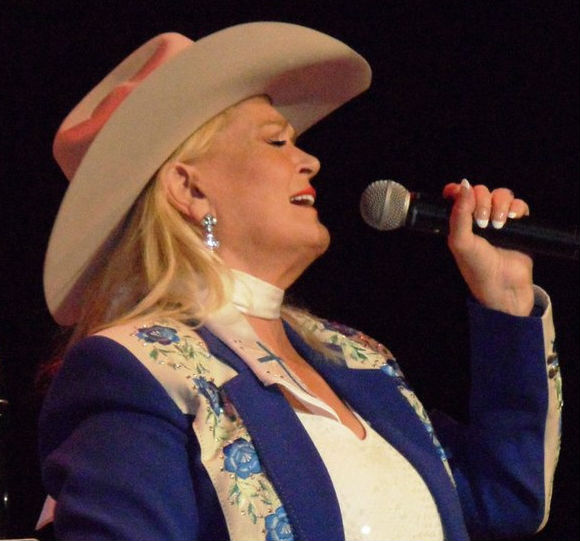
Lynn Anderson (pictured in 2011) had three number ones in 1971.

Hot Country Songs is a chart that ranks the top-performing country music songs in the United States, published by Billboard magazine. In 1971, 21 different singles topped the chart, at the time published under the title Hot Country Singles, in 52 issues of the magazine, based on playlists submitted by country music radio stations and sales reports supplied by stores.

The first number one of the year was Lynn Anderson's "Rose Garden", which was in its second week at number one in the issue of Billboard dated January 2, and remained at the top for three further weeks before being displaced by "Flesh and Blood" by Johnny Cash. Charley Pride had the highest total number of weeks at number one in 1971, topping the chart for 11 weeks with "I'd Rather Love You", "I'm Just Me" and "Kiss an Angel Good Mornin'". Lynn Anderson and Sonny James also each had three number ones during the year, as did Conway Twitty, who reached the top of the chart with one solo single and two duets with Loretta Lynn. The two singers would go on to achieve a string of duet hits in the 1970s and 1980s. The longest unbroken run at number one in 1971 was achieved by Jerry Reed with "When You're Hot, You're Hot", which spent five consecutive weeks at number one during the summer.

In the issue of Billboard dated February 6, Dolly Parton reached number one for the first time with the single "Joshua". Parton had risen to prominence when she began appearing alongside singer Porter Wagoner on his syndicated television show in 1967. She scored hits with duets with Wagoner as well as solo singles, and in 1971 achieved the first chart-topper of her career. She would go on to become the most successful female country performer of all time, as well as achieving considerable success in pop music and acting. "Joshua" was replaced in the top spot by another debut chart-topper for a female vocalist, "Help Me Make It Through the Night" by Sammi Smith, which was also a crossover hit, reaching the top 10 of Billboard's all-genre singles chart, the Hot 100. Freddie Hart also achieved his first country number one in 1971. Hart had signed his first recording contract in 1953 and gained his first Hot Country hit in 1959, but had never reached the top 10 until "Easy Loving" went to number one in September 1971. It began a consistent run of top 10 hits which lasted until 1975, when his chart placings fell away once again. The final number one of the year was Charley Pride's "Kiss an Angel Good Mornin'", which was number one for the last four weeks of 1971.

== Chart history ==
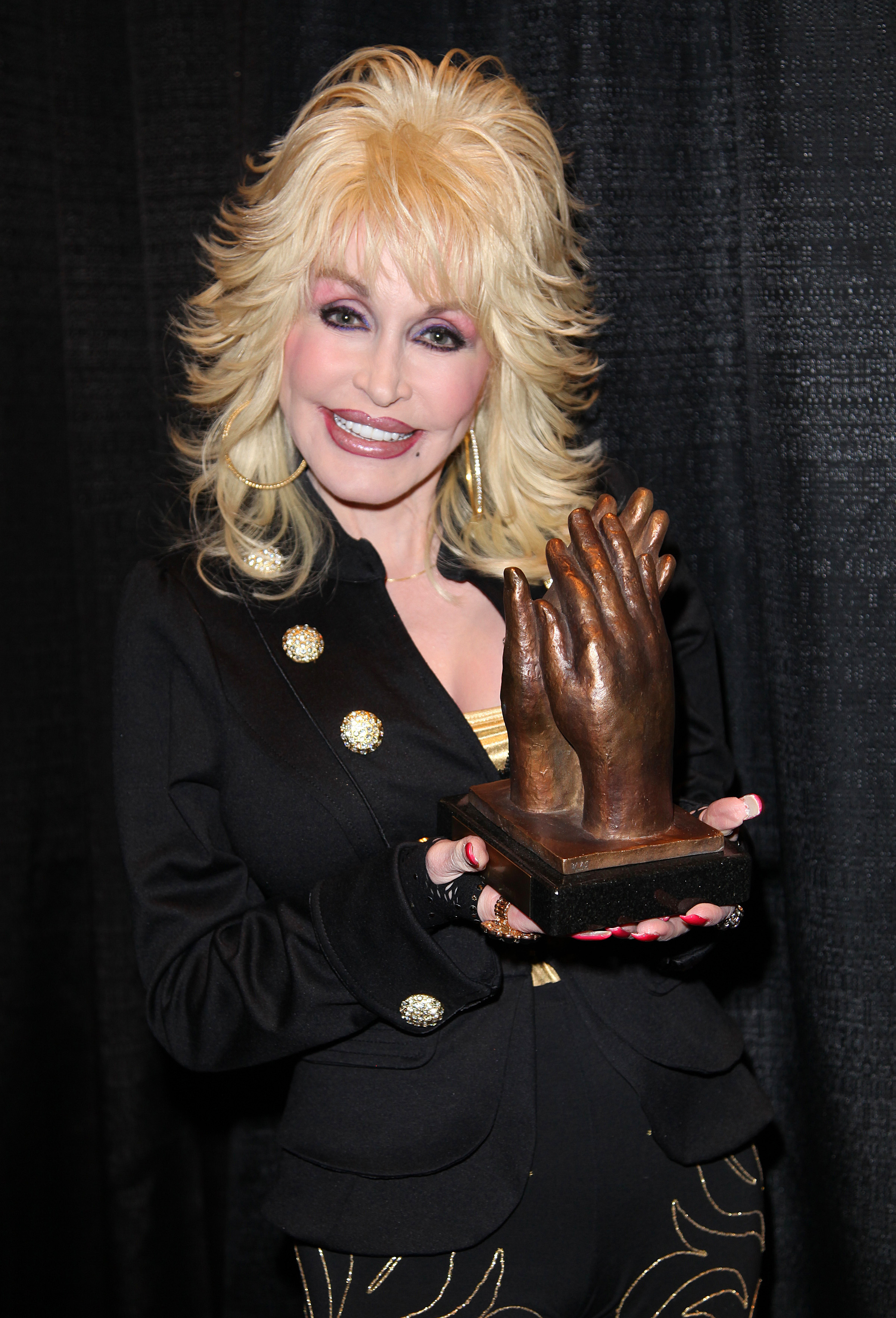
Dolly Parton (pictured in 2010) reached number one for the first time.

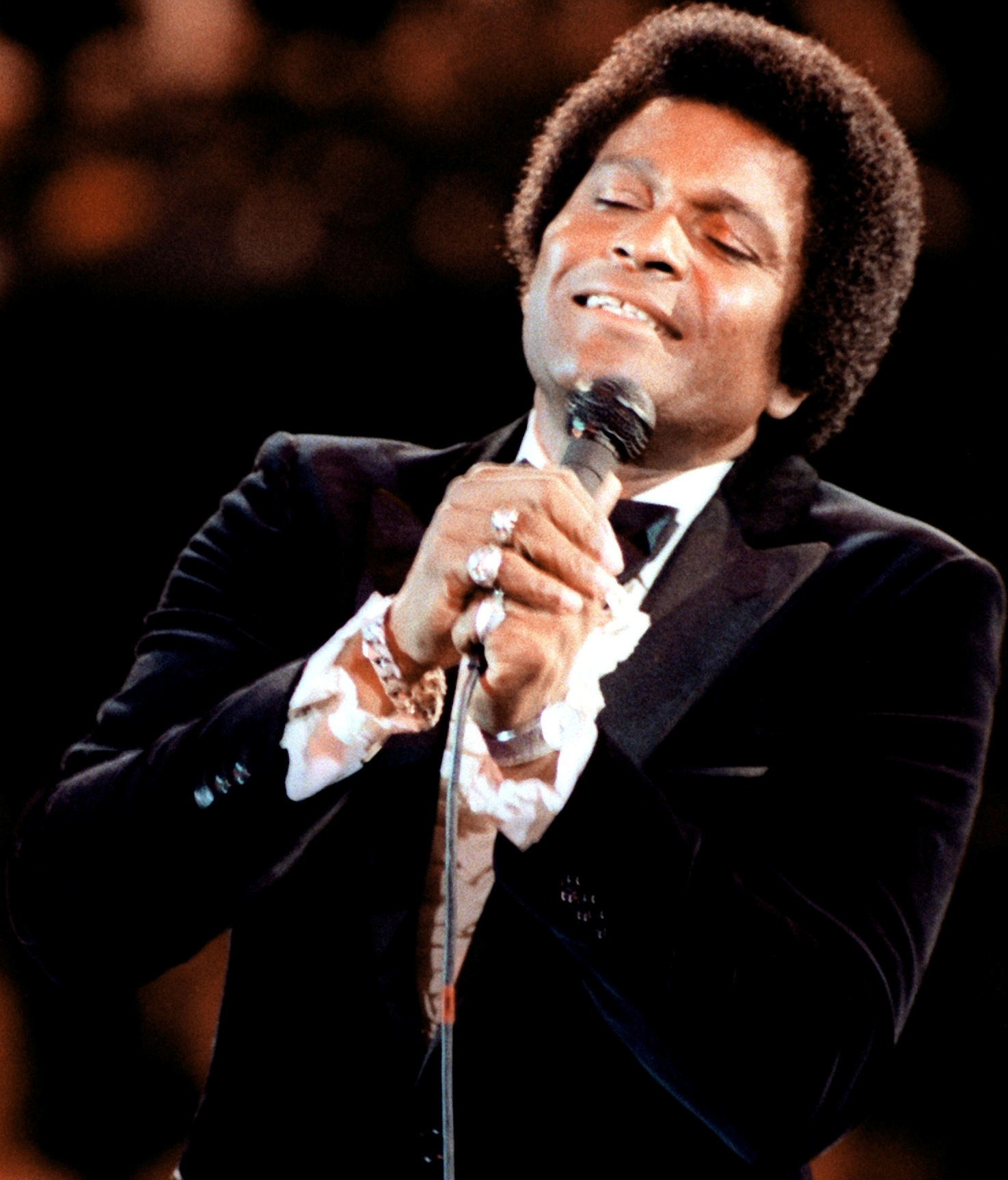
Charley Pride had three number ones in 1971 and spent the most weeks in the top spot of any artist.

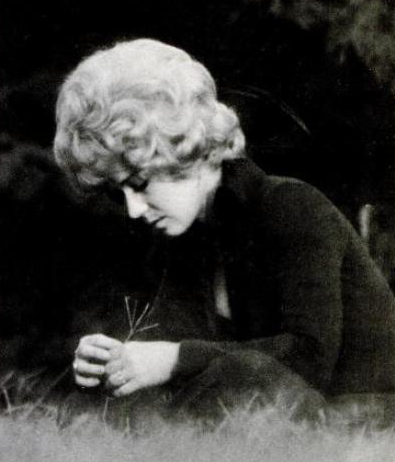
Sammi Smith was a first-time chart-topper with "Help Me Make It Through the Night".

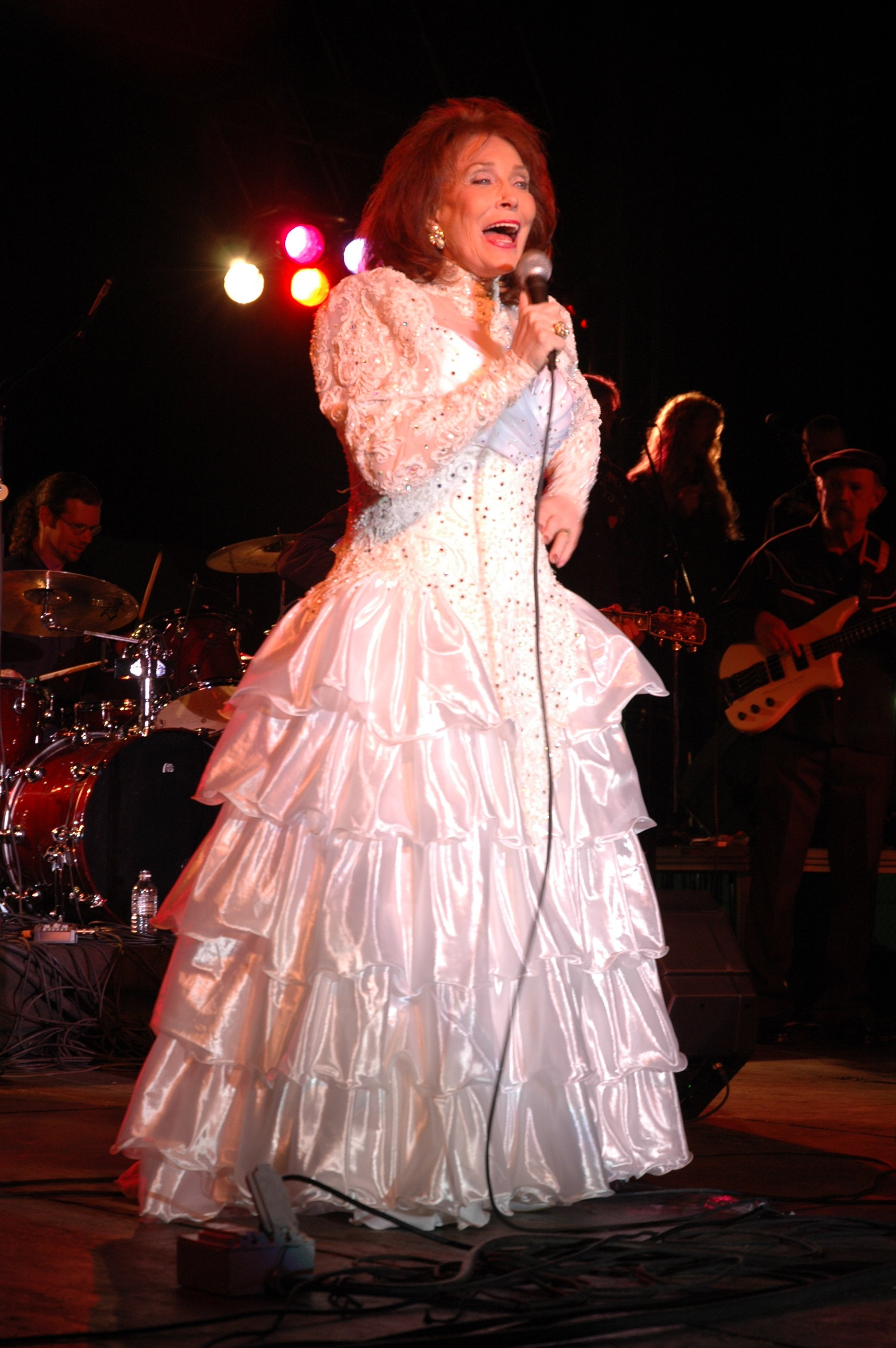
Loretta Lynn (pictured in 2005) had two chart-topping duets with Conway Twitty.

| Issue date | Title | Artist(s) | Ref. |
|---|---|---|---|
| January 2 | "Rose Garden" | Lynn Anderson | |
| January 9 | "Rose Garden" | Lynn Anderson | |
| January 16 | "Rose Garden" | Lynn Anderson | |
| January 23 | "Rose Garden" | Lynn Anderson | |
| January 30 | "Flesh and Blood" | Johnny Cash | |
| February 6 | "Joshua" | Dolly Parton | |
| February 13 | "Help Me Make It Through the Night" | Sammi Smith | |
| February 20 | "Help Me Make It Through the Night" | Sammi Smith | |
| February 27 | "Help Me Make It Through the Night" | Sammi Smith | |
| March 6 | "I'd Rather Love You" | Charley Pride | |
| March 13 | "I'd Rather Love You" | Charley Pride | |
| March 20 | "I'd Rather Love You" | Charley Pride | |
| March 27 | "After the Fire Is Gone" | Conway Twitty and Loretta Lynn | |
| April 3 | "After the Fire Is Gone" | Conway Twitty and Loretta Lynn | |
| April 10 | "Empty Arms" | Sonny James | |
| April 17 | "Empty Arms" | Sonny James | |
| April 24 | "Empty Arms" | Sonny James | |
| May 1 | "Empty Arms" | Sonny James | |
| May 8 | "How Much More Can She Stand" | Conway Twitty | |
| May 15 | "I Won't Mention It Again" | Ray Price | |
| May 22 | "I Won't Mention It Again" | Ray Price | |
| May 29 | "I Won't Mention It Again" | Ray Price | |
| June 5 | "You're My Man" | Lynn Anderson | |
| June 12 | "You're My Man" | Lynn Anderson | |
| June 19 | "When You're Hot, You're Hot" | Jerry Reed | |
| June 26 | "When You're Hot, You're Hot" | Jerry Reed | |
| July 3 | "When You're Hot, You're Hot" | Jerry Reed | |
| July 10 | "When You're Hot, You're Hot" | Jerry Reed | |
| July 17 | "When You're Hot, You're Hot" | Jerry Reed | |
| July 24 | "Bright Lights, Big City" | Sonny James | |
| July 31 | "I'm Just Me" | Charley Pride | |
| August 7 | "I'm Just Me" | Charley Pride | |
| August 14 | "I'm Just Me" | Charley Pride | |
| August 21 | "I'm Just Me" | Charley Pride | |
| August 28 | "Good Lovin' (Makes It Right)" | Tammy Wynette | |
| September 4 | "Good Lovin' (Makes It Right)" | Tammy Wynette | |
| September 11 | "Easy Loving" | Freddie Hart | |
| September 18 | "The Year That Clayton Delaney Died" | Tom T. Hall | |
| September 25 | "The Year That Clayton Delaney Died" | Tom T. Hall | |
| October 2 | "Easy Loving" | Freddie Hart | |
| October 9 | "Easy Loving" | Freddie Hart | |
| October 16 | "How Can I Unlove You" | Lynn Anderson | |
| October 23 | "How Can I Unlove You" | Lynn Anderson | |
| October 30 | "How Can I Unlove You" | Lynn Anderson | |
| November 6 | "Here Comes Honey Again" | Sonny James | |
| November 13 | "Lead Me On" | Conway Twitty and Loretta Lynn | |
| November 20 | "Daddy Frank (The Guitar Man)" | Merle Haggard | |
| November 27 | "Daddy Frank (The Guitar Man)" | Merle Haggard | |
| December 4 | "Kiss an Angel Good Mornin'" | Charley Pride | |
| December 11 | "Kiss an Angel Good Mornin'" | Charley Pride | |
| December 18 | "Kiss an Angel Good Mornin'" | Charley Pride | |
| December 25 | "Kiss an Angel Good Mornin'" | Charley Pride | |

== See also ==
- 1971 in music
- List of artists who reached number one on the U.S. country chart
