= Contemporary Country =

Contemporary Country is a 22-volume series issued by Time-Life during the early 1990s, spotlighting country music of the 1970s through mid 1990s.

Each volume in the series chronicled a specific time period – the early-1970s, the mid-1970s, the late-1970s, the early-1980s, the mid-1980s, the late-1980s, the early-1990s and the mid-1990s. Each volume was issued on a compact disc or cassette. Individual volumes contained 22 tracks, and represented the highlighted time period's most popular and noteworthy tracks. Also included was a booklet, containing liner notes written by some of the most respected historians of the genre, photographs of the artists, and information on the songs (writers, performers and peak position on Billboard magazine's country charts).

All told, the entire series contains 484 tracks.

== History ==
"Contemporary Country" was first issued during the summer of 1991, and essentially picked up where Time-Life Music left off with its Country USA series; the earlier series covered country music from the 1950s through early 1970s. This series continued Time-Life's attempt at chronicling country music's post-1950 history.

During its peak, the "Contemporary Country" series was advertised in television and magazine advertisements. The series was available by subscription (by calling a 1-800 number); those who purchased the series in that fashion received a new volume roughly every other month (on the format of their choice), and had the option of keeping the volumes they wanted. Each volume was also offered for individual sale.

New volumes continued to be issued through 1993, the final one being a volume covering country music from the early 1990s. Another volume – "The Mid-1990s," with 20 tracks from 1991 to 1998 – was released as part of the series in 2000, seven years after the last disc was issued.

Time-Life continued to offer "Contemporary Country" through the early 2000s (decade). The series has essentially been replaced four series:

- "Classic Country," a series cataloging the music from the 1940s through mid-1980s (with some additional volumes containing post-1984 music).
- "Country Gold," covering the 1980s through mid-1990s. Three volumes of "Contemporary Country" have been repackaged as part of this series. Also part of this series is "Country's Got Heart," providing post-1990 country music highlights.
- "Superstars of Country," containing highlights from the mid-1960s through mid-1980s.
- "Lifetime of Country Romance," similar to "Superstars of Country" but focusing more on ballads and love-themed songs.

== The series ==
As with many of Time-Life Records' multi-volume releases, the volumes were not issued in a logical, sequential order by date or era of the subject; that is, issuing volumes covering the early 1970s before progressing to the mid-1970s. In the track information section, the volumes will be listed sequentially by era; the following list is the order in which the volumes were released.

=== 1991 ===
- Contemporary Country: The Mid ‘80s
- Contemporary Country: The Late ‘70s
- Contemporary Country: The Early ‘80s
- Contemporary Country: The Mid ‘70s
- Contemporary Country: The Late ‘80s

=== 1992 ===
- Contemporary Country: The Early ‘70s
- Contemporary Country: The Mid '80s Pure Gold
- Contemporary Country: The Mid '70s Pure Gold
- Contemporary Country: The Early '80s Pure Gold
- Contemporary Country: The Late '70s Pure Gold
- Contemporary Country: The Late '80s Pure Gold
- Contemporary Country: The Early '70s Pure Gold
- Contemporary Country: The Mid '80s Hot Hits

=== 1993 ===
- Contemporary Country: The Late '70s Hot Hits
- Contemporary Country: The Early '80s Hot Hits
- Contemporary Country: The Mid '70s Hot Hits
- Contemporary Country: The Late '80s Hot Hits
- Contemporary Country: The Early '70s Hot Hits
- Contemporary Country: The '70s Pure Gold
- Contemporary Country: The '80s Pure Gold
- Contemporary Country: The Early '90s

=== 2000 ===
- Contemporary Country: The Mid '90s

== Track listing ==
=== Contemporary Country: The '70s Pure Gold ===
- "(Ghost) Riders in the Sky" – Johnny Cash
- "It's Been a Great Afternoon" – Merle Haggard
- "If I Could Only Win Your Love" – Emmylou Harris
- "All of Me" – Willie Nelson
- "Room Full of Roses" – Mickey Gilley
- "Among My Souvenirs" – Marty Robbins
- "You're the One" – Oak Ridge Boys
- "Rated "X"" – Loretta Lynn
- "Don't Be Angry" – Donna Fargo
- "I May Never Get to Heaven" – Conway Twitty
- "A Picture of Me" – George Jones
- "Ruby (Are You Mad)" – Buck Owens
- "Baby Boy" – Mary Kay Place (as Loretta Haggers)
- "Rednecks, White Socks and Blue Ribbon Beer" – Johnny Russell
- "Sometimes" – Bill Anderson and Mary Lou Turner
- "Feelins'" – Conway Twitty and Loretta Lynn
- "Before My Time" – John Conlee
- "I'll Go to My Grave Loving You" – Statler Brothers
- "Me and Bobby McGee" – Jerry Lee Lewis
- "Say It Again" – Don Williams
- "Broken Down in Tiny Pieces" – Billy "Crash" Craddock
- "Secret Love" – Freddy Fender

=== Contemporary Country: The Early '70s ===
- "The Fightin' Side of Me" – Merle Haggard
- "Coal Miner's Daughter" – Loretta Lynn
- "Easy Loving" – Freddie Hart
- "Woman (Sensuous Woman)" – Don Gibson
- "Hello Darlin'" – Conway Twitty
- "Would You Take Another Chance on Me" – Jerry Lee Lewis
- "He Loves Me All the Way" – Tammy Wynette
- "Loving You Could Never Be Better" – George Jones
- "Empty Arms" – Sonny James
- "Help Me Make It Through the Night" – Sammi Smith
- "For the Good Times" – Ray Price
- "Me and Little Andy" – Dolly Parton
- "Kiss an Angel Good Morning" – Charley Pride
- "The Happiest Girl in the Whole U.S.A." – Donna Fargo
- "Made in Japan" – Buck Owens
- "Behind Closed Doors" – Charlie Rich
- "When You're Hot, You're Hot" – Jerry Reed
- "Rose Garden" – Lynn Anderson
- "Lead Me On" – Conway Twitty and Loretta Lynn
- "The Year That Clayton Delaney Died" – Tom T. Hall
- "Why Me" – Kris Kristofferson
- "Sunday Morning Coming Down" – Johnny Cash

=== Contemporary Country: The Early '70s Pure Gold ===
- "You're Lookin' At Country" – Loretta Lynn
- "I Ain't Never" – Mel Tillis
- "How I Got to Memphis" – Bobby Bare
- "It's Not Love" – Merle Haggard
- "How Much More Can She Stand" – Conway Twitty
- "Lovin' on Back Streets" – Mel Street
- "She's All I Got" – Johnny Paycheck
- "After the Fire Is Gone" – Conway Twitty and Loretta Lynn
- "The Lord Knows I'm Drinking" – Cal Smith
- "A Good Year for the Roses" – George Jones
- "My Hang-Up Is You" – Freddie Hart
- "Rollin' in My Sweet Baby's Arms" – Buck Owens
- "Coat of Many Colors" – Dolly Parton
- "Is Anybody Goin' to San Antone" – Charley Pride
- "Soul Song" – Joe Stampley
- "Flesh and Blood" – Johnny Cash
- "Think About It Darlin'" – Jerry Lee Lewis
- "What's Your Mama's Name" – Tanya Tucker
- "Ridin' My Thumb to Mexico" – Johnny Rodriguez
- "'Til I Get It Right" – Tammy Wynette
- "It's Four in the Morning" – Faron Young
- "I Won't Mention It Again" – Ray Price

=== Contemporary Country: Early '70s Hot Hits ===
- "Mr. Lovemaker" – Johnny Paycheck
- "We're Gonna Hold On" – George Jones and Tammy Wynette
- "Borrowed Angel" – Mel Street
- "Good Hearted Woman" – Waylon Jennings
- "Man in Black" – Johnny Cash
- "I'm Just Me" – Charley Pride
- "One's on the Way" – Loretta Lynn
- "Do You Remember These" – Statler Brothers
- "You Always Come Back (To Hurting Me)" – Johnny Rodriguez
- "Fifteen Years Ago" – Conway Twitty
- "Once More with Feeling" – Jerry Lee Lewis
- "I'm a Truck" – Red Simpson
- "Big in Vegas" – Buck Owens
- "The Pool Shark" – Dave Dudley
- "We Can Make It" – George Jones
- "It's Just a Matter of Time" – Sonny James
- "Daddy Was an Old Time Preacher Man" – Porter Wagoner & Dolly Parton
- "Come Sundown" – Bobby Bare
- "Just One Time" – Connie Smith
- "Got the All Overs for You (All over Me)" – Freddie Hart
- "If You Leave Me Tonight I'll Cry" – Jerry Wallace
- "Eleven Roses" – Hank Williams Jr.

=== Contemporary Country: The Mid '70s ===
- "The Grand Tour" – George Jones
- "She's Actin' Single (I'm Drinkin' Doubles)" – Gary Stewart
- "Louisiana Woman, Mississippi Man" – Conway Twitty and Loretta Lynn
- "You're My Best Friend" – Don Williams
- "Together Again" – Emmylou Harris
- "Before the Next Teardrop Falls" – Freddy Fender
- "Don't the Girls All Get Prettier at Closing Time" – Mickey Gilley
- "(Hey Won't You Play) Another Somebody Done Somebody Wrong Song" – B.J. Thomas
- "Would You Lay with Me" – Tanya Tucker
- "Blue Eyes Crying in the Rain" – Willie Nelson
- "El Paso City" – Marty Robbins
- "Rhinestone Cowboy" – Glen Campbell
- "The Most Beautiful Girl" – Charlie Rich
- "You've Never Been This Far Before" – Conway Twitty
- "Jolene" – Dolly Parton
- "If We Make It Through December" – Merle Haggard
- "Are You Sure Hank Done It This Way" – Waylon Jennings
- "Satin Sheets" – Jeanne Pruett
- "I Love" – Tom T. Hall
- "I'm Not Lisa" – Jessi Colter
- "'Til the Rivers All Run Dry" – Don Williams
- "Reconsider Me" – Narvel Felts

=== Contemporary Country: The Mid '70s Pure Gold ===
- "I Can Help" – Billy Swan
- "All These Things" – Joe Stampley
- "Love Is Like a Butterfly" – Dolly Parton
- "(Turn Out the Light And) Love Me Tonight" – Don Williams
- "The Door" – George Jones
- "Wasted Days and Wasted Nights" – Freddy Fender
- "Hank Williams, You Wrote My Life" – Moe Bandy
- "Drinkin' Thing" – Gary Stewart
- "I Never Go Around Mirrors" – Lefty Frizzell
- "Country Bumpkin" – Cal Smith
- "Sweet Dreams" – Emmylou Harris
- "Faster Horses (The Cowboy and the Poet)" – Tom T. Hall
- "Love Is the Foundation" – Loretta Lynn
- "(I'm A) Stand by My Woman Man" – Ronnie Milsap
- "'Til I Can Make It on My Own" – Tammy Wynette
- "I See the Want To in Your Eyes" – Conway Twitty
- "Just Get Up and Close the Door" – Johnny Rodriguez
- "A Very Special Love Song" – Charlie Rich
- "San Antonio Stroll" – Tanya Tucker
- "If You've Got the Money I've Got the Time" – Willie Nelson
- "One Piece at a Time" – Johnny Cash
- "Convoy" – C.W. McCall

=== Contemporary Country: The Mid '70s Hot Hits ===
- "As Soon as I Hang Up the Phone" – Conway Twitty and Loretta Lynn
- "Out of Hand" – Gary Stewart
- "I'm a Ramblin' Man" – Waylon Jennings
- "Stranger" – Johnny Duncan
- "Once You've Had the Best" – George Jones
- "Devil in the Bottle" – T.G. Sheppard
- "Blood Red and Goin' Down" – Tanya Tucker
- "It's Time to Pay the Fiddler" – Cal Smith
- "The Bargain Store" – Dolly Parton
- "Love in the Hot Afternoon" – Gene Watson
- "Somebody Somewhere (Don't Know What He's Missin' Tonight)" – Loretta Lynn
- "Rub It In" – Billy "Crash" Craddock
- "Daydreams About Night Things" – Ronnie Milsap
- "After All the Good Is Gone" – Conway Twitty
- "Golden Ring" – George Jones and Tammy Wynette
- "I Wouldn't Want to Live If You Didn't Love Me" – Don Williams
- "9,999,999 Tears" – Dickey Lee
- "You'll Lose a Good Thing" – Freddy Fender
- "Country Sunshine" – Dottie West
- "Blanket on the Ground" – Billie Jo Spears
- "I Just Can't Get Her Out of My Mind" – Johnny Rodriguez
- "Teddy Bear" – Red Sovine

=== Contemporary Country: The Late '70s ===
- "Family Tradition" – Hank Williams Jr.
- "Heaven's Just a Sin Away" – The Kendalls
- "It's a Cheating Situation" – Moe Bandy
- "Mammas Don't Let Your Babies Grow Up to Be Cowboys" – Waylon Jennings and Willie Nelson
- "It Was Almost Like a Song" – Ronnie Milsap
- "Ramblin' Fever" – Merle Haggard
- "Here You Come Again" – Dolly Parton
- "If I Said You Had a Beautiful Body Would You Hold It Against Me" – Bellamy Brothers
- "Near You" – George Jones and Tammy Wynette
- "Happy Birthday Darlin'" – Conway Twitty
- "Blue Skies" – Willie Nelson
- "Two More Bottles of Wine" – Emmylou Harris
- "Take This Job and Shove It" – Johnny Paycheck
- "Rose Colored Glasses" – John Conlee
- "Don't It Make My Brown Eyes Blue" – Crystal Gayle
- "Moody Blue" – Elvis Presley
- "Tulsa Time" – Don Williams
- "Luckenbach, Texas (Back to the Basics of Love)" – Waylon Jennings
- "Southern Nights" – Glen Campbell
- "Bartender's Blues" – George Jones (feat. James Taylor)
- "Sleeping Single in a Double Bed" – Barbara Mandrell
- "The Devil Went Down to Georgia" – Charlie Daniels Band

=== Contemporary Country: The Late '70s Pure Gold ===
- "Just Good Ol' Boys" – Moe Bandy and Joe Stampley
- "Whiskey Bent and Hell Bound" – Hank Williams Jr.
- "I'm Always on a Mountain When I Fall" – Merle Haggard
- "Don't Take It Away" – Conway Twitty
- "Talking in Your Sleep" – Crystal Gayle
- "She Can Put Her Shoes Under My Bed (Anytime)" – Johnny Duncan
- "It's All Wrong, But It's All Right" – Dolly Parton
- "Last Cheater's Waltz" – T.G. Sheppard
- "She's Got You" – Loretta Lynn
- "Amanda" – Waylon Jennings
- "Middle Age Crazy" – Jerry Lee Lewis
- "It Must Be Love" – Don Williams
- "Do You Know You Are My Sunshine" – Statler Brothers
- "Why Have You Left the One You Left Me For" – Crystal Gayle
- "Y'all Come Back Saloon" – Oak Ridge Boys
- "Farewell Party" – Gene Watson
- "Georgia on My Mind" – Willie Nelson
- "Blue Bayou" – Linda Ronstadt
- "Rollin' with the Flow" – Charlie Rich
- "Backside of Thirty" – John Conlee
- "You Needed Me" – Anne Murray
- "Only One Love in My Life" – Ronnie Milsap

=== Contemporary Country: The Late '70s Hot Hits ===
- "Out of My Head and Back in My Bed" – Loretta Lynn
- "I've Always Been Crazy" – Waylon Jennings
- "I've Already Loved You in My Mind" – Conway Twitty
- "Back on My Mind Again" – Ronnie Milsap
- "Way Down" – Elvis Presley
- "I'm the Only Hell (My Mama Ever Raised)" – Johnny Paycheck
- "It Couldn't Have Been Any Better" – Johnny Duncan
- "I'm Just a Country Boy" – Don Williams
- "There Ain't No Good Chain Gang" – Johnny Cash and Waylon Jennings
- "Paper Rosie" – Gene Watson
- "Someone Loves You Honey" – Charley Pride
- "Don't You Think This Outlaw Bit's Done Got Out of Hand" – Waylon Jennings
- "If We're Not Back in Love by Monday" – Merle Haggard
- "I Cheated Me Right Out of You" – Moe Bandy
- "Sweet Desire" – The Kendalls
- "On My Knees" – Charlie Rich (with Janie Fricke)
- "Heartbreaker" – Dolly Parton
- "Golden Tears" – Dave and Sugar
- "Lady Lay Down" – John Conlee
- "The Rains Came" – Freddy Fender
- "Nobody Likes Sad Songs" – Ronnie Milsap
- "Where Do I Put Her Memory" – Charley Pride

=== Contemporary Country: The '80s Pure Gold ===
- "Am I Blue" – George Strait
- "Hey Bartender" – Johnny Lee
- "(Do You Love Me) Just Say Yes" – Highway 101
- "I'll Come Back as Another Woman" – Tanya Tucker
- "She Can't Say That Anymore" – John Conlee
- "Still Doin' Time" – George Jones
- "How Blue" – Reba McEntire
- "I Think I'll Just Stay Here and Drink" – Merle Haggard
- "I've Been Around Enough to Know" – John Schneider
- "Fool for Your Love" – Mickey Gilley
- "Last Thing I Needed First Thing This Morning" – Willie Nelson
- "Dixieland Delight" – Alabama
- "Are You Ever Gonna Love Me" – Holly Dunn
- "My Baby's Got Good Timing" – Dan Seals
- "Can't Stop My Heart from Loving You" – O'Kanes
- "No Place Like Home" – Randy Travis
- "Chiseled in Stone" – Vern Gosdin
- "You're Out Doing What I'm Here Doing Without" – Gene Watson
- "Black Sheep" – John Anderson
- "Crazy Over You" – Foster & Lloyd
- "But You Know I Love You" – Dolly Parton
- "Beneath Still Waters" – Emmylou Harris

=== Contemporary Country: The Early '80s ===
- "Somewhere Between Right and Wrong" – Earl Thomas Conley
- "Wild and Blue" – John Anderson
- "Seven Year Ache" – Rosanne Cash
- "You're Gonna Ruin My Bad Reputation" – Ronnie McDowell
- "Love in the First Degree" – Alabama
- "Houston (Means I'm One Day Closer to You)" – Larry Gatlin and The Gatlin Brothers
- "Slow Hand" – Conway Twitty
- "(There's) No Gettin' Over Me" – Ronnie Milsap
- "Crying My Heart Out Over You" – Ricky Skaggs
- "I Will Always Love You" – Dolly Parton
- "A Country Boy Can Survive" – Hank Williams Jr.
- "Big City" – Merle Haggard
- "Lookin' for Love" – Johnny Lee
- "You're the First Time I've Thought About Leaving" – Reba McEntire
- "You're the Reason God Made Oklahoma" – David Frizzell and Shelly West
- "He Stopped Loving Her Today" – George Jones
- "I Love a Rainy Night" – Eddie Rabbitt
- "American Made" – Oak Ridge Boys
- "Islands in the Stream" – Kenny Rogers and Dolly Parton
- "I Believe in You" – Don Williams
- "Could I Have This Dance" – Anne Murray
- "On the Road Again" – Willie Nelson

=== Contemporary Country: The Early '80s Pure Gold ===
- "I Ain't Living Long Like This" – Waylon Jennings
- "Heartbroke" – Ricky Skaggs
- "Fourteen Carat Mind" – Gene Watson
- "I Always Get Lucky with You" – George Jones
- "All My Rowdy Friends (Have Settled Down)" – Hank Williams Jr.
- "Can't Even Get the Blues" – Reba McEntire
- "Night Games" – Charley Pride
- "My Heart" – Ronnie Milsap
- "Pancho and Lefty" – Willie Nelson and Merle Haggard
- "The Closer You Get" – Alabama
- "I Was Country When Country Wasn't Cool" – Barbara Mandrell (with George Jones)
- "Swingin'" – John Anderson
- "I'd Love to Lay You Down" – Conway Twitty
- "Elvira" – Oak Ridge Boys
- "Somebody's Knockin'" – Teri Gibbs
- "Good Ole Boys Like Me" – Don Williams
- "Amarillo by Morning" – George Strait
- "My Heroes Have Always Been Cowboys" – Willie Nelson
- "I'm Gonna Hire a Wino to Decorate Our Home" – David Frizzell
- "Thirty-Nine and Holding" – Jerry Lee Lewis
- "Blue Moon with Heartache" – Rosanne Cash
- "My Favorite Memory" – Merle Haggard

=== Contemporary Country: The Early '80s Hot Hits ===
- "My Baby Thinks He's a Train" – Rosanne Cash
- "I'm Just an Old Chunk of Coal (But I'm Gonna Be a Diamond Someday)" – John Anderson
- "Bobbie Sue" – Oak Ridge Boys
- "Love Is on a Roll" – Don Williams
- "Tennessee Whiskey" – George Jones
- "Always on My Mind" – Willie Nelson
- "Theme from The Dukes of Hazzard (Good Ol' Boys)" – Waylon Jennings
- "Party Time" – T.G. Sheppard
- "Pickin' Up Strangers" – Johnny Lee
- "You Win Again" – Charley Pride
- "Are the Good Times Really Over (I Wish a Buck Was Still Silver)" – Merle Haggard
- "Mountain Music" – Alabama
- "Guitar Man" – Elvis Presley
- "Common Man" – John Conlee
- "Older Women" – Ronnie McDowell
- "Dancin' Cowboys" – Bellamy Brothers
- "9 to 5" – Dolly Parton
- "Fire and Smoke" – Earl Thomas Conley
- "Two Story House" – George Jones and Tammy Wynette
- "Any Day Now" – Ronnie Milsap
- "The Sweetest Thing (I've Ever Known)" –Juice Newton
- "She Left Love All Over Me" – Razzy Bailey

=== Contemporary Country: The Mid '80s ===
- "Guitars, Cadillacs" – Dwight Yoakam
- "Guitar Town" – Steve Earle
- "Mama He's Crazy" – The Judds
- "Does Fort Worth Ever Cross Your Mind" – George Strait
- "Highwayman" – Willie Nelson, Waylon Jennings, Johnny Cash & Kris Kristofferson
- "Nobody Loves Me Like You Do" – Anne Murray and Dave Loggins
- "I Can Tell by the Way You Dance (You're Gonna Love Me Tonight)" – Vern Gosdin
- "Morning Desire" – Kenny Rogers
- "Too Much on My Heart" – Statler Brothers
- "That's the Way Love Goes" – Merle Haggard
- "Lost in the Fifties Tonight (In the Still of the Night)" – Ronnie Milsap
- "Mind Your Own Business" – Hank Williams Jr.
- "Never Be You" – Rosanne Cash
- "Baby's Got Her Blue Jeans On" – Mel McDaniel
- "Bop" – Dan Seals
- "Real Love" – Dolly Parton and Kenny Rogers
- "Roll On (Eighteen Wheeler)" – Alabama
- "Modern Day Romance" – Nitty Gritty Dirt Band
- "On the Other Hand" – Randy Travis
- "Mama's Never Seen Those Eyes" – Forester Sisters
- "Dixie Road" – Lee Greenwood
- "Country Boy" – Ricky Skaggs

=== Contemporary Country: The Mid '80s Pure Gold ===
- "Diggin' Up Bones" – Randy Travis
- "Let's Chase Each Other Around the Room" – Merle Haggard
- "She Sure Got Away with My Heart" – John Anderson
- "I'll Never Stop Loving You" – Gary Morris
- "Whoever's in New England" – Reba McEntire
- "High Horse" – Nitty Gritty Dirt Band
- "Desperado Love" – Conway Twitty
- "Elizabeth" – Statler Brothers
- "She's Single Again" – Janie Frickie
- "Mona Lisa Lost Her Smile" – David Allan Coe
- "Cry" – Crystal Gayle
- "Honky Tonk Man" – Dwight Yoakam
- "Have Mercy" – The Judds
- "She's My Rock" – George Jones
- "I Fell in Love Again Last Night" – Forester Sisters
- "She Keeps the Home Fires Burning" – Ronnie Milsap
- "You're the Last Thing I Needed Tonight" – John Schneider
- "Tennessee Homesick Blues" – Dolly Parton
- "I Got Mexico" – Eddy Raven
- "If You're Gonna Play in Texas (You Gotta Have a Fiddle in the Band)" – Alabama
- "All My Rowdy Friends Are Coming Over Tonight" – Hank Williams Jr.
- "Old Hippie" – Bellamy Brothers

=== Contemporary Country: The Mid '80s Hot Hits ===
- "I Don't Know Why You Don't Want Me" – Rosanne Cash
- "Life's Highway" – Steve Wariner
- "Why Not Me" – The Judds
- "What's a Memory Like You (Doing in a Love Like This)" – John Schneider
- "Somebody Should Leave" – Reba McEntire
- "(There's A) Fire in the Night" – Alabama
- "Thank God for the Radio" – The Kendalls
- "Forgiving You Was Easy" – Willie Nelson
- "Natural High" – Merle Haggard (with Janie Fricke)
- "Who's Gonna Fill Their Shoes" – George Jones
- "1982" – Randy Travis
- "Uncle Pen" – Ricky Skaggs
- "Hello Mary Lou" – Statler Brothers
- "Country State of Mind" – Hank Williams Jr.
- "The Chair" – George Strait
- "Radio Heart" – Charly McClain
- "Touch a Hand, Make a Friend" – Oak Ridge Boys
- "I Tell It Like It Used to Be" – T. Graham Brown
- "Until I Met You" – Judy Rodman
- "In My Eyes" – John Conlee
- "That's the Thing About Love" – Don Williams
- "Only a Lonely Heart Knows" – Barbara Mandrell

=== Contemporary Country: The Late '80s ===
- "A Better Man" – Clint Black
- "Cry, Cry, Cry" – Highway 101
- "I Told You So" – Randy Travis
- "I'll Always Come Back" – K.T. Oslin
- "I Wonder Do You Think of Me" – Keith Whitley
- "The Moon Is Still Over Her Shoulder" – Michael Johnson
- "There's a Tear in My Beer" – Hank Williams Jr. & Sr.
- "Set 'Em Up Joe" – Vern Gosdin
- "The Bluest Eyes in Texas" – Restless Heart
- "If You Change Your Mind" – Rosanne Cash
- "What Am I Gonna Do About You" – Reba McEntire
- "Twinkle, Twinkle Lucky Star" – Merle Haggard
- "Fishin' in the Dark" – Nitty Gritty Dirt Band
- "Strong Enough to Bend" – Tanya Tucker
- "Ocean Front Property" – George Strait
- "Cry Myself to Sleep" – The Judds
- "Somebody Lied" – Ricky Van Shelton
- "Joe Knows How to Live" – Eddy Raven
- "The Wanderer" – Eddie Rabbitt
- "Timber, I'm Falling in Love" – Patty Loveless
- "High Cotton" – Alabama
- "Eighteen Wheels and a Dozen Roses" – Kathy Mattea
- "A Woman in Love" – Ronnie Milsap
- "We Believe in Happy Endings" – Earl Thomas Conley & Emmylou Harris

=== Contemporary Country: The Late '80s Pure Gold ===
- "Streets of Bakersfield" – Dwight Yoakam and Buck Owens
- "Blue Side of Town" – Patty Loveless
- "I Couldn't Leave You If I Tried" – Rodney Crowell
- "The Way We Make a Broken Heart" – Rosanne Cash
- "Don't Close Your Eyes" – Keith Whitley
- "The Church on Cumberland Road" – Shenandoah
- "Darlene" – T. Graham Brown
- "Somewhere Tonight" – Highway 101
- "The Last One to Know" – Reba McEntire
- "Deeper Than the Holler" – Randy Travis
- "Living Proof" – Ricky Van Shelton
- "Born to Boogie" – Hank Williams Jr.
- "This Crazy Love" – Oak Ridge Boys
- "New Shade of Blue" – Southern Pacific
- "Love Me Like You Used To" – Tanya Tucker
- "I Got Dreams" – Steve Wariner
- "Change of Heart" – The Judds
- "Song of the South" – Alabama
- "Do Ya" – K.T. Oslin
- "I've Been Lookin'" – Nitty Gritty Dirt Band
- "(I'd Choose) You Again" – Forester Sisters
- "A Long Line of Love" – Michael Martin Murphey

=== Contemporary Country: The Late '80s Hot Hits ===
- "All My Ex's Live in Texas" – George Strait
- "A Little Bit in Love" – Patty Loveless
- "I Sang Dixie" – Dwight Yoakam
- "Don't Go to Strangers" – T. Graham Brown
- "80's Ladies" – K.T. Oslin
- "I'm No Stranger to the Rain" – Keith Whitley
- "If It Don't Come Easy" – Tanya Tucker
- "Lynda" – Steve Wariner
- "Love Someone Like Me" – Holly Dunn
- "One Promise Too Late" – Reba McEntire
- "Chill Factor" – Merle Haggard
- "Too Gone Too Long" – Randy Travis
- "Whiskey, If You Were a Woman" – Highway 101
- "She's Got a Single Thing in Mind" – Conway Twitty
- "Fallin' Again" – Alabama
- "Goin' Gone" – Kathy Mattea
- "Rose in Paradise" – Waylon Jennings
- "Midnight Girl/Sunset Town" – Sweethearts of the Rodeo
- "Gonna Take a Lot of River" – Oak Ridge Boys
- "Sunday in the South" – Shenandoah
- "Mornin' Ride" – Lee Greenwood
- "Burnin' a Hole in My Heart" – Skip Ewing

=== Contemporary Country: The Early '90s ===
- "Brand New Man" – Brooks & Dunn
- "Some Girls Do" – Sawyer Brown
- "Jealous Bone" – Patty Loveless
- "It Only Hurts When I Cry" – Dwight Yoakam
- "Here's a Quarter (Call Someone Who Cares)" – Travis Tritt
- "Cadillac Style" – Sammy Kershaw
- "Come On Back" – Carlene Carter
- "Love's Got a Hold on You" – Alan Jackson
- "Mirror, Mirror" – Diamond Rio
- "Small Town Saturday Night" – Hal Ketchum
- "Take It Like a Man" – Michelle Wright
- "There Ain't Nothin' Wrong with the Radio" – Aaron Tippin
- "Old Flames Have New Names" – Mark Chesnutt
- "Better Class of Losers" – Randy Travis
- "Down to My Last Teardrop" – Tanya Tucker
- "Runnin' Behind" – Tracy Lawrence
- "Liza Jane" – Vince Gill
- "Hillbilly Rock" – Marty Stuart
- "Don't Tell Me What to Do" – Pam Tillis
- "Lovin' All Night" – Rodney Crowell
- "We Both Walk" – Lorrie Morgan
- "Beer and Bones" – John Michael Montgomery

=== Contemporary Country: The Mid '90s ===
- "Don't Rock the Jukebox" – Alan Jackson
- "It's a Little Too Late" – Mark Chesnutt
- "The Shoes You're Wearing" – Clint Black
- "Mi Vida Loca (My Crazy Life)" – Pam Tillis
- "Blame It On Your Heart" – Patty Loveless
- "Down Home" – Alabama
- "Pickup Man" – Joe Diffie
- "Don't Let Our Love Start Slippin' Away" – Vince Gill
- "Love a Little Stronger" – Diamond Rio
- "Why Didn't I Think of That" – Doug Stone
- "No News" – Lonestar
- "Six Days on the Road" – Sawyer Brown
- "This Woman and This Man" – Clay Walker
- "That's as Close as I'll Get to Loving You" – Aaron Tippin
- "What Part of No" – Lorrie Morgan
- "I See It Now" – Tracy Lawrence
- "Money in the Bank" – John Anderson
- "Every Once in a While" – BlackHawk
- "Heads Carolina, Tails California" – Jo Dee Messina
- "I Can Still Make Cheyenne" – George Strait
