= Sunday Morning with Charley Pride =

Studio album by Charley Pride
- Released: April 1976
- Recorded: January 1974
- Studio: RCA Studio A, Nashville, Tennessee
- Genre: Country; gospel
- Label: RCA Victor
- Producer: Jerry Bradley

Charley Pride chronology
The Happiness of Having You (1975)	Sunday Morning with Charley Pride (1976)	She's Just an Old Love Turned Memory (1976)

Singles from Sunday Morning with Charley Pride
- 1. "I Don't Deserve a Mansion" Released: May 1976

Sunday Morning with Charley Pride is a studio album by American country music artist Charley Pride. It was released in April 1976 via RCA Victor Records and was produced by Jerry Bradley. It was Pride's twenty second studio record released in his music career and contained ten tracks. The album was also Pride's second collection of gospel recordings.

== Background and content ==
In 1971, Charley Pride released his first gospel collection titled, Did You Think to Pray. Spawning the minor hit, "Let Me Live," the album would win a Grammy Award and Pride would continue having a successful country music career in the 1970s. The success of his first gospel album inspired the release of Sunday Morning with Charley Pride. The project had actually been recorded two years prior, in January 1974. Sessions were held at the RCA Victor Studio, located in Nashville, Tennessee. The sessions were produced by Jerry Bradley. The album consisted of ten tracks. All of the album's tracks were new recordings of gospel recordings. They featured vocal accompaniment by the Nashville Edition and the Jordanaires.

== Release and reception ==
Sunday Morning with Charley Pride was released in April 1976 on RCA Victor Records. Its release would make it Pride's twenty second studio album released in his career. The album was distributed as a vinyl LP, containing five songs on each side of the record. In the 2010s, it was reissued in a digital format to music download and streaming services, including Apple Music. The album spent a total of 11 weeks on the Billboard Top Country Albums and peaked at number 14 in July 1976. The album spawned one single, "I Don't Deserve a Mansion." The song was issued as a single on RCA Victor, but failed to make any Billboard chart publications. In 1976, the album would receive an accolade for Best Gospel Album by a Non-Gospel Artist at the 8th GMA Dove Awards. In later years, Allmusic would give the record a rating of 2 out of 5 stars.

== Track listing ==
=== Vinyl version ===
Side one
No.	Title	Writer(s)	Length
1.	"I Don't Deserve a Mansion"	John Schweers; Winnie Simms	2:06
2.	"Be Grateful"	Don Hosea	2:17
3.	"He's the Man"	George Place	3:33
4.	"In Jesus' Name I Pray"	Paul Gibbons; Jerry Grindele; Tony Hatch	2:36
5.	"Without Mama Here"	Sue Lane	2:57

Side two
No.	Title	Writer(s)	Length
1.	"Little Delta Church"	George Knight	3:38
2.	"Next Year Finally Came"	Grindele; Jim Lunsford	2:46
3.	"Jesus Is Your Saviour, Child"	Don Feagin	2:30
4.	"He Took My Place"	Ruth Hukill	3:04
5.	"Brush Arbor Meeting"	Kenny Munds	3:24

=== Digital version ===
Sunday Morning with Charley Pride
No.	Title	Writer(s)	Length
1.	"I Don't Deserve a Mansion"	Schweers; Simms	2:10
2.	"Be Grateful"	Hosea	2:20
3.	"He's the Man"	Place	3:36
4.	"In Jesus' Name I Pray"	Gibbons; Grindele; Hatch	2:39
5.	"Without Mama Here"	Lane	3:00
6.	"Little Delta Church"	Knight	3:32
7.	"Next Year Finally Came"	Grindele; Lunsford	2:50
8.	"Jesus Is Your Saviour, Child"	Feagin	2:33
9.	"He Took My Place"	Hukill	3:08
10.	"Brush Arbor Meeting"	Munds	3:24

== Personnel ==
All credits are adapted from the liner notes of Sunday Morning with Charley Pride.

Musical personnel

- David Briggs – organ, piano
- Jimmy Capps – guitar
- Johnny Gimble – fiddle
- Lloyd Green – steel guitar
- Buddy Harman – drums
- The Jordanaires – background vocals
- The Nashville Edition – background vocals
- Charley Pride – lead vocals
- Hal Rugg – steel guitar
- Dale Seller – guitar
- Jerry Shook – guitar
- Tommy Williams – fiddle
- Chip Young – guitar
- Joe Zinkan – bass

Technical personnel

- Jerry Bradley – producer
- Herb Burnette – art direction
- Ray Butts – recording technician
- Dennis Carney – artwork, photography
- John Donegan – photography
- Bill Harris – engineer
- Tom Pick – engineer
- Roy Shockley – recording technician
- Bill Vandevort – recording technician

== Chart performance ==
Chart (1976)	Peak position
US Top Country Albums (Billboard)	14

== Release history ==
Region	Date	Format	Label	Ref.
Australia	April 1976	Vinyl	RCA Victor Records	
Canada	April 1976	Vinyl	RCA Victor Records	
United Kingdom	April 1976	Vinyl	RCA Victor Records	
United States	April 1976	Vinyl	RCA Victor Records	
United States	2010s	Sony Music Entertainment	Digital; streaming	
