= Lead Me On (Conway Twitty and Loretta Lynn album) =

Studio album by Conway Twitty and Loretta Lynn
- Released: January 17, 1972
- Recorded: November 11, 1970–November 23, 1971
- Studios: Bradley's Barn, Mount Juliet, Tennessee
- Genre: Country
- Length: 27:31
- Label: Decca
- Producer: Owen Bradley

Conway Twitty and Loretta Lynn chronology
We Only Make Believe (1971)	Lead Me On (1972)	Louisiana Woman, Mississippi Man (1973)

Conway Twitty chronology
I Wonder What She'll Think About Me Leaving (1971)	We Only Make Believe (1972)	Conway Twitty Sings the Blues (1972)

Loretta Lynn chronology
You're Lookin' at Country (1971)	Lead Me On (1972)	One's on the Way (1972)

Singles from Lead Me On
- 1. "Lead Me On" Released: September 6, 1971

Lead Me On is the second collaborative studio album by Conway Twitty and Loretta Lynn. It was released on January 17, 1972, by Decca Records.

== Critical reception ==
Professional ratings
Review scores
Source	Rating
AllMusic	2/5 stars

In the issue dated February 5, 1972, Billboard magazine published a review of the album, saying that "For their second package of duets, Twitty and Loretta Lynn come up with another dynamite selection of material certain to prove another hot chart item. Their hit single, "Lead Me On", is spotlighted and featured are standouts such as "Never Ending Song of Love", "Easy Loving", and the clever rhythm item, "You Blow My Mind", penned by Billy Edd Wheeler.

Cashbox published a review in the January 29, 1972 issue, which said, "Visually, Loretta Lynn and Conway Twitty are a stately and dignified couple. Their finely-cut features are emphasized by their subtle but modern and tasty choice of clothes. Although they look different and usually wear different color and style outfits, they are always coordinated – they are two different halves that combine as a whole which is more than either half. And so it is with their music; their finely-cut voices are adorned by subtle but modern arrangements and instrumentation. They both have different styles that merge into a new style that is both of them and something more. Listen to "Lead Me On", "You Blow My Mind", and "You're the Reason"."

The review published in the January 29, 1972 issue of Record World praised the music but criticized the album's artwork, saying it is a "Great bunch of tunes, but they sure ruined the cover photos with the blue border and the 100 white stars. The graphic people surely can't put a damper on the album's contents. The hot country duo hit hard with tunes like "Lead Me On", "Back Street Affair", and absolutely the most sexy version of "Easy Lovin'" ever recorded. A natural pick."

== Commercial performance ==
The album peaked at No. 2 on the US Billboard Hot Country LP's chart and No. 106 on the US Billboard Top LP's chart. The album was certified Gold by the RIAA for sales of more than 500,000 copies.

The album's only single, "Lead Me On", was released in September 1971 and peaked at No. 1 on the US Billboard Hot Country Singles chart, becoming the duo's second song to top the chart. In Canada, the single peaked at No. 1 on the RPM Country Singles chart.

== Recording ==
Recording sessions for the album took place at Bradley's Barn in Mount Juliet, Tennessee, on November 21–23, 1971. "Lead Me On" was recorded on November 11, 1970, during the sessions for 1971's We Only Make Believe.

== Track listing ==
Side one
No.	Title	Writer(s)	Recording date	Length
1.	"Lead Me On"	Leon Copeland	November 11, 1970	2:24
2.	"When I Turn Off My Lights (Your Memory Turns On)"	Tommy Markham; L.E. White	November 22, 1971	2:14
3.	"Never Ending Song of Love"	Delaney Bramlett	November 21, 1971	2:20
4.	"Playing House Away from Home"	Bill Rhodes	November 22, 1971	2:34
5.	"You're the Reason"	Bobby Edwards; Terry Fell; Fred Henley	November 22, 1971	2:47
6.	"How Far Can We Go?"	Bobby Hicks; Kenny Starr	November 22, 1971	2:15

Side two
No.	Title	Writer(s)	Recording date	Length
1.	"You Blow My Mind"	Billy Ed Wheeler	November 23, 1971	2:35
2.	"Easy Loving"	Freddie Hart	November 21, 1971	2:40
3.	"Back Street Affair"	Jimmy Rule; Billy Wallace	November 21, 1971	3:05
4.	"I Wonder If You Told Her About Me"	Conway Twitty	November 23, 1971	2:30
5.	"Get Some Loving Done"	Jimmy Peppers	November 23, 1971	2:07

== Personnel ==
Adapted from the album liner notes and Decca recording session records.

- Harold Bradley – bass guitar
- Owen Bradley – producer
- Ray Edenton – acoustic guitar
- John Hughey – steel guitar
- Darrell Johnson - mastering
- The Jordanaires – background vocals
- Loretta Lynn – lead vocals
- Tommy Markham – drums
- Bob Moore – bass
- Hargus Robbins – piano
- Jerry Smith – piano
- Conway Twitty – lead vocals
- Herman Wade – electric guitar

== Charts ==
Album

Chart (1972)	Peak position
US Hot Country LP's (Billboard)	2
US Top LP's (Billboard)	106

Singles

Title	Year	Peak position	
Title	Year	US Country	CAN Country
"Lead Me On"	1972	1	1
