= Did You Think to Pray (song) =

Single by Charley Pride

from the album Did You Think to Pray
- A-side: "Let Me Live"
- Released: April 1971
- Recorded: February 11, 1971
- Studio: RCA Studio A, Nashville, Tennessee
- Genre: Country; gospel
- Length: 3:23
- Label: RCA Victor
- Songwriters: Jack D. Johnson; Charley Pride
- Producer: Jack Clement

Charley Pride singles chronology
"I'd Rather Love You" (1971)	"Did You Think to Pray" (1971)	"I'm Just Me" (1971)

"Did You Think to Pray" Recorded by Charley Pride, the song was produced by Jack Clement and was released as a single via RCA Victor Records in 1971. Many sites credit Charley Pride with writing the song with assistance from Jack D. Johnson, but the lyrics were written by Mary A. Pepper Kidder (1820 - 1905) and the tune by William O. Perkins (1831 - 1903). (https://wordwisehymns.com/2013/08/30/did-you-think-to-pray/) The song became a minor hit on the Billboard country chart. It was later released on album of the same name.

== Background and content ==
Under the supervision and guidance of Jack Clement, Charley Pride became country music's first commercially successful African-American recording artist. By the early 1970s, he had several number one hits and released several studio albums. In 1971, he would release his first album of gospel music, which would include the song, "Did You Think to Pray." The song was recorded on February 2, 1971 at the RCA Victor Studio. Two additional gospel songs were recorded during the same session. Jack Clement would serve as producer for the song.

== Release and reception ==
"Did You Think to Pray" was released as a single via RCA Victor Records in April 1971. It was Pride's sixteenth single released in his music career. Its B-side, "Let Me Live," became the bigger hit at radio, climbing to number 21 on the country chart in 1971. The A-side spent only one week on the Billboard Hot Country Songs chart and peaked at number 70 on the list in April 1971. It was later released on Pride's 1971 gospel album of the same name.

== Track listings ==
7" vinyl single

- "Do You Think to Pray" – 3:50
- "Let Me Live" – 3:23

== Chart performance ==
Chart (1971)	Peak position
US Hot Country Songs (Billboard)	70
