= I'm Just Me (album) =

Studio album by Charley Pride
- Released: June 1971
- Studios: RCA, Nashville, Tennessee
- Genre: Country
- Label: RCA Victor
- Producer: Jack Clement

Charley Pride chronology
Did You Think to Pray (1971)	I'm Just Me (1971)	Charley Pride Sings Heart Songs (1971)

Singles from I'm Just Me
- 1. "I'd Rather Love You" Released: January 1971; 2. "I'm Just Me" Released: June 1971

I'm Just Me is the twelfth studio album by American country music artist Charley Pride, released in 1971 by RCA Victor.

The album was awarded three stars from the web site AllMusic. It debuted on Billboard's country album chart on July 17, 1971, peaked at No. 1, and remained on the chart for 38 weeks. The album also included two No. 1 hit singles: "I'd Rather Love You" and "I'm Just Me".

== Track listing ==
No.	Title	Writer(s)	Length
1.	"On the Southbound"	Allen Reynolds, Dickey Lee	2:30
2.	"(In My World) You Don't Belong"	Johnny Duncan	2:20
3.	"You Never Gave Up on Me"	Reynolds	3:04
4.	"I'd Rather Love You"	Duncan	2:46
5.	"Instant Loneliness"	Duncan	2:58
6.	"I'm Just Me"	Glenn Martin	2:19
7.	"A Place for the Lonesome"	James Bullington	2:50
8.	"Hello Darlin'"	Conway Twitty	2:28
9.	"You're Still the Only One I'll Ever Love"	Bill Anderson	2:35
10.	"That's My Way"	Dave Turner	2:01

== Charts ==
Chart performance for I'm Just Me
Chart (1971)	Peak position
US Billboard 200	50
US Top Country Albums (Billboard)	1

== See also ==
- Charley Pride discography
