= All His Children =

- Japanese release picture sleeve

Single by Charley Pride with Henry Mancini

from the album Sometimes a Great Notion
- B-side: "You'll Still Be the One"
- Released: January 1972
- Recorded: July 19, 1971
- Studio: RCA Studio A, Nashville, Tennessee
- Genre: Country
- Label: RCA
- Songwriters: Alan Bergman; Marilyn Bergman; Henry Mancini
- Producer: Jack Clement

Charley Pride singles chronology
"Kiss an Angel Good Mornin'" (1971)	"All His Children" (1972)	"It's Gonna Take a Little Bit Longer" (1972)

"All His Children" is a song recorded by American country music artist Charley Pride with music by Henry Mancini. It was released in January 1972 and was the theme of the film Sometimes a Great Notion. The song peaked at number 2 on the Billboard Hot Country Singles chart. It also reached number 1 on the RPM Country Tracks chart in Canada.

The song was nominated for the Academy Award for Best Original Song in 1971.

== Chart performance ==
Chart (1972)	Peak position
US Hot Country Songs (Billboard)	2
US Billboard Hot 100	92
Canadian RPM Country Tracks	1

== Other recordings ==
Bing Crosby recorded the song for his 1972 album Bing 'n' Basie.
