= Charley Pride Sings Heart Songs =

Studio album by Charley Pride
- Released: November 1971
- Studios: RCA Studio A (Nashville, Tennessee)
- Genre: Country
- Label: RCA Victor
- Producer: Jack Clement

Charley Pride chronology
I'm Just Me (1971)	Charley Pride Sings Heart Songs (1971)	The Best of Charley Pride, Volume II (1972)

Singles from Charley Pride Sings Heart Songs
- 1. "Kiss an Angel Good Mornin'" Released: October 23, 1971

Charley Pride Sings Heart Songs is the thirteenth studio album by the American country music artist of the same name. It was released in 1971 on the RCA Victor label (catalog no. LSP-4617) and resulted in Pride being awarded the Grammy for “Best Country Vocal Performance, Male” at the 15th Annual Grammy Awards.

The album was awarded four-and-a-half stars from the web site AllMusic. It debuted on Billboard's country album chart on November 27, 1971, spent 16 weeks at the No. 1 spot, and remained on the chart for a total of 36 weeks. The album included the No. 1 hit single "Kiss an Angel Good Mornin'".

== Track listing ==
No.	Title	Writer(s)	Length
1.	"You'll Still Be the One""	Johnny Duncan	2:42
2.	"Anywhere (Just Inside Your Arms)"	Wanda Ballman	2:17
3.	"I'm Beginning to Believe My Own Lies"	Al Urban	2:45
4.	"Kiss an Angel Good Mornin'"	Ben Peters	2:02
5.	"What Money Can't Buy"	Carl Knight, Clayton Ford, Howard White	3:04
6.	"No One Could Ever Take Me from You"	Hal Bynum	2:47
7.	"Jeanie Norman"	Dale Morris	2:38
8.	"Once Again"	Duncan	2:55
9.	"Miracles, Music and My Wife"	Hezzi Kyle, Jim Shanger	2:51
10.	"Pretty House for Sale"	Harold Dorman, Wylie Gann	2:45

== Charts ==
=== Weekly charts ===
Chart (1971–1972)	Peak position
US Billboard 200	38
US Top Country Albums (Billboard)	1

=== Year-end charts ===
Chart (1972)	Position
US Top Country Albums (Billboard)	2

== See also ==
- Charley Pride discography
