= Would You Take Another Chance on Me =

Single by Jerry Lee Lewis

from the album Would You Take Another Chance on Me
- A-side: "Me and Bobby McGee"
- Released: October 1971
- Genre: Country
- Label: Mercury
- Songwriter(s): Jerry Foster; Bill Rice
- Producer(s): Jerry Kennedy

Jerry Lee Lewis singles chronology
"When He Walks on You" (1971)	"Would You Take Another Chance on Me" (1971)	"Chantilly Lace" (1972)

"Would You Take Another Chance on Me" is a 1971 single by Jerry Lee Lewis. "Would You Take Another Chance on Me" was Jerry Lee Lewis' fifth number one on the country chart. The single stayed at number one for a single week and spent a total of sixteen weeks within the top 40.

The flip-side of the single was a cover of "Me and Bobby McGee" that was aimed at the pop market. The song peaked at No. 40 on the Billboard Hot 100. His first top 40 pop hit since 1961's "What'd I Say," "Me and Bobby McGee" was Lewis' last top 40 pop hit to date.

== Chart performance ==
Chart (1971–1972)	Peak position
U.S. Billboard Hot Country Singles	1
Canadian RPM Country Tracks	2
