= Let Me Live (Charley Pride song) =

Single by Charley Pride

from the album Did You Think to Pray
- A-side: "Did You Think to Pray"
- Released: April 1971
- Recorded: February 11, 1971
- Studio: RCA Victor Studio
- Genre: Country; gospel
- Length: 3:23
- Label: RCA Victor
- Songwriter: Ben Peters
- Producer: Jack Clement

Charley Pride singles chronology
"I'd Rather Love You" (1971)	"Let Me Live" (1971)	"I'm Just Me" (1971)

"Let Me Live" is a song written by Ben Peters. It was originally recorded by American country music artist Charley Pride. The song was produced by Jack Clement and was released as a single via RCA Victor Records in 1971. The song became a top 40 hit on the Billboard country chart and in Canada. It was Pride's only gospel recording to become a major hit.

== Background and content ==
Under the supervision and guidance of Jack Clement, Charley Pride became country music's first commercially successful African-American recording artist. By the early 1970s, he had several number-one hits and released several studio albums. In 1971, he released his first album of gospel music, which included the song, "Let Me Live". The song was composed by Ben Peters. The song was recorded on February 2, 1971, at the RCA Victor Studio. Two additional gospel songs were recorded during the same session. Jack Clement served as producer for the song.

== Release and reception ==
"Let Me Live" was released as a single via RCA Victor Records in April 1971. It was Pride's 16th single released in his music career. "Let Me Live" was actually the B-side on the single release. "Did You Think to Pray" was the original A-side, but was not played as heavily at radio. It spent a total of nine weeks on the Billboard Hot Country Songs chart and peaked at number 21 on the list in May 1971. The song was Pride's first gospel recording (and only to date) to become a hit on country radio. It was also his first single to miss the country top 10 since 1967. It also became a hit in Canada, also reaching number 37 on the RPM Country Singles chart in 1968. It was later released on Pride's 1971 gospel album, Did You Think to Pray.

== Track listings ==
7" vinyl single

- "Did You Think to Pray" – 3:50
- "Let Me Live" – 3:23

== Charts ==
Chart (1971)	Peak position
Canada Country Songs (RPM)	37
US Bubbling Under Hot 100 Singles (Billboard)	4
US Hot Country Songs (Billboard)	21
