= When He Walks on You =

Single by Jerry Lee Lewis

from the album Touching Home
- B-side: "Foolish Kind of Man"
- Released: June 1971
- Genre: Country
- Label: Mercury
- Songwriter(s): Dallas Frazier; A. L. Owens

Jerry Lee Lewis singles chronology
"Love on Broadway" (1971)	"When He Walks on You" (1971)	"Would You Take Another Chance on Me" (1971)

"When He Walks on You (Like You Have Walked on Me)" is a single by American country music artist Jerry Lee Lewis. Released in June 1971, it was the second single from his album Touching Home. The song peaked at number 11 on the Billboard Hot Country Singles chart. It also reached number 1 on the RPM Country Tracks chart in Canada.

== Chart performance ==
Chart (1971)	Peak position
U.S. Billboard Hot Country Singles	11
Canadian RPM Country Tracks	1
