= Did You Think to Pray =

Studio album by Charley Pride
- Released: April 1971
- Studio: RCA Victor, Nashville, Tennessee
- Genre: Gospel
- Length: 28:50
- Label: RCA Victor
- Producer: Jack Clement

Charley Pride chronology
From Me to You (1971)	Did You Think to Pray (1971)	I'm Just Me (1971)

Singles from Did You Think to Pray
- 1. "Did You Think to Pray" Released: April 1971

Did You Think to Pray is an album of gospel songs by country music artist Charley Pride. The song from which this album takes its name was originally released in 1971 on the RCA Victor label (catalog no. LSP-4513). Many sites credit Charley Pride with writing the song with assistance from Jack D. Johnson, but the lyrics were written by Mary A. Pepper Kidder (1820 - 1905) and the tune by William O. Perkins (1831 - 1903).

The album was awarded four-and-a-half stars from the web site AllMusic. It debuted on Billboard's country album chart on April 24, 1971, peaked at No. 1, and remained on the chart for 33 weeks.

== Track listing ==
Side A

1. "Did You Think to Pray" (adapted by Charley Pride, Jack D. Johnson) [3:40]
2. "I'll Fly Away" (Albert Brumley) [2:27]
3. "Time Out for Jesus" (Ann J. Morton) [2:28]
4. "Angel Band" (adapted by Charley Pride, Jack D. Johnson), accompanied by The Jordanaires [2:33]
5. "Jesus, Don't Give Up on Me" (Alex Zanetis, Jack Clement) [2:53]

Side B

1. "Let Me Live" (Ben Peters) [3:21]
2. "Whispering Hope" (adapted by Charley Pride, Jack D. Johnson) [3:10]
3. "This Highway Leads to Glory (Lassaye Holmes), accompanied by The Jordanaires [2:56]
4. "The Church in the Wildwood" (adapted by Charley Pride, Jack D. Johnson) [2:45]
5. "Lord, Build Me a Cabin in Glory" (Curtis Stewart) [2:37]

== Charts ==
Chart performance for Did You Think to Pray
Chart (1971)	Peak position
US Billboard 200	76
US Top Country Albums (Billboard)	1

== See also ==
- Charley Pride discography
