= A Woman Always Knows =

Single by David Houston

from the album A Woman Always Knows
- B-side: "The Rest of My Life"
- Released: December 1970
- Genre: Country
- Label: Epic
- Songwriter(s): Billy Sherrill

David Houston singles chronology
"After Closing Time" (1970)	"A Woman Always Knows" (1970)	"Nashville" (1971)

"A Woman Always Knows" is a song written by Billy Sherrill, and recorded by American country music artist David Houston. It was released in December 1970 as the second single and title track from his album A Woman Always Knows. The song peaked at number 2 on the Billboard Hot Country Singles chart. It also reached number 1 on the RPM Country Tracks chart in Canada.

== Chart performance ==
Chart (1970–1971)	Peak position
U.S. Billboard Hot Country Singles	2
Canadian RPM Country Tracks	1
