= Countryfied =

Single by Dick Damron

from the album Countryfied
- Released: 1970
- Genre: Country
- Label: Apex
- Songwriter(s): Dick Damron

Dick Damron singles chronology
"Hitch Hikin'" (1964)	"Countryfied" (1970)	"Rise 'n' Shine" (1971)

"Countryfied"

Single by George Hamilton IV

from the album North Country
- B-side: "My North Country Home"
- Released: April 1971
- Genre: Country
- Label: RCA
- Songwriter(s): Dick Damron

George Hamilton IV singles chronology
"Anyway" (1971)	"Countryfied" (1971)	"West Texas Highway" (1971)

"Countryfied" is a song written by Canadian country music artist Dick Damron. The song debuted at number 43 on the RPM Country Tracks chart on July 18, 1970. It peaked at number 1 on September 26, 1970.

"Countryfied" was covered by American country music artist George Hamilton IV on his 1971 album North Country. Hamilton's version was released as the album's first single in April 1971. It peaked at number 35 on the Billboard Hot Country Singles chart. It also reached number 1 on the RPM Country Tracks chart in Canada.

== Chart performance ==
=== Dick Damron ===
Chart (1970)	Peak position
Canadian RPM Country Tracks	1

=== George Hamilton IV ===
Chart (1971)	Peak position
U.S. Billboard Hot Country Singles	35
Canadian RPM Country Tracks	1
