= Old Bill Jones =

Single by Mercey Brothers
- Released: 1970
- Genre: Country
- Label: Columbia
- Songwriter: Lew Sully,

Mercey Brothers singles chronology
"Pickin' Up the Pieces" (1970)	"Old Bill Jones" (1970)	"Knocking Down the Hard Times" (1971)

"Old Bill Jones" is a ragtime popular song published in 1897 with words and music credited to Lew Sully, published by Howley Haveland & Co., New York. The song has similarities to older folk songs such as Old Dan Tucker.

Arthur Collins recorded it on phonograph cylinder in 1898 and on gramophone record in 1900 and again for Victor Records in 1903.

The song became part of the old time country music repertory.

"Old Bill Jones" is a single by Canadian country music group Mercey Brothers. The song peaked at number 1 on the RPM Country Tracks chart on January 9, 1971. It also reached number 18 on the RPM Adult Contemporary chart.

== Chart performance ==
Chart (1970–1971)	Peak position
Canadian RPM Country Tracks	1
Canadian RPM Adult Contemporary	18
