= Anyway (George Hamilton IV song) =

Single by George Hamilton IV

from the album Back Where It's At
- B-side: "Best I Can Do"
- Released: January 1971
- Genre: Country
- Label: RCA

George Hamilton IV singles chronology
"Back Where It's At" (1970)	"Anyway" (1971)	"Countryfied" (1971)

"Anyway" is a single by American country music artist George Hamilton IV. Released in January 1971, it was the fourth single from his album Back Where It's At. The song peaked at number 13 on the Billboard Hot Country Singles chart. It also reached number 1 on the RPM Country Tracks chart in Canada.

== Chart performance ==
Chart (1971)	Peak position
US Billboard Hot Country Singles	13
Canadian RPM Country Tracks	1
