= Rise 'n' Shine =

Single by Dick Damron
- Released: 1971
- Genre: Country
- Label: MCA
- Songwriter(s): Dick Damron

Dick Damron singles chronology
"Countryfied" (1970)	"Rise 'n' Shine" (1971)	"The Long Green Line" (1972)

"Rise 'n' Shine" is a single by Canadian country music artist Dick Damron. The song debuted at number 41 on the RPM Country Tracks chart on April 24, 1971. It peaked at number 1 on July 17, 1971.

== Chart performance ==
Chart (1971)	Peak position
Canadian RPM Country Tracks	1
