= After the Fire Is Gone =

- Singapore release picture sleeve

Single by Conway Twitty and Loretta Lynn

from the album We Only Make Believe
- B-side: "One I Can't Live Without"
- Released: January 4, 1971
- Genre: Country
- Label: Decca
- Songwriter: L. E. White
- Producer: Owen Bradley

Conway Twitty and Loretta Lynn singles chronology
"After the Fire Is Gone" (1971)	"Lead Me On" (1971)

"After the Fire Is Gone" is a song written by L. E. White, and recorded by American country music artists Loretta Lynn and Conway Twitty as a duet. It was released in January 1971 as the only single from the LP We Only Make Believe. "After the Fire Is Gone" was the first number one on the U.S. country chart for Lynn and Twitty as a duo. It spent two weeks at number one and a total of 14 weeks on the chart. On the Billboard Hot 100, the single peaked at number 56. It also won the Grammy Award for Best Country Performance by a Duo or Group with Vocal.

In 1974, Willie Nelson and Tracy Nelson released a cover version which reached No. 17 on the Billboard country singles chart. Ricky Lynn Gregg released a version in 1994 from his album Get a Little Closer, but his version did not chart. On Willie's album To All the Girls... he sang the song with Leon Russell's daughter Tina Rose.

The song was recorded by Tanya Tucker on her 2010 album My Turn. A duet version was recorded by Allison Moorer and Steve Earle on the 2010 tribute album to Loretta, Coal Miner's Daughter.

== Chart performance ==
=== Conway Twitty and Loretta Lynn ===
Chart (1971)	Peak position
U.S. Billboard Hot Country Singles	1
U.S. Billboard Hot 100	56
Canadian RPM Country Tracks	4

=== Willie Nelson and Tracy Nelson ===
Chart (1974)	Peak position
U.S. Billboard Hot Country Singles	17
