= You're My Man (song) =

Single by Lynn Anderson

from the album You're My Man
- B-side: "I'm Gonna Write a Song"
- Released: April 1971
- Recorded: 1971
- Genre: Countrypolitan
- Length: 2:40
- Label: Columbia
- Songwriter: Glenn Sutton
- Producer: Glenn Sutton

Lynn Anderson singles chronology
"Rose Garden" (1970)	"You're My Man" (1971)	"How Can I Unlove You" (1971)

"You're My Man" is a song written by Glenn Sutton. The song was a popular No. 1 country hit by country artist Lynn Anderson from 1971.

== Background ==
"You're My Man" is mainly about the narrator describing her affection for her lover, saying there is no one else in the world for her, and she wants "the whole world to know". The song's orchestral arrangements and pop-influenced sound made it a Countrypolitan recording.

== Chart performance ==
This song was immediately released after Anderson's song "(I Never Promised You a) Rose Garden" became a major country and pop hit in February 1971. The song was very successful, reaching the top of the country charts in June 1971, and staying for two weeks. It was Anderson's second No. 1 country hit. "You're My Man" was one of 11 singles Anderson would place at the No. 1 position. The song also reached No. 1 on the Cashbox Country Charts. "You're My Man" was a major Adult Contemporary hit, placing at No. 6.

Chart (1971)	Peak position
U.S. Billboard Hot 100	63
U.S. Billboard Hot Country Singles	1
U.S. Billboard Easy Listening	6
Canadian RPM Top Singles	75
Canadian RPM Country Tracks	1
Canadian RPM Adult Contemporary	7

== Cover versions ==
Ashley Potter covered it and reached No. 43 in the UK Indie Charts.
