= Lead Me On (Conway Twitty and Loretta Lynn song) =

Single by Conway Twitty and Loretta Lynn

from the album Lead Me On
- B-side: "Four Glass Walls"
- Released: September 6, 1971
- Genre: Country
- Label: Decca
- Songwriter: Leon Copeland
- Producer: Owen Bradley

Conway Twitty and Loretta Lynn singles chronology
"After the Fire Is Gone" (1971)	"Lead Me On" (1971)	"Louisiana Woman, Mississippi Man" (1973)

"Lead Me On" is a song written by Leon Copeland, and recorded by American country music artists Conway Twitty and Loretta Lynn as a duet. It was released in September 1971 as the first single and title track from the album Lead Me On. The song was the second number one on the U.S. country singles chart for the pair as a duo. The single stayed at number one for a single week and spent a total of 15 weeks on the chart.

== Chart performance ==
Chart (1971)	Peak position
U.S. Billboard Hot Country Singles	1
Canadian RPM Country Tracks	1
