= Empty Arms =

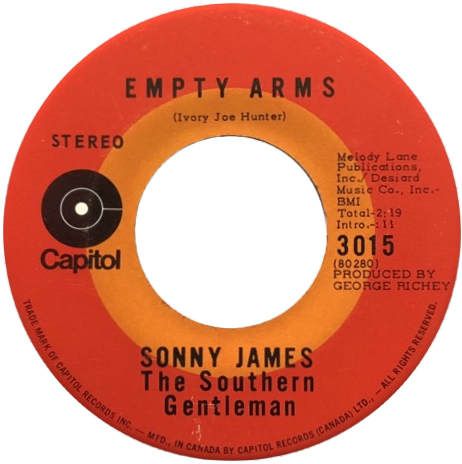
- 1971 Canadian vinyl record

Single by Sonny James

from the album Empty Arms
- B-side: "Everything Begins and Ends with You"
- Released: January 1971
- Genre: Country
- Label: Capitol
- Songwriter: Ivory Joe Hunter

Sonny James singles chronology
"Endlessly" (1970)	"Empty Arms" (1971)	"Bright Lights, Big City" (1971)

"Empty Arms" is a song composed and first recorded by Ivory Joe Hunter which became an R&B hit in 1957. This original version peaked at #2 on the US, R&B Airplay chart and at #43 on the pop chart.

== Cover Versions ==
- A cover version by Teresa Brewer became a hit the same month as the original recording.
- The song was successfully revived with a 1971 single by Sonny James. "Empty Arms" was Sonny James' eighteenth number one on the country charts. The single stayed at number one for four weeks and spent a total of fifteen weeks on the chart.

== Chart performance ==
=== Sonny James ===
Chart (1971)	Peak position
U.S. Billboard Hot Country Singles	1
U.S. Billboard Hot 100	93
Canadian RPM Country Tracks	1
