= How Much More Can She Stand =

Single by Conway Twitty

from the album How Much More Can She Stand
- B-side: "Just Like Stranger"
- Released: March 1971
- Recorded: February 2, 1971
- Studio: Bradley's Barn, Mount Juliet, Tennessee
- Genre: Country
- Length: 2:56
- Label: Decca
- Songwriter(s): Harry Compton
- Producer(s): Owen Bradley

Conway Twitty singles chronology
"What Am I Living For" (1970)	"How Much More Can She Stand" (1971)	"I Wonder What She'll Think About Me Leaving" (1971)

"How Much More Can She Stand" is a song written by Harry Compton, and recorded by American country music artist Conway Twitty. It was released in March 1971 as the first single and title track from the album How Much More Can She Stand. The song was Twitty's sixth number one solo country hit. The single stayed at number one for a single week and spent a total of 15 weeks on the country chart.

== Personnel ==
- Conway Twitty — lead vocals
- Joe E. Lewis, The Jordanaires — background vocals
- Harold Bradley — electric 6-string bass guitar
- Grady Martin — electric guitar
- Larry Butler — piano
- Jimmy Capps — acoustic guitar
- John Hughey — steel guitar
- Tommy Markham — drums and percussion
- Bob Moore — bass
- Herman Wade — electric guitar

== Chart performance ==
Chart (1971)	Peak position
US Hot Country Songs (Billboard)	1
US Bubbling Under Hot 100 Singles (Billboard)	5
Canadian RPM Country Tracks	1
