= I'd Rather Love You =

Single by Charley Pride

from the album I'm Just Me
- B-side: "(In My World) You Don't Belong"
- Released: January 1971
- Genre: Country
- Length: 2:46
- Label: RCA Victor
- Songwriter(s): Johnny Duncan
- Producer(s): Jack Clement

Charley Pride singles chronology
"I Can't Believe That You've Stopped Loving Me" (1970)	"I'd Rather Love You" (1971)	"Did You Think to Pray/Let Me Live" (1971)

"I'd Rather Love You" is a song written by Johnny Duncan, and recorded by American country music artist Charley Pride. It was released in January 1971 as the first single from the album I'm Just Me. The song was Pride's sixth song to top the U.S. country singles chart. The single stayed at number one for three weeks, spending a total of 13 weeks on the chart.

== Chart performance ==
Chart (1971)	Peak position
US Hot Country Songs (Billboard)	1
US Billboard Hot 100	79
Canadian RPM Country Tracks	1
