= I'm Just Me =

Single by Charley Pride

from the album I'm Just Me
- B-side: "Place for the Lonesome"
- Released: June 1971
- Genre: Country
- Length: 2:21
- Label: RCA Victor
- Songwriter(s): Glenn Martin
- Producer(s): Jack Clement

Charley Pride singles chronology
"Did You Think to Pray/Let Me Live" (1971)	"I'm Just Me" (1971)	"Kiss an Angel Good Mornin'" (1971)

"I'm Just Me" is a song written by Glenn Martin, and recorded by American country music artist Charley Pride. It was released in June 1971 as the second single and title track from the album I'm Just Me. The song was Pride's seventh number one on the U.S. country singles chart. The single stayed at number one for four weeks and spent fourteen weeks on the chart.

== Chart performance ==
Chart (1971)	Peak position
US Hot Country Songs (Billboard)	1
US Billboard Hot 100	94
Canadian RPM Country Tracks	1
