= Kiss an Angel Good Mornin' =

Single by Charley Pride

from the album Charley Pride Sings Heart Songs
- B-side: "No One Could Ever Take Me from You"
- Released: October 23, 1971
- Studio: RCA Studio B, Nashville
- Genre: Country
- Length: 2:02
- Label: RCA Victor
- Songwriter: Ben Peters
- Producer: Jack Clement

Charley Pride singles chronology
"I'm Just Me" (1971)	"Kiss an Angel Good Mornin'" (1971)	"Let Me Live" (1971)

"Kiss an Angel Good Mornin'" is a song written by Ben Peters, and recorded by American country music artist Charley Pride. It was released in October 1971 by RCA Victor as the first single from his 13th studio album, Charley Pride Sings Heart Songs (1971). It has since become one of his signature tunes and was his eighth song to reach number 1 on the country charts. It was also Pride's only single to reach the top 40 on the pop charts, peaking at number 21 on the US Billboard Hot 100, and also went into the Top Ten of the Adult Contemporary charts. It also reached number 19 on the US Cash Box Top 100. The song spent four months on the pop chart, longer than any of his other hits. Billboard ranked it as the number 74 song for 1972.

Though missing the top 40 nationally, "Kiss an Angel Good Mornin'" reached the top 10 in Sydney, Australia, on 2NUR, peaking at number 7. In 2025, the song was selected for preservation by the Library of Congress for being "Historically, culturally, or aesthetically significant".

== Content ==
A man and a woman are happily married, and his friends ask the secret to their love. He says that he gets to "kiss an angel good mornin'", referring to his wife, and to "love her like a devil," referring to himself.

== Charts ==
Chart (1971–1972)	Peak position
Australia (Kent Music Report)	58
Canada Top Singles (RPM)	31
Canada Adult Contemporary Tracks (RPM)	2
Canada Country Tracks (RPM)	1
US Billboard Hot 100	21
US Adult Contemporary (Billboard)	7
US Hot Country Songs (Billboard)	1
US Cash Box Top 100	19

== Cover versions ==
George Jones - on his 1972 album George Jones (We Can Make It).

Conway Twitty - in 1972, on his album I Can't See Me Without You.

Gene Stuart recorded a version in Ireland in 1972.

Roy Clark - on his album entitled Roy Clark Country! released in 1972.

Percy Sledge - on his 1979 album Sings Country.

Alan Jackson - on his 1999 album Under the Influence.

Heather Myles - on her 1998 album Highways and Honky Tonks.
