= Charley Pride =

American country musician (1934–2020)

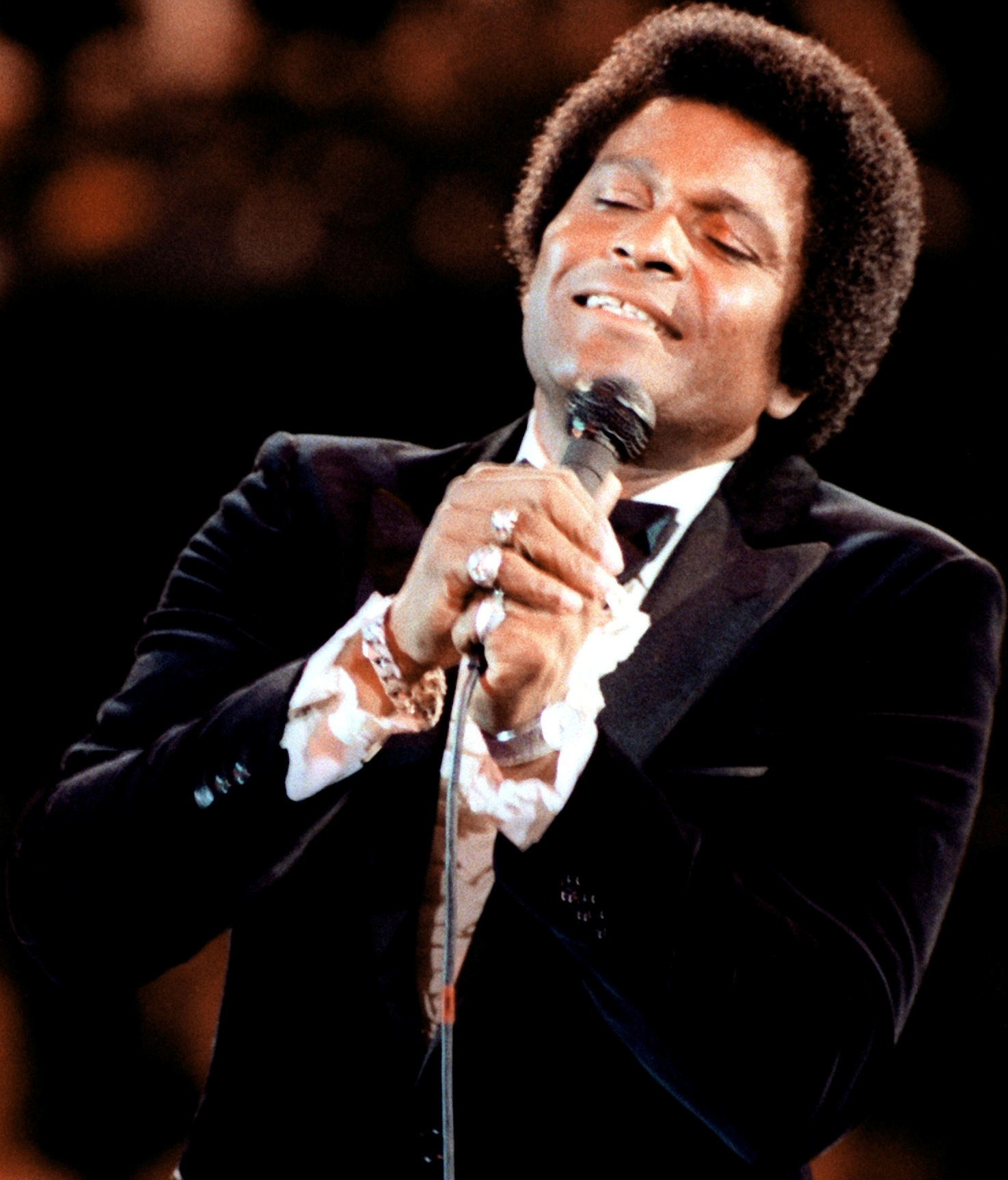
- Pride performing at Capital Centre on Inauguration Day, January 1981

Background information
- Born: Charley Frank Pride; March 18, 1934; Sledge, Mississippi, U.S.
- Died: December 12, 2020 (aged 86) Dallas, Texas, U.S.
- Genre: Country
- Occupations: Singer; musician; baseball player
- Instruments: Vocals; guitar
- Years active: 1948–2020
- Labels: RCA Records; 16th Avenue; Music City
- Website: charleypride.com
- Baseball career
- Pitcher
- Batted: Switch Threw: Right

Negro leagues debut
- 1953, for the Memphis Red Sox

Last Negro leagues appearance
- 1958, for the Memphis Red Sox

Teams
- Negro leagues; • Memphis Red Sox (1953, 1954–1957, 1958); • Birmingham Black Barons (1954); Minor leagues; • Boise Yankees (1953); • Fond du Lac Panthers (1953); • Missoula Timberjacks (1960); • East Helena Smelterites (1960)

Career highlights and awards
- • 2× Negro league All-Star (1956–1957); • All Army Championship (1957)

Charley Frank Pride (March 18, 1934 – December 12, 2020) was an American country singer and professional baseball player. Beginning his career as a Negro league baseball player in the early-1950s, he later pursued a career in country music.

The period of his greatest musical success was from around 1969 to 1975, when he was the top-selling artist on RCA Records, outselling even Elvis Presley and John Denver. During the peak years of his recording career (1966–1987), he had 52 top-10 hits on the Billboard Hot Country Songs chart, 30 of which made it to number one. Songs such as "All I Have to Offer You (Is Me)", "Is Anybody Goin' to San Antone", and "Kiss an Angel Good Mornin'", among others, typified the "countrypolitan" style that made him famous and became crossover-pop hits.

Pride later ventured into gospel music, releasing his first gospel album Did You Think to Pray in 1971. In 1973, he performed "The River Song" from the motion picture musical Tom Sawyer.

Pride won the Entertainer of the Year award at the Country Music Association Awards in 1971 and was awarded a Grammy for Best Country Vocal Performance, Male, in 1972. He is also a member of the Grand Ole Opry. He was inducted into the Country Music Hall of Fame in 2000.

== Early life ==
Pride was born on March 18, 1934, in Sledge, Mississippi, to Tessie B. (née Stewart; 1908–1956) and Fowler MacArthur "Mack" Pride Sr. (1907–1996). He was the fourth of eleven children born into a family of sharecroppers. His father intended to name him Charl Frank Pride, but owing to a clerical error on his birth certificate, his legal name was Charley Frank Pride. Eight boys and three girls were in the family. His elder brother, Mack Pride, played Negro league baseball before entering the ministry.

== Career ==
=== Baseball and military service ===
When Pride was 14, his mother purchased him his first guitar and he taught himself to play. Though he loved music, one of Pride's lifelong dreams was to become a professional baseball player. In 1952, he pitched for the Memphis Red Sox of the Negro American League. In 1953, he signed a contract with the Boise Yankees, the Class C farm team of the New York Yankees. During that season, an injury caused him to lose the "mustard" on his fastball, and he was sent to the Yankees' Class D team in Fond du Lac, Wisconsin. Later that season, while in the Negro leagues with the Louisville Clippers, two players – Pride and Jesse Mitchell – were traded to the Birmingham Black Barons for a team bus. "Jesse and I may have the distinction of being the only players in history to be traded for a used motor vehicle," Pride mused in his 1994 autobiography.

Pride pitched for several other minor league teams, his hopes of making it to the big leagues still alive, but he was drafted into the U.S. Army in 1956. After basic training, he was stationed at Fort Carson, Colorado, where he was a quartermaster and played on the Fort's baseball team. That team won the All Army Sports Championship. When discharged in 1958, he rejoined the Memphis Red Sox. He tried to return to baseball, although he was hindered by an injury to his throwing arm.

Pride played three games for the Missoula Timberjacks of the Pioneer League (a farm club of the Cincinnati Reds) in 1960, and had tryouts with the California Angels (1961) and the New York Mets (1962) organizations, but was not picked up by either team.

When he was laid off by the Timberjacks, he moved to work construction in Helena, Montana, in 1960. He was recruited to pitch for the local semipro baseball team, the East Helena Smelterites, and the team manager helped him get a job with the local Asarco lead smelter. The lead smelter kept 18 jobs open specifically for baseball players, and arranged their shifts so they could play as a team. Pride batted .444 his first year.

Pride's singing ability soon came to the attention of the team manager, who also paid him to sing for 15 minutes before each game, which increased attendance and earned Pride another $10 on top of the $10 he earned for each game. He also played gigs in the local area, both solo and with a band called the Night Hawks, and Asarco asked him to sing at company picnics. His job at the smelter was dangerous and difficult; he once broke his ankle. He routinely unloaded coal from railroad cars, shoveling it into a 2,400 °F (1,300 °C) furnace while keeping clear of slag, a task that frequently gave him burns. In a 2014 interview, Pride explained, "I would work at the smelter, work the swing shift and then play music," said Pride. "I'd work 11–7. Drive. Play Friday. Punch in. Drive. Polson. Philipsburg."

Between his smelter job and his music, he made a good living in the Helena area. He moved his wife and son to join him and they lived in Helena until 1967, purchasing their first home there, and with their children Dion and Angela being born at the local hospital. The Pride family moved to Great Falls, Montana, in 1967, because Pride's music career was taking off and he required quicker access to an airport. The family ultimately left Montana and moved to Texas in 1969. In a 1967 interview with the Helena Independent Record, his wife Rozene Pride commented that the family encountered minor racism in Montana, citing an incident where they were refused service in a restaurant and another time when a realtor refused to show them a home, but she felt that the family endured less racism than she saw leveled against local Native American people, whose treatment she compared to that given to Black people in the South. Pride generally spoke fondly of the near-decade he spent there. "Montana is a very conservative state ... I stood out like a neon. But once they let you in, you become a Montanan. When the rumor was that I was leaving. They kept saying, 'we will let you in, you can't leave.'"

On June 5, 2008, Pride and his brother Mack "The Knife" Pride and 28 other living former Negro league players were "drafted" by each of the 30 Major League Baseball teams in a recognition of the on-field achievements and historical relevance of 30 mostly-forgotten Negro league stars. Pride was picked by the Texas Rangers, with which he had a long affiliation, and the Colorado Rockies took his brother Mack.

=== Rise to fame ===
While he was active in baseball, Pride had been encouraged to join the music business by country stars such as Red Sovine and Red Foley, and was working towards this career. In 1958, in Memphis, Pride visited Sun Studio and recorded some songs.

He performed his music solo at clubs and with a four-piece combo called the Night Hawks during the time he lived in Montana. His break came when Jack Clement produced a demo for Pride, and played it for RCA Records executive Chet Atkins, the longtime producer at RCA who had made stars out of country singers such as Jim Reeves, Skeeter Davis, and others, who offered Pride a recording contract in 1965. Nashville manager and agent Jack D. Johnson signed Pride. In 1966, Pride released his first RCA single, "The Snakes Crawl at Night", but the song did not chart. On the records of this song submitted to radio stations for airplay, the singer was listed as "Country Charley Pride". Pride disputed that the omission of a photo was deliberate; he stated that getting promoters to bring in a Black country singer was a bigger problem: "People didn't care if I was pink. RCA signed me ... they knew I was colored ... They decided to put the record out and let it speak for itself." While living in Montana, he continued to sing at local clubs, and in Great Falls had an additional boost to his career when he befriended local businessman Louis Allen "Al" Donohue, who owned radio stations, including KMON, the first stations to play Pride's records in Montana.

Soon after the release of "The Snakes Crawl at Night", Pride released another single called "Before I Met You", which also did not chart. Not long afterwards, his third single, "Just Between You and Me", was released. This song finally brought Pride success on the country charts. The song reached number nine on Hot Country Songs on February 25, 1967.

According to a news item by the Associated Press, Pride made this comment in a 1992 interview: "They used to ask me how it feels to be the 'first colored country singer' ... Then it was 'first Negro country singer;' then 'first Black country singer.' Now I'm the 'first African-American country singer.' That's about the only thing that's changed".

=== Career peak ===
"Pride's amazing baritone – it hints at twang and melisma simultaneously, and to call it warm is to slight the brightness of its heat"

— Christgau's Record Guide: Rock Albums of the Seventies (1981)

The success of "Just Between You and Me" was enormous. Pride was nominated for a Grammy Award for the song the next year. In the late summer of 1966, on the strength of his early releases, he was booked for his first large show, in Detroit's Olympia Stadium. Since no biographical information had been included with those singles, few of the 10,000 country fans who came to the show knew Pride was Black and discovered the fact only when he walked onto the stage, at which point the applause trickled off to silence. "I knew I'd have to get it over with sooner or later," Pride later remembered. "I told the audience: 'Friends, I realize it's a little unique, me coming out here – with a permanent suntan – to sing country and western to you. But that's the way it is.' "

The show marked the beginning of a long and active career playing to large audiences, his race soon becoming a minor detail compared to his success. In 1967, he became the first Black performer to appear at the Grand Ole Opry since founding member DeFord Bailey, who had last appeared in 1941. Between 1969 and 1971, Pride had eight singles that reached number one on the US Country Hit Parade and also charted on the Billboard Hot 100: "All I Have to Offer You (Is Me)", "(I'm So) Afraid of Losing You Again", "I Can't Believe That You've Stopped Loving Me", "I'd Rather Love You", "Is Anybody Goin' to San Antone", "Wonder Could I Live There Anymore", "I'm Just Me", and "Kiss an Angel Good Mornin'". The pop success of these songs reflected the country/pop crossover sound that was reaching country music in the 1960s and early 1970s, known as "Countrypolitan". In 1969, his compilation album The Best of Charley Pride sold more than one million copies, and was awarded a gold disc. Ultimately, Elvis Presley was the only artist who sold more records than Pride on RCA.

Pride performed "All His Children", featured in the film Sometimes a Great Notion (1971). The film received two Oscar nominations in 1972, one for "All His Children".

=== "Kiss an Angel Good Mornin'" ===
In 1971, Pride released what would become his biggest hit, "Kiss an Angel Good Mornin'", a million-selling crossover single. The same year, he won the Country Music Association's entertainer of the year award, as well as its top male vocalist award in 1971 and 1972.

"Kiss an Angel Good Mornin'" became Pride's signature tune. Besides being a five-week country number one in late 1971 and early 1972, the song was also his only pop top-40 hit, hitting number 21, and reaching the top 10 of the Adult Contemporary charts, as well.

=== 1970s and Northern Ireland ===
During the rest of the 1970s and into the 1980s, Pride continued to rack up country music hits. Other Pride standards from this period include "Mississippi Cotton Picking Delta Town", "Someone Loves You, Honey", "When I Stop Leavin' (I'll Be Gone)", "Burgers and Fries", "I Don't Think She's in Love Anymore", "Roll On Mississippi", "Never Been So Loved (In All My Life)", and "You're So Good When You're Bad". Like many other country performers, Pride paid tribute to Hank Williams, with an album of songs that were all written by Hank titled There's a Little Bit of Hank in Me, which included top-sellers of Williams' classics "Kaw-Liga", "Honky Tonk Blues", and "You Win Again". Pride sold more than 70 million records (singles, albums, and compilations included).

In 1975, Pride's agent sold a 40-date tour package to a United Kingdom booking agent, who onward sold four dates to the Dublin-based Irish music promoter Jim Aiken. At the time, the Troubles were at their height, and few nonresident music and sports teams traveled there. Aiken subsequently traveled to Pride's winter 1975/'76 concert in Ohio, and persuaded Pride to play one of the concerts at Belfast's Ritz Cinema. Pride played the concert in November 1976, with his album song "Crystal Chandeliers" subsequently being released as a single in the UK and Ireland. Pride subsequently became a hero to both sides of the conflict for breaking the effective touring concert ban, his song "Crystal Chandeliers" was seen as a unity song, and the success of Pride's visit enabled Aiken to book further acts into Northern Ireland after his appearance.

=== 1980s and beyond ===
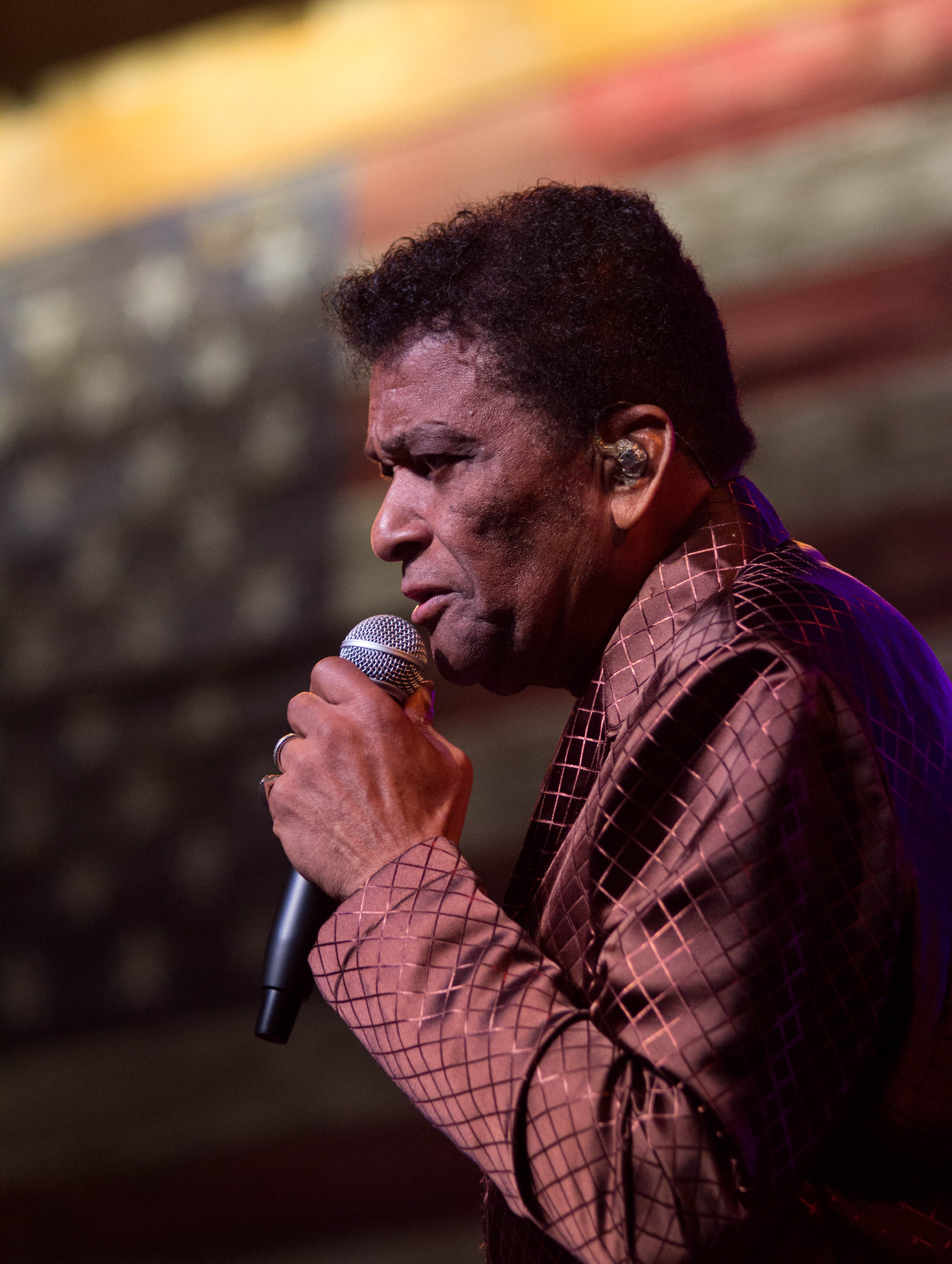
Pride performing at the Republic Country Club in Stafford, Texas, in 2016

Pride performed the national anthem before game six of the 1980 World Series. He also performed the national anthem at Super Bowl VIII and again at game five of the 2010 World Series, accompanied both years by the Del Rio High School JROTC Color Guard.

On May 1, 1993, Pride became a member of the Grand Ole Opry. He celebrated his 25th anniversary of becoming a member with performances at the Opry on May 4 and 5, 2018.

In 1994, Charley Pride published his book Pride: The Charley Pride Story. Pride spoke with John Seigenthaler on Nashville Public Television about the book and his childhood in Mississippi, the impacts of racism throughout his career, and his battle with depression.

In 2016, Pride was selected as one of 30 artists to perform on Forever Country, a mash-up track of "Take Me Home, Country Roads", "On the Road Again", and "I Will Always Love You", which celebrates 50 years of the Country Music Association Awards. Pride released his first album in six years, titled Music in My Heart, on July 7, 2017.

In 2020, the CMA announced that Pride would receive the Willie Nelson Lifetime Achievement Award at the 54th Country Music Association Awards in recognition of his work in the genre. The CEO of the CMA explained that "Charley Pride is the epitome of a trailblazer. Few other artists have grown country music's rich heritage and led to the advancement of country music around the world like Charley. His distinctive voice has created a timeless legacy that continues to echo through the country community today. We could not be more excited to honor Charley with one of CMA's highest accolades."

== Personal life ==
Pride met his wife Rozene while playing baseball in Memphis, Tennessee. They married in 1956 while Pride was on Christmas leave from Army basic training. The couple had two sons, Kraig and Dion, and a daughter, Angela. They also had five grandchildren and two great-grandchildren. They resided in Dallas.

In the late 1970s, Pride had an extramarital affair with an unmarried Dallas flight attendant, and in 1979, she gave birth to a son, Tyler. In 1990, the woman sued Pride for child support, and Pride responded by contesting the boy's paternity. In 1992, after a DNA paternity test demonstrated that Pride was in fact the child's father, a Texas court ordered Pride to pay child support until Tyler's 18th birthday, and further ordered that the boy's surname be changed to Pride.

Pride had a tumor removed from his right vocal cord in 1997 at the University of Arkansas for Medical Sciences. He returned to the site in February 2009 for a routine checkup and surprised the Arkansas Senate with an unplanned performance of five songs. He was joined by Governor Mike Beebe during the show.

Pride was a fan and part owner of the Texas Rangers. He also performed the national anthem at some of the Rangers' games. He was also a Dallas Cowboys fan and created its theme song "We're the Cowboys" in 1979.

Pride was a distant relative of blues guitarist and singer Christone "Kingfish" Ingram.

== Death ==
Pride died from complications related to COVID-19 in Dallas on December 12, 2020. He was 86 years old.

In May 2021, Tyler Pride contested Charley's will, asserting that he had been omitted to maintain "a Pride family secret" and "[protect] Charley's brand and legacy". In a statement to The Dallas Morning News, Rozene—the executor of Charley's will—did not dispute that Tyler was Charley's son, but said that Tyler had been given adequate compensation and recognition during Charley's life, and characterized the lawsuit as a ploy for financial gain. In September 2022, Tyler Pride said that the lawsuit had been settled for undisclosed terms.

== Honors and distinctions ==
- In 2003, a 33-mile (53 km) stretch of Mississippi Highway 3 from Pride's hometown of Sledge to Tutwiler was named "Charley Pride Highway".
- Pride sang the national anthem before game five of the 2010 World Series, played between the Texas Rangers and San Francisco Giants.
- On March 14, 2021, the Texas Rangers baseball team announced that its spring training field in Surprise, Arizona, had been renamed Charley Pride Field.

== Awards and accolades ==
Academy of Country Music Awards

- 1994 Pioneer Award

American Music Awards

- 1973 Favorite Country Album
- 1973 Favorite Country Male Artist
- 1976 Favorite Country Male Artist

Ameripolitan Music Awards

- 2016 Master Award

Country Music Hall of Fame and Museum

- Inducted in 2000

Country Music Association

- 1971 Entertainer of the Year
- 1971 Male Vocalist of the Year
- 1972 Male Vocalist of the Year
- 2020 Lifetime Achievement Award

Grammy Awards

- 1971 Best Sacred Performance (Musical) – "Did You Think to Pray"
- 1972 Best Gospel Performance (other than soul gospel) – "Let Me Live"
- 1973 Best Country Vocal Performance, Male – Charley Pride Sings Heart Songs
- 2017 Lifetime Achievement Award

National Multicultural Western Heritage Museum

- Inducted in 2006

Scandinavian-American Hall of Fame

- 1996 Merit of Distinction Award in the Performing Arts

== Publications ==
- Pride, Charley; Henderson, Jim (1994). Pride: The Charley Pride Story. New York: HarperCollins. ISBN 0-688-14232-X. OCLC 32608269.
