= Jeanne Pruett discography =

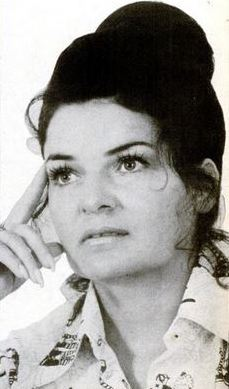
- Jeanne Pruett, 1973
- Studio albums: 6
- Live albums: 1
- Compilation albums: 3
- Singles: 37
- Other appearances: 2

The discography of American country artist Jeanne Pruett consists of six studio albums, one live album, three compilation albums and 37 singles. While working for a publishing company, she signed a recording contract with RCA Records in 1963. She released several singles that did not become successful. In 1969, she signed with Decca Records. Her first charting single was 1971's "Hold to My Unchanging Love". This was followed by "Love Me", which became a top 40 hit and prompted the release of her debut studio album. In 1973, Pruett released the single "Satin Sheets", which became her biggest hit. The song spent several weeks at number one on the Billboard Hot Country Singles chart and crossed over to number 28 on the Hot 100. Its corresponding album of the same name also topped the Billboard Country Albums chart in July 1973.

Pruett followed the song's success with "I'm Your Woman", which also became a top ten hit on the country songs chart. Her self-titled third studio album was released in June 1974 and peaked at number 19 on the country albums chart. The album also included the single, "You Don't Need to Move a Mountain", a top 20 hit on the country chart in 1974. Pruett issued her fourth studio album, Honey on His Hands, in 1975, which reached the top 50 of the country albums survey. It spawned four singles, three of which became top 30 hits on the country chart. Its highest charting hit was "Welcome to the Sunshine (Sweet Baby Jane)" (1974).

Pruett recorded a series of singles that became minor hits during the rest of the 1970s. In 1977, she had one top forty hit with "I'm Living a Lie" on MCA. In late 1977, she briefly moved to Mercury Records. Then, Pruett achieved success with the independent IBC label when three singles became top ten hits on the Billboard country chart: "Back to Back" (1979), "Temporarily Yours" (1980) and "It's Too Late" (1980). They were released on her 1979 studio album, Encore!, which reached number 18 on the country albums chart. Pruett continued recording sporadically throughout the 1980s. Her 1987 single "Rented Room" became her final to reach the Billboard country chart.

== Albums ==
=== Studio albums ===
List of studio albums, with selected chart positions, showing other relevant details
Title	Album details	Peak chart positions	
Title	Album details	US	US Cou.
Love Me	Released: October 1972; Label: Decca; Formats: LP	—	—
Satin Sheets	Released: June 1973; Label: MCA; Formats: LP	122	1
Jeanne Pruett	Released: June 1974; Label: MCA; Formats: LP	—	19
Honey on His Hands	Released: June 1975; Label: MCA; Formats: LP	—	48
Encore!	Released: November 1979; Label: IBC; Formats: LP	—	18
Jeanne Pruett	Released: 1985; Label: Dot/MCA; Formats: Cassette, LP	—	—
"—" denotes a recording that did not chart or was not released in that territory.

=== Live albums ===
List of albums, showing relevant details
Title	Album details
Audiograph Alive	Released: 1982; Label: Audiograph; Formats: LP

=== Compilation albums ===
List of albums, showing relevant details
Title	Album details
Welcome to the Sunshine	Released: November 1975; Label: MCA; Formats: LP
Star Studded Nights	Released: 1982; Label: Audiograph; Formats: LP
Satin Sheets: Greatest Hits	Released: September 22, 1998; Label: Varèse Vintage; Formats: CD

== Singles ==
List of singles, with selected chart positions, showing other relevant details
Title	Year	Peak chart positions						Album
Title	Year	US	US Cou.	AUS	CAN	CAN Cou.	CAN AC	Album
"Just a Little After Heartaches"	1963	—	—	—	—	—	—	Non-album singles
"The Things I Don't Know"	1963	—	—	—	—	—	—	Non-album singles
"As a Matter of Fact"	1964	—	—	—	—	—	—	Non-album singles
"One Day Ahead of My Tears"	1968	—	—	—	—	—	—	Non-album singles
"Make Me Feel Like a Woman Again"	1969	—	—	—	—	—	—	Non-album singles
"At the Sight of You"	1970	—	—	—	—	—	—	Non-album singles
"King Size Bed"	1970	—	—	—	—	—	—	Non-album singles
"Hold to My Unchanging Love"	1971	—	66	—	—	—	—	Love Me
"Love Me"	1972	—	34	—	—	—	—	Love Me
"Call on Me"	1972	—	64	—	—	—	—	Love Me
"I Forgot More Than You'll Ever Know (About Him)"	1972	—	60	—	—	—	—	Love Me
"Satin Sheets"	1973	28	1	20	76	3	66	Satin Sheets
"I'm Your Woman"	1973	—	8	—	—	8	—	Jeanne Pruett (1974 album)
"You Don't Need to Move a Mountain"	1974	—	15	—	—	34	—	Jeanne Pruett (1974 album)
"Welcome to the Sunshine (Sweet Baby Jane)"	1974	—	22	—	—	24	—	Honey on His Hands
"Just Like Your Daddy"	1974	—	25	—	—	—	—	Honey on His Hands
"Honey on His Hands"	1975	—	41	—	—	—	—	Honey on His Hands
"A Poor Man's Woman"	1975	—	24	—	—	46	—	Honey on His Hands
"My Baby's Gone"	1975	—	77	—	—	—	—	Non-album singles
"Sweet Sorrow"	1976	—	—	—	—	—	—	Non-album singles
"I'm Not Girl Enough to Hold You"	1976	—	—	—	—	—	—	Non-album singles
"I've Taken"	1976	—	41	—	—	—	—	Non-album singles
"I'm Living a Lie"	1977	—	30	—	—	—	—	Non-album singles
"She's Still All Over You"	1977	—	85	—	—	—	—	Non-album singles
"I'm a Woman"	1978	—	94	—	—	—	—	Non-album singles
"I Guess I'm That Good At Being Bad"	1978	—	—	—	—	—	—	Non-album singles
"Please Sing Satin Sheets for Me"	1979	—	54	—	—	—	—	Encore!
"Back to Back"	1979	—	6	—	—	—	—	Encore!
"Temporarily Yours"	1980	—	5	—	—	25	—	Encore!
"It's Too Late"	1980	—	9	—	—	—	—	Non-album singles
"Sad Ole Shade of Grey"	1981	—	81	—	—	—	—	Non-album singles
"I Ought to Feel Guilty"	1981	—	72	—	—	—	—	Star Studded Nights
"Star Studded Nights"	1982	—	—	—	—	—	—	Star Studded Nights
"Love Me" (with Marty Robbins)	1983	—	58	—	—	—	—	Non-album singles
"Lady of the Eighties"	1983	—	73	—	—	—	—	Non-album singles
"We Came So Close"	1983	—	—	—	—	—	—	Non-album singles
"Rented Room"	1987	—	81	—	—	—	—	Non-album singles
"—" denotes a recording that did not chart or was not released in that territory.

== Other album appearances ==
List of non-single guest appearances, with other performing artists, showing year released and album name
Title	Year	Other artist(s)	Album	Ref.
"Standing on Promises"	1988	—N/a	More Gospel Country	
"Grow Old Beside Me"	2001	Hank Locklin	Generations in Song	
