= Johnny Rodriguez discography =

American singer's discography

The discography of American country singer Johnny Rodriguez contains studio albums, compilation albums, singles, and music videos.

== Albums ==
Year	Album	Chart positions		Label
Year	Album	US Country	US	Label
1973	Introducing	1	156	Mercury
1973	All I Ever Meant to Do Was Sing	2	174	Mercury
1974	My Third Album	5	—	Mercury
1974	Songs About Ladies and Love	7	—	Mercury
1974	Country Classics	—	—	Mercury
1975	Just Get up and Close the Door	5	—	Mercury
1976	Love Put a Song in My Heart	3	—	Mercury
1976	Greatest Hits	2	—	Mercury
1976	Reflecting	11	—	Mercury
1977	Practice Makes Perfect	18	—	Mercury
1977	Just for You	35	—	Mercury
1978	Love Me with All Your Heart	19	—	Mercury
1978	Rodriguez Was Here	—	—	Mercury
1979	Sketches	—	—	Mercury
1979	Rodriguez	45	—	Epic
1980	Through My Eyes	—	—	Epic
1980	Gypsy^{A}	—	—	Epic
1981	After the Rain	—	—	Epic
1982	Biggest Hits	—	—	Epic
1983	For Every Rose	30	—	Epic
1984	Foolin' with Fire	35	—	Epic
1986	Full Circle	—	—	Epic
1988	Gracias	—	—	Capitol
1993	Run for the Border	—	—	Intersound
1995	Super Hits	—	—	Epic
1996	You Can Say That Again	—	—	Hightone
1996	Funny Things Happen to Fun Lovin' People	—	—	Paula
1997	The Hits	—	—	Mercury
1998	Johnny Rodriguez	—	—	K-Tel
2001	Back to Back	—	—	Intercontinental
2002	Desperado: His First Twenty Hits	—	—	Mercury
2004	Desperado: A Decade of Hits	—	—	Compendia
2004	Greatest Hits	—	—	K-Tel
2005	Greatest Hits	—	—	Intersound
2006	Country Chart-Toppers: Johnny Rodriguez	—	—	Sterling
2006	20th Century Masters - The Millennium Collection: The Best of Johnny Rodriguez	—	—	Mercury
2006	Lone Star Desperado	—	—	American Legends
2007	Desperado	—	—	KRB
2008	20 Greatest Hits	—	—	TeeVee
2012	Live from Texas	—	—	RunninWide

- ^{A}Gypsy peaked at number 18 on the RPM Country Albums chart in Canada.

== Singles ==
Year	Single	Chart positions			Album
Year	Single	US Country	US	CAN Country	Album
1973	"Pass Me By (If You're Only Passing Through)"	9	—	7	Introducing Johnny Rodriguez
1973	"You Always Come Back (To Hurting Me)"	1	86	1	Introducing Johnny Rodriguez
1973	"Ridin' My Thumb to Mexico"	1	70	1	All I Ever Meant to Do Was Sing
1974	"That's the Way Love Goes"	1	—	2	All I Ever Meant to Do Was Sing
1974	"Something"	6	85	11	My Third Album
1974	"Dance with Me (Just One More Time)"	2	—	1	My Third Album
1974	"We're Over"	3	—	1	Songs About Ladies and Love
1975	"I Just Can't Get Her Out of My Mind"	1	—	3	Songs About Ladies and Love
1975	"Just Get Up and Close the Door"	1	—	2	Just Get Up and Close the Door
1975	"Love Put a Song in My Heart"	1	—	3	Love Put a Song In My Heart
1976	"I Couldn't Be Me Without You"	3	—	2	Love Put a Song In My Heart
1976	"I Wonder If I Ever Said Goodbye"	2	—	2	Reflecting
1976	"Hillbilly Heart"	5	—	2	Reflecting
1977	"Desperado"	5	—	5	Reflecting
1977	"If Practice Makes Perfect"	5	—	5	If Practice Makes Perfect
1977	"Eres tú"	25	—	22	If Practice Makes Perfect
1977	"Savin' This Love Song for You"	14	—	—	Just for You
1978	"We Believe in Happy Endings"	7	—	12	Just for You
1978	"Cuando Caliente el Sol (Love Me with All Your Heart)"	7	—	13	Love Me with All Your Heart
1979	"Alibis"	16	—	16	Rodriguez Was Here
1979	"Down on the Rio Grande"	6	—	13	Rodriguez
1979	"Fools for Each Other"	17	—	44	Rodriguez
1980	"What'll I Tell Virginia"	19	—	33	Through My Eyes
1980	"Love Look at Us Now"	29	—	54	Through My Eyes
1980	"North of the Border"	17	—	16	Gypsy
1981	"I Want You Tonight"	22	—	49	After the Rain
1981	"Trying Not to Love You"	30	—	39	After the Rain
1981	"It's Not the Same Without You"	73	—	—	Biggest Hits
1982	"Born with the Blues"	66	—	—	Biggest Hits
1982	"He's Not Entitled to Your Love"	89	—	—	—
1983	"Foolin'"	4	—	8	For Every Rose
1983	"How Could I Love Her So Much"	6	—	16	For Every Rose
1983	"Back on Her Mind Again"	35	—	—	For Every Rose
1984	"Too Late to Go Home"	15	—	32	Foolin' with Fire
1984	"Let's Leave the Lights On Tonight"	30	—	29	Foolin' with Fire
1984	"First Time Burned"	63	—	—	Foolin' with Fire
1984	"Rose of My Heart"	60	—	—	Foolin' with Fire
1985	"Here I Am Again"	69	—	—	Full Circle
1986	"She Don't Cry Like She Used To"	51	—	50	—
1988	"I Didn't (Every Chance I Had)"	12	—	14	Gracias
1988	"I Wanta Wake Up with You"	41	—	68	Gracias
1988	"You Might Want to Use Me Again"	44	—	—	Gracias
1989	"No Chance to Dance"	72	—	—	Gracias
1989	"Back to Stay"	78	—	—	Gracias
1993	"Run for the Border"	—	—	—	Run for the Border
1996	"You Can Say That Again"	—	—	—	You Can Say That Again
1996	"One Bar at a Time"	—	—	—	Funny Things Happen to Fun Lovin' People

=== Guest singles ===
Year	Single	Artist	Chart positions		Album
Year	Single	Artist	US Country	CAN Country	Album
1979	"I Hate the Way I Love It"	Charly McClain	16	65	Women Get Lonely
1990	"Tomorrow's World"	Various artists	74	—	single only
2025	"Thing About Texas"	Ronnie McDowell	—	—	single only

=== Music videos ===
Year	Video	Director
1990	"Tomorrow's World" (Various)	Gustavo Garzon
1993	"Run for the Border"	Tom Bevins
1996	"You Can Say That Again"	
