= List of RPM number-one country singles of 1975 =

These are the Canadian number-one country songs of 1975, per the RPM Country Tracks chart.

Issue date	Title	Artist
January 11	We're Over	Johnny Rodriguez
January 18	What a Man My Man Is	Lynn Anderson
January 25	The Door	George Jones
February 1	Big Red Jimmy	Jerry Warren
February 8	Kentucky Gambler	Merle Haggard
February 15	(I'd Be) A Legend in My Time	Ronnie Milsap
February 22	Then Who Am I	Charley Pride
March 1	Devil in the Bottle	T. G. Sheppard
March 15	It's Time to Pay the Fiddler	Cal Smith
March 22	Linda on My Mind	Conway Twitty
March 29	Before the Next Teardrop Falls	Freddy Fender
April 5	Everybody's Going to the Country	Hank Smith
April 12	Have You Never Been Mellow	Olivia Newton-John
April 19	The Pill	Loretta Lynn
April 26	The Pill	Loretta Lynn
May 3	I've Never Been This Far Before	Carroll Baker
May 10	Still Thinkin' 'bout You	Billy "Crash" Craddock
May 17	Roll On Big Mama	Joe Stampley
May 24	Thank God I'm a Country Boy	John Denver
May 31	Thank God I'm a Country Boy	John Denver
June 7	Window Up Above	Mickey Gilley
June 14	I'm Not Lisa	Jessi Colter
June 21	I Ain't All Bad	Charley Pride
June 28	You're My Best Friend	Don Williams
July 5	Lizzie and the Rainman	Tanya Tucker
July 12	Reconsider Me	Narvel Felts
July 19	When Will I Be Loved	Linda Ronstadt
July 26	Yellow House of Love	Patti MacDonnell
August 2	The Hungry Fire of Love	Carroll Baker
August 9	Down by the Henry Moore	Murray McLauchlan
August 16	Every Time You Touch Me (I Get High)	Charlie Rich
August 23	The Seeker	Dolly Parton
August 30	Rhinestone Cowboy	Glen Campbell
September 6	Please Mr. Please	Olivia Newton-John
September 13	The First Time	Freddie Hart
September 20	I'll Go to My Grave Loving You	The Statler Brothers
September 27	If I Could Only Win Your Love	Emmylou Harris
October 4	Say Forever You'll Be Mine	Dolly Parton and Porter Wagoner
October 11	Say Forever You'll Be Mine	Dolly Parton and Porter Wagoner
October 18	Say Forever You'll Be Mine	Dolly Parton and Porter Wagoner
October 25	Third Rate Romance	Amazing Rhythm Aces
December 20	Secret Love	Freddy Fender
December 27	Secret Love	Freddy Fender

== See also ==
- 1975 in music
- List of number-one country hits of 1975 (U.S.)
