= List of Hot Country Singles number ones of 1975 =

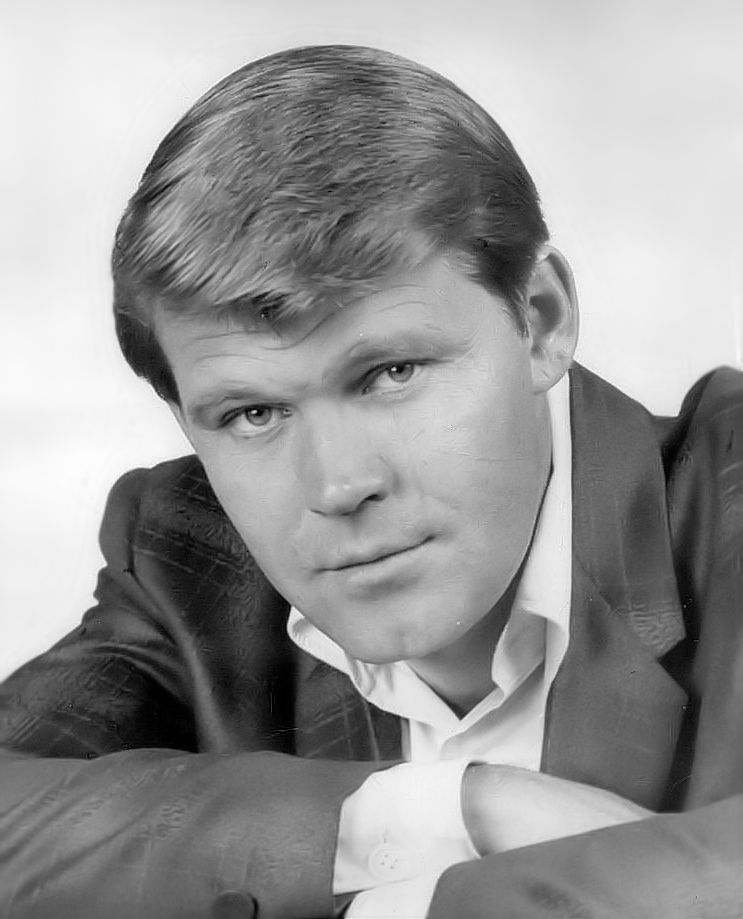
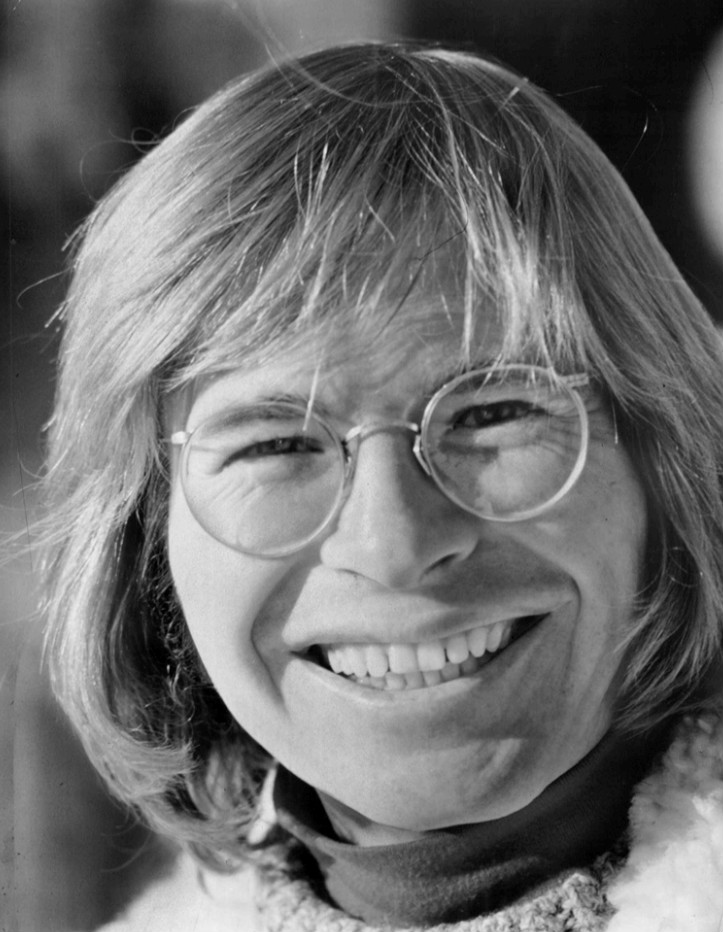
Glen Campbell (left) and John Denver both released singles in 1975 which topped both the country chart and the Billboard Hot 100.

Hot Country Songs is a chart that ranks the top-performing country music songs in the United States, published by Billboard magazine. In 1975, 43 different singles topped the chart, at the time published under the title Hot Country Singles, in 52 issues of the magazine. Chart placings were based on playlists submitted by country music radio stations and sales reports submitted by stores.

Merle Haggard had the most number ones in 1975, taking four different singles to the top spot. The four singles spent a total of five weeks at number one, tying Haggard with Freddy Fender for the highest number of weeks spent atop the chart by a single artist in 1975. When Fender reached number one with "Before the Next Teardrop Falls" in the issue of Billboard dated March 15, he achieved the feat of topping the Hot Country chart with his first hit. The Tex-Mex-influenced song went on to be a crossover success, topping Billboard's all-genre singles chart, the Hot 100, in May. Five other singles released in 1975 reached number one on both charts: "(Hey Won't You Play) Another Somebody Done Somebody Wrong Song" by B.J. Thomas, "Rhinestone Cowboy" by Glen Campbell, both "Thank God I'm a Country Boy" and "I'm Sorry" by John Denver, and "Convoy" by C.W. McCall. "Rhinestone Cowboy" spent three non-consecutive weeks atop the country listing, the only song to spend more than two weeks in the top spot.

In October, Willie Nelson had his first number one single with "Blue Eyes Crying in the Rain", taken from his breakthrough album Red Headed Stranger. The song's arrangement was simple and contrasted with the lush country-pop style prevalent at the time which characterized the recordings of crossover artists such as Glen Campbell. Nelson had been active as a singer and songwriter since the 1960s and several of his songs had been chart-toppers for other artists, but his own recordings had not achieved great success prior to 1975. "Blue Eyes Crying in the Rain" marked the start of his transformation into a major star of country music who remained a regular chart-topper for a decade and was inducted into the Country Music Hall of Fame in 1993. Eight other artists topped the Hot Country chart for the first time in 1975. T. G. Sheppard achieved his first number one in February with "Devil in the Bottle", and followed it up later in the year with his second, "Tryin' to Beat the Morning Home". Billie Jo Spears gained her only number one with "Blanket on the Ground", as did Gary Stewart with "She's Actin' Single (I'm Drinkin' Doubles)". Linda Ronstadt and B. J. Thomas each topped the country chart for the first time having already achieved a chart-topper with an earlier single on the Hot 100. Other acts to achieve a first number one on the Hot Country chart in 1975 were Jessi Colter, Dickey Lee, and C. W. McCall, whose song "Convoy" reached the top of the chart in the issue of Billboard dated December 20, beginning a run which would ultimately last for six weeks.

== Chart history ==
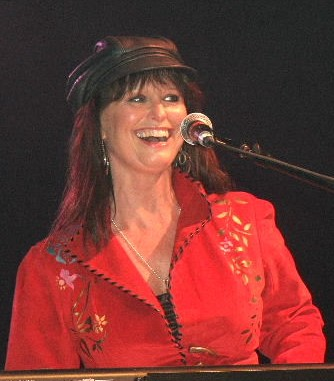
Jessi Colter achieved her first number one in 1975.

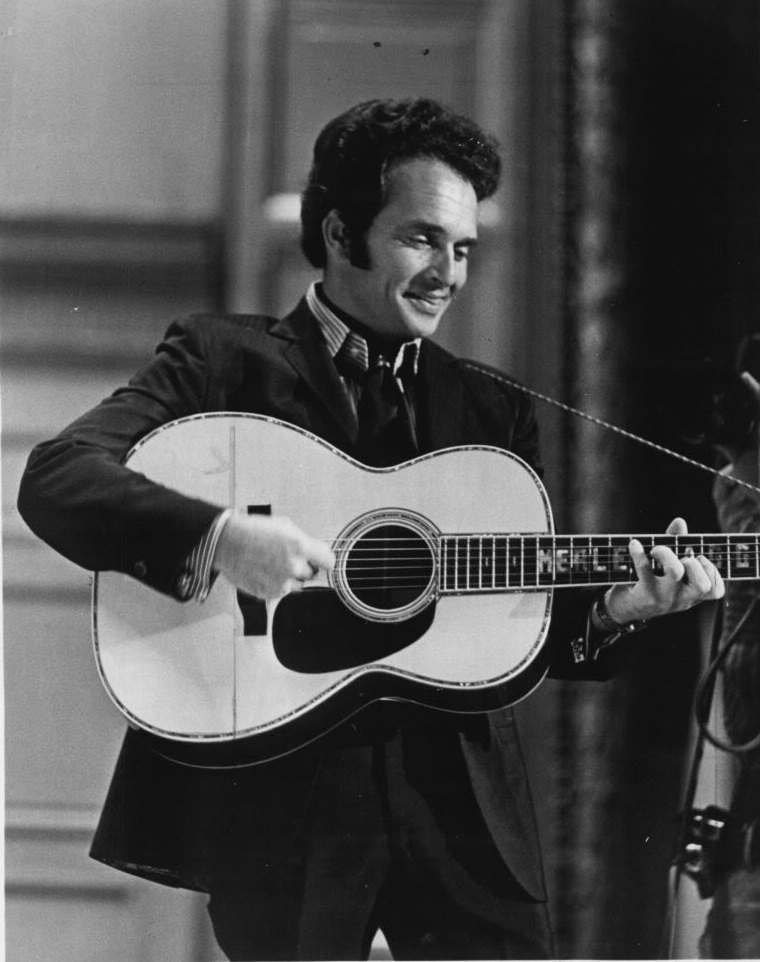
Merle Haggard had four number ones during the year.

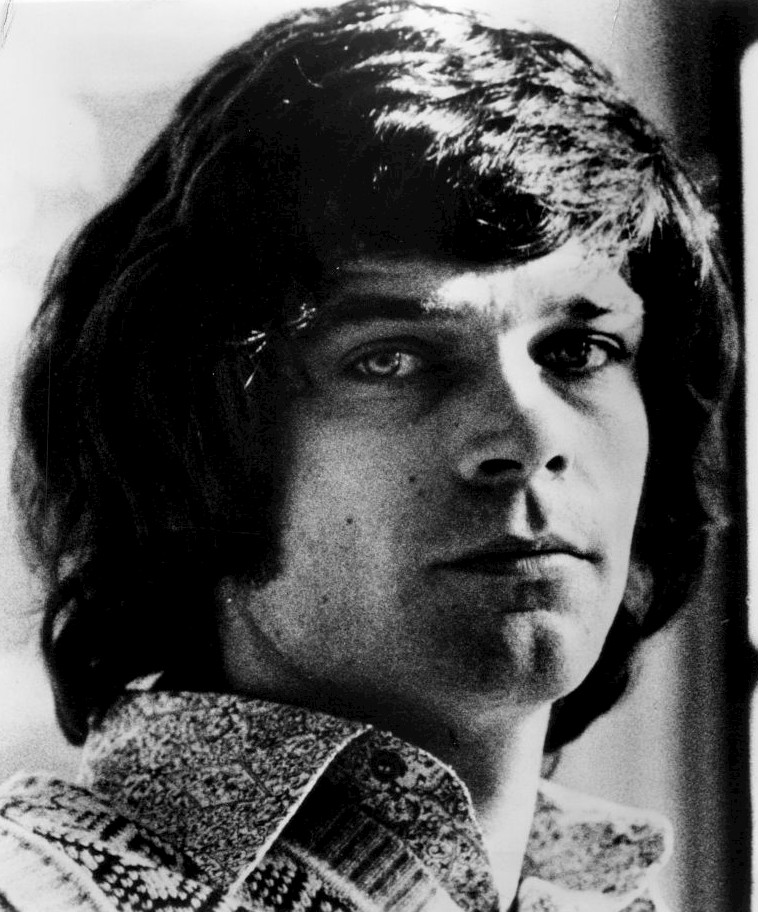
B. J. Thomas was one of five artists to top both the country chart and the Billboard Hot 100 with singles released in 1975.

Issue date	Title	Artist(s)	Ref.
January 4	"The Door"	George Jones	
January 11	"Ruby Baby"	Billy "Crash" Craddock	
January 18	"Kentucky Gambler"	Merle Haggard	
January 25	"(I'd Be) A Legend in My Time"	Ronnie Milsap	
February 1	"City Lights"	Mickey Gilley	
February 8	"Then Who Am I"	Charley Pride	
February 15	"Devil in the Bottle"	T.G. Sheppard	
February 22	"I Care"	Tom T. Hall	
March 1	"It's Time to Pay the Fiddler"	Cal Smith	
March 8	"Linda on My Mind"	Conway Twitty	
March 15	"Before the Next Teardrop Falls"	Freddy Fender	
March 22	"Before the Next Teardrop Falls"	Freddy Fender	
March 29	"The Bargain Store"	Dolly Parton	
April 5	"I Just Can't Get Her Out of My Mind"	Johnny Rodriguez	
April 12	"Always Wanting You"	Merle Haggard	
April 19	"Always Wanting You"	Merle Haggard	
April 26	"Blanket on the Ground"	Billie Jo Spears	
May 3	"Roll On Big Mama"	Joe Stampley	
May 10	"She's Actin' Single (I'm Drinkin' Doubles)"	Gary Stewart	
May 17	"(Hey Won't You Play) Another Somebody Done Somebody Wrong Song"	B.J. Thomas	
May 24	"I'm Not Lisa"	Jessi Colter	
May 31	"Thank God I'm a Country Boy"	John Denver	
June 7	"Window Up Above"	Mickey Gilley	
June 14	"When Will I Be Loved"	Linda Ronstadt	
June 21	"You're My Best Friend"	Don Williams	
June 28	"Tryin' to Beat the Morning Home"	T.G. Sheppard	
July 5	"Lizzie and the Rainman"	Tanya Tucker	
July 12	"Movin' On"	Merle Haggard	
July 19	"Touch the Hand"	Conway Twitty	
July 26	"Touch the Hand"	Conway Twitty	
August 2	"Just Get Up and Close the Door"	Johnny Rodriguez	
August 9	"Wasted Days and Wasted Nights"	Freddy Fender	
August 16	"Wasted Days and Wasted Nights"	Freddy Fender	
August 23	"Rhinestone Cowboy"	Glen Campbell	
August 30	"Rhinestone Cowboy"	Glen Campbell	
September 6	"Feelins'"	Loretta Lynn & Conway Twitty	
September 13	"Rhinestone Cowboy"	Glen Campbell	
September 20	"Daydreams About Night Things"	Ronnie Milsap	
September 27	"Daydreams About Night Things"	Ronnie Milsap	
October 4	"Blue Eyes Crying in the Rain"	Willie Nelson	
October 11	"Blue Eyes Crying in the Rain"	Willie Nelson	
October 18	"Hope You're Feelin' Me (Like I'm Feelin' You)"	Charley Pride	
October 25	"San Antonio Stroll"	Tanya Tucker	
November 1	"(Turn Out the Light And) Love Me Tonight"	Don Williams	
November 8	"I'm Sorry"	John Denver	
November 15	"Are You Sure Hank Done It This Way"	Waylon Jennings	
November 22	"Rocky"	Dickey Lee	
November 29	"It's All in the Movies"	Merle Haggard	
December 6	"Secret Love"	Freddy Fender	
December 13	"Love Put a Song in My Heart"	Johnny Rodriguez	
December 20	"Convoy"	C. W. McCall	
December 27	"Convoy"	C. W. McCall	

== See also ==
- 1975 in music
- List of artists who reached number one on the U.S. country chart
