= 1973 Country Music Association Awards =

Annual US music awards ceremony

- Date: October 15, 1973
- Location: Ryman Auditorium, Nashville, Tennessee
- Hosted by: Johnny Cash
- Most wins: Charlie Rich (3)
- Most nominations: Tom T. Hall; Loretta Lynn (5 each)

Television/radio coverage
- Network: CBS

The 1973 Country Music Association Awards, 7th Ceremony, was held on October 15, 1973, at the Ryman Auditorium, Nashville, Tennessee, and was hosted by CMA Award winner Johnny Cash. This was also the last CMA Awards ceremony to be held at the Ryman.

== Winners and nominees ==
Winners in Bold.

Entertainer of the Year	Album of the Year
**Roy Clark**; Merle Haggard; Tom T. Hall; Loretta Lynn; Charley Pride	**Behind Closed Doors — Charlie Rich**; Entertainer of the Year — Loretta Lynn; Louisiana Woman, Mississippi Man — Conway Twitty and Loretta Lynn; Satin Sheets — Jeanne Pruett; The Storyteller — Tom T. Hall
Male Vocalist of the Year	Female Vocalist of the Year
**Charlie Rich**; Merle Haggard; Tom T. Hall; Johnny Rodriguez; Conway Twitty	**Loretta Lynn**; Donna Fargo; Jeanne Pruett; Tanya Tucker; Tammy Wynette
Vocal Group of the Year	Vocal Duo of the Year
**Statler Brothers**; The Carter Family; The Jordanaires; The Osborne Brothers; Tompall & the Glaser Brothers	**Conway Twitty and Loretta Lynn**; Jack Greene and Jeannie Seely; George Jones and Tammy Wynette; Barbara Mandrell and David Houston; Porter Wagoner and Dolly Parton
Single of the Year	Song of the Year
**"Behind Closed Doors" — Charlie Rich**; "(Old Dogs, Children And) Watermelon Wine" — Tom T. Hall; "Satin Sheets" — Jeanne Pruett; "The Lord Knows I'm Drinking" — Cal Smith; "Why Me" — Kris Kristofferson	**"Behind Closed Doors" — Kenny O'Dell**; "It's Not Love (But It's Not Bad)" — Hank Cochran, Glenn Martin; "(Old Dogs, Children And) Watermelon Wine" — Tom T. Hall; "Satin Sheets" — John Volinkaty; "Why Me" — Kris Kristofferson
Instrumental Group of the Year	Instrumentalist of the Year
**Danny Davis and the Nashville Brass**; Chet Atkins and Jerry Reed; Po' Boys; The Strangers; Wagon Masters	**Charlie McCoy**; Chet Atkins; Roy Clark; Floyd Cramer; Lloyd Green; Jerry Reed

== Hall of Fame ==
Country Music Hall of Fame Inductees
- Chet Atkins
  Patsy Cline
