= Satin Sheets (disambiguation) =

Satin Sheets is a 1973 album by Jeanne Pruett.

Satin Sheets may also refer to:

- "Satin Sheets" (Jeanne Pruett song), the title song on the album
- "Satin Sheets" (Sharon O'Neill song), 1990
- "Satin Sheets" (Silverchair song), 1999
- "Satin Sheets" (Willis Alan Ramsey song), 1972
