= The Happiness of Having You =

The Happiness of Having You may refer to:

- The Happiness of Having You (song), a 1975 song by Charley Pride
- The Happiness of Having You (album), a 1975 album by Charley Pride
