= Love Me (Jeanne Pruett album) =

Studio album by Jeanne Pruett
- Released: October 1972
- Recorded: 1971–1972
- Studio: Bradley's Barn, Mount Juliet, Tennessee
- Genre: Country; traditional country
- Length: 29:42
- Label: Decca
- Producer: Walter Haynes

Jeanne Pruett chronology
Love Me (1972)	Satin Sheets (1973)

Singles from Love Me
- 1. "Hold to My Unchanging Love" Released: July 1971; 2. "Love Me" Released: January 1972; 3. "Call on Me" Released: June 1972; 4. "I Forgot More Than You'll Ever Know (About Him)" Released: August 1972

Love Me is the debut studio album by American country music artist Jeanne Pruett. It was released in October 1972 on Decca Records and was produced by Walter Haynes. Love Me was the debut studio recording in Pruett's music career and the first of several albums she issued with the Decca (later renamed MCA) label. The album contained 11 tracks, four of which were released as a singles and became charting hits on the national country music charts.

== Background and content ==
Love Me was recorded between 1971 and 1972 at Bradley's Barn, a studio located in Mount Juliet, Tennessee. The sessions were produced by Walter Haynes. The project was a collection of 11 tracks. According to Pruett, each of the songs chosen for the album were handpicked by Pruett and Haynes as a collaborative team. She also chose to dedicate the album to her agent, Hubert Long, who encouraged her music career. Four of the album's tracks were composed by Pruett herself. This included two singles that were later released. The album also included cover versions of material first cut by other country artists. Among the album's cover was Dolly Parton's "Lost Forever in Your Kiss", The Davis Sisters' "I Forgot More Than You'll Ever Know" and Donna Fargo's "The Happiest Girl in the Whole U.S.A.".

== Release and reception ==
Love Me was released in October 1972 on Decca Records, making it Pruett's debut studio album. The project was issued as a vinyl recording, featuring six songs on "side one" and five songs on "side two" of the LP. Love Me did not reach a position on any Billboard magazine album charts following its release, including the Top Country Albums list. The magazine did however give the release a positive response in 1972. "A sterling, stirring effort for the debut of Jeanne Pruett," critics wrote. The publication also highlighted several tracks that they believed were standouts, including her cover of "I Forgot More Than You'll Ever Know".

Love Me included four singles that were released between 1971 and 1972. All the songs became charting singles on the Billboard Hot Country Singlessurvey. The first to be issued was the self-composed "Hold to My Unchanging Love" in July 1972. It became Pruett's first charting single in her career, reaching number 66 on the country chart. The title track was released in January 1972. The song reached number 34 on the Billboard country singles chart, becoming the album's only top 40 hit. "Call on Me" was issued as the third single in June 1972. Spending three weeks on the Billboard country chart, it only reached number 64 by August. "I Forgot More Than You'll Ever Know" was the fourth and final single released, which occurred in August 1972. After spending six weeks charting, it only reached number 60 on the country chart.

== Track listing ==
Side one
No.	Title	Writer(s)	Length
1.	"Love Me"	Jeanne Pruett	3:34
2.	"Hold to My Unchanging Love"	Pruett	3:01
3.	"Call on Me"	Pruett	2:59
4.	"Lost Forever in Your Kiss"	Dolly Parton	2:45
5.	"Darlin'"	Ray Griff	2:36
6.	"The Happiest Girl in the Whole U.S.A."	Donna Fargo	2:10

Side two
No.	Title	Writer(s)	Length
1.	"To Get to You"	Jean Chapel	2:50
2.	"My Eyes Can Only See as Far as You"	Naomi Martin; Jimmy Payne	2:40
3.	"Stay on His Mind"	Ben Peters	2:30
4.	"I Forgot More Than You'll Ever Know (About Him)"	Cecil Null	2:28
5.	"Nothin' But the Love You Give Me"	Pruett	2:10

== Personnel ==
All credits are adapted from the liner notes of Love Me.

Musical personnel

- Harold Bradley – guitar
- Winnifred Breast – background vocals
- Ray Edenton – guitar
- Buddy Harman – drums
- Walter Haynes – steel guitar
- The Jordanaires – background vocals
- Millie Kirkham – background vocals
- Grady Martin – guitar
- Charlie McCoy – harmonica, vibes
- Bob Moore – bass
- LaVerna Moore – background vocals
- Jeanne Pruett – lead vocals, harmony vocals
- Hal Rugg – steel guitar
- Jerry Smith – piano
- Pete Wade – guitar
- Duane West – background vocals

Technical personnel

- Walter Haynes – producer
- Dan Quest – photography

== Release history ==
Region	Date	Format	Label	Ref.
United States	October 1972	Vinyl	Decca	
Canada	October 1972	Vinyl	Decca	
