= Temporarily Yours (song) =

Single by Jeanne Pruett

from the album Encore!
- B-side: "Ain't We Sad Today"
- Released: February 1980
- Recorded: July 1979
- Genre: Country
- Length: 3:15
- Label: IBC
- Songwriter(s): Bobby Fischer, Sonny Throckmorton
- Producer(s): Walter Haynes

Jeanne Pruett singles chronology
"Back to Back" (1979)	"Temporarily Yours" (1980)	"It's Too Late" (1980)

"Temporarily Yours" is a single by American country music artist Jeanne Pruett. Released in February 1980, and was the third single from the album Encore!. The song reached #5 on the Billboard Hot Country Singles chart, becoming her biggest hit single on that chart since 1973's "Satin Sheets".

== Charts ==
=== Weekly charts ===
Chart (1980)	Peak position
US Hot Country Songs (Billboard)	5
Canadian RPM Country Tracks	25

=== Year-end charts ===
Chart (1980)	Position
US Hot Country Songs (Billboard)	46
