= Jeanne Pruett (1974 album) =

Studio album by Jeanne Pruett
- Released: June 1974
- Recorded: 1974
- Studio: Bradley's Barn, Mount Juliet, Tennessee
- Genre: Country; traditional country
- Length: 31:08
- Label: MCA
- Producer: Walter Haynes

Jeanne Pruett chronology
Satin Sheets (1973)	Jeanne Pruett (1974)	Honey on His Hands (1975)

Singles from Jeanne Pruett
- 1. "I'm Your Woman" Released: August 1973; 2. "You Don't Need to Move a Mountain" Released: February 1974

Jeanne Pruett is a studio album by American country music artist Jeanne Pruett. It was released in June 1974 on MCA Records and was produced by Walter Haynes. It was Pruett's third studio album issued in her recording career. The project was also one of two eponymous studio albums she released in her career.

The album consists of 11 tracks, two of which were released as singles and became major hits.

== Background and content ==
Jeanne Pruett was recorded in 1974 at Bradley's Barn, a studio located in Mount Juliet, Tennessee. The sessions were produced by Walter Haynes. It was Pruett's third production assignment with Haynes. The album was a collection of 11 tracks. Four of the album's tracks were written by Pruett herself. Among the self-penned songs was a remake of her 1971 single "Hold on to My Unchanging Love". The eponymous release also featured songs written by established country music songwriters. This included Bobby Braddock and Curly Putman, who wrote the track "Come to Me". The album also included a cover version of Don Williams' "Lay Down Beside Me". In later years, the song would become a major hit for Williams.

== Release and reception ==
Professional ratings
Review scores
Source	Rating
Billboard	Favorable

Jeanne Pruett was released in June 1974 on MCA Records, becoming her third studio recording. It was issued as a vinyl LP, with five songs featured on "side one" and six songs featured on "side two" of the record. Upon its release, the album debuted on the Billboard Top Country Albums chart and spent 15 weeks on it before reaching number 19 in August 1974. The eponymous release was reviewed positively by Billboard magazine in 1974, praising her self-written material. "To say she gets better with each release is an understatement. This marvelous singer has done a phenomenal job with the entire album, but the best cuts are those she has done from her own pen," staff writers wrote.

The album included two singles that became major hits between 1973 and 1974. The first to be released was "I'm Your Woman" in August 1973. The song became Pruett's second major hit, reaching number eight on the Billboard Hot Country Singles chart. It also became a major hit on the Canadian RPM Country Singles chart, reaching number eight as well. The second and final single released was "You Don't Need to Move a Mountain" in February 1974. Spending 14 weeks on the Hot Country Singles chart, it peaked at number 15 in May. It also made a chart appearance on the RPM country chart, reaching only number 34.

== Track listing ==
Side one
No.	Title	Writer(s)	Length
1.	"You Don't Need to Move a Mountain"	Wayland Holyfield; Jim Rushing	2:46
2.	"One More Time"	Walter Haynes; Jeanne Pruett	2:38
3.	"Oh, So Good"	Alan Ross	2:35
4.	"Lay Down Beside Me"	Don Williams	2:52
5.	"I Can't Keep My Hands Off of You"	Bobby Borchers; Mack Vickery	2:52

Side two
No.	Title	Writer(s)	Length
1.	"Hold on to My Unchanging Love"	Pruett	3:03
2.	"I'm Your Woman"	Don W. Johnson	2:57
3.	"Hopefully (I'll Be Out of My Mind)"	Pruett	2:58
4.	"Come to Me"	Bobby Braddock; Curly Putman	2:16
5.	"Nobody's Baby But Mine"	Jimmie Davis; Pruett	2:56
6.	"Everybody Has a Love Story"	Davis; Haynes	2:51

== Personnel ==
All credits are adapted from the liner notes of Jeanne Pruett.

Musical personnel

- Harold Bradley – guitar
- Winnie Breast – background vocals
- David Briggs – piano
- Dorothy Deleonibus – background vocals
- Ray Edenton – guitar
- Lloyd Green – steel guitar
- Buddy Harman – drums
- The Jordanaires – background vocals
- Millie Kirkham – background vocals
- Mike Leech – bass
- Kenny Malone – drums
- Bob Moore – bass
- Laverna Moore – background vocals
- Grady Martin – guitar
- Jeanne Pruett – lead vocals, background vocals
- Hargus "Pig" Robbins – piano
- Troy Seals – guitar
- Jerry Smith – piano
- Pete Wade – guitar
- Ernest West – background vocals
- Reggie Young – guitar

Technical personnel

- Bobby Bradley – engineering
- Walter Haynes – producer
- Darrell Johnson – mastering
- Joe Mills – mixing, engineering
- Jeanne Pruett – liner notes
- Dan Quest and Associates – cover photo

== Chart performance ==
Chart (1974)	Peak position
US Top Country Albums (Billboard)	19

== Release history ==
Region	Date	Format	Label	Ref.
United States	June 1974	Vinyl	MCA Records	
