= Honey on His Hands =

Studio album by Jeanne Pruett
- Released: June 1975
- Recorded: 1974–1975
- Studio: Bradley's Barn, Mount Juliet, Tennessee
- Genre: Country; traditional country
- Length: 29:27
- Label: MCA
- Producer: Walter Haynes

Jeanne Pruett chronology
Jeanne Pruett (1974)	Honey on His Hands (1975)	Encore! (1979)

Singles from Honey on His Hands
- 1. "Welcome to the Sunshine (Sweet Baby Jane)" Released: August 1974; 2. "Just Like Your Daddy" Released: December 1974; 3. "Honey on His Hands" Released: March 1975; 4. "A Poor Man's Woman" Released: July 1975

Honey on His Hands is a studio album by American country music artist Jeanne Pruett. It was released in June 1975 on MCA Records and was produced by Walter Haynes. The album was Pruett's fourth studio release and contained ten tracks previously not released. It would also be her final album release with the MCA label. Honey on His Hands spawned four singles that charted on the Billboard country survey.

== Background and content ==
Honey on His Hands was recorded between 1974 and 1975 at Bradley's Barn, a studio located in Mount Juliet, Tennessee. The sessions were produced by Walter Haynes. He had produced Pruett's previous three album releases on the MCA label. The album was a collection of ten tracks. Four of the album's tracks were written by Pruett herself, including "A Poor Man's Woman". The latter track would later be released as a single. The remainder of the album's material was new songs written by other Nashville songwriters. Other country music composers included on the album were Max D. Barnes, Ben Peters and Troy Seals. Both Barnes and Seals composed the album's title track, which would also be issued as single.

== Release and reception ==
Honey on His Hands was released in June 1975 on MCA Records. It was Pruett's fourth studio album released in her music career. The album was issued as a vinyl record, containing five songs on "side one" and "side two". It spent a total of four weeks on the Billboard Top Country Albums before only reaching a peak position of 48 in August 1975. Despite a low-chart performance the album received a positive response from music critics. Billboard magazine reviewed the album favorably in 1975, praising the title track.

Honey on His Hands would spawn four single released between 1974 and 1975. All the singles issued became minor hits on the country charts. "Welcome to the Sunshine (Sweet Baby Jane)" was the first single issued. Released in August 1974, the song peaked at number 22 on the Billboard Hot Country Singles after 15 weeks. It also peaked at number 24 on the Canadian RPM Country Songs chart. "Just Like Your Daddy" was released in December 1974 as the second single from the album. After spending 15 weeks on the same chart, the song reached number 25 by March 1975. Also in March 1975, the title track was issued as the album's third single. After nine weeks, the song peaked at number 41 on the country songs chart. In July 1975, the final single released was "A Poor Man's Woman". The song peaked at number 24 on the Billboard country singles chart by September. "A Poor Man's Woman" also reached number 46 on the RPM country songs chart in Canada.

== Track listing ==
Side one
No.	Title	Writer(s)	Length
1.	"Honey on His Hands"	Max D. Barnes; Troy Seals	3:12
2.	"A Poor Man's Woman"	Jeanne Pruett	3:32
3.	"Can You Think of Anything Better"	Hal Newman; Pruett; Eddie Thompson	2:32
4.	"But Not Today"	Pruett	2:38
5.	"Momma Let Me Find Shelter (In Your Sweet Lovin' Arms)"	Jay M. Harris; Alice Keister; Bob Morrison	3:09

Side two
No.	Title	Writer(s)	Length
1.	"Just Like Your Daddy"	John Adrian	3:21
2.	"Welcome to the Sunshine (Sweet Baby Jane)"	Ray Willis	3:10
3.	"One of These Days"	Walter Haynes; Pruett	2:27
4.	"My First Pay Day"	Pruett	2:27
5.	"All Over Me"	Ben Peters	2:43

== Personnel ==
All credits are adapted from the liner notes of Honey on His Hands.

Musical personnel

- Brenton Banks – violin
- Ana Barak – viola
- George Binkley – violin
- Harold Bradley – guitar
- Winnie Breast – background vocals
- Marvin Chantry – viola
- Roy Christensen – cello
- Dorothy Deleonibus – background vocals
- Ray Edenton – guitar
- Buddy Emmons – steel guitar
- Carol Gorodetzky – violin
- Lloyd Green – steel guitar
- Buddy Harman – drums
- Herman Harper – background vocals
- Larrie Howard – violin
- The Jordanaires – background vocals
- Martin Katahn – violin
- Millie Kirkham – background vocals
- Sheldon Kurland – violin
- Mike Leech – bass
- Kenny Malone – drums
- Martha McCrory – cello
- Bob Moore – bass
- Laverna Moore – background vocals
- Grady Martin – guitar
- Jeanne Pruett – lead vocals, background vocals
- Bill Purcell – piano
- Hargus "Pig" Robbins – piano
- Jerry Shook – guitar
- Jerry Smith – organ
- Steven Smith – violin
- Henry Strzelecki – bass
- Duane West – background vocals
- Bergen White – background vocals

Technical personnel

- Bobby Bradley – engineering
- Herb Burnette – photography
- Vic Gabany – engineering
- Walter Haynes – producer
- Darrell Johnson – mastering
- Joe Mills – engineering
- Tom Wilkes – photography

== Chart performance ==
Chart (1975)	Peak position
US Top Country Albums (Billboard)	48

== Release history ==
Region	Date	Format	Label	Ref.
United States	June 1975	Vinyl	MCA	
Canada	June 1975	Vinyl	MCA	
