= Pride of America (album) =

Studio album by Charley Pride
- Released: 1974
- Studios: RCA Studio A (Nashville, Tennessee)
- Genre: Country
- Label: RCA Victor
- Producer: Jerry Bradley

Charley Pride chronology
Country Feelin' (1974)	Pride of America (1974)	Charley (1975)

Singles from Pride of America
- 1. "Mississippi Cotton Picking Delta Town" Released: August 1974; 2. "Then Who Am I" Released: November 1974

Professional ratings
Review scores
Source	Rating
AllMusic	2/5 stars
The Encyclopedia of Popular Music	2/5 stars
The New Rolling Stone Record Guide	1/5 stars

Pride of America is the nineteenth studio album by American country music singer Charley Pride. It was released in 1974 on RCA Records.

The album peaked at No. 4 on the Billboard Top Country Albums chart.

== Production ==
The album was recorded at RCA's "Nashville Sound" Studios, Nashville, Tennessee. The vocal accompaniment was by the Jordanaires and the Nashville Edition.

== Critical reception ==
In a retrospective article, Rolling Stone included "Mississippi Cotton Picking Delta Town" on a list of Pride's 10 "essential" songs, writing that "Pride’s delivery perfectly splits the difference between a tender evocation of home and a stark memory of a world he was happy to have left behind."

== Track listing ==
No.	Title	Writer(s)	Length
1.	"Then Who Am I"	A.L. "Doodle" Owens, Dallas Frazier	2:11
2.	"I Still Can't Leave Your Memory Alone"	Geoffrey Morgan, Kent Robbins	2:50
3.	"The Hard Times Will Be the Best Times"	Red Steagall	3:12
4.	"Completely Helpless"	John Schweers	2:27
5.	"Mississippi Cotton Picking Delta Town"	Harold Dorman, Wiley Gann	2:22
6.	"She Loves Me the Way That I Love You"	Bobby Barker	2:21
7.	"Mary Go Round"	Johnny Duncan	2:03
8.	"That Was Forever Ago"	Duncan	2:36
9.	"Thorns of Life"	Paul Huffman, Joane Keller, Bucky Jones	2:18
10.	"North Wind"	Rod Morris	1:50

== Credits ==
- Recording Engineer – Bill Vandevort
- Recording Technicians – Dave Roys and Mike Shockley
- Photography – John Donegan
- Cover Graphics – Herb Burnette, Pinwheel Studios

== Charts ==
Chart (1974)	Peak position
US Top Country Albums	4
