= Encore! (Jeanne Pruett album) =

Studio album by Jeanne Pruett
- Released: October 1979
- Recorded: July 1979
- Studio: Audio Media Studio
- Genre: Country; traditional country
- Length: 30:30
- Label: IBC
- Producer: Walter Haynes

Jeanne Pruett chronology
Honey on His Hands (1975)	Encore! (1979)	Jeanne Pruett (1985)

Singles from Encore!
- 1. "Please Sing Satin Sheets for Me" Released: 1979; 2. "Back to Back" Released: October 1979; 3. "Temporarily Yours" Released: February 1980

Encore! is a studio album by American country music artist Jeanne Pruett. It was released in November 1979 on IBC Records. Encore! was Pruett's fifth studio release in her recording career and was her first to be issued on an independent record label. It was also her first album in four years. The album contained ten tracks and included two singles that became major hits: "Back to Back" and "Temporarily Yours".

== Background and content ==
Encore! was recorded in July 1979 at the Audio Media Studio, located in Nashville, Tennessee. The sessions were produced by Walter Haynes, Pruett's longtime record producer under Decca/MCA Records. At the time, Haynes was the A&R director for the IBC record company. Haynes helped Pruett secure a contract with IBC at the time and with her signing, she became the label's first artist to record an album. The album was a collection of ten tracks. Three of the album's tracks were co-written by Pruett herself. This included the final track, "Please Sing Satin Sheets for Me". The song was a spinoff of Pruett's 1973 signature tune, "Satin Sheets". Other Nashville songwriters were chosen for the project, including Sonny Throckmorton, who wrote four of the album's songs. Also included on the album was a cover of Hank Thompson's "The Wild Side of Life".

== Release and reception ==
Encore! was released in November 1979 on IBC Records. With its release, it became Pruett's first studio album to be issued in four years and her fifth album release overall. It was originally issued as a vinyl LP, containing five songs on each side of the record. Encore! spent a total of 37 weeks on the Billboard Top Country Albums chart before peaking at number 18 in March 1980. With its Billboard appearance, it became Pruett's first charting album since 1975 and her second highest charting album of her recording career. Billboard magazine took notice of Pruett's return to the charts in their October 1979 issue. "It all added up to remarkable comeback by this personable start of IBC Records and the 'Grand Ole Opry'," writers commented.

Encore! produced three singles, two of which became major hits between 1979 and 1980. The single included was "Please Sing Satin Sheets for Me", which was first released in mid 1979. The song spent eight weeks on the Billboard Hot Country Singles before only reaching number 54 in September. "Back to Back" was released as the second single off the album in October 1979. It became Pruett's first top ten hit and first major hit since 1974, climbing to number six on the country chart in February 1980. "Temporarily Yours" was released as the album's third single in February 1980. It became her second major hit off the record and fourth top ten hit when it peaked at number five on the country songs chart in May 1980.

== Track listing ==
Side one
No.	Title	Writer(s)	Length
1.	"Back to Back"	Jerry McBee; Jeanne Pruett	2:43
2.	"Every Now and Then"	Shayne Dolan; Rock Killough	3:03
3.	"Temporarily Yours"	Bobby Fischer; Sonny Throckmorton	3:24
4.	"Star Studded Nights"	Throckmorton	2:24
5.	"Wild Side of Life"	Arlie Carter; William Warren	2:52

Side two
No.	Title	Writer(s)	Length
1.	"Waitin' for the Sun to Shine"	Throckmorton	3:40
2.	"Ain't We Sad Today"	T. Jae Christian	2:23
3.	"Love Is a Fading Rose"	Throckmorton	2:21
4.	"(I'm Gonna) Love the Leavin' All Out of You"	Hilka Maria Cornelius; Pruett	3:35
5.	"Please Sing Satin Sheets for Me"	Pruett; John Volinkaty	3:53

== Personnel ==
All credits are adapted from the liner notes of Encore!.

Musical personnel

- Joe Allen – bass
- Eddie Bayers – drums
- Dennis Burnside – piano
- Jerry Carrigan – drums
- Fred Carter Jr. – rhythm guitar
- Hubert Henry – bass
- Kieran Kane – guitar
- Shane Keischler – keyboards
- The Leah Jane Singers – background vocals
- Weldon Myrick – steel guitar
- Jeanne Pruett – lead vocals, harmony vocals
- Rafe Van Hoy – guitar
- Paul Worley – guitar

Technical personnel

- Dennis Carney – photography
- Walter Haynes – producer
- Joe Johnston – graphics
- Bill Justis – string arrangements
- Marshall Morgan – engineering

== Charts ==
=== Weekly charts ===
Chart (1979–1980)	Peak position
US Top Country Albums (Billboard)	18

=== Year-end charts ===
Chart (1980)	Position
US Top Country Albums (Billboard)	42

== Release history ==
Region	Date	Format	Label	Ref.
Canada	November 1979	Vinyl	Carrousel Records	
United Kingdom	November 1979	Vinyl	RCA Records	
United States	November 1979	Vinyl	IBC Records	
