= Reno Perez =

American singer/songwriter (born 1973)

Reno Pérez
- Born: Rene Perez; 1973 (age 52–53); Corpus Christi, Texas
- Genre: Blues
- Occupation: Singer
- Instruments: Voice, Guitar
- Website: https://www.renoperez.com

Reno Perez (born 1973) is an American singer/songwriter. He recorded three singles while signed to Hacienda Records: "Tejanita", "Mil Anos", and a Spanish-language version of "Brown Eyed Girl". He is now an independent artist.

His father is Tejano Music Hall of Famer Juan Perez. He has shared the stage with country musician Johnny Rodriguez as musical director/lead guitarist, and toured with others like Flaco Jiménez, Merle Haggard, and Ricky Martin. He has opened for many national acts. Perez is resident composer/artist development with, Austin Music Film and Media studios.
