= Lay Down Beside Me =

Single by Don Williams

from the album Expressions
- B-side: "I Would Like to See You Again"
- Released: March 17, 1979
- Genre: Country
- Length: 2:53
- Label: MCA
- Songwriter(s): Don Williams
- Producer(s): Don Williams, Garth Fundis

Don Williams singles chronology
"Tulsa Time" (1978)	"Lay Down Beside Me" (1979)	"It Must Be Love" (1979)

"Lay Down Beside Me" is a song written by American country music artist Don Williams. It was first recorded by Jeanne Pruett on her 1974 self-titled album, and later recorded by Kenny Rogers on his 1977 self-titled album.

Williams later released his own version which was released as the second single from his 1979 album, Expressions. The single reached No. 3 on the Billboard Hot Country Singles & Tracks chart in 1979.

== Charts ==
=== Weekly charts ===
Chart (1979)	Peak position
Australia (Kent Music Report)	88
US Hot Country Songs (Billboard)	3
Canadian RPM Country Tracks	2

=== Year-end charts ===
Chart (1979)	Position
US Hot Country Songs (Billboard)	26
