= You Don't Need to Move a Mountain =

Single by Jeanne Pruett

from the album Jeanne Pruett
- Released: March 1974
- Studio: Bradley's Barn (Mt. Juliet, Tennessee)
- Genre: Country
- Label: MCA
- Songwriter(s): Wayland Holyfield, Jim Rushing
- Producer(s): Walter Haynes

Jeanne Pruett singles chronology
"I'm Your Woman" (1973)	"You Don't Need to Move a Mountain" (1974)	"Welcome to the Sunshine (Sweet Baby Jane)" (1974)

"You Don't Need to Move a Mountain" is a single by American country music artist Jeanne Pruett. Released in March 1974, it was the second single from the album Jeanne Pruett. The song reached #15 on the Billboard Hot Country Singles chart.

== Chart performance ==
Chart (1974)	Peak position
U.S. Billboard Hot Country Singles	15
Canadian RPM Country Tracks	34
