= Jeanne Pruett (1985 album) =

Studio album by Jeanne Pruett
- Released: October 1985
- Recorded: 1985
- Studio: Chelsea Recording Studio
- Genre: Country; traditional country
- Length: 32:53
- Label: Dot; MCA
- Producer: Billy Strange

Jeanne Pruett chronology
Encore! (1979)	Jeanne Pruett (1985)	Satin Sheets: Greatest Hits (1998)

Jeanne Pruett is a studio album by American country music artist Jeanne Pruett. It was released in October 1985 on Dot and MCA Records in October 1985. The project was produced by Billy Strange. The studio album marked Pruett's first full-length studio release in six years. It contained ten tracks, most of which were songs she had not yet recorded.

== Background, content and release ==
In 1985, MCA Records relaunched the dormant Dot label. As part of the company's promotion, several veteran country artists recorded new studio albums to market towards the genre's older demographic. Among the other artists chosen for the project were Asleep at the Wheel, Jan Howard, Justin Tubb, Carl Perkins and Billie Jo Spears. In the album's liner notes, Pruett commented that she was excited to be given the opportunity. She was also excited about the new musical sound crafted by her producer, Billy Strange. Pruett and Strange recorded the project at the Chelsea Studio in Nashville, Tennessee in 1985.

The album was a collection of ten tracks. It included re-recordings of Pruett's two major hits in the 1970s: "Satin Sheets" (1973) and "Back to Back" (1979). Among the album's new tracks was a version of Randy Travis's future hit "I Told You So". The final track on the record, "Rented Room", was written entirely by Pruett.

Jeanne Pruett was released in October 1985 in conjunction with Dot and MCA records. In its original release, the album was issued as a vinyl record, containing five songs on each side of the LP. In 1995, it was reissued as an audio cassette. No singles were originally released from the album. Instead, artists were expected to sell their new releases at their concerts and tours. However, in 1987, a re-recording of "Rented Room" would be released by MSR Records as a single and would peak at number 81 on the Billboard Hot Country Songs chart. It was Pruett's final chart appearance as a recording artist.

== Track listing ==
Side one
No.	Title	Writer(s)	Length
1.	"Satin Sheets"	John Volinkaty	3:40
2.	"I've Been Around Enough to Know"	Dickey Lee; Bob McDill	2:55
3.	"Back to Back"	Jerry McBee; Jeanne Pruett	2:57
4.	"The Best Kept Secret in Town"	Gary Baker; Judy Mehaffey; Kirk Morrison	3:51
5.	"You're All the Man I'll Ever Need"	Lee Dresser	3:16

Side two
No.	Title	Writer(s)	Length
1.	"Let's Fall to Pieces Together"	Lee; Tommy Rocco; Johnny Russell	2:58
2.	"I'll Be in Love"	Jerry Barlow; Dennis Knutson; A.L. "Doodle" Owens	4:10
3.	"Heart First"	Lonnie Wilson; Kim Morrison; Scott Edward Phelps	3:12
4.	"I Told You So"	Randy Travis	4:10
5.	"Rented Room"	Pruett	2:26

== Personnel ==
All credits are adapted from the liner notes of Jeanne Pruett.

Musical personnel

- Jimmy Capps – musician
- Ralph Childs – musician
- Mary Felder – background vocals
- Jerry Knoon – musician
- Terry McMillan – musician
- Kim Morrison – background vocals
- Jeanne Pruett – lead vocals
- Curtis Young – background vocals

Technical personnel

- Chuck Haines – engineering
- Billy Strange – producer

== Release history ==
Region	Date	Format	Label	Ref.
United States	October 1985	Vinyl	Dot Records; MCA Records	
United States	January 1, 1995	Cassette	Dot Records; MCA Records	
United States	2010s	Music download	Geffen Records	
