= Charley (album) =

Studio album by Charley Pride
- Released: May 1975
- Recorded: June 1974
- Studios: RCA Studio A, Nashville, Tennessee
- Genre: Country
- Label: RCA Victor
- Producer: Jack Clement

Charley Pride chronology
Pride of America (1974)	Charley (1975)	The Happiness of Having You (1975)

Singles from Charley
- 1. "I Ain't All Bad" Released: March 1975; 2. "Hope You're Feelin' Me (Like I'm Feelin' You)" Released: July 1975

Charley is the twentieth studio album by American country music artist Charley Pride. It was released in May 1975 via RCA Victor Records and was produced by Jack Clement. The record was Pride's twentieth studio album released in his career and contained a total of ten tracks. The album included two singles which became major hits that year on the country chart: "I Ain't All Bad" and "Hope You're Feelin' Me (Like I'm Feelin' You)."

== Background and content ==
Charley Pride had nearly a decade of country music success by 1975. This included a string of number one hits during this period, including "It's Gonna Take a Little Bit Longer," "She's Too Good to Be True" and "A Shoulder to Cry On." As the decade progressed, his music took more country pop style, which included this album release. Charley was recorded mostly in June 1974 at the RCA Victor Studio, which was located in Nashville, Tennessee. The recording sessions were produced by Jack Clement, Pride's longtime RCA record producer. The album contained a total of ten tracks. It contained a cover version of "She's as Close as I Can Get to Loving You," which was originally a minor hit for Hank Locklin in 1971. It also included "Lovin' Understandin' Man," which was also cut by Don Williams around the same time. The project also contained two tracks written by Johnny Duncan and one track written by Gary Stewart.

== Release and reception ==
Professional ratings
Review scores
Source	Rating
AllMusic	2/5 stars

Charley was released on RCA Victor Records in May 1975. It was his twentieth studio recording released in his career. The album was originally distributed as a vinyl LP, with five songs on each side of the record. In the 2010s, it was re-released in a digital format to streaming services, such as Apple Music. It spent a total of 20 weeks on the Billboard Top Country Albums and peaked at number five in September.

Charley contained two singles which became top ten hits that year on the Billboard country chart. The first was "I Ain't All Bad," which was issued on RCA Victor in March 1975. The song peaked at number six on the Hot Country Songs chart by June 1975. It also reached number one on the RPM Country Singles chart in Canada. The second single released off the album was "Hope You're Feelin' Me (Like I'm Feelin' You)," which was issued in July 1975. By October of that year, it reached number one on the Billboard Hot Country Singles chart. It also became a top ten hit in Canada. Charley was only given a rating of two stars from Allmusic.

== Track listing ==
=== Vinyl version ===
Side one
No.	Title	Writer(s)	Length
1.	"Hope You're Feelin' Me (Like I'm Feelin' You)"	Bobby David; Jim Rushing	2:59
2.	"Searching for the Morning Sun"	Paul Gibbons; Jerry Grindele; Tony Hatch	2:21
3.	"The Hardest Part of Livin's Lovin' Me"	Don Feagin	1:48
4.	"Now and Then"	Jerry Foster; Bill Rice	2:29
5.	"Fools"	Johnny Duncan	2:29

Side two
No.	Title	Writer(s)	Length
1.	"I Ain't All Bad"	Duncan	2:53
2.	"She's as Close as I Can Get to Loving You"	Dallas Frazier; Arthur Leo Owens	2:42
3.	"One Mile More"	Anne Monkhouse	1:54
4.	"You're the Woman Behind Everything"	Gary Stewart	2:12
5.	"Lovin' Understandin' Man"	Rushing	2:13

=== Digital version ===
Charley
No.	Title	Writer(s)	Length
1.	"Hope You're Feelin' Me (Like I'm Feelin' You)"	David; Rushing	3:00
2.	"Searching for the Morning Sun"	Gibbons; Grindele; Hatch	2:24
3.	"The Hardest Part of Livin's Lovin' Me"	Feagin	1:50
4.	"Now and Then"	Foster; Rice	2:30
5.	"Fools"	Duncan	2:31
6.	"I Ain't All Bad"	Duncan	2:54
7.	"She's as Close as I Can Get to Loving You"	Frazier; Owens	2:43
8.	"One Mile More"	Monkhouse	1:56
9.	"You're the Woman Behind Everything"	Stewart	2:12
10.	"Lovin' Understandin' Man"	Rushing	2:16

== Personnel ==
All credits are adapted from the liner notes of Charley.

Musical personnel

- David Briggs – piano, keyboards
- Jimmy Capps – guitar
- Johnny Gimble – fiddle
- Lloyd Green – steel guitar
- Buddy Harman – drums
- The Jordanaires – background vocals
- Charlie McCoy – harmonica
- The Nashville Edition – background vocals
- Charley Pride – lead vocals
- Hargus "Pig" Robbins – piano
- Hal Rugg – steel guitar
- Dale Sellers – guitar
- Jerry Shook – guitar
- Bobby Thompson – banjo, guitar
- Tommy Williams – fiddle
- Chip Young – guitar

Technical personnel

- Herb Burnette – art direction
- Jack Clement – producer
- John Donegan – photography
- David Roys – technician
- Roy Shockley – technician
- Bill Vandevort – engineering

== Chart performance ==
Chart (1975)	Peak position
US Top Country Albums (Billboard)	5

== Release history ==
Region	Date	Format	Label	Ref.
Australia	May 1975	Vinyl	RCA Victor Records	
United Kingdom	May 1975	Vinyl	RCA Victor Records	
United States	May 1975	Vinyl	RCA Victor Records	
United States	2010s	Sony Music Entertainment	Digital; streaming	
