= It's Too Late to Love Me Now =

Song

Single by Charly McClain

from the album Here's Charly McClain
- B-side: "You Can Love It Away"
- Released: April 1977
- Recorded: November 1976; Memphis, Tennessee, U.S., Nashville, Tennessee, U.S.
- Genre: Country
- Label: Epic
- Songwriters: Gene Dobbins; Rory Bourke; Johnny Wilson

Charly McClain singles chronology
"Lay Something on My Bed, Besides a Blanket" (1977)	"It's Too Late to Love Me Now" (1977)	"Make the World Go Away" (1977)

"It's Too Late to Love Me Now" is a song written by Gene Dobbins, Rory Bourke, and Johnny Wilson. Since its composition, the song has been covered as a single by various artists from the country and pop musical genres. It was first released as a single by country artist, Charly McClain in 1977.

"It's Too Late to Love Me Now" has also been featured on albums by various country recording artists, beginning with Dolly Parton on her 1978 release, Heartbreaker. "It's Too Late" has also been featured on albums by Cher, Lorrie Morgan, Loretta Lynn, and Dottie West.

== Charly McClain version ==
"It's Too Late" was first released as a single by American country artist, Charly McClain. Released in April 1977, the song peaked at number eighty seven on the Billboard Magazine Hot Country Singles chart. It was the third and final single from McClain's debut album, Here's Charly McClain.

The song was the first of many singles McClain would release. It would also be the first of a series of recordings McClain would make for the Epic record label in Nashville, Tennessee. She would go on to have a series of major country hits in the 1980s, including "Who's Cheatin' Who" and "Radio Heart".

=== Chart performance ===
Chart (1977)	Peak position
US Hot Country Songs (Billboard)	87

== Cher version ==
"It's Too Late (to Love Me Now)"

Single by Cher

from the album Take Me Home
- B-side: "Shoppin'"
- Released: May 21, 1979
- Recorded: 1978
- Genre: Pop; country
- Length: 3:39
- Label: Casablanca
- Songwriters: Gene Dobbins; Rory Bourke; Johnny Wilson
- Producer: Ron Dante

Cher singles chronology
"Wasn't It Good" (1979)	"It's Too Late (to Love Me Now)" (1979)	"Hell on Wheels" (1979)

In 1979, American pop artist Cher released a cover version of the song and retitled it as "It's too Late (to Love Me Now)". It was issued as the third single from her fifteenth album Take Me Home in 1979. The song was originally released as a seven- and twelve-inch single respectfully in an LP format. To date, the song is Cher's only major release to country radio.

"It's Too Late (to Love Me Now)" record was a minor hit on the Billboard Hot Country Singles chart, peaking at number eighty seven. This was the same peaking chart position that McClain had with her original 1977 version of the song. The song would be one of Cher's last single releases of the decade.

=== Chart performance ===
Chart (1979)	Peak position
US Hot Country Songs (Billboard)	87

== Jeanne Pruett version ==
"It's Too Late"

Single by Jeanne Pruett
- B-side: "I Can't Feel at Home"
- Released: June 1980
- Recorded: May 1980; Nashville, Tennessee, U.S.
- Genre: Country
- Label: IBC
- Songwriters: Gene Dobbins; Rory Bourke; Johnny Wilson
- Producer: Walter Haynes

Jeanne Pruett singles chronology
"Temporarily Yours" (1980)	"It's Too Late" (1980)	"Sad Old Shade of Glory" (1981)

In 1980, American country artist Jeanne Pruett released a cover version of the song and titled it as, "It's Too Late". Issued as a single in June 1980, "It's Too Late" peaked at number nine on the Billboard Hot Country Singles chart. Initially not released onto an album, a live version of "It's Too Late" was eventually issued on Pruett's 1983 effort entitled, Music Row.

The song became Pruett's third top ten single in a row on the Billboard country chart. Additionally, "It's Too Late" would become Pruett's final top ten single (and final major hit) on any Billboard singles chart. To date, Pruett's cover of the song is the most successful version.

=== Chart performance ===
Chart (1980)	Peak position
US Hot Country Songs (Billboard)	9
