= Mississippi Cotton Picking Delta Town =

Single by Charley Pride

from the album Pride of America
- B-side: "Mary Go Round"
- Released: August 1974
- Genre: Country
- Label: RCA
- Songwriter(s): Harold Dorman; George Gann
- Producer(s): Jerry Bradley

Charley Pride singles chronology
| "We Could" (1974) | "Mississippi Cotton Picking Delta Town" (1974) | "Then Who Am I" (1974) |

"Mississippi Cotton Picking Delta Town" is a song written by Harold Dorman and George Gann, and recorded by American country music artist Charley Pride. It was released in August 1974 as the first single from his album Pride of America. The song peaked at number 3 on the Billboard Hot Country Singles chart. It also reached number 1 on the RPM Country Tracks chart in Canada.

== Chart performance ==
| Chart (1974) | Peak position |
|---|---|
| US Hot Country Songs (Billboard) | 3 |
| US Billboard Hot 100 | 70 |
| Canadian RPM Country Tracks | 1 |
