= I'm Your Woman (song) =

Single by Jeanne Pruett

from the album Jeanne Pruett
- Released: August 1973
- Studio: Bradley's Barn (Mt. Juliet, Tennessee)
- Genre: Country
- Label: MCA
- Songwriter(s): Don W. Johnson
- Producer(s): Walter Haynes

Jeanne Pruett singles chronology
"Satin Sheets" (1973)	"I'm Your Woman" (1973)	"You Don't Need to Move a Mountain" (1974)

"I'm Your Woman" is a single by American country music artist Jeanne Pruett. Released in August 1973, it was the first single from the album Jeanne Pruett. The song reached #8 on the Billboard Hot Country Singles chart.

== Chart performance ==
Chart (1973)	Peak position
U.S. Billboard Hot Country Singles	8
Canadian RPM Country Tracks	8
