= Generations in Song =

Studio album by Hank Locklin
- Released: 2001; 2004
- Studio: Legends Studio
- Genre: Country; traditional country
- Label: Coldwater; Slewfoot
- Producer: Hank Adam Locklin

Hank Locklin chronology
All Kinds of Everything (1979)	Generations in Song (00000001)	By the Grace of God: The Gospel Album (2006)

Generations in Song
- Re-release cover from 2004.

Generations in Song is a studio album by American country singer–songwriter Hank Locklin. It was originally released in 2001 on the Coldwater label and re-released in 2006 on the Slewfoot label. The album originally contained 19 tracks of solo cuts and duets with fellow country artists, including Dolly Parton, Vince Gill and Jeannie Seely. It was Locklin's first album in many years and was the twenty eighth studio project of his career. The album received positive reviews from critics following its release.

== Background ==
Hank Locklin had his greatest commercial success during the 1950s and 1960s with several well-known songs like "Send Me the Pillow You Dream On," "Geisha Girl" and "Please Help Me, I'm Falling." The songs became major hits on the country charts after being released as singles and made Locklin internationally successful. After leaving his long-time record label, Locklin recorded for several small labels during the 1970s. In the decades that followed, Locklin took a recording hiatus, mostly due to a blood cell disease that forced him to receive regular transfusions. His son, Hank Adam Locklin, encouraged his father to return to the recording studio. Originally, Generations in Song was planned to be sold on television, however the plan did not materialize. Instead, the Locklin's bought out the album and recorded it themselves.

== Content and recording ==
Generations in Song was a collection of 12 duets recorded with fellow country artists. Among the artists chosen was Vince Gill, who performed "Danny Boy" alongside Locklin in a tenor harmony. Dolly Parton performed with Locklin on a remake of his hit "Send Me the Pillow That You Dream On". Also featured performing duets alongside Locklin are fellow country performers Jan Howard, Jeanne Pruett, Jeannie Seely and Hank Adam Locklin. The album's material is mostly cover versions of previously recorded country songs, such as "Hey Good Lookin'" and "Almost Persuaded." The album itself was produced by Hank Adam Locklin at the Legends Studio, located in Nashville, Tennessee. To help revive the "classic" sound found on Locklin's early records, session musicians from his original 1960s LP's were chosen for the project. This included Hargus "Pig" Robbins on piano and Harold Bradley on guitar.

== Release and critical reception ==
Professional ratings
Review scores
Source	Rating
Allmusic	4/5 stars

Generations in Song was first released on Coldwater Records in 2001. It was originally offered as a compact disc and contained 19 tracks in its original release. On February 10, 2004, the album was re-released on Slewfoot Records in a compact disc format again. However, only 12 tracks were included on the re-release. The album cover was also changed for the re-release of the project. Locklin and his son bought advertisement time on the Grand Ole Opry to help promote the record, making him the first country artist to do so.

The project received positive reviews from critics following its release. Bruce Eder of AllMusic gave Generations in Song a four-star rating in his review, calling it a "killer album". Eder was impressed by Locklin's youthful-sounding voice, commenting, "His voice sounds at least three decades fresher than it has a right to, and the harmonizing and the playing are first-rate, along with the arrangements, which makes this more than an exercise in nostalgia." Tom Netherland had a similar observation in his review of the album for Country Standard Time. "Locklin's 83 years old and still singing in the same keys he did 50 years ago, back when he was first gaining national notice," he stated.

Meanwhile, No Depression praised the album for its duet partnerships, calling Dolly Parton's harmony "charming". The magazine concluded by discussing the album's liner notes: "In the liner notes, he writes, 'Sing along if you want to, ’cause the louder you sing, the better I’ll sound!' Given the caliber of the artist and the musicians, that seems unlikely."

== Track listing ==
=== Original release ===
Generations in Song
No.	Title	Writer(s)	Artists performing	Length
1.	"Between the Tears"	A.L. Owens; Gene Vowel	Hank Locklin	3:21
2.	"Country Honey"	Dallas Frazier; Owens	Hank Locklin	2:58
3.	"Send Me the Pillow You Dream On"	Hank Locklin	Dolly Parton; Hank Locklin	2:36
4.	"Danny Boy"	Frederic Weatherly	Vince Gill; Hank Locklin	3:11
5.	"Flying South"	Cindy Walker	Hank Locklin
6.	"Almost Persuaded"	Billy Sherrill; Glenn Sutton	Hank Locklin	3:24
7.	"Anna"	Hank Locklin	Jan Howard; Hank Locklin	4:17
8.	"Ain't You Even Gonna Cry"	Johnny Russell	Jeannie Seely; Hank Locklin	3:13
9.	"Hot Pepper Doll"	Cy Coben	Hank Adam Locklin; Hank Locklin
10.	"Happy Face"	Becki Bluefield	Hank Adam Locklin; Hank Locklin
11.	"Please Help Me, I'm Falling"	Hal Blair; Don Robertson	Hank Locklin
12.	"Grow Old Beside Me"	Locklin	Jeanne Pruett; Hank Locklin	3:24
13.	"Loving Arms"	Walker	Hank Locklin
14.	"Let Me the One"	Paul Blevins; Joe Hobson; W.S. Stevenson	Hank Locklin	2:46
15.	"Hey Good Lookin'"	Hank Williams	Jett Williams; Hank Locklin	2:18
16.	"We're Gonna Go Fishing"	Tex Atchinson	Brandt Locklin; Tessa Locklin; Hank Adam Locklin; Hank Locklin	2:29
17.	"Precious Love"		Hank Adam Locklin; Hank Locklin
18.	"Still Hangs Around My Heart"		Brett Brown; Hank Adam Locklin; Hank Locklin
19.	"Love Must Be Gone"	Locklin	Hank Locklin	4:04

=== Re-release ===
Generations in Song
No.	Title	Writer(s)	Artists performing	Length
1.	"Send Me the Pillow You Dream On"	Hank Locklin	Dolly Parton; Hank Locklin	2:36
2.	"Between the Tears"	Owens; Gene Vowel	Hank Locklin	3:21
3.	"Hey Good Lookin'"	H. Williams	Jett Williams; Hank Locklin	2:18
4.	"Danny Boy"	Weatherly	Vince Gill; Hank Locklin	3:11
5.	"Almost Persuaded"	Sherrill; Sutton	Hank Locklin	3:24
6.	"Country Honey"	Frazier; Owens	Hank Locklin	2:58
7.	"Grow Old Beside Me"	Locklin	Jeanne Pruett; Hank Locklin	3:24
8.	"Anna"	Locklin	Jan Howard; Hank Locklin	4:17
9.	"Love Must Be Gone"	Locklin	Hank Locklin	4:04
10.	"We're Gonna Go Fishing"	Atchinson	Brandt Locklin; Tessa Locklin; Hank Adam Locklin; Hank Locklin	2:29
11.	"Ain't You Even Gonna Cry"	Johnny Russell	Jeannie Seely; Hank Locklin	3:13
12.	"Let Me the One"	Blevins; Hobson; Stevenson	Hank Locklin	2:46

== Personnel ==
All credits are adapted from the liner notes of Generations in Song and AllMusic.

Musical personnel

- Harold Bradley – Guitar
- Jimmy Capps – Guitar
- Vinnie Ciesielski – Horn
- Charlie Cushman – Banjo
- Vince Gill – Guest artist
- Buddy Harman – Drums, percussion
- Herbert Hester – Fiddle, Mandolin, Rhythm guitar
- Jan Howard – Guest artist
- The Carol Lee Singers – Background vocals
- Billy Linneman – Upright bass
- Brandt Locklin – Guest Artist
- Hank Adam Locklin – Guest artist
- Hank Locklin – Lead vocals
- Charlie McCoy – Harmonica
- Weldon Myrick – Steel guitar
- Dolly Parton – Guest artist
- Jeanne Pruett – Guest artist
- Leon Rhodes – Bass, rhythm guitar
- Hargus "Pig" Robbins – Piano

Technical personnel

- Lou Bradley – Engineer
- Hollis Flatt – Mastering
- Merle Haggard – Quotes researched and compiled
- Hank Adam Locklin – Producer
- Jimmy Nichols – Arrangement

== Release history ==
Region	Date	Format	Label	Ref.
United States	2001	Compact disc	Coldwater Records	
United States	February 10, 2004	Compact disc	Slewfoot Records	
