= Dance with Me (Just One More Time) =

Single by Johnny Rodriguez

from the album My Third Album
- B-side: "Faded Love"
- Released: June 1974
- Genre: Country
- Label: Mercury
- Songwriter(s): Johnny Rodriguez

Johnny Rodriguez singles chronology
"Something" (1974)	"Dance with Me (Just One More Time)" (1974)	"We're Over" (1974)

"Dance with Me (Just One More Time)" is a single by American country music artist Johnny Rodriguez. Released in June 1974, it was the second single from his album My Third Album. The song peaked at number two on the Billboard Hot Country Singles chart. It also reached number one on the RPM Country Tracks chart in Canada.
