= Back to Back (Jeanne Pruett song) =

Single by Jeanne Pruett

from the album Encore!
- Released: October 1979
- Genre: Country
- Length: 2:43
- Label: IBC
- Songwriters: Jerry McBee, Jeanne Pruett
- Producer: Walter Haynes

Jeanne Pruett singles chronology
"Please Sing Satin Sheets for Me" (1979)	"Back to Back" (1979)	"Temporarily Yours" (1980)

"Back to Back" is a single co-written and recorded by American country music artist Jeanne Pruett. Released in October 1979, it was the second single from the album Encore!. The song reached #6 on the Billboard Hot Country Singles chart in 1980, becoming her first Top Ten single on that chart since 1973's "I'm Your Woman".

== Charts ==
=== Weekly charts ===
Chart (1979–1980)	Peak position
US Hot Country Songs (Billboard)	6

=== Year-end charts ===
Chart (1980)	Position
US Hot Country Songs (Billboard)	49
