= Harold Dorman =

American singer-songwriter (1926–1988)

Harold Kenneth Dorman (December 23, 1931 – October 8, 1988) was an American rock and roll singer and songwriter.

== Biography ==
Dorman was born in Drew, Mississippi. He wrote a song called "Mountain of Love", which he released as a single in 1960 on the Rita record label. The song became a hit in the U.S., selling over a million copies and reaching No. 7 on the Billboard R&B singles chart and No. 21 on the Billboard Hot 100. Though it was Dorman's only hit record, it proved to be a popular song for covers; Charley Pride, Johnny Rivers, and Ronnie Dove all hit the U.S. chart with the song, and it was also recorded by Bruce Springsteen, The Beach Boys, Tommy Cash, and Narvel Felts.

Dorman also co-wrote a #3 country hit for Pride, Mississippi Cotton Picking Delta Town and three songs for country music and blues singer pianist Moon Mullican in the early 1960s. These songs are the blues song "Mr Tears", the honky tonk ballad "Just to be With You" and the bluesy country drinking song "This Glass I Hold".

Dorman died in October 1988 in Memphis, Tennessee, at the age of 56.

Bear Family Records posthumously reissued an album of Dorman's recordings in 1999.
