= I Ain't All Bad =

Single by Charley Pride

from the album Charley
- B-side: "Hard Times Will Be the Best Times"
- Released: March 1975
- Genre: Country
- Label: RCA
- Songwriter(s): Johnny Duncan
- Producer(s): Jack Clement

Charley Pride singles chronology
"Then Who Am I" (1974)	"I Ain't All Bad" (1975)	"Hope You're Feelin' Me (Like I'm Feelin' You)" (1975)

"I Ain't All Bad" is a song written by Johnny Duncan, and recorded by American country music artist Charley Pride. It was released in March 1975 as the first single from his album Charley. The song peaked at number 6 on the Billboard Hot Country Singles chart. It also reached number 1 on the RPM Country Tracks chart in Canada.

== Chart performance ==
Chart (1975)	Peak position
US Hot Country Songs (Billboard)	6
US Bubbling Under Hot 100 Singles (Billboard)	1
Canadian RPM Country Tracks	1
