= Hope You're Feelin' Me (Like I'm Feelin' You) =

Single by Charley Pride

from the album Charley
- B-side: "Searchin' for the Morning Sun"
- Released: July 1975
- Genre: Country
- Length: 3:02
- Label: RCA
- Songwriter(s): Bobby David; Jim Rushing
- Producer(s): Jack Clement

Charley Pride singles chronology
"I Ain't All Bad" (1975)	"Hope You're Feelin' Me (Like I'm Feelin' You)" (1975)	"The Happiness of Having You" (1975)

"Hope You're Feelin' Me (Like I'm Feelin' You)" is a song written by Bobby David and Jim Rushing, and recorded by American country music artist Charley Pride. It was released in July 1975 as the second single from the album Charley. The song was Pride's fifteenth number one on the country chart. The single stayed at number one for one week and spent a total of eleven weeks on the country chart.

== Charts ==
=== Weekly charts ===
Chart (1975)	Peak position
US Hot Country Songs (Billboard)	1
Canadian RPM Country Tracks	2

=== Year-end charts ===
Chart (1975)	Position
US Hot Country Songs (Billboard)	37
