= The Happiness of Having You (song) =

Single by Charley Pride

from the album The Happiness of Having You
- B-side: "Right Back Missing You Again"
- Released: November 1975
- Genre: Country
- Label: RCA
- Songwriter(s): Ted Harris
- Producer(s): Jerry Bradley

Charley Pride singles chronology
"Hope You're Feelin' Me (Like I'm Feelin' You)" (1975)	"The Happiness of Having You" (1975)	"My Eyes Can Only See as Far as You" (1976)

"The Happiness of Having You" is a song written by Ted Harris, and recorded by American country music artist Charley Pride. It was released in November 1975 as the first single and title track from his album The Happiness of Having You. The song peaked at number 3 on the Billboard Hot Country Singles chart. It also reached number 1 on the RPM Country Tracks chart in Canada.

== Chart performance ==
Chart (1975–1976)	Peak position
US Hot Country Songs (Billboard)	3
Canadian RPM Country Tracks	1
