= My Eyes Can Only See as Far as You =

Single by Charley Pride

from the album The Happiness of Having You
- B-side: "Oklahoma Morning"
- Released: February 1976
- Genre: Country
- Length: 2:37
- Label: RCA
- Songwriter(s): Naomi Martin; Jimmy Payne
- Producer(s): Jerry Bradley

Charley Pride singles chronology
| "The Happiness of Having You" (1975) | "My Eyes Can Only See as Far as You" (1976) | "A Whole Lotta Things to Sing About" (1976) |

"My Eyes Can Only See as Far as You" is a song written by Naomi Martin and Jimmy Payne, and recorded by American country music artist Charley Pride. It was released in February 1976 as the second single from the album The Happiness of Having You. The song was Pride's sixteenth number one song on the country charts. The single stayed at number one for a single week and spent a total of ten weeks on the country chart.

== Charts ==
=== Weekly charts ===
| Chart (1976) | Peak position |
|---|---|
| US Hot Country Songs (Billboard) | 1 |
| Canadian RPM Country Tracks | 1 |

=== Year-end charts ===
| Chart (1976) | Position |
|---|---|
| US Hot Country Songs (Billboard) | 35 |
