= We're Over =

Single by Johnny Rodriguez

from the album Songs About Ladies and Love
- B-side: "Oh I Miss You"
- Released: September 1974
- Genre: Country
- Label: Mercury
- Songwriter(s): Barry Mann, Cynthia Weil

Johnny Rodriguez singles chronology
"Dance with Me (Just One More Time)" (1974)	"We're Over" (1974)	"I Just Can't Get Her Out of My Mind" (1975)

"We're Over" is a song written by Barry Mann and Cynthia Weil, and originally recorded by B. J. Thomas in 1973. American country music artist Johnny Rodriguez released his recording version in September 1974 as the first single from his album Songs About Ladies and Love. The song peaked at number 3 on the Billboard Hot Country Singles chart. It also reached number 1 on the RPM Country Tracks chart in Canada.

== Cover versions ==
- 1975: Glen Campbell covered the song on his 1975 Rhinestone Cowboy album.
- 1980: Demis Roussos on his album Man of the World

== Chart performance ==
Chart (1974–1975)	Peak position
U.S. Billboard Hot Country Singles	3
Canadian RPM Country Tracks	1
