= The Happiness of Having You (album) =

Studio album by Charley Pride
- Released: November 1975
- Recorded: August 1975
- Studio: RCA Studio A, Nashville, Tennessee
- Genre: Country
- Label: RCA Victor
- Producer: Jerry Bradley

Charley Pride chronology
Charley (1975)	The Happiness of Having You (1975)	Sunday Morning with Charley Pride (1976)

Singles from The Happiness of Having You
- 1. "The Happiness of Having You" Released: November 1975; 2. "My Eyes Can Only See as Far as You" Released: February 1976

The Happiness of Having You is the twenty-first studio album by American country music artist Charley Pride. It was released in November 1975 via RCA Victor Records and was produced by Jerry Bradley. It was Pride's twenty first studio recording released in his music career and contained ten tracks. The album included two singles which became major hits on the country charts: "My Eyes Can Only See as Far as You" and the title track.

== Background and content ==
Charley Pride had nearly a decade of country music success by 1975. This included a string of number one hits during this period, including "It's Gonna Take a Little Bit Longer", "She's Too Good to Be True" and "A Shoulder to Cry On". As the decade progressed, his music took a more country pop style, which included this album. The Happiness of Having You was recorded at the RCA Victor Studio in August 1975. The sessions were produced by Jerry Bradley. The record consisted of ten tracks. Most of the album's material was new music composed by songwriters such as Johnny Duncan, Ben Peters and Kenny O'Dell. Also included on the LP was a cover of Kris Kristofferson's "Help Me Make It Through the Night".

== Release and chart performance ==
The Happiness of Having You was released in November 1975 via RCA Victor Records. The project marked Pride's twenty first studio album. It was also Pride's second studio album released in 1975. The project was originally distributed as a vinyl LP, containing five songs on both sides of the record. It was also simultaneously issued as a cassette with a nearly identical track listing. In later years it would issued digitally for music downloads and for streaming purposes, including Apple Music. The Happiness of Having You spent a total of 22 weeks on the Billboard Top Country Albums chart. In February 1976, it peaked at number two on the chart. The album's title track was released as the lead single in November 1975. It became a major country hit after peaking at number three on the Billboard Hot Country Songs chart in January 1976. "My Eyes Can Only See as Far as You" was spawned as the album's second single in February 1976. Spending 14 weeks on the same chart, it peaked at number one in May 1976. Both singles would also reach number one on the RPM Country Singles chart in Canada.

== Track listings ==
=== Vinyl version ===
Side one
No.	Title	Writer(s)	Length
1.	"The Happiness of Having You"	Ted Harris	2:16
2.	"I Can't Keep My Hands Off of You"	Bobby Borchers; Mack Vickery	3:09
3.	"Everything I Am"	Kenny O'Dell	3:16
4.	"My Eyes Can Only See as Far as You"	Naomi Martin; Jimmy Payne	2:37
5.	"I've Got a Woman to Lean On"	Jim Owen	2:21

Side two
No.	Title	Writer(s)	Length
1.	"Right Back Missing You Again"	Johnny Duncan	2:51
2.	"Help Me Make It Through the Night"	Kris Kristofferson	2:28
3.	"Oklahoma Morning"	Jerry Chesnut	2:21
4.	"Everything She Touches Turns to Love"	Shirley Ann Worth	3:00
5.	"Signs of Love"	Ben Peters	2:26

=== Cassette version ===
Side one
No.	Title	Writer(s)	Length
1.	"The Happiness of Having You"	Ted Harris	2:16
2.	"I Can't Keep My Hands Off of You"	Borchers; Vickery	3:09
3.	"Everything I Am"	O'Dell	3:16
4.	"Oklahoma Morning"	Chesnut	2:21
5.	"I've Got a Woman to Lean On"	Jim Owen	2:21

Side two
No.	Title	Writer(s)	Length
1.	"Right Back Missing You Again"	Duncan	2:51
2.	"Help Me Make It Through the Night"	Kristofferson	2:28
3.	"My Eyes Can Only See as Far as You"	Martin; Payne	2:37
4.	"Everything She Touches Turns to Love"	Shirley Ann Worth	3:00
5.	"Signs of Love"	Peters	2:26

=== Digital version ===
The Happiness of Having You
No.	Title	Writer(s)	Length
1.	"The Happiness of Having You"	Ted Harris	2:20
2.	"I Can't Keep My Hands Off of You"	Borchers; Vickery	3:11
3.	"Everything I Am"	O'Dell	3:17
4.	"My Eyes Can Only See as Far as You"	Martin; Payne	2:40
5.	"I've Got a Woman to Lean On"	Owen	2:25
6.	"Right Back Missing You Again"	Duncan	2:54
7.	"Help Me Make It Through the Night"	Kristofferson	2:29
8.	"Oklahoma Morning"	Chesnut	2:23
9.	"Everything She Touches Turns to Love"	Worth	3:01
10.	"Signs of Love"	Peters	2:31

== Personnel ==
All credits are adapted from the liner notes of The Happiness of Having You.

Musical personnel

- Hayward Bishop – drums
- Harold Bradley – guitar
- David Briggs – piano
- Pete Drake – steel guitar
- Johnny Gimble – fiddle
- The Jordanaires – background vocals
- The Sheldon Kurland Strings – string instruments
- Mike Leach – bass
- Charlie McCoy – harmonica
- The Nashville Edition – background vocals
- Charley Pride – lead vocals
- Hal Rugg – steel guitar
- Dale Sellers – guitar
- Bobby Thompson – banjo
- Pete Wade – guitar
- Tommy Williams – fiddle
- Chip Young – guitar
- Reggie Young – guitar

Technical personnel

- Jerry Bradley – producer
- Herb Burnette – art direction
- John Donegan – photography
- Bill Harris – recording engineer
- Al Pachucki – recording engineer
- Tom Pick – recording engineer
- David Roys – recording technician
- Chuck Seitz – recording technician
- Mike Shockley – recording technician
- Roy Shockley – recording technician
- Pinwheel Studios – art direction
- Bill Vandevort – recording engineer

== Chart performance ==
Chart (1975–76)	Peak position
US Top Country Albums (Billboard)	2

== Release history ==
Region	Date	Format	Label	Ref.
Japan	November 1975	Vinyl	RCA Victor Records	
United States	November 1975	Vinyl	RCA Victor Records	
United States	November 1975	Cassette	RCA Victor Records	
United States	2010s	Sony Music Entertainment	Digital; streaming	
