= Love Put a Song in My Heart (song) =

Single by Johnny Rodriguez

from the album Love Put a Song in My Heart
- B-side: "Steppin' Out on You"
- Released: September 1975
- Recorded: 1975
- Genre: Country
- Length: 2:45
- Label: Mercury
- Songwriter(s): Ben Peters
- Producer(s): Jerry Kennedy

Johnny Rodriguez singles chronology
"Just Get Up and Close the Door" (1975)	"Love Put a Song in My Heart" (1975)	"I Couldn't Be Me Without You" (1976)

"Love Put a Song in My Heart" is a song written by Ben Peters, and recorded by American country music artist Johnny Rodriguez.

== Background ==
"Love Put a Song in My Heart" was released in September 1975 as the first single and title track from the album Love Put a Song in My Heart. Rodriguez's version includes a Spanish translation of the refrain after a key change.

== Chart performance ==
The song was the last of six number ones on the country chart for Rodriguez. The single stayed at number one for one week and spent a total of eleven weeks on the country chart.

Chart (1975)	Peak position
US Hot Country Songs (Billboard)	1
Canadian RPM Country Tracks	3
