= I Just Can't Get Her Out of My Mind =

Single by Johnny Rodriguez

from the album Songs About Ladies and Love
- B-side: "Have I Told You Lately That I Love You"
- Released: January 1975
- Genre: Country
- Label: Mercury
- Songwriter(s): Larry Gatlin
- Producer(s): Jerry Kennedy

Johnny Rodriguez singles chronology
"We're Over" (1974)	"I Just Can't Get Her Out of My Mind" (1975)	"Just Get Up and Close the Door" (1975)

"I Just Can't Get Her Out of My Mind" is a song written by Larry Gatlin, and recorded by American country music artist Johnny Rodriguez. It was released in January 1975 as the second single from the album Song About Ladies and Love. The song was Rodriguez's fourth number one on the country chart. The single stayed at number one for one week and spend a total of nine weeks on the country charts.

== Chart performance ==
Chart (1975)	Peak position
US Hot Country Songs (Billboard)	1
Canadian RPM Country Tracks	3
