= Satin Sheets =

Studio album by Jeanne Pruett
- Released: June 1973
- Recorded: December 1972 – June 1973
- Studio: Bradley's Barn, Mount Juliet, Tennessee
- Genre: Country
- Label: MCA
- Producer: Walter Haynes

Jeanne Pruett chronology
Love Me (1972)	Satin Sheets (1973)	Jeanne Pruett (1974)

Singles from Satin Sheets
- 1. "Satin Sheets" Released: February 1973

Satin Sheets is the second studio album released by American country artist Jeanne Pruett. The album was released in June 1973 on MCA Records and was produced by Walter Haynes. The album contained Pruett's first major hit and signature song of the same name as the album. The single reached number one on the Billboard Country Chart. The album was released in late spring 1973.

== Background and content ==
Satin Sheets contained ten tracks of newly recorded material. The album was recorded in three separate sessions at Bradley's Barn studio in Mount Juliet, Tennessee. The first session took place in December 1972, which recorded the title track and "Sweet Sweetheart". In January 1973, "Ive Been Wrong for So Long" and "Lonely Women Cryin" were recorded. The final songs were recorded in a session that took place in April 1973. Most of the songs on the album were aimed more towards a traditional country style, unlike the conventional Nashville Sound musical style used at the time on most country music sessions. This was seen particularly on songs such as the title track and "Walking Piece of Heaven". Many of the songs consisted of themes about passion and romance, including the title track, "Is Her Love Any Better Than Mine" and "Your Memory's Comin' On" in a country pop and traditional country style. The album was later reviewed by Allmusic which gave it three out of five stars.

Satin Sheets was originally released as the lead and title track of an LP record which comprised 11 songs. The album has never been issued on conventional compact disc but has been available on CreateSpace recordable audio CD since April 16, 2012.

== Release ==
Satin Sheets' name derived from the album's title track, which was the lead single and only single released from the album. The single released in February 1973, becoming Pruett's first major hit, peaking at number one on the Billboard Magazine Hot Country Singles chart the week of May 23 and number 28 on the Billboard Hot 100 shortly afterward. The single later returned to number one on the country chart the week of June 23. In addition, it also peaked at number three on the Canadian RPM Country Tracks chart and number seventy six on the RPM Top Singles Chart. Satin Sheets was released around the same time its single became a major hit. The album peaked at number 1 on the Billboard Magazine Top Country Albums chart and number 122 on the Billboard 200 albums chart. Satin Sheets spent eight weeks at number one on the Top Country Albums, becoming the second-longest running album on the chart by a female artist.

== Track listing ==
Side one

1. "Satin Sheets" (John E. Volenkaty) – 3:27
2. "Walking Piece of Heaven" (Marty Robbins) – 3:01
3. "Hold on Woman" (Sharon Higgins) – 2:26
4. "Baby's Gone" (Conway Twitty, Billy Parks) – 2:41
5. "Sweet Sweetheart" (Carole King, Gerry Goffin) – 2:31
6. "Lonely Women Cryin'" (Faye Bradshaw) – 2:52

Side two

1. "What My Thoughts Do All the Time" (Jeanne Pruett) – 3:03
2. "The Only Way to Hold Your Man" (Sharon Higgins) – 2:45
3. "Is Her Love Any Better Than Mine" (Ray Griff) – 2:38
4. "I've Been So Wrong, for So Long" (Bud Reneau, Hal Bynum) – 2:45
5. "Your Memory's Comin' On" (Jeanne Pruett) – 2:49

== Personnel ==
- Jeanne Pruett – Vocals
- Grady Martin – Guitar
- Harold Bradley – Guitar
- Jerry Shook – Guitar, harmonica
- Pete Wade – Guitar
- Bob Moore – Bass
- Jerry Smith – Piano
- Buddy Harman – Drums
- The Jordanaires – Background Vocals
- Duane West, Winnifred Breast, Millie Kirkham, Laverna Moore — Background Vocals

== Sales chart positions ==
=== Weekly charts ===
Chart (1973)	Peak position
US Billboard 200	122
US Top Country Albums (Billboard)	1

=== Year-end charts ===
Chart (1973)	Position
US Top Country Albums (Billboard)	3

=== Singles ===
Year	Song	Peak chart positions				
Year	Song	US Country	US	CAN Country	CAN	CAN AC
1973	"Satin Sheets"	1	28	3	76	66
