= Just Get Up and Close the Door =

Single by Johnny Rodriguez

from the album Just Get Up and Close the Door
- B-side: "Am I That Easy to Forget"
- Released: April 1975
- Genre: Country
- Length: 1:58
- Label: Mercury
- Songwriter(s): Linda Hargrove
- Producer(s): Jerry Kennedy

Johnny Rodriguez singles chronology
"I Just Can't Get Her Out of My Mind" (1975)	"Just Get Up and Close the Door" (1975)	"Love Put a Song in My Heart" (1975)

"'Just Get Up and Close the Door" is a song written by Linda Hargrove, and recorded by Johnny Rodriguez. It was released in April 1975 as the first single and title track from the album Just Get Up and Close the Door. The song was Rodriguez's fifth number one on the country chart. The single stayed at number one for one week and spent a total of ten weeks on the chart.

== Charts ==
=== Weekly charts ===
Chart (1975)	Peak position
US Hot Country Songs (Billboard)	1
Canadian RPM Country Tracks	2

=== Year-end charts ===
Chart (1975)	Position
US Hot Country Songs (Billboard)	20
