= Then Who Am I =

Single by Charley Pride

from the album Pride of America
- B-side: "Completely Helpless"
- Released: November 1974
- Genre: Country
- Length: 2:13
- Label: RCA
- Songwriter(s): Dallas Frazier; A.L. "Doodle" Owens
- Producer(s): Jerry Bradley

Charley Pride singles chronology
"Mississippi Cotton Picking Delta Town" (1974)	"Then Who Am I" (1974)	"I Ain't All Bad" (1975)

"Then Who Am I" is a song written by Dallas Frazier and A.L. "Doodle" Owens, and recorded by American country music artist Charley Pride. It was released in November 1974 as the second single from the album Pride of America. The song was Pride's fourteenth number one song on the country chart. The single stayed at number one for one week and spent a total of nine weeks on the country chart.

== Chart performance ==
Chart (1974–1975)	Peak position
US Hot Country Songs (Billboard)	1
Canadian RPM Country Tracks	1
