= Satin Sheets (Jeanne Pruett song) =

Single by Jeanne Pruett

from the album Satin Sheets
- B-side: "Sweet Sweetheart"
- Released: February 1973
- Recorded: December 29, 1972
- Studio: Bradley's Barn (Mt. Juliet, Tennessee)
- Genre: Country
- Length: 3:07
- Label: MCA 40015
- Songwriter(s): John Volinkaty
- Producer(s): Walter Haynes

Jeanne Pruett singles chronology
"I Forgot More Than You'll Ever Know (About Him)" (1972)	"Satin Sheets" (1973)	"I'm Your Woman" (1973)

"Satin Sheets" is a song written by John Volinkaty, and originally recorded by Bill Anderson and Jan Howard on their March 1972 duet album, Bill & Jan or (Jan & Bill). It was then famously covered by American country music artist Jeanne Pruett in February 1973 as the first single and title track from her album of the same name. The song was Pruett's only Number One country hit, as well as her only chart entry on the Billboard Hot 100.

== Song history ==
Jeanne Pruett struggled for years under RCA Records in the 1960s, before signing successfully with Decca Records in 1969, which then became MCA Records the year "Satin Sheets" was released. She finally started charting the Country list in 1971, then by 1972, she was hitting the Top 40 with her self-penned "Love Me" (later a bigger Country hit for Marty Robbins). "Satin Sheets" was released as a single in February 1973. Writer John "Jack" Volinkaty said the idea came to him in 1970 while he was grocery shopping in Minneapolis. He went home and wrote it in 5 minutes, but said it took him a year to sell. Volinkaty died in 1992.

"Satin Sheets" hit country radio in March 1973, aided by 1,600 pink satin sheets that Jeanne cut by hand and sent to radio programmers and music executives across the nation. The international hit topped the country charts that May.

The song was such a big hit it became a modest crossover hit, reaching No. 28 on the Billboard Hot 100. "Satin Sheets" went on to become Pruett's biggest hit and career hit, as well as a signature Country tune of the 1970s. The song was revolutionary for Country music at the time, for its open discussion of sex. The song talks of how a housewife is unhappy with her marriage to a man who only gives gifts to his wife instead of giving her real love. An album of the same name was released that year, that topped the "Top Country Albums" chart as well. The album featured Pruett lying in a pink bed, with pink satin clothes and satin sheets. Because of the song's success, Pruett was invited to join the Grand Ole Opry.

Pruett referenced the song in her 1979 single "Please Sing Satin Sheets for Me", which included a portion of her recording of "Satin Sheets" at the end.

== Chart performance ==
Chart (1973)	Peak position
Australia (Kent Music Report)	20
Canadian RPM Country Tracks	3
Canadian RPM Top Singles	76
Canadian RPM Adult Contemporary Tracks	66
U.S. Billboard Hot Country Singles	1
U.S. Billboard Hot 100	28

== Cover versions ==
"Satin Sheets" has been recorded by artists including:

- Dolly Parton
- Tammy Wynette
- Loretta Lynn
- Hank Williams Jr.
- Martina McBride.
- Debbie Rule, covered the song on her album Texas Girls (2015).

== Parodies ==
It has been spoofed as "Santa's Sheets" by New Orleans act Benny Grunch and Kathy Savoie, sung from the perspective of Mrs.Santa Claus.
