= Jeanne Pruett =

American singer-songwriter (born 1935)

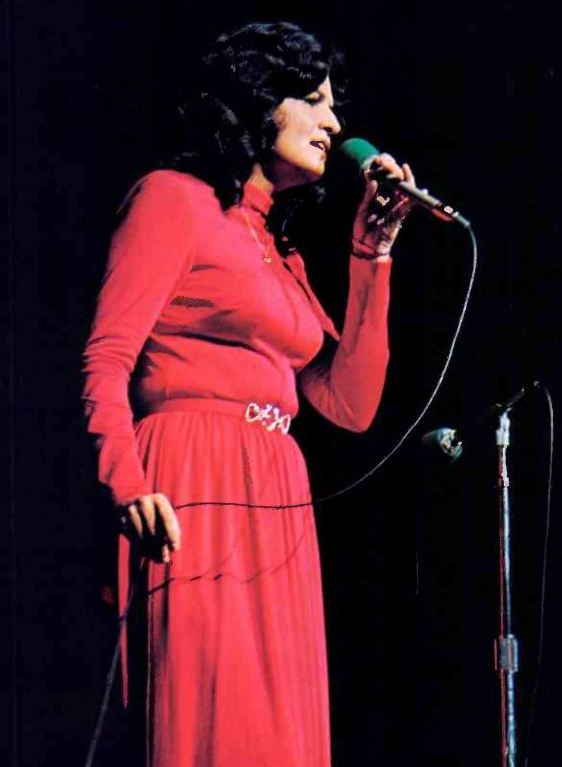
- Jeanne Pruett, performing on the Grand Ole Opry, 1975
- Born: Norma Jean Bowman; January 30, 1935 (age 91); Pell City, Alabama, U.S.
- Occupations: Singer; songwriter; author
- Years active: 1963–2006
- Spouses: Jack Pruett (m. 1955; div. 1982); Eddie Fulton (m. 1985; died 2019)
- Children: 2
- Musical career
- Genres: Country; traditional country
- Instruments: Vocals; guitar
- Labels: RCA Victor; Decca/MCA; Mercury; IBC; Audiograph

Jeanne Pruett (/ˈdʒiːni ˈpruːɪt/, JEE-nee PROO-it) (born Norma Jean Bowman; January 30, 1935) is an American country music singer and songwriter and author. Pruett had several major hits as a music artist, but became best-known for 1973's "Satin Sheets". The song topped the country music charts and helped her secure a membership in the Grand Ole Opry cast.

Pruett was raised near Pell City, Alabama, and grew up with a large family. She performed with her family from an early age and learned several musical instruments. She married guitarist Jack Pruett before turning 20 years old. Soon after, the couple moved to Nashville, Tennessee, where he was hired to play guitar for country artist Marty Robbins. In the early 1960s, Pruett devoted more time to writing her own songs. Her material was heard by Robbins who recorded her early work. Her writing helped her gain her first recording contract with RCA Victor in 1963. After limited success she moved to Decca/MCA Records where 1971's "Hold on to My Unchanging Love" became her first charting single on the Billboard country list. Pruett's debut studio album was then released the following year.

In 1973, Pruett recorded "Satin Sheets" and the song became her biggest hit. An album of the same name topped the country albums chart and she was nominated for several major awards from the Academy of Country Music and Country Music Association. In July 1973, Pruett was made a member of the Grand Ole Opry and became a frequent performer on the broadcast for several decades. She had further hits following "Satin Sheets" with the songs "I'm Your Woman" and "You Don't Need to Move a Mountain". During the remainder of the 1970s, Pruett continued releasing material with little success. In 1979, Pruett returned with her fifth studio album. The record spawned three songs that became top ten hits on the country charts, including 1980's "Temporarily Yours".

Pruett continued recording and releasing music throughout the 1980s. Her sixth (and final) studio release was a self-titled effort in 1985. The following year, she was part of the Grand Ole Opry's first all-female segment. The same year, she began a second career as an author of cookbooks. In 1986, Pruett published the first in a series of works entitled Feedin' Friends. She also hosted her own cooking show on The Nashville Network during this time. Pruett continued performing into the early 2000s before officially retiring in 2006.

== Early life ==
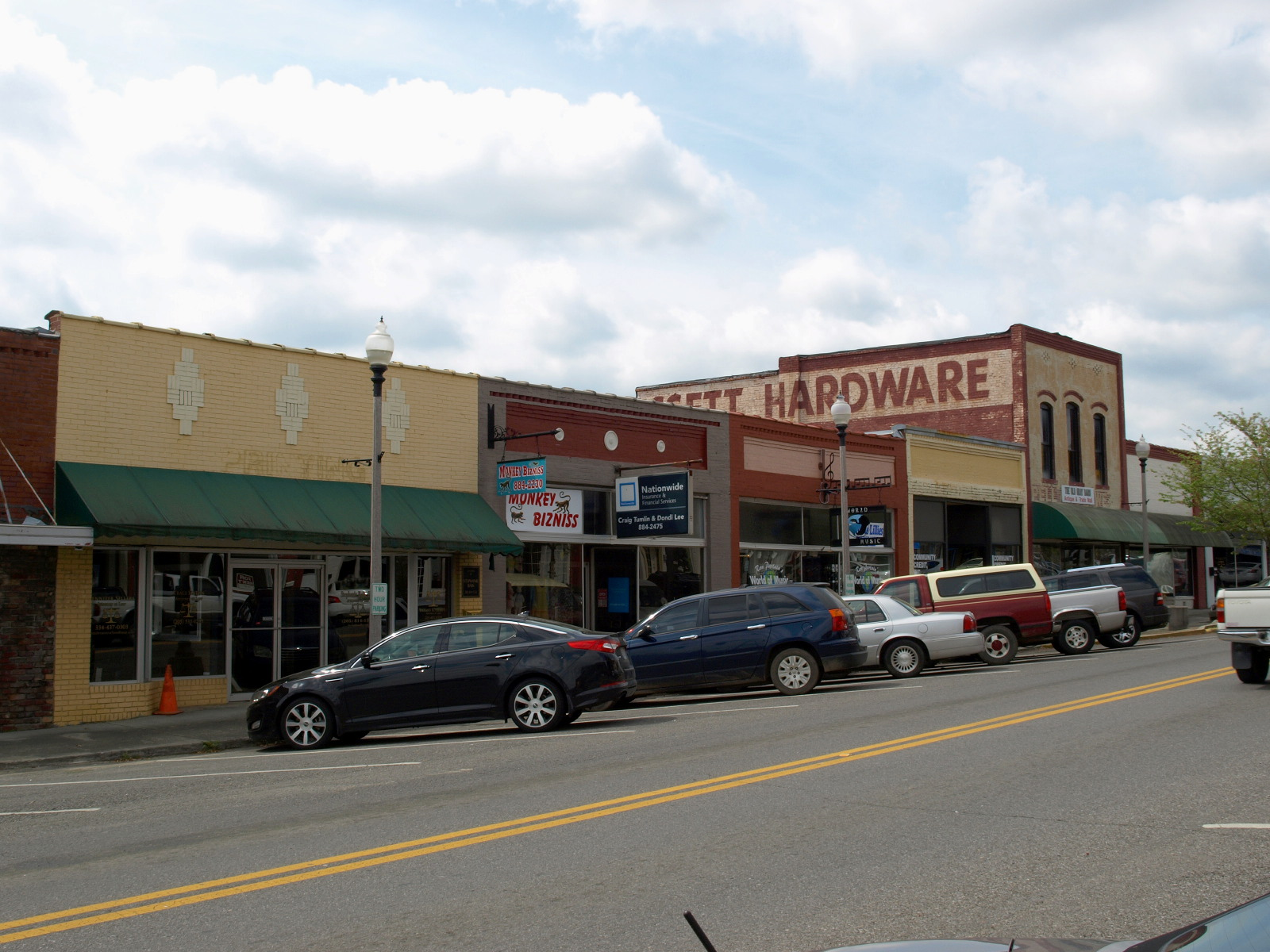
Downtown Pell City, Alabama. Pruett was born and raised on a farm outside the city.

Pruett was born Norma Jean Bowman outside of Pell City, Alabama, United States. She was raised on a farm and was one of 12 children. Pruett recalled the experiences of being raised on a farm in her 2017 autobiography. "The beauty of the farm, dotted with tall pine trees, sweet shrubs, and blooming dogwood trees, reminded me why they worked so hard, because there wasn't a more perfect sight in the world than that old farm," she explained. In 1947, the Bowman family farm caught fire which devastated the family. "The only sounds now were an occasional pop of the dying sparks and the sound of Mama softly crying, her tired arms holding on to Dad and the children," she recounted. With the support of neighbors, the Bowmans rebuilt their home on the same property within a year's time.

In her childhood, Pruett often informally performed music with her family. They often sang together on the front porch of their farmhouse where she also learned to harmonize. At home, Pruett also learned how to play musical instruments. She learned how to first play guitar from the song "Down the Trail of Achin' Hearts". She also frequently listened to the radio. "It seemed to me that the voices of the DJs were as recognizable to me as the voices of my favorite singers of the day," Pruett said. Outside of the home environment, Pruett joined her school's choral group and formed a trio in high school called "The Super Suds".

Pruett dropped out of high school in the tenth grade and got a job at a telephone company in Anniston, Alabama. While not working, she and her sister would attend dances at a local VFW hall. At these dances, she also became interested in performance opportunities. She started singing with the VFW's country band and appeared on a local television station. "Now the entertainment hook was really in my mouth," Pruett remembered. It was at these outings that she met guitarist Jack Pruett and they began dating. Jack enlisted in the military shortly after their relationship began. While awaiting his return, Jeanne moved into his sister's home. After Jack returned from the service, the couple married in 1955. Also in 1955, Jack became the touring guitarist for country artist Ray Price.

In 1956, the pair moved to Nashville, Tennessee, so that Jack could continue performing in Price's band. The couple lived in a trailer park and were neighbors to country performers Lester Flatt, Hawkshaw Hawkins and Jean Shepard. While still living at the trailer, Pruett gave birth to their first child. Shortly after the birth, Jack Pruett accepted a job playing guitar in Marty Robbins' road band. After accepting the position, the family moved into a two-story house in Nashville.

== Career ==
=== 1963–1972: Early career ===
Pruett developed a songwriting hobby while raising her new family and became increasingly devoted to it once her children entered school. In 1963, her husband brought her songs to Marty Robbins, who signed her to his publishing company. While several of her songs were demoed by a male singer, Pruett sang the demo version of her self-penned "Count Me Out". Robbins was so impressed by the song, he later recorded it and had a country chart hit with it. He was also impressed by Pruett's singing and told her "I believe we've discovered a new girl singer!" Robbins brought Pruett's songs to the attention of producer, Chet Atkins, at RCA Victor Records who signed her to a recording contract with RCA in 1963. That year, her first single entitled "Just a Little After Heartaches" was issued by RCA. She recalled first hearing it on the radio the same day Patsy Cline was killed in a March 1963 plane crash. "I'm sure my song release was so overshadowed by the shocking news of their death that the only two people who heard and remembered my song was Grant Turner and me," she recalled.

Pruett returned to domestic life after her RCA singles were unsuccessful, focusing on being a housewife and composing songs for Robbins's publishing company. In 1969, she signed a new recording contract with Decca Records after Robbins brought two of her songs to producer Owen Bradley. "This girl's got a housewife sound, and I can sell her," Bradley told Robbins. She had moderate success in 1971 with the single "Hold on to My Unchanging Love". It became Pruett's first chart entry, reaching number 66 on the US country songs chart. The following year, Pruett's self-penned "Love Me" was released and became her first top 40 entry on the US country chart. Robbins recorded the track shortly after the original and had a top-10 hit on the same chart. In October 1972, Pruett's debut studio album was released on the Decca label. It was reviewed by Billboard magazine the same month, who wrote, "A sterling, stirring effort for the debut of Jeanne Pruett."

=== 1973–1975: "Satin Sheets" and breakthrough at MCA Records ===
By 1973, Pruett's music career was gaining more momentum. She worked several dates overseas booked by agent, Hubert Long, and made several appearances on the Grand Ole Opry. The same year she released the John Volinkaty composition called "Satin Sheets". The song had first been cut as a duet between Bill Anderson and Jan Howard on their studio album Bill and Jan (Or Jan and Bill). Pruett's producer, Walter Haynes, believed the song could be a hit if the lyrics were modified. According to Pruett, she rewrote the introduction to help make the song more record-friendly. She then presented it to Haynes who was pleased with the track. Decca (now MCA Records) believed that "Satin Sheets" was too traditional in its production and chose not to promote it as a single. Instead, Pruett promoted it herself by distributing a series of pink satin records and mailing it to disc jockeys. The marketing method worked when "Satin Sheets" reached number one on the US country chart in May 1973 and number 28 on the US Hot 100. The song's success prompted an album of the same name to be released in June 1973, which topped the US country albums survey in July was her highest-charting LP.

"Satin Sheets"
Pruett's signature song, which topped the country charts and was nominated for several major awards (1973).

"Satin Sheets" gained positive responses and acclaim following its success. While reviewing her 1973 album, Billboard magazine stated that "Miss Pruett let's loose some of that talent that restrained in relative obscurity over the years." In later years, writer Kurt Wolff commented that the song "was far more country -sounding than most songs coming out of Nashville at the time." In addition "Satin Sheets" received positive response from the country community at large. In late 1973, Pruett was nominated for three accolades at the Country Music Association Awards including "Single of the Year" and "Female Vocalist of the Year". She was also nominated in similar categories by the Academy of Country Music. Pruett also accepted an invitation to join the Grand Ole Opry in June 1973. In her autobiography, she recalled her Opry membership: "Dolly Parton announced me and said, 'Tonight I'm introducing the newest member of the Grand Ole Opry, Miss Satin Sheets, Jeanne Pruett'."

After "Satin Sheets" reached number one, Pruett's schedule became increasingly demanding. "With Jeanne now a star, with hit records and so many signed contracts for road dates, I had to buy a briefcase to carry them all," she wrote. According to Pruett, she was making $135 per day, which she claimed was the same amount Dolly Parton was making. Pruett's follow-up release in August 1973 called "I'm Your Woman". became her second major hit, climbing to number eight on the US country chart. The following year, Pruett's eponymous third studio album was released and peaked at number 19 on the country albums chart. The project included "You Don't Need to Move a Mountain", her third major hit on the country songs survey.

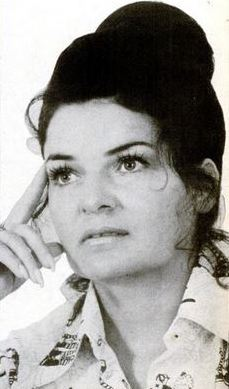
Pruett in an ad for Billboard magazine, 1973

In 1975, MCA released Pruett's fourth studio recording, Honey on His Hands. Although the album peaked in a lower charting US country chart positions, it included four singles that made its top 40. This included the songs "A Poor Man's Woman" and "Welcome to the Sunshine (Sweet Baby Jane)". Despite a lower chart performance, the album's material received positive reception. Wolff praised the songs, calling them "deep country cuts". Billboard also praised the album, highlighting the title track as a standout.

=== 1976–1983: Career decline and comeback ===
Pruett continued recording for MCA Records. The label released a series of singles by Pruett during the mid 1970s that failed to find success. Songs such as "My Baby's Gone", "I've Taken" and "She's Still All Over You" reached positions outside the country top 40. In 1977, the single "I'm Living a Lie" reached the US country top 30, becoming her highest-climbing single of the past several years. The same year, Pruett left MCA and signed with Mercury Records as part of the label's Nashville artist expansion. According to a Billboard article, Mercury developed a marketing plan to help promote its newer artists. The label also intended to release four LP's by their artists as part of the plan. However, the intended plans did not occur and the label's only single release by Pruett was "I'm a Woman" (1978), which only climbed to number 94 on the country chart.

In 1979, Pruett signed a contract with the independent label, IBC Records. Her first IBC release was "Please Sing Satin Sheets for Me" (a song based on her 1973 signature tune). Kevin John Coyne of Country Universe commented that the tune "didn’t sound like the record of an artist serious about a comeback." It was followed by three songs that brought forth a comeback in her career. The first was the self-penned "Back to Back", which reached number six on the US country chart. The following release, "Temporarily Yours", became her highest peaking IBC hit, climbing to number five. "It's Too Late" would reach number nine on the country chart before the end of 1980. Billboard took notice of Pruett's return in an October issue of their magazine, calling it an "artist resurgence". "It all added up to remarkable comeback by this personable start of IBC Records and the 'Grand Ole Opry'," writers commented. With new success, IBC issued her fifth studio effort, Encore!. The album was her first since 1975 to reach the country albums chart where it peaked at number 18.

Pruett continued recording for IBC and briefly for the Audiograph label in the early 1980s. She also teamed up with Marty Robbins for what was intended to be a duet album project. However, Robbins died in 1982 before the pair could record enough material to fill an album and instead, the pair's duet version of "Love Me" was released as a single. The song only reached number 58 on the country chart in 1983. According to Pruett, Rick Blackburn of Columbia Records (Robbins' label) sued IBC in response to the duet single because Robbins "never intended" to release it. Pruett believed that Blackburn may have had other intentions behind suing the label. "I've always though he and Columbia Records were just pissed off, that Columbia would receive no money from sales. It seemed like a lame excuse to me," she commented in her autobiography.

=== 1984–present: Career slowdown, cookbooks and retirement ===
Pruett slowed down her music career as the 1980s progressed. She still remained a regular Opry member and dedicated time to regular appearances on the program. Her next album was not released until 1985 and is her final studio album to date in a joint venture between Dot and MCA Records. The album was part of a project that included new album releases by other veteran country artists including Jan Howard and Billie Jo Spears. The record was produced by Billy Strange. Her 1987 single, "Rented Room", was her final to chart, peaking at number 81 on the US country survey. During the same time frame, Pruett became part of the Grand Ole Opry's first "all-female" segment. The idea was formulated by Pruett who brought it to the attention of the organization after a 1985 television special honoring the 60th anniversary of the Opry. In 1986, the segment aired on the Grand Ole Opry broadcast and was hosted by Jean Shepard. It also included female Opry members Jan Howard, Jeannie Seely and Connie Smith.

In 1986, Pruett made a career shift into professional cooking. That year she released her first cookbook titled Feedin' Friends. To promote the book, Pruett made regular appearances on The Nashville Network's Nashville Now program with host Ralph Emery. In 1988, she published a second book as part of the Feedin' Friends cooking series. According to Pruett, the cookbooks have sold hundreds of thousands of copies since their original release. Four books were eventually released as part of the series. The success of the products led to the opening of a restaurant named "JP's Feedin' Friends". The restaurant was located inside of the Opryland USA theme park in Nashville, Tennessee and eventually closed in 1997.

As she led a more active domestic life, Pruett maintained a semi-active role in her career in the 1990s and 2000s. She was inducted into the North American Country Music Association Hall of Fame during this time period. In the mid 2000s she also hosted the program's annual seminars in Pigeon Forge, Tennessee. In 2006, Pruett announced her retirement from performing and no longer makes regular appearances on the Grand Ole Opry. However, she still remains a member. She returned to domestic life and lived on a ranch outside of Nashville. After ten years of retirement, Pruett released an autobiography in 2018 entitled Miss Satin Sheets: I Remember. The book was released by Page Publishing.

== Personal life ==
Pruett has been married two times. She married her first husband, Jack Pruett, on October 10, 1955. Shortly following their wedding, Jack left to embark on a several-week tour with Marty Robbins. For the remainder of their marriage, he would often be traveling on the road. The couple welcomed their first child shortly after moving to Nashville named Jack Pruett, Jr. After their son was born and Jack was making a more steady income, the family moved to a two-story house in Nashville. At their new home, the couple were neighbors to The Wilburn Brothers. In 1958, the couple welcomed their second child, Jael and moved to a larger estate in the Nashville area. In later years, Pruett's children became musicians themselves and often performed with her onstage.

In 1982, Pruett divorced her husband, citing his alcohol problems and busy schedules. In her 2017 autobiography, she explained her feelings behind the divorce. "Our divorce in the early 1980s was the most painful time in our lives. At that time, I would traded all my success and all his success for the divorce never to have happened," she recalled. According to Pruett, the couple remained "civil" towards one another. Jack Pruett later remarried and died in 2011.

Pruett moved to a nearby apartment following her divorce. Her road manager and occasional bus driver, Eddie Fulton, also lived in the same complex. The pair spent more time together and developed a romantic relationship. In 1985, the couple married and built a log-styled home. "We had lots in common, so we just fell in love," she recounted. Fulton died in July 2019. Pruett's only son, Jack Pruett, Jr., died on February 1, 2022.

== Musical styles and legacy ==
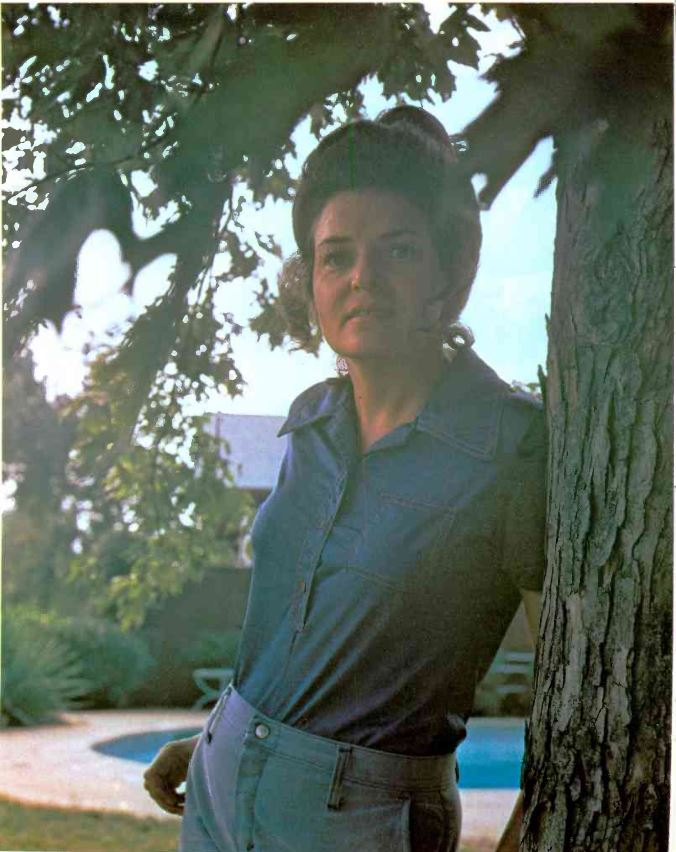
Pruett in 1974

Pruett's musical style is rooted in country music. More specifically, it is rooted in the traditional country and country pop sub-genres. Pruett's traditional country style was inspired by the early Opry stars of her childhood. "As a young person growing up in a large family, I had the radio as a best friend, because it could give me so much pleasure," she recalled. In her autobiography, Pruett cited Eddy Arnold, Bill Monroe, Patsy Montana and Ernest Tubb as influences on her style. Writers and critics noticed Pruett's traditional sound but also identified pop influences as well. Stephen Thomas Erlewine of Allmusic characterized her production influence when reviewing her 1998 "greatest hits" effort. "She did have a sound appealing to housewives -- something based in Loretta Lynn's pure country (appropriate, considering the Bradley connection), but also with a distinct pop undercurrent, creating a sound that was at once country and crossover.

"I could probably sing 'Stardust,' but it ain't nearly as pretty to me as 'Wild Side of Life'."

— Jeanne Pruett on her musical style

Other writers recognized that many of her songs centered around themes associated with love, wealth and women's independence in relationships. Mary Bufwack and Robert K. Oermann considered her style to be associated with "womanhood", drawing comparisons to Melba Montgomery and Jean Shepard. "Jeanne Pruett always communicated womanly strength, backwoods country honesty, and intense emotional conviction," they wrote in 2003. Author Kurt Wolff found similar qualities associated with Pruett's songs. "She also evoked the wisdom of someone who knew what she wanted – her declarations of love, fidelity, and longing came from a place of strength," he noted.

Pruett is also recognized for her legacy in the country music genre. Her work as an early female songwriter has been recognized in recent years by writers and journalists. In 2018, Kevin John Coyne stated, "Pruett’s legacy is longer than just that hit and those that followed. She’s one of the first female country artists in history to start as a songwriter first, gaining credibility with her pen more than a decade before her voice was center stage." She is also recognized as a significant Grand Ole Opry member. "Jeanne is one of the warmest, funniest, earthiest female personalities in the Opry cast. Her dressing room backstage at the Opry is always a female gathering spot," Bufwack and Oermann commented.

== Discography ==
Studio albums

- Love Me (1972)
- Satin Sheets (1973)
- Jeanne Pruett (1974)
- Honey on His Hands (1975)
- Encore! (1979)
- Jeanne Pruett (1985)

== Awards and nominations ==
Year	Nominee / work	Award	Result	Ref.
1971	Academy of Country Music Awards	Top New Female Vocalist	Nominated	
1973	Grand Ole Opry	Inducted as 147th member	Won	
1973	Country Music Association Awards	Album of the Year – Satin Sheets	Nominated	
1973	Country Music Association Awards	Female Vocalist of the Year	Nominated	
1973	Country Music Association Awards	Single of the Year – "Satin Sheets"	Nominated	
1974	Billboard Magazine	Best Album – Satin Sheets	Won	
1974	Billboard Magazine	Best Female Artist	Won	
1974	Academy of Country Music Awards	Single Record of the Year – "Satin Sheets"	Nominated	

== Books ==
- Feedin' Friends (1986)
- Feedin' Friends Cookbook II (1991)
- Feedin' Friends Cookbook III (1991)
