= Johnny Rodriguez =

American singer (1951–2025)

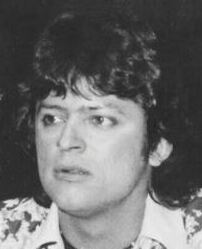
- Rodriguez in 1976

Background information
- Born: Juan Raoul Davis Rodriguez; December 10, 1951; Sabinal, Texas, U.S.
- Died: May 9, 2025 (aged 73) San Antonio, Texas, U.S.
- Genres: Country; outlaw country
- Occupations: Singer; songwriter
- Instruments: Vocals; guitar
- Years active: 1972–2025
- Labels: Mercury; Epic; Capitol; Paula
- Website: johnnyrodriguezmusic.com

Juan Raoul Davis "Johnny" Rodriguez (December 10, 1951 – May 9, 2025) was an American country music singer from Texas. In the 1970s and 1980s, Rodriguez was one of country music's most successful male artists, recording a string of hit songs, such as "You Always Come Back (To Hurting Me)", "Desperado", "Down on the Rio Grande", and "Foolin'". He recorded six No. 1 country hits in his career.

== Early life ==
Rodriguez was born to a Mexican American family in Sabinal, Texas, on December 10, 1951,. He was the second-youngest in a family of 10 children living in a four-room house. Growing up in Sabinal, Rodriguez was a good student in school and an altar boy for his church. He was also the captain of his junior high school football team. When Rodriguez was 16 years old, his father died of cancer, and his older brother, Andres, died in an automobile accident the following year. The two incidents had an effect on Rodriguez and he became a troubled teen.

In 1969, at age 18, Rodriguez ended up in jail. (It was often said that he was arrested for stealing a goat, although Jackson would later state that Rodriguez was in jail simply for an unpaid fine.) He sang frequently in his cell and was overheard by Texas Ranger Joaquin Jackson, who was impressed and told promoter "Happy" Shahan about him.

Shahan then hired Johnny to perform at his local tourist attraction called the Alamo Village. During one of his sets in 1971, he came to the attention of country singers Tom T. Hall and Bobby Bare, who encouraged the young singer to go to Nashville, Tennessee. The 21-year-old singer arrived in Nashville with only a guitar in his hand and $14 in his pocket. Hall soon found work for Rodriguez fronting his band, as well as writing songs.

Less than one year later, Hall took Rodriguez to Mercury Records' Nashville division and landed him an audition with the record label. After performing the songs "I Can't Stop Loving You" and "If I Left It Up to You", he was offered a contract with Mercury. He signed and began recording in their Nashville studio.

== Career ==
=== Career in the 1970s ===
After signing with Mercury, his first single to be released was 1972's "Pass Me By (If You're Only Passing Through)". This recording was a success, going to number 9 on the Hot Country Songs list that year. Rodriguez became the first well-known American of Mexican descent country singer.

In 1972, Rodriguez was voted the Most Promising Vocalist by the Academy of Country Music. The next year, he achieved his first number-one hit song, "You Always Come Back to Hurting Me". Another song that year, "Ridin' My Thumb to Mexico", written by Rodriguez, was also a number-one hit. Both songs were listed in the Billboard Hot 100.

In 1973, his debut album was released, which rose to number one on the Top Country Albums chart. He was nominated for Male Vocalist of the Year by the CMA Awards. In addition to his success in country music, he also had a role on the television show Adam-12 and made a guest appearance on The Dating Game in 1974.

In 1975, all three singles he released reached to number one on the country chart: "I Just Can't Get Her Out of My Mind", "Just Get Up and Close the Door", and "Love Put a Song in My Heart." Rodriguez's success on the country chart continued throughout much of the 1970s. He recorded songs not only written by himself around this time, but also covers of songs such as George Harrison's "Something," Linda Hargrove's "Just Get Up and Close the Door," Mickey Newbury's "Poison Red Berries," and Billy Joe Shaver's "Texas Up Here Tennessee." By 1975, Rodriguez was considered a member of the outlaw country market in country music, like fellow musicians Bobby Bare and Tom T. Hall.

=== Career in the 1980s and 1990s and murder charge ===
Despite the outlaw movement fading from view in the late 1970s, Rodriguez was determined to stay on top of his game. In 1979, he switched to Epic Records. There, he worked with the record producer Billy Sherrill. His first hit from Epic came that year with the number-six country hit, "Down on the Rio Grande". His debut album from the record company was entitled Rodriguez, although all the songs from the album were cover versions.

Although Rodriguez did not make the top 10 continuously as in the past, he managed to stay in the top 20, with hits including "Fools For Each Other" and "What'll I Tell Virginia". At the same time, Rodriguez continued to be a popular concert attraction. However, Rodriguez was also having personal problems, due to his drug addiction. In 1982, he did a duet with Zella Lehr on the song "Most Beautiful Girl (La Chica Mas Linda)". The single was released by Columbia Records. In 1983, he went into the top five with the hit song "Foolin'", followed by the top-10 hit "How Could I Love Her So Much". By the mid-1980s, though, he was becoming less successful, and in 1986, he left Epic Records.

In 1987, he signed with Capitol Records for a brief period of time. He had his last major hit in 1988 with "I Didn't (Every Chance I Had)," which reached number 12 on the country chart. By 1989, he had left Capitol.

In August 1998, Rodriguez shot and killed a 28-year-old acquaintance in his Texas home, believing the man to be a burglar. In October 1999, he was acquitted of murder by a jury.

In 1993, he recorded an album for Intersound Records called Run for the Border. In the mid-1990s, the indie label High-Tone released his album, You Can Say That Again. He continued to tour around the country during this time. In 1996, he turned to another label, Paula Records, which issued "One Bar at a Time", but it was unsuccessful. By this time, his musical presence was fading from the public view.

=== 1998–2025 ===
From 1998 onwards, Rodriguez toured the United States and further afield including Switzerland, Poland, the UK, South Korea, Canada, and Mexico. He performed concerts at the Ryman Auditorium and Carnegie Hall.

Rodriguez continued to tour and record new material, performing dates in the United States and Canada. In 2012, he released his first live album, Johnny Rodriguez: Live from Texas.

== Awards and recognition ==
Rodriguez was honored by three U.S. presidents: Jimmy Carter, George H. W. Bush, and George W. Bush. He played at George H.W. Bush's inaugural ball.

On August 18, 2007, Rodriguez was inducted into the Texas Country Music Hall of Fame, located in Carthage, Texas.

On October 23, 2010, Rodriguez received the Institute of Hispanic Culture Pioneer Award, in recognition of his accomplishment as the first major Hispanic singer in country music.

== Personal life ==
Rodriguez was first married to Linda Diann Patterson, a Southern Airways flight attendant from Conyers, Georgia. His second marriage was in 1995 to Lana Nelson, daughter of country singer-songwriter Willie Nelson. That marriage lasted seven months. His final marriage was to Debbie McNeely, a hair-salon owner from San Marcos, Texas, in 1998, with whom he had a daughter, Aubry Rae Rodriguez, born in April 1998. They were still married at the time of his death.

Rodriguez died after entering hospice care in San Antonio, Texas, on May 9, 2025, at the age of 73.

== Awards and nominations ==
=== Academy of Country Music Awards ===
Year	Nominee / work	Award	Result
1973	Johnny Rodriguez	Most Promising Male Vocalist	Won
1973	"Pass Me By (If You're Only Passing Through)"	Single Record of the Year	Nominated
1974	Introducing Johnny Rodriguez	Album of the Year	Nominated
1974	Johnny Rodriguez	Top Male Vocalist of the Year	Nominated
1974	Johnny Rodriguez	Entertainer of the Year	Nominated

=== Country Music Association Awards ===
Year	Nominee / work	Award	Result
1973	Johnny Rodriguez	Male Vocalist of the Year	Nominated
1994	Tribute to the Music of Bob Wills and the Texas Playboys	Album of the Year	Nominated
