= Bradley's Barn =

Music recording studio in Nashville, Tennessee

- Industry: Recording studio
- Founded: Mount Juliet, Tennessee, U.S. (1964)
- Founder: Owen Bradley
- Defunct: 2008
- Fate: Reopened in 2025
- Headquarters: Mount Juliet, Tennessee, U.S.
- Number of locations: 1

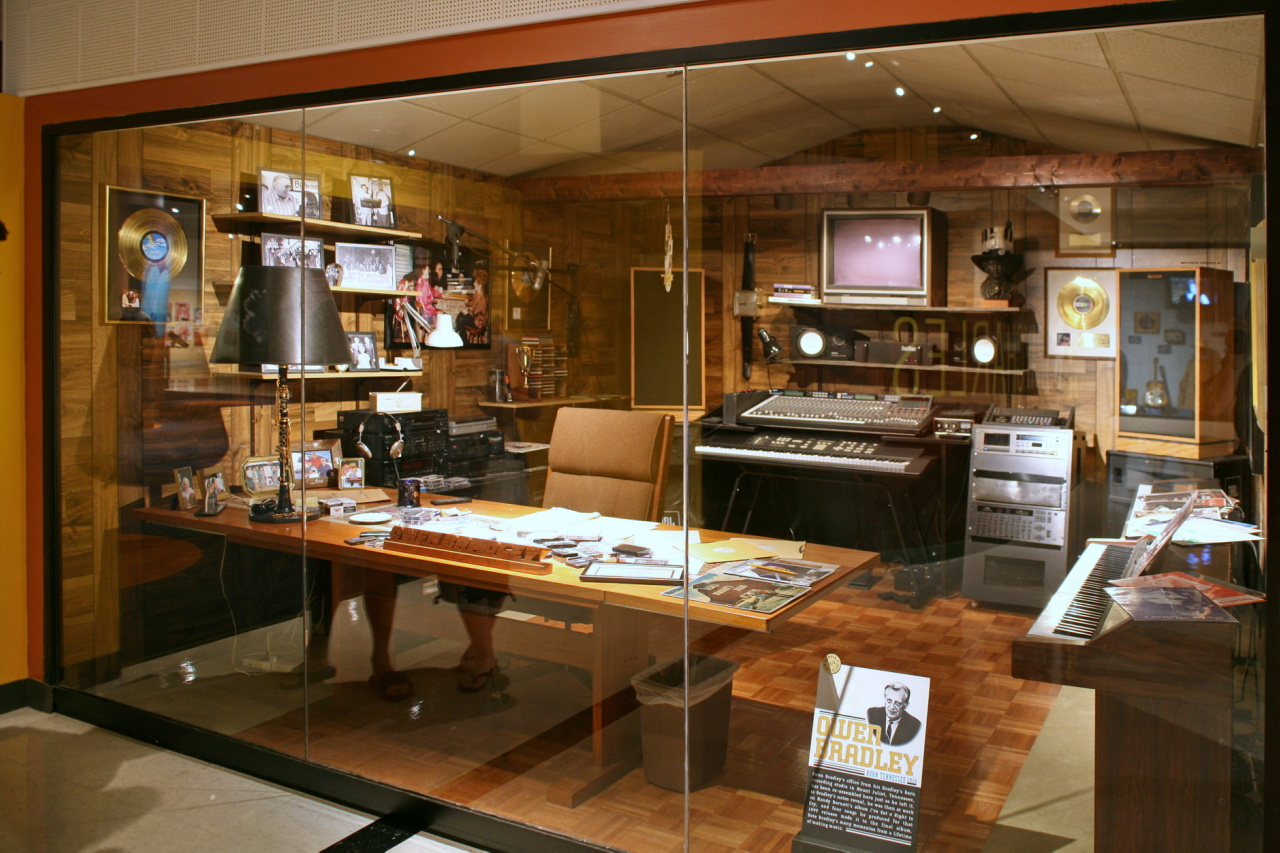
Country Music Hall of Fame and Museum exhibit of Owen Bradley's office in 1998

Bradley's Barn was a music recording studio founded in 1964 by Owen Bradley. The studio was built in a converted barn on farmland in the Nashville suburb of Mount Juliet, and was the site of numerous notable recordings by artists including The Who, Loretta Lynn, Conway Twitty, Brenda Lee, The Beau Brummels, J. J. Cale, Bill Anderson, k.d. lang, George Jones, Leon Russell, Townes Van Zandt, and others.

== History ==
After brothers Harold and Owen Bradley sold their Quonset Hut Studio to Columbia Records in 1962, Owen bought a farm at 722 Benders Ferry Road in Mount Juliet, a suburb 17 miles east of Nashville. Investing less than $2000 in equipment, Owen and his son Jerry converted a barn on the property into a studio for recording demos. By 1964, the barn had evolved into a fully-fledged recording studio, which Bradley appropriately named "Bradley's Barn."

Within a few years, Bradley's Barn became a popular recording venue in country music circles, hosting 488 sessions in 1967 alone. The following year, the Beau Brummels paid tribute to the studio, naming their 1968 album Bradley's Barn after the studio where it was recorded. The studio hosted recording projects by such future Country Music Hall of Fame inductees as Brenda Lee, Loretta Lynn, Webb Pierce, and Conway Twitty. Other artists who recorded at the studio in the 1960s included Jack Greene, Joan Baez, Gordon Lightfoot, Warner Mack, and Dinah Shore, In 1969, singer-songwriter Townes Van Zandt recorded his self-titled album, Townes Van Zandt, at Bradley’s Barn.

In 1970, Jerry Bradley left the studio to work with Chet Atkins at RCA Nashville, but Bradley's Barn recording studio's string of commercially-successful projects continued throughout the decade, including several hit albums featuring the duo of Loretta Lynn and Conway Twitty. In 1977, when RCA closed its Nashville studios, Owen Bradley purchased the studio equipment and sub-let the studio space. RCA Studio A was remodeled and operated as Music City Music Hall, and RCA Studio B was re-named Master Sound Studios and operated as a subsidiary of Bradley's Barn.

In October 1980, the Bradley's Barn studio in Mt. Juliet was completely destroyed by a fire. but Bradley rebuilt it on a smaller scale at the same location within a few years. In 1988, k.d. lang recorded her award-winning album, Shadowland with Owen Bradley at the studio. In 1994 Brian Ahern produced The Bradley Barn Sessions, an album of classic George Jones hit performed as duets with Marty Stuart, Alan Jackson, Ricky Skaggs, Tammy Wynette, Keith Richards, Vince Gill, Travis Tritt, Trisha Yearwood, Mark Knopfler, Mark Chesnutt, Emmylou Harris, and Dolly Parton. In 1995, Ween recorded their album 12 Golden Country Greats at the studio.

Owen Bradley died in 1998. Bradley's Barn recording studios closed in 2008.

In 2019, Jerry Bradley was a key figure in a mini-documentary about the 1975 album NASCAR Goes Country, providing interviews on its production and significance. The album, recorded at Bradley's Barn, featured cover songs performed by top NASCAR drivers of the era, including Richard Petty, Darrell Waltrip, and Cale Yarborough. Jerry Bradley’s uncle, Harold Bradley, who was also the brother of Owen Bradley, played guitar on the album.

== Reopening ==
Bradley's Barn reopened in March 2025 under the leadership of Clay Bradley, Vice President of Creative at BMI in Nashville, Tennessee, and the grandson of founder Owen Bradley. To commemorate the reopening, BMI hosted a No. 1 party celebrating country singer Lainey Wilson’s hit songs, “Wildflowers and Wild Horses” and “4x4xU,” on March 27, 2025. Owen Bradley’s great-grandchildren, Lillian Grace Bradley and John Owen Bradley, have renovated the space to preserve its legacy.
