= Walter Haynes =

American steel guitarist and music producer (1928–2009)

- Birth name: Walter Ray Haynes
- Born: December 14, 1928
- Died: January 1, 2009 (aged 80)
- Genres: Country
- Occupation(s): Musician, producer
- Instrument: Steel guitar
- Years active: 1949–2008

Walter Haynes (December 14, 1928 – January 1, 2009) was an American steel guitarist and music producer who worked with such artists as Patsy Cline, Jimmy Dickens, Del Reeves, the Everly Brothers, and Jeanne Pruett. He also co-wrote a number of songs, including "Girl on the Billboard", which became a number-one hit for Del Reeves in 1965. Haynes was a member of the Steel Guitar Hall of Fame. At the time of his death at the age of 80 in Tyler, Texas, he had been teaching music lessons in Bullard, Texas.
