= Charley Pride albums discography =

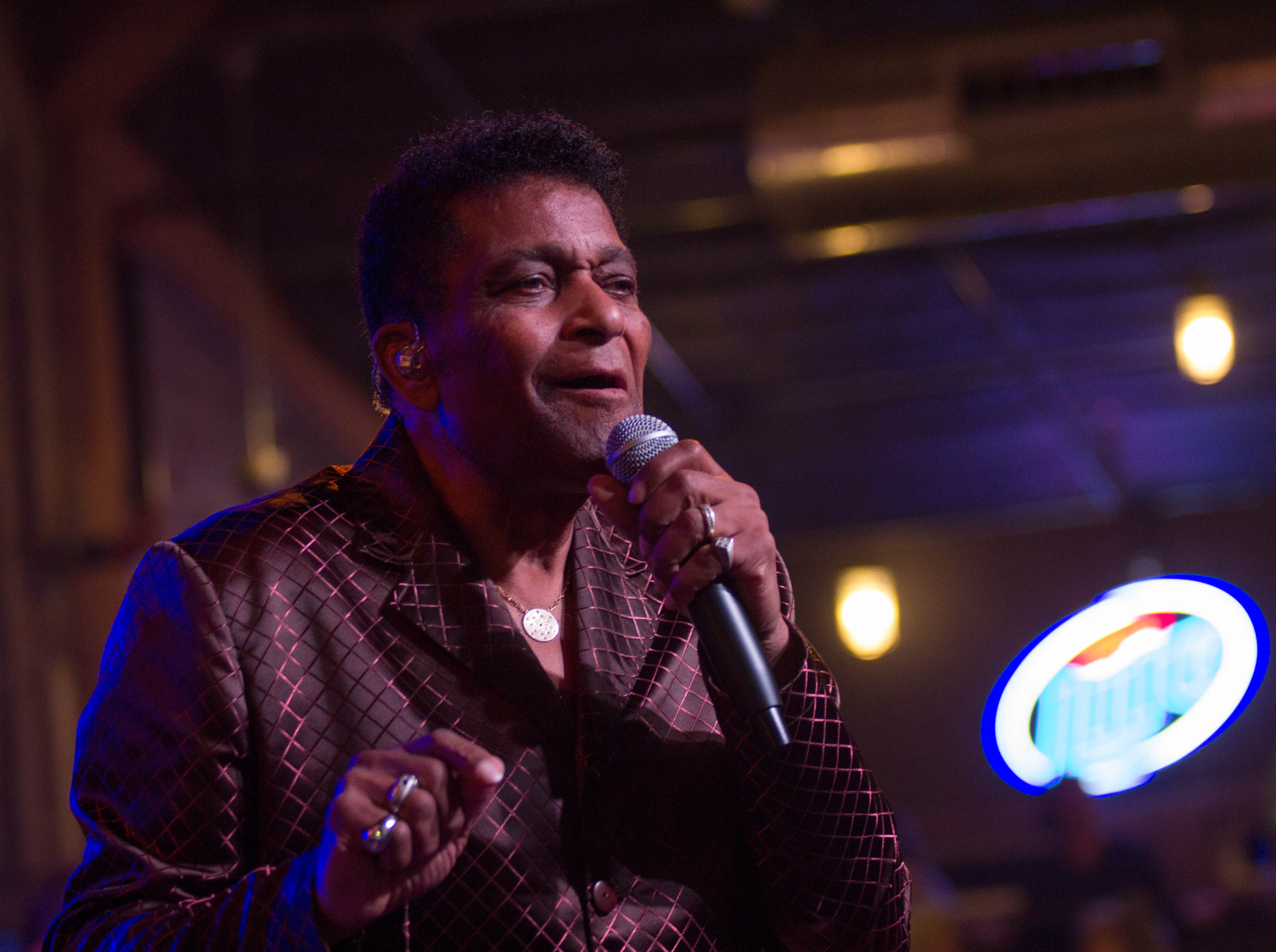
- Charley Pride, 2016
- Studio albums: 44
- Extended plays: 3
- Live albums: 3
- Compilation albums: 36
- Video albums: 7
- Other album appearances: 12

The albums discography of American country music artist Charley Pride contains 44 studio albums, three live albums, seven video albums, 36 compilation albums, three extended plays and 12 album appearances. Signing his first recording contract in 1966 with RCA Victor, he released his first album the same year called Country Charley Pride. The studio release peaked at number 16 on the Billboard country albums chart. It also sold 500,000 copies in the United States, helping it to receive a gold certification from the Recording Industry Association of America. In 1968, The Country Way (Pride's third album) topped the country albums chart and spent 42 weeks on the list. The record also certified gold. Pride continued releasing a series of studio albums in the 1960s. Both of his 1969 studio efforts would certify gold from the RIAA as well.

In the early 1970s, several of his studio albums reached the number one position on the Billboard country chart: Just Plain Charley (1970), Charley Pride's 10th Album (1970), I'm Just Me (1971), Charley Pride Sings Heart Songs (1971), A Sunshiny Day with Charley Pride (1971), Songs of Love by Charley Pride (1972) and Amazing Love (1973). These releases also charted the Billboard 200 survey. Charley Pride Sings Heart Songs was his most successful, climbing to number 38. Pride's first studio record of gospel music was issued around the same time called, Did You Think to Pray. Additionally, his first live album was also released during this period called In Person. Pride's album output grew smaller as the decade progressed, with only one or two LP released per year by 1979. These albums remained successful and reached top ten positions on the country albums chart, including The Happiness of Having You (1975), Someone Loves You Honey (1978) and Burgers and Fries (1978).

In 1980, Pride's tribute album to Hank Williams reached number one on the country albums list and spent 52 weeks charting. His 1983 album of covers tunes reached number 36 on the same survey. Disappointed with record sales, Pride left RCA in 1986 and signed with 16th Avenue Records. His first studio release with the label reached number 18 on the country chart in 1987. He released his final charting album in 1989. Pride continued recording in the 1990s after signing with Honest Entertainment. In 1996, he released an album of old and new material on the label called My 6 Latest and 6 Greatest. He continued releasing new studio material until 2018 when his final album Music in My Heart was released.

== Studio albums ==
=== 1960s ===
List of albums, with selected chart positions and certifications, showing other relevant details
Title	Album details	Peak chart positions		Certifications
Title	Album details	US	US Cou.	Certifications
Country Charley Pride	Released: September 1966; Label: RCA Victor; Formats: LP	—	16	RIAA: Gold
Pride of Country Music	Released: June 1967; Label: RCA Victor; Formats: LP	—	33	
The Country Way	Released: December 1967; Label: RCA Victor; Formats: LP	199	1	RIAA: Gold
Make Mine Country	Released: April 1968; Label: RCA Victor; Formats: LP	—	4	
Songs of Pride...Charley That Is	Released: September 1968; Label: RCA Victor; Formats: LP	—	6	
The Sensational Charley Pride	Released: May 1969; Label: RCA Victor; Formats: LP	44	2	RIAA: Gold
"—" denotes a recording that did not chart or was not released in that territory.

=== 1970s ===
List of albums, with selected chart positions and certifications, showing other relevant details
Title	Album details	Peak chart positions						Certifications
Title	Album details	US	US Cou.	CAN	CAN Cou.	NZ	UK	Certifications
Just Plain Charley	Released: January 1970; Label: RCA Victor; Formats: LP	22	1	44	—	—	—	RIAA: Gold
Charley Pride's 10th Album	Released: June 1970; Label: RCA Victor; Formats: LP	30	1	—	—	—	—	RIAA: Gold
Christmas in My Home Town	Released: November 1970; Label: RCA Victor; Formats: LP	—	—	—	—	—	—	MC: Gold
From Me to You	Released: December 1970; Label: RCA Victor; Formats: LP	42	2	—	—	—	—	RIAA: Gold
Did You Think to Pray	Released: March 1971; Label: RCA Victor; Formats: LP	76	1	4	—	—	—	RIAA: Gold
I'm Just Me	Released: June 1971; Label: RCA Victor; Formats: LP, cassette	50	1	2	—	—	—	
Charley Pride Sings Heart Songs	Released: October 1971; Label: RCA Victor; Formats: LP, cassette	38	1	—	—	—	—	RIAA: Gold
A Sunshiny Day with Charley Pride	Released: July 1972; Label: RCA Victor; Formats: LP, cassette	115	1	87	—	—	—	
Songs of Love by Charley Pride	Released: December 1972; Label: RCA Victor; Formats: LP, cassette	149	1	—	—	—	—	
Sweet Country	Released: April 1973; Label: RCA Victor; Formats: LP, cassette	166	3	32	—	—	—	
Amazing Love	Released: October 1973; Label: RCA Victor; Formats: LP, cassette	—	1	—	—	—	—	
Country Feelin'	Released: May 1974; Label: RCA Victor; Formats: LP, cassette	—	15	—	—	—	—	
Pride of America	Released: November 1974; Label: RCA Victor; Formats: LP, cassette	—	4	—	—	—	—	
Charley	Released: May 1975; Label: RCA Victor; Formats: LP, cassette	—	5	—	—	—	—	
The Happiness of Having You	Released: November 1975; Label: RCA Victor; Formats: LP, cassette	—	2	—	—	—	—	
Sunday Morning with Charley Pride	Released: April 1976; Label: RCA Victor; Formats: LP	—	14	—	—	—	—	
She's Just an Old Love Turned Memory	Released: March 1977; Label: RCA Victor; Formats: LP, cassette	—	6	—	—	—	34	
Someone Loves You Honey	Released: February 1978; Label: RCA Victor; Formats: LP, cassette	207	4	—	3	—	48	MC: Gold
Burgers and Fries/When I Stop Leaving (I'll Be Gone)	Released: October 1978; Label: RCA Victor; Formats: LP, cassette	—	7	—	4	—	—	
You're My Jamaica	Released: August 1979; Label: RCA Victor; Formats: LP, cassette	—	11	—	6	33	—	
"—" denotes a recording that did not chart or was not released in that territory.

=== 1980s ===
List of albums, with selected chart positions and certifications, showing other relevant details
Title	Album details	Peak chart positions			Certifications
Title	Album details	US	US Cou.	AUS	Certifications
There's a Little Bit of Hank in Me	Released: January 1980; Label: RCA Victor; Formats: LP, cassette	201	1	—	MC: Gold
Roll On Mississippi	Released: March 1981; Label: RCA Victor; Formats: LP, cassette	—	17	—	
Charley Sings Everybody's Choice	Released: March 1982; Label: RCA Victor; Formats: LP, cassette	—	10	95	
Country Classics	Released: March 1983; Label: RCA Victor; Formats: LP, cassette	—	36	—	
Night Games	Released: August 1983; Label: RCA Victor; Formats: LP, cassette	—	20	—	
Power of Love	Released: August 1984; Label: RCA Victor; Formats: LP, cassette	—	49	—	
The Best There Is	Released: January 1986; Label: RCA Victor; Formats: LP, cassette	—	—	—	
Back to the Country	Released: July 1986; Label: RCA Victor; Formats: LP, cassette	—	60	—	
After All This Time	Released: April 1987; Label: 16th Avenue; Formats: LP, cassette, CD	—	18	—	
I'm Gonna Love Her on the Radio	Released: February 1988; Label: 16th Avenue; Formats: LP, cassette, CD	—	36	—	
Moody Woman	Released: February 1989; Label: 16th Avenue; Formats: LP, cassette, CD	—	51	—	
"—" denotes a recording that did not chart or was not released in that territory.

=== 1990s–2010s ===
List of albums, with selected chart positions, showing other relevant details
Title	Album details	Peak chart positions
Title	Album details	NZ
My 6 Latest and 6 Greatest	Released: July 1993; Label: Honest; Formats: Cassette, CD	—
Classics with Pride	Released: May 17, 1996; Label: Honest; Formats: Cassette, CD	32
A Tribute to Jim Reeves	Released: May 15, 2001; Label: Music City; Formats: CD	—
Comfort of Her Wings	Released: May 20, 2003; Label: Music City; Formats: CD	—
Pride and Joy: A Gospel Music Collection	Released: November 7, 2006; Label: Music City; Formats: CD, music download	—
Choices	Released: March 8, 2011; Label: Music City; Formats: CD, music download	—
Music in My Heart	Released: July 7, 2017; Label: Music City; Formats: CD, music download	—
"—" denotes a recording that did not chart or was not released in that territory.

== Compilation albums ==
=== 1970s ===
List of albums, with selected chart positions and certifications, showing other relevant details
Title	Album details	Peak chart positions						Certifications
Title	Album details	US	US Cou.	AUS	CAN	NZ	UK	Certifications
The Best of Charley Pride	Released: October 1969; Label: RCA Victor; Formats: LP	24	1	—	27	—	—	MC: Platinum; RIAA: Gold
Charley Pride Special	Released: 1971; Label: RCA Victor; Formats: LP	—	—	—	—	—	29	
The Best of Charley Pride, Volume II	Released: February 1972; Label: RCA Victor; Formats: LP	50	1	—	—	—	—	RIAA: Gold
The Incomparable Charley Pride	Released: August 1972; Label: RCA Camden; Formats: LP	189	16	—	—	—	—	
Charley Pride's Greatest: 20 Country Favourites	Released: 1974; Label: RCA; Formats: LP	—	—	17	—	46	—	
A Decade of Charley Pride	Released: 1975; Label: RCA Victor; Formats: LP	—	—	21	—	5	—	
The Best of Charley Pride, Vol. III.	Released: October 1976; Label: RCA Victor; Formats: LP, cassette	188	3	—	—	—	—	MC: 4× Platinum
The Hits of Charley Pride	Released: 1976; Label: RCA Victor; Formats: LP	—	—	—	—	—	—	
On the Road with Charley Pride	Released: 1979; Label: Impact; Formats: LP	—	—	—	—	11	—	
Travellin'	Released: 1979 (Australia); Label: RCA; Formats: LP	—	—	46	—	—	—	ARIA: Platinum
"—" denotes a recording that did not chart or was not released in that territory.

=== 1980s ===
List of albums, with selected chart positions, showing other relevant details
Title	Album details	Peak chart positions				
Title	Album details	US	US Cou.	AUS	NZ	UK
Golden Collection	Released: 1980; Label: K-tel; Formats: LP	—	—	—	—	6
All I Have to Offer You Is Me	Released: 1980; Label: RCA Rockaway/Summit; Formats: LP	—	—	50	3	—
Greatest Hits	Released: September 1981; Label: RCA Victor; Formats: LP, cassette	185	8	—	—	—
The Magic of Charley Pride	Released: 1982; Label: RCA International; Formats: LP	—	—	—	—	—
All My Best	Released: 1984; Label: RCA Special Products; Formats: LP	—	—	—	—	—
Collector's Series	Released: 1985; Label: RCA Victor; Formats: LP, cassette	—	—	—	—	—
Greatest Hits, Volume 2	Released: May 1985; Label: RCA Victor; Formats: LP, cassette	—	60	—	—	—
Country Love Songs	Released: 1986; Label: Starcall Victor; Formats: LP	—	—	92	6	—
"—" denotes a recording that did not chart or was not released in that territory.

=== 1990s ===
List of albums, with selected chart positions, showing other relevant details
Title	Album details	Peak chart positions	
Title	Album details	AUS	NZ
Best of Charley Pride	Released: 1990; Label: Curb; Formats: Cassette, CD	—	—
The Silver Anniversary Album	Released: 1991; Label: Dino; Formats: Cassette, CD	51	7
Super Hits	Released: October 15, 1996; Label: RCA; Formats: CD	—	—
30 Years of Pride	Released: 1997; Label: BMG International; Formats: CD	25	9
The Essential Charley Pride	Released: April 29, 1997; Label: RCA; Formats: Cassette, CD	—	—
Greatest Hits	Released: September 8, 1998; Label: BMG; Formats: Cassette, CD	—	—
"—" denotes a recording that did not chart or was not released in that territory.

=== 2000s–2020s ===
List of albums, with selected chart positions, showing other relevant details
Title	Album details	Peak chart positions			Certifications
Title	Album details	US Cou.	AUS	NZ	Certifications
Legendary Charley Pride	Released: September 5, 2000; Label: BMG; Formats: CD	—	—	—	
RCA Country Legends: Charley Pride	Released: November 7, 2000; Label: Buddha; Formats: CD	—	—	—	
Legends	Released: September 29, 2001; Label: BMG; Formats: CD	—	—	—	
22 All-Time Greatest Hits	Released: June 17, 2003; Label: TeeVee; Formats: CD	64	—	—	
Anthology	Released: July 22, 2003; Label: RCA; Formats: CD	—	—	—	
Country Music Legend	Released: March 9, 2005; Label: Legacy; Formats: CD	—	—	—	
16 Biggest Hits	Released: March 22, 2005; Label: BMG; Formats: CD, music download	—	—	—	
Greatest Songs	Released: October 25, 2005; Label: Curb; Formats: CD	—	—	—	
The Essential Charley Pride	Released: May 30, 2006; Label: RCA; Formats: CD, music download	—	—	—	
Playlist: The Very Best of Charley Pride	Released: September 2, 2008; Label: Legacy/Sony; Formats: CD, music download	—	—	—	
40 Years of Pride	Released: June 28, 2013; Label: Sony; Formats: CD	—	—	1	ARIA: Gold
50 Golden Years of Pride	Released: November 30, 2018; Label: Sony; Formats: CD	—	67	6	
"—" denotes a recording that did not chart or was not released in that territory.

== Live albums ==
List of albums, with selected chart positions and certifications, showing other relevant details
Title	Album details	Peak chart positions		Certifications
Title	Album details	US	US Cou.	Certifications
Charley Pride in Person	Released: January 1969; Label: RCA Victor; Formats: LP	62	2	RIAA: Gold
Charley Pride Live	Released: November 1982; Label: RCA Victor; Formats: LP	—	62	
Branson City Limits	Released: March 3, 1998; Label: BMG; Formats: Cassette, CD	—	—	
"—" denotes a recording that did not chart or was not released in that territory.

== Extended plays ==
List of extended plays, showing certifications and all relevant details
Title	Album details
The Best of Charley Pride	Released: March 1971; Label: RCA Victor; Formats: EP
Charley Pride in Person	Released: January 1972; Label: RCA Victor; Formats: EP
Charley Pride Sings Heart Songs	Released: November 1972; Label: RCA Victor; Formats: EP
Help Me Make It Through the Night	Released: 1975; Label: RCA Victor; Formats: EP

== Video albums ==
List of albums, showing certifications and all relevant details
Title	Album details	Certifications
In Concert	Released: 1977; Label: Prime Concerts; Formats: DVD	
Live!	Released: March 23, 1993; Label: Lightyear; Formats: VHS	
There Goes My Everything: In Concert	Released: June 4, 2002; Label: Unlimited Media; Formats: DVD	
Live in Concert: March 15, 1975	Released: January 13, 2008; Label: Forever DVD/Musicpro; Formats: DVD	
In Concert (with Charlie Rich)	Released: November 21, 2008; Label: Immortal; Formats: DVD	
Charley Pride Live in Canada	Released: November 28, 2006; Label: Pillar; Formats: DVD	MC: Platinum
Country Family Reunion Tribute Series (with Crystal Gayle)	Released: February 26, 2016; Label: Team Marketing; Formats: DVD	

== Other album appearances ==
List of non-single guest appearances, with other performing artists, showing year released and album name
Title	Year	Other artist(s)	Album	Ref.
"You Never Even Called Me by My Name"	1994	Doug Supernaw; David Allan Coe; Waylon Jennings; Merle Haggard	Deep Thoughts from a Shallow Mind	
"Kiss an Angel"	2000	Carlton Pride and Zion	What You Need	
"All American Music"	2004	Jamie Reno	All American Music	
"Kiss an Angel Good Morning"	2005	Daniel O'Donnell	Live from Branson	
"You're My Jamaica"	2005	Neal McCoy	That's Life	
"Party Dolls and Wine"	2007	Red Steagall	Here We Go Again	
"Crystal Chandeliers"	2008	Daniel O'Donnell	A Country Boy	
"Family Bible"	2010	George Hamilton IV	Old Fashioned Hymns and Gospel Songs... (For Those Who Miss Them!)	
"Crystal Chandeliers" (Live)	2011	Daniel O'Donnell	Live from Nashville	
"Burgers and Fries"	2017	Brett Kissel	We Were That Song	
"Why Things Happen"	2020	Jimmie Allen; Darius Rucker	Bettie James	
"Where the Cross Don't Burn"	2020	Garth Brooks	Fun	
