= The Best of Charley Pride =

Compilation album by Charley Pride
- Released: October 1969
- Genre: Country
- Label: RCA Victor
- Producer: Bob Ferguson, Chet Atkins, Felton Jarvis, Jack Clement

Charley Pride chronology
The Sensational Charley Pride (1969)	The Best of Charley Pride (1969)	Just Plain Charley (1970)

Singles from The Best of Charley Pride
- 1. "All I Have to Offer You (Is Me)" Released: June 1969

The Best of Charley Pride is the first compilation album by American country music artist Charley Pride. It was released on the RCA Victor label (catalog no. LSP-4223). It debuted on Billboard magazine's country album chart on November 1, 1969, peaked at No. 1, and remained on the chart for 84 weeks.

It ranked third in sales among all albums released by Pride during his career, trailing only The Best of Charley Pride, Volume II and Charley Pride Sings Heart Songs.

== Track listing ==
No.	Title	Writer(s)	Length
1.	"Just Between You and Me"	Jack Clement	2:13
2.	"Does My Ring Hurt Your Finger"	Don Robertson, Clement, Jerry Crutchfield	2:16
3.	"Kaw-Liga"	Fred Rose, Hank Williams	3:00
4.	"The Snakes Crawl at Night"	Fred Burch, Mel Tillis	2:46
5.	"All I Have to Offer You (Is Me)"	A.L. "Doodle" Owens, Dallas Frazier	3:00
6.	"The Easy Part's Over"	Rice, Foster	2:20
7.	"The Day the World Stood Still"	Rice, Foster	2:30
8.	"I Know One"	Clement	2:23
9.	"Gone, On The Other Hand"	Clement	2:29
10.	"Before I Met You"	Chuck Seitz, Elmer Rader, Joe Lewis	2:26
11.	"Too Hard to Say I'm Sorry"	Clement, Jack D. Johnson	2:32
12.	"Let the Chips Fall"	Clement	2:40

== Charts ==
=== Weekly charts ===
Chart (1969)	Peak position
US Billboard 200	24
US Top Country Albums (Billboard)	1

=== Year-end charts ===
Chart (1970)	Position
US Top Country Albums (Billboard)	1
