= Greatest Hits (Charley Pride album) =

Greatest hits album by Charley Pride
- Released: September 1981
- Genre: Country
- Length: 32:41
- Label: RCA Victor
- Producer: Charley Pride, Jerry Bradley, Norro Wilson

Charley Pride chronology
Roll On Mississippi (1981)	Greatest Hits (1981)	Charley Sings Everybody's Choice (1982)

Greatest Hits is a compilation album by American country music artist Charley Pride, released in September 1981 by RCA Records. The album includes the single "Never Been So Loved (In All My Life)".

== Track listing ==
No.	Title	Writer(s)	Length
1.	"Never Been So Loved (In All My Life)"	Wayland Holyfield, Norro Wilson	3:01
2.	"Missin' You"	Kye Fleming Dennis Morgan	2:26
3.	"You're My Jamaica"	Kent Robbins	3:31
4.	"When I Stop Leaving (I'll Be Gone)"	Robbins	2:33
5.	"Honky Tonk Blues"	Hank Williams	1:59
6.	"Burgers and Fries"	Ben Peters	3:11
7.	"Roll On Mississippi"	Fleming, Morgan	3:31
8.	"A Whole Lotta Things to Sing About"	Peters	2:43
9.	"She's Just an Old Love Turned Memory"	John Schweers	2:35
10.	"Someone Loves You Honey"	Don Devaney	2:08
11.	"Where Do I Put Her Memory"	Jim Weatherly	4:02

== Chart performance ==
Chart (1981)	Peak position
US Billboard 200	185
US Top Country Albums (Billboard)	8
