= List of Top Country LP's number ones of 1970 =

Merle Haggard topped the chart with the live albums Okie from Muskogee, and The Fightin' Side of Me, each named for one of his best-known songs.

Top Country Albums is a chart that ranks the top-performing country music albums in the United States, published by Billboard. In 1970, 10 different albums topped the chart, which was at the time published under the title Top Country LP's, based on sales reports submitted by a representative sample of stores nationwide.

In the issue of Billboard dated January 3, Charley Pride was at number one with the compilation album The Best of Charley Pride, the record's third week in the top spot. It remained the atop the chart for a further 10 weeks before being displaced by Okie from Muskogee by Merle Haggard. Pride would go on to achieve two further number ones during the year. In the issue of Billboard dated April 25, six weeks after his compilation album vacated the top spot, he returned to the peak position with the album Just Plain Charley, which spent nine non-consecutive weeks atop the listing. Just three weeks after that album fell from number one for the second time, he was back atop the chart with Charley Pride's 10th Album. In total, Pride spent 28 weeks at number one during the year, more than twice as many as any other act. The first African-American performer to become a major star in the country music field, Pride was at the peak of his success between 1969 and 1971, when he achieved a succession of number-one singles as well as his chart-topping albums.

In addition to Pride, Haggard and Johnny Cash each had more than one number one during the year. Haggard followed Okie from Muskogee, which spent five non-consecutive weeks at number one, with The Fightin' Side of Me, which had a seven-week run atop the listing in the fall. Both albums were live recordings hurriedly released to cash in on the popularity of their respective title songs, both of which topped the country singles chart. Cash topped the albums listing with Hello, I'm Johnny Cash in March and The Johnny Cash Show in December. The latter album, released to tie in with his TV series of the same title which ran from June 7, 1969 to March 31, 1971 on ABC, was the year's final chart-topper. In the fall Conway Twitty achieved his first number-one album when Hello Darlin' topped the chart for a single week. Having experienced success with rock and roll recordings in the 1950s, Twitty had switched to country music in the mid-1960s and would go on to become one of the genre's most successful singers of all time, topping the singles chart a record-breaking 40 times.

== Chart history ==
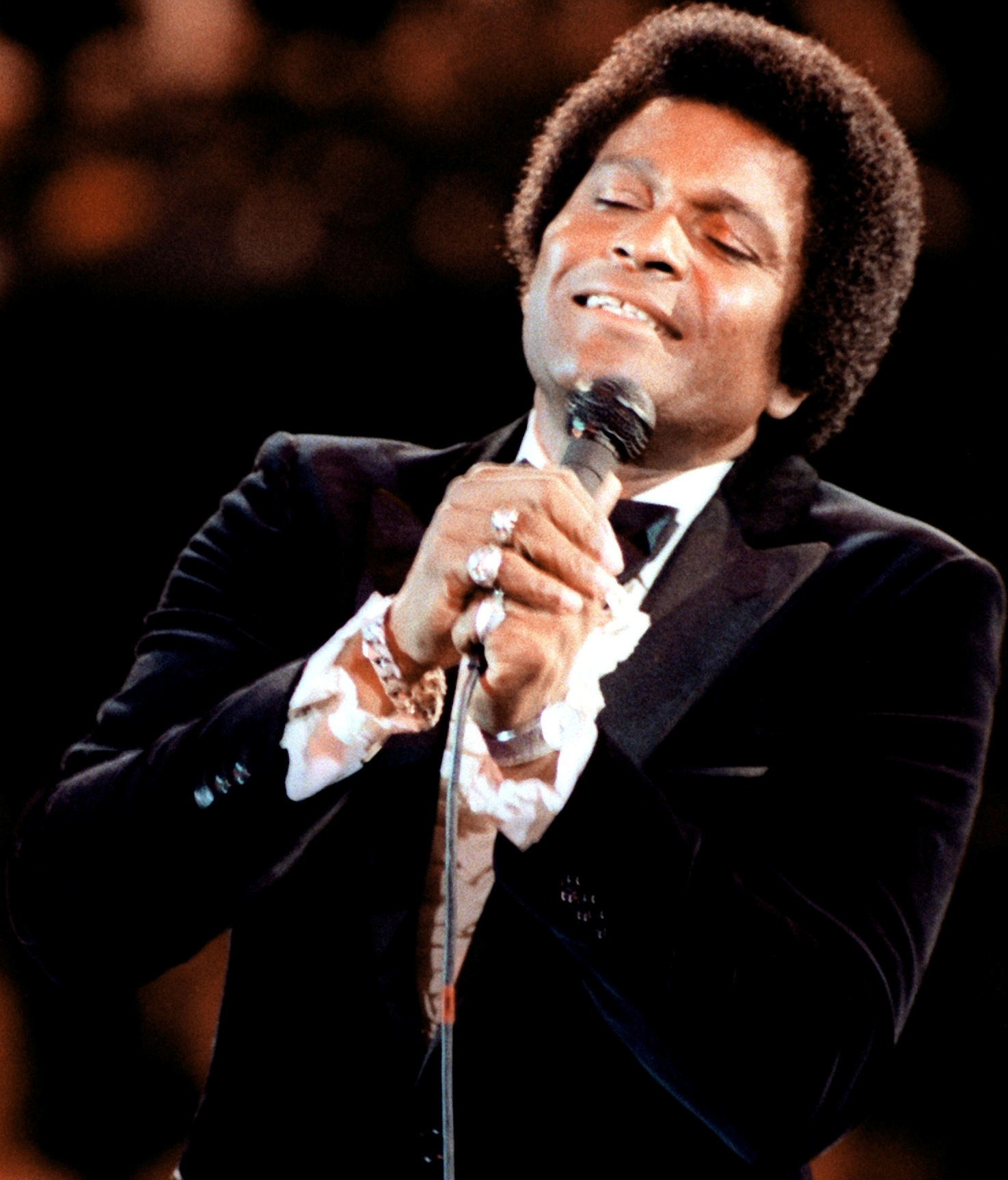
Three albums by Charley Pride spent time at number one in 1970.

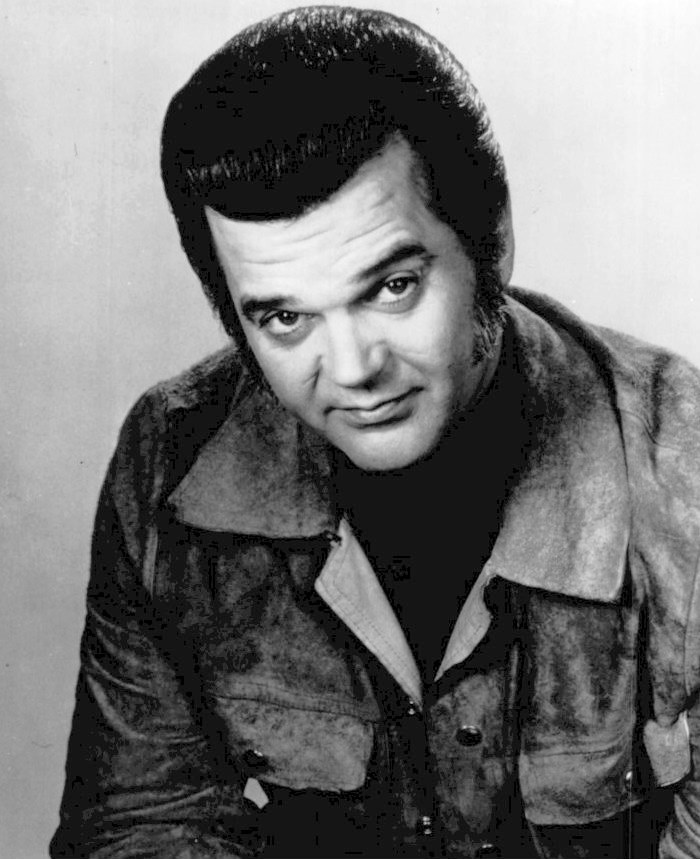
Hello Darlin' was the first album by Conway Twitty to top the chart.

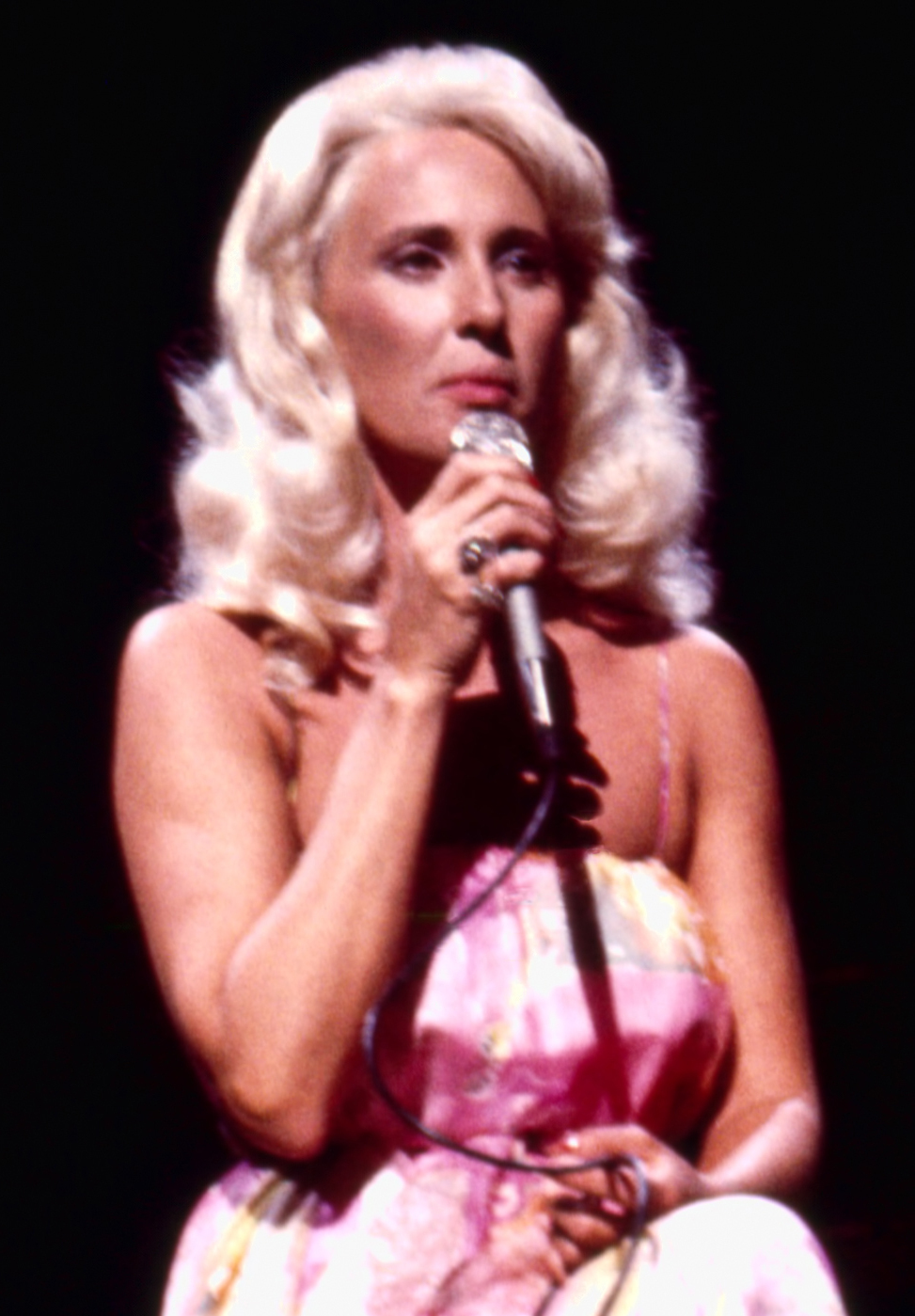
Tammy Wynette was the only female performer to top the chart in 1970.

Issue date	Title	Artist(s)	Ref.
January 3	The Best of Charley Pride	Charley Pride	
January 10	The Best of Charley Pride	Charley Pride	
January 17	The Best of Charley Pride	Charley Pride	
January 24	The Best of Charley Pride	Charley Pride	
January 31	The Best of Charley Pride	Charley Pride	
February 7	The Best of Charley Pride	Charley Pride	
February 14	The Best of Charley Pride	Charley Pride	
February 21	The Best of Charley Pride	Charley Pride	
February 28	The Best of Charley Pride	Charley Pride	
March 7	The Best of Charley Pride	Charley Pride	
March 14	The Best of Charley Pride	Charley Pride	
March 21	Okie from Muskogee	Merle Haggard and the Strangers	
March 28	Hello, I'm Johnny Cash	Johnny Cash	
April 4	Hello, I'm Johnny Cash	Johnny Cash	
April 11	Hello, I'm Johnny Cash	Johnny Cash	
April 18	Hello, I'm Johnny Cash	Johnny Cash	
April 25	Just Plain Charley	Charley Pride	
May 2	Just Plain Charley	Charley Pride	
May 9	Okie from Muskogee	Merle Haggard	
May 16	Okie from Muskogee	Merle Haggard	
May 23	Okie from Muskogee	Merle Haggard	
May 30	Okie from Muskogee	Merle Haggard	
June 6	Just Plain Charley	Charley Pride	
June 13	Just Plain Charley	Charley Pride	
June 20	Just Plain Charley	Charley Pride	
June 27	Just Plain Charley	Charley Pride	
July 4	Just Plain Charley	Charley Pride	
July 11	Just Plain Charley	Charley Pride	
July 18	Just Plain Charley	Charley Pride	
July 25	Tammy's Touch	Tammy Wynette	
August 1	Tammy's Touch	Tammy Wynette	
August 8	Charley Pride's 10th Album	Charley Pride	
August 15	Charley Pride's 10th Album	Charley Pride	
August 22	Charley Pride's 10th Album	Charley Pride	
August 29	Charley Pride's 10th Album	Charley Pride	
September 5	Charley Pride's 10th Album	Charley Pride	
September 12	Charley Pride's 10th Album	Charley Pride	
September 19	Charley Pride's 10th Album	Charley Pride	
September 26	Charley Pride's 10th Album	Charley Pride	
October 3	Hello Darlin'	Conway Twitty	
October 10	The Fightin' Side of Me	Merle Haggard	
October 17	The Fightin' Side of Me	Merle Haggard	
October 24	The Fightin' Side of Me	Merle Haggard	
October 31	The Fightin' Side of Me	Merle Haggard	
November 7	The Fightin' Side of Me	Merle Haggard	
November 14	The Fightin' Side of Me	Merle Haggard	
November 21	The Fightin' Side of Me	Merle Haggard	
November 28	For the Good Times	Ray Price	
December 5	For the Good Times	Ray Price	
December 12	For the Good Times	Ray Price	
December 19	The Johnny Cash Show	Johnny Cash	
December 26	The Johnny Cash Show	Johnny Cash	
