= 1969 Country Music Association Awards =

Music award ceremony

- Date: October 15, 1969
- Location: Ryman Auditorium, Nashville, Tennessee
- Hosted by: Dale Evans; Roy Rogers
- Most wins: Johnny Cash (5)
- Most nominations: Johnny Cash (6)

Television/radio coverage
- Network: NBC

The 1969 Country Music Association Awards, 3rd Ceremony, was held on October 15, 1969, at the Ryman Auditorium, Nashville, Tennessee, and was hosted by Dale Evans and Roy Rogers.

== Winners and nominees ==
Winners in Bold.

Entertainer of the Year	Album of the Year
**Johnny Cash**; Glen Campbell; Roy Clark; Merle Haggard; Charley Pride	**At San Quentin — Johnny Cash**; Charley Pride in Person — Charley Pride; Same Train, a Different Time — Merle Haggard; Stand by Your Man — Tammy Wynette; Wichita Lineman — Glen Campbell
Male Vocalist of the Year	Female Vocalist of the Year
**Johnny Cash**; Glen Campbell; Merle Haggard; Sonny James; Charley Pride	**Tammy Wynette**; Lynn Anderson; Loretta Lynn; Dolly Parton; Jeannie C. Riley
Vocal Group of the Year	Comedian of the Year
**Johnny Cash and June Carter Cash**; Glen Campbell and Bobbie Gentry; Don Gibson and Dottie West; Tompall & the Glaser Brothers; Porter Wagoner and Dolly Parton	**Archie Campbell**; Don Bowman; Roy Clark; Ben Colder; Junior Samples
Single of the Year	Song of the Year
**"A Boy Named Sue" — Johnny Cash**; "All I Have to Offer You (Is Me)" — Charley Pride; "Daddy Sang Bass" — Johnny Cash; "Galveston" — Glen Campbell; "Games People Play" — Freddy Weller	**"The Carroll County Accident" — Bob Ferguson**; "Daddy Sang Bass" — Carl Perkins; "Darling You Know I Wouldn't Lie" — Wayne Kemp, Red Lane; "Stand by Your Man" — Billy Sherrill, Tammy Wynette; "When the Grass Grows Over Me" — Don Chapel
Instrumental Group of the Year	Instrumentalist of the Year
**Danny Davis and the Nashville Brass**; The Buckaroos; Po' Boys; The Stonemans; Texas Troubadours; Wagon Masters	**Chet Atkins**; Roy Clark; Floyd Cramer; Jerry Reed; Don Rich

== Hall of Fame ==
Country Music Hall of Fame Inductees
- Gene Autry
