= You're My Jamaica =

You're My Jamaica may refer to:

- You're My Jamaica (song), a 1979 single by Charley Pride
- You're My Jamaica (album), a 1979 album by Charley Pride
