= List of Top Country LP's number ones of 1972 =

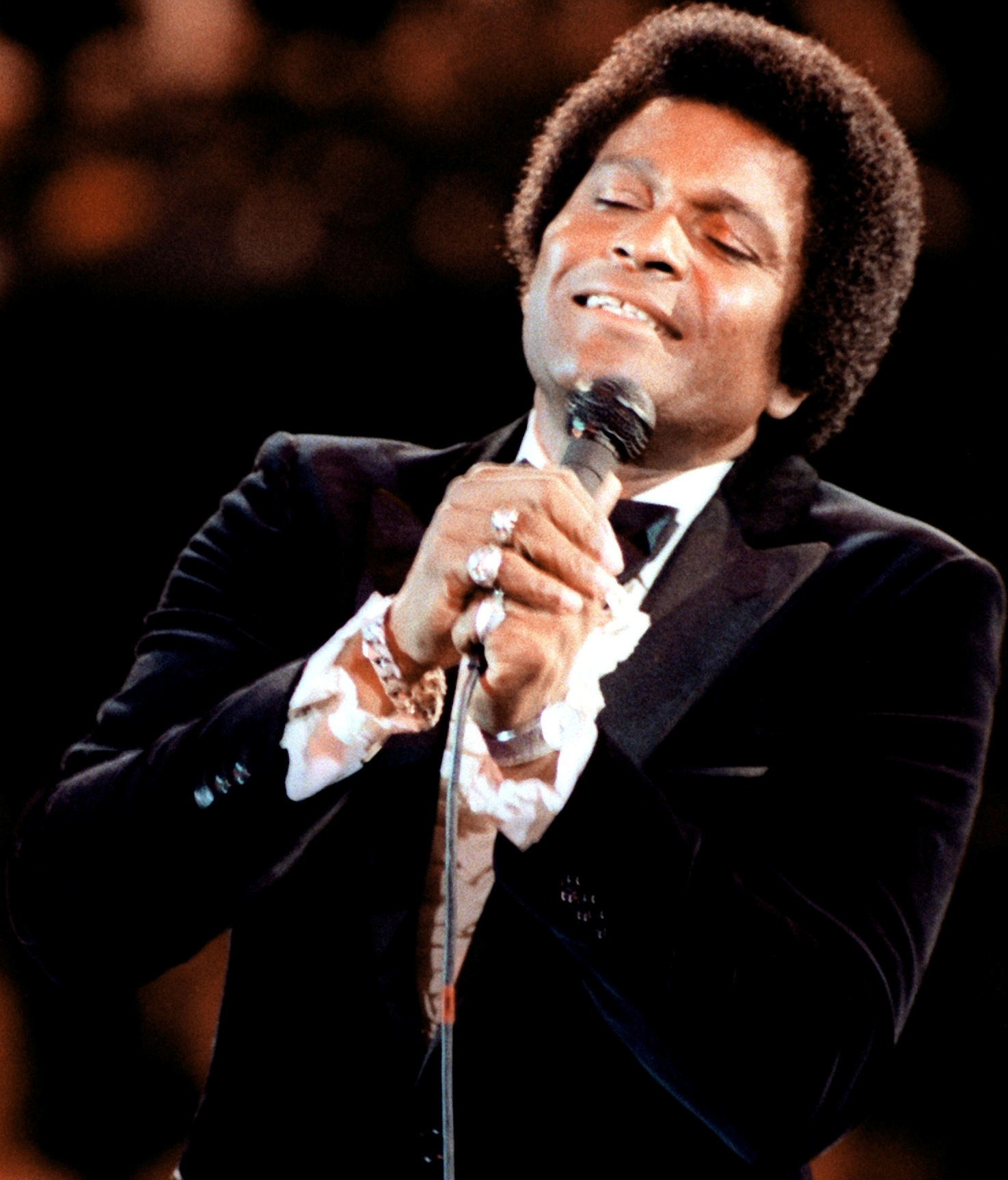
Charley Pride occupied the number-one position for all but 11 weeks of 1972.

Top Country Albums is a chart that ranks the top-performing country music albums in the United States, published by Billboard. In 1972, six different albums topped the chart, which was at the time published under the title Top Country LP's, based on sales reports submitted by a representative sample of stores nationwide.

In the issue of Billboard dated January 1, Charley Pride's album Charley Pride Sings Heart Songs climbed one place to number one, displacing the final chart-topper of 1971, Freddie Hart's Easy Loving. Pride's album remained in the top spot through the issue dated April 15, a total of 16 consecutive weeks at number one. When it was eventually displaced from the top spot, it was by the compilation album The Best of Charley Pride, Volume II, which also spent 16 weeks at number one. Pride, therefore, topped the chart without interruption for 32 consecutive weeks. After five weeks out of the top spot, Pride returned to number one with A Sunshiny Day with Charley Pride, which spent 10 weeks atop the chart, giving him a total of 42 weeks at number one in 1972. The first African-American performer to become a major star in the country music field, Pride was at the peak of his success between 1969 and 1972, when he achieved a succession of number one singles as well as his chart-topping albums.

Pride's 32-week run at number one was ended in August by The Happiest Girl in the Whole U.S.A. by Donna Fargo, which spent four weeks in the top spot. Although Fargo had won the award for Most Promising Female Vocalist from the Academy of Country Music in 1970, she did not achieve chart success until 1972, when the song "The Happiest Girl in the Whole U.S.A." reached number one on the Hot Country Singles listing. Its namesake LP topped the albums chart two months later. Between Fargo's spell at number one and Pride's return to the top spot, Jerry Wallace topped the chart for a single week with To Get to You. Wallace had begun his career as a pop singer in the 1950s before moving into the country genre in the mid-1960s, but had experienced little success until 1972, when he topped both the singles and albums charts. Legal problems and frequent changes of record label, however, meant that his run of high chart placings was short-lived. The year's final chart-topping country album was Merle Haggard's compilation The Best of the Best of Merle Haggard, which spent the final six weeks of 1972 at number one.

== Chart history ==
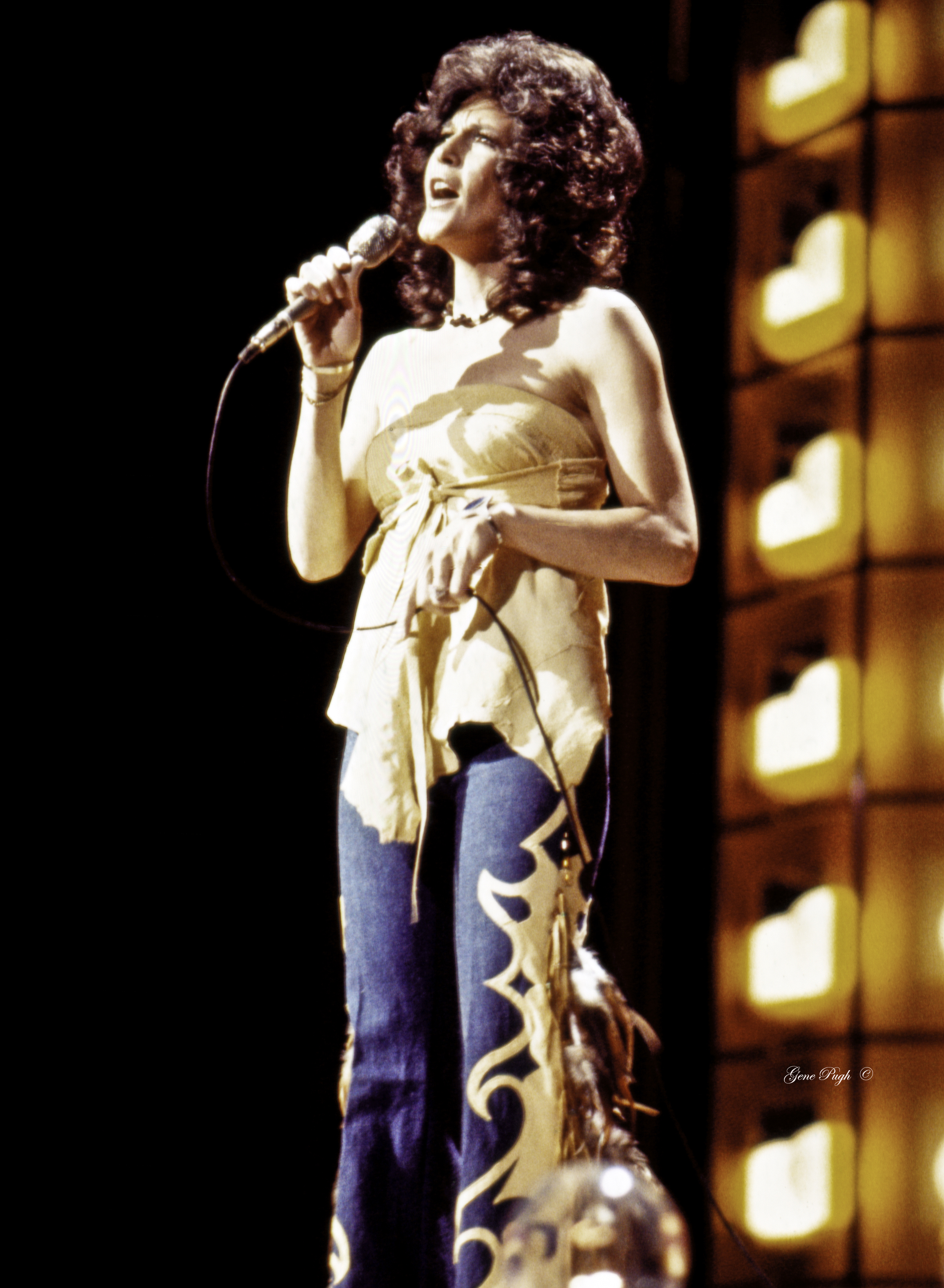
Donna Fargo's album The Happiest Girl in the Whole U.S.A. ended Charley Pride's 32-week hold on the number-one position.

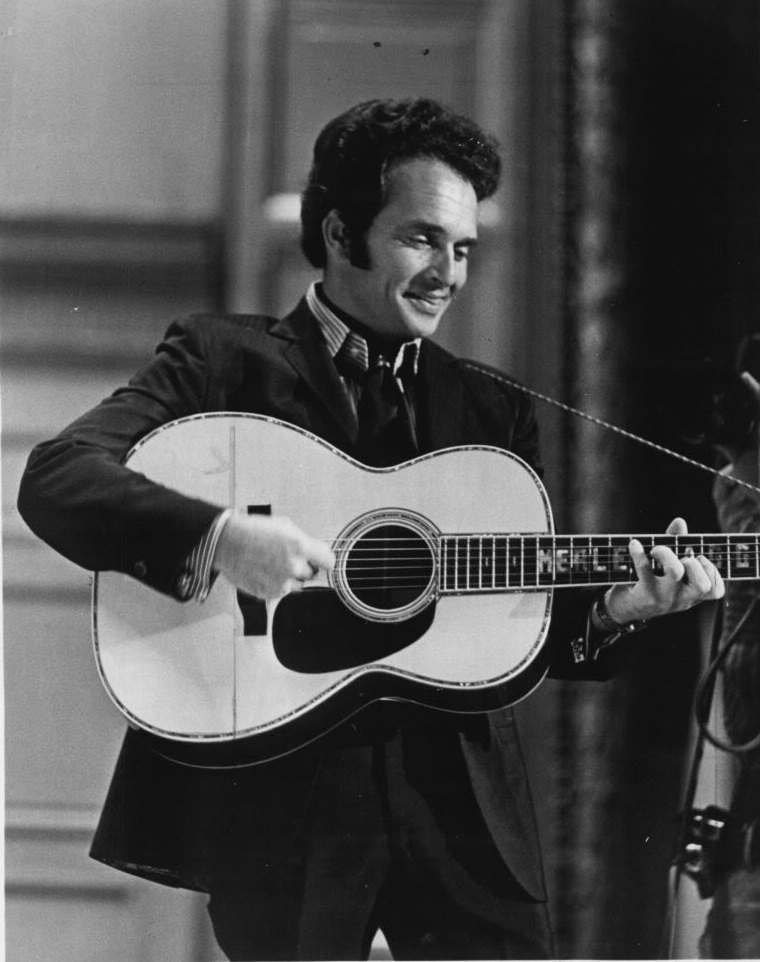
Merle Haggard spent the final six weeks of 1972 at number one with the compilation album The Best of the Best of Merle Haggard.

Issue date	Title	Artist(s)	Ref.
January 1	Charley Pride Sings Heart Songs	Charley Pride	
January 8	Charley Pride Sings Heart Songs	Charley Pride	
January 15	Charley Pride Sings Heart Songs	Charley Pride	
January 22	Charley Pride Sings Heart Songs	Charley Pride	
January 29	Charley Pride Sings Heart Songs	Charley Pride	
February 5	Charley Pride Sings Heart Songs	Charley Pride	
February 12	Charley Pride Sings Heart Songs	Charley Pride	
February 19	Charley Pride Sings Heart Songs	Charley Pride	
February 26	Charley Pride Sings Heart Songs	Charley Pride	
March 4	Charley Pride Sings Heart Songs	Charley Pride	
March 11	Charley Pride Sings Heart Songs	Charley Pride	
March 18	Charley Pride Sings Heart Songs	Charley Pride	
March 25	Charley Pride Sings Heart Songs	Charley Pride	
April 1	Charley Pride Sings Heart Songs	Charley Pride	
April 8	Charley Pride Sings Heart Songs	Charley Pride	
April 15	Charley Pride Sings Heart Songs	Charley Pride	
April 22	The Best of Charley Pride, Volume II	Charley Pride	
April 29	The Best of Charley Pride, Volume II	Charley Pride	
May 6	The Best of Charley Pride, Volume II	Charley Pride	
May 13	The Best of Charley Pride, Volume II	Charley Pride	
May 20	The Best of Charley Pride, Volume II	Charley Pride	
May 27	The Best of Charley Pride, Volume II	Charley Pride	
June 3	The Best of Charley Pride, Volume II	Charley Pride	
June 10	The Best of Charley Pride, Volume II	Charley Pride	
June 17	The Best of Charley Pride, Volume II	Charley Pride	
June 24	The Best of Charley Pride, Volume II	Charley Pride	
July 1	The Best of Charley Pride, Volume II	Charley Pride	
July 8	The Best of Charley Pride, Volume II	Charley Pride	
July 15	The Best of Charley Pride, Volume II	Charley Pride	
July 22	The Best of Charley Pride, Volume II	Charley Pride	
July 29	The Best of Charley Pride, Volume II	Charley Pride	
August 5	The Best of Charley Pride, Volume II	Charley Pride	
August 12	The Happiest Girl in the Whole U.S.A.	Donna Fargo	
August 19	The Happiest Girl in the Whole U.S.A.	Donna Fargo	
August 26	The Happiest Girl in the Whole U.S.A.	Donna Fargo	
September 2	The Happiest Girl in the Whole U.S.A.	Donna Fargo	
September 9	To Get to You	Jerry Wallace	
September 16	A Sunshiny Day with Charley Pride	Charley Pride	
September 23	A Sunshiny Day with Charley Pride	Charley Pride	
September 30	A Sunshiny Day with Charley Pride	Charley Pride	
October 7	A Sunshiny Day with Charley Pride	Charley Pride	
October 14	A Sunshiny Day with Charley Pride	Charley Pride	
October 21	A Sunshiny Day with Charley Pride	Charley Pride	
October 28	A Sunshiny Day with Charley Pride	Charley Pride	
November 4	A Sunshiny Day with Charley Pride	Charley Pride	
November 11	A Sunshiny Day with Charley Pride	Charley Pride	
November 18	A Sunshiny Day with Charley Pride	Charley Pride	
November 25	The Best of the Best of Merle Haggard	Merle Haggard	
December 2	The Best of the Best of Merle Haggard	Merle Haggard	
December 9	The Best of the Best of Merle Haggard	Merle Haggard	
December 16	The Best of the Best of Merle Haggard	Merle Haggard	
December 23	The Best of the Best of Merle Haggard	Merle Haggard	
December 30	The Best of the Best of Merle Haggard	Merle Haggard	
