= 1970 Country Music Association Awards =

Music award ceremony

- Date: October 14, 1970
- Location: Ryman Auditorium, Nashville, Tennessee
- Hosted by: Tennessee Ernie Ford
- Most wins: Merle Haggard (4)
- Most nominations: Merle Haggard (9)

Television/radio coverage
- Network: NBC

The 1971 Country Music Association Awards, 4th Ceremony, was held on October 14, 1970, at the Ryman Auditorium, Nashville, Tennessee, and was hosted by Tennessee Ernie Ford.

== Winners and nominees ==
Winners in Bold.

| Entertainer of the Year | Album of the Year |
|---|---|
| **Merle Haggard**; Glen Campbell; Johnny Cash; Roy Clark; Charley Pride | **Okie from Muskogee — Merle Haggard**; Hello Darlin' — Conway Twitty; Hello, I'm Johnny Cash — Johnny Cash; Just Plain Charley — Charley Pride; The Fightin' Side of Me — Merle Haggard |
| Male Vocalist of the Year | Female Vocalist of the Year |
| **Merle Haggard**; Johnny Cash; Charley Pride; Marty Robbins; Conway Twitty | **Tammy Wynette**; Lynn Anderson; Loretta Lynn; Dolly Parton; Connie Smith |
| Vocal Group of the Year | Vocal Duo of the Year |
| **Tompall & the Glaser Brothers**; The Carter Family; Jack Blanchard & Misty Morgan; The Osborne Brothers | **Porter Wagoner and Dolly Parton**; Bill Anderson and Jan Howard; Johnny Cash and June Carter Cash; Don Gibson and Dottie West; Merle Haggard and Bonnie Owens |
| Single of the Year | Song of the Year |
| **"Okie from Muskogee" — Merle Haggard**; "Hello Darlin'" — Conway Twitty; "(I'm So) Afraid of Losing You Again" — Charley Pride; "My Woman, My Woman, My Wife" — Marty Robbins; "The Fightin' Side of Me" — Merle Haggard | **"Sunday Morning Coming Down" — Kris Kristofferson**; "Hello Darlin'" — Conway Twitty; "My Woman, My Woman, My Wife" — Marty Robbins; "Okie from Muskogee" — Merle Haggard; "The Fightin' Side of Me" — Merle Haggard |
| Instrumental Group of the Year | Instrumentalist of the Year |
| **Danny Davis and the Nashville Brass**; The Buckaroos; The Stoneman Family; The Strangers; Wagon Masters | **Jerry Reed**; Chet Atkins; Roy Clark; Floyd Cramer; Merle Travis |
Comedian of the Year
**Roy Clark**; Archie Campbell; Ben Colder; Grandpa Jones; Junior Samples

== Hall of Fame ==
Country Music Hall of Fame Inductees
- The Carter Family
- Bill Monroe
