= Sweet Country =

Sweet Country can refer to:

- Sweet Country (album), a 1973 album by Charley Pride.
- Sweet Country (1987 film), a 1987 American film about the 1973 coup in Chile.
- Sweet Country (2017 film), a 2017 Australian film set in 1929 with an Aboriginal man accused of murder.
