= She's Too Good to Be True =

"She's Too Good to Be True" may refer to:

- "She's Too Good to Be True" (Charley Pride song)
- "She's Too Good to Be True" (Exile song)
