= There's a Little Bit of Hank in Me =

Studio album by Charley Pride
- Released: January 1980
- Genre: Country
- Length: 29:49
- Label: RCA Victor
- Producer: Jerry Bradley; Charley Pride

Charley Pride chronology
You're My Jamaica (1979)	There's a Little Bit of Hank in Me (1980)	Roll On Mississippi (1981)

Professional ratings
Review scores
Source	Rating
AllMusic	3/5 stars

There's a Little Bit of Hank in Me is a studio album by American country music artist Charley Pride. It was released in 1980 by RCA Records. The album peaked at number 1 on the Billboard Top Country Albums chart and features Pride performing songs previously written and recorded by Hank Williams Sr.

== Track listing ==
All songs written by Hank Williams, except where noted.

No.	Title	Writer(s)	Length
1.	"There's a Little Bit of Hank in Me"	John Schweers	2:35
2.	"My Son Calls Another Man Daddy"	Williams, Jewell House	2:54
3.	"Moanin' the Blues"		2:13
4.	"A Mansion on the Hill"	Williams, Fred Rose	2:38
5.	"Mind Your Own Business"		2:38
6.	"I Can't Help It (If I'm Still in Love with You)"		2:34
7.	"Honky Tonk Blues"		1:59
8.	"I'm So Lonesome I Could Cry"		2:40
9.	"Low Down Blues"		1:37
10.	"I Could Never Be Ashamed of You"		2:34
11.	"Why Don't You Love Me"		2:25
12.	"You Win Again"		3:01

== Chart performance ==
Chart (1980)	Peak position
U.S. Billboard Top Country Albums	1
