= You Almost Slipped My Mind =

Single by Charley Pride

from the album Roll On Mississippi
- B-side: "Ghost-Written Love Letters"
- Released: September 1980
- Genre: Country
- Length: 2:46
- Label: RCA
- Songwriter(s): Troy Seals; Don Goodman; Tilden Back; Delbert Barker
- Producer(s): Jerry Bradley; Charley Pride

Charley Pride singles chronology
"You Win Again" (1980)	"You Almost Slipped My Mind" (1980)	"Roll On Mississippi" (1981)

"You Almost Slipped My Mind" is a single by American country music artist Kenny Price. It was released in March 1972 as the only single from his album of the same name. The song peaked at number 44 on the Billboard Hot Country Singles chart.

The song was also recorded by American country music artist Charley Pride. Pride's version released in September 1980 as the first single from his album Roll On Mississippi. It peaked at number 4 on the Billboard Hot Country Singles chart.

== Chart performance ==
=== Charley Pride ===
Chart (1980)	Peak position
US Hot Country Songs (Billboard)	4
Canadian RPM Country Tracks	5
