= A Shoulder to Cry On (Charley Pride song) =

Single by Charley Pride

from the album Sweet Country
- B-side: "I'm Learning to Love Her"
- Released: January 1973
- Genre: Country
- Length: 3:08
- Label: RCA
- Songwriter(s): Merle Haggard
- Producer(s): Jack Clement

Charley Pride singles chronology
"She's Too Good to Be True" (1972)	"A Shoulder to Cry On" (1973)	"Don't Fight the Feelings of Love" (1973)

"A Shoulder to Cry On" is a song written by Merle Haggard, and recorded by American country music artist Charley Pride. It was released in January 1973 as the first single from the album Sweet Country. The song was Pride's eleventh number one on the country charts. The single stayed at number one for a single week and spent thirteen weeks on the country chart.

== Chart performance ==
Chart (1973)	Peak position
US Hot Country Songs (Billboard)	1
US Bubbling Under Hot 100 Singles (Billboard)	1
Canadian RPM Country Tracks	1
