= Let the Chips Fall =

Single by Charley Pride

from the album The Sensational Charley Pride
- B-side: "She Made Me Go"
- Released: September 1968
- Recorded: April 24, 1968
- Studio: RCA Studio A, Nashville, Tennessee
- Genre: Country; traditional country
- Length: 2:40
- Label: RCA Victor
- Songwriter: Jack Clement
- Producers: Jack Clement; Felton Jarvis

Charley Pride singles chronology
"The Easy Part's Over" (1968)	"Let the Chips Fall" (1968)	"Kaw-Liga" (1969)

"Let the Chips Fall" is a song written by Jack Clement, and recorded by American country music artist Charley Pride. It was released in September 1968 as the first single from the album The Sensational Charley Pride. The song was Pride's eighth single and his sixth major hit as a recording artist.

== Background ==
Under the supervision and guidance of Jack Clement, Charley Pride became country music's first commercially successful African-American recording artist. With his first two singles failing to become successful, Pride finally had his first major hit in 1967 with "Just Between You and Me." He would have several more top ten hits that followed this hit, including "The Easy Part's Over." The song was composed by Clement as well. The song was recorded on April 24, 1968 at the RCA Victor Studio. The track, "My Heart Is a House", was recorded during the same session. Jack Clement co-produced the song, along with Felton Jarvis serving as co-producer.

== Release and reception ==
"Let the Chips Fall" was released as a single via RCA Victor Records in September 1968. It was Pride's eighth single released in his music career. It spent a total of 14 weeks on the Billboard Hot Country Songs chart and peaked at number four on the list in November 1968. The song was Pride's sixth major hit in a row up to that point. His next single would be his first to top the country charts. In addition, it also became a hit in Canada, also reaching number three on the RPM Country Singles chart in 1968. It was later released on Pride's 1969 studio album on RCA titled The Sensational Charley Pride.

== Track listings ==
7" vinyl single

- "Let the Chips Fall" – 2:40
- "She Made Me Go" – 3:07

== Chart performance ==
Chart (1968)	Peak position
Canada Country Songs (RPM)	3
US Hot Country Songs (Billboard)	4
