= All I Have to Offer You (Is Me) =

Single by Charley Pride

from the album The Best of Charley Pride
- B-side: "A Brand New Bed of Roses"
- Released: June 1969 (U.S.)
- Recorded: 1969
- Genre: Country
- Length: 3:00
- Label: RCA Victor
- Songwriters: Dallas Frazier and A.L. "Doodle" Owens
- Producer: Jack Clement

Charley Pride singles chronology
"Kaw-Liga" (1969)	"All I Have to Offer You (Is Me)" (1969)	"(I'm So) Afraid of Losing You Again" (1969)

"All I Have to Offer You (Is Me)" is a song written by Dallas Frazier and A.L. "Doodle" Owens, and recorded by American country music artist Charley Pride. It was released in June 1969 as the first single from his compilation album The Best of Charley Pride. While Charley Pride's version is by far the most famous one, the first version was actually recorded by Johnny Bush in 1968 on his album "Undo the Right."

The song, released that June, reached the top of the Billboard magazine Hot Country Singles chart that August, and in doing so it was Charley Pride's first No. 1 song. It also accomplished a feat not done in 25 years: an African American entertainer having a No. 1 hit on the Billboard country chart. The last song by a black performer to reach the summit was "Is You Is Or Is You Ain't My Baby" by Louis Jordan, in July 1944. Pride became the third black singer to have a No. 1 country hit (the Nat King Cole-led King Cole Trio had a No. 1 hit earlier in 1944).

While Cole would top the charts only once and Jordan twice, "All I Have to Offer You Is Me" would be the first of 29 No. 1 hits for Pride, spanning to 1983's "Night Games."

== Content ==
The narrator speaks to his future wife, and tells her that if she chose to be with him forever, then she won't live a luxurious life every girl dreams about, as he says "All I have to offer you is me".

== Chart performance ==
Chart (1969)	Peak position
US Hot Country Songs (Billboard)	1
US Billboard Hot 100	91
Canadian RPM Country Tracks	3
Canadian RPM Top Singles	82

== Cover versions ==
The song has also been recorded by:

- Conway Twitty on his 1970 album To See My Angel Cry
- The Statler Brothers on their 1970 album Bed of Rose's
- Ray Lynam on his 1975 album 20 Shots of the Country Vol. 1
- McBride & the Ride on their 1992 album Sacred Ground
- The Kaʻau Crater Boys on their 1995 album On Fire
- Tammy Wynette and George Jones on their 1995 album One
- Aaron Tippin on his 1998 album "The Essential Aaron Tippin"
- Ricky Van Shelton on his 2000 album Fried Green Tomatoes.
