= It's Gonna Take a Little Bit Longer =

Single by Charley Pride

from the album A Sunshiny Day with Charley Pride
- B-side: "You're Wanting Me To Stop Loving You"
- Released: May 1972
- Recorded: January 12, 1972
- Genre: Country
- Length: 2:39
- Label: RCA 74-0707
- Songwriter(s): Ben Peters
- Producer(s): Jack Clement

Charley Pride singles chronology
"All His Children" (1972)	"It's Gonna Take a Little Bit Longer" (1972)	"She's Too Good to Be True" (1972)

"It's Gonna Take a Little Bit Longer" is a song written by Ben Peters, and recorded by American country music artist Charley Pride. It was released in May 1972 as the first single from the album A Sunshiny Day with Charley Pride. The song was Pride's ninth number one on the country chart. The single stayed at number one for three weeks and spent a total of fourteen weeks on the country chart.

== Charts ==
Chart (1972)	Peak position
US Hot Country Songs (Billboard)	1
US Bubbling Under Hot 100 Singles (Billboard)	2
Canadian RPM Country Tracks	1
