= Roll On Mississippi (album) =

Studio album by Charley Pride
- Released: March 1981
- Recorded: December 1980
- Studios: Music City Music Hall (Nashville, Tennessee)
- Genre: Country
- Label: RCA Victor
- Producers: Jerry Bradley; Charley Pride

Charley Pride chronology
There's a Little Bit of Hank in Me (1980)	Roll On Mississippi (1981)	Greatest Hits (1981)

Singles from Roll On Mississippi
- 1. "You Almost Slipped My Mind" Released: September 1980; 2. "Roll On Mississippi" Released: February 1981

Roll On Mississippi is the twenty-eighth studio album by American country music artist Charley Pride. It was released in March 1981 by RCA Records and contained ten tracks. It was co-produced by Pride and Jerry Bradley. Roll On Mississippi was Pride's twenty eighth studio album in his career and included two major hits: "You Almost Slipped My Mind" and the title track. The album itself would also reach a peak position on the American country music chart following its release.

== Background and content ==
Charley Pride was able to continue having commercial country music success by adapting his style to a more contemporary country pop. Beginning in the middle 1970s, his music began to reflect this in hits like "She's Just an Old Love Turned Memory," and "Where Do I Put Her Memory." This country pop style continued into the 1980s with albums including Roll On Mississippi. The project was co-produced by Pride himself and his most recent collaborator, Jerry Bradley. The album was recorded at the Music City Music Hall studio, located in Nashville, Tennessee. Most of the recording took place in December 1980. It contained a total of ten tracks. Many of the record's tracks contained string instrumentation and arrangements, such as the songs "He Can Be an Angel" and "Taking the Easy Way Out." In addition, Pride chose songs that had been composed by songwriters he had used for previous albums. This included Ben Peters, John Schweers and Troy Seals.

== Release and reception ==
Professional ratings
Review scores
Source	Rating
AllMusic	3/5 stars

Roll On Mississippi was released in March 1981 on RCA Records. It would mark Pride's twenty-eighth studio collection. It was originally released as both a vinyl LP and a cassette. It would later be issued in the 2010s in a digital format, that was available to music download and streaming services, including Apple Music. The album spent a total of 17 weeks on the Billboard Top Country Albums chart and peaked at number 17 by May 1981. The album would later receive a rating of three stars from AllMusic. Two singles were included on the project. The first was "You Almost Slipped My Mind," which was issued as a single in September 1980. It spent 18 weeks on the Billboard Hot Country Songs chart and reached number four by the end of the year. Its second single was the title track, released in February 1981. Spending 13 weeks on the Billboard country chart, it peaked at number seven by the spring of 1981. Both singles would also reach the top ten of the RPM Country Singles chart in Canada.

== Track listings ==
=== Vinyl and cassette versions ===
Side one
No.	Title	Writer(s)	Length
1.	"Roll On Mississippi"	Kye Fleming; Dennis Morgan	3:33
2.	"I Used to Be That Way"	John Schweers	2:43
3.	"Taking the Easy Way Out"	Kent Robbins; David Wills	2:35
4.	"She's as Good as Gone"	Charles Quillen; Wills	2:30
5.	"He Can Be an Angel"	Donny Lowery	3:41

Side two
No.	Title	Writer(s)	Length
1.	"Fall Back on Me"	Danny Dunn; Richard Root	3:37
2.	"Make It Special Again"	Gary Harrison; Wills	2:41
3.	"You Beat 'Em All"	Ben Peters	2:17
4.	"Ghost-Written Love Letters"	Jerry Hutchins	2:26
5.	"You Almost Slipped My Mind"	Tilden Back; Delbert Barker; Don Goodman; Troy Seals	2:47

=== Digital version ===
Roll On Mississippi
No.	Title	Writer(s)	Length
1.	"Roll On Mississippi"	Fleming; Morgan	3:33
2.	"I Used to Be That Way"	Schweers	2:45
3.	"Taking the Easy Way Out"	Robbins; Wills	2:38
4.	"She's as Good as Gone"	Quillen; Wills	2:30
5.	"He Can Be an Angel"	Lowery	3:42
6.	"Fall Back on Me"	Dunn; Root	3:39
7.	"Make It Special Again"	Harrison; Wills	2:42
8.	"You Beat 'Em All"	Peters	2:19
9.	"Ghost-Written Love Letters"	Hutchins	2:25
10.	"You Almost Slipped My Mind"	Back; Barker; Goodman; Seals	2:51

== Personnel ==
All credits are adapted from the liner notes of Roll On Mississippi.

Musical and technical personnel

- Jerry Bradley – producer
- Herb Burnette – art direction
- Dan Dea – engineer
- Bill Harris – engineer
- The Jordanaires – background vocals
- Randy Kling – mastering
- The Shelly Kurland Strings – strings
- The Nashville Edition – background vocals
- Charley Pride – lead vocals, producer
- Nick Sangiamo – photography
- Pinwheel Studios – art direction
- Bergen White – arrangement

== Chart performance ==
Chart (1981)	Peak position
US Top Country Albums (Billboard)	17

== Release history ==
Region	Date	Format	Label	Ref.
Australia	March 1981	Vinyl	RCA Victor Records	
Canada	March 1981	Vinyl	RCA Victor Records	
United Kingdom	March 1981	Vinyl	RCA Victor Records	
United Kingdom	March 1981	Cassette	RCA Victor Records	
United States	March 1981	Vinyl	RCA Victor Records	
United States	2010s	Digital download; streaming	Sony Music Entertainment	
