= Don't Fight the Feelings of Love =

Single by Charley Pride

from the album Sweet Country
- B-side: "Tennessee Girl"
- Released: April 1973
- Genre: Country
- Length: 2:05
- Label: RCA
- Songwriter(s): John Schweers
- Producer(s): Jack Clement

Charley Pride singles chronology
"A Shoulder to Cry On" (1973)	"Don't Fight the Feelings of Love" (1973)	"Amazing Love" (1973)

"Don't Fight the Feelings of Love" is a song written by John Schweers, and recorded by American country music artist Charley Pride. It was released in April 1973 as the second single from the album Sweet Country. The song was Pride's twelfth number one on the U.S. country singles chart. The single stayed at number one for a single week and spent a total of thirteen weeks on the chart.

== Chart performance ==
Chart (1973)	Peak position
Australia (Kent Music Report)	100
US Hot Country Songs (Billboard)	1
US Bubbling Under Hot 100 Singles (Billboard)	1
Canadian RPM Country Tracks	1
