= Does My Ring Hurt Your Finger =

Single by Charley Pride

from the album The Country Way
- A-side: "Spell of the Freight Train"
- Released: August 1967
- Recorded: June 23, 1967
- Studio: RCA Studio A, Nashville, Tennessee
- Genre: Country; traditional country
- Length: 2:16
- Label: RCA Victor
- Songwriters: Jerry Crutchfield; Don Robertson
- Producers: Chet Atkins; Jack Clement; Felton Jarvis

Charley Pride singles chronology
"I Know One" (1967)	"Does My Ring Hurt Your Finger" (1967)	"The Day the World Stood Still" (1967)

"Does My Ring Hurt Your Finger" is a song written by Jerry Crutchfield and Don Robertson, and recorded by American country music artist Charley Pride. It was released in August 1967 as the first single from the album The Country Way. The song was Pride's fifth single and his third major hit as a recording artist.

== Background and content ==
Under the supervision and guidance of Jack Clement, Charley Pride became country music's first commercially successful African-American recording artist. With his first two singles failing to become successful, Pride finally had his first major hit in 1967 with "Just Between You and Me." He would have several more top ten hits that followed this hit, including "Does My Ring Hurt Your Finger." Unlike his previous singles, "Does My Ring Hurt Your Finger" was composed by Don Robertson and Jerry Crutchfield. The song was recorded on June 23, 1967, at the RCA Victor Studio, with one additional track cut at the same session. Jack Clement co-produced the song with Chet Atkins and Felton Jarvis.

== Release and reception ==
"Does My Ring Hurt Your Finger" was released as a single via RCA Victor Records in August 1967. It was Pride's fifth single released in his music career. His name on the single release was credited as "Country Charlie Pride." RCA incorrectly labeled his name as "Charlie" instead of "Charley." The song was actually the B-side on the single release, with "Spell of the Freight Train" being the A-side. The A-side was not played on the radio however and instead, "Does My Ring Hurt Your Finger" was played. It spent a total of 19 weeks on the Billboard Hot Country Songs chart and peaked at number four on the list in August 1967. The song was Pride's highest-charting hit single up to that point, as his previous hit had reached the number six spot on the country survey. In addition, it also became a hit in Canada, reaching number three on the RPM Country Singles chart in 1967. It was later released on Pride's 1967 studio album on RCA titled The Country Way.

== Track listings ==
7" vinyl single

- "Spell of the Freight Train" – 2:11
- "Does My Ring Hurt Your Finger" – 2:16

== Chart performance ==
Chart (1967)	Peak position
Canada Country Songs (RPM)	3
US Hot Country Songs (Billboard)	4
