= The Easy Part's Over =

Single by Charley Pride

from the album Songs of Pride...Charley That Is
- B-side: "The Right to Do Wrong"
- Released: April 1968
- Recorded: January 2, 1968
- Studio: RCA Studio A, Nashville, Tennessee
- Genre: Country; traditional country
- Length: 2:20
- Label: RCA Victor
- Songwriters: Jerry Foster; Bill Rice
- Producers: Chet Atkins; Jack Clement; Bob Ferguson

Charley Pride singles chronology
"The Day the World Stood Still" (1968)	"The Easy Part's Over" (1968)	"Let the Chips Fall" (1968)

"The Easy Part's Over" is a song written by Jerry Foster and Bill Rice, and recorded by American country music artist Charley Pride. It was released in April 1968 as the first single from the album Songs of Pride...Charley That Is. The song was Pride's seventh single and his fifth major hit as a recording artist.

== Background and content ==
Under the supervision and guidance of Jack Clement, Charley Pride became country music's first commercially successful African-American recording artist. With his first two singles failing to become successful, Pride finally had his first major hit in 1967 with "Just Between You and Me." He would have several more top ten hits that followed this hit, including "The Easy Part's Over." The song was co-written by songwriters Jerry Foster and Bill Rice. The song was recorded on January 2, 1967 at the RCA Victor Studio. Two additional tracks were also recorded at the same session. Jack Clement co-produced the song, along with Chet Atkins and Bob Ferguson.

== Release and reception ==
"The Easy Part's Over" was released as a single via RCA Victor Records in January 1968. It was Pride's seventh single released in his music career. It spent a total of 15 weeks on the Billboard Hot Country Songs chart and peaked at number two on the list in June 1968. The song was Pride's fifth major hit and highest-charting single up to that point. In addition, it also became a hit in Canada, also reaching number two on the RPM Country Singles chart in 1968. It was later released on Pride's 1967 studio album on RCA titled Songs of Pride...Charley That Is.

== Track listings ==
7" vinyl single

- "The Easy Part's Over" – 2:20
- "The Right to Do Wrong" – 2:20

== Chart performance ==
Chart (1968)	Peak position
Canada Country Songs (RPM)	2
US Hot Country Songs (Billboard)	2
