= You Better Keep It on Your Mind =

Single by Hank Williams
- B-side: "Low Down Blues"
- Released: 1954
- Recorded: 1952, Nashville (Unconfirmed)
- Genre: Country, blues
- Length: 2:23
- Label: MGM Records
- Songwriter(s): Hank Williams, Vic McAlpin

"You Better Keep It on Your Mind" is a song by Hank Williams. It was composed by Williams and Vic McAlpin and released as a posthumous single by Williams in 1954 on MGM Records. The B-side was "Low Down Blues." McAlpin was a staff songwriter at Acuff-Rose and had made minor contributions to Hank's "Long Gone Lonesome Blues" while the pair went on a fishing trip. Thematically, "You Better Keep It on Your Mind" is similar to "You're Gonna Change (Or I'm Gonna Leave)," with the narrator warning his significant other to take him seriously. The second voice on the recording is speculated to be Hank Snow.
