= Amazing Love (song) =

Single by Charley Pride

from the album Amazing Love
- B-side: "Blue Ridge Mountains Turning Green"
- Released: September 1973
- Genre: Country
- Length: 3:11
- Label: RCA
- Songwriter(s): John Schweers
- Producer(s): Jack Clement

Charley Pride singles chronology
"Don't Fight the Feelings of Love" (1973)	"Amazing Love" (1973)	"We Could" (1974)

"Amazing Love" is a song written by John Schweers, and recorded by American country music artist Charley Pride. It was released in September 1973 as the first single and title track from the album Amazing Love. The song was Pride's thirteenth number-one single on the U.S. country chart. The single went to number one for a single week and spent thirteen weeks on the chart.

== Cover versions ==
The song also recorded by Conway Twitty on his 1974 album Honky Tonk Angel.

== Chart performance ==
Chart (1973–1974)	Peak position
US Hot Country Songs (Billboard)	1
Canadian RPM Country Tracks	1
