= We Could =

Single by Charley Pride

from the album Country Feelin'
- B-side: "Love Put a Song in My Heart"
- Released: April 1974
- Recorded: 1973
- Genre: Country
- Length: 2:29
- Label: RCA
- Songwriter(s): Felice Bryant
- Producer(s): Jack Clement

Charley Pride singles chronology
"Amazing Love" (1973)	"We Could" (1974)	"Mississippi Cotton Picking Delta Town" (1974)

"We Could" is a song written by Felice Bryant and originally recorded by "Little" Jimmy Dickens in 1955. It's been recorded by numerous acts over the years, including American pop crooner Al Martino, whose version peaked at number 41 on Billboard Hot 100 chart in December 1964, but is best remembered by a version recorded by American country music artist Charley Pride. It was released as the first single from his album Country Feelin'. This version, released nearly ten years after Martino's, peaked at number 3 on the Billboard Hot Country Singles chart. It also reached number 1 on the RPM Country Tracks chart in Canada.

== Chart performance ==
Chart (1974)	Peak position
US Hot Country Songs (Billboard)	3
Canadian RPM Country Tracks	1
