= Never Been So Loved (In All My Life) =

1981 single by Charley Pride

Single by Charley Pride

from the album Greatest Hits
- B-side: "I Call Her My Girl"
- Released: June 1981
- Genre: Country
- Length: 3:04
- Label: RCA
- Songwriter(s): Wayland Holyfield; Norro Wilson
- Producer(s): Norro Wilson

Charley Pride singles chronology
"Roll On Mississippi" (1981)	"Never Been So Loved (In All My Life)" (1981)	"Mountain of Love" (1981)

"Never Been So Loved (In All My Life)" is a song written by Wayland Holyfield and Norro Wilson, and recorded by American country music artist Charley Pride. It was released in June 1981 as the only single from his 1981 compilation album Greatest Hits. The song was Pride's twenty-fifth number one single on the country chart. The single stayed at number one for two weeks and spent a total of eleven weeks on the country chart.

== Charts ==
Chart (1981)	Peak position
US Hot Country Songs (Billboard)	1
Canadian RPM Country Tracks	1
