= The Day the World Stood Still (song) =

- cover art for Japan release

Single by Charley Pride

from the album The Country Way
- B-side: "Gone, on the Other Hand"
- Released: December 1967
- Recorded: July 31, 1967
- Studio: RCA Studio A, Nashville, Tennessee
- Genre: Country; traditional country
- Length: 2:30
- Label: RCA Victor
- Songwriters: Jerry Foster; Bill Rice
- Producers: Chet Atkins; Jack Clement; Felton Jarvis

Charley Pride singles chronology
"Does My Ring Hurt Your Finger" (1967)	"The Day the World Stood Still" (1967)	"The Easy Part's Over" (1968)

"The Day the World Stood Still" is a song written by Jerry Foster and Bill Rice, and recorded by American country music artist Charley Pride. It was released in December 1967 as the second single from the album The Country Way. The song was Pride's sixth single and his fourth major hit as a recording artist.

== Background and content ==
Under the supervision and guidance of Jack Clement, Charley Pride became country music's first commercially-successful African-American recording artist. With his first two singles failing to become successful, Pride finally had his first major hit in 1967 with "Just Between You and Me." He would have several more top ten hits that followed this hit, including "The Day the World Stood Still." The song was co-written by songwriters Jerry Foster and Bill Rice. The song was recorded on July 31, 1967 at the RCA Victor Studio. Two additional tracks were also recorded at the same session, including "Crystal Chandeliers." Jack Clement co-produced the song with Chet Atkins and Felton Jarvis.

== Release and reception ==
"The Day the World Stood Still" was released as a single via RCA Victor Records in December 1967. It was Pride's sixth single released in his music career. It spent a total of 17 weeks on the Billboard Hot Country Songs chart and peaked at number four on the list in March 1968. The song was Pride's fourth major hit and fourth top ten hit in a row. In addition, it also became a hit in Canada, reaching number five on the RPM Country Singles chart in 1967. It was later released on Pride's 1967 studio album on RCA titled The Country Way.

== Track listings ==
7" vinyl single

- "The Day the World Stood Still" – 2:30
- "Gone, on the Other Hand" – 2:29

== Chart performance ==
Chart (1967–1968)	Peak position
Canada Country Songs (RPM)	5
US Hot Country Songs (Billboard)	4
