= You're My Jamaica (album) =

Studio album by Charley Pride
- Released: August 1979
- Recorded: May 1979
- Studios: Music City Music Hall, Nashville, Tennessee
- Genres: Country; country pop
- Label: RCA Victor
- Producers: Jerry Bradley; Charley Pride

Charley Pride chronology
Burgers and Fries/When I Stop Leaving (I'll Be Gone) (1978)	You're My Jamaica (1979)	There's a Little Bit of Hank in Me (1980)

Singles from You're My Jamaica
- 1. "You're My Jamaica" Released: July 1979; 2. "Missin' You" Released: October 1979

You're My Jamaica is a studio album by American country music artist Charley Pride. It was released in August 1979 via RCA Victor Records and contained ten tracks. It was co-produced by Pride and Jerry Bradley. You're My Jamaica was the twenty sixth studio project released in his music career. Both its singles became major hits on the country charts in the United States and Canada: "Missin' You" and the title track. The record would receive positive reviews from music publications following its release.

== Background and content ==
As Charley Pride's career progressed, he developed a smoother country pop style. This became more evident in the latter half of the 1970s decade with several hits that promoted this image, such as "She's Just an Old Love Turned Memory" and "Where Do I Put Her Memory." You're My Jamaica also exemplified a country pop sound. The album was recorded at the Music City Hall studio, which was located in Nashville, Tennessee. Sessions took place in May 1979 under the co-production of Pride and his recent collaborator, Jerry Bradley. All of the album's ten titles were new tracks. Two of its tracks were cuts composed by Gary McCray: "Heartbreak Mountain" and "Let Me Have a Chance to Love You." It also featured two songs composed by Kent Robbins, including the single "Missin' You."

== Release and reception ==
Professional ratings
Review scores
Source	Rating
AllMusic	3/5 stars

You're My Jamaica was released in August on RCA Victor Records. The project would make it Pride's twenty sixth studio album release in his recording career. The album was originally distributed as both a vinyl LP and a cassette. The album would peak at number 11 on the Billboard Top Country Albums chart in the fall of 1979. It also reached number six on the Canadian RPM Country Albums chart, becoming his third LP to reach a position on the list. It also was Pride's first studio release to chart in New Zealand, reaching number 33 on their albums chart in 1979. Following its release, You're My Jamaica would receive a positive response from Billboard magazine. Writers called Pride's vocal performance to be "better than ever" and found the album's material to be top of top quality. The San Bernardino Sun noted that Pride "is laid back on this album... His voice is particularly well suited for the echo effect used on many of the cuts."

Two singles would be spawned from You're My Jamaica. The title track was the project's first single release, which occurred in May 1979. It spent 15 weeks on the Billboard Hot Country Songs list and eventually reached the number one spot by September 1979. "Missin' You" was issued in October 1979 as the album's second single. The song also spent 15 weeks on the Billboard country chart and peaked at number two by January 1980. Both singles would reach identical chart positions on the RPM Country Singles chart in Canada.

== Track listing ==
=== Vinyl and cassette versions ===
Side one
No.	Title	Writer(s)	Length
1.	"What're We Doing This Again"	Bob McDill	2:28
2.	"No Relief in Sight"	Rory Bourke; Gene Dobbins; Johnny Wilson	2:55
3.	"Playin' Around"	Ben Peters	2:24
4.	"Missin' You"	Kye Fleming; Dennis Morgan	2:25
5.	"You're My Jamaica"	Kent Robbins	3:30

Side two
No.	Title	Writer(s)	Length
1.	"Heartbreak Mountain"	Gary McCray	2:23
2.	"To Have and to Hold"	Peters	2:05
3.	"Let Me Have a Chance to Love You (One More Time)"	McCray	2:50
4.	"I Want You"	Robbins	2:06
5.	"When the Goodtimes Outweighed the Bad"	Campbell; McCray	2:42

== Personnel ==
All credits are adapted from the liner notes of You're My Jamaica.

Musical personnel

- Harold Bradley – bass guitar
- David Briggs – piano
- Jimmy Capps – guitar
- Ray Edenton – guitar
- Ralph Gallant – drums
- The Jordanaires – background vocals
- Mike Leach – bass
- Charlie McCoy – harmonica, vibes
- Charley Pride – lead vocals
- Pete Wade – guitar
- Chip Young – guitar

Technical personnel

- Jerry Bradley – producer
- Herb Burnette – art direction
- Dan Dea – engineer
- Richard Dodd – engineer
- Bill Harris – engineer
- Randy Kling – mastering
- Mike Moran – arrangement
- Charley Pride – producer
- Nick Sangiamo – photography
- Bergen White – arrangement

== Charts ==
=== Weekly charts ===
Chart (1979)	Peak position
Canada Country Albums/CD's (RPM)	6
New Zealand (Recorded Music NZ)	33
US Top Country Albums (Billboard)	7

=== Year-end charts ===
Chart (1980)	Position
US Top Country Albums (Billboard)	47

== Release history ==
Region	Date	Format	Label	Ref.
Australia	August 1979	Vinyl	RCA Victor Records	
Canada	August 1979	Vinyl	RCA Victor Records	
New Zealand	August 1979	Vinyl	RCA Victor Records	
United Kingdom	August 1979	Vinyl	RCA Victor Records	
United States	August 1979	Vinyl	RCA Victor Records	
United States	August 1979	Cassette	RCA Victor Records	
