= Country Feelin' =

Studio album by Charley Pride
- Released: May 1974
- Studio: RCA Studio B (Nashville, Tennessee)
- Genre: Country
- Label: RCA Victor
- Producer: Jack Clement

Charley Pride chronology
Amazing Love (1973)	Country Feelin' (1974)	Pride of America (1974)

Singles from Country Feelin'
- 1. "We Could" Released: April 1974

Country Feelin' is the eighteenth studio album by American country music singer Charley Pride released in May 1974 by RCA Records. It reached No. 15 on the Billboard Country chart. One single from the album, "We Could", reached No. 3 in the US country chart and No. 1 in the Canadian country chart.

== Track listing ==
No.	Title	Writer(s)	Length
1.	"Which Way Do We Go"	Allen Reynolds, Don Williams	2:47
2.	"We Could"	Felice Bryant	2:29
3.	"It Amazes Me"	Allen Reynolds, Wayland Holyfield	2:05
4.	"All His Children"	Alan Bergman, Marilyn Bergman	2:56
5.	"Streets of Gold"	Jim Lunsford	1:55
6.	"I Don't See How I Can Love You Anymore"	Max D. Barnes, Maria Houston	2:47
7.	"Singin' a Song About Love"	Ben Peters	2:11
8.	"The Man I Used to Be"	Barnes	1:56
9.	"Let My Love In"	John Riggs	2:53
10.	"Love Put a Song in My Heart"	Peters	3:07

== Production ==
- Producer - Jack Clement
- Recording Engineers - Bill Vandevort, Tom Pick and Al Pachuki
- Recording Technicians - Ray Butts, Mike Shockley and Roy Shockley
- Recorded in RCA's "Nashville Sound" Studios, Nashville, Tennessee.
- Album Photography - John Donegan
- Album Art director - Acy Lehman
- Vocal Accompaniment by The Nashville Edition
- "All His Children" arranged and conducted by Henry Mancini (from the motion picture Sometimes a Great Notion)

== Charts ==
Chart performance for Country Feelin'
Chart (1966)	Peak position
US Top Country Albums (Billboard)	15
