= The Incomparable Charley Pride =

Compilation album by Charley Pride
- Released: 1972
- Recorded: January 1970 – January 1972
- Genre: Country
- Label: RCA Camden
- Producer: Jack Clement

Charley Pride chronology
| A Sunshiny Day with Charley Pride (1972) | The Incomparable Charley Pride (1972) | Songs of Love by Charley Pride (1972) |

The Incomparable Charley Pride is a compilation album by country singer Charley Pride, released on the budget RCA Camden label in August 1972. The album reached number 16 on the Billboard Top Country Albums chart and number 189 on the Billboard 200.

Unlike other albums on RCA Camden which usually reissued an artist's older material, the emphasis on this album is on tracks from the then recently released Pride RCA Victor albums "Charley Pride Sings Heart Songs" (1971), "From Me To You" (1970), "I'm Just Me" (1971), "Did You Think To Pray" (1971), and "A Sunshiny Day With Charley Pride" (1972).

== Track listing ==
Side One

1. "I'd Rather Love You" (Johnny Duncan)
2. "Time (You're Not a Friend of Mine)" (Sue Lane)
3. "Jeanie Norman" (Dale Morris)
4. "Anywhere (Just Inside Your Arms)" (Wanda Ballman)
5. "When the Trains Come In" (Al Urban)

Side Two

1. "Piroque Joe" (Roy Botkin)
2. "Was It All Worth Losing You" (Audie Murphy)
3. "Instant Loneliness" (Johnny Duncan)
4. "This Highway Leads to Glory" (Lassaye Holmes)
5. "Time Out for Jesus" (Ann J. Morton)

== Charts ==
Chart performance for The Incomparable Charley Pride
| Chart (1972) | Peak position |
|---|---|
| US Top Country Albums (Billboard) | 16 |
