= Country Charley Pride =

Studio album by Charley Pride
- Released: September 1966
- Studio: RCA Victor, Nashville, Tennessee
- Genre: Country
- Label: RCA Victor
- Producer: Bob Ferguson, Chet Atkins, Jack Clement

Charley Pride chronology
Country Charley Pride (1966)	Pride of Country Music (1967)

Country Charley Pride is the debut studio album by country music artist Charley Pride. It was released in September 1966 on the RCA Victor label (catalog no. LSP-3645). The album was awarded three stars from the web site AllMusic. The album debuted on Billboard's country album chart on November 5, 1966, peaked at No. 16, and remained on the chart for 23 weeks.

== Track listing ==
Side A

1. "Busted" [2:07]
2. "Distant Drums" [2:44]
3. "Detroit City" [3:01]
4. "Yonder Comes a Sucker" [2:22]
5. "Green, Green Grass of Home" [2:55]
6. "That's the Chance I'll Have to Take" [2:03]

Side B

1. "Before I Met You" [2:26]
2. "Folsom Prison Blues" [2:35]
3. "The Snakes Crawl at Night" [2:46]
4. "Miller's Cave" [3:15]
5. "The Atlantic Coastal Line" [2:12]
6. "Got Leavin' on Her Mind" [2:14]

== Charts ==
Chart performance for Country Charley Pride
Chart (1966)	Peak position
US Top Country Albums (Billboard)	16

== See also ==
- Charley Pride discography
