= Burgers and Fries/When I Stop Leaving (I'll Be Gone) =

Studio album by Charley Pride
- Released: October 1978
- Recorded: 1977
- Studios: Music City Music Hall, Nashville, Tennessee
- Genres: Country; country pop
- Label: RCA Victor
- Producers: Jerry Bradley; Charley Pride

Charley Pride chronology
| Someone Loves You Honey (1978) | Burgers and Fries/When I Stop Leaving (I'll Be Gone) (1978) | You're My Jamaica (1979) |

Singles from Burgers and Fries/When I Stop Leaving (I'll Be Gone)
- 1. "When I Stop Leaving (I'll Be Gone)" Released: May 1978; 2. "Burgers and Fries" Released: October 1978; 3. "Where Do I Put Her Memory" Released: February 1979

Burgers and Fries/When I Stop Leaving (I'll Be Gone) is the twenty-fifth studio album by American country music artist Charley Pride. It was released in October 1978 on RCA Victor and contained ten tracks. It was co-produced by Pride and Jerry Bradley. The project was Pride's twenty fifth studio release in his recording career and reached major chart positions in the United States and Canada. Three singles were released off the album, including both of its title tracks and "Where Do I Put Her Memory." All three singles became major hits on the country charts in the United States and Canada.

== Background and content ==
Charley Pride became initially successful from his traditional country style, which was found throughout his early work in the late 1960s and the early 1970s. As musical tastes changed in country music, Pride's style shifted toward country pop. According to writers such as Stephen Thomas Erlewine, certain physical characteristics contributed to this successful musical shift, notably Pride's baritone voice range. This country pop influence was found on later 1970s albums, including Burgers and Fries/When I Stop Leaving (I'll Be Gone).

The record was recorded in 1977 at the Music City Hall studio, located in Nashville, Tennessee. It was Pride's first recording session for an album at the latter studio. The sessions were co-produced by Pride and his recent collaborator, Jerry Bradley. The album consisted of ten tracks. All of the songs were newly recorded material for Pride. Both of the project's title tracks were new recordings, as well as two more cuts composed by Ben Peters. The track "I Can See Lovin' in Your Eyes" was co-written by Pride, along with two additional collaborators.

== Release and reception ==
Professional ratings
Review scores
| Source | Rating |
|---|---|
| AllMusic | 4/5 stars |

Burgers and Fries/When I Stop Leaving (I'll Be Gone) was initially released in October 1978 on the RCA Victor label. It would mark Pride's twenty fifth studio album release in his career. The record was initially released as both a vinyl LP and a cassette. In later decades, it was re-released in a digital format for downloads and streaming purposes. It spent a total of 32 weeks on the Billboard Top Country Albums chart. In December 1978, the record peaked at number seven on the chart. It reached a similar position on the Canadian RPM Country Albums chart, reaching number four. It retrospectively received a four-star rating from AllMusic, which named its title track ("Burgers and Fries") an "album pick."

Three singles were released from the album. Its first was one of its title tracks, "When I Stop Leavin' (I'll Be Gone)," which was issued as a single in May 1978. The song would peak at number three on the Billboard Hot Country Songs chart by August. Its second single release was also a title track, "Burgers and Fries." It was officially released in October 1978. It spent 14 weeks on the Billboard country chart and reached number two by December. Its third (and final) single release was "Where Do I Put Her Memory," in February 1979. By April 1979, the single had reached number one on the Billboard country songs list. All three singles would also reach number one on the RPM Country Singles chart in Canada.

== Track listings ==
=== Vinyl version ===
Side one
| No. | Title | Writer(s) | Length |
|---|---|---|---|
| 1. | "Burgers and Fries" | Ben Peters | 3:10 |
| 2. | "The Best in the World" | Peters | 2:20 |
| 3. | "Whose Arms Are You in Tonight" | Rory Bourke; Gene Dobbins; Johnny Wilson | 2:09 |
| 4. | "Nothing Prettier Than Rose Is" | Gary McCray | 2:27 |
| 5. | "Mem'ries" | Linda Hargrove; Susan Hargrove | 1:56 |

Side two
| No. | Title | Writer(s) | Length |
|---|---|---|---|
| 1. | "When I Stop Leaving (I'll Be Gone)" | Kent Robbins | 2:33 |
| 2. | "I Can See the Lovin' in Your Eyes" | Mickey Johnson; June LaSalvia; Charley Pride | 2:10 |
| 3. | "One on One" | Peters | 2:28 |
| 4. | "Where Do I Put Her Memory" | Jim Weatherly | 4:04 |
| 5. | "You Snap Your Fingers (And I'm Back in Your Hands)" | John Schweers | 3:05 |

=== Cassette version ===
Side one
| No. | Title | Writer(s) | Length |
|---|---|---|---|
| 1. | "Burgers and Fries" | Peters | 3:10 |
| 2. | "You Snap Your Fingers (And I'm Back in Your Hands)" | Schweers | 3:05 |
| 3. | "Whose Arms Are You in Tonight" | Bourke; Dobbins; Wilson | 2:09 |
| 4. | "Nothing Prettier Than Rose Is" | McCray | 2:27 |
| 5. | "Mem'ries" | Hargrove; Hargrove | 1:56 |

Side two
| No. | Title | Writer(s) | Length |
|---|---|---|---|
| 1. | "When I Stop Leaving (I'll Be Gone)" | Robbins | 2:33 |
| 2. | "I Can See the Lovin' in Your Eyes" | Johnson; LaSalvia; Pride | 2:10 |
| 3. | "One on One" | Peters | 2:28 |
| 4. | "Where Do I Put Her Memory" | Weatherly | 4:04 |
| 5. | "The Best in the World" | Peters | 2:20 |

=== Digital version ===
Burgers and Fries/When I Stop Leaving (I'll Be Gone)
| No. | Title | Writer(s) | Length |
|---|---|---|---|
| 1. | "Burgers and Fries" | Peters | 3:10 |
| 2. | "The Best in the World" | Peters | 2:19 |
| 3. | "Whose Arms Are You in Tonight" | Bourke; Dobbins; Wilson | 2:09 |
| 4. | "Nothing Prettier Than Rose Is" | McCray | 2:27 |
| 5. | "Mem'ries" | Linda Hargrove; Hargrove | 2:38 |
| 6. | "When I Stop Leavin' (I'll Be Gone)" | Robbins | 2:33 |
| 7. | "I Can See the Lovin' in Your Eyes" | Johnson; LaSalvia; Pride | 2:09 |
| 8. | "One on One" | Peters | 2:28 |
| 9. | "Where Do I Put Her Memory" | Weatherly | 4:02 |
| 10. | "You Snap Your Fingers (And I'm Back in Your Hands)" | Schweers | 3:01 |

== Personnel ==
All credits are adapted from the liner notes of Burgers and Fries/When I Stop Leaving (I'll Be Gone).

Musical personnel

- Hayward Bishop – drums
- Harold Bradley – bass guitar
- David Briggs – piano
- Sonny Garrish – steel guitar
- Johnny Gimble – fiddle
- The Jordanaires – background vocals
- Mike Leach – bass
- Charlie McCoy – harmonica, vibes
- Charley Pride – lead vocals
- Dale Sellers – guitar
- Pete Wade – guitar
- Tommy Williams – fiddle
- Chip Young – guitar

Technical personnel

- Jerry Bradley – producer
- Herb Burnette – art direction
- Sam Causey – photography
- Dan Dea – engineer
- Bill Harris – engineer
- Randy Kling – mastering
- Charley Pride – producer
- Bergen White – arrangement

== Chart performance ==
| Chart (1978) | Peak position |
|---|---|
| Canada Country Albums/CD's (RPM) | 4 |
| US Top Country Albums (Billboard) | 7 |

== Release history ==
| Region | Date | Format | Label |
|---|---|---|---|
| Australia | October 1978 | Vinyl | RCA Victor Records |
| United Kingdom | October 1978 | Vinyl | RCA Victor Records |
| United States | October 1978 | Vinyl | RCA Victor Records |
| United States | October 1978 | Cassette | RCA Victor Records |
| United States | 2010s | Sony Music Entertainment | Digital; streaming |
