= Is Anybody Goin' to San Antone =

1970 song recorded by Charley Pride

"Is Anybody Goin' to San Antone?"

Single by Charley Pride

from the album Charley Pride's 10th Album
- B-side: "Things Are Looking Up" (U.S.) "Wings of a Dove" (Intl.)
- Released: February 1970
- Studio: RCA Studio B, Nashville
- Genre: Countrypolitan
- Length: 2:13
- Label: RCA Victor
- Songwriters: Glenn Martin; Dave Kirby
- Producer: Jack Clement

Charley Pride singles chronology
"(I'm So) Afraid of Losing You Again" (1969)	"Is Anybody Goin' to San Antone?" (1970)	"Wonder Could I Live There Anymore" (1970)

"(Is Anybody Going to) San Antone"

Single by Doug Sahm and Band

from the album Doug Sahm and Band
- B-side: "Don't Turn Around"
- Released: February 1973
- Genre: country rock
- Length: 3:10
- Label: Atlantic Records
- Songwriters: Glenn Martin; Dave Kirby
- Producers: Jerry Wexler, Arif Mardin, and Doug Sahm

"Is Anybody Goin' to San Antone" is a country music song written by Glenn Martin and Dave Kirby. The song was first recorded by former football player Bake Turner, but was made a major country hit by Charley Pride. It was released in February 1970 as the first single from the album Charley Pride's 10th Album. The song was Pride's third number one in a row on the country charts. The single spent two weeks at number one and a total of 16 weeks on the country chart.

== Content ==
The narrator has left a toxic relationship with his wife/girlfriend and is hitchhiking along Route 66 on a cold and stormy day. He is hoping for a ride to San Antonio or Phoenix, but will be satisfied with any destination "as long as I can forget I've ever known her."

== Background ==
Pride's manager, Jack D. Johnson, was given a demonstration tape of this song and rewrote it, changing the chords, lyrics, and arrangement to better fit his client, Charley Pride. Pride recorded and made this rewrite his third number-one hit. Jack did not take songwriter's credit, as he was working for the success of his client. Jack wrote other songs, including "Too Hard To Say I'm Sorry", also sung by Charley Pride, cowritten with Jack Clement.

== Chart performance ==
Chart (1970)	Peak position
Australia (Kent Music Report)	56
Canadian RPM Country Tracks	1
US Hot Country Songs (Billboard)	1
US Billboard Hot 100	70

== Cover Versions ==
- Nancy Sinatra recorded a version of the song which was featured on the B-side of her 1971 single, "Hook And Ladder". The song was included on her 2009 digital only collection, Cherry Smiles – The Rare Singles.
- The song was also a popular part of the repertoire of legendary Texas musician and San Antonio native, Doug Sahm, who recorded it in 1973 for his album Doug Sahm and Band, then again in 1991 with his group, the Texas Tornados.
- Bengt Palmers wrote lyrics in Swedish, Kan ingen tala om för mig när tåget går? ("Can anybody tell me when the train departs"), allowing Siv-Inger Svensson to score a Svensktoppen hit for six weeks during 10 February – 17 March 1974 period, peaking at fourth place.
- In 2008, Swedish dansband Drifters covered the song with these lyrics on the cover album Tycker om dig: Svängiga låtar från förr.

== Popular culture ==
- In his live 1994 album from The Birchmere in Virginia titled Night After Night, Jerry Jeff Walker tips his hat to Charley Pride with a riff on "Sangria Wine" with the lines- "Is Anybody Goin to San Antone or Phoenix, Arizona? Anyplace is all right as long as I don't have to go to Waco."
