= Low Down Blues =

Single by Hank Williams
- A-side: "You Better Keep It on Your Mind"
- Released: 1954
- Recorded: 1951 (unconfirmed)
- Genre: Country, Blues
- Length: 1:17
- Label: MGM Records
- Songwriter: Hank Williams

"Low Down Blues" is a song written by Hank Williams and issued by MGM Records in 1954.

== Background ==
"Low Down Blues" was released as 78 single more than a year after Williams' death. A demo recording featuring only the singer and his guitar, the track shows Hank's affinity for the blues and was likely recorded in 1951. Like his #1 hit "Long Gone Lonesome Blues," the song references suicide by drowning ("I went to the river but the water's too cold") and also references the Ernest Tubb hit "Walkin' the Floor Over You" ("I walked the floor 'til I wore out my shoes"), which he would allude to again on "Your Cheatin' Heart." The song could be interpreted as being a metaphor for Williams' chronic back pain (it is commonly accepted that he had long suffered from an undiagnosed case of spina bifida); the song begins with the lines, "Lord I went to the doctor, he took one look/He said the trouble with you ain't in my book..."

Billy Fury recorded two versions for Decca Records. Charlie Pride also covered the song for RCA.
