= Songs of Pride...Charley That Is =

Studio album by Charley Pride
- Released: September 1968
- Studio: RCA Studio A, Nashville, Tennessee
- Genre: Country
- Label: RCA Victor
- Producer: Chet Atkins, Jack Clement, Felton Jarvis

Charley Pride chronology
| Make Mine Country (1968) | Songs of Pride...Charley That Is (1968) | Charley Pride in Person (1969) |

Singles from Songs of Pride...Charley That Is
- 1. "The Easy Part's Over" Released: April 1968

Songs of Pride...Charley That Is is the fifth studio album by American country music artist Charley Pride released in 1968 on RCA Victor (1971 in the UK from which the following track listing was obtained). It reached number 6 on the Billboard Top Country Albums chart.

== Track listing ==
| No. | Title | Writer(s) | Length |
|---|---|---|---|
| 1. | "Someday You Will" | Jerry Foster, Bill Rice | 2:22 |
| 2. | "She Made Me Go" | J. Foster, Rice | 3:07 |
| 3. | "The Right to Do Wrong" | Fred Foster | 2:20 |
| 4. | "The Easy Part's Over" | J. Foster, Rice | 2:20 |
| 5. | "The Day You Stop Loving Me" | Ray Buzzeo | 2:45 |
| 6. | "I Could Have Saved You the Time" | Jack Clement | 2:32 |
| 7. | "One of These Days" | Vincent Matthews | 2:25 |
| 8. | "All the Time" | Wayne Walker, Mel Tillis | 2:47 |
| 9. | "My Heart Is a House" | Re Winkler, Johnny Hathcock | 2:18 |
| 10. | "Let Me Help You Work It Out" | F. Foster | 2:27 |
| 11. | "Both of Us Love You" | Red Lane | 1:48 |
| 12. | "The Top of the World" | Johnny Irwin | 2:34 |

== Production ==
- Produced by Chet Atkins, Jack Clement, and Felton Jarvis
- Recorded in RCA's "Nashville Sound" Studio, Nashville, Tennessee
- Recording Engineers: Jim Malloy, Tom Pick and Al Pachucki

== Charts ==
Chart performance for Songs of Pride...Charley That Is
| Chart (1968) | Peak position |
|---|---|
| US Top Country Albums (Billboard) | 6 |
