= The Country Way =

Studio album by Charley Pride
- Released: December 1967
- Studio: RCA Studio A, Nashville, Tennessee
- Genre: Country
- Label: RCA Victor
- Producer: Chet Atkins, Jack Clement, Felton Jarvis

Charley Pride chronology
Pride of Country Music (1967)	The Country Way (1967)	Make Mine Country (1968)

Singles from The Country Way
- 1. "Does My Ring Hurt Your Finger" Released: August 1967; 2. "The Day the World Stood Still" Released: December 1967

The Country Way is the third studio album by American country music artist Charley Pride. It was released in 1967 on the RCA Victor label (catalog no. LSP-3895). The album was awarded four-and-a-half stars from the web site AllMusic. It debuted on Billboard's country album chart on December 23, 1967, peaked at No. 1, and remained on the chart for 42 weeks.

== Track listing ==
No.	Title	Writer(s)	Length
1.	"Too Hard to Say I'm Sorry"	Jack Clement, Jack D. Johnson	2:32
2.	"The Little Folks"	Clement	2:47
3.	"Crystal Chandelier"	Ted Harris	2:47
4.	"Act Naturally"	Johnny Russell, Voni Morrison	2:31
5.	"Does My Ring Hurt Your Finger"	Jerry Crutchfield, Don Robertson	2:16
6.	"Mama Don't Cry for Me"	Norro Wilson, Fred Foster	2:51
7.	"The Day the World Stood Still"	Bill Rice, Jerry Foster	2:30
8.	"Gone, on the Other Hand"	Clement	2:29
9.	"You Can Tell the World"	"Country" Johnny Mathis	2:34
10.	"I'll Wander Back to You"	Danny Dill, Fred Burch, Mel Tillis	3:01
11.	"Life Turned Her That Way"	Harlan Howard	2:16
12.	"I Threw Away the Rose"	Merle Haggard	3:00

== Charts ==
Chart performance for The Country Way
Chart (1967)	Peak position
US Billboard 200	199
US Top Country Albums (Billboard)	1
