= Make Mine Country =

Studio album by Charley Pride
- Released: May 1968
- Recorded: October 1967
- Studios: RCA Studio A, Nashville, Tennessee
- Genre: Country
- Label: RCA Victor
- Producers: Chet Atkins, Jack Clement, Bob Ferguson, Felton Jarvis

Charley Pride chronology
The Country Way (1967)	Make Mine Country (1968)	Songs of Pride...Charley That Is (1968)

Professional ratings
Review scores
Source	Rating
AllMusic	4/5 stars
The Encyclopedia of Popular Music	3/5 stars
The New Rolling Stone Record Guide	3/5 stars

Make Mine Country is the fourth studio album by American country music singer Charley Pride, released in 1968 on RCA Victor.

The album peaked at No. 4 on the Billboard Top Country Albums chart.

== Track listing ==
No.	Title	Writer(s)	Length
1.	"Now I Can Live Again"	Jack Clement	2:16
2.	"A Word or Two to Mary"	Vince Bulla, Peter Cotton	3:37
3.	"If You Should Come Back Today"	"Country" Johnny Mathis, Harlan Howard	1:53
4.	"Guess Things Happen That Way"	Clement	1:53
5.	"Before the Next Teardrop Falls"	Ben Peters, Vivian Keith	2:13
6.	"Banks of the Ohio"	Clement	2:45
7.	"Wings of a Dove"	Bob Ferguson	2:24
8.	"A Girl I Used to Know"	Clement	2:30
9.	"Lie to Me"	Harold Dorman, Wylie Gann	1:58
10.	"Why Didn't I Think of That"	Clay Allen, Jack Greene, Jim Glaser	2:!5
11.	"Above and Beyond (The Call of Love)"	Harlan Howard	2:06
12.	"Baby Is Gone"	Clement	2:20

== Personnel ==
- Charley Pride – vocals
- Harold Bradley, Wayne Moss, William Irvin – guitar
- Lloyd Green, Weldon Myrick – steel guitar
- Roy M. "Junior" Huskey – bass
- Hargus "Pig" Robbins – piano
- Jerry Carrigan – drums
- Recording engineer – Jim Malloy
- Producers – Chet Atkins, Jack Clement, Bob Ferguson and Felton Jarvis

== Charts ==
Chart (1968)	Peak position
US Top Country Albums	4
