= I Know One =

Single by Charley Pride

from the album Pride of Country Music
- B-side: "Best Banjo Picker"
- Released: March 1967
- Recorded: January 9, 1967
- Studio: RCA Studio A, Nashville, Tennessee
- Genre: Country; traditional country
- Length: 2:23
- Label: RCA Victor
- Songwriter(s): Jack Clement
- Producer(s): Chet Atkins; Jack Clement; Felton Jarvis

Charley Pride singles chronology
"Just Between You and Me" (1967)	"I Know One" (1967)	"Does My Ring Hurt Your Finger" (1967)

"I Know One" is a song written by Jack Clement, and recorded by American country music artist Charley Pride. It was released in March 1967 as the second single from the album Pride of Country Music. The song was Pride's fourth single and his second major hit as a recording artist.

== Background and content ==
"I Know One" was recorded by Jim Reeves and released in 1960 on RCA Victor.

In 1966, Charley Pride secured his first recording contract with RCA Victor Records. Under the supervision of Jack Clement, Pride would record many of his hit singles. With his first two singles, RCA did not include a promotional photograph of Pride's face in anticipation that radio DJ's would fail to play him because of his skin color. Both his two singles ("The Snakes Crawl at Night" and "Before I Met You") failed to become hits. Pride had just previously had first major hit with "Just Between You and Me." This would start a string of hits that would continue for almost two decades, including "I Know One." Like his previous single, "I Know One" was composed by Jack Clement. The song was recorded in January 1967 at the RCA Victor Studio, with two additional tracks cut at the same session. Clement co-produced the song with Chet Atkins and Felton Jarvis.

== Release and reception ==
"I Know One" was released as a single via RCA Victor Records in March 1967. It was Pride's fourth single released in his music career. His name on the single release was credited as "Country Charley Pride." It spent a total of 19 weeks on the Billboard Hot Country Songs chart and peaked at number six on the list in August 1967. The song was Pride's highest-charting hit single up to that point, as his previous hit had reached the number nine spot on the country survey. It was later released on Pride's 1967 studio album on RCA titled Pride of Country Music.

== Track listings ==
7" vinyl single

- "I Know One" – 2:23
- "Best Banjo Picker" – 2:08

== Chart performance ==
Chart (1967)	Peak position
US Hot Country Songs (Billboard)	6
