= Missin' You (Charley Pride song) =

Single by Charley Pride

from the album You're My Jamaica
- B-side: "Heartbreak Mountain"
- Released: October 1979
- Genre: Country
- Length: 2:30
- Label: RCA Victor
- Songwriters: Kye Fleming; Dennis Morgan
- Producers: Jerry Bradley; Charley Pride

Charley Pride singles chronology
"You're My Jamaica" (1979)	"Missin' You" (1979)	"Honky Tonk Blues" (1980)

"Missin' You" is a song written by Kye Fleming and Dennis Morgan, and recorded by American country music artist Charley Pride. It was released in October 1979 as the second single from his album You're My Jamaica. The song peaked at number 2 on the Billboard Hot Country Singles chart.

== Cover versions ==
The song was later recorded by Sylvia on her 1981 album Drifter.

== Charts ==
=== Weekly charts ===
Chart (1979–1980)	Peak position
US Hot Country Songs (Billboard)	2
Canadian RPM Country Tracks	2

=== Year-end charts ===
Chart (1980)	Position
US Hot Country Songs (Billboard)	50
