= Pride of Country Music =

Studio album by Charley Pride
- Released: June 1967
- Studio: RCA Studio A, Nashville, Tennessee
- Genre: Country
- Label: RCA Victor
- Producer: Bob Ferguson, Chet Atkins, Felton Jarvis, Jack Clement

Charley Pride chronology
Country Charley Pride (1966)	Pride of Country Music (1967)	The Country Way (1967)

Singles from The Country Way
- 1. "Just Between You and Me" Released: September 1966; 2. "I Know One" Released: March 1967

Pride of Country Music is the second studio album by American country music artist Charley Pride. It was released in 1967 on the RCA Victor label (catalog no. LSP-3775). The album was awarded four-and-a-half stars from the web site AllMusic. It debuted on Billboard's country album chart on July 1, 1967, peaked at No. 33, and remained on the chart for 10 weeks.

== Track listing ==
Side A
No.	Title	Writer(s)	Length
1.	"In the Middle of Nowhere"	Liz Anderson	2:57
2.	"The Last Thing on My Mind"	Tom Paxton	2:07
3.	"Just Between You and Me"	Jack Clement	2:13
4.	"Apartment #9"	Bobby Austin, Johnny Paycheck	2:50
5.	"Spell of the Freight Train"	Clement	2:11
6.	"I Know One"	Clement	2:23

Side B
No.	Title	Writer(s)	Length
7.	"I'm Not the Boy I Used to Be"	Curly Putman	3:16
8.	"A Good Woman's Love"	Cy Coben	2:10
9.	"Silence"	Leon Ashley, Margie Singleton	2:30
10.	"Take Me Home"	Allen Reynolds, Clement	2:26
11.	"Touch My Heart"	Aubrey Mayhew, Paycheck	2:49
12.	"Best Banjo Picker"	Clement	2:08

== Charts ==
Chart performance for Pride of Country Music
Chart (1967)	Peak position
US Top Country Albums (Billboard)	33

== See also ==
- Charley Pride discography
