= She's Too Good to Be True (Charley Pride song) =

Single by Charley Pride

from the album Songs of Love by Charley Pride
- B-side: "She's That Kind"
- Released: September 1972
- Genre: Country
- Length: 2:51
- Label: RCA
- Songwriter(s): Johnny Duncan
- Producer(s): Jack Clement

Charley Pride singles chronology
| "It's Gonna Take a Little Bit Longer" (1972) | "She's Too Good to Be True" (1972) | "A Shoulder to Cry On" (1973) |

"She's Too Good to Be True" is a song written by Johnny Duncan, and recorded by American country music artist Charley Pride. It was released in September 1972 as the first single from the album Songs of Love by Charley Pride. The song was Pride's tenth number one on the country chart. The single stayed at number one for three weeks and spent a total of fourteen weeks on the country chart.

== Chart performance ==
| Chart (1972) | Peak position |
|---|---|
| US Hot Country Songs (Billboard) | 1 |
| Canadian RPM Country Tracks | 1 |
