= The Best of Charley Pride, Volume II =

Compilation album by Charley Pride
- Released: March 1972
- Genre: Country
- Label: RCA Victor
- Producer: Jack Clement

Charley Pride chronology
Charley Pride Sings Heart Songs (1969)	The Best of Charley Pride, Volume II (1972)	A Sunshiny Day with Charley Pride (1972)

The Best of Charley Pride, Volume II is the second compilation album by American country music artist Charley Pride. It was released on the RCA Victor label (catalog no. LSP-4682). It debuted on Billboard magazine's country album chart on March 25, 1972, spent 16 weeks at the No. 1 spot, and remained on the chart for 45 weeks. It was the best-selling album released by Pride during his career.

== Track listing ==
No.	Title	Writer(s)	Length
1.	"A Place for the Lonesome"	James Bullington	2:50
2.	"I'd Rather Love You"	Johnny Duncan	2:46
3.	"Is Anybody Goin' to San Antone"	Dave Kirby, Glenn Martin	2:10
4.	"Kiss an Angel Good Mornin'"	Ben Peters	2:02
5.	"(In My World) You Don't Belong"	Duncan	2:21
6.	"(There's Still) Someone I Can't Forget"	Duncan	2:30
7.	"I'm Just Me"	Martin	2:19
8.	"Let Me Live"	Peters	3:21
9.	"(I'm So) Afraid of Losing You Again"	A.L. "Doodle" Owens, Dallas Frazier	3:07
10.	"You'll Still Be the One"	Duncan	2:42

== Charts ==
Chart performance for The Best of Charley Pride, Volume II
Chart (1972)	Peak position
US Billboard 200	50
US Top Country Albums (Billboard)	1
