= When I Stop Leaving (I'll Be Gone) =

Single by Charley Pride

from the album Burgers and Fries/When I Stop Leaving (I'll Be Gone)
- B-side: "I Can See the Lovin' in Your Eyes"
- Released: May 1978
- Genre: Country
- Length: 2:35
- Label: RCA Victor
- Songwriter: Kent Robbins
- Producers: Jerry Bradley, Charley Pride

Charley Pride singles chronology
"Someone Loves You Honey" (1978)	"When I Stop Leaving (I'll Be Gone)" (1978)	"Burgers and Fries" (1978)

"When I Stop Leaving (I'll Be Gone)" is a song written by Kent Robbins, and recorded by American country music artist Charley Pride. It was released in May 1978 as the first single from his album Burgers and Fries/When I Stop Leaving (I'll Be Gone). The song peaked at number 3 on the Billboard Hot Country Singles chart. It also reached number 1 on the RPM Country Tracks chart in Canada.

== Chart performance ==
Chart (1978)	Peak position
US Hot Country Songs (Billboard)	3
Canadian RPM Country Tracks	1
