= Songs of Love by Charley Pride =

Studio album by Charley Pride
- Released: January 1973
- Studio: RCA Studio A, Nashville, Tennessee
- Genre: Country
- Label: RCA Victor

Charley Pride chronology
The Incomparable Charley Pride (1972)	Songs of Love by Charley Pride (1973)	Sweet Country (1973)

Singles from Songs of Love by Charley Pride
- 1. "She's Too Good to Be True" Released: September 1972

Songs of Love by Charley Pride is the fifteenth studio album by the American country music artist of the same name. It was released in 1973 on the RCA Victor label (catalog no. LSP-4837).

The album debuted on Billboard's country album chart on January 27, 1973, spent four weeks at the No. 1 spot, and remained on the chart for a total of 32 weeks. The album also included the No. 1 hit single "She's Too Good to Be True".

It was awarded three stars from the web site AllMusic.

== Track listing ==
No.	Title	Writer(s)	Length
1.	"Too Weak to Let You Go"	Bob Robinson, Donn Tankersley	2:42
2.	"She's Too Good to Be True"	Johnny Duncan	2:51
3.	"She's That Kind"	Ben Peters	2:28
4.	"You Were All the Good in Me"	Shirley Ann Worth	2:41
5.	"Give a Lonely Heart a Home"	Cile Davis, Janice Pitts	2:50
6.	"Good Hearted Woman"	Waylon Jennings, Willie Nelson	2:51
7.	"I Love You More in Memory"	L. E. White	2:31
8.	"My Love Is Deep, My Love Is Wide"	Peters	2:25
9.	"(Darlin' Think Of Me) Every Now and Then"	Duncan	3:10
10.	"I'm Building Bridges"	Bud Reneau, Steve Monahan	2:38

== Charts ==
Chart performance for Songs of Love by Charley Pride
Chart (1973)	Peak position
US Billboard 200	149
US Top Country Albums (Billboard)	1

== See also ==
- Charley Pride discography
