= Kaʻau Crater Boys =

US musical group

- Origin: Oahu, Hawaii
- Genres: Hawaiian Contemporary
- Occupations: Musicians
- Years active: 1990–1997
- Members: Ernie Cruz Jr. Troy Fernandez

Kaʻau Crater Boys were a Hawaiian Contemporary musical duo composed of Ernie Cruz Jr. (vocals, guitar, bass) and Troy Fernandez (ukulele, vocals). They recorded and released four popular Hawaiian Contemporary albums along with a "best of" compilation:

- Tropical Hawaiian Day (1991)
- Valley Style (1993)
- On Fire (1995)
- Making Waves (1996)
- The Best of Kaʻau Crater Boys (1998)

Their work garnered them three Nā Hōkū Hanohano awards (Nā Hōkū Hanohano means "The Distinguished/Glorious Stars", Hawaii's version of the Grammy Awards) from the Hawaiʻi Academy of Recording Arts.

== History ==
The Kaʻau Crater Boys were formed in the early 1990s by Ernie Cruz Jr. (the son of Ernie Cruz Sr. and brother of Guy and John Cruz who are also local entertainers) and Troy Fernandez. At the behest of Ernie's brother John, Troy asked Ernie if he could be a part of his gig at Moose McGillycuddy's Mud Hole. Ernie was reluctant at first, but because they knew each other's family, Ernie helped Troy out.

Their first album, Tropical Hawaiian Day, was released in 1991 and marked the official beginning of Troy and Ernie’s 7-year partnership as one of the most successful groups in contemporary island music.

Cruz played bass, acoustic guitar and handled main vocals for the majority of songs they recorded. Fernandez also played bass, contributed to vocals (mainly as a backing vocalist), but was mostly renowned for his musicianship with the ukulele.

The creation of the Kaʻau Crater Boys also coincided with the resurgence in local Hawaiian customs and tradition, as well as promoting the renaissance of Hawaiian culture, especially among the local youth.

As part of a collective of artists from the Palolo Housing area of Oahu, Cruz and Fernandez earned a steady gig at the Elks Lodge which also opened the door for Troy and Ernie to tour Japan for 6 months.

A last minute appearance a few years later at Moose McGillycuddy’s Pub became a regular gig - this time as “E.T.,” “Ernie/Troy” (a play on names after the popular film, ET – The Extra-Terrestrial). The name Ka'au Crater Boys was actually a name that Ernie's brother John came up with years ago, Ernie asked John if he could use the name. Although John was hesitant at first, he allowed them to use the name.

On September 20, 2016, Ernie Cruz Jr. got into trouble surfing off Sandy Beach. Lifeguards pulled his lifeless body ashore around 2:30pm that afternoon.

== Etymology ==
The name Kaʻau Crater Boys refers to Kaʻau Crater, an extinct volcano above the Palolo Valley of Oahu, near to the Palolo housing community in which Cruz and Fernandez were raised.
