= Amazing Love (Charley Pride album) =

Studio album by Charley Pride
- Released: December 1973
- Genre: Country
- Label: RCA Victor

Charley Pride chronology
Sweet Country (1973)	Amazing Love (1973)	Country Feelin' (1974)

Singles from Amazing Love
- 1. "Amazing Love" Released: September 1973

Amazing Love is the seventeenth studio album by American country music artist Charley Pride. It was released in 1973 on the RCA Victor label (catalog no. APL1-0397).

The album debuted on the Billboard magazine's country album chart on December 29, 1973, peaked at No. 1, and remained on the chart for a total of 27 weeks. The album also included the No. 1 hit single "Amazing Love".

It was awarded three stars from the web site AllMusic.

== Track listing ==
No.	Title	Writer(s)	Length
1.	"Coming Down with Love"	James Bullington	2:17
2.	"If She Helps Me (Get Over You)"	Allen Reynolds, Don Williams	3:04
3.	"I'm Only Losin' Everything I Threw Away"	John Schweers	3:29
4.	"Footprints in the Sands of Time"	Jerry McBee	2:07
5.	"Amazing Love"	Schweers	3:09
6.	"Blue Ridge Mountains Turnin' Green"	Jim Lunsford	3:08
7.	"I've Just Found Another Reason for Loving You"	Charles Isbell, Joe Keene	3:02
8.	"Old Photographs"	Al Urban	3:15
9.	"I'm Glad It Was You"	Ben Peters	2:30
10.	"Mr. Joe Henry's Hand Clappin' Open Air Rhythm Band"	Glenn D. Tubb, Larry Lee	2:41

== Charts ==
Chart performance for Amazing Love
Chart (1973)	Peak position
US Top Country Albums (Billboard)	1

== See also ==
- Charley Pride discography
