= The Sensational Charley Pride =

Studio album by Charley Pride
- Released: May 1969
- Studio: RCA, Nashville, Tennessee
- Genre: Country
- Label: RCA Victor
- Producer: Felton Jarvis, Jack Clement

Charley Pride chronology
| Charley Pride in Person (1969) | The Sensational Charley Pride (1969) | The Best of Charley Pride (1969) |

Singles from The Sensational Charley Pride
- 1. "Let the Chips Fall" Released: September 1968

The Sensational Charley Pride is the sixth studio album by the American country music artist of the same name. It was released on the RCA Victor label (catalog no. LSP-4153). The album was awarded four-and-a-half stars from the web site AllMusic. It debuted on Billboard's country album chart on June 14, 1969, peaked at No. 2, and remained on the chart for 41 weeks.

== Track listing ==
| No. | Title | Writer(s) | Length |
|---|---|---|---|
| 1. | "Louisiana Man" | Doug Kershaw | 2:36 |
| 2. | "She Still Got a Hold on You" | Jack Clement | 2:55 |
| 3. | "Let the Chips Fall" | Clement | 2:40 |
| 4. | "Come On Home and Sing the Blues to Daddy" | Ray Corbin | 2:15 |
| 5. | "Never More Than I" | Alex Zanetis | 2:30 |
| 6. | "Let Me Live Again" | Zanetis | 2:31 |
| 7. | "Take Care of the Little Things" | Zanetis | 2:24 |
| 8. | "Even After Everything She's Done" | Bill Rice, Jerry Foster | 1:55 |
| 9. | "(It's Just a Matter of) Making Up My Mind" | Rice, Foster | 2:23 |
| 10. | "It's the Little Things" | Arlie Duff | 2:48 |
| 11. | "Billy Bayou" | Roger Miller | 2:11 |
| 12. | "We Had All the Good Things Going" | Jerry Monday, Mervin Shiner | 2:41 |

== Charts ==
Chart performance for The Sensational Charley Pride
| Chart (1969) | Peak position |
|---|---|
| US Billboard 200 | 44 |
| US Top Country Albums (Billboard) | 2 |
