= Roll On Mississippi =

Single by Charley Pride

from the album Roll On Mississippi
- B-side: "Fall Back On Me"
- Released: February 1981
- Genre: Country
- Length: 3:34
- Label: RCA
- Songwriter(s): Kye Fleming; Dennis Morgan
- Producer(s): Jerry Bradley; Charley Pride

Charley Pride singles chronology
"You Almost Slipped My Mind" (1980)	"Roll On Mississippi" (1981)	"Never Been So Loved (In All My Life)" (1981)

"Roll On Mississippi" is a song written by Kye Fleming and Dennis Morgan, and recorded by American country music artist Charley Pride. It was released in February 1981 as the second single and title track from his album Roll On Mississippi. The song peaked at number 7 on the Billboard Hot Country Singles chart.

== Chart performance ==
Chart (1981)	Peak position
US Hot Country Songs (Billboard)	7
Canadian RPM Country Tracks	2
