= Charley Pride's 10th Album =

Studio album by Charley Pride
- Released: July 1970
- Studio: RCA Studio A, Nashville
- Genre: Country
- Label: RCA Victor
- Producer: Jack Clement

Charley Pride chronology
Just Plain Charley (1970)	Charley Pride's 10th Album (1970)	Christmas in My Home Town (1970)

Singles from Charley Pride's 10th Album
- 1. "Is Anybody Goin' to San Antone" Released: February 1970

Charley Pride's 10th Album is the eighth studio album by the American country music artist Charley Pride. It was released in 1970 on the RCA Victor label (catalog no. LSP-4367).

The album was awarded four stars from the web site AllMusic. It debuted on Billboard's country album chart on July 25, 1970, peaked at No. 1, and remained on the chart for 49 weeks. The album included the No. 1 hit single "Is Anybody Goin' to San Antone".

== Track listing ==
No.	Title	Writer(s)	Length
1.	"Able Bodied Man"	Bill Rice, Jerry Foster	2:09
2.	"Through the Years"	Rice	2:34
3.	"Is Anybody Goin' to San Antone"	Dave Kirby, Glenn Martin	2:10
4.	"The Thought of Losing You"	Foster	2:46
5.	"I Think I'll Take a Walk"	Jack Clement	2:32
6.	"Things Are Looking Up"	Hugh X. Lewis	2:42
7.	"Special"	Foster	2:04
8.	"A Poor Boy Like Me"	Alex Zanetis	2:38
9.	"(There's) Nobody Home to Go Home To"	Allen Reynolds, Dickey Lee, Milton Addington	2:47
10.	"This Is My Year for Mexico"	Vincent Matthews	3:05

== Charts ==
=== Weekly charts ===
Chart (1970)	Peak position
US Billboard 200	30
US Top Country Albums (Billboard)	1

=== Year-end charts ===
Chart (1970)	Position
US Top Country Albums (Billboard)	6
Chart (1971)	Position
US Top Country Albums (Billboard)	40

== See also ==
- Charley Pride discography
