= A Sunshiny Day with Charley Pride =

Studio album by Charley Pride
- Released: July 1972
- Studio: RCA Studio A, Nashville, Tennessee
- Genre: Country
- Label: RCA Victor

Charley Pride chronology
The Best of Charley Pride, Volume II (1972)	A Sunshiny Day with Charley Pride (1972)	The Incomparable Charley Pride (1972)

Singles from A Sunshiny Day with Charley Pride
- 1. "It's Gonna Take a Little Bit Longer" Released: May 1972

A Sunshiny Day with Charley Pride is the fourteenth studio album by the American country music artist of the same name. It was released in 1972 on the RCA Victor label (catalog no. LSP-4742).

The album debuted on Billboard's country album chart on August 19, 1972, spent 10 weeks at the No. 1 spot, and remained on the chart for a total of 28 weeks. The album also included the No. 1 hit single "It's Gonna Take a Little Bit Longer".

It was awarded two stars from AllMusic.

== Track listing ==
No.	Title	Writer(s)	Length
1.	"Sunshiny Day"	Ben Peters	2:30
2.	"When the Trains Come In"	Al Urban	3:17
3.	"You're Wanting Me to Stop Loving You"	Urban	2:51
4.	"Back to the Country Roads"	Richard Jarvis	1:53
5.	"Put Back My Ring on Your Hand"	Glenn Ash	2:15
6.	"It's Gonna Take a Little Bit Longer"	Peters	2:35
7.	"Seven Years with a Wonderful Woman"	Rev. Roland W. Davis	2:55
8.	"She's Helping Me Get Over You"	A.L. "Doodle" Owens, Hal Bynum	3:03
9.	"One More Year"	Owens, Bynum	2:45
10.	"Nothin' Left but Leavin'"	Johnny Duncan	2:37

== Charts ==
=== Weekly charts ===
Chart (1972)	Peak position
US Billboard 200	115
US Top Country Albums (Billboard)	1

=== Year-end charts ===
Chart (1972)	Position
US Top Country Albums (Billboard)	8
