= (I'm So) Afraid of Losing You Again =

Single by Charley Pride

from the album Just Plain Charley
- B-side: "A Good Chance of Tear-Fall Tonight"
- Released: October 1969
- Genre: Countrypolitan
- Length: 3:08
- Label: RCA Victor
- Songwriters: Dallas Frazier; A.L. "Doodle" Owens
- Producer: Jack Clement

Charley Pride singles chronology
"All I Have to Offer You (Is Me)" (1969)	"(I'm So) Afraid of Losing You Again" (1969)	"Is Anybody Goin' to San Antone" (1970)

"(I'm So) Afraid of Losing You Again" is a song written by Dallas Frazier and A.L. "Doodle" Owens, and recorded by American country music artist Charley Pride. It was released in October 1969 as the first single from the album Just Plain Charley. The song was Pride's second number one on the country charts. The single stayed at number one for three weeks and spent a total of 15 weeks on the country charts.

== Chart performance ==
Chart (1969)	Peak position
US Hot Country Songs (Billboard)	1
US Billboard Hot 100	74
Canadian RPM Country Tracks	1
