= Charley Pride in Person =

Live album by Charley Pride
- Released: January 1969
- Venue: Panther Hall, Fort Worth, Texas
- Genre: Country
- Label: RCA Victor
- Producer: Felton Jarvis, Jack Clement

Charley Pride chronology
Songs of Pride...Charley That Is (1968)	Charley Pride in Person (1969)	The Sensational Charley Pride (1969)

Charley Pride in Person is a live album by country music artist Charley Pride. It was recorded at Panther Hall in Fort Worth, Texas, and released on RCA Victor (catalog no. LSP-4094). The album was awarded four stars from the web site AllMusic. It debuted on Billboard magazine's country album chart on February 8, 1969, peaked at No. 2, and remained on the chart for 34 weeks. In 1975, the album was reissued in the mid-priced RCA "Pure Gold" album series (catalog no. ANL1-0996).

== Track listing ==
Side A

1. "Intro By Bo Powell" [0:30]
2. "The Last Thing On My Mind" (Tom Paxton) [2:00]
3. "Just Between You and Me" (Jack Clement) [2:03]
4. "I Know One" (Jack Clement) [2:08]
5. "Dialogue" [2:14]
6. "Lovesick Blues" (Cliff Friend, Irving Mills) [2:45]
7. "The Image of Me" (Wayne Kemp) [2:48]
8. "Kaw-Liga" (Fred Rose, Hank Williams) [3:00]

Side B

1. "Shutters and Boards" (Audie Murphy, Scott Turner) [2:09]
2. "Six Days On the Road" (Carl Montgomery, Earl Green) [2:30]
3. "Streets of Baltimore" (Harlan Howard, Tompall Glaser) [2:15]
4. "Got Leavin' On Her Mind" (Jack Clement) [2:11]
5. "Crystal Chandeliers" (Ted Harris) [2:35]
6. "Cotton Fields" (Huddie Ledbetter) [2:05]

== Charts ==
Chart performance for Charley Pride in Person
Chart (1969)	Peak position
US Billboard 200	62
US Top Country Albums (Billboard)	2

== See also ==
- Charley Pride discography
