= Sweet Country (album) =

Studio album by Charley Pride
- Released: June 1973
- Studio: RCA Studio A, Nashville, Tennessee
- Genre: Country
- Label: RCA Victor
- Producer: Jack Clement

Charley Pride chronology
Songs of Love by Charley Pride (1973)	Sweet Country (1973)	Amazing Love (1973)

Singles from Sweet Country
- 1. "A Shoulder To Cry On" Released: January 1973; 2. "Don't Fight the Feelings of Love" Released: April 1973

Sweet Country is the sixteenth studio album by American country music artist Charley Pride. It was released in 1973 on the RCA Victor label (catalog no. APL1-0217).

The album debuted on the Billboard magazine's country album chart on June 23, 1973, peaked at the No. 3, and remained on the chart for a total of 39 weeks. The album also included the No. 1 hit singles: "Don't Fight the Feelings of Love" and "A Shoulder to Cry On".

It was awarded three stars from the web site AllMusic.

== Track listing ==
No.	Title	Writer(s)	Length
1.	"Along the Mississippi"	Bob Robinson, Perry Tankersley	2:55
2.	"The Happiest Song on the Jukebox"	Ben Peters	2:48
3.	"The Shelter of Your Eyes"	Don Williams	2:47
4.	"I'm Learning to Love Her"	Johnny Duncan	2:49
5.	"Don't Fight the Feelings of Love"	John Schweers	2:03
6.	"Just to Be Loved by You"	Peters	2:13
7.	"Tennessee Girl"	Peters	2:42
8.	"Love Unending"	Jerry Grindele, Paul Gibbons, Tony Hatch	2:22
9.	"Pass Me By"	Hillman Hall	2:29
10.	"A Shoulder to Cry On"	Merle Haggard	3:06

== Charts ==
Chart performance for Sweet Country
Chart (1973)	Peak position
US Top Country Albums (Billboard)	3

== See also ==
- Charley Pride discography
