= Burgers and Fries =

Single by Charley Pride

from the album Burgers and Fries/When I Stop Leaving (I'll Be Gone)
- B-side: "Nothing's Prettier Than Rose Is"
- Released: October 1978
- Genre: Country
- Length: 3:08
- Label: RCA Victor
- Songwriter: Ben Peters
- Producers: Jerry Bradley; Charley Pride

Charley Pride singles chronology
"When I Stop Leaving (I'll Be Gone)" (1978)	"Burgers and Fries" (1978)	"Where Do I Put Her Memory" (1979)

"Burgers and Fries" is a song written by Ben Peters and recorded by American country music artist Charley Pride. It was released in October 1978 as the second single from his album Burgers and Fries/When I Stop Leaving (I'll Be Gone). The song peaked at number 2 on the Billboard Hot Country Singles chart. It also reached number 1 on the RPM Country Tracks chart in Canada.

== Content ==
The song is a young man's reflection of a relationship that had failed. He recalls how simple things used to be between the two, recalling the simplicity of such things as "burgers and fries and cherry pies," hand-holding walks along the beach and drive-in movies on moonlit nights, all before things changed between the two and he doesn't know why. He then notes he wishes things could go back to the way they were before.

There was renewed interest in the song after it was featured in the 1997 thriller film Breakdown, starring Kurt Russell.

== Chart performance ==
Chart (1978–1979)	Peak position
US Hot Country Songs (Billboard)	2
Canadian RPM Country Tracks	1
