= You're My Jamaica (song) =

Single by Charley Pride

from the album You're My Jamaica
- B-side: "Let Me Have a Chance to Love You (One More Time)"
- Released: July 1979
- Genre: Country
- Length: 3:31
- Label: RCA Victor
- Songwriter: Kent Robbins
- Producers: Jerry Bradley, Charley Pride

Charley Pride singles chronology
"Where Do I Put Her Memory" (1979)	"You're My Jamaica" (1979)	"Missin' You" (1979)

"You're My Jamaica" is a song written by Kent Robbins, and recorded by American country music artist Charley Pride. It was released in July 1979 as the first single and title track from the album You're My Jamaica. The song was Pride's twenty-second number one country hit. The single stayed at number one for one week and spent a total of ten weeks on the country chart.

== Cover versions ==
- Pride re-recorded the song as a duet with Neal McCoy on McCoy's 2005 album That's Life.

== Charts ==
=== Weekly charts ===
Chart (1979)	Peak position
US Hot Country Songs (Billboard)	1
Canadian RPM Country Tracks	1

=== Year-end charts ===
Chart (1979)	Position
US Hot Country Songs (Billboard)	21
