= Just Plain Charley =

Studio album by Charley Pride
- Released: February 1970
- Studio: RCA Victor, Nashville, Tennessee
- Genre: Country
- Label: RCA Victor
- Producer: Jack Clement (all tracks), Felton Jarvis (Side B: tracks 2–4)

Charley Pride chronology
The Best of Charley Pride (1969)	Just Plain Charley (1970)	Charley Pride's 10th Album (1970)

Singles from Just Plain Charley
- 1. "(I'm So) Afraid of Losing You Again" Released: October 1969

Just Plain Charley is the seventh studio album by American country music artist Charley Pride. It was released in 1970 on the RCA Victor label (catalog no. LSP-4290). It included the No. 1 hit "(I'm So) Afraid of Losing You Again".

The album was awarded three stars from the web site AllMusic. It debuted on Billboard's country album chart on February 21, 1970, peaked at No. 1, and remained on the chart for 42 weeks.

== Track listing ==
No.	Title	Writer(s)	Length
1.	"Me and Bobby McGee"	Fred Foster, Kris Kristofferson	3:29
2.	"A Good Chance of Tear-Fall Tonight"	Carolyn Stringer, L. E. White	2:46
3.	"One Time"	Bill Rice, Jerry Foster	2:27
4.	"(I'm So) Afraid of Losing You Again"	A.L. "Doodle" Owens, Dallas Frazier	3:07
5.	"A Brand New Bed of Roses"	Alex Zanetis	2:14
6.	"That's Why I Love You So Much"	Rice, J. Foster	2:36
7.	"If You Had Only Taken the Time"	Kent Westberry, Mervin Shiner	2:15
8.	"Gone, Gone, Gone"	Buckley Maxwell, Jerry Crutchfield	2:53
9.	"Happy Street"	Ben Peters	2:12
10.	"I'm a Lonesome Fugitive"	Casey Anderson, Liz Anderson	3:07
11.	"It's All Right"	Betty Jean Robinson	2:31

== Charts ==
=== Weekly charts ===
Chart (1970)	Peak position
US Billboard 200	22
US Top Country Albums (Billboard)	1

=== Year-end charts ===
Chart (1970)	Position
US Billboard 200	95
US Top Country Albums (Billboard)	3

== See also ==
- Charley Pride discography
