= Where Do I Put Her Memory =

Single by Charley Pride

from the album Burgers and Fries/When I Stop Leaving (I'll Be Gone)
- B-side: "Best in the World"
- Released: February 1979
- Genre: Country
- Length: 4:04
- Label: RCA Victor
- Songwriter: Jim Weatherly
- Producers: Jerry Bradley; Charley Pride

Charley Pride singles chronology
"Burgers and Fries" (1978)	"Where Do I Put Her Memory" (1979)	"You're My Jamaica" (1979)

"Where Do I Put Her Memory" is a song written by Jim Weatherly and recorded by American country music artist Charley Pride. It was released in February 1979 as the third single from the album Burgers and Fries/When I Stop Leaving (I'll Be Gone). The song is Pride's twenty-first number one on the country chart and stayed at number one for one week and spent a total of ten weeks on the country chart.

== Charts ==
=== Weekly charts ===
Chart (1979)	Peak position
US Hot Country Songs (Billboard)	1
Canadian RPM Country Tracks	1

=== Year-end charts ===
Chart (1979)	Position
US Hot Country Songs (Billboard)	14
