= Just Between You and Me (Charley Pride song) =

Single by Charley Pride

from the album Pride of Country Music
- B-side: "Detroit City"
- Released: September 1966
- Recorded: May 10, 1966
- Studio: RCA Studio A, Nashville, Tennessee
- Genre: Country; traditional country
- Length: 2:13
- Label: RCA Victor
- Songwriter(s): Jack Clement
- Producer(s): Chet Atkins; Jack Clement; Bob Ferguson

Charley Pride singles chronology
"Before I Met You" (1966)	"Just Between You and Me" (1966)	"I Know One" (1967)

"Just Between You and Me" is a song written by Jack Clement, and recorded by American country music artist Charley Pride. It was released in September 1966 as the first single from the album Pride of Country Music. The song was Pride's third single and his first major hit as a recording artist.

== Background and content ==
In 1966, Charley Pride secured his first recording contract with RCA Victor Records. Pride would record many of his hit singles under the supervision of Jack Clement. With his first two singles, RCA did not include a promotional photograph of Pride's face in anticipation that disc jockeys would fail to play him because of his skin color. His first two singles ("The Snakes Crawl at Night" and "Before I Met You") failed to become hits. In need of a hit, Clement composed "Just Between You and Me." The song was recorded at the RCA Victor Studio on May 10, 1966. The session was co-produced by Clement, Chet Atkins, and Bob Ferguson.

== Release and reception ==
"Just Between You and Me" was released as a single via RCA Victor Records in September 1966. It was Pride's third single. He was credited as "Country Charley Pride." The song became Pride's first charting single and first major hit as a music artist, spending a total of 19 weeks on the Billboard Hot Country Singles chart before peaking at number nine in February 1967. It was later released on Pride's 1967 RCA studio album Pride of Country Music.

== Track listings ==
7" vinyl single

- "Just Between You and Me" – 2:09
- "Detroit City" – 2:13

== Chart performance ==
Chart (1966–1967)	Peak position
US Hot Country Songs (Billboard)	9
