= Carroll Baker discography =

- Studio albums: 14
- Compilation albums: 4
- Singles: 56

The discography of Canadian country music artist Carroll Baker consists of 14 studio albums, four compilation albums, and 56 singles. Between 1970 and 1992, Baker charted 53 songs on the RPM Country Tracks chart in Canada, including 14 number one hits.

== Albums ==
=== Studio albums ===
Title	Details	Peak positions		Certifications
Title	Details	CAN Country	CAN	Certifications
Mem'ries of Home	Release date: 1970; Label: Columbia	—	—	
Carroll Baker	Release date: 1971; Label: Columbia	—	—	
I'd Go Through It All Again	Release date: 1974; Label: Gaiety	—	—	
Carroll Baker	Release date: 1976; Label: RCA	—	26	CAN: Platinum
Sweet Sensation	Release date: 1977; Label: RCA	8	41	
If It Wasn't for You	Release date: 1978; Label: RCA	2	—	
Hollywood Love	Release date: 1979; Label: RCA	2	—	
All for the Love of a Song	Release date: 1980; Label: RCA	6	—	
Carroll Baker	Release date: 1981; Label: Excelsior	—	—	
A Step in the Right Direction	Release date: 1983; Label: Tembo	19	—	
Hymns of Gold	Release date: 1983; Label: Tembo	—	88	CAN: Platinum
Heartbreak to Happiness	Release date: 1985; Label: Tembo	—	—	
At Home in the Country	Release date: 1987; Label: Tembo	—	—	
Christmas Carroll	Release date: 1989; Label: Tembo	—	96	
"—" denotes releases that did not chart

=== Compilation albums ===
Title	Details	Certifications
20 Country Classics	Release date: 1978; Label: Tee Vee	CAN: Platinum
Carroll Baker's Greatest Hits	Release date: 1981; Label: RCA	CAN: Gold
Her Finest Collection	Release date: 1991; Label: Tembo	
From the Beginning	Release date: 1998; Label: EMI	

== Singles ==
=== 1970s ===
Year	Single	Peak positions			Album
Year	Single	CAN Country	CAN	CAN AC	Album
1970	"Mem'ries of Home"	21	—	—	Mem'ries of Home
1971	"Love Now and Pay Later"	15	—	—	Carroll Baker (1971)
1971	"A Hit in Any Language"	40	—	—	Carroll Baker (1971)
1971	"It's Late (And I Have to Go)"	44	—	—	Mem'ries of Home
1972	"That's How My Heart Beats for You"	16	—	—	Non-album singles
1972	"The World I Know Is Now"	16	—	—	Non-album singles
1973	"Wichita"	27	—	—	I'd Go Through It All Again
1973	"All Them Irons in the Fire"	67	—	—	I'd Go Through It All Again
1974	"Ten Little Fingers"	3	—	—	I'd Go Through It All Again
1974	"Little Boy Blue"	16	—	—	I'd Go Through It All Again
1974	"I'd Go Through It All Again"	10	97	—	I'd Go Through It All Again
1975	"I've Never Been This Far Before"	1	—	—	Carroll Baker (1976)
1975	"The Hungry Fire of Love"	1	—	—	Carroll Baker (1976)
1975	"One Night of Cheatin' (Ain't Worth the Reapin')"	1	—	—	Carroll Baker (1976)
1976	"Tonight with Love"	1	—	—	Carroll Baker (1976)
1976	"Why I Had to Pass This Way"	1	67	—	Carroll Baker (1976)
1977	"It's My Party"	1	—	—	Sweet Sensation
1977	"It's Late (And I Have to Go)" (re-recording)	1	—	—	Sweet Sensation
1977	"The Morning After Baby Let Me Down"	1	79	—	Sweet Sensation
1977	"Cryin' Places"	—	—	—	I'd Go Through It All Again
1977	"I Might as Well Believe (I'll Live Forever)"	1	—	—	Sweet Sensation
1978	"Portrait in the Window"	1	—	—	Sweet Sensation
1978	"Hooked on a Feeling"	1	—	15	If It Wasn't for You
1979	"I'm Getting High Remembering"	1	41	—	If It Wasn't for You
1979	"Build My Life Around You"	5	—	—	If It Wasn't for You
1979	"My Turn"	5	—	23	Hollywood Love
"—" denotes releases that did not chart

=== 1980s and 1990s ===
Year	Single	Peak positions			Album
Year	Single	CAN Country	CAN AC	US Country	Album
1980	"Hollywood Love"	1	14	—	Hollywood Love
1980	"Still Falling in Love"	1	11	—	All for the Love of a Song
1981	"Breaking and Entering"	15	12	—	All for the Love of a Song
1981	"Mama What Does Cheatin' Mean"	12	—	82	Carroll Baker (1981)
1981	"Ain't Nothing Like a Rainy Night"	—	—	—	Carroll Baker (1981)
1981	"Brand New Tears (For an Old Heartache)"	6	—	—	All for the Love of a Song
1982	"The Second Time Around"	4	—	—	Hollywood Love
1982	"Love Hangover"	8	—	—	A Step in the Right Direction
1982	"I'm So Excited"	—	26	—	A Step in the Right Direction
1983	"Too Hot to Sleep Tonight" (with Eddie Eastman)	35	—	—	A Step in the Right Direction
1983	"Right or Wrong"	18	12	—	A Step in the Right Direction
1984	"A Step in the Right Direction"	30	—	—	A Step in the Right Direction
1984	"Heart on the Run"	10	—	—	A Step in the Right Direction
1984	"You Are My Everything"	44	—	—	Heartbreak to Happiness
1985	"I'm an Old Rock And Roller (Dancin' to a Different Beat)"	38	—	—	Heartbreak to Happiness
1985	"It Always Hurts Like the First Time"	5	—	95	Heartbreak to Happiness
1985	"If You Can't Stand the Heat Don't Light the Fire"	9	—	—	Heartbreak to Happiness
1986	"A Star in Momma's Eyes"	24	—	—	Heartbreak to Happiness
1986	"I'm Taking Care of Myself"	9	16	—	Heartbreak to Happiness
1986	"Arms That Love (Hearts That Don't)"	6	—	—	Heartbreak to Happiness
1987	"Death & Taxes & Me Lovin' You"	10	—	—	At Home in the Country
1987	"Cheater's Moon"	7	—	—	At Home in the Country
1988	"You've Lost That Lovin' Feelin'"	7	7	—	At Home in the Country
1988	"I'd Fall for That Feelin'"	25	—	—	At Home in the Country
1989	"As Long as We Both Shall Love"	10	—	—	At Home in the Country
1990	"Dreamin' Ain't Cheatin'"	10	—	—	At Home in the Country
1990	"It's Only Make Believe"	28	—	—	Her Finest Collection
1991	"I Should Have Put a Hold on Love"	16	—	—	Her Finest Collection
1991	"It's How You Make Love Good"	47	—	—	Her Finest Collection
1992	"Burning Bridges" (with Jack Scott)	55	—	—	Non-album single
"—" denotes releases that did not chart

=== As featured artist ===
Year	Single	Peak positions	Album
Year	Single	CAN Country	Album
1985	"How Close Am I to Losing You" (Eddie Eastman with Carroll Baker)	49	The Winning Side
