= List of RPM number-one country singles of 1976 =

These are the Canadian number-one country songs of 1976, per the RPM Country Tracks chart.

Issue date	Title	Artist
January 10	Easy as Pie	Billy "Crash" Craddock
January 17	Country Boy (You Got Your Feet in L.A.)	Glen Campbell
January 24	Country Boy (You Got Your Feet in L.A.)	Glen Campbell
January 31	The Blind Man in the Bleachers	Kenny Starr
February 7	This Time I Hurt Her More than She Loves Me	Conway Twitty
February 14	The Happiness of Having You	Charley Pride
February 21	Don't Believe My Heart Can Stand Another You	Tanya Tucker
February 28	Somebody Loves You	Crystal Gayle
March 6	One Way Ticket to a Lady	Jerry Palmer
March 13	One Night of Cheatin'	Carroll Baker
March 20	On the Road	Dick Damron
March 27	Motels and Memories	T. G. Sheppard
April 3	Angels, Roses and Rain	Dickey Lee
April 10	You Are the Song (Inside of Me)	Freddie Hart
April 17	(Till) I Kissed You	Connie Smith
April 24	If I Let Her Come In	Ray Griff
May 1	'Til I Can Make it On My Own	Tammy Wynette
May 8	Drinkin' My Baby (Off My Mind)	Eddie Rabbitt
May 15	Don't the Girls All Get Prettier at Closing Time	Mickey Gilley
May 22	My Eyes Can Only See As Far As You	Charley Pride
May 29	What Goes On When the Sun Goes Down	Ronnie Milsap
June 5	After All the Good is Gone	Conway Twitty
June 12	After All the Good is Gone	Conway Twitty
June 19	One Piece at a Time	Johnny Cash
June 26	El Paso City	Marty Robbins
July 3	I Wouldn't Want It Any Other Way	Lyle
July 10	Tonight with Love	Carroll Baker
July 17	The Door is Always Open	Dave & Sugar
July 24	Vaya con Dios	Freddy Fender
July 31	Here Comes the Freedom Train	Merle Haggard
August 7	Teddy Bear	Red Sovine
August 14	Teddy Bear	Red Sovine
August 21	The Letter	Conway Twitty and Loretta Lynn
August 28	The Letter	Conway Twitty and Loretta Lynn
September 4	Rocky Mountain Music	Eddie Rabbitt
September 11	Bring It On Home to Me	Mickey Gilley
September 18	(I'm A) Stand by My Woman Man	Ronnie Milsap
September 25	(I'm A) Stand by My Woman Man	Ronnie Milsap
October 2	Can't You See	Waylon Jennings
October 9	All I Can Do	Dolly Parton
October 16	If You Keep Throwing Dirt	Family Brown
October 23	All I Can Do	Dolly Parton
October 30	The Games That Daddies Play	Conway Twitty
November 6	The Wreck of the Edmund Fitzgerald	Gordon Lightfoot
November 13	Why I Had to Pass This Way	Carroll Baker
November 20	A Whole Lotta Things to Sing About	Charley Pride
November 27	Cherokee Maiden	Merle Haggard
December 4	Somebody Somewhere (Don't Know What He's Missin' Tonight)	Loretta Lynn
December 11	Living It Down	Freddy Fender
December 18	Good Woman Blues	Mel Tillis
December 25	Thinkin' of a Rendezvous	Johnny Duncan

== See also ==
- 1976 in music
- List of number-one country hits of 1976 (U.S.)
