= Glee singles discography =

This is the singles discography for Glee.

== Singles ==
=== Season 1: 2009–2010 ===
List of singles, with selected chart positions and certifications, showing album name and episode name
Title	Peak chart positions							Certifications	Album	Episode
Title	AUS	CAN	FRA	IRL	NL	UK	US	Certifications	Album	Episode
"Don't Stop Believin'"	5	37	48	4	91	2	4	RIAA: Platinum; ARIA: Platinum; BPI: Platinum	Glee: The Music, Volume 1	"Pilot"
"Rehab"	93	—	—	38	—	62	98		Glee: The Music, The Complete Season One	"Pilot"
"Can't Fight This Feeling"	—	—	—	—	—	117	—		Glee: The Music, Volume 1	"Pilot"
"On My Own"	—	—	—	42	—	73	—		Glee: The Music, The Complete Season One	"Pilot"
"Gold Digger"	59	—	—	15	—	44	— (Note: "Gold Digger" did not enter the Billboard Hot 100, but did peak at number 8 on the Bubbling Under Hot 100 extension chart.)		Glee: The Music, Volume 1	"Showmance"
"Take a Bow"	38	73	—	19	—	36	46		Glee: The Music, Volume 1	"Showmance"
"Push It"	60	—	—	35	—	96	—		Glee: The Music, The Complete Season One	"Showmance"
"Mercy"	—	—	—	49	—	94	—		Glee: The Music, The Complete Season One	"Acafellas"
"Bust Your Windows"	—	—	—	35	—	57	— (Note: "Bust Your Windows" did not enter the Billboard Hot 100, but did peak at number 7 on the Bubbling Under Hot 100 extension chart.)		Glee: The Music, Volume 1	"Acafellas"
"Taking Chances"	79	73	—	28	—	76	71		Glee: The Music, Volume 1	"Preggers"
"Maybe This Time" (featuring Kristin Chenoweth)	100	— (Note: "Maybe This Time" did not enter the Canadian Hot 100, but did peak at number 65 on the Canadian Digital Song Sales chart.)	—	—	—	87	88		Glee: The Music, Volume 1	"The Rhodes Not Taken"
"Alone" (featuring Kristin Chenoweth)	94	58	—	25	—	47	51		Glee: The Music, Volume 1	"The Rhodes Not Taken"
"Somebody to Love"^{[a]}	65	33	—	10	—	26	28		Glee: The Music, Volume 1	"The Rhodes Not Taken"
"Last Name" (featuring Kristin Chenoweth)	—	—	—	44	—	83	— (Note: "Last Name" did not enter the Billboard Hot 100, but did peak at number 8 on the Bubbling Under Hot 100 extension chart.)		Glee: The Music, The Complete Season One	"The Rhodes Not Taken"
"It's My Life / Confessions, Pt. II"	22	25	—	6	—	14	30		Glee: The Music, The Complete Season One	"Vitamin D"
"Halo / Walking on Sunshine"	10	28	—	4	—	9	40	ARIA: Gold	Glee: The Music, The Complete Season One	"Vitamin D"
"No Air"	52	65	—	29	—	52	65		Glee: The Music, Volume 1	"Throwdown"
"Keep Holding On"^{[a]}	56	58	—	22	—	47	56		Glee: The Music, Volume 1	"Throwdown"
"Hate on Me"	—	— (Note: "Hate on Me" did not enter the Canadian Hot 100, but did peak at number 67 on the Canadian Digital Song Sales chart.)	—	—	—	121	— (Note: "Hate on Me" did not enter the Billboard Hot 100, but did peak at number 2 on the Bubbling Under Hot 100 extension chart.)		Glee: The Music, Volume 1	"Throwdown"
"You Keep Me Hangin' On"	—	—	—	—	—	166	— (Note: "You Keep Me Hangin' On" did not enter the Billboard Hot 100, but did peak at number 23 on the Bubbling Under Hot 100 extension chart.)		Glee: The Music, Volume 1	"Throwdown"
"Sweet Caroline"	37	22	—	—	—	59	34		Glee: The Music, Volume 1	"Mash-Up"
"Bust a Move"	—	78	—	—	—	148	93		Glee: The Music, Volume 1	"Mash-Up"
"Thong Song"	—	—	—	—	—	99	— (Note: "Thong Song" did not enter the Billboard Hot 100, but did peak at number 16 on the Bubbling Under Hot 100 extension chart.)		Glee: The Music, The Complete Season One	"Mash-Up"
"Dancing with Myself"	—	— (Note: "Dancing with Myself" did not enter the Billboard Canadian Hot 100, but did peak at number 72 on the Canadian Digital Song Sales chart.)	—	—	—	119	— (Note: "Dancing with Myself" did not enter the Billboard Hot 100, but did peak at number 19 on the Bubbling Under Hot 100 extension chart.)		Glee: The Music, Volume 1	"Wheels"
"Defying Gravity"^{[b]}	58	38	—	19	59	38	31		Glee: The Music, Volume 1	"Wheels"
"Proud Mary"	—	— (Note: "Proud Mary" did not enter the Canadian Hot 100, but did peak at number 73 on the Canadian Digital Song Sales chart.)	—	—	—	93	— (Note: "Proud Mary" did not enter the Billboard Hot 100, but did peak at number 15 on the Bubbling Under Hot 100 extension chart.)		Glee: The Music, Volume 2	"Wheels"
"Endless Love"	—	87	—	—	—	94	78		Glee: The Music, Volume 2	"Ballad"
"I'll Stand by You"	—	65	—	—	—	101	73		Glee: The Music, Volume 2	"Ballad"
"Don't Stand So Close to Me / Young Girl"	—	67	—	50	—	62	64		Glee: The Music, Volume 2	"Ballad"
"Crush"	—	—	—	—	—	133	— (Note: "Crush" did not enter the Billboard Hot 100, but did peak at number 20 on the Bubbling Under Hot 100 extension chart.)		Glee: The Music, Volume 2	"Ballad"
"(You're) Having My Baby"	—	—	—	—	—	—	—		Glee: The Music, Volume 2	"Ballad"
"Lean on Me"^{[a]}	76	39	—	32	100	43	50		Glee: The Music, Volume 2	"Ballad"
"Don't Make Me Over"	—	—	—	—	—	—	—		Glee: The Music, Volume 2	"Hairography"
"Imagine"	82	49	—	32	—	57	67		Glee: The Music, Volume 2	"Hairography"
"True Colors"^{[a]}	47	38	—	15	—	35	66		Glee: The Music, Volume 2	"Hairography"
"Papa Don't Preach"	—	— (Note: "Papa Don't Preach" did not enter the Canadian Hot 100, but did peak at number 75 on the Canadian Digital Song Sales extension chart.)	—	—	—	81	— (Note: "Papa Don't Preach" did not enter the Billboard Hot 100, but did peak at number 21 on the Bubbling Under Hot 100 extension chart.)		Glee: The Music, The Complete Season One	"Hairography"
"Bootylicious"	—	—	—	—	—	127	—		Glee: The Music, The Complete Season One	"Hairography"
"Hair / Crazy in Love"	—	—	—	—	—	120	—		Glee: The Music, The Complete Season One	"Hairography"
"Jump"	—	—	—	—	—	106	— (Note: "Jump" did not enter the Billboard Hot 100, but did peak at number 4 on the Bubbling Under Hot 100 extension chart.)		Glee: The Music, Volume 2	"Mattress"
"Smile" (cover of Lily Allen song)	—	—	—	—	—	168	— (Note: "Smile" (cover of Lily Allen song) did not enter the Billboard Hot 100, but did peak at number 14 on the Bubbling Under Hot 100 extension chart.)		Glee: The Music, Volume 2	"Mattress"
"Smile" (cover of Charlie Chaplin song)	—	—	—	—	—	190	— (Note: "Smile" (cover of Charlie Chaplin song) did not enter the Billboard Hot 100, but did peak at number 2 on the Bubbling Under Hot 100 extension chart.)		Glee: The Music, Volume 2	"Mattress"
"And I Am Telling You I'm Not Going"	—	85	—	—	—	93	94		Glee: The Music, Volume 2	"Sectionals"
"Don't Rain on My Parade"	—	59	—	—	—	80	53		Glee: The Music, Volume 2	"Sectionals"
"You Can't Always Get What You Want"	—	51	—	—	—	138	71		Glee: The Music, Volume 2	"Sectionals"
"My Life Would Suck Without You"^{[a]}	66	40	—	29	94	53	51		Glee: The Music, Volume 2	"Sectionals"
"Hello, I Love You"	—	49	—	43	—	69	66		Glee: The Music, The Complete Season One	"Hell-O"
"Highway to Hell" (featuring Jonathan Groff)	—	88	—	—	—	89	— (Note: "Highway to Hell" did not enter the Billboard Hot 100, but did peak at number 3 on the Bubbling Under Hot 100 extension chart.)		Glee: The Music, The Complete Season One	"Hell-O"
"Gives You Hell"	47	17	—	1	—	14	32		Glee: The Music, Volume 3 Showstoppers	"Hell-O"
"Hello" (featuring Jonathan Groff)	79	37	—	31	—	35	35		Glee: The Music, Volume 3 Showstoppers	"Hell-O"
"Hello Goodbye"	66	23	—	24	—	48	49		Glee: The Music, Volume 3 Showstoppers	"Hell-O"
"Express Yourself"	—	—	—	—	—	132	— (Note: "Express Yourself" did not enter the Billboard Hot 100, but did peak at number 16 on the Bubbling Under Hot 100 extension chart.)		Glee: The Music, The Power of Madonna	"The Power of Madonna"
"Borderline / Open Your Heart"	—	74	—	—	—	66	78		Glee: The Music, The Power of Madonna	"The Power of Madonna"
"Vogue"	—	—	—	—	—	106	—		Glee: The Music, The Power of Madonna	"The Power of Madonna"
"Like a Virgin" (featuring Jonathan Groff)	99	83	—	47	—	58	87		Glee: The Music, The Power of Madonna	"The Power of Madonna"
"4 Minutes"	—	70	—	32	—	42	89		Glee: The Music, The Power of Madonna	"The Power of Madonna"
"What It Feels Like for a Girl"	—	—	—	—	—	125	—		Glee: The Music, The Power of Madonna	"The Power of Madonna"
"Like a Prayer" (featuring Jonathan Groff)	28	27	—	2	—	16	27		Glee: The Music, The Power of Madonna	"The Power of Madonna"
"Fire" (featuring Kristin Chenoweth)	—	52	—	—	—	93	64		Glee: The Music, The Complete Season One	"Home"
"A House Is Not a Home"	—	70	—	—	—	94	70		Glee: The Music, Volume 3 Showstoppers	"Home"
"One Less Bell to Answer / A House Is Not a Home" (featuring Kristin Chenoweth)	—	63	—	—	—	77	53		Glee: The Music, Volume 3 Showstoppers	"Home"
"Beautiful"	89	44	—	39	—	64	61		Glee: The Music, Volume 3 Showstoppers	"Home"
"Home" (featuring Kristin Chenoweth)	—	92	—	—	—	116	90		Glee: The Music, Volume 3 Showstoppers	"Home"
"Physical" (featuring Olivia Newton-John)	88	61	—	—	—	56	89		Glee: The Music, Volume 3 Showstoppers	"Bad Reputation"
"Total Eclipse of the Heart" (featuring Jonathan Groff)	28	17	86	3	—	9	16		Glee: The Music, Volume 3 Showstoppers	"Bad Reputation"
"Ice Ice Baby"	—	43	—	—	—	52	74		Glee: The Music, The Complete Season One	"Bad Reputation"
"Run Joey Run" (featuring Jonathan Groff)	64	45	—	12	—	27	61		Glee: The Music, The Complete Season One	"Bad Reputation"
"U Can't Touch This"	—	62	—	—	—	63	92		Glee: The Music, The Complete Season One	"Bad Reputation"
"Jessie's Girl"	8	10	—	8	—	33	23	ARIA: Gold	Glee: The Music, The Complete Season One	"Laryngitis"
"The Boy Is Mine"	97	60	—	46	—	62	76		Glee: The Music, The Complete Season One	"Laryngitis"
"Lady Is a Tramp"	—	72	—	—	—	93	81		Glee: The Music, Volume 3 Showstoppers	"Laryngitis"
"Rose's Turn"	—	90	—	—	—	126	93		Glee: The Music, Volume 3 Showstoppers	"Laryngitis"
"One"	—	42	—	23	—	56	60		Glee: The Music, Volume 3 Showstoppers	"Laryngitis"
"Dream On" (featuring Neil Patrick Harris)	91	24	—	44	—	47	26		Glee: The Music, Volume 3 Showstoppers	"Dream On"
"Safety Dance"	53	55	—	—	—	88	81		Glee: The Music, Volume 3 Showstoppers	"Dream On"
"I Dreamed a Dream" (featuring Idina Menzel)	—	45	—	36	—	36	31		Glee: The Music, Volume 3 Showstoppers	"Dream On"
"Dream a Little Dream"	—	94	—	—	—	115	— (Note: "Dream a Little Dream" did not enter the Billboard Hot 100, but did peak at number 2 on the Bubbling Under Hot 100 extension chart.)		Glee: The Music, The Complete Season One	"Dream On"
"Shout It Out Loud"	—	—	—	—	—	188	—		Glee: The Music, The Complete Season One	"Theatricality"
"Funny Girl" (featuring Idina Menzel)	—	—	—	—	—	—	— (Note: "Funny Girl" did not enter the Billboard Hot 100, but did peak at number 17 on the Bubbling Under Hot 100 extension chart.)		Glee: The Music, The Complete Season One	"Theatricality"
"Poker Face" (featuring Idina Menzel)	25	26	100	16	—	27	20		Glee: The Music, Volume 3 Showstoppers	"Theatricality"
"Beth"	87	41	—	—	—	98	72		Glee: The Music, Volume 3 Showstoppers	"Theatricality"
"Bad Romance"	51	46	—	10	—	41	54		Glee: The Music, Volume 3 Showstoppers	"Theatricality"
"Loser"	—	65	—	—	—	88	93		Glee: The Music, Volume 3 Showstoppers	"Funk"
"Give Up the Funk"	—	— (Note: "Give Up the Funk" did not enter the Canadian Hot 100, but did peak at number 74 on the Canadian Digital Song Sales chart.)	—	—	—	87	— (Note: "Give Up the Funk" did not enter the Billboard Hot 100, but did peak at number 6 on the Bubbling Under Hot 100 extension chart.)		Glee: The Music, Volume 3 Showstoppers	"Funk"
"Another One Bites the Dust" (featuring Jonathan Groff)^{[d]}	—	53	—	41	—	101	79		Glee: The Music, The Complete Season One	"Funk"
"Tell Me Something Good"	—	81	—	—	—	123	87		Glee: The Music, The Complete Season One	"Funk"
"It's a Man's Man's Man's World"	—	73	—	—	—	94	95		Glee: The Music, The Complete Season One	"Funk"
"Good Vibrations"	41	35	—	—	—	77	69		Glee: The Music, The Complete Season One	"Funk"
"—" denotes a release that did not chart.

=== Season 2: 2010–2011 ===
List of singles, with selected chart positions, showing album name and episode name
Title	Peak chart positions					Certifications	Album	Episode
Title	AUS	CAN	IRL	UK	US	Certifications	Album	Episode
"Telephone"	30	17	18	25	23		Glee: The Music, The Complete Season Two	"Audition"
"Listen"	87	51	33	51	38		Glee: The Music, The Complete Season Two	"Audition"
"What I Did for Love"	—	63	—	96	51		Glee: The Music, Love Songs	"Audition"
"Empire State of Mind"	20	25	20	35	21		Glee: The Music, Volume 4	"Audition"
"Billionaire"	34	24	15	48	28		Glee: The Music, Volume 4	"Audition"
"Me Against the Music"	93	54	—	110	56		Glee: The Music, Volume 4	"Britney/Brittany"
"Stronger"	—	47	—	189	53		Glee: The Music, Volume 4	"Britney/Brittany"
"Toxic"	37	15	17	40	16		Glee: The Music, Volume 4	"Britney/Brittany"
"The Only Exception"	53	22	22	45	26		Glee: The Music, Volume 4	"Britney/Brittany"
"I'm a Slave 4 U"	—	49	—	97	52		Glee: The Music, Dance Party	"Britney/Brittany"
"Baby One More Time"	—	50	—	104	54		Glee: The Music, The Complete Season Two	"Britney/Brittany"
"Only the Good Die Young"	49	39	—	113	50		Glee: The Music, The Complete Season Two	"Grilled Cheesus"
"I Look to You"	—	74	—	137	74		Glee: The Music, The Complete Season Two	"Grilled Cheesus"
"Papa Can You Hear Me?"	—	67	—	124	65		Glee: The Music, The Complete Season Two	"Grilled Cheesus"
"Losing My Religion"	—	47	—	82	60		Glee: The Music, The Complete Season Two	"Grilled Cheesus"
"Bridge over Troubled Water"	—	69	—	138	73		Glee: The Music, The Complete Season Two	"Grilled Cheesus"
"I Want to Hold Your Hand"	89	21	37	74	36		Glee: The Music, Volume 4	"Grilled Cheesus"
"One of Us"	—	27	31	84	37		Glee: The Music, Volume 4	"Grilled Cheesus"
"River Deep, Mountain High"	44	36	30	45	41		Glee: The Music, Volume 4	"Duets"
"Lucky"	57	17	45	67	27		Glee: The Music, Volume 4	"Duets"
"Don't Go Breaking My Heart"	96	31	—	79	50		Glee: The Music, Love Songs	"Duets"
"Le Jazz Hot"	—	88	—	—	94		Glee: The Music, The Complete Season Two	"Duets"
"Sing!"	—	67	—	183	87		Glee: The Music, The Complete Season Two	"Duets"
"Happy Days Are Here Again / Get Happy"	—	55	—	105	48		Glee: The Music, The Complete Season Two	"Duets"
"Start Me Up / Livin' on a Prayer"	49	22	30	39	31		Glee: The Music, The Complete Season Two	"Never Been Kissed"
"Stop! In the Name of Love / Free Your Mind"	77	28	—	61	38		Glee: The Music, The Complete Season Two	"Never Been Kissed"
"One Love (People Get Ready)"	—	32	—	104	41		Glee: The Music, Volume 4	"Never Been Kissed"
"Teenage Dream" ^{[e]}	24	10	18	36	8	RIAA: Gold	Glee: The Music, Volume 4	"Never Been Kissed"
"Forget You" (featuring Gwyneth Paltrow)	24	12	20	31	11		Glee: The Music, Volume 4	"The Substitute"
"Make 'Em Laugh"	—	—	—	—	— (Note: "Make 'em Laugh" did not enter the Billboard Hot 100, but did peak at number 23 on the Bubbling Under Hot 100 extension chart.)		Glee: The Music, The Complete Season Two	"The Substitute"
"Nowadays / Hot Honey Rag" (featuring Gwyneth Paltrow)	—	—	—	153	— (Note: "Nowadays / Hot Honey Rag" did not enter the Billboard Hot 100, but did peak at number 10 on the Bubbling Under Hot 100 extension chart.)		Glee: The Music, The Complete Season Two	"The Substitute"
"Singing in the Rain / Umbrella" (featuring Gwyneth Paltrow)	23	20	10	22	18		Glee: The Music, The Complete Season Two	"The Substitute"
"Ohio" (featuring Carol Burnett)	—	—	—	—	—		Glee: The Music, The Complete Season Two	"Furt"
"Marry You"	27	19	31	51	32		Glee: The Music, Volume 4	"Furt"
"Sway"	—	— (Note: "Sway" did not enter the Canadian Hot 100, but did peak at number 72 on the Canadian Digital Song Sales chart.)	—	—	— (Note: "Sway" did not enter the Billboard Hot 100, but did peak at number 6 on the Bubbling Under Hot 100 extension chart.)		Glee: The Music, Volume 4	"Furt"
"Just the Way You Are"	47	24	48	69	40		Glee: The Music, Volume 4	"Furt"
"Valerie"	—	70	—	112	54		Glee: The Music, Volume 4	"Special Education"
"(I've Had) The Time of My Life"	85	39	—	82	38		Glee: The Music, Volume 4	"Special Education"
"Don't Cry for Me Argentina" (Lea Michele version)	—	—	—	—	97		Glee: The Music, The Complete Season Two	"Special Education"
"Don't Cry for Me Argentina" (Chris Colfer version)	—	— (Note: "Don't Cry For Me Argentina" (Chris Colfer version) did not enter the Canadian Hot 100, but did peak at number 69 on the Canadian Digital Song Sales chart.)	—	—	— (Note: "Don't Cry For Me Argentina" (Chris Colfer version) did not enter the Billboard Hot 100, but did peak at number 14 on the Bubbling Under Hot 100 extension chart.)		Glee: The Music, The Complete Season Two	"Special Education"
"The Living Years"	—	—	—	—	— (Note: "The Living Years" did not enter the Billboard Hot 100, but did peak at number 16 on the Bubbling Under Hot 100 extension chart.)		Glee: The Music, The Complete Season Two	"Special Education"
"Dog Days Are Over"	67	22	43	48	22		Glee: The Music, The Complete Season Two	"Special Education"
"Hey, Soul Sister"	81	32	—	37	29		Glee: The Music; Presents the Warblers	"Special Education"
"Last Christmas"	60	46	—	—	63		Glee: The Music, The Christmas Album	"A Very Glee Christmas"
"Welcome Christmas"	—	37	—	—	59		Glee: The Music, The Complete Season Two	"A Very Glee Christmas"
"Bills, Bills, Bills"	71	58	—	58	44		Glee: The Music; Presents the Warblers	"The Sue Sylvester Shuffle"
"Thriller / Heads Will Roll"	17	30	37	23	38		Glee: The Music, Volume 5	"The Sue Sylvester Shuffle"
"Need You Now"	46	51	—	51	62		Glee: The Music, Volume 5	"The Sue Sylvester Shuffle"
"She's Not There"	—	—	—	119	87		Glee: The Music, Volume 5	"The Sue Sylvester Shuffle"
"Fat Bottomed Girls"	93	50	—	66	56		Glee: The Music, Volume 5	"Silly Love Songs"
"P.Y.T. (Pretty Young Thing)"	—	69	—	68	58		Glee: The Music, Volume 5	"Silly Love Songs"
"Firework"	59	35	—	55	34		Glee: The Music, Volume 5	"Silly Love Songs"
"Silly Love Songs"	55	54	—	89	45		Glee: The Music; Presents the Warblers	"Silly Love Songs"
"When I Get You Alone"	100	61	—	79	47		Glee: The Music; Presents the Warblers	"Silly Love Songs"
"I Know What Boys Like"	—	—	—	—	—		Glee: The Music, Dance Party	"Comeback"
"Baby"	90	52	—	67	47		Glee: The Music, Volume 5	"Comeback"
"Somebody to Love"	68	53	—	82	62		Glee: The Music, Volume 5	"Comeback"
"Take Me or Leave Me"	—	60	—	91	51		Glee: The Music, Volume 5	"Comeback"
"Sing"	79	37	—	46	49		Glee: The Music, Volume 5	"Comeback"
"Don't You Want Me"	44	50	—	47	49		Glee: The Music, Volume 5	"Blame It on the Alcohol"
"Tik Tok"	72	56	—	45	61		Glee: The Music, Dance Party	"Blame It on the Alcohol"
"Blame It (On the Alcohol)"	80	61	—	63	55		Glee: The Music, Dance Party	"Blame It on the Alcohol"
"One Bourbon, One Scotch, One Beer"	—	—	—	154	— (Note: "One Bourbon, One Scotch, One Beer" did not enter the Billboard Hot 100, but did peak at number 8 on the Bubbling Under Hot 100 extension chart.)		Glee: The Music, The Complete Season Two	"Blame It on the Alcohol"
"Animal"	88	65	—	96	62		Glee: The Music; Presents the Warblers	"Sexy"
"Do You Wanna Touch Me (Oh Yeah)" (featuring Gwyneth Paltrow)	—	63	—	95	57		Glee: The Music, Volume 5	"Sexy"
"Kiss" (featuring Gwyneth Paltrow)	98	80	—	141	83		Glee: The Music, Volume 5	"Sexy"
"Landslide" (featuring Gwyneth Paltrow)	38	35	36	52	23		Glee: The Music, Volume 5	"Sexy"
"Afternoon Delight" (featuring John Stamos)	—	—	—	—	— (Note: "Afternoon Delight" did not enter the Billboard Hot 100, but did peak at number 8 on the Bubbling Under Hot 100 extension chart.)		Glee: The Music, Volume 5	"Sexy"
"Get It Right"	34	23	38	31	16		Glee: The Music, Volume 5	"Original Song"
"Loser like Me"	15	9	23	27	6	RIAA: Gold	Glee: The Music, Volume 5	"Original Song"
"Misery"	66	56	—	101	52		Glee: The Music; Presents the Warblers	"Original Song"
"Blackbird"	58	48	—	118	37		Glee: The Music; Presents the Warblers	"Original Song"
"Candles"	100	86	—	165	71		Glee: The Music; Presents the Warblers	"Original Song"
"Raise Your Glass"	30	46	—	61	36		Glee: The Music; Presents the Warblers	"Original Song"
"Big Ass Heart"	—	—	—	173	—		Glee: The Music, The Complete Season Two	"Original Song"
"Hell to the No"	—	65	—	77	53		Glee: The Music, The Complete Season Two	"Original Song"
"Trouty Mouth"	—	—	—	—	—		Glee: The Music, The Complete Season Two	"Original Song"
"Ain't No Way"	—	—	—	171	— (Note: "Ain't No Way" did not enter the Billboard Hot 100, but did peak at number 16 on the Bubbling Under Hot 100 extension chart.)		Glee: The Music, The Complete Season Two	"A Night of Neglect"
"All by Myself"	—	— (Note: "All By Myself" did not enter the Canadian Hot 100, but did peak at number 65 on the Canadian Digital Song Sales chart.)	—	98	87		Glee: The Music, The Complete Season Two	"A Night of Neglect"
"I Follow Rivers"	—	—	—	—	—		Glee: The Music, The Complete Season Two	"A Night of Neglect"
"Turning Tables" (featuring Gwyneth Paltrow)	—	66	—	75	66		Glee: The Music, Volume 6	"A Night of Neglect"
"I Feel Pretty / Unpretty"	47	28	37	36	22		Glee: The Music, Volume 6	"Born This Way"
"As If We Never Said Goodbye"	—	— (Note: "As If We Never Said Goodbye" did not enter the Canadian Hot 100, but did peak at number 66 on the Canadian Digital Song Sales chart.)	—	112	80		Glee: The Music, Volume 6	"Born This Way"
"Born This Way"	76	31	—	52	44		Glee: The Music, Volume 6	"Born This Way"
"Somewhere Only We Know"	97	52	47	44	42		Glee: The Music; Presents the Warblers	"Born This Way"
"I've Gotta Be Me"	—	—	—	—	— (Note: "I've Gotta Be Me" did not enter the Billboard Hot 100, but did peak at number 4 on the Bubbling Under Hot 100 extension chart.)		Glee: The Music, The Complete Season Two	"Born This Way"
"Never Going Back Again"	—	80	—	167	81		Glee: The Music, The Complete Season Two	"Rumours"
"I Don't Want to Know"	—	— (Note: "I Don't Want to Know" did not enter the Canadian Hot 100, but did peak at number 65 on the Canadian Digital Song Sales chart.)	—	156	— (Note: "I Don't Want to Know" did not enter the Billboard Hot 100, but did peak at number 1 on the Bubbling Under Hot 100 extension chart.)		Glee: The Music, The Complete Season Two	"Rumours"
"Dreams" (featuring Kristin Chenoweth)	—	— (Note: "Dreams" did not enter the Canadian Hot 100, but did peak at number 69 on the Canadian Digital Song Sales chart.)	—	133	92		Glee: The Music, Volume 6	"Rumours"
"Songbird"	—	70	—	54	68		Glee: The Music, Volume 6	"Rumours"
"Go Your Own Way"	30	31	40	51	45		Glee: The Music, Volume 6	"Rumours"
"Don't Stop"	—	65	—	104	79		Glee: The Music, Volume 6	"Rumours"
"Rolling in the Deep" (featuring Jonathan Groff)	55	31	47	49	29		Glee: The Music, Volume 6	"Prom Queen"
"Isn't She Lovely"	58	83	—	111	65		Glee: The Music, Volume 6	"Prom Queen"
"Dancing Queen"	—	89	—	169	74		Glee: The Music, Volume 6	"Prom Queen"
"I'm Not Gonna Teach Your Boyfriend How to Dance with You"	—	87	—	100	72		Glee: The Music, Dance Party	"Prom Queen"
"Friday"	62	33	46	46	34		Glee: The Music, The Complete Season Two	"Prom Queen"
"Jar of Hearts"	99	39	—	63	49		Glee: The Music, The Complete Season Two	"Prom Queen"
"Back to Black"	—	—	—	103	82		Glee: The Music, The Complete Season Two	"Funeral"
"Some People"	—	—	—	—	—		Glee: The Music, The Complete Season Two	"Funeral"
"Try a Little Tenderness"	—	—	—	—	— (Note: "Try a Little Tenderness" did not enter the Billboard Hot 100, but did peak at number 8 on the Bubbling Under Hot 100 extension chart.)		Glee: The Music, Volume 6	"Funeral"
"My Man"	—	—	—	—	94		Glee: The Music, Volume 6	"Funeral"
"Pure Imagination"	92	87	—	97	59		Glee: The Music, Volume 6	"Funeral"
"Bella Notte"	—	—	—	—	— (Note: "Bella Notte" did not enter the Billboard Hot 100, but did peak at number 17 on the Bubbling Under Hot 100 extension chart.)		Glee: The Music, Volume 6	"New York"
"As Long as You're There"	—	—	—	128	93		Glee: The Music, Volume 6	"New York"
"Pretending"	—	40	—	63	40		Glee: The Music, Volume 6	"New York"
"Light Up the World"	78	26	46	48	33		Glee: The Music, Volume 6	"New York"
"My Cup"	—	—	—	—	— (Note: "My Cup" did not enter the Billboard Hot 100, but did peak at number 13 on the Bubbling Under Hot 100 extension chart.)		Glee: The Music, The Complete Season Two	"New York"
"I Love New York / New York, New York"	—	81	—	83	81		Glee: The Music, The Complete Season Two	"New York"
"For Good"	—	79	—	65	58		Glee: The Music, The Complete Season Two	"New York"
"Yeah!"	—	—	—	168	— (Note: "Yeah!" did not enter the Billboard Hot 100, but did peak at number 9 on the Bubbling Under Hot 100 extension chart.)		Glee: The Music, Dance Party	"New York"
"—" denotes a release that did not chart.

=== Season 3: 2011–2012 ===
List of singles, with selected chart positions, showing album name and episode name
Title	Peak chart positions					Certifications	Album	Episode
Title	AUS	CAN	IRL	UK	US	Certifications	Album	Episode
"We Got the Beat"	—	83	—	129	83		Glee: The Music, The Complete Season Three	"The Purple Piano Project"
"Ding-Dong! The Witch Is Dead"	—	—	—	177	— (Note: "Ding-Dong! The Witch Is Dead" did not enter the Billboard Hot 100, but did peak at number 2 on the Bubbling Under Hot 100 extension chart.)		Glee: The Music, The Complete Season Three	"The Purple Piano Project"
"Anything Goes / Anything You Can Do"	—	—	—	185	— (Note: "Anything Goes / Anything You Can Do" did not enter the Billboard Hot 100, but did peak at number 3 on the Bubbling Under Hot 100 extension chart.)		Glee: The Music, The Complete Season Three	"The Purple Piano Project"
"It's Not Unusual"	—	75	—	99	65		Glee: The Music, Volume 7	"The Purple Piano Project"
"You Can't Stop the Beat"	90	65	—	70	67		Glee: The Music, Volume 7	"The Purple Piano Project"
"Somewhere" (featuring Idina Menzel)	—	—	—	110	75		Glee: The Music, Volume 7	"I Am Unicorn"
"Something's Coming"	—	—	—	—	— (Note: "Something's Coming" did not enter the Billboard Hot 100, but did peak at number 5 on the Bubbling Under Hot 100 extension chart.)		Glee: The Music, The Complete Season Three	"I Am Unicorn"
"I'm the Greatest Star"	—	—	—	—	—		Glee: The Music, The Complete Season Three	"I Am Unicorn"
"Spotlight"	—	—	—	172	— (Note: "Spotlight" did not enter the Billboard Hot 100, but did peak at number 7 on the Bubbling Under Hot 100 extension chart.)		Glee: The Music, The Complete Season Three	"Asian F"
"Cool"	—	—	—	—	—		Glee: The Music, The Complete Season Three	"Asian F"
"It's All Over"	—	—	—	—	— (Note: "It's All Over" did not enter the Billboard Hot 100, but did peak at number 21 on the Bubbling Under Hot 100 extension chart.)		Glee: The Music, The Complete Season Three	"Asian F"
"Out Here on My Own"	—	—	—	165	— (Note: "Out Here On My Own" did not enter the Billboard Hot 100, but did peak at number 3 on the Bubbling Under Hot 100 extension chart.)		Glee: The Music, The Complete Season Three	"Asian F"
"Run the World (Girls)"	91	—	—	130	91		Glee: The Music, Volume 7	"Asian F"
"Fix You"	99	76	—	103	53		Glee: The Music, Volume 7	"Asian F"
"Last Friday Night (T.G.I.F.)"	86	86	—	107	72		Glee: The Music, Volume 7	"Pot o' Gold"
"Bein' Green"	—	—	—	—	—		Glee: The Music, The Complete Season Three	"Pot o' Gold"
"Waiting for a Girl Like You"	—	—	—	—	— (Note: "Waiting for a Girl Like You" did not enter the Billboard Hot 100, but did peak at number 11 on the Bubbling Under Hot 100 extension chart.)		Glee: The Music, The Complete Season Three	"Pot o' Gold"
"Candyman"	—	—	—	158	— (Note: "Candyman" did not enter the Billboard Hot 100, but did peak at number 18 on the Bubbling Under Hot 100 extension chart.)		Glee: The Music, The Complete Season Three	"Pot o' Gold"
"Take Care of Yourself"	—	—	—	—	— (Note: "Take Care of Yourself" did not enter the Billboard Hot 100, but did peak at number 7 on the Bubbling Under Hot 100 extension chart.)		Glee: The Music, The Complete Season Three	"Pot o' Gold"
"A Boy Like That"^{[g]}	—	—	—	—	— (Note: "A Boy Like That" did not enter the Billboard Hot 100, but did peak at number 20 on the Bubbling Under Hot 100 extension chart.)		Glee: The Music, The Complete Season Three	"The First Time"
"America"	—	—	—	191	— (Note: "America" did not enter the Billboard Hot 100, but did peak at number 1 on the Bubbling Under Hot 100 extension chart.)		Glee: The Music, The Complete Season Three	"The First Time"
"One Hand, One Heart"	—	—	—	—	— (Note: "One Hand, One Heart" did not enter the Billboard Hot 100, but did peak at number 15 on the Bubbling Under Hot 100 extension chart.)		Glee: The Music, The Complete Season Three	"The First Time"
"Tonight"	—	—	—	—	— (Note: "Tonight" did not enter the Billboard Hot 100, but did peak at number 2 on the Bubbling Under Hot 100 extension chart.)		Glee: The Music, Volume 7	"The First Time"
"Uptown Girl"	—	93	—	140	68		Glee: The Music, Volume 7	"The First Time"
"Hot for Teacher"	—	—	—	—	—		Glee: The Music, Volume 7	"Mash Off"
"Rumour Has It / Someone Like You"	28	12	19	35	11		Glee: The Music, Volume 7	"Mash Off"
"You and I / You and I" (featuring Idina Menzel)	—	93	—	174	69		Glee: The Music, The Complete Season Three	"Mash Off"
"Hit Me with Your Best Shot / One Way or Another"	90	95	—	134	86		Glee: The Music, The Complete Season Three	"Mash Off"
"I Can't Go for That / You Make My Dreams"	—	74	—	178	80		Glee: The Music, The Complete Season Three	"Mash Off"
"Perfect"	—	71	—	113	57		Glee: The Music, The Complete Season Three	"I Kissed a Girl"
"I'm the Only One"	—	— (Note: "I'm the Only One" did not enter the Canadian Hot 100, but did peak at number 75 on the Canadian Digital Song Sales chart.)	—	—	86		Glee: The Music, The Complete Season Three	"I Kissed a Girl"
"Jolene"	—	—	—	—	— (Note: "Jolene" did not enter the Billboard Hot 100, but did peak at number 16 on the Bubbling Under Hot 100 extension chart.)		Glee: The Music, The Complete Season Three	"I Kissed a Girl"
"I Kissed a Girl"	—	87	—	149	66		Glee: The Music, The Complete Season Three	"I Kissed a Girl"
"Girls Just Want to Have Fun"	—	75	—	—	59		Glee: The Music, Volume 7	"I Kissed a Girl"
"Constant Craving" (featuring Idina Menzel)	—	—	—	—	89		Glee: The Music, Volume 7	"I Kissed a Girl"
"We Are Young"	49	11	32	56	12		Glee: The Music, The Graduation Album	"Hold On to Sixteen"
"Red Solo Cup"	—	99	—	—	92		Glee: The Music, The Complete Season Three	"Hold On to Sixteen"
"Buenos Aires"	—	—	—	—	—		Glee: The Music, The Complete Season Three	"Hold On to Sixteen"
"Survivor / I Will Survive"	78	47	—	97	51		Glee: The Music, The Complete Season Three	"Hold On to Sixteen"
"My Favorite Things"	—	— (Note: "My Favorite Things" did not enter the Canadian Hot 100, but did peak at number 74 on the Canadian Digital Song Sales chart.)	—	—	—		Glee: The Music, The Complete Season Three	"Extraordinary Merry Christmas"
"All I Want for Christmas Is You"	—	98	—	—	— (Note: "All I Want for Christmas Is You" did not enter the Billboard Hot 100, but did peak at number 18 on the Bubbling Under Hot 100 extension chart.)		Glee: The Music, The Christmas Album; Volume 2	"Extraordinary Merry Christmas"
"Blue Christmas"	—	—	—	—	—		Glee: The Music, The Christmas Album; Volume 2	"Extraordinary Merry Christmas"
"River"	—	—	—	—	—		Glee: The Music, The Christmas Album; Volume 2	"Extraordinary Merry Christmas"
"Extraordinary Merry Christmas"	—	—	—	—	— (Note: "Extraordinary Merry Christmas" did not enter the Billboard Hot 100, but did peak at number 22 on the Bubbling Under Hot 100 extension chart.)		Glee: The Music, The Christmas Album; Volume 2	"Extraordinary Merry Christmas"
"Let It Snow"	—	—	—	—	—		Glee: The Music, The Christmas Album; Volume 2	"Extraordinary Merry Christmas"
"Santa Claus Is Coming to Town"	—	—	—	—	—		Glee: The Music, The Christmas Album; Volume 2	"Extraordinary Merry Christmas"
"Christmas Wrapping"	—	—	—	—	—		Glee: The Music, The Christmas Album; Volume 2	"Extraordinary Merry Christmas"
"Do They Know It's Christmas?"	—	85	—	—	92		Glee: The Music, The Christmas Album; Volume 2	"Extraordinary Merry Christmas"
"Summer Nights"	—	85	—	—	88		Glee: The Music, The Complete Season Three	"Yes/No"
"Wedding Bell Blues"	—	—	—	—	— (Note: "Wedding Bell Blues" did not enter the Billboard Hot 100, but did peak at number 17 on the Bubbling Under Hot 100 extension chart.)		Glee: The Music, The Complete Season Three	"Yes/No"
"Moves Like Jagger / Jumpin' Jack Flash"	—	59	—	169	62		Glee: The Music, The Complete Season Three	"Yes/No"
"The First Time Ever I Saw Your Face"	—	78	—	—	70		Glee: The Music, The Complete Season Three	"Yes/No"
"Without You"	62	29	88	94	28		Glee: The Music, The Complete Season Three	"Yes/No"
"We Found Love"	79	55	—	151	56		Glee: The Music, The Complete Season Three	"Yes/No"
"Wanna Be Startin' Somethin'"	—	88	—	—	78		Glee: The Music, The Complete Season Three	"Michael"
"Bad"	—	90	—	193	80		Glee: The Music, The Complete Season Three	"Michael"
"Scream"	—	—	—	—	— (Note: "Scream" did not enter the Billboard Hot 100, but did peak at number 6 on the Bubbling Under Hot 100 extension chart.)		Glee: The Music, The Complete Season Three	"Michael"
"Never Can Say Goodbye"	—	—	—	—	— (Note: "Never Can Say Goodbye" did not enter the Billboard Hot 100, but did peak at number 7 on the Bubbling Under Hot 100 extension chart.)		Glee: The Music, The Complete Season Three	"Michael"
"Human Nature"	—	62	—	173	56		Glee: The Music, The Complete Season Three	"Michael"
"Ben"	—	—	—	—	— (Note: "Ben" did not enter the Billboard Hot 100, but did peak at number 12 on the Bubbling Under Hot 100 extension chart.)		Glee: The Music, The Complete Season Three	"Michael"
"Smooth Criminal" with Grant Gustin (featuring 2Cellos)	59	28	46	86	26		Glee: The Music, The Complete Season Three	"Michael"
"I Just Can't Stop Loving You"	—	—	—	—	— (Note: "I Just Can't Stop Loving You" did not enter the Billboard Hot 100, but did peak at number 1 on the Bubbling Under Hot 100 extension chart.)		Glee: The Music, The Complete Season Three	"Michael"
"Black or White"	—	69	—	182	64		Glee: The Music, The Complete Season Three	"Michael"
"Sexy and I Know It" (featuring Ricky Martin)	—	—	—	—	81		Glee: The Music, The Complete Season Three	"The Spanish Teacher"
"Don't Wanna Lose You"	—	—	—	—	—		Glee: The Music, The Complete Season Three	"The Spanish Teacher"
"Bamboleo / Hero"	—	—	—	—	—		Glee: The Music, The Complete Season Three	"The Spanish Teacher"
"La Isla Bonita" (featuring Ricky Martin)	—	93	—	152	99		Glee: The Music, The Complete Season Three	"The Spanish Teacher"
"A Little Less Conversation"	—	—	—	—	—		Glee: The Music, The Complete Season Three	"The Spanish Teacher"
"L-O-V-E"	—	—	—	—	—		Glee: The Music, The Complete Season Three	"Heart"
"Let Me Love You"	—	—	—	—	— (Note: "Let Me Love You" did not enter the Billboard Hot 100, but did peak at number 9 on the Bubbling Under Hot 100 extension chart.)		Glee: The Music, The Complete Season Three	"Heart"
"Stereo Hearts"	80	74	87	162	92		Glee: The Music, The Complete Season Three	"Heart"
"Home"	—	—	—	—	— (Note: "Home" did not enter the Billboard Hot 100, but did peak at number 10 on the Bubbling Under Hot 100 extension chart.)		Glee: The Music, The Complete Season Three	"Heart"
"I Will Always Love You"	—	90	—	—	87		Glee: The Music, The Complete Season Three	"Heart"
"You're the Top"	—	—	—	—	—		Glee: The Music, The Complete Season Three	"Heart"
"Cherish / Cherish"	—	—	—	—	—		Glee: The Music, The Complete Season Three	"Heart"
"Love Shack"	—	—	—	—	— (Note: "Love Shack" did not enter the Billboard Hot 100, but did peak at number 5 on the Bubbling Under Hot 100 extension chart.)		Glee: The Music, The Complete Season Three	"Heart"
"Cough Syrup"	—	67	66	150	65		Glee: The Music, The Complete Season Three	"On My Way"
"Stand"	—	—	—	—	—		Glee: The Music, The Complete Season Three	"On My Way"
"Glad You Came"	—	74	—	—	90		Glee: The Music, The Complete Season Three	"On My Way"
"Fly / I Believe I Can Fly"	87	59	70	121	56		Glee: The Music, The Complete Season Three	"On My Way"
"What Doesn't Kill You (Stronger)"	68	51	71	128	66		Glee: The Music, The Complete Season Three	"On My Way"
"Here's to Us"	91	64	60	122	73		Glee: The Music, The Complete Season Three	"On My Way"
"I'm Still Standing"	—	—	—	—	—		Glee: The Music, The Complete Season Three	"Big Brother"
"Hungry Like the Wolf / Rio" (featuring Matt Bomer)	—	81	—	169	98		Glee: The Music, The Complete Season Three	"Big Brother"
"Fighter"	—	85	—	142	— (Note: "Fighter" did not enter the Billboard Hot 100, but did peak at number 2 on the Bubbling Under Hot 100 extension chart.)		Glee: The Music, The Complete Season Three	"Big Brother"
"Up Up Up"	—	—	—	—	—		Glee: The Music, The Complete Season Three	"Big Brother"
"Somebody That I Used to Know" (featuring Matt Bomer)	67	21	25	48	26		Glee: The Music, The Complete Season Three	"Big Brother"
"You Should Be Dancing"	—	—	—	—	—		Glee: The Music, The Complete Season Three	"Saturday Night Glee-ver"
"Night Fever"	—	—	—	—	—		Glee: The Music, The Complete Season Three	"Saturday Night Glee-ver"
"Disco Inferno"	—	—	—	—	—		Glee: The Music, The Complete Season Three	"Saturday Night Glee-ver"
"If I Can't Have You"	—	—	—	—	—		Glee: The Music, The Complete Season Three	"Saturday Night Glee-ver"
"How Deep Is Your Love"	—	—	—	—	—		Glee: The Music, The Complete Season Three	"Saturday Night Glee-ver"
"Boogie Shoes"	—	—	—	—	—		Glee: The Music, The Complete Season Three	"Saturday Night Glee-ver"
"More Than a Woman"	—	—	—	—	—		Glee: The Music, The Complete Season Three	"Saturday Night Glee-ver"
"Stayin' Alive"	—	—	—	—	—		Glee: The Music, The Complete Season Three	"Saturday Night Glee-ver"
"How Will I Know"	92	61	56	73	65		Glee: The Music, The Complete Season Three	"Dance with Somebody"
"I Wanna Dance with Somebody (Who Loves Me)"	—	80	92	113	— (Note: "I Wanna Dance with Somebody (Who Loves Me)" did not enter the Billboard Hot 100, but did peak at number 1 on the Bubbling Under Hot 100 extension chart.)		Glee: The Music, The Complete Season Three	"Dance with Somebody"
"Saving All My Love for You"	—	—	—	—	—		Glee: The Music, The Complete Season Three	"Dance with Somebody"
"So Emotional"	—	—	—	166	— (Note: "So Emotional" did not enter the Billboard Hot 100, but did peak at number 25 on the Bubbling Under Hot 100 extension chart.)		Glee: The Music, The Complete Season Three	"Dance with Somebody"
"It's Not Right but It's Okay"	—	75	—	130	92		Glee: The Music, The Complete Season Three	"Dance with Somebody"
"I Have Nothing"	—	—	—	193	—		Glee: The Music, The Complete Season Three	"Dance with Somebody"
"My Love Is Your Love"	—	—	—	154	— (Note: "My Love Is Your Love" did not enter the Billboard Hot 100, but did peak at number 9 on the Bubbling Under Hot 100 extension chart.)		Glee: The Music, The Complete Season Three	"Dance with Somebody"
"Cell Block Tango"	—	—	—	175	—		Glee: The Music, The Complete Season Three	"Choke"
"Cry"	—	90	100	116	— (Note: "Cry" did not enter the Billboard Hot 100, but did peak at number 5 on the Bubbling Under Hot 100 extension chart.)		Glee: The Music, The Complete Season Three	"Choke"
"Not the Boy Next Door"	—	—	—	—	—		Glee: The Music, The Complete Season Three	"Choke"
"Shake It Out"	73	60	29	54	71		Glee: The Music, The Complete Season Three	"Choke"
"The Rain in Spain"	—	—	—	—	—		Glee: The Music, The Complete Season Three	"Choke"
"School's Out"	—	—	—	—	—		Glee: The Music, The Graduation Album	"Choke"
"Big Girls Don't Cry"	—	—	—	132	—		Glee: The Music, The Complete Season Three	"Prom-asaurus"
"Dinosaur"	—	—	—	—	—		Glee: The Music, The Complete Season Three	"Prom-asaurus"
"Love You Like a Love Song"	—	—	—	180	—		Glee: The Music, The Complete Season Three	"Prom-asaurus"
"Take My Breath Away"	—	—	—	—	—		Glee: The Music, The Complete Season Three	"Prom-asaurus"
"What Makes You Beautiful"	—	93	—	162	— (Note: "What Makes You Beautiful" did not enter the Billboard Hot 100, but did peak at number 11 on the Bubbling Under Hot 100 extension chart.)		Glee: The Music, The Complete Season Three	"Prom-asaurus"
"Because You Loved Me"	—	—	—	—	—		Glee: The Music, The Complete Season Three	"Props"
"Mean"	—	71	80	115	— (Note: "Mean" did not enter the Billboard Hot 100, but did peak at number 5 on the Bubbling Under Hot 100 extension chart.)		Glee: The Music, The Complete Season Three	"Props"
"Flashdance... What a Feeling"	—	—	—	145	—		Glee: The Music, The Complete Season Three	"Props"
"I Won't Give Up"	—	—	—	172	—		Glee: The Music, The Graduation Album	"Props"
"Edge of Glory"	—	—	—	141	—		Glee: The Music, The Graduation Album	"Nationals"
"We Are the Champions"	—	—	—	198	—		Glee: The Music, The Graduation Album	"Nationals"
"It's All Coming Back to Me Now"	—	75	63	69	— (Note: "It's All Coming Back to Me Now" did not enter the Billboard Hot 100, but did peak at number 1 on the Bubbling Under Hot 100 extension chart.)		Glee: The Music, The Complete Season Three	"Nationals"
"Paradise by the Dashboard Light"	—	94	—	95	— (Note: "Paradise by the Dashboard Light" did not enter the Billboard Hot 100, but did peak at number 15 on the Bubbling Under Hot 100 extension chart.)		Glee: The Music, The Complete Season Three	"Nationals"
"Starships"	—	—	—	175	—		Glee: The Music, The Complete Season Three	"Nationals"
"Pinball Wizard"	—	—	—	—	—		Glee: The Music, The Complete Season Three	"Nationals"
"Tongue Tied"	—	—	—	—	—		Glee: The Music, The Complete Season Three	"Nationals"
"In My Life"	—	—	—	—	—		Glee: The Music, The Complete Season Three	"Goodbye"
"—" denotes a release that did not, or has yet to chart.

=== Season 4: 2012–2013 ===
List of singles, with selected chart positions, showing album name and episode name
Title	Peak chart positions				Certifications	Album	Episode
Title	CAN	IRL	UK	US	Certifications	Album	Episode
"It's Time"	87	—	170	95		Glee: The Music, Season 4, Volume 1	"The New Rachel"
"New York State of Mind"	—	—	—	— (Note: "New York State of Mind" did not enter the Billboard Hot 100, but did peak at number 24 on the Bubbling Under Hot 100 extension chart.)		Glee: The Music, Season 4, Volume 1	"The New Rachel"
"Call Me Maybe"	—	—	—	—		Non-album singles	"The New Rachel"
"Americano / Dance Again" (featuring Kate Hudson)	—	—	—	— (Note: "Americano / Dance Again" did not enter the Billboard Hot 100, but did peak at number 14 on the Bubbling Under Hot 100 extension chart.)		Non-album singles	"The New Rachel"
"Never Say Never"	—	—	—	—		Non-album singles	"The New Rachel"
"Chasing Pavements"	—	—	—	—		Non-album singles	"The New Rachel"
"Everybody Wants to Rule the World"	—	—	—	—		Non-album singles	"Makeover"
"Celebrity Skin"	—	—	—	—		Non-album singles	"Makeover"
"The Way You Look Tonight / You're Never Fully Dressed Without a Smile" (featuring Sarah Jessica Parker)	—	—	—	—		Non-album singles	"Makeover"
"A Change Would Do You Good"	—	—	—	—		Non-album singles	"Makeover"
"Barely Breathing"	—	—	—	— (Note: "Barely Breathing" did not enter the Billboard Hot 100, but did peak at number 75 on the Digital Song Sales component chart.)		Non-album singles	"The Break Up"
"Teenage Dream" (acoustic version)	—	—	—	—		Non-album singles	"The Break Up"
"Don't Speak"	—	—	164	— (Note: "Don't Speak" did not enter the Billboard Hot 100, but did peak at number 23 on the Bubbling Under Hot 100 extension chart.)		Non-album singles	"The Break Up"
"Give Your Heart a Break"	94	—	144	— (Note: "Give Your Heart a Break" did not enter the Billboard Hot 100, but did peak at number 2 on the Bubbling Under Hot 100 extension chart.)		Glee: The Music, Season 4, Volume 1	"The Break Up"
"Mine"	— (Note: "Mine" did not enter the Canadian Hot 100, but did peak at number 75 on the Canadian Digital Song Sales extension chart.)	—	95	— (Note: "Mine" did not enter the Billboard Hot 100, but did peak at number 15 on the Bubbling Under Hot 100 extension chart.)		Glee: The Music, Season 4, Volume 1	"The Break Up"
"The Scientist"	72	—	102	91		Glee: The Music, Season 4, Volume 1	"The Break Up"
"Everybody Talks"	—	—	152	—	ARIA: Platinum	Glee: The Music, Season 4, Volume 1	"The Role You Were Born to Play"
"Blow Me (One Last Kiss)"	—	—	—	—		Non-album singles	"The Role You Were Born to Play"
"Juke Box Hero"	—	—	—	—		Non-album singles	"The Role You Were Born to Play"
"Superman"	—	—	—	—		Non-album singles	"Dynamic Duets"
"My Dark Side"	—	—	—	—		Glee: The Music, Season 4, Volume 1	"Dynamic Duets"
"Holding Out for a Hero"	—	—	—	—		Glee: The Music, Season 4, Volume 1	"Dynamic Duets"
"Heroes"	—	—	—	—		Glee: The Music, Season 4, Volume 1	"Dynamic Duets"
"Some Nights"	97	—	168	—		Glee: The Music, Season 4, Volume 1	"Dynamic Duets"
"Come See About Me"	—	—	—	—		Non-album singles	"Thanksgiving"
"Whistle"	—	—	—	—		Non-album singles	"Thanksgiving"
"Let's Have a Kiki / Turkey Lurkey Time"	—	—	—	—		Non-album singles	"Thanksgiving"
"Somethin' Stupid"	—	—	—	—		Glee: The Music, Season 4, Volume 1	"Swan Song"
"All That Jazz"	—	—	—	—		Non-album singles	"Swan Song"
"Being Good Isn't Good Enough"	—	—	—	—		Non-album singles	"Swan Song"
"Being Alive"	—	—	—	—		Non-album singles	"Swan Song"
"Don't Dream It's Over"	—	—	—	—		Non-album singles	"Swan Song"
"I Don't Know How to Love Him"	—	—	—	—		Non-album singles	"Sadie Hawkins"
"Baby Got Back"	—	—	—	—		Non-album singles	"Sadie Hawkins"
"Tell Him"	—	—	—	—		Non-album singles	"Sadie Hawkins"
"No Scrubs"	—	—	—	—		Non-album singles	"Sadie Hawkins"
"Locked Out of Heaven"	—	—	—	—		Non-album singles	"Sadie Hawkins"
"I Only Have Eyes for You"	—	—	—	—		Non-album singles	"Sadie Hawkins"
"Torn"	—	—	—	—		Non-album singles	"Naked"
"Centerfold / Hot in Herre"	—	—	—	—		Non-album singles	"Naked"
"A Thousand Years"	93	—	—	— (Note: "A Thousand Years" did not enter the Billboard Hot 100, but did peak at number 14 on the Bubbling Under Hot 100 extension chart.)		Non-album singles	"Naked"
"Let Me Love You (Until You Learn to Love Yourself)"	68	83	77	91		Non-album singles	"Naked"
"Love Song"	—	—	—	—		Non-album singles	"Naked"
"This Is the New Year"	—	—	—	— (Note: "This Is the New Year" did not enter the Billboard Hot 100, but did peak at number 68 on the Digital Song Sales component chart.)		Non-album singles	"Naked"
"Diva"	—	—	—	—		Non-album singles	"Diva"
"Don't Stop Me Now"	—	—	—	—		Non-album singles	"Diva"
"Nutbush City Limits"	—	—	—	—		Non-album singles	"Diva"
"Make No Mistake, She's Mine"	—	—	—	—		Non-album singles	"Diva"
"Bring Him Home"	—	—	—	—		Non-album singles	"Diva"
"Hung Up"	—	—	—	—		Non-album singles	"Diva"
"Girl on Fire"	—	—	—	—		Non-album singles	"Diva"
"You're All I Need to Get By"	—	—	—	—		Non-album singles	"I Do"
"Getting Married Today"	—	—	—	—		Non-album singles	"I Do"
"Just Can't Get Enough"	—	—	—	—		Non-album singles	"I Do"
"We've Got Tonight"	—	—	—	—		Non-album singles	"I Do"
"Anything Could Happen"	—	—	—	—		Non-album singles	"Girls (and Boys) On Film"
"Come What May"	—	—	—	—		Non-album singles	"Girls (and Boys) On Film"
"Sparkling Diamonds"	—	—	—	—		Non-album singles	"Girls (and Boys) On Film"
"Footloose"	—	—	—	—		Non-album singles	"Girls (and Boys) On Film"
"You're All the World to Me"	—	—	—	—		Non-album singles	"Girls (and Boys) On Film"
"Shout"	—	—	—	—		Non-album singles	"Girls (and Boys) On Film"
"In Your Eyes"	—	—	—	—		Non-album singles	"Girls (and Boys) On Film"
"Old Time Rock and Roll / Danger Zone"	—	—	—	—		Non-album singles	"Girls (and Boys) On Film"
"Unchained Melody"	—	—	—	—		Non-album singles	"Feud"
"How to Be a Heartbreaker"	—	—	—	—		Non-album singles	"Feud"
"The Bitch Is Back / Dress You Up"	—	—	—	—		Non-album singles	"Feud"
"Cold Hearted"	—	—	—	—		Non-album singles	"Feud"
"Bye Bye Bye / I Want It That Way"	—	—	—	—		Non-album singles	"Feud"
"I Still Believe / Super Bass"	—	—	—	—		Non-album singles	"Feud"
"Closer"	—	—	—	—		Non-album singles	"Guilty Pleasures"
"Wake Me Up Before You Go-Go"	—	—	—	—		Non-album singles	"Guilty Pleasures"
"Copacabana"	—	—	—	—		Non-album singles	"Guilty Pleasures"
"Against All Odds (Take a Look at Me Now)"	—	—	—	—		Non-album singles	"Guilty Pleasures"
"Wannabe"	—	—	—	—		Non-album singles	"Guilty Pleasures"
"My Prerogative"	—	—	—	—		Non-album singles	"Guilty Pleasures"
"Creep"	—	—	—	—		Non-album singles	"Guilty Pleasures"
"Mamma Mia"	—	—	—	—		Non-album singles	"Guilty Pleasures"
"—" denotes a release that did not chart.

=== Season 5: 2013–2014 ===
List of singles, with selected chart positions, showing album name and episode name
Title	Album	Episode
"You Are Woman, I Am Man"	Non-album singles	"The End of Twerk"
"Blurred Lines"	Non-album singles	"The End of Twerk"
"If I Were a Boy"	Non-album singles	"The End of Twerk"
"Wrecking Ball"	Non-album singles	"The End of Twerk"
"On Our Way"	Non-album singles	"The End of Twerk"
"Into the Groove"	Non-album singles	"Puppet Master"
"You're My Best Friend"	Non-album singles	"Puppet Master"
"Nasty"/"Rhythm Nation"	Non-album singles	"Puppet Master"
"Cheek to Cheek"	Non-album singles	"Puppet Master"
"The Fox (What Does the Fox Say?)"	Non-album singles	"Puppet Master"
"Whenever I Call You Friend"	Non-album singles	"Frenemies"
"Brave"	Non-album singles	"Frenemies"
"My Lovin' (You're Never Gonna Get It)"	Non-album singles	"Frenemies"
"Don't Rain on My Parade"	Non-album singles	"Frenemies"
"I Believe in a Thing Called Love"	Non-album singles	"Frenemies"
"Every Breath You Take"	Non-album singles	"Frenemies"
"Breakaway"	Non-album singles	"Frenemies"
"Jumpin', Jumpin'"	Non-album singles	"Trio"
"Barracuda"	Non-album singles	"Trio"
"Don't You (Forget About Me)"	Non-album singles	"Trio"
"Danny's Song"	Non-album singles	"Trio"
"Gloria"	Non-album singles	"Trio"
"The Happening"	Non-album singles	"Trio"
"Hold On"	Non-album singles	"Trio"

=== Non-episode singles ===
List of singles, with selected chart positions, showing year released and album name
Title	Year	Album
"Santa Baby"	2011	Glee: The Music, The Christmas Album; Volume 2
"I Want You Back"	2012	Glee: The Music, The Complete Season Three

== Other charted songs ==
A number of songs that were not specifically released as singles, but could still be individually downloaded from their albums/EPs, received enough individual downloads to appear on the singles charts.

List of songs, with selected chart positions, showing year charted, album name, and episode name
Title	Year	Peak chart positions					Album	Episode
Title	Year	AUS	CAN	IRL	UK	US	Album	Episode
"I Say a Little Prayer"	2009	—	—	—	125	—	Glee: The Music, Volume 1	"Showmance"
"Faithfully"	2010	—	49	45	48	37	Glee: The Music, Journey to Regionals	"Journey to Regionals"
"Any Way You Want It / Lovin' Touchin' Squeezin'"	2010	79	39	20	32	58	Glee: The Music, Journey to Regionals	"Journey to Regionals"
"Bohemian Rhapsody" (featuring Jonathan Groff)	2010	—	68	—	67	84	Glee: The Music, Journey to Regionals	"Journey to Regionals"
"To Sir With Love"	2010	61	62	—	60	76	Glee: The Music, Journey to Regionals	"Journey to Regionals"
"Over the Rainbow"	2010	42	31	31	30	43	Glee: The Music, Journey to Regionals	"Journey to Regionals"
"Touch a Touch a Touch a Touch Me"	2010	—	96	—	72	—	Glee: The Music, The Rocky Horror; Glee Show	"The Rocky Horror Glee Show"
"Time Warp"	2010	70	52	42	63	89	Glee: The Music, The Rocky Horror; Glee Show	"The Rocky Horror Glee Show"
"Sweet Transvestite"	2010	—	—	—	186	—	Glee: The Music, The Rocky Horror; Glee Show	"The Rocky Horror Glee Show"
"Baby, It's Cold Outside"	2010	—	53	—	—	57	Glee: The Music, The Christmas Album	"A Very Glee Christmas"
"Jingle Bells"	2010	—	74	—	—	—	Glee: The Music, The Christmas Album	Non-episode songs
"Deck the Rooftop"	2010	—	86	—	—	—	Glee: The Music, The Christmas Album	Non-episode songs
"ABC"	2011	—	93	—	—	88	Glee: The Music, Volume 7	"Hold On to Sixteen"
"Man in the Mirror"	2011	—	84	—	—	76	Glee: The Music, Volume 7	"Hold On to Sixteen"
"White Christmas"	2012	—	—	—	98	—	Glee: The Music, The Christmas Album; Volume 3	"Glee, Actually"
"If I Die Young"	2013	—	—	56	88	—	The Quarterback (Music From the TV Series)	"The Quarterback"
"Make You Feel My Love"	2013	—	66	71	126	84	The Quarterback (Music From the TV Series)	"The Quarterback"
"—" denotes a release that did not chart.
