= Bill Anderson Sings for "All the Lonely Women in the World" =

Studio album by Bill Anderson
- Released: May 1972
- Recorded: November 1971
- Studios: Bradley's Barn, Mt. Juliet, Tennessee
- Genres: Country; Nashville Sound
- Label: Decca
- Producer: Owen Bradley

Bill Anderson chronology
Singing His Praise (1972)	Bill Anderson Sings for "All the Lonely Women in the World" (1972)	Don't She Look Good (1972)

Singles from Bill Anderson Sings for "All the Lonely Women in the World"
- 1. "All the Lonely Women in the World" Released: February 1972

Bill Anderson Sings for "All the Lonely Women in the World" is a studio album by American country singer-songwriter Bill Anderson. It was released in May 1972 on Decca Records and was produced by Owen Bradley. It was Anderson's nineteenth studio recording to be released during his music career. The album included one song that became a major hit for him in 1972, the title track. The album would also reach positions on national music charts at the time.

== Background and content ==
All the Lonely Women in the World was recorded in November 1971 at Bradley's Barn, a studio owned by the album's producer, Owen Bradley. It would be Anderson's nineteenth studio album to be recorded, all of which were done with the Decca label. The album consisted of 11 tracks. Four songs on the record were composed by Anderson, including the title track. Some of the album's additional track were cover versions of songs recorded by other music artists. The second track, "The Morning After Baby Let Me Down", was made a hit by its writer Ray Griff. The sixth track, "Oh Lonesome Me", was first recorded by its writer as well, Don Gibson. Also included are covers of "May You Never Be Alone" by Hank Williams and "Lonely Weekends" by Charlie Rich.

== Release and reception ==
All the Lonely Women in the World was released in May 1972 on Decca Records. The album was issued as a vinyl LP, with six songs on side one and five songs on side two of the record. The album peaked at number 14 on the Billboard Country Albums chart in July 1972, after spending 12 weeks on the list. The project's only single release was the title track, which was released in February 1972. The single became a major hit in the spring of 1972, peaking at number five on the Billboard Hot Country Singles chart. The song spent 15 weeks on the chart. The single also became a major hit in Canada where it peaked at number two on the RPM Country Singles chart. Upon its release, the album was reviewed favorably by Billboard in June 1972. Writers called the project "a sensitive, poignant collection of songs." Writers also praised Anderson's self-composed songs, calling them the album's "highlights". In later years, Allmusic only gave the effort two out of five possible stars.

== Track listing ==
Side one
No.	Title	Writer(s)	Length
1.	"All the Lonely Women in the World"	Bill Anderson	2:32
2.	"The Morning After Baby Let Me Down"	Ray Griff	2:58
3.	"Lonely Is Everything"	Jimmy Gateley	2:43
4.	"Here Comes Honey Again"	Sonny James; Carol Smith	2:30
5.	"If I Loved You Too Much (I'm Sorry)"	Anderson	2:40
6.	"May You Never Be Alone"	Hank Williams	2:42

Side two
No.	Title	Writer(s)	Length
1.	"Oh, Lonesome Me"	Don Gibson	2:11
2.	"Lonely Together"	Anderson	2:32
3.	"I Wonder What the Weather's Like in Charleston"	Moneen Carpenter	2:38
4.	"Lonely Weekends"	Charlie Rich	2:10
5.	"It Was Time for Me to Move on Anyway"	Anderson	2:31

== Personnel ==
All credits are adapted from the liner notes of Bill Anderson Songs for "All the Lonely Women in the World".

- Bill Anderson – lead vocals
- Hal Bauksbaum – photography
- Owen Bradley – record producer

== Chart performance ==
Chart (1972)	Peak position
US Top Country Albums (Billboard)	14

== Release history ==
Region	Date	Format	Label	Ref.
United States	May 1972	Vinyl	Decca	
Germany	May 1972	Vinyl	MCA	
