= Idema =

Idema is a Dutch and West Frisian patronymic surname meaning "son of Ide". Variant forms are Iedema, IJdema, and Ydema. People with the surname include:

- Dan Idema (born 1985), Canadian poker player
- David Cole Idema (born 1950), American rock singer
- Jonathan Idema (1956–2012), American bounty hunter and vigilante running a private prison in Afghanistan
- Wilt L. Idema (born 1944), Dutch Sinologist

== See also ==
- IDEMA
