= Laryngitis (disambiguation) =

Laryngitis is an inflammation of the larynx.

Laryngitis may also refer to:

- "Laryngitis" (Glee), a TV episode by Glee
- Obstructive laryngitis, a respiratory condition

== See also ==
- John Laurinaitis (born 1962), former professional wrestler
