= 1976 Country Music Association Awards =

Annual US music awards ceremony

- Date: October 11, 1976
- Location: Grand Ole Opry House, Nashville, Tennessee
- Hosted by: Johnny Cash; Roy Clark
- Most wins: Waylon Jennings; Willie Nelson (3 each)
- Most nominations: Waylon Jennings; Willie Nelson (5 each)

Television/radio coverage
- Network: CBS

The 1976 Country Music Association Awards, 10th Ceremony, was held on October 11, 1976, at the Grand Ole Opry House, Nashville, Tennessee, and was hosted by CMA Award winners Johnny Cash and Roy Clark.

== Winners and nominees ==
Winners in Bold.

Entertainer of the Year	Album of the Year
**Mel Tillis**; Waylon Jennings; Ronnie Milsap; Willie Nelson; Dolly Parton	**Wanted! The Outlaws — Waylon Jennings, Willie Nelson, Jessi Colter, Tompall Glaser**; 200 Years of Country Music — Sonny James; The Blind Man in the Bleachers — Kenny Starr; Night Things — Ronnie Milsap; Teddy Bear — Red Sovine
Male Vocalist of the Year	Female Vocalist of the Year
**Ronnie Milsap**; Waylon Jennings; Willie Nelson; Conway Twitty; Don Williams	**Dolly Parton**; Crystal Gayle; Emmylou Harris; Barbara Mandrell; Tammy Wynette
Vocal Group of the Year	Vocal Duo of the Year
**Statler Brothers**; The Amazing Rhythm Aces; Asleep at the Wheel; Dave & Sugar; Eagles	**Waylon Jennings and Willie Nelson**; Bill Anderson and Mary Lou Turner; George Jones and Tammy Wynette; Mel Tillis and Sherry Bryce; Conway Twitty and Loretta Lynn
Single of the Year	Song of the Year
**"Good Hearted Woman" — Waylon Jennings and Willie Nelson**; "The Blind Man in the Bleachers" — Kenny Starr; "Convoy" — C. W. McCall; "Teddy Bear" — Red Sovine; "The Door is Always Open" — Dave & Sugar	**"Rhinestone Cowboy" — Larry Weiss**; "The Blind Man in the Bleachers" — Sterling Whipple; "I'll Get Over You" — Richard Leigh; "The Door is Always Open" — Dickey Lee, Bob McDill; "Til I Can Make It on My Own" — Tammy Wynette, George Richey, Billy Sherrill
Instrumental Group of the Year	Instrumentalist of the Year
**Roy Clark and Buck Trent**; Asleep at the Wheel; The Charlie Daniels Band; Danny Davis and the Nashville Brass; The Waylors	**Hargus "Pig" Robbins**; Chet Atkins; Roy Clark; Johnny Gimble; Charlie McCoy

== Hall of Fame ==
Country Music Hall of Fame Inductees
- Paul Cohen
  Kitty Wells
