= 11th Academy of Country Music Awards =

US music awards ceremony in 1976

- Date: February 19, 1976
- Location: Hollywood Palladium, Los Angeles, California
- Hosted by: Marty Robbins

Highlights
- Most wins: Loretta Lynn (4)
- Most nominations: Glen Campbell; Loretta Lynn; (5 each)

Television/radio coverage
- Network: ABC

The 11th Academy of Country Music Awards ceremony was held on February 19, 1976, at the Hollywood Palladium, Los Angeles, California. It was hosted by Marty Robbins.

== Winners and nominees ==
Winners are shown in bold.

Entertainer of the Year	Album of the Year
**Loretta Lynn**; Glen Campbell; Roy Clark; John Denver; Mickey Gilley	**Feelins' — Loretta Lynn and Conway Twitty**; Before the Next Teardrop Falls — Freddy Fender; Keep Movin' On — Merle Haggard; Red Headed Stranger — Willie Nelson; Rhinestone Cowboy — Glen Campbell
Top Female Vocalist of the Year	Top Male Vocalist of the Year
**Loretta Lynn**; Anne Murray; Dolly Parton; Linda Ronstadt; Tanya Tucker	**Conway Twitty**; Glen Campbell; Mickey Gilley; Merle Haggard; Willie Nelson
Single Record of the Year	Song of the Year
**"Rhinestone Cowboy"** — **Glen Campbell**; "Before the Next Teardrop Falls" — Freddy Fender; "The Blind Man in the Bleachers" — Kenny Starr; "Blue Eyes Crying in the Rain" — Willie Nelson; "Overnight Sensation" — Mickey Gilley	**"Rhinestone Cowboy"** — **Larry Weiss**; "Before the Next Teardrop Falls" — Vivian Keith, Ben Peters; "Blue Eyes Crying in the Rain" — Fred Rose; "I'm Not Lisa" — Jessi Colter; "When the Tingle Becomes a Chill" — Lola Jean Dillon
Most Promising Male Vocalist	Most Promising Female Vocalist
**Freddy Fender**; Tom Bresh; T.G. Sheppard; Kenny Starr; Gene Watson	**Crystal Gayle**; Barbie Benton; Jessi Colter; Emmylou Harris; La Costa
Top Vocal Group of the Year
**Conway Twitty** **and** **Loretta Lynn**; Bill Anderson and Mary Lou Turner; Asleep at the Wheel; Eagles; Statler Brothers
Pioneer Award
**Roy Rogers**
