= It's Late =

It's Late may refer to:

- "It's Late" (Queen song), 1978
- "It's Late" (Ricky Nelson song), 1959
- "It's Late" (Degrassi Junior High), an episode of the TV series Degrassi Junior High
- "It's Late" (7th Heaven), an episode of the TV series 7th Heaven

== See also ==
- "It's Late (And I Have to Go)", a 1977 song by Carroll Baker
