= Kenny Starr =

American country singer (born 1952)

- Born: Kenneth Trebbe; September 21, 1952 (age 74); Topeka, Kansas, U.S.
- Origin: Burlingame, Kansas, U.S.
- Genre: Country
- Occupation: Singer
- Years active: 1973–1978
- Label: MCA Nashville

Kenneth Trebbe (born September 21, 1952), known professionally as Kenny Starr, is an American country singer.

== Biography ==
Starr was born in Topeka, Kansas and grew up in Burlingame, Kansas. At the age of nine, he fronted his own group, the Rockin' Rebels, and in his teens he played at local clubs leading a pop group, Kenny and the Imperials. Later switching to country music, a win in a local talent contest led him to perform on a bill containing Conway Twitty and Loretta Lynn. Lynn encouraged his efforts and, with her support, Starr secured a recording contract with MCA Records.

He recorded for MCA between 1973 and 1978, charting 13 singles, and releasing one studio album. For much of the 1970s, he was a member of Loretta Lynn's touring band, the Coal Miners.

Starr's biggest hit was a cover of David Geddes's single "The Blind Man in the Bleachers". Starr's version was a hit single in the U.S. on the country charts in 1976, reaching No. 2 on the Country Singles chart, and was a minor hit on the pop charts peaking at No. 58 on the Billboard Hot 100 and went to No. 1 on the country chart in Canada. The album from which it was taken, also called The Blind Man in the Bleachers, reached No. 12 on the Billboard Country Albums chart.

== Discography ==
=== Studio albums ===
List of studio albums, with selected details and peak chart positions
Title	Details	Peak chart positions
Title	Details	US Country
The Blind Man in the Bleachers	Released: December 1975; Label: MCA Records; Formats: LP	12

=== Singles ===
Year	Single	Chart Positions			
Year	Single	US Country	US	CAN Country	CAN
1973	"That's a Whole Lotta Lovin' (You Give Me)"	56	—	—	—
1973	"Ev'ryday Woman"	97	—	—	—
1975	"Put Another Notch in Your Belt"	89	—	—	—
1975	"The Blind Man in the Bleachers"	2	58	1	82
1976	"Tonight I'll Face the Man (Who Made It Happen)"	26	—	—	—
1976	"The Calico Cat"	73	—	—	—
1976	"Victims"^{A}	75	—	—	—
1976	"I Just Can't (Turn My Habit into Love)"	58	—	—	—
1977	"Me and the Elephant"	43	—	—	—
1977	"Old Time Lovin'"	64	—	—	—
1977	"Hold Tight"	25	—	—	—
1978	"The Rest of My Life"	72	—	—	—
1978	"Slow Drivin'"	70	—	—	—

- ^{A}B-side to "The Calico Cat."

== Awards and nominations ==
=== Academy of Country Music Awards ===
Year	Nominee / work	Award	Result
1976	Kenny Starr	Most Promising Male Vocalist	Nominated
1976	"The Blind Man in the Bleachers"	Single Record of the Year	Nominated

=== Country Music Association Awards ===
Year	Nominee / work	Award	Result
1976	"The Blind Man in the Bleachers"	Single of the Year	Nominated
1976	The Blind Man in the Bleachers	Album of the Year	Nominated
