= Portrait in the Window =

Single by Carroll Baker

from the album Sweet Sensation
- Released: 1978
- Genre: Country
- Label: RCA
- Songwriter(s): Carroll Beaulieu, Don Grashey

Carroll Baker singles chronology
"I Might as Well Believe (I'll Live Forever)" (1977)	"Portrait in the Window" (1978)	"Hooked on a Feeling" (1978)

"Portrait in the Window" is a single by Canadian country music artist Carroll Baker. Released in 1978, it was the fifth single from her album Sweet Sensation. The song reached number one on the RPM Country Tracks chart in Canada in July 1978.

== Chart performance ==
Chart (1978)	Peak position
Canadian RPM Country Tracks	1
