= Canadian Pacific (song) =

Single by George Hamilton IV

from the album Canadian Pacific
- B-side: "Sisters of Mercy"
- Released: June 1969
- Genre: Country
- Label: RCA
- Songwriter: Ray Griff

George Hamilton IV singles chronology
| "Back to Denver" (1969) | "Canadian Pacific" (1969) | "Carolina in My Mind" (1969) |

"Canadian Pacific" is a song written by Ray Griff and recorded by American country music artist George Hamilton IV. It was released in June 1969 as the first single from his album Canadian Pacific. The song, about a cross-Canada trip aboard the eponymous railway, peaked at number 25 on the Billboard Hot Country Singles chart. It also reached number 1 on the RPM Country Tracks chart in Canada.

The song describes the singer's trip across the country on the railway, beginning in Newfoundland and ending in BC, stopping in various provinces to work different jobs to make money, such as driving trucks in Quebec or working on an oil rig in Alberta. He eventually achieves his goal of returning to British Columbia and reuniting with his lover.

== Chart performance ==
| Chart (1969) | Peak position |
|---|---|
| US Billboard Hot Country Singles | 25 |
| Canadian RPM Country Tracks | 1 |
| Canadian RPM Adult Contemporary | 4 |
| Canadian RPM Top Singles | 9 |
