= I Might as Well Believe (I'll Live Forever) =

1977 song performed by Carroll Baker

Single by Carroll Baker

from the album Sweet Sensation
- Released: 1977
- Genre: Country
- Label: RCA
- Songwriter(s): George Petralia, Grant Nelson Hewlett

Carroll Baker singles chronology
"The Morning After Baby Let Me Down" (1977)	"I Might as Well Believe (I'll Live Forever)" (1977)	"Portrait in the Window" (1978)

"I Might As Well Believe (I'll Live Forever)" is a single by Canadian country music artist Carroll Baker. Released in 1977, it was the fourth single from her album Sweet Sensation. The song reached number one on the RPM Country Tracks chart in Canada in April 1978.

== Chart performance ==
Chart (1978)	Peak position
Canadian RPM Country Tracks	1
