= All the Lonely Women in the World =

Single by Bill Anderson

from the album Bill Anderson Sings for "All the Lonely Women in the World"
- B-side: "I'll Live for You"
- Released: February 1972
- Recorded: November 16, 1971
- Studio: Bradley Studio
- Genre: Country; Nashville Sound
- Length: 2:32
- Label: Decca
- Songwriter: Bill Anderson
- Producer: Owen Bradley

Bill Anderson singles chronology
"Dis-Satisfied" (1971)	"All the Lonely Women in the World" (1972)	"Don't She Look Good" (1972)

"All the Lonely Women in the World" is a song written and recorded by American country singer-songwriter Bill Anderson. It was released as a single in 1972 via Decca Records and became a major hit the same year.

== Background and release ==
"All the Lonely Women in the World" was recorded on November 16, 1971, at the Bradley Studio, located in Nashville, Tennessee. The sessions were produced by Owen Bradley, who would serve as Anderson's producer through most of years with Decca Records. The track "Lonely Weekends" was also recorded at the same session,

"All the Lonely Women in the World" was released as a single by Decca Records in February 1972. The song spent 15 weeks on the Billboard Hot Country Singles before reaching number two in May 1972. In Canada, the single reached number two on the RPM Country Songs chart. It was released on his 1972 LP, Bill Anderson Sings for "All the Lonely Women in the World".

== Track listing ==
7" vinyl single

- "All the Lonely Women in the World" – 2:32
- "It Was Time for Me to Move on Anyway" – 2:31

== Charts ==
=== Weekly charts ===
Chart (1971)	Peak position
Canada Country Songs (RPM)	2
US Hot Country Songs (Billboard)	5

=== Year-end charts ===
Chart (1972)	Position
US Hot Country Songs (Billboard)	40
