= The Hungry Fire of Love =

Single by Carroll Baker

from the album Carroll Baker
- Released: 1975
- Genre: Country
- Label: RCA
- Songwriter(s): Carroll Beaulieu

Carroll Baker singles chronology
"I've Never Been This Far Before" (1975)	"The Hungry Fire of Love" (1975)	"One Night of Cheatin'" (1975)

"The Hungry Fire of Love'" is a single by Canadian country music artist Carroll Baker. Released in 1975, it was the second single from her album Carroll Baker. The song reached number one on the RPM Country Tracks chart in Canada in August 1975.

== Chart performance ==
Chart (1975)	Peak position
Canadian RPM Country Tracks	1
