= If I Let Her Come In =

Single by Ray Griff

from the album Ray Griff
- Released: 1976
- Genre: Country
- Label: Capitol
- Songwriter(s): Ray Griff

Ray Griff singles chronology
"You Ring My Bell" (1975)	"If I Let Her Come In" (1976)	"I Love the Way That You Love Me" (1977)

"If I Let Her Come In" is a single by Canadian country music artist Ray Griff. Released in 1976, it was the second single from his album Ray Griff. The song reached number one on the RPM Country Tracks chart in Canada in April 1976.

== Chart performance ==
Chart (1976)	Peak position
Canadian RPM Country Tracks	1
U.S. Billboard Hot Country Singles	11
