= Tonight with Love =

Single by Carroll Baker

from the album Carroll Baker
- Released: 1976
- Genre: Country
- Label: RCA
- Songwriter(s): Carroll Baker, Don Grashey

Carroll Baker singles chronology
"One Night of Cheatin'" (1975)	"Tonight with Love" (1976)	"Why I Had to Pass This Way" (1976)

"Tonight with Love" is a single by Canadian country music artist Carroll Baker. Released in 1976, it was the fourth single from her album Carroll Baker. The song reached number one on the RPM Country Tracks chart in Canada in July 1976.

== Chart performance ==
Chart (1976)	Peak position
Canadian RPM Country Tracks	1
