= The Morning After Baby Let Me Down =

Single by Ray Griff

from the album Ray Griff Sings!
- B-side: "I'll Love You Enough for Both of Us"
- Released: 1971
- Genre: Country
- Label: Dot
- Songwriter(s): Ray Griff

Ray Griff singles chronology
"Wait a Little Longer" (1971)	"The Morning After Baby Let Me Down" (1971)	"It Rains Just the Same in Missouri" (1972)

"The Morning After Baby Let Me Down"

Single by Carroll Baker

from the album Sweet Sensation
- Released: 1977
- Genre: Country
- Label: RCA
- Songwriter(s): Ray Griff

Carroll Baker singles chronology
"It's Late (And I Have to Go)" (1977)	"The Morning After Baby Let Me Down" (1977)	"I Might as Well Believe (I'll Live Forever)" (1977)

"The Morning After Baby Let Me Down" is a song written and recorded by Canadian country music artist Ray Griff. Released in 1971, the song reached the top 20 on both the RPM Country Tracks chart in Canada and the Billboard Hot Country Singles chart in the United States. In 1977, Canadian country singer Carroll Baker covered the song and released it as the third single from her album Sweet Sensation. The song reached number one on the RPM Country Tracks chart in Canada in November 1977.

== Chart performance ==
=== Ray Griff ===
Chart (1971–1972)	Peak position
Canadian RPM Country Tracks	12
U.S. Billboard Hot Country Singles	14

=== Carroll Baker ===
Chart (1977)	Peak position
Canadian RPM Country Tracks	1
Canadian RPM Top Singles	79
