= One Night of Cheatin' (Ain't Worth the Reapin') =

1975 single from album Carroll Baker

Single by Carroll Baker

from the album Carroll Baker
- Released: 1975
- Genre: Country
- Label: RCA
- Songwriter(s): Carroll Baker

Carroll Baker singles chronology
"The Hungry Fire of Love" (1975)	"One Night of Cheatin'" (1975)	"Tonight with Love" (1976)

"One Night of Cheatin' (Ain't Worth the Reapin')" is a single by Canadian country music artist Carroll Baker. Released in 1975, it was the third single from her album Carroll Baker. It reached number one on Canada's RPM Country Tracks chart in March 1976.

== Chart performance ==
Chart (1975–1976)	Peak position
Canadian RPM Country Tracks	1
