= Run Joey Run =

American pop song

- Cover with lyrics

Single by David Geddes
- B-side: "Honey Don't Blow It"
- Released: July 1975
- Recorded: 1975
- Genre: Pop
- Length: 2:55
- Label: Big Tree
- Songwriters: Paul Vance; Jack Perricone
- Producer: Paul Vance

David Geddes singles chronology
"House on Holly Road" (1972)	"Run Joey Run" (1975)	"The Last Game of the Season (A Blind Man in the Bleachers)" (1975)

"Run Joey Run" is a teenage tragedy song performed by soft rock singer David Geddes.

It was his biggest US Top 40 hit single, peaking at No. 4 on Billboard's Hot 100 Chart in the fall of 1975, and topping the charts on Cashbox Magazine's Top 100.

== Story ==
The song opens with a brief snippet of wordless choral a cappella singing, then abruptly cuts to the voice of a woman pleading with her father:

Daddy, please don't! It wasn't his fault; he means so much to me. Daddy, please don't! We're going to get married; just you wait and see.

Geddes sings from first person narrative in the character of Joey who recalls the events leading up to a recent tragedy involving his now-deceased girlfriend Julie, an event he involuntarily relives in his mind every time he tries to sleep.

Late one night, Julie calls Joey, warning him not to come to her house; she and her father have just had a violent fight about her relationship with Joey. Though not explicitly stated in the lyrics, her father's desire for Joey to "pay for what we've done" and her promise of marriage implies that the couple have had sex and Julie has become pregnant. Julie warns Joey that her father is armed and urges him to run away. However, Joey, ignoring his own peril, rushes to her house instead. A battered and crying Julie rushes to Joey's arms.

Julie's father sneaks up behind them with his gun, intending to shoot Joey, but before the father pulls the trigger, Julie attempts to push Joey out of danger; when her father shoots, he hits Julie instead. Julie falls, mortally wounded. Joey holds her in his arms; she quietly repeats her pleas to her father as her last words but loses consciousness as she again says "we're gonna get married".

The accompaniment suddenly stops, the choral section is reprised, and the song closes with the refrain "Run, Joey, run" repeated several times before the song ends.

== Reception ==
"Run Joey Run" was released in the late summer of 1975, and by October the song had peaked at No. 4 on the Billboard Hot 100. Geddes's only other hit, "The Last Game of the Season (A Blind Man in the Bleachers)" peaked at No. 18 on the Billboard Hot 100 in December 1975 and No. 23 in Cashbox (December 6, 1975).

According to Casey Kasem's "American Top 40", David Geddes had recorded several singles for major record labels; none of them were successful. He decided to leave the music business and return to school. Geddes was attending law school at Wayne State University in Detroit when he was called by producer Paul Vance to record a song that Vance and Jack Perricone (also known as Perry Cone) had written. Perricone, who had previously arranged a couple of recordings that David Geddes had made with a group called the Rock Garden, remembered Geddes's voice from his earlier records and played the recordings for Vance, who thought that Geddes would be perfect for their new song. Geddes flew to New York City to record the vocals for the song (with Julie's lines sung by Vance's daughter Paula) and then returned to Detroit to begin his third year of law school. Several months later, the song, "Run Joey Run", began to race up the Billboard Hot 100. Geddes dropped out of law school with only one semester to go and re-entered the music business.

== Chart performance ==
=== Weekly charts ===
Chart (1975)	Peak position
Australia (Kent Music Report)	36
New Zealand (Listener)	6
Canada RPM Top Singles	12
US Billboard Hot 100	4
US Cashbox Top 100	1

=== Year-end charts ===
Chart (1975)	Rank
Canada	118
US (Joel Whitburn's Pop Annual)	60
US Cashbox 1975 Year End Chart	81

== Glee cover ==
"Run Joey Run"

Single by Lea Michele, Mark Salling, Jonathan Groff, Cory Monteith, Heather Morris and Naya Rivera
- Released: 2010
- Recorded: 2010
- Genre: Pop rock
- Length: 2:51
- Label: Columbia
- Songwriter: Paul Vance

Glee Cast singles chronology
"Physical" (2010)	"Run Joey Run" (2010)	"Total Eclipse of the Heart" (2010)

The song was covered in the Glee episode "Bad Reputation".

== Other versions ==
Billed as Jan and Joey, Tony Burrows recorded the song as a duet in late 1975.
