= Why I Had to Pass This Way =

Single by Carroll Baker

from the album Carroll Baker
- Released: 1976
- Genre: Country
- Label: RCA
- Songwriter(s): Don Grashey

Carroll Baker singles chronology
"Tonight with Love" (1976)	"Why I Had to Pass This Way" (1976)	"It's My Party" (1977)

"Why I Had to Pass This Way" is a single by Canadian country music artist Carroll Baker. Released in 1976, it was the fifth single from her album Carroll Baker. The song reached number one on the RPM Country Tracks chart in Canada in November 1976.

== Chart performance ==
Chart (1976)	Peak position
Canadian RPM Top Singles	67
Canadian RPM Country Tracks	1
