= Bad Reputation (Glee) =

- Glee episode
- Episode no.: Season 1 Episode 17
- Directed by: Elodie Keene
- Written by: Ian Brennan
- Production code: 1ARC16
- Original air date: May 4, 2010

Guest appearances
- Jonathan Groff as Jesse St. James; Molly Shannon as Brenda Castle; Iqbal Theba as Principal Figgins; Patrick Gallagher as Ken Tanaka; Stephen Tobolowsky as Sandy Ryerson; Naya Rivera as Santana Lopez; James Earl as Azimio; Max Adler as Dave Karofsky; Heather Morris as Brittany Pierce; Harry Shum, Jr. as Mike Chang; Dijon Talton as Matt Rutherford; Robin Trocki as Jean Sylvester; Olivia Newton-John as herself

Episode chronology
← Previous "Home"	Next → "Laryngitis"
- Glee season 1

"Bad Reputation" is the seventeenth episode of the American television series, Glee. The episode premiered on the Fox network on May 4, 2010. It was directed by Elodie Keene, and written by series creator Ian Brennan. In "Bad Reputation", cheerleading coach Sue Sylvester (Jane Lynch) is publicly ridiculed when a video of her dancing to Olivia Newton-John's "Physical" is posted on YouTube. A salacious list about members of the glee club circulates the school, leading certain members to try to earn themselves a bad reputation. Newton-John guest-stars as herself in the episode, and Molly Shannon makes her first of two appearances (both in season 1) as a teacher at the glee club's school. Following their romance in the episode "Mash-Up", club members Rachel (Lea Michele) and Puck (Mark Salling) are reunited, a decision made by the producers due to the unexpected popularity of the pairing.

The episode features cover versions of five songs, all of which were released as singles, available for digital download, and two of which are included on the soundtrack album Glee: The Music, Volume 3 Showstoppers. "Bad Reputation" was watched by 11.62 million American viewers and received mixed reviews from critics. Darren Franich of Entertainment Weekly and Bobby Hankinson of the Houston Chronicle both considered it a return to form following disappointing episodes. Franich also praised the episode's cover version of "Ice Ice Baby" by Vanilla Ice, which in contrast was criticized by Raymund Flandez of The Wall Street Journal and Gerrick D. Kennedy of the Los Angeles Times, with Kennedy deeming the performance his least favorite moment of the entire series thus far.

== Plot ==
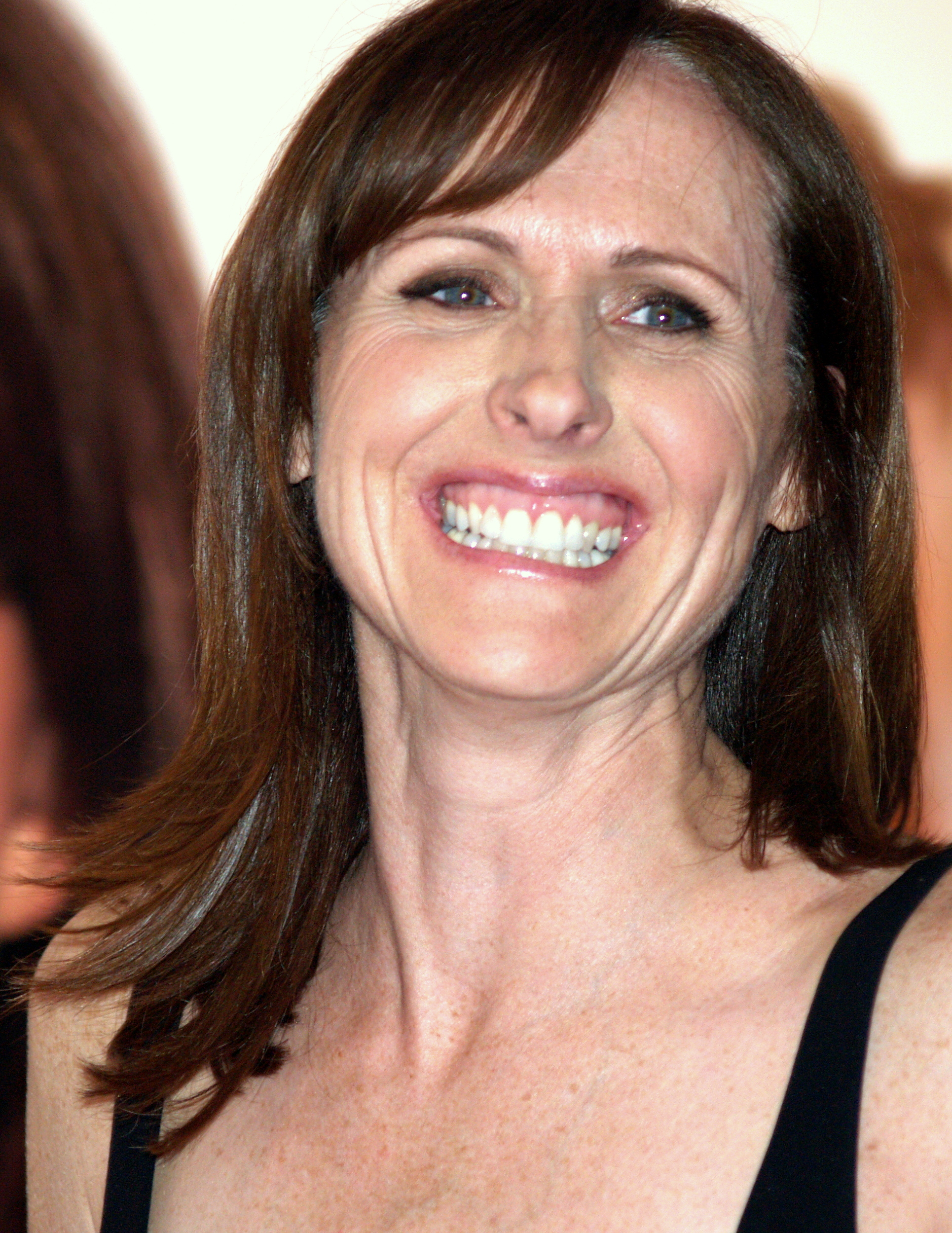
Molly Shannon makes her first of two appearances in "Bad Reputation" as Brenda Castle, an alcoholic astronomy teacher and badminton coach.

When Kurt (Chris Colfer) steals a video of cheerleading coach Sue Sylvester (Jane Lynch) performing Olivia Newton-John's "Physical" to a Jazzercise routine, the glee club members decide to post it on YouTube as a prank. The video becomes a viral hit and Sue is mortified. In retaliation, she gives Principal Figgins (Iqbal Theba) a list she has found, called a "glist", which ranks the students in the glee club based on a scale of sexual promiscuity. The list goes: Quinn, Santana, Puck, Brittany, Jesse, Finn, Mike, Matt and Rachel, from most to least. Figgins tells club director Will Schuester (Matthew Morrison) that he must either find the creator of the list, or he will be forced to disband the glee club and suspend all of its members. Will reprimands the club members, and for their weekly club assignment, he has the students find songs with bad reputations and rehabilitate them, performing Vanilla Ice's "Ice Ice Baby" as an example.

Sue is laughed at by her co-workers, who have seen the video, and is mocked by new alcoholic astronomy teacher and badminton coach Brenda Castle (Molly Shannon). Sue is reminded by her sister, Jean (Robin Trocki), who has Down syndrome, that when they were hurt as children they would volunteer at an animal shelter as a reminder there was always someone less fortunate than themselves. In light of her sister's advice, Sue decides to act as a therapist to guidance counselor Emma Pillsbury (Jayma Mays), informing her that Will has been unfaithful to her. Emma confronts Will in the teachers' lounge, publicly shaming him.

Kurt, Mercedes (Amber Riley), Artie (Kevin McHale), and Tina (Jenna Ushkowitz) are upset over not being included on the list, while Brittany (Heather Morris) is puzzled at not being listed among the top three, given that she has made out with everyone in the school: boys, girls, and the janitor. They perform a rendition of "U Can't Touch This" in the school library to cause a disruption in the hope of earning a bad reputation, but their plan backfires when the librarian asks them to perform it at her church's Sunday service. Next, Kurt confesses to Sue that he is the one who stole her video, expecting to be punished and also gain a more dangerous reputation. Instead, she thanks him, having recently been contacted by Olivia Newton-John, who had seen Sue's video and requested her help remaking the "Physical" video. The song's re-release gains Sue a position in the top 700 recording artists, which ends the ridicule of her colleagues. She donates her share of the profits to her sister's residential care facility.

After apologizing to Emma and presenting her with flowers, Will sees a depressed-looking Quinn (Dianna Agron) in the hallway and realizes that she is responsible for the list. He confronts Quinn, who confesses. To prevent her from being suspended, Will lies to Figgins that no culprit has been found, but convinces him that as no new lists have been posted, the matter should be dropped.

Rachel (Lea Michele) asks Puck (Mark Salling) to assist her in the glee club assignment, creating a video for David Geddes' "Run Joey Run". But she secretly also recruits her ex-boyfriend Finn (Cory Monteith) and her current boyfriend Jesse St. James (Jonathan Groff), triple-casting them in the role of her film boyfriend, Joey, in a bid to improve her glist rating. When Rachel plays the video in class, all three are surprised, offended and angered by her deception. Jesse breaks up with Rachel as a result, and she sings Bonnie Tyler's "Total Eclipse of the Heart" as the club members walk out of the classroom, leaving her behind.

== Production ==
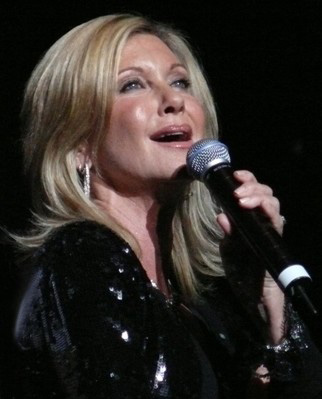
Olivia Newton-John guest-stars in the episode as herself.

Recurring characters who appear in the episode are glee club members Brittany (Heather Morris), Santana Lopez (Naya Rivera), Mike Chang (Harry Shum, Jr.), Matt Rutherford (Dijon Talton) and Jesse St. James (Jonathan Groff). Adults who appear in this episode are Principal Figgins (Iqbal Theba), former glee club director Sandy Ryerson (Stephen Tobolowsky), football coach Ken Tanaka (Patrick Gallagher) and Sue's sister Jean Sylvester (Robin Trocki). Mary Jo Catlett appears as recently widowed teacher Mrs. Carlisle, and Molly Shannon makes her first appearance in a recurring role as new astronomy teacher and badminton coach Brenda Castle. Special guest star Olivia Newton-John appears as herself, portraying the "dark side" of herself; a "mixture of mean and diva". She and Lynch produced an exact re-creation of the original "Physical" video, filming of which took twelve hours. Series musical producer Adam Anders felt that Newton-John's appearance in the episode was organic, explaining: "The best part of Glee is introducing new music to an older generation and old music to a newer generation. There's so much great music. We all listen to music in a vacuum, then we're exposed to things and love it. Olivia Newton-John is an example of that. It's a perfect marriage between the songs that were chosen and the storyline. When that happens, it moves people."

"Bad Reputation" shows the reunion of glee club members Rachel and Puck. The two first became involved in Glee's eighth episode, "Mash-Up", but at the time, series creator Ryan Murphy did not expect the pairing to be well received by viewers. He believed that viewers would find Rachel "far too irritating" for Puck, and so was surprised by the positive fan response which emerged. Although Murphy described this response as "strange and bizarre", explaining that he had believed fans would prefer for Rachel to be with Finn, as a result he planned to revisit their romance later in the first season. The first thirteen episodes had already been filmed by the time "Mash-Up" aired, and so Murphy wrote a special episode to air after the mid-season break, in which the characters could reunite in some way. Despite the popularity of the pairing—referred to by the portmanteau "Puckleberry" in the media—the series writers intend to retain Puck's "bad boy" persona, and ultimately plan on pairing him with most of the female characters.

The episode features cover versions of five songs: "Ice Ice Baby" by Vanilla Ice, "U Can't Touch This" by MC Hammer, Newton-John's "Physical", "Run Joey Run" by David Geddes and "Total Eclipse of the Heart" by Bonnie Tyler. Each of the songs performed were released as singles, available for download. "Physical" and "Total Eclipse of the Heart" are also included on the soundtrack album Glee: The Music, Volume 3 Showstoppers.

== Reception ==
=== Ratings ===
In its original broadcast, "Bad Reputation" was watched by 11.62 million American viewers and attained a 4.9/13 rating/share in the 18-49 demographic. In the UK, the episode was watched by 1.65 million viewers and was the most-watched show of the week on the non-terrestrial channels. In Canada, "Bad Reputation" was watched by 1.95 million viewers, making Glee the eleventh most-viewed show of the week. In Australia, Glee drew its highest-ever overnight audience with 1.31 million viewers, and won its timeslot in all key demographics. Its consolidated ratings were adjusted up to 1.41 million, making "Bad Reputation" the 13th most-viewed program of the week.

=== Critical response ===
The episode received mixed reviews from critics. Darren Franich of Entertainment Weekly praised the episode, writing that while there had been a "self-congratulatory quality" to Glee since its mid-season break, "Bad Reputation" was a return to "the Glee [he] fell in tormented love with." He graded the songs performed "C−" through to "A−", commending what he deemed "by far the greatest performance of "Ice Ice Baby" ever". The Houston Chronicle's Bobby Hankinson also felt the episode was a return to form. He praised the decision not to "apply meaningless rules to their musical selections", writing: "The freedom to not have to use songs by one artist let the storylines take priority, and not sticking to songs that share a common lyrical theme kept those choices from feeling too forced." Dave Itzkoff of The New York Times recapped the episode positively, describing it as: "pack[ing] more camp into an hour's worth of television than most kids will get all summer." Emily VanDerWerff of The A.V. Club graded "Bad Reputation" "B+", writing that she: "enjoyed the episode quite a bit, even as [she] found some of it rather messy." Though VanDerWerff felt that not everything in the episode worked, she stated: "the stuff that did reminded me that what I like about the show is its all-out embrace of a crazy mishmash of tones."

Raymund Flandez of The Wall Street Journal criticized most of the musical performances in the episode, calling "Run Joey Run" the highlight of an otherwise "slow, forced show". Flandez opined of "Ice Ice Baby": "Will, kicking it old school, doesn't cut it with his '80s-flashback moves because a.) he takes himself too seriously and b.) he looks like he's in a J.Crew mag, not part of 2 Live Crew." Gerrick D. Kennedy of the Los Angeles Times wrote that he hated the episode, similarly calling "Run Joey Run" his favorite song, but noting that that was "not hard considering the songbook that was offered". Kennedy deemed the "Ice Ice Baby" performance his least favourite moment of the entire series thus far. He concluded: "Each of the musical numbers felt about two minutes longer than they should have been. I love Newton-John’s walk-on cameo, but I don’t want them to fall into the habit of re-creating music videos frame by frame: It was cute - once. It sounds harsh, but I could have completely done without the episode. It was almost as if they needed filler just to showcase the "Physical" video." In December 2012, TV Guide named their rendition one of Glee's worst performances.
