= It's Late (And I Have to Go) =

Single by Carroll Baker

from the album Sweet Sensation
- Released: 1977
- Genre: Country
- Label: RCA
- Songwriter(s): Carroll Beaulieu

Carroll Baker singles chronology
"It's My Party" (1977)	"It's Late (And I Have to Go)" (1977)	"The Morning After Baby Let Me Down" (1977)

"It's Late (And I Have to Go)" is a single by Canadian country music artist Carroll Baker. Released in 1971, it was the second single from her album Mem'ries of Home and peaked at number forty-four on the RPM Country Tracks chart. The song was re-released in 1977 and reached number one on the RPM Country Tracks chart in Canada in July 1977.

== Chart performance ==
Chart (1971)	Peak position
Canadian RPM Country Tracks	44
Chart (1977)	Peak position
Canadian RPM Country Tracks	1
