= Laryngitis (Glee) =

- Glee episode
- Episode no.: Season 1 Episode 18
- Directed by: Alfonso Gomez-Rejon
- Written by: Ryan Murphy
- Production code: 1ARC17
- Original air date: May 11, 2010

Guest appearances
- Mike O'Malley as Burt Hummel; Zack Weinstein as Sean Fretthold; Naya Rivera as Santana Lopez; Eve Gordon as Mrs. Fretthold; Josh Sussman as Jacob Ben Israel; Rizwan Manji as Dr. Gidwani; Heather Morris as Brittany Pierce; Harry Shum Jr. as Mike Chang; Dijon Talton as Matt Rutherford; Ashley Fink as Lauren Zizes

Episode chronology
← Previous "Bad Reputation"	Next → "Dream On"
- Glee season 1

"Laryngitis" is the eighteenth episode of the American television series Glee. The episode premiered on the Fox network on May 11, 2010. It was directed by Alfonso Gomez-Rejon and written by series creator Ryan Murphy. In "Laryngitis", glee club member Puck (Mark Salling) dates Mercedes (Amber Riley) in an attempt to raise his social status. Kurt (Chris Colfer) is jealous of the time his father is spending with Finn (Cory Monteith), and Rachel (Lea Michele) worries about her future when she is diagnosed with tonsillitis. Mike O'Malley guest-stars as Kurt's father Burt, and Zack Weinstein appears as disabled former football player Sean Fretthold.

The episode features cover versions of seven songs, five of which were released as singles, available for digital download, and three of which are included on the soundtrack album Glee: The Music, Volume 3 Showstoppers. "Laryngitis" was watched by 11.57 million American viewers and received mixed reviews from critics. Emily VanDerWerff of The A.V. Club, Bobby Hankinson of the Houston Chronicle, Vanity Fair's Brett Berk and James Poniewozik of Time all enjoyed the episode, noting that it came after several lesser-quality episodes since the show's return from its mid-season break. In contrast, Lisa Respers France of CNN felt that "Laryngitis" was lecturing in tone, and more sad than it was comedic. Henrik Batallones of BuddyTV and Entertainment Weekly's Darren Franich both expressed concern with the disability plot, the former finding it forced and the latter questioning whether Glee honors its disabled actors, or uses them shamelessly.

== Plot ==
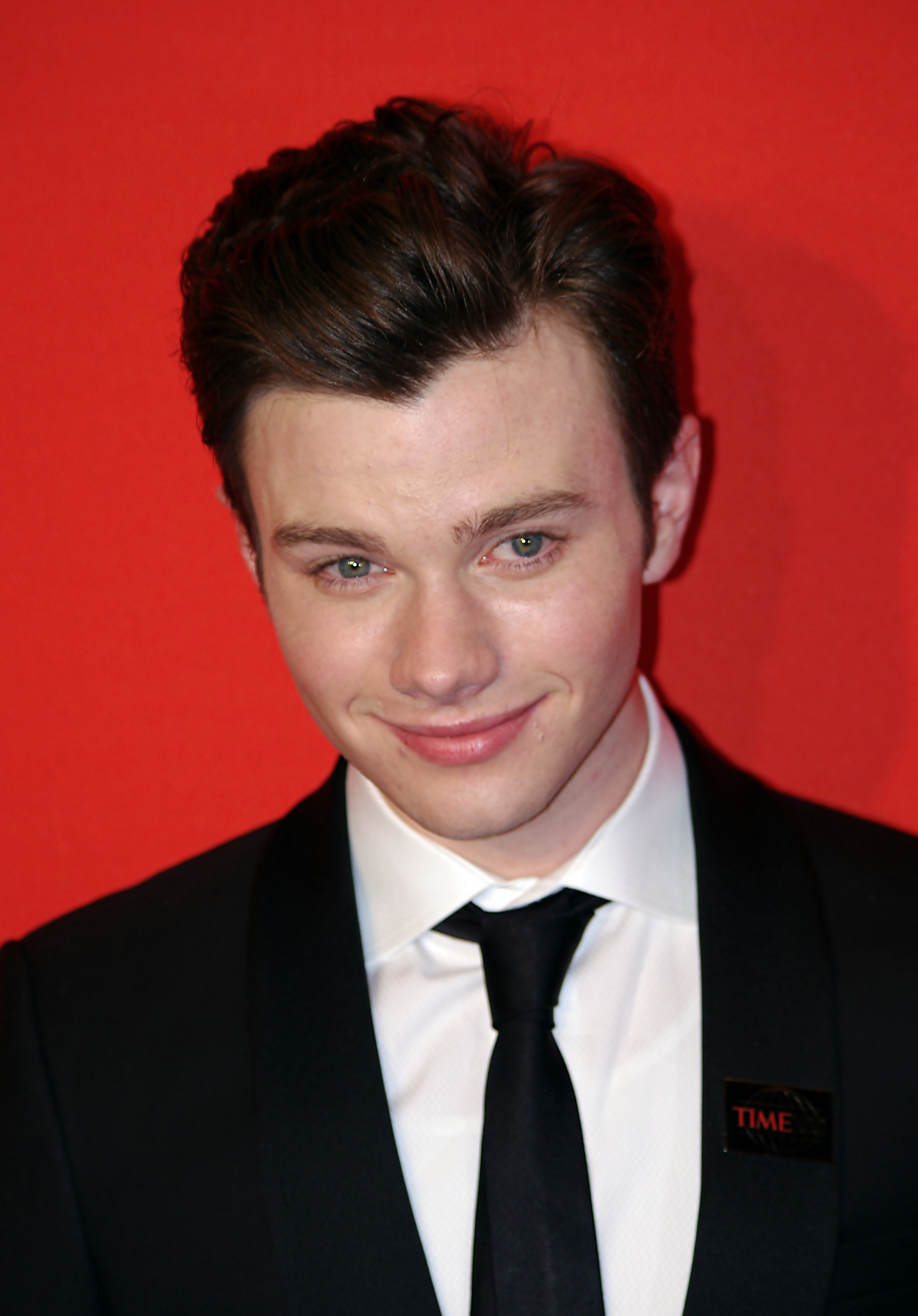
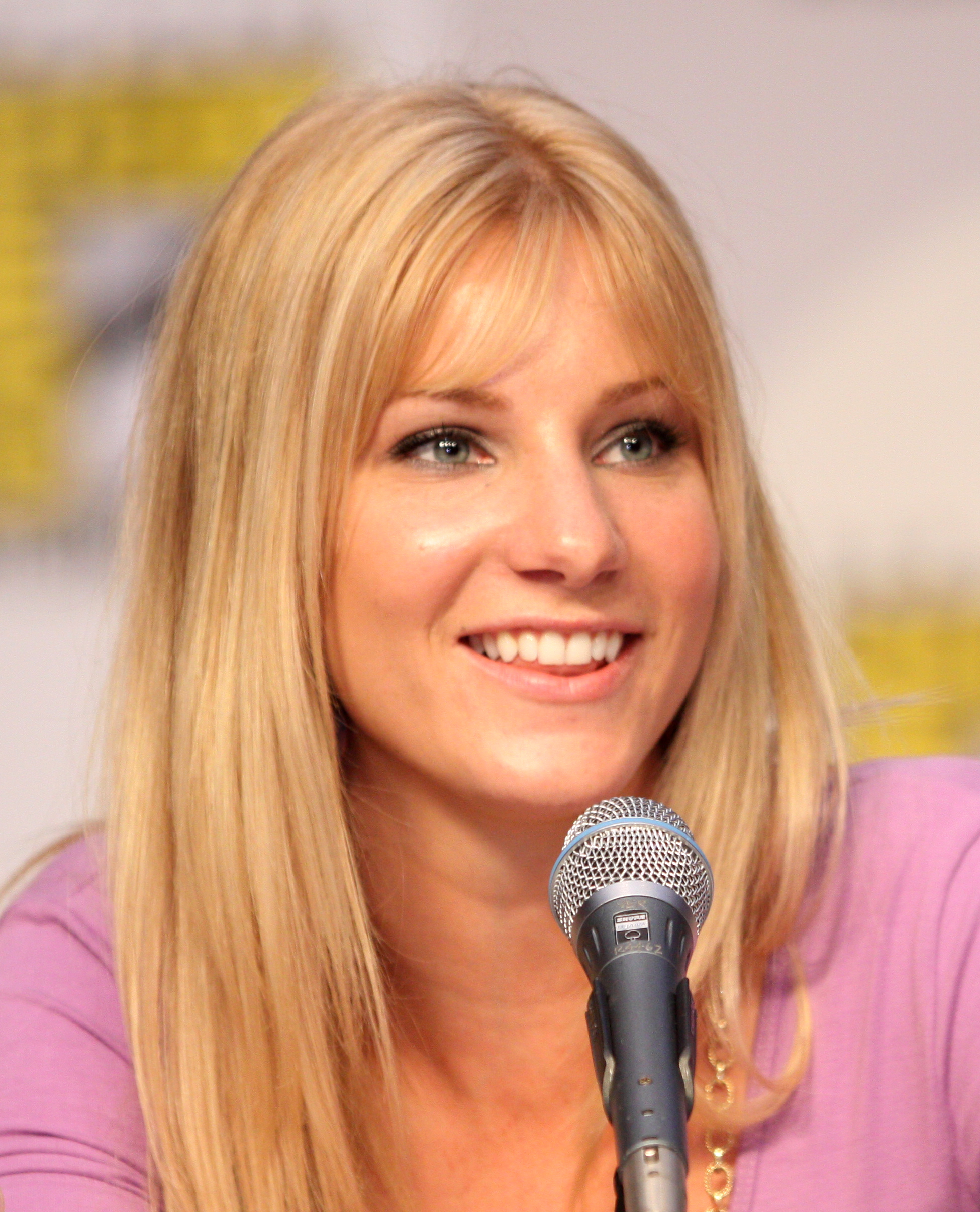
Kurt (Chris Colfer, left) makes out with Brittany (Heather Morris, right) to impress his father

When glee club member Puck (Mark Salling) has his mohawk shaved off at the insistence of his dermatologist for medical purposes, he discovers he is no longer considered a credible bully. He realizes that Mercedes (Amber Riley) has become popular since joining the cheerleading squad, and resolves to date her. Mercedes initially attempts to dissuade him, but after the two sing a duet of "The Lady Is a Tramp", she warms to him. Puck's former girlfriend Santana (Naya Rivera) is jealous, and she and Mercedes sing "The Boy Is Mine". When Mercedes realizes that Puck has returned to being a bully, she breaks up with him and resigns from the cheerleading squad.

Meanwhile, Rachel (Lea Michele) realizes that some glee club members are faking their singing. She tells glee club director Will Schuester (Matthew Morrison), complaining that she is doing most of the work, exhausting herself and getting ill in the process. She reveals the non-participants as Finn (Cory Monteith), Quinn (Dianna Agron), Puck, Brittany (Heather Morris), and Santana. Will gathers the students and gives them a new task for the week: each club member will have to do solos, and each must choose a song that best represents their feelings.

Rachel then confronts the non-participating glee members and insults them, but when she starts to sing Miley Cyrus's "The Climb", she sounds terrible: she has started to lose her voice. Later, after an examination by Rachel's doctor reveals that she suffers from tonsillitis and may need to have her tonsils removed, she is afraid to have the surgery lest it affect her voice, as she believes her singing ability is her only asset. Finn, who accompanied her to the doctor's, tries to convince her that he loves everything about her and that there is more to her than her voice. He warns her that if she loses her ability to sing then Jesse (Jonathan Groff) would no longer find her attractive. Rachel tells Finn that she still cares about Jesse and that he needs to move on, prompting Finn to sing "Jessie's Girl" as his solo assignment. To put her fear into perspective, Finn introduces her to his friend Sean (Zack Weinstein), who was paralyzed from the upper chest down during a football game. At first, Rachel is nervous and overwhelmed by the meeting, but Finn forces her to stay as Sean tells her about his grueling experiences with his disability and how he realized that a person is not just one single thing. She then begins to understand why Finn brought her and thanks Sean as she leaves.

In the meantime, Kurt (Chris Colfer) is jealous of the time his father Burt (Mike O'Malley) is spending with Finn, now that their parents are dating, and attempts to emulate Burt's personality. He dresses in outdoorsman gear, sings John Mellencamp's "Pink Houses" during a glee club rehearsal, and attempts to have a fling with Brittany, making out with her in his bedroom and ensuring that his father is aware of his new behavior. Frustrated that Burt is still spending time alone with Finn, Kurt reverts to his former personality and sings "Rose's Turn". Burt overhears his performance, praises Kurt's singing and apologizes for not spending enough time with him. He reassures Kurt that he still loves him, and always will, no matter who his son chooses to be with.

Rachel eventually recovers her voice after taking the antibiotics her doctor prescribed. She goes back to Sean's house to thank him again, and offers to give him singing lessons. They start singing U2's "One", and the scene switches back and forth between her duet with Sean and the full glee club's performance of the song on stage at school.

== Production ==
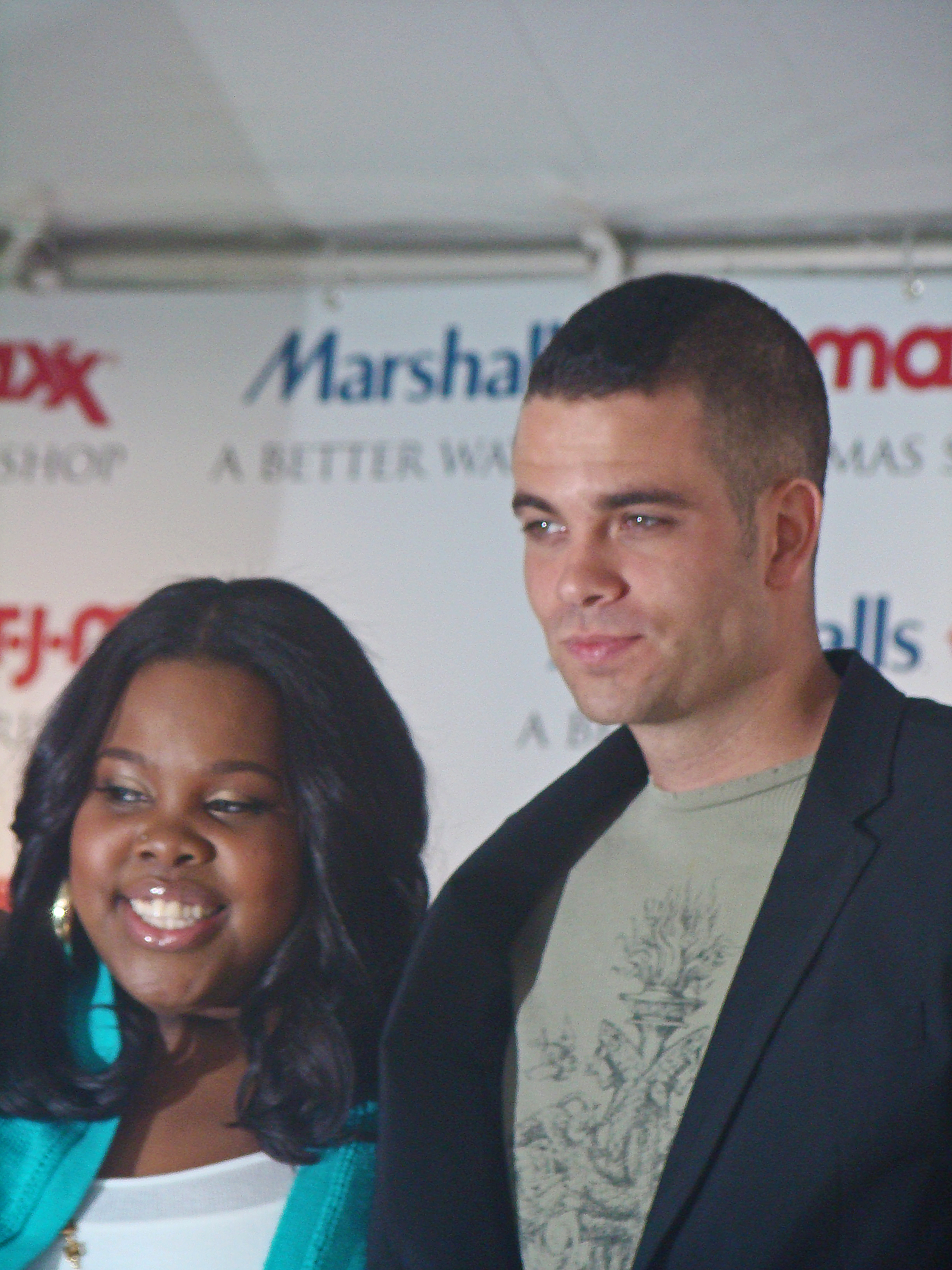
In "Laryngitis", Riley (left) and Salling (right) duet on Sammy Davis Jr.'s "The Lady Is a Tramp".

Recurring characters who appear in "Laryngitis" are Kurt's father Burt Hummel (Mike O'Malley), glee club members Santana Lopez (Naya Rivera), Brittany (Heather Morris), Mike Chang (Harry Shum Jr.) and Matt Rutherford (Dijon Talton), school reporter Jacob Ben Israel (Josh Sussman) and AV club president Lauren Zizes (Ashley Fink). Rizwan Manji plays Dr. Gidwani. Zack Weinstein guest stars as Sean Fretthold, a football player who was paralyzed below the upper chest after injuring his spinal cord at C4 in an accident, similar to the actor's injury in real life. Sean is the second wheelchair-using character to appear on Glee. In November 2009, the episode "Wheels" attracted criticism from disability advocates, who called attention to the fact that disabled character Artie Abrams is played by able-bodied actor Kevin McHale. Weinstein defended McHale's casting, opining that if he was the best auditioning actor for the role, then his ability to walk should be irrelevant. However, Weinstein also stated he "would like to see wheelchair users given the chance to audition and be seriously considered for roles that aren't specifically written for someone with a disability." Weinstein revealed that he wished he had auditioned for the role of Artie, and that Glee was his favorite show. Around February 2010, Weinstein's agent got him an audition to play Sean, and within a week and a half, he learned he had got the part. Glee was Weinstein's first professional acting job. He called the twelve hours he spent filming his scenes "twelve of the most important hours of [his] life".

The episode features cover versions of seven songs. Rachel performs "The Climb" by Miley Cyrus, and Finn sings "Jessie's Girl" by Rick Springfield. Puck and Mercedes duet on Sammy Davis Jr.'s "The Lady Is a Tramp", and Mercedes and Santana sing "The Boy Is Mine" by Brandy and Monica. Kurt sings John Mellencamp's "Pink Houses", and "Rose's Turn" from Gypsy: A Musical Fable. The glee club closes the episode with "One" by U2, featuring guest vocals from Weinstein as Sean. "Jessie's Girl", "The Lady Is a Tramp", "The Boy Is Mine", "Rose's Turn" and "One" were released as singles, available for digital download. "The Lady Is a Tramp", "Rose's Turn" and "One" are also included on the soundtrack album Glee: The Music, Volume 3 Showstoppers.

== Reception ==
=== Ratings ===
In its original broadcast, "Laryngitis" was watched by 11.57 million American viewers and attained a 4.8/12 rating/share in the 18-49 demographic. In the United Kingdom, the episode was watched by 1.81 million viewers and was the most-watched show of the week on the non-terrestrial channels. In Canada, "Bad Reputation" was watched by 1.97 million viewers, making Glee the 13th most watched program of the week. In Australia, the episode was watched by 1.44 million viewers, making "Laryngitis" the 15th most-watched program of the week.

=== Critical response ===
The episode received mixed reviews from critics. Lisa Respers France of CNN felt that "Laryngitis" highlighted a trend of Glee storylines becoming progressively sadder, rather than comedic. She wrote that the plotlines came across as lecturing, and concluded: "I still heart Glee, which is clearly one of the best shows on television right now. I just think they may want to lighten the life lessons a bit or spread them out more over several episodes rather than clobbering us all at once." Henrik Batallones of BuddyTV wrote that he was uncertain what to make of the episode, noting: "Sure, there were some high points, and it was a pretty enjoyable watch, but unlike the last few episodes this one left me a little high and dry." Batallones observed that the Sean storyline felt "totally forced into the episode, making Rachel's epiphany [...] very forced and unnatural." Entertainment Weekly's Darren Franich was also troubled by the storyline, noting: "It seems like the height of vanity to basically use this storyline to teach Rachel an important lesson about being herself. [...] Glee has used disabled actors before, and I think it's worth debating whether the show honors that or uses it shamelessly."

Emily VanDerWerff of The A.V. Club graded the episode "B+". While she had been disappointed with several episodes since the show's mid-season break, VanDerWerff noted: "Glee still has its inconsistencies, but it's getting back to the show I so enjoyed last fall." She wrote of the Sean storyline that it: "should feel offensive but mostly skates away from actually being so because it treats the paralyzed character with a great deal of respect". Bobby Hankinson of the Houston Chronicle also noted that he had been underwhelmed with the show since its return, but loved "Laryngitis", writing: "The story focused exclusively on the kids—not Mr. Shue or Sue Sylvester—and the performances were realistically small-scale. [...] All that classic Glee charm came washing over me once more and it was glorious." Gerrick D. Kennedy of the Los Angeles Times similarly stated: "When Glee is at its best, you get episodes like this week's. There were no gimmicks, no over-the-top productions, no unnecessary stars [...] It was just great storytelling and superb finger-snapping music." Vanity Fair's Brett Berk deemed "Laryngitis" a "truly successful episode", but also highlighted the show's inconsistency in quality since its return. James Poniewozik of Time called "Laryngitis" the first episode of Glee since its mid-season break that he enjoyed "(mostly) without reservation." Eric Goldman of IGN rated the episode 8.8/10, deeming it one of his favorite episodes of Glee, "with some of the funniest material the show has delivered thus far."
