= David Geddes (musician) =

American singer (born 1950)

- Born: David Cole Idema; July 1, 1950 (age 75)
- Origin: Michigan, United States
- Genres: Pop, soft rock
- Occupations: Vocalist, drummer
- Instruments: Vocals, drums
- Years active: 1970s
- Labels: Capitol; Big Tree

David Cole Idema (born July 1, 1950), best known by the stage name David Geddes, is a soft rock singer who had a US Top 5 hit with "Run Joey Run", which peaked at number four in October 1975.

== Early life and education ==
Under his real name, Geddes was the drummer/vocalist for the cult band the Fredric (also known as Rock Garden) and released several records in the early 1970s, one of which, "House on Holly Road", received some airplay around the state of Michigan. He took the stage name Geddes from a street in Ann Arbor, Michigan, where he attended college at the University of Michigan.

== Career ==
According to Casey Kasem's American Top 40, Geddes had recorded several singles for major record labels, none of which became a hit. He decided to leave the music business and return to school. He was attending law school at Wayne State University in Detroit when he was called by the producer Paul Vance to record a song that Vance had written. Vance had remembered Geddes' voice from his earlier records and thought he would be perfect for his new song. Geddes flew to New York City to record the vocals for the song, and then returned to Detroit to begin his third year of law school. Several months later, the song, "Run Joey Run", began to race up the Hot 100. He dropped out of law school with just one semester to go and returned to the music business.

Geddes had only one other notable entry, the top 20 hit "The Last Game of the Season (A Blind Man in the Bleachers)", which entered the Hot 100 top 40 three weeks after "Run Joey Run" had left the Hot 100.

"Run Joey Run" was used on the May 4, 2010, episode of Glee.

== Discography ==
=== Albums ===
Run Joey Run (1975)

=== Singles ===
Year	Single	Chart positions			
Year	Single	US	CAN	AUS	NZ
1972	"House on Holly Road"	-	-	-	
1975	"Run Joey Run"	4	12	36	6
1975	"The Last Game of The Season (A Blind Man In The Bleachers)"	18	42	-	-
1976	"Stephanie"	-	-	-	-
1976	"Trouble"	-	-	-	-
