= Ray Griff =

Canadian singer-songwriter (1940–2016)

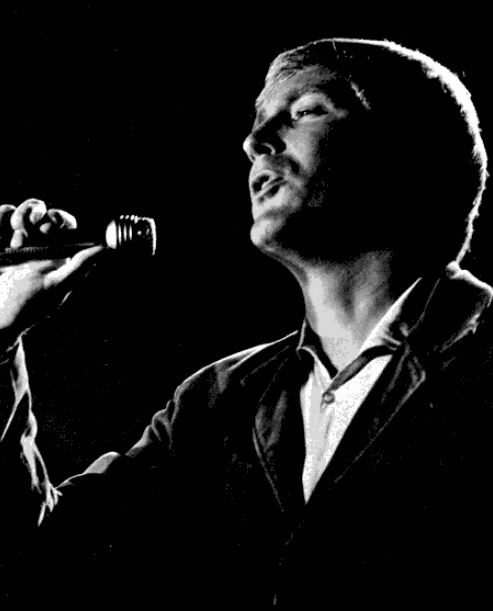
- Griff in 1969

Background information
- Birth name: John Raymond David Griff
- Born: April 22, 1940; Vancouver, British Columbia, Canada
- Died: March 9, 2016 (aged 75)
- Genres: Country
- Occupation: Singer-songwriter
- Instrument: Vocals
- Years active: 1964–2016
- Labels: Dot, Capitol, GRT
- Formerly of: George Hamilton IV, Jerry Lee Lewis

John Raymond David Griff (April 22, 1940 – March 9, 2016) was a Canadian country music singer and songwriter, born in Vancouver and raised in Toronto. His songwriting credits reached over 2500 songs, many of which were recorded by Nashville's top recording artists.

== Early life and career ==
Griff was born in Vancouver, British Columbia, Canada and raised in Winfield, Alberta. He began songwriting in the early 1960s and had early cuts by Johnny Horton, Jim Reeves, and others. Griff moved to Nashville, Tennessee in 1964 to pursue his music career full-time. His first records as a singer were released in the late 1960s and Griff had his first hit, "Patches", a remake of the Clarence Carter soul hit in 1970 which peaked at No. 26 in Billboard. Griff recorded for the small country label Royal American and later moved on to Dot Records without much success. His stint at Capitol Records from 1975 to 1979 proved more successful, racking up eight more country top 40 hits, the most successful being 1976's "If I Let Her Come In" which peaked at No. 11.

Griff's success as a songwriter, however, always overshadowed his recording work with over 700 songs recorded, including the major hits "Canadian Pacific" for George Hamilton IV, "Who's Gonna Play This Old Piano" for Jerry Lee Lewis, and "Baby" for Wilma Burgess. Others who had major hit records with Griff songs include Faron Young, Porter Wagoner & Dolly Parton, Bob Luman, Gene Watson, and Johnny Duncan.

Griff returned to Canada in the late 1970s and remained active on the country music scene there as an artist, songwriter, and record producer. He lived a quiet life in Calgary, Alberta, occasionally performing at country venues with musicians from the area, most notably the Ranchman's Inn.

== Later years ==
In 2008, Griff was awarded the Lifetime Achievement Award by SOCAN at the annual SOCAN Awards in Toronto.

Griff had battled throat cancer in his later years, and he died on March 9, 2016, from pneumonia following surgery. He was 75.

== Discography ==
=== Albums ===
Year	Album	US Country	Label
1968	A Ray of Sunshine	42	Dot
1972	The Entertainer	—	Dot
1972	Ray Griff Sings!	—	Dot
1973	Songs for Everyone	22	Dot
1974	Expressions	47	ABC/Dot
1976	Ray Griff	31	Capitol
1976	The Last of the Winfield Amateurs	44	Capitol
1977	Raymond's Place	—	Capitol
1978	Ray's Bar and Grill	—	Boot-London
1979	Canada	—	Boot-London
1980	Maple Leaf	—	Boot-London
1981	Adam's Child	—	Boot-London
1982	Greatest Hits	—	Boot-London
1983	You Can Count on Me	—	RCA
1984	You	—	RCA
1985	The Sky's the Limit	—	RCA
1987	My Kind of Country	—	Bookshop
1988	Ray Griff & Friends: Honest to Goodness Amigos	—	Warner Music Canada
1990	There'll Always Be Christmas	—	ATI
1993	Ray Griff: Through the Years, Vol. 1 & 2	—	Focus

=== Singles ===
Year	Title	Peak chart positions			Album
Year	Title	CAN Country	CAN AC	US Country	Album
1965	"Weeping Willow Tree"^{A}	6	—	—	Non-album song
1965	"Don't Lead Me On"	10	—	—	Non-album song
1965	"Golden Years"	2	—	—	Non-album song
1967	"Your Lily White Hands"	—	—	49	A Ray of Sunshine
1968	"A Ray of Sunshine"	—	—	—	A Ray of Sunshine
1968	"The Sugar from My Candy"	14	—	50	A Ray of Sunshine
1969	"Wanderin' Through the Valley"	18	—	—	The Entertainer
1969	"The Entertainer"	6	—	—	The Entertainer
1970	"Patches"	13	30	26	Ray Griff Sings!
1970	"Ain't Nowhere to Go"	42	18	—	Non-album song
1971	"Wait a Little Longer"	—	—	—	Ray Griff Sings!
1971	"The Morning After Baby Let Me Down"	12	—	14	Ray Griff Sings!
1972	"It Rains Just the Same in Missouri"	19	—	62	Songs for Everyone
1973	"A Song for Everyone"	38	78	66	Songs for Everyone
1973	"What Got to You (Before It Got to Me)"	5	—	46	Songs for Everyone
1973	"Darlin'"	26	—	42	Songs for Everyone
1974	"That Doesn't Mean (I Don't Love My God)"	12	—	65	Expressions
1974	"The Hill"	18	—	91	Expressions
1975	"If That's What It Takes"	—	—	65	Non-album song
1975	"You Ring My Bell"	40	—	16	Ray Griff
1976	"If I Let Her Come In"	1	—	11	Ray Griff
1976	"I Love the Way That You Love Me"	36	—	40	Ray Griff
1976	"That's What I Get (For Doin' My Own Thinkin')"	9	—	24	The Last of the Winfield Amateurs
1976	"The Last of the Winfield Amateurs"	11	—	27	The Last of the Winfield Amateurs
1977	"You Put the Bounce Back into My Step"	—	—	flip	The Last of the Winfield Amateurs
1977	"A Passing Thing"	20	—	28	The Last of the Winfield Amateurs
1977	"A Cold Day in July"	33	—	69	Raymond's Place
1977	"Raymond's Place"	41	—	52	Raymond's Place
1978	"Canada"	22	—	—	Canada
1979	"Betty Mitchell"	43	—	—	Canada
1979	"Friends and Neighbours"	55	—	—	Canada
1981	"Jimmy, Luke and Me"	48	—	—	Maple Leaf
1981	"Draw Me a Line"	24	—	87	You Can Count on Me
1982	"Things That Songs Are Made Of"	30	—	95	You Can Count on Me
1983	"If Tomorrow Never Comes"	8	—	86	You Can Count on Me
1983	"You Can Count on Me"	33	—	—	You Can Count on Me
1984	"So Close"	30	—	—	You
1984	"You"	—	—	—	You
1984	"Diamond in the Rough"	52	—	—	You Can Count on Me
1985	"A Light in the Window"	48	—	—	The Sky's the Limit
1985	"I Did"	51	—	—	The Sky's the Limit
1986	"What My Woman Does to Me"	50	—	71	The Sky's the Limit
1986	"I Can't See Me"	—	—	—	The Sky's the Limit
1987	"That Old Montana Moon"	40	—	—	My Kind of Country
1988	"Damned If I Do, Damned If I Don't"	—	—	—	My Kind of Country
1988	"Light as a Feather" (with Glory-Anne Carriere)	37	—	—	Ray Griff & Friends: Honest to Goodness Amigos
1988	"Honest to Goodness Amigos" (with Ronnie Prophet)	86	—	—	Ray Griff & Friends: Honest to Goodness Amigos
1989	"Flames"	78	—	—	Non-album song
1990	"Daybreak"	47	—	—	Non-album song

- ^{A}"Weeping Willow Tree" also peaked at number 39 on the Canadian RPM Top 40 chart.
