= The Blind Man in the Bleachers =

1975 single by David Geddes

"The Last Game of the Season (A Blind Man in the Bleachers)"

Single by David Geddes
- B-side: "Run Joey Run"
- Released: November 1975
- Genre: Pop
- Length: 3:30
- Label: Big Tree
- Songwriter: Sterling Whipple
- Producer: Paul Vance

David Geddes singles chronology
| "Run Joey Run" (1975) | "The Last Game of the Season (A Blind Man in the Bleachers)" (1975) | "Stephanie" (1976) |

"The Blind Man in the Bleachers"

Single by Kenny Starr

from the album The Blind Man in the Bleachers
- B-side: "Texas Proud"
- Released: October 1975
- Recorded: August 17, 1975
- Genre: Country
- Length: 3:25
- Label: MCA 40524
- Songwriter: Sterling Whipple
- Producer: Snuffy Miller

Kenny Starr singles chronology
| "Put Another Notch in Your Belt" (1975) | "The Blind Man in the Bleachers" (1975) | "Tonight I'll Face the Man (Who Made It Happen)" (1976) |

"The Blind Man in the Bleachers" is a single written by Sterling Whipple and famously performed by American singer David Geddes. His version, titled "The Last Game of the Season (A Blind Man in the Bleachers)", reached number 18 on the Billboard Hot 100 in 1975.

That same year it was covered by country music artist Kenny Starr, appearing on his album The Blind Man in the Bleachers. The song peaked at number 2 on the Billboard Hot Country Singles chart. It also reached number 1 on the RPM Country Tracks chart in Canada.

== Song story ==
The song is a salute to high school football and focuses on a junior varsity football player (who rarely, if ever sees action in varsity games) and his father, a blind man who sits next to the press box – where the speaker is located. The father longs to hear his son's name be announced but is resigned to the boy being a star in his dreams.

The meat of the story comes later in the song, with the scene shifting to the final night of the regular season and the regular fans puzzled at why the boy's father did not show up for the game. At halftime, with several players injured, the boy takes an emergency phone call and is late to the field. The coach, unaware of what is going on, begins to scold the boy but the boy insists that he is going in on the next play. He does, takes the field on the first play and immediately runs for a touchdown. The boy eventually helps rally his team from a deficit and get a come-from-behind win.

In the post-game huddle, the boy becomes emotional and – when asked to explain why he played so well – reveals that his father had died earlier in the evening (this was why he was not at the game) and – presumably having gone to Heaven – was now granted eyesight and got to watch his son play and be the player of the game.

== Chart performance ==
=== David Geddes ===
| Chart (1975–76) | Peak position |
|---|---|
| US Billboard Hot 100 | 18 |
| Canada RPM Top Singles | 42 |

=== Kenny Starr ===
| Chart (1975–1976) | Peak position |
|---|---|
| US Billboard Hot 100 | 58 |
| US Hot Country Songs (Billboard) | 2 |
| Canadian RPM Country Tracks | 1 |
| Canadian RPM Top Singles | 82 |

=== Year-end charts ===
| Chart (1976) | Position |
|---|---|
| US Hot Country Songs (Billboard) | 42 |
