= Carroll Baker (singer) =

Canadian singer and songwriter

Carroll Baker CM
- Born: Carroll Anne Baker; March 4, 1949 (age 77); Port Medway, Nova Scotia, Canada
- Genres: Country
- Occupation: Singer-songwriter
- Years active: 1970–present
- Labels: Gaiety; Columbia Records

Carroll Anne Baker CM (born March 4, 1949) is a Canadian country music singer and songwriter.

== Early life ==
Baker was born in Port Medway, Nova Scotia. Baker was surrounded by music as a little girl but she objected when her musical family launched into their repertoire of country songs. She preferred rock 'n' roll. She even objected when her father, a fiddler with many accomplishments, said to her: "One day, you'll love country music." She doubted it. Growing up in a small town in Nova Scotia, Baker was immediately drawn to singing and making music with her friends and get into some occasional trouble as she states "there was nothing to do, except get into trouble, and we did our share of that too." She made her first appearance singing in her local church.

During her teen years, she was practicing regularly and singing for her church on Sundays. "I worked every church in town, the Anglican church in the morning, the Baptist church in the afternoon and the Pentecostal at night," she said. Port Medway's population was too small to have a school so she went to school at a nearby village named Bridgewater, Nova Scotia, approximately 40 kilometers north of where she lived. Her talent was not recognized right away, however. At school, she says she was considered one of the "hicks from the sticks" and the local glee club would not let her sing. At the age of 16, she moved to Toronto. When she heard country music in Toronto, she said it made her homesick for Nova Scotia and that is where her love for country music began. She made her stage debut in 1968 when her husband persuaded her to get on stage with a local band that was playing at the bar. The band members were initially impressed, even asking her to join them, but they soon became frustrated with her lack of progress and they eventually let her go.

== Career ==
Songwriter George Petralia heard Baker sing and introduced her to producer Don Grashey. Her first single in 1970, "Mem-ries of Home", was written by Petralia and released on Grashey's Gaiety label. It was a minor hit, staying on the charts for 26 weeks. Based on the success of this first recording, Grashey contacted several record companies regarding a recording contract for her and finally made a deal with Columbia Records.

She recorded two albums for Columbia with limited commercial success. Eventually she went back to Gaiety Records. She then was signed to RCA Records where she had several gold and platinum records. From RCA, she joined Tembo records where she was again awarded platinum record status for her record sales.

In 1973, Baker became pregnant and announced her intention to withdraw from the music business. Grashey convinced her to continue, and the pair traveled to Nashville to record four songs. Her first top ten record came from that session, "Ten Little Fingers", a song about a little girl, written by Don Grashey; this song remains one of her most popular songs to this day. She also had a hit with a bluegrass remake of "It's My Party". All told, between 1970 and 1982, Baker released 31 consecutive charting singles. Twelve of these reached the top of the charts.

Baker had her own series, The Carroll Baker Jamboree, on CBC television in the summer of 1983 and frequently appeared on The Tommy Hunter Show. In 1986, her album Hymns of Gold was certified platinum.

== Awards ==
Baker received the Juno Award for Country Female Vocalist of the Year five times, including awards in 1977, 1978 and 1979. In 1976, she won a Big Country Award for best album of the year, and in 1977 and 1978, she was named top female country singer at the same awards.

She was inducted into the Canadian Country Music Hall of Fame in 1992. In 2009, she was made a Member of the Order of Canada "for her achievements as a Canadian country music singer and songwriter".
