= 1976 in country music =

This is a list of notable events in country music that took place in the year 1976.

== Events ==
- January 3 — Austin City Limits debuts as a regular series on PBS. For many years, the show is taped at the University of Texas at Austin. Although not exclusively country — styles would range from western swing, Texas blues, Tejano music, progressive country, rock n' roll, jazz, alternative country, alternative rock, folk music and jam band — the show is widely hailed as a showcase of music of diverse styles and would be heavily influential in many country music artists' styles.

=== No dates ===
- The CB radio craze was sweeping country music, as no less than three No. 1 songs are about citizens-band radios. C. W. McCall's "Convoy" — about a band of truck drivers who fight back against redneck police officers — spends four of its six weeks at No. 1 in January, and goes on to be Billboard's No. 1 country song of 1976. Other top songs where CB radios were central to the plot were:
  - "The White Knight" by Cledus Maggard & The Citizen's Band, about a lead-footed truck driver who is led into a speed trap by a corrupt state trooper.
  - "Teddy Bear" by Red Sovine, a sentimental recitation about a fatherless, physically handicapped boy who keeps in touch with truck drivers. He states his lone wish is to ride around with his father, but since that can't happen, other truck drivers make good on the wish by showing up at the young lad's home and giving him rides.
- Production began on Dolly Parton's syndicated variety show Dolly! Though Parton was said to have been less than pleased with the end result, and the show only lasted for one season, it expanded her audience at a time when she was in the midst of refocusing her career from that of a specifically country performer to an entertainer with broader pop and mainstream appeal.

== Top hits of the year ==
=== Number one hits ===
==== United States ====
(as certified by Billboard)

Date	Single Name	Artist	Wks. No.1	CAN peak	Spec. Note
January 31	This Time I've Hurt Her More than She Loves Me	Conway Twitty	1
February 7	Sometimes	Bill Anderson and Mary Lou Turner	1	3	^{[B] – Bill Anderson}^{[C] – Mary Lou Turner}
February 14	The White Knight	Cledus Maggard & the Citizen's Band	1	8	^{[C]}: Cledus Maggard & the Citizen's Band is a pseudonym for Jay Huguely.
February 21	Good Hearted Woman	Waylon Jennings and Willie Nelson	3	5
March 13	The Roots of My Raising	Merle Haggard	1	7
March 20	Faster Horses (The Cowboy and the Poet)	Tom T. Hall	1	2	^{[B]}
March 27	'Til the Rivers All Run Dry	Don Williams	1	—
April 3	You'll Lose a Good Thing	Freddy Fender	1	—	^{[B]}
April 10	'Til I Can Make It on My Own	Tammy Wynette	1
April 17	Drinkin' My Baby (Off My Mind)	Eddie Rabbitt	1		^{[A]}
April 24	Together Again	Emmylou Harris	1	3	^{[A]} Cover of the Buck Owens' #1 song in 1964.
May 1	Don't the Girls All Get Prettier at Closing Time	Mickey Gilley	1
May 8	My Eyes Can Only See as Far as You	Charley Pride	1
May 15	What Goes On When the Sun Goes Down	Ronnie Milsap	1
May 22	After All the Good is Gone	Conway Twitty	1
May 29	One Piece at a Time	Johnny Cash	2
June 12	I'll Get Over You	Crystal Gayle	1	2	^{[A]}
June 19	El Paso City	Marty Robbins	2
July 3	All These Things	Joe Stampley	1	22
July 10	The Door Is Always Open	Dave & Sugar	1		^{[A]}
July 17	Teddy Bear	Red Sovine	3		^{[B]}
August 7	Golden Ring	George Jones and Tammy Wynette	1	5
August 14	Say It Again	Don Williams	1	4
August 21	Bring It On Home to Me	Mickey Gilley	1
August 28	(I'm A) Stand by My Woman Man	Ronnie Milsap	2
September 11	I Don't Want to Have to Marry You	Jim Ed Brown and Helen Cornelius	2	7	^{[C] – Jim Ed Brown}^{[C] – Helen Cornelius}
September 25	If You've Got the Money I've Got the Time	Willie Nelson	1	5
October 2	Here's Some Love	Tanya Tucker	1	2
October 9	The Games That Daddies Play	Conway Twitty	1
October 16	You and Me	Tammy Wynette	2	6
October 30	Among My Souvenirs	Marty Robbins	2	3	^{[B]}
November 6	Cherokee Maiden	Merle Haggard	1		Cover of the Bob Wills hit.
November 13	Somebody Somewhere (Don't Know What He's Missin' Tonight)	Loretta Lynn	2
November 27	Good Woman Blues	Mel Tillis	2
December 11	Thinkin' of a Rendezvous	Johnny Duncan	2		^{[A]}
December 25	Sweet Dreams	Emmylou Harris	2

Notes

- 1 No. 1 song of the year, as determined by Billboard.
- A First Billboard No. 1 hit for that artist.
- B Last Billboard No. 1 hit for that artist.
- C Only Billboard No. 1 hit for that artist to date.

==== Canada ====
(as certified by RPM)

Date	Single Name	Artist	Wks. No.1	U.S. peak	Spec. Note
January 10	Easy as Pie	Billy "Crash" Craddock	1	2	^{[B]}
January 17	Country Boy (You Got Your Feet in L.A.)	Glen Campbell	2	3	^{[B]}
January 31	The Blind Man in the Bleachers	Kenny Starr	1	2	^{[C]}
February 7	This Time I Hurt Her More than She Loves Me	Conway Twitty	1
February 14	The Happiness of Having You	Charley Pride	1	3
February 21	Don't Believe My Heart Can Stand Another You	Tanya Tucker	1	4
February 28	Somebody Loves You	Crystal Gayle	1	8	^{[A]}
March 6	One Way Ticket to a Lady	Jerry Palmer	1	—	^{[C]}
March 13	One Night of Cheatin'	Carroll Baker	1	—
March 20	On the Road	Dick Damron	1	—
March 27	Motels and Memories	T. G. Sheppard	1	7
April 3	Angels, Roses and Rain	Dickey Lee	1	9	^{[C]}
April 10	You Are the Song (Inside of Me)	Freddie Hart	1	11	^{[B]}
April 17	(Till) I Kissed You	Connie Smith	1	10	^{[B]}
April 24	If I Let Her Come In	Ray Griff	1	11	^{[C]}
May 1	'Til I Can Make It on My Own	Tammy Wynette	1
May 8	Drinkin' My Baby (Off My Mind)	Eddie Rabbitt	1		^{[A]}
May 15	Don't the Girls All Get Prettier at Closing Time	Mickey Gilley	1
May 22	My Eyes Can Only See as Far as You	Charley Pride	1
May 29	What Goes On When the Sun Goes Down	Ronnie Milsap	1
June 5	After All the Good is Gone	Conway Twitty	2
June 19	One Piece at a Time	Johnny Cash	1
June 26	El Paso City	Marty Robbins	1
July 3	I Wouldn't Want It Any Other Way	Lyle	1	—	^{[C]}
July 10	Tonight with Love	Carroll Baker	1	—
July 17	The Door is Always Open	Dave & Sugar	1		^{[C]}
July 24	Vaya con Dios	Freddy Fender	1	7
July 31	Here Comes the Freedom Train	Merle Haggard	1	10
August 7	Teddy Bear	Red Sovine	2		^{[C]}
August 21	The Letter	Conway Twitty and Loretta Lynn	2	3
September 4	Rocky Mountain Music	Eddie Rabbitt	1	5
September 11	Bring It On Home to Me	Mickey Gilley	1
September 18	(I'm A) Stand by My Woman Man	Ronnie Milsap	2
October 2	Can't You See	Waylon Jennings	1	4
October 9	All I Can Do	Dolly Parton	2	3	^{[2]}: Fell to #4 on the week of October 16.
October 16	If You Keep Throwing Dirt	Family Brown	1	—	^{[A]}
October 30	The Games That Daddies Play	Conway Twitty	1
November 6	The Wreck of the Edmund Fitzgerald	Gordon Lightfoot	1	50	^{[B]}
November 13	Why I Had to Pass This Way	Carroll Baker	1	—
November 20	A Whole Lotta Things to Sing About	Charley Pride	1	2
November 27	Cherokee Maiden	Merle Haggard	1
December 4	Somebody Somewhere (Don't Know What He's Missin' Tonight)	Loretta Lynn	1
December 11	Living It Down	Freddy Fender	1	2
December 18	Good Woman Blues	Mel Tillis	1
December 25	Thinkin' of a Rendezvous	Johnny Duncan	1		^{[A]}

Notes

- 2 Song dropped from No. 1 and later returned to top spot.
- A First RPM No. 1 hit for that artist.
- B Last RPM No. 1 hit for that artist.
- C Only RPM No. 1 hit for that artist.

=== Other major hits ===
==== Singles released by American artists ====
US	CAN	Single	Artist
3	3	9,999,999 Tears	Dickey Lee
8	—	After the Storm	Wynn Stewart
9	16	Afternoon Delight	Johnny Carver
20	5	All the King's Horses	Lynn Anderson
9	10	Amazing Grace (Used to Be Her Favorite Song)	Amazing Rhythm Aces
24	19	Another Morning	Jim Ed Brown
3	6	Baby Boy	Mary Kay Place
16	34	The Battle	George Jones
20	—	Because You Believed In Me	Gene Watson
5	5	Broken Lady	Larry Gatlin
22	7	A Butterfly for Bucky	Bobby Goldsboro
17	13	Can You Hear Those Pioneers	Rex Allen, Jr.
15	—	Cheatin' Is	Barbara Fairchild
8	10	Come on In	Sonny James
5	3	Come on Over	Olivia Newton-John
13	6	Cowboy	Eddy Arnold
4	2	Don't Pull Your Love	Glen Campbell
14	12	Don't Stop Believin'	Olivia Newton-John
19	18	Don't Stop in My World (If You Don't Mean to Stay)	Billy Walker
17	18	Drop Kick Me Jesus	Bobby Bare
12	20	The End Is Not in Sight (The Cowboy Tune)	Amazing Rhythm Aces
12	26	Everything I Own	Joe Stampley
21	15	Feel Again	Faron Young
18	9	Flash of Fire	Hoyt Axton
12	28	Fly Away	John Denver
17	8	Forever Lovers	Mac Davis
9	12	Fox on the Run	Tom T. Hall
18	14	The Good Night Special	Little David Wilkins
23	20	Greener Than the Grass (We Laid On)	Tanya Tucker
2	3	Hank Williams, You Wrote My Life	Moe Bandy
3	3	Her Name Is	George Jones
15	23	Here Comes That Girl Again	Tommy Overstreet
11	13	Here I Am Drunk Again	Moe Bandy
19	11	Hey, Lucky Lady	Dolly Parton
28	15	Hey Shirley (This Is Squirrely)	Shirley & Squirrely
5	2	Hillbilly Heart	Johnny Rodriguez
6	—	Home Made Love	Thom Bresh
16	—	Honey Hungry	Mike Lunsford
6	—	Hurt	Elvis Presley
9	38	I.O.U.	Jimmy Dean
3	2	I Couldn't Be Me Without You	Johnny Rodriguez
13	—	I Don't Wanna Talk It Over Anymore	Connie Smith
15	—	I Loved You All the Way	Donna Fargo
10	—	I Met a Friend of Yours Today	Mel Street
2	2	I Wonder If I Ever Said Goodbye	Johnny Rodriguez
11	7	I'd Have to Be Crazy	Willie Nelson
12	7	I'll Be Your San Antone Rose	Dottsy
3	2	I'm Gonna Love You	Dave & Sugar
17	17	I'm So Lonesome I Could Cry	Terry Bradshaw
16	25	I'm Sorry Charlie	Joni Lee
2	—	If I Had It to Do All Over Again	Roy Clark
15	14	In Some Room Above the Street	Gary Stewart
8	6	Is Forever Longer Than Always	Porter Wagoner and Dolly Parton
11	20	It's Morning (And I Still Love You)	Jessi Colter
4	5	Just in Case	Ronnie Milsap
19	39	Laura (What's He Got That I Ain't Got)	Kenny Rogers
3	5	Lawdy Miss Clawdy	Mickey Gilley
5	12	Let It Shine	Olivia Newton-John
6	14	Let's Put It Back Together Again	Jerry Lee Lewis
34	8	Like a Sad Song	John Denver
18	48	Little at a Time	Sunday Sharpe
11	—	Lone Star Beer and Bob Wills Music	Red Steagall
5	5	Lonely Teardrops	Narvel Felts
17	23	Longhaired Redneck	David Allan Coe
16	4	Lookin' for Tomorrows (And Findin' Yesterdays)	Mel Tillis
19	25	Love Lifted Me	Kenny Rogers
11	15	Love Revival	Mel Tillis
23	17	Lovin' Somebody on a Rainy Night	LaCosta
15	36	Mamas Don't Let Your Babies Grow Up to Be Cowboys	Ed Bruce
36	20	A Mansion on the Hill	Michael Martin Murphey
12	8	Me and Ole C.B.	Dave Dudley
15	9	Mental Revenge	Mel Tillis
5	4	Misty Blue	Billie Jo Spears
20	40	Mr. Doodles	Donna Fargo
14	—	My Prayer	Narvel Felts
24	17	Negatory Romance	Tom T. Hall
18	28	Never Did Like Whiskey	Billie Jo Spears
16	37	The Night Time and My Baby	Joe Stampley
23	17	Oh, Sweet Temptations	Gary Stewart
3	2	One of These Days	Emmylou Harris
7	4	Overnight Sensation	Mickey Gilley
26	16	Paradise	Lynn Anderson
10	7	Peanuts and Diamonds	Bill Anderson
14	3	The Prisoner's Song	Sonny James
20	26	Red, White and Blue	Loretta Lynn
17	—	Redneck! (The Redneck National Anthem)	Vernon Oxford
2	6	Remember Me (When the Candle Lights Are Gleaming)	Willie Nelson
17	—	Sad Country Song	Thom Bresh
10	—	Save Your Kisses for Me	Margo Smith
18	14	See You on Sunday	Glen Campbell
2	2	She Never Knew Me	Don Williams
12	6	She'll Throw Stones at You	Freddie Hart
8	13	Show Me a Man	T. G. Sheppard
20	12	Silver Wings and Golden Rings	Billie Jo Spears
10	10	Since I Fell for You	Charlie Rich
14	11	Solitary Man	T. G. Sheppard
10	27	Somebody Hold Me (Until She Passes By)	Narvel Felts
9	5	Sometimes I Talk in My Sleep	Randy Cornor
5	37	Standing Room Only	Barbara Mandrell
4	13	Stranger	Johnny Duncan
13	33	Sun Comin' Up	Nat Stuckey
2	2	Suspicious Minds	Waylon Jennings and Jessi Colter
12	—	The Sweetest Gift	Linda Ronstadt and Emmylou Harris
7	—	Take My Breath Away	Margo Smith
18	—	Teardrops in My Heart	Rex Allen, Jr.
10	—	Thank God I've Got You	The Statler Brothers
11	—	That Look in Her Eyes	Freddie Hart
27	17	That'll Be the Day	Linda Ronstadt
16	27	That's What Friends Are For	Barbara Mandrell
7	2	That's What Made Me Love You	Bill Anderson and Mary Lou Turner
19	8	There Won't Be No Country Music (There Won't Be No Rock 'n' Roll)	C. W. McCall
21	14	Think Summer	Roy Clark
11	25	The Tracks of My Tears	Linda Ronstadt
29	10	Truck Drivin' Man	Red Steagall
7	4	Walk Softly	Billy "Crash" Craddock
5	3	What I've Got in Mind	Billie Jo Spears
6	5	When Something Is Wrong with My Baby	Sonny James
2	3	When the Tingle Becomes a Chill	Loretta Lynn
16	31	Whiskey Talkin'	Joe Stampley
22	13	Wichita Jail	Charlie Daniels
13	—	The Wild Side of Life	Freddy Fender
13	—	The Winner	Bobby Bare
13	16	Without Your Love (Mr. Jordan)	Charlie Ross
16	17	You Are So Beautiful	Ray Stevens
10	42	You Could Know as Much About a Stranger	Gene Watson
4	4	You Rubbed It in All Wrong	Billy "Crash" Craddock
3	3	You've Got Me to Hold On To	Tanya Tucker
13	19	Your Picture in the Paper	The Statler Brothers

==== Singles released by Canadian artists ====
US	CAN	Single	Artist
—	16	Baby Pictures	Chris Nielsen
82	13	Big Big World	Ronnie Prophet
—	19	Bobbie's Trains	Ron McLeod
—	11	Breaking Up with Brenda	Canadian Zephyr
—	9	California Dream	Colin Butler
19	5	The Call	Anne Murray
—	17	Did I Forget to Tell Her	Jerry Palmer
—	7	Feelin' Kinda Lucky Tonight	Ray Materick
—	13	Go Gently	Dianne Leigh
41	18	Golden Oldie	Anne Murray
—	3	Good Ol' Fashion Memories	Dick Damron
—	19	He Loves Me When He's Got the Time	Post Family
—	17	Honest Love	Ronnie Kartman
—	13	The Hooker	George Rowsell
—	19	I Wanna Be Bad	Julie Lynn
—	15	If You Don't Laugh	Hank Smith
—	11	Jesse	Patti MacDonnell
—	9	Let Me Do Something Lord	Blake Emmons
—	8	Lisa Mae	Orval Prophet
—	10	Lost in a Love Song	Christopher Ward
—	12	Lovin' You from a Distance	Mercey Brothers
—	15	Mama's Voice	R. Harlan Smith
—	15	Midnight Flight	The Good Brothers
—	12	Mornings Breaking Over California	Brian Austin
—	3	Mule Skinner Blues	Jerry Palmer
—	13	My Love for You	Newman Sisters
—	8	Not So Far Away	Donna Moon
—	20	Old Loves Never Die	Mercey Brothers
—	8	Outlaw Heroes	Roy Payne
—	9	Rainin' in My Heart	Ronnie Burla
—	15	Rusty Come Back	R. Harlan Smith
—	20	Sadie the Cleaning Lady	Carlton Showband
36	13	Shine On	Ronnie Prophet
—	20	That's the Kind of Man I Am	The Good Brothers
24	9	That's What I Get (For Doin' My Own Thinkin')	Ray Griff
22	10	Things	Anne Murray
—	19	Traveling Road Show Band	Tony White
—	13	Two of a Kind	Burton & Honeyman
—	15	Universal Girl	R. Harlan Smith
—	14	You Know I Want You	Chris Nielsen

== Top Albums ==
Album	Artist	Record Label
All I Can Do	Dolly Parton	RCA
Come on Over	Olivia Newton-John	MCA
Crystal	Crystal Gayle	United Artists
Crystal Lady	Olivia Newton-John	MCA
Dave & Sugar	Dave & Sugar	RCA
Don't Stop Believin'	Olivia Newton-John	MCA
Golden Ring	George Jones and Tammy Wynette	Epic
Harmony	Don Williams	ABC
Here's Some Love	Tanya Tucker	MCA
Hotel California	Eagles	Asylum
Lovin' and Learnin'	Tanya Tucker	MCA
One Piece at a Time	Johnny Cash	Columbia
Sometimes	Bill Anderson and Mary Lou Turner	MCA
The Sound in Your Mind	Willie Nelson	Columbia
Their Greatest Hits (1971-1975)	The Eagles	Asylum
The Troublemaker	Willie Nelson	Columbia
Wanted! The Outlaws	Waylon Jennings, Willie Nelson, Tompall Glaser and Jessi Colter	RCA
What I've Got in Mind	Billie Jo Spears	United Artists

=== Other new albums ===
Album	Artist	Record Label
2020 Vision	Ronnie Milsap	RCA
Alone Again	George Jones	Epic
The Best of Johnny Duncan	Johnny Duncan	Columbia
I'm Not Easy	Billie Jo Spears	United Artists
If You're Ever In Texas	Freddy Fender	ABC-Dot
Just For the Record	Ray Stevens	Warner Bros.
L. A. Sessions	Brenda Lee	MCA
Live	Ronnie Milsap	RCA
Lynn Anderson's Greatest Hits, Volume II	Lynn Anderson	Columbia
Mercy, Ain't Love Good	Jean Shepard	United Artists
Peanuts and Diamonds and Other Jewels	Bill Anderson	MCA
Rock 'n' Country	Freddy Fender	ABC-Dot
Song Bird	Margo Smith	Warner Bros.
Sunday Morning with Charley Pride	Charley Pride	RCA Victor
Thinkin' of a Rendezvous	Johnny Duncan	Columbia
This Is Barbara Mandrell	Barbara Mandrell	ABC-Dot
'Til I Can Make It on My Own	Tammy Wynette	Epic
Your Cheatin' Heart	Freddy Fender	ABC-Dot

== Births ==
- March 17 — Kiefer Thompson, of Thompson Square.
- June 18 — Blake Shelton, neotraditionalist of the 2000s.
- June 18 — busbee (born Michael Busbee), songwriter and producer of the 2010s. (died 2019)
- July 17 – Luke Bryan, singer-songwriter who rose to fame with songs like "Someone Else Calling You Baby" and "I Don't Want This Night to End".
- October 19 — Cyndi Thomson, female vocalist who enjoyed brief fame in the early 2000s.
- October 30 — Kassidy Osborn, member of SHeDAISY.
- November 26 — Joe Nichols, neotraditionalist of the 2000s.
- December 7 – Sunny Sweeney, female vocalist of the 2010s, with hits like "From a Table Away."

== Country Music Hall of Fame Inductees ==
- Paul Cohen (1908–1970)
- Kitty Wells (1919–2012)

== Major awards ==
=== Grammy Awards ===
- Best Female Country Vocal Performance — Elite Hotel, Emmylou Harris
- Best Male Country Vocal Performance — "(I'm a) Stand by My Woman Man", Ronnie Milsap
- Best Country Performance by a Duo or Group with Vocal — "The End is Not in Sight (The Cowboy Tune)", Amazing Rhythm Aces
- Best Country Instrumental Performance — Chester and Lester, Chet Atkins and Les Paul
- Best Country Song — "Broken Lady", Larry Gatlin (Performer: Larry Gatlin)

=== Juno Awards ===
- Country Male Vocalist of the Year — Murray McLauchlan
- Country Female Vocalist of the Year — Anne Murray
- Country Group or Duo of the Year — Mercey Brothers

=== Academy of Country Music ===
- Entertainer of the Year — Mickey Gilley
- Song of the Year — "Don't the Girls All Get Prettier at Closing Time", Baker Knight (Performer: Mickey Gilley)
- Single of the Year — "Bring It On Home to Me", Mickey Gilley
- Album of the Year — Gilley's Smoking, Mickey Gilley
- Top Male Vocalist — Mickey Gilley
- Top Female Vocalist — Crystal Gayle
- Top Vocal Duo — Conway Twitty and Loretta Lynn
- Top New Male Vocalist — Moe Bandy
- Top New Female Vocalist — Billie Jo Spears

=== Country Music Association ===
- Entertainer of the Year — Mel Tillis
- Song of the Year — "Rhinestone Cowboy", Larry Weiss (Performer: Glen Campbell)
- Single of the Year — "Good Hearted Woman", Waylon Jennings and Willie Nelson
- Album of the Year — Wanted! The Outlaws, Waylon Jennings, Willie Nelson, Tompall Glaser and Jessi Colter
- Male Vocalist of the Year — Ronnie Milsap
- Female Vocalist of the Year — Dolly Parton
- Vocal Duo of the Year — Waylon Jennings and Willie Nelson
- Vocal Group of the Year — The Statler Brothers
- Instrumentalist of the Year — Hargus "Pig" Robbins
- Instrumental Group of the Year — Roy Clark and Buck Trent

=== Hollywood Walk Of Fame ===
Country stars who got a star on the walk of fame in 1976

Johnny Cash

== Other links ==
- Country Music Association
- Inductees of the Country Music Hall of Fame
