= List of Hot Country Singles number ones of 1976 =

Johnny Cash reached number one in 1976 with the song "One Piece at a Time", about an assembly line worker who constructs his own car using stolen parts from a variety of different models. After the song became successful, an auto shop built the car described in the lyrics. Cash is pictured in the driving seat of the car.

Hot Country Songs is a chart that ranks the top-performing country music songs in the United States, published by Billboard magazine. In 1976, 37 different singles topped the chart, which at the time was published under the title Hot Country Singles, in 52 issues of the magazine. Chart placings were based on playlists submitted by country music radio stations and sales reports submitted by stores.

At the start of the year the song at the top of the chart was "Convoy" by C. W. McCall, its third week at number one. The song remained in the top spot until the issue of Billboard dated January 31, 1976, when it was replaced by "This Time I've Hurt Her More than She Loves Me" by Conway Twitty. "Convoy" also topped the magazine's all-genres singles chart, the Hot 100. It was one of three 1976 country number ones to capitalize on the prevailing fad for citizens band radio (CB), along with "The White Knight" by Cledus Maggard & the Citizen's Band and "Teddy Bear" by Red Sovine. CB also featured, to a lesser extent, in the song "One Piece at a Time", which was the final chart-topper for Country Music Hall of Famer and icon of the genre Johnny Cash.

C. W. McCall's total of four weeks at number one in 1976 was matched by Willie Nelson, who spent one week in the top spot with "If You've Got the Money I've Got the Time" and three with "Good Hearted Woman" in collaboration with Waylon Jennings, as well as by Tammy Wynette, who spent three weeks at number one with two solo singles and a further week at the top with "Golden Ring", a duet with her former husband George Jones. The couple had divorced the previous year, but nonetheless continued to record together. As well as Jennings, Conway Twitty, Marty Robbins and Red Sovine each spent three weeks at number one. Twitty was the only act to take three different singles to number one in 1976. Acts to top the chart for the first time in 1976 included novelty artist Cledus Maggard, who reached the number one position with his first ever Hot Country chart entry. He would go on to enter the listing with three more singles but his chart career ended in 1978, after which Maggard (real name Jay Huguely) would concentrate on the field of television production. Two female singers gained their first number ones via duets with established male vocalists: Mary Lou Turner with Bill Anderson and Helen Cornelius with Jim Ed Brown. Vocal group Dave & Sugar topped the chart for the first time with "The Door Is Always Open", the third version of the song to chart in less than three years, but by far the most successful.

== Chart history ==
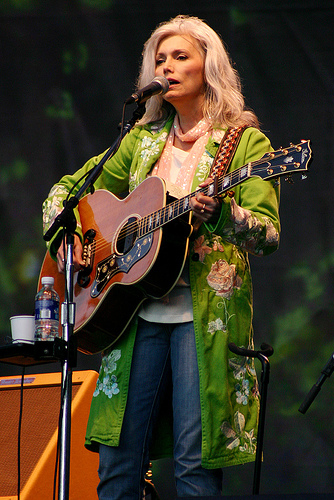
Emmylou Harris (pictured in 2005) had two number ones in 1976.

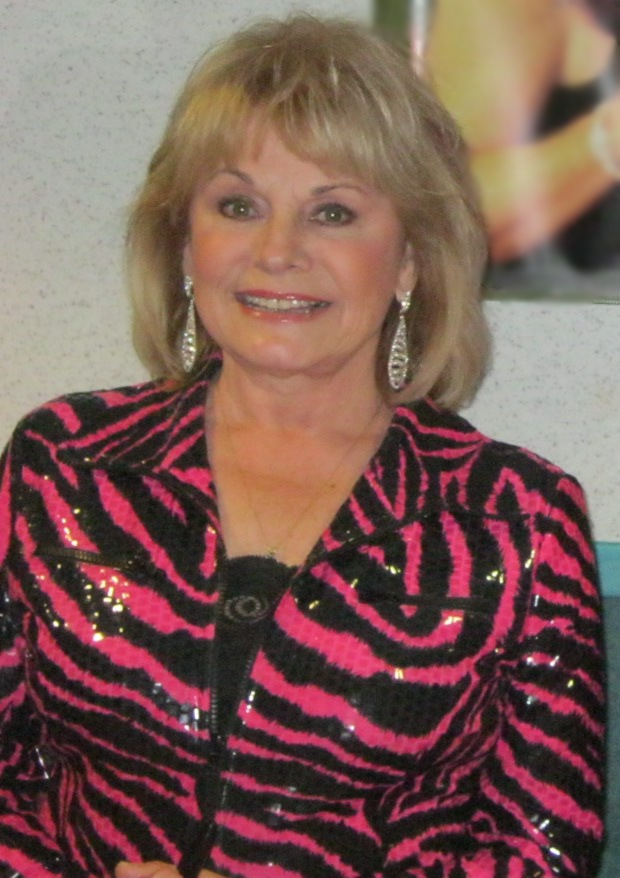
Helen Cornelius (pictured in 2012) achieved her only chart-topper with a duet with Jim Ed Brown.

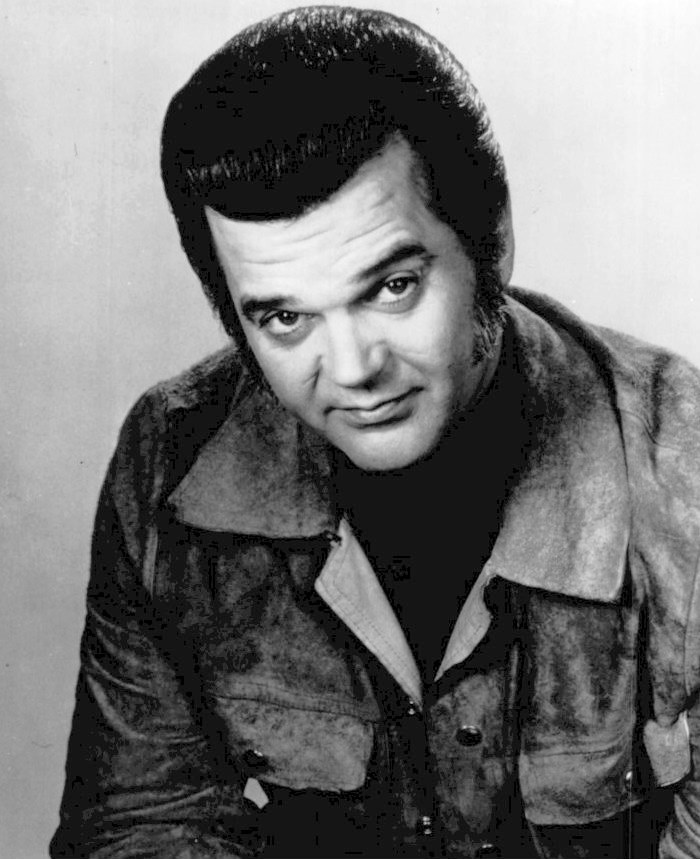
Conway Twitty was the only artist to have three number ones in 1976.

Issue date	Title	Artist(s)	Ref.
January 3	"Convoy"	C. W. McCall	
January 10	"Convoy"	C. W. McCall	
January 17	"Convoy"	C. W. McCall	
January 24	"Convoy"	C. W. McCall	
January 31	"This Time I've Hurt Her More than She Loves Me"	Conway Twitty	
February 7	"Sometimes"	Bill Anderson & Mary Lou Turner	
February 14	"The White Knight"	Cledus Maggard & the Citizen's Band	
February 21	"Good Hearted Woman"	Waylon & Willie	
February 28	"Good Hearted Woman"	Waylon & Willie	
March 6	"Good Hearted Woman"	Waylon & Willie	
March 13	"The Roots of My Raising"	Merle Haggard	
March 20	"Faster Horses (The Cowboy and the Poet)"	Tom T. Hall	
March 27	"'Til the Rivers All Run Dry"	Don Williams	
April 3	"You'll Lose a Good Thing"	Freddy Fender	
April 10	"'Til I Can Make It on My Own"	Tammy Wynette	
April 17	"Drinkin' My Baby (Off My Mind)"	Eddie Rabbitt	
April 24	"Together Again"	Emmylou Harris	
May 1	"Don't the Girls All Get Prettier at Closing Time"	Mickey Gilley	
May 8	"My Eyes Can Only See As Far As You"	Charley Pride	
May 15	"What Goes On When the Sun Goes Down"	Ronnie Milsap	
May 22	"After All the Good Is Gone"	Conway Twitty	
May 29	"One Piece at a Time"	Johnny Cash	
June 5	"One Piece at a Time"	Johnny Cash	
June 12	"I'll Get Over You"	Crystal Gayle	
June 19	"El Paso City"	Marty Robbins	
June 26	"El Paso City"	Marty Robbins	
July 3	"All These Things"	Joe Stampley	
July 10	"The Door Is Always Open"	Dave & Sugar	
July 17	"Teddy Bear"	Red Sovine	
July 24	"Teddy Bear"	Red Sovine	
July 31	"Teddy Bear"	Red Sovine	
August 7	"Golden Ring"	George Jones and Tammy Wynette	
August 14	"Say It Again"	Don Williams	
August 21	"Bring It On Home to Me"	Mickey Gilley	
August 28	"(I'm a) Stand by My Woman Man"	Ronnie Milsap	
September 4	"(I'm a) Stand by My Woman Man"	Ronnie Milsap	
September 11	"I Don't Want to Have to Marry You"	Jim Ed Brown and Helen Cornelius	
September 18	"I Don't Want to Have to Marry You"	Jim Ed Brown and Helen Cornelius	
September 25	"If You've Got the Money I've Got the Time"	Willie Nelson	
October 2	"Here's Some Love"	Tanya Tucker	
October 9	"The Games That Daddies Play"	Conway Twitty	
October 16	"You and Me"	Tammy Wynette	
October 23	"You and Me"	Tammy Wynette	
October 30	"Among My Souvenirs"	Marty Robbins	
November 6	"Cherokee Maiden"	Merle Haggard	
November 13	"Somebody Somewhere (Don't Know What He's Missin' Tonight)"	Loretta Lynn	
November 20	"Somebody Somewhere (Don't Know What He's Missin' Tonight)"	Loretta Lynn	
November 27	"Good Woman Blues"	Mel Tillis	
December 4	"Good Woman Blues"	Mel Tillis	
December 11	"Thinkin' of a Rendezvous"	Johnny Duncan	
December 18	"Thinkin' of a Rendezvous"	Johnny Duncan	
December 25	"Sweet Dreams"	Emmylou Harris	

== See also ==
- 1976 in music
- List of artists who reached number one on the U.S. country chart
