= Country Boy (Don Williams album) =

Studio album by Don Williams
- Released: September 13, 1977
- Genre: Country
- Label: ABC-Dot
- Producer: Don Williams

Don Williams chronology
Visions (1977)	Country Boy (1977)	Expressions (1978)

Singles from Country Boy
- 1. "I'm Just a Country Boy" Released: 1977; 2. "I've Got a Winner in You" Released: 1978; 3. "Rake and Ramblin' Man" Released: 1978

Country Boy is the seventh LP by American country singer-songwriter Don Williams. Released on September 13, 1977, on the ABC-Dot label, the album reached number 9 on the Billboard Country Albums chart. Country Boy was the second of two Don Williams albums released in 1977, along with Visions, which was released in January. Three singles were released from the album, and all three were top-10 country chart hits: "I'm Just a Country Boy" was released first in 1977, and was Williams' second consecutive number-one hit (following "Some Broken Hearts Never Mend"). The following two singles released in 1978 were "I've Got a Winner in You", which reached number seven, and "Rake and Ramblin' Man", which reached number three.

== Background ==
Don Williams spent the summer of 1977 touring in road shows with Jerry Jeff Walker, Waylon Jennings, and Emmylou Harris, and splitting his time recording in the studio. Willams produced the album himself, and contributed writing on some of the songs.

The single "I'm Just a Country Boy" was released in August 1977 in advance of the album, and in the Billboard review for the single it was described as:

Beautiful, soft arrangement of the old evergreen should take Williams back to No. 1 on the Hot Country Singles chart and perhaps establish him on the Hot 100 pop chart...instrumentation kept mainly in the background, focusing attention on the flawless Williams delivery.

The prediction was correct, and by the week before the release of the album, the single went from number 51 to number two on the Billboard Hot Country Singles chart. Williams' record label, ABC/Dot, developed a strategy to cross-market Williams to the US Pop market, and "I'm Just a Country Boy" was released to pop stations that played both country and rock music.

Shortly before the release of the Country Boy album, Don Williams was announced as a finalist for best male vocalist by the Country Music Association Awards. In October it was announced that Williams would also perform on the 11th annual CMA Awards, hosted by Johnny Cash.

Upon release of the album in September, he embarked on a short tour of England before returning to the US to play Las Vegas in November. Williams was especially popular in England and Europe in 1977, where he collected a gold and silver album awards for Visions, Harmony, and You're My Best Friend. The decision to market him to a mainstream American audience was in large part driven by his unexpected success in Europe.

== Track listing ==
from the original vinyl

Side A

1. "I'm Just a Country Boy" (Fred Hellerman, Marshall Barer) – 3:01
2. "Louisiana Saturday Night" (Bob McDill) – 2:20
3. "Overlookin' and Underthinkin'" (D. Lay, Don Williams, Joe Allen) – 3:26
4. "Sneakin' Around" (Bob McDill) – 2:40
5. "Look Around You" (Bill Joor, Buck Lindsey) – 2:55

Side B

1. "I've Got a Winner In You" (Don Williams, Wayland Holyfield) – 2:34
2. "Rake and Ramblin' Man" (Bob McDill) – 2:50
3. "Too Many Tears (To Make Love Strong)" (Jim Rushing) – 3:18
4. "It's Gotta Be Magic" (Don Williams) – 2:48
5. "Falling In Love" (Bob McDill, Wayland Holyfield) – 2:15

== Personnel ==
- Acoustic guitar – Bob McDill
- Acoustic guitar, electric guitar – Dave Kirby*, Jimmy Colvard
- String arranger, accordion, organ, piano, vibraphone – Charles Cochran
- Art direction – John Donegan
- Bass – Joe Allen
- Design – David Wright
- Drums, congas, percussion – Kenny Malone
- Electric piano, acoustic piano – Shane Keister
- Engineer, backing vocals – Garth Fundis
- Fiddle – Buddy Spicher
- Harp, electric guitar – Danny Flowers
- Illustration – Whole Hog Studios, LTD*
- Percussion [hand claps] – Jim Jerome
- Steel guitar, dobro – Lloyd Green
- Strings – Carl Gorodetzky, Gary Vanosdale, George Binkley, Lennie Haight, Marvin Chantry, Roy Christensen, Sheldon Kurland, Steven Maxwell Smith*, Wilfred Lehmann*
- Vocals, acoustic guitar, producer, backing vocals – Don Williams
- Recorded at Jack Clement Recording Studios
