= Jimmy Dean discography =

- Studio albums: 42
- Compilation albums: 7
- Singles: 65
- No.1 Single: 2

This article presents the discography of American country music singer, Jimmy Dean.

== Albums ==
=== 1950s–1960s ===
Title	Details	Peak positions	
Title	Details	US Country	US 200
Sings His Television Favorites	Release date: 1957; Label: Mercury Records	—	—
Jimmy Dean's Hour of Prayer	Release date: 1957; Label: Columbia Records	—	—
Bumming Around	Release date: 1959; Label: Mercury Records	—	—
Favorites of Jimmy Dean	Release date: 1960; Label: King Records	—	—
Hymns by Jimmy Dean	Release date: 1960; Label: Harmony Records	—	—
Big Bad John and Other Fabulous Songs and Tales	Release date: 1961; Label: Columbia Records	—	23
Portrait of Jimmy Dean	Release date: 1962; Label: Columbia Records	—	144
Everybody's Favorites	Release date: 1963; Label: Columbia Records	—	—
Golden Favorites	Release date: 1964; Label: Hilltop Records	—	—
Jimmy Dean Guest Star	Release date: 1964; Label: 4 Star Records	—	—
The Songs We All Love Best	Release date: 1964; Label: Columbia Records	—	—
Bummin' Around (with Johnny Horton)	Release date: 1965; Label: Starday Records	—	—
Jimmy Dean's Christmas Card	Release date: 1965; Label: Columbia Records	—	—
Sings His Television Favorites	Release date: 1965; Label: Wing Records	—	—
The First Thing Ev'ry Morning	Release date: 1965; Label: Columbia Records	1	—
Big Ones	Release date: 1966; Label: Columbia Records	—	—
Greatest Hits	Release date: 1966; Label: Columbia Records	22	—
Jimmy Dean Is Here!	Release date: 1966; Label: RCA Victor	10	—
Jimmy Dean Show	Release date: 1967; Label: RCA Victor	—	—
Most Richly Blessed	Release date: 1967; Label: RCA Victor	—	—
Mr. Country Music	Release date: 1967; Label: Harmony Records	—	—
Everybody's Favourite	Release date: 1967; Label: Hallmark Records	—	—
A Thing Called Love	Release date: 1968; Label: RCA Victor	20	—
Country's Favorite Son	Release date: 1968; Label: Harmony Records	—	—
Dean's List	Release date: 1968; Label: Columbia Records	—	—
Jimmy Dean Show	Release date: 1968; Label: RCA Victor	—	—
Gotta Travel On	Release date: 1969; Label: Harmony Records	—	—
Speaker of the House	Release date: 1969; Label: RCA Victor	—	—
"—" denotes releases that did not chart

=== 1970s–1980s ===
Title	Details	Peak positions
Title	Details	US Country
The Dean of Country Music	Release date: 1970; Label: RCA Victor	—
Country Boy and Country Girl (with Dottie West)	Release date: December 1970; Label: RCA Victor	42
Everybody Knows	Release date: 1971; Label: RCA Victor	41
These Hands	Release date: 1971; Label: RCA Victor	43
Bummin' Around	Release date: 1973; Label: Hilltop Records	—
I.O.U.	Release date: 1976; Label: Casino Records	—
Country Music Show 1954-55	Release date: 1981; Label: Castle Records	—
American Originals	Release date: 1989; Label: Columbia Records	—
"—" denotes releases that did not chart

=== 1990s–2000s ===
Title	Details
24 Greats	Release date: 1994; Label: Deluxe Records
Greatest Songs	Release date: 1995; Label: Curb Records
Jimmy Dean's Christmas Card	Release date: 1995; Label: Legacy Recordings
Inspirational Songs	Release date: 1998; Label: Curb Records
20 Great Story Songs	Release date: 1999; Label: Curb Records
The Complete Columbia Hits & More	Release date: 2004; Label: Collectors' Choice Music

== Singles ==
=== 1950s singles ===
Year	Single	Peak chart positions		Album
Year	Single	US Country	US	Album
1952	"Bumming Around"	5	—	Favorites by Jimmy Dean
1953	"The Queen of Hearts"	—	—	Favorites by Jimmy Dean
1954	"Release Me"	—	—	Favorites by Jimmy Dean
1955	"Big Blue Diamonds"	—	—	—N/a
1955	"Find 'Em, Fool 'Em, Leave 'Em Alone"	—	—	—N/a
1956	"Freight Train Blues"	—	—	Jimmy Deans Sings His Television Favorites
1956	"Hello Mr. Blues"	—	—	Jimmy Deans Sings His Television Favorites
1957	"Losing Game"	—	—	Jimmy Deans Sings His Television Favorites
1957	"Look on the Good Side"	—	—	Jimmy Deans Sings His Television Favorites
1957	"Deep Blue Sea"	—	67	—N/a
1957	"Little Sandy Sleightfoot"	—	32	—N/a
1958	"Bumming Around" (re-recording)	—	—	Jimmy Dean Sings His Television Favorites
1958	"Starlight, Starbright"	—	—	—N/a
1958	"What This Old World Needs"	—	—	Jimmy Dean Sings His Television Favorites
1958	"School of Love"	—	—	—N/a
1958	"Shark in the Bathtub"	—	—	—N/a
1959	"Weekend Blue"	—	—	—N/a
1959	"Bumming Around" (re-release)	—	106	Bumming Around
1959	"Counting Tears"	—	—	—N/a
1959	"Thanks for the Dream"	—	—	—N/a
"—" denotes releases that did not chart

=== 1960s singles ===
Year	Single	Peak chart positions						Album
Year	Single	US Country	US	US AC	CAN (CHUM)	CAN Country	UK	Album
1960	"Little Boy Lost"	—	—	—	—	—	—	—N/a
1961	"Give Me Back My Heart"	—	—	—	—	—	—	—N/a
1961	"Big Bad John" (b-side "I Won't Go Huntin' With You Jake" was #10 in Canada)	1	1	1	1	—	2	Big Bad John and Other Fabulous Songs and Tales
1961	"Oklahoma Bill"	—	—	—	—	—	—	Big Bad John and Other Fabulous Songs and Tales
1961	"Dear Ivan"	9	24	6	14	—	—	Jimmy Dean's Greatest Hits
1962	"The Cajun Queen"	16	22	4	25	—	—	Jimmy Dean's Greatest Hits
1962	"To a Sleeping Beauty"	15	26	6	—	—	—	Big Bad John and Other Fabulous Songs and Tales
1962	"PT-109" (b-side "Walk On Boy" was #28 in Canada)	3	8	2	33	—	—	Portrait of Jimmy Dean
1962	"Steel Men"	—	41	12	—	—	—	Portrait of Jimmy Dean
1962	"Little Black Book"	10	29	10	18	—	33	Portrait of Jimmy Dean
1962	"Gonna Raise a Ruckus Tonite"	—	73	—	36	—	—	—N/a
1963	"This Ole House"	—	128	—	—	—	—	Everybody's Favorite
1963	"Mile Long Train"	—	—	—	—	—	—	—N/a
1963	"The Funniest Thing I Ever Heard"	—	—	—	—	—	—	—N/a
1963	"Mind Your Own Business"	35	—	—	—	—	—	—N/a
1964	"Shenandoah"	—	—	—	—	—	—	The Songs We All Love Best
1964	"Sam Hill"	—	—	—	—	—	—	Jimmy Dean's Greatest Hits
1964	"Yes, Patricia, There Is a Santa Claus"	—	—	—	—	—	—	Jimmy Dean's Christmas Card
1965	"The First Thing Ev'ry Morning (And the Last Thing Ev'ry Night)"	1	91	19	—	—	—	The First Thing Ev'ry Morning
1965	"Harvest of Sunshine"	35	—	—	—	—	—	The First Thing Ev'ry Morning
1965	"Blue Christmas"	—	—	—	—	—	—	Jimmy Dean's Christmas Card
1966	"Things Have Gone to Pieces"	—	—	—	—	—	—	The Big Ones
1966	"Once a Day"	—	—	—	—	—	—	The Big Ones
1966	"Stand Beside Me"	10	—	—	—	—	—	Jimmy Dean Is Here
1967	"Sweet Misery"	16	—	13	—	—	—	The Jimmy Dean Show
1967	"Ninety Days"	41	—	—	—	—	—	—N/a
1967	"I'm a Swinger"	30	—	—	—	—	—	—N/a
1968	"A Thing Called Love"	21	—	—	—	14	—	A Thing Called Love
1968	"Born to Be by Your Side"	52	—	—	—	—	—	A Thing Called Love
1968	"A Hammer and Nails"	22	—	—	—	12	—	Mr. Country Music
1969	"A Rose Is a Rose Is a Rose"	52	—	—	—	—	—	A Thing Called Love
"—" denotes releases that did not chart

=== 1970s singles ===
Year	Single	Peak chart positions							Album
Year	Single	US Country	US	US AC	AUS	CAN Country	CAN	CAN AC	Album
1970	"When Judy Smiled"	—	—	—	—	—	—	—	Dean of Country Music
1970	"Us"	—	—	—	—	—	—	—	—N/a
1970	"Weakness in a Man"	—	—	—	—	—	—	—	—N/a
1971	"Everybody Knows"	54	—	—	—	—	—	—	Everybody Knows
1972	"Who Put the Leaving in Your Eyes"	—	—	—	—	—	—	—	Everybody Knows
1972	"The One You Say Good Morning To"	38	—	—	—	—	—	—	Everybody Knows
1973	"I'm Gonna Be Gone"	—	—	—	—	—	—	—	—N/a
1973	"The Days When Jim Liked Jenny"	—	—	—	—	—	—	—	—N/a
1973	"Your Sweet Love (Keeps Me Homeward Bound)"	90	—	—	—	—	—	—	—N/a
1976	"I.O.U"	9	35	47	18	38	30	3	I.O.U.
1976	"To a Sleeping Beauty" (re-recording)	85	—	—	—	—	—	—	I.O.U.
1976	"Angel in an Apron"	—	—	—	—	—	—	—	I.O.U.
1977	"I.O.U." (re-release)	90	—	—	—	—	—	—	I.O.U.
"—" denotes releases that did not chart

=== 1980s singles ===
Year	Single	Peak positions	Album
Year	Single	US Country	Album
1983	"I.O.U." (re-recording)	77	—N/a

== Other singles ==
=== Singles with Dottie West ===
Year	Single	Peak positions	Album
Year	Single	US Country	Album
1971	"Slowly"	29	Country Boy and Country Girl

=== Featured singles ===
Year	Single	Artist(s)	Peak positions	Album
Year	Single	Artist(s)	US Country	Album
1967	"Chet's Tune"	Some of Chet's Friends	38	—N/a
