= A Song in the Night =

A Song in the Night may refer to:

- "A Song in the Night" (song), a 1977 country song by Johnny Duncan
- A Song in the Night (album), a 1995 gospel album by Witness, or the title song
