= I'll Need Someone to Hold Me (When I Cry) =

Single by Janie Fricke

from the album I'll Need Someone to Hold Me When I Cry
- B-side: "It's Raining Too"
- Released: July 1981
- Genre: Country
- Length: 2:52
- Label: Columbia
- Songwriter(s): Bob McDill, Wayland Holyfield
- Producer(s): Jim Ed Norman

Janie Fricke singles chronology
"Pride" (1981)	"I'll Need Someone to Hold Me (When I Cry)" (1981)	"Do Me with Love" (1981)

"I'll Need Someone to Hold Me (When I Cry)" is a song written by Bob McDill and Wayland Holyfield, and originally recorded by Don Williams on his 1977 album Visions. The song was later recorded by American country music artist Janie Fricke. It was released in July 1981 as the third single and title track from her album I'll Need Someone to Hold Me When I Cry. The song reached #4 on the Billboard Hot Country Singles chart and #1 on the RPM Country Tracks chart in Canada.

== Charts ==
Chart (1981)	Peak position
US Hot Country Songs (Billboard)	4
Canadian RPM Country Tracks	1
