= Nice 'n' Easy (Johnny Duncan and Janie Fricke album) =

Studio album by Johnny Duncan and Janie Fricke
- Released: October 1980
- Recorded: 1975 – 1980
- Studio: Columbia Studio, Nashville, Tennessee
- Genre: Country
- Label: Columbia
- Producer: Larry Gatlin; Billy Sherrill

Johnny Duncan chronology
| In My Dreams (1980) | Nice 'n' Easy (1980) | You're on My Mind (1980) |

Janie Fricke chronology
| From the Heart (1979) | Nice 'n' Easy (1980) | I'll Need Someone to Hold Me When I Cry (1980) |

Singles from Nice 'n' Easy
- 1. "He's Out of My Life" Released: August 1980

Nice 'n' Easy is a duet studio album by American country music artists Johnny Duncan and Janie Fricke. It was released in October 1980 via Columbia Records and featured ten tracks. Five of these tracks were previously released and only credited to Duncan. Five of the remaining tracks were new recordings. It was the first and only collaborative album the pair would record together. It included one single, which was a cover of the pop recording "She's Out of My Life".

== Background and content ==
Both Johnny Duncan and Janie Fricke were signed to Columbia Records in the 1970s. Duncan found his biggest commercial success on the Columbia label with the help of producer Billy Sherrill who helped him craft a sound that produced the top ten songs "Thinkin' of a Rendezvous" and "It Couldn't Have Been Any Better". Fricke had been a background singer who was heard (uncredited) in the background of several Johnny Duncan songs. She received enough attention from these appearances that she signed her own Columbia contract in 1977.

Through their own recordings together, Duncan and Fricke would come to record their only studio album as a duo called Nice 'n' Easy. The album was recorded in sessions held at the Columbia Studio (located in Nashville, Tennessee) between 1975 and 1980. A total of ten tracks comprised Nice 'n' Easy. Five of the songs had been recorded and released previously: "Come a Little Bit Closer", "Stranger", "Thinkin' of a Rendezvous", "It Couldn't Have Been Any Better" and "Atlanta Georgia Stray". Originally these songs (some issued as singles) were credited to Duncan only. For Nice 'n' Easy, both artists received credit. These tracks were co-produced by Larry Gatlin and Billy Sherrill. The five remaining tracks were new recordings, produced solely by Sherrill. The lead track was a cover of Michael Jackson's "She's Out of My Life", which was retitled to "He's Out of My Life".

== Release, reception and singles ==
Nice 'n' Easy was released in October 1980 on the Columbia label. It was originally offered as a vinyl LP and a cassette. Both formats featured five selections on either side of the discs. The album received a positive response from Billboard magazine, who named it among its "Recommended LP's" in November 1980: "The mood throughout is sweet and undynamic: lots of light-hearted orchestrations honeyed up by strings and background harmonies." The album included the duo's single "He's Out of My Life". The song was issued on Columbia in August 1980. The single spent 14 weeks on the American Billboard Hot Country Songs chart, peaking at number 17 in September 1980. The track also reached Canada's RPM Country Songs chart where it also reached the top 20, peaking at number 20 in 1980.

== Track listing ==
Side one (LP and cassette versions)
| No. | Title | Writer(s) | Length |
|---|---|---|---|
| 1. | "He's Out of My Life" | Tom Bahler | 3:14 |
| 2. | "Nice 'n' Easy" | Lew Spence, Alan Bergman, Marilyn Bergman | 3:07 |
| 3. | "(I Believe) There's Nothing Stronger Than Our Love" | Paul Anka | 2:54 |
| 4. | "Baby (You've Got What It Takes)" | Clyde Otis, Mark Stein | 2:57 |
| 5. | "Loving Arms" | Tom Jans | 3:03 |

Side two (LP and cassette versions)
| No. | Title | Writer(s) | Length |
|---|---|---|---|
| 1. | "Come a Little Bit Closer" | Tommy Boyce, Bobby Hart, Wes Farrell | 3:12 |
| 2. | "It Couldn't Have Been Any Better" | Ray Griff | 3:00 |
| 3. | "Atlanta Georgia Stray" | Chris Gantry | 2:32 |
| 4. | "Thinkin' of a Rendezvous" | Bobby Braddock, Sonny Throckmorton | 3:22 |
| 5. | "Stranger" | Kris Kristofferson | 3:11 |

== Personnel ==
All credits are adapted from the liner notes of Nice 'n' Easy.

Technical personnel

- Lou Bradley – engineer
- Larry Gatlin – producer
- Ron Reynolds – producer
- Norman Seeff – photography
- Billy Sherrill – producer
- Virginia Team – art direction

== Release history ==
| Region | Date | Format | Label | Ref. |
|---|---|---|---|---|
| North America | October 1980 | Vinyl | Columbia Records | |
| North America | October 1980 | Cassette | Columbia Records | |
| United Kingdom | October 1980 | Vinyl | CBS Records International | |
