= Harmony (Don Williams album) =

Studio album by Don Williams
- Released: April 1976
- Studio: Jack Clement Recording (Nashville, Tennessee)
- Genre: Country
- Label: ABC
- Producer: Don Williams

Don Williams chronology
You're My Best Friend (1975)	Harmony (1976)	Visions (1977)

Singles from Harmony
- 1. "'Til All The Rivers Run Dry" Released: 1975; 2. "Say It Again" Released: 1976; 3. "She Never Knew Me" Released: October 1976

Harmony is the fifth studio album by American country music artist Don Williams. It was released in 1976 by ABC Records, and is his only album to have reached number one on the Top Country Albums chart. The singles, "Till the Rivers All Run Dry" and "Say It Again" reached number one on the US country singles chart, while "She Never Knew Me" peaked at number two.

== Content ==
Most of the songs on Harmony were written or co-written by Williams.

== Track listing ==
No.	Title	Writer(s)	Length
1.	"'Til the Rivers All Run Dry"	Wayland Holyfield, Don Williams	3:27
2.	"You Keep Coming 'Round"	Williams	2:45
3.	"Don't You Think It's Time"	Williams	3:22
4.	"I Don't Want the Money"	Williams	2:52
5.	"Where the Arkansas River Leaves Oklahoma"	Holyfield	4:02
6.	"Say It Again"	Bob McDill	2:56
7.	"Maybe I Just Don't Know"	Williams	3:00
8.	"Magic Carpet"	Larry Kingston, Frank Dycus	2:44
9.	"Time"	Michael Merchant	2:49
10.	"Ramblin'Instrumental" (Instrumental)	Williams	2:49
11.	"She Never Knew Me"	McDill, Holyfield	2:46

== Production ==
- All tracks produced by Don Williams
- Recorded at Jack Clement Recording Studios by Garth Fundis

== Personnel ==
from liner notes

- Joe Allen - electric and upright bass, background and harmony vocals
- Jimmy Colvard - electric guitar, acoustic guitar
- Danny Flowers - harmonica
- Garth Fundis - background and harmony vocals
- Lloyd Green - steel guitar, dobro
- Wayland Holyfield - background and harmony vocals
- Shane Keister - keyboards
- Kenny Malone - drums, conga, marimba
- Sharon Vaughn - harmony vocals
- Don Williams - lead and background vocals, acoustic guitar

String arrangements by Bill McElhiney. String productions by Don Williams and Jim Foglesong.

== Charts ==
=== Weekly charts ===
Chart (1976)	Peak position
US Top Country Albums (Billboard)	1

=== Year-end charts ===
Chart (1976)	Position
US Top Country Albums (Billboard)	8
