= My Big John =

Single by Dottie West
- B-side: "Men With Evil Hearts"
- Released: October 1961
- Genre: Country
- Length: 2:58
- Label: Starday
- Songwriter(s): J. Dean, Ira Louvin, Charlie Louvin, J. Newman

Dottie West singles chronology
| "I Should Start Running" (1961) | "My Big John" (1961) | "You Said I'd Never Love Again" (1962) |

"My Big John" is a song written by Jean Dean, Ira Louvin and Charlie Louvin of the Louvin Brothers, and J. Newman.

The song was recorded by American country music artist Dottie West, as an answer song to Jimmy Dean's hit "Big Bad John". It was released in October 1961 as her third release on Starday Records. The B-side is a track tilted, "Men With Evil Hearts"

== Song background ==
The song is told from the point of view of the "Cajun Queen" that drove John away – her search for him, then discovering about his death. The song follows the same format as "Big Bad John" except that the chorus intoning the title periodically is made up of male voices and is sung in a different key; unusually for "answer songs", the composer of the original - Jimmy Dean, in this case - is included in the songwriter credits.
