= Nice and Easy =

Nice and Easy, or Nice 'n' Easy, or similar, may refer to:

- Nice 'n' Easy, a 1960 album by Frank Sinatra
- Nice and Easy (album), a 1962 album led by American jazz vibraphonist Johnny Lytle
- Nice 'n' Easy (Johnny Duncan and Janie Fricke album), 1980 studio album by American country artists Johnny Duncan and Janie Fricke
- Nice 'n' Easy (Houston Person album), 2013
- "Nice and Easy" (Golden Girls episode), an episode of the American television show Golden Girls
- Nice 'n Easy (hair coloring), a shampoo-in permanent hair-coloring

== See also ==
- "Nice 'n' Sleazy", a 1978 song and single by The Stranglers
