= Visions (Don Williams album) =

Studio album by Don Williams
- Released: January 17, 1977
- Genre: Country
- Label: ABC/Dot
- Producer: Don Williams

Don Williams chronology
Harmony (1976)	Visions (1977)	Country Boy (1977)

Singles from Visions
- 1. "Some Broken Hearts Never Mend" Released: 1977

Visions is the sixth studio album by American country music singer-songwriter Don Williams. Released on January 17, 1977, on the ABC-Dot label, the album reached number four on the US Country Albums chart. "Some Broken Hearts Never Mend" was released as a single in 1977, reaching number one on the Billboard country singles chart. Visions was the first of two Don Williams albums released in 1977, along with Country Boy, which was released later.

== Background ==
Don Williams had achieved his first number-one country album the previous year with Harmony. For Visions, Williams was again at the writing and producing helm, and brought on many of the same musicians who had participated in all of his previous recordings, including Kenny Malone on drums and Danny Flowers on harmonica. Regular writing collaborators Wayland Holyfield, Allen Reynolds, and Bob McDill all made contributions to this album.

While Visions was a solid bestseller, it did not have its predecessor's chart success. However, along with Harmony and Country Boy, Visions is considered part of the trio of albums that marked the foundation of Williams' commercial and artistic success in the 1970s, both in the US and in the UK. ABC-Dot Records had made a concerted effort to market American country music abroad throughout the mid-1970s, and Williams' Visions was a notable bestseller overseas at the time, with more than 200,000 units moved.

Williams' was also becoming well known during this time for his intimate live performances, which featured his regular collaborators, Danny Flowers on harmonica and guitars, and David Williamson on bass.

== Track listing ==
from the original vinyl

No.	Title	Writer(s)	Length
1.	"Time On My Hands"	Layng Martine Jr.	2:31
2.	"I'll Forgive But I'll Never Forget"	Don Williams	2:59
3.	"I'm Getting Good at Missing You"	Wayland Holyfield	2:51
4.	"In The Mornin'"	Williams	2:16
5.	"Missing You, Missing Me"	Allen Reynolds, Williams	3:00
6.	"Some Broken Hearts Never Mend"	Holyfield	2:50
7.	"Fallin' in Love Again"	David Williamson	2:41
8.	"We Can Sing"	Williams	2:30
9.	"I'll Need Someone to Hold Me (When I Cry)"	Bob McDill, Holyfield	3:06
10.	"Expert At Everything"	Deoin Elijah Lay, Joe Allen	2:41
11.	"Cup O'Tea"	Harlan "HS" White	3:06

== Personnel ==
from the original release:

- Charles Cochran - accordion, organ, piano, vibraphone, string arrangements
- Jimmy Colvard - acoustic guitar, electric guitar
- Don Williams, Garth Fundis - backing vocals
- Joe Allen - bass
- Kenny Malone - drums, congas, percussion
- Shane Keister - electric piano, piano
- Buddy Spicher - fiddle
- Danny Flowers - harmonica, electric guitar
- Lloyd Green - steel guitar, dobro
- Don Williams - lead vocals, acoustic guitar

== Production ==
from the album liner notes:

- Producer – Don Williams
- Engineer [Recording] – Garth Fundis
- Design [Album] – David Wright
- Art Direction, Photography By – John Donegan

== Charts ==
=== Weekly charts ===
Chart (1977)	Peak position
Australia Albums (Kent Music Report)	98
US Top Country Albums (Billboard)	4

=== Year-end charts ===
Chart (1977)	Position
US Top Country Albums (Billboard)	16
