= Big Bad John =

Single by Jimmy Dean

Single by Jimmy Dean

from the album Big Bad John and Other Fabulous Songs and Tales
- B-side: "I Won't Go Huntin' With You Jake"
- Released: September 1961
- Recorded: August 18, 1961
- Studio: Bradley Film & TV Recording Studio, Nashville, Tennessee
- Genre: Country, talking blues
- Length: 3:00
- Label: Columbia
- Songwriter: Jimmy Dean
- Producer: Don Law

Jimmy Dean singles chronology
"Give Me Back My Heart" (1961)	"Big Bad John" (1961)	"Dear Ivan" (1962)

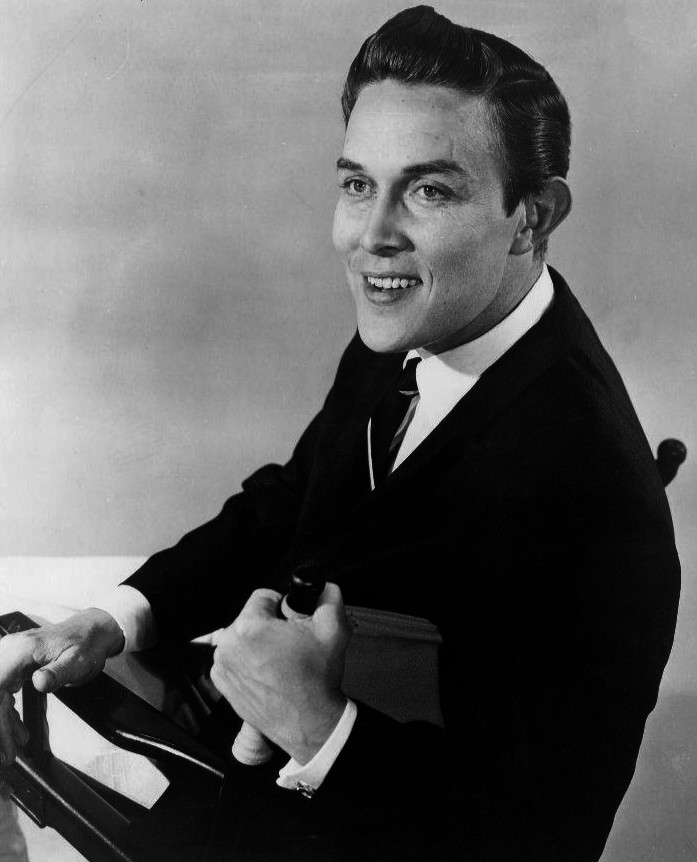
Jimmy Dean

"Big Bad John" is a country song written and originally performed by Jimmy Dean. It was released in September 1961 and by the beginning of November it had gone to number 1 on the Billboard Hot 100. It won Dean the 1962 Grammy Award for Best Country & Western Recording, and was nominated for the Grammy Award for Song of the Year.

The song and its sequels tell a story typical of American folklore, reminiscent of Paul Bunyan or John Henry. Big Bad John was also the title of a 1990 television movie starring Dean.

== Story ==
The song is about a mysterious and quiet miner who earns the nickname Big John because of his height, weight, and muscular physique – "He stood six foot six and weighed 245". He apparently hails from New Orleans, where, with "a crashin' blow from a huge right hand", he allegedly killed a man in a fight over a Cajun Queen.

One day, a support timber cracks at the mine where John works. The situation looks hopeless until John "grabbed a saggin' timber, gave out with a groan / and like a giant oak tree just stood there alone", then "gave a mighty shove", opening a passage and allowing the 20 other miners to escape. Just as men are about to re-enter with the tools necessary to save him, the mine fully collapses and John is believed dead. The mine itself is never reopened, but a marble stand is placed in front of it, with the words "At the bottom of this mine lies one hell of a man – Big John." (Some versions of the song change the last line to "lies a big, big man" to replace what was considered profane language.)

== Sequels ==
In October 1961, Dottie West recorded a sequel called "My Big John". This song is told from the point of view of the "Cajun Queen" that drove John away – her search for him, then discovering about his death.

Its 1962 sequel "The Cajun Queen" (written and performed by Dean), describes the arrival of "Queenie", Big John's Cajun Queen, who rescues John from the mine and marries him. Eventually, they have "110 grandchildren". This song's events are more exaggerated than the first, extending the story into the realm of tall tales. Queenie revives Big John by kissing his "cold blue lips, he started breathing," seemingly raising him from the dead. It may be seen as either an immediate sequel to the "My Big John" or a contradictory since John is rescued.

In June 1962, the story concludes with the arrival of "Little Bitty Big John", the flip side to "Steel Men" on Columbia 4-42483, learning about his father's act of heroism. This contradicts the previous sequel, "The Cajun Queen", since Big John's son has never met his father and the ending suggests he died in the mine and was never rescued or revived.

== Reception ==
In the US, "Big Bad John" spent five weeks at number 1 on the pop chart, two weeks on the country chart, and nine weeks on the Easy Listening chart. It was also a number 2 hit in the United Kingdom.

The song received a Grammy nomination for Record of the Year, while Dean's performance earned him a nomination for Best Male Solo Vocal Performance, and Dean won Grammy Award for Best Country & Western Recording.

Dean's LP Big Bad John and Other Fabulous Songs and Tales, where the song first appeared, reached number 23 in the pop charts. It was the B-side of "I Won't Go Huntin' with You Jake", but it ended up becoming much more popular than the latter.

The song frequently ranks as one of the best country songs of the 1960s, and of all time.

Nikki Sixx, of Mötley Crüe, has stated that "Big Bad John" was one of the songs he heard growing up that influenced him the most, along with "Helter Skelter" by the Beatles.

== Charts ==
Chart (1961)	Peak position
Canada - CHUM Hit Parade	1
New Zealand (Lever Hit Parade)	1
UK Singles Chart	2
US Billboard Hot 100	1
US Easy Listening (Billboard)	1
US Hot C&W Sides (Billboard)	1

== Certifications ==
Certifications for "Big Bad John"
Region	Certification	Certified units/sales
United States (RIAA)	Gold	1,000,000^{^}
^{^} Shipments figures based on certification alone.

== History ==
Columbia Records was considering dropping Dean before the release of this million-selling single, as he had not had a hit in years. Dean wrote the beginnings of "Big Bad John" on a flight from New York to Nashville because he realized he needed a fourth song for his recording session. Roy Acuff later helped him polish it.

The inspiration for the character of Big John was an actor, John Minto, whom Dean had met in a summer stock play, Destry Rides Again, who was 6 ft 5 in (196 cm). Dean would call him "Big John" and grew to like the rolling sound of the phrase.

Country pianist Floyd Cramer, who was hired to play piano on the song, came up with the idea to use a hammer and a piece of steel instead. This became a distinctive characteristic of the recording.

There are several known recordings of the song by Dean. Notably, there are two different versions of the inscription on the marble stand in front of the mine. The original, "At the bottom of this mine lies one hell of a man—Big John", was deemed too controversial, so in the version that was most often heard on the radio, one could hear "At the bottom of this mine lies a big, big man—Big John" instead. (However, a verse earlier in the song, "Through the smoke and the dust of this man-made hell..." remains intact in both versions, with no apparent controversy.)

The refrain was also used to end the Jimmy Dean song "PT-109", referring to John F. Kennedy.

== Parodies ==
There were multiple contemporary parodies of "Big Bad John". Cleveland DJ Phil McLean, had a minor hit about a cowardly character, "Small Sad Sam", which was released in December 1961. Country Yossi, an Orthodox Jewish composer and singer, spoofed it as "Big Bad Moish" on one of his children's albums. There were several gay-themed takes, such as Steve Greenberg's "Big Bruce", and Ben Colder's "Big Sweet John". The Barron Knights performed the song "Big Bad Bond" about Alan Bond and the America's Cup Challenge.

A French language translation was made in Quebec Canada and named "Gros Jambon" (Big Ham). It was done as a one-time novelty act by TV show host Réal Giguère but it caught the public's attention and was afterwards recorded by popular demand, selling over 300,000 copies.

In an episode of The Jimmy Dean Show, Dean and Rowlf the Dog performed a parody called "Big Bad Dog".

An Icelandic language version was written and performed by Guðmundur Jónsson, named "Jón tröll" (Jón ogre).

The song was used in a television advertisement for British supermarket chain Sainsbury's for their car insurance featuring a character named "Little Bill". It was also adapted for a series of television advertisements from Unilever starting in 1987 to promote Domestos. In the UK version of the advertisements, the chorus was changed to Big Bad Dom while in Germany, it was changed to Unser Dom ("Our Dom").

=== Political parodies ===
Political candidates have run advertisements that make use of "Big Bad John", retaining the music while substituting lyrics that support their particular political bids.

In Australia, a parody by John Vincent was released in September 1971 called "The Ballad of John Grey Gorton", with lyrics that dealt with Gorton's tenure as Prime Minister of Australia.

In Texas Senator John Cornyn's 2008 parody, he presented himself as a maverick politician, seeking a return to the Senate to fight to set things right. "You see I'm from Texas and we do things quick / And the way this place [the Senate] is run is about to make me sick", the advertisement states. Several advertisements were released by Democrats refuting some claims made in the song.

In the same year, the Democratic National Committee employed the song in an advertisement that targeted presidential candidate John McCain. The advertisement dubbed McCain "Exxon John", while highlighting $2 million in contributions by Exxon-Mobil to McCain's campaign, as well as the supposed role of Big Oil lobbyists in his campaign.

The song was also used in the closing credits of the UK politics show This Week, whenever the show discussed the former Speaker of the House of Commons, John Bercow. It was used to humorous effect due to Bercow's short stature and perceived weak control in Parliament.

== See also ==
- Ringo (Lorne Green song): A popular country recording by Lorne Greene that uses the same spoken word format.
