= She Never Knew Me =

Single by Don Williams

from the album Harmony
- B-side: "Ramblin'"
- Released: October 16, 1976
- Genre: Country
- Length: 2:47
- Label: ABC/Dot
- Songwriter(s): Bob McDill, Wayland Holyfield
- Producer(s): Don Williams

Don Williams singles chronology
"Say It Again" (1976)	"She Never Knew Me" (1976)	"Some Broken Hearts Never Mend" (1977)

"She Never Knew Me" is a song written by Bob McDill and Wayland Holyfield, and recorded by American country music artist Don Williams. It was released in October 1976 as the third single from the album Harmony. The song reached number two on the Billboard Hot Country Singles and Tracks chart.

== Chart performance ==
Chart (1976)	Peak position
US Hot Country Songs (Billboard)	2
US Bubbling Under Hot 100 (Billboard)	3
Canadian RPM Country Tracks	2
