= George McCurn =

American gospel musician (1920–1985)

- Born: January 21, 1920; Chicago, Illinois, U.S.
- Died: April 1985 (aged 64–65) Los Angeles, California, U.S.
- Genres: Soul, gospel
- Occupation: Singer
- Label: A&M

George McCurn (born January 21, 1920 – April 1985) was an American bass singer who started off singing gospel and switched to pop in the 1960s. He had a hit in 1963 with "I'm Just a Country Boy".

== Career ==
=== Group ===
In 1948, he joined the vocal quartet Kings of Harmony, replacing their bass singer Isaac "Dickie" Freeman. In the early days he was also a member for a brief period of West Coast-based group the Gospel Harps. In 1950, he joined Fairfield Four and replaced Isaac Freeman who had previously replaced in Kings of Harmony. In October 1950, he recorded with the group and this marks the period of his first time recording. In 1954, he joined the Pilgrim Travellers, replacing their original bass singer, Rafael Taylor. At one stage when he was in the Pilgrim Travellers, the other members at the time were Jesse Whittaker, Ernest Booker, Louis Rawls, and J.W. Alexander.

=== Solo ===
1960s

In early 1963, he had his I'm Just a Country Boy single released on A&M Records. It was listed in the February 23 issue of Billboard as a regional breakout single which though at that time, not on the Billboard Hot 100, but selling strongly. By April 6, the single had climbed from 64 in the Hot 100 to 56.

His album Country Boy Goes to Town was a special merit pick in the June 1 edition of Billboard. It was reported in the June 29 edition of Billboard, following Festival Records exec director Frederick C. Marks signing a 5-year deal with A&M, the album was going to be rush released in Australia.

In March 1964, the single "Guess Who" which was written by JoAnn Belvin was released. It was backed with "One More Time For The Poor Man", which was written by Sonny Knight and Thora Johnson. "Guess Who" also appeared on the Vault Records label with the cat no V.R. 002. The other side "At The Of A Rainbow" had the cat no V.R. 001., which indicates that it was probably the B side.

In 1966, the single "Too Many Tears" bw ": You Say You Don't Want Me" was released on Reprise.

1970s

In later years McCurn did some recording session work as a backing vocalist. Along with Delia Gartnell, Gwenn Roberts, and Herman Hitson, he was one of the backing vocalist on the Truth album by King Hannibal, released in 1973. He was also one of the backing vocalists on Ry Cooder's Paradise and Lunch album which was released on Reprise Records in 1974.

In 1976, "Satchmo" bw "Old LA" was released on the Star-Brite label.

== Personal life ==
McCurn died in Los Angeles in 1985, aged 65.

== Discography ==
US Singles
Title	Release info	Year	Notes
"Your Daughter's Hand" / "The Time Has Come"	Liberty 55418	1962	
"I'm Just A Country Boy" / "In My Little Corner Of The World"	A&M 705	1963	
"Please Send Me Someone To Love" / "How's The World Treating You"	A&M 715	1963	
"When The Wind Blows (In Chicago)" / "Georgia Town"	A&M 726	1963	
"Guess Who" / "I've Got To Move"	A&M 731	1964	
"Well" / "Clap Your Hands"	A&M 741	1964	
"Your Friend" / "While The Bloom Is On The Rose"	A&M 748	1964	
"As Tears Go By" / "Georgia Town"	A&M 759	1965	
"You Say You Don't Want Me" / "Too Many Tears"	Reprise 0479	1966	
"Satchmo" / "Old LA"	Star-Brite IRDA 2048	1976	
"Guess Who" / "At The End (Of A Rainbow)"	Vault Records V.R. 001	19?	

EP
Title	Side A	Side B	Release info	Year	Notes
I'm Just A Country Boy	1. "I'm Just A Country Boy"; 2. "In My Little Corner Of The World"	1. "The End"; 2. "Goodnight, My Love, Pleasant Dreams"	Festival FK-331	1963	Australian release

Album
Title	Release info	Year	Notes
Country Boy Goes to Town	A&M LP 102	1963	
