= The First Thing Ev'ry Morning =

Studio album by Jimmy Dean and the Chuck Cassey Singers
- Released: 1965
- Genre: Country
- Length: 29:51
- Label: Columbia Records
- Producer: Lor Crane

Jimmy Dean and the Chuck Cassey Singers chronology
Sings His Television Favorites (1965)	The First Thing Ev'ry Morning (1965)	Big Ones (1966)

Singles from Loving You Beats All I've Ever Seen
- 1. "The First Thing Ev'ry Morning (And the Last Thing Ev'ry Night)" Released: April 1965; 2. "Harvest of Sunshine" Released: 1965

Professional ratings
Review scores
Source	Rating
AllMusic	3/5 stars

The First Thing Ev'ry Morning is the fifteenth studio album by American country music artist Jimmy Dean alongside his backing band, the Chuck Cassey Singers. The album was released in 1965, via Columbia Records. It was produced by Lor Crane.

== Track listing ==
Side 1
No.	Title	Writer(s)	Length
1.	"The First Thing Ev'ry Morning (And the Last Thing Ev'ry Night)"	Jimmy Dean; Ruth Roberts	2:07
2.	"Under the Sun"	Joe Shapiro; Lou Stallman	2:29
3.	"Dear Heart"	Ray Evans; Jay Livingston; Henry Mancini	3:10
4.	"Too Many Times"	Joel Herron	2:22
5.	"Someday (You'll Want Me to Want You)"	Jimmie Hodges	2:40
6.	"Shutters and Boards"	Audie Murphy; Scott Turner	2:30

Side 2
No.	Title	Writer(s)	Length
1.	"Any Time"	Herbert Lawson	2:12
2.	"'Till Tomorrow"	Jerry Bock; Sheldon Harnick	2:20
3.	"Where Were You When I Needed You"	Marvin Moore; Bernie Wayne	2:30
4.	"All by Myself"	Irving Berlin	2:28
5.	"Put On Your Old Grey Bonnet"	Percy Wenrich	3:20
6.	"Harvest of Sunshine"	Dean; Bill Katz; Roberts	1:43
Total length:			29:51

== Charts ==
Weekly chart performance for The First Thing Ev'ry Morning
Chart (1965)	Peak position
US Top Country Albums (Billboard)	1
