= She Can Put Her Shoes Under My Bed (Anytime) =

Single by Johnny Duncan

from the album The Best Is Yet to Come
- B-side: "Maybe I Just Crossed My Mind"
- Released: February 1978
- Genre: Country
- Label: Columbia
- Songwriter(s): Aaron Schroeder; Bob Halley
- Producer(s): Billy Sherrill

Johnny Duncan singles chronology
"Come a Little Bit Closer" (1977)	"She Can Put Her Shoes Under My Bed (Anytime)" (1978)	"Hello Mexico (And Adios Baby to You)" (1978)

"She Can Put Her Shoes Under My Bed (Anytime)" is a song written by Aaron Schroeder and Bob Halley, and recorded by American country music artist Johnny Duncan. It was released in February 1978 as the first single from the album The Best Is Yet to Come. "She Can Put Her Shoes Under My Bed (Anytime)" was the third and final number one on the country chart for Johnny Duncan. The single stayed at number one for one week and spent a total of ten weeks on the country chart.

== Chart performance ==
Chart (1978)	Peak position	
US Hot Country Songs (Billboard)	1	1
Canadian RPM Country Tracks	1	
