= I'm Just a Country Boy =

Single by Don Williams

from the album Country Boy
- B-side: "It's Gotta Be Magic"
- Released: August 1977
- Genre: Country
- Length: 3:07
- Label: Dot
- Songwriters: Fred Hellerman; Marshall Barer
- Producer: Don Williams

Don Williams singles chronology
"Some Broken Hearts Never Mend" (1977)	"I'm Just a Country Boy" (1977)	"I've Got a Winner in You" (1978)

"I'm Just a Country Boy" is a song written by Fred Hellerman and Marshall Barer. In 1954, the song was recorded by Harry Belafonte accompanied by Hugo Winterhalter And His Orchestra (RCA Victor) and released on 78 rpm and 45 rpm record. It was the B-side of the record, "Hold 'Em Joe" (Calypso) being the A-side. The print on the record informs us that the song was written by Fred Brooks and Marshall Barer, noting that Fred Brooks was a pseudonym for Fred Hellerman (of The Weavers fame) who was blacklisted in the McCarthy era for his socialist ideals.

== Cover versions ==
- In 1960 Sam Cooke recorded the song as the second track on his album Swing Low.
- In 1962 Steve Camacho released the song on the album "Folk and other songs" with the title "Turtle Dove".
- Bobby Vinton covered the song on his 1966 LP Country Boy.
- In 1967, Julie Felix' version "I'm Just A Country Girl" appeared on EP "Songs from the Frost Report, Part 2" (Fontana). Also in this case Fred Brooks and Marshall Barer were identified as the creators of the song.
- The Hager Twins, Jim and John, included the song on their 1972 album Music On The Countryside.
- American country music artist Don Williams released his version in July 1977 as the first single from the album Country Boy. "I'm Just a Country Boy" was Don Williams' seventh number one on the country chart. The single stayed at number one for one week and spent a total of eleven weeks on the country chart.
- Richard Manuel of The Band recorded the song in 1985. It was one of his last recordings before his death, and was released posthumously as "Country Boy" on The Band's 1993 album Jericho.
- In 2007, the song was included in Alison Krauss' CD A Hundred Miles or More: A Collection (Rounder) as "You're Just a Country Boy". In the booklet that comes with the CD, Fred Hellerman and Marshall Barer are given the credits for the song. The text of the booklet indicates unawareness of recorded versions before Don Williams'.
- Other known versions are: George McCurn - March 16 1963, Jim Ed Brown - 1965, Ronnie Lane - 1975; Jimmie Rodgers (pop singer); Jim Croce (demo); Roger Whittaker; David Ball; John Holt; The Brothers Four; Bobby Vinton.
- 60s pop icon Bobby Vee recorded the song in his final sessions, released in 2014 as The Adobe Sessions

== Chart performance ==
Chart (1977)	Peak position
US Hot Country Songs (Billboard)	1
US Bubbling Under Hot 100 (Billboard)	110
Canadian RPM Country Tracks	1
