= It Couldn't Have Been Any Better =

Single by Johnny Duncan

from the album Johnny Duncan
- B-side: "Denver Woman"
- Released: January 1977
- Recorded: November 1976
- Genre: Country
- Length: 3:04
- Label: Columbia 10474
- Songwriter(s): Ray Griff
- Producer(s): Billy Sherrill and Larry Gatlin

Johnny Duncan singles chronology
"Thinkin' of a Rendezvous" (1976)	"It Couldn't Have Been Any Better" (1977)	"A Song in the Night" (1977)

"It Couldn't Have Been Any Better" is a country music song written by Ray Griff, and made famous by Johnny Duncan.

One of several Duncan singles to feature session vocalist Janie Fricke on harmony vocals, "It Couldn't Have Been Any Better" was his second No. 1 song to top the Billboard Hot Country Singles chart, doing so in April 1977. The single week atop the country chart was part of an 11-week run in the top 40.

Although the last Duncan-Fricke duet to top the charts — the previous song, "Thinkin' of a Rendezvous," went No. 1 just before Christmas 1976 — the two enjoyed several more duet hits, most notably "Come a Little Bit Closer" in January 1978 (a cover of the Jay and the Americans).

== Charts ==
=== Weekly charts ===
Chart (1977)	Peak position
US Hot Country Songs (Billboard)	1
Canadian RPM Country Tracks	1

=== Year-end charts ===
Chart (1977)	Position
US Hot Country Songs (Billboard)	14
