= She's Out of My Life =

1980 single by Michael Jackson

- UK/European single picture sleeve

Single by Michael Jackson

from the album Off the Wall
- B-side: "Get on the Floor" (US); "Push Me Away" (UK); "It's the Falling in Love" (Aus)
- Released: April 1, 1980
- Recorded: December 1978
- Genre: Orchestral pop; soft rock; adult contemporary
- Length: 3:37
- Label: Epic
- Songwriter: Tom Bahler
- Producer: Quincy Jones

Michael Jackson singles chronology
| "Off the Wall" (1979) | "She's Out of My Life" (1980) | "Girlfriend" (1980) |

Music video
- "She's Out of My Life" on YouTube

Alternative release
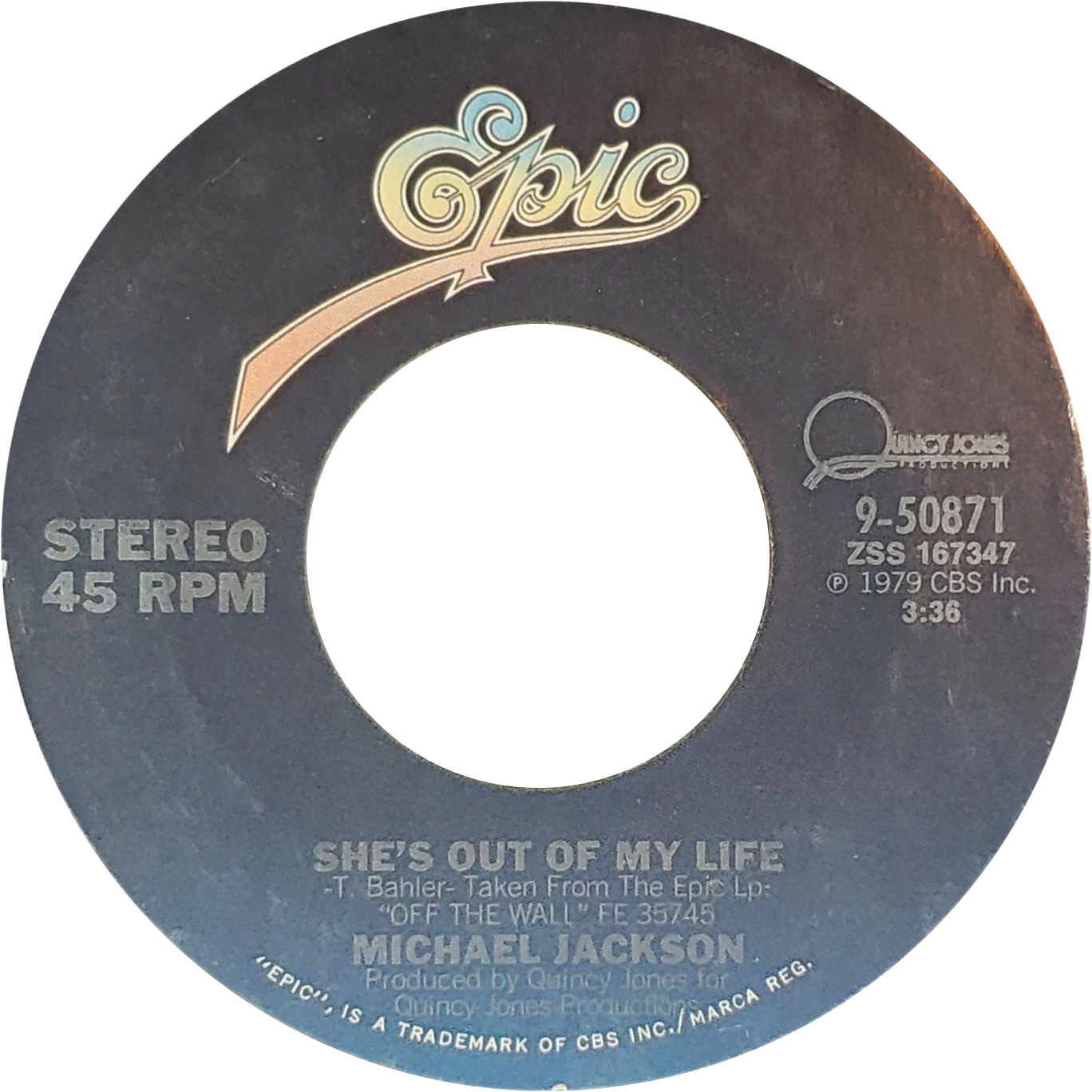
- Side A of the US single

"She's Out of My Life" is a song written by American songwriter Tom Bahler and performed by American singer Michael Jackson. The song was released April 1, 1980 as the fourth single from Jackson's 1979 album Off the Wall. In 2004, the song appeared in The Ultimate Collection. It peaked at No. 10 on the Billboard Hot 100, marking the first time any solo artist had ever achieved four Top 10 hits from one album. In America, it earned a million-selling Platinum certification.

The demo version of the song, which features Jackson singing with a guitar, was released on the second disc of the 2009 album Michael Jackson's This Is It.

== Background ==
Unlike the album's previous singles, which are all uptempo dance-oriented funk and disco songs, "She's Out of My Life" is an emotional ballad. The song has a tempo of 66 beats per minute, making it one of Jackson's slowest songs.

Bahler conceived the song while driving on the freeway on a Thursday in 1977. The following day, he offered the song to ATV Music Publishing, which was ambivalent toward producing a ballad. In response, Bahler presented the song to music producer Snuff Garrett, who immediately agreed to co-publish the song and planned to produce it the following week with Bahler's suggested performer, Frank Sinatra. On Saturday, producer Quincy Jones called Bahler to inquire about new music. After hearing Bahler perform the song eight times in a row, Jones convinced Bahler to break his agreement with Garrett by allowing Bahler to co-produce the song with him. Bahler backed out of the previous agreement by giving Garrett a third of the song's future publishing revenues, only to then discover that Jones did not yet have an artist lined up for it.

After working with Jackson on The Wiz, Jones suggested that he produce Jackson's upcoming album by offering "She's Out of My Life" as record material. Jackson loved the song, referring to it as "the single." However, Bahler had veto power over who could perform the song, and he felt it should go to somebody with more life experience. Jones persuaded Bahler by telling him that the song would give Jackson "adult emotions."

The song is about a painful breakup. It has been claimed that Bahler wrote the song about Karen Carpenter, whom Bahler had briefly dated. However, he has stated, "The fact is, I had already written that song by the time Karen and I became romantic. That song was written more about Rhonda Rivera... Rhonda and I had been together for two years, and it was after we broke up that I started dating Karen."

== Production ==
Jones wanted Jackson to record material with more mature themes and "feel the full range of his voice," so he decided to bring the song to Jackson's attention.

In the second-to-last verse (preceding the final repetition of "She's out of my life"), the song lyric was originally "Instead of being my wife." However, Jackson couldn't yet relate to marriage at his young age, so Bahler accepted Jackson's suggestion to instead repeat the lyric "And it cuts like a knife."

A poignant moment in the song occurs near the end when Jackson begins to break down in tears as he sings the final line. Although he had attempted to record the song's last few moments with emotional restraint, after numerous tries he continued to end the rendition the same—by breaking down in tears. Jones subsequently let Jackson's tearful recording stand:

"She's Out of My Life", I'd been carrying around for about three years—you can feel the pain in it, you know. And I held on to it and finally something said 'this is the right moment to give it to Michael'.

And when we recorded it with Michael, I know it was an experience he'd never even thought about to sing in a song, 'cause it's a very mature emotion. And he cried at the end of every take, you know. We recorded about—I don't know—8–11 takes, and every one at the end, he just cried, and I said 'hey—that's supposed to be, leave it on there.'

—Quincy Jones, Off the Wall 2001 Special Edition, Quincy Jones Interview 3

Jackson apologized to Jones and Bruce Swedien following the emotional recording, but they said that there was "no need to".

In Jackson's autobiography, Moonwalk, he wrote that the song is about knowing that barriers separating him from others are seemingly easy to overcome, yet they cause him to miss out on what he really desires. He said that he cried from the sudden effect of the words because "I had been letting so much build up inside me." Particularly it reminded him of his feeling of being "so rich in some experiences while being poor in moments of true joy." He worried about this feeling showing up on the song, but also felt "if it touched people's heartstrings, knowing that would make me feel less lonely." He described making Off the Wall as "one of the most difficult periods of my life... I had very few close friends at the time and felt very isolated." He would walk through his neighborhood, hoping to meet people who didn't know who he was, so he could meet "somebody who would be my friend because they liked me and needed a friend too, not because I was who I am."

Bahler said that he received a call from Jackson’s father Joseph, who told Bahler he would only allow the song to be on the album if the publishing rights were given to him. However, when Jones called Joseph thereafter to inform him that the song would be taken off since the publishing was not available, Joseph denied having made such demands and told them to include it anyway.

== Release and reception ==
The song peaked at number 10 in the United States on the Billboard Hot 100. It peaked at number 3 on the UK charts.

=== Critical reception ===
AllMusic editor Stephen Thomas Erlewine called the song an "overwrought ballad" but praised Jackson's "blindingly gifted" singing on the track. Rolling Stone editor Stephen Holden praised: "The singer's ultradramatic phrasing, which takes huge emotional risks and wins every time, wrings the last drop of pathos from Tom Bahler's tear-jerker, "She's Out of My Life." Cash Box said it has a "feathery, symphonic opening, muted keyboard work and tearful vocal reading."

== Music video ==
A music video was produced to promote the song, which showed Michael in a blue-green shirt, dark pants, and sitting on a barstool with a spotlight shining behind him. The video uses a split screen technique to simultaneously show Jackson from two different angles during the second and third verses. It was directed by Bruce Gowers, who also directed a similar video for Jackson's previous single "Rock with You". The video is shown far less frequently than Jackson's later videos, but it is included on the DVD box set Michael Jackson's Vision, marking its first DVD release.

== Live performances ==
The song was performed during the Jacksons' Triumph Tour and Victory Tour. It was also performed on Jackson's Bad tour, the Dangerous World Tour, and the Royal Brunei concert, which also turned out to be the final live performance of the song, as whilst it was rehearsed for the HIStory World Tour, it was removed from the setlist just before the tour began. The song was also rehearsed as a duet with a female backup vocalist for the first "Michael Jackson & Friends" charity concert in Seoul, South Korea, but cancelled for the final performance, which took place ten years to the day before Jackson's death.

Usually during these performances, Jackson would replace the line "it's out of my hands" with "it's...can I come down there?" He would then bring a female audience member up on stage with him while performing the song or sitting on the edge of the stage and lying down on it while singing the song to the audience. Before concluding the song by singing the final word "life", he would often pause briefly to physically display distress, which he amplified by shielding his face and acting as if he were crying. He would also do that gesture near the end of I'll Be There during The Jackson 5 Medley.

The live performances of the song were featured on the Live in Bucharest: The Dangerous Tour and Live at Wembley July 16, 1988 DVDs. Live audio is available in the Live at Wembley July 16, 1988 CD, included as a bonus on Bad 25, and the 1981 live album, The Jacksons Live!

== Track listing ==
=== US single ===
1. "She's Out of My Life" – 3:38
2. "Get on the Floor" – 4:40

== Personnel ==
- Written and composed by Tom Bahler
- Produced by Quincy Jones
- Recorded and mixed by Bruce Swedien
- Lead vocal by Michael Jackson
- Bass: Louis Johnson
- Guitar: Larry Carlton
- Rhodes piano: Greg Phillinganes
- String arrangement by Johnny Mandel
- Concert master: Gerald Vinci

== Charts ==
=== Weekly charts ===
1980 weekly chart performance for "She's Out of My Life"
| Chart (1980) | Peak position |
|---|---|
| Australia (Kent Music Report) | 17 |
| Canada Top Singles (RPM) | 15 |
| Ireland (IRMA) | 4 |
| Netherlands (Single Top 100) | 13 |
| Netherlands (Dutch Top 40) | 19 |
| New Zealand (Recorded Music NZ) | 6 |
| UK Singles (Official Charts) | 3 |
| US Billboard Hot 100 | 10 |
| US Billboard Adult Contemporary | 4 |
| US Billboard Hot Soul Singles | 43 |
| US Cash Box Top 100 | 14 |
| US Radio & Records CHR/Pop Airplay Chart | 10 |

2009 weekly chart performance for "She's Out of My Life"
| Chart (2009) | Peak position |
|---|---|
| Netherlands (Single Top 100) | 57 |
| Switzerland (Schweizer Hitparade) | 97 |
| UK Singles (Official Charts) | 88 |

=== Year-end charts ===
Year-end chart performance for "She's Out of My Life"
| Chart (1980) | Position |
|---|---|
| Australia (Kent Music Report) | 162 |
| New Zealand (Recorded Music NZ) | 48 |
| UK (Official Charts Company) | 61 |
| US Billboard Hot 100 | 65 |
| US Cash Box Top 100 | 94 |

== Certifications ==
Certifications for "She's Out of My Life"
| Region | Certification | Certified units/sales |
|---|---|---|
| United Kingdom (BPI) | Silver | 500,000 |
| United States (RIAA) | Platinum | 1,000,000^{‡} |
^{‡} Sales+streaming figures based on certification alone.

== Johnny Duncan and Janie Fricke version ==
"He's Out of My Life"

Single by Johnny Duncan and Janie Fricke

from the album Nice 'n' Easy
- B-side: "Loving Arms"
- Released: August 1980
- Recorded: May 1980
- Studio: Columbia Studio
- Genre: Country
- Length: 3:14
- Label: Columbia
- Songwriter: Tom Bahler
- Producer: Billy Sherrill

Johnny Duncan singles chronology
| "I'm Gonna Love You Tonight (In My Dreams)" (1980) | "He's Out of My Life" (1980) | "Acapulco" (1980) |

Janie Fricke singles chronology
| "Pass Me By (If You're Only Passing Through)" (1980) | "He's Out of My Life" (1980) | "Down to My Last Broken Heart" (1980) |

=== Background and recording ===
"She's Out of My Life" was notably covered as a duet by American country music artists Johnny Duncan and Janie Fricke. For the duet, the song was re-titled to "He's Out of My Life". The pair began recording together when Fricke appeared as a background vocalist on several of Duncan's late 1970s country hits. Her uncredited background vocals led to her own contract with Duncan's label (Columbia Records). In 1980, Duncan and Fricke went into the studio to record their first studio album as a duet pair. Their sessions that year also included "He's Out of My Life". It was recorded at the Columbia Studio, located in Nashville, Tennessee. The session took place in May 1980 and was produced by Billy Sherrill.

=== Release and chart performance ===
In August 1980, "She's My Out of My Life" was released as a single on Columbia Records, crediting both Duncan and Fricke. The single spent 14 weeks on the American Billboard Hot Country Songs chart, peaking at number 17 in September 1980. The track also reached Canada's RPM Country Songs chart where it also reached the top 20, peaking at number 20 in 1980. "He's Out of My Life" was later released on Duncan and Fricke's album Nice 'n' Easy. The album was released in October 1980.

=== Track listing ===
7" vinyl single

- "He's Out of My Life" – 3:14
- "Loving Arms" – 3:03

=== Charts ===
Chart performance for "He's Out of My Life"
| Chart (1980) | Peak position |
|---|---|
| Canada Country Songs (RPM) | 20 |
| US Hot Country Songs (Billboard) | 17 |

== Live covers ==
- Miguel performed a tribute at the 58th Annual Grammy Awards

== Parodies ==
- Comedian Eddie Murphy sang a few bars from "She's Out of My Life" while imitating Jackson during his 1983 stand-up comedy special Delirious. After the mock tears, he closed it by saying "Tito, get me some tissue..." "Jermaine, stop teasing".
- In the end credits of the 2001 film Monsters, Inc., Mike Wazowski parodies the song as "She's Out Of Our Hair", sitting atop a stool during a play about the events of the film.
