= I've Got a Winner in You =

Single by Don Williams

from the album Country Boy
- B-side: "Overlookin' and Underthinkin'
- Released: February 11, 1978
- Genre: Country
- Length: 2:36
- Label: ABC
- Songwriter(s): Don Williams, Wayland Holyfield
- Producer(s): Don Williams

Don Williams singles chronology
"I'm Just a Country Boy" (1977)	"I've Got a Winner in You" (1978)	"Rake and Ramblin' Man" (1978)

"I've Got a Winner in You" is a song co-written and recorded by American country music artist Don Williams. It was released in February 1978 as the second single from the album Country Boy. The song reached number 7 on the Billboard Hot Country Singles & Tracks chart. The song was written by Williams and Wayland Holyfield.

== Chart performance ==
Chart (1978)	Peak position
US Hot Country Songs (Billboard)	7
Canadian RPM Country Tracks	10
