= The White Knight (song) =

Single by Cledus Maggard & The Citizen's Band

from the album The White Knight
- Released: December 1975 (U.S.)
- Recorded: 1975
- Genre: Country
- Length: 4:05; 7:12 (extended version)
- Label: Mercury 73751
- Songwriter: Jay Huguely
- Producer: Leslie Advertising

Cledus Maggard & The Citizen's Band singles chronology
"The White Knight" (1975)	"Kentucky Moonrunner" (1976)

"The White Knight" is a novelty country music song made famous by Jay Huguely, who - recording as Cledus Maggard & The Citizen's Band - enjoyed a brief run of national popularity with the song when it became popular in 1976.

== Song story ==
Huguely was working as an advertising salesman at an agency named Leslie Advertising in Greenville, South Carolina in the mid-1970s when he was approached to help with an advertising campaign centering on the then fast-growing citizens' band radio craze. According to writer Tom Roland, Huguely knew little about the CB radio but agreed to help out.

After taking notes and getting help from his co-workers on deciphering the jargon, he went to work on writing a song.

=== Plot ===
Huguely's finished product was a story about an over-the-road truck driver with the handle "Mean Machine" who receives a CB call from an individual claiming to be a truck driver. Identifying himself as "The White Knight", he broadcasts that there are no "smokeys" (police officers) in sight. Truck drivers regularly relied on one another to watch for such "smokeys" so they could circumvent the still widely unpopular National Maximum Speed Law, which limited all drivers to 55 miles per hour (89 km/h), so they could cover more distance in a given time than the law allowed.

Unfortunately for the song's hero, The White Knight is an undercover member of the Georgia State Patrol who uses the CB radio to pretend to be a trucker himself to lure rig drivers into a speed trap. After driving for some time at high speed and listening to country music on the radio, he hears a driver going the other way warning him of a patrol car equipped with radar ahead. The Mean Machine dutifully slows down to the speed limit until he is past the patrol car (whom he mocks by calling him "Super Trooper" and noting "there's that crazy Smokey over there with a CB of his very own."). The White Knight then goads the Mean Machine into speeding to catch him by insulting Mean Machine's rig, inferring that he can't keep up. As he goes ever faster, the Mean Machine is soon surprised to see a patrol car's lights in his mirrors, and he is dismayed to learn that the "Super Trooper" patrolman and the White Knight are one and the same. The main hero is left to exclaim "Bubblegum-machine done hit the jackpot" as he is being pulled over for going "40 miles over the speed limit," (i.e., 95 miles per hour (153 km/h) although the singer only attests to going 92 miles per hour (148 km/h)). The Mean Machine is taken to jail to join eleven of the White Knight's other victims, and his truck confiscated.

The "White Knight" appears in a cameo in the follow-up single, "Kentucky Moonrunner". While the singer in "The White Knight" attempts to speed only when he believes no cops are present, the titular Kentucky Moonrunner simply outruns them with superior speed, recorded at over 150 miles per hour. The White Knight catches the Kentucky Moonrunner when he crosses into Georgia from Tennessee, with no explanation of how he could do so when the Tennessee cops could not.

== Commercial performance ==
"The White Knight" reached number one on the Billboard Hot Country Singles chart in February 1976, and was a modest pop hit, peaking at number nineteen on the Billboard Hot 100. The song was Maggard's only nationwide release to reach the Top 40 on either chart.

The song was one of three number one country songs during 1976 in which the CB radio is central to the plot. The other two were:

- "Convoy" by C.W. McCall: four of its six weeks atop the chart were in January;
- "Teddy Bear" by Red Sovine: peaked in July.

It is also the second top-40 pop hit of the 1970s to mention the Georgia State Patrol; Vicki Lawrence mentioned the Patrol in her hit "The Night the Lights Went Out in Georgia". In both songs, the patrolman arrests the protagonist of the song.

=== Chart positions ===
Chart (1976)	Peak position
U.S. Billboard Hot Country Singles	1
U.S. Billboard Hot 100	19
Canadian RPM Country Tracks	8
Canadian RPM Top Singles	50
