= Ray Materick =

Canadian singer-songwriter

Raymond George Materick (born August 19, 1946) is a Canadian singer-songwriter, from Brantford, Ontario who particularly was well-appreciated in the mid-late 1970s, who continues to perform. He is best known for writing and performing "Linda Put the Coffee On", a hit single in Canada in 1975, reaching number 21.

== History ==
Ray Materick is the son of an evangelical preacher, who had previously played saxophone, trumpet, and clarinet in his own dance band, during the 1940s and 1950s. Materick's recording career commenced in 1972, with the release of Sidestreets on Kanata Records, considered to be one of Canada's first independent record labels. The label folded soon after Materick's album was released. His major national breakthrough came with the release of Neon Rain in 1974 on Warner Bros./Asylum Records, featuring the hit single "Linda Put The Coffee On". The album was produced by Eugene Martynec. Materick had been specifically signed by record executive Gary Muth as one of the first Canadian artists on the U.S. Asylum Records label, formed by David Geffen. A number of albums followed throughout the 1970s: Best Friend Overnight (1975) and Midnight Matinee (1976), both of which were produced by Don Potter and featured musical contributions from Daniel Lanois, as well as Fever in Rio (1978). Materick did not continue with Asylum Records, following the release of Midnight Matinee. He had three other songs on the Canadian singles charts between 1972 and 1976.

During the 1980s, Materick withdrew from music for a period of approximately eight years, assuming employment in a Toronto woodworking company. He later relocated to Hamilton, Ontario.

Materick returned to recording as of 2000, releasing seven albums of new material in two years, and has regularly released new material and compilations since that time. The majority of Materick's later releases have been on his own label, King Kong Records.

In 2012, Materick was subject to two tribute concerts, in Toronto and Hamilton, respectively, by "Honouring Our Own", an organization dedicated to honouring musicians, while living, who have made a lifelong contribution to Canadian music.

In recent years, Materick has been involved in a band project, "Peace On Earth", with Keon Crosswell (bass, guitar) and Dan Kolthof(drums).

== Discography ==
=== Solo ===
- 1972 Sidestreets (Kanata/London) (#54 CAN)
- 1974 Neon Rain (Asylum/WEA) (#36 CAN)
- 1975 Best Friend Overnight (Asylum/WEA)
- 1976 Midnight Matinee (Asylum/WEA)
- 1979 Fever in Rio (Casino/London) (#84 CAN)
- 1981 Ray Materick (One Heart/Phonodisc)
- 2000 Rough Serenade (King Kong)
- 2000 Melting Pot (King Kong)
- 2000 Man in the Thunderbird (King Kong)
- 2000 Wild World (King Kong)
- 2000 Sunflowers (King Kong)
- 2001 Here at Home (King Kong)
- 2001 Violent Flood (King Kong)
- 2002 Songwriter (King Kong)
- 2003 Life & Times (Linus/Warner Music Canada)
- 2004 Live at The El Mocambo (King Kong)
- 2006 The Book Of Love (Christian Music Canada)
- 2006 Ragged Kingdom (New Dawn)
- 2009 Brother (King Kong)
- 2009 Born in Hell, Raised in Hell, Gonna Die in Hell (King Kong)

=== Peace On Earth ===
- 2012 World Without End (CD Baby)
- 2012 Unity (CD Baby)

=== Singles ===
Year	Name	Peak chart positions	
Year	Name	CAN	CAN AC
1972	"Goodbye"	—	11
1972	"Hard Life Alone / Season Of Plenty"	64	—
1973	"Dear Christine"	—	67
1975	"Linda Put the Coffee On"	21	3
1975	"Northbound Plane"	70	26
1976	"Feelin' Kinda Lucky Tonight"	57	11
