= The First Thing Ev'ry Morning (And the Last Thing Ev'ry Night) =

Single by Jimmy Dean

from the album The First Thing Ev'ry Morning
- B-side: "Awkward Situation"
- Released: April 1965
- Genre: Country
- Label: Columbia
- Songwriter(s): Jimmy Dean; Ruth Roberts
- Producer(s): Lor Crane

Jimmy Dean singles chronology
"Sam Hill" (1964)	"The First Thing Ev'ry Morning (And the Last Thing Ev'ry Night)" (1965)	"Harvest of Sunshine" (1965)

"The First Thing Ev'ry Morning (And the Last Thing Ev'ry Night)" is a song co-written by Jimmy Dean and Ruth Roberts. Dean recorded a single of the song in 1965; it was Dean's second and final number one on the U.S. country singles chart, spending two weeks at number one and a total of sixteen weeks on the chart.

== Chart performance ==
Chart (1965)	Peak position
U.S. Billboard Hot Country Singles	1
U.S. Billboard Hot 100	91
U.S. Billboard Hot Adult Contemporary Tracks	19
