= I.O.U. (Jimmy Dean song) =

Single by Jimmy Dean

from the album I.O.U.
- B-side: "Let's Pick Up The Pieces"
- Released: April 1976
- Recorded: c. January 1976
- Genre: Country
- Label: Casino Records 052
- Songwriter(s): Jimmy Dean and Larry Markes
- Producer(s): Gary S. Paxton

Jimmy Dean singles chronology
"Your Sweet Love (Keeps Me Homeward Bound)" (1973)	"I.O.U." (1976)	"To a Sleeping Beauty" (1976)

I.O.U. is a song written by Jimmy Dean and Larry Markes, and recorded most famously by Dean. A recitation with an instrumental backing that paid homage to mothers and motherhood, "I.O.U." became Dean's first top 10 country hit in 10 years and briefly sparked the comeback of sentimental-style recitations.

== Song background ==
Dean's last top 10 hit on the Hot Country Singles chart was "Stand Beside Me," which peaked at No. 10 in 1966. In the ensuing years, Dean's single releases charted at progressively lower positions.

In 1976, Dean wrote and recorded a tribute to mothers. Throughout the piece, a young man reflects on the many roles his mother played through the years: nurse, mediator, protector, doctor, cook, entertainer, and the rock by which the family held together. By the end of the song, he admits that while payment for services rendered through the years is long overdue, he knows that any such request to make a payment will be marked "paid in full" ... "For just one kiss and four little words....Mom, I love you!'" Essentially the same theme appeared more than two years earlier in the lyrics of "No Charge".

== Chart history ==
"I.O.U." was released in April 1976, shortly before Mother's Day. The song became an unexpected success and peaked at No. 9 on the Hot Country Singles chart by the end of May. The song also crossed over to the Billboard Hot 100 (where Dean had enjoyed crossover success throughout the early- to mid-1960s), and eventually peaked at No. 35.

Greg Adams of Allmusic wrote, "'I.O.U.' was very successful and Dean, in tandem with Red Sovine, put the old-fashioned recitation back on the charts for a while" (referring to Sovine's hit "Teddy Bear").

=== Chart performance ===
Chart (1976)	Peak position
U.S. Billboard Hot Country Singles	9
U.S. Billboard Hot 100	35
U.S. Cashbox Top 100	33
U.S. Billboard Hot Adult Contemporary Tracks	47
Australia Kent Music Report	18
Canadian RPM Country Tracks	38
Canadian RPM Top Singles	30
Canadian RPM Adult Contemporary Tracks	3
Chart (1977)	Peak position
U.S. Billboard Hot Country Singles	90
