= Just Bummin' Around =

"Just a Bummin' Around"

Song by Dean Martin
- Released: December 11, 1967
- Songwriter: Pete Graves
- Producer: Jack Haley Jr. (Movin' with Nancy)

"Just Bummin' Around" was a hit song for Jimmy Dean as "Bumming Around" in 1952 reached No. 5 in the Billboard Country charts. Another version by T. Texas Tyler also reached the No. 5 spot in the same charts in 1953.

The song was written by Pete Graves. Graves, who also recorded the tune, is quoted as saying that he took lyrics from a rodeo song he had written when he was a rodeo rider, including the lines free as a breeze, I do as I please, nothing to lose and not even the blues, and added them into "Just Bummin' Around." Graves also said he pulled the line "I got an old slouch hat" from an Ernest Tubb song, "Blue Eyed Elaine." He said he waited on Tubb to sue him but he didn't.

== Other recordings ==
The song was later recorded by American singer Dean Martin in 1965 and included as the B side of his single Houston. He included it on his 1965 album (Remember Me) I'm the One Who Loves You and it was reprised by him in the 1967 television special, Movin' With Nancy, starring Nancy Sinatra. The television special was released to home video in 2000.

Perry Como recorded the song in 1965 but it was not released until it was included in the compilation CD set Yesterday and Today in 1993.

Bobby Darin was another who recorded the song in 1965 and this remained unreleased until it turned up on the album Bobby Darin - The Unreleased Capitol Sides in 1999.
