= Rake and Ramblin' Man =

1978 single by Don Williams

Single by Don Williams

from the album Country Boy
- B-side: "Too Many Tears"
- Released: July 1, 1978
- Genre: Country
- Length: 2:53
- Label: ABC
- Songwriter(s): Bob McDill
- Producer(s): Don Williams

Don Williams singles chronology
"I've Got a Winner in You" (1978)	"Rake and Ramblin' Man" (1978)	"Tulsa Time" (1978)

"Rake and Ramblin' Man" is a song written by Bob McDill, and recorded by American country music artist Don Williams. It was released in July 1978 as the third single from the album Country Boy. The song reached number 3 on the Billboard Hot Country Singles & Tracks chart

== Charts ==
=== Weekly charts ===
Chart (1978)	Peak position
US Hot Country Songs (Billboard)	3
Canadian RPM Country Tracks	2

=== Year-end charts ===
Chart (1978)	Position
US Hot Country Songs (Billboard)	40
