= Some Broken Hearts Never Mend =

Single by Don Williams

from the album Visions
- B-side: "I'll Forgive But I'll Never Forget"
- Released: January 1977
- Genre: Country
- Length: 2:50
- Label: ABC/Dot
- Songwriter: Wayland Holyfield
- Producer: Don Williams

Don Williams singles chronology
"She Never Knew Me" (1976)	"Some Broken Hearts Never Mend" (1977)	"I'm Just a Country Boy" (1977)

"Some Broken Hearts Never Mend" is a song written by Wayland Holyfield and recorded by American country music artist Don Williams. It was released in January 1977 as the first single from his album Visions. The song was Williams' sixth number one on the country chart. The single stayed at number one for a single week and spent a total of 12 weeks within the top 40.

The song was also an international hit for Telly Savalas in 1981. It topped the Swiss charts for two weeks, and peaked at number two in Austria and number four in the Netherlands.

A cover version of the song, performed by Danny McBride, Adam DeVine, and Edi Patterson, is used as the soundtrack to the final scene of the second season of the comedy series The Righteous Gemstones.

== Chart performance ==
Don Williams

Chart (1977)	Peak position
US Hot Country Songs (Billboard)	1
US Bubbling Under Hot 100 (Billboard)	8
US Cash Box Top 100	99
Canadian RPM Country Tracks	6

Year-end charts

Chart (1977)	Position
US Hot Country Songs (Billboard)	12

Brendan Shine

Chart (1977)	Peak position
Ireland (IRMA)	5

Telly Savalas

Chart (1981)	Peak position
Swiss Hitparade Singles	1
German Media Control Charts Singles	5
Ö3 Austria Top 40 Singles	2
Dutch Singles Charts	4
Belgian Ultratop Singles	2
