= A Song in the Night (song) =

Single by Johnny Duncan

from the album Come a Little Bit Closer
- B-side: "Use My Love"
- Released: June 1977
- Recorded: 1977
- Genre: Country
- Length: 2:41
- Label: Columbia 10554
- Songwriter: Bobby Springfield
- Producer: Billy Sherrill

Johnny Duncan singles chronology
| "It Couldn't Have Been Any Better" (1977) | "A Song in the Night" (1977) | "Come a Little Bit Closer" (1977) |

"A Song in the Night" is a country music song written by Bobby Lee Springfield, recorded by Johnny Duncan. It was the first of two singles from his 1977 LP, Come a Little Bit Closer. Harmony vocals during the last minute of the song were provided by Janie Fricke.

Initially promoted as "his best record yet," the song went to No. 5 on both Billboard American and Canadian Hot Country Singles charts. It became his fourth of a string of seven Top Five hits.

Duncan's only song to cross over to the Pop charts, "A Song in the Night" also reached #105 in the U.S.

== Charts ==
=== Weekly charts ===
| Chart (1977) | Peak position |
|---|---|
| US Hot Country Songs (Billboard) | 5 |
| US Billboard Bubbling Under Hot 100 Singles | 105 |
| Canadian RPM Country Tracks | 5 |

=== Year-end charts ===
| Chart (1977) | Position |
|---|---|
| US Hot Country Songs (Billboard) | 30 |
