= 'Til the Rivers All Run Dry =

Single by Don Williams

from the album Harmony
- B-side: "Don't You Think It's Time"
- Released: December 15, 1975
- Genre: Country
- Length: 3:27
- Label: ABC/Dot
- Songwriters: Don Williams; Wayland Holyfield
- Producer: Don Williams

Don Williams singles chronology
"(Turn Out the Light And) Love Me Tonight" (1975)	"'Til the Rivers All Run Dry" (1975)	"Say It Again" (1976)

"'Til the Rivers All Run Dry" is a song recorded by American country music artist Don Williams, who co-wrote it with Wayland Holyfield. It was released in December 1975 as the first single from the album Harmony. The song was Williams' fourth number one on the country chart. The single stayed at number one for one week and spent 12 weeks on the country charts.

Cover versions include the Pete Townshend/Ronnie Lane version on their Rough Mix album (1977), and by Carla Olson and Rob Waller on 2013's Have Harmony, Will Travel. Alison Krauss recorded it for the tribute album Gentle Giants: The Songs of Don Williams (2017).

== Charts ==
=== Weekly charts ===
Chart (1975–1976)	Peak position
US Hot Country Songs (Billboard)	1

=== Year-end charts ===
Chart (1976)	Position
US Hot Country Songs (Billboard)	14
