= Thinkin' of a Rendezvous =

Single by Johnny Duncan

from the album Johnny Duncan
- B-side: "Love Should Be Easy"
- Released: September 1976
- Recorded: July 1976
- Genre: Country
- Length: 3:24
- Label: Columbia 10417
- Songwriters: Bobby Braddock and Sonny Throckmorton
- Producer: Billy Sherrill

Johnny Duncan singles chronology
"Stranger" (1976)	"Thinkin' of a Rendezvous" (1976)	"It Couldn't Have Been Any Better" (1977)

"Thinkin' of a Rendezvous" is a country music song written by Bobby Braddock and Sonny Throckmorton, and recorded by Johnny Duncan.

Featuring harmony vocals, and a solo line at a key point in the song's third verse by session vocalist Janie Fricke, "Thinkin' of a Rendezvous" was Duncan's first number-one song on the Billboard Hot Country Singles chart in December 1976. A two-week run atop the country chart was part of a 13-week stay in the country chart's top 40.

The song — about a family man who meets up with a woman, a long-time friend with whom he had a secret affair a year earlier — was the first of two Duncan-Fricke duets to top the charts. The follow-up song, "It Couldn't Have Been Any Better", went number one in April 1977, and the two enjoyed several other duet hits, most notably "Stranger" (written by Kris Kristofferson, and a hit in July 1976) and "Come a Little Bit Closer" in January 1978 (a cover of the Jay and the Americans).

== Charts ==
=== Weekly charts ===
Chart (1976)	Peak position
US Hot Country Songs (Billboard)	1
Canadian RPM Country Tracks	1

=== Year-end charts ===
Chart (1977)	Position
US Hot Country Songs (Billboard)	19
