= Say It Again (Don Williams song) =

Single by Don Williams

from the album Harmony
- B-side: "I Don't Want the Money"
- Released: April 30, 1976
- Genre: Country
- Length: 2:56
- Label: ABC/Dot
- Songwriter(s): Bob McDill
- Producer(s): Don Williams

Don Williams singles chronology
| "'Til the Rivers All Run Dry" (1975) | "Say It Again" (1976) | "She Never Knew Me" (1976) |

"Say It Again" is a song written by Bob McDill and recorded by American country music artist Don Williams. It was released in April 1976 as the second single from the album Harmony. The song was Williams' fifth number one on the country chart. The single stayed at number one for one week and spent 12 weeks on the country chart.

== Charts ==
=== Weekly charts ===
| Chart (1976) | Peak position |
|---|---|
| US Hot Country Songs (Billboard) | 1 |
| Canadian RPM Country Tracks | 4 |

=== Year-end charts ===
| Chart (1976) | Position |
|---|---|
| US Hot Country Songs (Billboard) | 19 |
