= Marshall Barer =

American musical theatre composer (1923–1998)

Marshall Barer (born Marshall Louis Barer; February 19, 1923 in Astoria, Queens – August 25, 1998 in Santa Fe, New Mexico) was a lyricist, librettist, singer, songwriter and director.

== Early career ==
Barer began his career as a lyricist and songwriter in the late 1940s while working as a commercial artist/designer in New York. His most-heard song is the Mighty Mouse theme song.

== Career ==
He had his greatest Broadway success came in 1959 with Once Upon a Mattress, for which he was lyricist and a book writer.

In 1972 he wrote 7 songs for Scarecrow in a Garden of Cucumbers, a low-budget movie starring Holly Woodlawn.

== Death ==
Marshall died aged 75 in Santa Fe, New Mexico, at his home, after living many years in Venice, California.

== Popular songs ==
- River Run
- La Ronde (This Is Quite a Perfect Night)
- Scratch My Back
- Roller Coaster Blues
- Intoxication
- In a Little While
- Shy
- Normandy
- Very Soft Shoes
- Song of Love (I'm In Love With A Girl Named Fred)
- Christmas long Ago
- What'll I Do With All the Love I Was Savin' for You?
- Warm Winter
- On Such A Night As This

== Musicals/stage ==
- Walk Tall (1954)
- New Faces of 1956 (1956)
- Ziegfeld Follies (1957 starring Beatrice Lillie)
- Once Upon a Mattress (1959)
- Dancing on the Air (an adaptation of Shaw's The Devil's Disciple) with Dean Fuller
- Around the World in Eighty Days with music by Michel Legrand
- A Little Night Music (never produced)
- Pousse-Café Music by Duke Ellington
