= Cledus Maggard & the Citizen's Band =

American singer-songwriter and actor (1940–2008)

- Birth name: James Wesley Huguely
- Born: September 21, 1940
- Origin: Richmond, Kentucky, U.S.
- Died: December 13, 2008 (aged 68); Valencia, California, U.S.
- Genres: Country, novelty
- Occupations: Singer; actor
- Instrument: Vocals
- Years active: 1976
- Labels: Mercury Records

James Wesley "Jay" Huguely (September 21, 1940 – December 13, 2008) was an American stage actor, singer, advertising executive, and television writer and executive. He enjoyed a brief run of popularity as a novelty recording artist in the 1970s, billed as Cledus Maggard & the Citizen's Band. He worked for Leslie Advertising in Greenville, South Carolina and enjoyed his only hit in 1976 with "The White Knight", released during the wave of popularity of the citizens' band radio. The song is about a truck driver victimized by a Georgia highway patrolman's speed trap. He chose the name "Cledus" after his mother's name Cleta.

"The White Knight" reached No. 1 on the Billboard magazine Hot Country Singles chart in February 1976, and was his only hit to reach that chart's Top 40. Following the success of this record, Huguely was a producer on the 1980s television series Magnum, P.I.. In the 1990s, he was a writer and producer, known for Jason Goes to Hell: The Final Friday (1993), Street Justice (1991), and Bandit: Bandit's Silver Angel (1994).

Huguely died in Valencia, California, on December 13, 2008, at the age of 68.

== Discography ==
=== Albums ===
Year	Album	Chart Positions		Label
Year	Album	US Country	US	Label
1976	The White Knight	4	135	Mercury
1976	Two More Sides	—	—	Mercury

=== Singles ===
Year	Single	Chart Positions				Album
Year	Single	US Country	US	CAN Country	CAN	Album
1975	"The White Knight"	1	19	8	50	The White Knight
1976	"Kentucky Moonrunner"	42	85	—	—	The White Knight
1976	"Virgil and the $300 Vacation" (as Cledus Maggard)	73	—	—	—	Two More Sides
1977	"Yovnoc" (as Cledus Maggard)	—	—	—	—	Two More Sides
1978	"The Farmer" (as Cledus Maggard)	82	—	—	—	Two More Sides
