= Johnny Duncan (country singer) =

American singer-songwriter (1938–2006)

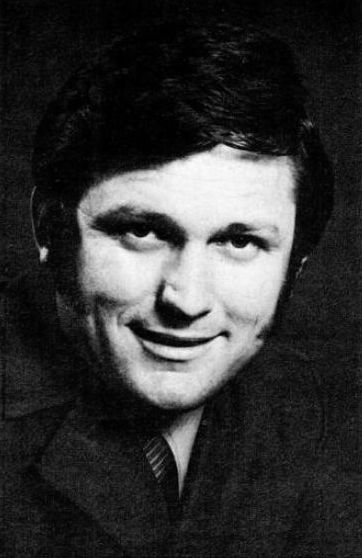
- Duncan in 1971

Background information
- Born: John Richard Duncan; October 5, 1938
- Origin: Dublin, Texas, U.S.
- Died: August 14, 2006 (aged 67)
- Genre: Country
- Occupation: Singer
- Instruments: Vocals; guitar
- Years active: 1960–2006
- Label: Columbia

John Richard Duncan (October 5, 1938 – August 14, 2006) was an American country music singer-songwriter, best known for a string of hits in the mid- to late 1970s. In his career, he released 14 studio albums, including thirteen on Columbia Records. These albums produced more than 30 chart singles, with three of those reaching number one: "Thinkin' of a Rendezvous", "It Couldn't Have Been Any Better", and "She Can Put Her Shoes Under my Bed (Anytime)" from 1976, 1977, and 1978, respectively. Seven more of his singles were top-10 hits.

== Biography ==
Duncan was born in Dublin, Texas, United States. Before he went to Nashville, Duncan attended Texas Christian University in Fort Worth, Texas. He then spent a few years in Clovis, New Mexico.

=== Early life and influences ===
Duncan's early life was steeped in the music of West Texas. He picked this up naturally as a boy listening to his mother play rhythm guitar in his uncle's country band. Later, he began sharpening his vocal skills, influenced by his early idols Eddy Arnold, Perry Como, Jim Reeves, and Frank Sinatra. He was born into a musical family. He was proud of his talented cousins, including Eddie Seals, Jimmy Seals of Seals & Crofts, and country singer Dan Seals. "He knew when he was 12 years old that playing music and singing songs was going to be his life", said his wife, Connie Duncan.

"He grew up here in a small country town and loved music", Jim Harrell said. "His mother played herself and a lot of his cousins played with him." (Jim Harrell, owner and funeral director of Harrell Funeral Home in Dublin, which handled arrangements for his funeral)

After playing and singing with his musically gifted family for a few years, he auditioned demos in April 1959 for Norman Petty in Clovis. Petty recognized his talent as a gifted songwriter, and Duncan was signed to Leader Records, a subsidiary of the Kapp Records label. After three US singles and one UK release between 1959 and 1962 garnered little attention, Duncan grew tired of being marketed as a pop vocalist and decided to pursue the country genre, moving to Nashville.

Duncan wrote many songs recorded by artists such as Charley Pride, Marty Robbins, Chet Atkins, Conway Twitty, and Jim Ed Brown.

=== Career ===
In Franklin, Tennessee, Duncan worked as a DJ and performed on local morning TV shows. He began to record for Columbia Records in the late 1960s. Between 1967 and 1973, Duncan's recordings never reached the top 20 until "Sweet Country Woman" entered at number six.

In the 1970s, Duncan performed duets with Janie Fricke, many of which were successful. Their songs "Stranger" and "Thinking of a Rendezvous" (both 1976), "It Couldn't Have Been Any Better" (1977), and "Come A Little Bit Closer" (1978, a remake of the song first made popular by Jay and the Americans) were the most successful. "Thinking of a Rendezvous" and "It Couldn't Have Been Any Better" both went to No. 1 on the Billboard Hot Country Singles chart, as did Duncan's solo 1978 single "She Can Put Her Shoes Under My Bed Anytime".

Duncan's string of top-10 hits continued into 1979 – most notably a cover of Johnny Rivers' "Swayin' to the Music" (released by Duncan as "Slow Dancing") and "The Lady in the Blue Mercedes" – and he even enjoyed another top-20 hit with Fricke in 1980 with a duet version of Michael Jackson's "She's Out of My Life". His star power faded in the early 1980s with changing musical tastes, although his biggest songs were popular on country radio through the late 1980s and early 1990s.

=== Personal life and death ===
Duncan died of a heart attack on August 14, 2006, at the age of 67. Duncan has three daughters: Angela, Lezlie and Lori with his first wife, Betty Deisher, and his son John “Ike” Duncan, with wife Connie Duncan, who survived him. Johnny also had one singular grandchild from daughter Lezlie, John Dewey Haggard, also from the Stephenville/Dublin, TX area.

== Discography ==
=== Studio albums ===
Year	Album	Chart Positions		Label
Year	Album	US Country	CAN Country	Label
1968	Johnny One Time	40	—	Columbia
1969	Back to Back (w/ June Stearns)	—	—	Columbia
1971	There's Something About a Lady	—	—	Columbia
1973	Sweet Country Woman	34	—	Columbia
1973	You're Gonna Need a Man	—	—	Harmony
1977	Johnny Duncan	21	—	Columbia
1977	Come a Little Bit Closer	27	—	Columbia
1978	The Best Is Yet to Come	42	8	Columbia
1979	See You When the Sun Goes Down	—	—	Columbia
1979	Straight from Texas	—	—	Columbia
1980	In My Dreams	61	—	Columbia
1980	Nice 'n' Easy (w/ Janie Fricke)	—	—	Columbia
1980	You're on My Mind	—	—	Columbia
1986	Faraway Hideaway	—	—	Pharaoh
2005	The Thing To Do	—	—	JRD Records

=== Compilation albums ===
Year	Album	US Country	Label
1976	The Best	5	Columbia
1978	Greatest Hits	45	Columbia
1998	Pure Country	—	Columbia
1998	Classic Country	—	Simitar
2003	It Couldn't Have Been Any Better	—	Collector's Choice
2018	Thinkin' Of A Rendezvous ~ Columbia Country Hits 1969–1980	—	T-Bird Americana

=== Singles ===
Year	Single	Chart Positions		Album
Year	Single	US Country	CAN Country	Album
1967	"Hard Luck Joe"	54	—	Johnny One Time
1968	"Baby Me Baby"	67	—	Johnny One Time
1968	"To My Sorrow"	47	—	Johnny One Time
1968	"Jackson Ain't a Very Big Town" (w/ June Stearns)	21	—	Back to Back
1969	"I Live to Love You"	70	—	Single only
1969	"Back to Back (We're Strangers)" (w/ June Stearns)	74	—	Back to Back
1969	"When She Touches Me"	30	—	Johnny One Time
1970	"Window Number Five"	65	—	You're Gonna Need a Man
1970	"You're Gonna Need a Man"	39	—	There's Something About a Lady
1970	"My Woman's Love"	68	—	There's Something About a Lady
1970	"Let Me Go (Set Me Free)"	27	43	There's Something About a Lady
1971	"There's Something About a Lady"	19	—	There's Something About a Lady
1971	"One Night of Love"	39	—	Sweet Country Woman
1971	"Baby's Smile, Woman's Kiss"	12	—	You're Gonna Need a Man
1972	"Fools"	19	16	Sweet Country Woman
1972	"Here We Go Again"	66	—	Single only
1973	"Sweet Country Woman"	6	8	Sweet Country Woman
1973	"Talkin' with My Lady"	18	42	The Best
1974	"The Pillow"	47	—	The Best Is Yet to Come
1974	"Scarlet Water"	66	—	The Best
1975	"Charley Is My Name"	57	—	Johnny Duncan
1975	"Jo and the Cowboy"	26	28	The Best
1976	"Gentle Fire"	86	—	The Best
1976	"Stranger"	4	13	The Best
1976	"Thinkin' of a Rendezvous"	1	1	Johnny Duncan
1977	"It Couldn't Have Been Any Better"	1	1	Johnny Duncan
1977	"A Song in the Night"^{A}	5	5	Come a Little Bit Closer
1977	"Come a Little Bit Closer" (w/ Janie Fricke)	4	2	Come a Little Bit Closer
1978	"She Can Put Her Shoes Under My Bed (Anytime)"	1	1	The Best Is Yet to Come
1978	"Hello Mexico (And Adios Baby to You)"	4	7	The Best Is Yet to Come
1979	"Slow Dancing"	6	8	See You When the Sun Goes Down
1979	"The Lady in the Blue Mercedes"	9	21	Straight from Texas
1980	"Play Another Slow Song"	17	31	Straight from Texas
1980	"I'm Gonna Love You Tonight (In My Dreams)"	17	48	In My Dreams
1980	"He's Out of My Life" (w/ Janie Fricke)	17	20	Nice'n Easy
1980	"Acapulco"	16	—	You're on My Mind
1981	"All Night Long"	40	—	Single only
1986	"The Look of a Lady in Love"	69	—	Faraway Hideaway
1986	"Texas Moon"	81	—	Faraway Hideaway

- ^{A}"A Song in the Night" also peaked at No. 5 on Bubbling Under Hot 100 Singles.
