= Jimmy Dean =

American singer, television host and actor (1928–2010)

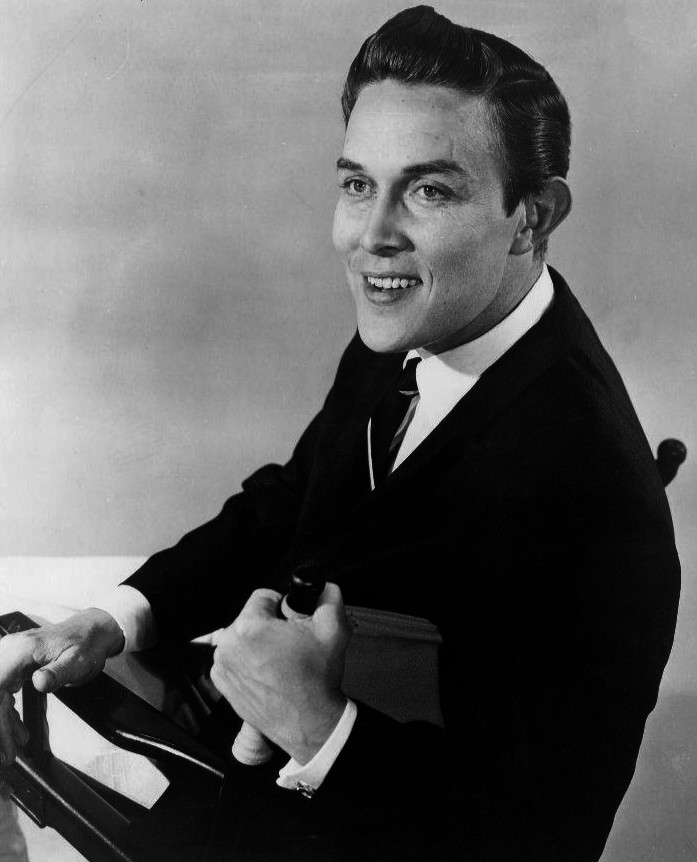
- Dean in 1966

Background information
- Born: Jimmy Ray Dean; August 10, 1928; Seth Ward, Texas, U.S.
- Died: June 13, 2010 (aged 81) Varina, Virginia, U.S.
- Genres: Country; rockabilly
- Occupations: Singer; songwriter; television host; actor; businessman; philanthropist
- Instruments: Vocals; accordion; piano
- Years active: 1953–2010
- Labels: Columbia Records; RCA Victor

Jimmy Ray Dean (August 10, 1928 – June 13, 2010) was an American country music singer, songwriter, television host, actor and businessman. He was the creator of the Jimmy Dean sausage brand as well as the spokesman for its TV commercials, and his likeness and voice continue to be used in advertisements after his death.

Dean became a national television personality starting on CBS in 1957. He rose to fame for his 1961 country music crossover hit into rock and roll with "Big Bad John", and his 1963 television series The Jimmy Dean Show gave puppeteer Jim Henson his first national exposure with his character, Rowlf.

His acting career included appearing in the early seasons in the Daniel Boone television series as the sidekick of the famous frontiersman played by star Fess Parker. Later, he played a supporting role as billionaire Willard Whyte in the James Bond film Diamonds Are Forever (1971), starring Sean Connery.

He lived near Richmond, Virginia, and was nominated for the Country Music Hall of Fame in 2010, but died before his induction that year at the age of 81.

== Biography ==
Jimmy Dean: "Nine Pound Hammer"

=== Early life ===
Dean was born on August 10, 1928, in Seth Ward, Texas, and raised in nearby Plainview, the son of George Otto Dean and his second wife, the former Ruth Taylor. Ruth taught Jimmy how to play piano at the age of 10. He attributed his interest in music to the Seth Ward Baptist Church. He dropped out of high school and became a professional entertainer after serving in the U.S. Air Force in the late 1940s. Dean was 22 and just starting in show business when he married his first wife, Mary Sue, in 1950.

=== Entertainment career ===
Dean had his first hit, "Bumming Around", in 1953 on the 4 Star label (written by Pete Graves, credited to "C. Graves" on the Quality label). Dean signed with Columbia Records in 1957.

He had minor pop hits, such as "Little Sandy Sleighfoot" (a Christmas novelty song) and "Sing Along", later used as the theme for TV's Sing Along with Mitch, hosted by chorus leader Mitch Miller.

In 1954, Dean hosted the popular Washington, D.C., radio program Town and Country Time on WARL-AM, and with his Texas Wildcats became popular in the Mid-Atlantic region. Patsy Cline and Roy Clark got their starts on the show. Although Cline and Dean became good friends, Clark (Dean's lead guitarist) was fired by the singer for what was explained as his chronic tardiness. Dean replaced Clark with Billy Grammer. In 1955, Town and Country Time moved to WMAL-TV (now WJLA-TV) on weekday afternoons. Dean and the Texas Wildcats also appeared during 1957 on Town and Country Jamboree on WMAL-TV on Saturdays, which was also carried by TV stations in neighboring Maryland and Virginia on a regional network.

Also during 1957, while he lived in Arlington County, Virginia, Dean hosted Country Style on WTOP-TV (now WUSA-TV). CBS picked up the show nationally from Washington from April 8 to December 13, 1957 under the name The Morning Show. In addition, Dean hosted his first prime time show, a half-hour summer series The Jimmy Dean Show that aired from Washington, DC, on CBS from June 22 to September 14, 1957 from 10:30 to 11 p.m. on Saturday nights. Then from September 14, 1958 to June 1959, CBS carried The Jimmy Dean Show on weekday and Saturday afternoons.

Dean became best known for "Big Bad John", his 1961 recitation song about a heroic miner. Recorded in Nashville, the record went to number one on the Billboard pop chart and inspired many imitations and parodies. It sold over one million copies and was awarded a gold disc. The track peaked at number two in the UK Singles Chart. The song won Dean the 1962 Grammy Award for Best Country & Western Recording. He had several more top 40 songs, including a top 10 in 1962 with "PT-109", a song in honor of President John F. Kennedy's bravery in World War II, with the sinking of his PT-boat in the South Pacific Ocean by the Japanese.

In the early 1960s, he hosted The Tonight Show on occasion (he was the first guest host during Johnny Carson's tenure, hosting for the first time on January 14, 1963) and one night introduced country singer Roy Clark, with whom he had remained friendly. In the mid-1960s, Dean helped bring country music into the mainstream with his 1963–66 prime time variety series The Jimmy Dean Show on ABC. It presented country music entertainers including Roger Miller, George Jones, Charlie Rich, Buck Owens, and some (such as Joe Maphis) who seldom received network exposure. In 1964, he hosted Hank Williams Jr. in Williams' first television appearance at the age of 14. He sang several songs associated with his father, Hank Williams. The program also featured comedy and a variety of popular music artists, and Dean's sketches with Rowlf the Dog, one of Jim Henson's Muppets. Henson was so grateful for this break that he offered Dean a 40% interest in his production company, but Dean declined on the basis that he had done nothing to truly earn it and Henson deserved all the rewards for his own work. For the rest of his life, Dean made it clear that he never regretted this decision.

Dean appeared on several TV talk shows and game shows in the 1960s and performed on variety programs, including The Ed Sullivan Show, The Pat Boone Chevy Showroom and The Hollywood Palace. Dean turned to acting after his television series ended in 1966. His best-known role was as a reclusive Las Vegas billionaire Willard Whyte, inspired by Howard Hughes, in the James Bond movie Diamonds Are Forever (1971) with Sean Connery as Bond. He also appeared in 14 episodes of Daniel Boone (1967–70) in three different roles (one episode as "Delo Jones," two as "Jeremiah," and 11 as "Josh Clements"); as Charlie Rowlands in two Fantasy Island episodes (1981–82); and on other television shows including a semi-regular role as Charlie Bullets on J.J. Starbuck starring Dale Robertson (1987–1988).

Dean's singing career remained strong into the mid-1960s; in 1965, he achieved a second number one country hit with the ballad "The First Thing Ev'ry Morning (And the Last Thing Ev'ry Night)", and he had a top 40 hit that year with "Harvest of Sunshine". In 1966, Dean signed with RCA Victor and immediately had a top 10 hit with "Stand Beside Me". His other major hits during this time included "Sweet Misery" (1967) and "A Thing Called Love" (1968). He continued charting into the early 1970s with his major hits, including "Slowly" (1971), a duet with Dottie West, and a solo hit with "The One You Say Good Morning To" (1972).

In 1976, Dean achieved a million-seller with another recitation song called "I.O.U.", a tribute to his mother and mothers everywhere. The song was released a few weeks before Mother's Day and quickly became a top 10 country hit, his first in 10 years, and a top 40 pop hit, his first in 14 years. The song was re-released in 1977, 1983, and 1984, but with minor success each time.

In January 1978, Dean hosted an all-star tribute to Elvis Presley titled Nashville Remembers Elvis on His Birthday, during which he reminisced about his friendship with the recently deceased singer and performed his own hit "Big Bad John" and "Peace in the Valley".

=== Business career ===
In 1969, he founded the Jimmy Dean Sausage Company with his brother Don. The company did well in part because of Dean's own extemporized, humorous commercials.

The success of the company led to its acquisition in 1984 by Consolidated Foods, later renamed the Sara Lee Corporation. Dean remained involved as spokesman for the company, but the new corporate parent immediately began phasing him out of any management duties. In January 2004, Dean said that Sara Lee had dropped him as the spokesman for the sausage brand because he was too old. In March 2004, Dean revealed that he had sold all but one of his shares in Sara Lee stock. In 2018, several years after his death, the sausage company began re-airing some classic commercials featuring the voice of Dean introducing himself and praising the product.

=== Later years and death ===
In the 1980s, he and his wife and family were residents of Tenafly, New Jersey.

A Virginia resident from 1990, Dean was inducted into the Virginia Country Music Hall of Fame in 1997. Former Virginia governor Jim Gilmore appointed Dean to the Virginia Board of Game and Inland Fisheries, which oversees the state's wildlife efforts and boating laws. Dean owned a 110-foot yacht, Big Bad John, on which he hosted President George Bush on numerous occasions. The two had originally met on Dean's cable show in Nashville, where Bush did an impression of Dean selling sausage.

In the late 1990s, Dean and his wife donated generously to Varina High School. After initially considering opening their own school, they chose to support that public school instead. They sponsored financial rewards for academic achievements for students, as well as stipends for teacher professional development.

In the fall of 2004, he released his blunt, straight-talking autobiography 30 Years of Sausage, 50 Years of Ham. Dean lived in semi-retirement with his second wife, Donna Meade Dean, a singer, songwriter, and recording artist he married in 1991, who helped him write his book. The couple lived on their property at Chaffin's Bluff overlooking the James River in Henrico County, on the outskirts of Richmond, Virginia. On April 20, 2009, the main house was largely gutted by a fire, although the Deans escaped injury. The Deans rebuilt their home on the same foundation and returned early in 2010.

Dean announced on May 20, 2008, a donation of $1 million to Wayland Baptist University in Plainview, the largest gift ever from one individual to the institution. Dean said: "I've been so blessed, and it makes me proud to give back, especially to my hometown."

On February 23, 2010, Dean was nominated for the Country Music Hall of Fame; he was scheduled to be inducted in October 2010, but this occurred after his death.

Dean had three children, Garry, Connie and Robert, with his first wife Mary Sue (Sue) (née Wittauer) Dean, and two granddaughters, Caroline Taylor (Connie's daughter) and Brianna Dean (Robert's daughter). He married his first wife in 1950; she divorced him in 1990 because of his affair with country-singer Donna Meade who became his second wife. Donna Dean married her childhood sweetheart Jason Stevens two years after Dean's death.

Dean died at his home in Varina, Virginia, on June 13, 2010, at the age of 81. He was survived by his second wife Donna. She told the Associated Press that he was doing well health-wise, so his death came unexpectedly. She recollects that he was eating dinner while watching television, she left the room, and when she came back in he was unresponsive. He was declared dead at 7:54 pm. His estate was estimated to be worth over $50 million.

He was entombed in a 9-foot-tall (2.7 m) piano-shaped mausoleum overlooking the James River on the grounds of his estate. His epitaph reads "Here Lies One Hell of a Man", which is a paraphrased lyric from the uncensored version of his song "Big Bad John".

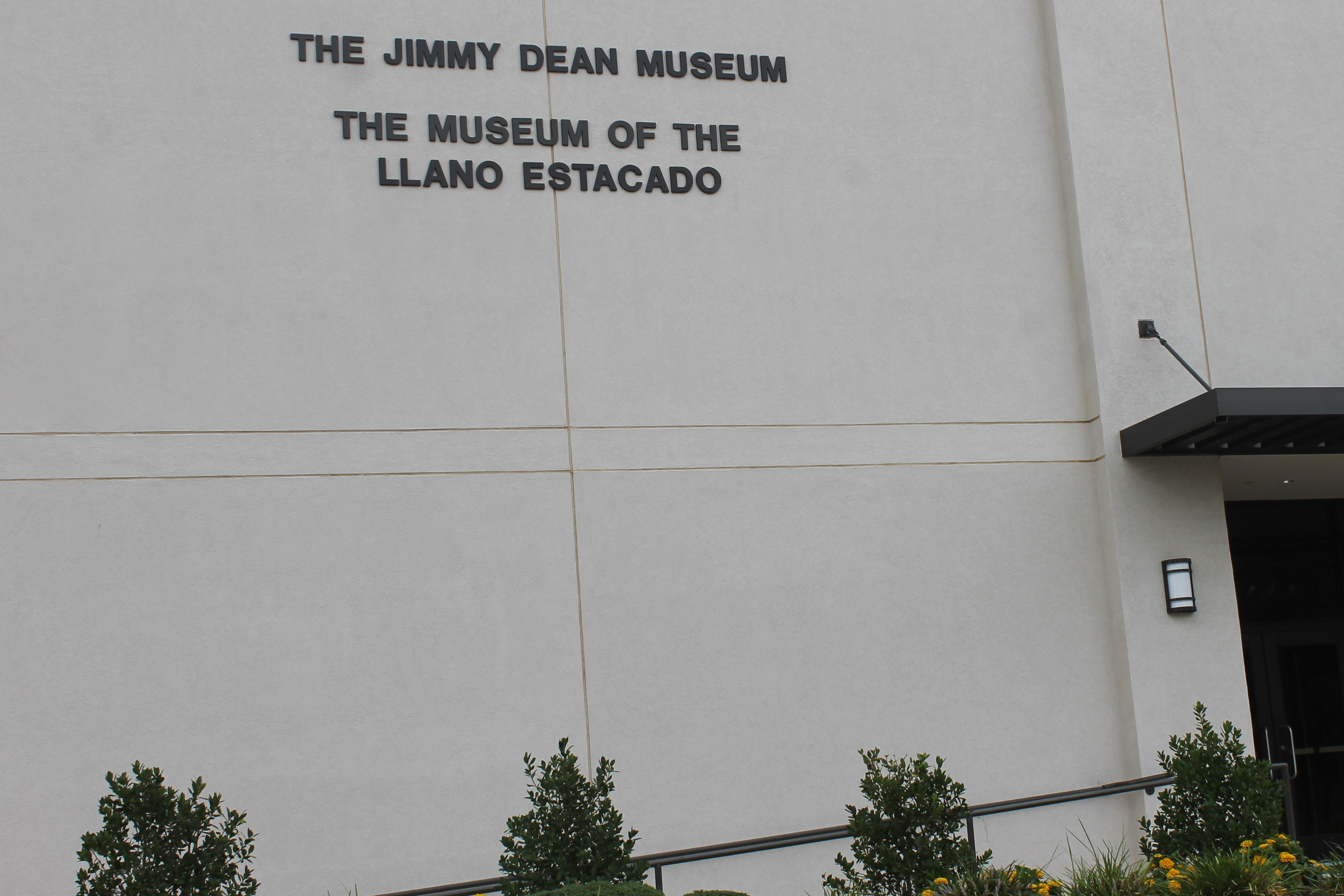
The Jimmy Dean Museum in Plainview, Texas, shares the same building as The Museum of the Llano Estacado on the campus of Wayland Baptist University.

On June 24, 2014, a groundbreaking was held for the Jimmy Dean Museum, which opened two years later on the grounds of Wayland Baptist University in his hometown of Plainview, Texas. Dean's widow, Donna Dean Stevens, was present for the ceremony. The museum houses much of Jimmy Dean's memorabilia as well as a larger-than-life-size bronze statue created by Richmond sculptor Paul DiPasquale and funded by Hillshire Brands, then-owner of the Jimmy Dean sausage brand. The museum is funded by a gift from the Dean Family Foundation.

== Filmography ==
Year	Title	Role	Notes
1963–1975	The Jimmy Dean Show	Himself - Host	
1967–1970	Daniel Boone	Delo Jones/Jeremiah/Josh Clements	
1969	The Ballad of Andy Crocker	Mack	TV movie
1971	Diamonds Are Forever	Willard Whyte	
1972	Rolling Man	Lyman Hawkes	TV movie
1977	The City	Wes Connors	TV movie
1981–1982	Fantasy Island	Charlie Rowlands/Beau Gillette	2 episodes
1987–1988	J.J. Starbuck	Charlie Bullets	9 episodes
1990	Big Bad John	Cletus Morgan	
1990	Murder, She Wrote	Bobby Diamond	Episode: "Ballad for a Blue Lady"

== Book ==
- Dean, Jimmy and Donna Meade Dean (2004). Thirty Years of Sausage...Fifty Years of Ham. New York: Berkley Book. ISBN 978-0425201060
