= Wayland Holyfield =

American songwriter (1942–2024)

- Born: March 15, 1942; Mallettown, Conway County, Arkansas, U.S.
- Died: May 6, 2024 (aged 82) Nashville, Tennessee, U.S.
- Genres: Country music
- Occupation: Songwriter
- Years active: 1970–2024

Wayland D. Holyfield (March 15, 1942 – May 6, 2024) was an American songwriter and leader in the songwriting community.

== Personal life ==
Wayland Holyfield was born in Mallettown, Conway County, Arkansas. He was educated in Arkansas public schools and attended Hendrix College at Conway, Arkansas, before graduating from the University of Arkansas with a degree in marketing in 1965. Prior to his musical career, Holyfield was a wholesale appliance salesman and advertising account manager. His wife Nancy and he had three children, Greg, Mark, and Lee.

Holyfield died at his home in Nashville on May 6, 2024, at the age of 82.

== Early career ==
In 1972, Holyfield left Arkansas and moved to Nashville, Tennessee, to pursue a songwriting career and his first song was recorded in 1973. He received his first number-one hit with "Rednecks, White Socks and Blue Ribbon Beer". In 1975, Holyfield achieved his first solo number-one hit "You're My Best Friend" recorded by Don Williams.

In addition to his collaborations with Williams, Holyfield's songs have been recorded by numerous Nashville singers, including George Strait, Crystal Gayle, Reba McEntire, Barbara Mandrell, Kathy Mattea, Tammy Wynette, Conway Twitty, Charley Pride, Randy Travis, The Judds, Mark Chesnutt, John Anderson, Mel Street, Gary Allan, Johnny Rodriguez, the Nitty Gritty Dirt Band, the Oak Ridge Boys, Ernest Tubb, Anne Murray, and Charly McClain. During his career, Holyfield was writer of over 40 top-10 hits and 14 number-one hits. Some of his best-known songs are "Could I Have This Dance", "Some Broken Hearts Never Mend", "'Til the Rivers All Run Dry", "You're the Best Break This Old Heart Ever Had", "Only Here for a Little While", "Meanwhile", and "Nobody Likes Sad Songs".

In his home state of Arkansas, Holyfield is most famous for his song "Arkansas, You Run Deep in Me", which was written for the 1986 Arkansas Sesquicentennial celebration. It was named one of Arkansas' official state songs in 1987. Holyfield played the song at the inauguration of President Bill Clinton in 1993.

== Leadership and awards ==
Holyfield was the chairman of the Nashville Songwriters Foundation. He was a member of the board of directors of the Nashville Songwriters Association International (NSAI) for almost 25 years. Since 1990, he had served on the ASCAP board of directors, the first Nashville songwriter to do so, and as of 2007, would have served for almost 17 years.

Holyfield received a Grammy Award nomination in 1980 for his participation in the album from the movie "Urban Cowboy", and in 1979, he received the NSAI Presidential Award. Holyfield has won 14 BMI Performance Awards and 16 ASCAP Performance Awards.

Holyfield was the 1983 ASCAP Country Writer of the Year co-winner, and in 1992, he was inducted into the Nashville Songwriters Hall of Fame and the Arkansas Entertainers Hall of Fame.
