= Billboard Top Country & Western Records of 1956 =

Billboard Top Country & Western Records of 1956 is made up of three year-end charts compiled by Billboard magazine ranking the year's top country and western records based on record sales, juke box plays, and jockey plays.

Ray Price's "Crazy Arms was the year's No. 1 record on both the retail and jockey charts.

Several newcomers, including three from the Sun Records label, made impressive debuts:

- Elvis Presley had five records that placed in the top 10 on at least one of the year-end country charts. "Heartbreak Hotel" was the No 1 song on the country juke box chart and No. 2 on the retail chart. "Heartbreak Hotel" was also No. 1 on the year-end pop chart.
- Johnny Cash, landed multiple records on the year-end charts, including "I Walk the Line" (No. 2 jockeys, No. 3 retail) and "Folsom Prison Blues" (No. 19 jockeys).
- Carl Perkins' "Blue Suede Shoes" ranked No. 2 on the year-end country juke box chart (No. 4 retail) and also placed at No. 18 on the year-end pop chart.

In the first appearance by an African-American artist on the country year-end chart, Fats Domino's "Blueberry Hill" ranked No. 23 on the year-end retail chart.

Retail	Juke box	Jockeys	Title	Artist(s)	Label
1	3	1	"Crazy Arms"	Ray Price	Columbia
2	1	3	"Heartbreak Hotel"	Elvis Presley	RCA Victor
3	4	2	"I Walk the Line"	Johnny Cash	Sun
4	2	4	"Blue Suede Shoes"	Carl Perkins	Sun
5	9	13	"Searching (For Someone Like You)"	Kitty Wells	Decca
6	11	22	"I Want You, I Need You, I Love You"	Elvis Presley	RCA Victor
7	8	12	"Don't Be Cruel"	Elvis Presley	RCA Victor
8	6	7	"Why Baby Why"	Red Sovine, Webb Pierce	Decca
9	5	16	"I Forgot to Remember to Forget"	Elvis Presley	RCA Victor
10	17	17	"Singing the Blues"	Marty Robbins	Columbia
11	14	26	"Hound Dog"	Elvis Presley	RCA Victor
12	15	6	"You and Me"	Kitty Wells, Red Foley	Decca
13	16	8	"Sweet Dreams"	Faron Young	Capitol
14	19	NR	"So Doggone Lonesome"	Johnny Cash	Sun
15	7	15	"Sixteen Tons"	Tennessee Ernie Ford	Capitol
16	13	10	"Love Love Love"	Webb Pierce	Decca
17	18	9	"I Don't Believe You've Met My Baby"	The Louvin Brothers	Capitol
18	25	11	"I Take the Chance"	The Browns	RCA Victor
19	22	18	"Blackboard of My Heart"	Hank Thompson	Capitol
20	24	41	"Be-Bop-a-Lula"	Gene Vincent	Capitol
21	10	5	"Yes I Know Why"	Webb Pierce	Decca
22	12	25	"Eat, Drink and Be Merry"	Porter Wagoner	RCA Victor
23	NR	NR	"Blueberry Hill"	Fats Domino	Imperial
24	21	14	"You Are the One"	Carl Smith	Columbia
25	20	33	"I've Got Five Dollars and It's Saturday Night"	Faron Young	Capitol
26	40	23	"Little Rosa"	Red Sovine, Webb Pierce	Decca
27	NR	44	"I Was the One"	Elvis Presley	RCA Victor
28	33	39	"Conscience I'm Guilty"	Hank Snow	RCA Victor
29	23	30	"Why Baby Why"	George Jones	Starday
30	NR	NR	"What Would You Do (If Jesus Came to Your House)"	Porter Wagoner	RCA Victor
31	43	NR	"Love Me Tender"	Elvis Presley	RCA Victor
32	29	19	"Folsom Prison Blues"	Johnny Cash	Sun
33	31	NR	"Mystery Train"	Elvis Presley	RCA Victor
34	44	24	"Honky-Tonk Man"	Johnny Horton	Columbia
35	38	27	"My Lips Are Sealed"	Jim Reeves	RCA Victor
36	27	45	"'Cause I Love You"	Webb Pierce	Decca
37	26	NR	"Just Call Me Lonesome"	Eddy Arnold	RCA Victor
38	35	37	"You're Free to Go"	Carl Smith	Columbia
39	NR	34	"How Far Is Heaven"	Kitty Wells	Decca
40	NR	NR	"You Don't Know Me"	Eddy Arnold	RCA Victor

== See also ==
- List of Billboard number-one country songs of 1956
- Billboard year-end top 30 singles of 1956
- 1956 in country music
