= George Jones Singing 14 Top Country Song Favorites =

George Jones Sings

Compilation album by George Jones
- Released: May 1957
- Recorded: August 27, 1955 – March 19, 1957
- Studio: Gold Star, Beaumont, Texas; Bradley Studios, Nashville, Tennessee
- Genre: Country
- Length: 34:19
- Label: Mercury-Starday; MG-20282
- Producer: Pappy Daily

George Jones chronology
Hillbilly Hit Parade, Vol.1 (1957)	George Jones Sings (1957)	Hillbilly Hit Parade, Vol.2 (1957)

Singles from 14 Top Country Song Favorites
- 1. "Why Baby Why" Released: September 17, 1955; 2. "I'm Ragged But I'm Right" Released: April 7, 1956; 3. "You Gotta Be My Baby" Released: June 30, 1956; 4. "Just One More / Gonna Come Get You" Released: September 15, 1956; 5. "Yearning (To Kiss You) (w/ Jennette Hicks)" Released: December 8, 1956; 6. "Don't Stop the Music / Uh, Uh, No" Released: January 15, 1957; 7. "Too Much Water / All I Want to Do" Released: April 29, 1957; 8. "Cup of Loneliness / Take the Devil Out of Me" Released: October 21, 1957

George Jones Sings is a compilation album released by George Jones in May 1957. The album didn't chart well; however, it plays many of his best early recordings.

== Track listing ==
Side One
No.	Title	Writer(s)	Length
1.	"Too Much Water"	George Jones, Sonny James	2:10
2.	"Don't Stop the Music"	Jones	2:15
3.	"Why Baby Why"	Jones, Darrell Edwards	2:19
4.	"You Never Thought"	Jones	2:47
5.	"No Money in This Deal"	Jones	2:21
6.	"Just One More"	Jones	2:34
7.	"Take the Devil Out of Me"	Jones	2:44

Side Two
No.	Title	Writer(s)	Length
1.	"All I Want to Do"	Jones	2:13
2.	"Yearning (w/ Jennette Hicks)"	Jones, Eddie Eddings	2:54
3.	"Ragged But Right"	Jones	2:24
4.	"You Gotta Be My Baby"	Jones	2:27
5.	"Gonna Come Get You"	Jones	2:30
6.	"Uh, Uh, No"	Jones	2:17
7.	"Cup of Loneliness"	Burl Stevens, Jones	2:24
