= 1956 in country music =

This is a list of notable events in country music that took place in the year 1956.

== Events ==
- January 30 — Despite a 4-inch snowstorm, 17,000 fans attend a Coliseum concert in Denver, Colorado. On the bill are Webb Pierce, Red Foley, the Foggy River Boys, Ray Price, Floyd Cramer, Roy Hill, the Echo Valley Boys and others.
- March 15 — Colonel Tom Parker becomes manager of Elvis Presley.
- March 22 — Carl Perkins is seriously injured in a car accident near Wilmington, Delaware, while en route to perform on The Perry Como Show.
- November 10 — George Jones is named the most promising country and western artist, according to Billboard magazine's annual nationwide disc jockey poll. Elvis Presley is the most played C&W artist.

=== No dates ===
- Although he already has had one No. 1 hit (with "I Forgot to Remember to Forget") and several other smaller-scale hits, Elvis Presley's national star power explodes when "Heartbreak Hotel" soars to the top of all three of Billboard's country charts by the end of March. The song also completes a rare feat by topping each of the Billboard pop and Hot R&B/Hip-Hop Songs charts.
- With release of Ray Price's "Crazy Arms", the 4/4 shuffle is established and would transform country music, especially honky tonk.

== Top hits of the year ==
=== Number one hits ===
==== United States ====
(as certified by Billboard)

Date	Single Name	Artist	Wks. No.1	Spec. Note
February 11	Why Baby Why	Red Sovine and Webb Pierce	4	^{[2]}
February 25	I Forgot to Remember to Forget	Elvis Presley	5	^{[A]}
March 17	Heartbreak Hotel	Elvis Presley	17	Also reached Number One on the Billboard Pop chart.
March 17	I Don't Believe You've Met My Baby	The Louvin Brothers	2	^{[B]}
April 7	Blue Suede Shoes	Carl Perkins	3	^{[B]}
June 23	Crazy Arms	Ray Price	20	^{[1], [2], [A]}
July 14	I Want You, I Need You, I Love You	Elvis Presley	2	Also reached Number One on the Billboard Pop chart.
July 21	I Walk the Line	Johnny Cash	6	^{[2], [A]}
September 15	Don't Be Cruel/Hound Dog	Elvis Presley	10	Also reached Number One on the Billboard Pop and R&B chart.
November 10	Singing the Blues	Marty Robbins	13

Notes

- 1 No. 1 song of the year, as determined by Billboard.
- 2 Song dropped from No. 1 and later returned to top spot.
- A First Billboard No. 1 hit for that artist.
- B Only Billboard No. 1 hit for that artist.

Note: Several songs were simultaneous No. 1 hits on the separate "Most Played C&W in Juke Boxes," "Most Played C&W by Jockeys" and "C&W Best Sellers in Stores" charts.

=== Other major hits ===
US	Single	Artist
4	According to My Heart	Jim Reeves
7	Any Old Time	Webb Pierce
5	Be-Bop-A-Lula	Gene Vincent
6	Before I Met You	Carl Smith
4	The Blackboard of My Heart	Hank Thompson
7	Boppin' the Blues	Carl Perkins
15	Casey Jones (The Brave Engineer)	Eddy Arnold
7	Cash on the Barrelhead	The Louvin Brothers
12	The Cat Came Back	Sonny James
3	'Cause I Love You	Webb Pierce
14	Cheated Too	Wilma Lee Cooper and Stoney Cooper
13	Come Back to Me	Jimmy C. Newman
4	Conscience I'm Guilty	Hank Snow
10	Dixie Fried	Carl Perkins
6	Doorstep to Heaven	Carl Smith
3	Eat, Drink, and Be Merry (Tomorrow You'll Cry)	Porter Wagoner
4	Folsom Prison Blues	Johnny Cash
14	The Fool	Sanford Clark
6	Go Away with Me	The Wilburn Brothers
9	God Was So Good	Jimmy C. Newman
5	Hold Everything (Till I Get Home)	Red Sovine
9	Honky-Tonk Man	Johnny Horton
7	Hoping That You're Hoping	The Louvin Brothers
11	How Far Is Heaven	Kitty Wells
5	Hula Rock	Hank Snow
7	I Feel Like Cryin'	Carl Smith
15	I Gotta Know	Wanda Jackson
2	I Take the Chance	The Browns
13	I Want to Be Loved	Johnnie & Jack
8	I Was the One	Elvis Presley
13	I'd Rather Stay Home	Kitty Wells
7	I'm a One-Woman Man	Johnny Horton
11	I'm Moving In	Hank Snow
14	I'm Not Mad, Just Hurt	Hank Thompson
10	I'm So in Love with You	The Wilburn Brothers
11	I've Changed	Carl Smith
2	I've Got a New Heartache	Ray Price
4	I've Got Five Dollars and It's Saturday Night	Faron Young
5	It's a Great Life (If You Don't Weaken)	Faron Young
11	Just as Long as You Love Me	The Browns
3	Just One More	George Jones
5	Little Rosa	Red Sovine and Webb Pierce
7	The Lonely Side of Town	Kitty Wells
10	Love Me	Elvis Presley
3	Love Me Tender	Elvis Presley
13	My Baby Left Me	Elvis Presley
8	My Lips Are Sealed	Jim Reeves
11	Mystery Train	Elvis Presley
9	Only You, Only You	Charlie Walker
2	Poor Man's Riches	Benny Barnes
5	Run Boy	Ray Price
3	Searching (For Someone Like You)	Kitty Wells
9	Seasons of My Heart	Jimmy C. Newman
4	So Doggone Lonesome	Johnny Cash
2	Sweet Dreams	Faron Young
9	Sweet Dreams	Don Gibson
10	Teenage Boogie	Webb Pierce
12	That's All	Tennessee Ernie Ford
5	These Hands	Hank Snow
7	Trouble in Mind	Eddy Arnold
11	Tryin' to Forget the Blues	Porter Wagoner
9	Turn Her Down	Faron Young
11	Twenty Feet of Muddy Water	Sonny James
14	Uncle Pen	Porter Wagoner
14	Waltz of the Angels	Wynn Stewart
4	Wasted Words	Ray Price
7	What Am I Worth	George Jones
8	What Would You Do (If Jesus Came to Your House)	Porter Wagoner
15	What Would You Do (If Jesus Came to Your House)	Red Sovine
9	Why Baby Why	Hank Locklin
9	Wicked Lies	Carl Smith
10	Without Your Love	Bobby Lord
2	Yes I Know Why	Webb Pierce
3	You and Me	Kitty Wells and Red Foley
4	You Are the One	Carl Smith
10	You Don't Know Me	Eddy Arnold
7	You Gotta Be My Baby	George Jones
6	You're Free to Go	Carl Smith
13	You're Not Play Love	The Wilburn Brothers
7	You're Running Wild	The Louvin Brothers
3	You're Still Mine	Faron Young

== Top new album releases ==
Single	Artist	Record Label
Songs of a Love Affair	Jean Shepard	Capitol
Grand Ole Opry's New Star	George Jones	Starday (debut album)

== Births ==
- January 18 — Mark Collie, country artist of the early 1990s.
- March 26 — Charly McClain, country vocalist of the early-to-mid-1980s.
- June 19 — Doug Stone, popular country vocalist during the early- to mid-1990s.
- July 6 — John Jorgenson, member of The Desert Rose Band.
- July 26 — Scott Hendricks, record producer (Restless Heart, Blake Shelton)
- August 12 — Danny Shirley, lead singer of Confederate Railroad
- September 22 — Debby Boone, granddaughter of Red Foley who enjoyed country success of her own in the late 1970s and early 1980s.
- October 23 — Dwight Yoakam, neotraditionalist since the mid-1980s who helped revitalize interest in the Bakersfield Sound.
- December 9 — Sylvia, pop-styled female vocalist of the early-1980s who became best known as "Sylvia."
- December 18 – Ron White, comedian, member of Blue Collar Comedy with Jeff Foxworthy, Bill Engvall, and Larry the Cable Guy
- December 21 — Lee Roy Parnell, alternative country star who enjoyed mainstream country success during the mid-1990s.
- December 30 — Suzy Bogguss, folk-styled country artist who rose to fame in the early 1990s.

== Other links ==
- Country Music Association
