= Recitation song =

Spoken narrative of a song

Accompanied recitations of poetry or dramatic texts, most often for spoken voice and piano, became very popular in the nineteenth century as an after-dinner entertainment. Jacqueline Waeber has explored how, during the 19th century and particularly in Germany, poetic recitation became increasingly 'musicalized' by the addition of musical accompaniments for the Lied and the musical melodrama, as part of a search for new declamatory styles.

The genre was often looked down on as something for authors and composers of lesser stature, though there are examples by Robert Schumann (Ballads for Declamation, 1850s) and Richard Strauss (Enoch Arden (1897). The English composer Stanley Hawley made many such settings, some of which were performed at the first season (1895) of the Henry Wood Proms in London. His friend Lena Ashwell was often the performer.

In popular music, especially country music, a recitation song or "recitation" as it is more commonly called, is a spoken narrative of a song, generally with a sentimental (or at times, religious) theme. Such numbers were quite popular from the 1930s into the 1960s, although there were only few in number. While they almost disappeared in the 1970s, that decade saw several of the biggest recitation songs of all time: Red Sovine's sentimental ode to an ill child "Teddy Bear" and C. W. McCall's truck-driving saga "Convoy", both songs hitting number one on the country charts and even crossing over into the pop market. McCall, who did not sing, became a popular country star in the 1970s with a string of recitations, most of them comic, although his last hit, 1977's "Roses for Mama" was a sentimental tale in the best Sovine tradition. A number of Elvis Presley's and Johnny Cash's songs, as well as a number of songs from other genres of popular music and a number of gospel songs, also featured recitations.

== Notable examples ==
- "Albuquerque" by "Weird Al" Yankovic
- "The Americans" by Byron MacGregor
- "A Boy Named Sue" by Johnny Cash
- "Colorado Kool-Aid" by Johnny Paycheck
- "Deck of Cards" by T. Texas Tyler
- "Giddyup Go" by Red Sovine
- "I.O.U." by Jimmy Dean
- "The Letter" by Loretta Lynn and Conway Twitty
- "Mama Sang a Song" by Bill Anderson
- "Old Rivers" by Walter Brennan
- "Phantom 309" by Red Sovine
- "Ragged Old Flag" by Johnny Cash
- "Ringo" by Lorne Greene
- "Teddy Bear" by Red Sovine
- "That Was Yesterday" by Donna Fargo
- "The White Knight" by Cledus Maggard & the Citizen's Band

== Semi-recitation songs ==
Semi-recitation songs were also very popular during this period. In a semi-recitation song, the verse, or part of a verse, is spoken and the chorus is sung.

Hits of this nature:

- "500 Miles Away from Home" by Bobby Bare
- "Are You Lonesome Tonight?" by Elvis Presley
- "Big Bad John" by Jimmy Dean
- "Detroit City" by Bobby Bare
- "Don't Take It Away" by Conway Twitty
- "The Devil Went Down to Georgia" by The Charlie Daniels Band
- "The End of the World" by Skeeter Davis
- "Fire Coming Out (Of the Monkey's Head)" by Gorillaz
- "God Bless America Again" by Bobby Bare (1969) and Loretta Lynn and Conway Twitty (1976)
- "Happy Birthday Darlin'" by Conway Twitty
- "Honey Come Back" by Glen Campbell
- "I Dreamed of a Hillbilly Heaven" by Tex Ritter
- "I Gave My Wedding Dress Away" by Kitty Wells
- "I'll Go On Loving You" by Alan Jackson
- "It's Hard to Be Humble" by Mac Davis
- "Leader of the Pack" by The Shangri-Las
- "Little Darlin'" by The Diamonds
- "One Piece at a Time" by Johnny Cash
- "Set Him Free" by Skeeter Davis
- "Still" by Bill Anderson
- "That's When Your Heartaches Begin" by Elvis Presley
- "Tribute" by Tenacious D
- "Uneasy Rider" by The Charlie Daniels Band
- "U.S. Male" by Elvis Presley
- "What Would You Do (If Jesus Came to Your House)" by Porter Wagoner
