= List of Billboard number-one country songs of 1956 =

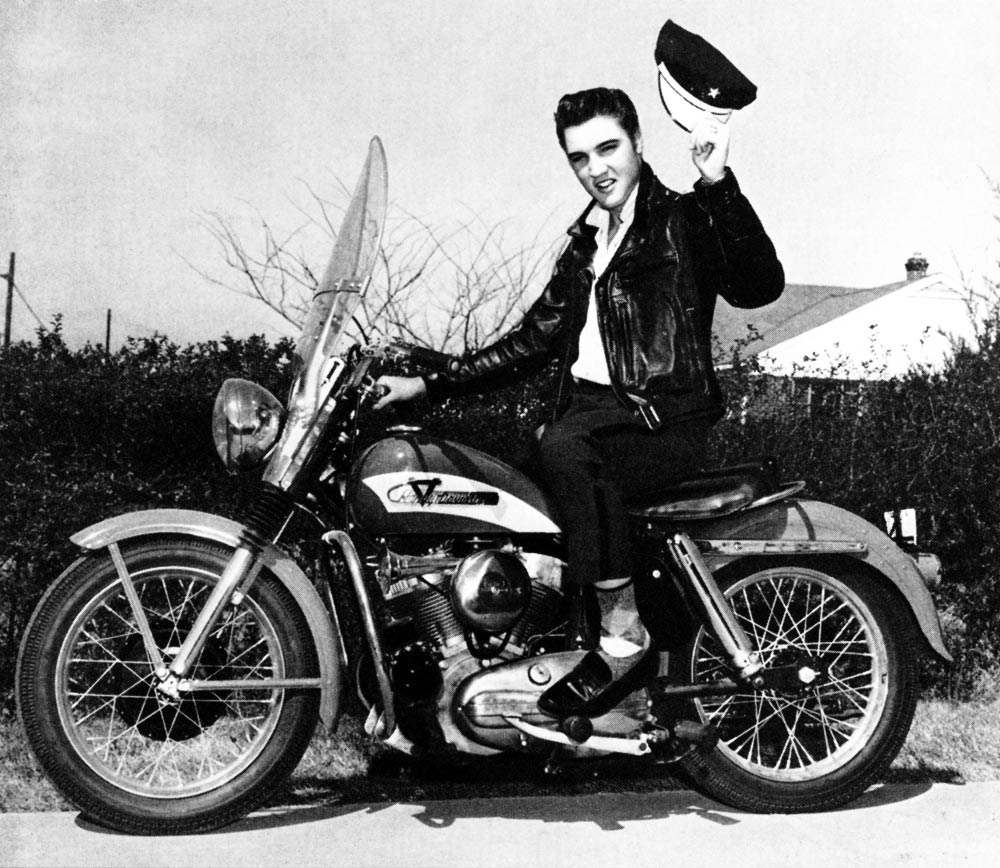
The early recordings of "King of Rock and Roll" Elvis Presley were successful on the country charts, and he achieved four number ones on the best sellers chart in 1956.

In 1956, Billboard magazine published three charts covering the best-performing country music songs in the United States. At the start of the year, the charts were published under the titles Most Played in Juke Boxes, Best Sellers in Stores, and Most Played By Jockeys, with the genre denoted in an overall page heading. With effect from the issue of Billboard dated June 30, the genre was added to the specific titles of the charts, which were thus published as Most Played C&W in Juke Boxes, C&W Best Sellers in Stores, and Most Played C&W By Jockeys, the C&W standing for "country and western". All three charts are considered part of the lineage of the current Hot Country Songs chart, which was first published in 1958.

The number-one positions on both the juke box and best sellers charts were dominated in 1956 by Elvis Presley, who spent a total of 26 weeks in the top spot on the best sellers listing and 28 weeks (including one tied with another single) atop the juke box chart with four different singles. Presley achieved the first country chart-topper of his career in February when he reached the number one spot on the best sellers chart with "I Forgot to Remember to Forget"; its B-side, "Mystery Train" was listed jointly at number one for the first week of the run only. The release was the final single which he recorded for Sun Records, the label for which he had honed his early rockabilly style. After he signed for new label RCA Victor, his recordings began to show more of a pop music influence, but for a time continued to appear on the country charts, and one week after "I Forgot to Remember to Forget" was replaced at number one, Presley regained the top spot with the two-sided success "Heartbreak Hotel" / "I Was the One", which remained atop the listing for 17 consecutive weeks. He would go on to be regarded as the most successful and influential recording artist of all time and feted as the "King of Rock and Roll".

Presley's songs were less successful on the jockeys chart: "Heartbreak Hotel" was his only number one on the airplay-based listing. During the second half of the year, the jockeys chart was dominated by "Crazy Arms" by Ray Price, which spent 20 non-consecutive weeks at number one, a single week short of the record for the most weeks spent atop one of Billboard's country charts by a single song. Despite its popularity on the radio, Price's song spent only a single week at number one on the juke box chart. In addition to Presley, five other artists reached number one for the first time, two of whom were among his fellow members of the so-called "Million Dollar Quartet" of early rock and roll stars: Carl Perkins and Johnny Cash. Perkins gained his first country chart-topper with a song which would go on to be considered a rock and roll standard, "Blue Suede Shoes". Cash achieved the first of his thirteen country number ones when he topped the juke box chart with "I Walk the Line", a track which Rolling Stone magazine ranked as the greatest country song of all time in 2014, and its flip side "Get Rhythm". Price, Red Sovine and the Louvin Brothers also achieved their debut chart-toppers in 1956. "Singing the Blues" by Marty Robbins was the year's final number one on all three charts.

== Chart history ==
In 1956, Billboard sometimes listed both sides of a single jointly at number one on the Best Sellers and Juke Box charts, based on a methodology which combined the survey data for both songs if "significant action [was] reported on both sides of a record". This does not indicate that the single was officially released or promoted as a double A-side.

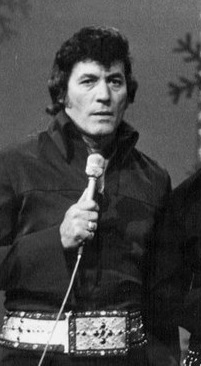
Carl Perkins (pictured in later life) topped the juke box chart with the rock and roll standard "Blue Suede Shoes".

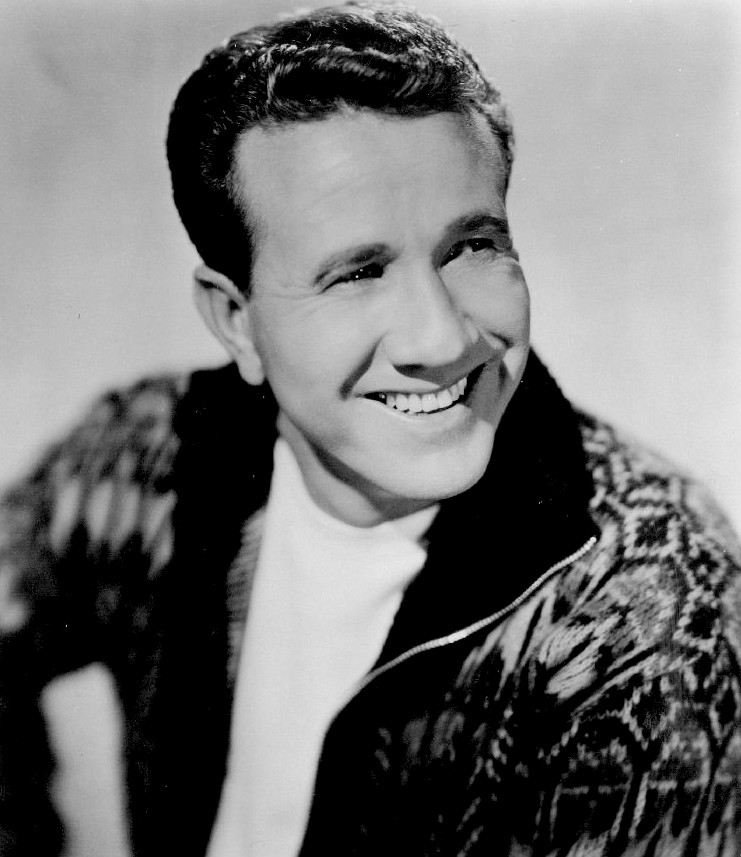
Marty Robbins ended the year at number one on all three charts.

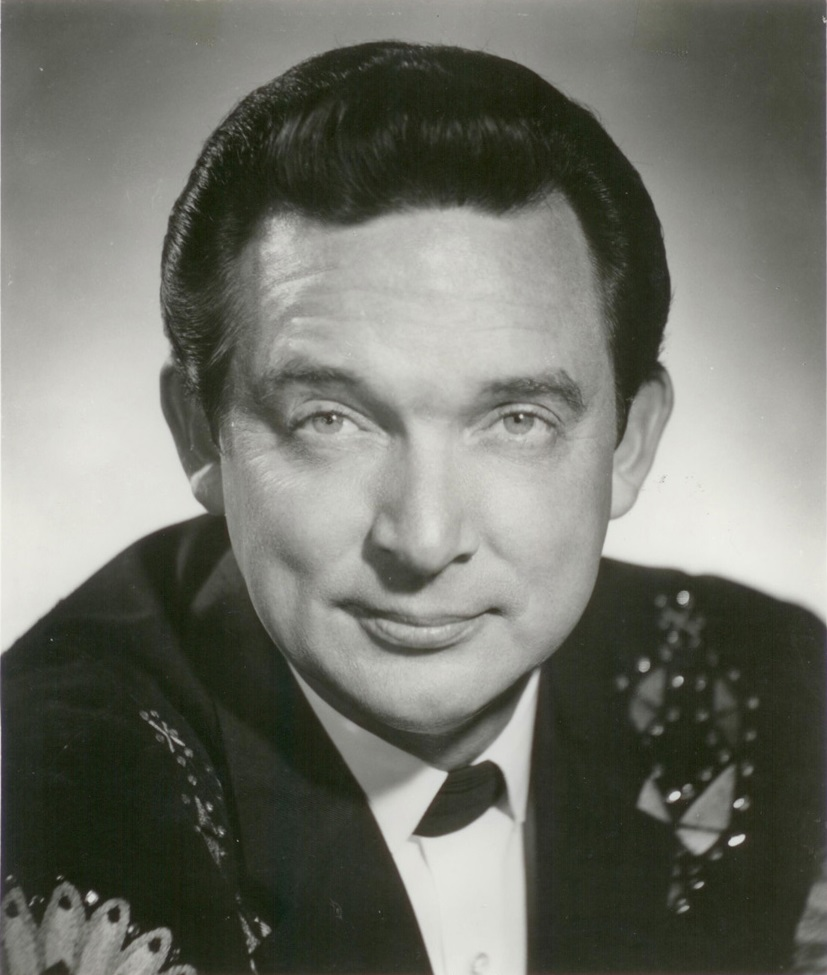
Ray Price's "Crazy Arms" spent 20 weeks at number one on the jockeys chart but only one on the juke box chart.

Issue date	Most Played in Juke Boxes		Best Sellers in Stores		Most Played by Jockeys		Ref.
Issue date	Title	Artist(s)	Title	Artist(s)	Title	Artist(s)	Ref.
January 7	"Love, Love, Love"	Webb Pierce	"Sixteen Tons"	Tennessee Ernie Ford	"Sixteen Tons"	Tennessee Ernie Ford	
January 14	"Sixteen Tons"	Tennessee Ernie Ford	"Sixteen Tons"	Tennessee Ernie Ford	"Love, Love, Love"	Webb Pierce	
January 21	"Sixteen Tons"	Tennessee Ernie Ford	"Sixteen Tons"	Tennessee Ernie Ford	"Sixteen Tons"	Tennessee Ernie Ford	
January 28	"Sixteen Tons"	Tennessee Ernie Ford	"Sixteen Tons"	Tennessee Ernie Ford	"Sixteen Tons"	Tennessee Ernie Ford	
February 4	"Sixteen Tons"	Tennessee Ernie Ford	"Sixteen Tons"	Tennessee Ernie Ford	"Love, Love, Love"	Webb Pierce	
February 11	"Sixteen Tons"	Tennessee Ernie Ford	"Sixteen Tons"	Tennessee Ernie Ford	"Why Baby Why"	Webb Pierce and Red Sovine	
February 18	"Sixteen Tons"	Tennessee Ernie Ford	"Sixteen Tons"	Tennessee Ernie Ford	"Why Baby Why"	Webb Pierce and Red Sovine	
February 25	"Why Baby Why"	Webb Pierce and Red Sovine	"I Forgot to Remember to Forget"^{[a]}	Elvis Presley	"Love, Love, Love"	Webb Pierce	
March 3	"I Forgot to Remember to Forget" / "Mystery Train"^{[b]}	Elvis Presley	"I Forgot to Remember to Forget"^{[a]}	Elvis Presley	"Why Baby Why"	Webb Pierce and Red Sovine	
March 10	"I Forgot to Remember to Forget" / "Mystery Train"^{[b]}	Elvis Presley	"Why Baby Why"	Webb Pierce and Red Sovine	"Why Baby Why"	Webb Pierce and Red Sovine	
March 17	"I Forgot to Remember to Forget" / "Mystery Train"^{[b]}	Elvis Presley	"Heartbreak Hotel" / "I Was the One"^{[c]}	Elvis Presley	"I Don't Believe You've Met My Baby"	The Louvin Brothers	
March 24	"I Forgot to Remember to Forget" / "Mystery Train"^{[b]}	Elvis Presley	"Heartbreak Hotel" / "I Was the One"^{[c]}	Elvis Presley	"I Don't Believe You've Met My Baby"	The Louvin Brothers	
March 31	"I Forgot to Remember to Forget" / "Mystery Train"^{[b]}	Elvis Presley	"Heartbreak Hotel" / "I Was the One"^{[c]}	Elvis Presley	"Heartbreak Hotel"	Elvis Presley	
April 7^{[d]}	"Heartbreak Hotel"	Elvis Presley	"Heartbreak Hotel" / "I Was the One"^{[c]}	Elvis Presley	"Heartbreak Hotel"	Elvis Presley	
April 7^{[d]}	"Blue Suede Shoes"	Carl Perkins	"Heartbreak Hotel" / "I Was the One"^{[c]}	Elvis Presley	"Heartbreak Hotel"	Elvis Presley	
April 14	"Blue Suede Shoes"	Carl Perkins	"Heartbreak Hotel" / "I Was the One"^{[c]}	Elvis Presley	"Heartbreak Hotel"	Elvis Presley	
April 21	"Blue Suede Shoes"	Carl Perkins	"Heartbreak Hotel" / "I Was the One"^{[c]}	Elvis Presley	"Heartbreak Hotel"	Elvis Presley	
April 28	"Heartbreak Hotel" / "I Was the One"^{[b]}	Elvis Presley	"Heartbreak Hotel" / "I Was the One"^{[c]}	Elvis Presley	"Heartbreak Hotel"	Elvis Presley	
May 5	"Heartbreak Hotel" / "I Was the One"^{[b]}	Elvis Presley	"Heartbreak Hotel" / "I Was the One"^{[c]}	Elvis Presley	"Heartbreak Hotel"	Elvis Presley	
May 12	"Heartbreak Hotel" / "I Was the One"^{[b]}	Elvis Presley	"Heartbreak Hotel" / "I Was the One"^{[c]}	Elvis Presley	"Heartbreak Hotel"	Elvis Presley	
May 19	"Heartbreak Hotel" / "I Was the One"^{[b]}	Elvis Presley	"Heartbreak Hotel" / "I Was the One"^{[c]}	Elvis Presley	"Heartbreak Hotel"	Elvis Presley	
May 26	"Heartbreak Hotel" / "I Was the One"^{[b]}	Elvis Presley	"Heartbreak Hotel" / "I Was the One"^{[c]}	Elvis Presley	"Heartbreak Hotel"	Elvis Presley	
June 2	"Heartbreak Hotel" / "I Was the One"^{[b]}	Elvis Presley	"Heartbreak Hotel" / "I Was the One"^{[c]}	Elvis Presley	"Heartbreak Hotel"	Elvis Presley	
June 9	"Heartbreak Hotel" / "I Was the One"^{[b]}	Elvis Presley	"Heartbreak Hotel" / "I Was the One"^{[c]}	Elvis Presley	"Heartbreak Hotel"	Elvis Presley	
June 16	"Heartbreak Hotel" / "I Was the One"^{[b]}	Elvis Presley	"Heartbreak Hotel" / "I Was the One"^{[c]}	Elvis Presley	"Heartbreak Hotel"	Elvis Presley	
June 23	"Heartbreak Hotel" / "I Was the One"^{[b]}	Elvis Presley	"Heartbreak Hotel" / "I Was the One"^{[c]}	Elvis Presley	"Crazy Arms"	Ray Price	
June 30	"Heartbreak Hotel" / "I Was the One"^{[b]}	Elvis Presley	"Heartbreak Hotel" / "I Was the One"^{[c]}	Elvis Presley	"Crazy Arms"	Ray Price	
July 7	"Heartbreak Hotel" / "I Was the One"^{[b]}	Elvis Presley	"Heartbreak Hotel" / "I Was the One"^{[c]}	Elvis Presley	"Crazy Arms"	Ray Price	
July 14	"Heartbreak Hotel" / "I Was the One"^{[b]}	Elvis Presley	"I Want You, I Need You, I Love You"^{[e]}	Elvis Presley	"Crazy Arms"	Ray Price	
July 21	"I Walk the Line" / "Get Rhythm"^{[b]}	Johnny Cash	"I Want You, I Need You, I Love You"^{[e]}	Elvis Presley	"Crazy Arms"	Ray Price	
July 28	"Crazy Arms" / "You Done Me Wrong"^{[b]}	Ray Price	"Crazy Arms"^{[f]}	Ray Price	"Crazy Arms"	Ray Price	
August 4	"I Walk the Line" / "Get Rhythm"^{[b]}	Johnny Cash	"Crazy Arms"^{[f]}	Ray Price	"Crazy Arms"	Ray Price	
August 11^{[g]}	"I Want You, I Need You, I Love You" / "My Baby Left Me"^{[b]}	Elvis Presley	"Crazy Arms"^{[f]}	Ray Price	"Crazy Arms"	Ray Price	
August 18	"I Walk the Line" / "Get Rhythm"^{[b]}	Johnny Cash	"Crazy Arms"^{[f]}	Ray Price	"Crazy Arms"	Ray Price	
August 25	"I Walk the Line" / "Get Rhythm"^{[b]}	Johnny Cash	"Crazy Arms"^{[f]}	Ray Price	"Crazy Arms"	Ray Price	
September 1	"I Walk the Line" / "Get Rhythm"^{[b]}	Johnny Cash	"Crazy Arms"^{[f]}	Ray Price	"Crazy Arms"	Ray Price	
September 8	"I Walk the Line" / "Get Rhythm"^{[b]}	Johnny Cash	"Crazy Arms"^{[f]}	Ray Price	"Crazy Arms"	Ray Price	
September 15	"Don't Be Cruel" / "Hound Dog"^{[b]}	Elvis Presley	"Crazy Arms"^{[f]}	Ray Price	"Crazy Arms"	Ray Price	
September 22	"Don't Be Cruel" / "Hound Dog"^{[b]}	Elvis Presley	"Crazy Arms"^{[f]}	Ray Price	"Crazy Arms"	Ray Price	
September 29	"Don't Be Cruel" / "Hound Dog"^{[b]}	Elvis Presley	"Don't Be Cruel" / "Hound Dog"^{[b]}	Elvis Presley	"Crazy Arms"	Ray Price	
October 6	"Don't Be Cruel" / "Hound Dog"^{[b]}	Elvis Presley	"Don't Be Cruel" / "Hound Dog"^{[b]}	Elvis Presley	"Crazy Arms"	Ray Price	
October 13	"Don't Be Cruel" / "Hound Dog"^{[b]}	Elvis Presley	"Don't Be Cruel" / "Hound Dog"^{[b]}	Elvis Presley	"Crazy Arms"	Ray Price	
October 20	"Don't Be Cruel" / "Hound Dog"^{[b]}	Elvis Presley	"Don't Be Cruel" / "Hound Dog"^{[b]}	Elvis Presley	"Crazy Arms"	Ray Price	
October 27	"Don't Be Cruel" / "Hound Dog"^{[b]}	Elvis Presley	"Don't Be Cruel" / "Hound Dog"^{[b]}	Elvis Presley	"I Walk the Line"	Johnny Cash	
November 3	"Don't Be Cruel" / "Hound Dog"^{[b]}	Elvis Presley	"Crazy Arms"	Ray Price	"Crazy Arms"	Ray Price	
November 10	"Don't Be Cruel" / "Hound Dog"^{[b]}	Elvis Presley	"Crazy Arms"	Ray Price	"Singing the Blues"	Marty Robbins	
November 17	"Don't Be Cruel" / "Hound Dog"^{[b]}	Elvis Presley	"Singing the Blues"	Marty Robbins	"Crazy Arms"	Ray Price	
November 24	"Singing the Blues"	Marty Robbins	"Singing the Blues"	Marty Robbins	"Singing the Blues"	Marty Robbins	
December 1	"Singing the Blues"	Marty Robbins	"Singing the Blues"	Marty Robbins	"Singing the Blues"	Marty Robbins	
December 8	"Singing the Blues"	Marty Robbins	"Singing the Blues"	Marty Robbins	"Singing the Blues"	Marty Robbins	
December 15	"Singing the Blues"	Marty Robbins	"Singing the Blues"	Marty Robbins	"Singing the Blues"	Marty Robbins	
December 22	"Singing the Blues"	Marty Robbins	"Singing the Blues"	Marty Robbins	"Singing the Blues"	Marty Robbins	
December 29	"Singing the Blues"	Marty Robbins	"Singing the Blues"	Marty Robbins	"Singing the Blues"	Marty Robbins	

Notes

a. B-side "Mystery Train" listed jointly at number one in the March 3 issue only
b. Both sides listed jointly at number one
c. "I Was the One" not listed jointly at number one in the April 19, June 16 and July 7 issues
d. Two singles tied for number one on the juke box chart.
e. B-side "My Baby Left Me" listed jointly at number one in the July 21 issue only
f. B-side "You Done Me Wrong" listed jointly at number one in the July 28 issue only
g. The Jockeys and Juke Box charts in this issue have the wrong headings, but which is really which can be deduced from the "last week" placings in this issue and the next as well as the fact that only one of the two charts permitted both sides of a single to be listed jointly.

== See also ==
- 1956 in music
- 1956 in country music
- List of artists who reached number one on the U.S. country chart
