= Hillbilly Hit Parade =

1956 American country compilation album

Compilation album by George Jones, Leon Payne, Bennie Barnes, Joe "Red" Hayes, Jennette Hicks
- Released: November 1956
- Genre: Country
- Label: Starday; SLP-102

George Jones, Leon Payne, Bennie Barnes, Joe "Red" Hayes, Jennette Hicks chronology
Grand Ole Opry's New Star (1956)	Hillbilly Hit Parade (1956)	Hillbilly Hit Parade, Vol. 1 (1957)

George Jones Starday chronology
Grand Ole Opry's New Star (1956)	Hillbilly Hit Parade (1956)	Hillbilly Hit Parade, Vol. 1 (1957)

Professional ratings
Review scores
Source	Rating
Allmusic	link

Hillbilly Hit Parade is a compilation album featuring American country music artist George Jones and other country music artists from the Starday record label, including Leon Payne and Jeanette Hicks. It was released in 1958. The album includes Jones's first chart hit "Why Baby Why" and one of his few rock and roll cuts, a cover of the Elvis Presley smash "Heartbreak Hotel". It is the second studio album release for George Jones.

== Track listing ==
1. "Why Baby Why" (performed by George Jones)
2. "You Are The One" (performed by Leon Payne)
3. "Searching" (performed by Jeanette Hicks)
4. "Any Old Time" (performed by George Jones)
5. "I Take the Chance" (performed by George Jones & Jeanette Hicks)
6. "Conscience I'm Guilty" (performed by Benny Barnes)
7. "Hold Everything" (performed by George Jones)
8. "I Want You, I Need You, I Love You" (performed by Eddie Blank)
9. "Crazy Arms" (performed by Leon Payne)
10. "You Gotta Be My Baby" (performed by George Jones)
11. "I Walk the Line" (performed by Bennie Barnes)
12. "Sweet Dreams" (performed by George Jones)
13. "Blackboard Of My Heart" (performed by Leon Payne)
14. "A Satisfied Mind" (performed by Joe "Red" Hayes)
15. "Yes I Know Why" (performed by George Jones)
16. "Heartbreak Hotel" (performed by George Jones as 'Thumper Jones')
