= Phantom 309 (album) =

Studio album by Red Sovine
- Released: 1967 & 1975
- Genres: Country, truck-driving country
- Length: 32:06
- Labels: Starday Records & Gusto Records
- Producer: Don Pierce

Red Sovine chronology
The Country Way (1967)	Phantom 309 (1967)	Tell Maud I Slipped (1967)

Phantom 309 is an album by country music singer Woodrow Wilson Sovine, better known as Red Sovine, released by Starday Records in 1967 and re-released by Power Pak Records (the budget division of Gusto Records) in 1975 with the same track listing and album art. There was also a compilation CD of the same name issued by Prism Leisure in 2001. The original album peaked at No. 18 in the US country albums chart. The title track reached No. 9 when originally released, and No. 47 on its 1975 release.

== Track listing ==
Side 1

1. "Phantom 309" (Tommy Faile) 3:30
2. "Good Enough for Nothing" 2:13
3. "Three Lovers Were Losers Today" 2:07
4. "Lifetime to Regret" 2:37
5. "That's Me" 2:29
6. "Anytime" 2:24

Side 2

1. "In Your Heart" 2:15
2. "Satisfied" 2:46
3. "A Good Life" 3:28
4. "Same Old Situation" 2:38
5. "Viet Nam Deck of Cards" 3:36
6. "Bummin' Around" 2:04
