= The Deck of Cards =

1940s recitation song

"The Deck of Cards" is a recitation song that was popularized in the fields of both country and popular music, first during the late 1940s. This song, which relates the tale of a young American soldier arrested and charged with playing cards during a church service, first became a hit in the U.S. in 1948 by country musician T. Texas Tyler.

Though Tyler wrote the spoken-word piece, the earliest known reference is to be found in an account/common-place book belonging to Mary Bacon, a British farmer's wife, dated 20 April 1762. The story of the soldier can be found in full in Mary Bacon's World. A farmer's wife in eighteenth-century Hampshire, published by Threshold Press (2010). The folk story was later recorded in a 19th-century British publication entitled The Soldier's Almanack, Bible And Prayer Book.

== Story ==
The song is set during World War II, where a group of U.S. Army soldiers, on a long hike during the North African campaign, arrive and camp near the town of Bizerte (in some renditions, they stop in Cassino). While scripture is being read in church, one man who has only a deck of playing cards pulls them out and spreads them in front of him. He is immediately spotted by a sergeant, who believes the soldier is playing cards in church and orders him to put them away. The soldier is then arrested and taken before the provost marshal to be judged. The provost marshal demands an explanation and the soldier says that he had been on a long march, without a Bible or a prayer book. He then explains that he has assigned religious significance to each of the cards – for example, interpreting the queen as Mary, mother of Jesus. He concludes that "my pack of cards serves me as a Bible, an almanac, and a prayer book."

The narrator then closes the story by stating that the story is a true one, either claiming to be the soldier in question, or an acquaintance of theirs.

== Accuracy ==
The story as told contains an error in the number of days in a year. In a standard deck, there are 220 (4×(1+2+3+4+5+6+7+8+9+10)) spots on the pip cards and if it is assumed that the face cards have 11, 12 and 13 spots respectively, the total is 364. A single joker counting as one spot, however, would make 365. A version of the legend dating to 1865, cites the unreliability of existing almanacs as a justification for this apparent error.

== Cover versions ==
T. Texas Tyler's rendition on 4 Star Records went to number 2 on the US country chart in 1948. A version by Tex Ritter on Capitol Records later in the year reached number 10 on the same chart. Phil Harris also recorded a version in 1948 for RCA Victor.

The highest-charting version was recorded for Dot Records in 1959 by disc jockey and future game show host Wink Martindale, and was performed on The Ed Sullivan Show. Martindale's rendition (titled "Deck of Cards") went to No. 7 on the Billboard charts and number 11 on the country charts in 1959, attained multi-platinum recognition and reached No. 1 on many worldwide music charts. In Canada it reached No. 3.

Red Sovine released a version in 1967 called "Viet Nam Deck of Cards" on his album, Phantom 309. Because the United States was involved in the Vietnam War at the time, Sovine's version modified the lyrics to have the soldier's story take place there, instead of the earlier World War II setting. William York was credited for the updated lyrics on the album.

Bill Anderson released his version in January 1991 and it reached number 60 on the country chart. Because the United States was involved in the Gulf War at the time, Anderson's version modified the lyrics to have the soldier's story take place there, instead of World War II setting. George Morgan was credited for the updated lyrics.

The song was also a UK No. 13 hit in October 1973 for the entertainer Max Bygraves.

The newly published edition of UK hit singles dating between 1940 and 1952, shows the song reaching number 2 for Phil Harris in January 1949.

A Dutch translation, "Het spel kaarten", recited by Cowboy Gerard (real name Gerard de Vries), was a hit in the Netherlands in 1965.

Magician Justin Flom created a magic effect, also based on the song, titled "Soldier's Deck of Cards" which was seen by over five million people online.

A Czech version of this song was recorded on 9 October 1969 in Studio Smečky by singer Miroslav Černý and the band Rangers (Plavci) under the Czech title "Balíček karet". In 1990 Jan Vyčítal published parody version "Paklíček kartiček", where the story was told by Elizabeth T. Taxis Taylor.

In 1974, there was a version in German by Bruce Low. Prince Far I provided vocals for a 1977 reggae cover produced by Joe Gibbs.

A Finnish translation, "Korttipakka", by Tapio Rautavaara was published in 1976.

A French language version — "for the promotion of [the] Cajun French language in Louisiana" — was recorded by Pete Bergeron in 1986 for Bee Records (Church Point, Louisiana).

== Parodies ==
- "Red River Dave" McEnery composed a parody, "The Red Deck of Cards" about a U.S. prisoner of war, who hates cards, because the North Koreans tried to teach him Communism by using a deck of cards.
- Bill Oddie performed a parody version written by Tim Brooke-Taylor and Chris Stuart-Clark, about a cricket bag in I'm Sorry, I'll Read That Again. This same version was also performed by David Frost and released as a single by Parlophone in 1966 with Chris Stuart-Clarke's name being misspelled as Stewart-Clarke. A Parlophone promotional single released on 29 April 1966, exists which has a John Cleese sketch titled "Zoo Keeper" as the A-side, but versions are also found with "Deck of Cards" as the A-side.
- The Soft Boys with Robyn Hitchcock also recorded a parody version, originally an outtake from Live At The Portland Arms. It was released as a bonus flexi-disc with Bucketfull of Brains magazine #23.
- Les Barker wrote a parody entitled "The Franco Prussian War of the Spanish Succession", which was released on Gnus and Roses and (in a different recording) on one of the Guide Cats for the Blind charity albums.
- Max Boyce performed a parody version, with the story and each card relating to Welsh rugby, on his 1975 live album We All Had Doctors' Papers.
