= Yearning (song) =

Single by George Jones, Jeanette Hicks
- B-side: "So Near (Yet So Far Away)"
- Released: 1957
- Recorded: 1956
- Genre: Country
- Length: 2:34
- Label: Starday
- Songwriter(s): George Jones, Eddie Eddings
- Producer(s): Pappy Daily

"Yearning" is a duet by George Jones and Jeanette Hicks released on Jones' debut 1956 album, Grand Ole Opry's New Star. It was released as a single on Starday Records and peaked at number 10 on the 1957 Billboard Hot Country Songs singles chart. Although Jones had previously released a couple of duets with fellow Starday artist Sonny Burns, "Yearning" was his first duet to become a hit, making the Top 10.

Jones released another duet version of this song with Margie Singleton on their 1962 album, Duets Country Style.

== Chart performance ==
Chart (1957)	Peak position
U.S. Billboard Hot Country Singles	10
Canadian RPM Country Tracks	-
