= Seasons of My Heart =

Single by George Jones

from the album Grand Ole Opry's New Star
- A-side: "Why Baby Why"
- Released: September 17, 1955
- Recorded: August 27, 1955; Gold Star Studios, Houston
- Genre: Country
- Length: 2:51
- Label: Starday; Starday 202
- Songwriters: George Jones; Darrell Edwards
- Producer: Pappy Daily

George Jones singles chronology
"Hold Everything" (1955)	"Seasons of My Heart" (1955)	"What Am I Worth" (1956)

"Seasons of My Heart" is a song written by George Jones and Darrell Edwards. The song was released as the b-side to the #4 hit "Why Baby Why" in 1955. The song was also recorded by Johnny Cash and, released in 1960, it became a #10 hit.

The song was one of Jones' best early ballads, included on many of his early studio and compilation albums with Starday and Mercury Records in the late 1950s. The song was even included on his debut 1957 album The Grand Ole Opry's New Star, which was Starday's first album release in the label's history.

== Background ==
"Seasons of My Heart" originally appeared as the B-side to George Jones' first chart hit "Why Baby Why" in 1955. The imagery-laden song was an early showcase of Jones' abilities as a balladeer, although he sang in much higher during this period than he would later in his career. Former Starday Records president Don Pierce later explained to Jones biographer Bob Allen, "Pappy realized George's strength as a balladeer long before I did. He felt that 'Seasons Of My Heart' was a big song. I knew that, in those days, it took much longer to sell a ballad, because it had to make it on the radio first...I also knew that an upbeat song like 'Why, Baby Why' would be easier to sell directly to the jukebox distributors for the beer-drinkin' trade."

== Personnel ==
(For the 1955 Original recording)

- George Jones – vocals, acoustic guitar
- Herb Remington – steel guitar
- Lew Brisby – bass
- Tony Sepolio – fiddle
- Don Lewis – piano

== Other versions ==
- Johnny Cash recorded the song for his 1960 album Now, There Was a Song!.
- Kitty Wells recorded the song as a title track to her 1960 album.
- Jerry Lee Lewis recorded the song for his 1965 album, Country Songs for City Folks.
- Willie Nelson recorded the song for his 1966 album Country Favorites-Willie Nelson Style.
- The Grateful Dead rehearsed the song in September 1969 at Alembic Studios.
- The Grateful Dead performed the song November 2, 1969, at The Family Dog, San Francisco, CA
- The Grateful Dead performed the song January 31, 1970, at The Warehouse, New Orleans, LA.
- Conway Twitty recorded the song for his 1973 album You've Never Been This Far Before.
