= Just One More (song) =

Single by George Jones

from the album 14 Top Country Favorites
- B-side: "Gonna Come Get You"
- Released: October 4, 1956
- Recorded: September 1956
- Studio: Gold Star (Houston, Texas)
- Genre: Country
- Length: 2:42
- Label: Starday
- Songwriter: George Jones
- Producer: Pappy Daily

George Jones singles chronology
"Boat of Life" (1956)	"Just One More" (1956)	"Don't Stop the Music" (1956)

"Just One More" is a 1956 country music song by American artist George Jones. It was released as a single on Starday Records in 1956 reached #3 on the Billboard country singles chart. The song is often featured on his early compilation albums and was one of the most successful of his self-penned songs.

== Background ==
"Just One More" is one of the earliest examples of the "hard" drinking songs for which Jones would become famous. The song describes a lonely, self-pitying man who is drinking to forget his worries:

Put the bottle on the table
Let it stay there till' I'm not able
To see her face in every place
That I go
I've been sitting here so long
Just remembering that you are gone
Well one more drink of wine
Then if you're still on my mind
One drink, just one more, and then another

Although he would adopt a more nuanced, quieter vocal approach in the next decade, Jones' performance on "Just One More" displays his incredible vocal range and power and sounds very much like a composition his hero Hank Williams could have sung. The slow honky-tonk beat is accompanied by a fiddle and steel guitar throughout. Like Williams, Jones had already been tagged as a problem drinker very early on in his career. In the liner notes to the 1994 Mercury retrospective Cup of Loneliness: The Classic Mercury Years, Colin Escott quotes the singer from an interview with John Dew: "[In] the dives and honky tonks the drunks were always blowing foul breath in my face, and the smell of whiskey was enough to knock you down if you hadn't had a few yourself. Drinking gives me courage. I'm easily depressed. I can feel it creeping up, and the best way to simmer down is with a drink."

Ernest Tubb covered the tune in 1956. In 1960 Johnny Cash recorded the song for his LP Now, There Was a Song!

== Chart performance ==
Chart (1956)	Peak position
U.S. Billboard Hot C&W Sides	3
