= Billy Joe Burnette =

American singer-songwriter (1941-2016)

- Birth name: Billy Barnette
- Born: June 21, 1941; Richmond, Virginia, U.S.
- Origin: Nashville, Tennessee, U.S.
- Died: December 29, 2016 (aged 75); Port Orange, Florida, U.S.
- Genres: Rockabilly, Country
- Occupation(s): Singer, songwriter
- Instrument: Vocals
- Years active: 1966-1990
- Labels: Parkway, Gold Standard, Badger

Billy Joe Burnette (born Billy Barnette; June 21, 1941-December 29, 2016) was an American singer and songwriter. He is best known for co-writing Red Sovine's 1976 hit single "Teddy Bear". He also owned the BJB and Teddy Bear record labels, recorded a tribute album to Elvis Presley, and charted the single "Three Flags" in 1990.

== Early years ==
Billy Barnette was born June 21, 1941 in Richmond, Virginia. According to The Roanoke Times, Barnette's unwed mother deserted him in an abandoned house in Roanoke, Virginia, when he was three years old. A family who lived next door took him in and began raising him. Barnette began earning money as a child by working as a shoeshiner. He was cast as Peter Pan in a school play, which led his teachers to encourage him to perform. At age twelve, he got in an altercation with a mentally disabled student at his school. This led to Ann Duke, who taught disabled students at the school, temporarily assuming custody of him as she thought doing so would help improve his behavior. Duke eventually encouraged Barnette to join a group of traveling salespeople who sold magazines, which led to him moving to Denver, Colorado, before returning to Roanoke. After the expiration of Duke's custody, he remained mostly homeless until Roanoke police placed him in the city's juvenile detention center. They would also bathe him and give him money to attend sock hops and other local music performances, which led to him convincing the owner of a local television studio to let him sing on a local program. The owner of the detention center later decided to release Barnette due to him not having a criminal record. Barnette then encountered his biological father, Frank Lee, when walking past a furniture store he owned. This led to Lee gaining custody of him.

== Musical career ==
Barnette began recording rockabilly music for Parkway Records, a Philadelphia-based record label, in the early 1960s. One of his releases for Parkway, the 1961 single "Marlene", was played during the "Rate-a-Record" segment of American Bandstand after release. Due to the decline in the popularity of rockabilly, he moved to Hollywood soon afterward and continued to perform as a musician.

By 1965, he altered the last name of his spelling to Burnette and began performing at various nightclubs in California. He released the singles "Blue Misery" and "Huma La La La", both credited to Billy Joe Burnette and the Stingers, that same year. "Huma La La La" was also recorded by Belgian rock group the Pebbles. A year later, he transferred to Nashville, Tennessee-based Gold Standard Records, where he issued "Lust for Life". In 1967, he appeared as a guest on The Dating Game and The Joey Bishop Show. He also issued a rendition of the country standard "Born to Lose". An uncredited column in the Richmond Times-Dispatch stated in 1969 that Burnette's singles at the time, such as the "Born to Lose" cover, marked a shift from rockabilly to country music, and that many of his singles were played by country radio stations in Virginia.

In mid-1970, he founded his own record label in Hollywood, known as BJB Records. He moved back to Roanoke in 1974, where he continued to work in a recording studio. Burnette also assembled a local country music revue which he called "Direct from Nashville's Grand Ole Opry". Hal Durham, who managed the Grand Ole Opry at the time, asked Burnette to change the name of the show as "Opry" was a registered trademark at the time and could not be used in revues unless at least three-quarters of the performers involved were members of the institution. At the time, Stonewall Jackson was the only artist at Burnette's performances who was a member, although others had performed at the Grand Ole Opry House without formally becoming members.

By the mid-1970s, Burnette had begun working in Nashville as a song promoter for the publishing company Cedarwood Music. He was submitted the song "Teddy Bear", written by a truck driver named Dale Royal. Burnette made alterations to Royal's lyric and submitted the song to Red Sovine, who recorded it. Sovine's rendition of the song was a number-one on the Billboard Hot Country Songs charts in 1976, in addition to reaching top 40 of the Billboard Hot 100.

Following the commercial success of "Teddy Bear", Burnette founded a second record label called Teddy Bear Records, and also wrote the song "Preacher Man" which was recorded by Little Jimmy Dickens. He also became a deputy sheriff in Nashville at this point. After the death of Elvis Presley in 1977, Burnette and Royal recorded a tribute album on Gusto Records titled Welcome Home, Elvis. Vern Nelson of the South Pasadena Review praised the title track as "touching", and thought that the album focused more on the religious aspects of Presley's music than other tributes did. In 1990, Burnette made his only appearance on the Billboard country charts as a singer, peaking at number 90 with "Three Flags" on Badger Records. He continued to perform locally and write songs throughout the 1990s and first decade of the 21st century.

MusicRow reported in January 2017 that Burnette died in his home in Port Orange, Florida of unknown causes. Chart historian Joel Whitburn listed Burnette's date of death as December 29, 2016.
