= Old Rivers =

Single by Walter Brennan

from the album Old Rivers
- B-side: "The Epic Ride of John H. Glenn"
- Released: March 1962
- Recorded: 1961
- Genre: Country
- Length: 2:44
- Label: Liberty Records
- Songwriter(s): Cliff Crofford
- Producer(s): Snuff Garrett

Walter Brennan singles chronology
"Tribute to a Dog" (1962)	"Old Rivers" (1962)	"Houdini" (1962)

"Old Rivers" is a country music song written by Cliff Crofford which tells the story of a man recalling a childhood friendship with an elderly farmer. The song was most famously recorded as a recitation by actor and recording artist Walter Brennan.

Released in March 1962, "Old Rivers" — prominently featuring The Johnny Mann Singers as the backing choir over Brennan's recitation of the refrain — became a top 5 hit on the Billboard Hot 100, Easy Listening, and Hot C&W Sides charts by the end of May.

The song was also recorded by Jimmy Dean, Dave Dudley and Red Sovine.

Country-rock band Alabama used the line from "Old Rivers" at the beginning of their song "Mountain Music": "... one of these days I'm gonna climb that mountain...", albeit via an impersonation of Brennan's voice by guitar technician Bob Martin.

This song is sampled in Dickie Goodman's novelty Break-in record called "Ben Crazy (1962), based on the successful TV show "Ben Casey".

== Story ==
The title character of "Old Rivers" is an elderly farmer, a childhood friend of the song's main protagonist. The protagonist, whose family is very poor, recalls how Old Rivers used a mule-drawn plow to cultivate fields in the hot sun. The mule's name was "Midnight," and together man and mule would plow straight, deep rows for the crops, which was considered as much an indicator of prowess as a farmer as actual crop production. During rest breaks, Old Rivers would sometimes take the boy aside and tell of a place he one day was going to go, by "climb(ing) that mountain." The place is not specifically named, but it can be inferred through the lyrics — "Walk up there among them clouds/Where the cotton's high and the corn's a-growin'/And there ain't no fields to plow" — that Old Rivers was speaking of Heaven.

Years later, the young boy is now an adult and, although having moved away from his dirt-poor farming community, is now a farmer himself and is plowing his own field. He talks about a letter he received from his family back home, by which he learns from his mother that, among other things, Old Rivers has died. The protagonist is deeply saddened by this news, and needs to find shade in which to rest and gather his thoughts and grieve. He is able to take comfort in what Old Rivers one day told him about Heaven.

The story continued with the last track of the album, "Old Rivers' Trunk" (Cliff Crofford, Billy Mize). The narrator goes to Old Rivers' place for a tax auction and buys Old Rivers' trunk for two dollars. The narrator finds the only thing of worth in the trunk was a tattered Bible.

== Chart performance ==
Chart (1962)	Peak position
Canada CHUM Charts	18
UK Singles (OCC)	38
New Zealand (lever hit parade)	7
UK Singles (OCC)	38
U.S. Billboard Hot Country Singles	3
U.S. Billboard Hot 100	5
U.S. Billboard Easy Listening	2
