= Giddy-Up Go =

Single by Red Sovine

from the album Giddy-Up Go
- B-side: "Kiss and the Keys"
- Released: October 1965
- Recorded: August 1965; Starday Sound Studio; Nashville, Tennessee
- Genre: Country, Truck-driving country
- Length: 3:57
- Label: Starday
- Songwriters: Red Sovine and Tommy Hill
- Producer: Tommy Hill

Red Sovine singles chronology
"Hold Everything (Till I Get Home)" (1956)	"Giddy-Up Go" (1965)	"Long Night" (1966)

"Giddy-Up Go" is a country music song made famous by Red Sovine. Released in 1965, the song was the title track to Sovine's album released that same year.

A recitation paying homage to the American truck driver, "Giddy-Up Go" was Sovine's second number-one hit, spending six weeks atop the Billboard Hot Country Singles chart in January and February 1966.

== Story of "Giddy-Up Go" ==
Truck-driving songs had been a part of American country music since the late 1940s, and Sovine's label Starday Records had several artists who specialized in the subgenre. In 1965, though, Sovine, at the time absent from the country music charts for nine years, finally found his niche in this style.

The first big truck-driving hit from Sovine, "Giddy-Up Go", is the tale of an emotional father–son reunion at a highway truck stop. The reunion is played out near the end of the song.

In the setup, the elder truck driver—who shares his experiences in first person—explains that he had spent the better part of 25 years on the road, most of them alone. In the early years of his career, he notes, he had a wife and young son. It was the son's gibberish attempt to greet his father, while driving the truck, that inspired the name of the truck ("Giddy-Up Go"). The stress of her husband's frequent absences eventually takes its toll on the wife and the marriage, and one day, the trucker returns home to find both gone, without contact information or an explanation. In the years following, the trucker is left to explain to other truck drivers the "Giddy-Up Go" nameplate on his truck, his only link to his son.

In the present time, the truck driver is traveling along U.S. Highway 66, when he spots a new diesel rig with a nameplate reading "Giddy-Up Go". The father gets a lump in his throat, suspecting that he may have some connection to its driver. The two drivers meet at the next truck stop, and during the course of their conversation, the boy explains that his mother had died and that he had lost contact with his father. He also reveals that the name of his "Giddy-Up Go" truck was inspired by a rig his father once owned. At this point, the elder trucker takes the younger man outside to reveal their connection, dusting off the name to show him. Afterward, an emotional reunion takes place between the two men, who realize they are father and son.

== Chart performance ==
Chart (1965–1966)	Peak position
U.S. Billboard Hot Country Singles	1
U.S. Billboard Hot 100	82

== Answer version ==
Minnie Pearl recorded an answer version of "Giddy-Up Go", titled "Giddy-Up Go Answer." A departure from her usual comic recordings, Pearl tells the story from the perspective of the manager of the truck stop where the father-son reunion takes place.

The story depicts the woman's friendship with the elder trucker's one-time wife, who had located to the area with her young son when the marriage broke up. It is explained that the woman had a terminal illness that required her to move to a drier climate and start a new life as a waitress. The years pass, her ex-husband never happens past the truck stop, and the woman's condition deteriorates further. On her deathbed, the woman tells her friend that she wishes for her son to become a truck driver, just like his father.

In the years following, the narrator watches the trucks drive by, wondering if the man that was at one time her friend's husband, will ever stop. Then comes the day where she gets her answer, when the two trucks pull into the parking lot of the truck stop; the song ends just as the father reveals the nameplate on his truck.

"Giddy-Up Go-Answer" reached number 10 on the Billboard Hot Country Singles chart in March 1966 as Pearl's biggest hit; it was her only charting single.

== Covers ==
Artists who have covered "Giddy-Up Go" include Dave Dudley, Del Reeves, Tex Williams, Ferlin Husky, and Australian country singer Nev Nicholls. The song also received Dutch covers by Gerard de Vries in the mid-'60s, and later on in the early '90s by Paul de Leeuw, as his character Bob de Rooy. The later version, however, was a satire version of the song.
