= You're in My Heart =

You're in My Heart may refer to:

- "You're in My Heart (The Final Acclaim)", a song by Rod Stewart
- You're in My Heart (EP), an EP by Ten, or the title song
- "You're in My Heart", a song by LL Cool J from Walking with a Panther
- "You're in My Heart" (George Jones song)
- You're in My Heart: Rod Stewart with the Royal Philharmonic Orchestra, a 2019 album by Rod Stewart
