= Teddy Bear (Red Sovine song) =

1976 song by Red Sovine

Single by Red Sovine

from the album Teddy Bear
- Released: June 1976 (U.S.)
- Recorded: 1976
- Genre: Country, truck-driving country, spoken word
- Length: 5:00
- Label: Starday Records 142
- Songwriters: Billy Joe Burnette, Tommy Hill, Dale Royal, Red Sovine
- Producer: Tommy Hill

Red Sovine singles chronology
"Phantom 309" (1975)	"Teddy Bear" (1976)	"Little Joe" (1976)

"Teddy Bear" is a song co-written and recorded by American country music singer Red Sovine. It was released in June 1976 as the title track to Sovine's album of the same name.

The song — actually, a recitation with an instrumental backing — was one of Sovine's many recordings that saluted the American truck driver. "Teddy Bear", released during the height of the citizens' band radio craze of the mid-1970s, is titled after the song's main character, a young paraplegic boy whose semi-trailer truck-driving father had been killed in a road accident, and is left with a CB radio to keep him company.

== Content ==
In the song, the little boy, who refers to himself as "Teddy Bear", gets on the CB radio and asks for somebody to talk to him. The narrator (also an over-the-road truck driver) answers Teddy Bear's call, and listens as the boy tells a heart-rending tale. Aside from his health and the father being deceased, his mother has been forced into the workplace to provide a meager income. Teddy Bear then says his wish had been to go for a ride in a tractor-semitrailer truck (his mother and he were to have joined the father on the road that summer), and is resigned to never getting to realize his dream.

The narrator is so taken by his tale that he decides to risk being late with his delivery to answer the boy's dream. However, when he arrives at the boy's home ("Jackson Street, 229"), numerous truck drivers — who also have been listening to Teddy Bear's call — are lined up at the boy's home, giving him rides in their trucks. The boy thoroughly enjoys his experience. At the end of the day, the truckers take up a collection for Teddy Bear's mother. Later, his mother ("Mama Teddy Bear") goes on the air to express her gratitude, telling them Teddy Bear's dream had just come true. She offers a special prayer to the truckers for their act of kindness.

According to the magazine Country Music, co-writer Billy Joe Burnette was working as a songwriter and promoter for Cedarwood Music in Nashville, Tennessee, when he was submitted a demo recording of "Teddy Bear" by Dale Royal, who worked as a truck driver. Burnette made a small number of alterations to Royal's lyrics and submitted the recording to Red Sovine, for whom he thought the song would be suitable.

== Sequels ==
Two different singles — one by Sovine — were billed as sequels to "Teddy Bear". The two songs told conflicting stories about the boy's future.

Not long after "Teddy Bear" peaked in popularity, singer Diana Williams (who was signed to Capitol Records) released a song called "Teddy Bear's Last Ride". This story, told from the point of view of a friend of Teddy Bear's mother (who cared for the lad while the mother was at work), suggests that the boy's paraplegia is part of a terminal health condition, one that eventually kills him. The song's ending has a group of truck drivers attending the boy's funeral. This song was also recorded by Nev Nicholls.

Sovine's follow-up-of-sorts to "Teddy Bear" is "Little Joe" (the tale of a truck driver's dog that saves his master's life after an accident). In this song, in which Teddy Bear is a character, Sovine says that a miracle occurred and that the boy — now older and apparently healthy — could now walk. Teddy Bear is instrumental in helping reunite Little Joe with his now-blinded master. This song was also recorded by Ferlin Husky and Dave Dudley. Neither song reached the Billboard Hot Country Singles top 40.

== Personnel ==
- Red Sovine - vocals

== Chart success ==
Released in June 1976, "Teddy Bear" was the last of three Billboard Hot Country Singles number-one hits in Sovine's 25-year recording career. "Teddy Bear" climbed to number one in five weeks and was his first since 1966's "Giddyup Go". In addition, "Teddy Bear" was a crossover hit, peaking at number 40 on the Billboard Hot 100. In Canada, the song reached number one on the country charts on its second week.

"Teddy Bear" was certified gold for sales of 1 million units by the Recording Industry Association of America.

The song charted in the United Kingdom five years after its original release, in 1981, peaking at number four on the UK Singles Chart. Diana Williams' song also charted in the UK in the same year, reaching number 54.

== Charts ==
=== Weekly charts ===
Chart (1976)	Peak position
Australia (Kent Music Report)	12
US Hot Country Songs (Billboard)	1
US Billboard Hot 100	40
Canadian RPM Country Tracks	1
Canadian RPM Top Singles	49

Chart (1981)	Peak position
UK Singles (OCC)	4

=== Year-end charts ===
Chart (1976)	Position
US Hot Country Songs (Billboard)	5
