= Too Much Water =

Single by George Jones

from the album George Jones Singing 14 Top Country Favorites
- A-side: "All I Want to Do"
- Released: 1957
- Recorded: 1957
- Genre: Country
- Length: 2:11
- Label: Mercury-Starday
- Songwriters: George Jones, Sonny James
- Producer: Pappy Daily

George Jones singles chronology
"Don't Stop the Music" (1957)	"Too Much Water" (1957)	"Tall, Tall Trees" (1957)

"Too Much Water" is a song written by George Jones and Sonny James. Jones released it as a single on the short-lived Mercury-Starday label in 1957, and it became a hit, peaking at No. 13 on the charts. Like most of Jones's singles to this point, "Too Much Water" was an up tempo honky tonk number in the Ernest Tubb-Hank Williams tradition, although with a slight rockabilly edge. The song was included on the 1957 LP 14 Top Country Favorites.
