= Gusto Records =

American record label

- Parent company: Gusto Records Inc.
- Founded: 1973
- Founder: Moe Lytle; Tommy Hill
- Distributor: Gusto Records
- Genre: Various
- Country of origin: United States
- Location: Nashville, Tennessee
- Official website: Official website at the Wayback Machine (archived 18 November 2015)

Gusto Records is a Nashville, Tennessee–based record company that specializes in reissuing and licensing recordings.

The catalogues that Gusto owns include King Records (except for recordings by James Brown), Starday, Scepter (except for recordings by Dionne Warwick, and the pre-RCA recordings of The Guess Who), Wand (except for recordings by The Kingsmen) Musicor, Chart (except for recordings by Lynn Anderson, whose catalog is owned by Sony Music Entertainment, and a few other artists who bought their own masters), Federal, Audio Lab, Ovation, Step One, Atteiram, and others. Gusto is believed to maintain one of the largest independently owned collections of record masters.

== History ==
Gusto was founded in 1973 by Gayron "Moe" Lytle and songwriter Tommy Hill, who owned the Stop Records label. Tommy Hill operated the business while Moe was still in St. Louis. In 1974, Moe Lytle moved to Nashville and bought Tommy Hill's interest in the company, along with the Stop Records label shortly thereafter. It acquired Starday-King Records from Tennessee Recording & Publishing, which was owned by Freddy Bienstock, Hal Neely, Jerry Leiber, and Mike Stoller in 1975. In the late-1970s, Gusto purchased the Chart and Ovation catalogs. Gusto acquired the Musicor, Scepter, and Wand catalogues from the bankrupt Springboard International Records in 1984, along with many masters that were recorded by Springboard itself. Gusto also acquired Little Darlin' Records and a large classical catalog in the same purchase. The Indigo and Audiograph masters were added in the 1980s. The company’s most recent acquisitions were the Mel Street masters, the Step One master catalog, and the Atteiram masters, which included a large bluegrass catalog.

Gusto owns the longest-operating recording studio in Nashville. Known as Starday-King Sound Studios, it opened in 1952 and was used until 2000 for transferring some of the older style masters to other formats and some new recordings.

Gusto first signed artist Red Sovine in 1974. Moe Lytle was a fan of Sovine's and has claimed that one of the main reasons he purchased the Starday/King masters was so that he could own and market the Red Sovine catalog. The first huge hit recorded and distributed by Gusto Records was Red Sovine's single "Teddy Bear", which was released in 1976 using the Starday label and rose to No. 1 on the charts in seven weeks, which was the fastest rise to the No. 1 position for any country music 45-rpm record released before or since (the Beatles did it on the pop chart in two weeks with "I Want to Hold Your Hand"). The song rose to No. 40 on the pop chart. Most recently, Gusto Records released new material recorded by Porter Wagoner in the five years prior to his death.

Gusto Records does its own licensing, both master licensing and sync licensing, under the name Gusto Music Licensing.

== "Louie Louie" controversy ==
Kingsmen - Gusto 2231 (1984)

Among the master recordings Gusto acquired in the purchase of the Scepter/Wand catalog were those of the 1960s garage band the Kingsmen, including "Louie Louie". In 1993, group members brought legal action against Gusto to have the Wand recordings returned, alleging they had not been paid royalties since 1968. On November 9, 1998, in a story that made national headlines, the Kingsmen were awarded ownership of their Wand recordings.

== See also ==
- List of record labels
- King Records
- Starday Records
