= Carl Hurley =

Comedian

Carl Hurley is a former Eastern Kentucky University professor, and nationally recognized Lexington, Kentucky comedian and lecturer. In his early career, he was often billed as "America's funniest professor."

He is a common entertainer for local events, and is often heard several times daily nationwide on SiriusXM Radio's Channel 98 Laugh USA, and Channel 97 Blue Collar Radio. Hurley is the Author of We Weren't Poor--We Just Didn't Have Any Money, and his entertainment has also been featured in video format.

Hurley was born in 1941 in a log cabin in the Appalachian foothills of Laurel County, Kentucky. In early life, he enjoyed family members' richly embellished tales, and the Grand Ole Opry radio comedians Minnie Pearl and Rod Brasfield. Heading off to Eastern Kentucky University, Hurley worked his way to a M.A. in education in 1966. In 1971 he was awarded a doctorate in education from the University of Missouri in Columbia, Missouri. Returning to EKU as a professor and coordinator, in 1971 his next career started when he decided to "liven up" a boring school conference. Invitations to speak elsewhere followed, and in 1982, Hurley left EKU to speak and entertain full-time.

Hurley displays a trademark story-telling style considered similar by some to American humorists such as Andy Griffith and Garrison Keillor, combining a down-home yarn-spinning style with public comedy. His early work often displayed an impish giggle throughout his routines, which later vanished.

== Video presentations ==
- "Kinfolk & Characters"
- "Off the Main Road"
- "Laughing Matters"
- "Back Home"
- "Sunny Side Up"
- "Southern Fried"
- "Lessons in Laughter"
- "Might As Well Laugh"
- "Country Formal"
- "Live at Renfro Valley"
- "Looking for the Humor"

== Seminar topics ==
- "Success Is a Process"
- "Coping With Change"
- "What Sales People Need to Know About Their Customers"
- "Developing Peak Performance"
- "On a Clear Day You Can See Tomorrow"
- "Helping Skills for Managers"
- "Looking for the Humor"
- "Keep on the Funny Side"
