= Searching (For Someone Like You) =

Single by Kitty Wells

from the album The Kitty Wells Story 1963
- B-side: "I'd Rather Stay Home"
- Released: 1956
- Recorded: 1956
- Genre: Country
- Length: 2:25
- Label: Decca
- Songwriter(s): Murphy "Pee Wee" Maddux

Kitty Wells singles chronology
"How Far Is Heaven" (1956)	"Searching (For Someone Like You)" (1956)	"Repenting" (1956)

"Searching (For Someone Like You)" is a song written by Pee Wee Maddux, sung by Kitty Wells, and released on the Decca label (catalog no. 9-29956). In July 1956, it peaked at No. 3 on Billboard's country and western juke box chart. It spent 34 weeks on the charts and was also ranked No. 5 on Billboard's 1956 year-end country and western retail best seller chart and No. 9 on the year-end juke box chart.

== See also ==
- Billboard Top Country & Western Records of 1956
