= Mel Price =

American musician (1920–2014)

Melvin Edward Price was born on October 13, 1920, in Easton, Maryland. He was an American country musician, singer, songwriter, and radio host. Price was raised on a rural farm and developed an early interest in music, often singing alongside his brother at social and church gatherings.

Price served in the Army in the 35th Infantry Division, also known as the Santa Fe Division, where he often entertained his fellow soldiers with his music. For his service Price was awarded the Purple Heart, a Bronze Star, three Battle Stars, a Good Conduct Medal, a Combat Infantry Badge. He was present at the Battle of the Bulge.

In 1945, he was discharged from the Army and formed a country music band, the Santa Fe Rangers, which he had promised to do while in service. Price's love for country music enabled him to travel around the world entertaining troops for USO tours. The Santa Fe Rangers were the only group with more overseas tours than even Bob Hope, and he had the opportunity to meet and perform with renowned musicians such as Hank Williams, Loretta Lynn, Ernest Tubb, Patsy Cline, and Elvis Presley.

In 1946 Price began a long-running radio show, Mel's Old Country Music Show, which aired every Sunday evening from 5 to 7 p.m. He recorded music from 1949 to 1966, playing guitar, harmonica, and fiddle. He recorded for Coleman, Regal, RFD, Sante Fe, Blue Hen, Starday, Dixie and Redwing records. Price released about 30 recordings over 15 years, and wrote several songs, including "How Many Times", "I Know I've Lost You", and "Little Dog Blues". His music career spanned over 75 years, and even in the last years of his life he continued to host his show on WAAI in Cambridge, Maryland.

Price died on November 26, 2014, in Easton, Maryland, at the age of 94. Two of his sequinEd suits are on display at the Marty Stuart Museum in Philadelphia, Mississippi.

== Personal life ==
In March 1941, Price married Daisy Chaplain, with whom he had two daughters. In 1950, he married Hazel Draper, with whom he had three daughters.
