= No Money in This Deal =

Single by George Jones
- B-side: "You're in My Heart"
- Released: February 18, 1954
- Recorded: January 19, 1954; Beaumont, Texas
- Genre: Country
- Length: 2:16
- Label: Starday; Starday 130
- Songwriter: George Jones
- Producer: Jack Starnes

George Jones singles chronology
"No Money in This Deal" (1954)	"Play It Cool, Man" (1954)

"No Money in This Deal" is the debut single by country musician George Jones, released on February 18, 1954 on Starday Records.

A 1956 rerecorded version of this song would appear on Jones' fourth studio album release in May 1957.

== Recording and composition ==
Just after a 22-year old Jones signed with Starday Records, he went to Beaumont, Texas to record for his first time. In the living room of producer Jack Starnes (co-founder of Starday), Jones and "The Western Cherokees" cut five songs, 2 unissued. The first of the recordings was "No Money in This Deal," a honky-tonk side that was penned by Jones himself. The songs displayed a great Lefty Frizzell influence, in the vocal styling of the early George and in the lyrics. The song was very similar to Frizzell's 1950 smash hit "If You've Got the Money (I've Got the Time)".

Jones mentions his sisters Joyce and Loyce in the song. “Oh, it was just one of them stupid things you write at the time," Jones explained to Nick Toches in the Texas Monthly in 1994. "Bunch of junk. It didn’t seem like junk so much back in those days, but it would be junk today.” Despite being only a regional hit, the song launched Jones' career, although he was viewed as someone trying to sound too much like his heroes, Hank Williams, Frizzell, and Roy Acuff. Jones admitted in his 1996 autobiography: "I can't imagine being as nervous today as I was when I cut my first two songs for Starday at age twenty-two. When anybody gets nervous they rely on their reflexes, and I was no exception."

The B-side included the third song recorded during the January 19 session, titled "You're in My Heart".
