= Ragged but Right (song) =

1956 song performed by George Jones

"Ragged But Right" is a traditional American song dating from the early 1900s. It was recorded by George Jones and released in 1956 as "I'm Ragged But I'm Right". The song is considered one of Jones' best early works, and it was included on his debut 1957 album (as "Ragged But Right").

== George Jones version ==
"I'm Ragged But I'm Right"

Single by George Jones

from the album Grand Ole Opry's New Star
- B-side: "Your Heart"
- Released: April 4, 1956
- Recorded: August 1955
- Studio: Gold Star (Houston, Texas)
- Genre: Country
- Length: 2:13
- Label: Starday
- Songwriter: Traditional
- Producer: Pappy Daily

George Jones singles chronology
"What Am I Worth" (1955)	"I'm Ragged But I'm Right" (1956)	"Rock It" (1956)

"Ragged But Right" is defiant honky-tonk tune dedicated to blue-collar pride. Jones recorded the song in August 1955 and it was released in February 1956 as a single. The song did not chart upon its release but became popular with audiences. He often performed the song live during his early years with Starday and Mercury Records. The song has since taken its place as an early George Jones standard, included on multiple albums and performed live into the 1970s. Jones is credited on his releases with writing the song, but Colin Escott later speculated in 1994, "George probably picked it up from the Gulf Coast legend, Moon Mullican, who played the same spots".

"Ragged but Right"
A 1934 recording of "Ragged but Right" by Riley Puckett

=== Personnel ===
- George Jones (vocal, acoustic)
- Hal Harris (steel)
- Buck Henson (bass)
- Link Davis (fiddle)
- Doc Lewis (piano)

== Other versions ==
- The Blue Harmony Boys version is the earliest known, recorded in 1929.
- Riley Puckett recorded his take on the song in 1934.
- Buddy Jones recorded the song in 1937.
- Ned Haverly sang a minstrel version in the 1951 film Yes Sir, Mr. Bones.
- George Jones first recorded the song in 1956; this version was included on his debut album The Grand Ole Opry's New Star in 1957. He re-recorded the song for his 1963 United Artists album The Best of George Jones. Jones included another re-recorded version on his 1985 album You've Still Got a Place in My Heart.
- Keith Whitley often performed the song live as a member of the New South.
- Moon Mullican had a hit with a version of the song in 1961; it was part of his live repertoire for years.
- The Greenbriar Boys recorded a version of the song on their 1964 album Ragged But Right!
- Waylon Jennings included his version of the song on his 1970 album Singer of Sad Songs.
- Johnny Paycheck included a version of the song in 1978 on his album Live at the Palomino.
- Johnny Cash recorded it for his 1983 album Johnny 99.
- The Jerry Garcia Acoustic Band recorded the song live in 1987; it was released on the 2010 album Ragged but Right.
- Hellbound Glory recorded a reworked version of the song for the 2020 album Pure Scum.
- Shel Silverstein recorded the song for his 1959 debut album Hairy Jazz.
