= Minnie Pearl =

American comedian and country singer (1912–1996)

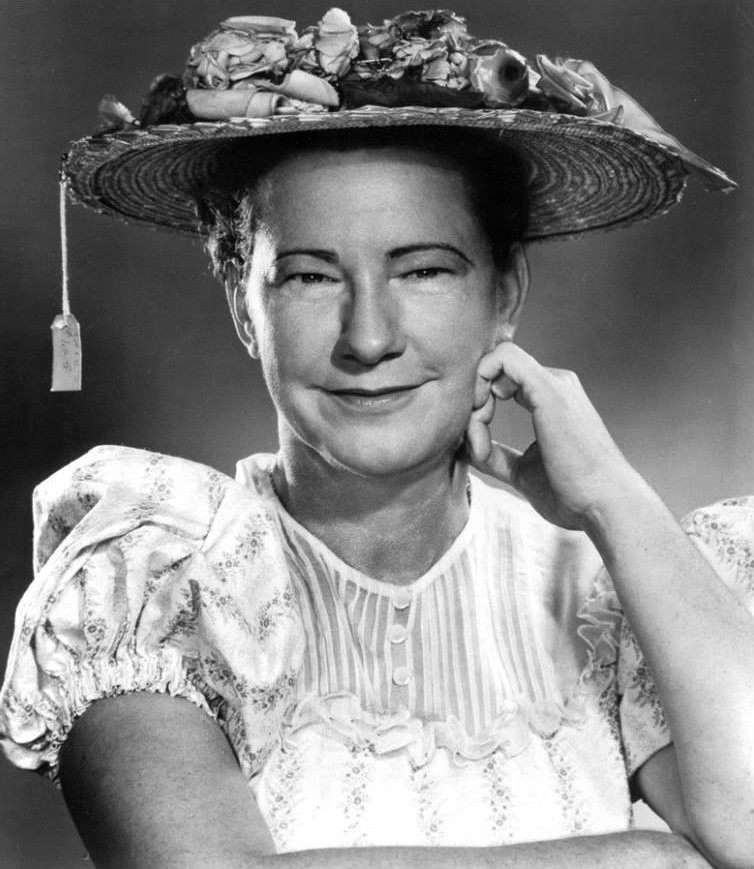
- Pearl in 1965
- Born: Sarah Ophelia Colley; October 25, 1912; Centerville, Tennessee, U.S.
- Died: March 4, 1996 (aged 83); Nashville, Tennessee, U.S.
- Resting place: Mount Hope Cemetery, Franklin, Tennessee, U.S.
- Education: Ward-Belmont College
- Occupation: Country comedienne
- Years active: 1939–1991
- Television: Hee-Haw
- Spouse: Henry R. Cannon (m. 1947)

Sarah Ophelia Colley Cannon (October 25, 1912 – March 4, 1996), known professionally as her stage character Minnie Pearl, was an American comedian and country singer who appeared at the Grand Ole Opry for more than 50 years (1940–1991) and on the television show Hee Haw from 1969 to 1991.

== Biography ==
=== Early life ===
Sarah Ophelia Colley was born in Centerville in Hickman County, Tennessee, 50 miles (80 km) southwest of Nashville. She was the youngest of five daughters born to a prosperous sawmill owner and timber dealer in Centerville.

She graduated from Ward-Belmont College (later Belmont University), at the time Nashville's most prestigious school for young ladies, where she majored in theater studies and dance. She taught dance for the first few years after graduating.

=== Professional career ===
Her first professional theatrical work was with the Wayne P. Sewell Production Company, a touring theater company based in Atlanta. She produced and directed plays and musicals for local organizations in small towns throughout the Southeast.

Part of her work involved making brief appearances at civic organizations to promote the group's shows, and during this time she developed her Minnie Pearl routine. While producing an amateur musical comedy in Baileyton, Alabama she met a mountain woman whose style and speech became the basis for "Cousin Minnie Pearl". Her first stage performance as Minnie Pearl was in 1939 in Aiken, South Carolina. Her character's now-famous trademark hat was purchased downtown at Surasky Bros. Department Store before the show. The following year, executives from Nashville radio station WSM saw her perform at a bankers' convention in Centerville and gave her an opportunity to appear on the Grand Ole Opry on November 30, 1940. The success of her debut on the show began an association with the Grand Ole Opry that continued for more than 50 years.

Pearl's comedy was gentle satire of rural Southern culture, often called "hillbilly" culture. She lived in the fictional town of Grinders Switch. Pearl always dressed in frilly "down home" dresses and wore a hat with a price tag hanging from it, displaying the $1.98 price. Her signature greeting to her audience was an elongated "Howdy! I'm just so proud to be here!" delivered in a hearty holler. After she became an established star, her greeting became a call-and-response with audiences everywhere. Pearl's often self-deprecating humor involved her unsuccessful attempts to attract "a feller's" attention and, in later years, her age. She also spun stories involving her comical "ne'er-do-well" relatives, notably "Uncle Nabob", his wife "Aunt Ambrosia", "Lucifer Hucklehead", "Miss Lizzie Tinkum", "Doc Payne", and, of course, her "Brother", who was simultaneously both slow-witted and wise. She usually closed her monologues with the exit line, "I love you so much it hurts!" She also sang comic novelty songs and often danced with Grandpa Jones.

In 1956, she made a paid appearance – $3,000, plus expenses – at the kickoff event of the first Alabama gubernatorial candidacy of segregationist George Wallace. She also appeared at an event kicking off his 1962 candidacy for governor.

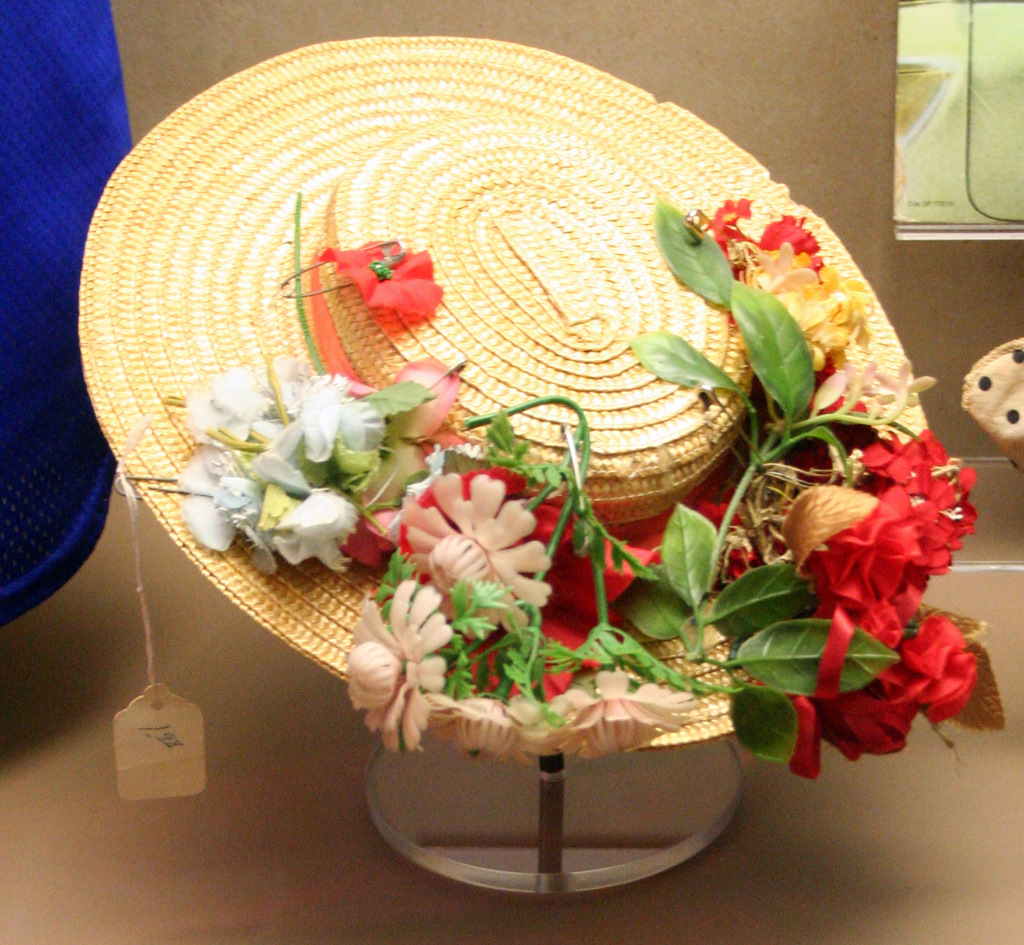
Hat on display at the National Museum of American History in Washington, D.C.

Pearl drew much of her comic material from her hometown of Centerville, which she called Grinders Switch. Grinders Switch was a community just outside Centerville that consisted of little more than a railroad switch. Those who knew her recognized that the characters were largely based on actual Centerville residents. So much traffic resulted from fans and tourists looking for Grinders Switch that the Hickman County Highway Department eventually changed the designation on the "Grinders Switch" road sign to "Hickman Springs Road".

Cannon portrayed Minnie Pearl for many years on television, first on ABC's Ozark Jubilee in the late 1950s; then on the long-running television series Hee Haw, both on CBS and the subsequent syndicated version. She made several appearances on NBC's The Ford Show, Starring Tennessee Ernie Ford. She also appeared as a celebrity panelist on game shows such as Match Game in 1977 and 1978, and Hollywood Squares in 1980. Her last regular performances on national television were on Ralph Emery's Nashville Now country-music talk show on the former The Nashville Network (TNN) cable channel. With Emery, she performed in a weekly feature "Let Minnie Steal Your Joke" in the Minnie Pearl character, and read jokes submitted by viewers, with prizes for the best jokes.

Cannon made a cameo appearance in the film Coal Miner's Daughter, appearing at the Opry as Minnie Pearl.

=== Family life ===
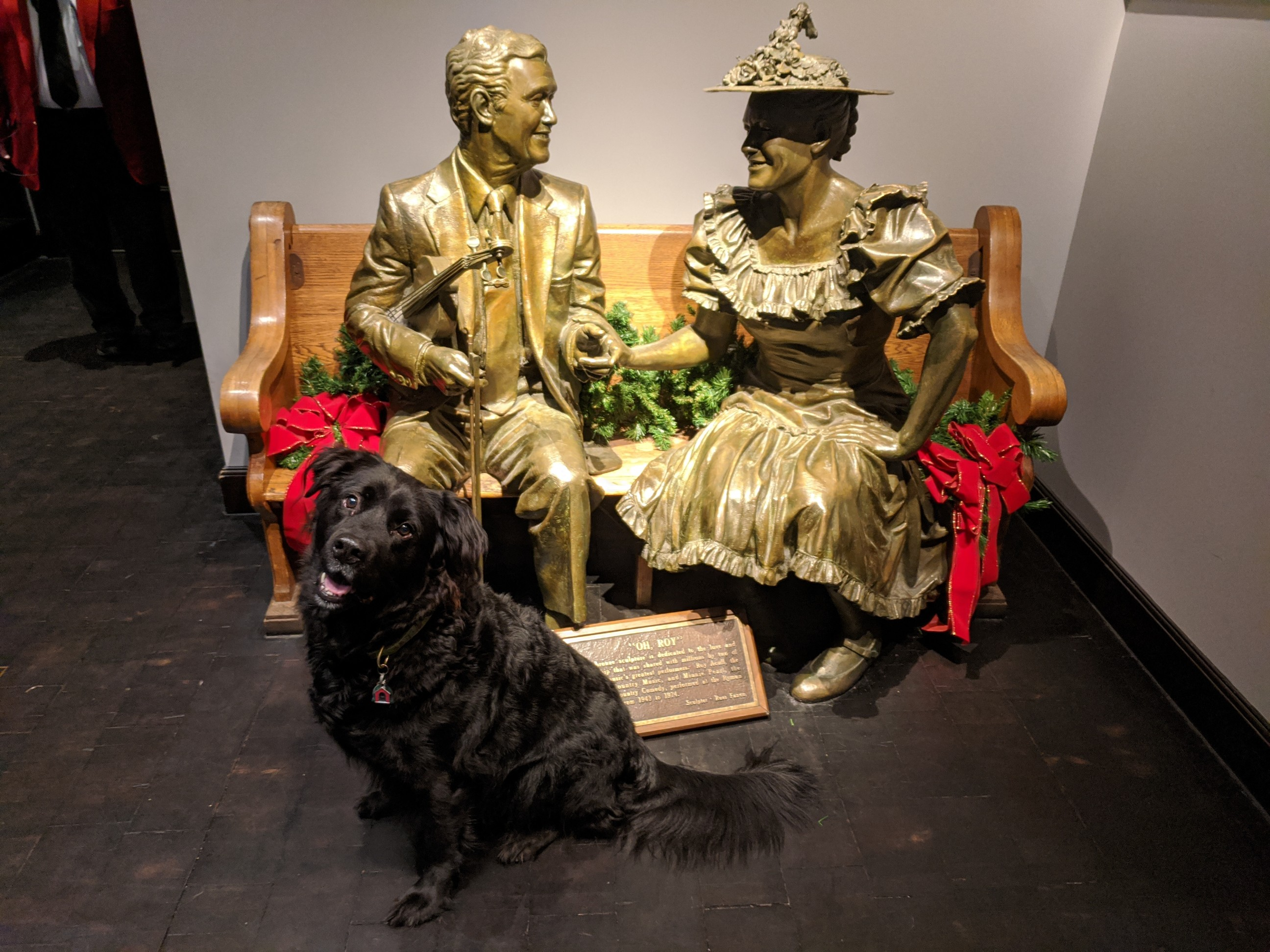
A life-sized statue of Minnie Pearl sits on a pew alongside a statue of Roy Acuff in the lobby of Ryman Auditorium.

On February 23, 1947, Colley married Henry R. Cannon, who had been an Army Air Corps fighter pilot during World War II and was then a partner in an air charter service. After the wedding, Cannon set up his own air charter service for country music performers and took over management of the Minnie Pearl character. His clients in the charter service included Eddy Arnold, Colonel Tom Parker, Hank Williams, Carl Smith, Webb Pierce, and Elvis Presley. The couple had no children. In 1969, they purchased a large estate home in Nashville next door to the Tennessee Governor's Mansion. Cannon attended Brentwood Methodist Church, just to the south of Nashville, where she also donated the pipe organ.

=== Chicken restaurants ===
In the late 1960s, Nashville entrepreneur John Jay Hooker persuaded Cannon and gospel singer Mahalia Jackson to lend their names to a chain of fried chicken restaurants established to compete with Kentucky Fried Chicken. The chain was known as Minnie Pearl's Fried Chicken. After initially reporting good results and enjoying a public stock worth $64 million, the venture collapsed amid allegations of accounting irregularities and stock price manipulation. The ensuing investigation by the U.S. Securities and Exchange Commission cleared both Cannon and Jackson of involvement in financial wrongdoings, but both were embarrassed by the negative publicity.

=== Cancer research ===
After battling breast cancer through aggressive treatments, including a double mastectomy and radiation therapy, she became a spokeswoman for the medical center in Nashville where she had been treated. She took on this role as herself, Sarah Ophelia Cannon, not Minnie Pearl, although a nonprofit group, the Minnie Pearl Cancer Foundation, was founded in her memory to help fund cancer research. The center where she was treated was later named the Sarah Cannon Cancer Center, and has been expanded to at least twenty other hospitals in Middle Tennessee; southern Kentucky; Richmond, Virginia; Kansas City, Missouri; Gainesville, Florida; Plano, Texas; and the United Kingdom. Her name has also been lent to the affiliated Sarah Cannon Research Institute.

=== Final years ===
Cannon suffered a debilitating stroke in June 1991, bringing her performing career to an end. After the stroke, she resided in a Nashville nursing home, where she received frequent visits from music industry figures, including Chely Wright, Vince Gill, and Amy Grant. Her death on March 4, 1996, at the age of 83 was attributed to complications from another stroke. She is buried at Mount Hope Cemetery in Franklin, Tennessee.

== Legacy and influence ==
She was an important influence on younger female country music singers and rural humorists such as Jerry Clower, Jeff Foxworthy, Bill Engvall, Carl Hurley, Chonda Pierce, Ron White, and Larry the Cable Guy. In 1992, she was awarded the National Medal of Arts. In 2002, she was ranked as number 14 on CMT's 40 Greatest Women in Country Music list.

According to Barney Hoskyns, the Band's 1975 song "Ophelia" was based on Pearl. Pearl is also mentioned in the lyrics of the 1988 song "Punk Rock Girl" by the Dead Milkmen.

In 1988, Pearl received the American Academy of Achievement's Golden Plate Award, presented by Johnny Cash, alongside fellow awardee Roy Acuff, at an awards ceremony in Nashville.

She was friends with performers outside the country genre, including Elvis Presley, Dean Martin (she appeared on an episode of The Dean Martin Show), and Paul Reubens (Pee-wee Herman). In 1992, Reubens made what would be his last appearance as Pee-wee Herman for 15 years at a Minnie Pearl tribute show.

Bronze statues of Minnie Pearl and Roy Acuff are displayed in the lobby of the Ryman Auditorium. Chely Wright and Dean Sams (of Lonestar) posed for the statues.

A museum dedicated to Minnie Pearl was situated just outside the Grand Ole Opry House at Opryland USA (next to another museum dedicated to Roy Acuff), but the museum closed along with the theme park in 1997. Many of its artifacts were moved to the adjacent Grand Ole Opry Museum.

== Books ==
Title	Publisher/Studio	Copyright
Minnie Pearl's Diary	Greenberg	1953
Minnie Pearl's Christmas at Grinder's Switch (With Tennessee Ernie Ford)	Abingdon Press	1963
Minnie Pearl Cooks	Aurora Publishers	1970
Minnie Pearl: An Autobiography (with Joan Dew)	Simon & Schuster	1980
Christmas at Grinder's Switch (with Roy Acuff)	Abingdon Press	1985
Best Jokes Minnie Pearl Ever Told (Plus a Few She Overheard!) (compiled by Kevin Kenworthy)	Rutledge Hill Press	1999

== Recordings ==
=== Albums ===
Title	Record label	Copyright
Howdy!	Sunset	1960
America's Beloved Minnie Pearl	Starday	1965
The Country Music Story	Starday	1966
Lookin' Fer a Feller	Starday	1967
Grandpa Jones and Minnie Pearl	RCA Camden	1973

=== Selected guest appearances on albums ===
This list includes guest appearances on other stars' albums or appearances on "various artists" compilation albums.

Title	Record label	Copyright
Country Music Caravan	RCA Victor	1954
Hall of Fame (Vol. 9), (contributor)	Starday	c. 1969
Thunder on the Road	Starday	c. 1970
Stars of the Grand Ole Opry	RCA	1974
Live at the Grand Ole Opry (With Hank Williams)	MGM	1976
New Harvest...First Gathering (Dolly Parton album; appears on the track "Applejack")	RCA	1977
Backstage at the Grand Ole Opry	RCA	1980
Surely You Joust (Ray Stevens album; appears on the track "Southern Air")	MCA	1986
Out Among the Stars (Posthumous Johnny Cash album; appears on the track "If I Told You Who It Was", recorded in the 1980s)	Columbia Records	2014

=== Singles ===
Minnie Pearl released a number of single records for RCA Victor during the 1950s, including a few duets with Grandpa Jones. During this period, she also made guest appearances on records by Chet Atkins and Ernest Tubb. In the 1960s, she moved to Starday Records. At age 54, she recorded a top-10 hit for Starday, "Giddyup Go – Answer", a response to Red Sovine's classic "Giddyup Go". She later recorded with Sovine and Buddy Starcher in other single releases.

Pearl was back on RCA in 1974 when Archie Campbell and she released a parody record of Loretta Lynn and Conway Twitty's hit "As Soon As I Hang Up the Phone" which received airplay, but did not chart. In 1977, she appeared with a number of other Opry members on Dolly Parton's New Harvest...First Gathering album, singing on the song "Applejack". In 1986, she was a featured guest vocalist, along with Jerry Clower, on the Ray Stevens comedy single entitled "Southern Air". It charted in the top 70 of Billboard.

Year	Title	US Country
1966	"Giddyup Go – Answer"	10
