= Don't Stop the Music (George Jones song) =

Single by George Jones

from the album George Jones Singing 14 Top Country Favorites
- A-side: "Uh, Uh, No"
- Released: 1957
- Recorded: 1956
- Studio: Gold Star (Houston, Texas)
- Genre: Country
- Length: 2:16
- Label: Mercury-Starday
- Songwriter: George Jones
- Producer: Pappy Daily

George Jones singles chronology
"Just One More" (1956)	"Don't Stop the Music" (1957)	"Too Much Water" (1957)

"Don't Stop the Music" is a song written and recorded by George Jones. It was his first single release on Mercury-Starday and peaked at #10 on the country singles chart in early 1957.

== Background ==
In late 1956, there were shakeups in some of the top management jobs in Nashville and part of this realignment saw Starday Records, an independent country music label founded in Houston by Jones's producer and mentor H.W. "Pappy" Daily and Jack Starnes, absorbed into Mercury Records. As Colin Escott writes in the liner notes to the Jones retrospective Cup of Loneliness: The Classic Mercury Years, Daily and Starday president Don Pierce were approached to take over Mercury's country roster to form the Mercury-Starday label but "the clincher was the success of George Jones. After 12 years in the business, Mercury hadn't found one country artist who had promised or delivered half of what George had." By July 1958, Mercury-Starday dissolved with Pierce assuming control of Starday and Jones remaining at Mercury with Daily producing him. Like his earlier single "Just One More", "Don't Stop the Music" sounds remarkably like a Hank Williams song, with Jones quickly earning a reputation as one of the best practitioners of the honky tonk sound in the late 1950s. It was released as the B-side to the up tempo "Uh, Uh, No," but the cry-in-your-beer ballad outperformed the A-side on the charts, making the top ten.
