= Phantom 309 =

Single by Red Sovine
- Released: 1967 (U.S.)
- Recorded: 1967
- Genre: Truck-driving country
- Length: 3:23
- Label: Starday Records
- Songwriter: Tommy Faile
- Producer: Don Pierce

"Phantom 309" is a song written by Tommy Faile and released as a single by Red Sovine in 1967. It was a minor hit, peaking at number nine on the Billboard country chart. The lyrics are spoken, rather than sung.

== Content ==
The song tells of a hitchhiker (the singer, in first person) trying to return home from the West Coast. On the third day of his trip, while at a crossroads in a driving rain, the hitchhiker is picked up by "Big Joe" driving his tractor-trailer named Phantom 309. After driving through the night, Big Joe drops the hitchhiker off at a truck stop, gives him a dime for a cup of coffee, then disappears out of sight.

Once inside, the hitchhiker tells of Big Joe's generosity, and the waiter tells him he had been the beneficiary of a "ghost driver" (a variant of the vanishing hitchhiker/truck driver urban legend). Ten years earlier, at the same intersection where he was picked up, Big Joe had swerved to avoid hitting a school bus-full of children because he could not stop due to his truck's momentum. In doing so, though, he had lost control of his truck and crashed; he had died in the wreck. The waiter tells the hiker that he was not the first; the ghost of Big Joe had been known to pick up other hitchhikers over the years.

== Tom Waits version ==
The song was covered with slightly reworked lyrics by Tom Waits in July 1975 at Record Plant Studios in Los Angeles and released in October on his third album, the pseudo-live double-LP Nighthawks at the Diner, under the title "Big Joe and Phantom 309". (To establish mood for the studio audience, Waits refers to the studio as Raphael's Silver Cloud Lounge on the album's first track). This version was covered by Archers of Loaf on 1995's Step Right Up: The Songs of Tom Waits.

== Other covers ==
Other artists who have recorded "Phantom 309" include Dave Dudley, Del Reeves, Ferlin Husky, and Boxcar Willie. Johnny Cash's song "Like the 309", posthumously released in 2006's American V: A Hundred Highways, pays tribute to the original. Stan Ridgway's 1986 UK top-five hit "Camouflage", about a ghostly marine, was inspired in part by this song. In 1981, the Dutch song "Stille Willie" ("Silent William") by the B.B. Band (Bill Bradley Band) tells the same story.

== Cultural allusions ==
The song is a version of the vanishing hitchhiker ghost story, but in this case the driver, not the hitchhiker, is the ghost.

In the movie Pee-wee's Big Adventure, protagonist Pee-wee Herman, hitchhiking at night, is given a ride by trucker Large Marge, who proceeds to tell him of a horrible accident that occurred on the night in question years before, scaring him so that he requests to be let off sooner than he planned. Arriving at a truck stop, she advises him to tell the wait staff that Large Marge sent him, and drives away cackling. When he walks in the restaurant and mentions her name, the staff and regulars confirm that Marge perished in that very accident.

In the movie Trailer Park Boys: Don't Legalize It, "Phantom 309" is the background music to the introductory scene at Ray's funeral. The song also reoccurs (continuing where it left off in the intro) later in the film when Bubbles contemplates leaving Ricky and Julian to live in the school bus his parents left him in their will. The song was referenced beforehand in the show, as well, during episode six of season five, "Don't Cross the Sh*t Line". While in J-ROCs trailer filming a "greasy film", Ray drinks a whole quart of liquor and rolls backwards into the shot where Bubbles is introducing himself in Trailer Park Girls Gone Wild, where J-ROC calls Ray a " 'Phantom 309'-lookin' mah-f**ker."

In Grand Theft Auto IV and V, the Jobuilt Phantom is a conventional-cab sleeper truck based on the Peterbilt 379.
