= What Am I Worth =

"What Am I Worth" "What I'm Worth"

Single by George Jones

from the album Grand Ole Opry's New Star
- B-side: "Still Hurtin'"
- Released: January 14, 1956
- Recorded: August 27, 1955
- Studio: Gold Star (Houston, Texas)
- Genre: Country
- Length: 2:34
- Label: Starday
- Songwriters: George Jones, Darrell Edwards
- Producer: Pappy Daily

George Jones singles chronology
"Why Baby Why" (1955)	"What Am I Worth" "What I'm Worth" (1956)	"I'm Ragged But I'm Right" (1956)

"What Am I Worth" is a 1956 country music song released by George Jones, co-written by Jones and Darrell Edwards. The song was released on January 14, 1956, and was one of the fourteen songs included on Jones' debut album with Starday Records in 1957.

== Composition ==
"What Am I Worth" was written by Jones and Darrell Edwards, who had also collaborated on Jones previous single "Why Baby Why," which became the singer's first national chart hit. According to Bob Allen's book George Jones: The Life and Times of a Honky Tonk Legend, Edwards had grown up just across the road from Jones near Saratoga, Texas, and, after a stint in the Coast Guard, tracked Jones down after a show in Beaumont and showed him several poems he had written, instigating a songwriting partnership. Jones and Edwards would collaborate on some of George's biggest early hits, including his second #1 hit "Tender Years." "What Am I Worth" peaked at #7 on the country singles chart. Years later, Jones would recut the song again during his tenure with the Musicor label.
