= Tommy Faile =

American songwriter (1928–1998)

- Born: September 15, 1928; Lancaster, South Carolina, U.S.
- Died: August 2, 1998 (aged 69); Gaston County, North Carolina, U.S.
- Genres: Country
- Occupation(s): Songwriter, singer
- Years active: 1946–1990s
- Formerly of: Arthur "Guitar Boogie" Smith, Snuffy Jenkins

Tommy Faile (September 15, 1928 – August 2, 1998) was an American songwriter and singer best known for composing "Phantom 309", singing "The Legend of the Brown Mountain Lights", his deep voice and comic onstage banter.

Born in Lancaster, South Carolina, Faile got his start on local radio in 1946 with Snuffy Jenkins, Homer Sherrill and the Hired Hands on WIS in Columbia, South Carolina. He was heard on national radio in 1949 on "Philip Morris Night with Horace Heidt".

In 1951, Faile joined Arthur "Guitar Boogie" Smith's Crackerjacks as a bass player and singer. He also sang bass for Smith's gospel group, The Crossroads Quartet. They remained together for 18 years, until he landed his own show in the early 1970s on WBTV in Charlotte, North Carolina. In 1995, he joined Curly Howard's radio program on WKMT. He died of a heart attack in 1998.
