= I Gotta Know (Wanda Jackson song) =

Single by Wanda Jackson

from the album Rockin' with Wanda
- B-side: "Half As Good A Girl"
- Released: 1956
- Recorded: 1956
- Genre: Rockabilly
- Length: 2:29
- Label: Capitol Records
- Songwriter(s): Thelma Blackmon

Wanda Jackson singles chronology
"Wasted" (1956)	"I Gotta Know" (1956)	"Hot Dog! That Made Him Mad" (1956)

"I Gotta Know" is a rockabilly song recorded by Wanda Jackson in 1956, and released as a single by Capitol Records as 45-15586. It was written by Thelma Blackmon. Jackson's version of the song reached #15 on the Billboard Country Singles chart. It was later included in the 1960 album Rockin' with Wanda.

== Critical response ==
Buzz McClain of The Washington Post called Jackson's version "a hook-filled number that zips from ballad to rocker and back again."

Iain Ellis of PopMatters described Jackson's performance: "Honing her Elvis-style hiccup vocal, Jackson satirized the prevailing male hits of the day, songs that posited either romantic illusions or 'cool' boasting. Rather than passively wallowing in these conceits, or swallowing their deceits, Jackson set to de-bunking them with brutal 'response' lyrics."

Billy Poore wrote that it "starts out like a sad, sappy country ballad, and then all of a sudden, Wanda just roars into the meat and potatoes boppin' rockabilly sound."

== Chart performance ==
Chart (1956)	Peak position
U.S. Billboard Most Played C&W in Juke Boxes	15
