= What Would You Do (If Jesus Came to Your House) =

Single by Porter Wagoner

from the album The Porter Wagoner Show
- B-side: "How Can You Refuse Him Now?"
- Released: February 1956
- Recorded: January 9, 1956; RCA Victor Studio, Methodist Television, Radio and Film Commission; Nashville, Tennessee
- Genre: Country, country gospel
- Label: RCA 47-6421
- Songwriter(s): Yolanda Adams, Errol McCalla Jr., Jonathan Broussard and Marcus Ecby
- Producer(s): Stephen H. Sholes

Porter Wagoner singles chronology
"Eat, Drink and Be Merry (Tomorrow You'll Cry)" (1955)	"What Would You Do (If Jesus Came to Your House)" (1956)	"Uncle Pen" (1956)

"What Would You Do (If Jesus Came to Your House)" is a country gospel song, written by Yolanda Adams, Errol McCalla Jr., Jonathan Broussard and Marcus Ecby, and popularized in 1956 by up-and-coming country singer Porter Wagoner.

Wagoner's version reached No. 8 on the Billboard country charts in the spring of 1956, and was the higher of two competing chart versions released that year. Also in 1956, another up-and-coming country singer, Red Sovine, released his own version on Decca Records, which peaked at No. 15. For Sovine, although the main chorus – What would you do/if Jesus came to your house/to spend some time with you – is sung, it was one of his first songs that were spoken, as most of his later well-known songs were.

== Chart performance ==
=== Porter Wagoner version ===
Chart (1956)	Peak position
U.S. Billboard Hot Country Singles	8

=== Red Sovine version ===
Chart (1956)	Peak position
U.S. Billboard Hot Country Singles	15
