= I Take the Chance =

Single by The Browns
- B-side: "Goo Goo Dada"
- Released: 1956
- Genre: Country
- Length: 2:38
- Label: RCA Victor Records
- Songwriter(s): Ira Louvin & Charlie Louvin

The Browns singles chronology
"Here Today and Gone Tomorrow" (1955)	"I Take the Chance" (1956)	"Just as Long as You Love Me" (1956)

"I Take the Chance" is a song written by The Louvin Brothers, which was released in 1956 by The Browns. The song spent 21 weeks on the Billboard survey of "Most Played C&W by Jockeys", reaching No. 2, while spending 24 weeks on the Billboard survey of "C&W Best Sellers in Stores", reaching No. 6, and reaching No. 9 on the Billboard survey of "Most Played C&W in Juke Boxes".

== Chart performance ==
Chart (1956)	Peak position
US Billboard - Most Played C&W by Jockeys	2
US Billboard - C&W Best Sellers in Stores	6
US Billboard - Most Played C&W in Juke Boxes	9

== Cover versions ==
- Ernest Ashworth released a cover of the song in 1962, which reached No. 7 on the Billboard "Hot Country Singles" chart.
