= Love Love Love (Webb Pierce song) =

1955 single by Webb Pierce

"Love Love Love" is a 1955 single by Webb Pierce, written by Ted Jarrett. "Love Love Love" spent eight weeks at number one on the country charts and spent a total of thirty-two weeks on the charts.
