= I Was the One =

Single by Elvis Presley
- A-side: "Heartbreak Hotel"
- Recorded: January 11, 1956
- Genre: Rockabilly
- Length: 2:31
- Label: RCA Victor
- Songwriters: Aaron Schroeder; Bill Peppers; Claude Demetrius; Hal Blair
- Producer: Steve Sholes

"I Was the One" is a song by Elvis Presley, written by Aaron Schroeder, Bill Peppers, Claude Demetrius and Hal Blair.

Presley recorded it at RCA's Studios, Nashville, on January 11, 1956. It was released as the B-side of the "Heartbreak Hotel" single (RCA Victor 20-6420 (78 rpm record) and RCA Victor 47-6420 (single)) in 1956, and was produced by Steve Sholes.

== Other versions ==
Swedish band Streaplers has also recorded the song. It was released on the LP Speed (Bohus Bglp 5010) in 1978. Country musician Jimmie Dale Gilmore also recorded a version on his album, Spinning Around the Sun.
