= Grand Ole Opry's New Star =

Studio album by George Jones
- Released: November 1956
- Recorded: January 19, 1954 – August 1956
- Studio: Gold Star (Houston, Texas)
- Genre: Country
- Length: 34:14
- Label: Starday; SLP-101
- Producer: Pappy Daily

George Jones chronology
Grand Ole Opry's New Star (1956)	Hillbilly Hit Parade (1956)

Singles from The Grand Ole Opry's New Star
- 1. "Play It Cool, Man" Released: May 29, 1954; 2. "Let Him Know" Released: July 16, 1954, September 25, 1954; 3. "Hold Everything" Released: April 14, 1955; 4. "Why Baby Why" Released: August 27, 1955; 5. "What Am I Worth" Released: January 14, 1956; 6. "I'm Ragged But I'm Right" Released: April 7, 1956; 7. "You Gotta Be My Baby" Released: June 30, 1956; 8. "Boat of Life" Released: August 11, 1956

Professional ratings
Review scores
Source	Rating
Allmusic	3/5 stars

Grand Ole Opry's New Star is the debut studio album released by George Jones in November 1956 with Starday Records. Produced by Jones' manager Pappy Daily, the album was recorded during early sessions in 1954, throughout 1955, and other sessions in 1956. It is also the first album to be released on the Starday label, a label only four years old.

== Background ==
Starday Records was an independent record label in Houston that was co-founded by Jones's producer and mentor H. W. "Pappy" Daily and Jack Starnes. Jones's first recording, the self-penned novelty "No Money in This Deal", had appeared in February 1954 and in 1955 he scored his first hit with "Why Baby Why", which would be the lead track on Grand Ole Opry's New Star. The title reflected Jones's 1956 appearance on the Grand Ole Opry, which solidified his emerging status in the country music world. Extant copies of Grand Ole Opry's New Star are rare, and collector's prices are $400 and up.

"Play It Cool, Man" was released as his second single on May 29, 1954 on Starday Records. It is the oldest recording to be included on his debut album in 1956.

== Recording and composition ==
Jones wrote or co-wrote all fourteen songs on the album, which included three of his early top-10 country hits: "Why Baby Why", "What Am I Worth", and "You Gotta Be My Baby".

Why Baby, Why

Jones and Edwards also collaborated on "Seasons Of My Heart", which would go on to be a hit for Johnny Cash and was also recorded by Jerry Lee Lewis and Willie Nelson. Former Starday president Don Pierce later explained to Jones biographer Bob Allen that "Pappy realized George's strength as a balladeer long before I did. He felt that 'Seasons Of My Heart' was a big song. I knew that, in those days, it took much longer to sell a ballad, because it had to make it on the radio first...I also knew that an upbeat song like 'Why, Baby Why' would be easier to sell directly to the jukebox distributors for the beer-drinkin' trade."

=== Sound quality ===
In later years, Jones would have little good to say about the music production at Starday, recalling to NPR in 1996 that "it was a terrible sound. We recorded in a small living room of a house on a highway near Beaumont. You could hear the trucks. We had to stop a lot of times because it wasn't soundproof, it was just egg crates nailed on the wall and the big old semi trucks would go by and make a lot of noise and we'd have to start over again."

== Track listing ==
All tracks are written by George Jones, with additional co-writers as noted.

Side One
No.	Title	Writer(s)	Length
1.	"Why Baby Why"	Darrell Edwards	2:16
2.	"Seasons of My Heart"	Edwards	2:51
3.	"It's OK"		2:18
4.	"Let Him Know"		2:35
5.	"Play It Cool"		2:33
6.	"Hold Everything"		1:51
7.	"Boat of Life"		2:00

Side Two
No.	Title	Writer(s)	Length
1.	"You Gotta Be My Baby"		2:33
2.	"What Am I Worth"	Edwards	2:34
3.	"Your Heart"	Edwards	2:40
4.	"Ragged But Right"		2:13
5.	"Yearning (duet w/ Jennette Hicks)"	Eddings	2:55
6.	"Still Hurtin'"		2:01
7.	"Taggin' Along"	Burl Stephens	2:57
