= Truck-driving country =

Subgenre of country and western music

- Stylistic origins: Country music; bakersfield sound; trucking culture
- Cultural origins: 1960s, United States
- Typical instruments: Vocals; acoustic guitar; drum; fiddle; bass guitar; mandolin; banjo; double bass; piano; organ; Dobro; electric guitar; steel guitar; pedal steel guitar; harmonica; tambourine

Other topics
- List of country musicians; list of years in country music

Truck-driving country or trucker country is a subgenre of country and western music. It is characterized by lyrical content about trucks (i.e. commercial vehicles, not pick-up trucks), truck drivers or truckers, and the trucking industry experience. This includes, for example, references to truck stops, CB radio, trucker jokes, attractive women, romance, heartbreak, loneliness, stimulants and eugeroics, teamsters, roads and highways, billboards, inclement weather, traffic, ICC, DOT, car accidents, washrooms, etc. In truck-driving country, references to "truck" include the following truck types: 10 wheeler, straight truck, 18 wheeler, tractor (bobtail), semi, tractor-trailer, semi tractor trailer, big rig, and some others. Truck-driving country musicians include Dave Dudley, Red Sovine, Terry Fell, Dick Curless, Red Simpson, Del Reeves, the Willis Brothers, Jerry Reed, Junior Brown, Commander Cody, C. W. McCall (1976 big hit "Convoy"), Mac Wiseman, and Cledus Maggard. Terry Fell released "Truck Drivin' Man" in 1954.

It shares some overlap with road music (e.g. Willie Nelson's "On the Road Again", Roger Miller's "King of the Road"), which may or may not involve commercial trucks but carries many of the same themes of the traveling worker. It is not to be confused with the frequent use of the personal-use pickup truck in bro-country, where the vehicle is mainly used as a pick-up device.

== Overview ==
It is, at least partly, an oral history of trucking. A range of social and economic factors in the United States have strongly influenced the evolution of truck-driving country as a subgenre of country music. These factors include industrial dispute, the demographic shift from rural to urban areas, economic recessions, changes in the railroads, and the oil embargo. Their impacts have diversified the folklore of truck songs.

Technological developments and changes related to both the music business and the trucking industry, however, have brought about the greatest changes to truck-driving country. Variously, these include the jukebox, 33⅓ rpm vinyl record albums, 8-track tape, cassette tape, the transistor to digital revolution, the Internet, CB radio, all-night radio broadcasts targeting truckers, Interstate highways, and multiple truck components (sleeper cabs, air suspension, power steering, synchronized transmissions, air conditioning, air seats, and electronics).

Collectively, there are more than 500 truck-driving country songs, all of which more or less originate from the oral tradition of truck folklore. Occupations, of course, have traditionally provided the raw material and inspiration for folk music in the United States (e.g. riverboat, mining, Great Lakes water commerce, logging, cowboy, railroad, agricultural field work and others), influenced by regional culture as well. Folk songs adopt, adapt, and incorporate colloquialisms, slang, and occupational terms into verbal snapshots. In truck-driving country, such specialized words and terms as truck rodeo, dog house, twin screw, Georgia overdrive, saddle tanks, jake brake, binder and others borrowed from the lingo of truckers are commonly utilized. CB vocabulary – which is different from truck driver lingo – is used by both truckers and the general public. Some of that vocabulary has evolved into popular culture and subsequently incorporated into truck-driving country (e.g. “hammer down," “shakey town," “smokey," and "pedal to the metal").

== Detail ==
There has been a certain mystique attached to truck drivers and commercial trucking in general, especially those engaged in long-distance (over-the-road) driving.

The evolution of technology continues to influence trucking music. Just as truck drivers in the 1970s and 1980s no longer had to rely on AM radio or pre-recorded 8-track tapes to listen to the music they wanted to hear, today the portable computer, Wi-Fi, and satellite radio allow independent singer-songwriters such as Dale Watson, Jim Goad, Sonny George, and Bill Kirchen to produce and distribute their own trucking music.

== See also ==
- Country Music Hall of Fame and Museum
- Country-western dance
- Culture of the Southern United States
- List of country music performers
