= Why Baby Why =

1955 single by George Jones

Single by George Jones

from the album Grand Ole Opry's New Star
- B-side: "Seasons of My Heart"
- Released: September 17, 1955
- Recorded: August 27, 1955
- Studio: Gold Star (Houston, Texas)
- Genre: Country, rockabilly
- Length: 2:47 (original 1955 version) 2:16 (Unbridged Version)
- Label: Starday; Starday 202
- Songwriters: Darrell Edwards; George Jones
- Producer: Pappy Daily

George Jones singles chronology
"Hold Everything" (1955)	"Why Baby Why" (1955)	"What Am I Worth" (1956)

"Why Baby Why"

Single by Charley Pride

from the album Charley Pride Live
- B-side: "It's So Good to Be Together"
- Released: 1982
- Genre: Country
- Length: 2:11
- Label: RCA
- Songwriters: Darrell Edwards; George Jones
- Producer: Norro Wilson

Charley Pride singles chronology
"You're So Good When You're Bad" (1982)	"Why Baby Why" (1982)	"More and More" (1983)

"Why Baby Why" is a country music song co-written and originally recorded by George Jones. Released in late 1955 on Starday Records and produced by Starday co-founder and Jones' manager Pappy Daily, it peaked at 4 on the Billboard country charts that year. It was Jones' first chart single, following several unsuccessful singles released during the prior year on Starday. "Why Baby Why", has gone on to become a country standard, having been covered by many artists.

== Recording and composition ==
Jones' recording session for "Why Baby Why" took place at Gold Star Studios in Houston, Texas and featured the house lineup of Glenn Barber on lead guitar, Herb Remington on pedal steel guitar, Tony Sepolio on fiddle, and Doc Lewis on piano. The arrangement is upbeat honky tonk, led by a fiddle that plays throughout the song. Overall, the song has been described as a classic of the "finger-pointin' cheatin' song". In the liner notes to the retrospective Cup Of Loneliness: The Classic Mercury Years, country music historian Colin Escott observes that part of the song's appeal "lay in the way a Cajun dance number was trying to break free of a honky tonk song." Jones recorded the backing vocal himself, with help from innovative techniques from engineer Bill Quinn, after a planned appearance by more established singer Sonny Burns did not materialize due to the latter's drinking. According to the book George Jones: The Life and Times of a Honky Tonk Legend, Jones's frequent songwriting partner Darrell Edwards was inspired to write the words after hearing an argument between a couple at a gas station. The lyric sets up the theme of the song:

Lord, I can't live without you and you know it's true
But there's no livin' with you so what'll I do
I'm goin' honky tonkin', get as tight as I can
And maybe by then you'll 'preciate a good man
Tell me why baby, why baby, why baby why
You make me cry baby, cry baby, cry baby cry

== Credits and personnel ==
For the 1955 Original recording.

- George Jones – vocals, acoustic guitar
- Herb Remington – steel guitar
- Lew Brisby – bass
- Tony Sepolio – fiddle
- Doc Lewis – piano

== Critical reception ==
The single's early airplay occurred in Jones' home state of Texas, with Houston's country music station KIKK ranking it number one locally. Their charts were sent to stations around the country, which began to pick it up as well, partially overcoming Starday's regionally limited distribution. However, its progress on the chart was blunted by Red Sovine and Webb Pierce's cover duet, which benefited from Decca Records' major label status and national distribution and rose to number one on the chart over the 1955–1956 Christmas holiday period. Jones's rendition was later included as the first track on his 1957 debut album Grand Ole Opry's New Star.

== Cover versions ==
Since the release of Jones' rendition, "Why Baby Why" has been covered by several other artists, many of whom have also charted with it. Jones himself re-recorded it a couple of times as a duet; first with Gene Pitney for their It's Country Time Again! album released in 1966, and with Ricky Skaggs for the 1994 album The Bradley Barn Sessions which featured re-recordings of Jones' songs as duets with various artists. Two different versions of the song have reached Number One on the country charts, making it one of the only country songs to hold that distinction. Artists who have had country chart hits with renditions of this song include the following:

- Red Sovine and Webb Pierce, #1 in 1956
- Hank Locklin, #9 later in 1956
- Warren Smith and Shirley Collie, #23 in 1961
- Charley Pride, #1 in 1983
- Roger McGuinn, recorded the song in 1976 for his 1977 album Thunderbyrd
- Waylon Jennings and Willie Nelson recorded the song for their 1983 album Take It to the Limit.
- The Good Brothers, #20 in 1991 in Canada
- Palomino Road, #46 in 1992
- Patty Loveless cut the song in 2008.
- Peter Grudzien "Early".
- Actors Michael Shannon and Jessica Chastain covered the song for the 2022 miniseries George & Tammy.
