= Red Sovine =

American country musician (1917–1980)

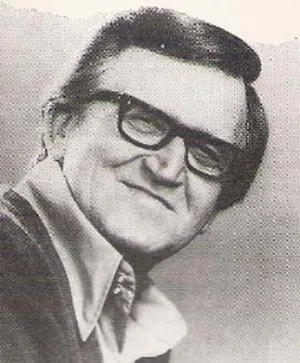

Background information
- Born: Woodrow Wilson Sovine; July 7, 1917; Charleston, West Virginia, U.S.
- Died: April 4, 1980 (aged 62) Nashville, Tennessee, U.S.
- Genres: Country, Truck-driving country
- Occupations: Musician, songwriter
- Instruments: Guitar, vocals
- Years active: 1935–1980
- Labels: Decca, Starday, Mirage

Woodrow Wilson "Red" Sovine (July 7, 1917 – April 4, 1980) was an American country music singer and songwriter associated with truck-driving country songs, particularly those recited as narratives but set to music. His most noted examples are "Giddyup Go" (1965) and "Teddy Bear" (1976), both of which topped the Billboard Hot Country Songs chart.

== Biography ==
Sovine was born in 1917 in Charleston, West Virginia, earning the nickname "Red" because of his reddish-brown hair. He had two brothers and two sisters. Sovine was taught to play guitar by his mother. His first venture into music was with his childhood friend Johnnie Bailes, with whom he performed as "Smiley and Red, the Singing Sailors" in the country music revue Jim Pike's Carolina Tar Heels on WWVA-AM in Wheeling, West Virginia. Faced with limited success, Bailes left to perform as part of the Bailes Brothers. Sovine got married, and continued to sing on Charleston radio, while holding down a job as a supervisor of a hosiery factory. With the encouragement of Bailes, Sovine formed the Echo Valley Boys.

== Career ==
After a year of performing in West Virginia, Sovine moved to Shreveport, Louisiana, where the Bailes Brothers were performing on KWKH-AM. Sovine's own early-morning show was not popular, but he gained greater exposure performing on the famed KWKH radio program, Louisiana Hayride. One of his co-stars was Hank Williams, who steered Sovine toward a better time slot at WSFA in Montgomery, Alabama, and toward a contract with MGM Records in 1949. That same year, Sovine replaced Williams on Louisiana Hayride when Williams jumped to performing on the Grand Ole Opry.

Another Louisiana Hayride co-star who helped Sovine was country music legend Webb Pierce, who convinced Sovine to lead his Wondering Boys band and helped him toward a contract with Decca in 1954. The following year, Sovine cut a duet with Goldie Hill, "Are You Mine?", which peaked in the Top 15, and in 1956, he had his first No. 1 hit when he duetted with Pierce on a cover of George Jones' "Why Baby Why". Sovine had two other Top 5 singles that year and became a member of the Grand Ole Opry. After recording close to 50 sides with Decca by 1959, Sovine signed to Starday Records and began touring the club circuit as a solo act. That same year, Sovine was seriously injured in a car accident that claimed the lives of two of his band members, Douglas Nicks and Johnny Morris.

=== 1960s ===
In 1961, a song copyrighted in 1955 by Sovine and co-writer Dale Noe became a sizeable hit on the pop chart. The tune was the ballad "Missing You", arranged in Countrypolitan style and was recorded by Ray Peterson for his own Dunes label. "Missing You" became a No. 29 Billboard Top 100 hit. In the fall, it peaked at No. 7 on Billboard's Adult Contemporary chart. In 1963, Sovine passed on the helping hand given him by older performers when he heard the singing of minor league baseball player Charley Pride, suggesting that he move to Nashville, Tennessee. Sovine opened doors for Pride at Pierce's Cedarwood Publishing, but his own career had stalled; "Dream House for Sale", which reached No. 22 in 1964, came nearly eight years after his last hit.

=== Truck-driving songs ===
In 1965, Sovine found his niche when he recorded "Giddyup Go", which, like most of his other trucker hits, he co-wrote with Tommy Hill. It is spoken, rather than sung, as the words of an older long-distance truck driver who rediscovers his long-lost son driving another truck on the same highway. Minnie Pearl released an answer song titled "Giddy-Up Go Answer". Sovine's version of the song spent six weeks atop the country charts. Other truck-driving country hits followed, including:

- "Phantom 309" is a tale of a hitchhiker who hops a ride from a trucker who turns out to be the ghost of a man who died years ago giving his life to save a school bus full of children from a horrible collision with his rig. This story was later adapted by singer-songwriter Tom Waits, who performed "Big Joe and Phantom 309" during his Nighthawks at the Diner recordings. Waits' version of this song was covered by Archers of Loaf on the 1995 tribute album, Step Right Up: The Songs of Tom Waits. Musician Steve Flett named a recording project after the song. The song was originally written and recorded by Tommy Faile.
- "Teddy Bear" is the tale of a disabled boy who lost his truck-driver father in a highway accident and keeps his CB radio base as his only companion. The song was eventually released in New Zealand on the Mirage label.
- "Little Joe" is a tale of a trucker and his devoted canine friend, which became his last hit. This last story features the Teddy Bear character, who can now walk.

== Personal life and death ==
Sovine was married to Norma Searls, who died on June 4, 1976, at the age of 57.

On April 4, 1980, Sovine suffered a heart attack while driving his van in southern Nashville, causing him to run a red light and strike an oncoming vehicle. The other driver, 25-year-old Edgar Primm, and he were transported to St. Thomas Hospital. While Primm was treated and released for minor facial injuries, Sovine died shortly after arrival. According to a preliminary autopsy, Sovine sustained massive abdominal bleeding caused by a lacerated spleen and liver, and fractured ribs and sternum.

== Discography ==
=== Studio albums ===
Year	Album	Chart positions			Label
Year	Album	US Country	AUS	CAN	Label
1956	Red Sovine	—	—	—	MGM
1961	The One and Only	—	—	—	Starday
1962	The Golden Country Ballads of the '60s	—	—	—	Starday
1963	Red Sovine	—	—	—	Decca
1965	The Heart Rending Little Rosa	—	—	—	Starday
1966	Country Music Time	—	—	—	Decca
1966	Giddy Up Go	4	—	—	Starday
1966	The Sensational Red	—	—	—	Starday
1966	The Nashville Sound	—	—	—	Starday
1967	I Didn't Jump the Fence	—	—	—	Starday
1967	Dear John Letter	—	—	—	Starday
1968	The Country Way	—	—	—	Vocalion
1968	Phantom 309	18	—	—	Starday
1968	Tell Maude I Slipped	—	—	—	Starday
1968	Sunday with Sovine	—	—	—	Starday
1968	Anytime	—	—	—	Starday
1969	Classic Narrations	—	—	—	Starday
1969	Closing Time Till Dawn	—	—	—	Starday
1969	Who Am I	—	—	—	Starday
1969	Ruby Don't Take Your Love to Town	—	—	—	Starday
1970	I Know You're Married	—	—	—	Starday
1973	Greatest Grand Ole Opry	—	—	—	Chart
1974	It'll Come Back	48	—	—	Chart
1975	Phantom 309 (reissue)	—	—	—	Gusto
1976	Teddy Bear	1	57	67	Starday
1977	Woodrow Wilson Sovine	50	—	—	Starday
1978	Christmas with Red Sovine	—	—	—	Starday
1978	16 New Gospel Songs	—	—	—	Gusto

=== Compilation albums ===
Year	Album	US Country	Label
1975	The Best	—	Starday
1975	Little Rosa	—	Hit
1977	16 All-Time Favorites	—	Starday
1977	16 Greatest Hits	47	Starday
1980	Teddy Bear	—	Gusto
1980	Phantom 309	—	Gusto
1980	Giddy Up Go	—	Gusto
1980	Gone But Not Forgotten	—	Castle
1986	Sings Hank Williams	—	Deluxe
1989	Crying in the Chapel	—	Hollywood
1989	Famous Duets	—	Hollywood
1991	Best of the Best	—	Federal
2001	Phantom 309	—	Prism Leisure
2002	Pledge of Allegiance	—	King
2002	20 All-Time Greatest Hits	—	King
2003	20 All Time Gospel Hits	—	King
2003	Teddy Bear	—	Gusto
2005	Greatest Hits	—	Varèse Sarabande
2011	Super Hits	—	Gusto
2014	40 Songs	—	IMG, Inc.

=== Singles ===
Year	Single	Chart positions			Label
Year	Single	US Country	US	AU	Label
1955	"Why Baby Why" (with Webb Pierce)	1	—	—	Decca
1955	"Are You Mine" (with Goldie Hill)	14	—	—	Decca
1956	"Little Rosa" (with Webb Pierce)	5	—	—	Decca
1956	"If Jesus Came to Your House"	15	—	—	Decca
1956	"Hold Everything (Till I Get Home)"	5	—	—	Decca
1959	"Yankee, Go Home" (with Goldie Hill)	17	—	—	Decca
1964	"Dream House for Sale"	22	—	—	Starday
1965	"Giddyup Go"	1	82	—	Starday
1966	"Long Night"	47	—	—	Starday
1966	"Class of 49"	44	—	—	Starday
1967	"I Didn't Jump the Fence"	17	—	—	Starday
1967	"In Your Heart"	33	—	—	Starday
1967	"Phantom 309"	9	—	—	Starday
1968	"Loser Making Good"	63	—	—	Starday
1968	"Normally, Norma Loves Me"	61	—	—	Starday
1968	"Tell Maude I Slipped"	33	—	—	Starday
1969	"Who am I"	62	—	—	Starday
1970	"Freightliner Fever"	54	—	—	Starday
1970	"I Know You're Married But I Love You Still"	52	—	—	Starday
1974	"It'll Come Back"	16	—	—	Chart
1974	"Can I Keep Him Daddy"	58	—	—	Chart
1975	"Daddy's Girl"	91	—	—	Chart
1975	"Phantom 309"	47	—	—	Starday
1976	"Teddy Bear"^{A}	1	40	12	Starday
1976	"Little Joe"	45	102	—	Starday
1976	"Last Goodbye"	96	—	—	Starday
1977	"Just Gettin' By"	98	—	—	Starday
1977	"Woman Behind the Man Behind the Wheel"	92	—	—	Starday
1978	"Lay Down Sally"	70	—	—	Starday
1978	"The Days of Me and You"	77	—	—	Starday
1980	"It'll Come Back"	89	—	—	Starday
1980	"The Little Family Soldier"	74	—	—	Starday

- ^{A}"Teddy Bear" also peaked at No. 1 on the RPM Country Tracks chart and No. 49 on the RPM Top Singles chart in Canada. It also hit No. 4 on the UK charts in 1981, the only song of his to chart in that country.
