= Starday Records =

Record label

- Founded: 1952
- Founder: Jack Starnes, Pappy Daily
- Defunct: 1968 (merger)
- Genre: Country
- Country of origin: United States
- Location: Beaumont, Texas

Starday Records was an American record label producing traditional country music during the 1950s and 1960s.

== History ==
The label began in 1952 in Beaumont, Texas, when local businessmen Jack Starnes (Lefty Frizzell's manager) and Houston record distributor Harold W. Daily (better known as "Pappy") decided to form a record label. The Starday name is a combination of Starnes' and Daily's last names. After four releases, former Four Star vice president Don Pierce was brought into the fold and the three men founded the Starday Recording and Publishing Company.

Soon after, Starnes sold his shares out to Pierce. In the mid-1950s, Art Talmadge of Mercury Records made Starday a unique proposition, whereby Mercury contracted out all production of Country and Bluegrass music to Starday Records. This move proved not to be the success Mercury had hoped it would be, and this resulted in an acrimonious split between Daily and Pierce. Daily joined Mercury records as an A&R man/Talent Scout, while Pierce took over Starday altogether and moved operations to Madison, Tennessee, a bedroom community of Nashville.

Pierce began to study in earnest the buying habits of the fans of Country & Western music. He soon found that most people who bought Country records were Adults who preferred the Long-Play album format over single records. With this knowledge Starday began cranking out LPs in earnest, with singles basically being an aside to their LP line.

In addition to creating the largest bluegrass catalogue throughout the 1950s and ‘60s, Starday was also known for its legendary rockabilly catalogue, an extensive Texas honky-tonk outpouring, classic gospel and sacred recordings and as a Nashville independent powerhouse studio and record label. Starday was the largest exclusively country label of the period and is renowned among record collectors for producing a level of pure, undiluted country music that was becoming increasingly rare on the major labels. Starday released the first recordings of George Jones and country stars like Willie Nelson, Dottie West, the Big Bopper, and Roger Miller. Comedian Minnie Pearl released a number of records for the label. Several veteran country stars were also on Starday, including Cowboy Copas, Helen Carter, Johnny Bond, Harry Choates, Link Davis and T. Texas Tyler. The label also featured several legendary country radio-based acts in the twilight of their careers, such as the Blue Sky Boys, Lulu Belle and Scotty, Texas Ruby, Mel Price, and Moon Mullican, performers probably not of much interest to the big labels in the 1960s. The label may be best known for the dozens of budget-priced compilation albums it released featuring artists on or at one time on the label.

Starday's most successful artist was perhaps Red Sovine, who scored a number of hits in the 1960s on the label. Starday also produced a series of classic anthologies of trucker records by various artists including Copas, Bond, Sovine, The Willis Brothers and bluegrass acts including Moore & Napier and Reno & Smiley. These LPs were renowned for their color covers shot at Nashville area truck stops with real rigs and shapely female models dressed as waitresses.

=== Starday-King Records ===
When Syd Nathan died in 1968, his label King Records was acquired by Hal Neely's Starday Company. Neely relaunched the label as Starday-King Records. The label was sold to LIN Broadcasting (sale consummated in 1970), which in turn sold it to Tennessee Recording and Publishing Company, owned by Freddy Bienstock, Hal Neely, Jerry Leiber, and Mike Stoller, who sold it in 1974 to Gusto Records.

By the end of the 1960s, Starday's new product was limited and most of its recordings were reissues, many of them originally recorded or released on other small labels. The Starday label briefly made a strong comeback in the mid-1970s when Gusto Records' Red Sovine took his recitation song record "Teddy Bear" to number one on the Billboard country chart in 1976 using the Starday label, and even made the back of the pop chart. This record rose to No. 1 in seven weeks, the fastest rise to the No. 1 position for any 45 rpm record released before or since.

University Press of Mississippi published The Starday Story: The House That Country Music Built, written by Nathan D. Gibson with Starday president Don Pierce, in January 2011. The book retraces the label's origins in 1953 through 1968 and the Starday-King merger.

== Starday hits ==
Record	Artist	Year	Billboard Country
"Why Baby Why"	George Jones	1955	4
"What Am I Worth"	George Jones	1956	7
"You Gotta Be My Baby"	George Jones	1956	7
"Just One More"	George Jones	1956	3
"Black Land Farmer"	Frankie Miller	1959	5
"Family Man"	Frankie Miller	1959	7
"Dear Mama"	Merle Kilgore	1960	12
"Alabam"	Cowboy Copas	1960	1
"Baby Rocked Her Dolly"	Frankie Miller	1960	15
"Love Has Made You Beautiful"	Merle Kilgore	1960	10
"Flat Top"	Cowboy Copas	1961	9
"Sunny Tennessee"	Cowboy Copas	1961	12
"Signed, Sealed, and Delivered"	Cowboy Copas	1961	10
"Ragged But Right"	Moon Mullican	1961	15
"10 Little Bottles"	Johnny Bond	1963	2
"Goodbye Kisses"	Cowboy Copas	1963	12
"Give Me 40 Acres"	The Willis Brothers	1964	4
"Giddyup Go"	Red Sovine	1966	1
"Giddyup Go Answer"	Minnie Pearl	1966	9
"Phantom 309"	Red Sovine	1967	9
"Bob"	The Willis Brothers	1967	9
"Teddy Bear"	Red Sovine	1976	1

== See also ==
- List of Starday Records artists
- Lists of record labels
