= The Best of Freddy Fender =

Greatest hits album by Freddy Fender
- Released: 1977
- Genre: Tejano
- Label: Dot
- Producer: Huey P. Meaux

Freddy Fender chronology
If You're Ever in Texas (1976)	The Best of Freddy Fender (1977)	If You Don't Love Me (1977)

Professional ratings
Review scores
Source	Rating
Christgau's Record Guide	A−
Tom Hull	B+

The Best of Freddy Fender is a greatest hits album by Freddy Fender that was released in 1977. The 1980 reissue MCA cassette tape version erroneously states the title on the end spine as "The Best of Freddy Fender Plus Seven".

== Track listing ==
1. "Before the Next Teardrop Falls" (Ben Peters, Vivian Keith)
2. "Wasted Days and Wasted Nights" (Baldemar Huerta, Wayne M. Duncan)
3. "Secret Love" (Paul Francis Webster, Sammy Fain)
4. "You'll Lose a Good Thing" (Huey P. Meaux)
5. "Vaya con Dios" (Buddy Pepper, Inez James, Larry Russell)
6. "Living It Down" (Ben Peters)
7. "Sugar Coated Love" (J.D. Miller)
8. "The Wild Side of Life" (Arlie Carter, William Warren)
9. "Since I Met You Baby" (Ivory Joe Hunter)
10. "The Rains Came" (Huey P. Meaux)
11. "I Love My Rancho Grande" (Baldemar Huerta)
12. "Mathilda" (George Khoury, Huey Thierry)
