= Rock 'n' Country =

Studio album by Freddy Fender
- Released: 1976
- Recorded: SugarHill (Houston, Texas)
- Genre: Country, tejano, rock and roll
- Label: Dot
- Producer: Huey P. Meaux

Freddy Fender chronology
Since I Met You Baby (1975)	Rock 'n' Country (1976)	Your Cheatin' Heart (1976)

Singles from Rock 'n' Country
- 1. "You'll Lose a Good Thing" Released: January 1976; 2. "Vaya con Dios" Released: May 1976; 3. "The Rains Came" Released: March 1977

Professional ratings
Review scores
Source	Rating
Christgau's Record Guide	B+

Rock 'n' Country is a country music album by Freddy Fender that was released in 1976.

== Track listing ==
1. "Vaya con Dios" (Buddy Pepper, Inez James, Larry Russell)
2. "You'll Lose a Good Thing" (Barbara Lynn Ozen, Huey P. Meaux)
3. "I Need You So" (Tommy McLain)
4. "Mathilda" (George Khoury, Huey Thierry)
5. "My Happiness" (Betty Peterson, Borney Bergantine)
6. "Just Out of Reach of My Two Open Arms" (Virgil F. Stewart)
7. "The Rains Came" (Huey P. Meaux)
8. "Take Her a Message! I'm Lonely" (Baldemar Huerta)
9. "Since I Met You Baby" (Ivory Joe Hunter)
10. "Big Boss Man" (Al Smith, Luther Dixon)
11. "I Can't Help It If I'm Still in Love With You" (Hank Williams)

== Charts ==
Chart (1976)	Peak position
Australian (Kent Music Report)	98

== Personnel ==
- Freddy Fender - guitar, vocals
- Bill Ham, Bobby Neal, Eddie Nation, Russell McNeely - guitar
- Evan Arredondo, Ira Wilkes, Jimmy Jones, Keith Grimwood - bass
- "Uncle" Mick Moody - steel guitar
- "Fiddlin'" Frenchie Bourke - fiddle
- Bruce Ewen, Leo O'Neil, Michael Red Young - piano
- Bob Taylor, Dahrell Norriss, Randy Reeves - drums
