= You Don't Have to Go =

You Don't Have to Go may refer to:

- You Don't Have To Go, live album by Barbara Lynn (Ichiban) 1993
- "You Don't Have to Go", song by Muddy Waters from Live at the Checkerboard Lounge, Chicago 1981
- "You Don't Have to Go", song by The War on Drugs from A Deeper Understanding
- "You Don't Have to Go", song by Freddy Fender from Your Cheatin' Heart
- "You Don't Have to Go", song by Pinetop Perkins from After Hours
- "You Don't Have to Go", song by The Misunderstood
- "You Don't Have to Go", song by Eddie Cusic sampled on "Down the Road" by C2C
- "You Don't Have to Go", first hit record of Jimmy Reed
