= Are You Ready for Freddy? =

Studio album by Freddy Fender
- Released: 1975
- Studio: SugarHill (Houston, Texas)
- Genre: Tejano, country
- Length: 33:15
- Label: Dot
- Producer: Huey P. Meaux

Freddy Fender chronology
Recorded Inside Louisiana State Prison (1975)	Are You Ready for Freddy? (1975)	Since I Met You Baby (1975)

Professional ratings
Review scores
Source	Rating
Allmusic	4/5 stars

Are You Ready for Freddy? is an album by Freddy Fender. It was released in 1975 on Dot Records and is a collaboration between the singer and producer Huey P. Meaux.

== Overview ==
Of the 12 songs on the record, two were written by Fender, "Cielito Lindo Is My Lady" and "You Came In The Winter Of My Life". Of the rest, "Lovin' Cajun Style" is a song written by the album's producer. The remainder of the songs on the album are covers, including the novelty song "(How Much Is) That Doggie In The Window?", originally made famous by Patti Page in 1953, the Ray Charles classic "What'd I Say", and the song "I'm Not Through Loving You Yet", which was co-written by legendary country singer Conway Twitty and a number 3 country hit for Twitty the year prior.

== Reception ==
allmusic's Eugene Chadbourne gave the disc high praise (4 stars of a possible 5), and said that Fender "can take on elements as disparate as Doris Day and Ray Charles and make a listener forget either of these icons even exist." He compared the playing on the record to "an incredibly hip, funky Tex-Mex band hired to play at a wedding."

== Track listing ==
1. "Secret Love" (Sammy Fain, Paul Francis Webster) 3:38
2. "Loving Cajun Style" (Huey P. Meaux) 2:21
3. "Take Your Time" (W.D. Parks) 2:12
4. "I Can't Put My Arms Around a Memory" (Naomi Martin) 2:32
5. "Cielito Lindo Is My Lady" (Fender) 3:10
6. "Begging to You" (Marty Robbins) 2:25
7. "What'd I Say" (Ray Charles) 3:04
8. "(How Much Is) That Doggie In The Window?" (Bobby Merrill) 3:05
9. "Teardrops in My Heart" (Vaughan Horton) 1:58
10. "You Came in the Winter of My Life" (Fender) 2:26
11. "I'm Not Through Loving You Yet" (Conway Twitty, L. E. White) 2:26
12. "Goodbye Clothes" (J. Riley) 3:36

== Charts ==
=== Weekly charts ===
Chart (1975–1976)	Peak position
Australian (Kent Music Report)|	97
US Billboard 200	41
US Top Country Albums (Billboard)	1

=== Year-end charts ===
Chart (1976)	Position
US Top Country Albums (Billboard)	10

== Personnel ==
- Freddy Fender: Electric & Acoustic Guitars, Lead Vocal
- Trace Balin: Backing Vocal
- Tommy Christian, Randy Cornor, Bill Ham, Robert Martinez, Bobby Neal: Electric & Acoustic Guitars
- Larry White: Steel
- Red Young: Piano
- Ira Wilkes: Bass
- Randall Lynch: Drums, Percussion
