= Tex-Mex (album) =

Studio album by Freddy Fender
- Released: 1979
- Studio: SugarHill (Houston, Texas)
- Genre: Tejano
- Label: ABC
- Producer: Huey P. Meaux

Freddy Fender chronology
Swamp Gold (1978)	Tex-Mex (1979)	The Texas Balladeer (1979)

Tex-Mex is a 1979 Tejano album by Freddy Fender.

== Track listing ==
1. "You're Turning Down the Flame of Love Too Low"
2. "Leaning"
3. "If That's All That's Worrying You"
4. "Just Because"
5. "I Really Don't Want to Know"
6. "Walking Piece of Heaven"
7. "She Came to the Valley"
8. "I'm a Fool to Care"
9. "She's Gone"
10. "Sweet Summer Day"
11. "Forgive"
12. "Cajun Stomp"
