= If You're Ever in Texas =

Studio album by Freddy Fender
- Released: October 1976
- Studio: SugarHill (Houston, Texas)
- Genre: Tejano
- Label: Dot
- Producer: Huey P. Meaux

Freddy Fender chronology
Your Cheatin' Heart (1976)	If You're Ever in Texas (1976)	The Best of Freddy Fender (1977)

Singles from If You're Ever in Texas
- 1. "Living It Down" Released: September 1976

If You're Ever in Texas is an album by Freddy Fender that was released in 1976.

== Track listing ==
1. "Don't Do It Darling"
2. "It's All in the Game"
3. "San Antonio Lady"
4. "What a Difference a Day Made"
5. "Living It Down"
6. "Pass Me By (If You're Only Passing Through)"
7. "If You're Ever in Texas"
8. "Sometimes"
9. "Just One Time"
10. "It's Too Late" (Chuck Willis)
11. 50's Medley: "Donna" / "For Sentimental Reasons" / "You're Mine" / "Cherry Pie" / "Sincerely" / "Earth Angel" / "Angel Baby" / "Daddy's Home"

== Personnel ==
- Freddie Fender - guitar, vocals
- Bill Ham - guitar
- Evan Arredondo, Ira Wilkes, Keith Grimwood - bass
- Larry White - steel guitar
- "Uncle" Micky Moody - steel guitar
- "Fiddlin'" Frenchie Bourke - fiddle
- Randy Lynch, Dahrell Norriss - drums
- Warren Ham - flute
- Bruce Ewen - keyboards
- The Sugar Sweets, Tracey Balin - background vocals
- Betty Rubin, Kim Brady, Margaret Ruttenberg, Mary Fulgham - strings
