= Since I Met You Baby =

Since I Met You Baby can refer to one of two things:

- Since I Met You Baby (album), a 1975 album released by Tex-Mex country music singer Freddy Fender
- "Since I Met You Baby" (song) a rhythm and blues song recorded by Ivory Joe Hunter and covered many times, most notably by Fender and Sonny James
