= Your Cheatin' Heart (disambiguation) =

"Your Cheatin' Heart" is a 1952 song by the American country music singer Hank Williams.

Your Cheatin' Heart may also refer to:

- Your Cheatin' Heart (Freddy Fender album), 1976
- Your Cheatin' Heart (Hank Williams, Jr. album), 1964
- Your Cheatin' Heart (film), a 1964 musical directed by Gene Nelson
- Your Cheatin' Heart (TV series), 1990 BBC TV series by John Byrne
- Episode one of the first series of Disney Channel sitcom Phil of the Future
