= Southern Backtones =

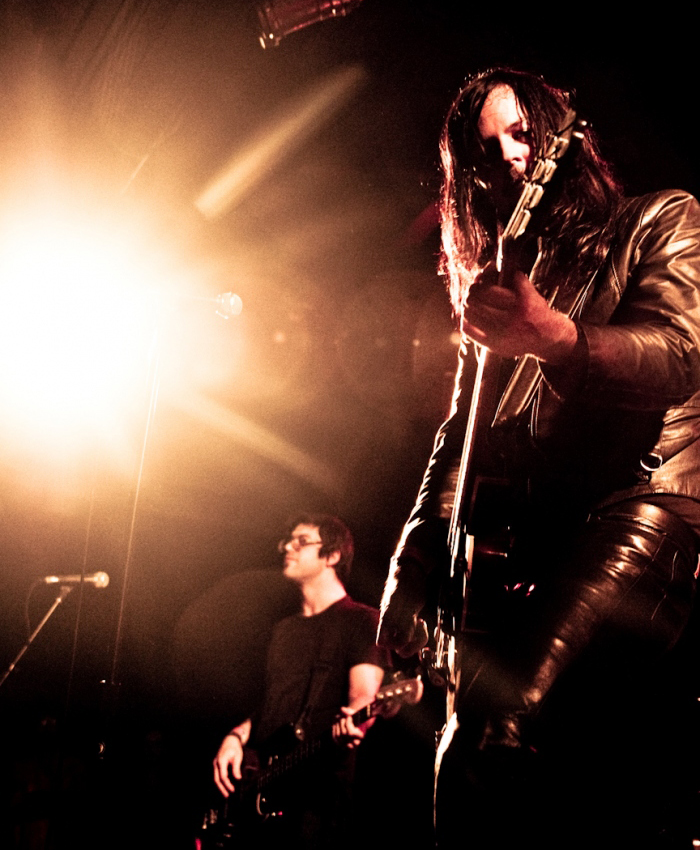
- Southern Backtones at Fitzgerald’s, Houston, TX

Background information
- Origin: Houston, Texas
- Genres: Rock and roll, glam rock, Spaghetti Western
- Years active: 1998–2014
- Label: Zenhill Records
- Members: Hank Schyma; Todd Sommer; John Griffin
- Website: http://southernbacktones.net (defunct)

Southern Backtones was an American Southwestern rock band from Houston, Texas composed of Hank Schyma, Todd Sommer, and John Griffin. It was formed by Hank Schyma in the late ’90s and is often described as, “Brit-influenced rock with roots planted firmly in Texas,” “moody voodoo rock that intertwines with Spaghetti Western and devil-may-care rock ‘n roll.” They released their first album in 1998, and in the following 15 years they've been on MTV2 and Much Music, collected local accolades, and played with bands like Lynyrd Skynyrd, Old 97's, and Hayes Carll.

== History ==
=== Formation and First Album ===
Not much is recorded of the Southern Backtones’ early history until their first album, Los Tormentos De Amor, in 1998. David Taylor, Kevin Charles Patterson and Mykel Foster are cited as essential earlier contributors. Los Tormentos de Amor was recorded at SugarHill Recording Studios on 2” tape.

Recording this album began a working relationship that would carry on throughout the band's career; Hank Schyma working with producer Dan Workman formed the central core that would determine the band's direction. Workman is credited not only as producer on the album, but with some vocals as well; he would later appear in some form or fashion on every consecutive album release to date. It was mastered by Rodney Meyers, who would also master the following record.

The liner notes reference an inside joke: “All bridges burned by Mykel Foster,” a reference to the band's early rockstar attitude and penchant for disruption. Their unruly behavior across a number of Texas and Louisiana venues allegedly led to instances where they regained entry to bars on the promise of “that guy’s not in the band anymore.” The offending member was apparently almost always in attendance at the time. The phase would continue until a conversation with Workman would later convince them that “that stuff only works when you’re famous.” The band would live to shake off their formerly rambunctious ways, but not before circulating word of an incident that happened while headlining a show in New Orleans.

Levi's approached the band about using the song "Fallen Angel", using it as a central point for their Levi's/Stage Stores promotional campaign. It resulted in the Southern Backtones touring through 80 towns across Texas in the first ever stretch Hummer, playing on top of it in retailer parking lots. Footage from these shows ended up as the basis for a Levi's commercial, effectively releasing 100,000 copies of the album into distribution along the way.

=== Second Album ===
The band's second album, The Formula, was completed and pressed in 2002 (Dan Workman again produced and appeared on it). It is now considered by the band to be an unsatisfying experience and never released, despite some positive reviews. Only three tracks from the session would be later be made available as "Unreleased Studio Tracks".

=== The Blue EP ===
When the band returned to SugarHill Recording Studios, they were joined for the first time by Grammy winning Engineer Steve Christensen (who in addition to Workman would be involved with each successive release). Robbie Parrish served as Drum Tech for the EP as well as the resulting full-length album. He worked with Todd Sommer, a new drummer that would remain throughout the band's life.

This would also mark their introduction to Dan Workman's Casio SK-1, a small sampling keyboard originally intended as a toy, but would later end up on every release to date. Stringed arrangements were also added to expand the new sound; Kevin Ryan (co-author of Recording the Beatles) composed the arrangements that would surface on these recordings, played by accomplished violinist Nikola Augsburger.

The process was facilitated by the contributions of John Griffin, a guitarist for the band who funded much of the record, urging them to “spare no expense.” This led to the album being mastered by Jeff Lipton at the noted Peerless Mastering in Boston, MA. Several tracks showed up on the 2004 surf documentary There Ain’t No Surf In Texas. They would also have several tracks used in soundtrack of the 2005 film Drop Dead Sexy, starring Crispin Glover and Jason Lee.

During this period longtime bassist Mykel Foster left the band to focus on growing family responsibilities, though the band had a track included on a Journey's compilation called “Get Out of the Garage.”

=== Southern Backtones ===
During the time leading up to the 2006 release of their self-titled full-length album, W Ross Wells began working with them as a sometimes creative developer, but primarily as director of the music video for “Forever” (released in 2007) and “Slumber Party” (released in 2009), and key strategist behind their online promotions. The results found “Forever” included in regular rotation on MTV2, the Canadian network Much Music, and was later tapped for use by the CNBC program American Made. It would go on to win a Gold ADDY for Zenfilm in 2007.

The increased attention from the Northeast and Midwest resulted in an extensive national touring schedule, as well as radio promotion focusing heavily on responsive areas. Josh Applebee joined the tour working with the band as their traveling sound technician. In that period, Southern Backtones had singles reaching #1 on some stations around Boston and Iowa (oddly enough), and #2 singles on some stations around the east and west coasts. This momentum, begun by inclusion on the aforementioned Journey's compilation, led to them again being tapped by Levi's for their Fader Fort SXSW showcase in 2010.

A period of varied activity began; the band began spending ample time playing with people like Johnny Falstaff, John Evans, and Craig Kinsey and The Sideshow Tramps. Schyma's tornado-chasing exploits received more coverage. 2011 marked the year in which Honky Tonk Blood premiered, Schyma's first full-length film effort made possible by nearly everyone mentioned in this article. The film reached local cult-status, featuring several iconic businesses and artists around the city. A new bass player joined, Chris Goodwin, and the band proceeded on to producing their next album.

=== La Vie en Noir ===
2012 saw the release of the album La Vie en Noir, regarded as a return to the roots of the initial record fifteen years earlier. It was once again recorded at SugarHill Recording Studios, with some additional tracking and mixing at Treehouse Studios. It was again produced by Dan Workman, now co-produced by Steve Christensen, this time mastered by Allen Corneau at Essential Sound Mastering. Some percussion was recorded by Josh Applebee at his own Chateau de Rosewood, it featured a remix of ‘Dirty’ (originally from the self-titled album) by Sugarhill's Chris Longwood. Schyma and drummer Todd Sommer co-wrote the stringed arrangements, played live by Jo Bird of stringed-quartet Two Star Symphony. It was released on February 11, 2012, with a performance featuring many of the guests stars on the album, followed by an anniversary screening of Honky Tonk Blood. The band split up in 2014.

== Influences ==
The band has been compared to Jim Morrison and The Doors, which the band concedes are early influences. There have also been comparisons to David Bowie, especially in regard to the latest album, but the band asserts it is due to heavy influence from Pulp instead. Early influences also included Elvis Presley, Dick Dale, Chris Isaac and The Cult (critics would add Buzzcocks, but the latest album bears more influence from more local artists like John Evans Band, Johnny Falstaff, Craig Kinsey, and the Sideshow Tramps.

== Other work ==
Hank Schyma spends a portion of each year archiving tornadoes and other inclement weather footage by a series of trips across Central America. Some of his work is visible online at his website and often airs on The Discovery Channel, The Weather Channel, BBC, CNN, FOX, CBS, ABC, and CBS.
