= La Música de Baldemar Huerta =

Studio album by Freddy Fender
- Released: February 12, 2002
- Genre: Country, bolero
- Label: Back Porch
- Producer: Michael Morales, Joe Reyes, Freddy Fender, Ron Morales

Freddy Fender chronology
Best of Freddy Fender Wasted Days and Wasted Nights (2001)	La Música de Baldemar Huerta (2002)	Secret Love: Live (2002)

Professional ratings
Review scores
Source	Rating
Allmusic	3/5 stars

La Música de Baldemar Huerta ("The Music of Baldemar Huerta") is the title of the Grammy Award recipient cover album released by performer Freddy Fender on February 12, 2002.

== Album history ==
On this album, Freddy Fender pays homage to the music of his youth, songs he heard growing up in the Río Grande valley. About the recording sessions, the singer told Billboard magazine: "Ten songs are what you call boleros, mainly from the '50s, and there are a couple from the '40s." La Música de Baldemar Huerta also features two songs in English language, "Secret Love" and "Before the Next Teardrop Falls", country music with mariachi guitars. "It's really nice. The rest of them are love songs. I have maybe one that's a fast song, but it's still about love.", the singer said.

Fender connected with producers Michael and Ron Morales because they had worked with the Texas Tornados, as well as Tornado member Flaco Jiménez. "I did the vocals with just the guitar," Fender told about the recording in his hometown of Corpus Christi, Texas. "Then in San Antonio they put harmonies on it, and both Ron and Michael put some more instruments on it. They even put strings and horns, and then the mariachi background. They did one hell of a job."

La Música de Baldemar Huerta was issued in limited release via Studio M Recordings before being picked up by Back Porch/Virgin. The regional release made it eligible to achieve the Grammy nomination for in the best Latin pop album category which it won. By the time of the Grammy Awards of 2001 ceremony, Fender was still recovering from a kidney transplant surgery. This trophy was the first Grammy Award that Fender won as a solo artist; previous to this the artist won two Best Mexican-American performance awards for group efforts with Texas Tornados and Los Super Seven.

For the artist, the Grammy was a long time coming. "I really feel great. I've been going to the Grammys off and on since the '70s and been wanting to win one since then," Fender told Billboard.com. "I was nominated in '75, but Captain & Tennille won record of the year for "Love Will Keep Us Together". And in '76, I was up again, but Stevie Wonder took it. I won the awards with the Tornados and Super Seven, but this is my first individual win, and that really makes me feel real nice and warm."

== Track listing ==
No.	Title	Writer(s)	Length
1.	"Rayito de Luna"	J.J. "Cucho" Navarro	3:11
2.	"Perfidia"	Alberto Domínguez	3:19
3.	"Cien Años"	Alberto Cervantes, Rubén Fuentes	3:02
4.	"Recuerdos de Ipacairi"	Zulema de Mirkin, Demetrio Ortíz	3:30
5.	"Cien Mujeres"	Alfredo Gil	3:13
6.	"Amor Pérdido"	Pedro Flores	3:33
7.	"Noche de Ronda"	Agustín Lara	2:57
8.	"Siete Notas de Amor"	Santiago Alvarado	3:18
9.	"Despedida"	Flores	3:33
10.	"Adiós Muchachos"	Cesar Sanders, Caesar Vedani	3:09
11.	"Before the Next Teardrop Falls"	Vivian Keith, Ben Peters	2:35
12.	"Secret Love"	Sammy Fain, Paul Francis Webster	3:34

== Personnel ==
The following people contributed to La Música de Baldemar Huerta:

- Michael Morales – percussion, vocals, producer, engineer, mixing
- Ron Morales – vocals, producer, engineer, mixing
- Joe Reyes – guitar, vocals, producer, engineer
- Jerre Hall – creative consultant
- Bill Hoover – executive producer
- Clayton Hoover – executive producer
- CJ – digital editing
- Mark Sadler – studio project manager
- Juan A. Aguilar – guitar
- Freddy Fender – vocals
- Bobby Flores – violin, orchestral arrangements
- Al Gomez – trumpet
- Francisco "Pancho" Perez – guitarrón
- John Schattenberg – violin
- Chepe Solis & San Antonio – guitar, requinto
- Gabriel Zavala – percussion, accordion
- Kurt Pfeifer – art direction
