= If You Don't Love Me =

Studio album by Freddy Fender
- Released: 1977
- Genre: Tejano
- Label: Dot
- Producer: Huey P. Meaux

Freddy Fender chronology
The Best of Freddy Fender (1977)	If You Don't Love Me (1977)	Merry Christmas / Feliz Navidad (1977)

Professional ratings
Review scores
Source	Rating
AllMusic	2/5 stars

If You Don't Love Me is a 1977 album by Freddy Fender. It peaked at No. 34 on Billboard's Top Country Albums chart.

== Track listing ==
1. "We'll Take Our Last Walk Tonight"
2. "Louisiana Woman"
3. "How Are Things with You"
4. "If You're Looking for a Fool"
5. "If That's the Way You Want It"
6. "If You Don't Love Me"
7. "Think About Me"
8. "I Don't Want to Be Lonely"
9. "Faking the Feeling"
10. "Love Rules the Heart"
11. "Your Loving Couldn't Take the Walking Out of My Shoes"
12. "I Don't Dream About You Anymore"
