= The Rains Came (song) =

Single by Sir Douglas Quintet
- B-side: "Bacon Fat"
- Released: December 1965
- Genre: Garage rock
- Length: 2:13
- Label: Tribe
- Songwriter: Huey P. Meaux
- Producer: Huey P. Meaux

Sir Douglas Quintet singles chronology
"In Time" (1965)	"The Rains Came" (1965)	"Quarter to Three" (1966)

"The Rains Came"

Single by Freddy Fender

from the album Rock 'n' Country
- B-side: "Sugar Coated Love"
- Released: 1977
- Studio: SugarHill (Houston, Texas)
- Genre: Country
- Length: 2:17
- Label: Dot
- Songwriter: Huey P. Meaux
- Producer: Huey P. Meaux

Freddy Fender singles chronology
"Living It Down" (1976)	"The Rains Came" (1977)	"If You Don't Love Me (Why Don't You Just Leave Me Alone)" (1977)

"The Rains Came" is a song written by Huey P. Meaux and originally recorded by Big Sambo and the House Wreckers in 1962, reaching #74 on the Billboard Hot 100 chart that year.

Sir Douglas Quintet covered the song as a single in late 1965. Their version reached #31 on the Billboard Hot 100 in January 1966.

Freddy Fender covered the song as the third single from his 1977 album Rock 'n' Country. His version was the most successful, peaking at #4 on the Billboard Hot Country Singles chart and reaching #1 on the RPM Country Tracks chart in Canada.

== Chart performance ==
=== Big Sambo ===
Chart (1966)	Peak position
US Billboard Hot 100	74

=== Sir Douglas Quintet ===
Chart (1966)	Peak position
US Billboard Hot 100	31
Canada Top Singles (RPM)	19

=== Freddy Fender ===
Chart (1977)	Peak position
US Hot Country Songs (Billboard)	4
Canada RPM Country Singles	1

=== Year-end charts ===
Chart (1977)	Position
US Hot Country Songs (Billboard)	39
