= Since I Met You Baby (album) =

Studio album by Freddy Fender
- Released: 1975
- Genre: Tejano

Freddy Fender chronology
Are You Ready for Freddy? (1975)	Since I Met You Baby (1975)	Rock 'n' Country (1976)

Since I Met You Baby is an album by Freddy Fender that was released in 1975.

== Track listing ==
1. Since I Met You Baby
2. A Man Can Cry
3. Louisiana Blues
4. Crazy Baby
5. I'm Gonna Leave
6. Little Mama
7. You're Something Else for Me
8. Too Late to Remedy
9. Find Somebody New
10. Go On Baby (I Can Go on Without You)
11. The Wild Side of Life
