= Hank Schyma =

American musical artist, and storm chaser

Pecos Hank
- Photo by Jay Dryden

Background information
- Born: April 1, 1982 (age 44); Houston, Texas, U.S.
- Origin: Houston, Texas
- Genres: Americana; gypsy jazz; roots rock
- Years active: 1998–present
- Labels: Zenhill; Splice
- Website: pecoshank.com

Hank Schyma, also known as Pecos Hank, is a musician, songwriter, author, filmmaker and professional storm chaser based in Houston, Texas. He has commonly joked that he has a direct genetic link to Pecos Bill, the mythical folklore cowboy. He has fronted the rock group Southern Backtones for over fifteen years. During the same period, he has directed, produced and starred in a full-length independent film, several music videos, and a catalogue of storm and nature documentation. He served as storm consultant on major motion pictures.

== Early life ==
Hank Schyma was born and raised in Houston, and spent most of his youth in the Pecos River Valley. Schyma stated that he is unsure exactly how storm chasing first began to appeal to him, though he admits an early fascination with the tornado scene from The Wizard of Oz.

== Career ==
=== Music career ===
Schyma relocated briefly to Huntington Beach, California in the early 1990s, aiming "to be a rock star", but instead he spent his time in California "just surfing and delivering pizza". By 1994, he had returned to Texas, capturing severe weather footage on his own and beginning the music for what would later become Southern Backtones. The songs "Forever" and "Everything" were featured in the 2005 feature film Drop Dead Sexy and the music video for "Forever" saw regular rotation on MTV.

Schyma eventually left the usual rock band format in favor of mostly acoustic performances, often as a duet with violinist Jo Bird of Two Star Symphony. The new format in turn informed his recording format, which culminated in the release of the solo album El Reno Blues in 2015. El Reno Blues was met with much praise among aficionados of southwestern American culture."Pecos Hank" continues to release music to the present day.

Schyma collaborated with the Canadian indie rock band Arcade Fire on the music video for "The Lightning I, II". He was included in the Special Thanks section.

=== Storm chasing career ===
Hank's footage includes original storytelling, narration, and music, shared with over 1.1 million YouTube subscribers. His clients include National Geographic, Disney, TWC, CNN, Discovery Channel, among others. Hank's footage has also been featured in the major motion pictures, The Last Witch Hunter, Supercell, as well as BBC's "Seven Worlds" and the Netflix original "TAU."

In 2002, Schyma joined KHOU-TV's news team working as a camera operator, which gave him the opportunity to work under their head meteorologist, Dr. Neil Frank. Schyma is regarded to have gained professional storm chaser status in 2007, when he was appointed as KRIV's exclusive in-house storm chaser.

In 2008, Hank launched the YouTube channel "Pecos Hank", which would go on to be described by the University of Michigan Online as "an educational and cinematic delivery of severe weather as well as frequent encounters with the wild animals and interesting people he meets while living on the road day to day in Tornado Alley." Most of the music accompanying the storm video productions is composed by Hank Schyma as well.

Schyma was present in El Reno, Oklahoma on May 31, 2013, to witness and capture the widest tornado ever recorded. He recounted witnessing an 18-wheeler grounded by the tornado on the outskirts of town, though he later found that its driver survived the ordeal in the truck cabin unharmed. The driver's brush with mortality and the location of the incident were later commemorated on the album El Reno Blues.

In 2014 Hank was part of the scientific field operations team that documented and calculated the fastest forward moving tornado ever, near Pilger, Nebraska. The team was led by meteorologist and National Geographic Explorer Dr. Anton Seimon.

Schyma continues to contribute lightning and storm coverage to a variety of national and international outlets. He also maintains a YouTube channel called "Pecos Hank" where he documents his storm chasing around Tornado Alley. As of June 23, 2022, the channel had over one million subscribers.

In 2014, Schyma served as Storm Consultant for the film The Last Witch Hunter. Most of the tornado and lightning footages of the 2023 film Supercell are by Schyma.

In 2022, YETI Films released "The Ballad of Pecos Hank" after a film crew followed him through Tornado Alley for two weeks.

On October 28, 2025, Hank released "Storm - Chasing Natures Wildest Weather" in hard cover, published by Penguin Random House. It has been described as "a 30-year compendium that looks to be the most complete documentation of severe weather phenomena ever assembled by a single photographer."

== Contributions to science ==
On May 25, 2019, Schyma is credited with the discovery of a new transient luminous event called a ghost. They are faint, green glows that appear after red sprites. The name "ghost" is an acronym for Green emissions from excited Oxygen in Sprite Tops. Schyma explains, the name ghost also maintains the theme of other transient luminous events such as sprites, trolls, elves and pixies.

Schyma has been working with University of Wisconsin atmospheric scientist Dr. Leigh Orf validating supercomputer simulations of destructive tornadoes. “Schyma’s high-quality videos of supercells and tornadoes enable Orf to directly compare his models with what Schyma has experienced in real life, helping the research group demonstrate the validity of the model.”

Schyma is also part of atmospheric scientist Dr. Anton Seimon's research team, employing photogrammetry to estimate tornadic wind speeds and putting together a 3-D visual representation of a storm.
