= Barbara Lynn =

American rhythm and blues and electric blues guitarist and singer

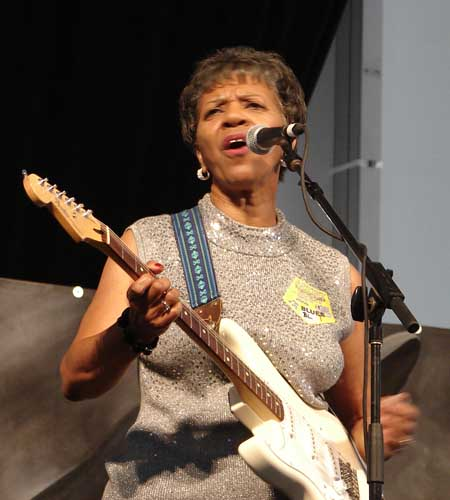
- Lynn on stage at the New Orleans Jazz & Heritage Festival, 2008

Background information
- Born: Barbara Lynn Ozen; January 16, 1942 (age 84); Beaumont, Texas, U.S.
- Genres: Rhythm and blues, electric blues
- Occupations: Musician, songwriter
- Instruments: Vocals, guitar
- Years active: 1962–present
- Labels: Jamie; Tribe; Atlantic; Jetstream; Ichiban; Bullseye Blues; I.T.P.; Antone's; Dialtone

Barbara Lynn (born Barbara Lynn Ozen, later Barbara Lynn Cumby, January 16, 1942) is an American rhythm and blues and electric blues guitarist, singer and songwriter. She is best known for her R&B chart-topping hit, "You'll Lose a Good Thing" (1962). In 2018, Lynn received a National Heritage Fellowship. In 2026 Lynn was further honored by being inducted into the Blues Hall of Fame.

== Life and career ==
She was born in Beaumont, Texas, and attended Hebert High School. She was raised Catholic and sang in the choir at her local parish. She also played piano as a child, but switched to guitar, which she plays left-handed. Inspired by blues artists Guitar Slim and Jimmy Reed, and pop acts Elvis Presley and Brenda Lee, and winning several local talent shows, she created an all-female band, Bobbie Lynn and Her Idols.

She began performing in local clubs in Texas. Singer Joe Barry saw her and introduced Lynn to producer Huey P. Meaux, who ran several record labels in New Orleans. Her first single, "You'll Lose a Good Thing", for which she was the songwriter, was recorded at Cosimo Matassa's J&M Recording Studio with session musicians including Mac Rebennack (Dr. John). Released by Jamie Records, it was a number 1 US Billboard R&B chart hit and Top 10 Billboard Hot 100 hit in 1962. The song was later recorded by Aretha Franklin and became a country hit record for Freddy Fender.

Lynn released an album, also titled You'll Lose A Good Thing, which featured ten of her compositions.

Unusual for the time, Lynn was a female African American singer who both wrote most of her own songs and played a lead instrument. Soon Lynn was touring with such soul musicians as Gladys Knight, Stevie Wonder, Smokey Robinson, Dionne Warwick, Jackie Wilson, Sam Cooke, Otis Redding, James Brown, Al Green, Carla Thomas, Marvin Gaye, Ike and Tina Turner, the Temptations, and B.B. King. She appeared at the Apollo Theater, twice on American Bandstand. In 1965, she had her song, "Oh Baby (We've Got A Good Thing Goin')" (1964) covered by the Rolling Stones on their album The Rolling Stones Now! in America and Out Of Our Heads in the UK. The song was also recorded by Bill Wyman's Rhythm Kings, with Beverly Skeete lead singing. Lynn continued to record for the Jamie label until 1966 and had several more minor hits.

In 1966 she signed to Meaux's Tribe label, and recorded "You Left the Water Running," which was originally recorded by Otis Redding (as a demo), covered by Wilson Pickett among others. She signed with Atlantic the following year, and recorded another album, Here Is Barbara Lynn, in 1968. She married for the first time, at age 28, in 1970 and had three children. This, together with dissatisfaction with poor promotion by the record company, contributed to her decision to largely retire from the music business for most of the 1970s and 1980s. However, while living in Los Angeles, she occasionally appeared at local clubs, and released several singles on Jetstream and other small labels.

In 1984 she toured Japan, and recorded a live album, You Don't Have to Go, which was released later in the US. She resumed her recording career after her husband's death, and returned to her hometown of Beaumont, Texas, where her mother lived. She also undertook further international tours, to Europe and elsewhere. In 1994, she recorded her first studio album in over twenty years, So Good, and released several more albums for various labels in later years.

She continues to reside in Beaumont, and was given a Pioneer Award by the Rhythm and Blues Foundation in 1999. In 2002, electronic musician Moby sampled Lynn's "I'm A Good Woman" on his album 18.

She appears in the 2015 music documentary film I Am the Blues.

She is a recipient of a 2018 National Heritage Fellowship awarded by the National Endowment for the Arts, which is the United States government's highest honor in the folk and traditional arts.

In 2026 Lynn was inducted into the Blues Hall of Fame.

== Discography ==
=== Chart singles ===
Year	Single	Chart Positions	
Year	Single	US Pop	US R&B
1962	"You'll Lose a Good Thing"	8	1
1962	"Second Fiddle Girl"	63	-
1962	"You're Gonna Need Me"	65	13
1963	"Don't Be Cruel"	93	-
1963	"To Love or Not to Love"	135	-
1963	"(I Cried at) Laura's Wedding"	68	-
1964	"Oh! Baby (We Got a Good Thing Goin')"	69	19
1964	"Don't Spread It Around"	93	35
1965	"It's Better to Have It"	95	26
1966	"I'm a Good Woman"	129	-
1966	"You Left the Water Running"	110	42
1968	"This Is the Thanks I Get"	65	39
1971	"(Until Then) I'll Suffer"	-	31

=== Albums ===
- 1963 You'll Lose a Good Thing (Jamie)
- 1964 Sister of Soul (Jamie)
- 1968 Here Is Barbara Lynn (Atlantic)
- 1988 You Don't Have to Go (Ichiban)
- 1993 So Good (Bullseye Blues)
- 1996 Until Then I'll Suffer (I.T.P.)
- 2000 Hot Night Tonight (Antone's)
- 2004 Blues & Soul Situation (Dialtone)
