= Benny Barnes (singer) =

American singer-songwriter

- Born: Benjamin Milam Barnes, Jr. January 1, 1934; Beaumont, Texas, U.S.
- Died: August 8, 1985 (aged 51)
- Genres: Country
- Occupation: Singer-songwriter
- Instruments: Vocals, guitar
- Years active: 1956–1977
- Labels: Starday, Mercury, Playboy

Benjamin Milam Barnes Jr. (January 1, 1934 – August 8, 1985) was an American country music singer, songwriter, and guitarist. He is best known for his 1956 hit "Poor Man's Riches".

== Biography ==
Barnes was born January 1, 1934, in Beaumont, Texas. He first played ukulele, and then guitar, in his childhood, and entered various talent shows in Beaumont, Texas in his teens. He then befriended George Jones, who also mentored him and had him play rhythm guitar in his road band. At a recording session with Jones at Gold Star Studios in Houston in 1955, Barnes was encouraged by Starday Records owner and record producer Pappy Daily to audition as an artist. His first Starday release, "Once Again", was issued in 1956. Following three more unsuccessful releases, he issued "Poor Man's Riches" in August 1956, which went to No. 2 on the Billboard country charts. Although later recordings were unsuccessful, Barnes appeared on the Louisiana Hayride and continued to record for various other labels throughout his career. His second chart entry came in 1961 on Mercury Records with "Yearning". At this point, Barnes also operated a tavern in Beaumont. Barnes continued to record until shortly before his death in 1985. Bear Family Records issued a compilation titled Benny Barnes: The Complete 1950s Recordings in 2007.

== Discography ==
Year	Single	Peak chart positions
Year	Single	US Country
1956	"Poor Man's Riches"	2
1961	"Yearning"	22
1977	"I've Got Some Getting Over You to Do"	94
