= Swamp Gold =

Studio album by Freddy Fender
- Released: 1978
- Genre: Tejano
- Label: ABC

Freddy Fender chronology
Merry Christmas / Feliz Navidad (1977)	Swamp Gold (1978)	Tex-Mex (1979)

Professional ratings
Review scores
Source	Rating
AllMusic	4/5 stars
Christgau's Record Guide	B−

Swamp Gold is an album by Freddy Fender, released in 1978 on ABC Records. It peaked at No. 44 on Billboards's Top Country Albums chart. Fender's version of "I'm Leaving It All Up to You" is a Tex-Mex standard.

== Track listing ==
1. "The Clock" (Freddie Fender (a.k.a. Baldemar Huerta))
2. "She's About a Mover" (Doug Sahm )
3. "When It Rains It Really Pours" (Billy "The Kid" Emerson)
4. "It's Raining" (Naomi Neville)
5. "I'm Leaving It All Up to You"
6. "Tell It Like It Is" (George Davis/Lee Diamond )
7. "My Tears Are Falling Tonight Love"
8. "Talk to Me" (Joe Seneca)
9. "These Arms of Mine" (Otis Redding)
10. "Breaking Up Is Hard (To Do)" (Neil Sedaka/Howard Greenfield)
11. "We've Got to Stop and Think It Over"
12. "Graduation Night (As You Pass Me By)"
13. "I'm Asking Forgiveness"
14. "Just a Moment of Your Time" (Freddie Fender (a.k.a. Baldemar Huerta))
15. "Please Mr. Sandman" (Pat Ballard)
