= Supercell (film) =

2023 film by Herbert James Winterstern

- Theatrical release poster
- Directed by: Herbert James Winterstern
- Screenplay by: Herbert James Winterstern; Anna Elizabeth James
- Story by: Herbert James Winterstern
- Produced by: Allen Cheney; Ryan Donnell Smith; Ryan Winterstern; Nathan Klingher
- Starring: Skeet Ulrich; Anne Heche; Daniel Diemer; Jordan Kristine Seamón; Alec Baldwin
- Cinematography: Andrew Jeric
- Edited by: R.J. Daniel Hanna
- Music by: Corey Wallace
- Production companies: Highland Film Group; Thomasville Pictures; Short Porch Pictures
- Distributed by: Saban Films
- Release date: March 17, 2023
- Country: United States
- Language: English
- Box office: $68,749

Supercell is a 2023 American disaster action film directed by Herbert James Winterstern from a screenplay that he wrote with Anna Elizabeth James. It stars Skeet Ulrich, Anne Heche, Daniel Diemer, Jordan Kristine Seamón, and Alec Baldwin.

It was released in theaters and video on demand on March 17, 2023.

== Plot ==
Bill and Quinn Brody are legendary storm chasers. When they have a child, William, Quinn decides to stay home and monitor the situations while Bill goes on the storm chases. During a storm chase, Quinn pleads with Bill to get out of the "bears cage" as the system is exploding. However he ignores her and he and two college students are killed by the tornado.

Several years later, Quinn is a house cleaner living in Florida assisted by the teenage William. William has been friends for years with Harper, who is teaching him how to drive. She also longs to be his girlfriend. William has interest in storm chasing which Quinn is trying to discourage. One day he goes to the roof of his high school during a thunderstorm with an instrument invented by his parents that is supposed to find tornadoes by a sound frequency, and is subsequently expelled. After receiving his parents chase log in the mail from his dad's former chase partner Roy Cameron who was like an uncle to William, William hitchhikes to Texas to the return address on the envelope. When he meets up with Roy, Roy at first wants to send him home, but acquiesces for him to tag along on a chase.

William finds out that Roy is an employee of Brody Storm Chase Tours, operated by the acerbic Zane Rogers who uses the legend of the Brody name to lure clients into purchasing tours. He grudgingly allows William along with the other "tourists" and is shown to be a risk-taker. When they are near a super cell, he tells Roy to pull off the road into a muddy field where they witness a tornado forming in the distance. However another part of the storm forms right over them and they take shelter in the van which is stuck in the mud as it is pelted with large hail. The damage to the van forces Roy to head to a garage a couple hours away to retrieve their back-up vehicle. Meanwhile Quinn has contacted Roy as she figures William is with him. She and Harper head west in Harper's car to track him down.

When Roy returns with the back-up van, he and Zane are forced to leave William behind at a gas station when a super cell forms nearby. However, a tornado forms right over the gas station and William rides it out in a phone booth. When the press shows up to interview William, Zane attempts to use the spotlight to promote his storm chasing tour, causing Roy to punch him and then quit. Roy and William head to a warehouse where William shows Roy the tornado frequency instrument, while Roy shows him his dad's original storm chasing vehicle. They then go witness what it looks like at night in the back of a super cell and its incredible lightning display.

The next morning as many chase crews congregate at a diner, Roy tells William that his mom is coming to get him and he is to stay there and wait for her. When Roy leaves the table, William sneaks out and joins with Zane and his latest storm tourists. They head to an area where a large super cell is forming, and when Quinn and Harper arrive at the diner they head after them with Roy. Zane stops the van on a hill and when William walks a distance away from the van, the tornado frequency instrument reveals a tornado bearing down on them. With the van stuck in the mud, William who barely knows how to drive, drives the van in reverse as Zane pushes it out of the mud and is subsequently sucked into the tornado. Continuing to drive in reverse, William narrowly escapes the tornado and just misses hitting the vehicle containing Roy, Quinn and Harper by turning the van's emergency lights on.

Running low on gas and with another large tornado heading towards them, Roy, Harper, Quinn, William and the storm tourists head for shelter in a nearby town. While others head for the underground shelter, William goes back to the van to retrieve his father's chase log. Quinn, Roy and Harper go after him and are cut off from the shelter by the approaching tornado. They dive into a swimming pool and survive underwater despite the van being tossed into the pool.

The next morning William and Harper confirm their romantic feelings for each other and Quinn tells William how proud his father would be as the van is fished out of the pool.

== Cast ==
- Skeet Ulrich as Roy
- Anne Heche as Quinn
- Daniel Diemer as William
  - Jack Eyman as Young William
- Jordan Kristine Seamón as Harper
- Alec Baldwin as Zane
- Anjul Nigam as Ramesh
- Michael Klingher as Chuck
- Jane Lind as May
- Richard Gunn as Bill
- Johnny Wactor as Martin
- Praya Lundberg as Amy

== Production ==
Principal photography occurred in Moultrie, Georgia in June 2021, as well as Lavina, Montana and Hardin, Montana in May 2021.

The film features a large amount of tornado footage from Houston-based storm chaser Pecos Hank.

== Release ==
Supercell was released simultaneously in theaters and video on-demand on March 17, 2023, by Saban Films.

=== Box office ===
As of June 27, 2024, Supercell grossed $68,749 in Hungary, Croatia, the United Arab Emirates, Portugal, and Slovakia.

=== Critical reception ===
On the review aggregator website Rotten Tomatoes, 44% of 16 critics' reviews are positive, with an average rating of 5.1/10.
