= Before the Next Teardrop Falls =

Studio album by Freddy Fender
- Released: 1974
- Studio: SugarHill (Houston, Texas)
- Genre: Country, Tejano
- Length: 30:11
- Label: ABC-Dot
- Producer: Huey P. Meaux

Freddy Fender chronology
Before the Next Teardrop Falls (1974)	Recorded Inside Louisiana State Prison (1975)

Professional ratings
Review scores
Source	Rating
AllMusic	4.5/5 stars
The Encyclopedia of Popular Music	3/5 stars
Tom Hull	B+
The Rolling Stone Album Guide	3.5/5 stars

Before The Next Teardrop Falls is the debut studio album by Tejano singer Freddy Fender.

Released in 1974, the album includes the number-one hits "Before the Next Teardrop Falls" and "Wasted Days and Wasted Nights". It peaked at No. 20 on the Billboard 200.

== Production ==
The album was produced by Huey P. Meaux, on the recommendation of Doug Sahm.

== Track listing ==
1. "Roses Are Red (My Love)" (Paul Evans, Al Byron) – 3:10
2. "I'm Not a Fool Anymore" (Robert Thibodeau) – 2:32
3. "Please Don't Tell Me How the Story Ends" (Kris Kristofferson) – 2:35
4. "You Can't Get Here from There" (Glenn Barber) – 2:56
5. "I Love My Rancho Grande" (Freddy Fender) – 2:51
6. "Wasted Days and Wasted Nights" (Wayne Duncan, Fender, Huey P. Meaux) – 2:52
7. "I Almost Called Your Name" (Margaret Lewis, Myra Smith) – 2:30
8. "Before the Next Teardrop Falls" (Vivian Keith, Ben Peters) – 2:30
9. "The Wild Side of Life" (Arlie Carter, William Warren) – 3:08
10. "After the Fire Is Gone" (L.E. White) – 2:56
11. "Then You Can Tell Me Goodbye" (John D. Loudermilk) – 2:15

== Charts ==
=== Weekly charts ===
Chart (1975)	Peak position
Australian Albums (Kent Music Report)	42
Dutch Albums (Album Top 100)	9
New Zealand Albums (RMNZ)	1
US Billboard 200	20
US Top Country Albums (Billboard)	1

=== Year-end charts ===
Chart (1975)	Position
New Zealand Albums (RMNZ)	12
US Billboard 200	41
US Top Country Albums (Billboard)	3
Chart (1976)	Position
New Zealand Albums (RMNZ)	24
US Top Country Albums (Billboard)	26

== Personnel ==
- Freddy Fender – vocals
- Randy Cornor – guitar
- Donny King – bass
- Chester Vaughn – drums
  - Special note:

"Before the Next Teardrop Falls" Bajo Sexto - Armando Lichtenberger Sr / Accordion - Silverio "Lefty" Cardenas
