= Trystan Layne =

American pop rock band

- Tomorrow Never Comes album cover.

Background information
- Origin: Austin, Texas
- Genres: Pop rock
- Years active: 2004–present
- Members: Edison Bradley; Adam Rogoyski; Joshua Applebee; Tyson Sheth
- Website: trystanlayne.com

Trystan Layne is an American pop rock band that formed in Austin, Texas in 2004 consisting of Edison Bradley (lead vocals/rhythm guitar/keyboard), Adam Franklyn Rogoyski (lead guitar/backing vocals), Joshua Applebee (bass guitar), and Tyson Sheth (drums). The group released their debut album Tomorrow Never Comes in 2008.

== Band history ==
=== Formation (2003–2007) ===
In 2003, at the age of 21, vocalist Edison Bradley was busy with schoolwork attending the University of Texas at Austin. While learning how to play the guitar in his free time, Bradley began his first attempts at songwriting. As music began to overpower all other interests in his life, close friend Mark Rogoyski introduced Edison to his brother Adam. With many common interests between them, Adam and Edison began collaborating on new music while playing shows around town and at the university as a duo. Despite auditioning numerous members for the band, Adam and Edison had a difficult time finding people they truly worked well with.

=== Tomorrow Never Comes (2007–present) ===
Without a proper drummer and bass player, Adam and Edison entered the recording process in late 2005 at SugarHill Studios armed with session players John Simmons and Eric Jarvis. Under the name Trystan Layne, they began work with tracking engineer Joshua Applebee and producer Dan Workman (Destiny's Child, Southern Backtones, Culturcide). Although they were initially aiming to record an extended play album for demo purposes, the team chemistry within the group was so good that the writing continued throughout the recording process, making way for a full album release. When news of a full album came to life, Austin artist and friend Adam Deats began working on the album artwork, which was to be inspired by the undertones presented in the music.

Midway through the process, tracking engineer Joshua Applebee (bass), along with his former Just Alleviate the Symptoms bandmate Tyson Sheth (drums), formally joined Adam and Edison to make up the current Trystan Layne. With the band complete, producer Dan Workman turned to SugarHill Studios engineer Steve Christensen to mix the project. With their online release, the band will begin to tour for this record in the summer of 2009.

== Discography ==
=== Studio albums ===
- 2008: Tomorrow Never Comes
