= Ben Peters =

American country music songwriter, singer, and musician (1933–2005)

- Born: Benjamin James Peters; June 20, 1933; Greenville, Mississippi, U.S.
- Died: May 25, 2005 (aged 71) Nashville, Tennessee, U.S.
- Occupation: Songwriter

Benjamin James Peters (June 20, 1933 – May 25, 2005) was an American country music songwriter who wrote many #1 songs. Charley Pride recorded 68 of his songs and 6 of them went to #1 on the American country charts. Peters was inducted into the Nashville Songwriters Hall of Fame in 1980.

Peters was briefly a recording artist himself; his only charting hit was his own composition "San Francisco is a Lonely Town", which hit #46 on the country charts in 1969.

== Number one compositions in America ==
- "Turn the World Around" (1967) was a #1 Billboard chart country hit for Eddy Arnold & top 5 Billboard chart AC single.
- "That's a No No" was a 1969 #1 Cashbox chart country hit for Lynn Anderson.
- "Kiss an Angel Good Mornin'" was a 1971 #1 Billboard chart country hit for Charley Pride; it also went to #21 on the American pop charts. It won Ben Peters the 1973 Grammy Award for Best Country Song.
- "It's Gonna Take a Little Bit Longer" was a 1972 #1 Billboard chart country hit for Charley Pride.
- "Before the Next Teardrop Falls" (w/Vivian Keith); first recorded in 1967 by Duane Dee in a version which reached #44 on the Billboard country singles chart early in 1968, the 1975 version by Freddy Fender was a #1 Billboard chart country and a #1 Billboard chart pop hit; it won a Country Music Association Award for Single of the Year in 1975.
- "Love Put a Song in My Heart" (1975) was a #1 Billboard chart country hit for Johnny Rodriguez.
- "A Whole Lotta Things to Sing About" was a #2 Billboard chart country hit for Charley Pride in 1976.
- "Daytime Friends" (1977) was a #1 Billboard chart country hit for Kenny Rogers. Westlife covered this song for a special BBC performance with Tony Brown as producer.
- "Burgers and Fries" was a 1978 #2 Billboard chart country hit for Charley Pride.
- "Before My Time" was a 1979 #1 Record World chart country hit for John Conlee and also a #1 hit on Canada's RPM'S country chart.
- "You're So Good When You're Bad" (1982) was a #1 Billboard chart country hit for Charley Pride.

== Other number one compositions ==
- "I Want To Wake Up With You" as recorded by reggae singer Boris Gardiner (1986–1987). This song was #1 in UK for 3 weeks. This song is one of the biggest hits in the history of reggae music.
- "Living It Down" went #1 in Canada's country music charts and it went to #2 as a Billboard chart country hit for Freddy Fender in 1976 in America.

== Notable compositions ==
- "If the Whole World Stopped Lovin'" was a #3 pop hit in the UK in November 1967 for the Irish singer Val Doonican. It made #2 in Ireland.
- "If the Whole World Stopped Lovin'" was a #12 American Billboard chart hit in 1966 pop hit for Roy Drusky.
- "Misty Memories" was a Grammy Nominated country chart hit for Brenda Lee in 1971.
- "I Need Somebody Bad" was a #11 Billboard country chart hit for Jack Greene in 1973.
- "Don't Give Up On Me" was a #3 American Billboard country chart hit for Jerry Wallace in 1973.
- "It's Time to Cross That Bridge" was a #13 Billboard chart country hit for Jack Greene in 1973.
- "I Can't Believe That It's All Over" was a #13 Billboard chart country hit for Skeeter Davis in 1973.
- "All Over Me" was a 1975 #4 Billboard chart country hit in America for Charlie Rich.
- "Lovin' On" was a #20 American Billboard chart country hit for T.G. Sheppard in 1977.
- "Before the Night Is Over" was recorded by Jerry Lee Lewis originally in 1977 and by Jerry Lee and B. B. King in 2006.
- "Puttin' In Overtime at Home" was a 1977 #8 Billboard chart country hit in America for Charlie Rich. It made #3 in Canada.
- "Lovin' On" was a #16 American Billboard chart country hit for Bellamy Brothers in 1978.
- "Tell Me What It's Like" (1979) was a #8 American Billboard chart Grammy Nominated country hit for Brenda Lee.
- "Lost My Baby Blues" was a 1982 top 5 Billboard chart country hit in America for David Frizzell. It made #5 in Canada.
- "I'm Only a Woman" recorded by Tammy Wynette.
- "San Francisco is a Lonely Town" was recorded and released in 1976 by Glen Campbell.

== Notable albums ==
- Peters had 3 songs, "The Little Town Square", "That's A No No" and "Satan Place" on the million-selling The Harper Valley P.T.A. album. This is a pop culture music album by Jeannie C. Riley released in 1968.
- Peters had 2 songs, "Mr. Mistletoe" and "Soon It Will Be Christmas Day" on The Christmas Album. This is a holiday music album by country music singer Lynn Anderson released in 1971.
- Peters had 1 song, "Daytime Friends" on the 4 million-selling 10 Years of Gold album. This is a collection of 10 years of Kenny Rogers hits.
- Peters had 1 song, "Daytime Friends" on the 4 million-selling Kenny Rogers 20 Greatest Hits album.
