= The Texas Balladeer =

Studio album by Freddy Fender
- Released: 1979
- Genre: Tejano
- Label: Starflite Records

Freddy Fender chronology
Tex-Mex (1979)	The Texas Balladeer (1979)

The Texas Balladeer is an album by Freddy Fender that was released in 1979. It contains his covers of two hits on the U.S. pop charts, "Squeeze Box" and "Share Your Love."

== Track listing ==
1. Yours
2. Squeeze Box
3. My Special Prayer
4. Walk Under a Snake
5. Trapped
6. Share Your Love
7. He's Got Nothing On Me but You
8. Gotta Travel On
9. Turn Around
10. Rock Down in My Shoe
