= Craig Kinsey =

American singer-songwriter (born 1971)

- Born: July 12, 1971 (age 55)
- Origin: Houston, Texas, U.S.
- Genres: Americana, Gypsy Jazz, Roots Rock
- Years active: 1998–2014
- Labels: Zenhill Records, Splice Records
- Website: craigkinsey101.com

Craig Kinsey (born July 12, 1971) is an American singer-songwriter based in Houston, Texas.

Kinsey developed an early interest in theology and belief systems in the American South. This interest led him to Canada before he returned to live in a monastic community near Eureka Springs, Arkansas. Following this period, Kinsey returned to Houston and studied at the University of Saint Thomas.

He graduated magna cum laude from the University of St. Thomas with a joint major in psychology and philosophy. He has since focused on a music career, releasing work on multiple Texas-based record labels. Kinsey has performed alongside artists such as Hayes Carll, opened for Ian McLagan of Faces and Roky Erickson, shared stages with John Evans and Robert Ellis, and performed just before Snoop Dogg at Houston's Free Press Summer Fest in 2012.

== History ==
=== Early life ===
Craig Kinsey was born on July 12, 1971, in Richmond, Texas, and raised in Houston. Due to early family influences, he fostered an interest in theology and culture of the 1920s and 1930s traveling hobos, including educated migrant workers and traveling revival tents of the era. This interest contributed to a youth spent in meditation, including periods of fasting and camping in the woods around southeast Texas until approximately age 19.

=== Monastic life ===
Upon returning to the South, Kinsey entered the Little Portion Hermitage, a Catholic monastic community near Eureka Springs, Arkansas, founded by singer/songwriter John Michael Talbot, where he took vows as a monk.

Kinsey remained with the monastery for nearly five years, learning about American southern music, including the beginnings of country rock as practiced by John Michael Talbot during his time with Mason Proffit. After a period, he was permitted to travel into Eureka Springs on weekends, where he met Melissa Carper of the Carper Family Band. His acquaintance with Carper and exposure to bluegrass performances contributed to his decision to return to civilian life and pursue musical and theological studies.

Kinsey eventually submitted an official request for release. After nearly five years in residence at the monastery, he was granted dispensation from the bishop and left for Houston to study at the University of Saint Thomas and start a band.

=== Education ===
Kinsey attended the University of Saint Thomas, graduating magna cum laude with a joint major in psychology and philosophy. He also participated in the theatre department. During this time, he met Geoffrey Muller and Scott McNeil, and they began playing informal sessions.

=== Musical work ===
Kinsey and his acquaintances began performing publicly, starting with a three-song appearance at an open-mic night at Helios, a bar in the Montrose neighborhood (now Avante Garden). The bartender arranged a weekly residency for the group following this performance. As the group continued to perform, drummer Shane Lauder joined them. They referred to their weekly nights of bluegrass and classic blues and country cover songs as The Medicine Show, later settling on Sideshow Tramps as the band's name. As original material emerged in their regular sets, recording plans began. In 2007, an album titled The Medicine Show was given a limited release in Houston, documenting the group's early work.

Kinsey preferred solitude and meditation before performances rather than socializing, and reportedly showed little interest in typical musician party lifestyles. His lifestyle and demeanor led to him being nicknamed 'The Reverend' within the local Americana/Gypsy jazz scene.

By the following year, Kinsey had written a number of songs that differed from the band's common feel. Given the informal nature of the Sideshow Tramps, developing new material was a slow process, leading Kinsey to decide a solo album would be a better fit. Fellow University of Saint Thomas alumnus Mike Whitebread funded a recording session in an apartment in the Montrose neighborhood of Houston, led by engineer Steve Christensen. Kinsey released the album The Burdener in 2008, which Houston Chronicle cited as among the best Houston releases of the year.

The album and the band's live performances attracted the attention of W Ross Wells of Zenfilm and Dan Workman of SugarHill Recording Studios. The pair had recently begun releasing albums for local acts under the label Zenhill Records. In 2009, Craig Kinsey signed with Zenhill Records to rerelease his solo album The Burdener, and work began on a new Sideshow Tramps album. In 2011, Revelator, the last studio album from Sideshow Tramps, was released on Zenhill Records. Several core members of the band subsequently pursued other musical engagements. Kinsey continued to develop his own music and performance style in combination with a large revolving cast of supporting musicians. Sideshow Tramps continue to perform regionally. A live album from an earlier performance exists, and at least one more album is reported to be in development.

While still working on 2011's Revelator, record producer Steve Christensen reportedly asked, "How long have you known you were going to be a musician?" Kinsey replied, "About two weeks." According to Kinsey, this conversation prompted him to recognize his focus had been primarily on spiritual and sociological pursuits rather than a music career.

=== American roots and machines ===
Kinsey spent the next three years writing and recording his next solo album, American Roots and Machines (AR&M). For this album, he recorded initial tracks on location in homes and rehearsal spaces, rather than solely in a studio. The resulting album was released on July 26, 2014, with a performance at Fitzgerald's in Houston, Texas, featuring guests including Alicia Gianni of the Houston Grand Opera, Dem Damn Dames, and Kam Franklin. Tour plans to support the album included a national tour focusing on locations near national parks, intended to reduce lodging expenses by camping.

== Influences ==
Friedrich Nietzsche, Woody Guthrie, Bill Monroe, Tom Waits, Blind Lemon Jefferson

== Other work ==
Kinsey has collaborated on various projects. He had a supporting role in the 2011 independent horror film Honky Tonk Blood, produced by Hank Schyma and Johnny Falstaff. Archived live footage of Sideshow Tramps performances appears in the film, and Kinsey makes multiple appearances on the soundtrack.

In 2011, Kinsey participated in an art opening at the Houston Art Car Museum titled 'Musicians Who Make Art', exhibiting several works of his visual art.

His album American Roots and Machines was the first release on Splice Records; he is a founding member of the label. Splice Records' stated plans include expanding and assisting local bands with releasing material and national touring.

Kinsey has been working on a novel that intertwines the story with themes from his album American Roots and Machines.. Progress on the novel reportedly slowed during the recording of AR&M, and no official release date has been announced.
