= Merry Christmas / Feliz Navidad =

Studio album by Freddy Fender
- Released: 1977
- Genre: Christmas
- Label: ABC

Freddy Fender chronology
If You Don't Love Me (1977)	Merry Christmas / Feliz Navidad (1977)	Swamp Gold (1978)

Professional ratings
Review scores
Source	Rating
Christgau's Record Guide	B

Merry Christmas / Feliz Navidad is a Christmas album by Freddy Fender that was released in 1977.

== Track listing ==
1. "Please Come Home for Christmas"
2. "Pretty Paper"
3. "Love Gets Better at Christmas"
4. "If Christmas Comes to Your House"
5. "Blue Christmas"
6. "Christmas in the Valley"
7. "Santa! Don't Pass Me By"
8. "When They Ring Those Christmas Bells"
9. "I'll Be on the Chimney"
10. "Natividad (The Infant Song)"
