= You'll Lose a Good Thing =

1962 single by Barbara Lynn

Single by Barbara Lynn

from the album You'll Lose a Good Thing
- B-side: "Lonely Heartache"
- Released: April 17, 1962
- Recorded: 1962
- Studio: J&M (New Orleans, Louisiana)
- Genre: Rhythm and blues
- Length: 2:53
- Label: Jamie
- Songwriter: Barbara Lynn Ozen
- Producer: Huey P. Meaux

"You'll Lose a Good Thing"

Single by Freddy Fender

from the album Rock 'N' Country
- B-side: "I'm to Blame"
- Released: January 1976
- Recorded: 1975
- Studio: SugarHill (Houston, Texas)
- Genre: Country
- Length: 2:53
- Label: ABC-Dot
- Songwriter: Barbara Lynn Ozen
- Producer: Huey P Meaux

Freddy Fender singles chronology
"Secret Love" (1975)	"You'll Lose a Good Thing" (1976)	"Vaya con Dios" (1976)

"You'll Lose a Good Thing" is a popular song written by rhythm and blues artist Barbara Lynn Ozen, who, performing as Barbara Lynn, scored a 1962 Top 10 hit, peaking at #8 and also the number 1 spot on the R&B charts, with her bluesy rendition of the song.

== Cover versions ==
- Freddy Fender retained those bluesy, soulful elements when he recorded a country version of the song in 1975. In April 1976, the song was his fourth No. 1 song on the Billboard magazine Hot Country Singles chart.

== Use in media ==
- Barbara Lynn's recording is featured in the film Hairspray.

== Charts ==
=== Barbara Lynn ===
Chart (1962)	Peak position
New Zealand (Lever Hit Parade)	8
U.S. Billboard R&B Singles	1
U.S. Billboard Hot 100	8

=== Freddy Fender ===
Chart (1976)	Peak position
New Zealand (RIANZ)	24
US Billboard Hot 100	32
US Hot Country Songs (Billboard)	1
US Adult Contemporary (Billboard)	28

=== Year-end charts ===
Chart (1976)	Position
US Hot Country Songs (Billboard)	22
