= Bubble Puppy =

American psychedelic rock band

- Also known as: Demian
- Origin: San Antonio, Texas, United States
- Genres: Psychedelic rock, acid rock, hard rock
- Years active: 1967–1972, 1974, 1977, 1978, 1984, 2011–present
- Members: Rod Prince; David Fore; Jimi Umstattd; Mark Miller; Gregg Stegall
- Past members: Roy Cox; Todd Potter; Danny Segovia; Clayton Pulley; Craig Root; Rob Hammond

Bubble Puppy is an American psychedelic rock band originally active from 1967 to 1972. They are best remembered for their Top 20 hit in 1969, "Hot Smoke & Sasafrass".

== History ==
=== Origins ===
Bubble Puppy was formed in 1966 in San Antonio, Texas, by Rod Prince and Roy Cox, who had previously performed together in the rock group called The Bad Seeds. Looking to form a "top gun rock band" based on the concept of dual lead guitars, Prince and Cox recruited Todd Potter, an Austin, Texas gymnast, saxophonist, and guitarist. With the addition of Danny Segovia and Clayton Pulley, the original lineup of Bubble Puppy was complete. The name "Bubble Puppy" was taken from "Centrifugal Bumble-puppy", a fictitious children's game in Aldous Huxley's 1932 novel Brave New World.

After some lineup changes (drummer Clayton Pulley being replaced by Craig Root, and the departure of Danny Segovia), the final roster for Bubble Puppy settled at Rod Prince and Todd Potter on lead guitars, Roy Cox on bass guitar, and David "Fuzzy" Fore on drums. In the spring of 1967, Bubble Puppy moved to Austin, Texas, and signed a recording contract with Houston-based International Artists. Bubble Puppy were one of the last groups to signed by the label before its demise in 1971.

The band appeared and toured with many notable artists from 1967 until 1971, including The Who, Grand Funk Railroad, Canned Heat, Steppenwolf, Jefferson Airplane, Bob Seger, Johnny Winter, and Janis Joplin.

=== Chart success ===
Bubble Puppy scored a hit in 1969 with the psychedelic single "Hot Smoke & Sasafrass", which became International Artists' biggest single, peaking at number 14 on the Billboard Hot 100 and number 15 on the Canadian RPM chart. In addition to its misspelling of "sassafras", the title was inspired by a line of dialogue heard in an episode of The Beverly Hillbillies. Attempting to capitalize on the song's unexpected success, Bubble Puppy released their debut album that year, titled A Gathering of Promises, but sales were poor and the group parted ways with International Artists in 1970.

=== Demian ===
Signing Nick St. Nicholas of Steppenwolf as a manager, Bubble Puppy moved to Los Angeles in 1970. Their name was changed to Demian, after Hermann Hesse's 1919 novel, at the suggestion of St. Nicholas' wife. This was to avoid contractual difficulties with their previous record company but also because the former name appeared to link them with bubblegum music. The group signed to ABC-Dunhill Records and released one self-titled album in 1971, but its failure to perform on the charts led to financial difficulties with the label and the group's break-up in 1972. Potter stayed in California, working as a session player, before joining and touring with Rusty Wier's Fabulous Filler Brothers.

=== Later years ===
The members of Bubble Puppy continued to be active in the music industry after the band's demise. Potter and Prince played with Sirius during the 1970s, and Fore drummed with the Texas punk rock band D-Day (fronted by De Lewellen).

In 1984, the original Bubble Puppy line-up reunited for performances and recordings, and they released their second LP, Wheels Go Round, in 1987.

Roy Cox founded The Blues Knights and released two CDs: Before I Go in 1999, and Road To Freedom in 2001. He formed the NYC Outlaws in September 2007 in New York City, along with Tony Saracene on guitar, Dan Curley on guitar, Cody Willard on guitar, Evan Hammer on bass, and Billy Brooks on drums. Cox died on April 2, 2013.

=== Reunion and 2011–2018 appearances ===
In 2011, three of the original members of Bubble Puppy reunited for a performance at Austin Chronicle's Music Awards. The band also added Mark Miller (guitar) and Jimmy Umstattd (bass) to the line-up. David Fore met the two while playing in Austin cover band the Kopy Kats. Fore and Miller also played together in the mid-1970s in another Austin cover band, Zeus. In April 2013, Gregg Stegall joined the line-up, taking Todd Potter's place in the band. Stegall has a long-standing musical affiliation with Miller and Umstattd, dating from the early 1970s. David Fore is currently taking a leave of absence, with Randall Maxwell on drums since mid-2018.

== Band members ==
=== Original members ===
- Rod Prince ‒ lead guitar, vocals
- Roy Cox ‒ (died 2 April 2013) bass guitar, vocals
- Todd Potter ‒ lead guitar, vocals
- David Fore ‒ drums, vocals

=== Current members ===
- Rod Prince ‒ guitar, lead vocals
- Mark Miller - guitar, vocals
- Jimi Umstattd ‒ bass, vocals
- Gregg Stegall ‒ guitar, vocals
- Randall Maxwell - drums, groove

== Discography ==
=== Singles ===
Year	Single	Chart Positions		
Year	Single	US	CA	AU
1969	"Hot Smoke & Sasafrass"	14	15	39
1969	"If I Had A Reason"	128	-	-
1969	"Beginning"	-	-	-
1969	"Days of Our Time"	-	-	-
1969	"What Do You See"	-	-	-
1971	"Face the Crowd" (as Demian)	-	-	-

=== Studio albums ===
Year	Album	Peak positions	Label
Year	Album	US 200	Label
1969	A Gathering of Promises	176	International Artists
1971	Demian	—	ABC-Dunhill

=== Live albums ===
- 1987: Bubble Puppy ‒ Wheels Go Round (One Big Guitar)

=== Compilation albums ===
- 2000: Bubble Puppy ‒ Hot Smoke (Actual Artists)
