= Before the Next Teardrop Falls (song) =

Single by Freddy Fender

from the album Before the Next Teardrop Falls
- B-side: "Waiting for Your Love"
- Released: 1974
- Recorded: 1974
- Genre: Country; Tejano
- Length: 2:33
- Label: Crazy Cajun 2002; ABC-Dot 17540
- Songwriters: Vivian Keith; Ben Peters
- Producer: Huey P. Meaux

Freddy Fender singles chronology
"Before the Next Teardrop Falls" (1974)	"Wasted Days and Wasted Nights" (1975)

"Before the Next Teardrop Falls" is an American country song written by Vivian Keith and Ben Peters, and most famously recorded by Freddy Fender. His version was a major crossover success in 1975, reaching number 1 on the Billboard pop and country charts. In 2025, the single was selected by the Library of Congress for preservation in the National Recording Registry.

== Song history ==
The song was written in 1967 and had been recorded more than two dozen times. It had achieved modest success in versions by various performers; the original by Duane Dee reached number 44 on the Billboard country chart in early 1968, and Linda Martell sent her version to number 33 in early 1970. Jerry Lee Lewis included it on his 1969 album, Another Place Another Time.

In 1974, record producer Huey P. Meaux approached Fender about overdubbing vocals for an instrumental track. Fender agreed, performing the song bilingual style—singing the first half of the song in English, then repeating it in Spanish. "The recording only took a few minutes", Fender told an interviewer, "I was glad to get it over with and I thought that would be the last of it".

The single was first released on Meaux's Crazy Cajun label in 1974, but was soon picked up for wider distribution by ABC-Dot. "Before the Next Teardrop Falls" immediately took off in popularity when released to country radio in January 1975. The song ascended to number 1 on the Billboard Hot Country Singles chart in March, spending two weeks atop the chart. Thereafter, the song caught on just as strongly at top 40 radio stations and it was not long before Fender had a number 1 Billboard Hot 100 hit as well. Billboard ranked it as the number four song of 1975.

As originally composed, it is in 32-bar form (Fender's bilingual recording stretches the piece to 48 bars).

A showcase of Fender's tenor and Meaux's Tex-Mex musical styling, "Before the Next Teardrop Falls" jump-started his career. (Fender's career had stalled in 1960 after his arrest on drug charges.) In the months and years that followed, Fender recorded several bilingual standards which became major hits, most notably "Secret Love".

Fender also recorded a version fully in Spanish, entitled "Estaré contigo cuando triste estés" (literally "I will be with you when you are sad"). The Spanish-language second verse in the English version is the first verse of the fully Spanish version.

== Successes ==
"Before the Next Teardrop Falls" was certified gold for sales of one million units by the Recording Industry Association of America. It also won the Single of the Year award from the Country Music Association in 1975, and was conducive to Fender also winning that year's Album of the Year and Male Vocalist of the Year awards.

The song was used in the movies Something Wild (1986) and The Three Burials of Melquiades Estrada (2005).

=== 1975 country-pop "half-dozen" ===
"Before the Next Teardrop Falls" was one of six songs released in 1975 that topped both the Billboard Hot 100 and Billboard Hot Country Singles charts. The others were "(Hey Won't You Play) Another Somebody Done Somebody Wrong Song" by B. J. Thomas; "Rhinestone Cowboy" by Glen Campbell; "Thank God I'm a Country Boy" and the two-sided hit "I'm Sorry"/"Calypso" by John Denver; and "Convoy" by C. W. McCall.

== Covers ==
- Charley Pride included the song in his 1968 album Make Mine Country.
- Gene Stuart went to number 3 with it in the IRMA Irish charts in 1969.
- Loretta Lynn recorded it for her album Home in 1975.
- Mexican singer Angelica Maria covered the song in an album of the same name in 1975.
- Lee Dorsey, on the album Am I That Easy to Forget?, a posthumous release in 1987.
- Cantonese version of the song, called 流下眼淚前, performed by Hong Kong singer Paula Tsui in 1987.
- Dolly Parton included it on her 1996 covers album Treasures; Parton's version featured vocals by David Hidalgo, who sang the Spanish lyrics.
- Clay Walker also recorded his version but along with Freddy Fender on his album Fall in 2007.
- Regional Mexican singer Jenni Rivera recorded two versions (English and Spanish) for her eleventh studio album La Gran Señora, released on December 1, 2009.
- Al Green recorded the song in 2018 for the Amazon Music "Produced By" series.
- The Mavericks included it on their 2019 Play the Hits release of favorite covers.
- Liza Colón-Zayas's character Tina Marrero sang the song at a karaoke bar in an episode of The Bear season two.
- Me First and the Gimme Gimmes on the album ¡Blow it...at Madison's Quinceañera! in 2024.

== Charts ==
=== Weekly charts ===
Chart (1975)	Peak position
Australia (Kent Music Report)	1
Canadian RPM Adult Contemporary Tracks	18
Canadian RPM Top Singles	6
Canadian RPM Country Tracks	1
Netherlands (Dutch Top 40)	6
New Zealand Singles Chart (RIANZ)	2
US Billboard Hot Adult Contemporary Singles	19
US Billboard Hot Country Singles	1
US Billboard Hot 100	1

=== Year-end charts ===
Chart (1975)	Rank
Australia (Kent Music Report)	9
Canada (RPM)	77
US Billboard Hot 100	4
