= Wasted Days and Wasted Nights =

Single by Freddy Fender

from the album Before the Next Teardrop Falls
- B-side: "I Love My Rancho Grande"
- Released: June 1975
- Recorded: 1959 (original); 1975 (hit version)
- Genre: Country; swamp pop; rockabilly
- Length: 2:52
- Label: ABC-Dot Records 17558
- Songwriters: Wayne Duncan, Freddy Fender
- Producer: Huey Meaux

Freddy Fender singles chronology
"Before the Next Teardrop Falls" (1975)	"Wasted Days and Wasted Nights" (1975)	"Since I Met You Baby" (1975)

"Wasted Days and Wasted Nights" is an American country and pop song recorded by Freddy Fender. It is considered by many to belong to the swamp pop idiom of south Louisiana and southeast Texas that had such a major musical impact on Fender.

== Song history ==
Fender wrote and recorded "Wasted Days and Wasted Nights", a blues ballad, for Duncan Records in 1959, early in his career. He was in the process of creating a mesh of rockabilly and Tejano, and the song showcased his new style. But he was arrested on charges of possession of marijuana, and in May 1960, he was convicted.

Fender also recorded a Spanish-language version, entitled "Noches y días perdidos".

In August 1971, the Texas-based band, Sir Douglas Quintet, released "Wasted Days and Wasted Nights," this group being best known for their 1965 hit, "She's About a Mover." The quintet's Doug Sahm dedicates the song to Fender before beginning; Fender later thanks his friend, Sahm, prior to the introduction of his re-recorded version of his hit in a similar fashion.

Then, in 1975, "Before the Next Teardrop Falls" became a major hit for Fender, and his career was rejuvenated. With the help of record producer Huey P. Meaux, Fender re-recorded "Wasted Days and Wasted Nights." The basic track for this song was engineered by Mickey Moody at Ben Jack's Recording Studio in Ft. Smith, Arkansas. Session players included Bruce Ewen on piano, Bill Hamm on guitar, David Hungate on bass, and Bob Ketchum on drums. This time, the song became a major pop and country hit, topping the Billboard Hot Country Singles chart in August 1975. On other charts, "Wasted Days and Wasted Nights" went to number eight on the Billboard Hot 100, and number nine on Billboard's Easy Listening chart.

"Wasted Days and Wasted Nights" was certified gold for sales of one million units by the Recording Industry Association of America.

The song was a major hit in New Zealand. In 1975, it spent a total of 12 weeks in the number one position in the New Zealand singles charts, making it the longest running number-one single at the time and the third-longest running number-one single of all time.

Fender later re-recorded the song in the 1980s; this version has added synthesizers and a gated snare drum.

He would record it again as a member of the Texas Tornados in the early 1990s. This version would also appear on the soundtrack to the 1993 film version of "The Beverly Hillbillies."

The song is heard in the background of a party scene depicting George W. Bush's drinking years in Oliver Stone's biographical film W. The song is also heard in the background of a scene from the alien abduction film Fire in the Sky, which was reportedly based on a true story.

It is also heard in Hancock. It also is heard in the 2021 TV series Reservation Dogs.

In 2012, the song was inducted into the Grammy Hall of Fame.

== Chart performance ==
=== Weekly charts ===
Chart (1975)	Peak position
Australia (Kent Music Report)	9
Canadian RPM Top Singles	6
Canadian RPM Country Tracks	2
Canadian RPM Adult Contemporary	14
New Zealand (Recorded Music NZ)	1
U.S. Billboard Hot 100	8
U.S. Billboard Hot Country Singles	1
U.S. Billboard Easy Listening	9
U.S. Cash Box Top 100	6

=== Year-end charts ===
Chart (1975)	Rank
Australia (Kent Music Report)	62
Canada RPM Top Singles	73
New Zealand	2
U.S. Billboard Hot 100	27
U.S. Cash Box	16

== Cover versions ==
Charley Crockett - on his 2016 album, In The Night. French singer Mireille Mathieu recorded in 1975 a French cover called "Inutile de nous revoir".

LeAnn Rimes - on her 2011 covers album Lady & Gentlemen. Jenni Rivera covered the song on her 2001 album Déjate Amar.

== Certifications ==
Region	Certification	Certified units/sales
Canada (Music Canada)	Gold	75,000^{^}
United States (RIAA)	Gold	1,000,000^{^}
^{^} Shipments figures based on certification alone.
