= The Bad Seeds (American band) =

American garage rock band (1964–1966)

- Origin: Corpus Christi, Texas, United States
- Genres: Garage rock; proto-punk
- Years active: 1964–1966
- Labels: J-Beck, Sundazed, Eva, Collectables
- Past members: Mike Taylor; Rod Prince; Henry Edgington; Bobby Donaho

The Bad Seeds were an American garage rock band formed in Corpus Christi, Texas, in 1964. Musically influenced by traditional blues and the raw recordings by the Rolling Stones, the group's sound was marked by primal proto-punk instrumental arrangements and vocals. The band released three singles, mostly originals penned by guitarist Mike Taylor, that have since become classics of garage rock, and have the Bad Seeds considered forerunners in popularizing the subgenre in Texas.

== History ==
The Bad Seeds formed when Mike Taylor (lead guitar, vocals) and Henry Edgington (bass guitar), both formerly members of the teen rock group the Four Winds, teamed up with Rod Prince (rhythm guitar, vocals) and Bobby Donaho (drums), who, beforehand, were playing in the rival act, the Titans, until its disbandment. The group, spearheaded by original material penned by Taylor and Prince, quickly established a loyal following regionally, becoming a frequent top competitor in battle of the bands contests, and appearing on the popular television program Teen Time. As music historian Bruce Eder asserts on the Allmusic website, the Bad Seeds were the "first rock group of note to come out of Corpus Christi, Texas, itself a hotbed of garage-rock activity during the middle/late 1960s".

In 1965, record producer Carl Becker discovered the group performing at a venue called the Surf Club, and signed them to a recording contract for J-Beck Records. With Becker producing, the Bad Seeds recorded their debut single, the Taylor-penned proto-punk classic, "A Taste of the Same", which was marked by Taylor's sardonic vocals and Prince's innovative guitar arrangements. The group followed-up their regional hit with the novelty surf rock tune "Zilch" (part one and two) in early 1966. Although the single was not received as well as "A Taste of the Same", the band still was able to perform it on Dick Clark's American Bandstand in early 1966. For their final single, the Bad Seeds entered Houston's Gold Star Studios to record "All Night Long". Also present was Louisiana-born musician Tony Joe White, who the group provided instrumentals for on four songs.

To celebrate their success, the group jump-started a tour highlighted by a battle of the bands at Corpus Christi's Carousel Lounge. However, to the crowd's surprise, the Bad Seeds only managed to reach second place after being ousted by up and coming band the Zakary Thaks. Though the Bad Seeds continued to perform, the defeat was seen as a symbolic passing of the torch for top musical act in the region. After the group disbanded in late 1966, Taylor produced and managed for the Zakary Thaks, and recorded under the moniker the Fabulous Michael. Prince went on to help form the psychedelic rock band Bubble Puppy. The Bads Seeds' material has become well-circulated on compilation albums, most prominently A Battle of the Bands and Revolution! Teen Time in Corpus Christi which both contain all of their released material.

The Bad Seeds should not be mistaken for another Texan group of the same name formed in Kilgore College, in 1966.

== Band members ==
- Mike Taylor – vocals, guitar – Died - March 10, 2023
- Henry Edgington – bass guitar - Died - October 6, 2020
- Rod Prince – vocals, guitar
- Bobby Donaho – drums - Died - April 28, 2021

== Discography ==
=== Singles ===
- "A Taste of the Same" b/w "I'm a King Bee" (J-Beck/J-1002) 1965
- "Zilch (Pt. 1)" b/w "Zilch (Pt. 2)" (J-Beck/J-1003) 1965
- "All Night Long" b/w "Sick and Tired" (J-Beck/J-1005 ) 1966

=== EPs ===
- "I’m a King Bee"/"A Taste of the Same"/Sick and Tired"/"All Night Long" (Sundazed/SEP 199) 2009

=== Compilation albums ===
- The J-Beck Story Part 1: Bad Seeds (Eva/EVA 12034) 1983
- A Texas Battle of the Bands (Collectables/COL-0652) 1995
- Bad Seeds/Liberty Bell (Eva/642440) 1997
