= Living It Down =

Single by Freddy Fender

from the album If You're Ever in Texas
- B-side: "Take Her a Message, I'm Lonely"
- Released: 1976
- Studio: SugarHill (Houston, Texas)
- Genre: Country
- Label: Dot
- Songwriter(s): Ben Peters

Freddy Fender singles chronology
"Vaya con Dios" (1976)	"Living It Down" (1976)	"The Rains Came" (1977)

"Living It Down" is a single by American country music artist Freddy Fender. Released in 1976, it was the first single from his album If You're Ever in Texas. The song peaked at number 2 on the Billboard Hot Country Singles chart. It also reached number 1 on the RPM Country Tracks chart in Canada.

== Chart performance ==
Chart (1976)	Peak position
U.S. Billboard Hot Country Singles	2
U.S. Billboard Hot 100	72
Canadian RPM Country Tracks	1
