= Your Cheatin' Heart (Freddy Fender album) =

Studio album by Freddy Fender
- Released: 1976
- Genre: Tejano

Freddy Fender chronology
Rock 'n' Country (1976)	Your Cheatin' Heart (1976)	If You're Ever in Texas (1976)

Your Cheatin' Heart is an album by Freddy Fender that was released in 1976.

== Track listing ==
1. "Let the Good Times Roll"
2. "High School Dance"
3. "You Don't Have To Go"
4. "Lovers' Quarrel"
5. "Three Wishes"
6. "Your Cheatin' Heart"
7. "Crazy Kat"
8. "I Got A Woman"
9. "Whip It on Me"
