= SugarHill Recording Studios =

Music recording studio in Houston, Texas, US

Coordinates: 29.707989°N 95.324941°W

- Formerly: Quinn Recording; Gold Star Studio
- Industry: Recording studio
- Founded: Houston, Texas, U.S. (1941)
- Founder: Bill Quinn
- Headquarters: Houston, U.S.
- Number of locations: 1
- Key people: Dan Workman; Huey P. Meaux; Bill Quinn
- Website: sugarhillstudios.com

SugarHill Recording Studios is a music recording studio located at 5628 Brock Street in Houston, Texas. Originally founded by Bill Quinn in 1941 as Quinn Recording, it is the oldest continuously operating studio in the United States. Renamed Gold Star Studios in 1950, the studio was important in launching the careers of such artists as Lightnin' Hopkins, The Big Bopper, George Jones, the Sir Douglas Quintet, and Roy Head. In 1972 under new ownership, the studio's name was changed to SugarHill Recording Studios. Artists who have recorded at SugarHill include Freddy Fender, Lucinda Williams, Selena, Destiny's Child, Beyoncé, Lee Ann Womack, Lil Wayne, J. Cole and many others. A landmark in the Houston music community, the studio is renowned for its collection of vintage recording equipment, reverb chamber rooms, EMT plate reverbs and a long history of music.

== History ==
=== Gold Star Studios ===
In 1939 Bill Quinn settled in Houston and established the Quinn Radio Service, a radio repair shop. After being intrigued by a home disc recorder he was asked to repair, he purchased one and began to experiment with it. In 1941 he opened a shop at 3104 Telephone Road in Houston, Texas, where he recorded personalized voice messages. Quinn renamed the business Quinn Recording Company and soon began recording radio jingles. Venturing into music production in 1944, he founded the short-lived Gulf Record Company label.

In 1946, Quinn founded Gold Star Records, initially recording local country (or "hillbilly") artists before expanding to record local Cajun and blues artists. In 1947, Gold Star had its first hit record, "Jole Blon" by Harry Choates, a swing and dance tune that and became the first and only Cajun record to reach the Billboard Top Five. In 1948, Lightnin' Hopkins' began recording at the studio, with "T-Model Blues" and "Tim Moore's Farm" both becoming top 10 national hits.

In 1950, Quinn moved the studio into the first floor of his family home at 5628 Brock Street, just a few blocks from the original studio, and changed the name to Gold Star Studios. By early 1951 all recording for Gold Star Records had ceased, with Quinn selling or leasing his catalogue of Gold Star master recordings to other labels and utilizing Gold Star Studios to record for other labels. The studio's success continued with numerous hit recordings for Pappy Daily's Starday and D labels, including George Jones' first hit "Why Baby Why" (1955) and subsequent hit singles "What Am I Worth" (1955), "You Gotta Be My Baby" (1956), "Just One More" (1956), "Yearning" (1957), "Don't Stop the Music" (1957).

Willie Nelson's first two hits as a songwriter, "Family Bible" (recorded by Claude Gray) and "Night Life" (recorded by Nelson himself), were recorded at Gold Star. Other artists recording at Gold Star Studios in the 1950s included Benny Barnes, Eddie Noack and James O'Gwynn. J.P. Richardson, better known as The Big Bopper, also had two hits recorded at Gold Star, "Running Bear" (recorded by Johnny Preston), and the huge hit "Chantilly Lace" (recorded by Richardson himself).

Beginning in 1963, blues, gospel, and R&B mogul Don Robey utilized Gold Star's engineering services and studio for numerous tracks for release on his Back Beat Records, Duke Records, Peacock Records, and Sure-Shot record labels and their subsidiaries. The following year Chris Strachwitz made his first recordings of Clifton Chenier for the Arhoolie Records label at Gold Star. In 1965, Huey P. Meaux (known as the "Crazy Cajun") produced two hits at the studio: "She's About a Mover" by the Sir Douglas Quintet and its frontman Doug Sahm, and "Treat Her Right" by Roy Head and The Traits. He also recorded portions of B. J. Thomas' first commercially successful album, Tomorrow Never Comes at the studio. Other artists recording at Gold Star Studios in the 1960s included Sunny & the Sunglows, Archie Bell & the Drells. The Pozo-Seco Singers recorded their hit "Time" at Gold Star, helping launch the music career of Don Williams.

In the mid-1960s, J. L. Patterson leased the studio from Quinn, who was retiring. In January 1968, Houston independent record label International Artists (IA) leased the studios, which became instrumental with Texas psychedelic rock bands including: 13th Floor Elevators, the Red Crayola, Bubble Puppy, The Continental Five, The Bad Seeds, Zakary Thaks, and ZZ Top predecessor Moving Sidewalks. For a brief period in 1969 and 1970 the facility was known as International Artists Studios. IA purchased the studio from J. L. Patterson in a questionable transaction (as Patterson himself was only leasing the facility from Quinn). In 1969 IA filed for bankruptcy, and Gold Star Studios went into receivership.

=== SugarHill Recording Studios ===
In late 1971, longtime Gold Star producer Huey Meaux bought the studios out of receivership and renamed the facility SugarHill Recording Studios. In 1972, Marcia Ball recorded her first album with her progressive country band Freda and the Firedogs. The following year, Meaux acquired additional adjacent property to expand and refurbish the studios, and that October, Little Feat, who were in Houston for two concert dates, recorded a 25-minute four-song set at SugarHill for live radio broadcast on KPFT 90.1 FM.

Beginning in 1974, Meaux produced a string of hits with Freddy Fender at the studios, including “Before The Next Teardrop Falls” (1975), “Wasted Days and Wasted Nights” (1975), “Secret Love#Freddy Fender version” (1975), You'll Lose a Good Thing" (1976) and "Living It Down" (1976). Between 1975 and 1983, Meaux and Fender issued 28 charting singles from SugarHill.

SugarHill was the site of some of Asleep At The Wheel's early recordings, as well as Gubernatorial candidate Kinky Friedman's 1976 LP Lasso from El Paso. In 1980, Lucinda Williams recorded her first all-originals album, Happy Woman Blues at SugarHill. Other artists recording at SugarHill in the late '70s and early '80s included Ricky Nelson, James Burton, Todd Rundgren, the Amboy Dukes with Ted Nugent, Jandek, and Houston punk band Really Red. Tejano band Little Joe y la Familia recorded at SugarHill, as did Selena on some of her earliest recordings.

In August 1983, a tornado generated by Hurricane Alicia ripped a large hole in the roof of SugarHill Studio B, which was water-damaged. While the roof repair was covered by insurance, damaged gear and other technical issues rendered it unusable. In 1984, with studio profits dwindling, Meaux put the studio complex up for sale.

In 1986, Modern Music Ventures (MMV), a recently formed umbrella corporation that eventually encompassed the Discos MM record label, three publishing companies, an artist management company, and a music foundation, purchased SugarHill Recording Studios from Meaux. As part of the agreement, Meaux continued leasing an office in the building.

MMV immediately invested in a complete remodel of SugarHill Studio B. Due to MMV's many business interests, the studios consequently became the home base for a number of successful Tejano recording artists including Emilio Navaira, La Fiebre, Excellencia, country star Johnny Rodriquez and Adalberto Gallegos. Discos MM, MMV's own Tejano label, released hit records by Elsa Garcia, Jerry Rodriguez and Mercedes (album Rebelde 1990), and The Hometown Boys. Members of influential Australian rock band, Radio Birdman, Deniz Tek and Chris Masuak, arrived in the early 90s to record their solo albums.

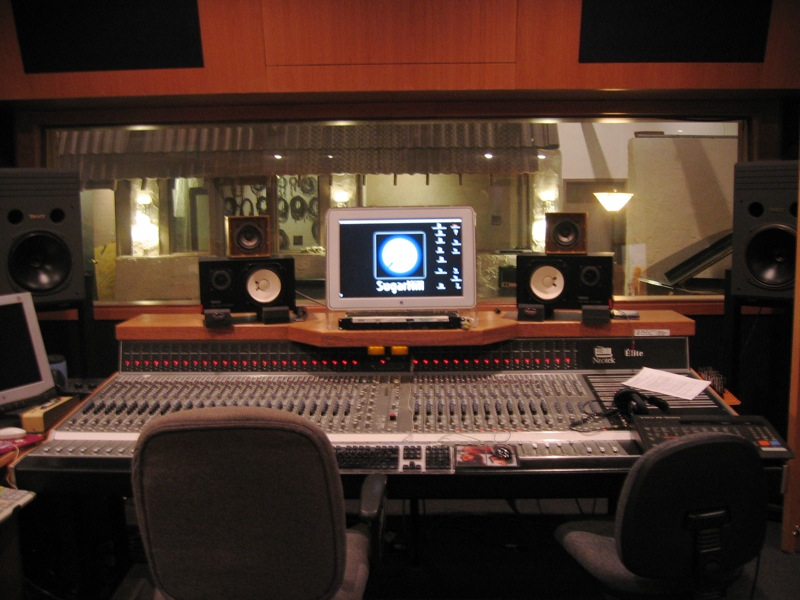
Studio A - SugarHill Recording Studios

In 1996, RAD Audio, a company formed by engineers Rodney Meyers, Andy Bradley, and Dan Workman, bought the studio from MMV. Extensive renovations and upgrades to the building, its studios, and recording equipment were completed by February 2000.

In 1998, Mathew Knowles contacted the studio to book studio time for Destiny's Child to begin recording what would become their sophomore breakthrough album, The Writing's on the Wall. The group returned to SugarHill during the recording of Survivor. Beyoncé would return to SugarHill to re-record the Destiny's Child song, "Dangerously in Love", which became the title track of her debut solo album. Other artists recording at the studio in the early 2000s included Solange Knowles, Brian McKnight, Twista, and Clay Walker.

The 2000s ushered in many changes in the music production industry, not the least of which was a massive rise in home recording. In 2006, SugarHill partnered with the Pacifica Radio Network and launched The SugarHill Sessions, a radio show on Pacifica' Houston affiliate KPFT 90.1 FM. The show was created as a platform to encourage local music and to highlight live independent music in the Gulf Coast region. The show has profiled indie artists including Marah (Yep Roc Records), Bring Back The Guns, Ume (Pretty Activity), Jana Hunter (Gnomonsong), Spain Colored Orange (Lucid Records), Todd Snider (Universal) and The Long Winters (Barsuk). Artists recording at the studio in the mid-2000s included Frank Black, Johnny Bush, Johnny Nash, Southern Backtones, Jandek, Maggie Walters, IB3, Calvin Owens, Trystan Layne, and Shei Atkins.

In December 2008, the studio teamed up with Zenfilm and introduced a monthly video podcast, to give the audience a "behind the scenes" glimpse of recording sessions followed by interviews of the artists.

In 2017 Lee Ann Womack, who said she wanted to get out of Nashville and tap into the deep music and vibe of East Texas, chose SugarHill to record her Grammy-nominated album The Lonely, the Lonesome & the Gone. That year Ryan Youngblood and two business partners bought SugarHill from RAD Audio. Other artists recording or mixing projects at SugarHill in the late 2010s included Chance the Rapper, George Thorogood, Kevin Gates, 21 Savage, Maxo Kream and North Mississippi Allstars.
