= Joe Barry (singer) =

American swamp pop singer (1939–2004)

- Born: Joseph Barrios; July 13, 1939
- Origin: Cut Off, Louisiana, U.S.
- Died: August 31, 2004 (aged 65) Cut Off, Louisiana, U.S.
- Genres: Swamp pop; Rock and roll
- Occupation: Singer
- Instrument: Vocals
- Years active: 1958–2003
- Labels: SOM, Jin, Smash, Princess, Pic-1, Sho-Biz, Houma, Lodestone, Nugget, Crazy Cajun, ABC Dot, Ripete, Good Old Gold
- Formerly of: Dukes of Rhythm, Delphis

Joe Barry (born Joseph Barrios; July 13, 1939 – August 31, 2004) was an American swamp pop singer active on the early rock and roll scene.

== Biography ==
Barry was born in Cut Off, Louisiana. He moved to New Orleans in 1957, and started recording] in 1958.

Barry released his first singles "Greatest Moment Of My Life" on Jin Records in 1960. In 1961, the second single for the label, "I'm a Fool to Care" (originally a hit for Les Paul and Mary Ford), was picked up for national distribution by Mercury Records subsidiary Smash Records. The tune hit No. 15 on the U.S. Black Singles chart and No. 24 on the Billboard Hot 100. "I'm a Fool to Care" sold over one million copies by 1968, earning a gold record designation. The song also charted in the UK Singles Chart at No. 49. The follow-up single, "Teardrops in My Heart", also charted in the U.S. but did not reach the Top 40. Barry released several more singles on Smash and Nugget Records later in the 1960s, but left the music industry soon after. During his career in 1960 or 1961 Joe Barry also appeared on Dick Clark's American Bandstand.

Barry returned to music in 1977, releasing a full-length country album, and followed with a religious album in 1980. He had a serious problems in his heart and lungs which prevented him from continuing a career in music later in his life.

In 2003, when he released an album which took several years of overdubbing to complete due to his physical limitations. The album Been Down that Muddy Road was produced by Aaron Fuchs of Night Train International in New York City, along with Pershing Wells and Michael Vice of Houma, Louisiana. The band Blue Eyed Soul Revue was used on all the tracks.

Barry died in his birthplace of Cut Off, Louisiana, on August 31, 2004, at age 65.

== Discography ==
- Joe Barry (ABC Records/Dot Records, 1977)
- Sweet Rose of Sharon (1980)
- I'm a Fool to Care: The Complete Recordings 1958–1977 (compilation) (Night Train Records, 1999)
- Been Down that Muddy Road (Night Train, 2003)
