= Freddy Fender =

American Tejano singer (1937–2006)

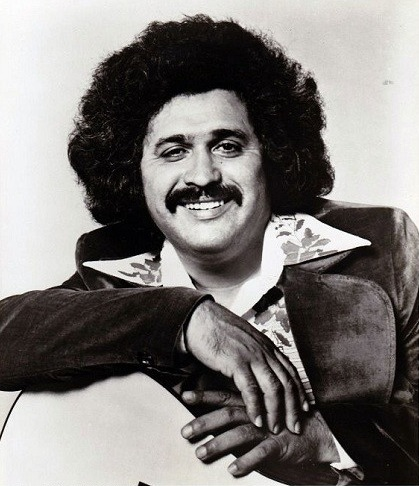
- Fender in 1974

Background information
- Also known as: El Bebop Kid; Scotty Wayne
- Born: Baldemar Garza Huerta; June 4, 1937; San Benito, Texas, U.S.
- Died: October 14, 2006 (aged 69) Corpus Christi, Texas, U.S.
- Genres: Tejano; country; rock; swamp pop
- Occupations: Singer; guitarist
- Instruments: Vocals; guitar
- Years active: 1957–2005
- Labels: MCA; ABC; Arista; Reprise
- Website: freddyfender.com
- Military Service
- Allegiance: United States
- Branch: United States Marine Corps
- Service years: 1953–1956

Freddy Fender (born Baldemar Garza Huerta; June 4, 1937 – October 14, 2006) was an American country and Tejano singer and songwriter, known for his work as a solo artist and in the groups Los Super Seven and the Texas Tornados. His signature sound fused country, rock, rockabilly, swamp pop and Tex-Mex styles.

Active since the 1950s, when he got his start playing Spanish-language rock and roll for Tejano audiences, Fender's mainstream breakthrough came in 1975 with the crossover hit "Before the Next Teardrop Falls," which topped Billboard's pop and country charts. He recorded further country hits such as "Wasted Days and Wasted Nights," "Secret Love," "You'll Lose a Good Thing," "Living It Down," and "The Rains Came."

== Early years ==
Fender was born in San Benito, Texas, United States, to Margarita Garza and her Mexican husband, Serapio Huerta. He made his debut radio performance at age 10 on Harlingen, Texas, radio station KGBT, singing a then-hit "Paloma Querida."

Fender dropped out of high school at age 16 in 1953, and, when he turned 17, he enlisted for three years in the U.S. Marine Corps. He served time in the brig on several occasions because of his drinking, and he was court-martialed in August 1956 and discharged with the rank of private (E-1). According to Fender, he later received a letter from the Department of the Navy stating that he wrongfully received a dishonorable discharge because of alcoholism, and he was given a general discharge. He returned to Texas and played nightclubs, bars, and honky-tonks throughout the south, mostly to Latino audiences. In 1957, then known as El Bebop Kid, he released two songs to moderate success in Mexico and South America: Spanish-language versions of Elvis Presley's "Don't Be Cruel" (as "No Seas Cruel") and Harry Belafonte's "Jamaica Farewell." He also recorded his own Spanish version of Hank Williams' "Cold, Cold Heart" under the title "Tu Frío Corazón" ("Your Cold Heart").

He became known for his rockabilly music and Eddie con los Shades persona. In 1958, he legally changed his name from Baldemar Huerta to Freddy Fender. He took the name Fender from the guitar and amplifier, and Freddy because the alliteration sounded good and would "sell better with gringos!" He then relocated to California.

== Initial success ==
In 1959, Fender recorded the self-penned blues ballad "Wasted Days and Wasted Nights." The song was a hit, but he was beset by legal troubles in May 1960 after he and a band member were arrested for possession of marijuana in Baton Rouge, Louisiana. After serving nearly three years in the Louisiana State Penitentiary, he was released through the intervention of then-governor Jimmie Davis, also a songwriter and musician. Davis requested that Fender stay away from music while on probation as a condition of his release. However, in a 1990 NPR interview on Fresh Air with Terry Gross (rebroadcast October 17, 2006), Fender said that the condition for parole was to stay away from places that served alcohol. Three singles were released in the early 1960s under the name Scotty Wayne.

By the end of the 1960s, Fender was back in Corpus Christi, Texas, working as a mechanic and attending local institution, Del Mar College, while playing music only on the weekends.

== Number one on pop and country charts ==
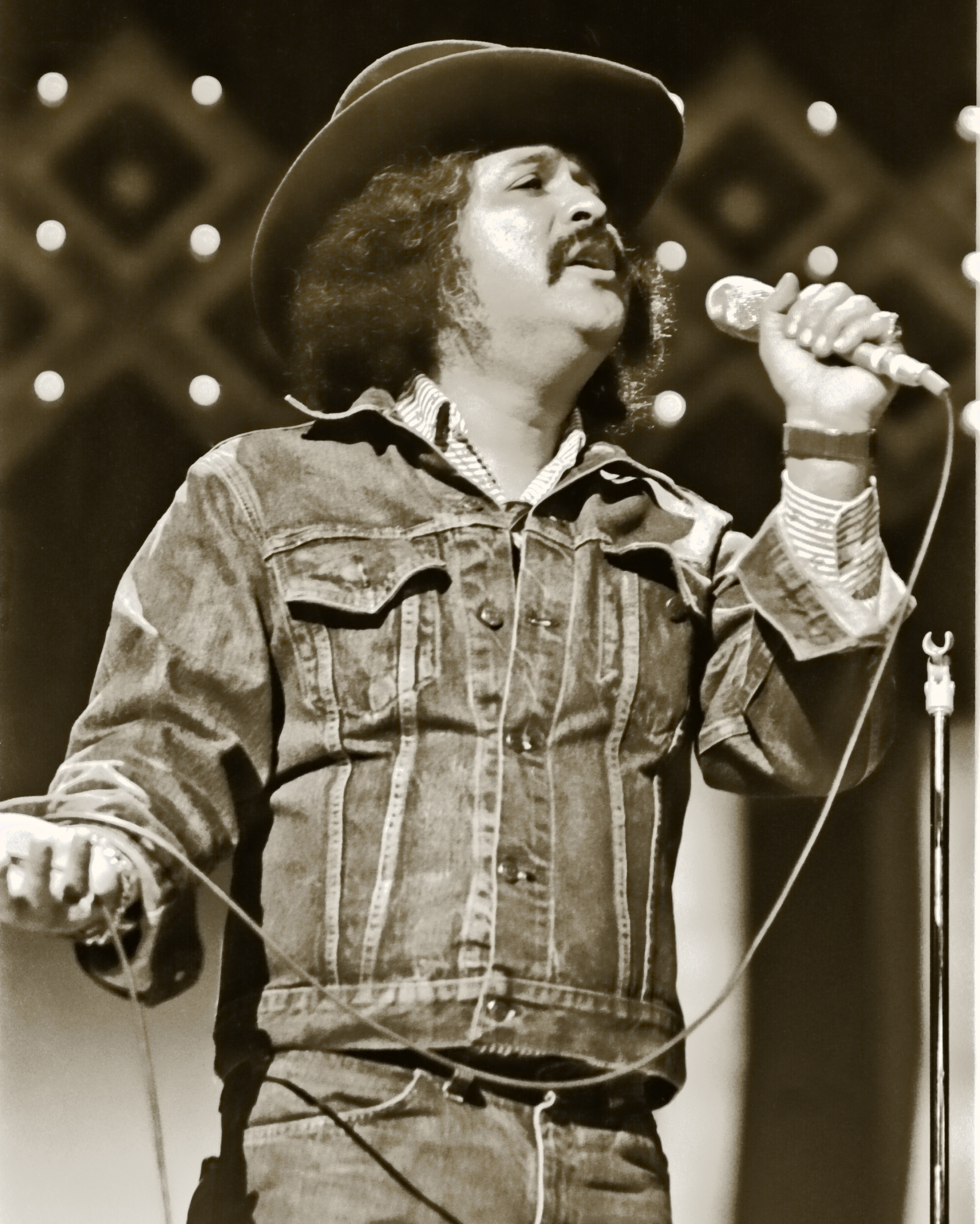
Freddy Fender performing in 1977

In 1974 Fender recorded crossover ballad "Before the Next Teardrop Falls." The single was selected for national distribution and became a number-one hit on the Billboard Country and Pop charts. It sold over a million copies and was awarded a gold disc by the RIAA in May 1975. His next three singles, "Secret Love," "You'll Lose a Good Thing," and a remake of his own "Wasted Days and Wasted Nights," all reached number one on the Billboard Country chart. Between 1975 and 1983, Fender charted 21 country hits, including "Since I Met You Baby," "Vaya con Dios," "Livin' It Down," and "The Rains Came." "Wasted Days and Wasted Nights" became Fender's second million-selling single, with the gold disc presentation taking place in September 1975.

Fender was also successful on the pop music charts. Besides "Before the Next Teardrop Falls" reaching number one on the pop chart in May 1975, "Wasted Days And Wasted Nights" went into the pop top 10 and "Secret Love" into the top 20. "Since I Met You Baby," "You'll Lose A Good Thing," (his last pop top 40) "Vaya con Dios," and "Livin' It Down" (his last to reach the pop top 100) all did well on the pop chart.

At the Amusement & Music Operators Association (AMOA) Jukebox Awards in 1975, Fender was awarded "Artist of the Year" and "Record of the Year" for having the highest-earning songs played on jukebox machines in the United States.

=== Swamp pop influences ===
Fender was heavily influenced by the swamp pop sound from southern Louisiana and southeast Texas, as is shown by his recording swamp pop standards on his 1978 album Swamp Gold. One of his major hits, "Wasted Days and Wasted Nights," has a typical swamp pop ballad arrangement. Fender associated with swamp pop musicians such as Joe Barry and Rod Bernard, and issued many recordings on labels owned by Huey P. Meaux, a Cajun who specialized in swamp pop. As music writer John Broven observed, "Although Freddy was a Chicano from Texas marketed as a country artist, much of his formative career was spent in South Louisiana; spiritually, Fender's music was from the Louisiana swamps."

== Later years ==
=== Texas Tornados ===
In 1989, Fender teamed up with fellow Tex–Mex musicians Doug Sahm, Flaco Jiménez, and Augie Meyers to form the Texas Tornados, whose work meshed conjunto, Tejano, R&B, country, and blues to wide acclaim. When the Texas Tornados went to audition for Warner Bros. Records, Fender did not think that the group was strong enough, so he brought his own band. The audition was nearly a bust, because he played country music and that was not what the executives were looking for. Fender was persuaded to play some vintage rock and blues numbers, which was what the executives were looking for, and was subsequently given a record contract. After being a solo act, Fender was not sure if signing with a group was a good thing, but according to Fender, he "just wanted to record for a major label."

The group released four albums and won a Grammy Award in 1990 for Best Mexican American Performance for the track "Soy de San Luis". Fender described the group in this way: "You've heard of New Kids on the Block? Well, we're the Old Guys in the Street." Following the death of Sahm, the Tornados' production slowed. A live 1990 appearance on TV's Austin City Limits, one of three the group made, was released in 2005 as part of the Live From Austin, Texas, series.

=== Los Super 7 ===
In the late 1990s, Fender joined another supergroup, Los Super Seven, with Los Lobos' David Hidalgo and César Rosas, Flaco Jiménez, Ruben Ramos, Joe Ely, and country singer Rick Trevino. The group won a 1998 Grammy in the Mexican American Performance category for their self-titled disc.

=== Later work ===
In 2001, Fender made his final studio recording, a collection of classic Mexican boleros titled La Música de Baldemar Huerta that brought him a third Grammy award, this time in the category of Latin Pop Album. Joe Reyes, who worked with Fender in 2004 for a Texas Folklife and Austin tribute titled "Fifty Years of Freddy Fender," said of the album: "When he did Mexican standards at that point in his career, I expected it to be good because he's a perfectionist. But that record is so beautifully recorded; his voice is perfection. I was so proud it was coming back to his roots."

== Death ==
On March 13, 2001, Fender was erroneously reported to be dead by Billboard. He laughed off the magazine's error. He underwent a kidney transplant in 2002, with the organ being donated by his daughter, and underwent a liver transplant in 2004. Nonetheless, his condition continued to worsen. He was suffering from an "incurable cancer" which had left him with tumors on his lungs.

He died on October 14, 2006, at the age of 69 of lung cancer at his home in Corpus Christi, Texas, with his family at his bedside. He was buried in his hometown of San Benito.

He said in a 2004 interview with the Associated Press that he wished to become the first Mexican American inducted into the Country Music Hall of Fame.

== Legacy ==
Fender received a star on the Hollywood Walk of Fame in 1999.

On June 5, 2005, Fender was present for the dedication of a $1.4 million water tower in San Benito. The tower bears an image of Fender along with the words "San Benito Hometown of Freddy Fender," and is visible when driving east on U.S. Route 83 through San Benito. On December 31, 2005, Fender performed his last concert and resumed chemotherapy.

A Freddy Fender Museum and The Conjunto Music Museum opened November 17, 2007, in San Benito. They share a building with the San Benito Historical Museum. His family maintains the Freddy Fender Scholarship Fund and donates to philanthropic causes that Fender supported.

== Film credits ==
Fender received acting credits in three films:

- In 1977, He appeared as Tony in the prison movie, Short Eyes, a film adaptation, directed by Robert M. Young, of the Miguel Pinero play.
- In 1979 Fender played the role of Pancho Villa in She Came to the Valley (later released as Texas in Flames). The movie was directed by Albert Band and based on the book by Cleo Dawson. Fender appeared as himself in an episode of the television series The Dukes of Hazzard.
- In 1988, Fender played the mayor of a small town in the Robert Redford–directed film, The Milagro Beanfield War.

== Discography ==
=== Albums ===
Year	Album	Peak chart positions				Certifications	
Year	Album	US Country	US	AUS	CAN	RIAA	CRIA
1974	Before the Next Teardrop Falls	1	20	42	10	Gold	Gold
1975	Recorded Inside Louisiana State Prison	—	—	—	—	—	—
1975	Are You Ready for Freddy?	1	41	97	34	—	—
1975	Since I Met You Baby	10	203	—	—	—	—
1976	Rock 'n' Country	3	59	98	—	—	—
1976	Your Cheatin' Heart	—	—	—	—	—	—
1976	If You're Ever in Texas	4	170	—	—	—	—
1977	The Best of Freddy Fender	4	155	—	—	—	—
1977	If You Don't Love Me	34	—	—	—	—	—
1977	Merry Christmas / Feliz Navidad	—	—	—	—	—	—
1978	Swamp Gold	44	—	—	—	—	—
1978	His Greatest Recordings	—	—	—	—	—	—
1979	Tex-Mex^{A}	—	—	—	—	—	—
1979	The Texas Balladeer	—	—	—	—	—	—
1980	Together We Drifted Apart	—	—	—	—	—	—
1982	The Border Soundtrack	—	—	—	—	—	—
1991	The Freddy Fender Collection	—	—	—	—	—	—
1991	Favorite Ballads	—	—	—	—	—	—
2001	Forever Gold	70	—	—	—	—	—
2002	La Música de Baldemar Huerta	—	—	—	—	—	—

- ^{A}Tex Mex peaked at No. 6 on the RPM Country Albums chart in Canada.

=== Singles ===
Year	Single	Peak chart positions								Certifications (sales threshold)	Album
Year	Single	US Country	US	US AC	CAN Country	CAN	CAN AC	NZ	AUS	Certifications (sales threshold)	Album
1960	"Holy One"	—	107	—	—	—	—	—	—		—N/a
1975	"Before the Next Teardrop Falls"	1	1	19	1	6	18	2	1	US: Gold	Before the Next Teardrop Falls
1975	"Wasted Days and Wasted Nights"	1	8	9	2	6	14	1	9	US: Gold	Before the Next Teardrop Falls
1975	"Since I Met You Baby"	10	45	—	—	52	—	—	—		Since I Met You Baby
1975	"Secret Love"	1	20	10	1	38	7	10	33		Are You Ready for Freddy?
1976	"The Wild Side of Life"	13	—	—	—	—	—	—	—		Since I Met You Baby
1976	"You'll Lose a Good Thing"	1	32	28	—	—	—	24	—		Rock 'N' Country
1976	"Vaya con Dios"	7	59	41	1	—	48	—	—		Rock 'N' Country
1976	"Living It Down"	2	72	—	1	—	—	—	—		If You're Ever in Texas
1977	"The Rains Came"	4	—	—	1	—	—	—	—		Rock ’n’ Country
1977	"If You Don't Love Me (Why Don't You Just Leave Me Alone)"	11	—	—	16	—	—	—	—		If You Don't Love Me
1977	"Think About Me"	18	—	—	10	—	—	—	—		If You Don't Love Me
1978	"If You're Looking for a Fool"	34	—	—	—	—	—	—	—		If You Don't Love Me
1978	"Talk to Me"	13	103	—	10	—	—	—	—		Swamp Gold
1978	"I'm Leaving It All Up to You"	26	—	—	20	—	—	—	—		Swamp Gold
1979	"Walking Piece of Heaven"	22	—	—	13	—	—	—	—		Tex-Mex
1979	"Yours"	22	—	—	23	—	—	—	—		The Texas Balladeer
1979	"Squeeze Box"	61	—	—	—	—	—	—	—		The Texas Balladeer
1980	"My Special Prayer"	83	—	—	—	—	—	—	—		The Texas Balladeer
1980	"Please Talk to My Heart"	82	—	—	—	—	—	—	—		Together We Drifted Apart
1983	"Chokin' Kind"	87	—	—	—	—	—	—	—		—N/a
"—" denotes releases that did not chart

== Honors and awards ==
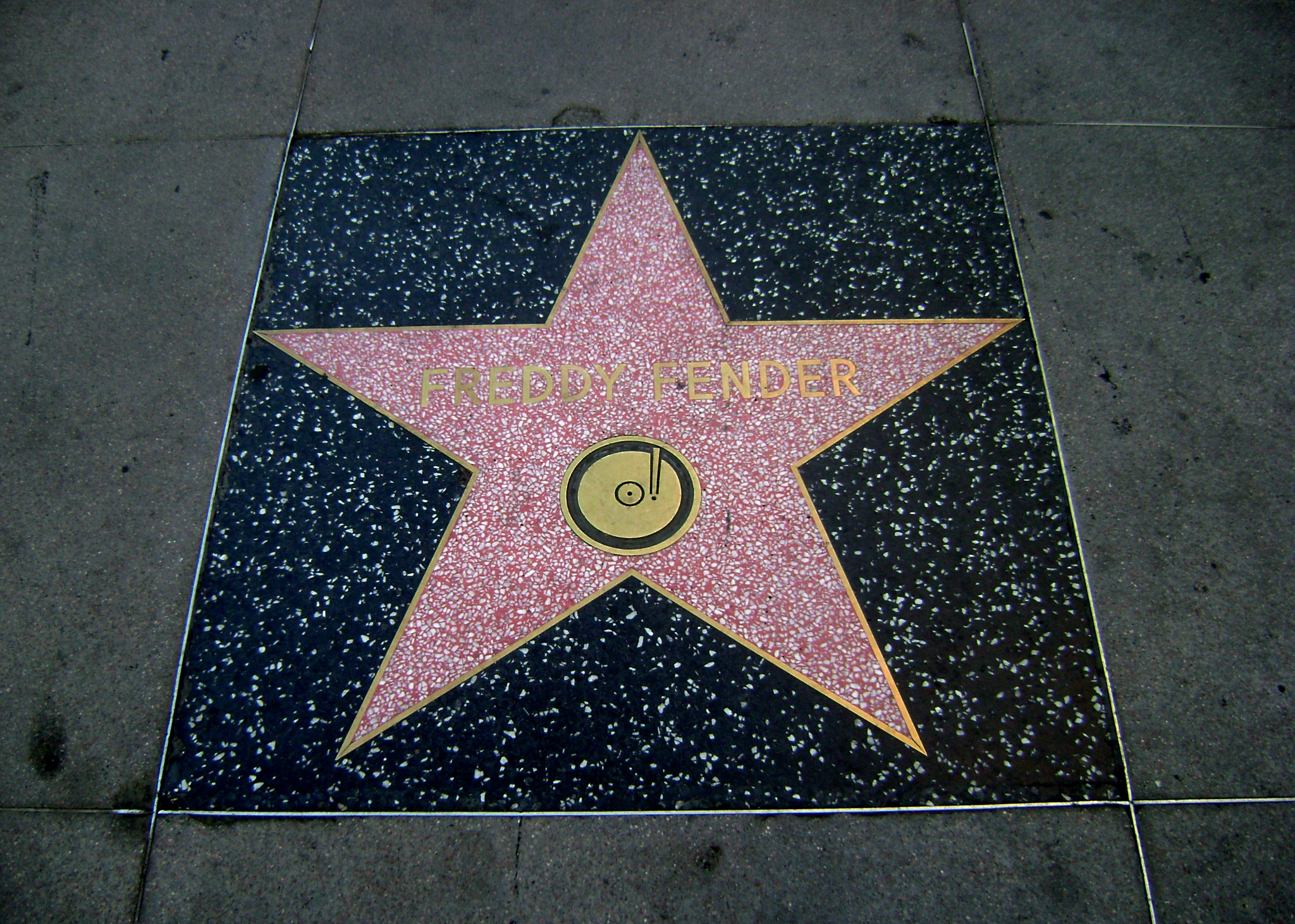
Fender's star on the Hollywood Walk of Fame

- Academy of Country Music (1975) — "Most Promising Male Vocalist"
- Country Music Association (1975) — "Single of the Year" for "Before the Next Teardrop Falls"
- Grammy nominations in 1975, 1976, and 1997
- Tejano Music Hall of Fame (1987)
- Inaugural Balls — Presidents Bill Clinton and George H. W. Bush
- Grammy Award for Best Mexican/Mexican-American Album (1990) — for the Texas Tornados
- European Walk of Fame (1993) — in Rotterdam, the Netherlands
- Freddy Fender Lane (1994) — dedicated in his hometown of San Benito, Texas
- Hollywood Walk of Fame (1999)
- Texas Music Hall Of Fame (1999)
- Nashville Sidewalk of Stars (1999)
- Grammy Award "Best Mexican/American Performance" (1999) — for Los Super Seven
- Louisiana Hall Of Fame (2001)
- Grammy Award "Best Latin Pop" (2002) — for La Musica de Baldemar Huerta
- Annual Freddy Fender Humanitarian Award
- The Freddy Fender Water Tower in San Benito besides STEAM Academy (2009)
- Texas Historical Marker – for contributions to Tejano, rock, and country music (2023)

== See also ==
- Hispanics in the United States Marine Corps
