= Since I Met You Baby (song) =

Song written and performed by Ivory Joe Hunter

Single by Ivory Joe Hunter
- B-side: "You Can't Stop This Rocking And Rolling"
- Released: October 26, 1956 (U.S.)
- Recorded: 1956
- Genre: Rhythm and blues, pop
- Length: 2:41
- Label: Atlantic 1111 (U.S.); Quality 1567 (Canada); Columbia DB 3872 (U.K.)
- Songwriter: Ivory Joe Hunter
- Producers: Ahmet Ertegun and Jerry Wexler

"Since I Met You Baby"

Single by Sonny James

from the album The Astrodome Presents in Person Sonny James
- B-side: "Clinging to a Hope"
- Released: August 1969 (U.S.)
- Recorded: 1969
- Genre: Country
- Length: 2:48
- Label: Capitol
- Songwriter: Ivory Joe Hunter
- Producer: George Richey

Sonny James singles chronology
| "Running Bear" (1969) | "Since I Met You Baby" (1969) | "It's Just a Matter of Time" (1970) |

"Since I Met You Baby" is an American rhythm and blues song written and recorded by pianist Ivory Joe Hunter. The song, which Hunter recorded in 1956, became an American standard, and saw renewed popularity in 1969 when country music artist Sonny James released his hit version.

== Song background ==
Hunter had already tasted major success with popular and rhythm and blues audiences with songs such as "I Almost Lost My Mind". He moved to Atlantic Records by 1954, and around that time wrote "Since I Met You Baby."

The song, a 12-bar blues, was described by AllMusic critic Steve Huey as "a masterpiece of smooth, bluesy elegance" and "decidedly removed from the tide of raucous rock & roll sweeping the country." In fact, compared to many of the other uptempo, rock-beat songs of the period, the song was "augmented by a wordless vocal choir (supervised by Ray Ellis who also did the orchestral arrangement) that's strongly reminiscent of traditional pop recordings of the period," wrote Huey. Saxophonist Jesse Powell provided the harmony on the second verse.

"Since I Met You Baby" topped the Billboard magazine Rhythm and Blues Records chart for three weeks in 1957, and became Hunter's only Billboard Hot 100 entry, stopping at No. 12.

Atlantic licensed the recording to Quality Records in Canada and EMI's Columbia label in the UK.

Hunter was presented with a gold record for this song which was awarded during his appearance on The Ed Sullivan Show.

== Cover versions ==
=== Sonny James ===
Sonny James had major success covering pop standards, both of the present time and of the past, during the 1960s. In 1969 alone, he had reached the top of the Billboard Hot Country Singles chart with two such covers: "Only the Lonely" and "Running Bear."

"Since I Met You Baby" was James' third cover song released during 1969. Supposedly recorded live (the song's introduction and fade out features a cheering audience), the audience was added to the studio recording. James took the song to No. 1 on the Hot Country Singles chart that October. His 13th chart-topper overall, the song was his ninth consecutive country No. 1 in an eventual string of 16 straight chart-toppers in as many single releases, dating between 1967 and 1971.

=== Other artists ===
Mindy Carson had a chart version of the song in 1957.

Sam Cooke included this song on his 1961 album, My Kind of Blues.

The Spencer Davis Group recorded a version on their second UK album The Second Album (1966), Fontana TL5295.

Country-Tejano artist Freddy Fender had a major country hit in the mid-1970s with a Spanish version of the song, "Desde Que Conozco", which featured in John Sayles's 1996 movie, Lone Star.

Countless other artists have recorded "Since I Met You Baby," and they represented a wide range of genres. A partial listing includes Neil Young, Pat Boone, Sandy Posey, Bill Anderson, Paul Evans, Mickey Gilley, Bruce Channel, Sam Cooke, Willy DeVille, José Feliciano, Oscar Harris, Narvel Felts, B.B. King, Wanda Jackson, Solomon Burke, Jerry Lee Lewis, Dean Martin, Lou Rawls, Gary Moore, Bobby Vee, Black Joe Lewis and the Honeybears, and Johnny "Guitar" Watson.

== Chart performance ==
=== Ivory Joe Hunter ===
| Chart (1956) | Peak position |
|---|---|
| U.S. Hot Rhythm & Blues Singles | 1 |
| U.S. Billboard Hot 100 | 12 |

=== Mindy Carson ===
| Chart (1956) | Peak position |
|---|---|
| U.S. Billboard Hot 100 | 34 |

=== Bobby Vee ===
| Chart (1960) | Peak position |
|---|---|
| U.S. Billboard Hot 100 | 81 |

=== Sonny James ===
| Chart (1969) | Peak position |
|---|---|
| U.S. Billboard Hot Country Singles | 1 |
| U.S. Billboard Hot 100 | 65 |
| Canadian RPM Top Country Singles | 3 |
| Canadian RPM Top Singles | 79 |
| Canadian RPM Adult Contemporary | 38 |

=== Freddy Fender ===
| Chart (1975) | Peak position |
|---|---|
| U.S. Billboard Hot Country Singles | 10 |
| U.S. Billboard Hot 100 | 45 |
| Canadian RPM Top Singles | 52 |
