= Huey P. Meaux =

American record producer and studio owner (1929–2011)

- Meaux's 1996 mug shot
- Born: Huey Purvis Meaux; March 10, 1929; Wright, Louisiana, U.S.
- Died: April 23, 2011 (aged 82); Winnie, Texas, U.S.
- Occupation: Record producer

Huey Purvis Meaux (March 10, 1929 – April 23, 2011) was an American record producer and the owner of various record labels and recording studios, including Crazy Cajun Records, Tribe Records, Tear Drop Records, Capri Records, and SugarHill Recording Studios. He later achieved notoriety after being convicted of child sex offenses committed at his recording studio.

== Biography ==
Meaux was born in Wright, Louisiana. At age 12, he moved to Winnie, Texas. After serving briefly in the U.S. Army, he opened a barbershop in Winnie, where he produced the swamp pop classic "Breaking Up is Hard to Do" by "Jivin'" Gene Bourgeois. He also discovered Barbara Lynn and produced her 1962 hit "You'll Lose a Good Thing".

Nicknamed "The Crazy Cajun", Meaux, hoping to capitalize on the popularity of the British Invasion, put together a band with Doug Sahm and the English-sounding name of the Sir Douglas Quintet and scored a hit with "She's About a Mover". Meaux's other credits included such hits as "Treat Her Right" by Roy Head, "Are You Lonesome Tonight?" by B. J. Thomas; "Before the Next Teardrop Falls" and "Wasted Days and Wasted Nights" (1975) by Freddy Fender; "You'll Lose a Good Thing" by Barbara Lynn; "Talk To Me" by Sunny & the Sunglows; and "Big Blue Diamonds" by Gene Summers. He worked with Jerry Lee Lewis, Johnny Copeland, T-Bone Walker, Rockin' Sidney, Lowell Fulson, Chuck Jackson, Doug Kershaw, Doug Sahm, Rod Bernard, Sonny Landreth, Clifton Chenier, Little Royal, Ronnie Milsap, Mickey Gilley, Delbert McClinton, Dr. John, Clarence "Frogman" Henry, Bob Wills, Lightnin' Hopkins, Tommy McLain, Joe Barry, and Johnny Winter.

In 2010, he formed the record label Freedom Express Records and released an album by Ramon Angel Solis entitled The Mexican Side of Me. Meaux died on April 23, 2011, aged 82.

== 1967 conviction and pardon ==
In September 1966, Meaux and two other men were indicted by a federal grand jury for transporting a 16-year-old girl from Houston, Texas, to Nashville, Tennessee, in October 1965 for "purposes of prostitution" at a country music convention, a violation of the White-Slave Traffic Act. Meaux was convicted in January 1967 and sentenced to three years in federal prison.

Meaux's request for a pardon was approved by President Jimmy Carter on November 1, 1977.

== 1996 raid of record studio, trial, and lawsuit ==
In 1996, a police raid of Meaux's office turned up thousands of Polaroids and videos of underage girls in sexual situations, some being as young as eight. He pleaded guilty to two counts of sexual assault of a child, a drug possession charge, a child pornography charge, and another for jumping bail and briefly fleeing to Juárez, Mexico. He was sentenced to 15 years in prison and would be released to a halfway house in 2002 but was returned to prison months later after receiving sexually explicit photographs from adult women. Meaux was released in 2007.

== See also ==
- Roy Ames
