= Academy of Country Music Awards for Song of the Year =

List of country music award winners

Academy of Country Music Award for Song of the Year
- Country: United States
- Presented by: Academy of Country Music
- First award: 1967
- Currently held by: Ella Langley; Luke Dick; Miranda Lambert; Joybeth Taylor (61st)

This article is the list of winners and nominees for the Academy of Country Music's Song of the Year. The award was first given in 1967. The following is the list of winners, including their nominated work.

Unlike the Country Music Association Award for Song of the Year, this award is not only given to the songwriter(s). It's also given to the publisher(s), and artist(s) for their success in digital media and the impact of the song on consumers and the country music industry, with emphasis on the creative integrity of the song.

Any song released and achieved a Top 50 position on Billboard's Hot Country Songs or Mediabase Country charts during the eligibility period is eligible. However, if the song was released before the eligibility period, but achieved the highest chart position. It is considered eligible.

== Winners and nominees ==
=== 2020s ===
| Year | Winner | Nominees |
|---|---|---|
| 2026 | "Choosin’ Texas" — Ella Langley, Luke Dick, Miranda Lambert, Joybeth Taylor | "A Song to Sing" — Chris Stapleton, Miranda Lambert, Jenee Fleenor, Jesse Frasure; "Am I Okay?" — Megan Moroney, Jessie Jo Dillon, Luke Laird; "I Never Lie" — Zach Top, Carson Chamberlain, Tim Nichols; "Somewhere Over Laredo" — Lainey Wilson, Trannie Anderson, Dallas Wilson, Andy Albert, Harold Arlen, Yip Harburg |
| 2025 | "Dirt Cheap" — Josh Phillips | "4x4xU" — Aaron Raitiere, Jon Decious, Lainey Wilson; "The Architect" — Josh Osborne, Kacey Musgraves, Shane McAnally; "I Had Some Help" — Ashley Gorley, Chandler Paul Walters, Ernest, Jonathan Hoskins, Louis Bell, Morgan Wallen, Ryan Vojtesak, Post Malone; "You Look Like You Love Me" — Aaron Raitiere, Ella Langley, Riley Green |
| 2024 | "Next Thing You Know" – Jordan Davis, Chase McGill, Greylan James, Josh Osborne | "Fast Car" – Tracy Chapman; "Heart Like a Truck" – Trannie Anderson, Dallas Wilson, Lainey Wilson; "Tennessee Orange" – David Fanning, Megan Moroney, Paul Jenkins, Ben Williams; "The Painter" – Benjy Davis, Kat Higgins, Ryan Larkins |
| 2023 | "She Had Me at Heads Carolina" – Ashley Gorley, Cole Swindell, Jesse Frasure, Mark D. Sanders, Thomas Rhett and Tim Nichols | "Sand in My Boots" – Ashley Gorley, Josh Osborne and Michael Hardy; "'Til You Can't" – Ben Stennis and Matt Rogers; "Wait in the Truck" – Hunter Phelps, Jordan Schmidt, Michael Hardy and Renee Blair; "You Should Probably Leave" – Ashley Gorley, Chris DuBois and Chris Stapleton |
| 2022 | "Things a Man Oughta Know" – Jason Nix, Jonathan Singleton, Lainey Wilson | "7 Summers" – Morgan Wallen, Josh Osborne, Shane McAnally; "Buy Dirt" – Jordan Davis, Jacob Davis, Josh Jenkins, Matt Jenkins; "Fancy Like" – Cameron Bartolini, Walker Hayes, Josh Jenkins, Shane Stevens; "Knowing You" – Adam James, Brett James, Kat Higgins |
| 2021 | "The Bones" – Jimmy Robbins, Maren Morris, Laura Veltz | "Bluebird" – Luke Dick, Miranda Lambert, Natalie Hemby; "One Night Standards" – Ashley McBryde, Nicolette Hayford, Shane McAnally; "Some People Do" – Jesse Frasure, Matt Ramsey, Thomas Rhett, Shane McAnally; "Starting Over" – Chris Stapleton, Mike Henderson |
| 2020 | "One Man Band" – Josh Osborne, Matthew Ramsey, Trevor Rosen, Brad Tursi | "10,000 Hours" – Dan Smyers, Shay Mooney, Justin Bieber, Jessie Jo Dillon, Jason Boyd, Jordan Reynolds; "Girl Goin' Nowhere" – Ashley McBryde, Jeremy Bussey; "God's Country" – Devin Dawson, Jordan Schmidt, Michael Hardy; "Some of It" – Eric Church, Jeff Hyde, Clint Daniels, Bobby Pinson |

=== 2010s ===
| Year | Winner | Nominees |
|---|---|---|
| 2019 | "Tequila" — Nicolle Galyon, Jordan Reynolds, Dan Smyers | "Break Up in the End" — Jessie Jo Dillon, Chase McGill, Jon Nite; "Broken Halos" — Mike Henderson, Chris Stapleton; "Meant to Be" — David Garcia, Tyler Hubbard, Joshua Miller, Bebe Rexha; "Space Cowboy" — Luke Laird, Shane McAnally, Kacey Musgraves; "Yours" — Casey Brown, Russell Dickerson, Parker Welling |
| 2018 | "Tin Man" — Jack Ingram, Miranda Lambert and Jon Randall | "Better Man" — Taylor Swift; "Body Like a Back Road" — Zach Crowell, Sam Hunt, Shane McAnally and Josh Osborne; "Female" — Ross Copperman, Nicolle Galyon and Shane McAnally; "Whiskey and You" — Lee Thomas Miller and Chris Stapleton |
| 2017 | "Die a Happy Man" – Thomas Rhett, Sean Douglas, Joe Spargur | "Blue Ain’t Your Color" – Clint Lagerberg, Hillary Lindsey, Steven Lee Olsen; "Humble and Kind" – Lori McKenna; "Kill a Word" – Eric Church, Luke Dick, Jeff Hyde; "Tennessee Whiskey" – Dean Dillon, Linda Hargrove; "Vice" – Miranda Lambert, Shane McAnally, Josh Osborne |
| 2016 | "Nobody to Blame – Barry Bales, Ronnie Bowman, Chris Stapleton | "Girl Crush" – Hillary Lindsey, Lori McKenna, Liz Rose; "Burning House" – Jeff Bhasker, Cam, Tyler Johnson; "Raise 'Em Up" – Tom Douglas, Jaren Johnston, Jeffrey Steele; "She Don't Love You" – Eric Paslay & Jennifer Wayne |
| 2015 | "Automatic" — Nicolle Galyon, Natalie Hemby, Miranda Lambert | "American Kids" — Rodney Clawson, Luke Laird, Shane McAnally; "Drink A Beer" — Jim Beavers, Chris Stapleton; "Follow Your Arrow" — Brandy Clark, Shane McAnally, Kacey Musgraves; "Give Me Back My Hometown" — Eric Church, Luke Laird; "I Hold On" — Brett James, Dierks Bentley |
| 2014 | "I Drive Your Truck" — Jessi Alexander, Connie Harrington, Jimmy Yeary | "Every Storm (Runs Out of Rain)" — Gary Allan, Hillary Lindsey, Matthew Warren; "Mama's Broken Heart" — Brandy Clark, Shane McAnally, Kacey Musgraves; "Mine Would Be You" — Jessi Alexander, Connie Harrington, Deric Ruttan; "Wagon Wheel" — Bob Dylan, Ketch Secor |
| 2013 | "Over You" — Miranda Lambert, Blake Shelton | "A Woman Like You" — Phil Barton, Johnny Bulford, Jon Stone; "Even If It Breaks Your Heart" — Will Hoge, Eric Paslay; "Springsteen" — Eric Church, Jeff Hyde, Ryan Tyndell; "Wanted" — Hunter Hayes, Troy Verges |
| 2012 | "Crazy Girl" – Lee Brice and Liz Rose | "Home" – Brett Beavers, Dierks Bentley and Dan Wilson; "Just a Kiss" – Dallas Davidson, Dave Haywood, Charles Kelley and Hillary Scott; "Threaten Me With Heaven" – Amy Grant, Vince Gill, Dillon O'Brian and Will Owsley; "You and Tequila" – Matraca Berg and Deana Carter |
| 2011 | "The House That Built Me" – Tom Douglas and Allen Shamblin | "A Little More Country Than That" – Rory Lee Feek, Don Poythress and Wynn Varble; "As She’s Walking Away" – Zac Brown and Wyatt Durrette; "If I Die Young" – Kimberly Perry; "Love Like Crazy" – Tim James and Doug Johnson |
| 2010 | "Need You Now" – Dave Haywood, Josh Kear, Charles Kelley, Hillary Scott | "Cowboy Casanova" – Mike Elizondo, Brett James, Carrie Underwood; "People Are Crazy" – Bobby Braddock, Troy Jones; "White Liar" – Natalie Hemby, Miranda Lambert; "You Belong With Me" – Liz Rose, Taylor Swift |

=== 2000s ===
| Year | Winner | Nominees |
|---|---|---|
| 2009 | “In Color” — Jamey Johnson, Lee Thomas Miller, James Otto | “I Saw God Today” — Rodney Clawson, Monty Criswell, Wade Kirby; “Johnny & June” — Deanna Bryant, Heidi Newfield, Stephony Smith; “Waitin' On A Woman” — Don Sampson, Wynn Varble; “You're Gonna Miss This” — Ashley Gorley and Lee Thomas Miller |
| 2008 | “Stay” — Jennifer Nettles | “Don’t Blink” — Casey Beathard, Chris Wallin; “Lost in This Moment” — Keith Anderson, Rodney Clawson, John Rich; “Moments” — Dave Berg, Annie Tate, Sam Tate; “Watching You” — Rodney Atkins, Steve Dean, Brian White |
| 2007 | “Give It Away” — Bill Anderson, Buddy Cannon, Jamey Johnson | “Amarillo Sky” — John Rich, Big Kenny, Rodney Clawson, Bart Pursley; “Before He Cheats” — Chris Tompkins, Josh Kear; “If You’re Going Through Hell (Before the Devil Even Knows)” — Sam Tate, Annie Tate, Dave Berg; “Would You Go With Me” — Shawn Camp, John Scott Sherrill |
| 2006 | “Believe” — Ronnie Dunn and Craig Wiseman | “Baby Girl” — Kristian Bush, Kristen Hall, Jennifer Nettles and Troy Bieser; “Jesus, Take the Wheel” — Hillary Lindsey, Gordie Sampson and Brett James; “Skin (Sarabeth)” — Doug Johnson and Joe Henry; “When I Get Where I’m Going” — George Teren and Rivers Rutherford |
| 2005 | "Live Like You Were Dying" — Craig Wiseman and Tim Nichols | "American Soldier" — Toby Keith and Chuck Cannon; "Bless The Broken Road" — Marcus Hummon, Bobby Boyd and Jeff Hanna; "I May Hate Myself In The Morning" — Odie Blackmon; "Whiskey Lullaby" — Bill Anderson and Jon Randall |
| 2004 | "Three Wooden Crosses" — Doug Johnson, Kim Williams | "It's Five O'Clock Somewhere" — Jim Brown, Donald Rollins; "Red Dirt Road" — Kix Brooks and Ronnie Dunn (Brooks & Dunn); "Remember When" — Alan Jackson; "There Goes My Life" — Wendell Mobley and Neil Thrasher |
| 2003 | "I'm Movin' On" — Phillip Brian White and David Vincent Williams | "A Lot of Things Different" — Bill Anderson and Dean Dillon; "Courtesy of the Red, White, and Blue (The Angry American)" — Toby Keith; "Drive (For Daddy Gene)" — Alan Jackson; "Forgive" — Rebecca Lynn Howard and Trey Bruce |
| 2002 | "Where Were You (When The World Stopped Turning)" — Alan Jackson | "Angels in Waiting" — Tammy Cochran, Stewart Harris and Jim McBride; "I Wanna Talk About Me" — Bobby Braddock; "One More Day" — Bobby Tomberlin and Steven Dale Jones; "Only in America" — Kix Brooks, Don Cook and Ronnie Rogers |
| 2001 | "I Hope You Dance" — Mark D. Sanders and Tia Sillers | "How Do You Like Me Now?!" — Toby Keith and Chuck Cannon; "The Little Girl" — Harley Allen; "One Voice" — Don Cook and David Malloy; "We Danced" — Brad Paisley and Chris DuBois |
| 2000 | "Amazed" — Aimee Mayo, Chris Lindsey, Marv Green | "Breathe" — Stephanie Bentley, Holly Lamar; "Choices" — Billy Yates, Mike Curtis; "He Didn't Have to Be" — Brad Paisley, Kelley Lovelace; "Please Remember Me" — Rodney Crowell, Will Jennings |

=== 1990s ===
| Year | Winner | Nominees |
|---|---|---|
| 1999 | "Holes in the Floor of Heaven" — Billy Kirsch, Steve Wariner | "A Broken Wing" — James House, Sam Hogin, Phil Barnhart; "Don't Laugh at Me" — Steve Seskin, Allen Shamblin; "Husbands and Wives" — Roger Miller; "This Kiss" — Beth Nielsen Chapman, Robin Lerner, Annie Roboff |
| 1998 | "It's Your Love" — Stephony Smith | "All the Good Ones Are Gone" — Dean Dillon, Bob McDill; "How Do I Live" — Diane Warren; "Something That We Do" — Clint Black, Skip Ewing; "The Fool" — Charley Stefl, Gene Ellsworth, Marla Cannon |
| 1997 | "Blue" — Bill Mack | "Carried Away" — Jeff Stevens, Steve Bogard; "My Maria" — B.W. Stevenson, Daniel Moore; "Strawberry Wine" — Matraca Berg, Gary Harrison; "Time Marches On" — Bobby Braddock |
| 1996 | "The Keeper of the Stars" — Dickey Lee, Karen Staley, Danny Mayo | "I Like It, I Love It" — Jeb Stuart Anderson, Mark Hall, Steve Dukes; "Standing on the Edge of Goodbye" — John Berry, Stewart Harris; "You Don't Even Know Who I Am" — Gretchen Peters; "You're Gonna Miss Me When I'm Gone" — Don Cook, Kix Brooks, Ronnie Dunn |
| 1995 | "I Swear" — Frank J. Myers, Gary Baker | "Don't Take the Girl" — Craig Martin, Larry W. Johnson; "How Can I Help You Say Goodbye" — Karen Taylor-Good, Burton Banks Collins; "Livin' on Love" — Alan Jackson; "When Love Finds You" — Vince Gill, Michael Omartian |
| 1994 | "I Love the Way You Love Me" — Chuck Cannon, Victoria Shaw | "Can I Trust You with My Heart" — Travis Tritt, Stewart Harris; "Chattahoochee" — Alan Jackson, Jim McBride; "Does He Love You" — Billy Stritch, Sandy Knox; "I Don't Call Him Daddy" — Reed Nielsen |
| 1993 | "I Still Believe in You" — Vince Gill, John Barlow Jarvis | "Boot Scootin' Boogie" — Ronnie Dunn; "I Feel Lucky" — Mary Chapin Carpenter, Don Schlitz; "Something in Red" — Angela Kaset; "Two Sparrows in a Hurricane" — Mark Alan Springer |
| 1992 | "Somewhere in My Broken Heart" — Billy Dean, Richard Leigh | "Don't Rock the Jukebox" — Alan Jackson, Roger Murrah, Keith Stegall; "Down at the Twist and Shout" — Mary Chapin Carpenter; "Here's a Quarter (Call Someone Who Cares)" — Travis Tritt; "Pocket Full of Gold" — Vince Gill, Brian Allsmiller |
| 1991 | "The Dance" — Tony Arata | "Friends in Low Places" — Dewayne Blackwell, Earl Bud Lee; "Here in the Real World" — Alan Jackson, Mark Irwin; "Jukebox in My Mind" — Dave Gibson, Ronnie Rogers; "When I Call Your Name" — Vince Gill, Tim DuBois |
| 1990 | "Where've You Been" — Jon Vezner,Don Henry | "After All This Time" — Rodney Crowell; "If Tomorrow Never Comes" — Garth Brooks, Kent Blazy; "Killin' Time" — Clint Black, Hayden Nicholas; "There's a Tear in My Beer" — Hank Williams |

=== 1980s ===
| Year | Winner | Nominees |
|---|---|---|
| 1989 | "Eighteen Wheels and a Dozen Roses" — Gene Nelson, Paul Nelson | "Don't Close Your Eyes" — Bob McDill; "I Know How He Feels" — Rick Bowles, Will Robinson; "Set 'Em Up Joe" — Dean Dillon, Hank Cochran, Buddy Cannon, Vern Gosdin; "Strong Enough to Bend" — Beth Nielsen Chapman, Don Schlitz |
| 1988 | "Forever and Ever, Amen" — Paul Overstreet, Don Schlitz | "80's Ladies" — K.T. Oslin; "Born to Boogie" — Hank Williams Jr.; "Ocean Front Property" — Dean Dillon, Hank Cochran, Royce Porter; "Somebody Lied" — Larry Jenkins, Joe Chambers |
| 1987 | "On the Other Hand" — Paul Overstreet, Don Schlitz | "Everything That Glitters (Is Not Gold)" — Bob McDill, Dan Seals; "Grandpa (Tell Me 'Bout the Good Old Days)" — Jamie O'Hara; "Living in the Promiseland" — David Lynn Jones; "Whoever's in New England" — Kendal Franceschi, Quentin Powers |
| 1986 | "Lost in the Fifties Tonight (In the Still of the Night)" — Fred Parris, Mike Reid, Troy Seals | "Baby's Got Her Blue Jeans On" — Bob McDill; "I'll Never Stop Loving You" — Dave Loggins, J.D. Martin; "Seven Spanish Angels" — Troy Seals, Eddie Sester; "Some Fools Never Learn" — John Scott Sherrill |
| 1985 | "Why Not Me" — Harlan Howard, Brent Maher, Sonny Throckmorton | "I've Been Around Enough to Know" — Bob McDill, Dickey Lee; "Second Hand Heart" — Mark Gray, Harold Tipton, Craig Karp; "To All the Girls I've Loved Before" — Albert Hammond, Hal David; "When We Make Love" — Troy Seals, Mentor Williams |
| 1984 | "Wind Beneath My Wings" — Larry Henley, Jeff Silbar | "I Always Get Lucky with You" — Merle Haggard, Freddy Powers, Gary Church, Tex Whitson; "I.O.U." — Austin Roberts, Kerry Chater; "Lady Down on Love" — Randy Owen; "Swingin'" — John Anderson, Lionel Delmore |
| 1983 | "Are the Good Times Really Over (I Wish a Buck Was Still Silver)" — Merle Haggard | "I'm Gonna Hire a Wino to Decorate Our Home" — Dewayne Blackwell; "Nobody" — Kye Fleming, Dennis Morgan; "Ring on Her Finger, Time on Her Hands" — Pam Rose, Mary Ann Kennedy, Don Goodman; "She Got the Goldmine" — Tim DuBois |
| 1982 | "You're the Reason God Made Oklahoma" — Felice Bryant, Boudleaux Bryant, Sandy Pinkard, Larry Collins | "Feels So Right" — Randy Owen; "It Turns Me Inside Out" — Jan Crutchfield; "Love in the First Degree" — Tim DuBois, Jim Hurt; "My Favorite Memory" — Merle Haggard |
| 1981 | "He Stopped Loving Her Today" — Curly Putman, Bobby Braddock | "9 to 5" — Dolly Parton; "I Believe in You" — Roger Cook, Sam Hogin; "Lady" — Lionel Richie; "Lookin' for Love" — Bob Morrison, Wanda Mallette, Patti Ryan |
| 1980 | "It's a Cheating Situation" — Curly Putman, Sonny Throckmorton | "All the Gold in California" — Larry Gatlin; "Last Cheater's Waltz" — Sonny Throckmorton; "She Believes in Me" — Steve Gibb; "You're the Only One" — Carole Bayer Sager, Bruce Roberts |

=== 1970s ===
| Year | Winner | Nominees |
|---|---|---|
| 1979 | "You Needed Me" — Randy Goodrum | "Burgers and Fries" — Ben Peters; "I'm Always on a Mountain When I Fall" — Chuck Howard; "Mammas Don't Let Your Babies Grow Up to Be Cowboys" — Ed Bruce, Patsy Bruce; "The Gambler" — Don Schlitz |
| 1978 | "Lucille" — Roger Bowling, Hal Bynum | "Don't It Make My Brown Eyes Blue" — Richard Leigh; "From Graceland to the Promised Land" — Merle Haggard; "Luckenbach, Texas (Back to the Basics of Love)" — Bobby Emmons, Chips Moman; "You Light Up My Life" — Joseph Brooks |
| 1977 | "Don't the Girls All Get Prettier at Closing Time" — Baker Knight | "Bring It On Home to Me" — Sam Cooke; "El Paso City" — Marty Robbins; "Somebody Somewhere (Don't Know What He's Missin' Tonight)" — Lola Jean Dillon; "Teddy Bear" — Billy Joe Burnette, Tommy Hill, Dale Royal, Red Sovine |
| 1976 | "Rhinestone Cowboy" — Larry Weiss | "Before the Next Teardrop Falls" — Vivian Keith, Ben Peters; "Blue Eyes Crying in the Rain" — Fred Rose; "I'm Not Lisa" — Jessi Colter; "When the Tingle Becomes a Chill" — Lola Jean Dillon |
| 1975 | "Country Bumpkin" — Don Wayne | "Back Home Again" — John Denver; "I Can Help" — Billy Swan; "One Day at a Time" — Kris Kristofferson, Marijohn Wilkin; "Things Aren't Funny Anymore" — Merle Haggard |
| 1974 | "Behind Closed Doors" — Kenny O'Dell | "If We Make It Through December" — Merle Haggard; "The Most Beautiful Girl" — Rory Bourke, Billy Sherrill, Norro Wilson; "(Old Dogs, Children and) Watermelon Wine" — Tom T. Hall; "Why Me" — Kris Kristofferson |
| 1973 | "The Happiest Girl In the Whole USA" — Donna Fargo | "Bless Your Heart" — Freddie Hart, Jack Lebsock; "Funny Face" — Donna Fargo; "It's Four in the Morning" — Jerry Chesnut; "To Get To You" — Jean Chapel |
| 1972 | "Easy Loving" — Freddie Hart | "Carolyn" — Tommy Collins; "Kiss an Angel Good Mornin'" — Ben Peters; "Lead Me On" — Leon Copeland; "Lovin' Her Was Easier (Than Anything I'll Ever Do Again)" — Kris Kristofferson |
| 1971 | "For the Good Times" — Kris Kristofferson | "The Fightin' Side of Me" — Merle Haggard; "Help Me Make It Through the Night" — Kris Kristofferson; "Rose Garden" — Joe South; "Sunday Mornin' Comin' Down" — Kris Kristofferson |
