= Academy of Country Music Awards =

American country music award

- Current: 61st Academy of Country Music Awards
- Official logo for the awards
- Awarded for: Achievements in country music
- Location: Variable U.S. locations
- Country: United States
- Presented by: Academy of Country Music
- First award: April 1966; 60 years ago
- Website: www.acmcountry.com

Television/radio coverage
- Network: ABC (1972–1978); NBC (1979–1997); CBS (1998–2021); Prime Video (2022–)
- Produced by: Dick Clark Productions

The Academy of Country Music Awards, also known as the ACM Awards, were first held in 1966, honoring the industry's accomplishments during the previous year. It was the first country music awards program held by a major organization. The academy's signature "hat" trophy was created in 1968. The awards were first televised in 1972 on ABC. In 1979, the academy joined with Dick Clark Productions to produce the show. Dick Clark and Al Schwartz served as producers while Gene Weed served as director. Under their guidance, the show moved to NBC in 1979, then to CBS in 1998, and Amazon Prime Video in 2022.

The academy adopted a sleeker, modern version of the "hat" trophy in 2003, which is made by the New York City firm Society Awards. In 2004, the organization implemented online awards voting for its professional members, becoming the first televised awards show to do so. Entertainer of the Year was a fan-voted award for eight years, until 2016, when the ACM announced its decision to abandon Internet-voting for it and the three new-artist categories.

The 62nd ACM Awards will remain at the MGM Grand Garden Arena in Las Vegas, Nevada in 2027.

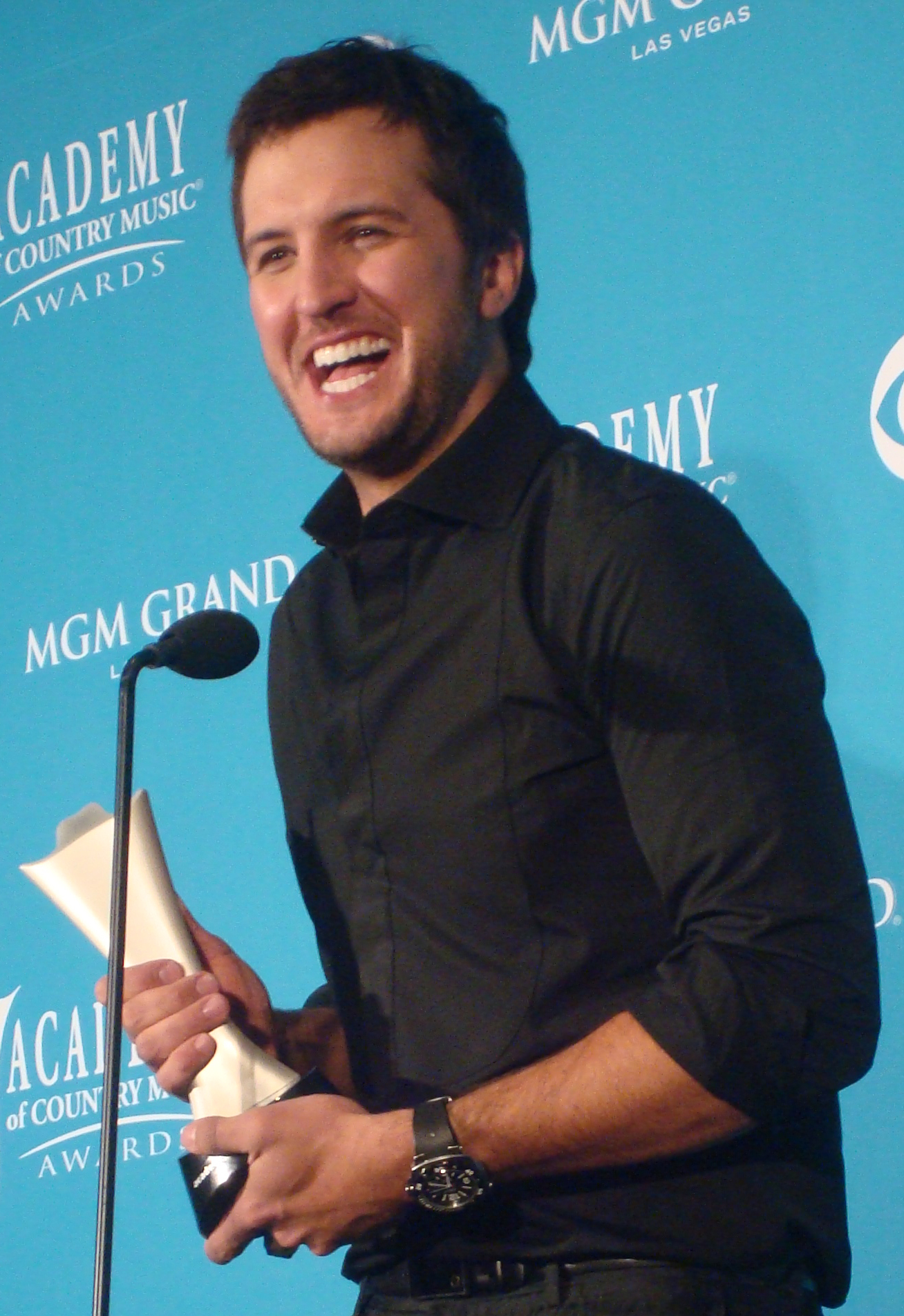
Luke Bryan holding the iconic ACM cowboy hat shaped trophy

== Voting process ==
Voting members of the Academy of Country Music (ACM) elect the nominees. In 2016, after an eight-year experiment intended to improve consumer engagement, the ACM announced its decision to abandon fan-voting for Entertainer of the Year and its three new-artist categories, thanks to the cost of participation and several rifts that had developed among artists. The program was controversial from the start and included the web ballot stuffing encouragement infamous among awards of the same type presented in other ceremonies. Kenny Chesney, after winning the first fan vote for entertainer in 2008, criticized the process backstage, complaining that instead of acknowledging artists' hard work, the vote had devolved into a marketing contest that rewarded people for "seeing how hard you can push people's buttons on the Internet." The winner, for example, of entertainer will now be voted on by the same people who select the male or female vocalist winner.

== Broadcasting ==
The ACM Awards were previously broadcast by ABC from 1972 to 1978, NBC from 1979 to 1997, and CBS from 1998 to 2021. In June 2021, it was reported that CBS would not renew its contract to air the ceremony, citing declining viewership and demands from Dick Clark Productions for a higher rights fee. CBS' parent company ViacomCBS decided to prioritize its own CMT Music Awards (produced by its cable network CMT) as a competitor, announcing later that month that it would move to CBS and be held in April beginning 2022.

After reports that the ACMs were being shopped to other networks such as NBC, it was announced on August 19, 2021, that the media rights to the ceremony had been acquired by Amazon Prime Video, making it one of the first major awards ceremonies on U.S. television to move exclusively to a streaming platform. The ceremony is streamed via Prime Video, and simulcast on Amazon Live, Amazon Music, and the Amazon Music channel on Twitch. In November 2023, Amazon renewed its rights through the 60th ceremony in 2025, and then again through 2028.

== Awards ==
The most prestigious awards are for "Artist of the Decade" and "Entertainer of the Year." There are a number of other awards to recognize male and female vocalists, albums, videos, songs, and musicians. The awards are typically presented in April or May and recognize achievement for the previous year.

=== Major awards ===
Year	Entertainer of the Year	Male Artist of the Year	Female Artist of the Year	Album of the Year	Song of the Year	New Male Artist of the Year	New Female Artist of the Year
2026	Cody Johnson	Cody Johnson	Ella Langley	Parker McCollum — Parker McCollum	Ella Langley, Luke Dick, Miranda Lambert, Joybeth Taylor — "Choosin' Texas"	Tucker Wetmore	Avery Anna
2025	Lainey Wilson	Chris Stapleton	Lainey Wilson	Whirlwind — Lainey Wilson	Josh Phillips — "Dirt Cheap"	Zach Top	Ella Langley
2024	Lainey Wilson	Chris Stapleton	Lainey Wilson	Higher — Chris Stapleton	Jordan Davis, Chase McGill, Greylan James, Josh Osborne — "Next Thing You Know"	Nate Smith	Megan Moroney
2023	Chris Stapleton	Morgan Wallen	Lainey Wilson	Bell Bottom Country — Lainey Wilson	Cole Swindell, Ashley Gorley, Jesse Frasure, Thomas Rhett, Mark D. Sanders, Tim Nichols — "She Had Me at Heads Carolina"	Zach Bryan	Hailey Whitters
2022	Miranda Lambert	Chris Stapleton	Carly Pearce	Dangerous: The Double Album — Morgan Wallen	Jason Nix, Jonathan Singleton, Lainey Wilson — "Things a Man Oughta Know"	Parker McCollum	Lainey Wilson
2021	Luke Bryan	Thomas Rhett	Maren Morris	Starting Over — Chris Stapleton	Maren Morris, Jimmy Robbins, Laura Veltz — "The Bones"	Jimmie Allen	Gabby Barrett
2020	Thomas Rhett (tie); Carrie Underwood (tie)	Luke Combs	Maren Morris	What You See Is What You Get — Luke Combs	Josh Osborne, Matthew Ramsey, Trevor Rosen, Brad Tursi — "One Man Band"	Riley Green	Tenille Townes
2019	Keith Urban	Thomas Rhett	Kacey Musgraves	Golden Hour — Kacey Musgraves	Nicolle Galyon, Jordan Reynolds, Dan Smyers — "Tequila"	Luke Combs	Ashley McBryde
2018	Jason Aldean	Chris Stapleton	Miranda Lambert	From A Room: Volume 1 — Chris Stapleton	Jack Ingram, Miranda Lambert, Jon Randall — "Tin Man"	Brett Young	Lauren Alaina
2017	Jason Aldean	Thomas Rhett	Miranda Lambert	The Weight of These Wings — Miranda Lambert	Sean Douglas, Thomas Rhett, Joe Spargur — "Die a Happy Man"	Jon Pardi	Maren Morris
2016	Jason Aldean	Chris Stapleton	Miranda Lambert	Traveller — Chris Stapleton	Barry Bales, Ronnie Bowman, Chris Stapleton — "Nobody to Blame"	Chris Stapleton	Kelsea Ballerini
2015	Luke Bryan (Note: From 2008 to 2015, 'Entertainer of the Year' was decided by a combination of ACM professional membership and fan votes cast online and via text message.)	Jason Aldean	Miranda Lambert	Platinum — Miranda Lambert	Miranda Lambert, Natalie Hemby, Nicolle Galyon — "Automatic"	Not awarded	Not awarded
2014	George Strait	Jason Aldean	Miranda Lambert	Same Trailer Different Park — Kacey Musgraves	Jessi Alexander, Connie Harrington, Jimmy Yeary — "I Drive Your Truck"	Justin Moore	Not awarded
2013	Luke Bryan	Jason Aldean	Miranda Lambert	Chief — Eric Church	Miranda Lambert, Blake Shelton — "Over You"	Brantley Gilbert	Jana Kramer
2012	Taylor Swift	Blake Shelton	Miranda Lambert	Four the Record — Miranda Lambert	Lee Brice, Liz Rose — "Crazy Girl"	Scotty McCreery	Not awarded
2011	Taylor Swift	Brad Paisley	Miranda Lambert	Need You Now — Lady Antebellum	Tom Douglas, Allen Shamblin — "The House That Built Me"	Not awarded	Not awarded
2010	Carrie Underwood	Brad Paisley	Miranda Lambert	Revolution — Miranda Lambert	Dave Haywood, Josh Kear, Charles Kelley, Hillary Scott — "Need You Now"	Luke Bryan	Not awarded
2009	Carrie Underwood	Brad Paisley	Carrie Underwood	Fearless — Taylor Swift	Jamey Johnson, Lee Thomas Miller, James Otto — "In Color"	Jake Owen	Julianne Hough
2008	Kenny Chesney	Brad Paisley	Carrie Underwood	Crazy Ex-Girlfriend — Miranda Lambert	Jennifer Nettles — "Stay"	Jack Ingram	Taylor Swift
2007	Kenny Chesney	Brad Paisley	Carrie Underwood	Some Hearts — Carrie Underwood	Bill Anderson, Buddy Cannon, Jamey Johnson — "Give It Away"	Rodney Atkins	Miranda Lambert
2006	Kenny Chesney	Keith Urban	Sara Evans	Time Well Wasted — Brad Paisley	Craig Wiseman, Ronnie Dunn — "Believe"	Jason Aldean	Carrie Underwood
2005	Kenny Chesney	Keith Urban	Gretchen Wilson	Be Here — Keith Urban	Craig Wiseman, Tim Nichols — "Live Like You Were Dying"	Not awarded	Gretchen Wilson
2004	Toby Keith	Toby Keith	Martina McBride	Shock'n Y'all — Toby Keith	Doug Johnson, Kim Williams — "Three Wooden Crosses"	Dierks Bentley	Not awarded
2003	Toby Keith	Kenny Chesney	Martina McBride	Drive — Alan Jackson	Phillip Brian White, David Vincent Williams — "I'm Movin' On"	Joe Nichols	Kellie Coffey
2002	Brooks & Dunn	Alan Jackson	Martina McBride	O Brother, Where Art Thou? — Various Artists	Alan Jackson — "Where Were You (When the World Stopped Turning)"	Phil Vassar	Carolyn Dawn Johnson
2001	Dixie Chicks	Toby Keith	Faith Hill	How Do You Like Me Now?! — Toby Keith	Mark D. Sanders, Tia Sillers — "I Hope You Dance"	Keith Urban	Jamie O'Neal
2000	Shania Twain	Tim McGraw	Faith Hill	Fly — Dixie Chicks	Marv Green, Aimee Mayo — "Amazed"	Brad Paisley	Jessica Andrews
1999	Garth Brooks	Tim McGraw	Faith Hill	Wide Open Spaces — Dixie Chicks	Steve Wariner, Billy Kirsch — "Holes in the Floor of Heaven"	Mark Wills	Jo Dee Messina
1998	Garth Brooks	George Strait	Trisha Yearwood	Carrying Your Love with Me — George Strait	Stephony Smith — "It's Your Love"	Kenny Chesney	Lee Ann Womack
1997	Brooks & Dunn	George Strait	Patty Loveless	Blue Clear Sky — George Strait	Bill Mack — "Blue"	Trace Adkins	LeAnn Rimes
1996	Brooks & Dunn	Alan Jackson	Patty Loveless	The Woman in Me — Shania Twain	Dickey Lee, Karen Staley, Danny Mayo — "The Keeper of the Stars"	Bryan White	Shania Twain
1995	Reba McEntire	Alan Jackson	Reba McEntire	Not a Moment Too Soon — Tim McGraw	Gary Baker, Frank J. Myers — "I Swear"	Tim McGraw	Chely Wright
1994	Garth Brooks	Vince Gill	Wynonna Judd	A Lot About Livin' (And a Little 'bout Love) — Alan Jackson	Victoria Shaw, Chuck Cannon — "I Love the Way You Love Me"	John Michael Montgomery	Faith Hill
1993	Garth Brooks	Vince Gill	Mary Chapin Carpenter	Brand New Man — Brooks & Dunn	Vince Gill, John Barlow Jarvis — "I Still Believe in You"	Tracy Lawrence	Michelle Wright
1992	Garth Brooks	Garth Brooks	Reba McEntire	Don't Rock the Jukebox — Alan Jackson	Billy Dean, Richard Leigh — "Somewhere in My Broken Heart"	Billy Dean	Trisha Yearwood
1991	Garth Brooks	Garth Brooks	Reba McEntire	No Fences — Garth Brooks	Tony Arata — "The Dance"	Alan Jackson	Shelby Lynne
1990	George Strait	Clint Black	Kathy Mattea	Killin' Time — Clint Black	Jon Vezner, Don Henry — "Where've You Been"	Clint Black	Mary Chapin Carpenter
1989	Hank Williams, Jr.	George Strait	K. T. Oslin	This Woman — K.T. Oslin	Charles Gene Nelson, Paul Nelson — "Eighteen Wheels and a Dozen Roses"	Rodney Crowell	Suzy Bogguss
1988	Hank Williams, Jr.	Randy Travis	Reba McEntire	Trio — Dolly Parton, Emmylou Harris and Linda Ronstadt	Paul Overstreet, Don Schlitz — "Forever and Ever, Amen"	Ricky Van Shelton	K.T. Oslin
1987	Hank Williams, Jr.	Randy Travis	Reba McEntire	Storms of Life — Randy Travis	Paul Overstreet, Don Schlitz — "On the Other Hand"	Dwight Yoakam	Holly Dunn
1986	Alabama	George Strait	Reba McEntire	Does Fort Worth Ever Cross Your Mind — George Strait	Fred Parris, Mike Reid, Troy Seals — "Lost in the Fifties Tonight"	Randy Travis	Judy Rodman
1985	Alabama	George Strait	Reba McEntire	Roll On — Alabama	Harlan Howard, Brent Maher, Sonny Throckmorton — "Why Not Me"	Vince Gill	Nicolette Larson
1984	Alabama	Lee Greenwood	Janie Fricke	The Closer You Get... — Alabama	Larry Henley, Jeff Silbar — "Wind Beneath My Wings"	Jim Glaser	Gus Hardin
1983	Alabama	Ronnie Milsap	Sylvia	Always on My Mind — Willie Nelson	Merle Haggard — "Are the Good Times Really Over (I Wish a Buck Was Still Silver)"	Michael Martin Murphy	Karen Brooks
1982	Alabama	Merle Haggard	Barbara Mandrell	Feels So Right — Alabama	Felice Bryant, Boudleaux Bryant, Larry Collins, Sandy Pinkard — "You're the Reason God Made Oklahoma"	Ricky Skaggs	Juice Newton
1981	Barbara Mandrell	George Jones	Dolly Parton	Urban Cowboy — Various Artists	Bobby Braddock, Curly Putman — "He Stopped Loving Her Today"	Johnny Lee	Terri Gibbs
1980	Willie Nelson	Larry Gatlin	Crystal Gayle	Straight Ahead — Larry Gatlin	Sonny Throckmorton, Curly Putman — "It's a Cheating Situation"	R.C. Bannon	Lacy J. Dalton
1979	Kenny Rogers	Kenny Rogers	Barbara Mandrell	Y'all Come Back Saloon — The Oak Ridge Boys	Randy Goodrum — "You Needed Me"	John Conlee	Cristy Lane
1978	Dolly Parton	Kenny Rogers	Crystal Gayle	Kenny Rogers — Kenny Rogers	Roger Bowling, Hal Bynum — "Lucille"	Eddie Rabbitt	Debby Boone
1977	Mickey Gilley	Mickey Gilley	Crystal Gayle	Gilley's Smoking — Mickey Gilley	Baker Knight — "Don't the Girls All Get Prettier at Closing Time"	Moe Bandy	Billie Jo Spears
1976	Loretta Lynn	Conway Twitty	Loretta Lynn	Feelins' — Conway Twitty and Loretta Lynn	Larry Weiss — "Rhinestone Cowboy"	Freddy Fender	Crystal Gayle
1975	Mac Davis	Merle Haggard	Loretta Lynn	Back Home Again — John Denver	Don Wayne — "Country Bumpkin"	Mickey Gilley	Linda Ronstadt
1974	Roy Clark	Charlie Rich	Loretta Lynn	Behind Closed Doors — Charlie Rich	Kenny O'Dell — "Behind Closed Doors"	Dorsey Burnette	Olivia Newton-John
1973	Roy Clark	Merle Haggard	Donna Fargo	The Happiest Girl in the Whole U.S.A. — Donna Fargo	Donna Fargo — "The Happiest Girl In the Whole USA"	Johnny Rodriguez	Tanya Tucker
1972	Freddie Hart	Freddie Hart	Loretta Lynn	Easy Loving — Freddie Hart	Freddie Hart — "Easy Loving"	Tony Booth	Barbara Mandrell
1971	Merle Haggard	Merle Haggard	Lynn Anderson	For the Good Times — Ray Price	Kris Kristofferson — "For the Good Times"	Buddy Alan	Sammi Smith
1970	Not awarded	Merle Haggard	Tammy Wynette	Okie from Muskogee — Merle Haggard	Merle Haggard, Eddie Buriss — "Okie from Muskogee"	Freddy Weller	Donna Fargo
1969	Not awarded	Glen Campbell	Cathie Taylor	Bobbie Gentry and Glen Campbell — Bobbie Gentry and Glen Campbell	Jimmy Webb — "Wichita Lineman"	Ray Sanders	Cheryl Poole
1968	Not awarded	Glen Campbell	Lynn Anderson	Gentle on My Mind — Glen Campbell	Dale Noe — "It's Such a Pretty World Today"	Jerry Inman	Bobbie Gentry
1967	Not awarded	Merle Haggard	Bonnie Guitar	Not awarded	Fern Foley, Charles "Fuzzy" Owen, Johnny Paycheck — "Apartment No. 9"	Billy Mize	Cathie Taylor
1966	Not awarded	Buck Owens	Bonnie Owens	Not awarded	Not awarded	Merle Haggard	Kay Adams

Notes

== Special awards ==
=== Artist of the Decade ===
- 2010s: Jason Aldean (presented 2019)
- 2000s: George Strait (presented 2009)
- 1990s: Garth Brooks (presented 1999)
- 1980s: Alabama (presented 1989)
- 1970s: Loretta Lynn (presented 1979)
- 1960s: Marty Robbins (presented 1969)

=== Triple-Crown Award ===
The Triple-Crown Award is an elite honor that has been presented to only eleven country acts in the history of the Academy of Country Music Awards. The honor distinguishes the achievement of an artist, duo or group upon receiving the New Artist (or New Male Vocalist, New Female Vocalist, New Solo Vocalist, New Vocal Duo, New Vocal Group or New Vocal Duo or Group), and Male/Female Artist (or Vocal Duo, Vocal Group, Vocal Duo or Group) and Entertainer of the Year awards. Among the later recipients, Carrie Underwood received it at the ACM Awards, while Jason Aldean, Miranda Lambert, Chris Stapleton, and Lainey Wilson received their awards at the Annual ACM Honors. The following list shows the artists that have won the award and the first year winning each of the categories required. The Chicks have reached the milestones needed to receive the award, but they have not yet been awarded.

- Kenny Chesney (presented 2005)

Top New Male Artist: 1998
Top Male Artist: 2003
Entertainer of the Year: 2005

- Merle Haggard (presented 2005)

Top New Male Artist: 1966
Top Male Artist: 1967
Entertainer of the Year: 1971

- Mickey Gilley (presented 2005)

Top New Male Artist: 1975
Top Male Artist: 1977
Entertainer of the Year: 1977

- Barbara Mandrell (presented 2005)

Top New Female Artist: 1972
Top Female Artist: 1979
Entertainer of the Year: 1981

- Brooks & Dunn (presented 2005)

Top New Vocal Duet or Group: 1992
Top Vocal Duet: 1992
Entertainer of the Year: 1996

- Carrie Underwood (presented 2010)

Top New Female Artist: 2006
Top Female Artist: 2007
Entertainer of the Year: 2009

- Jason Aldean (presented 2016)

Top New Male Artist: 2006
Top Male Artist: 2013
Entertainer of the Year: 2016

- Miranda Lambert (presented 2022)

Top New Female Artist: 2007
Top Female Artist: 2010
Entertainer of the Year: 2022

- Chris Stapleton (presented 2023)

Top New Male Artist 2015
Top Male Artist: 2015
Entertainer of the Year: 2023

- Lainey Wilson (presented 2024)

Top New Female Artist: 2022
Top Female Artist: 2023
Entertainer of the Year: 2024

- Keith Urban (presented 2025)

Top New Male Artist: 2001
Top Male Artist: 2005
Entertainer of the Year: 2019

=== Alan Jackson Lifetime Achievement Award ===
The Alan Jackson Lifetime Achievement Award was created in 2025.

- 2025, Alan Jackson

== Venues ==
The Academy of Country Music Awards were originally held at various locations in Greater Los Angeles through 2002. In 2003, the ceremony moved to Las Vegas, first at the Michelob Ultra Arena at Mandalay Bay through 2005 and later at the MGM Grand Garden Arena at the MGM Grand from 2006 to 2014. In 2015, the ACMs were held at AT&T Stadium in Arlington, Texas, in the Dallas—Fort Worth metroplex to celebrate its 50th anniversary. It broke the Guinness record that year for Most Attended Awards Show, with 70,252 attending.

The ceremony returned to the MGM Grand Garden Arena for 2016, then moved to T-Mobile Arena in Las Vegas for 2017. In 2018 and 2019, the show was again broadcast from the MGM Grand Garden Arena. In 2020 and 2021, the in-person ceremony in Las Vegas was not held due to the COVID-19 pandemic; the two ceremonies were held at various sites in Nashville, with the primary venues being the Grand Ole Opry House, Ryman Auditorium, and the Bluebird Café. The ACM confirmed a return to Las Vegas for 2022, with the ceremony held at Allegiant Stadium.

In 2023, the ceremony moved to Texas, having been hosted by the Ford Center at The Star in Frisco, in the Dallas—Fort Worth metroplex.

== See also ==
- Country Music Association
- Country Music Hall of Fame
- Grand Ole Opry
