= List of Hot Country Singles number ones of 1972 =

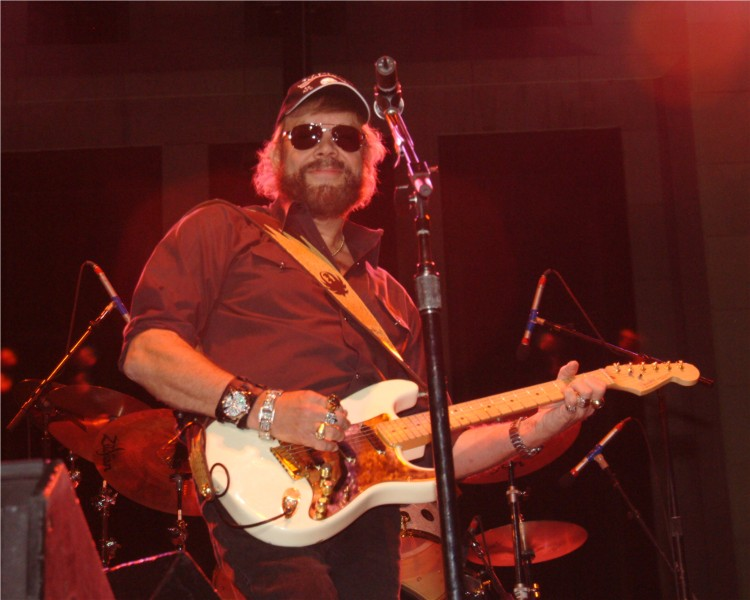
Hank Williams Jr. reached number one in 1972 with "Eleven Roses". At the time he did not sport the beard, dark glasses and hat which he adopted after suffering severe facial injuries in 1975.

Hot Country Songs is a chart that ranks the top-performing country music songs in the United States, published by Billboard magazine. In 1972, 27 different singles topped the chart, at the time published under the title Hot Country Singles, in 53 issues of the magazine, based on playlists submitted by country music radio stations and sales reports supplied by stores.

In the first issue of Billboard of the new year, "Kiss an Angel Good Mornin'" by Charley Pride spent its fifth week at number one. The following week, it was displaced by the double A-sided single "Would You Take Another Chance on Me" / "Me and Bobby McGee" by Jerry Lee Lewis. Freddie Hart spent the most weeks at number one in 1972, occupying the top spot for a total of 11 weeks with "My Hang-Up Is You", "Bless Your Heart" and "Got the All Overs for You (All Over Me)". "My Hang-Up Is You" had the longest unbroken run at number one, spending six weeks at the top of the chart in the spring. This was twice as long as any other song spent at number one during 1972. Hart had been a recording artist since the early 1950s and made his first appearance on the Hot Country chart in 1959, but had never reached the top 10 until 1971, when "Easy Loving" went to number one. That song began a run of top 10 entries which lasted until 1975, when his chart performance began to decline again. In addition to Hart, Merle Haggard and Pride each achieved three number ones in 1972, spending six and seven weeks respectively at the top of the chart.

Three artists topped the chart for the first time in 1972. Donna Fargo spent three weeks at number one in June with her first chart entry, "The Happiest Girl in the Whole U.S.A.", and went on to gain her second number one in the fall with "Funny Face". Jerry Wallace achieved his only country chart-topper with "If You Leave Me Tonight I'll Cry", which spent two non-consecutive weeks at number one after being featured in an episode of the television show Night Gallery. Finally, Mel Tillis topped the chart for the first time with "I Ain't Never", more than a decade after he had first charted in Billboard. Tillis co-wrote the song with Webb Pierce, whose version went to number two on the chart in 1959, but Tillis did not record the song himself until 1972, when his version outperformed Pierce's and became his first number one. The final number one of the year was "She's Got to Be a Saint" by another singer who had been charting since the 1950s, Ray Price.

== Chart history ==
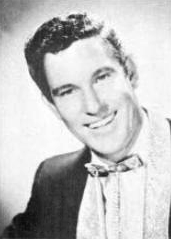
After more than a decade of chart appearances without ever reaching the top 10, Freddie Hart had reached number one for the first time in 1971 and continued his run of success in 1972.

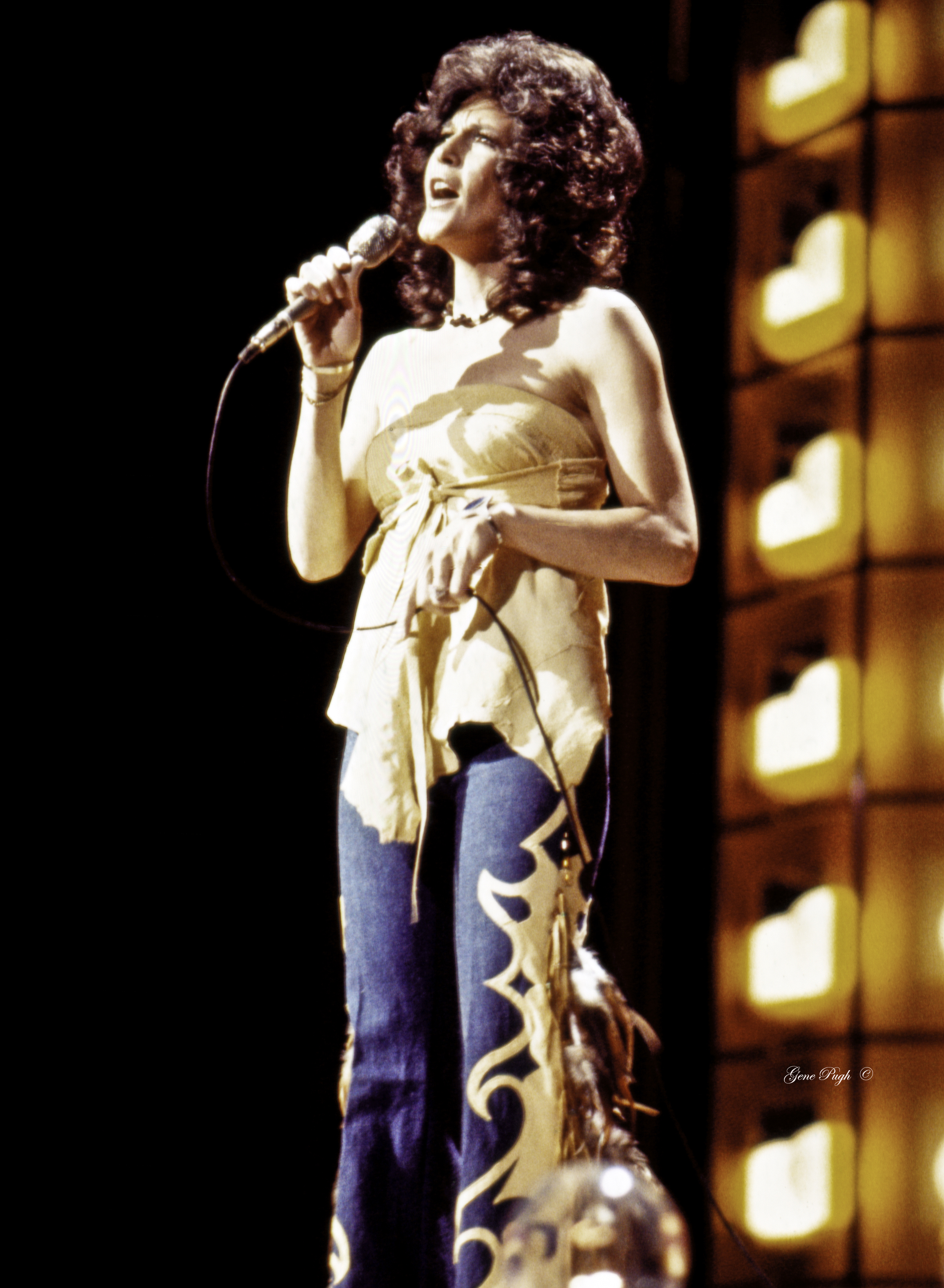
Donna Fargo began her chart career with a number one and quickly followed it up with a second.

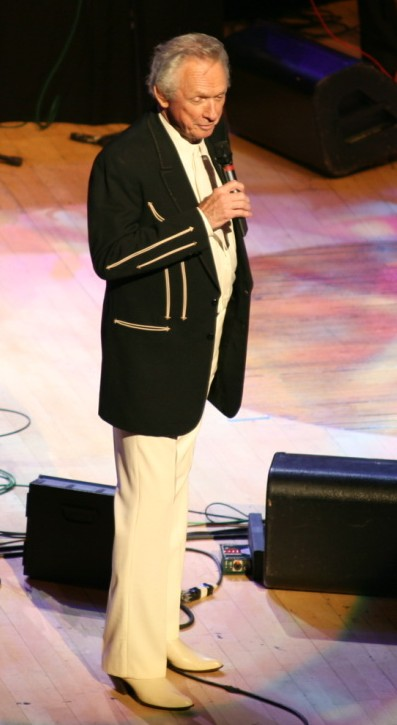
Mel Tillis achieved his first number one, more than a decade after he first entered the chart.

Issue date	Title	Artist	Ref.
January 1	"Kiss an Angel Good Mornin'"	Charley Pride	
January 8	"Would You Take Another Chance on Me" / "Me and Bobby McGee"^{[a]}	Jerry Lee Lewis	
January 15	"Carolyn"	Merle Haggard	
January 22	"Carolyn"	Merle Haggard	
January 29	"Carolyn"	Merle Haggard	
February 5	"One's on the Way"	Loretta Lynn	
February 12	"One's on the Way"	Loretta Lynn	
February 19	"It's Four in the Morning"	Faron Young	
February 26	"It's Four in the Morning"	Faron Young	
March 4	"Bedtime Story"	Tammy Wynette	
March 11	"My Hang-Up Is You"	Freddie Hart	
March 18	"My Hang-Up Is You"	Freddie Hart	
March 25	"My Hang-Up Is You"	Freddie Hart	
April 1	"My Hang-Up Is You"	Freddie Hart	
April 8	"My Hang-Up Is You"	Freddie Hart	
April 15	"My Hang-Up Is You"	Freddie Hart	
April 22	"Chantilly Lace" / "Think About It Darlin"	Jerry Lee Lewis	
April 29	"Chantilly Lace" / "Think About It Darlin"	Jerry Lee Lewis	
May 6	"Chantilly Lace" / "Think About It Darlin"	Jerry Lee Lewis	
May 13	"Grandma Harp"	Merle Haggard	
May 20	"Grandma Harp"	Merle Haggard	
May 27	"(Lost Her Love) On Our Last Date"	Conway Twitty	
June 3	"The Happiest Girl in the Whole U.S.A."	Donna Fargo	
June 10	"The Happiest Girl in the Whole U.S.A."	Donna Fargo	
June 17	"The Happiest Girl in the Whole U.S.A."	Donna Fargo	
June 24	"That's Why I Love You Like I Do"	Sonny James	
July 1	"Eleven Roses"	Hank Williams Jr.	
July 8	"Eleven Roses"	Hank Williams Jr.	
July 15	"Made in Japan"	Buck Owens	
July 22	"It's Gonna Take a Little Bit Longer"	Charley Pride	
July 29	"It's Gonna Take a Little Bit Longer"	Charley Pride	
August 5	"It's Gonna Take a Little Bit Longer"	Charley Pride	
August 12	"Bless Your Heart"	Freddie Hart	
August 19	"Bless Your Heart"	Freddie Hart	
August 26	"If You Leave Me Tonight I'll Cry"	Jerry Wallace	
September 2	"Woman (Sensuous Woman)"	Don Gibson	
September 9	"If You Leave Me Tonight I'll Cry"	Jerry Wallace	
September 16	"When the Snow Is on the Roses"	Sonny James	
September 23	"I Can't Stop Loving You"	Conway Twitty	
September 30	"I Ain't Never"	Mel Tillis	
October 7	"I Ain't Never"	Mel Tillis	
October 14	"Funny Face"	Donna Fargo	
October 21	"Funny Face"	Donna Fargo	
October 28	"Funny Face"	Donna Fargo	
November 4	"It's Not Love (But It's Not Bad)"	Merle Haggard	
November 11	"My Man (Understands)"	Tammy Wynette	
November 18	"She's Too Good to Be True"	Charley Pride	
November 25	"She's Too Good to Be True"	Charley Pride	
December 2	"She's Too Good to Be True"	Charley Pride	
December 9	"Got the All Overs for You (All Over Me)"	Freddie Hart	
December 16	"Got the All Overs for You (All Over Me)"	Freddie Hart	
December 23	"Got the All Overs for You (All Over Me)"	Freddie Hart	
December 30	"She's Got to Be a Saint"	Ray Price	

a. Double A-sided single

== See also ==
- 1972 in music
- List of artists who reached number one on the U.S. country chart
