= 1972 Country Music Association Awards =

Annual US music awards ceremony

- Date: October 16, 1972
- Location: Ryman Auditorium, Nashville, Tennessee
- Hosted by: Glen Campbell
- Most wins: Loretta Lynn (3)
- Most nominations: Loretta Lynn (5)

Television/radio coverage
- Network: CBS

The 1972 Country Music Association Awards, 6th Ceremony, was held on October 16, 1972, at the Ryman Auditorium, Nashville, Tennessee, and was hosted by CMA Award winner Glen Campbell. This was the first CMA ceremony to be broadcast by CBS.

== Winners and nominees ==
Winners in Bold.

Entertainer of the Year	Album of the Year
**Loretta Lynn**; Merle Haggard; Freddie Hart; Charley Pride; Jerry Reed	**Let Me Tell You About a Song — Merle Haggard**; Charley Pride Sings Heart Songs — Charley Pride; Coat of Many Colors — Dolly Parton; Lead Me On — Conway Twitty and Loretta Lynn; The Happiest Girl in the Whole U.S.A. — Donna Fargo
Male Vocalist of the Year	Female Vocalist of the Year
**Charley Pride**; Merle Haggard; Freddie Hart; Johnny Paycheck; Jerry Wallace	**Loretta Lynn**; Donna Fargo; Dolly Parton; Connie Smith; Tammy Wynette
Vocal Group of the Year	Vocal Duo of the Year
**Statler Brothers**; The Carter Family; The Osborne Brothers; Tompall & the Glaser Brothers; The Wilburn Brothers	**Conway Twitty and Loretta Lynn**; Jack Greene and Jeannie Seely; George Jones and Tammy Wynette; Johnny Paycheck and Jody Miller; Porter Wagoner and Dolly Parton
Single of the Year	Song of the Year
**"The Happiest Girl in the Whole U.S.A." — Donna Fargo**; "It's Four in the Morning" — Faron Young; "Kiss an Angel Good Mornin'" — Charley Pride; "One's on the Way" — Loretta Lynn; "To Get To You" — Jerry Wallace	**"Easy Loving" — Freddie Hart**; "Kiss an Angel Good Mornin'" — Ben Peters; "She's All I Got" — Gary U.S. Bonds, Jerry Williams Jr.; "The Happiest Girl in the Whole U.S.A." — Donna Fargo; "To Get To You" — Jean Chapel
Instrumental Group of the Year	Instrumentalist of the Year
**Danny Davis and the Nashville Brass**; Chet Atkins and Jerry Reed; Po' Boys; The Strangers; Wagon Masters	**Charlie McCoy**; Chet Atkins; Roy Clark; Floyd Cramer; Jerry Reed

== Hall of Fame ==
Country Music Hall of Fame Inductees
- Jimmie Davis
