= 1971 Country Music Association Awards =

Music award ceremony

- Date: October 10, 1971
- Location: Ryman Auditorium, Nashville, Tennessee
- Hosted by: Tennessee Ernie Ford
- Most wins: Charley Pride (2)
- Most nominations: Jerry Reed (7)

Television/radio coverage
- Network: NBC

The 1971 Country Music Association Awards, 5th Ceremony, was held on October 10, 1971, at the Ryman Auditorium, Nashville, Tennessee, and was hosted by Tennessee Ernie Ford. This was the last CMA ceremony to be broadcast by NBC.

== Winners and nominees ==
Winners in Bold.

Entertainer of the Year	Album of the Year
**Charley Pride**; Merle Haggard; Loretta Lynn; Jerry Reed; Conway Twitty	**I Won't Mention It Again — Ray Price**; A Tribute to the Best Damn Fiddle Player in the World — Merle Haggard; Help Me Make It Through the Night — Sammi Smith; Rose Garden — Lynn Anderson; When You're Hot, You're Hot — Jerry Reed
Male Vocalist of the Year	Female Vocalist of the Year
**Charley Pride**; Merle Haggard; Ray Price; Jerry Reed; Conway Twitty	**Lynn Anderson**; Loretta Lynn; Dolly Parton; Sammi Smith; Tammy Wynette
Vocal Group of the Year	Vocal Duo of the Year
**The Osborne Brothers**; The Carter Family; Hager Twins; Statler Brothers; Tompall & the Glaser Brothers	**Porter Wagoner and Dolly Parton**; Johnny Cash and June Carter Cash; George Jones and Tammy Wynette; Charlie Louvin and Melba Montgomery; Conway Twitty and Loretta Lynn
Single of the Year	Song of the Year
**"Help Me Make It Through the Night" — Sammi Smith**; "Amos Moses" — Jerry Reed; "Easy Loving" — Freddie Hart; "Rose Garden" — Lynn Anderson; "When You're Hot, You're Hot" — Jerry Reed	**"Easy Loving" — Freddie Hart**; "Coal Miner's Daughter" — Loretta Lynn; "Put Your Hand in the Hand" — Gene MacLellan; "The Year That Clayton Delaney Died" — Tom T. Hall; "When You're Hot, You're Hot" — Jerry Reed
Instrumental Group of the Year	Instrumentalist of the Year
**Danny Davis and the Nashville Brass**; The Buckaroos; Po' Boys; The Strangers; Wagon Masters	**Jerry Reed**; Chet Atkins; Roy Clark; Floyd Cramer; Boots Randolph

== Hall of Fame ==
Country Music Hall of Fame Inductees
- Art Satherley
