= 8th Academy of Country and Western Music Awards =

US music awards ceremony in 1973

- Date: February 26, 1973
- Location: Knott's Berry Farm, Buena Park, California
- Hosted by: Dick Clark

Highlights
- Most wins: Donna Fargo (4)
- Most nominations: Merle Haggard (6)

Television/radio coverage
- Network: ABC

The 8th Academy of Country and Western Music Awards ceremony was held on February 26, 1973, at Knott's Berry Farm, Buena Park, California. It was hosted by Dick Clark.

== Winners and nominees ==
Winners are shown in bold.

Entertainer of the Year	Album of the Year
**Roy Clark**; Merle Haggard; Freddie Hart; Loretta Lynn; Charley Pride	**The Happiest Girl in the Whole U.S.A. — Donna Fargo**; Baby Don't Get Hooked On Me — Mac Davis; Best of the Best — Merle Haggard; Bless Your Heart — Freddie Hart; It's Not Love (But It's Not Bad) — Merle Haggard; Let Me Tell You About a Song — Merle Haggard
Top Female Vocalist of the Year	Top Male Vocalist of the Year
**Donna Fargo**; Loretta Lynn; Anne Murray; Dolly Parton; Susan Raye	**Merle Haggard**; Tony Booth; Freddie Hart; Ray Price; Charley Pride; Conway Twitty
Single Record of the Year	Song of the Year
**"The Happiest Girl In the Whole USA"** — **Donna Fargo**; "If You Leave Me Tonight I'll Cry" — Jerry Wallace; "It's Four in the Morning" — Faron Young; "It's Not Love (But It's Not Bad)" — Merle Haggard; "Pass Me By (If You're Only Passing Through)" — Johnny Rodriguez	**"The Happiest Girl In the Whole USA"** — **Donna Fargo**; "Bless Your Heart" — Freddie Hart, Jack Lebsock; "Funny Face" — Donna Fargo; "It's Four in the Morning" — Jerry Chesnut; "To Get To You" — Jean Chapel
Most Promising Male Vocalist	Most Promising Female Vocalist
**Johnny Rodriguez**; Larry Booth; Little Joe Shaver; Red Simpson; Red Stegall	**Tanya Tucker**; Sharon Leighton; Jonie Mosby; Bobbie Roy; Kathy Smith
Top Vocal Group of the Year
**Statler Brothers**; Brush Arbor; The Buckaroos; The Leightons; Conway Twitty and Loretta Lynn
Pioneer Award
**Gene Autry**; **Cliffie Stone**
