= Got the All Overs for You (All over Me) =

1972 single by Freddie Hart

Single by Freddie Hart

from the album Got the All Overs for You
- B-side: "Just Another Girl"
- Released: October 1972
- Genre: Country
- Label: Capitol
- Songwriter(s): Freddie Hart
- Producer(s): Earl Ball

Freddie Hart singles chronology
"Bless Your Heart" (1972)	"Got the All Overs for You (All over Me)" (1972)	"Super Kind of Woman" (1973)

"Got the All Overs For You (All over Me)' is a 1972 single by Freddie Hart and the Heartbeats. "Got the All Overs For You (All over Me)" was Freddie Hart's fourth number one on the country chart. The single stayed at number one for three weeks and spent a total of sixteen weeks on the country chart.

== Chart performance ==
Chart (1972)	Peak position
U.S. Billboard Hot Country Singles	1
Canadian RPM Country Tracks	1
