= You Are the Song (Inside of Me) =

Single by Freddie Hart

from the album The First Time
- B-side: "I Can Almost See Houston from Here"
- Released: January 1976
- Genre: Country
- Label: Capitol

Freddie Hart singles chronology
"Warm Side of You" (1975)	"You Are the Song (Inside of Me)" (1976)	"She'll Throw Stones at You" (1976)

"You Are the Song (Inside of Me)" is a single by American country music artist Freddie Hart. Released in January 1976, it was the third single from his album The First Time. The song peaked at number 11 on the Billboard Hot Country Singles chart. It also reached number 1 on the RPM Country Tracks chart in Canada.

== Chart performance ==
Chart (1976)	Peak position
U.S. Billboard Hot Country Singles	11
Canadian RPM Country Tracks	1
