= My Hang-Up Is You =

Single by Freddie Hart

from the album My Hang-Up Is You
- B-side: "Big Bad Wolf"
- Released: January 17, 1972
- Genre: Country
- Label: Capitol
- Songwriter(s): Freddie Hart
- Producer(s): Earl Ball

Freddie Hart singles chronology
"Easy Loving" (1971)	"My Hang-Up Is You" (1972)	"Bless Your Heart" (1972)

"My Hang-Up Is You" is a 1972 single by Freddie Hart and the Heartbeats. "My Hang-Up Is You" was Hart's second number one on the U.S. country singles chart. The single stayed at number one for six weeks and spent a total of eighteen weeks on the chart.

== Chart performance ==
Chart (1972)	Peak position
U.S. Billboard Hot Country Singles	1
Canadian RPM Country Tracks	1
