= Super Kind of Woman =

Single by Freddie Hart

from the album Super Kind of Woman
- B-side: "Mother Nature Made a Believer Out of Me"
- Released: January 1973
- Genre: Country
- Label: Capitol
- Songwriter(s): Jack Lebsock
- Producer(s): Bob Morris

Freddie Hart singles chronology
"Got the All Overs For You (All Over Me)" (1972)	"Super Kind of Woman" (1973)	"Born a Fool" (1973)

"Super Kind of Woman" is a 1973 single by Freddie Hart and the Heartbeats. The single was Freddie Hart's fifth number one on the country charts, and it stayed at number one for a single week and spent twelve weeks on the country chart.

== Charts ==
=== Weekly charts ===
Chart (1973)	Peak position
Australian (Kent Music Report)	80
US Hot Country Songs (Billboard)	1
Canadian RPM Country Tracks	1

=== Year-end charts ===
Chart (1973)	Position
US Hot Country Songs (Billboard)	40
