= The First Time (Freddie Hart song) =

Single by Freddie Hart

from the album The First Time
- B-side: "Sexy"
- Released: June 1975
- Genre: Country
- Label: Capitol
- Songwriter(s): Jack Lebsock
- Producer(s): George Richey

Freddie Hart singles chronology
"I'd Like to Sleep Til I Get Over You" (1975)	"The First Time" (1975)	"Warm Side of You" (1975)

"The First Time" is a single by American country music artist Freddie Hart. Released in June 1975, it was the first single from his album The First Time. The song peaked at number 2 on the Billboard Hot Country Singles chart. It also reached number 1 on the RPM Country Tracks chart in Canada.

== Charts ==
Chart (1975)	Peak position
U.S. Billboard Hot Country Singles	2
Canadian RPM Country Tracks	1
