= 7th Academy of Country and Western Music Awards =

US music awards ceremony in 1972

- Date: March 13, 1972
- Location: Knott's Berry Farm, Buena Park, California
- Hosted by: Dick Clark

Highlights
- Most wins: Freddie Hart (5)
- Most nominations: Merle Haggard (6)

Television/radio coverage
- Network: ABC

The 7th Academy of Country and Western Music Awards ceremony was held on March 13, 1972, at Knott's Berry Farm, Buena Park, California. It was hosted by Dick Clark.

== Winners and nominees ==
Winners are shown in bold.

| Entertainer of the Year | Album of the Year |
|---|---|
| **Freddie Hart**; Glen Campbell; Merle Haggard; Loretta Lynn; Charley Pride | **Easy Loving — Freddie Hart**; Charley Pride Sings Heart Songs — Charley Pride; Hag — Merle Haggard; I Won't Mention It Again — Ray Price; Someday We'll Look Back — Merle Haggard |
| Top Female Vocalist of the Year | Top Male Vocalist of the Year |
| **Loretta Lynn**; Lynn Anderson; Anne Murray; Susan Raye; Linda Ronstadt | **Freddie Hart**; Merle Haggard; Charley Pride; Marty Robbins; Conway Twitty |
| Country Comedy Act of the Year | Top Vocal Group or Duet of the Year |
| **Roy Clark**; Don Bowman; Pat Buttram; Mel Tillis; Sheb Wooley | **Conway Twitty and Loretta Lynn**; The Leightons; Johnny & Jonie Mosby; The Statler Brothers; Porter Wagoner and Dolly Parton |
| Single Record of the Year | Song of the Year |
| **"Easy Loving"** — **Freddie Hart**; "Carolyn" — Merle Haggard; "Kiss an Angel Good Mornin'" — Charley Pride; "Lead Me On" — Conway Twitty and Loretta Lynn; "One's on the Way" — Loretta Lynn | **"Easy Loving"** — **Freddie Hart**; "Carolyn" — Tommy Collins; "Kiss an Angel Good Mornin'" — Ben Peters; "Lead Me On" — Leon Copeland; "Lovin' Her Was Easier (Than Anything I'll Ever Do Again)" — Kris Kristofferson |
| Most Promising Male Vocalist | Most Promising Female Vocalist |
| **Tony Booth**; Gene Davis; Mayf Nutter; Red Stegall; Bobby Wright | **Barbara Mandrell**; Kenni Husky; Jae Judy Kay; Lynda Peace; Jeanne Pruett |
