= Jack Grayson =

American country music artist

- Birth name: Jack Lebsock
- Also known as: "Blackjack" Jack Grayson
- Origin: Sterling, Colorado, United States
- Genres: Country
- Occupation: Singer
- Instrument: Vocals
- Years active: 1973–1984
- Labels: Capitol, Churchill, Hitbound, Koala, Joe-Wes, AMI

Jack Lebsock is an American country music artist, also known as Jack Grayson, "Blackjack" Jack Grayson and Jack Grayson and Blackjack. He recorded under various labels between 1973 and 1984, charting thirteen times on the Billboard Hot Country Singles (now Hot Country Songs) charts. Grayson's biggest chart hit is a No. 18-peaking cover of Percy Sledge's "When a Man Loves a Woman." Lebsock was also, in the 1970s, a writer for ABC Music Publishing, having written songs for Roy Clark. He also wrote three of Freddie Hart's singles: "Bless Your Heart", "Super Kind of Woman", and "The First Time".

== Discography ==
=== Albums ===
Year	Album	Chart Positions
Year	Album	US Country
1982	When a Man Loves a Woman	37
1982	Jack Grayson Sings	59

=== Singles ===
Recording name	Year	Single	Chart Positions
Recording name	Year	Single	US Country
Jack Lebsock	1973	"For Lovers Only"	94
Jack Lebsock	1974	"Lovin' Comes Easy"	76
"Blackjack" Jack Grayson	1979	"I Ain't Never Been to Heaven (But I've Spent the Night with You)"	92
"Blackjack" Jack Grayson	1979	"Tonight I'm Feelin' You (All Over Again)"	65
"Blackjack" Jack Grayson	1980	"The Stores Are Full of Roses"	70
"Blackjack" Jack Grayson	1980	"The Devil Stands Only Five Foot Five"	59
Jack Grayson and Blackjack	1980	"A Loser's Night Out"	37
Jack Grayson and Blackjack	1981	"Magic Eyes"	56
Jack Grayson and Blackjack	1981	"My Beginning Was You"	45
Jack Grayson and Blackjack	1981	"When a Man Loves a Woman"	18
Jack Grayson	1982	"Tonight I'm Feelin' You (All Over Again)" (re-recording)	38
Jack Grayson	1982	"I Ain't Giving Up on Her Yet"	68
Jack Grayson	1984	"Lean on Me"	77
