= 9th Academy of Country Music Awards =

US music awards ceremony in 1974

- Date: March 25, 1974
- Location: Knott's Berry Farm, Buena Park, California
- Hosted by: Charlie Rich; Roger Miller

Highlights
- Most wins: Charlie Rich (4)
- Most nominations: Charlie Rich (7)

Television/radio coverage
- Network: ABC

The 9th Academy of Country Music Awards ceremony was held on March 25, 1974, at Knott's Berry Farm, Buena Park, California. It was hosted by Charlie Rich and Roger Miller.

== Winners and nominees ==
Winners are shown in bold.

Entertainer of the Year	Album of the Year
**Roy Clark**; Merle Haggard; Charlie Rich; Johnny Rodriguez; Mel Tillis	**Behind Closed Doors — Charlie Rich**; I Love Dixie Blues — Merle Haggard; Introducing Johnny Rodriguez — Johnny Rodriguez; Louisiana Woman, Mississippi Man — Conway Twitty, Loretta Lynn; Love Is the Foundation — Loretta Lynn
Top Female Vocalist of the Year	Top Male Vocalist of the Year
**Loretta Lynn**; Barbara Fairchild; Donna Fargo; Anne Murray; Dolly Parton; Susan Raye	**Charlie Rich**; Merle Haggard; Tom T. Hall; Marty Robbins; Johnny Rodriguez; Conway Twitty
Single Record of the Year	Song of the Year
**"Behind Closed Doors"** — **Charlie Rich**; "If We Make It Through December" — Merle Haggard; "The Most Beautiful Girl" — Charlie Rich; "Satin Sheets" — Jeanne Pruett; "The Americans" — Byron MacGregor	**"Behind Closed Doors"** — **Kenny O'Dell**; "If We Make It Through December" — Merle Haggard; "The Most Beautiful Girl" — Rory Bourke, Billy Sherrill, Norro Wilson; "(Old Dogs, Children and) Watermelon Wine" — Tom T. Hall; "Why Me" — Kris Kristofferson
Most Promising Male Vocalist	Most Promising Female Vocalist
**Dorsey Burnette**; Larry Booth; Danny Michaels; Ronnie Milsap; Little Joe Shaver; Red Stegall	**Olivia Newton-John**; Debbie Hawkins; Sharon Leighton; Lawanda Lindsey; Linda Ronstadt
Top Vocal Duet or Group of the Year
**Brush Arbor**; The Chaparral Brothers; Statler Brothers; Conway Twitty and Loretta Lynn; Porter Wagoner and Dolly Parton
Pioneer Award
**Hank Williams**
