= Country Music Association Award for Male Vocalist of the Year =

Music award

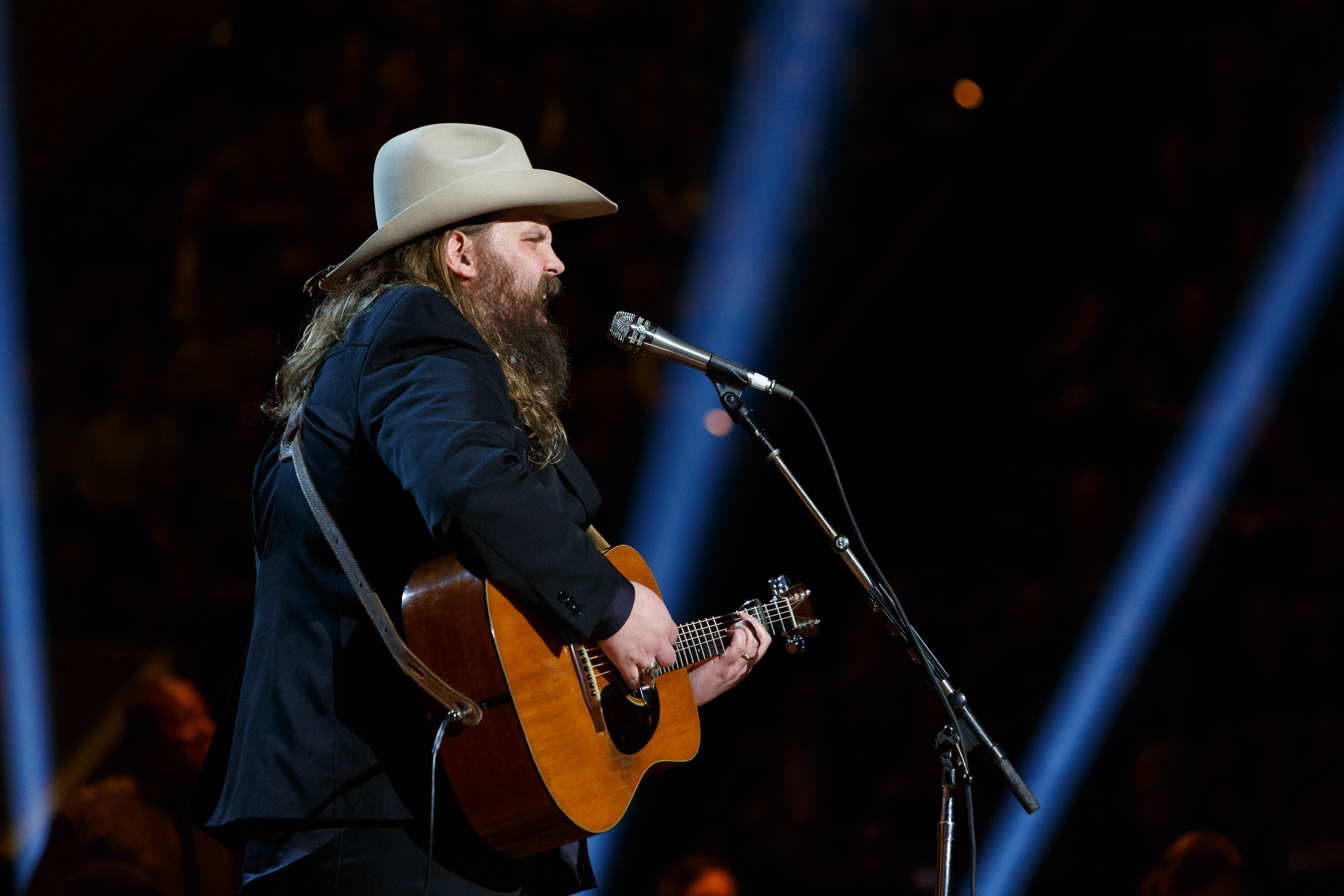
- Current winner of the award Chris Stapleton
- Country: United States
- Presented by: Country Music Association
- First award: 1967
- Currently held by: Chris Stapleton (2026)

The following list shows the recipients for the Country Music Association Award for Male Vocalist of the Year. This Award goes to the artist. The Award is based on individual musical performance on a solo Country single or album release, as well as the overall contribution to Country Music. This award was one of the original awards given at the first ceremony in 1967.

The inaugural recipient of the award was Jack Greene in 1967. Chris Stapleton holds the record for most wins in the category, with nine, while five-time recipient George Strait has a leading twenty-five nominations. Dierks Bentley and Eric Church holds the record for most nominations without a win, with nine each.

== Recipients ==
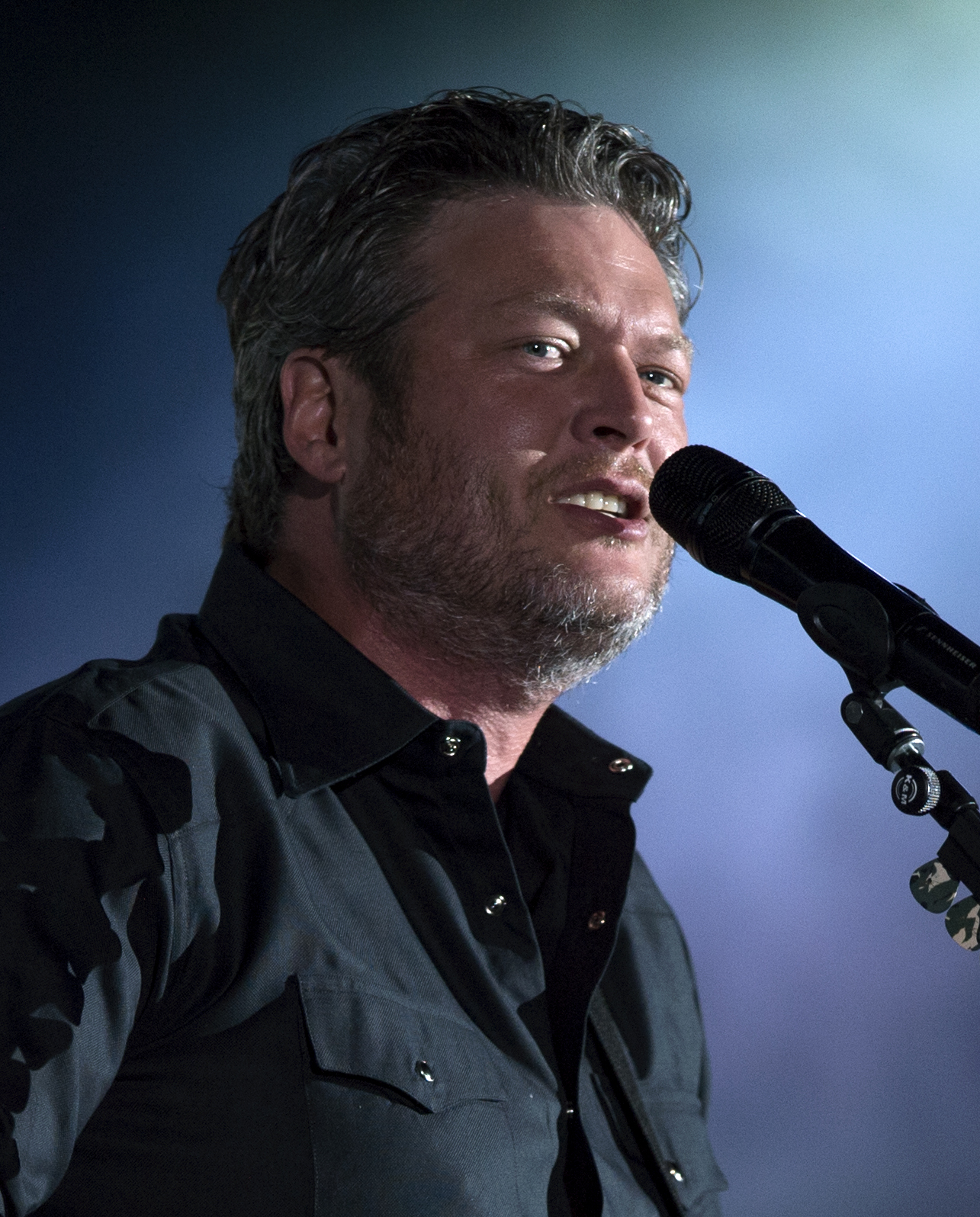
Blake Shelton is tied for the second most wins in this category with five.

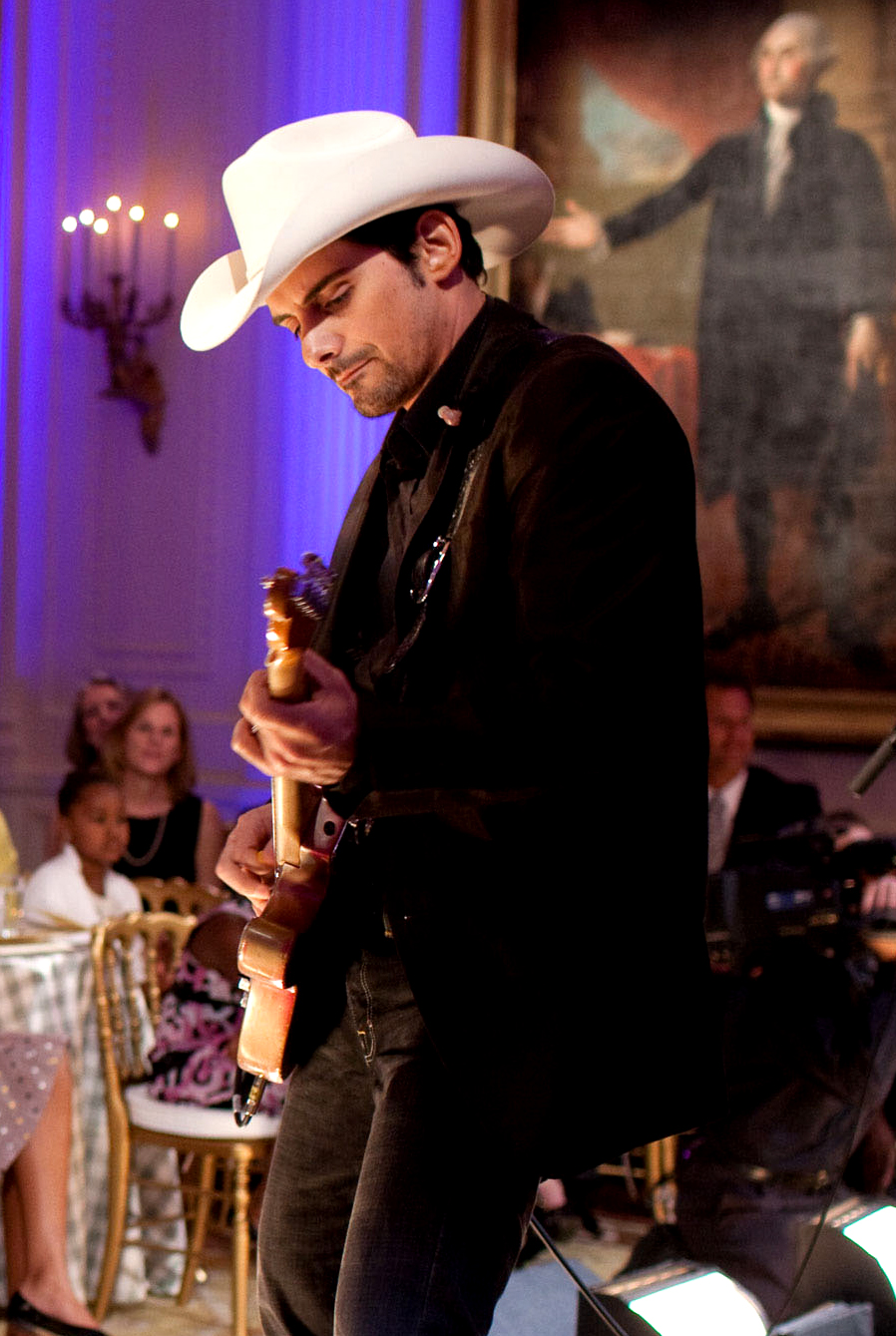
Three-time winner Brad Paisley was crowned Entertainer of the Year in 2010.

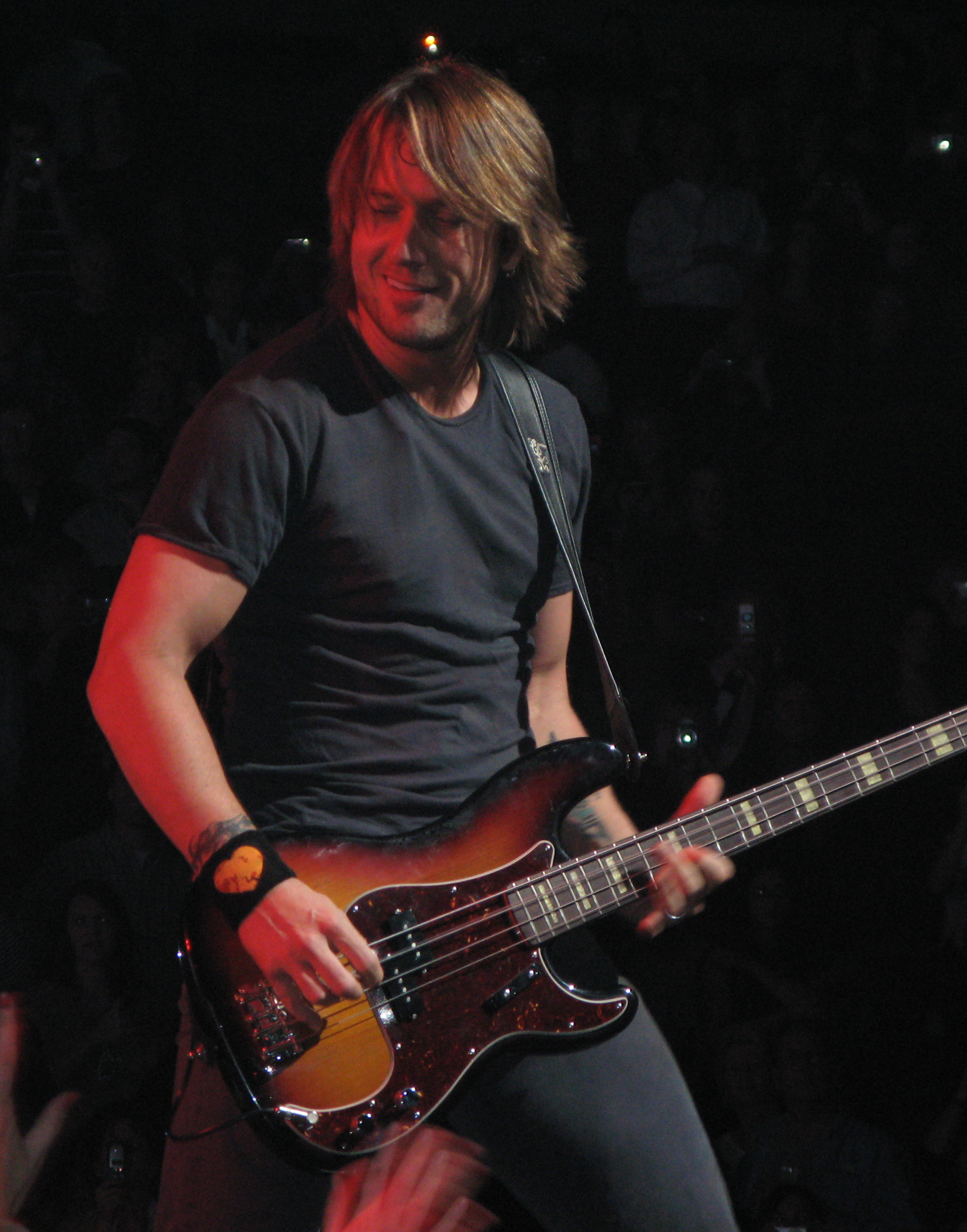
Keith Urban has received nine nominations and three wins.

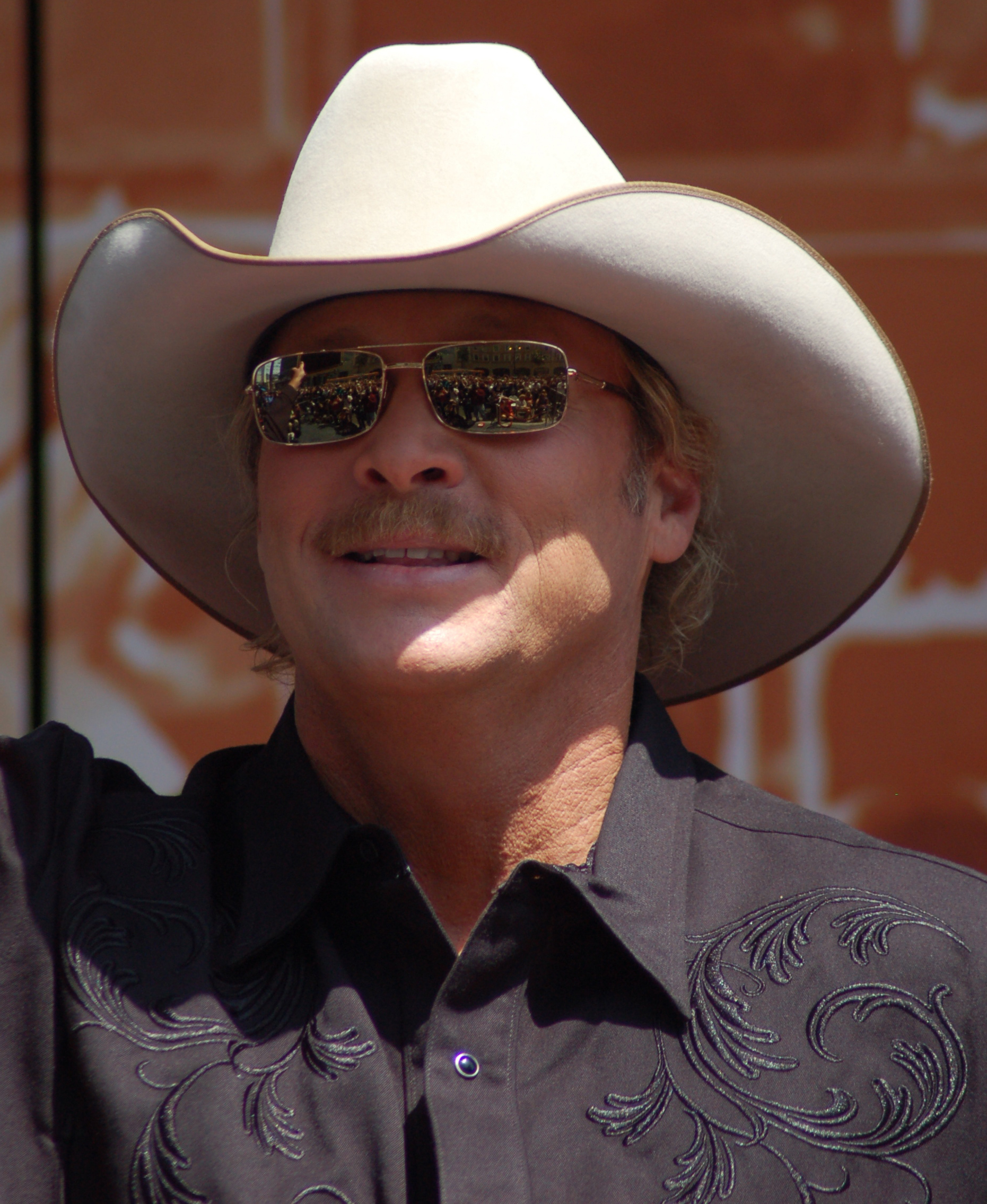
Alan Jackson was the back-to-back male vocalist in 2002 and 2003.

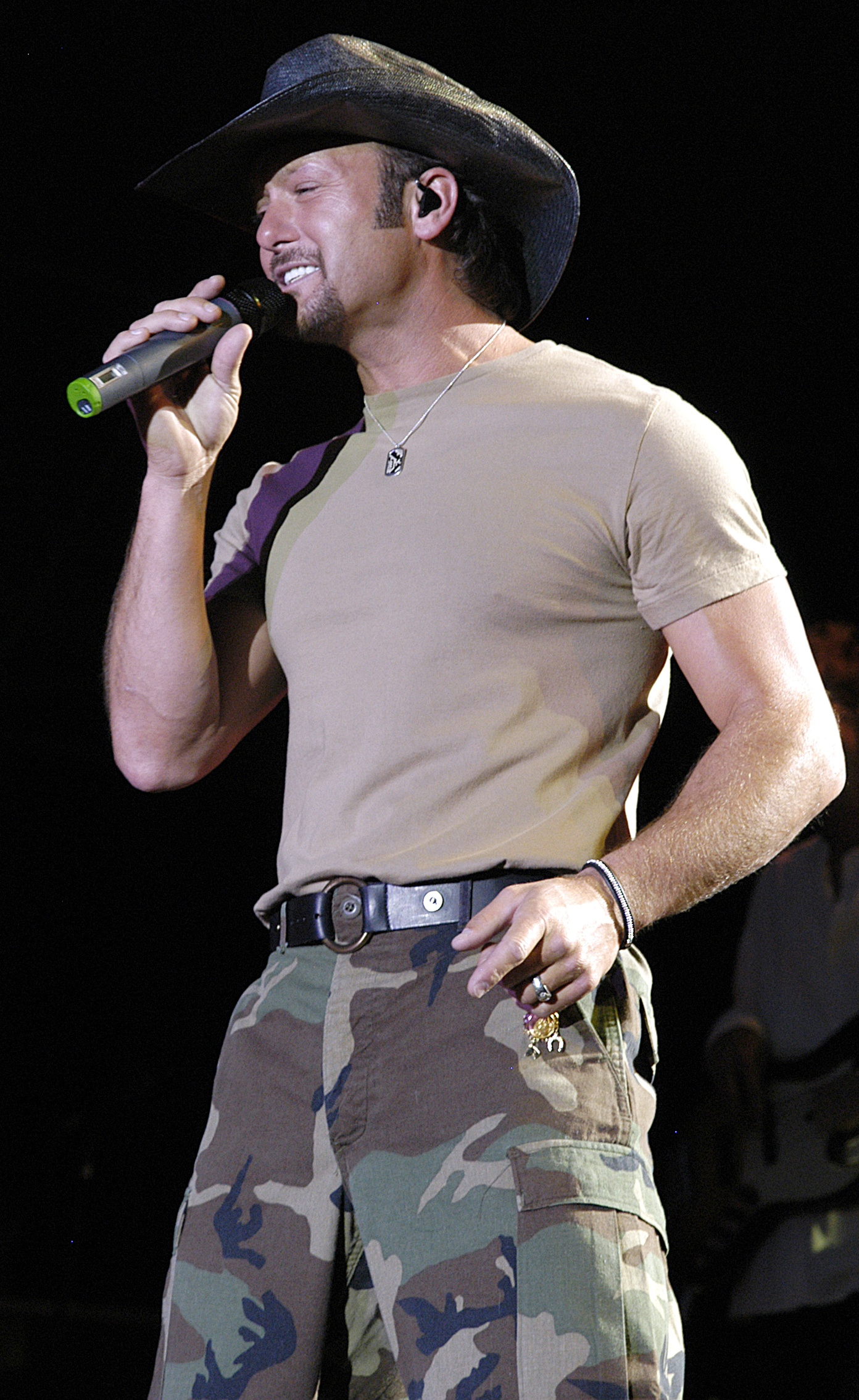
Two-time winner Tim McGraw.

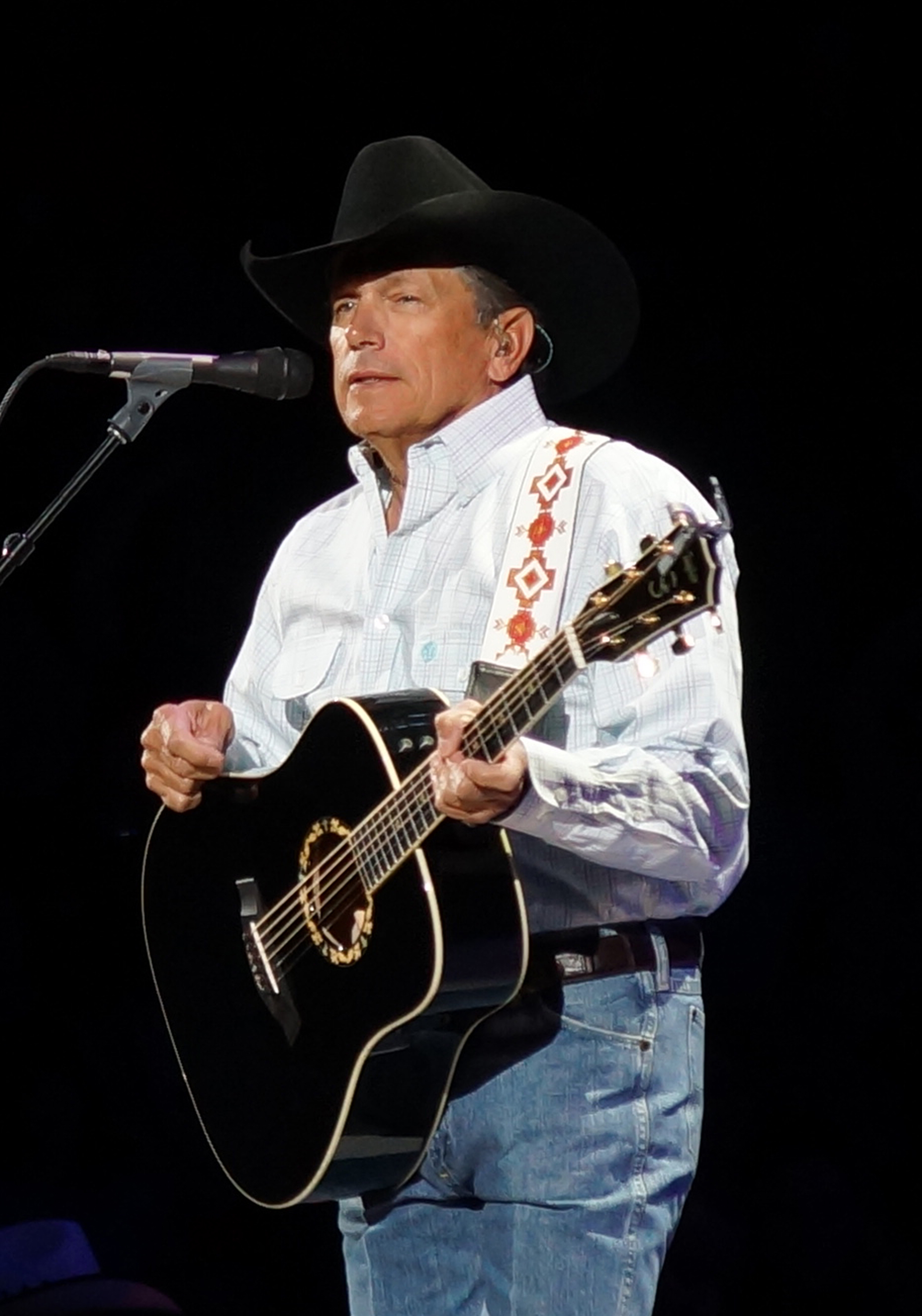
George Strait is tied for the second most wins in this category.

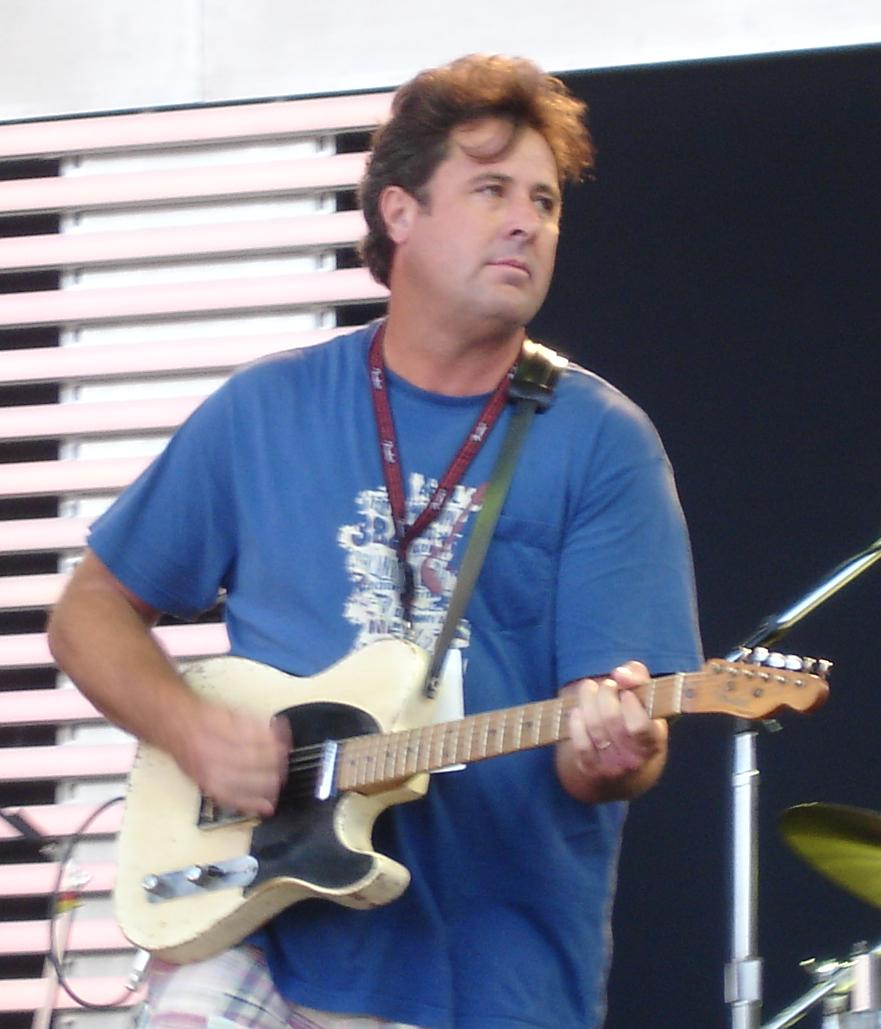
Five-time recipient Vince Gill is also a back-to-back Entertainer of the Year.

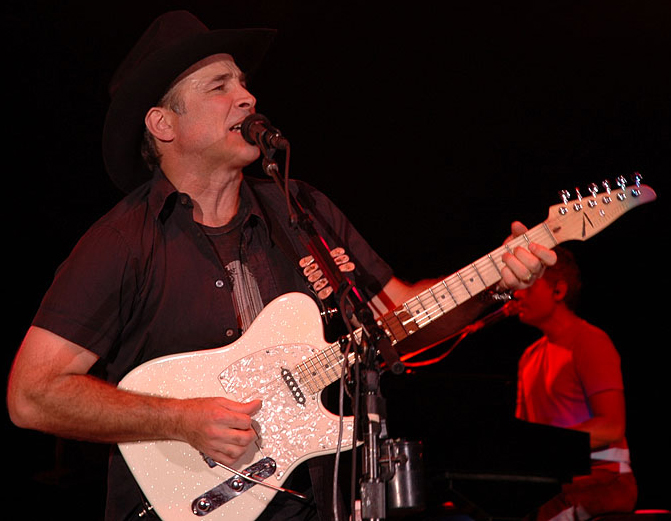
Clint Black won the award in 1990.

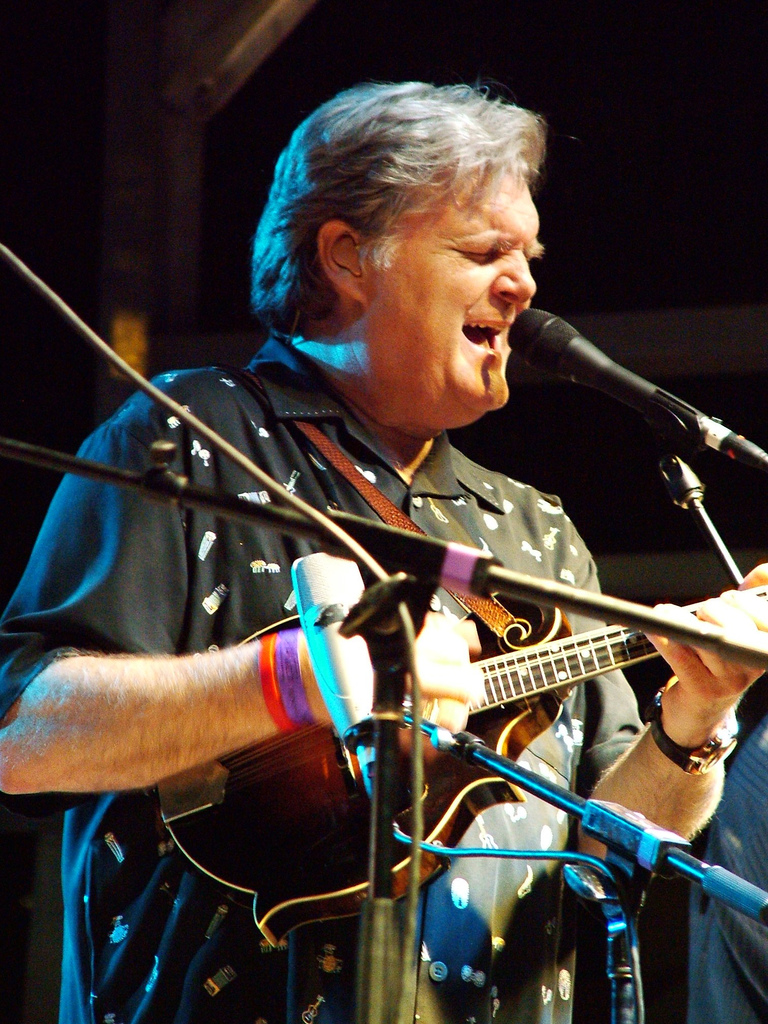
1982 recipient Ricky Skaggs

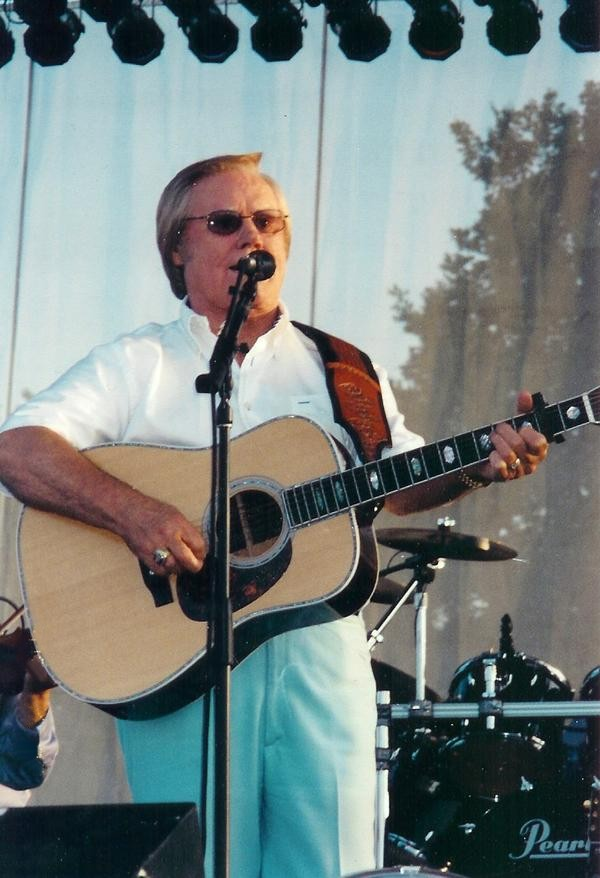
George Jones was nominated five times and won twice.

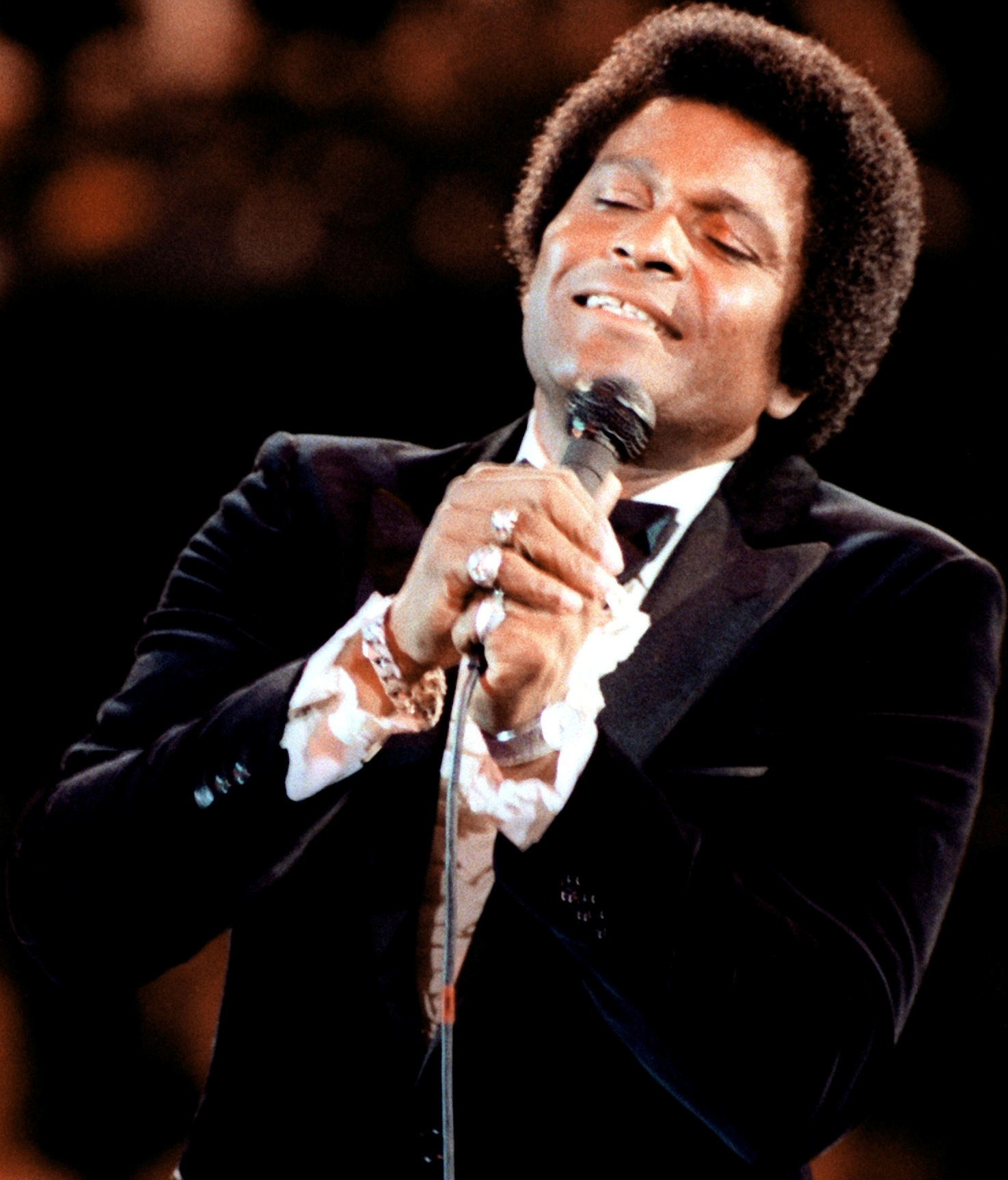
1972 and 1973 winner Charley Pride was the first person of colour to ever win a CMA Award.

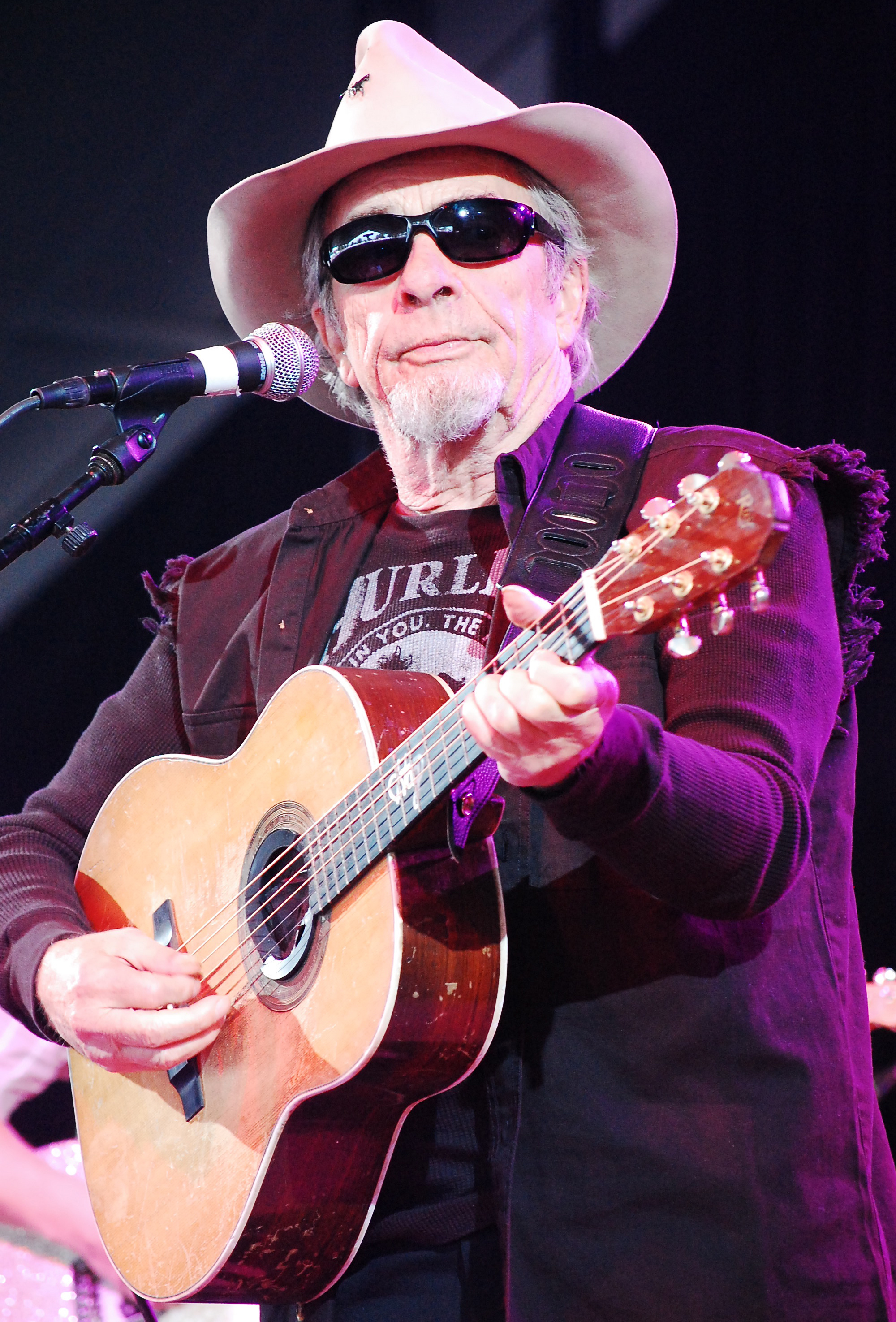
Merle Haggard won both the male vocalist and Entertainer of the Year awards in 1970.

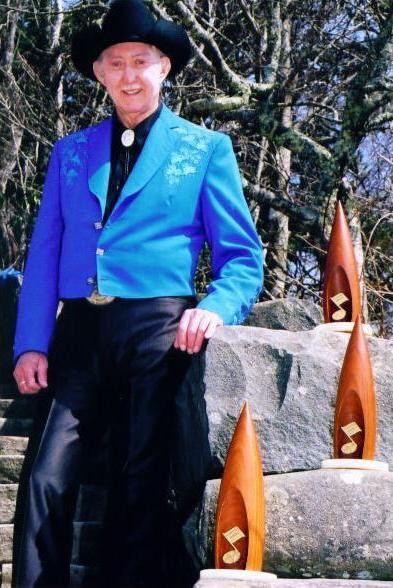
Inaugural recipient Jack Greene also won Single and Album of the Year awards at the 1967 ceremony.

Year	Winner	Nominees
2026	Chris Stapleton	Luke Combs; Cody Johnson; Zach Top; Stephen Wilson Jr.
2025	Cody Johnson	Luke Combs; Chris Stapleton; Zach Top; Morgan Wallen
2024	Chris Stapleton	Luke Combs; Jelly Roll; Cody Johnson; Morgan Wallen
2023	Chris Stapleton	Luke Combs; Jelly Roll; Cody Johnson; Morgan Wallen
2022	Chris Stapleton	Eric Church; Luke Combs; Cody Johnson; Morgan Wallen
2021	Chris Stapleton	Dierks Bentley; Eric Church; Luke Combs; Thomas Rhett
2020	Luke Combs	Eric Church; Thomas Rhett; Chris Stapleton; Keith Urban
2019	Luke Combs	Dierks Bentley; Thomas Rhett; Chris Stapleton; Keith Urban
2018	Chris Stapleton	Dierks Bentley; Luke Combs; Thomas Rhett; Keith Urban
2017	Chris Stapleton	Dierks Bentley; Eric Church; Thomas Rhett; Keith Urban
2016	Chris Stapleton	Dierks Bentley; Eric Church; Tim McGraw; Keith Urban
2015	Chris Stapleton	Dierks Bentley; Luke Bryan; Eric Church; Blake Shelton
2014	Blake Shelton	Dierks Bentley; Luke Bryan; Eric Church; Keith Urban
2013	Blake Shelton	Jason Aldean; Luke Bryan; Eric Church; Keith Urban
2012	Blake Shelton	Jason Aldean; Luke Bryan; Eric Church; Keith Urban
2011	Blake Shelton	Jason Aldean; Kenny Chesney; Brad Paisley; Keith Urban
2010	Blake Shelton	Dierks Bentley; Brad Paisley; George Strait; Keith Urban
2009	Brad Paisley	Kenny Chesney; Darius Rucker; George Strait; Keith Urban
2008	Brad Paisley	Kenny Chesney; Alan Jackson; George Strait; Keith Urban
2007	Brad Paisley	Kenny Chesney; George Strait; Josh Turner; Keith Urban
2006	Keith Urban	Dierks Bentley; Kenny Chesney; Alan Jackson; Brad Paisley
2005	Keith Urban	Kenny Chesney; Alan Jackson; Brad Paisley; George Strait
2004	Keith Urban	Kenny Chesney; Alan Jackson; Toby Keith; George Strait
2003	Alan Jackson	Kenny Chesney; Toby Keith; Tim McGraw; Brad Paisley; George Strait
2002	Alan Jackson	Kenny Chesney; Toby Keith; Brad Paisley; George Strait
2001	Toby Keith	Alan Jackson; Tim McGraw; Brad Paisley; George Strait
2000	Tim McGraw	Vince Gill; Alan Jackson; Brad Paisley; George Strait
1999	Tim McGraw	Vince Gill; Alan Jackson; George Strait; Steve Wariner
1998	George Strait	Garth Brooks; Vince Gill; Tim McGraw; Collin Raye
1997	George Strait	Vince Gill; Alan Jackson; Collin Raye; Bryan White
1996	George Strait	Vince Gill; Alan Jackson; Collin Raye; Bryan White
1995	Vince Gill	Alan Jackson; John Berry; John Michael Montgomery; George Strait
1994	Vince Gill	John Anderson; Alan Jackson; George Strait; Dwight Yoakam
1993	Vince Gill	John Anderson; Garth Brooks; Alan Jackson; George Strait
1992	Vince Gill	Garth Brooks; Joe Diffie; Alan Jackson; Travis Tritt
1991	Vince Gill	Clint Black; Garth Brooks; Alan Jackson; George Strait
1990	Clint Black	Garth Brooks; Rodney Crowell; George Strait; Ricky Van Shelton
1989	Ricky Van Shelton	Rodney Crowell; George Strait; Randy Travis; Keith Whitley
1988	Randy Travis	Vern Gosdin; George Strait; Ricky Van Shelton; Hank Williams Jr.
1987	Randy Travis	George Jones; Ricky Skaggs; George Strait; Hank Williams Jr.
1986	George Strait	George Jones; Gary Morris; Randy Travis; Hank Williams Jr.
1985	George Strait	Lee Greenwood; Gary Morris; Ricky Skaggs; Hank Williams Jr.
1984	Lee Greenwood	Merle Haggard; Gary Morris; Ricky Skaggs; George Strait
1983	Lee Greenwood	John Anderson; Merle Haggard; Willie Nelson; Ricky Skaggs
1982	Ricky Skaggs	Merle Haggard; George Jones; Ronnie Milsap; Willie Nelson
1981	George Jones	Ronnie Milsap; Willie Nelson; Kenny Rogers; Don Williams
1980	George Jones	John Conlee; Willie Nelson; Kenny Rogers; Don Williams
1979	Kenny Rogers	John Conlee; Larry Gatlin; Willie Nelson; Don Williams
1978	Don Williams	Larry Gatlin; Ronnie Milsap; Willie Nelson; Kenny Rogers
1977	Ronnie Milsap	Larry Gatlin; Waylon Jennings; Kenny Rogers; Don Williams
1976	Ronnie Milsap	Waylon Jennings; Willie Nelson; Conway Twitty; Don Williams
1975	Waylon Jennings	John Denver; Freddy Fender; Ronnie Milsap; Conway Twitty
1974	Ronnie Milsap	Merle Haggard; Waylon Jennings; Charlie Rich; Cal Smith
1973	Charlie Rich	Merle Haggard; Tom T. Hall; Johnny Rodriguez; Conway Twitty
1972	Charley Pride	Merle Haggard; Freddie Hart; Johnny Paycheck; Jerry Wallace
1971	Charley Pride	Merle Haggard; Ray Price; Jerry Reed; Conway Twitty
1970	Merle Haggard	Johnny Cash; Charley Pride; Marty Robbins; Conway Twitty
1969	Johnny Cash	Glen Campbell; Merle Haggard; Sonny James; Charley Pride
1968	Glen Campbell	Eddy Arnold; Johnny Cash; Merle Haggard; Charley Pride
1967	Jack Greene	Eddy Arnold; Merle Haggard; Sonny James; Buck Owens

== Artists with multiple wins ==
Artists that received multiple awards
Awards	Artist
9	Chris Stapleton
5	Blake Shelton
5	George Strait
5	Vince Gill
3	Brad Paisley
3	Keith Urban
3	Ronnie Milsap
2	Alan Jackson
2	Charley Pride
2	George Jones
2	Lee Greenwood
2	Luke Combs
2	Randy Travis
2	Tim McGraw

== Artists with multiple nominations ==
25 nominations

- George Strait

16 nominations

- Alan Jackson
- Keith Urban

12 nominations

- Chris Stapleton

11 nominations

- Brad Paisley
- Merle Haggard

10 nominations

- Vince Gill

9 nominations

- Dierks Bentley
- Eric Church
- Kenny Chesney
- Luke Combs

7 nominations

- Ronnie Milsap
- Willie Nelson

6 nominations

- Blake Shelton
- Don Williams
- Tim McGraw

5 nominations

- Charley Pride
- Conway Twitty
- Garth Brooks
- George Jones
- Kenny Rogers
- Ricky Skaggs
- Thomas Rhett
- Cody Johnson

4 nominations

- Hank Williams Jr.
- Luke Bryan
- Morgan Wallen
- Randy Travis
- Toby Keith
- Waylon Jennings

3 nominations

- Collin Raye
- Gary Morris
- Jason Aldean
- John Anderson
- Johnny Cash
- Larry Gatlin
- Lee Greenwood
- Ricky Van Shelton

2 nominations

- Bryan White
- Charlie Rich
- Clint Black
- Eddy Arnold
- Glen Campbell
- Jelly Roll
- John Conlee
- Rodney Crowell
- Sonny James
- Zach Top

=== Won on First nomination ===
In CMA history only thirteen men have won Male Vocalist of the Year the very first time they were nominated. They are:

- Jack Greene (1967)
- Glen Campbell (1968)
- Charlie Rich (1973)
- Ronnie Milsap (1974)
- George Jones (1980)
- Ricky Skaggs (1982)
- Lee Greenwood (1983)
- Clint Black (1990)
- Vince Gill (1991)
- Toby Keith (2001)
- Keith Urban (2004)
- Blake Shelton (2010)
- Chris Stapleton (2015)

== See also ==
- Country Music Association Awards
