= If You Leave Me Tonight I'll Cry =

1972 song by Jerry Wallace

Single by Jerry Wallace

from the album To Get to You
- B-side: "What's He Doin' In My World?"
- Released: June 1972 (U.S.)
- Recorded: 1972
- Genre: Country
- Length: 2:45
- Label: Decca Records
- Songwriter(s): Hal Mooney, Gerald Sanford
- Producer(s): Joe E. Johnson

Jerry Wallace singles chronology
"To Get To You" (1972)	"If You Leave Me Tonight I'll Cry" (1972)	"Do You Know What It's Like To Be Lonesome" (1972)

"If You Leave Me Tonight I'll Cry" is a song made famous by country music singer Jerry Wallace. Originally released in 1972, the song was the only number-one song during Wallace's recording career.

== In popular culture ==
- The song was featured prominently as part of the plot in the third and final "segment" of a 1972 episode of Night Gallery: "The Tune in Dan's Cafe."

== Charts ==
Chart (1972)	Peak position
U.S. Billboard Hot Country Singles	1
U.S. Billboard Hot 100	38
Canadian RPM Country Tracks	3
Canadian RPM Top Singles	38
