= 6th Academy of Country and Western Music Awards =

US music awards ceremony in 1971

- Date: March 22, 1971
- Location: Hollywood Palladium, Los Angeles, California
- Hosted by: Dick Clark

Highlights
- Most wins: Ray Price (3)
- Most nominations: Merle Haggard (6)

The 6th Academy of Country and Western Music Awards ceremony was held on March 22, 1971, at Hollywood Palladium, Los Angeles, California. It was hosted by Dick Clark.

== Winners and nominees ==
Winners are shown in bold.

Entertainer of the Year	Album of the Year
**Merle Haggard**; Glen Campbell; Johnny Cash; Elvis Presley; Charley Pride	**For the Good Times — Ray Price**; A Tribute to the Best Damn Fiddle Player in the World — Merle Haggard; Charley Pride's 10th Album — Charley Pride; Fightin' Side of Me — Merle Haggard; The Glen Campbell Goodtime Album — Glen Campbell
Top Female Vocalist of the Year	Top Male Vocalist of the Year
**Lynn Anderson**; Bobbie Gentry; Loretta Lynn; Dolly Parton; Tammy Wynette	**Merle Haggard**; Glen Campbell; Ray Price; Charley Pride; Marty Robbins
Country Comedy Act of the Year	Top Vocal Group of the Year
**Roy Clark**; Don Bowman; Homer and Jethro; Junior Samples; Sheb Wooley	**The Kimberleys**; The Glaser Brothers; Johnny & Jonie Mosby; Sons of the Pioneers; Porter Wagoner and Dolly Parton
Single Record of the Year	Song of the Year
**"For the Good Times"** — **Ray Price**; "The Fightin' Side of Me" — Merle Haggard; "Help Me Make It Through the Night" — Sammi Smith; "Rose Garden" — Lynn Anderson; "Snowbird" — Anne Murray	**"For the Good Times"** — **Kris Kristofferson**; "The Fightin' Side of Me" — Merle Haggard; "Help Me Make It Through the Night" — Kris Kristofferson; "Rose Garden" — Joe South; "Sunday Mornin' Comin' Down" — Kris Kristofferson
Most Promising Male Vocalist	Most Promising Female Vocalist
**Buddy Alan**; Tony Booth; Mayf Nutter; Red Stegall; Bobby Wayne	**Sammi Smith**; Lynn Harper; Jae Judy Kay; Anne Murray; Susan Raye
Pioneer Award
**Patsy Montana**; **Tex Ritter**
