= Freddie Hart =

American country music singer-songwriter (1926–2018)

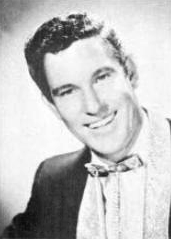
- Hart in 1966

Background information
- Born: Frederick Segrest; December 21, 1926; Loachapoka, Alabama, U.S.
- Died: October 27, 2018 (aged 91) Burbank, California, U.S.
- Genres: Country, gospel
- Occupation: Singer-songwriter
- Instrument: Guitar
- Years active: 1953–2018
- Website: freddiehart.com

Frederick Segrest (December 21, 1926 – October 27, 2018), known professionally as Freddie Hart, was an American country musician and songwriter best known for his chart-topping country song and lone pop hit "Easy Loving", which won the Country Music Association Song of the Year award in 1971 and 1972. Hart charted singles from 1953 to 1987, and later became a gospel singer. He also performed at music festivals and other venues until his death in 2018.

== Biography ==
=== Childhood and military service ===
Hart was born to a sharecropper family in Loachapoka, Alabama, United States, and spent his childhood in nearby Phenix City, Alabama, along with his 11 siblings (Nadine, Bo, Junior, Olin, Marrell, Pearl, Lonnie, Sandra, Gail, J.P., Harold, and a child who died in infancy). He learned to play guitar at age five and quit school by age 12.

At age 15, Hart lied about his age to join the U.S. Marine Corps during World War II, seeing combat action on Guam and Iwo Jima. After the war, he lived in California, where he taught classes in self-defense at the Los Angeles Police Academy.

=== Early career ===
Hart got an early career break when singer Carl Smith covered Hart's song "Loose Talk" in 1955. Other artists who recorded his songs included Patsy Cline ("Lovin' in Vain"), George Jones ("My Tears Are Overdue"), and Porter Wagoner ("Skid Row Joe").

During the early 1950s, Hart and his family moved to California to further the growing country music scene there. In 1951, he joined Lefty Frizzell's band for a year. Through Frizzell, Hart got his first recording contract with Capitol Records in 1953. He released several singles, including his version of "Loose Talk", but none of these was successful. In 1958, Hart signed with Columbia Records and scored his first chart hit with "The Wall" in 1959, which made the top 20. His biggest hit for the label was the 1960 Top-20 hit "The Key's in the Mailbox".

In 1965, Hart signed with Kapp Records, where he scored several top-40 hits between 1965 and 1968. The biggest of these hits included "Hank Williams' Guitar" (1965), "Born a Fool" (1968), and "Togetherness" (1968).

=== Resigning with Capitol Records and "Easy Loving" ===
In 1969, Hart resigned with Capitol Records and soon became a part of the Bakersfield sound by signing up with Buck Owens' songwriting and management company. In early 1970, he scored a top-30 hit with "The Whole World's Holdin' Hands". Hart's song "Togetherness", a hit for him in 1968, became a top-15 hit for Buck Owens and Susan Raye that summer. Hart scored several minor hits during the year.

In 1971, Hart released a song that he wrote called "Easy Loving", which was first recorded in the summer of 1969 for his album California Grapevine, released in 1970. Released as a single in the summer of 1971, "Easy Loving" rapidly began climbing the charts; by that September, it was number one for three weeks on the country chart and reached number 17 on the pop chart. It was also played on adult contemporary stations, earning a position on Billboard's Easy Listening survey. The song ultimately won Hart numerous awards from both the Academy of Country Music and Country Music Association. The song sold over one million copies, and was awarded a gold record by the RIAA in November 1971. The album of the same name also reportedly went gold. The song also earned Hart a Grammy Award nomination.

From this success, Hart and his backup band, the Heartbeats, had a string of top-five hits with "My Hang-Up Is You" (six weeks at number one in 1972), "Bless Your Heart" (number one in 1972), "Got the All Overs For You (All Over Me)" (number one in 1972), "If You Can't Feel It (It Ain't There)" (1973), "Super Kind of Woman" (number one in 1973), "Trip to Heaven" (No. 1 in 1973), "Hang In There Girl" (1974), "The Want-To's" (1974), "My Woman's Man" (1975), "The First Time" (1975), "I'd Like To Sleep Till I Get Over You" (1975) and "The Warm Side of You" (1975). He has been called by many fans as "the Heart and Soul of Country Music".

With the success of "Easy Loving" and other songs he wrote, plus a popular concert attraction on the road, Hart became independently wealthy and owned a songwriting company, a school for the blind, a trucking company, and a chain of martial arts studios—his hobby was as a master of karate.

=== Late 1970s–1980s ===
By 1976, Hart continued to have major hits, although now his streak of top 10s was replaced by a streak of top-20 and top-30 hits. These included "You Are the Song Inside of Me" (1976), "That Look in Her Eyes" (1976), "Thank God She's Mine" (1977), "The Pleasure's Been All Mine" (1977), "Toe to Toe" (1978), and "Wasn't It Easy Baby" (1979). His last top-10 hit came with "Why Lovers Turn to Strangers" in 1977, which peaked at number eight. This song was written by Idaho-based composer Bobby Fender.

In 1980, Hart signed with Sunbird Records and immediately scored a top-20 hit with "Sure Thing" that year. He followed this up with three top-40 hits in 1981. This ended his days as a major country artist. In 1985 and 1987, he had a couple of minor hits on El Dorado and 5th Avenue Records, with his last hit being "The Best Love I Never Had" in 1987 peaking at number 77.

=== Later years and death ===
In 2001, Hart was inducted into the Alabama Music Hall of Fame. A few years later, Phenix City declared a major east–west street Freddie Hart Parkway in his honor.

Hart released a handful of new albums on CDs, showcasing his passion for gospel music, patriotism, and the traditional country sound that originally made him famous. These albums prompted him to selectively tour and perform concerts around the world. Hart retained a large following in Europe and the U.S., performing at music festivals, universities, churches, and industry events.

Hart continued to write and record gospel music during the 2000s. He received numerous awards and had several number-one songs in the gospel field. In 2004, he was inducted into the Nashville Songwriter's Hall of Fame. In 2017, he performed in Pigeon Forge, Tennessee, and received the Hall of Fame award from the North American Country Music Associations International. His final performance was in March 2018 on the Ernest Tubb Midnite Jamboree as a special guest of David Frizzell's. Hart sang a new song he had written and just recorded about Lefty Frizzell, titled simply "Lefty". In April 2018, Hart recorded his final album, titled God Bless You. The project, produced by David Frizzell, contains 11 newly written gospel songs and a remake of his signature song "Easy Loving". The album was released in late 2018.

Hart died as a result of pneumonia on October 27, 2018, in Burbank, California.

== Discography ==
=== Albums ===
Year	Album	Chart positions		RIAA	Label
Year	Album	US Country	US	RIAA	Label
1962	The Spirited Freddie Hart				Columbia
1966	The Hart of Country Music	19			Kapp
1966	Straight from the Heart				Kapp
1967	A Hurtin' Man				Kapp
1967	The Neon and the Rain				Kapp
1968	Togetherness	32			Kapp
1968	Born a Fool	35			Kapp
1969	Greatest Hits				Kapp
1970	New Sounds				Capitol
1971	California Grapevine	23			Capitol
1971	Easy Loving^{A}	1	37	Gold	Capitol
1972	My Hang-Up Is You	2	89		Capitol
1972	Bless Your Heart	3	93		Capitol
1972	The World of Freddie Hart	37			Columbia
1972	Got the All Overs for You	1			Capitol
1973	Super Kind of Woman	1			Capitol
1973	Trip to Heaven	5	188		Capitol
1973	If You Can't Feel It (It Ain't There)	8			Capitol
1974	Hang in there Girl	6			Capitol
1974	Country Heart 'N Soul	14			Capitol
1975	Freddie Hart's Greatest Hits	9			Capitol
1975	Presents the Heartbeats				Capitol
1975	The First Time	14			Capitol
1976	People Put to Music	20			Capitol
1976	That Look in Her Eyes	44			Capitol
1977	The Pleasure's Been All Mine	44			Capitol
1978	Only You				Capitol
1979	My Lady				Capitol
1980	A Sure Thing	52			Sunbird

- ^{A}Easy Loving also peaked at No. 67 on the RPM Top Albums chart.

=== Singles ===
Year	Single	Chart positions		Album
Year	Single	US Country	CAN Country	Album
1953	"Butterfly Love"			singles only
1953	"My Heart Is a Play Ground"			singles only
1954	"Loose Talk"			singles only
1954	"Caught at Last"			singles only
1954	"Please Don't Tell Her"			singles only
1955	"Miss Lonely Heart"			singles only
1955	"No Thanks to You"			singles only
1955	"Hiding in the Darkness"			singles only
1956	"Dig Boy Dig"			singles only
1956	"Snatch It and Grab It"			singles only
1956	"Drink Up and Go Home"			The Spirited Freddie Hart
1957	"On the Prowl" (w/ Brenda Lee)			single only
1957	"Fraulein"			The Spirited Freddie Hart
1957	"Say No More"			singles only
1957	"Heaven Only Knows"			singles only
1958	"I Won't Be Home Tonight"			singles only
1958	"I'm No Angel"			The Spirited Freddie Hart
1959	"The Wall"	24		The Spirited Freddie Hart
1959	"Chain Gang"	17		The Spirited Freddie Hart
1960	"The Key's in the Mailbox"	18		The Spirited Freddie Hart
1961	"Lying Again"	27		single only
1961	"What a Laugh!"	23		The Spirited Freddie Hart
1962	"Like You Are"			singles only
1962	"Stand Up"			singles only
1963	"I'll Hit It with a Stick"			singles only
1963	"Angels Like You"			singles only
1963	"For a Second Time"			singles only
1964	"First You Go Through Me"			singles only
1964	"Hurt Feels So Good"			The Hart of Country Music
1965	"You've Got It Coming to You"			The Hart of Country Music
1965	"Hank Williams' Guitar" (w/ The Heartbeats)	23		The Hart of Country Music
1966	"Why Should I Cry Over You" (w/ The Heartbeats)	45		The Hart of Country Music
1966	"Together Again"			Straight from the Heart
1966	"Misty Blue"			A Hurtin' Man
1967	"I'll Hold You in My Heart"	63		A Hurtin' Man
1967	"Neon and the Rain"			The Neon and the Rain
1968	"Togetherness"	24	13	Togetherness
1968	"Born a Fool"	21	8	Born a Fool
1968	"Don't Cry Baby"	70		singles only
1969	"Why Leave Something I Can't Use"			singles only
1969	"I Lost All My Tomorrows"			singles only
1970	"The Whole World Holding Hands"	27		New Sounds
1970	"One More Mountain to Climb"	48		New Sounds
1970	"Fingerprints"	41		New Sounds
1970	"California Grapevine"	68		California Grapevine
1971	"Easy Loving"^{A}	1	1	California Grapevine
1972	"My Hang-Up Is You"	1	1	My Hang-Up Is You
1972	"Bless Your Heart"	1	4	Bless Your Heart
1972	"Got the All Overs for You (All Over Me)"	1	1	Got the All Overs for You
1973	"Super Kind of Woman"	1	1	Super Kind of Woman
1973	"Born a Fool" (re-release)	41	32	Born a Fool
1973	"Trip to Heaven"	1	1	Trip to Heaven
1973	"If You Can't Feel It (It Ain't There)"	3	5	If You Can't Feel It (It Ain't There)
1974	"Hang in There Girl"	2		Hang in there Girl
1974	"The Want-To's"	3	3	Hang in there Girl
1974	"My Woman's Man"	3	2	Country Heart 'N Soul
1975	"I'd Like to Sleep Til I Get Over You"	5	20	Country Heart 'N Soul
1975	"The First Time"	2	1	The First Time
1975	"Warm Side of You"	6	3	The First Time
1976	"You Are the Song (Inside of Me)"	11	1	The First Time
1976	"She'll Throw Stones at You"	12	6	People Put to Music
1976	"That Look in Her Eyes"	11		That Look in Her Eyes
1977	"Why Lovers Turn to Strangers"	8	3	That Look in Her Eyes
1977	"Thank God She's Mine"	11	4	The Pleasure's Been All Mine
1977	"The Pleasure's Been All Mine"	13	23	The Pleasure's Been All Mine
1977	"It's Heaven Loving You"	flip		The Pleasure's Been All Mine
1977	"The Search" (w/ The Heartbeats)	43		The Pleasure's Been All Mine
1978	"So Good, So Rare, So Fine"	27	32	Only You
1978	"Only You"	34		Only You
1978	"Toe to Toe"	21	35	My Lady
1979	"My Lady"	40	53	My Lady
1979	"Wasn't It Easy Baby"	28	57	My Lady
1980	"Sure Thing"	15		A Sure Thing
1980	"Roses Are Red"	33		A Sure Thing
1981	"You're Crazy Man"	31		A Sure Thing
1981	"You Were There"	38		singles only
1985	"I Don't Want to Lose You"	81		singles only
1987	"Best Love I Never Had"	77		singles only

- ^{A}"Easy Loving" also peaked at No. 17 on the Billboard Hot 100, No. 31 on the Canadian RPM Adult Contemporary Tracks chart and No. 21 on the RPM Top Singles chart.

== The Heartbeats ==
Freddie Hart first used the name Heartbeats, a play on his last name, as his backing on a one-off 1967 album credited to Freddie Hart and the Heartbeats, but after his hit "Easy Loving" in 1971, ten studio albums were released between 1972 and 1977 credited to Freddie Hart and the Heartbeats. Various musicians performed in the Heartbeats over the years, including Bobby Wayne and Dennis Hromek, both of whom would go on to join the Strangers. During their heyday in the mid-1970s, the Heartbeats even released one studio album credited to just themselves in 1975.

== Awards and nominations ==
=== Grammy Awards ===
Year	Nominee / work	Award	Result
1972	"Easy Loving"	Best Country Vocal Performance, Male	Nominated
1972	"Easy Loving"	Best Country Song	Nominated

=== Academy of Country Music Awards ===
Year	Nominee / work	Award	Result
1966	Freddie Hart	Top Male Vocalist of the Year	Nominated
1972	Freddie Hart	Top Male Vocalist of the Year	Won
1972	Freddie Hart	Entertainer of the Year	Won
1972	Easy Loving	Album of the Year	Won
1972	"Easy Loving"	Single Record of the Year	Won
1972	"Easy Loving"	Song of the Year	Won
1973	"Bless Your Heart"	Song of the Year	Nominated
1973	Freddie Hart	Entertainer of the Year	Nominated
1973	Freddie Hart	Top Male Vocalist of the Year	Nominated
1973	Bless Your Heart	Album of the Year	Nominated

=== Country Music Association Awards ===
Year	Nominee / work	Award	Result
1971	"Easy Loving"	Single of the Year	Nominated
1971	"Easy Loving"	Song of the Year	Won
1972	"Easy Loving"	Song of the Year	Won
1972	Freddie Hart	Male Vocalist of the Year	Nominated
1972	Freddie Hart	Entertainer of the Year	Nominated

== Bibliography ==
- Cusic, Don. "Freddie Hart". In The Encyclopedia of Country Music (1998). Paul Kingsbury, Editor. New York: Oxford University Press. pp. 230–1.
