= Bless Your Heart (song) =

Single by Freddie Hart

from the album Bless Your Heart
- B-side: "Conscience Makes Cowards (Of Us All)"
- Released: June 1972 (U.S.)
- Recorded: April 11, 1972
- Genre: Country
- Length: 1:56
- Label: Capitol 3353
- Songwriter(s): Freddie Hart, Jack Lebsock
- Producer(s): Earl Ball

Freddie Hart singles chronology
| "My Hang-Up Is You" (1972) | "Bless Your Heart" (1972) | "Got the All-Overs For You" (1972) |

"Bless Your Heart" is a song made famous by country music singer Freddie Hart, and was the title track to Hart's 1972 album. The song was his third No. 1 song on the country chart.

Country music writer Tom Roland wrote that the homonymy of Hart's last name ("Hart" and "heart") and the use of a common phrase ("bless your heart") in the lyrics provided the basis for the song, which is about a man who - despite his failings and feelings of unworthiness - expresses deep gratitude that his wife still loves him. As the song grew in popularity, wrote Roland, Hart's fans "began saying it more and more in conjunction with (Hart) on stage."

== Charts ==
| Chart (1972) | Peak position |
|---|---|
| U.S. Billboard Hot Country Singles | 1 |
| Canadian RPM Country Tracks | 4 |

== See also ==
- Allmusic — Bless Your Heart
