= Easy Loving =

Single by Freddie Hart

from the album California Grapevine
- B-side: "Brother Bluebird"
- Released: July 1971 (U.S.)
- Recorded: 1970
- Genre: Country
- Length: 2:29
- Label: Capitol 3115
- Songwriter(s): Freddie Hart
- Producer(s): George Richey

Freddie Hart singles chronology
"California Grapevine" (1971)	"Easy Loving" (1971)	"My Hang-Up Is You" (1972)

"Easy Loving" is a song composed by country music singer-songwriter Freddie Hart. Released in the summer of 1971, it became Hart's breakthrough hit and a country music standard.

== Song history ==
Hart, a country music stalwart since the late 1950s, had a string of minor hits for several labels, including Kapp, Columbia and his then-current label, Capitol. However, his hits were modest at best.

"Easy Loving," about deep commitment in a monogamous relationship, very nearly did not become a hit. Hart's previous single, "California Grapevine," had stalled at No. 68 on the Billboard Hot Country Singles chart, and Capitol Records decided to drop Hart's contract.

In mid-1971, a disc jockey at Atlanta, Georgia radio station WPLO began playing "Easy Loving" to great response. The song quickly caught on nationwide, and by that August, "Easy Loving" had broken into the top 10 of the Billboard Hot Country Singles chart. On September 11, it became his first No. 1 song, spending three weeks atop the chart (interrupted between its first and second weeks by Tom T. Hall's "The Year Clayton Delaney Died.").

"Easy Loving" also was a modest pop hit, reaching No. 17 on the Billboard Hot 100 in the fall of 1971, and was the only pop hit of Hart's career.

== Awards ==
The success of "Easy Loving" won Hart numerous awards. For instance, during the 1972 Academy of Country Music Awards, he was named Top Male Vocalist and Entertainer of the Year, plus Single and Song of the Year; the album from which it came, Easy Loving, won the ACM's award that year, too.

The Country Music Association bestowed Song of the Year honors upon "Easy Loving" in both 1971 and 1972.

"Easy Loving" was certified gold for sales of 1 million units by the Recording Industry Association of America, and was the No. 1 song of 1971 on Billboard's Hot Country Singles chart.

In addition to all of its awards and honors, "Easy Loving" sparked Hart's flagging career. After quickly being re-signed by Capitol Records, Hart went on to score five more consecutive No. 1 hits on the Billboard Hot Country Singles chart during the next two years, plus scored more than a dozen more top 10 hits through 1977.

== Chart performance ==
=== Weekly charts ===
Chart (1971)	Peak position
Australian (Kent Music Report)	25
U.S. Billboard Hot Country Singles	1
U.S. Billboard Hot 100	17
U.S. Billboard Adult Contemporary	28
U.S. Cash Box Top 100	12
Canadian RPM Country Tracks	1
Canadian RPM Top Singles	21
Canadian RPM Adult Contemporary Tracks	31

=== Year-end charts ===
Chart (1971)	Rank
U.S. Country (Billboard)	1
U.S. Billboard Hot 100	68

== Bibliography ==
- Millard, Bob. Country Music: 70 Years of America's Favorite Music (1993). New York: HarperCollins. (ISBN 0-06-273244-7)
- Roland, Tom. The Billboard Book of Number One Country Hits (1991). New York: Billboard Books, Watson-Guptill Publications. (ISBN 0-82-307553-2)
