= Donna Fargo discography =

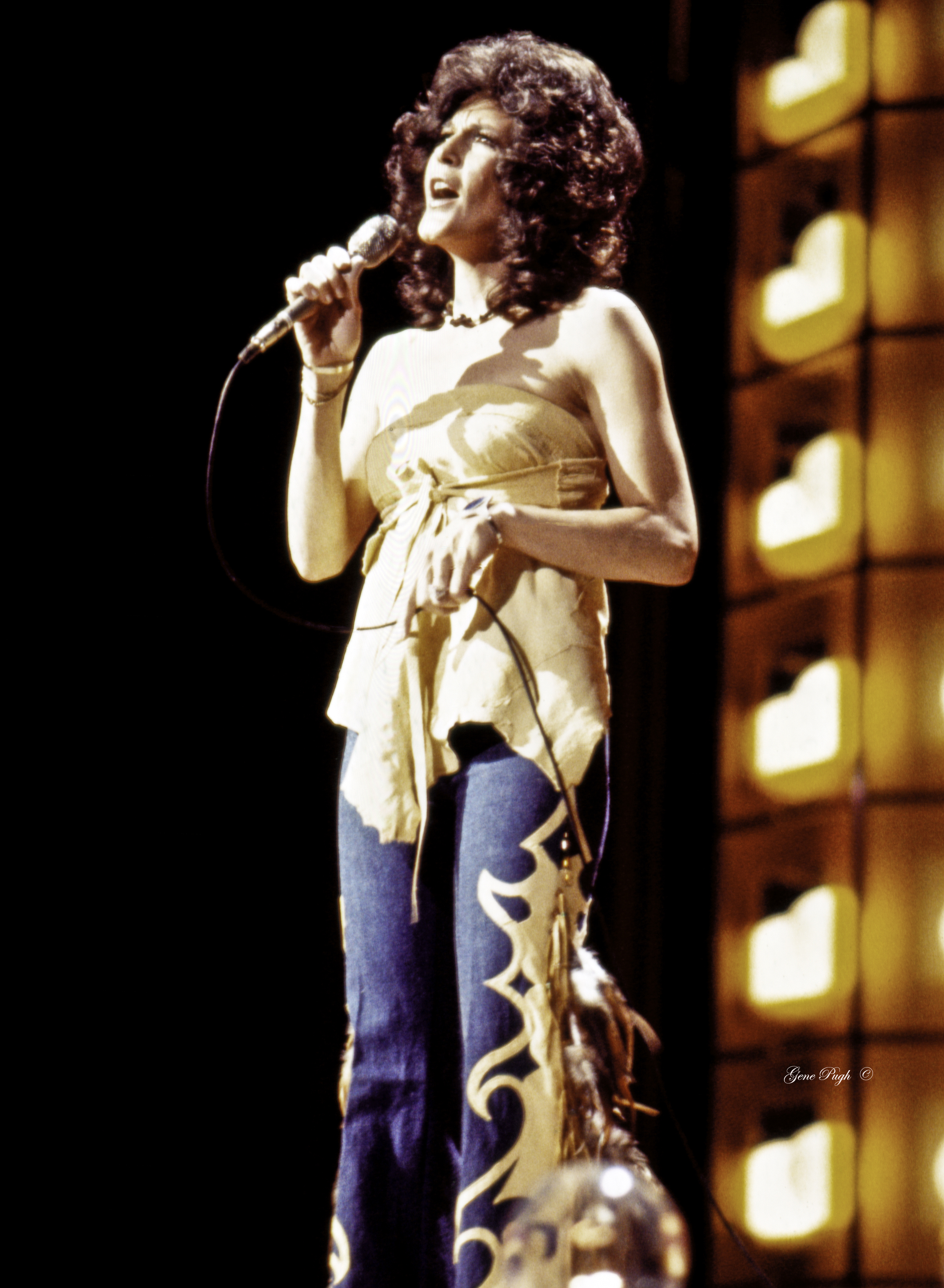
- Fargo performing in 1978
- Studio albums: 15
- Compilation albums: 4
- Singles: 47
- No. 1 Singles: 6

This article presents the discography of American country music singer-songwriter, Donna Fargo. Since 1972, Fargo has released 15 studio albums, one of which was certified Gold by the RIAA. She has also released 47 singles, 6 of which went to Number One on the Billboard Hot Country Singles chart.

== Studio albums ==
=== 1970s ===
Title	Details	Peak chart positions				Certifications (sales threshold)
Title	Details	US Country	US	AUS	CAN	Certifications (sales threshold)
The Happiest Girl in the Whole U.S.A.	Release date: May 1972; Label: Dot Records	1	47	24	67	US: Gold
My Second Album	Release date: February 1973; Label: Dot Records	1	104	—	36	
All About a Feeling	Release date: October 1973; Label: Dot Records	5	204	—	—	
Miss Donna Fargo	Release date: 1974; Label: Dot Records	4	207	—	—	
Whatever I Say Means I Love You	Release date: July 1975; Label: Dot Records	28	—	—	—	
On the Move	Release date: 1976; Label: Warner Bros. Records	31	—	—	—	
Fargo Country	Release date: 1977; Label: Warner Bros. Records	11	—	—	—	
Shame on Me	Release date: 1977; Label: Warner Bros. Records	18	—	—	—	
Dark-Eyed Lady	Release date: 1978; Label: Warner Bros. Records	20	—	—	—	
Just for You^{[A]}	Release date: 1979; Label: Warner Bros. Records	—	—	—	—	
"—" denotes releases that did not chart

=== 1980s ===
Title	Details	Peak positions
Title	Details	US Country
Fargo	Release date: 1980; Label: Warner Bros. Records	—
Brotherly Love	Release date: 1981; Label: MCA Records/Songbird	—
Donna	Release date: 1983; Label: RCA Victor	—
Encore	Release date: 1984; Label: 51 West	—
Winners	Release date: 1986; Label: Mercury Records	50
"—" denotes releases that did not chart

== Compilation albums ==
Title	Details	Peak positions
Title	Details	US Country
The Best of Donna Fargo	Release date: 1977; Label: Dot Records	9
The Best of Donna Fargo	Release date: 1995; Label: Varese Vintage	—
Best of Donna Fargo	Release date: July 8, 1997; Label: Curb Records	—
20th Century Masters: The Millennium Collection	Release date: January 8, 2002; Label: MCA Records	—
That Was Yesterday	Release date: October 21, 2016; Label: Varèse Sarabande	—
"—" denotes releases that did not chart

== Singles ==
=== 1960s — 1970s ===
Year	Title	Peak positions							Album
Year	Title	US Country	US	US AC	AUS	CAN Country	CAN	CAN AC	Album
1967	"Would You Believe a Lifetime"	—	—	—	—	—	—	—	—N/a
1967	"You Reach for the Bottle"	—	—	—	—	—	—	—	—N/a
1967	"Kinda Glad I'm Me"	—	—	—	—	—	—	—	—N/a
1968	"Daddy"	—	—	—	—	—	—	—	—N/a
1969	"Wishful Thinkin'"	—	—	—	—	—	—	—	—N/a
1972	"The Happiest Girl in the Whole U.S.A."	1	11	7	3	16	—	—	The Happiest Girl in the Whole U.S.A.
1972	"Funny Face"	1	5	5	2	1	17	—	The Happiest Girl in the Whole U.S.A.
1972	"Superman"	1	41	35	72	1	75	—	My Second Album
1973	"You Were Always There"	1	93	47	—	1	—	37	My Second Album
1973	"Little Girl Gone"	2	57	43	—	2	—	55	All About Feeling
1974	"I'll Try a Little Bit Harder"	6	—	—	—	—	—	—	All About Feeling
1974	"You Can't Be a Beacon If Your Light Don't Shine"	1	57	14	70	1	41	15	Miss Donna Fargo
1974	"US of A"	9	86	—	—	—	—	—	Miss Donna Fargo
1975	"It Do Feel Good"	7	98	—	—	12	—	—	Miss Donna Fargo
1975	"Hello Little Bluebird"	14	—	—	—	8	—	—	Whatever I Say Means I Love You
1975	"Whatever I Say (Means I Love You)"	38	—	—	—	—	—	—	Whatever I Say Means I Love You
1975	"What Will the New Year Bring"	58	—	—	—	—	—	—	Whatever I Say Means I Love You
1976	"You're Not Charlie Brown"	60	—	—	—	—	—	—	Whatever I Say Means I Love You
1976	"Mr. Doodles"	20	—	—	—	40	—	—	On the Move
1976	"I've Loved You All of the Way"	15	—	—	—	—	—	—	On the Move
1976	"Don't Be Angry"	3	—	—	—	10	—	—	The Best of Donna Fargo
1976	"Mockingbird Hill"	9	—	—	—	6	—	—	Fargo Country
1977	"I'd Love You to Want Me"	—	—	—	—	—	—	—	The Best of Donna Fargo
1977	"That Was Yesterday"	1	—	—	—	1	—	—	Fargo Country
1977	"Shame on Me"	8	—	—	—	17	—	—	Shame on Me
1977	"Do I Love You (Yes in Every Way)"	2	—	45	—	1	—	—	Shame on Me
1978	"Raga Muffin Man"	19	—	—	—	21	—	40	Shame on Me
1978	"Another Goodbye"	10	—	—	—	8	—	—	Dark-Eyed Lady
1978	"Somebody Special"	6	—	—	—	5	—	—	Dark-Eyed Lady
1979	"Daddy" (re-recording)	14	—	—	—	25	—	—	Just for You
1979	"Preacher Berry"	45	—	—	—	—	—	—	Just for You
"—" denotes releases that did not chart

=== 1980s — 2000s ===
Year	Title	Peak positions		Album
Year	Title	US Country	CAN Country	Album
1980	"Walk on By"	43	53	Just for You
1980	"Land of Cotton"	63	—	Fargo
1980	"Seeing Is Believing"	55	—	Fargo
1981	"Lone Star Cowboy"	73	—	—N/a
1981	"Jacamo"	72	—	—N/a
1981	"The Baptism of Jesse Taylor"	—	—	Brotherly Love
1981	"Say I Do"	—	—	Brotherly Love
1982	"It's Hard to Be the Dreamer (When I Used to Be the Dream)"	40	41	Donna
1982	"Did We Have to Go This Far (To Say Goodbye)"	80	—	Donna
1983	"The Sign of the Times"	72	—	—N/a
1984	"My Heart Will Always Belong to You"	80	—	—N/a
1986	"Woman of the 80's"	58	—	Winners
1986	"Me and You"	29	—	Winners
1987	"Members Only" (with Billy Joe Royal)	23	—	Winners
1991	"Soldier Boy"	71	—	—N/a
2008	"We Can Do Better in America"	—	—	—N/a
"—" denotes releases that did not chart

== Notes ==
- A Just for You also peaked at number 9 on the Canadian RPM Country Albums/CDs chart
