= George Vaughn Horton =

American songwriter and performer (1911–1988)

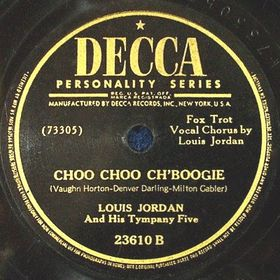
"Choo Choo Ch'Boogie" was one of Horton's early songwriting successes

George Vaughn Horton (June 5, 1911 – February 29, 1988) was an American songwriter and performer. Usually credited as "Vaughn Horton" or "George Vaughn," he wrote or contributed to the success of several popular songs, including "Choo Choo Ch'Boogie," "Hillbilly Fever," "Sugar-Foot Rag," "Mockin' Bird Hill," and the Christmas song "Jolly Old Saint Nicholas."

== Early life and education ==
Vaughn Horton and his brother, Roy Horton, were the sons of coal miner Scott George Horton (1885–1950) and his wife, Eunice Waite Horton (1884–1966). They grew up in Huntingdon County, located in the Allegheny Mountains of south-central Pennsylvania, initially in Broad Top Township and later in the small community of Wood. Vaughn graduated from nearby Robertsdale High School.

Vaughn, a guitarist, and Roy, a fiddler, began their music careers by performing country music at roadhouses along the nearby Lincoln Highway, the nation's first transcontinental highway, which ran through Pennsylvania. After briefly attending Pennsylvania State University, Vaughn and Roy left in November 1934 to move to Philadelphia. A year later, they relocated to New York City, where they found work singing country music on the radio, including an appearance on The Fleischmann's Yeast Hour.

Vaughn later transitioned into record production, participated in recording sessions, and focused on songwriting.

== The Pinetoppers ==
In New York, Vaughn and Roy Horton formed a "hillbilly band" called the Pinetoppers, with Vaughn serving as the leader and chief composer/songwriter. The Pinetoppers occasionally backed other Coral Records artists on recordings, including Ray Smith, Bill Darnel, and Kenny Roberts. They also worked as an independent act.

The Pinetoppers achieved three charting records in 1951. These included their version of Vaughn Horton's "Mockin' Bird Hill" (No. 10 on the US charts, No. 3 on the country charts), another Horton composition, "Metro Polka" (No. 12 on the country charts), and Cy Coben's "Lonely Little Robin" (No. 14 on the US charts, No. 11 on the country charts). The latter song also featured collaborations with Ray Smith and the Marlin Sisters.

The Pinetoppers released three albums on Coral Records: As Introduced by the Pinetoppers (1950), The Pinetoppers (1956), and Square Dances (Without Calls) (10"; release date unknown). Additionally, they released numerous singles between 1947 and 1956.

== Songwriting ==
Horton's first songwriting credit may have been for "Never Trust a Man," released by Judy Canova in 1939. Another early credit was "Care of Uncle Sam" (1942), a war-themed song co-written with New York-based country singer Denver Darling and released as a B-side by Darling. Denver Darling became a frequent collaborator with Horton.

Darling and Horton wrote "Don't Hang Around Me Anymore," which Gene Autry recorded and took to No. 4 on the country charts in 1945. Another song by Darling and Horton, with an additional writing credit for producer Milt Gabler, was "Choo Choo Ch'Boogie." It was recorded by bandleader Louis Jordan and his Tympany Five in January 1946 and topped the R&B charts for 18 weeks starting in August 1946.

In 1947, the Sons of the Pioneers recorded Horton's "Teardrops in My Heart" and took it to No. 4 on the country charts. The song became a standard and was later recorded by many other artists, including Theresa Brewer (1957), Joe Barry (1961), Rex Allen Jr. (1976), and Marty Robbins (1981).

In 1948, Horton wrote English lyrics for Artur Beul's 1944 song "Nach em Räge schint Sunne," renaming it "Toolie Oolie Doolie (The Yodel Polka)." The Andrews Sisters' version became a hit, reaching No. 3 on the national charts. Horton's own version, performed by Vaughn Horton and His Polka Debs, charted at No. 11, as did a version by The Sportsmen. Additionally, versions by the Marlin Sisters and bandleader Henri René both reached No. 30.

In 1949, versions of Horton's "Till the End of the World" charted on the country charts for three different artists: Jimmy Wakely (No. 9), Ernest Tubb (No. 4), and Johnny Bond (No. 12). Bing Crosby's 1952 version reached No. 16 on the popular charts and No. 10 on the country charts.

Horton also collaborated with Hank Garland on "Sugar-Foot Rag", which sold over a million copies for Garland. A 1979 recording of the song by Jimmie Reed also charted. In the same year, Russ Morgan took Horton's "Barroom Polka" to No. 20 on the pop charts.

Horton's "Hillbilly Fever", a song reflecting on the growing popularity of country music, became a hit for Little Jimmie Dickens in 1950. A slightly revised version, "Hillbilly Fever No. 2," was also highly successful, performed by Ernest Tubb and Red Foley.

A 1950 composition by Horton and Vasil Crlenica called "Tamburitza Boogie" was picked up by Louis Jordan, who took it to #20 on the R&B chart.

Horton is often credited alongside Jimmie Rodgers for "Mule Skinner Blues." His contribution was to modernize the lyrics in 1950, which Bill Monroe recorded as "The New Mule-Skinner Blues." However, Monroe apparently continued to use the original lyrics in concert.

Another of Horton's revisions was the Christmas song "Jolly Old Saint Nicholas." He re-arranged the original verses and added new ones for a 1949 recording by Ray Smith, though many artists continued to use the older lyrics. On the B-side of Ray Smith's single of "Jolly Old Saint Nicholas" was "An Old Christmas Card," another Horton-penned Christmas song that achieved some success. For example, Jim Reeves included it on his popular 1963 Christmas album Twelve Songs of Christmas.

Horton's last major hit was "Mockin' Bird Hill" in 1951. Horton added lyrics to an old Swedish waltz by accordionist Calle Jularbo. The song was first recorded by Les Paul and Mary Ford, followed by Patti Page, with both versions reaching No. 2 on the charts. In addition to the Pinetoppers' version, renditions by Russ Morgan and Rosalie Allen & Elton Britt also charted.

In 1977, Donna Fargo revived the song, taking it back to No. 9 on the country charts. The song even charted in Britain, reaching No. 10 with a 1964 version by The Migil Five.

A minor hit in 1951 was "Metro Polka," a tune credited to Horton and Willie Evans. While the Pinetoppers charted it on the country charts, Frankie Laine took it to No. 19 on the pop charts. Another notable song was "Come What May," written in 1951 but popularized in 1952 by Patti Page, who reached No. 9 on the Billboard charts with it.

After 1951, Horton continued to write and perform, but with less commercial success. In 1954, Horton co-wrote "The Honeymoon's Over" with Sammy Mysels and Charles McCarthy, and the version by Betty Hutton and Tennessee Ernie Ford reached No. 16 on the pop charts. Horton also rewrote the lyrics to "Wabash Cannonball" to create "Big Wheel Cannonball," a trucking song that charted for Dick Todd (1967) and Dick Curless (1970). On the same 1970 album, Curless also recorded Horton's "Drag 'Em Off the Interstate, Sock It to 'Em, J.P. Blues," which reached No. 29 on the country charts.

In 1968, veteran country singer Elton Britt had a minor hit (No. 26 country) with Horton's "The Jimmie Rodgers Blues." In 1972, Roy Clark recorded Horton's novelty commentary on changes in network television, "The Lawrence Welk-Hee Haw Counter-Revolution Polka," which reached No. 9 on the Billboard Hot Country Singles chart. In 1973, Dick Curless charted one more Horton country novelty, "Chick Inspector (That's Where My Money Goes)," which reached No. 54.

Horton was elected to the Nashville Songwriters Hall of Fame in 1971. He appeared on the episode of Hee Haw broadcast on February 25, 1984.

== Personal life and death ==
On June 5, 1932, Horton married Margaret Beatrice "Sue" Mellott (1914–1986). They had seven children—six sons and a daughter—of whom George Vaughn Horton Jr. (1932–2011) was the oldest.

Vaughn Horton died in New Port Richey, Florida, on February 29, 1988, at the age of 76.
