= Do I Love You =

Do I Love You may refer to:

- "Do I Love You?", 1939 song by Cole Porter, from the musical Du Barry Was a Lady
- "Do I Love You (Indeed I Do)", by Frank Wilson
- "Do I Love You?" (The Ronettes song), a 1964 single
- "Do I Love You (Yes in Every Way)", 1971 song by Paul Anka, from a French song popularized by Claude François (1977 cover by Donna Fargo)
