= The Happiest Girl in the Whole U.S.A. =

The Happiest Girl in the Whole U.S.A. may refer to:

- The Happiest Girl in the Whole U.S.A. (album), a 1972 album by Donna Fargo
- "The Happiest Girl in the Whole U.S.A." (song), a 1972 single by Donna Fargo
