= Jolly Old Saint Nicholas =

Christmas song

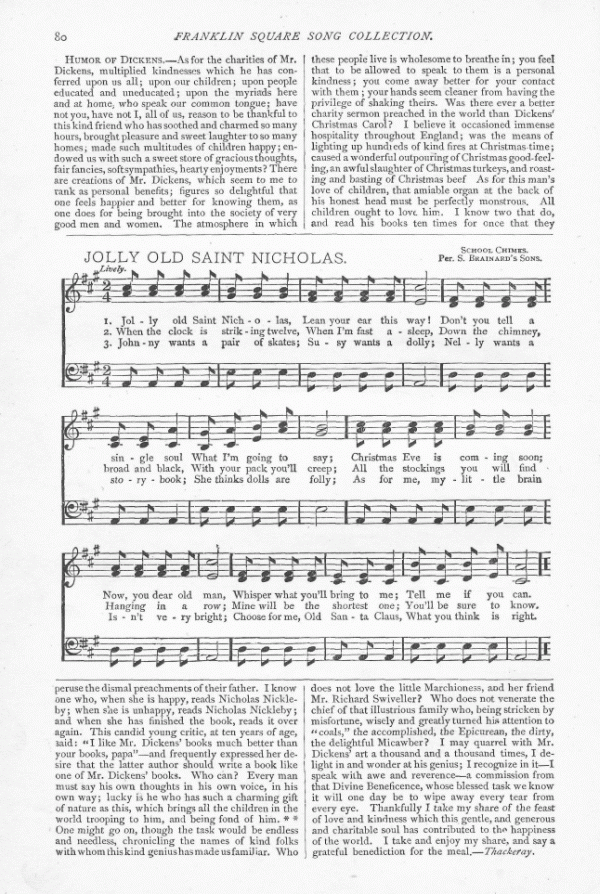
A 19th-century printing of the standard words and music of this song, appearing in Franklin Square Song Collection, No. 1, which was published in 1881 by John Piersol McCaskey.

"Jolly Old Saint Nicholas" is a Christmas song that originated with a poem by Emily Huntington Miller (1833–1913), published as "Lilly's Secret" in The Little Corporal Magazine in December 1865. The song's lyrics have also been attributed to Benjamin Hanby, who wrote a similar song in the 1860s, Up on the Housetop. However, the lyrics now in common use closely resemble Miller's 1865 poem. Some people have also attributed the lyrics to John Piersol McCaskey—a song editor and publisher, among other things, at the time. His great-great grandson said McCaskey wrote the song in 1867, and that the "Johnny" mentioned in the song who wants a pair of skates was McCaskey's late son, John, who died as a child. However, there is no known evidence for this. McCaskey's own published 1881 book, Franklin Square Song Collection No. 1, a book in which proper attribution is given to songs' lyricists and composers, does not list himself as having had anything to do with the song.

The music is generally believed to have been written by James R. Murray. The first publication of the music was in 1874 in School Chimes, A New School Music Book by S. Brainard's Sons, and attributes the music to him. The 1881 publication by McCaskey gives attribution to the S. Brainard's Sons publication, which would mean Murray.

Notable recordings include those by Ray Smith in 1949, Captain Stubby and the Buccaneers in 1949, Chet Atkins in 1961, Eddy Arnold in 1962, Alvin and the Chipmunks in 1963, Andy Williams in 1995, Anne Murray in 2001, and Carole King in 2017.

The Ray Smith 1949 version was revised and rearranged by, and had additional lyrics credited to, songwriter Vaughn Horton. This version was also used for a single release by the Ames Brothers in 1951 and by Wilf Carter for his 1965 Christmas in Canada album.

Ray Conniff's version of the song, featured on his 1962 album We Wish You a Merry Christmas, helped propel the album to platinum status, one of two platinum albums in Conniff's career.

== Lyrics ==
This is the original published song in 1881:

Jolly old Saint Nicholas,
Lean your ear this way;
Don't you tell a single soul
What I'm going to say,
Christmas Eve is coming soon;
Now you dear old man,
Whisper what you'll bring to me;
Tell me if you can.
When the clock is striking twelve,
When I'm fast asleep,
Down the chimney broad and black
With your pack you'll creep;
All the stockings you will find
Hanging in a row;
Mine will be the shortest one;
You'll be sure to know.
Johnny wants a pair of skates;
Susy wants a dolly;
Nellie wants a story book,
She thinks dolls are folly.
As for me, my little brain
Isn't very bright;
Choose for me, dear Santa Claus,
What you think is right.

In the Ray Conniff version as part of a medley with The Little Drummer Boy; the list of wishes is changed to "Johnny wants a pair of skates, Susy wants a sled, Nellie wants a picture book, yellow, blue and red." The final lyrics are also changed as a child named Billy is mentioned and that Santa should give him a drum cause "he likes that best." The song then transitions into Little Drummer Boy which is similar to the Harry Simeone Chorale recording. Certain radio stations that do all Christmas radio have split the medley into two different song tracks thanks to a brief pause in the middle of the medley.

Some versions change Coniff's last line to "Nellie wants a story book, one she hasn't read," to counter accusations that Coniff made her illiterate. The Chipmunks' version takes Coniff's version and inserts the names Alvin, Simon and Theodore.

== See also ==
- Santa Claus
- Christmas gift-bringers around the world
- List of Christmas carols
