= On the Move =

On the Move may refer to:

- On the Move (TV series), a 1975–1976 BBC television series
- On the Move (Donna Fargo album), a 1976 album by American country artist Donna Fargo
- On the Move (Bob Mover album), a 1978 album by American jazz artist Bob Mover
- On the Move (Nat Adderley album), a 1983 album by American jazz artist Nat Adderley
- "On the Move" (Barney & Friends)
- "On the Move", a 2001 single by Bart Claessen (Barthezz)
- "On the Move", a song by Mudvayne from By the People, for the People
- On the Move: A Life, the 2015 autobiography of Oliver Sacks
- On the Move (film), 1978 film by Adolf Winkelmann
