= Southern Lady =

Southern Lady may refer to:

== Songs ==
- "Southern Lady", by Doc Watson, from the album Doc and the Boys
- "Southern Lady", by Donna Fargo, from the album On the Move
- "Southern Lady", by Jimmy Harnen, from the album Can't Fight the Midnight
- "Southern Lady", by Joe Cocker, from the album Luxury You Can Afford
- "Southern Lady", by Rita Coolidge, from the album Anytime...Anywhere
