= Kay Adams =

Kay Adams may refer to:

- Kay Adams (singer) (born 1941), American country singer
- Kay Adams Corleone, fictional character in The Godfather
- Kay Adams (sportscaster) (born 1986), American former host of the NFL Network's Good Morning Football
- Kay Adams (curler) (born 1987), Scottish curler

== See also ==
- Kaye Adams (born 1962), Scottish television presenter
