= The Little Pilgrim =

American children's magazine

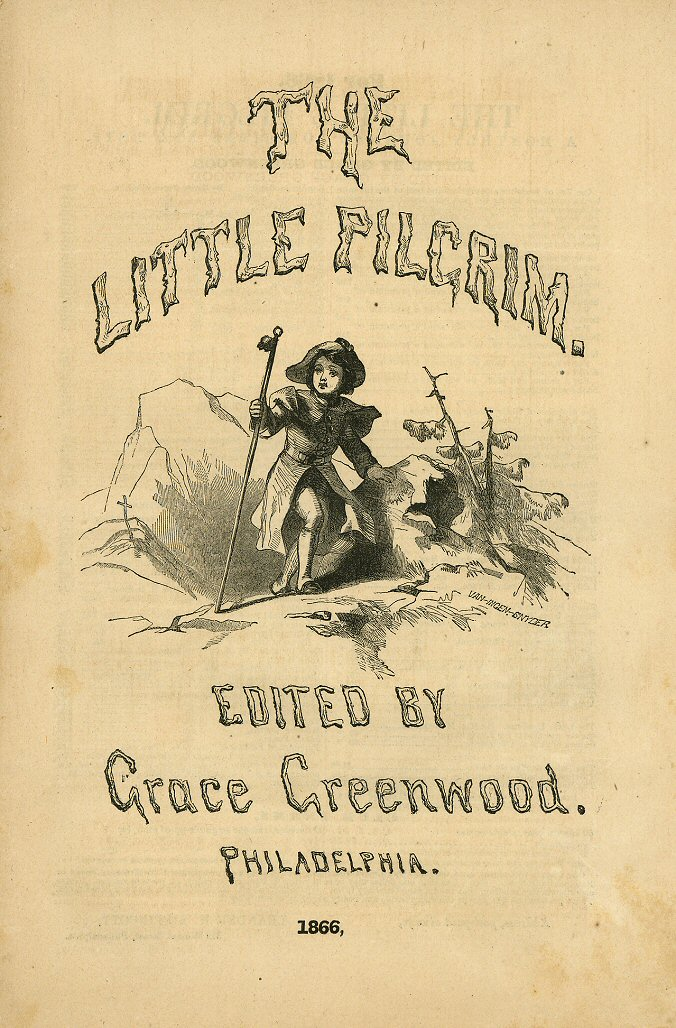
- The Little Pilgrim masthead 1866
- Editor: Sara Jane Lippincott
- Categories: Children’s magazine
- Frequency: Monthly
- Publisher: Leander K. Lippincott
- First issue: October 1853
- Final issue: April 1869
- Country: United States

The Little Pilgrim (1853–1869) was a monthly children's magazine, published in Philadelphia, Pennsylvania, by Leander K. Lippincott, and edited by his wife, Sara Jane Lippincott, working under the pseudonym Grace Greenwood.

The magazine's name references John Bunyan’s 1678 Christian allegory The Pilgrim's Progress, a book that many children of the mid-1800s would have been familiar with.

The Little Pilgrim had a peak subscription rate of 50,000, and published such well-known authors as John Greenleaf Whittier, James T. Fields, Lucy Larcom, Hans Christian Andersen, Charles Dickens and Louisa May Alcott.

In 1869 the magazine merged with The Little Corporal magazine.

== Founding ==
Though it was a secular periodical The Little Pilgrim strove for a high moral tone. In the October 1853 inaugural issue the editor wrote:

"It is not our intention to discuss profound religious doctrines or political problems with our young readers. But our aim shall always be to inculcate a high religious morality. 'Whatsoever things are true,…honest,…just,…lovely,' we shall heartily advocate; and ever strive to present, in fair and attractive forms, the divine truths contained in that blessed epitome of Faith, Freedom, Love, Temperance, and Peace – Christ’s Sermon on the Mount."

A year earlier, in October 1852, The Friend of Youth, a children's magazine with about 5,000 subscribers, had ceased publication, and the Lippincotts had obtained their subscription list. Readers were sent issues of the new publication to fulfill their lapsed subscriptions.

== Contents ==
From 1853 to 1856 each issue of the magazine contained eight pages that were 12.75 by 9 inches. Over time the number of pages increased while the page sizes decreased. From 1868 to 1869 each issue contained 32 pages that were 7 by 5.25 inches.

The magazine had a few woodcut illustrations, and was filled with stories, poems, history articles, letters, puzzles and anecdotes. Much of the content was written by editor Sara Jane Lippincott, writing as Grace Greenwood. There were stories and poems by well-known authors, and readers were encouraged to send in puzzles and letters on topics that interested them. John Greenleaf Whittier’s Barefoot Boy appeared in the January 1855 issue. In 1858 Louisa May Alcott had a few poems published, before she became famous. Between 1855 and 1867 Hans Christian Andersen had three stories published, and the Charles Dickens story A Child’s Dream of a Star was in the June 1868 issue. Rebecca Sophia Clarke was a regular contributor with her Little Prudy series.

Children often wrote letters telling of the death of a loved one, and for much of the magazine's history those obituaries were published. Both children and parents wrote in complaining about those death notices, but the editor felt it was important for grieving children to see their memorials published. Lippincott belatedly gave in to the complaints and, starting in 1864, the obituaries of non-famous people were no longer published.

== Merger with The Little Corporal ==
Inside the front cover of the April 1869 issue was a notice informing readers that the magazine would no longer be published. Sara Jane Lippincott wrote:

"This will be the last number issued of ‘The Little Pilgrim’ as a distinctive magazine. Henceforth it will be incorporated with 'The Little Corporal'….Our friends are not to think 'The Little Pilgrim' is dead; he has only become a sort of Siamese-twin to 'The Little Corporal,' hand in hand with whom, we trust, he will make his monthly rounds for many a year to come, bringing pleasure and profit to such an army of girls and boys as was never before enlisted under one banner. His mother’s hand and brain will still guide him on his way, so that he will not lose his identity in that of his larger brother; Grace Greenwood will be a constant contributor. In thanking our friends for the patronage they have bestowed upon 'The Little Pilgrim' through so many years, we ask that it may be continued under this new association, believing that they will not only lose nothing by the change, but gain much. We believe 'The Little Corporal' has already the largest circulation of any juvenile magazine in the world. It has our best wishes that, with 'The Little Pilgrim's' aid, it may increase and multiply three fold."
