= My Second Album =

Studio album by Donna Fargo
- Released: February 1973
- Recorded: October – November 1972
- Studio: Jack Clement Recording (Nashville, Tennessee)
- Genre: Country, country pop
- Label: Dot
- Producer: Stan Silver

Donna Fargo chronology
The Happiest Girl in the Whole U.S.A. (1972)	My Second Album (1973)	All About a Feeling (1973)

Singles from My Second Album
- 1. "Superman" Released: December 1972; 2. "You Were Always There" Released: May 1973

Professional ratings
Review scores
Source	Rating
Allmusic	4/5 stars

My Second Album is the second studio album released by American country artist Donna Fargo. The album was released in February 1973 on Dot Records and was produced by Fargo's husband and manager Stan Silver. The album spawned two number one singles on the Billboard country chart and was one of two albums Donna Fargo would release in 1973.

== Background and content ==
My Second Album was recorded in two sessions between October and November 1972 at the Jack Clement Recording Studio in Nashville, Tennessee, United States. The October recording sessions produced the songs "Superman", "How Would I Do", "I'd Love You to Want Me", "A Song I Can Sing", among others. The November 1972 session produced the final two songs for the album. The album's name was derived from the fact that it was Fargo's second studio album. Seven of the ten tracks included on My Second Album were written entirely by Fargo herself. The second track "You Don't Mess Around with Jim" was a cover of the Pop single by Jim Croce and the third track "Don't Be Angry" was a cover version of the original Stonewall Jackson single. Fargo would later release "Don't Be Angry" as a single in 1976 that would reach the Top 5 on the Billboard country chart. The eighth track "I'd Love You to Want Me" was written by songwriter Kent LaVoie. Like Fargo's previous album The Happiest Girl in the Whole U.S.A., the release was recorded in a traditional country music style.

My Second Album was released as a LP record, which contained five songs on each side of the record. The album has not been reissued on a compact disc since its original 1973 release.

== Release ==
The lead single released from the album entitled "Superman" was released in December 1972. The single became Fargo's third #1 single on the Billboard Magazine Hot Country Singles chart, while also reaching #41 on the Billboard Hot 100, and #35 on the Billboard Hot Adult Contemporary Tracks chart. In Canada, "Superman" reached #1 on the RPM Country Singles chart and #75 on the RPM Top Singles chart. The album's fifth track titled "You Were Always There" was spawned as the second single in May 1973 and also reached #1 on the Billboard Magazine Hot Country Singles chart. "You Were Always There" also peaked at #93 on the Billboard Hot 100, #47 on the Hot Adult Contemporary Tracks chart, #1 on the Canadian RPM Country Singles chart, and #37 on the RPM Adult Contemporary list. My Second Album was released in February 1973 on Dot Records. It became Fargo's second and final album to top the Billboard Magazine Top Country Albums list, while also becoming her final album to chart the Billboard 200, reaching #104. My Second Album also reached its highest position on the Canadian RPM Top Albums chart, peaking at #36.

My Second Album was retrospectively reviewed by Allmusic and received four out of five stars, without a written review provided.

== Track listing ==
All songs composed by Donna Fargo, except where noted.

Side one

1. "Song I Can Sing"
2. "You Don't Mess Around with Jim" – (Jim Croce)
3. "Don't Be Angry" – (Wade Jackson)
4. "Have Yourself a Time"
5. "You Were Always There"

Side two

1. "Superman"
2. "How Would I Live Here"
3. "I'd Love You to Want Me" – (Kent LaVoie)
4. "He Can Have All He Wants"
5. "Forever Is as Far as I Could Go"

== Personnel ==
- Harold Bradley – bass guitar
- Larry Butler – piano
- Jimmy Capps – guitar
- Jerry Carrigan – drums
- Buzz Cason – backing vocals
- Pete Drake – steel guitar
- Ray Edenton – guitar
- Donna Fargo – lead vocals
- Buddy Harman – drums
- Lloyd Green – steel guitar
- The Sheldon Kurland Strings – strings
- Charlie McCoy – harmonica
- Bob Moore – bass
- Leon Rhodes – bass guitar
- Hargus "Pig" Robbins – piano
- Billy Sanford – guitar
- Wendy Suits – backing vocals
- Diane Tidwell – backing vocals
- Bobby Thompson – banjo
- Bergen White – backing vocals

== Charts ==
=== Weekly charts ===
Chart (1973)	Peak position
Canadian Albums (RPM)	36
US Billboard 200	104
US Top Country Albums (Billboard)	1

=== Year-end charts ===
Chart (1973)	Position
US Top Country Albums (Billboard)	25

=== Singles ===
Year	Song	Peak chart positions					
Year	Song	US Country	US	US AC	CAN Country	CAN	CAN AC
1972	"Superman"	1	41	35	1	75	—
1973	"You Were Always There"	1	93	47	1	—	37
"—" denotes releases that did not chart
