= Sara Jane Lippincott =

American poet

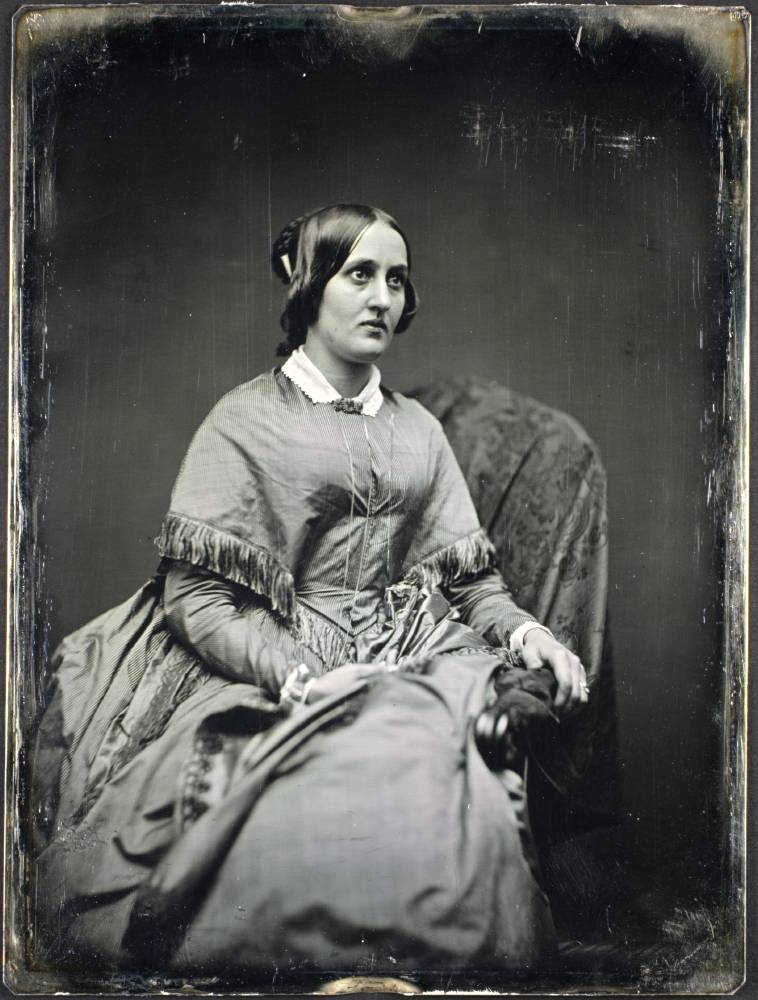
- Sara Jane Lippincott ("Grace Greenwood"), circa 1850
- Born: Sara Jane Clarke; September 23, 1823; Pompey, New York, U.S.
- Died: April 20, 1904 (aged 80); New Rochelle, New York
- Resting place: Grove Cemetery, New Brighton, Pennsylvania, U.S.
- Education: Greenwood Institute
- Occupations: Author; poet; correspondent; lecturer; newspaper founder
- Spouse: Leander K. Lippincott (m. 1853)
- Children: Annie Grace Lippincott
- Relatives: Jonathan Edwards
- Writing career
- Pen name: Grace Greenwood
- Language: English
- Genres: journalism, fiction, poetry, children's literature
- Subjects: women's rights, abolition

Signature
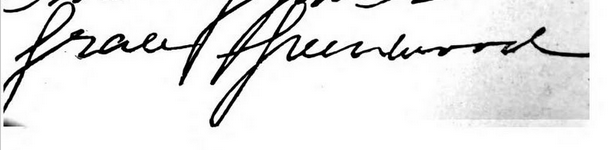

Sara Jane Lippincott (pseudonym Grace Greenwood) (née Clarke; September 23, 1823 – April 20, 1904) was an American writer, poet, correspondent, lecturer, and newspaper founder. One of the first women to gain access into the Congressional press galleries, she used her questions to advocate for social reform and women's rights.

Her best known books for children are entitled, History of My Pets (1850); Recollections of My Childhood (1851); Stories of Many Lands (1866); Merrie England (1854); Bonnie Scotland (1861); Stories and Legends of Travel and History; Stories and Sights of France and Italy (1867). The volumes for older readers are two series of collected prose writings, Greenwood Leaves (1849, 1851); Poems (1850); Haps and Mishaps of a Tour in Europe (1852); A Forest Tragedy (1856); A Record of Five Years (1867); New Life in New Lands (1873); Victoria, Queen of England. This last was published, in 1883, by Anderson & Allen of New York, and Sampson, Low & Marston, London. Lippincott was connected as editor and contributor with various American magazines, as well as weekly and daily papers. Lippincott also wrote much for London journals, especially for All the Year Round. For several years, she lived almost wholly in Europe, for the benefit of her greatly impaired health and for the education of her daughter. When she returned to the United States, she lived in Washington, D.C., and then New York.

She was a prominent member of the literary society of New York along with Anne Lynch Botta, Edgar Allan Poe, Margaret Fuller, Ralph Waldo Emerson and Horace Greeley, Richard Henry Stoddard, Andrew Carnegie, Mary Mapes Dodge, Julia Ward Howe, Charles Butler, Fitz-Greene Halleck, Delia Bacon, and Bayard Taylor, among others.

== Early years and education ==
Sara Jane Clarke was born on September 23, 1823, at Pompey, New York to parents Deborah Baker Clarke (c. 1791–1874) and Dr. Thaddeus C. Clarke (1770–1854), a descendant of the family of Jonathan Edwards.

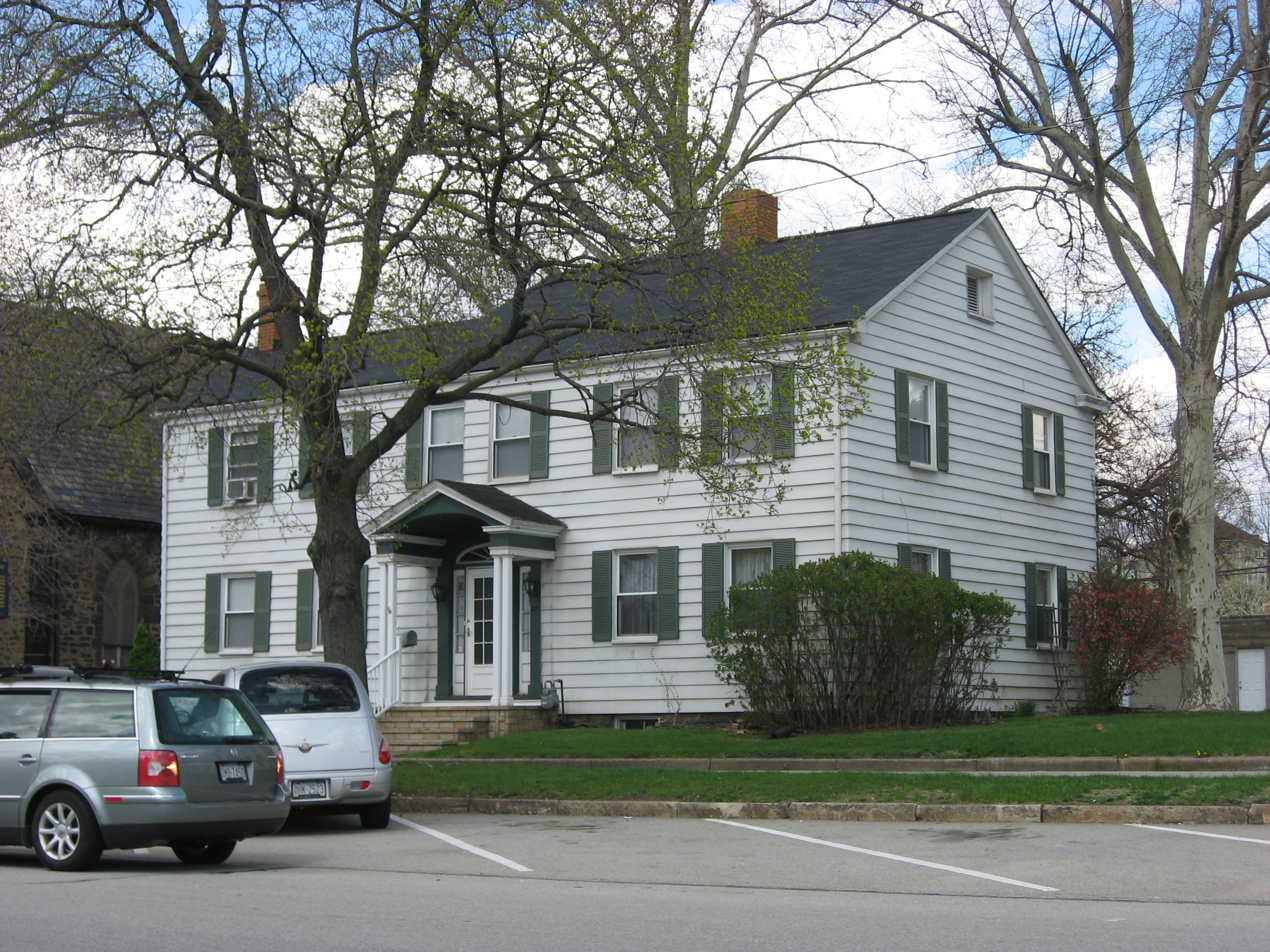
Lippincott's house in New Brighton

Fearless, at ten years of age, she rode a bare-backed horse, standing on his back. At the age of twelve, she went to school in Rochester, New York living with her older brother. There was nothing remarkable about her education, but she did study Italian, algebra, calculus, English and French history, though literature was her delight, and it became evident that writing was her vocation. At the age of sixteen, she was providing "fresh, piquant, racy" pieces to the Rochester papers. She removed with her family in 1842 (Note: 1843 is also reported.) to New Brighton, Pennsylvania, where her father practiced as a physician, and which she considered to be her home time for the rest of her life. There, she attended the Greenwood Institute, a ladies' academy, from which she may have taken her pseudonym. She left school at the age of nineteen.

== Career ==
=== Poet, writer, correspondent ===
Not long after she returned home, in 1845 and 1846, she started writing using the pen name, Grace Greenwood. The earliest writing of Lippincott was in the form of poetry and children's stories, which she published in local papers. In 1844, she drew national attention, at age 21, with a poem published in the New York Mirror, then under the editorship of George Pope Morris and Nathaniel Parker Willis. Soon after, she was writing for the Home Journal and other literary magazines of the day, under both her given name and her pseudonym. In the February 14, 1846 issue of the Home Journal, The Wife's Appeal, a poem by Sara J. Clarke, is published just above Tit-for-Tat, a story by Grace Greenwood. By October 1849, Godey's Lady's Book listed her as an assistant editor and she was also editor of Godey's Dollar Newspaper.

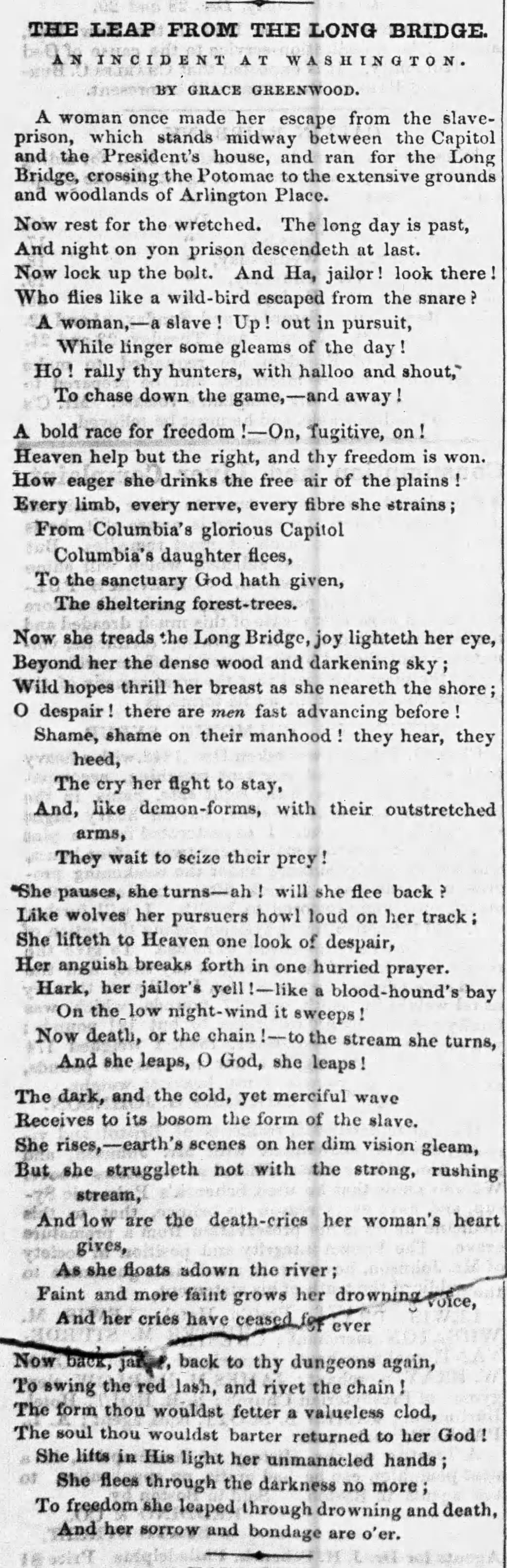
"The Leap from the Long Bridge—An Incident at Washington," published in the December 13, 1850 issue of The Liberator abolitionist paper, centers an 1833 incident involving the slave catcher Jilson Dove that was reported by Benjamin Lundy

For six or eight years, her summer home was New Brighton. In winter, she was in Philadelphia, Washington D.C., New York City, writing for Whittier, or for Willis and Morris, or for Neal's Gazette, or for Godey. Lippincott was the first "lady correspondent" in Washington, D.C., beginning her work in that line with letters to a Philadelphia paper in 1850. That year, many of her early sketches and letters were collected and republished by Ticknor & Fields under the name of Greenwood Leaves. She would go on to become a correspondent for the Saturday Evening Post. She was a highly respected journalist and consistently argued for the reform of women's roles and rights. She joined the National Era, a weekly abolitionist newspaper, and copyedited the serialized original version of Harriet Beecher Stowe's Uncle Tom's Cabin as well as writing columns, travel letters, and articles. Her staunch abolitionist views contributed to the ongoing national controversy.

Lippincott's poetry received significant critical attention. A published collection, Poems (1851), included passionate poetry and references to her intimate friendship to Anna Phillips, indicating an acceptance of intimate same sex friendships. Also that year, she published History of My Pets. Sophia Hawthorne wrote that her husband, the author Nathaniel Hawthorne, considered it "the best children's book he has ever seen".

In 1853, she made her first visit to Europe, on an assignment for The New York Times, having the distinction of being the first woman reporter on the Times payroll. She spent a little over a year abroad, which, in the dedication to her daughter of one of her juvenile books, she calls "the golden year of her life". Her accounts of her travels were well-received contributions to literature of the day. The correspondence was collected immediately after her return, and published under the title of Haps and Mishaps of a Tour in Europe. Upon her return, she also made frequent excursions into California, writing vivid descriptions of the land. In the fall of 1855, she published Merrie England, the first of a series of books of foreign travel for children. Nathaniel Hawthorne criticized her travel letters, calling her an "ink-stained woman" and claiming he could do as well. Despite this, Lippincott seems to have gotten along amiably with Hawthorne's family. She dedicated her children's book Recollections of My Childhood, and Other Stories to his children Julian and Una Hawthorne.

=== Publisher ===
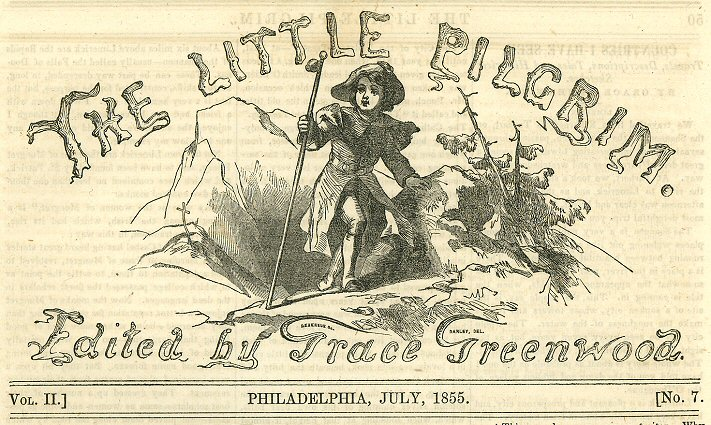
The Little Pilgrim masthead, 1855

On October 17, 1853, she married Leander K. Lippincott, of Philadelphia, who was a correspondent for several New York papers. That year, Lippincott and her husband started The Little Pilgrim, a monthly American children's magazine devoted to the amusement, instruction, and well-being of children. She was soon producing magazine articles and essays, her contributions conveying historical and biographical information. In this paper, Louisa May Alcott made her debut as a writer of children's stories. Collected from time to time, and published by Ticknor & Fields, they made a juvenile library numbering nearly a dozen volumes, remarkable for the felicitous manner in which they conveyed historical information.

On October 3, 1855, they had a daughter, Annie Grace. In the spring of 1856, a volume, entitled A Forest Tragedy, and other Tales, appeared; and in the fall of 1857, Stories and Legends of History and Travel, was the second of her travel series.

=== Activist ===
Distinguishing herself as a lecturer on literary topics, Lippincott also lectured extensively before and during the Civil War on her abolitionist stance and to other social issues, such as prison and asylum reform, as well as the abolition of capital punishment. During the war, Lippincott was a lecturer to soldiers and at United States Sanitary Commission Sanitary Fairs. President Abraham Lincoln referred to her as "Grace Greenwood the Patriot". However, women's rights became the focus of her speeches, particularly after the war. Her writings from this period were republished in Records of Five Years (1867). By the 1870s, Lippincott wrote primarily for the New York Times. Her articles focused mainly on women's issues, such as advocating for Fanny Kemble's right to wear trousers, Susan B. Anthony's right to vote and all women's right to receive equal pay for equal work.

=== London and Capitol Hill ===
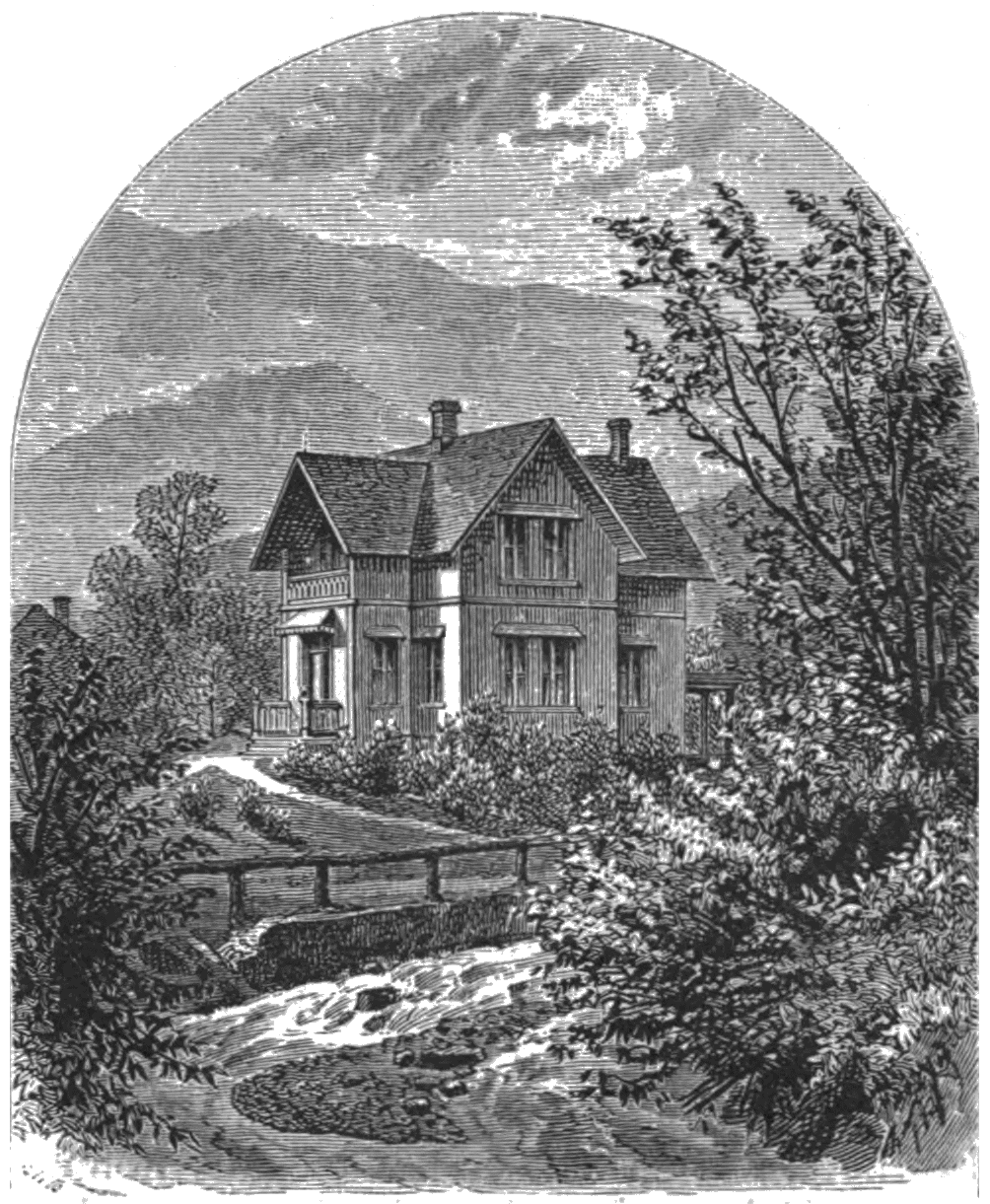
Lippincott's summer cottage, Manitou, Colorado, 1876

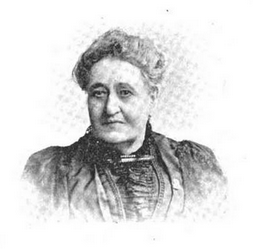
Sara Lippincott (1895)

The marriage was not a happy union. After her husband fled the United States in 1876 to escape prosecution for misappropriation of government funds, Lippincott continued her writing and resumed lecturing in order to support herself and her daughter, who trained for a career on the stage.

By 1879, Lippincott was residing in London, having moved to Europe with her daughter. For the ten years preceding this, she had done most work and won most distinction in journalism, principally in articles contributed from Washington, to the New York Tribune and the New York Times, on national and political questions, which she has handled in a patriotic way, showing an unusual knowledge of political history and of the construction, principles and tactics of the two opposing parties of the United States and time. She had also contributed to the New York Times, and a leading California journal, several series of letters from Europe—principally from London. She worked for the London Journal, and also wrote a biography, Queen Victoria: Her Girlhood and Womanhood (1883). In 1887, she returned to the United States and continued to work.

In 1895, she was living on Capitol Hill with her daughter, and was engaged upon the piece, "Recollections of Washington". But as much as she loved the capital city, her health was better when she was abroad.

== Death and legacy ==
Lippincott later lived with her daughter in New Rochelle, New York, where she died of bronchitis on April 20, 1904. Lippincott is buried in the Civil War section of Grove Cemetery in New Brighton. Her obituary was on the front page of the New York Times, "proving her importance as a literary figure in the nineteenth century".

== Style and phases ==
There appear in the writings of Lippincott three phases of development, three epochs of a literary career. The first lasted from the days of the boarding-school till marriage, —from the first merry chit-chat and Greenwood Leaves, to the full-rounded, mellow prime, as displayed in the letters from Europe. Then follows a decade, during which story-writing for children principally occupied her pen. With the Civil War commenced the third period, years "vexed with the drums and tramplings," the struggles of middle life.

== Works ==
- Greenwood Leaves (1850)
- History of my Pets (1851)
- Poems (1851)
- Recollections of my Childhood, and other stories (1852)
- Haps and Mishaps of a Tour in Europe (1854)
- Merrie England (1855)
- Forest Tragedy, and other tales (1856)
- Stories and Legends of Travel and History (1857)
- Stories from Famous Ballads (1860)
- Bonnie Scotland (1861)
- Records of Five Years (1867)
- Stories and Sights of France and Italy (1867)
- Stories of Many Lands (1867)
- Eminent Women of the Age: being narratives of the lives and deeds of the most prominent women of the present generation (1868)
- Summer Etchings in Colorado (1873)
- New Life in New Lands (1873)
- Heads and Tails: studies and stories of pets (1875)
- Emma Abbott, prima donna (1878)
- Queen Victoria, her girlhood and womanhood (1883)
- Stories for Home-folks, young and old (1884)
- Stories and Sketches (1892) (with Rossiter W. Raymond)
- Treasures from Fairyland (1879)
