= You Were Always There =

Single by Donna Fargo

from the album My Second Album
- B-side: "He Can Have All He Wants"
- Released: May 1973
- Recorded: November 1972
- Studio: Jack Clement Recording (Nashville, Tennessee)
- Genre: Country
- Length: 3:16
- Label: Dot 17460
- Songwriter(s): Donna Fargo
- Producer(s): Stan Silver

Donna Fargo singles chronology
"Superman" (1972)	"You Were Always There" (1973)	"Little Girl Gone" (1973)

"You Were Always There" is a song written and recorded by American country music artist Donna Fargo. It was released in May 1973 as the second single from the album My Second Album. The song was Fargo's fourth hit on the country chart and her fourth number one. The single stayed at number one for a single week and spent a total of twelve weeks on the chart.

== Charts ==
=== Weekly charts ===
Chart (1973)	Peak position
US Hot Country Songs (Billboard)	1
US Billboard Hot 100	93
US Easy Listening (Billboard)	47
Canadian RPM Country Tracks	1
Canadian RPM Adult Contemporary Tracks	37

=== Year-end charts ===
Chart (1973)	Position
US Hot Country Songs (Billboard)	41
