= Whatever I Say Means I Love You =

Studio album by Donna Fargo
- Released: July 1975
- Recorded: June – October 1974
- Genre: Country
- Label: Dot
- Producer: Stan Silver

Donna Fargo chronology
Miss Donna Fargo (1974)	Whatever I Say Means I Love You (1975)	On the Move (1976)

Singles from Whatever I Say Means I Love You
- 1. "Hello Bluebird" Released: June 1975; 2. "Whatever I Say Means I Love You" Released: September 1975; 3. "What Will the New Year Bring" Released: November 1975; 4. "You're Not Charlie Brown" Released: February 1976

Professional ratings
Review scores
Source	Rating
Allmusic	2.5/5 stars

Whatever I Say Means I Love You is the fifth studio album released by American country artist Donna Fargo. The album was released in July 1975 on Dot Records and was produced by Stan Silver. It was Fargo's final album for the Dot label and produced four singles between 1975 and 1976 that each charted on the Billboard country music chart.

== Background and content ==
Whatever I Say Means I Love You was recorded in a series of sessions between April and October 1974. The first session in April recorded the song "What Will the New Year Bring". The sessions in June and October of that year produced the album's final tracks. Whatever I Say Means I Love You was recorded at the Ray Stevens Sound Laboratory in Nashville, Tennessee, United States, Fargo's first release to be recorded at this particular studio. The album consisted of eleven tracks of material, all of which were written by Fargo herself. The album's themes related to that of optimism and happiness, with tracks such as "Hello Little Bluebird", "Sing, Sing, Sing", and "Hip on Happiness". Whatever I Say Means I Love You was released as an LP record with six songs on the album's "A" side of the record and five songs on the album's "B" side. It has not been reissued on a compact disc since its original release.

== Release ==
Whatever I Say Means I Love You spawned its first single "Hello Little Bluebird" in June 1975. The song became the album's only major hit, reaching #14 on the Billboard Magazine Hot Country Singles chart and #8 on the Canadian RPM Country Singles chart. The title track was the album's second single and peaked at #38 on the Billboard country chart, followed by the album's eighth track "What Will the New Year Bring" in September 1975, which peaked at #58 on the Billboard Hot Country Singles Chart. It spawned its fourth and final single "You're Not Charlie Brown" in February 1976, which reached #60 on the country chart, becoming Fargo's lowest charting single up to that point. The album was officially released in July 1975 and peaked at #28 on the Billboard Magazine Top Country Albums chart, Fargo's first album to peak outside of the country Top 10.

The album was reviewed retrospectively by Allmusic and received two and a half out of five stars, Fargo's lowest rating from the website.

== Track listing ==
All songs composed by Donna Fargo.

Side one

1. "Hello Little Bluebird"
2. "Whatever I Say (Means I Love You)"
3. "I Didn't Mean (To Run Him Away)"
4. "2 Sweet 2 Be Forgotten"
5. "Sing, Sing, Sing"

Side two

1. "You're Not Charlie Brown (And I'm Not Raggedy Ann)"
2. "Hip on Happiness"
3. "What Will the New Year Bring"
4. "Rain Song"
5. "I Have the Strangest Feeling (You're Gone)"
6. "One More Memory"

== Personnel ==
- Jimmy Capps – guitar
- Jerry Carrigan – drums
- Buzz Cason – background vocals
- Pete Drake – steel guitar
- Ray Edenton – rhythm guitar
- Donna Fargo – lead vocals
- Farrell Morris – percussion
- Nashville String Machine – strings
- Leon Rhodes – bass guitar
- Hargus "Pig" Robbins – piano
- Billy Sanford – guitar
- Jerry Smith – piano
- Buddy Spicher – fiddle
- Wendy Suits – background vocals
- Diane Tidwell – background vocals
- Shirley Temple Choir – background vocals
- Bergen White – background vocals

== Sales chart positions ==
Album

Chart (1975)	Peak position
U.S. Top Country Albums	28

Singles

Year	Song	Chart positions	
Year	Song	US Country	CAN Country
1975	"Hello Little Bluebird"	14	8
1975	"Whatever I Say (Means I Love You)"	38	—
1975	"What Will the New Year Bring"	58	—
1976	"You're Not Charlie Brown"	60	—
"—" denotes releases that did not chart
