= The Little Corporal =

19th century American children's magazine

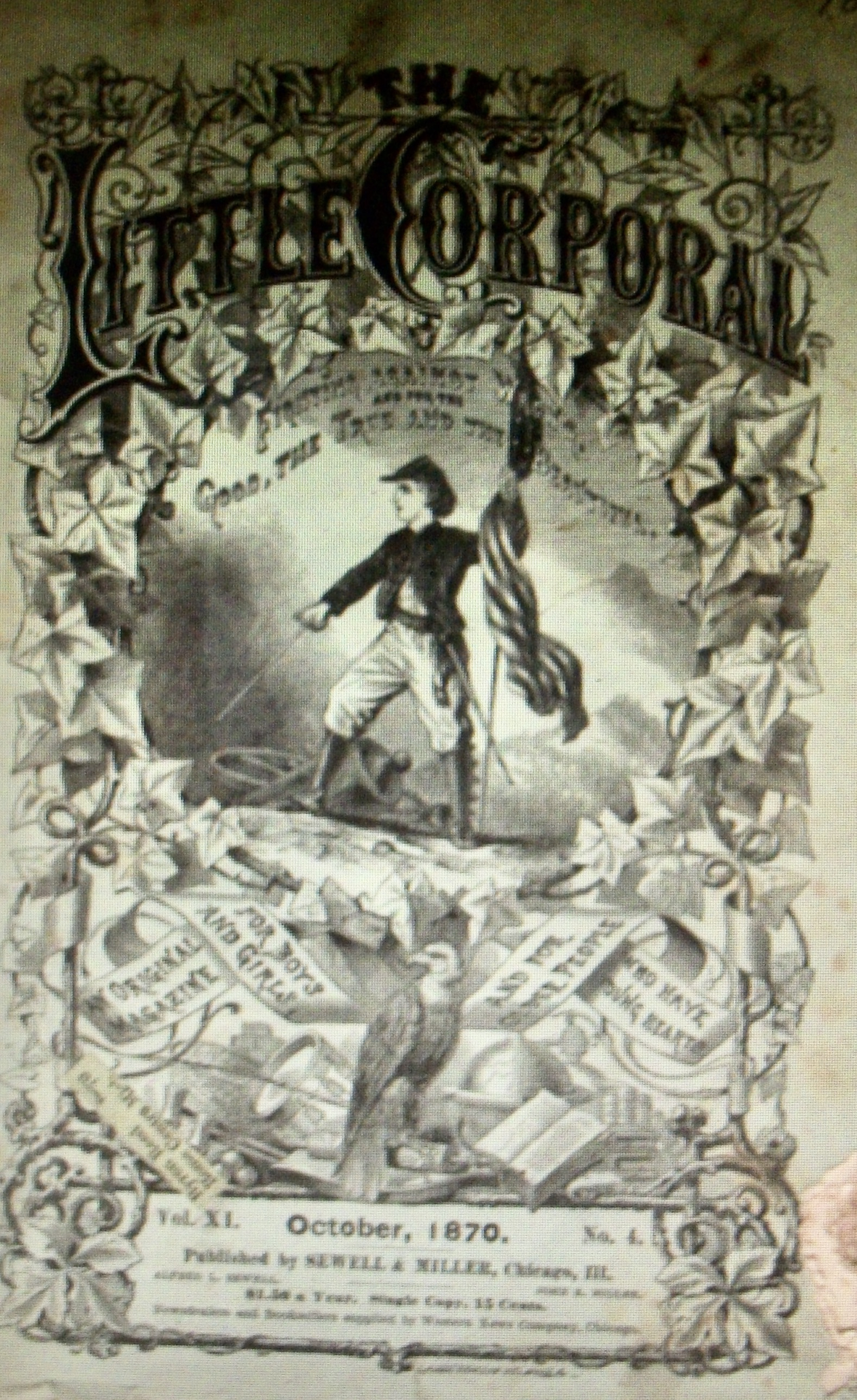
- The Little Corporal October 1870 cover
- Editor: Emily Huntington Miller
- Former editors: Alfred L. Sewell, Edward Eggleston
- Categories: Children’s magazine
- Frequency: Monthly
- Publisher: Alfred L. Sewell, John Edwin Miller
- First issue: July 1865
- Final issue: April 1875
- Country: United States
- Based in: Chicago, Illinois

The Little Corporal was a monthly children's magazine published in Chicago Illinois from 1865 to 1875 and became the first children's periodical in the United States to gain a nation-wide readership. The magazine had a strong emphasis on patriotism and had the motto "Fighting against Wrong, and for the Good and the True and the Beautiful."

It published works by popular writers of the day, including Harriet Mann Miller (writing as Olive Thorne), Sarah Chauncey Woolsey (writing as Susan Coolidge), Josephine Pollard and Harry Castlemon. The periodical merged with St. Nicholas Magazine in 1875.

== Founding ==
Publisher Alfred L. Sewell did not originally plan on starting a children's magazine. In 1865 he enlisted an "army" of children to raise money for the United States Sanitary Commission, which helped wounded soldiers during the American Civil War. The children were asked to sell printed pictures of Old Abe, a bald eagle that was the mascot of an army regiment. Selling one picture would earn a child the rank of corporal in Sewell's Army of the American Eagle, and higher ranks were earned by higher sales. Thousands of children joined Sewell's "army" and raised $16,000.

As a reward for their efforts each child who sold a picture received the first issue of The Little Corporal magazine in July 1865. In that issue Sewell wrote:

"Your precious letters, your sweet heart-words, and your earnest patriotism, seemed to breath [sic] into my spirit a new life, and I said, 'Oh that I had some medium through which I might talk to my gallant children’s army.' Then the good thought spoke to me…, and said, 'Here is the 'Little Corporal,' send him as your aid-de-camp. Tell him what to say, and let him take besides a bundle of good things to refresh and amuse your little soldiers by the way.'....I know full well that all of them will be glad to see the Little Corporal's face month after month, and let him tell them pretty stories, and talk to them of each other, and hold their hearts together, and lead them into good and pleasant ways."

Sewell advertised that other children could join his fight for justice by sending in a dollar for a year's subscription, and within one year the magazine had a circulation of 35,000 copies.

== Content ==
The Little Corporal began as an octavo, 6 by 9 inches in size. The early issues were illustrated with a few woodcuts. There were stories, poems, and nature stories by Harriet Mann, writing as Olive Thorne. George F. Root wrote songs for each issue. There was a puzzle page, and a science column by Dr. Worthington Hooker, writing as Uncle Worthy.

The Little Corporal published works by Ohioan humor writer Rosella Rice, best known for her poems mythologizing the figure of Johnny Appleseed.

In 1869 the magazine became a quarto, 9.5 by 12 inches in size. There were more illustrations, and correspondence from readers was a new feature. That year circulation reached 80,000 copies.

== Editors ==
=== Alfred L. Sewell ===
For the first year Sewell edited The Little Corporal on his own, while continuing to run his publishing business. Though the magazine's content did not pertain to army matters Sewell used military terminology within it. Readers were referred to as soldiers or volunteers, and when a subscription expired he asked the child to reenlist to continue to "battle for the right, the good and true – and to help to purify and glorify, by true living and doing, our free and freedom loving America."

=== Edward Eggleston ===
Eggleston had been regularly contributing Native American stories when Sewell asked him to work as an editor. In the June 1866 issue Sewell wrote:

"I have the great pleasure of announcing this month that Edward Eggleston will hereafter share my editorial labors. Mr. Eggleston is so well known as a writer for children, and my readers have, during the past year, been so delighted with his Indian stories, that the mere statement that he is now one of the editors of The Little Corporal will cause rejoicing throughout our entire camp."

During his tenure as editor he wrote numerous short stories and articles, often using pen names, to hide the fact that several of his stories often appeared in the same issue. He soon discovered he was unable to support his family on his small earnings, so in December 1866 he accepted an editorial position at The Sunday School Teacher since it paid a higher wage.

=== Emily Huntington Miller ===
In July 1867 Sewell hired another regular contributor, Emily Huntington Miller, as a new editor. In the August 1867 issue Miller wrote her first editorial, which ended with:

My best thoughts, my best efforts, my best wishes, shall always be at The Little Corporal 's service; and as the editor has invited me to share with him the love and esteem he has won from the children, I trust that they will extend to me, as I now send to them, a hearty welcome."

Miller began writing most of the serialized stories for the magazine. At least one of them, The Royal Road to Fortune, was lengthened and published as a novel by Alfred L. Sewell & Co. It was announced as the first in the "Little Corporal Library."

In 1870 her husband, John Edwin Miller, left his job as a teacher and became the magazine's co-publisher.

== Acquiring The Little Pilgrim ==
In June 1869 the magazine announced that:

The Little Pilgrim has enlisted in The Little Corporal's army....The Little Pilgrim in coming to his western home readily joins The Little Corporal’s army, and becomes an aid."

For a time the Little Pilgrim's illustration was shown on the puzzle page and the magazine's cover, but by July 1870 his image was gone from the magazine.

== Chicago fire ==
In October 1871 the Great Chicago Fire destroyed Alfred L. Sewell's publishing company. All equipment was lost, as well as the magazine's subscription records, manuscripts and illustrations. Sewell gave The Little Corporal to editor Emily Huntington Miller and her husband, and Sewell moved to Evanston, where he started a newspaper and wrote a book about the fire.

The Millers sent out a sample notice to newspapers and magazines, asking that they write of their problem, and request that readers write and give their names and addresses. In lieu of the November issue subscribers were sent a single sheet folded into eight pages that told of the fire and asked them to renew their subscriptions early, to help the magazine to be reestablished.

After the December 1871 issue came out the Chicago Tribune wrote:

"The Little Corporal who appears as a vigorous Phoenix from the ruins, still waving his sword and carrying his colors, and as fresh and handsome as the ever was before the fire. A very pleasant feature of this number is a sketch of the triumphant Corporal, which Nast sent as a donation."

For a time after the Millers took over the magazine The Little Corporal appeared to prosper. In 1872 the magazine Work and Play was absorbed by the Corporal, and the puzzle column was renamed Work and Play. Subscriptions may have reached 100,000.

== Magazines demise, and merger with St. Nicholas ==
While subscriptions increased advertising revenue did not. During the 1870s few businesses were interested in advertising to a nationwide audience. Chicago businesses advertised in the magazine, but they would only pay small sums, for they were only interested in reaching the local market. The Little Corporal began to lose money. Subscription rates had already been raised, from a dollar a year to a dollar and a half, and it was felt the cost could not be raised again. The last issue was dated April 1875.

On April 12, 1875 a constable's sale was held to sell off the "entire outfit of the Little Corporal" including all equipment, office furniture, woodcuts and electrotype illustrations. On April 20, 1875 it was advertised that both The Little Corporal and The Schoolday Magazine would be merging with St. Nicholas Magazine.

In the June 1875 issue of St. Nicholas Emily Huntington Miller wrote her goodbyes to her readers:

After ten years of service, the "Corporal" has been put upon the retired list. We have had a long, brave march together, and it is hard parting company. You will miss your leader, and we shall miss the words of courage and devotion that came from the gallant army, East and West, North and South. But remember, you are none of you mustered out of service. Your new leader, St. Nicholas, enrolls his soldiers by the same pledge under which you first enlisted – "For the Good, the True, and the Beautiful" – and the "Corporal" feels safe and satisfied in leaving you to his guidance."
