= Miss Donna Fargo =

Studio album by Donna Fargo
- Released: 1974
- Recorded: February – April 1974
- Studio: Jack Clement Recording (Nashville, Tennessee)
- Genre: Country, Country pop
- Label: Dot, ABC (UK)
- Producer: Stan Silver

Donna Fargo chronology
All About a Feeling (1973)	Miss Donna Fargo (1974)	Whatever I Say Means I Love You (1975)

Singles from Miss Donna Fargo
- 1. "You Can't Be a Beacon If Your Light Don't Shine" Released: May 1974; 2. "US of A" Released: October 1974; 3. "It Do Feel Good" Released: February 1975

Professional ratings
Review scores
Source	Rating
Allmusic	3/5 stars

Miss Donna Fargo is the fourth studio album released by American country artist Donna Fargo. The album was released in 1974 on Dot Records (ABC Records in the UK) and was produced by Fargo's husband and manager Stan Silver. Unlike any of Fargo's previous releases, Miss Donna Fargo spawned three singles, all of which became Top 10 singles on the Billboard country chart, including "You Can't Be a Beacon If Your Light Don't Shine".

== Background ==
Miss Donna Fargo was recorded at the Jack Clement Recording Studio in Nashville, Tennessee. The first session took place in February 1974 and recorded the song, "You Can't Be a Beacon If Your Light Don't Shine". The album's other tracks were recorded during an unknown time between February and April 1974. The album consisted of eleven tracks of material, mainly all written by Fargo herself. The tenth track entitled "Heartbreak Hotel" was a cover of the single by Elvis Presley. The opening track "US of A" referred to patriotism in the United States. Miss Donna Fargo was originally released on an LP record. It contained six songs on the "A" side of the album and five songs on the "B" side of the album. It has never been reissued on a compact disc since its original 1974 release.

== Release ==
The first track on the album "You Can't Be a Beacon If Your Light Don't Shine" was released in May 1974 as the album's lead single. The song became Fargo's first #1 single on the Billboard Magazine Hot Country Singles chart since 1972, while also peaking at #57 on the Billboard Hot 100, and #14 on the Hot Adult Contemporary Tracks chart. On the Canadian RPM Country Singles chart, the song also reached #1, while also peaking at #41 on the RPM Top Singles Chart, and #15 on the RPM Adult Contemporary Singles chart. "US of A" was released as the album's second single in October 1974, peaking at #9 on the Billboard Magazine Hot Country Singles chart and #86 on the Billboard Hot 100. The third and final single spawned from the album was "It Do Feel Good" in February 1974, which peaked at #7 on the Billboard country chart and #98 on the Billboard Hot 100 chart. Both singles did not enter any Canadian chart lists. Miss Donna Fargo was officially released in 1974, and peaked at #4 on the Billboard Top Country Albums chart, becoming Fargo's final studio release to chart in the Top 10.

== Track listing ==
All tracks written by Donna Fargo, except where noted.

Side one

1. "You Can't Be a Beacon If Your Light Don't Shine" (Marty Cooper) – 3:15
2. "U.S. of A." – 3:40
3. "If You're Somewhere Listening" – 2:46
4. "Words" (Barry Gibb, Robin Gibb, Maurice Gibb) – 3:02
5. "Go Straight to Her" – 2:52
6. "It Do Feel Good" – 2:35

Side two

1. "Honeychild" – 3:10
2. "Only the Strong" – 2:56
3. "A Woman's Prayer" – 2:32
4. "Send Me Home" – 2:00
5. "Heartbreak Hotel" (Mae Boren Axton, Tommy Durden, Elvis Presley) – 3:34

== Sales chart positions ==
Album

Chart (1974)	Peak position
U.S. Top Country Albums	4

Singles

Year	Song	Peak chart positions					
Year	Song	US Country	US	US AC	CAN Country	CAN	CAN AC
1974	"You Can't Be a Beacon If Your Light Don't Shine"	1	57	14	1	41	15
1974	"U.S. of A."	9	86	—	—	—	—
1975	"It Do Feel Good"	7	98	—	—	—	—
"—" denotes releases that did not chart
