= A Tombstone Every Mile =

Single by Dick Curless

from the album Tombstone Every Mile
- Released: January 1965
- Genre: Country, truck-driving country
- Length: 2:56
- Label: Tower
- Songwriter(s): Dan Fulkerson
- Producer(s): Dan Fulkerson; Dick Curless

Dick Curless singles chronology
| "A Tombstone Every Mile" (1965) | "Six Times a Day (The Trains Come Down)" (1965) |

"A Tombstone Every Mile" is a song written by Dan Fulkerson and recorded by American country music artist Dick Curless. It was released in January 1965 as the lead single from the album of the same name. The song stayed at number five for two weeks and spent a total of seventeen weeks on the chart. The song refers to the "Haynesville Woods", an area around the small town of Haynesville in Aroostook County in northern Maine noted for many automobile crashes. Truck drivers would ship potatoes to market in Boston and a dangerous hairpin turn in the route through Haynesville was the inspiration for the song.

== Chart performance ==
| Chart (1965) | Peak position |
|---|---|
| U.S. Billboard Hot Country Singles | 5 |
| U.S. Cash Box Country Singles | 10 |

== Cover versions ==
Bill Kirchen recorded the song in 1994 and made it the title track of his album, Tombstone Every Mile. He also sang on a live version of the track on Nick Lowe's 2004 album, Untouched Takeaway.
