= Roy Horton =

American music executive

- Born: November 5, 1914; Broad Top City, Pennsylvania, US
- Died: September 23, 2003 (aged 88); Manchester, Connecticut, US
- Years active: 1939–1996
- Known for: Song publisher and music promoter
- Awards: Country Music Hall of Fame, 1982

Roy Horton (November 5, 1914 – September 23, 2003) was an American music executive known for over forty year role with Peer-Southern Music. Though based in New York City, Horton was a founding member of both the Country Music Association (CMA) and the Country Music Foundation. It was while he was CMA chairman in March 1967, Horton participated in the opening of the first Country Music Hall of Fame and Museum on Music Row in Nashville. Horton was himself inducted into the Hall of Fame in 1982.

== Early life ==
One of eleven children born near Broad Top City, Pennsylvania, Horton and his older brother Vaughn (1911–1988) turned away from coal mining, their father's occupation, to that of music. The brothers started work on radio in Pennsylvania and then later in New York City, followed by night club work along the East Coast of the United States.

== Musical performer ==
At the 1939 World's Fair in New York, Roy played upright bass behind Red River Dave McEnery. Also in New York, Horton participated in numerous recording session secured by his brother Vaughn in Rhythm and blues music for companies such as Continental, London, Majestic, MGM, National, and Varsity among others. While performing in New York, Roy and Vaughn formed the Pinetoppers with two other men to perform "hillbilly" music (as country music was known in the late 1930s and early 1940s) before adding sisters Trudy and Gloria Martin to form the Beaver Valley Sweethearts. Their biggest hit in 1951 was "Mockin' Bird Hill", a song where Vaughn provided the lyrics.

== Music publishing ==
During the 1940s, Horton began a long association with Peer-Southern Music where he would work for over forty years. Among the artists that Horton helped promote were Jimmie Rodgers (though he had died in 1933), the Carter Family, Floyd Tillman, Ted Daffan, Jimmie Davis, and Bill Monroe. Meanwhile, Roy's brother Vaughn would become a country music songwriter, writing such hits as "Hillbilly Fever", "Til the End of the World", "Sugar-Foot Rag", and a rewritten version of Rodgers' "Mule Skinner Blues" (Vaughn would be inducted into the Nashville Songwriters Hall of Fame in 1971.)

== Involvement with the CMA ==
In 1958, Horton would be a founding member of both the CMA and the Country Music Foundation despite being in New York. To help raise funds for the first Country Music Hall of Fame and Museum in Nashville, Horton created a multi-artist compilation album that was among the first to be marketed on television. The first museum was completed in 1967 with Horton participating in the ribbon-cutting ceremony for the Museum in March of that year (The first museum stayed open on Music Row in Nashville until December 2000, being replaced by the current museum in downtown Nashville in May 2001.)

== Peer-Southern Music album ==
By the 1990s, a dream Horton had about a compilation album of some of the material from the Peer song catalog came to fruition with the help of Merle Haggard. Recorded between 1996 and 1999 both in California and in Nashville, Horton worked with Haggard in selecting the twelve best songs from the catalog. One song, "Hang on to the Memories", was recorded with Davis. The album named The Peer Sessions was released in 2002.

== Personal life ==
Horton married his wife Lili in 1940 and remained so until Roy's 2003 death. They had one daughter, one son, and two grandchildren. Horton died on September 23, 2003, in Manchester, Connecticut, to several health issues, including diabetes and congestive heart failure that was further complicated by a stroke suffered in 2001. He was buried in Broad Top City, Pennsylvania.

== Legacy ==
In 1982, Horton would be inducted into the Country Music of Fame. Joining Horton that year were Lefty Frizzell and Marty Robbins.
