= Emily Huntington Miller =

American poet (1833–1913)

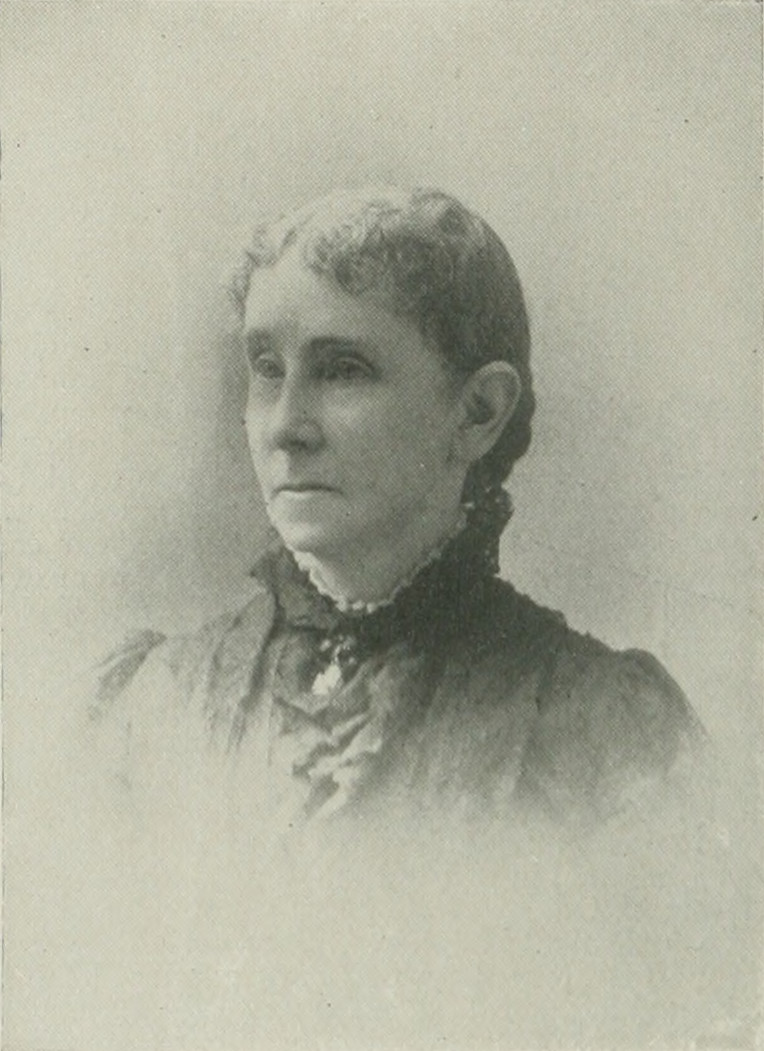
- Born: Emily Huntington; October 22, 1833; Brooklyn, Connecticut, U.S.
- Died: November 2, 1913 (aged 80); Mexico City Mexico
- Resting place: Glendale Cemetery, Akron, Ohio
- Occupations: Author; editor; poet; educator; suffragist
- Spouse: John E. Miller (m. 1860)
- Writing career
- Language: English

Emily Clark Huntington Miller (October 22, 1833 – November 2, 1913) was an American author, editor, poet, and educator who co-founded St. Nicholas Magazine, a publication for children. Earlier in her career, she served as the Assistant Editor of The Little Corporal, a children's magazine and Associate Editor of the Ladies' Home Journal. Miller and Jennie Fowler Willing were involved with organizing a convention in Cleveland in 1874, at which the National Woman's Christian Temperance Union was formed. In September 1891, Miller was appointed Dean of Women at Northwestern University in Illinois.

== Early years ==
Emily Clark Huntington was born in Brooklyn, Connecticut, October 22, 1833, the daughter of Methodist pastor Thomas Huntington and Paulina Clark. She received a liberal education and was graduated from Oberlin College, Oberlin, Ohio in 1857.

== Career ==
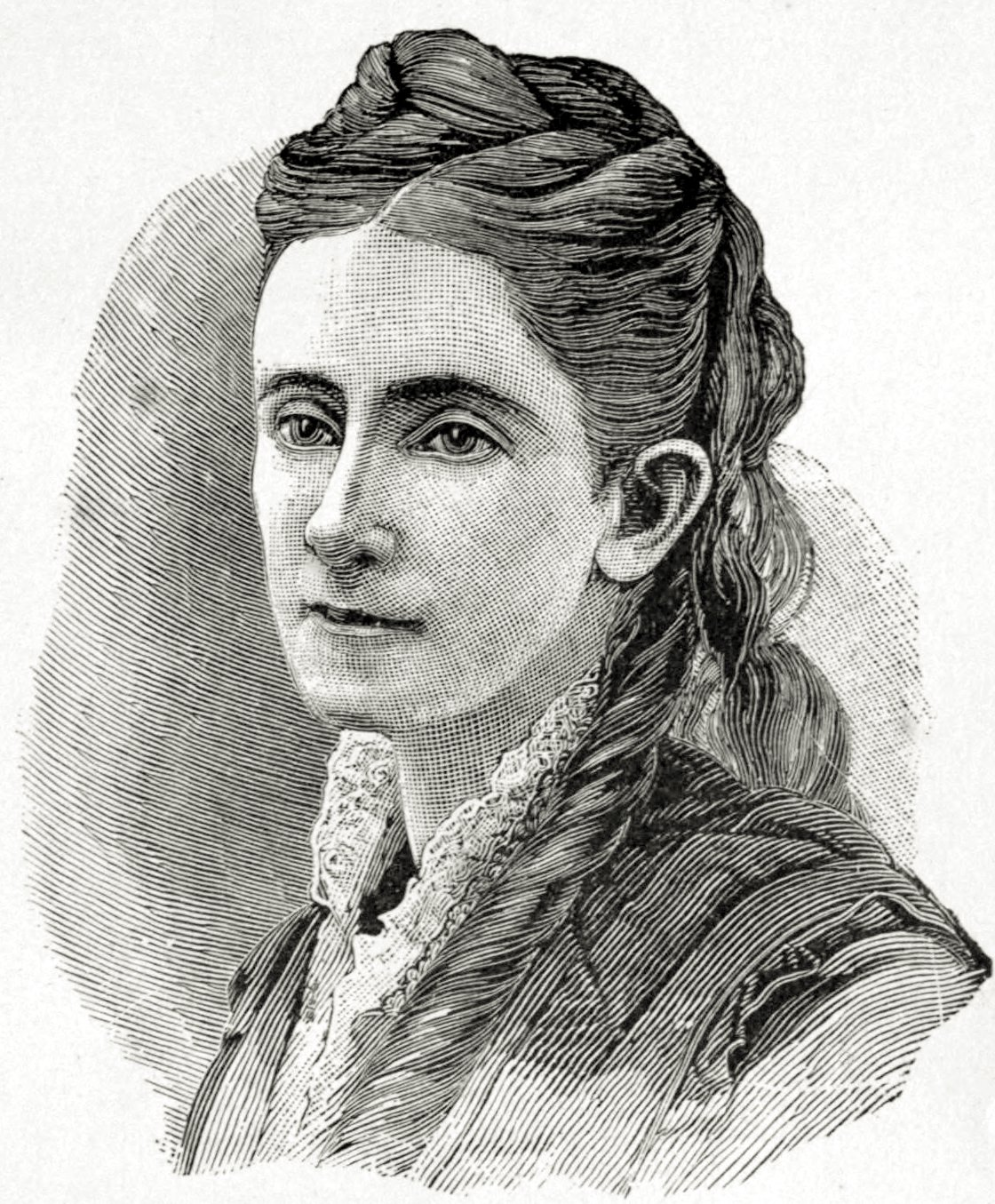
Emily Huntington Miller

Miller showed her literary ability in her school-days. While yet a girl, she published a number of sketches and stories, which attracted general attention. Thereafter, she was a constant and prolific contributor of sketches, short stories, serials, poems and miscellaneous articles to newspapers and magazines. She earned a reputation by her work on The Little Corporal. She gave much time and work to Sunday-school and missionary interests. She was connected with the Chautauqua Literary and Scientific Circle from its commencement, and served as president of the Chautauqua Woman's Club for four years. She was appointed Dean of Women at Northwestern University, in Evanston, Illinois, where she subsequently resided. Her published literary work included 15 volumes, some of which were republished in England, and all of which found wide circles of readers. Her poetical productions were numerous. Over 100 of her poems were set to music, including her 1865 poem Lilly's Secret, which became the basis for the lyrics to the popular Christmas song Jolly Old Saint Nicholas. In her varied career, she was equally successful as writer, educator, temperance-worker, and journalist.

in 1874, during which Jane Fowler Willing, a staff member at Wesleyan University, who worked in Northwestern University, Martha McClellan Brown from Alliance, Ohio, and Miller met together at Fairpoint, New York for a national Sunday school assembly. They believed that they could cure society's ills better than men could, and decided to combat liquor trafficking to prove that they could do it better than men. They then created an assembly and a national organization to promote this female work.

Besides her literary work, Miller prepared and gave lectures on temperance, also on missionary and educational subjects. She was prominently connected with the Woman's Foreign Missionary Society of the Methodist Episcopal Church, and was a Trustee of Northwestern University at Evanston, Illinois.

== Personal life ==
In 1860, she married John E. Miller. Of their children, three sons survived, including George A. Miller; their only daughter died in infancy. Mr. and Mrs. Miller moved from Evanston, Illinois, to St. Paul, Minnesota, where the husband died in 1882.

== Selected works ==
Author

- “Kirkwood series”
- “Little Neighbors”
- "Captain Fritz”
- “Fighting the enemy”
- “Highway and Hedges”

Popular music (lyrics only)

- My Good for Nothing
- Jolly Old Saint Nicholas

Hymns (lyrics only)

- Beyond the Dark River of Death
- Blessed Are the Children
- Easter Hymn
- Enter Thy Temple, Glorious King
- Father, While the Shadows Fall
- Hark, the Chorus Swelling
- I Love the Name of Jesus
- I Love to Hear the Story
- O, Land of the Blessed!
- O, Realm of Light
- Stay, Trembling Soul, and Do Not Fear
- Tell the blessed Tidings
- Work and Never Weary
- Baby's first Christmas
