= Big Wheel Cannonball =

Single by Dick Curless

from the album Hard, Hard Traveling Man
- B-side: "I Miss a Lot of Trains"
- Released: March 1970
- Genre: Country
- Length: 2:28
- Label: Capitol 2780
- Songwriter(s): Vaughn Horton
- Producer(s): George Richey

Dick Curless singles chronology
"The Wild Side of Town" (1969)	"Big Wheel Cannonball" (1970)	"Hard, Hard Traveling Man" (1970)

"Big Wheel Cannonball" (sometimes rendered as Big Wheel Cannon Ball) is a song written by Vaughn Horton. It follows the same melody as "Wabash Cannonball" by The Carter Family, but its lyrics eulogise trucks and truckers rather than trains.

It was originally released in 1967 by veteran Canadian singer Dick Todd, backed by the Appalachian Wildcats, on the small Peer-Southern Records label; this was shortly afterwards re-released on a national basis by Decca, and the Decca release rose to number 52 on the Billboard US Country charts, making it Todd's final chart entry.

In 1970, a cover version by American country singer Dick Curless was released. This version charted higher than Todd's original on Billboard, and also made the Canadian country charts.

Lawton Williams released a further cover in 1971 on his album Between Truck Stops.

== Chart performance (Curless's version) ==
Chart (1970)	Peak position
U.S. Billboard Hot Country Singles	27
Cash Box	30
Canadian RPM Country Tracks	18
