= All About a Feeling =

Studio album by Donna Fargo
- Released: October 1973
- Recorded: November 1972 – March 1973
- Studios: Jack Clement Recording (Nashville, Tennessee)
- Genres: Country, Country pop
- Label: Dot
- Producer: Stan Silver

Donna Fargo chronology
My Second Album (1973)	All About a Feeling (1973)	Miss Donna Fargo (1974)

Singles from All About a Feeling
- 1. "Little Girl Gone" Released: September 1973; 2. "I'll Try a Little Bit Harder" Released: January 1974

Professional ratings
Review scores
Source	Rating
Allmusic	3/5 stars
Christgau's Record Guide	C+

All About a Feeling is the third studio album released by American country artist Donna Fargo. The album was released in October 1973 on Dot Records and was produced by Fargo's husband and manager Stan Silver. It was Donna Fargo's second studio released in 1973 and spawned two Top 10 hits on the Billboard country chart between 1973 and 1974. It was Fargo's first studio album not to chart among the Billboard 200 albums list.

== Background and content ==
All About a Feeling was recorded in two sessions between November 1972 and March 1973, both at the Jack Clement Recording Studio in Nashville, Tennessee, United States. The session in November 1972 produced the songs "I'll Try a Little Bit Harder" and "Just Call Me". The session in March 1973 produced the rest of the album's material. All About a Feeling consisted of eleven tracks, all of which were written entirely by Fargo. This was unlike any of Fargo's previous releases, which contained either one or two tracks not written by Fargo herself. The opening track entitled "It Do Feel Good" would later become a Top 10 hit when it was featured on her 1974 release, Miss Donna Fargo.

All About a Feeling was originally released on an LP record, containing six songs on the A side of the record and five songs on the B side of the record. The album has never been reissued on a compact disc since its original 1973 release.

== Release ==
All About a Feeling's sixth track entitled "Little Girl Gone" was released as the lead single from the album in September 1973. The single became Fargo's first major hit not to reach number one, but instead peak at #2 on the Billboard Magazine Hot Country Singles chart, #57 on the Billboard Hot 100, and #43 on the Hot Adult Contemporary Tracks chart. In Canada, the single peaked at #2 on the RPM Country Singles chart and #55 on the RPM Adult Contemporary Singles chart. "I'll Try a Little Bit Harder" was spawned as the album's second and final single in January 1974, which peaked at #6 on the Billboard Magazine Hot Country Singles list. All About a Feeling was released in October 1973 on Dot Records and peaked at #5 on the Billboard Magazine Top Country Albums chart. It became Fargo's first album not to chart the Billboard 200 albums list.

Allmusic retrospectively reviewed All About a Feeling and gave it three out of five stars, stating, "Fargo's brand of upbeat and accessible country is the sort of music that brought the genre such tremendous mainstream success from the '70s onward."

== Track listing ==
All songs composed by Donna Fargo.

Side one

1. "It Do Feel Good" – 2:49
2. "I'll Try a Little Bit Harder" – 3:06
3. "Puffy Eyes" – 2:51
4. "Nothing Can Stay" – 2:22
5. "All About a Feeling" – 2:28

Side two

1. "Little Girl Gone" – 2:28
2. "Just Call Me" – 2:24
3. "Hot Diggety Dog" – 2:19
4. "Does It Matter" – 2:09
5. "Rotten Little Song" – 2:00
6. "Just a Friend of Mine" – 2:21

== Personnel ==
- Willie Ackerman – drums
- Harold Bradley – bass guitar
- Larry Butler – piano
- Jimmy Capps – guitar
- Jerry Carrigan – drums
- Buzz Cason – background vocals
- Pete Drake – steel guitar
- Ray Edenton – rhythm guitar
- Donna Fargo – lead vocals
- Johnny Gimble – fiddle
- Buddy Harman – drums
- Lloyd Green – dobro, steel guitar
- The Sheldon Kurland Strings – strings
- Charlie McCoy – harmonica, vibes
- Bob Moore – bass
- Farrell Morris – percussion
- Leon Rhodes – bass guitar
- Hargus "Pig" Robbins – piano
- Billy Sanford – guitar
- Buddy Spicher – fiddle
- Wendy Suits – background vocals
- Shirley Temple Choir – background vocals
- Diane Tidwell – background vocals
- Bobby Thompson – banjo
- Bergen White – background vocals

== Sales chart positions ==
Album

Chart (1973)	Peak position
U.S. Top Country Albums	5

Singles

Year	Song	Peak chart positions				
Year	Song	US Country	US	US AC	CAN Country	CAN AC
1973	"Little Girl Gone"	2	57	43	2	55
1974	"I'll Try a Little Bit Harder"	6	—	—	—	—
"—" denotes releases that did not chart
