= Funny Face (Donna Fargo song) =

Single by Donna Fargo

from the album The Happiest Girl in the Whole U.S.A.
- B-side: "How Close You Come (To Being Gone)"
- Released: August 1972
- Recorded: April 1972
- Studio: Jack Clement Recording (Nashville, Tennessee)
- Genre: Country
- Length: 2:46
- Label: Dot Records 17429
- Songwriter: Donna Fargo
- Producer: Stan Silver

Donna Fargo singles chronology
"The Happiest Girl in the Whole U.S.A." (1972)	"Funny Face" (1972)	"Superman" (1972)

"Funny Face' is a song written and recorded by American country music artist Donna Fargo. It was released in August 1972 as the second single from the album The Happiest Girl in the Whole U.S.A. The song hit number one on the country chart and was a Gold Record. "Funny Face" remained number one for three weeks and spent a total of fourteen weeks on the chart. "Funny Face" also crossed over to the pop chart, peaking at number five, making it her only top 10 hit on the Hot 100 chart.

Fargo revealed to Tom Roland in The Billboard Book of Number One Country Hits that she originally offered comedian George Lindsey the chance to record the song first, but he turned it down. "It was a natural song for me to write, 'cause my husband used to call me 'funny face' and I used to call him 'fuzzy face' because he always wore a beard," she told Roland. "It was just kind of a little song to him." She wrote 16 verses to it but decided to use only the first two in her record.

== Chart performance ==
Chart (1972)	Peak position
US Hot Country Songs (Billboard)	1
US Billboard Hot 100	5
US Adult Contemporary (Billboard)	5
Australia (Kent Music Report)	2
Canadian RPM Country Tracks	1
Canadian RPM Top Singles	17
New Zealand (Listener)	12
