= The Happiest Girl in the Whole U.S.A. (album) =

Studio album by Donna Fargo
- Released: May 1972
- Recorded: January–April 1972
- Studio: RCA Victor Studios (Nashville, Tennessee); Jack Clement Recording (Nashville, Tennessee)
- Genre: Country, Country pop
- Label: Dot
- Producer: Stan Silver

Donna Fargo chronology
The Happiest Girl in the Whole U.S.A. (1972)	My Second Album (1973)

Singles from The Happiest Girl in the Whole U.S.A.
- 1. "The Happiest Girl in the Whole U.S.A." Released: February 1972; 2. "Funny Face" Released: August 1972

The Happiest Girl in the Whole U.S.A. is the debut studio album by American country artist Donna Fargo. The album was released in May 1972 on Dot Records and was produced by Fargo's husband and manager Stan Silver. The album's title track became Fargo's first major hit and a crossover Country pop hit, reaching #1 on the Billboard country chart and the Top 20 on the Billboard Hot 100. The second single entitled "Funny Face" had similar success the same year. The Happiest Girl in the Whole U.S.A. is Donna Fargo's highest-selling album in the United States.

== Background and content ==
The Happiest Girl in the Whole U.S.A. was recorded in both January and April 1972 in Nashville, Tennessee, United States. The January session was recorded at the RCA Victor Studio and produced title track, "The Awareness of Nothing", and "How Close You Came (To Being Gone)". The April session was recorded at the Jack Clement Recording Studio and produced the rest of the album's tracks such as, "Funny Face", "Daddy Dumplin'", and "Society's Got Us". The Happiest Girl in the Whole U.S.A. contained Fargo's first recordings for the Dot label after previously recording for Challenge Records in 1969. Eight of the album's ten tracks were written entirely by Fargo, except the second track "Manhattan, Kansas" (Joe Allen) and a cover of Chuck Berry's "Johnny B. Goode", which was the closing track. The album was recorded in a traditional country music style whose themes were considered "cute" as well as a "biting satire of contemporary consumerism", according to Kurt Wolff of Country Music: The Rough Guide. Wolff also praised the track, "The Awareness of Nothing" for its "subtle threads of feminism".

The Happiest Girl in the Whole U.S.A. was first released on an LP record, with five tracks on the first side of the record and five tracks on the other side of the record. The album has not been reissued on a compact disc since its initial release in 1972.

== Release ==
The title track of The Happiest Girl in the Whole U.S.A. was the lead single released from the album in February 1972. The single became Fargo's first charting single and a major Country pop crossover hit in the United States and Canada, peaking at #1 on the Billboard Magazine Hot Country Singles chart, #11 on the Billboard Hot 100, #7 on the Billboard Hot Adult Contemporary Tracks chart, and #16 on the Canadian RPM Country Tracks chart. The fourth track entitled "Funny Face" was the album's second single in July 1972, becoming an even larger Country pop crossover hit. The song reached #1 on the Billboard Magazine Hot Country Singles chart, #5 on the Billboard Hot 100, #5 on the Hot Adult Contemporary Tracks chart, #1 on the Canadian RPM Country Tracks chart, and #17 on the RPM Top Singles chart. The Happiest Girl in the Whole U.S.A was officially released in May 1972 on Dot Records and peaked at #1 on the Billboard Top Country Albums chart, as well as #47 on the Billboard 200. In addition, it also reached #67 on the Canadian Top Albums chart. The Happiest Girl in the Whole U.S.A. was certified gold by the Recording Industry Association of America on January 29, 1973 for selling over 500,000 copies.

== Track listing ==
All songs composed by Donna Fargo, except where noted.

Side one

1. "The Happiest Girl in the Whole U.S.A." – 2:29
2. "Manhattan, Kansas" – (Joe Allen) 2:38
3. "The Awareness of Nothing" – 3:32
4. "Funny Face" – 2:46
5. "A Little Somethin' (To Hang on To)" – 2:25

Side two

1. "Daddy Dumplin'" – 2:24
2. "How Close You Came (To Being Gone)" – 3:12
3. "Society's Got Us" – 2:43
4. "It Would Have Been Just Perfect" – 2:55
5. "Johnny B. Goode" – (Chuck Berry) 2:48

== Chart positions ==
Album

Chart (1972)	Peak position
US Top Country Albums (Billboard)	1
US Top LPs (Billboard)	47
Australia (Kent Music Report)	24
Canadian RPM Top Albums	67

Singles

Year	Song	Peak chart positions					
Year	Song	US Country	US	US AC	Australia	CAN Country	CAN
1972	"The Happiest Girl in the Whole U.S.A."	1	11	7	3	16	—
1972	"Funny Face"	1	5	5	2	1	17
