= Mockin' Bird Hill =

Single by Patti Page

from the album Romance on the Range
- B-side: "I Love You Because"
- Released: 1951
- Recorded: 1950
- Genre: Traditional pop
- Length: 2:57
- Label: Mercury
- Composer: Calle Jularbo
- Lyricist: George Vaughn Horton

Patti Page singles chronology
"Would I Love You (Love You, Love You)" (1951)	"Mockin' Bird Hill" (1951)	"Ever True Ever More" (1951)

"Mockin' Bird Hill" is a song written in 3/4 time by Calle Jularbo, with lyrics by George Vaughn Horton. It is perhaps best known through recordings by Patti Page, Horton's own Pinetoppers, and the duo of Les Paul and Mary Ford in 1951, or by Donna Fargo's 1977 version, but many other artists have also recorded the song.

== Background ==
The music of "Mockin' Bird Hill" is based closely on a Swedish waltz called "Livet i Finnskogarna" ("Life in the Finn Woods"), recorded by Calle Jularbo in 1915, which enjoyed some popularity in the U.S. It also has close roots to another old Scandinavian waltz - a gammaldans called "Norska bondvals," or "Norwegian farmer's waltz." The first recording of the song was made by the Pinetoppers, a group consisting of George Vaughn Horton and his brother Roy Horton plus three other men: this recording, which featured a female duo billed as the Beaver Valley Sweethearts, was issued on Coral Records in October 1950. The first recording of "Mockin' Bird Hill" by an established act was made by Les Paul and Mary Ford, released as Capitol 1373 on January 29, 1951.

Patti Page soon recorded the song herself, believing that record buyers assumed that the Paul/Ford single was her own new release. Page first learned of "Mockin' Bird Hill" while at Midway Airport: having just completed a Chicago nightclub engagement she was awaiting a flight to New York City to stopover before proceeding to Florida to open at the Fontainebleau Miami Beach the next evening. Page received a phone call at Midway from Mercury Records a&r man Art Talmadge. At his request Page skipped her scheduled flight to allow Talmadge to reach Midway with a portable turntable, to play Page the Paul/Ford single, which Talmadge suggested Page record once she reached New York City. Page was reluctant to make a recording without the participation of her regular conductor, Jack Rael, who awaited Page in Florida; however, Talmadge had already cleared Page's recording of "Mockin' Bird Hill" with Rael and had booked studio time and musicians for Page to make the recording. Page recalled: "They had a limo at the airport [in New York City], took me to Bob Fine's studio. I cut just that one song. I was very happy with it and couldn't wait for Jack to hear it. He said 'This is really very good.' He called Art, and Art said 'I'm glad you like it, Jack, because we've already shipped 200,000 records."

The Page recording, made on January 17, 1951, was issued by Mercury Records as catalog number 5595, and first reached the Billboard pop music chart on February 24, 1951, lasting 22 weeks and peaking at number 2. At the same time Mercury released a recording, catalog number 5552 by Tiny Hill and the Hillsiders.

The Les Paul/Mary Ford recording was issued by Capitol Records as catalog number 1373, and also reached the number 2 spot on Billboard.

On the Cash Box best-selling record charts in which all recordings of a given song were combined, the song entered the chart on March 3, 1951; reached number 1 on April 21, 1951; and remained there through to the May 12, 1951, chart. It returned to the number 1 position on May 26.

Big Band orchestra leader Russ Morgan recorded the song in 1951 featuring the Gay Sisters on backing vocals. Slim Whitman also recorded two versions of the song.

"Mockingbird Hill" is also mentioned in "Spanish Bombs", a song by The Clash.

== Other original versions ==
- His Master's Voice 78 rpm record (E.A.3985) by Donald Peers with orchestra and chorus
- Columbia 78 rpm record (DB.2852) by Ronnie Ronalde with orchestra conducted by Arturo Steffani (Yodelling & Whistling by Ronnie Ronalde)
- And on CD by New Zealand Country Singer Pasty Riggir from her album "Moonlight And Roses" Copyright 1992 by Sony Music Entertainment New Zealand

== Cover versions ==
- The Tanner Sisters with Orchestra recorded their version in London on April 1, 1951. It was released by EMI on the His Master's Voice label as catalog number B 10071.
- Jean Shepard recorded a version of this song on the album Got You on My Mind (1961), (Capitol Records ST 1525). It was recorded on April 4, 1960, in Nashville, Tennessee.
- Also in 1960, Burl Ives recorded a version of this song, which was chosen to be the opening number for the album The Versatile Burl Ives! (Decca Records DL-(7)4152), which was released in 1961 and was the first of a series of Country & Western albums that Ives would do for Decca throughout the decade.
- In 1961, Teresa Brewer recorded a version of this song on the album "Songs Everybody Knows".
- The Migil Five sang a bluebeat tempo version of the song - a UK hit in 1964 reaching the No. 10 spot.
- George Jones and Gene Pitney covered the song on their 1965 collaboration album It's Country Time Again!.
- Ray Stevens recorded the song in 1975 for his mostly pop-standards cover album, Misty.
- Donna Fargo took a shortened country version to #9 on the Billboard Country Chart in 1977.
- Birthe Kjaer recorded a Danish version of the song in 1977.
- In 1979, Linda G. Thompson, formerly a singer with German disco group Silver Convention recorded a disco style version of the song.
- In 1993, Dutch group Roots Syndicate (nl:Roots Syndicate) released a reggae cover, which featured on an advertisement for Centraal Beheer in the early 1990s.
- The Swedish comedian Povel Ramel wrote a Swedish-language version of the song called Småfoglarne (The little birds), which contained a large number of puns on birds' names. It was performed and recorded by Ramel and Martin Ljung.
- Foster and Allen recorded the song in 2004 for their album By Special Request.
- Filipino actress and singer, Perla Adea, recorded the song under Vicor Records in the 1970s.
