= You Can't Be a Beacon If Your Light Don't Shine =

Single by Donna Fargo

from the album Miss Donna Fargo
- B-side: "Just a Friend of Mine"
- Released: May 1974
- Studio: Jack Clement Recording (Nashville, Tennessee)
- Genre: Country
- Length: 3:15
- Label: Dot
- Songwriter(s): Marty Cooper
- Producer(s): Stan Silver

Donna Fargo singles chronology
"I'll Try a Little Bit Harder" (1974)	"You Can't Be a Beacon If Your Light Don't Shine" (1974)	"US of A" (1974)

"You Can't Be a Beacon If Your Light Don't Shine" is a song written by Marty Cooper, and recorded by American country music artist Donna Fargo. It was released in May 1974 as the first single from the album Miss Donna Fargo. The song was Fargo's fifth number one on the U.S. country singles chart. The single spent a single week at number one and a total of eleven weeks on the chart.

== Chart performance ==
Chart (1974)	Peak position
US Hot Country Songs (Billboard)	1
US Billboard Hot 100	57
US Easy Listening (Billboard)	14
Australia (Kent Music Report)	70
Canadian RPM Country Tracks	1
Canadian RPM Top Singles	41
Canadian RPM Adult Contemporary Tracks	15
