= Dick Curless =

American country music singer (1932–1995)

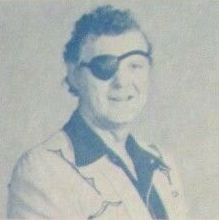
- Curless in August 1976

Background information
- Born: Richard William Curless; March 17, 1932; Fort Fairfield, Maine, U.S.
- Died: May 25, 1995 (aged 63) Togus, Maine, U.S.
- Genre: Country
- Occupation: Musician
- Instruments: Vocals; Guitar
- Years active: 1956–1995
- Labels: Capitol; Rounder

Dick Curless (March 17, 1932 – May 25, 1995) was an American-Canadian country music singer and guitarist known for his extensive vocal range, trademark eye patch, and songs about life on the road. Rising to fame with the 1965 hit "A Tombstone Every Mile," Curless built a loyal following with his blend of truck-driving country, folk ballads, and gospel music.

== Biography ==
Curless was born in Fort Fairfield, Maine, United States, and moved with his family to Massachusetts at the age of eight. He began his music career in 1948 in Ware, Massachusetts, where he hosted a radio show and toured with a local band called the Trail Blazers.

Curless married his wife, Pauline, in 1951, and only six months after the wedding, he was drafted into the United States Army. He served in the Korean War from 1952 to 1954, first as a truck driver and later as a radio host with the alias "Rice Paddy Ranger".

Curless returned home to Maine in 1954 and continued performing on radio shows, but he spent much of the following year, 1955, at home due to a chronic illness.

In 1956, Curless returned to the public spotlight with his own rendition of Streets of Laredo. In 1957, he appeared on the CBS television show Arthur Godfrey's Talent Scouts. He spent much of the late 1950s making what seems to be the world record of consecutive one night stands, ranging from Quebec, Canada all the way to Los Angeles, California. He occasionally returned home to recover from fatigue and chronic illness, caused by his intense addiction to alcohol. While in Maine, Curless recorded several singles, including "China Nights" (1957) at Event Records with Al Hawkes. Eventually he temporarily left the music industry and bought his own lumber trucking vehicle in Maine.

In 1965, Curless recorded the biggest hit of his career, "A Tombstone Every Mile", which cracked the top 5 on the Billboard country charts and propelled him to national fame. In 1966, he recorded the album A Devil Like Me Needs an Angel Like You with Kay Adams. From 1966 to 1968, he toured the nation with the Buck Owens All American Show. The pinnacle of his career came in the late 1960s with eleven top-40 hits, including "Six Times a Day (the Trains Came Down)", Travelin' Man, Big Foot, and lots of others. Altogether, he recorded 22 Billboard top-40 hits throughout his career.

After Curless' success in 1970 with the hits "Big Wheel Cannonball" and "Hard, Hard Traveling Man", he recorded infrequently until he released the albums Welcome to My World and It's Just a Matter of Time in Norway in 1987. The albums were successful in Europe, especially in Norway and Germany.

Curless recorded an album with German country musician Tom Astor in 1991. From 1992 all the way to his death, he performed often at the Cristy Lane Theater in Branson, Missouri.

Curless died of stomach cancer in 1995, aged 63.

== Discography ==
=== Albums ===
Year	Album	US Country	Label
1959	Songs of the Open Country	—	Tiffany
1961	Singing Just for Fun	—	Tiffany
1962	I Love to Tell the Story	—	Tiffany
1965	Tombstone Every Mile	12	Capitol
1965	Hymns	—	Capitol
1966	The Soul of Dick Curless	—	Tower
1966	Travelin' Man	—	Tower
1966	At Home with Dick Curless	—	Tower
1966	A Devil Like Me Needs an Angel Like You (w/ Kay Adams)	16	Tower
1967	All of Me Belongs to You	—	Tower
1967	Ramblin' Country	—	Tower
1968	The Long Lonesome Road	43	Tower
1968	The Wild Side of Town	—	Tower
1970	Hard, Hard Traveling Man	—	Capitol
1971	Doggin' It	42	Capitol
1971	Comin' On Country	43	Capitol
1972	Stonin' Around	—	Capitol
1973	Live at the Wheeling Truck Driver's Jamboree	37	Capitol
1973	The Last Blues Song	—	Capitol
1974	End of the Road	—	Hilltop
1987	Welcome to My World	—	Rocade (Norway)
1990	It's Just a Matter of Time	—	Rocade (Norway), Stetson (UK)
1995	Traveling Through	—	Rounder

=== Singles ===
Year	Single	Chart positions		Album						
Year	Single	US Country	CAN Country	Album	-	1965	"A Tombstone Every Mile"	5	—	A Tombstone Every Mile
"Six Times a Day (The Trains Came Down)"	12	—				1965				A Tombstone Every Mile
"'Tater Raisin' Man"	42	—	Travelin' Man			1965				
1966	"Travelin' Man"	44	Travelin' Man	—						
1966	"Highway Man"	—	—	single only						
1966	"A Devil Like Me Needs an Angel Like You" (w/ Kay Adams)	—	—	A Devil Like Me Needs an Angel Like You						
1966	"The Baron"	63	—	All of Me Belongs to You						
1967	"All of Me Belongs to You"	28	—	All of Me Belongs to You						
1967	"House of Memories"	72	—	All of Me Belongs to You						
1967	"Big Foot"	70	—	Ramblin' Country						
1968	"Bury the Bottle with Me"	55	—	The Long Lonesome Road						
1968	"I Ain't Got Nobody"	34	—	The Long Lonesome Road						
1968	"All I Need Is You"	—	—	single only						
1969	"The Wild Side of Town"	—	—	The Wild Side of Town						
1970	"Big Wheel Cannonball"	27	18	Hard, Hard Traveling Man						
1970	"Hard, Hard Traveling Man"	31	—	Hard, Hard Traveling Man						
1970	"Drag 'Em Off the Interstate, Sock It to 'Em, J.P. Blues"	29	—	Hard, Hard Traveling Man						
1971	"Juke Box Man"	41	—	Doggin' It						
1971	"Loser's Cocktail"	36	—	Comin' On Country						
1971	"Snap Your Fingers"	40	—	Comin' On Country						
1972	"January, April and Me"	34	—	Stonin' Around						
1972	"Stonin' Around"	31	35	Stonin' Around						
1972	"She Called Me Baby"	55	—	Stonin' Around						
1973	"Chick Inspector (That's Where My Money Goes)"	54	—	Live at the Wheeling Truck Driver's Jamboree						
1973	"China Nights (Shina No Yoru)"	80	—	Stonin' Around						
1973	"The Last Blues Song"	65	—	The Last Blues Song						
1974	"Swingin' Preacher"	—	—	The Last Blues Song						
1974	"Brand New Bed of Roses"	—	—	single only						
