= Superman (Donna Fargo song) =

Single by Donna Fargo

from the album My Second Album
- B-side: "Forever Is As Far As I Could Go"
- Released: December 1972
- Recorded: October 1972
- Studio: Jack Clement Recording (Nashville, Tennessee)
- Genre: Country
- Length: 2:27
- Label: Dot 17429
- Songwriter(s): Donna Fargo
- Producer(s): Stan Silver

Donna Fargo singles chronology
| "Funny Face" (1972) | "Superman" (1972) | "You Were Always There" (1973) |

"Superman" is a song written and recorded by American country music artist Donna Fargo. It was released in December 1972 as the first single from the album My Second Album.

The song was Fargo's third consecutive number one on the country chart. The single went to number one for a single week and spent a total of fourteen weeks on the country chart.

== Chart performance ==
| Chart (1972–1973) | Peak position |
|---|---|
| US Hot Country Songs (Billboard) | 1 |
| US Billboard Hot 100 | 41 |
| US Easy Listening (Billboard) | 35 |
| Australia (Kent Music Report) | 72 |
| Canadian RPM Country Tracks | 1 |
| Canadian RPM Top Singles | 75 |
