= Kay Adams (singer) =

American country music singer (born 1941)

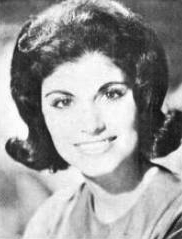
- Adams in 1966

Background information
- Born: Princetta Kay Adams; April 9, 1941 (age 85); Knox City, Texas, U.S.
- Origin: Vernon, Texas, U.S.
- Genre: Country
- Occupation: Singer
- Instrument: Vocals
- Years active: 1965–present
- Labels: Tower, Ovation, Capitol, Granite, Frontline

Princetta Kay Adams (born April 9, 1941) is an American country music singer.

== Biography ==
Kay Adams was born Princetta Kay Adams in Knox City, Texas, the fourth of five children to Charley Alva Adams (1908–1969) and Ola May Henson (1914–1993). Her father was a talented fiddle player. She moved at the age of 10, along with her family, to Vernon, Texas.

In the 1960s, Adams arrived on the country scene with the songs "Six Days a Waiting," "Old Heart Get Ready," "Anymore," "Don't Talk Trouble To Me," "Trapped," "Roll Out The Red Carpet," "I Cried At Your Wedding," "Honky Tonk Heartache" and "She Didn't Color Daddy." She appeared as a regular on such Bakersfield based country music TV programs as Buck Owens' Ranch and the Dave Stogner Show.

At the inaugural Academy of Country Music Awards, in 1965, Adams was named Top New Female Vocalist. Merle Haggard was named Top New Male Vocalist, while Top Male Vocalist and Top Female Vocalist went to Buck Owens and Bonnie Owens. The following year, Adams was nominated for Top Female Vocalist.

Before 1966, women never recorded songs about truck driving. Adams, however, had a hit that year with "Little Pink Mack," a song giving the point of view of a woman driver, which is the only song on the album by a woman. In the song her truck has chrome and it "has polka-dot curtains hangin' in the sleeper," but is the fastest big-wheeler on the road. In her "truck drivin' boots" she stands about five-foot three, but she can take care of herself. With a full-force Bakersfield sound twangy Telecaster and some fuzz-tone steel guitar backing, she delivers the story of a truck driving woman who makes it clear she "cut my baby teeth on a set of Spicer gears. I’m a gear-swappin’ mama, and I don’t know the meaning of fear." All the truckers are asked, "Who's the gal in the little pink Mack?"

It was just a couple years before Tammy Wynette sang the praises of standing by one’s man, and a decade before Loretta Lynn celebrated reproductive freedom in her controversial hit, "The Pill," but country singer Kay Adams demolished at least one gender stereotype in 1966 with her hit single "Little Pink Mack."

Adams's vocal style carried much of Wanda Jackson’s sassy, husky-throated rockabilly abandon, a hint of Wynette’s lovelorn sob and a sense of Connie Smith’s emotional openness.

Adams was married first to Robert W. Willard, in 1958. They were divorced in 1967 at Bakersfield. She and her second husband also divorced. She married for a third time, to songwriter Buck Moore. She and Willard had two sons, Daniel Ray Willard (born December 19, 1959) and Stewart Wayne Willard (born December 16, 1961).

Her 1966 album A Devil Like Me Needs An Angel Like You, was a duo with singer Dick Curless. She also sang on the soundtrack-album of the western movie Killers Three (|1968), which also featured Merle Haggard and Bonnie Owens. In the 1970s, she recorded "I Never Got to Nashville" for Cliffie Stone's Granite Records. Most recently she recorded "Mama Was A Rock (Daddy Was A Rolling Stone)" in 1996 with BR5-49 for the compilation CD Rig Rock Deluxe: A Musical Salute To The American Truck Driver, and "Trixie's Diesel-Stop Cafe" with The Dixie Bee-Liners on their 2009 bluegrass concept album Susanville.

Kay Adams's albums include A Devil Like Me Needs An Angel Like You, Wheels And Tears, Make Mine Country, and Alcohol And Tears.

== Discography ==
=== Albums ===
List of albums, with selected chart positions, showing other relevant details
Title	Album details	Peak chart positions
Title	Album details	US Country
A Devil Like Me Needs an Angel Like You (with Dick Curless)	Released: April 1966; Label: Tower; Formats: Vinyl	16
Wheels and Tears	Released: September 1966; Label: Tower; Formats: Vinyl	36
Make Mine Country	Released: May 1967; Label: Tower; Formats: Vinyl	—
Alcohol and Tears	Released: November 1967; Label: Tower; Formats: Vinyl	—
Made for Love	Released: 1978; Label: Frontline/Randall; Formats: Vinyl	—
"—" denotes releases that did not chart

=== Singles ===
List of singles, with selected chart positions, showing other relevant details
Title	Year	Peak chart positions	Album
Title	Year	US Country	Album
"Don't Talk About Trouble to Me"	1965	—	Make Mine Country
"Roll Out the Carpet"	1966	—	Make Mine Country
"A Devil Like Me Needs an Angel Like You" (with Dick Curless)	1966	—	A Devil Like Me Needs an Angel Like You
"Anymore"	1966	—	Make Mine Country
"Little Pink Mack"	1966	30	Wheels and Tears
"Where Did the Good Times Go"	1966	—	—N/a
"Trapped"	1967	—	Make Mine Country
"Six Days A-Waitin'"	1967	—	Wheels and Tears
"Husband Stealer"	1967	—	Alcohol Tears
"Big Mac"	1968	—	Wheels and Tears
"Gonna Have a Good Time"	1968	—	—N/a
"Good Morning Love"	1969	—	—N/a
"Let George Do It"	1970	—	—N/a
"Step Aside Girl"	1973	—	—N/a
"Hearts of Stone"	1973	—	—N/a
"Reason to Feel"	1973	—	—N/a
"I Never Got to Nashville"	1975	—	—N/a
"Country Dreamer"	1975	—	—N/a
"You Show Me Yours and I'll Show You Mine"	1978	—	Made for Love
"—" denotes releases that did not chart

== See also ==
- Academy of Country Music
- List of country music performers
