= Calle Jularbo =

Swedish accordionist

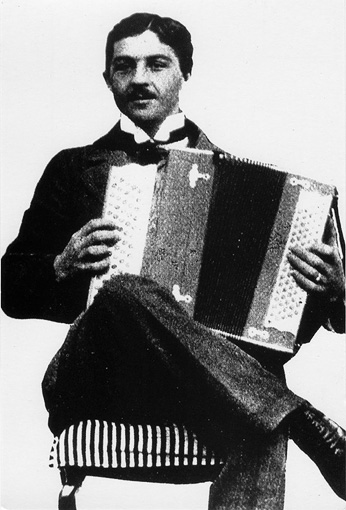
Carl Jularbo (photograph probably from the 1920s)

Carl Jularbo, better known as Calle Jularbo (born Karl Karlsson; 6 June 1893 – 13 February 1966), was a Swedish accordionist and musician. He had a distinct personal style that has played a significant part in forming the Swedish accordion tradition. He recorded 1,577 tunes and he won 158 accordion competitions. He maintained a large repertoire without being able to read music. His best known tune is Livet i Finnskogarna ('Life In the Forest Finns'), recorded in 1915. This song was the basis for the Les Paul and Mary Ford hit of 1951, "Mockin' Bird Hill".

Jularbo is the name of his birthplace, which he later adopted as his name. Both his parents were of predominantly Romani descent, which was not revealed until after his death.

== Literature ==
- Stig Nahlbom (1974), "Jularbo, Carl Oscar", Svenskt biografiskt lexikon, 20:458-9460.
