= Do I Love You (Yes in Every Way) =

1971 single by Paul Anka

Single by Paul Anka

from the album Paul Anka
- B-side: "So Long City"
- Released: September 1971
- Recorded: 1971
- Genre: Easy listening
- Label: Buddah
- Songwriters: Paul Anka, Alain Joseph Yves Le Govic, Maxime Piolot, Michel Albert Louis Pelay and Yves Dessca

Paul Anka singles chronology
"Happy" (1969)	"Do I Love You" (1971)	"Jubilation" (1972)

"Do I Love You (Yes in Every Way)"

Single by Donna Fargo

from the album Shame on Me
- B-side: "Dee Dee"
- Released: December 1977
- Recorded: 1977
- Genre: Country
- Label: Warner Bros.
- Songwriters: Paul Anka, Alain Joseph Yves Le Govic, Maxime Piolot, Michel Albert Louis Pelay and Yves Dessca

Donna Fargo singles chronology
"Shame on Me" (1977)	"Do I Love You (Yes in Every Way)" (1977)	"Raga Muffin Man" (1978)

"Do I Love You" is a song co-written and recorded by Paul Anka, from his 1972 eponymous LP. Released as an advance single in late 1971, "Do I Love You" reached number 14 on the Easy Listening Singles charts of both the U.S. and Canada, number 16 on the Canadian Pop chart, and was a modest hit on the U.S. Hot 100 as well. As with the earlier "My Way", it was adapted from a French-language song ("Plus rien qu'une adresse en commun") popularized by Claude François, and Anka composed the English lyrics.

== Donna Fargo cover ==
"Do I Love You (Yes in Every Way)" was covered by American country music artist Donna Fargo and released as the second single from her album Shame on Me in December 1977. The song peaked at number 2 on the Billboard Hot Country Singles chart for two weeks. It also reached number 1 on the RPM Country Tracks chart in Canada.

== Chart performance ==
Paul Anka

Chart (1971–72)	Peak position
Canada RPM Adult Contemporary	14
Canada RPM Top Singles	16
US Billboard Hot 100	53
US Adult Contemporary (Billboard)	14
US Cash Box Top 100	38

Donna Fargo

Chart (1977–78)	Peak position
Canadian RPM Country Tracks	1
US Hot Country Songs (Billboard)	2
US Adult Contemporary (Billboard)	45
US Cash Box Top 100	94

== Later versions ==
- Anka himself recorded a number of versions. In 2012, he re-recorded the song as a duet with Dolly Parton for his album Duets. He also recorded the song with his daughter, Anthea. She recorded a Spanish version as well.
