= Ray Smith (country singer) =

American singer-songwriter

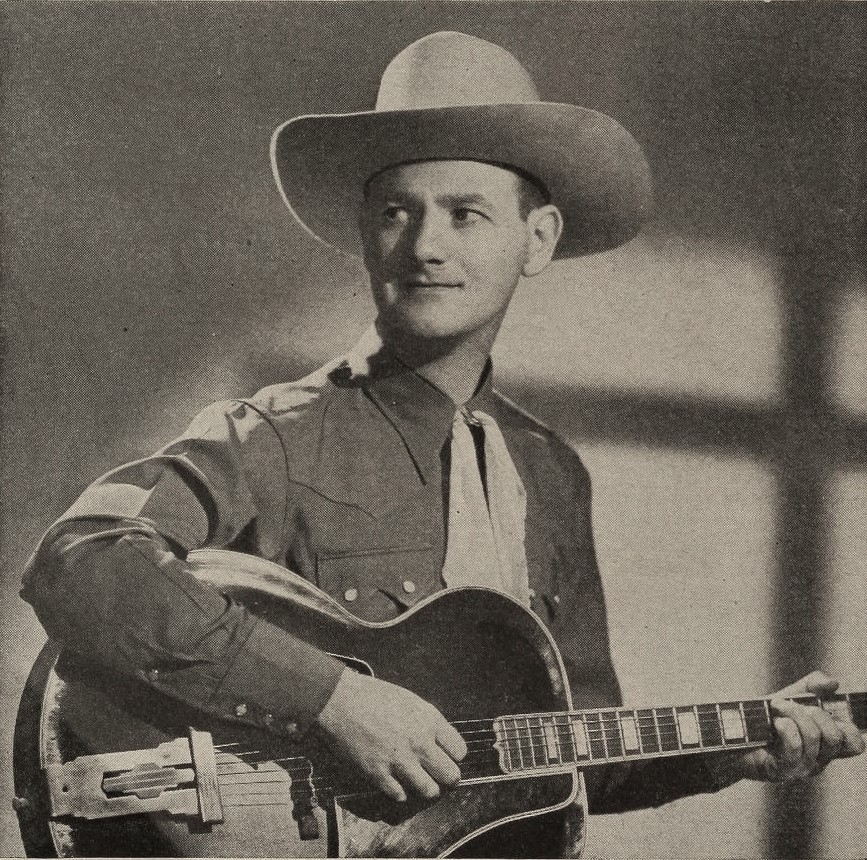
Ray Smith, 1953

Ray Smith (June 25, 1918 – December 4, 1979) was an American country music artist.

Born in Glendale, California, Smith began playing guitar at age eight. He joined a traveling rodeo show as a musician, and then took a job performing for radio station WMCA in New York City. He performed locally with a trio in New York, and also worked in Boston on WCOP's Hayloft Jamboree.

While in New York he was offered a contract recording with Columbia Records, and went on to record for London, and Coral as well. He also appeared on Dumont Television.

He died in 1979 at age 61.
