= On the Move (Donna Fargo album) =

Studio album by Donna Fargo
- Released: 1976
- Recorded: January 1976
- Studio: Columbia (Nashville, Tennessee); Quadrafonic Sound (Nashville, Tennessee)
- Genre: Country
- Label: Warner Bros.
- Producer: Stan Silver

Donna Fargo chronology
Whatever I Say Means I Love You (1975)	On the Move (1976)	The Best of Donna Fargo (1977)

Singles from On the Move
- 1. "Mr. Doodles" Released: March 1976; 2. "I've Loved You All of the Way" Released: July 1976

Professional ratings
Review scores
Source	Rating
Allmusic	2/5 stars

On the Move is the sixth studio album released by American country artist Donna Fargo. The album was released in 1976 on Warner Bros. Records and was produced by Fargo's husband and manager Stan Silver. It was Fargo's first album released on the Warner Bros. label, after recording five studio albums for Dot Records between 1972 and 1975.

== Background and content ==
On the Move was recorded in January 1976 at the Columbia Recording Studios and the Quadrafonic Sound Studios in Nashville, Tennessee. The session was Fargo's first recordings for Warner Bros. Records. Fargo's previous label Dot Records was financially unstable and instead, Warner Bros. offered her a seven figure sum to record for the label. On the Move was originally issued as an LP record with five songs contained on each side of the album.

== Release ==
On the Move spawned two singles in 1976. The lead single from the album and the opening track entitled "Mr. Doodles" was released in 1976, peaking at #20 on the Billboard Magazine Hot Country Singles chart and #40 on the Canadian RPM Country Singles chart. The second and final single spawned was "I've Loved You All of the Way" in July 1976. The song reached #15 on the Billboard country singles chart and did not chart the Canadian country chart. On the Move was released in mid 1976 and peaked at #31 on the Billboard Magazine Top Country Albums chart, Fargo's lowest-peaking album on the chart up to that point.

The title of the album can literally refer to Fargo being "on the move" according to Greg Adams of Allmusic, as he related the album title to her transition from Dot Records to Warner Bros. Records. Adams noted the song "I've Loved You All of the Way"'s vocal resemblance to "Dolly Parton meets Joan Rivers". Adams retrospectively gave the album two out of five stars stating, "On the Move is a fair album, but the caliber of songwriting is not up to Fargo's usual standards."

== Track listing ==
Side one

1. "Mr. Doodles"
2. "Song with No Music"
3. "I've Loved You All of the Way"
4. "Southern Lady"
5. "If You Can't Love All of Me"

Side two

1. "(I Wanna) Sing for My Supper"
2. "Patches"
3. "Country Girl"
4. "Nothing Good Comes Easy"
5. "One of God's Children"

== Sales chart positions ==
Album

Chart (1976)	Peak position
U.S. Top Country Albums	31

Singles

Year	Song	Chart positions	
Year	Song	US Country	CAN Country
1976	"Mr. Doodles"	20	40
1976	"I've Loved You All of the Way"	15	—
"—" denotes releases that did not chart
