= The Happiest Girl in the Whole U.S.A. (song) =

Single by Donna Fargo

from the album The Happiest Girl in the Whole U.S.A.
- B-side: "The Awareness of Nothing"
- Released: March 1972
- Recorded: January 1972
- Studio: RCA Studio B (Nashville, Tennessee)
- Genre: Country, Pop
- Length: 2:30
- Label: Dot
- Songwriter: Donna Fargo
- Producer: Stan Silver

Donna Fargo singles chronology
"The Happiest Girl in the Whole U.S.A." (1972)	"Funny Face" (1972)

"The Happiest Girl in the Whole USA" is a country and pop music song written, composed, and recorded by Donna Fargo. It is written in the voice of a newlywed girl, sung to her new husband. It has since become her signature song.

== Background ==
Fargo told Tom Roland in The Billboard Book of Number One Country Hits that she wrote the song with a different title originally. "It really started out to be 'Happiest Girl in the World,' but the rhyme scheme got to be too unnatural, so I changed it to 'U.S.A.' It kind of wrote itself after that."

== Critical reception ==
In 2024, Rolling Stone ranked the song at number 97 on its 200 Greatest Country Songs of All Time ranking.

== Commercial performance ==
The song, Fargo's first single on Dot Records, became a No. 1 country hit in the spring of 1972, and subsequently became a hit on the Billboard Hot 100 pop music chart, peaking at No. 11, and Billboard Easy Listening Singles chart, where it reached No. 7. Billboard ranked it as the No. 55 song for 1972. The record earned Fargo a Grammy for Best Country Vocal Performance, Female, at the 15th Annual Grammy Awards on March 3, 1973.

== Notable cover interpretations ==
- Tammy Wynette - on her 1972 album My Man.
- Nancy Sinatra - for the album Woman.
- Tanya Tucker also recorded the song in 1972 for her first album Delta Dawn. Her producer, Billy Sherrill, had planned for it to be her first single, but Tucker convinced him to allow her to record and release "Delta Dawn" instead.
- Actress Daveigh Chase sang it in a 2007 episode of the HBO television series Big Love.
- On April 15, 2012, a video of Lana Del Rey performing the song at a gig in 2009 was uploaded to YouTube.

== Charts ==
Chart (1972)	Peak position
US Billboard Hot 100	11
US Billboard Hot Country Singles	1
US Adult Contemporary (Billboard)	7
Australia (Kent Music Report)	3
Canadian RPM Country Tracks	16
New Zealand (Listener)	18
