= Donna Fargo =

American country singer (born 1945)

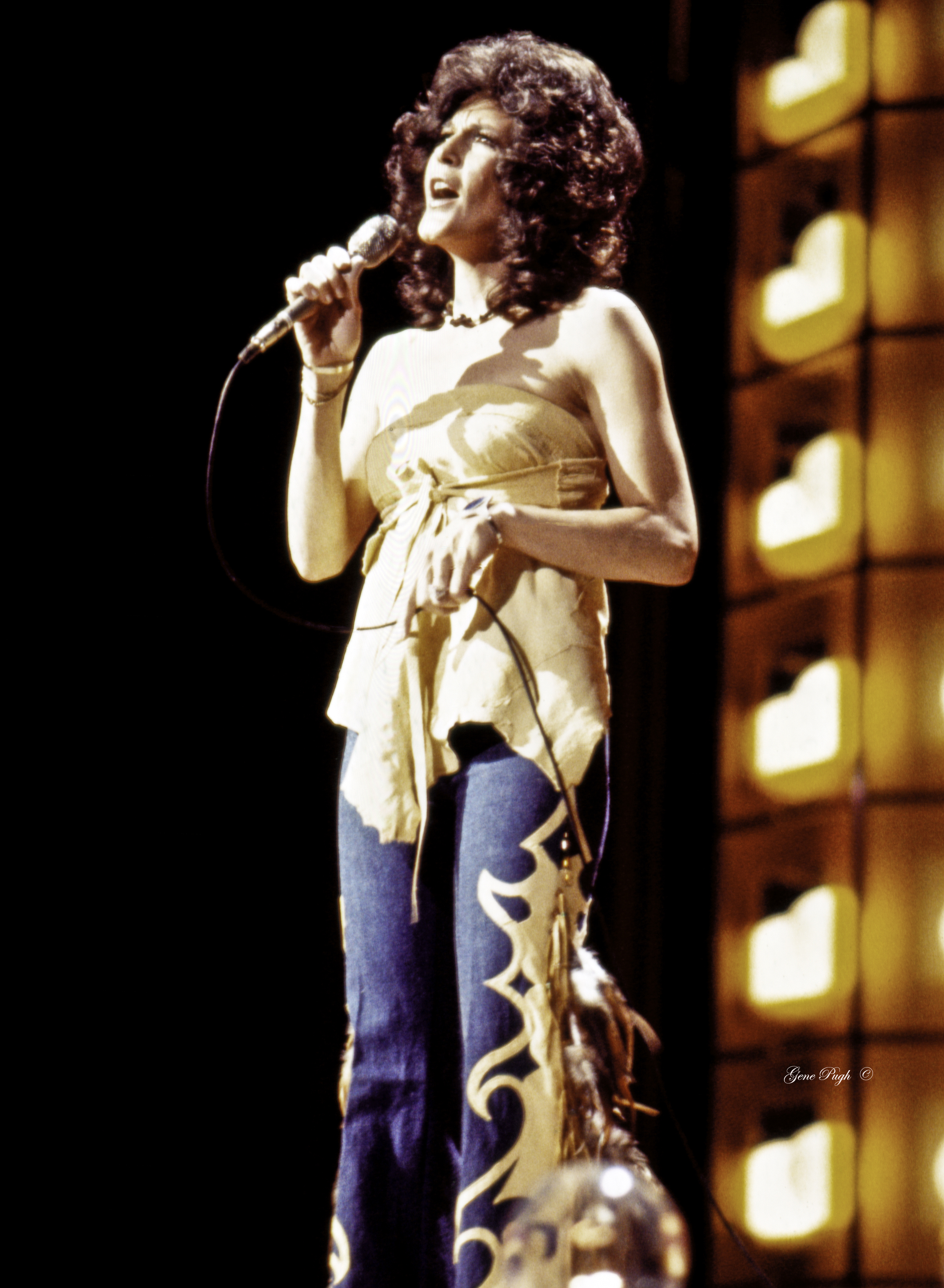
- Fargo performing in 1978

Background information
- Born: Yvonne Vaughn; November 10, 1945 (age 81)
- Origin: Mount Airy, North Carolina, U.S.
- Genre: Country pop
- Occupations: Singer, songwriter
- Instruments: Vocals, guitar
- Years active: 1967–present
- Labels: Challenge Records; Dot; Warner Bros. SongBird; RCA; Mercury Nashville; Cleveland; Ramco Records

Donna Fargo (born Yvonne Vaughn; November 10, 1945) is an American country singer-songwriter known for a series of Top 10 country hits in the 1970s. These include "The Happiest Girl In The Whole U.S.A." and "Funny Face", both of which were released in 1972 and became crossover pop hits that year.

Fargo has won major awards since her debut in the late 1960s, including one Grammy Award, five awards from the Academy of Country Music and one award from the Country Music Association.

== Biography ==
=== Early life ===
Fargo was born Yvonne Vaughn on November 10, 1945, in Mount Airy, North Carolina. She sang from her early years, but never thought about singing professionally. Fargo attended High Point College in North Carolina, then earned a degree at the University of Southern California (USC). After graduating from USC, she became a teacher at Northview High School in Covina, California, eventually progressing to head of the English Department. While still teaching, Fargo started pursuing a music career, performing in local clubs in Southern California. In 1966 she met Stan Silver who became her manager and, in 1968, her husband.

=== Career discovery ===
Vaughn soon started to appear around Los Angeles, California, while teaching. She went to Phoenix in 1966 and adopted the name Donna Fargo, which she has continued to use since. As Donna Fargo, Vaughn recorded her second single, which was also her first using her new stage name. (When she had recorded her first single, Fargo had used her real name of Yvonne Vaughn.) Her first major concert was with Ray Price, and she began playing in Southern California.

She recorded for a few small labels in the early 1960s, including Ramco and Challenge, but songs like "Who's Been Sleeping on My Side of the Bed" were not successful. Although her original singles were not successful, the Academy of Country Music Awards named her the "Top New Female Vocalist" in 1969. In 1972, Fargo recorded a single for the Decca label before achieving her breakthrough that year.

== Music career ==
In 1972, one of Fargo's self-written and self-composed songs, "The Happiest Girl In The Whole U.S.A.", was picked up by Dot Records. Fargo was then signed to the label, and the single was released the same year. She was one of the few female country singers to write and compose her own material at the time, and one of the few country singers to cross over to the Billboard Hot 100 pop chart in a big way, which she did in 1972 with "The Happiest Girl In The Whole U.S.A." (number 11). The song peaked at No. 1 on the country music chart. An album of the same name was released following the song's success. The album was certified gold by the RIAA in early 1973, selling over 500,000 copies. The follow-up single, "Funny Face", also peaked at No. 1 on the country chart, and became a bigger pop hit than her previous single, peaking at No. 5. Both singles were certified gold by the end of the year.

Though Fargo never made the Top 40 in pop music again, she placed over a dozen more singles in the country Top Ten in the 1970s, most written by herself. Fargo's second album, My Second Album, was released in 1973, peaking at No. 1 on the Top Country Albums chart, as well as spawning the No. 1 country singles, "Superman" and "You Were Always There". The songs both charted on the pop chart. That same year, Fargo's All About Feeling, her third album, was released. The album spawned two Top 10 Country hits "Little Girl Gone" and "I'll Try a Little Bit Harder". The same year, the Grammy Awards gave Fargo the Best Female Country Vocal Performance award for "The Happiest Girl In The Whole U.S.A." She was also named "Top Female Vocalist" by the Academy of Country Music Awards.

Fargo ultimately became the fifth most successful female country artist of the 1970s, according to Billboard Magazine, behind Loretta Lynn, Dolly Parton, Tammy Wynette, and Lynn Anderson. For a better part of the 1970s, she rated high on the charts with songs like "It Do Feel Good", and "Mr. Doodles".

Fargo had another successful album with Dot in 1974, releasing Miss Donna Fargo, which spawned three Top 10 hits, including "You Can't Be a Beacon If Your Light Don't Shine". This song peaked at No. 1 on the Billboard Country Chart. In 1975, she released Whatever I Say Means I Love You, her fifth and final album for Dot, which included "What Will the New Year Bring?"

Dot Records was acquired by ABC and there was a noticeable drop-off in chart placings for Fargo, and in 1976, she moved to Warner Bros. Records. Fargo came out with the On the Move album, which spawned two Top 20 hits. The next year her next album, Fargo Country was released. The album spawned her first No. 1 Country hit since 1974, "That Was Yesterday", followed by another Top 10 Country hit, "Mockingbird Hill", which peaked at No. 9 on the Billboard Country Chart in 1977. Fargo's 1978 album, Shame on Me also yielded two Top 10 hits, the title track and "Do I Love You (Yes in Every Way)", which peaked at No. 2.

Recognized as one of the leading country songwriters of the era, Fargo's songs have been recorded by Tammy Wynette, Sonny James, Kitty Wells, Tanya Tucker, Jody Miller, Marty Robbins, Dottie West and other artists. Additionally, for years she wrote almost everything that she recorded, although by the latter half of the 1970s she was also recording covers of songs from writers as diverse as Stonewall Jackson, Vaughn Horton, Bill Enis and Lawton Williams, Paul Anka, and Barry Mann and Cynthia Weil; those covers also became successful hits for Fargo.

Fargo had her own musical television show (produced by the Osmond Brothers), which ran for a year, beginning in 1978. Fargo is one of only five country female vocalists to have her own television series. Kitty Wells was the first, in 1968.

=== 1979: multiple sclerosis ===
In 1978, Fargo was diagnosed with multiple sclerosis. She experienced a brief illness, but with medical treatment and her husband's help, Fargo made it back to full health, returning to a more limited schedule in 1979 and another Top 10 hit. For the next few years, the successes came at a lower level. Although this serious neurological illness caused a deep decline in her promotional work, Fargo vowed not to allow the disease ultimately to get to her. In 1979, she recorded a new album, Just for You, from which the biggest hit was the No. 14 hit "Daddy", a new version of a song that Fargo had recorded in 1969. The follow-up, "Preacher Berry", peaked outside the Country Top 40.

=== 1980 – present: current music career ===
Fargo released one more album with Warner Bros. in 1980 before switching to the smaller Songbird label in 1981. She recorded a well-received gospel album in 1981 for MCA/Songbird, and in 1982, she moved to RCA. Fargo singles charted off RCA in 1983 and 1984, and she recorded one album for the label in 1983. She recorded a single for Columbia in 1983, and for Cleveland records in 1984. By now, Fargo's career had begun to decline in terms of album sales and chart placements. After several other label changes, Fargo signed with Mercury, and began another upswing. She recorded an album with the label, Winners, which resulted in three singles spawned from the album, including a Top 30 hit, "Me and You". Fargo also dueted with Billy Joe Royal for her next single, "Members Only". The song became a Top 25 country hit in 1987, peaking at No. 23. In 1991, she released the song "Soldier Boy", a reference to the Gulf War which was going on at the time. The song was Fargo's last charting single. After several years without a full-length recording, in 1992, Fargo began work on her autobiography. In 2008, Fargo released a new single CD, "We Can Do Better in America". On February 4, 2022, PrimaDonna Records announced the release of Donna Fargo's new EP, All Because of You.

== Writing career ==
Fargo has pursued other ventures outside of the music business, writing eight books and more than 2,000 greeting cards. She has since established a successful line of greeting cards in The Donna Fargo Collection through the Blue Mountain Arts Poets and Artists series. She released her fourth book in March 2010, entitled I Thanked God For You Today. Previously, Fargo had released another series of poetry books, including Trust in Yourself, To the Love of My Life, and Ten Golden Rules. In 2021, she published her eighth book, "Everything Is Possible with God", also with Blue Mountain Arts.

== Awards ==
Year	Award Program	Award
1969	Academy of Country Music Awards	Top New Female Vocalist
1972	Academy of Country Music Awards	Top Female Vocalist
1972	Academy of Country Music Awards	Song of the Year; "The Happiest Girl in the Whole USA"
1972	Academy of Country Music Awards	Single of the Year; "The Happiest Girl in the Whole USA"
1972	Academy of Country Music Awards	Album of the Year; The Happiest Girl in the Whole USA
1972	Country Music Association Awards	Single of the Year; "The Happiest Girl in the Whole USA"
1972	Music City News Awards	Most Promising Female Vocalist
1973	Grammy Awards	Best Female Country Vocal Performance; "The Happiest Girl in the Whole USA"
1973	Billboard Awards	Top All-Around Female Vocalist-Songwriter
1973	BMI Awards	Song of the Year

Additional nominations:

Country Music Association – 1972 – Female Vocalist of the Year
Country Music Association – 1972 – Song of the Year – "The Happiest Girl in the Whole USA"
Grammy Awards – 1973 – Best Country Song – "The Happiest Girl in the Whole USA"
Grammy Awards – 1973 – Best Country Song – "Funny Face"
Country Music Association – 1973 – Female Vocalist of the Year

Fargo was inducted into the North Carolina Music Hall of Fame in 2010.
