= List of RPM number-one country singles of 1972 =

These are the Canadian number-one country songs of 1972, per the RPM Country Tracks chart.

Issue date	Title	Artist
January 8	Mile After Mile	Orval Prophet
January 15	Mile After Mile	Orval Prophet
January 22	Mile After Mile	Orval Prophet
January 29	There Ain't No Easy Way	Eddie Chwill
February 5	One's on the Way	Loretta Lynn
February 12	I Can't See Me Without You	Conway Twitty
February 19	Bedtime Story	Tammy Wynette
February 26	It's Four in the Morning	Faron Young
March 4	Cotton Jenny	Anne Murray
March 11	Ann (Don't Go Runnin')	Tommy Overstreet
March 18	Good Hearted Woman	Waylon Jennings
March 25	Cry	Lynn Anderson
April 1	All His Children	Charley Pride
April 8	My Hang-Up Is You	Freddie Hart
April 15	A Thing Called Love	Johnny Cash
April 22	Smiling Wine	Shirley Eikhard
April 29	Smiling Wine	Shirley Eikhard
May 6	Moon-Man Newfie	Stompin' Tom Connors
May 13	Chantilly Lace	Jerry Lee Lewis
May 20	Nothin' Shakin' (But the Leaves on the Trees)	Billy "Crash" Craddock
May 27	Together Again	Hank Smith
June 3	(Lost Her Love) On Our Last Date	Conway Twitty
June 10	(Lost Her Love) On Our Last Date	Conway Twitty
June 17	Made In Japan	Buck Owens
June 24	Kate	Johnny Cash
July 1	Sing Happy	Dianne Leigh
July 8	That's Why I Love You Like I Do	Sonny James
July 15	Eleven Roses	Hank Williams, Jr.
July 22	Reach Out Your Hand (And Touch Somebody)	Tammy Wynette
July 29	It's Gonna Take a Little Bit Longer	Charley Pride
August 5	Listen to a Country Song	Lynn Anderson
August 12	Loving You Could Never Be Better	George Jones
August 19	Testing 1–2–3	Joyce Seamone
August 26	I'm Gonna Knock on Your Door	Billy "Crash" Craddock
September 2	There's a Party Goin' On	Jody Miller
September 9	Woman (Sensuous Woman)	Don Gibson
September 16	I Can't Stop Loving You	Conway Twitty
September 23	I Can't Stop Loving You	Conway Twitty
September 30	When the Snow Is on the Roses	Sonny James
October 7	Oney	Johnny Cash
October 14	I Ain't Never	Mel Tillis
October 21	Baby, Don't Get Hooked on Me	Mac Davis
October 28	Funny Face	Donna Fargo
November 4	My Man (Understands)	Tammy Wynette
November 11	It's Not Love (But It's Not Bad)	Merle Haggard
November 18	She's Too Good to Be True	Charley Pride
November 25	She's Too Good to Be True	Charley Pride
December 2	Got the All Overs For You (All Over Me)	Freddie Hart
December 9	She's Too Good to Be True	Charley Pride
December 16	Fool Me	Lynn Anderson
December 23	Fool Me	Lynn Anderson
December 30	You Are What I Am	Gordon Lightfoot

== See also ==
- 1972 in music
- List of number-one country hits of 1972 (U.S.)
