= 1972 in country music =

This is a list of notable events in country music that took place in the year 1972.

== Events ==
- March — For the first time since 1967, Sonny James fails to hit the No. 1 spot on Billboard's Hot Country Singles Chart with a single release. His hit, "Only Love (Can Break a Heart)" stops at No. 2. James' record streak would hold for more than 14 years, until Alabama scored its 17th-straight with "40 Hour Week (For a Livin')" in August 1985. "The Southern Gentleman" would return to the No. 1 spot twice more during 1972 — "That's Why I Love You Like I Do" (a retitled remake of his 1957 hit, "You're the Reason I'm in Love," the lesser-known flip side of "Young Love"; and also his last major hit with Capitol Records); and "When the Snow is on the Roses."

During 1972, James inks a recording deal with Columbia Records; "When the Snow..." is his first hit with his new label.

- March — Merle Haggard is pardoned by California Gov. Ronald Reagan for his 1957 robbery; which had landed him a prison term that lasted two-and-a-half years.
- April — The first Fan Fair is held in Nashville, Tennessee.
- June 3 — The Opryland USA country music theme park opens in Nashville.
- June 13 — The Country Music Foundation Library and Media Center is dedicated.
- September — The premiere issue of Country Music magazine hits the newsstand. The magazine, which will be issued monthly (later bi-monthly), is an immediate hit with critics and readers.
- September 17 — Faron Young — who has international success with "It's Four in the Morning" — is charged with assault for spanking a girl in the audience at a concert in Clarksburg, West Virginia after claiming she spat on him. Young appeared before a Wood County, West Virginia justice of the peace and was fined $24, plus $11 in court costs. It is the first in a string of incidents involving Young, whose increasingly bizarre behavior would begin overshadowing his success.
- October — The Country Music Association moves from NBC to CBS, where it remained until 2006 when the awards show moved to ABC. Loretta Lynn becomes the first woman to win the CMA's Entertainer of the Year award.

=== No dates ===
- The Nitty Gritty Dirt Band, a California-based country-folk-rock band, releases their landmark album Will the Circle Be Unbroken. The album of folk and country standards, recorded in Nashville alongside traditional country artists, is a huge critical and commercial success. Two additional volumes would be released in 1989 and 2002.
- Music and Billboard chart historian Joel Whitburn releases "Top Country Songs 1944–1971." The book, published by Record Research, marks the first time a listing of every song and artist that had ever appeared by means of a country and western hit parade had been compiled into a single volume. Eight more updated volumes will follow (the most recent edition covers through 2017), as well as two editions focusing on strictly those songs reaching the Top 40 (the original released in 1996, and an updated version in 2006).
- Buck Owens returns to his musical roots when Jerry Brightman is added on pedal steel for records and tours.
- A class of new artists proves to be among the most prolific of the 1970s. Singers Donna Fargo, Johnny Rodriguez, Joe Stampley, Mel Street and Tanya Tucker, and harmonica player Charlie McCoy each have their first major hits during 1972 and would be among the most successful of the newcomers.

== Top hits of the year ==
=== Number one hits ===
==== United States ====
(as certified by Billboard)

Date	Single Name	Artist	Wks. No.1	CAN peak	Spec. Note
January 8	Would You Take Another Chance on Me	Jerry Lee Lewis	1	2
January 15	Carolyn	Merle Haggard	3	2
February 5	One's on the Way	Loretta Lynn	2
February 19	It's Four in the Morning	Faron Young	2		^{[B]}
March 4	Bedtime Story	Tammy Wynette	1
March 11	My Hang-Up Is You	Freddie Hart	6		^{[1]}
April 22	Chantilly Lace	Jerry Lee Lewis	3		^{[B]}
May 13	Grandma Harp	Merle Haggard	2	5
May 27	(Lost Her Love) On Our Last Date	Conway Twitty	1
June 3	The Happiest Girl in the Whole U.S.A.	Donna Fargo	3	16	^{[A]}
June 24	That's Why I Love You Like I Do	Sonny James	1
July 1	Eleven Roses	Hank Williams, Jr.	2
July 15	Made in Japan	Buck Owens	1
July 22	It's Gonna Take a Little Bit Longer	Charley Pride	3
August 12	Bless Your Heart	Freddie Hart	2	4
August 26	If You Leave Me Tonight I'll Cry	Jerry Wallace	2	3	^{[2], [C]}: Returned to Number One on September 9.
September 2	Woman (Sensuous Woman)	Don Gibson	1		^{[B]}
September 16	When the Snow Is on the Roses	Sonny James	1
September 23	I Can't Stop Loving You	Conway Twitty	1
September 30	I Ain't Never	Mel Tillis	2		^{[A]}
October 14	Funny Face	Donna Fargo	3
November 4	It's Not Love (But It's Not Bad)	Merle Haggard	1
November 11	My Man (Understands)	Tammy Wynette	1
November 18	She's Too Good to Be True	Charley Pride	3
December 9	Got the All Overs for You (All Over Me)	Freddie Hart	3
December 30	She's Got to Be a Saint	Ray Price	3	2

Notes

- 1 No. 1 song of the year, as determined by Billboard.
- 2 Song dropped from No. 1 and later returned to top spot.
- A First Billboard No. 1 hit for that artist.
- B Last Billboard No. 1 hit for that artist.
- C Only Billboard No. 1 hit for that artist to date.

==== Canada ====
(as certified by RPM)

Date	Single Name	Artist	Wks. No.1	U.S. peak	Spec. Note
January 8	Mile After Mile	Orval Prophet	3	—	^{[B]}
January 29	There Ain't No Easy Way	Eddie Chwill	1	—	^{[C]}
February 5	One's on the Way	Loretta Lynn	1
February 12	I Can't See Me Without You	Conway Twitty	1	4
February 19	Bedtime Story	Tammy Wynette	1
February 26	It's Four in the Morning	Faron Young	1		^{[B]}
March 4	Cotton Jenny	Anne Murray	1	11
March 11	Ann (Don't Go Runnin')	Tommy Overstreet	1	2	^{[C]}
March 18	Good Hearted Woman	Waylon Jennings	1	3
March 25	Cry	Lynn Anderson	1	3
April 1	All His Children	Charley Pride	1	2
April 8	My Hang-Up Is You	Freddie Hart	1
April 15	A Thing Called Love	Johnny Cash	1	2
April 22	Smiling Wine	Shirley Eikhard	2	—	^{[C]}
May 6	Moon-Man Newfie	Stompin' Tom Connors	1	—	^{[B]}
May 13	Chantilly Lace	Jerry Lee Lewis	1		^{[B]}
May 20	Nothin' Shakin' (But the Leaves on the Trees)	Billy "Crash" Craddock	1	10	^{[A]}
May 27	Together Again	Hank Smith	1	—
June 3	(Lost Her Love) On Our Last Date	Conway Twitty	2
June 17	Made In Japan	Buck Owens	1		^{[B]}
June 24	Kate	Johnny Cash	1	2
July 1	Sing Happy	Dianne Leigh	1	—	^{[B]}
July 8	That's Why I Love You Like I Do	Sonny James	1
July 15	Eleven Roses	Hank Williams, Jr.	1
July 22	Reach Out Your Hand (And Touch Somebody)	Tammy Wynette	1	2
July 29	It's Gonna Take a Little Bit Longer	Charley Pride	1
August 5	Listen to a Country Song	Lynn Anderson	1	4
August 12	Loving You Could Never Be Better	George Jones	1	2	^{[A]}
August 19	Testing 1-2-3	Joyce Seamone	1	—	^{[C]}
August 26	I'm Gonna Knock on Your Door	Billy "Crash" Craddock	1	5
September 2	There's a Party Goin' On	Jody Miller	1	4	^{[C]}
September 9	Woman (Sensuous Woman)	Don Gibson	1		^{[B]}
September 16	I Can't Stop Loving You	Conway Twitty	2
September 30	When the Snow Is on the Roses	Sonny James	1		^{[B]}
October 7	Oney	Johnny Cash	1	2
October 14	I Ain't Never	Mel Tillis	1		^{[A]}
October 21	Baby, Don't Get Hooked on Me	Mac Davis	1	26	^{[C]}
October 28	Funny Face	Donna Fargo	1		^{[A]}
November 4	My Man (Understands)	Tammy Wynette	1
November 11	It's Not Love (But It's Not Bad)	Merle Haggard	1
November 18	She's Too Good to Be True	Charley Pride	3		^{[2]}: Fell to #2 on the week of December 2.
December 2	Got the All Overs for You (All Over Me)	Freddie Hart	1
December 16	Fool Me	Lynn Anderson	2	4
December 30	You Are What I Am	Gordon Lightfoot	1	—

Notes

- 2 Song dropped from No. 1 and later returned to top spot.
- A First RPM No. 1 hit for that artist.
- B Last RPM No. 1 hit for that artist.
- C Only RPM No. 1 hit for that artist.

=== Other major hits ===
==== Singles released by American artists ====
US	CAN	Single	Artist
15	—	Ain't It All Worth Living For	Tompall & the Glaser Brothers
7	16	Ain't That a Shame	Hank Williams, Jr. and The Mike Curb Congregation
22	12	Alabama Wild Man	Jerry Reed
5	2	All the Lonely Women in the World	Bill Anderson
27	19	Another Puff	Jerry Reed
15	—	Ashes of Love	Dickey Lee
31	15	Baby, Bye Bye	Dickey Lee
12	—	Baby's Smile, Woman's Kiss	Johnny Duncan
26	12	Ballad of a Hillbilly Singer	Freddy Weller
15	11	Be My Baby	Jody Miller
6	6	The Best Part of Living	Marty Robbins
7	9	Borrowed Angel	Mel Street
18	13	Bring Him Safely Home to Me	Sandy Posey
11	9	Burning the Midnight Oil	Porter Wagoner and Dolly Parton
16	13	Cab Driver	Hank Thompson
6	3	The Ceremony	Tammy Wynette and George Jones
63	3	The Child's Song/Country Music in My Soul	George Hamilton IV
6	3	The Class of '57	The Statler Brothers
18	20	The Day That Love Walked In	David Houston
6	3	Delta Dawn	Tanya Tucker
2	—	Do You Remember These	The Statler Brothers
18	28	Don't Pay the Ransom	Nat Stuckey
2	2	Don't She Look Good	Bill Anderson
20	5	Everybody's Reaching Out for Someone	Pat Daisy
12	6	Far Far Away	Don Gibson
19	16	Fools	Johnny Duncan
16	6	Forgive Me for Not Calling You Darling	Nat Stuckey
12	37	Give Myself a Party	Jeannie C. Riley
3	3	Heaven Is My Woman's Love	Tommy Overstreet
3	3	Here I Am Again	Loretta Lynn
19	19	I Really Don't Want to Know	Charlie McCoy
6	3	I Take It on Home	Charlie Rich
17	—	I'll Be There (If You Ever Want Me)	Johnny Bush
8	8	I'll Still Be Waiting for You	Buck Owens
4	4	I'm a Truck	Red Simpson
14	—	I'm Sorry If My Love Got in Your Way	Connie Smith
11	19	I've Come Awful Close	Hank Thompson
4	13	I've Found Someone of My Own	Cal Smith
3	—	(I've Got A) Happy Heart	Susan Raye
13	24	I've Got to Have You	Sammi Smith
7	15	If It Ain't Love (Let's Leave It Alone)	Connie Smith
14	26	If It Feels Good Do It	Dave Dudley
9	15	If You Touch Me (You've Got to Love Me)	Joe Stampley
11	3	Is This the Best I'm Gonna Feel	Don Gibson
5	4	Just for What I Am	Connie Smith
16	6	Katy Did	Porter Wagoner
15	26	The Key's in the Mailbox	Tony Booth
9	4	The Lawrence Welk – Hee Haw Counter-Revolution Polka	Roy Clark
13	18	Let's All Go Down to the River	Jody Miller and Johnny Paycheck
11	13	Lonely Weekends	Jerry Lee Lewis
4	4	Lonely Women Make Good Lovers	Bob Luman
16	7	Lonesome 7-7203	Tony Booth
2	2	The Lonesomest Lonesome	Ray Price
13	—	Looking Back to See	Buck Owens and Susan Raye
9	—	Lost Forever in Your Kiss	Porter Wagoner and Dolly Parton
12	24	Love Is a Good Thing	Johnny Paycheck
36	14	Love Is Like a Spinning Wheel	Jan Howard
6	6	Manhattan, Kansas	Glen Campbell
8	4	Me and Jesus	Tom T. Hall
8	13	Missing You	Jim Reeves
37	10	Misty Memories	Brenda Lee
11	9	The Monkey That Became President	Tom T. Hall
26	14	More About John Henry	Tom T. Hall
15	15	Much Oblige	Jack Greene and Jeannie Seely
10	—	My Heart Has a Mind of Its Own	Susan Raye
9	9	Need You	David Rogers
15	9	Oklahoma Sunday Morning	Glen Campbell
54	4	One Tin Soldier	Skeeter Davis
2	2	Only Love Can Break a Heart	Sonny James
5	13	A Picture of Me (Without You)	George Jones
6	2	Pretend I Never Happened	Waylon Jennings
3	2	Pride's Not Hard to Swallow	Hank Williams, Jr.
17	16	Red Red Wine	Roy Drusky
34	18	Rhythm of the Rain	Pat Roberts
17	29	The Roadmaster	Freddy Weller
21	16	Ruby, You're Warm	David Rogers
46	6	Sad Situation	Skeeter Davis
24	13	Sea of Heartbreak	Kenny Price
16	12	A Seed Before the Rose	Tommy Overstreet
14	31	Send Me Some Lovin'	Hank Williams, Jr. and Lois Johnson
11	48	Show Me	Barbara Mandrell
3	63	Sing Me a Love Song to Baby	Billy Walker
8	6	Soft, Sweet and Warm	David Houston
21	13	Somebody Loves Me	Johnny Paycheck
4	7	Someone to Give My Love To	Johnny Paycheck
15	31	Somewhere in Virginia in the Rain	Jack Blanchard & Misty Morgan
7	3	Sweet Dream Woman	Waylon Jennings
12	17	Sylvia's Mother	Bobby Bare
9	12	Take Me	Tammy Wynette and George Jones
33	3	Ten Degrees and Getting Colder	George Hamilton IV
5	3	This Little Girl of Mine	Faron Young
11	12	This Much a Man	Marty Robbins
12	8	To Get to You	Jerry Wallace
18	12	To Know Him Is to Love Him	Jody Miller
16	13	Today I Started Loving You Again	Charlie McCoy
14	—	Together Always	Porter Wagoner and Dolly Parton
10	34	Tonight My Baby's Coming Home	Barbara Mandrell
6	28	Touch Your Woman	Dolly Parton
52	20	Travelin' Light	George Hamilton IV
17	10	Turn Your Radio On	Ray Stevens
14	17	Untouched	Mel Tillis
20	7	Washday Blues	Dolly Parton
6	4	We Can Make It	George Jones
8	10	What Ain't to Be Just Might Happen	Porter Wagoner
13	24	What Am I Gonna Do	Bobby Bare
19	19	What in the World Has Gone Wrong with Our Love	Jack Greene and Jeannie Seely
16	11	Wheel of Fortune	Susan Raye
6	10	When You Say Love	Bob Luman
14	7	Whiskey River	Johnny Bush
5	2	White Silver Sands	Sonny James
14	6	Who's Gonna Play This Ol' Piano?	Jerry Lee Lewis
18	—	A Whole Lot of Somethin'	Tony Booth
14	5	A World Without Music	Porter Wagoner
12	24	Would You Want the World to End	Mel Tillis
15	20	The Writing's on the Wall	Jim Reeves
12	14	You've Gotta Cry Girl	Dave Dudley

==== Singles released by Canadian artists ====
US	CAN	Single	Artist
—	15	Albert County Soul	Marg Osburne
—	4	Bill Jones General Store	Tommy Hunter
—	9	The Bug Song	Stompin' Tom Connors
—	16	Cold Day in October	R. Harlan Smith
—	9	Come on Back	Billy Stolyz
—	12	Country Soul	Honey West
—	8	Ding-a-Ling Debbie	R. Harlan Smith
—	18	Donna on My Mind	Hugh Scott
—	6	Down and Losing	Bob Ruzicka
—	3	Family Love	Family Brown
—	12	Here's to Lovin' You	Jack Bailey
—	9	Home Again This Year	Dick Nolan
—	6	I'd Like to See You	Humphrey and the Dumptrucks
—	5	I'm Coming Home	Jim and Don Haggart
—	8	In the Loving Arms	Dallas Harms
62	19	It Rains Just the Same in Missouri	Ray Griff
—	8	It's Good to Be Home Again	Orval Prophet
—	3	Kentucky Turn Your Back	Mercey Brothers
—	16	Lonesome River	Gene MacLellan
—	4	The Long Green Line	Dick Damron
—	18	Long Lonely Road	Dianne Leigh
—	20	Louisiana Joe	B. J. Berg
—	26	November Rain	Wayne Rostad
—	14	Papa Was a Fiddlin' Man	Michael Brandon
—	19	The Redman and the Train	Harry Rusk
—	17	Robbie's Song for Jesus	Anne Murray
—	8	Robbin' the Cradle	Con Archer
—	3	Saunder's Ferry Line	Gary Buck
—	6	The Seashores of Old Mexico	Hank Snow
—	8	Sit Down Mr. Music Man	Little John Cameron
—	11	Something in Your Face	Shirley Eikhard
—	4	Somewhere There's a Mountain	Eddie Chwill
—	2	Storm Warning	Bob Ruzicka
—	19	Sweet City Woman	Jeffy Young
—	19	Take Me Home	Hank Smith
—	16	That's How My Heart Beats for You	Carroll Baker
—	9	Total Destruction	Lynn Jones
—	17	Travellin' On	Lynn Jones
—	20	Trouble's Back in Town	Hugh Scott
—	12	Tryin'	The Poppy Family
—	19	When Final Change Is Made	Gary Buck
—	15	Whistler's Mountain	Andy Zachary
—	15	You Don't Have to Go to Switzerland	Russ Gurr
—	18	You're Just More a Woman	Danny Coughlan

== Top new album releases ==
Album	Artist	Record Label
America: A 200-Year Salute in Story and Song	Johnny Cash	Columbia
Bill and Jan (Or Jan and Bill)	Bill Anderson and Jan Howard	Decca
Don't She Look Good	Bill Anderson	Decca
Eagles	The Eagles	Asylum
Good Hearted Woman	Waylon Jennings	RCA
The Happiest Girl in the Whole U.S.A.	Donna Fargo	Dot
International Superstar	Johnny Cash	RCA
Ladies Love Outlaws	Waylon Jennings	RCA
Lynn Anderson's Greatest Hits	Lynn Anderson	Columbia
My Favorite Songwriter: Porter Wagoner	Dolly Parton	RCA
The Right Combination/Burning The Midnight Oil	Porter Wagoner and Dolly Parton	RCA
A Sweeter Love	Barbara Fairchild	Columbia
A Thing Called Love	Johnny Cash	Columbia
Together Always	Porter Wagoner and Dolly Parton	RCA
Touch Your Woman	Dolly Parton	RCA
Will the Circle Be Unbroken	Nitty Gritty Dirt Band	EMI America

=== Other top albums ===
Album	Artist	Record Label
Bill Anderson Sings for "All the Lonely Women in the World"	Bill Anderson	Decca
Cry	Lynn Anderson	Columbia
Garden Party	Ricky Nelson	MCA
The Hillbilly Singer	Skeeter Davis	RCA
If It Ain't Love and Other Great Dallas Frazier Songs	Connie Smith	RCA
Lonely Women Make Good Lovers	Bob Luman	Epic
Love Is Like a Spinning Wheel	Jan Howard	Decca
There's a Party Goin' On	Jody Miller	Epic
Two for the Show	Jack Greene and Jeannie Seely	Decca
Wheel of Fortune	Susan Raye	Capitol

=== Christmas albums ===
- The Johnny Cash Family Christmas — Johnny Cash (Columbia)

== Births ==
- February 23 — Steve Holy, 2000s (decade) country singer best known for his No. 1 hit "Good Morning Beautiful."
- April 5 — Pat Green, "Texas country"-styled singer/songwriter.
- July 17 — Paul Brandt, Canadian country singer who began enjoying U.S. success in the late 1990s.
- August 16 — Emily Robison, member of the Dixie Chicks (she plays the guitar, banjo and dobro).
- October 23 — Jimmy Wayne, singer-songwriter of the 2000s (decade).
- October 28 — Brad Paisley, new traditionalist of the 2000s (decade).

== Deaths ==
- January 28 — T. Texas Tyler, 55, 1940s country star best known for "The Deck of Cards."
- June 23 — Elton Britt, 59, 1940s country star best known for "There's a Star-Spangled Banner Waving Somewhere."
- July 16 – Charlie Chamberlain, 61, Canadian Country Singer, who was the Male vocalist for Don Messer's Islanders from the band's inception in 1933 until shortly before his death (Heart Attack).

== Country Music Hall of Fame Inductees ==
- Jimmie Davis (1899–2000)

== Major awards ==
=== Grammy Awards ===
- Best Female Country Vocal Performance — "The Happiest Girl in the Whole USA", Donna Fargo
- Best Male Country Vocal Performance — Charley Pride Sings Heart Songs, Charley Pride
- Best Country Performance by a Duo or Group with Vocal — "Class of '57", The Statler Brothers
- Best Country Instrumental Performance — Charlie McCoy/The Real McCoy, Charlie McCoy
- Best Country Song — "Kiss an Angel Good Morning", Ben Peters (Performer: Charley Pride)

=== Juno Awards ===
- Country Male Vocalist of the Year — Stompin' Tom Connors
- Country Female Vocalist of the Year — Myrna Lorrie
- Country Group or Duo of the Year — Mercey Brothers

=== Academy of Country Music ===
- Entertainer of the Year — Roy Clark
- Song of the Year — "The Happiest Girl in the Whole USA", Donna Fargo (Performer: Donna Fargo)
- Single of the Year — "The Happiest Girl in the Whole USA", Donna Fargo
- Album of the Year — The Happiest Girl in the Whole USA, Donna Fargo
- Top Male Vocalist — Merle Haggard
- Top Female Vocalist — Donna Fargo
- Top Vocal Group — The Statler Brothers
- Top New Male Vocalist — Johnny Rodriguez
- Top New Female Vocalist — Tanya Tucker

=== Country Music Association ===
- Entertainer of the Year — Loretta Lynn
- Song of the Year — "Easy Loving", Freddie Hart (Performer: Freddie Hart)
- Single of the Year — "The Happiest Girl in the Whole USA", Donna Fargo
- Album of the Year — Let Me Tell You About a Song, Merle Haggard
- Male Vocalist of the Year — Charley Pride
- Female Vocalist of the Year — Loretta Lynn
- Vocal Duo of the Year — Conway Twitty and Loretta Lynn
- Vocal Group of the Year — The Statler Brothers
- Instrumentalist of the Year — Charlie McCoy
- Instrumental Group of the Year — Danny Davis and the Nashville Brass

== Other links ==
- Country Music Association
- Inductees of the Country Music Hall of Fame
