= Gerry Joly =

Canadian singer

- Birth name: Gérald Joly
- Born: 1934; Hawkesbury, Ontario, Canada
- Died: 29 December 2008 (aged 74); Gatineau, Quebec, Canada
- Genres: Country
- Occupation(s): Musician; Singer; Songwriter
- Instrument(s): Vocals, guitar
- Years active: 1950s–2000s

Gérald Joly (1934, in Hawkesbury, Ontario – 29 December 2008, in Gatineau, Quebec) was a Franco-Ontarian country music singer-songwriter. Joly's career began in the late 1950s, giving small concerts in both English and French throughout Ontario. In 1969 he wrote and composed "Mile After Mile", a song which featured on his first LP Gerry Joly Duo - Live at the Belle Claire (1970). The song is best known through Orval Prophet's 1971 cover which topped the Canadian RPM country charts. Joly also wrote a French version of the song and sang one chorus in French on the aforementioned LP but the French version was made famous by Willie Lamothe. It has become a standard for French-speaking Canadian country musicians and has been recorded by well-known figures of this genre including Patrick Norman, Renée Martel and Paul Brunelle. The song has also been performed by Celine Dion. Joly wrote and sang for more than 50 years and is also remembered for his comedy songs.

Joly died on December 29, 2008, of pulmonary fibrosis at the age of 74.
