= Vic Mullen =

Canadian multi-instrumentalist

Melvin Victor (Vic) Mullen (born January 28, 1933) is a multi-instrumentalist, television host, and teacher born in Woodstock, Nova Scotia. He is one of the earliest Canadian Bluegrass performers, has appeared numerous times on CBC programming, and has toured across Canada.

Mullen was music director on radio and television programs in addition to his work as A&R representative for Rodeo Records for a period of time in the 1960s.

== Early career ==
Mullen originated from a musical family and learned how to play the 5-string banjo, fiddle, guitar and mandolin at an early age. His professional career began at the age of 16 while touring with fiddler Ned Landry. Later, in the 1950s Mullen gained experience working with Charley Bailey, Ken MacKenzie, Kidd Baker, The Rainbow Valley Boys and The Country Valley Boys until forming The Birch Mountain Boys in 1959 with Brent Williams on fiddle, Harry Cromwell on mandolin and lead guitar and himself on the 5-string banjo. The Birch Mountain Boys also toured and released recordings with fellow Nova Scotian, Angus Walker during the early 1960s. Mullen became an A&R representative for Rodeo Records during the mid 1960s and additionally, Mullen also hosted "Vic Mullen's Country Time Jamboree and Talent Show" for CHNS radio. During this time, he released recordings under his own name, such as "Mr. Country Strings" in 1964 and "Swingin' Fiddle" & "Vic Mullen's Country Time Jamboree" in 1966. Mullen also played various instruments on numerous entertainers' songs such as Fred Mckenna and the Boutilier Brothers, in addition to production roles for Rodeo Records during this period.

== Appearances on radio and television ==
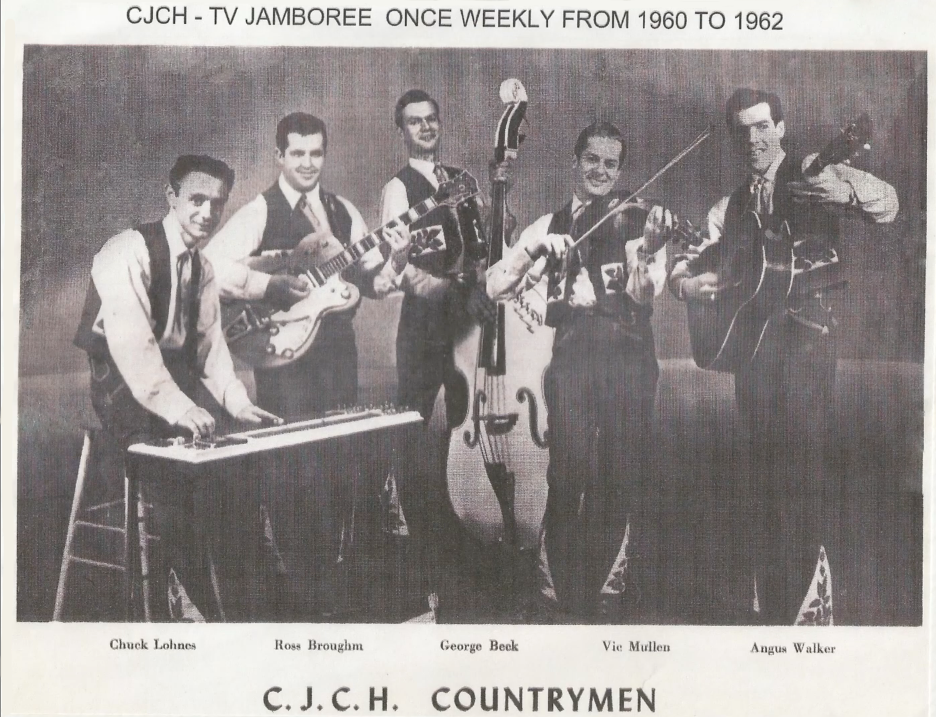
CJCH Countrymen

Mullen made a substantial number of appearances on notable television programming in Canada in different roles throughout the 1960s and 1970s. In Halifax, he headed the house band "The Countrymen" on CJCH/TV with Walker, Ross Broughm, Chuck Lohnes and George Beck. Mullen "was seen nationally" on CTV's "Cross Canada Barndance" with the Bluenose Boys during the networks inaugural season in 1961-62. He joined "Don Messer's Jubilee" on CBC television in 1962 and made regular appearances as banjo player performing with the likes of Myrna Lorrie and others until the show's cancellation in 1969. Starting in 1970, he was music director and band leader of "The Hickorys" consisting on Ron Naugle, Ken Meisner and Stan Taylor on CBC's Countrytime filmed in Dartmouth, NS. He also worked closely with Myrna Lorrie on the program in addition to an album titled "It's Countrytime" for MCA Records. Mullen, The Hickorys and Lorrie also toured with Family Brown in Ontario in 1971 and made other appearances with them afterwards. Later, he accepted a role as co-host of Country Roads on CBC Radio and television from 1974 to 1980.

== Later career and legacy ==
Mullen resumed touring, now accompanied by his band "Meadowgreen" in 1980 and subsequently toured Canada over 20 times over the next eleven years including playing fiddle for Mac Wiseman. He also started his own record label "Jay-Vee" in the late 1980s. Mullen taught music during this period and continued his appearances at festivals during the summer. He retired in 1997 but continued to "teach music and occasionally perform." Part of his legacy includes helping to start the careers of many local entertainers "on his weekly stage shows." In 2001, Mullen was inducted into The Nova Scotia Hall of Fame.
