= Tommy Overstreet discography =

- Studio albums: 17
- Live albums: 1
- Compilation albums: 3
- Singles: 40

Tommy Overstreet was an American country music artist. His discography consists of 17 studio albums, three compilation albums, one live albums, and 40 singles. 34 of his singles charted on the Billboard Hot Country Songs chart between 1969 and 1986.

== Albums ==
=== Studio albums ===
Title	Details	Peak positions
Title	Details	US Country
Gwen (Congratulations)	Release year: 1971; Label: Dot	33
This Is Tommy Overstreet	Release year: 1972; Label: Dot	22
Heaven Is My Woman's Love	Release year: 1972; Label: Dot	9
My Friends Call Me T.O.	Release year: 1973; Label: Dot	23
Woman, Your Name Is My Song	Release year: 1974; Label: Dot	41
I'm a Believer	Release year: 1975; Label: ABC / Dot	38
Turn On to Tommy Overstreet	Release year: 1976; Label: ABC / Dot	46
Vintage '77	Release year: 1977; Label: ABC / Dot	26
Hangin' 'Round	Release year: 1977; Label: ABC / Dot	44
Better Me (Tenth Anniversary Album)	Release year: 1978; Label: ABC / Dot	—
There'll Never Be Another First Time (with The Nashville Express)	Release year: 1978; Label: Tina	—
I'll Never Let You Down	Release year: 1978; Label: Elektra	—
The Real Tommy Overstreet	Release year: 1980; Label: Elektra	—
The Best Of	Release year: 1982; Label: Elektra	—
Dream Maker	Release year: 1982; Label: Intercord	—
Good Lovin' Feelin'	Release year: 1983; Label: Intercord	—
Country Gospel Favorites	Release date: March 28, 2006; Label: Madacy Christian	—
"—" denotes releases that did not chart

=== Compilation albums ===
Title	Details	Peak positions
Title	Details	US Country
Greatest Hits Vol. One	Release year: 1975; Label: ABC / Dot	18
The Best of Tommy Overstreet	Release date: September 22, 1998; Label: Varèse Sarabande	—
20 Classic Songs of Tommy Overstreet	Release date: August 26, 2008; Label: Varèse Sarabande	—
"—" denotes releases that did not chart

=== Live albums ===
Title	Details	Peak positions
Title	Details	US Country
The Tommy Overstreet Show Live from the Silver Slipper	Release year: 1975; Label: ABC / Dot	36

== Singles ==
Year	Single	Peak positions			Album
Year	Single	US Country	US Bubb.	CAN Country	Album
1965	"Little Bit of Devil"	—	—	—	Non-album singles
1968	"Every Day I Fall More in Love with You"	—	—	—	Non-album singles
1968	"Watching the Trains Go By"	—	—	—	Non-album singles
1969	"Games People Play"	—	—	—	Non-album singles
1969	"Rocking a Memory (That Won't Go to Sleep)"	73	—	—	Non-album singles
1969	"Painted by the Wine"	—	—	—	Non-album singles
1970	"Good Day Sunshine" (with Peggy Little)	—	—	—	Non-album singles
1970	"If You're Looking for a Fool"	56	—	—	Gwen (Congratulations)
1971	"Gwen (Congratulations)"	5	23	2	Gwen (Congratulations)
1971	"I Don't Know You (Anymore)"	5	—	3	Gwen (Congratulations)
1972	"Ann (Don't Go Runnin')"	2	—	1	This Is Tommy Overstreet
1972	"A Seed Before the Rose"	16	—	12	Heaven Is My Woman's Love
1972	"Heaven Is My Woman's Love"	3	2	3	Heaven Is My Woman's Love
1973	"Send Me No Roses"	7	—	10	My Friends Call Me T.O.
1973	"I'll Never Break These Chains"	7	—	10	My Friends Call Me T.O.
1974	"(Jeannie Marie) You Were a Lady"	3	—	3	Woman, Your Name Is My Song
1974	"If I Miss You Again Tonight"	8	—	2	I'm a Believer
1974	"I'm a Believer"	9	—	9	I'm a Believer
1975	"That's When My Woman Begins"	6	—	4	The Tommy Overstreet Show; Live from the Silver Slipper
1975	"From Woman to Woman"	16	—	8	Non-album single
1976	"Here Comes That Girl Again"	15	—	23	Turn On to Tommy Overstreet
1976	"Young Girl"	29	—	37	Turn On to Tommy Overstreet
1976	"If Love Was a Bottle of Wine"	11	—	12	Vintage '77
1977	"Don't Go City Girl On Me"	5	—	5	Vintage '77
1977	"This Time I'm in It for the Love"	20	—	—	Hangin' 'Round
1978	"Yes Ma'am"	12	—	15	Hangin' 'Round
1978	"Better Me"	20	—	34	Better Me (Tenth Anniversary Album)
1978	"Fadin' In, Fadin' Out"	11	—	18	Better Me (Tenth Anniversary Album)
1979	"Tears (There's Nowhere Else to Hide)" (with The Nashville Express)	91	—	—	There'll Never Be Another First Time
1979	"Cheater's Kit"	45	—	32	Better Me (Tenth Anniversary Album)
1979	"I'll Never Let You Down"	27	—	—	I'll Never Let You Down
1979	"What More Could a Man Need"	23	—	—	The Real Tommy Overstreet
1979	"Fadin' Renegade"	36	—	—	The Real Tommy Overstreet
1980	"Down in the Quarter"	41	—	—	The Real Tommy Overstreet
1980	"Sue"	47	—	—	The Best Of
1980	"Me and the Boys in the Band"	72	—	—	The Best Of
1983	"Dream Maker"	69	—	—	Dream Maker
1983	"Heart of Dixie"	84	—	—	Dream Maker
1984	"I Still Love Your Body"	87	—	—	Non-album singles
1986	"Next to You"	74	—	—	Non-album singles
"—" denotes releases that did not chart
