= Levi Brenton Williams =

Canadian gospel, country entertainer

Brent Williams
- Born: March 25, 1940 (age 86); Hassett, Nova Scotia, Canada
- Genres: Gospel, Country, Bluegrass
- Occupation: Musician

Levi Brenton (Brent) Williams (born March 25, 1940), is a multi-instrumental Canadian gospel, country and bluegrass entertainer from Hassett, Nova Scotia. Williams is considered one of Canada's earliest bluegrass performers, has appeared on several notable TV programs on the CBC, CTV, and many other networks in addition to winning many awards for his music and for his achievements and role as a pioneering Canadian entertainer. He has released a number of top 100 charting songs in addition to working with several notable entertainers such as The Carter Family, Ronnie Prophet, Vic Mullen, Fred McKenna, Shania Twain, Charlie Louvin, Marcel Martel, Angus Walker, The Mercey Brothers, Myrna Lorrie, Stompin' Tom Connors, Osborne Bros, Wilburn Bros, Jean Sheppard, Dallas Harms, Oakridge Boys, among others.

== Early life ==
Brent Williams was born on a small farm in Hassetts, Nova Scotia, to Ethel Ena May Williams on March 25, 1940. He was the youngest of eight children and was "Influenced by his mother's love of music and encouraged by his brother to begin playing guitar" early in life. His interest in being a career performer began by listening to numerous acts featured on The Grand Ole Opry when he was seven or eight years old. Williams acquired his first guitar at the age of six when his mother ordered him one from a Sears catalog for $9.95 and his brother Robert first started to show him how to play. Williams would also begin a lifelong friendship with his neighbour and future bandmate, Harry Cromwell, during these early years.

== Early Music Career ==
When Williams was a teenager, he began his musical career when he started playing at local parties dances and competitions with Harry Cromwell. In 1957, Williams relocated to his older sister's residence in Halifax to work a construction job. In the fall of that year, Williams received a call from Cromwell who informed him that professional musician Vic Mullen had heard of the duo's performances and was interested in forming a bluegrass band with them which was a relatively new genre in Canada at that point. Williams moved back to Hassetts and the three began a band called The Birch Mountain Boys upon his return. Between the fall of 1957 and the spring of 1958, Mullen taught Williams and Cromwell how to play the fiddle and mandolin in the bluegrass style, respectively. During the spring 1961, the Birch Mountain Boys began to tour and play at various small venues across the Maritime provinces with Williams on fiddle, vocals and rhythm guitar, Cromwell on lead guitar and mandolin and Vic Mullen playing the 5-string banjo. Over the course of their time together, The Birch Mountain Boys became "...one of the first to play and record bluegrass music north of the border..." The Birch Mountain Boys incorporated various other musicians as bassists during this time and the musician that worked with The Birch Mountain Boys the most was Angus Walker who eventually became a permanent member of the group.

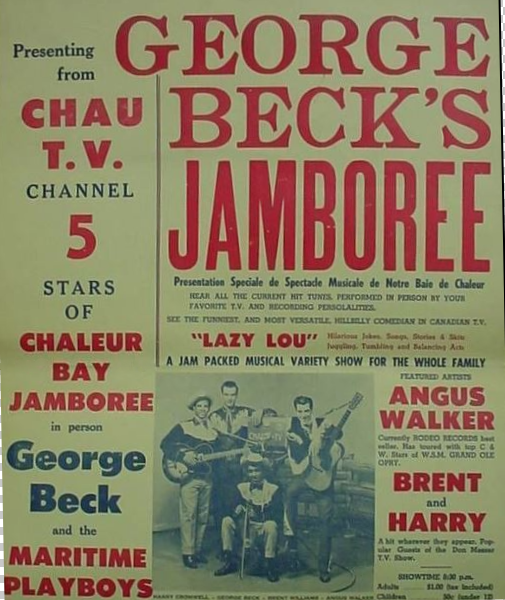
The Maritime Playboys

After The Birch Mountain Boys disbanded in 1961, Williams and Cromwell toured as "The Brent & Harry Show", utilizing various "pick-up bands" from locations they performed at in the Maritimes. Later, the duo were given an opportunity to appear on the popular CBC program Don Messer's Jubilee where they were joined once again by Vic Mullen for the performance. They also appeared on a program led by Vic Mullen during this period called CJCH Jamboree. It was also during this time that the duo recorded their first record as featured performers titled "Country Special with Brent & Harry" with Mullen and Walker providing fiddle and bass, respectively. In 1962, the duo joined "The Beck Family", led by George Beck who held contests in New Germany and in other towns in Nova Scotia until Beck, Williams and Cromwell started another band called "George Beck and The Maritime Playboys". The group worked with Hall of Fame musician, Ross Broughm who appeared as a lead guitarist during the period. Later, Beck negotiated an arrangement where the group toured northern New Brunswick and the Gaspé region of Quebec while also appearing on the program the CHAU-TV Jamboree originating out of Carleton, Quebec. Angus Walker joined The Maritime Playboys shortly thereafter. In 1963, Williams and Cromwell transitioned to Drummondville, Quebec after receiving an offer to join notable French Canadian performer Marcel Martell's band and TV show on CHLT-TV in Sherbrooke, Quebec and also performed regularly in Montreal during this time.

== Solo career ==
Williams began his solo career in 1965 when he transitioned to Toronto, Ontario playing at several venues in the nightclub scene there, such as The Matador until 1969. Starting in 1970, Williams recorded and released several albums for Marathon Records until moving to Boot Records where he recorded two singles that charted on RPM Magazine's weekly ranking. "Back Home in Georgia" reached number 25 in 1972 and "Til' I Can't Take it Anymore" which reached number 37 in 1973. Also that year, Williams became a founding member of The Canadian Country Music Association. In 1975, Williams won The Bon Soo fiddle competition in Sault Ste. Marie. In 1978, "I Wish You Were With Me Tonight" was released Grand Slam Record Label and peaked at number 47. Also In both 1976 and 1977, Williams received certificates of merit from The Canadian Academy of Recording Arts and Sciences. Williams was nominated for the CCMA Award in the Outstanding Artist Award category in 1978. During the 1980s, Williams released a number of recordings on the J-Bash record label and performed at Walmart stores across Canada during the 90's. Starting in the early 2000s, Williams focussed mostly on recording and performing gospel music. In 2013, Williams was inducted into The Nova Scotia Country Music Hall of Fame for his accomplishments in the music industry. Williams returned to CBC programming in 2015 when he was the featured musician in Studio Black!, a show that tells African Canadian stories and received a lifetime achievement award from the African Nova Scotian Music Association around this time.

== Honors and awards ==
- Canadian Country Music Association Awards:

Year	Nominated work / Recipient	Category	Result
1978	Brent Williams	Outstanding Artist	Nominated

- Inductee of the Nova Scotia Country Music Hall of Fame. (2013)
- African Nova Scotian Music Association's Lifetime Achievement Award. (2015)
