= Countrytime =

Countrytime may refer to:

- Countrytime (1960s TV series), a 1960-66 Canadian agricultural information television series
- Countrytime (1970s TV series), a 1970-74 Canadian country music television series
- Country Time, a commercial brand of beverage
- "CountryTime", song by Blanco Brown from Honeysuckle & Lightning Bugs
