= Angus Walker =

Canadian bluegrass and country musician (1939–2024)

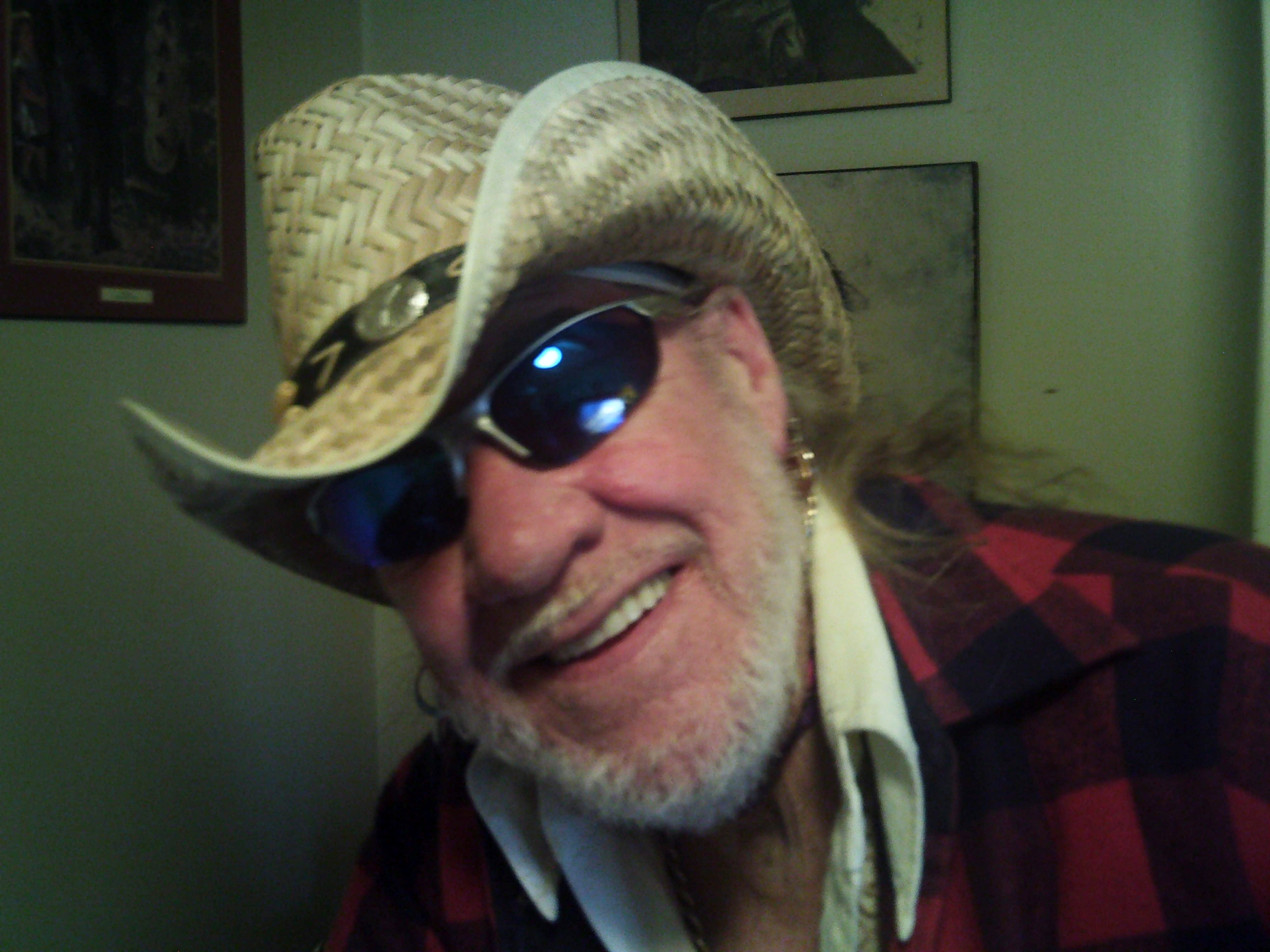
Walker in 2015

Angus Reynolds Walker (August 27, 1939 – November 6, 2024) was a Canadian bluegrass and country entertainer from Port Hastings, Cape Breton, Nova Scotia. He has been called "Canada's Prime Minister of Country Music" and "The Cape Breton Rebel".

Walker has appeared as a vocalist, upright bass and rhythm guitar player with various groups and artists. He has been featured on several albums and singles for various labels including Boot and Rodeo Records in addition to making numerous radio and television appearances such as CBC's Countrytime. He has worked with Fred McKenna, Vic Mullen, Don Messer, Mac Wiseman, Charley Bailey, Doc Williams, and Ben Kerr, Marg Osborne and Brent Williams, among others.

== Music career ==
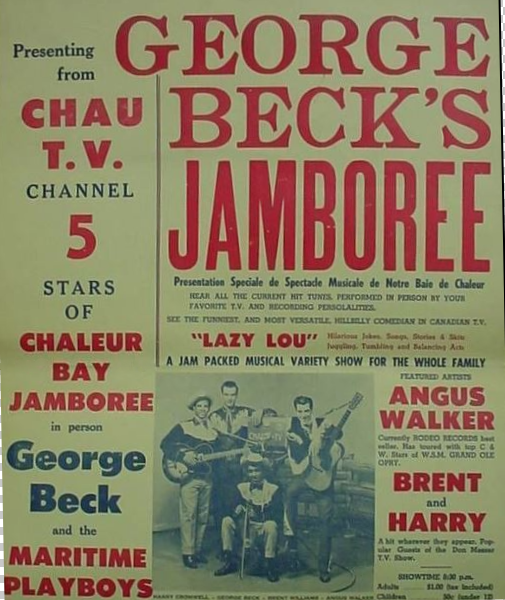
Promotional image

Walker's music career began at the age of 12, performing at local venues until 1953, when he began to appear with Ron Spencer, Cris Chisholm and Earl Chisholm as part of the Radio Rangers on CJFX Radio. After 1956, he appeared as part of the West Virginia Jamboree Show with Charley Bailey and later toured with future Canadian Country Music Hall of Fame alumni Fred McKenna and George Beck as a member of Beck's "Maritime Playboys". Walker also participated and won the "CBC Talent Caravan", which was held at Saint Francis Xavier University and adjudicated by Glenn Sarty. Around the same time, Walker played the upright bass, rhythm guitar and sang in various roles with The Birch Mountain Boys who consisted of Vic Mullen usually playing banjo, Brent Williams playing fiddle and providing vocals, guitar and harmony and Harry Cromwell on mandolin, lead guitar and singing harmony. Eventually, he became a full-fledged member of the group. Walker and the group became one of the earliest performers of Canadian Bluegrass music in the early 1960s. The group performed at small venues in places such as Ingonish, Neil's Harbour, Baddeck, Waycobah, Port Hawkesbury, Goldboro, and Cheticamp, among others.

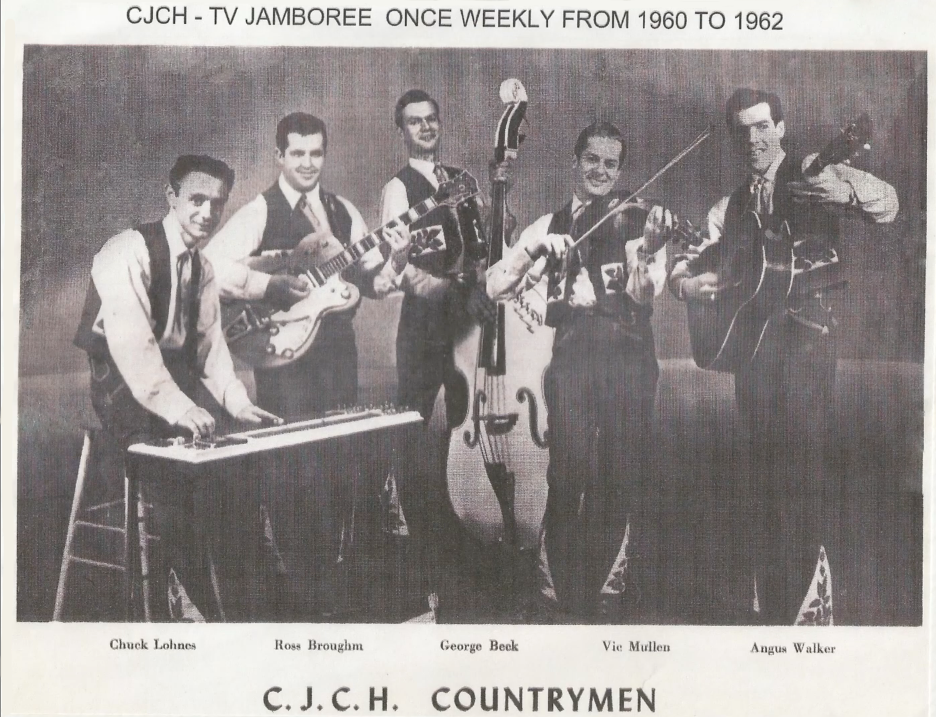
The CJCH Countrymen

After The Birch Mountain Boys disbanded in 1961, Walker became part of The CJCH Countrymen. The group was assembled via audition by CJCH for their program which was "...the first cross-country television show of country music ever to originate in Halifax" titled "The CJCH Countrymen Jamboree". The CJCH Countrymen consisted of Walker (lead vocal and rhythm guitar), Beck (bass), Mullen (fiddle and banjo), Chuck Lohnes (steel guitar) and Ross Broughm (lead guitar). During this time, The Countrymen were the house band for the aforementioned TV show while also performing on the road with notable performers such as Mac Wiseman, Marg Osborne and Tommy Common. Later, Beck then Walker reunited with Williams and Cromwell, who had already relocated to the Gaspe area as part of Beck's latest iteration of "The Maritime Playboys" who performed on weekly TV show for CHAU in Carleton, Quebec.

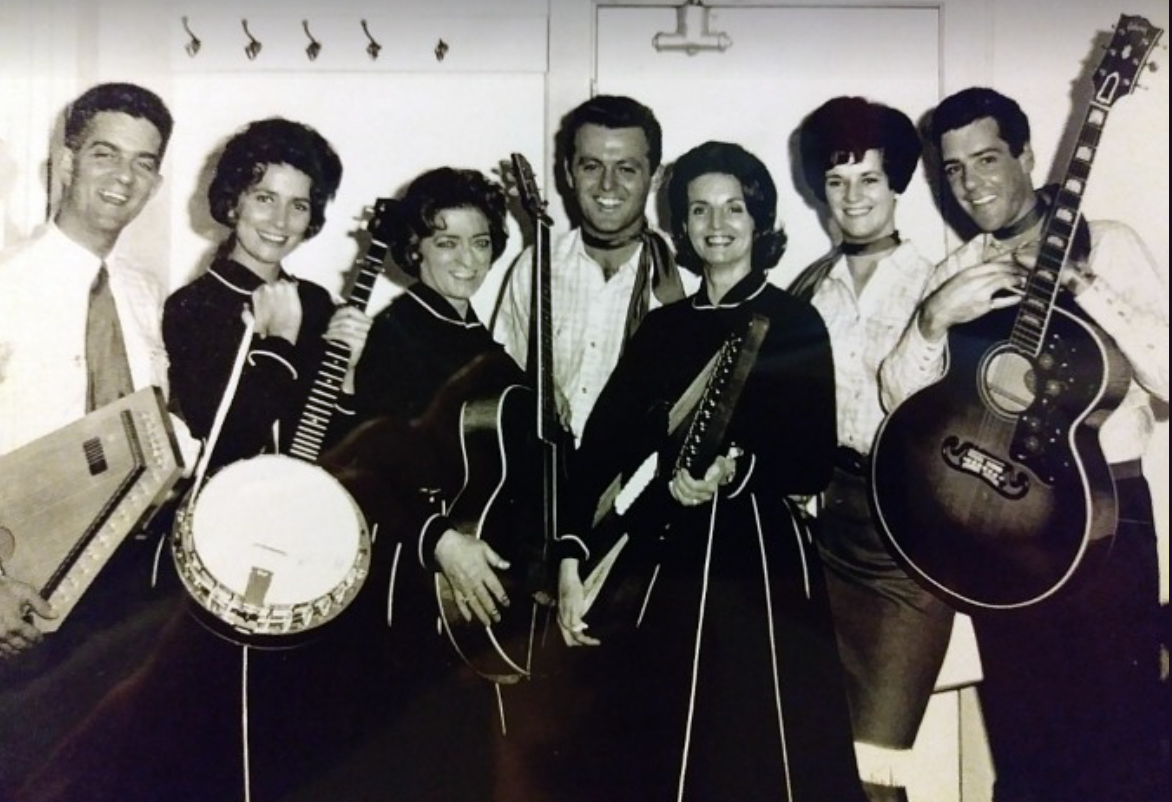
The Hackamores and Carters

In 1963, Walker transitioned to Montreal where he eventually joined Dougal Trineer's band "The Hackamores" mostly appearing as a rhythm guitarist and harmony singer, along with Paul Menard on fiddle, June Davey supplying bass and vocals and Trineer as lead guitarist and singer. As part of big package shows organized by the CFOX radio station in Montreal, The Hackamores opened for both Buck Owens and The Carter Family at the Montreal Forum in 1964. The Hackamores also backed "...many of the country records out of Montreal" at the time, in addition to playing at several venues in the Montreal and Toronto areas such as the Blue Angel, The Wagon Wheel and The Monteray Club where The Hackamores were considered the main attraction for a time.

Four of Walker's singles charted above the top 50 in RPM Magazine's weekly ranking of Country music songs between 1965 and 1971. Cadillacin' Around, written by Will Odo and recorded with The Hackamores, plateaued at No. 2 and gained him "national popularity" before winning the RPM Gold Leaf Award (later known as the Juno Awards) for "Most Promising Male Country Singer" in 1965. Due to these successes, by 1966 he was receiving "much recognition as an up and coming country singer". In 1968, Walker did some guesting work with Doc Williams and The Border Riders. Peaking at No. 35 in 1970 was Crazy Tricks, written by Merv Smith and produced by Dick Damron and recorded in Edmonton. During this time in Alberta, Walker continued to have popularity in Quebec and the Atlantic provinces. In 1971, two of Walker's recordings reached the top 50 starting with the self-penned Canadian Country Music Man which featured Marie Babin (vocals) and "first call" studio lead guitarist Mickey McGivern, reaching as high as No. 22. Later that year, Parliament Hill, written by Ben Kerr and produced by Trineer, peaked at No. 18 on RPM Weekly's Country song listing.

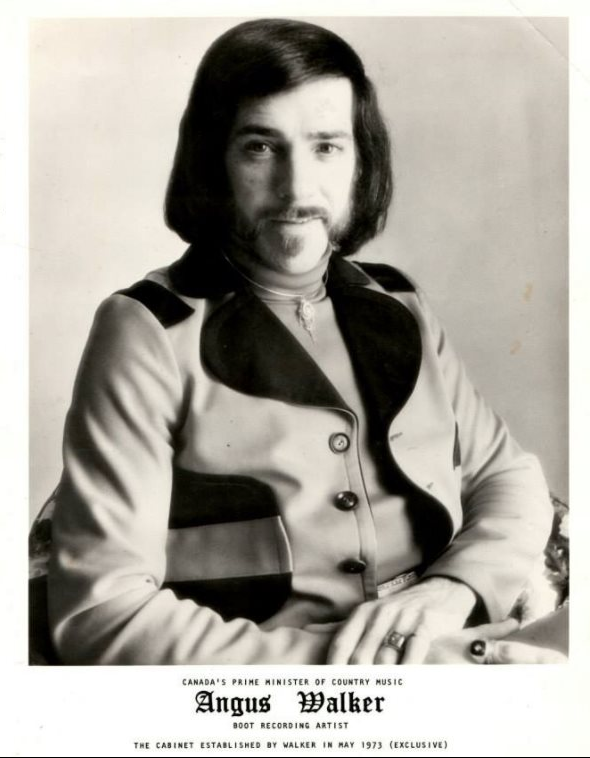
Boot Records promotional image of Walker

In the fall and winter of 1970 and 1971, now known as Canada's Prime Minister of Country Music, Walker made appearances on CBC's Countrytime and on May 12, 1971, Walker joined folk performer and television personality Don Messer on a tour across Canada. Additionally, Walker performed Parliament Hill on an episode of The Don Messer Show that aired on January 29, 1972, on CJAY-TV. Walker also spent time playing at The Dunes nightclub in Hawaii, starting in 1972 along with Bobby Munro on piano and Doug Lewis on bass. Upon returning to Canada, Walker assembled his own exclusive band known as "The Cabinet" featuring lead guitarist Steve Lau whom he had met during his time in Hawaii and brothers, Larry and Henry Brennan, on drums and bass, respectively. In 1975, Walker received "heavy east coast airplay for his Diesel Drivin' Man single", recorded with The Cabinet and also made an appearance on The Ian Tyson Show backing Jim and Don Haggart.

Walker began an indefinite hiatus from his music career due to medical issues in 1977 although he did occasionally record songs and perform after 1989 as "The Cape Breton Rebel". In October of 2024, Walker was inducted into the Canadian Bluegrass Hall of Fame. Walker died on November 6, 2024 at the age of 85.

== Discography ==
=== Albums ===
Year	Group	Album	Instrument	Label
1961	Angus Walker and The Birch Mountain Boys	Blue Grass Songs	Lead vocals and rhythm guitar	Banff
1963	Angus Walker and The Birch Mountain Boys	Bluegrass Special	Lead vocals and rhythm guitar	Banff
1963	Brent & Harry	Country Special	Bass	Banff
1965	Allan Trineer	Allan Trineer-10 Jim Reeves Golden Hits	Vocals and rhythm guitar	Disques Major
1965	Bob King	A King in the Country	Bass	Banff
1966	Angus Walker and The Birch Mountain Boys	Let's Sing Bluegrass Songs (re-issue of "Blue Grass Songs")	Lead vocals and rhythm guitar	Rodeo
1966	June Davey with The Hackamores	Patsy Cline and Kitty Wells	Guitar and bass	Point
1967	Dougie Trineer and The Hackamores	Straight From the Heart	Guitar and harmony	Point
1967	The Hackamores	The Hackamores	Rhythm Guitar and vocals	Harmony
1975	Angus Walker and The Cabinet	Introducing Angus Walker: Canada's Prime Minister of Country Music	Lead vocals and rhythm guitar	Cynda
2016	Angus Walker and The Birch Mountain Boys	Blue Grass Songs (re-issue with bonus tracks)	Lead vocals and rhythm guitar	Rosedale
2017	Angus Walker and The Birch Mountain Boys	Bluegrass Special (re-issue with bonus tracks)	Lead vocals and rhythm guitar	Rosedale

=== Singles ===
Year	Single (A side/ B side)	CAN Country	Label
1960	Some Must Fail/I'm the One that Broke her Heart		Rodeo International
1964	Eatin' Outta Your Hand/Hit Parade of Love		Rodeo International
1965	Cadillacin' Around/Roses and Rings	#2 (A side)	Citadel
1969	Crazy Tricks/Movin' Man	#35 (A side)	Big Chief
1970	My Wife's Liberation Front/Canadian Country Music Man	#22 (B side)	Rodeo International
1971	Don't Wake the Sleeping Lion/ Parliament Hill	#18 (B side)	Rodeo International
1971	Ode to a Country Singer/Four Strong Winds		Cannon
1975	Diesel Drivin' Man/ Parliament Hill		Boot Records Limited
1975	Heavy Country Music/I'm a Believer		Cynda Records

=== Compilation albums ===
Year	Album name	Label
1962	George Beck Picks: The Top Country & Western Hits	Banff/Rodeo Records
1963	16 Great Country Songs by 16 Great Canadian Country Artists	Banff Records
1963	Angus Walker Picks: 16 Western and Country Hits	Rodeo International
1963	16 Great Songs of Praise	Rodeo International
1964	16 Great Country Songs by 16 Great Canadian Country Artists	Banff
1965	16 Great Canadian Country Artists	Rodeo International
1966	16 Bluegrass Favorites	Rodeo International
1966	Vic Mullen presents Countrytime Jamboree	Rodeo International
1967	16 Country Hits-Various Artists	Rodeo International
1985	50 Bluegrass Favorites Vol. 1 & 2	Holborne Distributing
1993	Nova Scotia Country	RMS Recordings/Atlantica Music
2015	Bluegrass Sing, Sing, Sing	Rosedale
