= Ben Kerr =

Canadian musician

- Born: April 27, 1930; Yarmouth, Nova Scotia, Canada
- Died: June 17, 2005 (aged 75); Toronto, Ontario, Canada
- Occupation: musician

Ben Kerr (April 27, 1930 – June 17, 2005) was a Canadian author, broadcaster, musician and perennial candidate, who was most famous as one of Toronto, Ontario's quirky street performers.

== Background ==
Kerr was born April 27, 1930 in Yarmouth, Nova Scotia to Benjamin Kerr, a professional golfer, and Mildred Audrey Torrance, a stenographer, and spent fifteen years in the Royal Canadian Air Force before settling in Toronto. In the 1960s, Kerr frequently played guitar in folk clubs in Toronto's Yorkville district working alongside groups such as Steppenwolf, the Mynah Birds, Rick James, Gordon Lightfoot and Joni Mitchell, and wrote songs for the then unknown Neil Young.

In 1969, he had a life changing experience when he gave up his three pack a day smoking habit and started taking a daily cayenne pepper cocktail. He credited the concoction with turning his health around and saving his life. He later wrote the book "The Cayenne Pepper Does it All" to document this experience.

Kerr was considered a "major promoter for Canadian Country Music artists" by the 1970's. In 1971, Kerr wrote "Parliament Hill" for Angus Walker who he was promoting at the time. "Parliament Hill" peaked at number 18 on RPM Country 50 rankings. On June 3, 1973, a group of twelve entertainers and promoters met at The Horseshoe Tavern, in Toronto, Ontario at formed the original board of directors for the Canadian Country Music Association. This group included Brent Williams, notable country and bluegrass entertainer, Jury Krytiuk, president of Boot Records, Bod Dalton, a promotor, Sean Eyre, DJ Lindsay, radio personality Harold Moon who worked for BMI Records, Jack Starr of The Horseshoe Tavern, Barry Haugen of RCA Records, Vic Folliott of Brantford Radio, Mary Butterill of CAPAC Publishing and Kerr. Kerr released "Shoes Keep on Walking" in the fall of 1973 and peaked at number 82 on RPM Magazine's ranking of country music songs.

For a time, Kerr was an executive at the Toronto Harbour Commission. A fervent anti-smoking crusader, he quit the job in a rage in 1981 when a co-worker blew smoke in his face. He wrote a song, "Fire on One End, a Fool on the Other", about the incident. This inspired him to run from Toronto to Los Angeles to promote a smoking ban in offices. The run took him six months. Also in 1981, Kerr released "Distilled Water", a song that peaked at number 27 on RPM Magazine's top 30 Canadian content list and number 64 on RPM Magazine's Top 75 Country Singles He was also in the 1982 Trees music video "Shock of the New", appearing as a guy with an oxygen mask and a shirt promoting clean air in offices. In 1987, he played a dead man in the basement of Casa Loma in B.D. Benedikt's Beyond the 7th Door.

== Post-retirement ==
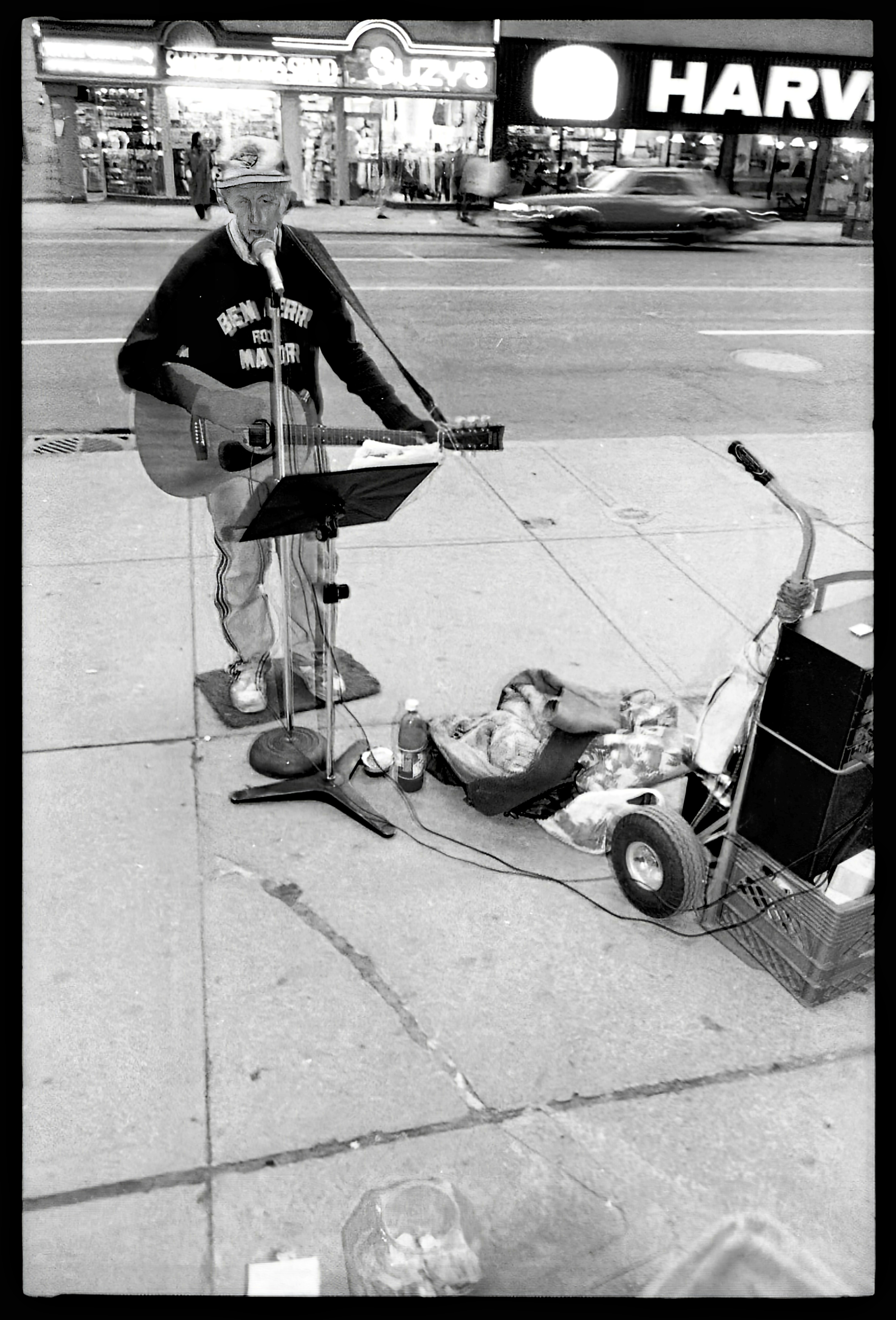
Ben Kerr busking in his usual spot on Bloor Street, just east of Yonge Street.

Kerr supported himself as a busker for the remainder of his life, singing with a karaoke machine in front of the Hudson's Bay department store at the corner of Yonge and Bloor streets. He was often voted "favourite street performer" in Now Magazine's annual Toronto survey, and it is rumoured that Kerr was once offered a recording contract with Sub Pop Records. He continued to appear frequently on radio and television as an advocate for the health benefits of cayenne pepper, and was the author of The Cayenne Pepper Cocktail Does it All.

As well, he was a perennial fringe candidate who ran in every Toronto mayoral election from 1985 until 2003, the last municipal election held before his death. In 1997, he placed fourth behind Mel Lastman, Barbara Hall and Don Andrews. In the 2000 election, he ran on a platform of waterfront renewal, backed by the self-penned campaign song "Fringe Candidate".

Ben Kerr died on June 17, 2005, at his home on Jones Avenue in Toronto, at the age of 75. In 2007, Toronto City Council approved a motion to name a laneway near the corner of Danforth and Jones in Kerr's honour. Ben Kerr Lane was officially named on May 25, 2008.

== Discography ==
=== Singles ===
Year	Single	CAN Country
1973	"Shoes Keep on Walking"	82
1981	"Distilled Water"	64
