= Country Sunshine with Myrna Lorrie =

1974 Canadian television miniseries

- Genre: country music
- Starring: Myrna Lorrie
- Country of origin: Canada
- Original language: English
- No. of seasons: 1
- No. of episodes: 3

Production
- Producer: Cy True
- Running time: 30 minutes

Original release
- Network: CBC Television
- Release: 25 July – 8 August 1974

Country Sunshine With Myrna Lorrie is a Canadian country music television miniseries that aired on CBC Television in 1974.

== Premise ==
Myrna Lorrie, who was a regular on Countrytime, hosted her own series which was produced at CBC Halifax. Eric Robertson was a regular performer.

== Scheduling ==
This half-hour series was broadcast on Thursdays at 9:30 p.m. (Eastern) from 25 July to 8 August 1974.
