= Fred McKenna =

Canadian singer, multi-instrumentalist, and producer

Fred McKenna (February 17, 1934 – November 18, 1977) was a Canadian singer, multi-instrumentalist, and producer born in Fredericton, New Brunswick. McKenna, who was born blind, recorded, produced, and released songs for the Rodeo, Boot, RCA and Arc record labels, and appeared on radio shows and television programs such as CBC's Singalong Jubilee. He worked with Stompin' Tom Connors, George Beck, Don Messer, Vic Mullen, George Hamilton and Angus Walker, among others.

McKenna is an inductee of both The Canadian Country Music Hall of Fame and The New Brunswick Country Music Hall of Fame.

== Early life ==
McKenna was raised in Fredericton but educated at the Halifax School for the Blind. At age 11, McKenna began learning how to play the guitar in the Hawaiian style from a neighborhood girl and later learned how to play the fiddle, mandolin and banjo in the same fashion. His first guitar was gifted to him by his parents. In addition, he also learned how to play the piano during his formal education in Halifax where he met his future wife Melva. He began playing local events and concerts by the time he had reached the age of 16.

== Music career ==
McKenna's professional music career began with his appearances "on the old Capital Co-op Saturday Night Jamborees heard over CFNB" before touring with Kidd Baker primarily in Ontario. Later he gained the attention of Don Messer after winning a spot and performing on WWVA's radio Jamboree who invited him on his show Don Messer's Jubilee on the CBC multiple times between 1958 and 1959. He also worked with George Beck, Angus Walker and others on CJCH radio program in Halifax releasing recordings with Beck and their band "The Maritime Playboys". McKenna also was part of the cast of CBC's Singalong Jubilee throughout its run between 1961 and 1970 and become "one of the most important ingredients of the show's recipe for success." Afterwards he made appearances on Countrytime, Singalong Jubilee's successor, up to 1973 and on Harry Hibb's at the Caribou.

McKenna recorded, released and played on many albums for the Rodeo, Arc, RCA and Camden labels including many songs written and arranged by himself. In addition "Sad Songs that Tell a Story" reached #86 on the Canadian Country charts. McKenna also produced a number of songs for other artists, such as Stompin' Tom Connor's "The Hockey Song". He also worked as a producer for Boot Records' budget label Cydna starting in 1972 and has credits including work for Stevedore Steve and Chris Scott. McKenna ended his career working as a music director for CHML Studios on the George Hamilton IV Show in Hamilton, Ontario.

== Death and legacy ==
McKenna spent his final years living in Toronto, Ontario. He was still working for The George Hamilton IV Show when he died at home in 1977 at the age of 43. He was memorialized on one of Anne Murray's albums where she is quoted as saying, "Dedicated to the memory of Freddy McKenna, the man who first introduced me to country music." "The Hockey Song" which he produced is still commonly played at NHL games and other hockey venues in Canada and the United States. McKenna was posthumously inducted into the New Brunswick Country Music Hall of Fame in 1986 and the Canadian Country Music Hall of Fame in 2010.
