= Country Sunshine =

Country Sunshine may refer to:

- "Country Sunshine" (song), a country song written by Dottie West in 1973
- Country Sunshine (Dottie West album), 1973
- Country Sunshine (Bruce Robison album), 2001
- Country Sunshine With Myrna Lorrie, a Canadian country music television miniseries
