= Two Sides (disambiguation) =

Two Sides is a 2012 compilation album by English multi-instrumentalist Mike Oldfield.

Two Sides or two sides may also refer to:

- "Two Sides", a song by Dutch symphonic metal band After Forever from the 2004 album Invisible Circles
- "Two Sides", a song by the American rock band Living Colour from the 2017 album Shade
- Two Sides, a 2019 Snapchat romance drama

== See also ==
- 2Sides (Side 1), a 2019 EP by Jason Derulo
- Two Sides of "Crash", a 1973 album by American country singer Billy "Crash" Craddock
- Two Sides Of, a 1985 album by Irish singer Daniel O'Donnell
- Two-sided
