= Sweet Dreams of Yesterday =

Single by Hank Smith
- Released: 1970
- Genre: Country
- Label: Quality
- Songwriter(s): Dick Damron

Hank Smith singles chronology
"Morgen" (1970)	"Sweet Dreams of Yesterday" (1970)	"The Final Hour" (1971)

"Sweet Dreams of Yesterday" is a single by Canadian country music artist Hank Smith. The song debuted at number 49 on the RPM Country Tracks chart on October 3, 1970. It peaked at number 1 on December 26, 1970.

== Chart performance ==
Chart (1970)	Peak position
Canadian RPM Country Tracks	1
