= Peggy Little =

American singer-songwriter

- Birth name: Peggy Little
- Born: August 8, 1942 (age 82); Marlin, Texas, U.S.
- Genres: Country
- Occupation: Singer
- Instrument: Vocals
- Years active: 1966–1974
- Labels: Philips; Dot; Epic

Peggy Little (born August 8, 1942) is an American country music singer best remembered for her country cover version of Dusty Springfield's "Son of a Preacher Man".

== Early years ==
Little was born in Marlin, Texas and raised in Waco, Texas. She began her career as a vocalist on a Waco radio station when she was 11 years old.

== Career ==
In the late 1960s and early 1970s, Little was a well-known figure to country music audiences with several charting records and multiple appearances on country music programs such as Hee Haw. She also made guest appearances on The Mike Douglas Show, Wilburn Brothers Show, Bill Anderson Show, Del Reeves Show, and The Ralph Emery Show.

Little recorded for Dot Records and later was on the Epic Records label. Little left the music industry in the mid-1970s and has not sung professionally in decades. She currently resides in her native Texas.

== Personal life ==
Little married when she was 16 and left show business to raise a family. That situation ended with a divorce in 1965.

== Discography ==
=== Albums ===
Title	Album details	Peak positions
Title	Album details	US Country
A Little Bit of Peggy	Release date: 1969; Label: Dot Records	22
More Than a Little	Release date: 1971; Label: Dot Records	—
"—" denotes releases that did not chart

=== Singles ===
Year	Single	Peak chart positions		Album
Year	Single	US Country	CAN Country	Album
1966	"Her Hurt Upon My Hands"	—	—	—
1968	"Beautiful World"	—	—	—
1968	"What Makes a Happy Woman Cry"	—	—	—
1969	"Son of a Preacher Man"	40	—	A Little Bit of Peggy
1969	"Sweet Baby Girl"	43	—	A Little Bit of Peggy
1969	"Put Your Lovin' Where Your Mouth Is"	44	38	More Than a Little
1969	"Son of a Preacher Man" (re-release)	—	—	A Little Bit of Peggy
1970	"Mama, I Won't Be Wearing a Ring"	37	—	More Than a Little
1970	"Good Day Sunshine" (with Tommy Overstreet)	—	—	—
1970	"I Knew You'd Be Leaving"	59	—	More Than a Little
1970	"My Santa in Tennis Shoes"	—	—	—
1971	"I've Got to Have You"	75	—	—
1971	"He Goes Walking Through My Mind"	—	—	—
1971	"Little Henry Hurt"	—	—	—
1972	"Little Golden Band"	—	—	—
1973	"Listen, Spot"	70	—	—
1973	"Sugarman"	37	—	—
1974	"Just for You"	—	—	—
"—" denotes releases that did not chart
