= The Final Hour =

Single by Hank Smith
- Released: 1971
- Genre: Country
- Label: Quality
- Songwriter(s): Dick Damron

Hank Smith singles chronology
"Sweet Dreams of Yesterday" (1970)	"The Final Hour" (1971)	"Where Do We Go from Here" (1971)

"The Final Hour" is a single by the Canadian country music artist Hank Smith. The song debuted at number 45 on the RPM Country Tracks chart on March 20, 1971, and peaked at number 1 on June 5, 1971.

== Chart performance ==
Chart (1971)	Peak position
Canadian RPM Country Tracks	1
Canadian RPM Adult Contemporary	31
