= African Nova Scotian Music Association =

Canadian non-profit organization

- Formation: 1997; 29 years ago
- Headquarters: 100 Ochterloney Street, Dartmouth, Nova Scotia, Canada
- Website: https://theansma.com

African Nova Scotian Music Association (ANSMA) is a non-profit organization purposed towards supporting African Nova Scotians in the music industry.

== Early history ==
In 1997, the African Nova Scotian Music Association was established in Nova Scotia, Canada.

Nearly 50 people belonged to ANSMA by February 1999, and the organization was represented on the board of the East Coast Music Association.

The first president of the association was Marc Perry. Lou Gannon was appointed president in 2003, six years after the organization's founding, and served until 2023.

== African Nova Scotian Music Association Awards ==
The ANSMA hosts the annual African Nova Scotian Music Association Awards. ANSMA held its first awards ceremony in November 1998.

The categories for awards show include Emerging Artist of the Year, Rising Star of the Year, Artist of the Year, Single of the Year, and Album/EP of the Year. Other awards include the Heritage Award, Pioneer Award, Lifetime Achievement Award, Industry Development Award, and the Portia White Youth Award.

=== ANSMA Lifetime Achievement Award ===
The African Nova Scotia Music Association presents a Lifetime Achievement Award to one individual each year during the association's annual award ceremony. The award is given to a musician or group that has impacted the African Nova Scotian music scene.

=== ANSMA Lifetime Achievement Recipients ===
- Bucky Adams (2007)
- Merrill Bruce (2009)
- Maurice Ruddick (2015)
- Brent Williams (2015)
- Linda Carvery (2016)
- Portia White (2017)
- Donnie Cromwell (2018)
- Jackie Richardson (2019)
- Joe Sealy (2020)
- Lorraine (Novalee) Buchan (2021)
