= Jack Hennig =

Canadian singer and musician

- Born: August 26, 1946 (age 78); Edmonton, Alberta, Canada
- Genres: Country; Adult contemporary music
- Occupation(s): Singer-songwriter, musician
- Years active: 1967–1980
- Labels: Appollo 70 Records, Boot Records, Quality Records,

Jack Hennig (born August 26, 1946, in Edmonton, Alberta) is a Canadian singer-songwriter. Hennig is best known for his Canadian hits "Lady Highway" (1976), "George the Hermit" (1978), "Mindy" (1978), and "Caught in the Middle" (1979). During the peak of his career between 1970 and 1980, Hennig placed nine songs on the Canadian RPM charts.

== Charting Songs ==
"Pappa Told Me", peaked at number 28 on the RPM Country Singles Chart (November 28, 1970).
"Lady Highway", peaked at number 20 on the RPM Adult Contemporary Chart (July 10, 1976).
"Craisy Daisy", peaked at number 38 on the RPM Country Singles Chart (October 30, 1976).
"Big City Lights", peaked at number 33 on the RPM Country Singles Chart (August 6, 1977).
"Candy and Brandy", peaked at number 31 on the RPM Adult Contemporary Chart (December 17, 1977), and at number 24 on the RPM Country Singles Chart (December 17, 1977).
"George the Hermit", peaked at number 12 on the RPM Country Singles Chart (August 12, 1978).
"Mindy", peaked at number 18 on the RPM Country Singles Chart (December 9, 1978).
"Last Summer's Love", peaked at number 67 on the RPM Country Singles Chart (March 24, 1979).
"Caught in the Middle", peaked at number 16 on the RPM Country Singles Chart (January 12, 1980).
