= Mile After Mile =

Single by Orval Prophet

from the album Mile After Mile
- Released: 1971
- Genre: Country
- Label: Columbia
- Songwriter: Gerry Joly

Orval Prophet singles chronology
"Country Fair" (1969)	"Mile After Mile" (1971)	"It's Good to Be Home Again" (1972)

"Mile After Mile" is a song written and composed in 1969 by Canadian singer-songwriter Gerry Joly. It was a 1971-72 hit single for Canadian country singer Orval Prophet. "Mile After Mile" debuted at number 49 on the RPM Country Tracks chart on September 25, 1971. It peaked at number 1 on January 8, 1972. Bobby Hachey covered "Mile After Mile" a few years later.

As a Franco-Ontarian, Joly wrote and sang in both English and French. His French version of the song, "Mille après mille", was made famous by Willie Lamothe and was subsequently recorded by a number of French Canadian artists, including Patrick Norman, Renée Martel, Paul Brunelle, Stephen Faulkner, Plume Latraverse, Laurence Jalbert, Les Respectables and Fred Pellerin. On the 2012 special to promote her new French-language album Sans attendre, Céline Dion performed "Mille après mille" in duet with Pellerin.

Joly wrote "Mile After Mile" when arriving in Elliot Lake after a series of mechanical problems with his car.

== Chart performance ==
Chart (1971–1972)	Peak position
Canadian RPM Country Tracks	1
