= Where Do We Go from Here (Hank Smith song) =

Single by Hank Smith
- Released: 1971
- Genre: Country
- Label: Quality
- Songwriter(s): Dick Damron

Hank Smith singles chronology
"The Final Hour" (1971)	"Where Do We Go from Here" (1971)	"Together Again" (1972)

"Where Do We Go from Here" is a single by Canadian country music artist Hank Smith. The song debuted at number 48 on the RPM Country Tracks chart on September 4, 1971. It peaked at number 1 on November 27, 1971.

== Chart performance ==
Chart (1971)	Peak position
Canadian RPM Country Tracks	1
