= Everybody's Going to the Country =

Single by Hank Smith
- Released: 1975
- Genre: Country
- Label: Quality
- Songwriter(s): Dick Damron

Hank Smith singles chronology
| "But Tomorrow There's Another Day" (1973) | "Everybody's Going to the Country" (1975) | "If You Don't Laugh, I Promise I Won't Cry" (1975) |

"Everybody's Going to the Country" is a single by Canadian artist Hank Smith. The song was released in 1975. It reached number one on the RPM Country Tracks chart in Canada in April 1975.

== Chart performance ==
| Chart (1975) | Peak position |
|---|---|
| Canadian RPM Country Tracks | 1 |
