= Eddie Fontaine =

American actor

- Born: Edward Reardon; March 6, 1927; Springfield, Massachusetts, U.S.
- Died: April 13, 1992 (aged 65); Roselle, New Jersey, U.S.
- Occupation: Actor
- Children: 2

Eddie Fontaine (March 6, 1927 – April 13, 1992) was an American actor and singer, best known for television roles in the 1960s and 1970s.

== Biography ==
Born Edward Reardon in Springfield, Massachusetts, Fontaine signed as a vocalist with RCA in 1954 after serving in the US Navy. In 1955, he appeared at the Brooklyn Paramount Theater in disc jockey Alan Freed's first rock and roll show. He also sang in the Jayne Mansfield movie The Girl Can't Help It (1956).

Musically, he is best remembered for his 1958 single "Nothin' Shakin' (But the Leaves on the Trees)", which was part of The Beatles early repertoire. (The British star Billy Fury released a version in 1964.) He is listed as a "legend" but not an inductee at the Rockabilly Hall of Fame site.

Fontaine moved to Van Nuys, California, in the 1960s after singing in night clubs in pre-Castro Cuba. He landed a role in the World War II series The Gallant Men, in which he played ladies' man PFC Pete D'Angelo, and occasionally sang.

Although he never won another regular role in a television series, Fontaine made many guest appearances on shows such as 77 Sunset Strip, Baretta, Happy Days, The Rockford Files (as a different character in four episodes) and Quincy.

In 1984, Fontaine was convicted in a murder-for-hire case. According to police documents, in 1983, he approached a country singer with the promise of a recording contract with RCA and a large sum of money if the man were to kill his estranged wife, with whom he was engaged in a custody battle. He was sentenced to four years in a California prison. He had previously been convicted of child molestation and grand larceny. Fontaine successfully appealed his murder-for-hire conviction based on the trial judge's rulings concerning these earlier offenses.

Fontaine was referenced in television's Saturday Night Live (season 12, episode 2, first broadcast on October 18, 1986); during a Weekend Update appearance, Dana Carvey impersonated American disc jokey Casey Kasem, responding to a letter from a viewer wanting to know what happened to Fontaine, and revealing (in an upbeat manner) Fontaine's imprisonment for attempted murder.

Fontaine made his last TV appearance in the NBC TV series Sisters in 1991, and died of throat cancer the following year at age 65 in Roselle, New Jersey.
