= Eddie Hodges =

American actor and singer

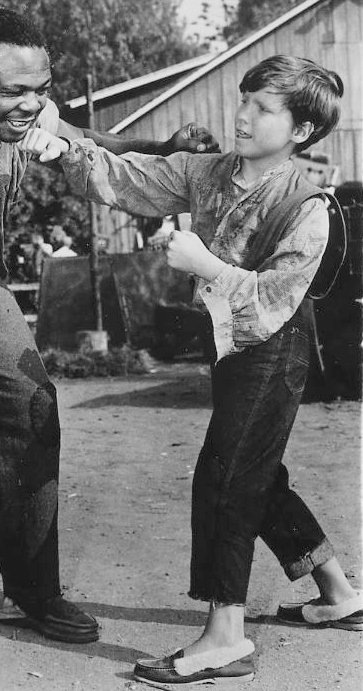
- Hodges and Archie Moore on the set of The Adventures of Huckleberry Finn, 1960
- Born: March 5, 1947 (age 79); Hattiesburg, Mississippi, U.S.
- Occupations: Actor, singer, mental health counselor
- Years active: 1953–1969
- Children: 2

Samuel "Eddie" Hodges (born March 5, 1947) is an American former child actor and recording artist. His 1961 cover of the Isley Brothers' single "I'm Gonna Knock on Your Door" reached number 1 in Canada, the Netherlands, Sweden and Australia, and rose to number 12 on the U.S. Billboard Hot 100 chart. When Hodges became an adult, he made the decision to leave show business.

== Early life ==
Hodges was born in Hattiesburg, Mississippi, United States, and traveled to New York City with his family in 1952. This began a long career in show business for Hodges in films, on stage, and in popular recordings.

== Career ==
=== Stage ===
At the age of ten, Hodges made his professional acting debut on stage in Meredith Willson's 1957 Broadway musical The Music Man, in which he originated the character of Winthrop Paroo, and introduced the song "Gary, Indiana", with Robert Preston and Pert Kelton.

=== Film ===
Hodges made his film debut in the 1959 film A Hole in the Head with Frank Sinatra and Edward G. Robinson, in which Hodges and Sinatra performed the Oscar-winning song "High Hopes". However, when Sinatra recorded the song for Capitol Records, Hodges was not invited to participate because his own record label, Decca, would not grant him permission to record with Capitol.

Hodges acted in eight feature films and made numerous TV guest appearances. He is probably best remembered for playing the title role in Michael Curtiz's 1960 film The Adventures of Huckleberry Finn. He also appeared in the 1962 film Advise and Consent in a minor role as well as the Disney films Summer Magic (1963) and The Happiest Millionaire (1967).

=== TV ===
On October 4, 1957, the day the Soviet Union launched the Sputnik 1 satellite, Hodges made a memorable appearance on the game show Name That Tune. He partnered with Major John Glenn, the future astronaut and U.S. senator, in an event later dramatized in the 1983 motion picture The Right Stuff. (In the film, Hodges is played by child actor Erik Bergmann.)

On August 2, 1959, Hodges was the celebrity mystery guest on the popular TV panel show What's My Line? He also made guest appearances on shows such as The Dick Van Dyke Show (1964, "The Lady and the Babysitter" S4 E3), Bonanza (1965, "A Natural Wizard" S7 E13), Gunsmoke (1967, “Mail Drop” S12 E19), Family Affair, and Cimarron Strip.

In 1963, Hodges played a supporting role as Billy Jones opposite fellow child actor Kevin Corcoran in Johnny Shiloh, which originally aired as two episodes of Walt Disney's Wonderful World of Color.

In the early 1990s, the adult Hodges appeared live on a talk show on Swedish TV, where he played guitar and sang "I'm Gonna Knock on Your Door".

=== Recording ===
Hodges issued his first single in 1958, a duet with Julia Meade called "What Would It Be Like in Heaven?" In 1959 at age 12, Hodges became Mississippi's first Grammy Award winner for his contribution to the original Broadway cast album of The Music Man, on which he sang a solo ("The Wells Fargo Wagon") and was credited as lead singer on the song "Gary, Indiana". It was the first year the Grammys were awarded.

In 1961, at age 14, Hodges recorded his biggest hit for Cadence Records, "I'm Gonna Knock on Your Door". He also scored a minor hit with "(Girls, Girls, Girls) Made to Love", a song written by Phil Everly and originally recorded by the Everly Brothers. He subsequently recorded for several other record labels, issuing a total of 15 singles as a performer between 1958 and 1967.

Before leaving Hollywood he was a union musician, record producer, songwriter and music publisher. He collaborated with Tandyn Almer as both co-writer and co-producer on a single that failed to chart.

== Personal life ==
Hodges was drafted into the Army during the Vietnam War in the late 1960s but remained in the U.S. in a non-combat assignment. After he was discharged, he returned to Hollywood and became disillusioned with show business. He decided to return to his native Mississippi and entered the University of Southern Mississippi, where he received his B.S. in Psychology and an M.S. in Counseling. He became a mental health counselor and eventually retired from practice after a long career in the field. He converted to Catholicism in 1998.

Hodges is divorced and the father of two grown children and grandfather of six. He occasionally gets in touch with his old show business friends and still writes songs, although he is no longer able to play guitar due to spinal nerve injuries. Hodges survived the passage of Hurricane Katrina, which ravaged coastal areas of Mississippi and Louisiana in August 2005; he informed his fans that he was fine after being without water, electricity and telephone/internet contact for 19 days until local utilities were finally restored.

== Filmography ==
Year	Title	Role	Notes
1959	A Hole in the Head	Ally Manetta	
1960	The Adventures of Huckleberry Finn	Huckleberry Finn	
1962	Advise and Consent	Johnny Leffingwell	
1963	Summer Magic	Gilly Carey	
1967	C'mon, Let's Live a Little	Eddie Stewart	
1967	The Happiest Millionaire	Livingston	
1968	Live a Little, Love a Little	Delivery Boy	

== Discography ==
=== Charting singles ===
Year	Single	US Hot 100	Canada	UK
1961	"I'm Gonna Knock on Your Door"	12	1	37
1962	"Bandit of My Dreams"	65	-	-
1962	"(Girls, Girls, Girls) Made to Love"	14	1	37
1965	"New Orleans"	44	22	-

== Bibliography ==
- Holmstrom, John. The Moving Picture Boy: An International Encyclopaedia from 1895 to 1995. Norwich, Michael Russell, 1996, p. 264.
