= Two Sides of "Crash" =

Studio album by Billy "Crash" Craddock
- Released: 1973
- Genre: Country
- Label: ABC
- Producer: Ron Chancey

Billy "Crash" Craddock chronology
You Better Move On (1972)	Two Sides of "Crash" (1973)	The Best of Billy "Crash" Craddock (1973)

Singles from Two Sides of 'Crash'
- 1. "Nothin' Shakin' (But Leaves on the Trees)" Released: February 21, 1972; 2. "I'm Gonna Knock on Your Door" Released: June 27, 1972; 3. "Afraid I'll Want to Love Her One More Time" Released: November 8, 1972; 4. "Don't Be Angry" Released: February 20, 1973

Professional ratings
Review scores
Source	Rating
Allmusic	2/5 stars

Two Sides of "Crash" (also known as Afraid I'll Want to Love Her One More Time) is an album by country singer Billy "Crash" Craddock. It was released in 1973 on ABC Records. It was produced by Ron Chancey.

== Track listing ==
1. "Afraid I'll Want to Love Her One More Time"
2. "What Does a Loser Say"
3. "Another Cup of Memories"
4. "Don't Be Angry"
5. "A Living Example"
6. "I'm a White Boy"
7. "I'm Gonna Knock on Your Door"
8. "Come a Little Bit Closer"
9. "You Can't Judge a Book By the Cover"
10. "Ain't Nothin' Shakin'"
