= The Wise Guys (1972 film) =

- French: Les Smattes
- Directed by: Jean-Claude Labrecque
- Written by: Jean-Claude Labrecque; Clément Perron; Lise Noiseux
- Produced by: Pierre Lamy
- Starring: Donald Pilon; Daniel Pilon
- Cinematography: Guy Dufaux
- Edited by: Pierre Leroux
- Music by: Jacques Perron
- Production companies: Cinak Compagnie Cinématographique; Les Productions Carle-Lamy; Les Filmes Jean-Claude Labrecque
- Distributed by: Les Films Mutuels
- Release date: April 20, 1972
- Running time: 86 minutes
- Country: Canada
- Language: French

The Wise Guys (French: Les Smattes) is a Canadian crime drama film, directed by Jean-Claude Labrecque and released in 1972. Labrecque's first narrative feature film after a career making documentaries, the film centres on Pierre Drouin (Donald Pilon) and Réjean Cardinal (Daniel Pilon), two friends in the Gaspésie region of Quebec who become fugitives after refusing to leave their village when the provincial government orders it to be shut down.

The cast also includes Marcel Sabourin, Louise Laparé, Marcel Martel and Pierre Dagenais.

The film premiered in Quebec theatres on April 20, 1972. It was subsequently screened in the Directors' Fortnight stream at the 1972 Cannes Film Festival.
