= Bucky Adams =

Canadian jazz and blues tenor saxophonist (1937-2012)

- Birth name: Charles Richmond Adams
- Born: April 25, 1937; Halifax, Nova Scotia
- Died: July 13, 2012 (aged 75); Halifax, Nova Scotia
- Genres: Jazz
- Occupation: Musician
- Instrument: Saxophone

Charles Richmond Adams (April 25, 1937 – July 13, 2012), known as "Bucky" Adams, was a Canadian jazz and blues tenor saxophonist with a musical career spanning over 60 years. Throughout his long career, Adams shared the stage with or performed for notables like Queen Elizabeth II, B.B. King, Louis Armstrong, Dizzy Gillespie, Count Basie, Lionel Hampton, Oscar Peterson, and Rosa Parks. At the time of his death in Halifax, Nova Scotia, Adams was a longtime fixture of the jazz scene in eastern Canada.

== Early life ==
Charles Richmond "Bucky" Adams was born in Halifax, Nova Scotia, on April 25, 1937. He was the son of the late Charles Augustus Adams and Susie Bertha Adams. His uncle was Barbadian politician Grantley Adams. He and Wayne Adams were cousins.

When he was a young boy, Adams, who was nurtured in a musical family on Maynard Street in Halifax, started playing the trumpet to accompany his father, who played the saxophone.

At just 9 years old, Bucky played trumpet in a Barnum and Bailey Circus parade on the Halifax Common—his first job. He gave a performance for Queen Elizabeth II when she visited Canada in 1948 when he was just 11 years old.

During one of his regular performances at the Gerrish Street Hall in his hometown of Halifax, a young Bucky Adams played his trumpet so passionately that it physically broke. Bucky sprinted home to retrieve his father's saxophone and came back in time to take the stage once more. He fell in love with the tenor saxophone as a result, which he continued to play throughout his career.

== Career ==
Adams started leading his own bands while playing saxophone in the 1950s and continued to do so until the 1980s, rising to the position of respected bandleader. Rockin' Rebels, The Unusuals, Generations, and Basin Street Trio are just a few of the successful bands he established.

By 1970, he joined Joe Sealy and Chuck Cornish in The Unusuals, a group that launched its own afterhours club.

Basin Street Trio, a band that was established in 1975, performed at the Privateers Warehouse on Halifax Harbour's waterfront. Their first record, Bucky Adams & Basin Street: At Privateers' Warehouse, which was recorded at Solar Audio in Dartmouth, Nova Scotia, would be released in 1976.

Adams led a group called East Coast Jazz in 1984. The five-member ensemble played twice a week at Dieppe's Junction Club. By that time, Adams had released two albums. He had also met greats like Louis Armstrong, B.B. King, and Lionel Hampton, and performed with B. B. King, Moe Koffman, and Vera Lynn.

Bucky Adams began volunteering at the Harbourview Lounge in Halifax's Northwood Centre in the early 1990s, and in 1993 he started working with the Nova Scotia Mass Choir. Bucky also established himself as a regular performer at the annual Halifax Jazz Festival.

With the exception of one song, Bucky created or co-wrote all the tracks on his 1996 album, "In a Lovin' Way." The album received two award nominations upon its 1997 release. Adams was nominated for the 1998 East Coast Music Awards in both Jazz and Blues-Gospel categories.

On September 16, 1998, he opened the Harvest Jazz & Blues Festival at The Playhouse in Fredericton.

During Dr. Rosa Parks' visit to Halifax in 1998 to receive an honorary doctorate from Mount Saint Vincent University, he gave a performance for her.

== Death ==
Charles "Bucky" Adams died on July 13, 2012, in Halifax, Nova Scotia, Canada at the age of 75 years old.

== Honors and awards ==
- Recipient of the International Gabriel Award (1981)
- Nominated for two East Coast Music Awards (1997)
- Recipient of the African Nova Scotian Music Association's "Pioneer" Award (1998)
- Recipient of the African Nova Scotian Music Association's Lifetime Achievement Award (2007)
- Recipient of the Queen Elizabeth II Diamond Jubilee Medal (2012)
- Recipient of the Dr. Helen Creighton Lifetime Achievement Award (2013)
- The African Canadian Recording of the Year Award was renamed the Bucky Adams Memorial Award by the East Coast Music Awards and the African Nova Scotian Music Association
