= I Ain't Never =

Single by Mel Tillis

from the album I Ain't Never
- B-side: "Burden Of Love"
- Released: July 1972
- Recorded: May 26, 1972
- Genre: Country
- Length: 2:09
- Label: MGM 14418
- Songwriter(s): Mel Tillis, Webb Pierce
- Producer(s): Jim Vienneau

Mel Tillis singles chronology
"Would You Want the World to End" (1972)	"I Ain't Never" (1972)	"Neon Rose" (1973)

Official audio
- "I Ain't Never" on YouTube

"I Ain't Never" is a song co-written by American country music artists Webb Pierce and Mel Tillis. Each co-writer recorded the song separately, with both Pierce's (1959), and years later Tillis's (1972, although Tillis had previously recorded the song in 1962), with both versions resulting in major hits.

== Background ==
According to Tillis, he wrote the song himself, and agreed to credit Pierce as a co-writer in exchange for a pair of boots Pierce was wearing when Tillis pitched him the song. In Tillis's words, "Them old boots cost me over eight hundred thousand dollars" in royalties.

== Chart performance ==
Pierce's version was released in 1959, eventually spending nine weeks at No. 2 on the Billboard Hot C&W Sides chart that year (held out by "The Three Bells (Les Trois Cloches)" by The Browns). The pop market accepted the Webb Pierce version, crossing it into the Billboard Top 40 and peaking at #24.

=== Webb Pierce ===
Chart (1959)	Peak position
US Hot Country Songs (Billboard)	2
US Billboard Hot 100	24

=== Mel Tillis ===
Tillis's 1972 recording of the song was his first No. 1 hit on the Billboard Hot Country Singles (now Hot Country Songs) charts. The success of this version was limited to country music stations.

Chart (1972)	Peak position
U.S. Billboard Hot Country Singles	1
Canadian RPM Country Tracks	1

=== The Lowes ===
Chart (1987)	Peak position
U.S. Billboard Hot Country Singles	70

== Additional recordings ==
Since its original release, the song has been recorded by several other artists, including: Jimmie Vaughan, Roger Miller, Little Richard, The Jordanaires and Charley Crockett
