= Moon-Man Newfie =

Single by Stompin' Tom Connors

from the album Love & Laughter
- Released: February 1972
- Genre: Country
- Label: Boot
- Songwriter: Stompin' Tom Connors

Stompin' Tom Connors singles chronology
"Name the Capital" (1971)	"Moon-Man Newfie" (1972)	"The Bug Song" (1972)

"Moon-Man Newfie" is a single by Canadian country music artist Stompin' Tom Connors. The song debuted at number 48 on the RPM Country Tracks chart on February 26, 1972. It peaked at number 1 on May 6, 1972.

== Chart performance ==
Chart (1972)	Peak position
Canadian RPM Country Tracks	1
