= Marcel Martel (musician) =

Canadian singer

Marcel Martel (February 1, 1925 – April 13, 1999) was a French Canadian singer-songwriter and composer. Born in Drummondville, Quebec, and playing country music since childhood, Martel first found success in 1947 with his songs "La Chaine de nos coeurs" and "Souvenir de mon enfance". Over the course of a thirty five-year career, he released nearly two hundred records, frequently collaborating with his wife Noëlla Therrien, his daughter Renée Martel, and fellow Québécois country singer Paul Brunelle.

He also had a small acting role, appearing as himself, in the 1972 film The Wise Guys (Les Smattes).
