= I'm Gonna Knock on Your Door =

1959 Isley Brothers song

- Picture sleeve of U.S. Cadence single

Single by Eddie Hodges
- B-side: "Ain't Gonna Wash for a Week"
- Released: June 1961
- Genre: Pop
- Length: 2:03
- Label: Cadence
- Songwriters: Aaron Schroeder and Sid Wayne
- Producer: Archie Bleyer

Eddie Hodges singles chronology
"I'm Gonna Knock on Your Door"	"Bandit of My Dreams"

"I'm Gonna Knock on Your Door"

Single by Billy "Crash" Craddock

from the album Two Sides of "Crash"
- B-side: "What He Don't Know Won't Hurt Him"
- Released: 1972
- Recorded: 1972
- Genre: Country
- Length: 2:08
- Label: ABC
- Songwriters: Aaron Schroeder and Sid Wayne
- Producer: Ron Chancey

Billy "Crash" Craddock singles chronology
"Nothin' Shakin' (But the Leaves on the Trees)" (1972)	"I'm Gonna Knock on Your Door" (1972)	"Afraid I'll Want to Love Her One More Time" (1972)

"I'm Gonna Knock on Your Door", written by Aaron Schroeder and Sid Wayne, is a song that was originally released by the Isley Brothers in 1959 and became a hit for teenage American actor Eddie Hodges in 1961. The song peaked at #12 at Billboard Hot 100 chart, and became a #1 hit in Canada, Australia, Sweden, and the Netherlands.

== Cover versions ==
- Billy "Crash" Craddock, on his album Two Sides of "Crash", in 1972; it became a big country hit.
- Jimmy Osmond, in 1974, reached # 11 on the UK singles chart.
- Former Beatles drummer Pete Best in 1964, with his group, the Pete Best Four.
- In Swedish, three lyric versions exist, "Mina kärleksbrev dom vill jag ha igen" ("My love letters, I want them again") written by Åke Gerhard and released in 1961 as recorded by Lill-Babs, "Min lägenhet den vill jag ha igen" ("My flat, I want it again") written by Einar Svensson and released as recorded by Thorleifs on the 1974 album "En dag i juni" and "Två ska man va'" ("Two shall you be"), written by Christer Lundh and released as recorded by Lotta Engberg on the 1988 album 100%.

== Chart performance ==
=== Eddie Hodges ===
Chart (1961)	Peak position
Belgium (Ultratop 50 Flanders)	9
Belgium (Ultratop 50 Wallonia)	25
Canada (CHUM Hit Parade)	1
Netherlands (Single Top 100)	1
Norway (VG-lista)	2
Sweden (Tio i Topp)	1
UK Singles (OCC)	37
US Billboard Hot 100	12
Australia (ARIA)	1

=== Billy "Crash" Craddock ===
Chart (1972)	Peak position
U.S. Billboard Hot Country Singles	5
Canadian RPM Country Tracks	1

=== Jimmy Osmond ===
Chart (1974)	Position
Australia (Kent Music Report)	93
United Kingdom (Official Charts Company)	11
