= Countrytime (1960 TV program) =

- Genre: Rural current affairs
- Presented by: John Ross (1960–62); John Foster (1962–63); George Atkins (1963–66)
- Country of origin: Canada
- Original language: English

Production
- Producers: Renee Elmer; John Foster
- Running time: 30 minutes

Original release
- Network: CBC Television
- Release: 1960 – 1966

Countrytime is a Canadian agricultural news and informational television program which aired on CBC Television from 1960 to 1966.

== Premise ==
This current affairs program was produced as separate regional versions in Halifax, Toronto, Winnipeg, and Vancouver. The first half of each episode featured 15 minutes of national agricultural news, then the remainder of the program contained regional news and information. For example, Ontario and Quebec viewers saw Earl Cox with a gardening segment, while Atlantic Canadians saw Gordon Warren on their broadcasts.

This program is distinct from CBC's Countrytime country music television program which was produced during the 1970s.

== Scheduling ==
This half-hour program was broadcast from 1960 to 1966.
