= Made in Japan (song) =

- Japanese release picture sleeve

Single by Buck Owens

from the album In the Palm of Your Hand
- B-side: "Black Texas Dirt"
- Released: April 3, 1972
- Genre: Country
- Length: 2:45
- Label: Capitol
- Songwriters: Bob Morris; Faye Morris
- Producer: Buck Owens

Buck Owens singles chronology
"I'll Still Be Waiting for You" (1972)	"Made in Japan" (1972)	"You Ain't Gonna Have 'Ol Buck to Kick Around No More" (1972)

"Made in Japan" is a 1972 single by Buck Owens from the album In the Palm of your Hand. Released through Capitol Records on April 3, 1972, "Made in Japan" was Owens' last number one on the Hot Country Songs chart as a solo artist. The single stayed at number one for a single week and spent a total of 13 weeks on the chart. The melody employs a major pentatonic scale, giving it its distinct, anhemitonic sound.

== Background and composition ==
The song was written by Bob and Faye Morris and was released through Capitol Records in April 1972. Don Rich provided the backing guitars for the song.

== Reception ==
Music writer Doug Davis said of the song, it "will no doubt ring some cash registers for Buck Owens, as do most of his records." Davis called the song a "surprise," citing the anhemitonic sound and called Owens a "country music whiz."

John Sieger of Urban Milwaukee branded "Made in Japan" as "a great song" in a 2019 piece. Siegel complimented the work of Rich on the work. He conceded that while the looping three-cord backing track isn't exciting, it allowed viewers to focus on the lyricism and story of the song.

Kevin John Coyne of Country Universe appreciated the use of "Eastern instrumentation" in the song, which he said elevated the musicality in a 2025 review. Coyne also appreciated that the lyrics did not turn into an overseas one-night stand, and instead it is the woman who is committed to another man, thus contributing to Owens' distressed vocals. Coyne gave the song an "A" grade.

== Charts ==
Chart (1972)	Peak position
Australia (Kent Music Report)	17
U.S. Billboard Hot Country Singles	1
Canadian RPM Country Tracks	1
