= Together Again (Hank Smith song) =

Single by Hank Smith
- Released: January 18, 1972
- Genre: Country
- Label: Quality

Hank Smith singles chronology
| "Where Do We Go from Here" (1971) | "Together Again" (1972) | "Take Me Home" (1972) |

"Together Again" is a single by Canadian country music artist Hank Smith. The song debuted at number 49 on the RPM Country Tracks chart on January 22, 1972. It peaked at number 1 on May 27, 1972.

== Chart performance ==
| Chart (1972) | Peak position |
|---|---|
| Canadian RPM Country Tracks | 1 |
| Canadian RPM Adult Contemporary | 7 |
