= That's Why I Love You Like I Do =

"You're the Reason I'm In Love"

Single by Sonny James
- A-side: "Young Love"
- B-side: "You're the Reason I'm In Love"
- Released: 1956
- Recorded: 1956
- Genre: Country
- Length: 1:56
- Label: Capitol
- Songwriter(s): Jack Morrow

"That's Why I Love You Like I Do"

Single by Sonny James

from the album That's Why I Love You Like I Do
- B-side: "Still Water Runs Deep"
- Released: April 1972
- Recorded: November 20, 1968; March 1969 and December 1969, March 1972 (overdubs)
- Genre: Country
- Length: 2:44
- Label: Capitol
- Songwriter(s): Jack Morrow
- Producer(s): Kelso Herston

Sonny James singles chronology
"Only Love Can Break a Heart" (1972)	"That's Why I Love You Like I Do" (1972)	"When the Snow is on the Roses" (1972)

"That's Why I Love You Like I Do" is a country music song originally made famous by Sonny James. The song had two runs of popularity for James, one in 1956 and the other in 1972, each under a different title and with a distinctive arrangement.

== History ==
=== 1956 version ===
James' original version was recorded in 1956 as "You're the Reason I'm In Love," for the beginning line of the refrain. An electric guitar-heavy, slow-tempoed song, "You're the Reason ..." was the B-side to the better-known "Young Love" (James' first major hit). While "Young Love" went on to be a massive country and pop hit, "You're the Reason ..." concurrently fared well on country radio, reaching No. 6 of the Billboard magazine Most Played C&W by Jockeys chart in early 1957.

It was recorded the same day as Young Love (October 30, 1956) at Bradley Studio in Nashville TN. Production by Ken Nelson and the vocal backing of The Jordanaires, who are known primarily for their vocal backing behind Elvis Presley.

=== 1972 version ===
In late 1971, James was about to wrap up a successful stay at Capitol Records, a run that had seen him score 16 consecutive No. 1 songs in as many single releases. In March 1972, his cover of Gene Pitney's "Only Love Can Break a Heart" stopped at No. 2 (held out by labelmate Freddie Hart's "My Hangup is You"), the first James song that failed to reach the top of Billboard's Hot Country Singles chart since 1967.

James, meanwhile, had re-recorded "You're the Reason ..." in a faster-tempoed rendition, complete with a horn section. The new version was retitled "That's Why I Love You Like I Do" (for the last line in the refrain), and was released in April. By mid-June, James had returned to the top of the Billboard country chart.

The song became James' 22nd No. 1 hit; had "Only Love Can Break a Heart" reached the top, "That's Why I Love You ..." would have been his 18th straight No. 1 song. It was also James' final No. 1 hit — and major hit — for Capitol Records; during 1972, he signed a contract with Columbia Records, where he had two more No. 1 hits (including the follow-up, "When the Snow is on the Roses") and several more Top 10 hits.

== Charts ==
Chart (1972)	Peak position
U.S. Billboard Hot Country Singles	1
Canadian RPM Country Tracks	1
