= Joyce Seamone =

Canadian country singer

- Origin: Woodstock, Ontario, Canada
- Genre: Country
- Occupation: Musician
- Instrument: Singing
- Labels: Marathon; Boot

Joyce Seamone is a Canadian country singer. She is most noted for her single "Testing 1-2-3", which was a number one hit on Canada's country music charts in 1972.

Originally from Maplewood, Nova Scotia, Seamone moved to Woodstock, Ontario in the 1960s for work. While living in Woodstock she signed to Marathon Records, and released the single "Testing 1-2-3" in 1972. The single, the title track from her debut album, peaked at #1 in the RPM country charts the week of August 19, 1972, and Seamone was the only Canadian female country singer to score a #1 hit with her debut single through the entire 1970s. However, the album did not spawn any further chart hits. She released her second album, Merry Christmas from Joyce Seamone, later the same year.

Her third album, 1973's Stand By for a Special Announcement, performed poorly on the charts, with its title track peaking at #69 in RPM the week of September 15, 1973. She was then dropped from Marathon Records and signed to Boot Records, which released her fourth album I Can See It in His Eyes in 1975. That album also did not give Seamone any notable hit singles; she then made her second and final appearance in the country top 40 in 1978 with the non-album single "There's More Love Where That Came From" reaching #14 in 1978.

She moved back to Nova Scotia in the 1980s, where she started her own independent label and released a new album, The Other Side of Me, independently in 1994. She was also an organizer of the Fox Mountain Music Festival, served on the board of directors for the Nova Scotia Country Music Hall of Fame, and continued to perform regional shows at music festivals in the Maritimes. In 2019, she returned to Woodstock to perform a show for the first time since moving back to Nova Scotia.

== Discography ==
- Testing 1-2-3 (1972)
- Merry Christmas from Joyce Seamone (1972)
- Stand By for a Special Announcement (1973)
- I Can See It in His Eyes (1975)
- The Other Side of Me (1994)
