= Paul Brunelle =

Canadian country singer (1923-1994)

- Born: June 10, 1923; Granby, Quebec, Canada
- Died: November 24, 1994 (aged 71); Granby, Quebec, Canada
- Genres: Country
- Occupation(s): Singer, songwriter, guitarist
- Instrument: Guitar

For the Member of Parliament, see Paule Brunelle.

Paul Brunelle (June 10, 1923 – November 24, 1994) was a singer, songwriter and country guitarist of western Quebec. He is considered the pioneer of country in Quebec and the main source of influence on the artist who would popularize the genre, Willie Lamothe. Brunelle continued with RCA until 1975, and then continued to record on the Bonanza label.

== Career ==
Born in 1923, Brunelle was one of the child singers in his hometown of Granby early in 1930. Employed at the Miner Rubber, he bought his first guitar on credit for $6.50.

During the war, he won twice, in 1943 and 1944, the amateur competition by Living Room Furniture, organized by AM radio CKAC. The first 78 rpm was launched in 1944, marketed by RCA Victor, attempting with this artist to compete with Soldat Lebrun. "Women, You're Pretty" appeared in September, then "My Child, I Forgive You" in October of that year. This last piece is an adaptation to French of the traditional song "When It's Springtime in the Rockies". The success of Brunelle was immediate. He also broadcast a program on CKAC in 1945, and apparently sold 200,000 copies of "Cruel Destiny." This was followed by inter alia, "On This White Rock", in December 1946, "In a Night of Stars" in August 1947, then in 1948, "The Song of the Vagabond" (in April) and "In the Distance There in my Prairie" (July).

From 1949 to 1951, Brunelle went on tour throughout Quebec with Antoine Grimaldi. His wife, Suzanne Brunelle, accompanied the troupe, which also offered dance numbers and comedy. The troupe visited possibly the provinces of Ontario and the Maritimes.

From 1955 to 1957, he would daily moderate on radio CKVL, Montreal, the show "Paul Brunelle and his Troubadours." He is best known in the US for his 1955 novelty yodeling hit, "The Cowboy of the Mountains."

In the year 1960, a contract with RCA Victor and London allowed the singer to launch in 33 rpm format several compilations of his previous hits.

Paul Brunelle is considered, along with Marcel Martel and Willie Lamothe, as one of three major Quebec country artists. Brunelle is regarded as one who has laid the foundation of Belle Province country music before Wille Lamothe popularized it with a wider audience in the decades that followed, including the medium of television and its popular show, "The Willie Ranch."

Paul Brunelle continued his career until early 1980, when a cancer of the throat forced an end to his career as a musician. In the last years of his life, he would appear on stage only on rare special occasions, most recently in 1992. He died in 1994 in his hometown, Granby.

In 2005 the label, Experience, issued a compilation compact disc of sixteen remastered hits originally recorded between 1945 and 1957. Billboard additionally lists four 2007 US CD album releases from Brunelle on the DDM and Select labels, and an additional three songs appearing on three different Quebec Country compilations featuring various artists of the genre.
