= The Bailey Brothers and the Happy Valley Boys =

The Bailey Brothers and the Happy Valley Boys were an American bluegrass act widely considered to be among the first to cultivate the duo harmony vocal technique widely used in modern bluegrass music today. Charlie Bailey (February 11, 1916 in Happy Valley, Tennessee, near Rogersville – March 12, 2004 in Bear, Delaware) began his musical career in 1936. His brother, Danny Bailey (December 1, 1919, Happy Valley, Tennessee – March 22, 2004, Knoxville, Tennessee), teamed up with him in 1940, and the brothers began making frequent appearances on Tennessee radio stations in the Knoxville area. Danny formed the Happy Valley Boys after Charlie joined the military in 1941.

In 1944 the Happy Valley Boys relocated to Nashville, where they became members of the Grand Ole Opry, and also made regular appearances on WSM-AM radio in Nashville. At that time, Danny was the youngest person to ever perform on the Grand Ole Opry. When Charlie returned from his military service in 1946 the brothers were reunited as a duo but only stayed in Nashville briefly before returning to radio work in Knoxville. The Bailey brothers came from a musical family and began playing music early in their lives. Charlie displayed a desire to pursue music very early in his life buying his first guitar for $1.75. Their parents had hoped that Danny would become a doctor but sensing that the pull toward music was stronger, they encouraged Danny to join his brother who had already begun making a name for himself musically. The Bailey Brothers and the Happy Valley Boys members included from 1949: Charles Bailey on mandolin, guitar, vocals; Daniel Bailey playing guitar, vocals; Carl Bailey on guitar; and E.P. Tullock on bass. Other members had included (from 1946): L.E. White, fiddle; Wiley Birchfield, banjo; Ray Brewster, guitar and mandolin; Willie Brewster, vocals, guitar, and mandolin; Cotton Gaylon, Hawaiian guitar; and Larry Mathis, banjo. George Shuffler also played bass with the group for a time.

== Career ==
A 1946 article gives us a few more tidbits about the Bailey Brothers, then Charlie and Danny and the rest of the Happy Valley Boys. The author of the article Juanita Milligan tells readers that she had seen the band at a packed house in the Maryville Armory. By that time, they had been on WSM for a couple of years. But had moved to WCHS in Charleston, WV where they were doing a daily morning show at 5:30am. Playing with the Bailey Brothers at that performance was Ruhl Kelly, who had worked with Roy Rogers in Hollywood. The Brothers also had 5 record releases on Rich-R-Tone Records of Johnson City Tennessee including: Rattlesnake Daddy RRT 421 on March 15, 1949. Also Alabama RRT 446 on April 4, 1949. Source rich-r-tone.com.http://www.rich-r-tone.com/

== Obituary ==
Charles Bailey and his brother Dan, better known as The Bailey Brothers, performed on WSM's Grand Ole Opry during the early days of bluegrass and attained near legendary status in such locales as WNOX Knoxville, Tennessee, WPTF Raleigh, North Carolina and WWVA in Wheeling, West Virginia. They are considered by some to be among the most influential and significant artists in early bluegrass history. It was The Bailey Brothers who brought their tight, close harmony style singing into bluegrass and merged the two forms. With the addition of their Happy Valley Boys, The Bailey Brothers were the first well-known brother duet to introduce the beautiful harmonies characteristic of early brother duets into the full bluegrass group. They also collected, arranged and popularized numerous songs, many of them now bluegrass standards, which were brought to wide public attention later by other groups. Songs made popular by The Bailey Brothers have been recorded by Dolly Parton, Emmylou Harris, Flatt and Scruggs, among others. Many well-known country musicians either got their start with The Bailey Brothers or worked with them early in their career, including Tennessee Ernie Ford, Tater Tate, Buck Graves, Carl Butler, and the Osborne Brothers. Although their contribution to the roots of bluegrass has been recognized by the Smithsonian and music historians, commercial fame eluded the talented, innovative Bailey Brothers. As Rounder Records noted on their "Have You Forgotten The Bailey Brothers" release, "That music and musicians of this calibre could be overlooked for so long is a cultural tragedy which we hope this record will remedy.
