= Dianne Leigh =

- Born: 1940 or 1941 (age 85–86); Toronto, Ontario
- Genres: country
- Years active: 1960s-1976
- Website: www.dianneleigh.ca

Dianne Leigh (born c. 1941, sometimes spelled as Diane Leigh) is a Canadian country music performer. She was the first recipient of the Gold Leaf Award (later the Juno Awards) in 1970.

In 1994, music trade publication RPM considered her the ninth top Canadian country artist of the past 30 years based on her standings in the publication's charts.

Leigh recorded in the late 1960s for the American label Chart Records but failed to make the US charts with any single releases. Her Canadian hits "The Wife You Save May Be Your Own" (written by Liz Anderson) and "I'm Gonna Let George Do It" are featured in the 1969 Chart compilation album Best of Our Country Girls with additional tracks by Lynn Anderson, Maxine Brown, Connie Eaton, and LaWanda Lindsey.

In the 1970s, she was a co-host on the CHCH-TV series The Harry Hibbs Show and also recorded for Ray Griff's Global Television series.

== Awards and recognition ==
- 1965: RPM Awards, top country female singer
- 1970: Gold Leaf Award, Best Country Female Artist
- 1971: nominated, Juno Award, Best Country Female Artist
- 1974: nominated, Juno Award, Best Country Female Artist
- 2015: Canadian Country Music Hall of Fame inductee

== Singles ==
| Year | Single | Peak chart positions | | |
| Year | Single | CAN Country | CAN | CAN AC |
|---|---|---|---|---|
| 1964 | "Biggest Hurt of All" | 4 | — | — |
| 1965 | "Won't Be a Lonely Summer" | — | 16 | — |
| 1965 | "Shadows of Your Heart" | 1 | — | — |
| 1966 | "Woman and Man" | — | — | 6 |
| 1966 | "Why Can't He Be You" | 3 | — | — |
| 1967 | "The Sound That Makes Me Blue" | 1 | — | — |
| 1968 | "The Wife You Save May Be Your Own" | 13 | — | — |
| 1968 | "Keep the Home Fires Burning" | 8 | — | — |
| 1969 | "I'm Gonna Let George Do It" | 13 | — | — |
| 1969 | "I'm a One Man Woman" | 23 | — | — |
| 1970 | "I'm Your Puppet" | 32 | — | — |
| 1972 | "Sing Happy" | 1 | — | — |
| 1972 | "Long Lonely Road" | 18 | — | — |
| 1972 | "I'll Count Every Hour" | 25 | — | — |
| 1973 | "Blind Jonathon/Make It Over The Hill" | 12 | — | — |
| 1974 | "His Kind of Woman" | 15 | — | — |
| 1974 | "God's People Are One" | 7 | — | — |
| 1976 | "Go Gently" | 13 | — | — |
