= Ann (Don't Go Runnin') =

Single by Tommy Overstreet

from the album This Is Tommy Overstreet
- B-side: "Within This World of Mine"
- Released: December 1971
- Recorded: December 1971
- Genre: Country
- Label: Dot
- Songwriter(s): Buzz Cason
- Producer(s): Ricci Mareno

Tommy Overstreet singles chronology
| "I Don't Know You (Anymore)" (1971) | "Ann (Don't Go Runnin')" (1971) | "A Seed Before the Rose" (1972) |

"Ann (Don't Go Runnin')" is a single by American country artist Tommy Overstreet. Released in December 1971, it was the first single from his album This Is Tommy Overstreet. The song peaked at No. 2 on the Billboard Hot Country Singles chart, his highest-charting single on the chart. It also reached No. 1 on the RPM Country Tracks chart in Canada, and was his only chart-topper there.

== Charts ==
=== Weekly charts ===
| Chart (1972) | Peak position |
|---|---|
| US Hot Country Songs (Billboard) | 2 |
| Canadian RPM Country Tracks | 1 |

=== Year-end charts ===
| Chart (1972) | Position |
|---|---|
| US Hot Country Songs (Billboard) | 32 |
