= Sing Happy =

Single by Dianne Leigh
- Released: 1972
- Genre: Country
- Label: Quality

Dianne Leigh singles chronology
"I'm Your Puppet" (1970)	"Sing Happy" (1972)	"Long Lonely Road" (1972)

"Sing Happy" is a single by Canadian country music artist Dianne Leigh. The song was released as a single in 1972. It peaked at number 1 on the RPM Country Tracks chart on July 1, 1972.

== Chart performance ==
Chart (1972)	Peak position
Canadian RPM Country Tracks	1
