= Renée Martel =

French-Canadian country singer (1947–2021)

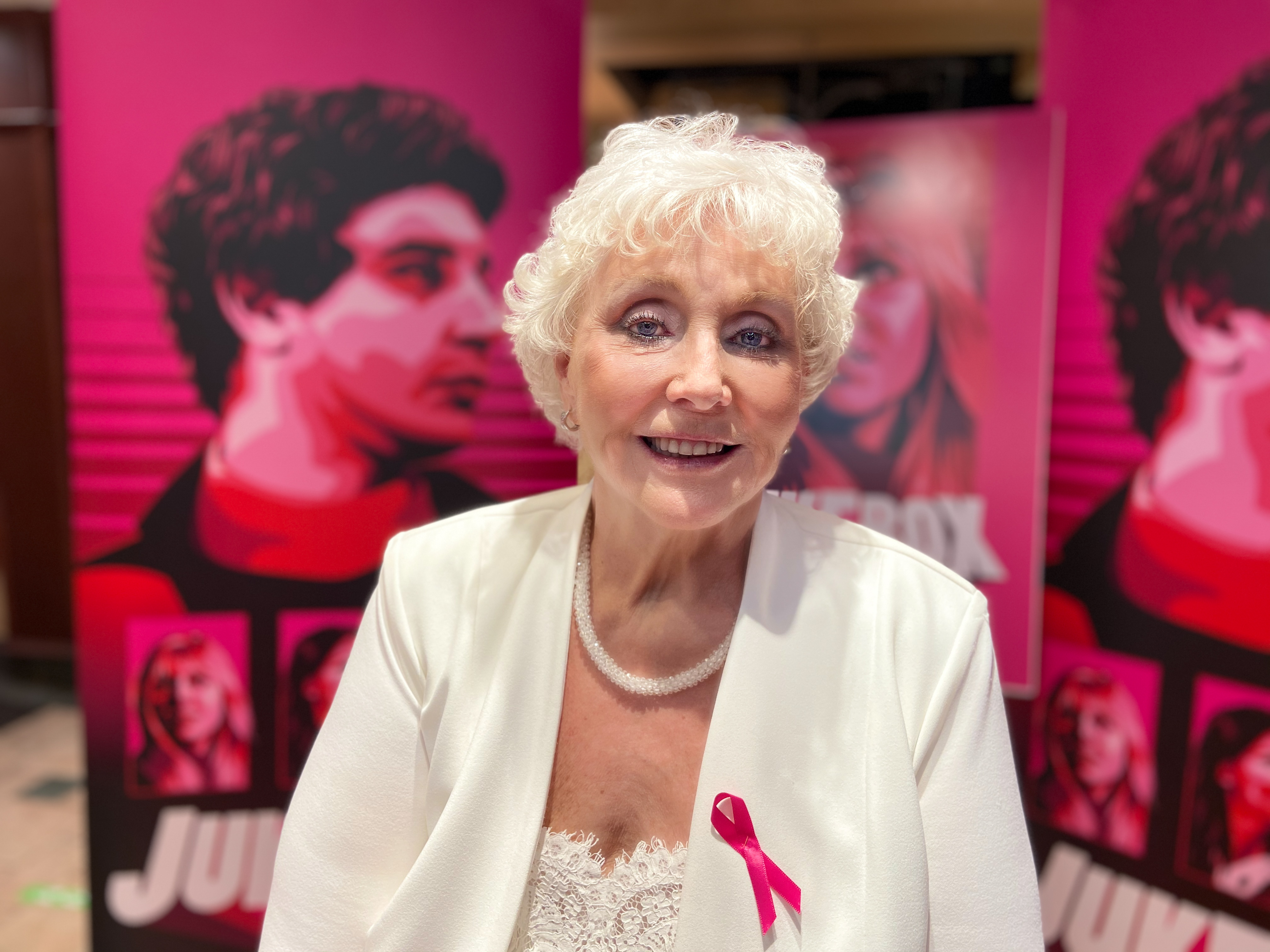
- Martel in 2020

Background information
- Born: 26 June 1947; Drummondville, Quebec, Canada
- Died: 18 December 2021 (aged 74) Saint-Hyacinthe, Quebec, Canada
- Genres: Franco country; Country pop; Yé-yé
- Occupations: Singer, songwriter
- Years active: 1964–2021
- Labels: Meteor; Apex; DSP; Spectrum; RCA; Trans-World; Polydor; Les Disques Star Records; Disques Mérite; Unidisc
- Formerly of: Marcel Martel; Michel Pagliaro; Michèle Richard; Patrick Norman

Renée Martel (26 June 1947 – 18 December 2021) was a French Canadian country singer. Her father was country singer Marcel Martel.

She died from pneumonia on 18 December 2021, at the age of 74.
