= Smiling Wine =

Single by Shirley Eikhard

from the album Shirley Eikhard
- Released: 1972
- Genre: Country, pop
- Label: Capitol
- Composer(s): Sylvia Tyson
- Producer(s): Earl Ball

Shirley Eikhard singles chronology
"Something in Your Face" (1971)	"Smiling Wine" (1972)	"Right on Believing" (1973)

"Smiling Wine" is a song written by Sylvia Tyson, and most notable in a version recorded as a single by Canadian artist Shirley Eikhard. Eikhard's version of the song debuted at number 42 on the RPM Country Tracks chart on February 26, 1972. It peaked at number 1 on April 22, 1972.

== Chart performance ==
Chart (1972)	Peak position
Canadian RPM Country Tracks	1
Canadian RPM Adult Contemporary	1
Canadian RPM Top Singles	49
