= Hank Smith (singer) =

- Born: September 15, 1934; Garmisch-Partenkirchen, Bavaria, Germany
- Died: October 19, 2002 (aged 68) Edmonton, Alberta, Canada
- Genres: Country
- Occupation: Singer
- Instrument: Vocals
- Years active: 1963–1999
- Label: Quality
- Formerly of: Wild Rose Country

Hank Smith, CM (September 15, 1934 – October 19, 2002) was a Canadian country music singer.

He was born in Garmisch-Partenkirchen, Germany and moved to Canada in 1957. He founded the band Wild Rose Country in 1963 and recorded ten albums. Twelve of Smith's singles made the RPM Country Tracks charts, including five which went to Number One.

Hank Smith was the founding president of the Academy of Country Music Entertainment in 1976, now the Canadian Country Music Association.

Smith was appointed a Member of the Order of Canada in 1994.

== Chart singles ==
Year	Single	Chart Positions	
Year	Single	CAN Country	CAN AC
1970	"Sharing the Good Life"	42	—
1970	"Morgen"	44	—
1970	"Sweet Dreams of Yesterday"	1	—
1971	"The Final Hour"	1	31
1971	"Where Do We Go from Here"	1	—
1972	"Together Again"	1	7
1972	"Take Me Home"	19	20
1973	"But Tomorrow There's Another Day"	18	22
1975	"Everybody's Going to the Country"	1	—
1975	"If You Don't Laugh, I Promise I Won't Cry"	15	—
1976	"Give Me a Country Song"	29	—
1978	"Baby Sittin' with the Blues"	57	—
