= Orval Prophet =

- Also known as: Orval Rex Prophet; Johnny Six
- Born: Orval William Prophet; 31 August 1922
- Origin: Edwards, Ontario, Canada
- Died: 4 January 1984 (aged 61)
- Genres: country
- Occupation: Singer-songwriter
- Instruments: guitar
- Years active: 1944–1983
- Labels: Decca, Broadland

Orval William Prophet (31 August 1922 – 4 January 1984) was among the first Canadian country music performers to achieve a career of international scope.

== Early life ==
Prophet was born in Edwards, Ontario, now part of Ottawa. During his teens, he sang pop songs within his family and performed at church and community functions. He changed his focus to country music after he heard Hank Snow's music and concluded that "Western folk-songs would fit my style".

During World War II, Prophet worked on his family's farm since health limitations precluded him from military service. He performed for injured soldiers in Ottawa, walking 38 kilometres (24 mi) from his home to their hospital.

He is a second cousin of Ronnie Prophet who is also a country musician.

== Career ==
From 1944 to 1949, he performed throughout eastern Ontario in a country band led by Bill Sheppard. In Ottawa, his live radio performances were featured on CFRA's Fiddler's Fling from 1947 to 1951. A Canadian tour with Wilf Carter in 1949 led to Prophet's recording contract with Decca Records by late 1951. This made Prophet among the earliest Canadian country music artists who recorded in a Nashville studio.

During his early career, he worked on his family's 140 acres (57 ha) farm and was also a carpenter by trade. He remained based in Edwards throughout most of his career, becoming known as "The Canadian Ploughboy". His initial reason for remaining in Canada was to remain with his girlfriend. In April 1954, Prophet became a million-selling artist in terms of record sales following successful songs such as "Going Back to Birmingham", "Judgement Day Express" and "Beautiful Bells".

Prophet recorded the song "Mademoiselle" under the name "Johnny Six", released in 1958. Around that time he had a brief residency in the United States to host a radio programme.

Other appearances included CBC Television's The Tommy Hunter Show and at the Grand Ole Opry in Nashville.

== Influence ==
When Waylon Jennings was working as a radio host prior to his singing career, he sought to adopt Prophet's singing style. Johnny Cash and Dallas Harms also wrote material for Prophet.

== Death and legacy ==
Prophet underwent open heart surgery in 1970 following a series of five heart attacks. After this, he continued to perform until his last concert on New Year's Eve at the end of 1983. On 4 January 1984, Prophet was shovelling snow at his residence in Edwards when he died of a heart attack. He was survived by his second wife, Laurette Lalonde. His first wife, Lois Haley, died in 1969.

Later that year he was inducted into the Canadian Country Music Association Hall of Honour and in 1989 into the Canadian Country Music Hall of Fame.

== Discography ==
=== Albums ===
Year	Album	CAN Country
1958	Foreign Love Affair (as Johnny Six)	—
1959	Propheteering	—
1963	The Travelin' Kind	—
1971	Mile After Mile	—
1976	My Kind of Woman	—
1981	True Blue	—
1981	The Canadian Ploughboy	23
1995	The Traveling Snowman	—

=== Singles ===
Year	Single	CAN Country
1951	"Going Back To Birmingham" (as Orval Rex Prophet)	—
1951	"Judgement Day Express" (as Orval Rex Prophet)	—
1958	"Mademoiselle" (as Johnny Six)	—
1962	"Run Run Run"	—
1962	"Lois And Me"	—
1966	"The Traveling Snowman"	—
1967	"Human Nature"	1
1968	"Blue Side of the Street"	27
1969	"Country Fair"	—
1971	"Mile After Mile"	1
1972	"It's Good To Be Home Again"	8
1972	"Headin' Down The Line"	—
1972	"Judgement Day Express"	15
1973	"Champlain and St. Lawrence Line"	18
1974	"Badger Bodine"	32
1974	"Eastbound Highway"	9
1975	"My Kinda Woman"	—
1976	"Lisa Mae"	8
1977	"Leroy Can't Go Home"	11
1978	"Where Have All The Cowboys Gone"	19
1978	"Ol' Amos"	14
1979	"I've Seen Some Things"	43
1979	"Sorry and the Hobo"	10
1979	"The Mighty Tractor Pull"	70
1980	"The Canadian Ploughboy"	—
1981	"True Blue"	—
1981	"A Little League in Heaven"	39
