= Boot Records =

Defunct Canadian record label

- Founded: 1971
- Founder: Stompin' Tom Connors; Jury Krytiuk
- Distributor(s): Holburn
- Genre: Country, folk, bluegrass
- Country of origin: Canada
- Location: Toronto, Ontario

Boot Records was a Canadian country, bluegrass, and contemporary folk label formed in 1971 in Toronto by Stompin' Tom Connors and his manager, Jury Krytiuk.

== Early years ==
Originally started as a format for Connors' recordings, Boot shortly after began adding other Canadian country artists, including Don Sullivan, the first (and to date) the only Irish singer/songwriter to record an album of his own material in Nashville at 'Studio B' entitled, 'Sullivan Dreams'. A single from Sullivan's album was number 3 on CFGM playlist along with Gordon Lightfoot and Kris Kristofferson at number 1 and number 2. Con Archer, the instrumental group The Emeralds, Humphrey and the Dumptrucks, Sharon Lowness, Dick Nolan, Stevedore Steve, and Ted Wesley. In 1973, The Boot Master Concert series was started under the direction of Eleanor Koldofsky, and released LPs by Liona Boyd, Rita MacNeil, The Canadian Brass, the pianist Monica Gaylord, and the Ukrainian-born bass Yosyp Hoshuliak. Stompin' Tom would go on to release 29 records during the 70s.

== Budget and bluegrass ==
Cynda, the budget label, reissued LPs by Connors and released LPs by artists of various countries and regions of Canada, the popular Irish-Canadian group Larry McKee and the Shandonairs, and later devoted a division to bluegrass, which included releases by Bluegrass 4, Bruce County, Cody, Cross Country Grass, Dixie Flyers, Humber River Valley Boys, Angus Walker, Dennis LePage and Station Road, Whiskey Jack, as well as Native artists like Morley Loon, Charlie Panigoniak, and Willie Thrasher.

== 1970s releases ==
Other acts that released on Boot Records in the 1970s were: Maria Kasstan, Donna and Leroy, Jack Hennig, The McManus Bros, Whiskey Jack, Alex Fraser, Ray Griff, Joe Firth, Jack Holland, Ian Tyson, Chris Hennessy, The Cambridge Buskers, Leo Karz Stompers, Phil Bond, John Ham, Par Three, Mushroom (Ireland), Lincoln, Joyce Seamone, De Danann (Ireland), Gerry O'Kane (Ireland), Barley Bree (Ireland), The Bushwackers Band (Australia), John Boland and Beothuck, The Molly McGuires, and Ray Smith.

== 1980s releases ==
The 1980s saw a little more diversity, maintaining many of the 1970s artists and also adding: Lynn Larabie, Kelly Kavanagh, Wiz Bryant, Blackstrap (Canada), Kelita Haverland, The Schryer Triplets, The Emeralds (Canada), Ted Woloshyn, Richard Gulley, The Ladies Choice Bluegrass Band, Mendelson Joe, Ryan's Fancy, Cliff Edwards, Barry Smith and Inuk singer Charlie Panigoniak.

== Legacy ==
The label became mostly inactive by the end of the 1980s.
