= Nothin' Shakin' =

"Nothin' Shakin' (But the Leaves on the Trees)"

Single by Eddie Fontaine
- B-side: "Oh, Wonderful Night"
- Released: July 14, 1958
- Genre: Rockabilly
- Length: 2:54
- Label: Sunbeam
- Songwriter(s): Eddie Fontaine; Cirino Colacrai; Diane Lampert; John Gluck, Jr.

Eddie Fontaine singles chronology
"Goodness, It's Gladys!" (1963)	"Nothin' Shakin' (But the Leaves on the Trees)" (1958)	"Nobody Else Can Handle This Job But Me" (1958)

"Nothin' Shakin' (But the Leaves on the Trees)" is a song written by Eddie Fontaine, Cirino Colacrai, Diane Lampert and John Gluck, Jr. Fontaine first recorded it in 1958 for Sunbeam Records, which released it as a single with the Arnie Goland Orchestra included in the artist's credit. The record reached number 64 on the Billboard Hot 100.

The song was covered by The Beatles on 23 July 1963 on the Pop Go the Beatles series on BBC, and is included on their 1994 compilation album Live at the BBC.

In 1972, a version by Billy "Crash" Craddock reached number 10 on the Billboard Hot Country Singles and the top position on the Canadian RPM Country Tracks charts.
