= Countrytime (1970 TV program) =

- Genre: Music
- Presented by: Don Tremaine (1970–73); Mike Graham (1973–74)
- Starring: Myrna Lorrie
- Country of origin: Canada
- Original language: English
- No. of seasons: 4

Production
- Producer: Cy True
- Production location: Dartmouth, Nova Scotia
- Running time: 30 minutes

Original release
- Network: CBC Television
- Release: 28 February 1970 – 3 April 1974

Countrytime is a Canadian country music television program that aired on CBC Television from 1970 to 1974.

== Premise ==
This concert-style country music program was hosted by Myrna Lorrie. It was produced by CBC Halifax and recorded in Dartmouth, Nova Scotia, first at Dartmouth High School's auditorium, then from 1972 at Prince Andrew High School which had greater capacity. Vic Mullen and house band The Hickorys regularly appeared on the program. Visiting artists included The Allan Sisters, Wilf Carter, Blake Emmons, Lynn Jones and The Mercey Brothers.

This program is distinct from CBC's Countrytime rural current affairs program which aired during the 1960s.

== Scheduling ==
This half-hour program was first broadcast on Saturdays at 10:30 p.m. from 28 February 1970 to 28 July 1973, except for some mid-year breaks and repeat broadcasts. During the NHL season, it followed the Hockey Night in Canada broadcasts.

Countrytime was rescheduled to Thursdays at 9:30 p.m. from 4 October 1973 to 3 January 1974, then finally on Wednesdays at 10:30 p.m. from 30 January to 3 April 1974.
