= Myrna Lorrie =

Canadian singer

- Birth name: Myrna Lorraine Petrunka
- Born: August 6, 1940 (age 84); Cloud Bay, Ontario, Canada
- Origin: Fort William, Ontario
- Genres: Country

Myrna Lorraine Petrunka (born August 6, 1940), known professionally as Myrna Lorrie, is a Canadian country singer/songwriter/musician.

Lorrie first sang publicly at age 11 on Fort William radio station CKPR on a program called School of the Air, whose host, Jack Masters, gave Lorrie her own radio show, Harmony Trails, when she was just 12. At age 14 she wrote and recorded the song "Are You Mine" with Buddy DeVal, which was released on Abbott Records and reached number 6 on the Billboard Chart. The song became a hit in both Canada and the United States and was recorded by several artists; it peaked at No. 2 on the Billboard and Cashbox charts in early 1956. She was voted Best New Female Singer by fan polls in both Billboard and Cashbox magazines in 1955. The Lorrie/De Val team was a part of numerous Grand Ole Opry packages in 1956.

== Biography ==
On January 10, 1957, Lorrie had her first recording session for RCA, at the RCA Victor Studio 1 in New York. Her first producer was Steve Sholes, who had signed Jim Reeves and The Browns, Hank Snow, Eddy Arnold, Chet Atkins and Elvis Presley. Nine months later, on October 31, 1957, Lorrie recorded at RCA Victor Studio on McGavock Street in Nashville, with Chester B. Atkins. The recording included a song written by Lorrie called "Tradewinds".

On first tour in the United States, she opened for stars such as Hank Snow, Marty Robbins, Johnny Cash, Kitty Wells, and Sonny James. She appeared on the Grand Ole Opry broadcast as a guest of Hank Snow. Later she toured with Faron Young. Skeeter Davis, Ferlin Husky, and Porter Wagoner.

She recorded several hits for Columbia Records, including "Tell Me Not to Go", "Turn Down the Music", and "Changing of the Seasons". She totaled six number one hits in Canada.

== Discography ==
=== Albums ===
Title	Details
It's Countrytime	Release date: 1970; Label: MCA Records
Myrna Lorrie	Release date: 1971; Label: Harmony Records
Blue Blue Me	Release date: 1989; Label: Sibley Records
Child to Woman	Release date: 1998; Label: EMI Music Canada

=== Singles ===
Year	Single	Peak positions		Album
Year	Single	CAN Country	US Country	Album
1955	"Are You Mine?" (with Buddy DeVal)	—	6	—
1955	"I'm Your Man" (with Buddy DeVal)	—	—	—
1955	"Life's Changing Scene"	—	—	—
1956	"Tears Amid the Laughter"	—	—	—
1957	"Die, I Thought I Would"	—	—	—
1957	"Moonshy"	—	—	—
1964	"Do You Wish You Were Free"	2	—	—
1965	"I Can't Live with Him"	1	—	—
1966	"Your Special Day (Happy Birthday Mom)"	5	—	Myrna Lorrie
1967	"No Love Like Mine"	—	—	Myrna Lorrie
1967	"Tell Me Not to Go"	1	—	Myrna Lorrie
1968	"Turn Down the Music"	1	—	Myrna Lorrie
1968	"Changing of the Seasons"	4	—	Myrna Lorrie
1971	"Bringing Mary Home"	37	—	It's Countrytime
1989	"Blue Blue Me"	25	—	Blue Blue Me
1989	"Sometime"	—	—	Blue Blue Me
"—" denotes releases that did not chart
