= Tommy Overstreet =

American country music singer (1937–2015)

- Birth name: Thomas Cary Overstreet
- Also known as: T.O.
- Born: September 10, 1937; Oklahoma City, Oklahoma, U.S.
- Origin: Abilene, Texas, United States
- Died: November 2, 2015 (aged 78); Hillsboro, Oregon, U.S.
- Genres: Country, Nashville sound
- Occupation(s): Singer, songwriter
- Instrument(s): Guitar, vocals
- Years active: 1968–1986
- Labels: Dot, ABC, Elektra

Thomas Cary Overstreet (September 10, 1937 – November 2, 2015) was an American country music singer. Often referred to as "T.O." by fans and radio disc jockeys, Overstreet had five top-five hit singles in the Billboard country charts and 11 top-10 singles. His popularity peaked in the 1970s. He lived in Hillsboro, Oregon.

== Early life ==
Born in Oklahoma City, Oklahoma, United States, Overstreet grew up in both Houston and Abilene, Texas. He decided on a singing career when he was young, influenced largely by his cousin, "Uncle" Gene Austin. Austin was a singing star of the 1920s and 1930s.

== Career ==
Overstreet's musical career started when he was 17, singing on country and western star Slim Willet's television show in Abilene. In the late 1950s, Overstreet started a group called The Shadows.

In 1960, Overstreet recorded in New York City at Roulette Records, with Doc Severinsen on trumpet, Sam "The Man" Taylor on saxophone, and the Ray Charles Singers singing backup.

In 1967, Overstreet was hired to manage Dot Records in Nashville, Tennessee. In 1970, he decided to pursue a recording career, quickly establishing himself as a country hit maker that very year with a top-five hit, "Gwen (Congratulations)", which peaked at number five on the Billboard country music chart.

Overstreet made frequent guest appearances on the TV variety show Hee Haw. His highest charting Billboard hit was 1972's "Ann (Don't Go Runnin')", which went to number two.

His other top-20 hits were "I Don't Know You Anymore" (number five in 1971), "Heaven is My Woman's Love" (number three in 1972), "Send Me No Roses" (number seven in 1973); "I'll Never Break These Chains" (number seven in 1973), "(Jeannie Marie) You Were a Lady" (number seven in 1974), "If I Miss You Again Tonight" (number eight in 1974), "I'm a Believer" (number 9 in 1975), "That's When My Woman Begins" (number six in 1975), "If Love was a Bottle of Wine" (number 11 in 1976), "Don't Go City Girl on Me" (number five in 1977), "Yes, Ma'am" (number 12 in 1978), and "Fadin' In, Fadin' Out" (number 11 in 1978).

Overstreet died at his home in Oregon on November 2, 2015. He had been suffering from a variety of undisclosed ailments in recent years.
