= List of Academy of Country Music Awards ceremonies =

This is a list of Academy of Country Music Awards ceremonies and the winners in each ceremony.

== Ceremonies ==
Below is a list of ceremonies, the years the ceremonies were held, their hosts, the television networks that aired them, and their locations.

| Order | Date | Host(s) | Network | Site |
|---|---|---|---|---|
| 61st | May 17, 2026 | Shania Twain | Amazon Prime Video | MGM Grand Garden Arena, Las Vegas, Nevada |
| 60th | May 8, 2025 | Reba McEntire | Amazon Prime Video | Ford Center at The Star, Frisco, Texas |
| 59th | May 16, 2024 | Reba McEntire | Amazon Prime Video | Ford Center at The Star, Frisco, Texas |
| 58th | May 11, 2023 | Dolly Parton and Garth Brooks | Amazon Prime Video | Ford Center at The Star, Frisco, Texas |
| 57th | March 7, 2022 | Dolly Parton, Jimmie Allen, and Gabby Barrett | Amazon Prime Video | Allegiant Stadium, Las Vegas, Nevada |
| 56th | April 18, 2021 | Keith Urban and Mickey Guyton | CBS | Grand Ole Opry House, Ryman Auditorium, and Bluebird Café in Nashville, Tennessee |
| 55th | September 16, 2020 | Keith Urban | CBS | Grand Ole Opry House, Ryman Auditorium, and Bluebird Café in Nashville, Tennessee |
| 54th | April 7, 2019 | Reba McEntire | CBS | MGM Grand Garden Arena, Las Vegas, Nevada |
| 53rd | April 15, 2018 | Reba McEntire | CBS | MGM Grand Garden Arena, Las Vegas, Nevada |
| 52nd | April 2, 2017 | Luke Bryan and Dierks Bentley | CBS | T-Mobile Arena, Las Vegas, Nevada |
| 51st | April 3, 2016 | Luke Bryan and Dierks Bentley | CBS | MGM Grand Garden Arena, Las Vegas, Nevada |
| 50th | April 19, 2015 | Luke Bryan and Blake Shelton | CBS | AT&T Stadium, Arlington, Texas |
| 49th | April 6, 2014 | Luke Bryan and Blake Shelton | CBS | MGM Grand Garden Arena, Las Vegas, Nevada |
| 48th | April 7, 2013 | Luke Bryan and Blake Shelton | CBS | MGM Grand Garden Arena, Las Vegas, Nevada |
| 47th | April 1, 2012 | Blake Shelton and Reba McEntire | CBS | MGM Grand Garden Arena, Las Vegas, Nevada |
| 46th | April 3, 2011 | Blake Shelton and Reba McEntire | CBS | MGM Grand Garden Arena, Las Vegas, Nevada |
| 45th | April 18, 2010 | Reba McEntire | CBS | MGM Grand Garden Arena, Las Vegas, Nevada |
| 44th | April 5, 2009 | Reba McEntire | CBS | MGM Grand Garden Arena, Las Vegas, Nevada |
| 43rd | May 18, 2008 | Reba McEntire | CBS | MGM Grand Garden Arena, Las Vegas, Nevada |
| 42nd | May 15, 2007 | Reba McEntire | CBS | MGM Grand Garden Arena, Las Vegas, Nevada |
| 41st | May 23, 2006 | Reba McEntire | CBS | MGM Grand Garden Arena, Las Vegas, Nevada |
| 40th | May 17, 2005 | —N/a | CBS | Michelob Ultra Arena, Las Vegas, Nevada |
| 39th | May 26, 2004 | Reba McEntire | CBS | Michelob Ultra Arena, Las Vegas, Nevada |
| 38th | May 21, 2003 | Reba McEntire | CBS | Michelob Ultra Arena, Las Vegas, Nevada |
| 37th | May 22, 2002 | Reba McEntire | CBS | Universal Amphitheatre, Los Angeles |
| 36th | May 9, 2001 | LeAnn Rimes | CBS | Universal Amphitheatre, Los Angeles |
| 35th | May 3, 2000 | Dolly Parton | CBS | Universal Amphitheatre, Los Angeles |
| 34th | May 5, 1999 | —N/a | CBS | Universal Amphitheatre, Los Angeles |
| 33rd | April 22, 1998 | —N/a | CBS | Universal Amphitheatre, Los Angeles |
| 32nd | April 23, 1997 | Crystal Bernard, Jeff Foxworthy, and George Strait | NBC | Universal Amphitheatre, Los Angeles |
| 31st | April 24, 1996 | Brooks & Dunn and Faith Hill | NBC | Universal Amphitheatre, Los Angeles |
| 30th | May 10, 1995 | Clint Black, Jeff Foxworthy, and Tanya Tucker | NBC | Universal Amphitheatre, Los Angeles |
| 29th | May 3, 1994 | Alan Jackson and Reba McEntire | NBC | Universal Amphitheatre, Los Angeles |
| 28th | May 11, 1993 | Reba McEntire, Randy Owen, and George Strait | NBC | Universal Amphitheatre, Los Angeles |
| 27th | April 29, 1992 | Clint Black, Lorrie Morgan, and Travis Tritt | NBC | Universal Amphitheatre, Los Angeles |
| 26th | April 24, 1991 | Clint Black, Kathy Mattea, and George Strait | NBC | Universal Amphitheatre, Los Angeles |
| 25th | April 25, 1990 | Alabama, The Judds, George Strait, and Tammy Wynette | NBC | Pantages Theatre, Los Angeles, California |
| 24th | April 10, 1989 | Patrick Duffy, K.T. Oslin, and George Strait | NBC | Disney Studios, Burbank, California |
| 23rd | March 21, 1988 | Reba McEntire and Hank Williams, Jr. | NBC | Knott's Berry Farm, Buena Park, California |
| 22nd | April 6, 1987 | Patrick Duffy and The Judds | NBC | Knott's Berry Farm, Buena Park, California |
| 21st | April 14, 1986 | Mac Davis, Reba McEntire, and John Schneider | NBC | Knott's Berry Farm, Buena Park, California |
| 20th | May 6, 1985 | Glen Campbell, Janie Fricke, and Loretta Lynn | NBC | Knott's Berry Farm, Buena Park, California |
| 19th | May 14, 1984 | Mac Davis, Crystal Gayle, and Charley Pride | NBC | Knott's Berry Farm, Buena Park, California |
| 18th | May 9, 1983 | Jerry Reed, John Schneider, and Tammy Wynette | NBC | Knott's Berry Farm, Buena Park, California |
| 17th | April 30, 1982 | Mickey Gilley, Conway Twitty, and Dottie West | NBC | Knott's Berry Farm, Buena Park, California |
| 16th | April 30, 1981 | Larry Gatlin, Don Meredith, and Tammy Wynette | NBC | Shrine Auditorium, Los Angeles, California |
| 15th | May 1, 1980 | Claude Akins, Loretta Lynn, and Charley Pride | NBC | Knott's Berry Farm, Buena Park, California |
| 14th | May 2, 1979 | Roy Clark, Barbara Mandrell, and Dennis Weaver | NBC | The Palladium, Los Angeles, California |
| 13th | April 12, 1978 | Donna Fargo, Barbara Mandrell, and Kenny Rogers | ABC | Shrine Auditorium, Los Angeles, California |
| 12th | February 24, 1977 | Pat Boone, Patti Page, and Jerry Reed | ABC | Shrine Auditorium, Los Angeles, California |
| 11th | February 19, 1976 | Marty Robbins | ABC | The Palladium, Los Angeles, California |
| 10th | March 5, 1975 | Loretta Lynn and Roger Miller | ABC | Knott's Berry Farm, Buena Park, California |
| 9th | March 25, 1974 | Roger Miller and Charlie Rich | ABC | Knott's Berry Farm, Buena Park, California |
| 8th | February 26, 1973 | Dick Clark | ABC | Knott's Berry Farm, Buena Park, California |
| 7th | March 13, 1972 | Dick Clark | ABC | Knott's Berry Farm, Buena Park, California |
| 6th | March 22, 1971 | Dick Clark | —N/a | The Palladium, Los Angeles, California |
| 5th | April 13, 1970 | Buddy Ebsen | —N/a | The Palladium, Los Angeles, California |
| 4th | April 28, 1969 | Dick Clark | —N/a | The Palladium, Los Angeles, California |
| 3rd | March 4, 1968 | Pat Buttram | —N/a | Century Plaza Hotel, Los Angeles, California |
| 2nd | March 6, 1967 | Lorne Greene | —N/a | The Beverly Hilton, Los Angeles, California |
| 1st | Spring 1966 | | —N/a | |

== Awards by year ==
Below is a list of winners in the major categories by year. The year represents nominated work.

=== 1960s ===
- 1966

| Top Male Vocalist: | Buck Owens |
| Top Female Vocalist: | Bonnie Owens |
| Top Vocal Duo: | Merle Haggard and Bonnie Owens |
| Top New Male Vocalist: | Merle Haggard |
| Top New Female Vocalist: | Kay Adams |
| Band of the Year: | The Buckaroos |

- 1967

| Top Male Vocalist: | Merle Haggard |
| Female Vocalist of the year: | Bonnie Guitar |
| New Male Vocalist of the year: | Billy Mize |
| New Female Vocalist of the year: | Cathie Taylor |
| Band of the Year: | The Buckaroos |
| Song of the Year: | "Apartment No. 9" - Johnny Paycheck, Fern Foley, "Fuzzy" Owens |

- 1968

| Album of the Year: | Gentle on My Mind – Glen Campbell |
| Top Male Vocalist: | Glen Campbell |
| Top Female Vocalist: | Lynn Anderson |
| Top Vocal Duo: | Merle Haggard and Bonnie Owens |
| Top Vocal Group: | Sons of the Pioneers |
| Top New Male Vocalist: | Jerry Inman |
| Top New Female Vocalist: | Bobbie Gentry |
| Band of the Year: | The Buckaroos |

- 1969

| Single of the Year: | "Little Green Apples" – Roger Miller |
| Album of the Year: | Bobbie Gentry & Glen Campbell – Bobbie Gentry and Glen Campbell |
| Top Male Vocalist: | Glen Campbell |
| Top Female Vocalist: | Cathie Taylor |
| Top Vocal Duo: | Johnny Mosby and Jonie Mosby |
| Top New Male Vocalist: | Ray Sanders |
| Top New Female Vocalist: | Cheryl Poole |
| Band of the Year: | The Buckaroos |

=== 1970s ===
- 1970

| Artist of the Decade: | Marty Robbins |
| Single of the Year: | "Okie from Muskogee" – Merle Haggard |
| Album of the Year: | Okie from Muskogee – Merle Haggard |
| Top Male Vocalist: | Merle Haggard |
| Top Female Vocalist: | Tammy Wynette |
| Top Vocal Duo: | Merle Haggard and Bonnie Owens |
| Top Vocal Group: | The Kimberleys |
| Top New Male Vocalist: | Freddy Weller |
| Top New Female Vocalist: | Donna Fargo |

- 1971

| Entertainer of the Year: | Merle Haggard |
| Song of the Year: | "For the Good Times" – Ray Price – Kris Kristofferson |
| Single of the Year: | "For the Good Times" – Ray Price |
| Album of the Year: | For the Good Times – Ray Price |
| Top Male Vocalist: | Merle Haggard |
| Top Female Vocalist: | Lynn Anderson |
| Top Vocal Group: | The Kimberleys |
| Top New Male Vocalist: | Buddy Alan |
| Top New Female Vocalist: | Sammi Smith |

- 1972

| Entertainer of the Year: | Freddie Hart |
| Song of the Year: | "Easy Loving" – Freddie Hart – Freddie Hart |
| Single of the Year: | "Easy Loving" – Freddie Hart |
| Album of the Year: | Easy Loving – Freddie Hart |
| Top Male Vocalist: | Freddie Hart |
| Top Female Vocalist: | Loretta Lynn |
| Top Vocal Duo: | Conway Twitty and Loretta Lynn |
| Top New Male Vocalist: | Tony Booth |
| Top New Female Vocalist: | Barbara Mandrell |

- 1973

| Entertainer of the Year: | Roy Clark |
| Song of the Year: | "The Happiest Girl in the Whole U.S.A." – Donna Fargo – Donna Fargo |
| Single of the Year: | "The Happiest Girl in the Whole U.S.A." – Donna Fargo |
| Album of the Year: | The Happiest Girl in the Whole U.S.A. – Donna Fargo |
| Top Male Vocalist: | Merle Haggard |
| Top Female Vocalist: | Donna Fargo |
| Top Vocal Group: | The Statler Brothers |
| Top New Male Vocalist: | Johnny Rodriguez |
| Top New Female Vocalist: | Tanya Tucker |

- 1974

| Entertainer of the Year: | Roy Clark |
| Song of the Year: | "Behind Closed Doors" – Charlie Rich – Kenny O'Dell |
| Single of the Year: | "Behind Closed Doors" – Charlie Rich |
| Album of the Year: | Behind Closed Doors – Charlie Rich |
| Top Male Vocalist: | Charlie Rich |
| Top Female Vocalist: | Loretta Lynn |
| Top Vocal Group: | Brush Arbor |
| Top New Male Vocalist: | Dorsey Burnette |
| Top New Female Vocalist: | Olivia Newton-John |

- 1975

| Entertainer of the Year: | Mac Davis |
| Song of the Year: | "Country Bumpkin" – Cal Smith – Don Wayne |
| Single of the Year: | "Country Bumpkin" – Cal Smith |
| Album of the Year: | Back Home Again – John Denver |
| Top Male Vocalist: | Merle Haggard |
| Top Female Vocalist: | Loretta Lynn |
| Top Vocal Duo: | Conway Twitty and Loretta Lynn |
| Top New Male Vocalist: | Mickey Gilley |
| Top New Female Vocalist: | Linda Ronstadt |

- 1976

| Entertainer of the Year: | Loretta Lynn |
| Song of the Year: | "Rhinestone Cowboy" – Glen Campbell – Larry Weiss |
| Single of the Year: | "Rhinestone Cowboy" – Glen Campbell |
| Album of the Year: | Feelin's – Loretta Lynn and Conway Twitty |
| Top Male Vocalist: | Conway Twitty |
| Top Female Vocalist: | Loretta Lynn |
| Top Vocal Duo: | Conway Twitty and Loretta Lynn |
| Top New Male Vocalist: | Freddy Fender |
| Top New Female Vocalist: | Crystal Gayle |

- 1977

| Entertainer of the Year: | Mickey Gilley |
| Song of the Year: | "Don't the Girls All Get Prettier at Closing Time" – Mickey Gilley – Baker Knight |
| Single of the Year: | "Bring It On Home to Me" – Mickey Gilley |
| Album of the Year: | Gilley's Smoking – Mickey Gilley |
| Top Male Vocalist: | Mickey Gilley |
| Top Female Vocalist: | Crystal Gayle |
| Top Vocal Duo: | Conway Twitty and Loretta Lynn |
| Top New Male Vocalist: | Moe Bandy |
| Top New Female Vocalist: | Billie Jo Spears |

- 1978

| Entertainer of the Year: | Dolly Parton |
| Song of the Year: | "Lucille" – Kenny Rogers – Roger Bowling, Hal Bynum |
| Single of the Year: | "Lucille" – Kenny Rogers |
| Album of the Year: | Kenny Rogers – Kenny Rogers |
| Top Male Vocalist: | Kenny Rogers |
| Top Female Vocalist: | Crystal Gayle |
| Top Vocal Group: | The Statler Brothers |
| Top New Male Vocalist: | Eddie Rabbitt |
| Top New Female Vocalist: | Debby Boone |

- 1979

| Entertainer of the Year: | Kenny Rogers |
| Song of the Year: | "You Needed Me" – Anne Murray – Randy Goodrum |
| Single of the Year: | "Tulsa Time" – Don Williams |
| Album of the Year: | Y'all Come Back Saloon – The Oak Ridge Boys |
| Top Male Vocalist: | Kenny Rogers |
| Top Female Vocalist: | Barbara Mandrell |
| Top Vocal Group: | The Oak Ridge Boys |
| Top New Male Vocalist: | John Conlee |
| Top New Female Vocalist: | Cristy Lane |

=== 1980s ===
- 1980

| Artist of the Decade: | Loretta Lynn |
| Entertainer of the Year: | Willie Nelson |
| Song of the Year: | "It's a Cheating Situation" – Moe Bandy – Sonny Throckmorton, Curly Putman |
| Single of the Year: | "All the Gold in California" – Larry Gatlin |
| Album of the Year: | Straight Ahead – Larry Gatlin |
| Top Male Vocalist: | Larry Gatlin |
| Top Female Vocalist: | Crystal Gayle |
| Top Vocal Duo: | Joe Stampley and Moe Bandy |
| Top New Male Vocalist: | R. C. Bannon |
| Top New Female Vocalist: | Lacy J. Dalton |

- 1981

| Entertainer of the Year: | Barbara Mandrell |
| Song of the Year: | "He Stopped Loving Her Today" – George Jones – Bobby Braddock, Curly Putman |
| Single of the Year: | "He Stopped Loving Her Today" – George Jones |
| Album of the Year: | Urban Cowboy – Soundtrack |
| Top Male Vocalist: | George Jones |
| Top Female Vocalist: | Dolly Parton |
| Top New Male Vocalist: | Johnny Lee |
| Top New Female Vocalist: | Terri Gibbs |

- 1982

| Entertainer of the Year: | Alabama |
| Song of the Year: | "You're the Reason God Made Oklahoma" – David Frizzell and Shelly West – Felice Bryant, Boudleaux Bryant, Larry Collins, Sandy Pinkard |
| Single of the Year: | "Elvira" – The Oak Ridge Boys |
| Album of the Year: | Feels So Right – Alabama |
| Top Male Vocalist: | Merle Haggard |
| Top Female Vocalist: | Barbara Mandrell |
| Top Vocal Duo: | Shelly West and David Frizzell |
| Top New Male Vocalist: | Ricky Skaggs |
| Top New Female Vocalist: | Juice Newton |

- 1983

| Entertainer of the Year: | Alabama |
| Song of the Year: | "Are the Good Times Really Over (I Wish a Buck Was Still Silver)" – Merle Haggard – Merle Haggard |
| Single of the Year: | "Always on My Mind" – Willie Nelson |
| Album of the Year: | Always on My Mind – Willie Nelson |
| Top Male Vocalist: | Ronnie Milsap |
| Top Female Vocalist: | Sylvia |
| Top Vocal Duo: | Shelly West and David Frizzell |
| Top Vocal Group: | Alabama |
| Top New Male Vocalist: | Michael Martin Murphey |
| Top New Female Vocalist: | Karen Brooks |

- 1984

| Entertainer of the Year: | Alabama |
| Song of the Year: | "Wind Beneath My Wings" – Gary Morris – Larry Henley, Jeff Silbar |
| Single of the Year: | "Islands in the Stream" – Kenny Rogers and Dolly Parton |
| Album of the Year: | The Closer You Get… – Alabama |
| Top Male Vocalist: | Lee Greenwood |
| Top Female Vocalist: | Janie Fricke |
| Top Vocal Duo: | Dolly Parton and Kenny Rogers |
| Top Vocal Group: | Alabama |
| Top New Male Vocalist: | Jim Glaser |
| Top New Female Vocalist: | Gus Hardin |

- 1985

| Entertainer of the Year: | Alabama |
| Song of the Year: | "Why Not Me" – The Judds – Harlan Howard, Brent Maher, Sonny Throckmorton |
| Single of the Year: | "To All the Girls I've Loved Before" – Willie Nelson and Julio Iglesias |
| Album of the Year: | Roll On – Alabama |
| Top Male Vocalist: | George Strait |
| Top Female Vocalist: | Reba McEntire |
| Top Vocal Duo: | The Judds |
| Top Vocal Group: | Alabama |
| Top New Male Vocalist: | Vince Gill |
| Top New Female Vocalist: | Nicolette Larson |
| Video of the Year: | "All My Rowdy Friends Are Coming Over Tonight" – Hank Williams, Jr. |

- 1986

| Entertainer of the Year: | Alabama |
| Song of the Year: | "Lost in the Fifties Tonight" – Ronnie Milsap – Fred Parris, Mike Reid, Troy Seals |
| Single of the Year: | "Highwayman" – The Highwaymen |
| Album of the Year: | Does Fort Worth Ever Cross Your Mind – George Strait |
| Top Male Vocalist: | George Strait |
| Top Female Vocalist: | Reba McEntire |
| Top Vocal Duo: | The Judds |
| Top Vocal Group: | Alabama |
| Top New Male Vocalist: | Randy Travis |
| Top New Female Vocalist: | Judy Rodman |
| Video of the Year: | "Who's Gonna Fill Their Shoes" – George Jones |

- 1987

| Entertainer of the Year: | Hank Williams, Jr. |
| Song of the Year: | "On the Other Hand" – Randy Travis – Paul Overstreet, Don Schlitz |
| Single of the Year: | "On the Other Hand" – Randy Travis |
| Album of the Year: | Storms of Life – Randy Travis |
| Top Male Vocalist: | Randy Travis |
| Top Female Vocalist: | Reba McEntire |
| Top Vocal Duo: | The Judds |
| Top Vocal Group: | The Forester Sisters |
| Top New Male Vocalist: | Dwight Yoakam |
| Top New Female Vocalist: | Holly Dunn |
| Video of the Year: | "Whoever's in New England" – Reba McEntire |

- 1988

| Entertainer of the Year: | Hank Williams, Jr. |
| Song of the Year: | "Forever and Ever, Amen" – Randy Travis – Paul Overstreet, Don Schlitz |
| Single of the Year: | "Forever and Ever, Amen" – Randy Travis |
| Album of the Year: | Trio – Dolly Parton, Linda Ronstadt and Emmylou Harris |
| Top Male Vocalist: | Randy Travis |
| Top Female Vocalist: | Reba McEntire |
| Top Vocal Duo: | The Judds |
| Top Vocal Group: | Highway 101 |
| Top New Male Vocalist: | Ricky Van Shelton |
| Top New Female Vocalist: | K. T. Oslin |
| Video of the Year: | "80's Ladies" – K. T. Oslin |

- 1989

| Entertainer of the Year: | Hank Williams, Jr. |
| Song of the Year: | "Eighteen Wheels and a Dozen Roses" – Kathy Mattea – Gene Nelson, Paul Nelson |
| Single of the Year: | "Eighteen Wheels and a Dozen Roses" – Kathy Mattea |
| Album of the Year: | This Woman – K. T. Oslin |
| Top Male Vocalist: | George Strait |
| Top Female Vocalist: | K. T. Oslin |
| Top Vocal Duo: | The Judds |
| Top Vocal Group: | Highway 101 |
| Top New Male Vocalist: | Rodney Crowell |
| Top New Female Vocalist: | Suzy Bogguss |
| Video of the Year: | "Young Country" – Hank Williams, Jr. |

=== 1990s ===
- 1990

| Artist of the Decade: | Alabama |
| Entertainer of the Year: | George Strait |
| Song of the Year: | "Where've You Been" – Kathy Mattea – Jon Vezner, Don Henry |
| Single of the Year: | "A Better Man" – Clint Black |
| Album of the Year: | Killin' Time – Clint Black |
| Top Male Vocalist: | Clint Black |
| Top Female Vocalist: | Kathy Mattea |
| Top Vocal Duo: | The Judds |
| Top Vocal Group: | Restless Heart |
| Top New Male Vocalist: | Clint Black |
| Top New Female Vocalist: | Mary Chapin Carpenter |
| Top New Vocal Duo or Group: | The Kentucky Headhunters |
| Video of the Year: | "There's a Tear in My Beer" – Hank Williams, Jr. and Hank Williams |

- 1991

| Entertainer of the Year: | Garth Brooks |
| Song of the Year: | "The Dance" – Garth Brooks – Tony Arata |
| Single of the Year: | "Friends in Low Places" – Garth Brooks |
| Album of the Year: | No Fences – Garth Brooks |
| Top Male Vocalist: | Garth Brooks |
| Top Female Vocalist: | Reba McEntire |
| Top Vocal Duo: | The Judds |
| Top Vocal Group: | Shenandoah |
| Top New Male Vocalist: | Alan Jackson |
| Top New Female Vocalist: | Shelby Lynne |
| Top New Vocal Duo or Group: | Pirates of the Mississippi |
| Video of the Year: | "The Dance" – Garth Brooks |

- 1992

| Entertainer of the Year: | Garth Brooks |
| Song of the Year: | "Somewhere in My Broken Heart" – Billy Dean – Billy Dean, Richard Leigh |
| Single of the Year: | "Don't Rock the Jukebox" – Alan Jackson |
| Album of the Year: | Don't Rock the Jukebox – Alan Jackson |
| Top Male Vocalist: | Garth Brooks |
| Top Female Vocalist: | Reba McEntire |
| Top Vocal Duo: | Brooks & Dunn |
| Top Vocal Group: | Diamond Rio |
| Top New Male Vocalist: | Billy Dean |
| Top New Female Vocalist: | Trisha Yearwood |
| Top New Vocal Duo or Group: | Brooks & Dunn |
| Video of the Year: | "Is There Life Out There" – Reba McEntire |

- 1993

| Entertainer of the Year: | Garth Brooks |
| Song of the Year: | "I Still Believe in You" – Vince Gill – Vince Gill, John Barlow Jarvis |
| Single of the Year: | "Boot Scootin' Boogie" – Brooks & Dunn |
| Album of the Year: | Brand New Man – Brooks & Dunn |
| Top Male Vocalist: | Vince Gill |
| Top Female Vocalist: | Mary Chapin Carpenter |
| Top Vocal Duo: | Brooks & Dunn |
| Top Vocal Group: | Diamond Rio |
| Top New Male Vocalist: | Tracy Lawrence |
| Top New Female Vocalist: | Michelle Wright |
| Top New Vocal Duo or Group: | Confederate Railroad |
| Video of the Year: | "Two Sparrows in a Hurricane" – Tanya Tucker |

- 1994

| Entertainer of the Year: | Garth Brooks |
| Song of the Year: | "I Love the Way You Love Me" – John Michael Montgomery – Victoria Shaw, Chuck Cannon |
| Single of the Year: | "Chattahoochee" – Alan Jackson |
| Album of the Year: | A Lot About Livin' (And a Little 'bout Love) – Alan Jackson |
| Top Male Vocalist: | Vince Gill |
| Top Female Vocalist: | Wynonna |
| Top Vocal Duo: | Brooks & Dunn |
| Top Vocal Group: | Little Texas |
| Top New Male Vocalist: | John Michael Montgomery |
| Top New Female Vocalist: | Faith Hill |
| Top New Vocal Duo or Group: | Gibson/Miller Band |
| Video of the Year: | "We Shall Be Free" – Garth Brooks |

- 1995

| Entertainer of the Year: | Reba McEntire |
| Song of the Year: | "I Swear" – John Michael Montgomery – Gary Baker, Frank J. Myers |
| Single of the Year: | "I Swear" – John Michael Montgomery |
| Album of the Year: | Not a Moment Too Soon – Tim McGraw |
| Top Male Vocalist: | Alan Jackson |
| Top Female Vocalist: | Reba McEntire |
| Top Vocal Duo: | Brooks & Dunn |
| Top Vocal Group: | The Mavericks |
| Top New Male Vocalist: | Tim McGraw |
| Top New Female Vocalist: | Chely Wright |
| Top New Vocal Duo or Group: | The Mavericks |
| Video of the Year: | "The Red Strokes" – Garth Brooks |

- 1996

| Entertainer of the Year: | Brooks & Dunn |
| Song of the Year: | "The Keeper of the Stars" – Tracy Byrd – Dickey Lee, Karen Staley, Danny Mayo |
| Single of the Year: | "Check Yes or No" – George Strait |
| Album of the Year: | The Woman in Me – Shania Twain |
| Top Male Vocalist: | Alan Jackson |
| Top Female Vocalist: | Patty Loveless |
| Top Vocal Duo: | Brooks & Dunn |
| Top Vocal Group: | The Mavericks |
| Top New Male Vocalist: | Bryan White |
| Top New Female Vocalist: | Shania Twain |
| Top New Vocal Duo or Group: | Lonestar |
| Video of the Year: | "The Car" – Jeff Carson |

- 1997

| Entertainer of the Year: | Brooks & Dunn |
| Song of the Year: | "Blue" – LeAnn Rimes – Bill Mack |
| Single of the Year: | Blue – LeAnn Rimes |
| Album of the Year: | Blue Clear Sky – George Strait |
| Top Male Vocalist: | George Strait |
| Top Female Vocalist: | Patty Loveless |
| Top Vocal Duo: | Brooks & Dunn |
| Top Vocal Group: | Sawyer Brown |
| Top New Male Vocalist: | Trace Adkins |
| Top New Female Vocalist: | LeAnn Rimes |
| Top New Vocal Duo or Group: | Ricochet |
| Video of the Year: | "I Think About You" – Collin Raye |

- 1998

| Entertainer of the Year: | Garth Brooks |
| Song of the Year: | "It's Your Love" – Tim McGraw and Faith Hill – Stephony Smith |
| Single of the Year: | "It's Your Love" – Tim McGraw and Faith Hill |
| Album of the Year: | Carrying Your Love with Me – George Strait |
| Top Male Vocalist: | George Strait |
| Top Female Vocalist: | Trisha Yearwood |
| Top Vocal Duo or Group: | Brooks & Dunn |
| Top New Male Vocalist: | Kenny Chesney |
| Top New Female Vocalist: | Lee Ann Womack |
| Top New Vocal Duo or Group: | The Kinleys |
| Video of the Year: | "It's Your Love" – Tim McGraw and Faith Hill |
| Vocal Event of the Year: | "It's Your Love" – Tim McGraw and Faith Hill |

- 1999

| Entertainer of the Year: | Garth Brooks |
| Song of the Year: | "Holes in the Floor of Heaven" – Steve Wariner – Steve Wariner, Billy Kirsch |
| Single of the Year: | "This Kiss" – Faith Hill |
| Album of the Year: | Wide Open Spaces – Dixie Chicks |
| Top Male Vocalist: | Tim McGraw |
| Top Female Vocalist: | Faith Hill |
| Top Vocal Duo or Group: | Dixie Chicks |
| Top New Male Vocalist: | Mark Wills |
| Top New Female Vocalist: | Jo Dee Messina |
| Top New Vocal Duo or Group: | Dixie Chicks |
| Video of the Year: | "This Kiss" – Faith Hill |
| Vocal Event of the Year: | "Just to Hear You Say That You Love Me" – Faith Hill and Tim McGraw |

=== 2000s ===
- 2000

| Host: | Dolly Parton |
| Artist of the Decade: | Garth Brooks |
| Entertainer of the Year: | Shania Twain |
| Song of the Year: | "Amazed" – Lonestar – Marv Green, Aimee Mayo |
| Single of the Year: | "Amazed" – Lonestar |
| Album of the Year: | Fly – Dixie Chicks |
| Top Male Vocalist: | Tim McGraw |
| Top Female Vocalist: | Faith Hill |
| Top Vocal Duo or Group: | Dixie Chicks |
| Top New Male Vocalist: | Brad Paisley |
| Top New Female Vocalist: | Jessica Andrews |
| Top New Vocal Duo or Group: | Montgomery Gentry |
| Video of the Year: | "Breathe" – Faith Hill |
| Vocal Event of the Year: | "When I Said I Do" – Clint Black and Lisa Hartman Black |

- 2001

| Host: | LeAnn Rimes |
| Entertainer of the Year: | Dixie Chicks |
| Song of the Year: | "I Hope You Dance" – Lee Ann Womack and Sons of the Desert – Mark D. Sanders, Tia Sillers |
| Single of the Year: | "I Hope You Dance" – Lee Ann Womack and Sons of the Desert |
| Album of the Year: | How Do You Like Me Now?! – Toby Keith |
| Top Male Vocalist: | Toby Keith |
| Top Female Vocalist: | Faith Hill |
| Top Vocal Duo: | Brooks & Dunn |
| Top Vocal Group: | Dixie Chicks |
| Top New Male Vocalist: | Keith Urban |
| Top New Female Vocalist: | Jamie O'Neal |
| Top New Vocal Duo or Group: | Rascal Flatts |
| Video of the Year: | "Goodbye Earl" – Dixie Chicks |
| Vocal Event of the Year: | "I Hope You Dance" – Lee Ann Womack and Sons of the Desert |

- 2002

| Host: | Reba McEntire |
| Entertainer of the Year: | Brooks & Dunn |
| Song of the Year: | "Where Were You (When the World Stopped Turning)" – Alan Jackson – Alan Jackson |
| Single of the Year: | "Where Were You (When the World Stopped Turning)" – Alan Jackson |
| Album of the Year: | O Brother, Where Art Thou? – Various Artists |
| Top Male Vocalist: | Alan Jackson |
| Top Female Vocalist: | Martina McBride |
| Top Vocal Duo: | Brooks & Dunn |
| Top Vocal Group: | Lonestar |
| Top New Male Vocalist: | Phil Vassar |
| Top New Female Vocalist: | Carolyn Dawn Johnson |
| Top New Vocal Duo or Group: | Trick Pony |
| Video of the Year: | "Only in America" – Brooks & Dunn |
| Vocal Event of the Year: | "I Am a Man of Constant Sorrow" – The Soggy Bottom Boys |
| Humanitarian Award: | Reba McEntire |

- 2003

| Host: | Reba McEntire |
| Entertainer of the Year: | Toby Keith |
| Song of the Year: | "I'm Movin' On" – Rascal Flatts – Phillip Brian White, David Vincent Williams |
| Single of the Year: | "The Good Stuff" – Kenny Chesney |
| Album of the Year: | Drive – Alan Jackson |
| Top Male Vocalist: | Kenny Chesney |
| Top Female Vocalist: | Martina McBride |
| Top Vocal Duo: | Brooks & Dunn |
| Top Vocal Group: | Rascal Flatts |
| Top New Male Vocalist: | Joe Nichols |
| Top New Female Vocalist: | Kellie Coffey |
| Top New Vocal Duo or Group: | Emerson Drive |
| Video of the Year: | "Drive (For Daddy Gene)" – Alan Jackson |
| Vocal Event of the Year: | "Mendocino County Line" – Willie Nelson and Lee Ann Womack |
| Humanitarian Award: | Lonestar |

- 2004

| Entertainer of the Year: | Toby Keith |
| Song of the Year: | "Three Wooden Crosses" – Randy Travis – Doug Johnson, Kim Williams |
| Single of the Year: | "It's Five O'Clock Somewhere" – Alan Jackson and Jimmy Buffett |
| Album of the Year: | Shock'n Y'all – Toby Keith |
| Top Male Vocalist: | Toby Keith |
| Top Female Vocalist: | Martina McBride |
| Top Vocal Duo: | Brooks & Dunn |
| Top Vocal Group: | Rascal Flatts |
| Top New Artist: | Dierks Bentley |
| Video of the Year: | "Beer for My Horses" – Toby Keith and Willie Nelson |
| Vocal Event of the Year: | "It's Five O'Clock Somewhere" – Alan Jackson and Jimmy Buffett |
| Humanitarian Award: | Martina McBride |

- 2005

| Host: | Reba McEntire |
| Entertainer of the Year: | Kenny Chesney |
| Song of the Year: | "Live Like You Were Dying" – Tim McGraw – Craig Wiseman, Tim Nichols |
| Single of the Year: | "Live Like You Were Dying" – Tim McGraw |
| Album of the Year: | Be Here – Keith Urban |
| Top Male Vocalist: | Keith Urban |
| Top Female Vocalist: | Gretchen Wilson |
| Top Vocal Duo: | Brooks & Dunn |
| Top Vocal Group: | Rascal Flatts |
| Top New Artist: | Gretchen Wilson |
| Video of the Year: | "Whiskey Lullaby" – Brad Paisley and Alison Krauss |
| Vocal Event of the Year: | "Whiskey Lullaby" – Brad Paisley and Alison Krauss |
| Humanitarian Award: | Neal McCoy |

- 2006

| Host: | Reba McEntire |
| Entertainer of the Year: | Kenny Chesney |
| Song of the Year: | "Believe" – Brooks & Dunn – Craig Wiseman, Ronnie Dunn |
| Single of the Year: | "Jesus, Take the Wheel" – Carrie Underwood |
| Album of the Year: | Time Well Wasted – Brad Paisley |
| Top Male Vocalist: | Keith Urban |
| Top Female Vocalist: | Sara Evans |
| Top Vocal Duo: | Brooks & Dunn |
| Top Vocal Group: | Rascal Flatts |
| Top New Male Vocalist: | Jason Aldean |
| Top New Female Vocalist: | Carrie Underwood |
| Top New Duo or Vocal Group: | Sugarland |
| Video of the Year: | "When I Get Where I'm Going" – Brad Paisley and Dolly Parton |
| Vocal Event of the Year: | "When I Get Where I'm Going" – Brad Paisley and Dolly Parton |
| Humanitarian Award: | Vince Gill |

- 2007

| Host: | Reba McEntire |
| Entertainer of the Year: | Kenny Chesney |
| Song of the Year: | "Give It Away" – George Strait – Bill Anderson, Buddy Cannon, Jamey Johnson |
| Single of the Year: | "Give It Away" – George Strait |
| Album of the Year: | Some Hearts – Carrie Underwood |
| Top Male Vocalist: | Brad Paisley |
| Top Female Vocalist: | Carrie Underwood |
| Top Vocal Duo: | Brooks & Dunn |
| Top Vocal Group: | Rascal Flatts |
| Top New Male Vocalist: | Rodney Atkins |
| Top New Female Vocalist: | Miranda Lambert |
| Top New Duo or Vocal Group: | Little Big Town |
| Video of the Year: | "Before He Cheats" – Carrie Underwood |
| Vocal Event of the Year: | "Building Bridges" – Brooks & Dunn, Vince Gill and Sheryl Crow |
| Humanitarian Award: | Brooks & Dunn |

- 2008

| Host: | Reba McEntire |
| Entertainer of the Year: | Kenny Chesney |
| Song of the Year: | "Stay" – Sugarland – Jennifer Nettles |
| Single of the Year: | "Stay" – Sugarland |
| Album of the Year: | Crazy Ex-Girlfriend – Miranda Lambert |
| Top Male Vocalist: | Brad Paisley |
| Top Female Vocalist: | Carrie Underwood |
| Top Vocal Duo: | Brooks & Dunn |
| Top Vocal Group: | Rascal Flatts |
| Top New Male Vocalist: | Jack Ingram |
| Top New Female Vocalist: | Taylor Swift |
| Top New Duo or Vocal Group: | Lady Antebellum |
| Video of the Year: | "Online" – Brad Paisley |
| Vocal Event of the Year: | "Find Out Who Your Friends Are" – Tracy Lawrence, Tim McGraw and Kenny Chesney |
| Humanitarian Award: | Rascal Flatts |
| Crystal Milestone Award: | Garth Brooks |

- 2009

| Host: | Reba McEntire |
| Artist of the Decade: | George Strait |
| Entertainer of the Year: | Carrie Underwood |
| Song of the Year: | "In Color" – Jamey Johnson – Jamey Johnson, Lee Thomas Miller, James Otto |
| Single of the Year: | "You're Gonna Miss This" – Trace Adkins |
| Album of the Year: | Fearless – Taylor Swift |
| Top Male Vocalist: | Brad Paisley |
| Top Female Vocalist: | Carrie Underwood |
| Top Vocal Duo: | Sugarland |
| Top Vocal Group: | Rascal Flatts |
| Top New Artist: | Julianne Hough |
| Top New Male Vocalist: | Jake Owen |
| Top New Female Vocalist: | Julianne Hough |
| Top New Duo or Vocal Group: | Zac Brown Band |
| Video of the Year: | "Waitin' on a Woman" – Brad Paisley |
| Vocal Event of the Year: | "Start a Band" – Brad Paisley and Keith Urban |
| Humanitarian Award: | LeAnn Rimes |
| Crystal Milestone Award: | Taylor Swift, Jennifer Nettles |

=== 2010s ===
- 2010

| Host: | Reba McEntire |
| Entertainer of the Year: | Carrie Underwood |
| Song of the Year: | "Need You Now" – Lady Antebellum – Dave Haywood, Josh Kear, Charles Kelley, Hillary Scott |
| Single Record of the Year: | "Need You Now" – Lady Antebellum |
| Album of the Year: | Revolution – Miranda Lambert |
| Top Male Vocalist: | Brad Paisley |
| Top Female Vocalist: | Miranda Lambert |
| Top Vocal Duo: | Brooks & Dunn |
| Top Vocal Group: | Lady Antebellum |
| Top New Artist: | Luke Bryan |
| Top New Solo Vocalist: | Luke Bryan |
| Top New Vocal Duo: | Joey + Rory |
| Top New Vocal Group: | Gloriana |
| Video of the Year: | "White Liar" – Miranda Lambert |
| Vocal Event of the Year: | "Hillbilly Bone" – Blake Shelton and Trace Adkins |
| Triple-Crown Award (special honor): | Carrie Underwood |
| Humanitarian Award (special honor): | Montgomery Gentry |

- 2011

| Host: | Blake Shelton and Reba McEntire |
| Entertainer of the Year: | Taylor Swift |
| Song of the Year: | "The House That Built Me" – Miranda Lambert – Tom Douglas, Allen Shamblin |
| Single Record of the Year: | "The House That Built Me" – Miranda Lambert |
| Album of the Year: | Need You Now – Lady Antebellum |
| Top Male Vocalist: | Brad Paisley |
| Top Female Vocalist: | Miranda Lambert |
| Top Vocal Duo: | Sugarland |
| Top Vocal Group: | Lady Antebellum |
| Top New Artist: | The Band Perry |
| Top New Solo Artist: | Eric Church |
| Top New Duo/Group: | The Band Perry |
| Video of the Year: | "The House That Built Me" – Miranda Lambert |
| Vocal Event of the Year: | "As She's Walking Away" – Zac Brown Band and Alan Jackson |

- 2012

| Host: | Blake Shelton and Reba McEntire |
| Entertainer of the Year: | Taylor Swift |
| Song of the Year: | "Crazy Girl" – Eli Young Band – Lee Brice, Liz Rose |
| Single Record of the Year: | "Don't You Wanna Stay" – Jason Aldean and Kelly Clarkson |
| Album of the Year: | Four the Record – Miranda Lambert |
| Top Male Vocalist: | Blake Shelton |
| Top Female Vocalist: | Miranda Lambert |
| Top Vocal Duo: | Thompson Square |
| Top Vocal Group: | Lady Antebellum |
| Top New Artist: | Scotty McCreery |
| Video of the Year: | "Red Solo Cup" – Toby Keith |
| Vocal Event of the Year: | "Don't You Wanna Stay" – Jason Aldean and Kelly Clarkson |

- 2013

| Host: | Luke Bryan and Blake Shelton |
| Entertainer of the Year: | Luke Bryan |
| Song of the Year: | "Over You" – Miranda Lambert – Miranda Lambert, Blake Shelton |
| Single Record of the Year: | "Over You" – Miranda Lambert |
| Album of the Year: | Chief – Eric Church |
| Male Vocalist of the Year: | Jason Aldean |
| Female Vocalist of the Year: | Miranda Lambert |
| Vocal Duo of the Year: | Thompson Square |
| Vocal Group of the Year: | Little Big Town |
| New Artist of the Year: | Florida Georgia Line |
| New Male Vocalist of the Year: | Brantley Gilbert |
| New Female Vocalist of the Year: | Jana Kramer |
| New Duo/Group of the Year: | Florida Georgia Line |
| Video of the Year: | "Tornado" – Little Big Town |
| Vocal Event of the Year: | "The Only Way I Know" – Jason Aldean, Luke Bryan and Eric Church |

- 2014

| Host: | Luke Bryan and Blake Shelton |
| Entertainer of the Year: | George Strait |
| Song of the Year: | "I Drive Your Truck" – Lee Brice – Jessi Alexander, Connie Harrington, Jimmy Yeary |
| Single Record of the Year: | "Mama's Broken Heart" – Miranda Lambert |
| Album of the Year: | Same Trailer Different Park – Kacey Musgraves |
| Male Vocalist of the Year: | Jason Aldean |
| Female Vocalist of the Year: | Miranda Lambert |
| Vocal Duo of the Year: | Florida Georgia Line |
| Vocal Group of the Year: | The Band Perry |
| New Artist of the Year: | Justin Moore |
| Video of the Year: | "Highway Don't Care" – Tim McGraw feat. Taylor Swift and Keith Urban |
| Vocal Event of the Year: | "We Were Us" – Keith Urban feat. Miranda Lambert |

- 2015

| Host: | Luke Bryan and Blake Shelton |
| Entertainer of the Year: | Luke Bryan |
| Song of the Year: | "Automatic" – Miranda Lambert – Nicolle Galyon, Natalie Hemby, Miranda Lambert |
| Single Record of the Year: | "I Don't Dance" – Lee Brice |
| Album of the Year: | Platinum – Miranda Lambert |
| Male Vocalist of the Year: | Jason Aldean |
| Female Vocalist of the Year: | Miranda Lambert |
| Vocal Duo of the Year: | Florida Georgia Line |
| Vocal Group of the Year: | Little Big Town |
| New Artist of the Year: | Cole Swindell |
| Video of the Year: | "Drunk on a Plane" – Dierks Bentley |
| Vocal Event of the Year: | "This Is How We Roll" – Florida Georgia Line feat. Luke Bryan |

- 2016

| Host: | Luke Bryan and Dierks Bentley |
| Entertainer of the Year: | Jason Aldean |
| Song of the Year: | "Nobody to Blame" – Chris Stapleton – Barry Bales, Ronnie Bowman, Chris Stapleton |
| Single Record of the Year: | "Die a Happy Man" – Thomas Rhett |
| Album of the Year: | Traveller – Chris Stapleton |
| Male Vocalist of the Year: | Chris Stapleton |
| Female Vocalist of the Year: | Miranda Lambert |
| Vocal Duo of the Year: | Florida Georgia Line |
| Vocal Group of the Year: | Little Big Town |
| New Male Vocalist of the Year: | Chris Stapleton |
| New Female Vocalist of the Year: | Kelsea Ballerini |
| New Vocal Duo or Group of the Year: | Old Dominion |
| Video of the Year: | "Mr. Misunderstood" – Eric Church |
| Vocal Event of the Year: | "Smokin' and Drinkin'" – Miranda Lambert feat. Little Big Town |

- 2017

| Host: | Luke Bryan and Dierks Bentley |
| Entertainer of the Year: | Jason Aldean |
| Song of the Year: | "Die a Happy Man" – Thomas Rhett – Thomas Rhett, Sean Douglas, Joe Spargur |
| Single Record of the Year: | "H.O.L.Y." – Florida Georgia Line |
| Album of the Year: | The Weight of These Wings – Miranda Lambert |
| Male Vocalist of the Year: | Thomas Rhett |
| Female Vocalist of the Year: | Miranda Lambert |
| Vocal Duo of the Year: | Brothers Osborne |
| Vocal Group of the Year: | Little Big Town |
| New Male Vocalist of the Year: | Jon Pardi |
| New Female Vocalist of the Year: | Maren Morris |
| New Vocal Duo or Group of the Year: | Brothers Osborne |
| Video of the Year: | "Forever Country" – Artist of Then, Now & Forever |
| Vocal Event of the Year: | "May We All" – Florida Georgia Line feat. Tim McGraw |
| Songwriter of the Year: | Lori McKenna |

- 2018

| Host: | Reba McEntire |
| Entertainer of the Year: | Jason Aldean |
| Song of the Year: | "Tin Man" – Jack Ingram, Miranda Lambert, Jon Randall |
| Single Record of the Year: | "Body Like a Back Road" – Sam Hunt |
| Album of the Year: | From A Room: Volume 1 – Chris Stapleton |
| Male Vocalist of the Year: | Chris Stapleton |
| Female Vocalist of the Year: | Miranda Lambert |
| Vocal Duo of the Year: | Brothers Osborne |
| Vocal Group of the Year: | Old Dominion |
| New Male Vocalist of the Year: | Brett Young |
| New Female Vocalist of the Year: | Lauren Alaina |
| New Vocal Duo or Group of the Year: | Midland |
| Video of the Year: | "It Ain’t My Fault" – Brothers Osborne |
| Vocal Event of the Year: | "The Fighter" – Keith Urban featuring Carrie Underwood |
| Songwriter of the Year: | Rhett Akins |

- 2019

| Host: | Reba McEntire |
| Entertainer of the Year: | Keith Urban |
| Song of the Year: | "Tequila" - Nicolle Galyon, Jordan Reynolds, Dan Smyers |
| Single Record of the Year: | "Tequila" - Dan + Shay |
| Album of the Year: | Golden Hour - Kacey Musgraves |
| Male Vocalist of the Year: | Thomas Rhett |
| Female Vocalist of the Year: | Kacey Musgraves |
| Vocal Duo of the Year: | Dan + Shay |
| Vocal Group of the Year: | Old Dominion |
| New Male Vocalist of the Year: | Luke Combs |
| New Female Vocalist of the Year: | Ashley McBryde |
| New Vocal Duo or Group of the Year: | Lanco |
| Video of the Year: | "Drunk Girl" - Chris Janson |
| Vocal Event of the Year: | "Burning Man" - Dierks Bentley, Brothers Osborne |
| Songwriter of the Year: | Shane McAnally |

== See also ==
- List of Country Music Association Awards ceremonies
