= Academy of Country Music Award for New Vocal Duo or Group of the Year =

Annual US country music award

- Country: United States
- Presented by: Academy of Country Music
- First award: 1967
- Currently held by: The Red Clay Strays (60th)

The Academy of Country Music Award for New Vocal Duo or Group of the Year is one of the new artist categories presented at the Academy of Country Music Awards. This award was first awarded in 1967 to Bob Morris & Faye Hardin, when this award was known as the Most Promising Vocal Group.

In 1967, this award was known as the Most Promising Vocal Group.

From 1990 to 2008, the award was known as the Top New Vocal Duet/Duo or Group.

And from 2016 to 2019, this award is now known as the New Vocal Duo or Group of the Year.

And from 2024 to now, the award is known as the New Duo/Group of the Year

This award is given to the new vocal group or formed duo who has gained initial fame or significantly greater recognition during the promotion of a debut or sophomore album within the eligibility period. The artist must have released a single that reached the Top 40 on Billboard's Hot Country Songs or the Mediabase Country charts. Any albums self-released through an independent label the artist owns and operates may not be counted as a debut or sophomore album, unless it produces a Top 40 single reported by Billboard's Hot Country Songs or Mediabase Country charts.

== Winners and nominees ==
In the following tables, the years correspond to the date of the ceremony. Artists are eligible based on their work of the previous calendar year. Entries with a blue ribbon next to the artist's name have won the award; those with a white background are the nominees on the short-list.

There was no winner for this award in 2004, 2005, and from 2009 to 2015. For the award was changed into the Academy of Country Music Award for New Artist of the Year award. The winners in 2009 and 2013 would be finalist for the New Artist of the Year.

=== 2020s ===
Year	Winner	Nominees
2025	The Red Clay Strays	Restless Road; Treaty Oak Revival
2024	Tigirlily Gold	Neon Union; Restless Road

=== 2010s ===
Year	Winner	Nominees
2019	Lanco	High Valley; Runaway June
2018	Midland	High Valley; Lanco; LoCash; Runaway June
2017	Brothers Osborne	A Thousand Horses; Dan + Shay; LoCash; Maddie & Tae
2016	Old Dominion	A Thousand Horses; Brothers Osborne; Maddie & Tae; Parmalee
2013	Florida Georgia Line	Love and Theft; Thompson Square

=== 2000s ===
Year	Winner	Nominees
2009	Zac Brown Band	Eli Young Band; The Lost Trailers
2008	Lady A	Carolina Rain; The Wreckers
2007	Little Big Town	Heartland; The Wreckers
2006	Sugarland	Big & Rich; Little Big Town
2003	Emerson Drive	Nickel Creek; Pinmonkey
2002	Trick Pony	Nickel Creek; Sons of the Desert
2001	Rascal Flatts	Clark Family Experience; Sons of the Desert
2000	Montgomery Gentry	SHeDAISY; Yankee Grey

=== 1990s ===
Year	Winner	Nominees	Ref.
1999	Dixie Chicks	The Warren Brothers; The Wilkinsons	
1998	The Kinleys	Big House; The Lynns	
1997	Ricochet	BR5-49; Burnin' Daylight	
1996	Lonestar	4 Runner; Perfect Stranger	
1995	The Mavericks	The Tractors; John & Audrey Wiggins	
1994	Gibson/Miller Band	BlackHawk; Boy Howdy	
1993	Confederate Railroad	Great Plains; Little Texas	
1992	Brooks & Dunn	Diamond Rio; McBride & the Ride	
1991	Pirates of the Mississippi	Canyon; Prairie Oyster	
1990	The Kentucky Headhunters	Shenandoah; Wild Rose	

=== 1960s ===
Year	Winner	Nominees
1967	Bob Morris & Faye Hardin	Bobby Durham & Jeanie O'Neal; The LeGarde Twins; The Leightons; Del & Sue Smart
