= Robert Durham =

Robert Durham may refer to:

- Robert D. Durham (born 1947), judge
- Bobby Durham (jazz musician) (1937–2008), American jazz drummer
- Bobby Durham (country musician) (born 1942), American country singer
- Robert Durham (arena football) (born 1983), American football defensive back
- Robert Lee Durham (1870–1949), American engineer, teacher and author
- Robert L. Durham (1912–1998), American architect
