= 49th Academy of Country Music Awards =

US music awards ceremony in 2014

- Date: April 6, 2014
- Location: MGM Grand Garden Arena, Las Vegas, Nevada
- Hosted by: Luke Bryan; Blake Shelton

Highlights
- Most wins: Miranda Lambert (3)
- Most nominations: Miranda Lambert; Taylor Swift; Keith Urban; (5 each)

Television/radio coverage
- Network: CBS

The 49th Academy of Country Music Awards were held on Sunday, April 6, 2014, at the MGM Grand Garden Arena, Las Vegas, Nevada. The ceremony was hosted by Luke Bryan and Blake Shelton.

== Winners and nominees ==
Winners are shown in bold.

Entertainer of the Year (Note: From 2008 to 2015, 'Entertainer of the Year' was decided by a combination of ACM professional membership and fan votes cast online and via text message.)	Album of the Year
**George Strait**; Luke Bryan; Miranda Lambert; Blake Shelton; Taylor Swift	**Same Trailer Different Park** — **Kacey Musgraves**; Based on a True Story... — Blake Shelton; Crash My Party — Luke Bryan; Here's To The Good Times — Florida Georgia Line; Two Lanes Of Freedom — Tim McGraw
Female Artist of the Year	Male Artist of the Year
**Miranda Lambert**; Sheryl Crow; Kacey Musgraves; Taylor Swift; Carrie Underwood	**Jason Aldean**; Lee Brice; Luke Bryan; Blake Shelton; Keith Urban
Vocal Group of the Year	Vocal Duo of the Year
**The Band Perry**; Eli Young Band; Lady Antebellum; Little Big Town; Zac Brown Band	**Florida Georgia Line**; Big & Rich; Dan + Shay; Love and Theft; Thompson Square
Single of the Year	Song of the Year
"**Mama's Broken Heart**" — **Miranda Lambert**; "Cruise" — Florida Georgia Line; "Highway Don't Care" — Tim McGraw, Taylor Swift, Keith Urban; "I Drive Your Truck" — Lee Brice; "Wagon Wheel" — Darius Rucker, Lady Antebellum	**"I Drive Your Truck"** — **Jessi Alexander, Connie Harrington, Jimmy Yeary**; "Every Storm (Runs Out of Rain)" — Gary Allan, Hillary Lindsey, Matthew Warren; "Mama's Broken Heart" — Brandy Clark, Shane McAnally, Kacey Musgraves; "Mine Would Be You" — Jessi Alexander, Connie Harrington, Deric Ruttan; "Wagon Wheel" — Bob Dylan, Ketch Secor
New Artist of the Year	Video of the Year
**Justin Moore**; Brett Eldredge; Kip Moore	**"Highway Don't Care"** — **Tim McGraw, Taylor Swift, Keith Urban**; "Better Dig Two" — The Band Perry; "Blowin' Smoke" — Kacey Musgraves; "I Drive Your Truck" — Lee Brice; "Mama's Broken Heart" — Miranda Lambert; "Two Black Cadillacs" — Carrie Underwood
Vocal Event of the Year
**"We Were Us"** — **Keith Urban and Miranda Lambert**; "Boys 'Round Here" — Blake Shelton and Pistol Annies; "Cruise (Remix)" — Florida Georgia Line and Nelly; "Highway Don't Care" — Tim McGraw, Taylor Swift, Keith Urban; "Wagon Wheel" — Darius Rucker, Lady Antebellum
