= 2nd Academy of Country and Western Music Awards =

US music awards ceremony in 1967

- Date: March 6, 1967
- Location: The Beverly Hilton, Los Angeles, California
- Hosted by: Lorne Greene

Highlights
- Most wins: Merle Haggard (2)
- Most nominations: Merle Haggard (4)

The 2nd Academy of Country and Western Music Awards ceremony was held on March 6, 1967, at The Beverly Hilton, Los Angeles, California. It was hosted by Lorne Greene.

== Winners and nominees ==
Winners are shown in bold.

Top Female Vocalist of the Year	Top Male Vocalist of the Year
**Bonnie Guitar**; Kay Adams; Molly Bee; Jonie Mosby; Bonnie Owens	**Merle Haggard**; Glen Campbell; Roger Miller; Buck Owens; Wynn Stewart; Tex Williams
Top Vocal Group of the Year	Song of the Year
**Bonnie Owens** **and** **Merle Haggard**; The Canadian Sweethearts; Everly Brothers; Joe and Rose Lee Maphis; Johnny and Jonie Mosby	**"Apartment No. 9"** — **Fern Foley, Charles "Fuzzy" Owen, Johnny Paycheck**; "The Bottle Let Me Down" — Merle Haggard; "Husbands and Wives" — Roger Miller; "Swinging Doors" — Merle Haggard; "Terrible Tangled Web" — Billy Mize; "Waitin' in Your Welfare Line" — Buck Owens, Don Rich, Nat Stuckey
Most Promising Male Vocalist	Most Promising Female Vocalist
**Billy Mize**; Bobby Austin; Dick Curless; Eddy Downs; Glen Garrison; Jerry Inman; Red Simpson	**Cathie Taylor**; Jeanne Black; Faye Hardin; Betty Foster; Alice Rene
Most Promising Vocal Group	Band Leader/Band of the Year
**Bob Morris & Faye Hardin**; Bobby Durham & Jeanie O'Neal; The LeGarde Twins; The Leightons; Del & Sue Smart	**The Buckaroos**; Carl Cotner; Jerry Inman; The Strangers; The Tennesseans
