= List of Country Music Association Awards ceremonies =

This is a list of Country Music Association Awards ceremonies and the winners in each ceremony.

== Ceremonies ==
Below is a list of ceremonies, the years the ceremonies were held, their hosts, the television networks that aired them, and their locations.

Year	Order	Host(s)	Network	Site	Viewership (million)	Air date
1967	1st	Bobbie Gentry and Sonny James	—N/a	Municipal Auditorium, Nashville, Tennessee		October 20
1968	2nd	Dale Evans and Roy Rogers	NBC	Ryman Auditorium, Nashville, Tennessee		November 20
1969	3rd	Tennessee Ernie Ford	NBC	Ryman Auditorium, Nashville, Tennessee		October 15
1970	4th	Tennessee Ernie Ford	NBC	Ryman Auditorium, Nashville, Tennessee		October 14
1971	5th	Tennessee Ernie Ford	NBC	Ryman Auditorium, Nashville, Tennessee		October 10
1972	6th	Glen Campbell	CBS	Ryman Auditorium, Nashville, Tennessee		October 16
1973	7th	Johnny Cash	CBS	Ryman Auditorium, Nashville, Tennessee		October 15
1974	8th	Johnny Cash	CBS	Grand Ole Opry House, Nashville, Tennessee		October 14
1975	9th	Glen Campbell and Charley Pride	CBS	Grand Ole Opry House, Nashville, Tennessee		October 13
1976	10th	Johnny Cash and Roy Clark	CBS	Grand Ole Opry House, Nashville, Tennessee		October 11
1977	11th	Johnny Cash	CBS	Grand Ole Opry House, Nashville, Tennessee		October 10
1978	12th	Johnny Cash	CBS	Grand Ole Opry House, Nashville, Tennessee		October 9
1979	13th	Kenny Rogers	CBS	Grand Ole Opry House, Nashville, Tennessee		October 8
1980	14th	Mac Davis and Barbara Mandrell	CBS	Grand Ole Opry House, Nashville, Tennessee		October 13
1981	15th	Mac Davis and Barbara Mandrell	CBS	Grand Ole Opry House, Nashville, Tennessee		October 12
1982	16th	Mac Davis and Barbara Mandrell	CBS	Grand Ole Opry House, Nashville, Tennessee		October 11
1983	17th	Anne Murray and Willie Nelson	CBS	Grand Ole Opry House, Nashville, Tennessee		October 10
1984	18th	Kenny Rogers	CBS	Grand Ole Opry House, Nashville, Tennessee		October 8
1985	19th	Kris Kristofferson and Anne Murray	CBS	Grand Ole Opry House, Nashville, Tennessee		October 14
1986	20th	Kris Kristofferson and Willie Nelson	CBS	Grand Ole Opry House, Nashville, Tennessee		October 13
1987	21st	Kenny Rogers	CBS	Grand Ole Opry House, Nashville, Tennessee		October 12
1988	22nd	Dolly Parton	CBS	Grand Ole Opry House, Nashville, Tennessee		October 24
1989	23rd	Anne Murray and Kenny Rogers	CBS	Grand Ole Opry House, Nashville, Tennessee		October 9
1990	24th	Reba McEntire and Randy Travis	CBS	Grand Ole Opry House, Nashville, Tennessee		October 8
1991	25th	Reba McEntire	CBS	Grand Ole Opry House, Nashville, Tennessee		October 2
1992	26th	Reba McEntire and Vince Gill	CBS	Grand Ole Opry House, Nashville, Tennessee		September 30
1993	27th	Clint Black and Vince Gill	CBS	Grand Ole Opry House, Nashville, Tennessee		September 29
1994	28th	Vince Gill	CBS	Grand Ole Opry House, Nashville, Tennessee		October 5
1995	29th	Vince Gill	CBS	Grand Ole Opry House, Nashville, Tennessee		October 4
1996	30th	Vince Gill	CBS	Grand Ole Opry House, Nashville, Tennessee		October 2
1997	31st	Vince Gill	CBS	Grand Ole Opry House, Nashville, Tennessee		September 24
1998	32nd	Vince Gill	CBS	Grand Ole Opry House, Nashville, Tennessee		September 23
1999	33rd	Vince Gill	CBS	Grand Ole Opry House, Nashville, Tennessee		September 22
2000	34th	Vince Gill	CBS	Grand Ole Opry House, Nashville, Tennessee		October 4
2001	35th	Vince Gill	CBS	Grand Ole Opry House, Nashville, Tennessee		November 7
2002	36th	Vince Gill	CBS	Grand Ole Opry House, Nashville, Tennessee		November 6
2003	37th	Vince Gill	CBS	Grand Ole Opry House, Nashville, Tennessee		November 5
2004	38th	Brooks & Dunn	CBS	Grand Ole Opry House, Nashville, Tennessee		November 9
2005	39th	Brooks & Dunn	CBS	Madison Square Garden, New York City		November 15
2006	40th	Brooks & Dunn	ABC	Bridgestone Arena, Nashville, Tennessee	16.0	November 6
2007	41st	—N/a	ABC	Bridgestone Arena, Nashville, Tennessee	16.0	November 7
2008	42nd	Brad Paisley and Carrie Underwood	ABC	Bridgestone Arena, Nashville, Tennessee	15.9	November 12
2009	43rd	Brad Paisley and Carrie Underwood	ABC	Bridgestone Arena, Nashville, Tennessee	17.1	November 11
2010	44th	Brad Paisley and Carrie Underwood	ABC	Bridgestone Arena, Nashville, Tennessee	16.4	November 10
2011	45th	Brad Paisley and Carrie Underwood	ABC	Bridgestone Arena, Nashville, Tennessee	16.3	November 9
2012	46th	Brad Paisley and Carrie Underwood	ABC	Bridgestone Arena, Nashville, Tennessee	13.4	November 1
2013	47th	Brad Paisley and Carrie Underwood	ABC	Bridgestone Arena, Nashville, Tennessee	16.6	November 6
2014	48th	Brad Paisley and Carrie Underwood	ABC	Bridgestone Arena, Nashville, Tennessee	16.1	November 5
2015	49th	Brad Paisley and Carrie Underwood	ABC	Bridgestone Arena, Nashville, Tennessee	13.62	November 4
2016	50th	Brad Paisley and Carrie Underwood	ABC	Bridgestone Arena, Nashville, Tennessee	12.8	November 2
2017	51st	Brad Paisley and Carrie Underwood	ABC	Bridgestone Arena, Nashville, Tennessee	14.29	November 8
2018	52nd	Brad Paisley and Carrie Underwood	ABC	Bridgestone Arena, Nashville, Tennessee	10.1	November 14
2019	53rd	Carrie Underwood (with Reba McEntire and Dolly Parton)	ABC	Bridgestone Arena, Nashville, Tennessee	11.27	November 13
2020	54th	Reba McEntire and Darius Rucker	ABC	Music City Center, Nashville, Tennessee	7.1	November 11
2021	55th	Luke Bryan	ABC	Bridgestone Arena, Nashville, Tennessee	8.4	November 10
2022	56th	Luke Bryan and Peyton Manning	ABC	Bridgestone Arena, Nashville, Tennessee	9.7	November 9
2023	57th	Luke Bryan and Peyton Manning	ABC	Bridgestone Arena, Nashville, Tennessee	6.8	November 8
2024	58th	Luke Bryan, Peyton Manning, and Lainey Wilson	ABC	Bridgestone Arena, Nashville, Tennessee	6.1	November 20
2025	59th	Lainey Wilson	ABC	Bridgestone Arena, Nashville, Tennessee	6.03	November 19
2026	60th	Lainey Wilson	ABC, Disney+	Bridgestone Arena, Nashville, Tennessee		November 18

== Most wins and nominations ==
Below is a list of most wins and most nominations received by an artist each ceremony.

Year	Most wins		Most Nominations	
Year	Artist(s)	(#)	Artist(s)	(#)
2026	Ella Langley	6	Ella Langley	9
2025	Riley Green, Ella Langley, Lainey Wilson	3	Ella Langley, Megan Moroney, Lainey Wilson	6
2024	Chris Stapleton	3	Morgan Wallen	7
2023	Lainey Wilson	5	Lainey Wilson	9
2022	Luke Combs, Cody Johnson, Lainey Wilson	2	Lainey Wilson	6
2021	Chris Stapleton	4	Eric Church, Chris Stapleton	5
2020	Maren Morris	3	Miranda Lambert	7
2019	Luke Combs, Kacey Musgraves	2	Maren Morris	6
2018	Chris Stapleton	3	Chris Stapleton	5
2017	Chris Stapleton	2	Miranda Lambert	5
2016	Chris Stapleton	2	Eric Church, Maren Morris, Chris Stapleton	5
2015	Chris Stapleton	3	Eric Church, Little Big Town	5
2014	Miranda Lambert	4	Miranda Lambert	9
2013	Florida Georgia Line, Tim McGraw, Blake Shelton, Taylor Swift, Keith Urban	2	Kacey Musgraves, Taylor Swift	6
2012	Blake Shelton	3	Eric Church	5
2011	The Band Perry	3	Jason Aldean, Brad Paisley, Taylor Swift	5
2010	Miranda Lambert	4	Miranda Lambert	9
2009	Taylor Swift	4	Brad Paisley	7
2008	Brad Paisley, George Strait	2	Kenny Chesney	7
2007	Kenny Chesney, Brad Paisley, Carrie Underwood	2	Brad Paisley, George Strait	5
2006	Brooks & Dunn	3	Brooks & Dunn, Brad Paisley	6
2005	Lee Ann Womack	3	Brad Paisley, Lee Ann Womack	7
2004	Kenny Chesney, Alison Krauss, Tim McGraw, Brad Paisley	2	Alan Jackson	7
2003	Johnny Cash, Alan Jackson	3	Toby Keith	7
2002	Alan Jackson	5	Alan Jackson	10
2001	n/a	n/a	Sara Evans	5
2000	The Chicks	4	Faith Hill	6
1999	The Chicks	3	Vince Gill, Tim McGraw	5
1998	Steve Wariner	3	Tim McGraw, George Strait	5
1997	George Strait	2	George Strait	6
1996	George Strait	3	Vince Gill	7
1995	Alison Krauss	4	Alan Jackson	6
1994	Vince Gill	3	Reba McEntire	6
1993	Vince Gill	5	Vince Gill	8
1992	Garth Brooks, Vince Gill	2	Vince Gill, Travis Tritt	5
1991	Garth Brooks	4	Vince Gill, Alan Jackson	6
1990	Garth Brooks, Kentucky Headhunters	2	Garth Brooks	5
1989	Hank Williams Jr., Hank Williams Sr.	2	Hank Williams Jr., Ricky Van Shelton, Rodney Crowell	4
1988	K.T. Oslin, Hank Williams Jr.	2	K.T. Oslin	5
1987	Randy Travis	3	Randy Travis	5
1986	Reba McEntire, Dan Seals	2	The Judds, Reba McEntire	5
1985	The Judds, George Strait	2	Ricky Skaggs	5
1984	Anne Murray	2	Alabama, Lee Greenwood	4
1983	Alabama	3	Merle Haggard	6
1982	Alabama	3	Alabama, Willie Nelson	5
1981	Alabama, Barbara Mandrell	2	Alabama	5
1980	George Jones	2	Kenny Rogers, Charlie Daniels Band, Larry Gatlin & The Gatlin Brothers	4
1979	Kenny Rogers	3	Kenny Rogers	5
1978	n/a	n/a		
1977	Ronnie Milsap	3		
1976	Waylon Jennings, Willie Nelson	3		
1975	John Denver	2		
1974	Charlie Rich	2		
1973	Charlie Rich	3		
1972	Loretta Lynn	3		
1971	Charley Pride	2		
1970	Merle Haggard	4		
1969	Johnny Cash	5		
1968	Glen Campbell	2		
1967	Jack Greene	3		

== Categorical winners ==
Below is a list of winners in the major categories by year.

=== 1960s ===
1967

Entertainer of the Year:	Eddy Arnold
Song of the Year:	"There Goes My Everything" – Dallas Frazier
Single of the Year:	"There Goes My Everything" – Jack Greene
Album of the Year:	There Goes My Everything – Jack Greene
Male Vocalist of the Year:	Jack Greene
Female Vocalist of the Year:	Loretta Lynn
Vocal Group of the Year:	The Stoneman Family
Instrumentalist of the Year:	Chet Atkins
Instrumental Group of the Year:	The Buckaroos
Comedian of the Year:	Don Bowman
Country Music Hall of Fame	Red Foley, Joseph Lee Frank, Jim Reeves, Stephen Sholes

1968

Entertainer of the Year:	Glen Campbell
Song of the Year:	"Honey" – Bobby Russell
Single of the Year:	"Harper Valley PTA" – Jeannie C. Riley
Album of the Year:	At Folsom Prison – Johnny Cash
Male Vocalist of the Year:	Glen Campbell
Female Vocalist of the Year:	Tammy Wynette
Vocal Group of the Year:	Porter Wagoner and Dolly Parton
Instrumentalist of the Year:	Chet Atkins
Instrumental Group of the Year:	The Buckaroos
Comedian of the Year:	Ben Colder
Country Music Hall of Fame	Bob Wills

1969

Entertainer of the Year:	Johnny Cash
Song of the Year:	"The Carroll County Accident" – Bob Ferguson
Single of the Year:	"A Boy Named Sue" – Johnny Cash
Album of the Year:	At San Quentin – Johnny Cash
Male Vocalist of the Year:	Johnny Cash
Female Vocalist of the Year:	Tammy Wynette
Vocal Group of the Year:	Johnny Cash and June Carter Cash
Instrumentalist of the Year:	Chet Atkins
Instrumental Group of the Year:	Danny Davis and the Nashville Brass
Comedian of the Year:	Archie Campbell
Country Music Hall of Fame	Gene Autry

=== 1970s ===
1970

Entertainer of the Year:	Merle Haggard
Song of the Year:	"Sunday Mornin' Comin' Down" – Kris Kristofferson
Single of the Year:	"Okie from Muskogee" – Merle Haggard
Album of the Year:	Okie from Muskogee – Merle Haggard
Male Vocalist of the Year:	Merle Haggard
Female Vocalist of the Year:	Tammy Wynette
Vocal Duo of the Year:	Porter Wagoner and Dolly Parton
Vocal Group of the Year:	Tompall and the Glaser Brothers
Instrumentalist of the Year:	Jerry Reed
Instrumental Group of the Year:	Danny Davis and the Nashville Brass
Comedian of the Year:	Roy Clark
Country Music Hall of Fame	Carter Family, Bill Monroe

1971

Entertainer of the Year:	Charley Pride
Song of the Year:	"Easy Loving" – Freddie Hart
Single of the Year:	"Help Me Make It Through the Night" – Sammi Smith
Album of the Year:	I Won't Mention It Again – Ray Price
Male Vocalist of the Year:	Charley Pride
Female Vocalist of the Year:	Lynn Anderson
Vocal Duo of the Year:	Porter Wagoner and Dolly Parton
Vocal Group of the Year:	Osborne Brothers
Instrumentalist of the Year:	Jerry Reed
Instrumental Group of the Year:	Danny Davis and the Nashville Brass
Country Music Hall of Fame	Arthur Satherley

1972

Entertainer of the Year:	Loretta Lynn
Song of the Year:	"Easy Loving" – Freddie Hart
Single of the Year:	"The Happiest Girl In the Whole USA" – Donna Fargo
Album of the Year:	Let Me Tell You About a Song – Merle Haggard
Male Vocalist of the Year:	Charley Pride
Female Vocalist of the Year:	Loretta Lynn
Vocal Duo of the Year:	Conway Twitty and Loretta Lynn
Vocal Group of the Year:	The Statler Brothers
Instrumentalist of the Year:	Charlie McCoy
Instrumental Group of the Year:	Danny Davis and the Nashville Brass
Country Music Hall of Fame	Jimmie Davis

1973

Entertainer of the Year:	Roy Clark
Song of the Year:	"Behind Closed Doors" – Kenny O'Dell
Single of the Year:	"Behind Closed Doors" – Charlie Rich
Album of the Year:	Behind Closed Doors – Charlie Rich
Male Vocalist of the Year:	Charlie Rich
Female Vocalist of the Year:	Loretta Lynn
Vocal Duo of the Year:	Conway Twitty and Loretta Lynn
Vocal Group of the Year:	The Statler Brothers
Instrumentalist of the Year:	Charlie McCoy
Instrumental Group of the Year:	Danny Davis and the Nashville Brass
Country Music Hall of Fame	Chet Atkins, Patsy Cline

1974

Entertainer of the Year:	Charlie Rich
Song of the Year:	"Country Bumpkin" – Don Wayne
Single of the Year:	"Country Bumpkin" – Cal Smith
Album of the Year:	A Very Special Love Song – Charlie Rich
Male Vocalist of the Year:	Ronnie Milsap
Female Vocalist of the Year:	Olivia Newton-John
Vocal Duo of the Year:	Conway Twitty and Loretta Lynn
Vocal Group of the Year:	The Statler Brothers
Instrumentalist of the Year:	Don Rich
Instrumental Group of the Year:	Danny Davis and the Nashville Brass
Country Music Hall of Fame	Owen Bradley, Pee Wee King

1975

Entertainer of the Year:	John Denver
Song of the Year:	"Back Home Again" – John Denver
Single of the Year:	"Before the Next Teardrop Falls" – Freddy Fender
Album of the Year:	A Legend in My Time – Ronnie Milsap
Male Vocalist of the Year:	Waylon Jennings
Female Vocalist of the Year:	Dolly Parton
Vocal Duo of the Year:	Conway Twitty and Loretta Lynn
Vocal Group of the Year:	The Statler Brothers
Instrumentalist of the Year:	Johnny Gimble
Instrumental Group of the Year:	Roy Clark and Buck Trent
Country Music Hall of Fame	Minnie Pearl

1976

Entertainer of the Year:	Mel Tillis
Song of the Year:	"Rhinestone Cowboy" – Larry Weiss
Single of the Year:	"Good Hearted Woman" – Waylon Jennings and Willie Nelson
Album of the Year:	Wanted! The Outlaws – Waylon Jennings, Willie Nelson, Tompall Glaser, Jessi Colter
Male Vocalist of the Year:	Ronnie Milsap
Female Vocalist of the Year:	Dolly Parton
Vocal Duo of the Year:	Waylon Jennings and Willie Nelson
Vocal Group of the Year:	The Statler Brothers
Instrumentalist of the Year:	Hargus "Pig" Robbins
Instrumental Group of the Year:	Roy Clark and Buck Trent
Country Music Hall of Fame	Paul Cohen, Kitty Wells

1977

Entertainer of the Year:	Ronnie Milsap
Song of the Year:	"Lucille" – Roger Bowling and Hal Bynum
Single of the Year:	"Lucille" – Kenny Rogers
Album of the Year:	Ronnie Milsap Live – Ronnie Milsap
Male Vocalist of the Year:	Ronnie Milsap
Female Vocalist of the Year:	Crystal Gayle
Vocal Duo of the Year:	Jim Ed Brown and Helen Cornelius
Vocal Group of the Year:	The Statler Brothers
Instrumentalist of the Year:	Roy Clark
Instrumental Group of the Year:	Original Texas Playboys
Country Music Hall of Fame	Merle Travis

1978

Entertainer of the Year:	Dolly Parton
Song of the Year:	"Don't It Make My Brown Eyes Blue" – Richard Leigh
Single of the Year:	"Heaven's Just a Sin Away" – The Kendalls
Album of the Year:	It Was Almost Like a Song – Ronnie Milsap
Male Vocalist of the Year:	Don Williams
Female Vocalist of the Year:	Crystal Gayle
Vocal Duo of the Year:	Kenny Rogers and Dottie West
Vocal Group of the Year:	The Oak Ridge Boys
Instrumentalist of the Year:	Roy Clark
Instrumental Group of the Year:	The Oak Ridge Boys Band
Country Music Hall of Fame	Grandpa Jones

1979

Entertainer of the Year:	Willie Nelson
Song of the Year:	"The Gambler" – Don Schlitz
Single of the Year:	"The Devil Went Down to Georgia" – Charlie Daniels Band
Album of the Year:	The Gambler – Kenny Rogers
Male Vocalist of the Year:	Kenny Rogers
Female Vocalist of the Year:	Barbara Mandrell
Vocal Duo of the Year:	Kenny Rogers and Dottie West
Vocal Group of the Year:	The Statler Brothers
Instrumentalist of the Year:	Charlie Daniels
Instrumental Group of the Year:	Charlie Daniels Band
Country Music Hall of Fame	Hubert Long, Hank Snow

=== 1980s ===
1980

Entertainer of the Year:	Barbara Mandrell
Song of the Year:	"He Stopped Loving Her Today" – Bobby Braddock and Curly Putman
Single of the Year:	"He Stopped Loving Her Today" – George Jones
Album of the Year:	Coal Miner's Daughter soundtrack – Beverly D'Angelo, Levon Helm, and Sissy Spacek
Male Vocalist of the Year:	George Jones
Female Vocalist of the Year:	Emmylou Harris
Vocal Duo of the Year:	Moe Bandy and Joe Stampley
Vocal Group of the Year:	The Statler Brothers
Instrumentalist of the Year:	Roy Clark
Instrumental Group of the Year:	Charlie Daniels Band
Country Music Hall of Fame	Johnny Cash, Connie B. Gay, Sons of the Pioneers

1981

Entertainer of the Year:	Barbara Mandrell
Song of the Year:	"He Stopped Loving Her Today" – Bobby Braddock and Curly Putman
Single of the Year:	"Elvira" – The Oak Ridge Boys
Album of the Year:	I Believe in You – Don Williams
Male Vocalist of the Year:	George Jones
Female Vocalist of the Year:	Barbara Mandrell
Vocal Duo of the Year:	David Frizzell and Shelly West
Vocal Group of the Year:	Alabama
Instrumentalist of the Year:	Chet Atkins
Horizon Award:	Terri Gibbs
Instrumental Group of the Year:	Alabama
Country Music Hall of Fame	Vernon Dalhart, Grant Turner

1982

Entertainer of the Year:	Alabama
Song of the Year:	"Always on My Mind" – Johnny Christopher, Wayne Carson Thompson and Mark James
Single of the Year:	"Always on My Mind" – Willie Nelson
Album of the Year:	Always on My Mind – Willie Nelson
Male Vocalist of the Year:	Ricky Skaggs
Female Vocalist of the Year:	Janie Fricke
Vocal Duo of the Year:	David Frizzell and Shelly West
Vocal Group of the Year:	Alabama
Instrumentalist of the Year:	Chet Atkins
Horizon Award:	Ricky Skaggs
Instrumental Group of the Year:	Alabama
Country Music Hall of Fame	Lefty Frizzell, Roy Horton, Marty Robbins

1983

Entertainer of the Year:	Alabama
Song of the Year:	"Always on My Mind" – Johnny Christopher, Wayne Carson Thompson and Mark James
Single of the Year:	"Swingin'" – John Anderson
Album of the Year:	The Closer You Get… – Alabama
Male Vocalist of the Year:	Lee Greenwood
Female Vocalist of the Year:	Janie Fricke
Vocal Duo of the Year:	Merle Haggard and Willie Nelson
Vocal Group of the Year:	Alabama
Instrumentalist of the Year:	Chet Atkins
Horizon Award:	John Anderson
Instrumental Group of the Year:	Ricky Skaggs Band
Country Music Hall of Fame	Little Jimmy Dickens

1984

Entertainer of the Year:	Alabama
Song of the Year:	"Wind Beneath My Wings" – Larry Henley and Jeff Silbar
Single of the Year:	"A Little Good News" – Anne Murray
Album of the Year:	A Little Good News – Anne Murray
Male Vocalist of the Year:	Lee Greenwood
Female Vocalist of the Year:	Reba McEntire
Vocal Duo of the Year:	Willie Nelson and Julio Iglesias
Vocal Group of the Year:	The Statler Brothers
Instrumentalist of the Year:	Chet Atkins
Horizon Award:	The Judds
Instrumental Group of the Year:	Ricky Skaggs Band
Country Music Hall of Fame	Ralph Peer, Floyd Tillman

1985

Entertainer of the Year:	Ricky Skaggs
Song of the Year:	"God Bless the USA" – Lee Greenwood
Single of the Year:	"Why Not Me" – The Judds
Album of the Year:	Does Fort Worth Ever Cross Your Mind – George Strait
Male Vocalist of the Year:	George Strait
Female Vocalist of the Year:	Reba McEntire
Vocal Duo of the Year:	Anne Murray and Dave Loggins
Vocal Group of the Year:	The Judds
Instrumentalist of the Year:	Chet Atkins
Horizon Award:	Sawyer Brown
Instrumental Group of the Year:	Ricky Skaggs Band
Music Video of the Year:	"All My Rowdy Friends Are Coming Over Tonight" – Hank Williams, Jr.
Country Music Hall of Fame	Flatt and Scruggs

1986

Entertainer of the Year:	Reba McEntire
Song of the Year:	"On the Other Hand" – Paul Overstreet and Don Schlitz
Single of the Year:	"Bop" – Dan Seals
Album of the Year:	Lost in the Fifties Tonight – Ronnie Milsap
Male Vocalist of the Year:	George Strait
Female Vocalist of the Year:	Reba McEntire
Vocal Duo of the Year:	Dan Seals and Marie Osmond
Vocal Group of the Year:	The Judds
Instrumentalist of the Year:	Johnny Gimble
Horizon Award:	Randy Travis
Instrumental Group of the Year:	The Oak Ridge Boys Band
Music Video of the Year:	"Who's Gonna Fill Their Shoes" – George Jones
Country Music Hall of Fame	Wesley Rose and The Duke of Paducah

1987

Entertainer of the Year:	Hank Williams, Jr.
Song of the Year:	"Forever and Ever, Amen" – Paul Overstreet and Don Schlitz
Single of the Year:	"Forever and Ever, Amen" – Randy Travis
Album of the Year:	Always & Forever – Randy Travis
Male Vocalist of the Year:	Randy Travis
Female Vocalist of the Year:	Reba McEntire
Vocal Duo of the Year:	Ricky Skaggs and Sharon White
Vocal Group of the Year:	The Judds
Instrumentalist of the Year:	Johnny Gimble
Horizon Award:	Holly Dunn
Music Video of the Year:	"My Name Is Bocephus" – Hank Williams, Jr.
Country Music Hall of Fame	Rod Brasfield

1988

Entertainer of the Year:	Hank Williams, Jr.
Song of the Year:	"80's Ladies" – K. T. Oslin
Single of the Year:	"Eighteen Wheels and a Dozen Roses" – Kathy Mattea
Album of the Year:	Born to Boogie – Hank Williams, Jr.
Male Vocalist of the Year:	Randy Travis
Female Vocalist of the Year:	K. T. Oslin
Vocal Duo of the Year:	The Judds
Vocal Group of the Year:	Highway 101
Musician of the Year:	Chet Atkins
Horizon Award:	Ricky Van Shelton
Vocal Event of the Year:	Trio – Dolly Parton, Linda Ronstadt and Emmylou Harris
Country Music Hall of Fame	Loretta Lynn, Roy Rogers

1989

Entertainer of the Year:	George Strait
Song of the Year:	"Chiseled in Stone" – Max D. Barnes and Vern Gosdin
Single of the Year:	"I'm No Stranger to the Rain" – Keith Whitley
Album of the Year:	Will the Circle Be Unbroken: Volume Two – Nitty Gritty Dirt Band
Male Vocalist of the Year:	Ricky Van Shelton
Female Vocalist of the Year:	Kathy Mattea
Vocal Duo of the Year:	The Judds
Vocal Group of the Year:	Highway 101
Musician of the Year:	Johnny Gimble
Horizon Award:	Clint Black
Vocal Event of the Year:	"There's a Tear in My Beer" – Hank Williams, Jr. and Hank Williams
Music Video of the Year:	"There's a Tear in My Beer" – Hank Williams, Jr. and Hank Williams
Country Music Hall of Fame	Jack Stapp, Cliffie Stone, Hank Thompson

=== 1990s ===
1990

Entertainer of the Year:	George Strait
Song of the Year:	"Where've You Been" – Jon Vezner and Don Henry
Single of the Year:	"When I Call Your Name" – Vince Gill
Album of the Year:	Pickin' on Nashville – The Kentucky Headhunters
Male Vocalist of the Year:	Clint Black
Female Vocalist of the Year:	Kathy Mattea
Vocal Duo of the Year:	The Judds
Vocal Group of the Year:	The Kentucky Headhunters
Musician of the Year:	Johnny Gimble
Horizon Award:	Garth Brooks
Vocal Event of the Year:	"Til a Tear Becomes a Rose" – Lorrie Morgan and Keith Whitley
Music Video of the Year:	"The Dance" – Garth Brooks
Country Music Hall of Fame	Tennessee Ernie Ford

1991

Entertainer of the Year:	Garth Brooks
Song of the Year:	"When I Call Your Name" – Vince Gill and Tim DuBois
Single of the Year:	"Friends in Low Places" – Garth Brooks
Album of the Year:	No Fences – Garth Brooks
Male Vocalist of the Year:	Vince Gill
Female Vocalist of the Year:	Tanya Tucker
Vocal Duo of the Year:	The Judds
Vocal Group of the Year:	The Kentucky Headhunters
Musician of the Year:	Mark O'Connor
Horizon Award:	Travis Tritt
Vocal Event of the Year:	"Restless" – Mark O'Connor & the New Nashville Cats
Music Video of the Year:	"The Thunder Rolls" – Garth Brooks
Country Music Hall of Fame	Boudleaux and Felice Bryant

1992

Entertainer of the Year:	Garth Brooks
Song of the Year:	"Look at Us" – Vince Gill and Max D. Barnes
Single of the Year:	"Achy Breaky Heart" – Billy Ray Cyrus
Album of the Year:	Ropin' the Wind – Garth Brooks
Male Vocalist of the Year:	Vince Gill
Female Vocalist of the Year:	Mary Chapin Carpenter
Vocal Duo of the Year:	Brooks & Dunn
Vocal Group of the Year:	Diamond Rio
Musician of the Year:	Mark O'Connor
Horizon Award:	Suzy Bogguss
Vocal Event of the Year:	"This One's Gonna Hurt You (For a Long, Long Time)" – Marty Stuart and Travis Tritt
Music Video of the Year:	"Midnight in Montgomery" – Alan Jackson
Country Music Hall of Fame	George Jones, Frances Preston

1993

Entertainer of the Year:	Vince Gill
Song of the Year:	"I Still Believe in You" – Vince Gill and John Barlow Jarvis
Single of the Year:	"Chattahoochee" – Alan Jackson
Album of the Year:	I Still Believe in You – Vince Gill
Male Vocalist of the Year:	Vince Gill
Female Vocalist of the Year:	Mary Chapin Carpenter
Vocal Duo of the Year:	Brooks & Dunn
Vocal Group of the Year:	Diamond Rio
Musician of the Year:	Mark O'Connor
Horizon Award:	Mark Chesnutt
Vocal Event of the Year:	"I Don't Need Your Rockin' Chair" – Various Artists
Music Video of the Year:	"Chattahoochee" – Alan Jackson
Country Music Hall of Fame	Willie Nelson

1994

Entertainer of the Year:	Vince Gill
Song of the Year:	"Chattahoochee" – Alan Jackson and Jim McBride
Single of the Year:	"I Swear" – John Michael Montgomery
Album of the Year:	Common Thread: The Songs of the Eagles – Various Artists
Male Vocalist of the Year:	Vince Gill
Female Vocalist of the Year:	Pam Tillis
Vocal Duo of the Year:	Brooks & Dunn
Vocal Group of the Year:	Diamond Rio
Musician of the Year:	Mark O'Connor
Horizon Award:	John Michael Montgomery
Vocal Event of the Year:	"Does He Love You" – Reba McEntire and Linda Davis
Music Video of the Year:	"Independence Day" – Martina McBride
Country Music Hall of Fame	Merle Haggard

1995

Entertainer of the Year:	Alan Jackson
Song of the Year:	"Independence Day" – Gretchen Peters
Single of the Year:	"When You Say Nothing at All" – Alison Krauss & Union Station
Album of the Year:	When Fallen Angels Fly – Patty Loveless
Male Vocalist of the Year:	Vince Gill
Female Vocalist of the Year:	Alison Krauss
Vocal Duo of the Year:	Brooks & Dunn
Vocal Group of the Year:	The Mavericks
Musician of the Year:	Mark O'Connor
Horizon Award:	Alison Krauss
Vocal Event of the Year:	"Somewhere in the Vicinity of the Heart" – Shenandoah and Alison Krauss
Music Video of the Year:	"Baby Likes to Rock It" – The Tractors
Country Music Hall of Fame	Roger Miller, Jo Walker-Meador

1996

Entertainer of the Year:	Brooks & Dunn
Song of the Year:	"Go Rest High on That Mountain" – Vince Gill
Single of the Year:	"Check Yes or No" – George Strait
Album of the Year:	Blue Clear Sky – George Strait
Male Vocalist of the Year:	George Strait
Female Vocalist of the Year:	Patty Loveless
Vocal Duo of the Year:	Brooks & Dunn
Vocal Group of the Year:	The Mavericks
Musician of the Year:	Mark O'Connor
Horizon Award:	Bryan White
Vocal Event of the Year:	"I Will Always Love You" – Dolly Parton and Vince Gill
Music Video of the Year:	"My Wife Thinks You're Dead" – Junior Brown
Country Music Hall of Fame	Patsy Montana, Buck Owens, Ray Price

1997

Entertainer of the Year:	Garth Brooks
Song of the Year:	"Strawberry Wine" – Matraca Berg and Gary Harrison
Single of the Year:	"Strawberry Wine" – Deana Carter
Album of the Year:	Carrying Your Love with Me – George Strait
Male Vocalist of the Year:	George Strait
Female Vocalist of the Year:	Trisha Yearwood
Vocal Duo of the Year:	Brooks & Dunn
Vocal Group of the Year:	Diamond Rio
Musician of the Year:	Brent Mason
Horizon Award:	LeAnn Rimes
Vocal Event of the Year:	"It's Your Love" – Tim McGraw and Faith Hill
Music Video of the Year:	"455 Rocket" – Kathy Mattea
Country Music Hall of Fame	Harlan Howard, Brenda Lee, Cindy Walker

1998

Entertainer of the Year:	Garth Brooks
Song of the Year:	"Holes in the Floor of Heaven" – Steve Wariner and Billy Kirsch
Single of the Year:	"Holes in the Floor of Heaven" – Steve Wariner
Album of the Year:	Everywhere – Tim McGraw
Male Vocalist of the Year:	George Strait
Female Vocalist of the Year:	Trisha Yearwood
Vocal Duo of the Year:	Brooks & Dunn
Vocal Group of the Year:	Dixie Chicks
Musician of the Year:	Brent Mason
Horizon Award:	Dixie Chicks
Vocal Event of the Year:	"You Don't Seem to Miss Me" – Patty Loveless and George Jones
Music Video of the Year:	"This Kiss" – Faith Hill
Country Music Hall of Fame	George Morgan, Elvis Presley, E.W. “Bud” Wendell, Tammy Wynette

1999

Entertainer of the Year:	Shania Twain
Song of the Year:	"This Kiss" – Robin Lerner, Annie Roboff and Beth Nielsen Chapman
Single of the Year:	"Wide Open Spaces" – Dixie Chicks
Album of the Year:	A Place in the Sun – Tim McGraw
Male Vocalist of the Year:	Tim McGraw
Female Vocalist of the Year:	Martina McBride
Vocal Duo of the Year:	Brooks & Dunn
Vocal Group of the Year:	Dixie Chicks
Musician of the Year:	Randy Scruggs
Horizon Award:	Jo Dee Messina
Vocal Event of the Year:	"My Kind of Woman, My Kind of Man" – Vince Gill and Patty Loveless
Music Video of the Year:	"Wide Open Spaces" – Dixie Chicks
Country Music Hall of Fame	Johnny Bond, Dolly Parton, Conway Twitty

=== 2000s ===
2000

Entertainer of the Year:	Dixie Chicks
Song of the Year:	"I Hope You Dance" – Mark D. Sanders and Tia Sillers
Single of the Year:	"I Hope You Dance" – Lee Ann Womack
Album of the Year:	Fly – Dixie Chicks
Male Vocalist of the Year:	Tim McGraw
Female Vocalist of the Year:	Faith Hill
Vocal Duo of the Year:	Montgomery Gentry
Vocal Group of the Year:	Dixie Chicks
Musician of the Year:	Hargus "Pig" Robbins
Horizon Award:	Brad Paisley
Vocal Event of the Year:	"Murder on Music Row" – George Strait and Alan Jackson
Music Video of the Year:	"Goodbye Earl" – Dixie Chicks
Country Music Hall of Fame	Charley Pride, Faron Young

2001

Entertainer of the Year:	Tim McGraw
Song of the Year:	"Murder on Music Row" – Larry Cordle and Larry Shell
Single of the Year:	"I Am a Man of Constant Sorrow" – The Soggy Bottom Boys
Album of the Year:	O Brother, Where Art Thou? – Various Artists
Male Vocalist of the Year:	Toby Keith
Female Vocalist of the Year:	Lee Ann Womack
Vocal Duo of the Year:	Brooks & Dunn
Vocal Group of the Year:	Lonestar
Musician of the Year:	Dann Huff
Horizon Award:	Keith Urban
Vocal Event of the Year:	"Too Country" – Brad Paisley, George Jones, Bill Anderson and Buck Owens
Music Video of the Year:	"Born to Fly" – Sara Evans
Country Music Hall of Fame	Bill Anderson, Delmore Brothers, Everly Brothers, Don Gibson, Homer and Jethro, Waylon Jennings, Jordanaires, Don Law, Louvin Brothers, Ken Nelson, Sam Phillips, Webb Pierce

2002

Entertainer of the Year:	Alan Jackson
Song of the Year:	"Where Were You (When the World Stopped Turning)" – Alan Jackson
Single of the Year:	"Where Were You (When the World Stopped Turning)" – Alan Jackson
Album of the Year:	Drive – Alan Jackson
Male Vocalist of the Year:	Alan Jackson
Female Vocalist of the Year:	Martina McBride
Vocal Duo of the Year:	Brooks & Dunn
Vocal Group of the Year:	Dixie Chicks
Musician of the Year:	Jerry Douglas
Horizon Award:	Rascal Flatts
Vocal Event of the Year:	"Mendocino County Line" – Willie Nelson and Lee Ann Womack
Music Video of the Year:	"I'm Gonna Miss Her (The Fishin' Song)" – Brad Paisley
Country Music Hall of Fame	Bill Carlisle, Porter Wagoner

2003

Entertainer of the Year:	Alan Jackson
Song of the Year:	"Three Wooden Crosses" – Doug Johnson and Kim Williams
Single of the Year:	"Hurt" – Johnny Cash
Album of the Year:	American IV: The Man Comes Around – Johnny Cash
Male Vocalist of the Year:	Alan Jackson
Female Vocalist of the Year:	Martina McBride
Vocal Duo of the Year:	Brooks & Dunn
Vocal Group of the Year:	Rascal Flatts
Musician of the Year:	Randy Scruggs
Horizon Award:	Joe Nichols
Vocal Event of the Year:	"It's Five O'Clock Somewhere" – Alan Jackson and Jimmy Buffett
Music Video of the Year:	"Hurt" – Johnny Cash
Country Music Hall of Fame	Floyd Cramer, Carl Smith

2004

Entertainer of the Year:	Kenny Chesney
Song of the Year:	"Live Like You Were Dying" – Tim Nichols and Craig Wiseman
Single of the Year:	"Live Like You Were Dying" – Tim McGraw
Album of the Year:	When the Sun Goes Down – Kenny Chesney
Male Vocalist of the Year:	Keith Urban
Female Vocalist of the Year:	Martina McBride
Vocal Duo of the Year:	Brooks & Dunn
Vocal Group of the Year:	Rascal Flatts
Musician of the Year:	Dann Huff
Horizon Award:	Gretchen Wilson
Musical Event of the Year:	"Whiskey Lullaby" – Brad Paisley and Alison Krauss
Music Video of the Year:	"Whiskey Lullaby" – Brad Paisley and Alison Krauss
Country Music Hall of Fame	Jim Foglesong, Kris Kristofferson

2005

Entertainer of the Year:	Keith Urban
Song of the Year:	"Whiskey Lullaby" – Bill Anderson and Jon Randall
Single of the Year:	"I May Hate Myself in the Morning" – Lee Ann Womack
Album of the Year:	There's More Where That Came From – Lee Ann Womack
Male Vocalist of the Year:	Keith Urban
Female Vocalist of the Year:	Gretchen Wilson
Vocal Duo of the Year:	Brooks & Dunn
Vocal Group of the Year:	Rascal Flatts
Musician of the Year:	Jerry Douglas
Horizon Award:	Dierks Bentley
Musical Event of the Year:	"Good News, Bad News" – George Strait with Lee Ann Womack
Music Video of the Year:	"As Good as I Once Was" – Toby Keith
Country Music Hall of Fame	Alabama, DeFord Bailey, Glen Campbell

2006

Entertainer of the Year:	Kenny Chesney
Song of the Year:	"Believe" – Craig Wiseman and Ronnie Dunn
Single of the Year:	"Believe" – Brooks & Dunn
Album of the Year:	Time Well Wasted – Brad Paisley
Male Vocalist of the Year:	Keith Urban
Female Vocalist of the Year:	Carrie Underwood
Vocal Duo of the Year:	Brooks & Dunn
Vocal Group of the Year:	Rascal Flatts
Musician of the Year:	Randy Scruggs
Horizon Award:	Carrie Underwood
Musical Event of the Year:	"When I Get Where I'm Going" – Brad Paisley with Dolly Parton
Music Video of the Year:	"Believe" – Brooks & Dunn
Country Music Hall of Fame	Harold Bradley, Sonny James, George Strait

2007

Entertainer of the Year:	Kenny Chesney
Song of the Year:	"Give It Away" – Bill Anderson, Jamey Johnson and Buddy Cannon
Single of the Year:	"Before He Cheats" – Carrie Underwood
Album of the Year:	It Just Comes Natural – George Strait
Male Vocalist of the Year:	Brad Paisley
Female Vocalist of the Year:	Carrie Underwood
Vocal Duo of the Year:	Sugarland
Vocal Group of the Year:	Rascal Flatts
Musician of the Year:	Jerry Douglas
Horizon Award:	Taylor Swift
Musical Event of the Year:	"Find Out Who Your Friends Are" – Tracy Lawrence with Kenny Chesney and Tim McGraw
Music Video of the Year:	"Online" – Brad Paisley
Country Music Hall of Fame	Ralph Emery, Vince Gill, Mel Tillis

2008

Entertainer of the Year:	Kenny Chesney
Song of the Year:	"Stay" – Jennifer Nettles
Single of the Year:	"I Saw God Today" – George Strait
Album of the Year:	Troubadour – George Strait
Male Vocalist of the Year:	Brad Paisley
Female Vocalist of the Year:	Carrie Underwood
Vocal Duo of the Year:	Sugarland
Vocal Group of the Year:	Rascal Flatts
Musician of the Year:	Mac McAnally
New Artist of the Year:	Lady Antebellum
Musical Event of the Year:	"Gone, Gone, Gone (Done Moved On)" – Robert Plant and Alison Krauss
Music Video of the Year:	"Waitin' on a Woman" – Brad Paisley featuring Andy Griffith
Country Music Hall of Fame	Tom T. Hall, Emmylou Harris, Ernest V. "Pop" Stoneman, The Statler Brothers

2009

Entertainer of the Year:	Taylor Swift
Song of the Year:	"In Color" – Jamey Johnson, Lee Thomas Miller and James Otto
Single of the Year:	"I Run to You" – Lady Antebellum
Album of the Year:	Fearless – Taylor Swift
Male Vocalist of the Year:	Brad Paisley
Female Vocalist of the Year:	Taylor Swift
Vocal Duo of the Year:	Sugarland
Vocal Group of the Year:	Lady Antebellum
Musician of the Year:	Mac McAnally
New Artist of the Year:	Darius Rucker
Musical Event of the Year:	"Start a Band" – Brad Paisley and Keith Urban
Music Video of the Year:	"Love Story" – Taylor Swift
Country Music Hall of Fame	Roy Clark, Barbara Mandrell, Charlie McCoy

=== 2010s ===
2010

Entertainer of the Year:	Brad Paisley
Song of the Year:	"The House That Built Me" – Tom Douglas and Allen Shamblin
Single of the Year:	"Need You Now" – Lady Antebellum
Album of the Year:	Revolution – Miranda Lambert
Male Vocalist of the Year:	Blake Shelton
Female Vocalist of the Year:	Miranda Lambert
Vocal Duo of the Year:	Sugarland
Vocal Group of the Year:	Lady Antebellum
Musician of the Year:	Mac McAnally
New Artist of the Year:	Zac Brown Band
Musical Event of the Year:	"Hillbilly Bone" – Blake Shelton and Trace Adkins
Music Video of the Year:	"The House That Built Me" – Miranda Lambert
Country Music Hall of Fame	Jimmy Dean, Ferlin Husky, Billy Sherrill, Don Williams

2011

Entertainer of the Year:	Taylor Swift
Song of the Year:	"If I Die Young" – Kimberly Perry
Single of the Year:	"If I Die Young" – The Band Perry
Album of the Year:	My Kinda Party – Jason Aldean
Male Vocalist of the Year:	Blake Shelton
Female Vocalist of the Year:	Miranda Lambert
Vocal Duo of the Year:	Sugarland
Vocal Group of the Year:	Lady Antebellum
Musician of the Year:	Mac McAnally
New Artist of the Year:	The Band Perry
Musical Event of the Year:	"Don't You Wanna Stay" – Jason Aldean with Kelly Clarkson
Music Video of the Year:	"You and Tequila" – Kenny Chesney featuring Grace Potter
Country Music Hall of Fame	Bobby Braddock, Reba McEntire, Jean Shepard

2012

Entertainer of the Year:	Blake Shelton
Song of the Year:	"Over You" – Miranda Lambert and Blake Shelton
Single of the Year:	"Pontoon" – Little Big Town
Album of the Year:	Chief – Eric Church
Male Vocalist of the Year:	Blake Shelton
Female Vocalist of the Year:	Miranda Lambert
Vocal Duo of the Year:	Thompson Square
Vocal Group of the Year:	Little Big Town
Musician of the Year:	Mac McAnally
New Artist of the Year:	Hunter Hayes
Musical Event of the Year:	"Feel Like a Rock Star" – Kenny Chesney and Tim McGraw
Music Video of the Year:	"Red Solo Cup" – Toby Keith
Lifetime Achievement Award:	Willie Nelson
Country Music Hall of Fame	Garth Brooks, Hargus "Pig" Robbins, Connie Smith

2013

Entertainer of the Year:	George Strait
Song of the Year:	"I Drive Your Truck" – Jessi Alexander, Connie Harrington and Jimmy Yeary
Single of the Year:	"Cruise" – Florida Georgia Line
Album of the Year:	Based on a True Story... – Blake Shelton
Male Vocalist of the Year:	Blake Shelton
Female Vocalist of the Year:	Miranda Lambert
Vocal Duo of the Year:	Florida Georgia Line
Vocal Group of the Year:	Little Big Town
Musician of the Year:	Mac McAnally
New Artist of the Year:	Kacey Musgraves
Musical Event of the Year:	"Highway Don't Care" – Tim McGraw with Taylor Swift and Keith Urban
Music Video of the Year:	"Highway Don't Care" – Tim McGraw with Taylor Swift and Keith Urban
Pinnacle Award:	Taylor Swift
Lifetime Achievement Award:	Kenny Rogers
Country Music Hall of Fame	Bobby Bare, Cowboy Jack Clement, Kenny Rogers

2014

Entertainer of the Year:	Luke Bryan
Song of the Year:	"Follow Your Arrow" – Kacey Musgraves, Shane McAnally, Brandy Clark
Single of the Year:	"Automatic" – Miranda Lambert
Album of the Year:	Platinum – Miranda Lambert
Male Vocalist of the Year:	Blake Shelton
Female Vocalist of the Year:	Miranda Lambert
Vocal Duo of the Year:	Florida Georgia Line
Vocal Group of the Year:	Little Big Town
Musician of the Year:	Mac McAnally
New Artist of the Year:	Brett Eldredge
Musical Event of the Year:	"We Were Us" – Keith Urban with Miranda Lambert
Music Video of the Year:	"Drunk on a Plane" – Dierks Bentley
Irving Waugh Award of Excellence:	Vince Gill
Country Music Hall of Fame	Hank Cochran, Ronnie Milsap, Mac Wiseman

2015

Entertainer of the Year:	Luke Bryan
Song of the Year:	"Girl Crush" – Liz Rose, Lori McKenna, Hillary Lindsey
Single of the Year:	"Girl Crush" – Little Big Town
Album of the Year:	Traveller – Chris Stapleton
Male Vocalist of the Year:	Chris Stapleton
Female Vocalist of the Year:	Miranda Lambert
Vocal Duo of the Year:	Florida Georgia Line
Vocal Group of the Year:	Little Big Town
Musician of the Year:	Mac McAnally
New Artist of the Year:	Chris Stapleton
Musical Event of the Year:	"Raise 'Em Up" – Keith Urban with Eric Church
Music Video of the Year:	"Girl in a Country Song" – Maddie & Tae
Lifetime Achievement Award:	Johnny Cash
Country Music Hall of Fame	Jim Ed Brown And The Browns, Grady Martin, Oak Ridge Boys

2016
Main Article: 50th Annual Country Music Association Awards

Entertainer of the Year:	Garth Brooks
Song of the Year:	"Humble and Kind" – Lori McKenna
Single of the Year:	"Die a Happy Man" – Thomas Rhett
Album of the Year:	Mr. Misunderstood –Eric Church
Male Vocalist of the Year:	Chris Stapleton
Female Vocalist of the Year:	Carrie Underwood
Vocal Duo of the Year:	Brothers Osborne
Vocal Group of the Year:	Little Big Town
Musician of the Year:	Dann Huff
New Artist of the Year:	Maren Morris
Musical Event of the Year:	"Different For Girls" - Dierks Bentley with Elle King
Music Video of the Year:	"Fire Away" – Chris Stapleton
Lifetime Achievement Award:	Dolly Parton
Pinnacle Award:	Kenny Chesney
Country Music Hall of Fame	Fred Foster, Charlie Daniels, Randy Travis

2017
Main Article: 51st Annual Country Music Association Awards

Entertainer of the Year:	Garth Brooks
Song of the Year:	"Better Man" – Taylor Swift
Single of the Year:	"Blue Ain't Your Color" – Keith Urban
Album of the Year:	From A Room: Volume 1 – Chris Stapleton
Male Vocalist of the Year:	Chris Stapleton
Female Vocalist of the Year:	Miranda Lambert
Duo of the Year:	Brothers Osborne
Group of the Year:	Little Big Town
New Artist of the Year	Jon Pardi
Vocal Event of the Year:	"Funny How Time Slips Away" - Glen Campbell and Willie Nelson
Music Video of the Year:	"It Ain't My Fault" - Brothers Osborne
Musician of the Year	Mac McAnally

2018
Main Article: 52nd Annual Country Music Association Awards

Entertainer of the Year	Keith Urban
Male Vocalist of the Year	Chris Stapleton
Female Vocalist of the Year	Carrie Underwood
Song of the Year	Mike Henderson and Chris Stapleton - "Broken Halos"
Single of the Year	Chris Stapleton - "Broken Halos"
Album of the Year	Kacey Musgraves - Golden Hour
Vocal Duo of the Year	Brothers Osborne
Vocal Group of the Year	Old Dominion
New Artist of the Year	Luke Combs
Vocal Event of the Year	David Lee Murphy duet with Kenny Chesney - "Everything's Gonna Be Alright"
Music Video of The Year	Thomas Rhett - "Marry Me"
Musician of the Year	Mac McAnally

2019
Main Article: 53rd Annual Country Music Association Awards

Entertainer of the Year	Garth Brooks
Male Vocalist of the Year	Luke Combs
Female Vocalist of the Year	Kacey Musgraves
Song of the Year	Luke Combs, Wyatt B. Durrette III and Robert Williford - "Beautiful Crazy"
Single of the Year	Blake Shelton - "God's Country"
Album of the Year	"Girl" - Maren Morris
Vocal Duo of the Year	Dan + Shay
Vocal Group of the Year	Old Dominion
New Artist of the Year	Ashley McBryde
Vocal Event of the Year	"Old Town Road (Remix)" - Lil Nas X and Billy Ray Cyrus
Music Video of the Year	"Rainbow" - Kacey Musgraves
Musician of the Year	Jenee Fleenor

=== 2020s ===
2020

Entertainer of the Year	Eric Church
Male Vocalist of the Year	Luke Combs
Female Vocalist of the Year	Maren Morris
Song of the Year	Maren Morris, Jimmy Robbins, and Laura Veltz — "The Bones"
Single of the Year	Maren Morris — "The Bones"
Album of the Year	What You See Is What You Get — Luke Combs
Vocal Duo of the Year	Dan + Shay
Vocal Group of the Year	Old Dominion
New Artist of the Year	Morgan Wallen
Vocal Event of the Year	"I Hope You're Happy Now" — Carly Pearce and Lee Brice
Music Video of the Year	"Bluebird" — Miranda Lambert
Musician of the Year	Jenee Fleenor

2021

Entertainer of the Year	Luke Combs
Male Vocalist of the Year	Chris Stapleton
Female Vocalist of the Year	Carly Pearce
Song of the Year	"Starting Over" — Chris Stapleton, Mike Henderson
Single of the Year	"Starting Over" — Chris Stapleton
Album of the Year	Starting Over — Chris Stapleton
Vocal Duo of the Year	Brothers Osborne
Vocal Group of the Year	Old Dominion
New Artist of the Year	Jimmie Allen
Vocal Event of the Year	"Half of My Hometown" — Kelsea Ballerini and Kenny Chesney
Music Video of the Year	"Half of My Hometown" — Kelsea Ballerini and Kenny Chesney
Musician of the Year	Jenee Fleenor

2022

Entertainer of the Year	Luke Combs
Male Vocalist of the Year	Chris Stapleton
Female Vocalist of the Year	Lainey Wilson
Song of the Year	"Buy Dirt" - Jacob Davis, Jordan Davis, Josh Jenkins, Matt Jenkins
Single of the Year	"'Til You Can't" - Cody Johnson
Album of the Year	Growin' Up - Luke Combs
Vocal Duo of the Year	Brothers Osborne
Vocal Group of the Year	Old Dominion
New Artist of the Year	Lainey Wilson
Musical Event of the Year	"Never Wanted to Be That Girl" - Carly Pearce & Ashley McBryde
Music Video of the Year	"'Til You Can't" - Cody Johnson
Musician of the Year	Jenee Fleenor

2023

Entertainer of the Year	Lainey Wilson
Male Vocalist of the Year	Chris Stapleton
Female Vocalist of the Year	Lainey Wilson
Song of the Year	"Fast Car" - Tracy Chapman
Single of the Year	"Fast Car" - Luke Combs
Album of the Year	Bell Bottom Country - Lainey Wilson
Vocal Duo of the Year	Brothers Osborne
Vocal Group of the Year	Old Dominion
New Artist of the Year	Jelly Roll
Musical Event of the Year	"Wait in the Truck" - HARDY & Lainey Wilson
Music Video of the Year	"Wait in the Truck" - HARDY & Lainey Wilson
Musician of the Year	Jenee Fleenor

2024

Entertainer of the Year	Morgan Wallen
Male Vocalist of the Year	Chris Stapleton
Female Vocalist of the Year	Lainey Wilson
Song of the Year	"White Horse" - Chris Stapleton
Single of the Year	"White Horse" - Chris Stapleton
Album of the Year	Leather - Cody Johnson
Vocal Duo of the Year	Brooks & Dunn
Vocal Group of the Year	Old Dominion
New Artist of the Year	Megan Moroney
Musical Event of the Year	"You Look Like You Love Me" - Ella Langley (ft. Riley Green)
Music Video of the Year	“Wildflowers and Wild Horses” - Lainey Wilson
Musician of the Year	Charlie Worsham

2025

Entertainer of the Year	Lainey Wilson
Male Vocalist of the Year	Cody Johnson
Female Vocalist of the Year	Lainey Wilson
Song of the Year	"You Look Like You Love Me" - Ella Langley (ft. Riley Green)
Single of the Year	"You Look Like You Love Me" - Ella Langley (ft. Riley Green)
Album of the Year	Whirlwind - Lainey Wilson
Vocal Duo of the Year	Brooks & Dunn
Vocal Group of the Year	The Red Clay Strays
New Artist of the Year	Zach Top
Musical Event of the Year	"Pour Me A Drink" - Post Malone (ft. Blake Shelton)
Music Video of the Year	"You Look Like You Love Me" - Ella Langley (ft. Riley Green)
Musician of the Year	Paul Franklin

2026

Entertainer of the Year	Ella Langley
Male Vocalist of the Year	Chris Stapleton
Female Vocalist of the Year	Ella Langley
Song of the Year	“Choosin’ Texas” — Ella Langley
Single of the Year	“Choosin’ Texas” — Ella Langley
Album of the Year	Dandelion — Ella Langley
Vocal Duo of the Year	Brooks & Dunn
Vocal Group of the Year	The Red Clay Strays
New Artist of the Year	Stephen Wilson Jr.
Musical Event of the Year	“McArthur” — Hardy, Eric Church, Morgan Wallen, and Tim McGraw
Music Video of the Year	“Choosin’ Texas” — Ella Langley
Musician of the Year	Charlie Worsham

== See also ==
- List of Academy of Country Music Awards ceremonies
