= Academy of Country Music Award for New Artist of the Year =

American country music award

- Country: United States
- Presented by: Academy of Country Music
- First award: 2004
- Currently held by: Cole Swindell (50th)

The Academy of Country Music Award for New Artist of the Year is a new artist category presented at the Academy of Country Music Awards. This award was seen as a substitute for the ACM awards for New Male Vocalist, New Female Vocalist, and New Vocal Duo or Group. This award was first awarded in 2004 to Dierks Bentley, when this award was known as the Top New Artist of the Year.

From 2004 to 2010, the award was known as the Top New Artist of the Year.

And from 2011 to 2015, the award was known as the New Artist of the Year.

This award is given to the new artist who has gained initial fame or significantly greater recognition during the promotion of a debut or sophomore album within the eligibility period. The artist must have released a single that reached the Top 40 on Billboard’s Hot Country Songs or the Mediabase Country charts. Any albums self-released through an independent label the artist owns and operates may not be counted as a debut or sophomore album, unless it produces a Top 40 single reported by Billboard’s Hot Country Songs or Mediabase Country charts.

== Winners and nominees ==
In the following tables, the years correspond to the date of the ceremony. Artists are eligible based on their work of the previous calendar year. Entries with a blue ribbon next to the artist's name have won the award; those with a white background are the nominees on the short-list.

=== 2010s ===
| Year | Winner | Nominees |
|---|---|---|
| 2015 | Cole Swindell | Dan + Shay; Sam Hunt; Thomas Rhett |
| 2014 | Justin Moore | Brett Eldredge; Kip Moore |
| 2013 | Florida Georgia Line | Brantley Gilbert; Jana Kramer |
| 2012 | Scotty McCreery | Hunter Hayes; Brantley Gilbert |
| 2011 | The Band Perry | Eric Church |
| 2010 | Luke Bryan | Gloriana; Joey + Rory |

=== 2000s ===
| Year | Winner | Nominees |
|---|---|---|
| 2009 | Julianne Hough | Jake Owen; Zac Brown Band |
| 2005 | Gretchen Wilson | Big & Rich; Josh Gracin; Julie Roberts; Josh Turner |
| 2004 | Dierks Bentley | Pat Green; Buddy Jewell; Josh Turner; Jimmy Wayne |
