= Bobby Durham (country musician) =

American singer-songwriter

- Origin: United States
- Genres: Country music
- Labels: Capitol Records, Hightone Records
- Website: Bobby Durham Official Website

Bobby Durham (born 1942 ) is an American country musician associated with the Bakersfield sound. His hits include Do You Still Drink Margaritas; Playboy; Let’s Start a Rumor Today and the classic song penned by Merle Haggard My Past Is Present.

== Past ==
Durham first performed professionally at age 11, appearing on Billy Mize's TV show. He performed solo and occasionally with his brother Wayne on local shows such as Town Hall Party, Trading Post, and Cliffie Stone's Hometown Jamboree and in 1953 he joined Cousin Ebb's Squirrel Shooters, which was the house band for the Pumpkin Center Barn Dance. Following this he played with Jolly Judy and the Go-Daddies and with Gene Davis's Palomino Riders.

=== 1960s ===
In the 1960s Durham signed to Capitol Records and released several singles, including his take on the Merle Haggard song "My Past Is Present". In 1965 he was nominated for Most Promising Male Vocalist for the Academy of Country Music Awards and again in 1966 as Most Promising Vocal Group for a duet recording he did with Jeanie O'Neal. In 1968, he released a self-titled album, which was produced by Chet Atkins.

Later Bobby joined The Crickets, onetime backing band for Buddy Holly; He would spend the next five years touring with them.

=== 1970s & 1980s ===
After his tenure with the Crickets, Durham began working in Las Vegas in 1972 and performed there for 11 years off and on with his brother Wayne as The Durham Brothers, He also operated a nightclub in Colorado Springs from 1975-78.

In 1983 he returned to Bakersfield, California to take care of his family. The Durham Brothers released an album that featured the song Do You Still Drink Margaritas, the song became a hit for them and reached number 2 billing in the Australian charts . They were invited to play on the bill at The Grand Ole Opry in 1984. They took their Mother Adell Durham to the performance. "That was the thrill of my lifetime," Durham says. "I just wish my daddy had been around to see it."

In 1987 Bobby signed a deal with Hightone Records and released Where I Grew Up. Distribution of the album was also picked up in the UK by Demon Records where the album went Gold. The album featured the songs Playboy and Let's Start A Rumor Today the later of which also appears as track 1 on disc 3 of the Hightone Records box set The Hightone Records Story.

== Present ==
Bobby has recorded his latest CD Last of the Golden Era, which released in 2010. He continues to make appearances including at Buck Owens's Crystal Palace with his band The Durham Band. August 24, 2010 was officially marked "Bobby Durham Day" in Bakersfield, CA for his contributions to the Bakersfield Sound; they held a celebration and concert at the Buck Owens's Crystal Palace.

== Awards and nominations ==
=== Gold Records ===
- 1987 Where I Grew Up (Hightone Records; Demon Records)

=== Academy of Country Music Awards ===
- 1965 Most Promising Male Vocalist * Nomination
- 1966 Most Promising Vocal Group - Bobby Durham & Jeanie O'Neal * Nomination

== Singles ==
- 1964 My Past Is Present (Capitol Records)
- 1964 Queen of Snob Hill (Capitol Records)
- 1965 It’s Too Much Like Lonesome (Capitol Records)
- 1965 So Welcome to the Club (Capitol Records)
- 1965 Let the Sad Times Roll On (Capitol Records)
- 1965 Let That Be a Lesson to You, Heartache (Capitol Records)
- 1966 Home Is Where I Hang My Head (Capitol Records)
- 1966 Why Don’t You Just Be You (Capitol Records)
- 1987 Playboy (Hightone Records)
- 1987 Let's Start A Rumor Today (Hightone Records)

== Discography ==
- 1968 Bobby Durham (Capitol Records)
- 1987 Where I Grew Up (Hightone Records)
- 1987 Where I Grew Up (UK Release) (Demon Records)
- 2007 Greatest Hits (Songs from the early 80s) (Independent)
- 2007 My Past Is Present (Songs from 1964–1968) (Independent)
- 2010 Last Of The Golden Era (Independent)

=== Other appearances ===
- 1983 The Durham Brothers
- 2006 The Hightone Records Story (Box Set) (Hightone Records)
