= Don Williams discography =

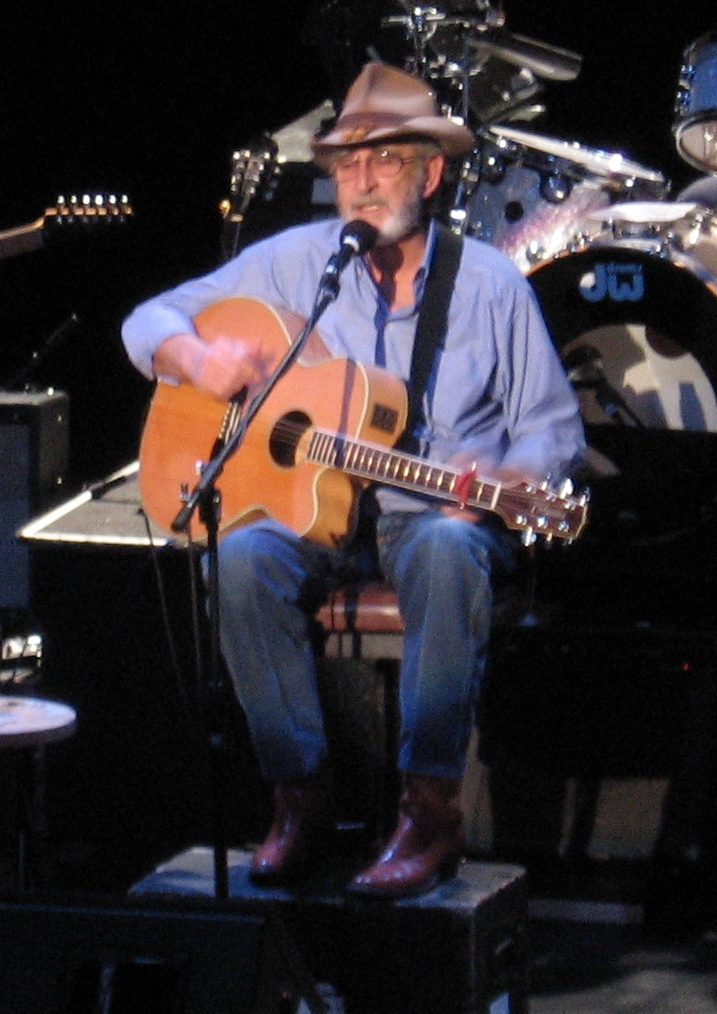
- Don Williams performing in Winnipeg, Manitoba, on November 5, 2006
- Studio albums: 26
- Live albums: 2
- Compilation albums: 13
- Singles: 62
- Music videos: 7
- #1 Singles: 21

This is a detailed discography for American country music singer Don Williams that includes information on all of his studio albums, singles, greatest hits compilations and live albums. Don Williams was active from 1967 until his death in 2017. He was one of the best-selling male vocalists in country music in the 1970s and early 1980s.

In March 2026, Williams' son, Tim Williams, announced the first collection of new material and the first posthumous release for Williams since he died in 2017, with Epilogue: The Cellar Tapes, which is to be released on May 29, 2026.

== Studio albums ==
=== 1970s ===
Title	Album details	Peak chart positions			
Title	Album details	US Country	US	AUS	CAN Country
Don Williams Volume One	Release date: June 1973; Label: JMI Records; Formats: LP	5	—	—	—
Don Williams Volume Two	Release date: January 1974; Label: JMI Records; Formats: LP	13	—	—	—
Don Williams Vol. III	Release date: September 25, 1974; Label: ABC/Dot Records; Formats: LP	3	—	—	—
You're My Best Friend	Release date: April 1975; Label: ABC/Dot Records; Formats: LP, cassette	5	—	—	—
Harmony	Release date: April 5, 1976; Label: ABC/Dot Records; Formats: LP, cassette	1	—	—	—
Visions	Release date: January 17, 1977; Label: ABC/Dot Records; Formats: LP, cassette	4	—	98	—
Country Boy	Release date: September 13, 1977; Label: ABC/Dot Records; Formats: LP, cassette	9	—	—	11
Expressions	Release date: August 23, 1978; Label: ABC/Dot Records; Formats: LP, cassette	2	161	—	1
Portrait	Release date: October 19, 1979; Label: MCA Records; Formats: LP, cassette	11	—	—	—
"—" denotes releases that did not chart

=== 1980s ===
Title	Album details	Peak chart positions				Certifications (sales threshold)
Title	Album details	US Country	US	AUS	CAN Country	Certifications (sales threshold)
I Believe in You	Release date: August 4, 1980; Label: MCA Records; Formats: LP, cassette	2	57	47	3	CAN: Gold; US: Platinum
Especially for You	Release date: June 26, 1981; Label: MCA Records; Formats: LP, cassette	5	109	—	—	
Listen to the Radio	Release date: March 26, 1982; Label: MCA Records; Formats: LP, cassette	6	166	—	—	
Yellow Moon	Release date: March 25, 1983; Label: MCA Records; Formats: LP, cassette	12	44	—	—	
Cafe Carolina	Release date: May 14, 1984; Label: MCA Records; Formats: LP, cassette	13	—	—	1	
New Moves	Release date: January 17, 1986; Label: Capitol Records; Formats: LP, cassette	29	—	—	—	
Traces	Release date: October 14, 1987; Label: Capitol Records; Formats: CD, LP, cassette	—	—	—	—	
One Good Well	Release date: April 28, 1989; Label: RCA Nashville; Formats: CD, LP, cassette	54	—	—	—	
"—" denotes releases that did not chart

=== 1990s ===
Title	Album details	Peak positions	
Title	Album details	US Country	UK Country
True Love	Release date: August 7, 1990; Label: RCA Nashville; Formats: CD, cassette	56	—
Currents	Release date: March 10, 1992; Label: RCA Nashville; Formats: CD, cassette	—	—
Borrowed Tales	Release date: August 8, 1995; Label: American Harvest Records; Formats: CD, cassette	—	3
Flatlands	Release date: October 8, 1996; Label: American Harvest Records; Formats: CD, cassette	—	4
I Turn the Page	Release date: October 27, 1998; Label: Giant Records; Formats: CD, cassette	69	11
"—" denotes releases that did not chart

=== 2000s–2020s ===
Title	Album details	Peak chart positions		
Title	Album details	US Country	US	UK Country
My Heart to You	Release date: April 27, 2004; Label: Vanguard Records; Formats: CD	—	—	10
And So It Goes	Release date: June 19, 2012; Label: Sugar Hill Records; Formats: CD, music download	20	100	1
Reflections	Release date: March 11, 2014; Label: Sugar Hill Records; Formats: CD, music download	19	124	1
Epilogue: The Cellar Tapes	Release date: May 29, 2026; Label: Craft Recordings; Formats: CD, LP, music download	To be released		

== Live albums ==
Title	Album details
An Evening with Don Williams: Best Of Live	Release date: May 27, 1994; Label: American Harvest Records; Formats: CD, cassette
Live Greatest Hits, Volume Two	Release date: April 17, 2001; Label: Row Music Group; Formats: CD
Don Williams in Ireland	Release date: April 15, 2016; Label: Don Williams Music Group; Formats: CD, LP

== Compilation albums ==
Title	Album details	Peak chart positions			Certifications (sales threshold)
Title	Album details	US Country	AUS	CAN Country	Certifications (sales threshold)
Greatest Hits, Volume One	Release date: September 22, 1975; Label: ABC/Dot Records; Formats: LP, cassette	5	—	—	
The Best of Don Williams, Volume II	Release date: April 23, 1979; Label: ABC/Dot Records; Formats: LP, cassette	7	—	2	CAN: Gold; US: Gold
Now & Then	Release date: 1982; Label: J&B Records; Formats: CD, LP, cassette	—	31	—	
The Best of Don Williams, Volume III	Release date: February 13, 1984; Label: MCA Records; Formats: CD, LP, cassette	18	—	—	US: Gold
Greatest Hits Volume IV	Release date: November 11, 1985; Label: MCA Records; Formats: CD, LP, cassette	60	—	—	
Lovers and Best Friends	Release date: September 22, 1986; Label: MCA Records; Formats: LP, cassette	—	—	—	
20 Greatest Hits	Release date: February 16, 1987; Label: MCA Records; Formats: CD, LP, cassette	14	—	—	
Greatest Country Hits	Release date: September 10, 1990; Label: Curb Records; Formats: CD, cassette	—	—	—	
The Best of Don Williams	Release date: May 23, 1995; Label: RCA Nashville; Formats: CD, cassette	—	—	—	
20th Century Masters: The Millennium Collection	Release date: May 9, 2000; Label: MCA Nashville; Formats: CD	74	—	—	
Gold	Release date: October 17, 2000; Label: Hip-O Records; Formats: CD	—	—	—	
20th Century Masters: The Millennium Collection, Vol. 2	Release date: September 25, 2001; Label: MCA Nashville; Formats: CD	—	—	—	
The Definitive Collection	Release date: June 22, 2004; Label: MCA Nashville; Formats: CD	48	—	—	
Icon: Don Williams	Release date: August 31, 2010; Label: MCA Nashville; Formats: CD	43	—	—	
"—" denotes releases that did not chart

== Singles ==
=== 1970s ===
Year	Single	Peak chart positions					Album
Year	Single	US Country	US Bubbling	AUS	CAN Country	UK	Album
1973	"The Shelter of Your Eyes"	14	—	—	—	—	Don Williams Volume One
1973	"Come Early Morning"	12	—	—	—	—	Don Williams Volume One
1973	"Amanda"	33	—	65	—	—	Don Williams Volume One
1974	"Atta Way to Go"	13	—	—	57	—	Don Williams Volume Two
1974	"We Should Be Together"	5	—	—	—	—	Don Williams Volume Two
1974	"Down the Road I Go"	62	—	—	50	—	Don Williams Volume Two
1974	"I Wouldn't Want to Live If You Didn't Love Me"	1	—	—	10	—	Don Williams Vol. III
1974	"The Ties That Bind"	4	—	—	2	—	Don Williams Vol. III
1975	"You're My Best Friend"	1	—	50	1	35	You're My Best Friend
1975	"(Turn Out the Light And) Love Me Tonight"	1	—	—	5	—	You're My Best Friend
1975	"'Til the Rivers All Run Dry"	1	—	—	—	—	Harmony
1976	"Say It Again"	1	—	—	4	—	Harmony
1976	"I Recall a Gypsy Woman"	—	—	—	—	13	Don Williams Volume One
1976	"She Never Knew Me"	2	3	—	2	—	Harmony
1977	"Some Broken Hearts Never Mend"	1	8	—	6	—	Visions
1977	"I'm Just a Country Boy"	1	10	—	1	57 (Note: Chart position is from the official UK "Breakers List".)	Country Boy
1978	"I've Got a Winner in You"	7	—	—	10	—	Country Boy
1978	"Rake and Ramblin' Man"	3	—	—	2	—	Country Boy
1978	"Tulsa Time"	1	6	—	1	—	Expressions
1979	"Lay Down Beside Me"	3	—	88	2	—	Expressions
1979	"It Must Be Love"	1	—	—	2	—	Expressions
1979	"Love Me Over Again"	1	—	—	1	—	Portrait
"—" denotes releases that did not chart

=== 1980s ===
Year	Single	Peak chart positions						Album
Year	Single	US Country	US	US AC	AUS	CAN Country	CAN AC	Album
1980	"Good Ole Boys Like Me"	2	—	—	—	3	—	Portrait
1980	"I Believe in You"	1	24	8	20	1	7	I Believe in You
1981	"Falling Again"	6	—	39	—	3	—	I Believe in You
1981	"Miracles"	4	—	32	—	2	—	Especially for You
1981	"Lord, I Hope This Day Is Good"	1	—	—	—	1	—	Especially for You
1982	"Listen to the Radio"	3	—	—	—	1	—	Listen to the Radio
1982	"Mistakes"	3	—	—	—	3	—	Listen to the Radio
1982	"If Hollywood Don't Need You (Honey I Still Do)"	1	—	—	—	1	—	Listen to the Radio
1983	"Love Is on a Roll"	1	—	—	—	1	—	Yellow Moon
1983	"Nobody but You"	2	—	—	—	1	—	Yellow Moon
1983	"Stay Young"	1	—	—	—	3	—	Yellow Moon
1984	"That's the Thing About Love"	1	—	—	—	1	—	Cafe Carolina
1984	"Maggie's Dream"	11	—	—	—	13	—	Cafe Carolina
1985	"Walkin' a Broken Heart"	2	—	—	—	3	—	Cafe Carolina
1985	"It's Time for Love"	20	—	—	—	49	—	Cafe Carolina
1986	"We've Got a Good Fire Goin'"	3	—	—	—	2	—	New Moves
1986	"Heartbeat in the Darkness"	1	—	—	—	2	—	New Moves
1986	"Then It's Love"	3	—	—	—	4	—	New Moves
1987	"Señorita"	9	—	—	—	12	—	New Moves
1987	"I'll Never Be in Love Again"	4	—	—	—	15	—	New Moves
1987	"I Wouldn't Be a Man"	9	—	—	—	7	—	Traces
1988	"Another Place, Another Time"	5	—	—	—	—	—	Traces
1988	"Desperately"	7	—	—	—	5	—	Traces
1989	"Old Coyote Town"	5	—	—	—	2	—	Traces
1989	"One Good Well"	4	—	—	—	3	—	One Good Well
1989	"I've Been Loved by the Best"	4	—	—	—	11	—	One Good Well
"—" denotes releases that did not chart

=== 1990s–2010s ===
Year	Single	Peak chart positions		Album
Year	Single	US Country	CAN Country	Album
1990	"Just as Long as I Have You"	4	11	One Good Well
1990	"Maybe That's All It Takes"	22	47	One Good Well
1990	"Back in My Younger Days"	2	1	True Love
1991	"True Love"	4	5	True Love
1991	"Lord Have Mercy on a Country Boy"	7	17	True Love
1992	"It's Who You Love"	73	—	Currents
1992	"Too Much Love"	72	—	Currents
1992	"Catfish Bates"	—	—	Currents
1995	"Fever"	—	—	Borrowed Tales
1995	"Games People Play"	—	—	Borrowed Tales
1998	"Cracker Jack Diamond"	—	87	I Turn the Page
1998	"Pretty Little Baby Child"	—	—	—N/a
2004	"My Heart to You"	—	—	My Heart to You
2012	"I Just Come Here for the Music" (with Alison Krauss)	—	—	And So It Goes
2014	"I'll Be Here in the Morning"	—	—	Reflections
"—" denotes releases that did not chart

== Other singles ==
=== Featured singles ===
Year	Single	Artist	Peak chart positions		Album
Year	Single	Artist	US Country	CAN Country	Album
1981	"If I Needed You"	Emmylou Harris	3	1	Cimarron

=== Promotional singles ===
Year	Single	Peak positions	Album
Year	Single	US Country	Album
1980	"Could You Ever Really Love a Poor Boy"	97	—N/a

== Music videos ==
Year	Video	Director
1986	"Heartbeat in the Darkness"	Sherman Halsey
1989	"I've Been Loved by the Best"	Phil Olsman
1995	"Fever"	Bob Gabrielsen
2004	"My Heart to You"	John Donegan
2012	"Imagine That" (with Keith Urban)	David McClister
2014	"I'll Be Here in the Morning"	Bill Filipiak
2014	"Sing Me Back Home"	Bill Filipiak

== See also ==
- Pozo-Seco Singers
- JMI Records
- Bob McDill
- Allen Reynolds
