= Epilogue: The Cellar Tapes =

Studio album by Don Williams
- Released: May 29, 2026
- Recorded: 1979–1984
- Genre: Country
- Length: 35:11
- Label: Craft
- Producer: Garth Fundis; Don Williams

Don Williams chronology
Reflections (2014)	Epilogue: The Cellar Tapes (2026)

Epilogue: The Cellar Tapes is the twenty-sixth studio album by American country music artist Don Williams. It was released on May 29, 2026, via Craft Recordings.

Coming almost a decade after Williams' death in 2017, Epilogue: The Cellar Tapes marks the first posthumous release of all-new material and his first album overall since 2014.

== Background ==
Epilogue: The Cellar Tapes consists of 12 songs recorded between 1979 and 1984, and found in the basement of the Williams family home in Tennessee in 2022. Notable songs recorded during that stretch include "Good Ole Boys Like Me", "It Must Be Love", "I Believe in You", "Lord, I Hope This Day Is Good", and "Love Is on a Roll".

The album was announced in late March 2026, with Williams' longtime co-producer Garth Fundis serving as the producer. Williams' son, Tim Williams, serves as the album's executive producer. Other longtime collaborators of Williams returned to clean up the songs, including Joe Allen on bass, Kenny Malone on drums and congas, Charles Cochran on piano, organ, and string arrangements, Lloyd Green on steel guitar, and Jimmy Colvard, Dave Kirby, and Billy Sanford all on guitar.

Alongside the album's announcement, the lead promotional single, "Leaving Louisiana in the Broad Daylight", which was previously released by The Oak Ridge Boys and Emmylou Harris, was released.

On the songs, Tim Williams said:

"These songs Dad recorded are—as music can be—a time machine. Obviously, I grew up always hearing what he was doing. He'd bring home three to four songs at a time from the album he was working on at different stages. In working on this project, we tried above all to stay true to how Dad approached production, made much easier for me with Garth's involvement, and then just to stay out of the way of the music."

== Track listing ==
Epilogue: The Cellar Tapes track listing
No.	Title	Writer(s)	Length
1.	"Try Me Again"	Layng Martine Jr.	2:55
2.	"You Came True"	John Jarrard; J. D. Martin	2:54
3.	"I'm the One (Alternate Version)"	Wayland Holyfield; Don Williams	3:04
4.	"Leaving Louisiana in the Broad Daylight"	Donivan Cowart; Rodney Crowell	3:39
5.	"I Wish I Was Crazy Again"	Bob McDill	4:00
6.	"I'm in Love for My Last Time"		2:56
7.	"Spinning Around"		2:42
8.	"A Matter of Time"		2:27
9.	"I'm the One (Original Version)"	Holyfield; Williams	2:57
10.	"How Can I Miss What I Never Had"	McDill	2:43
11.	"Goldy's Gone from Golden"	Dave Kirby	2:23
12.	"Growing On Me"	Richard Beresford; Jennifer Kimball	2:31
Total length:			35:11

== Charts ==
Chart performance for Epilogue: The Cellar Tapes
Chart (2026)	Peak position
Scottish Albums (OCC)	80
UK Albums Sales (OCC)	87
UK Americana Albums (OCC)	17
UK Country Albums (OCC)	7
US Top Album Sales (Billboard)	33
