= List of Hot Country Singles number ones of 1980 =

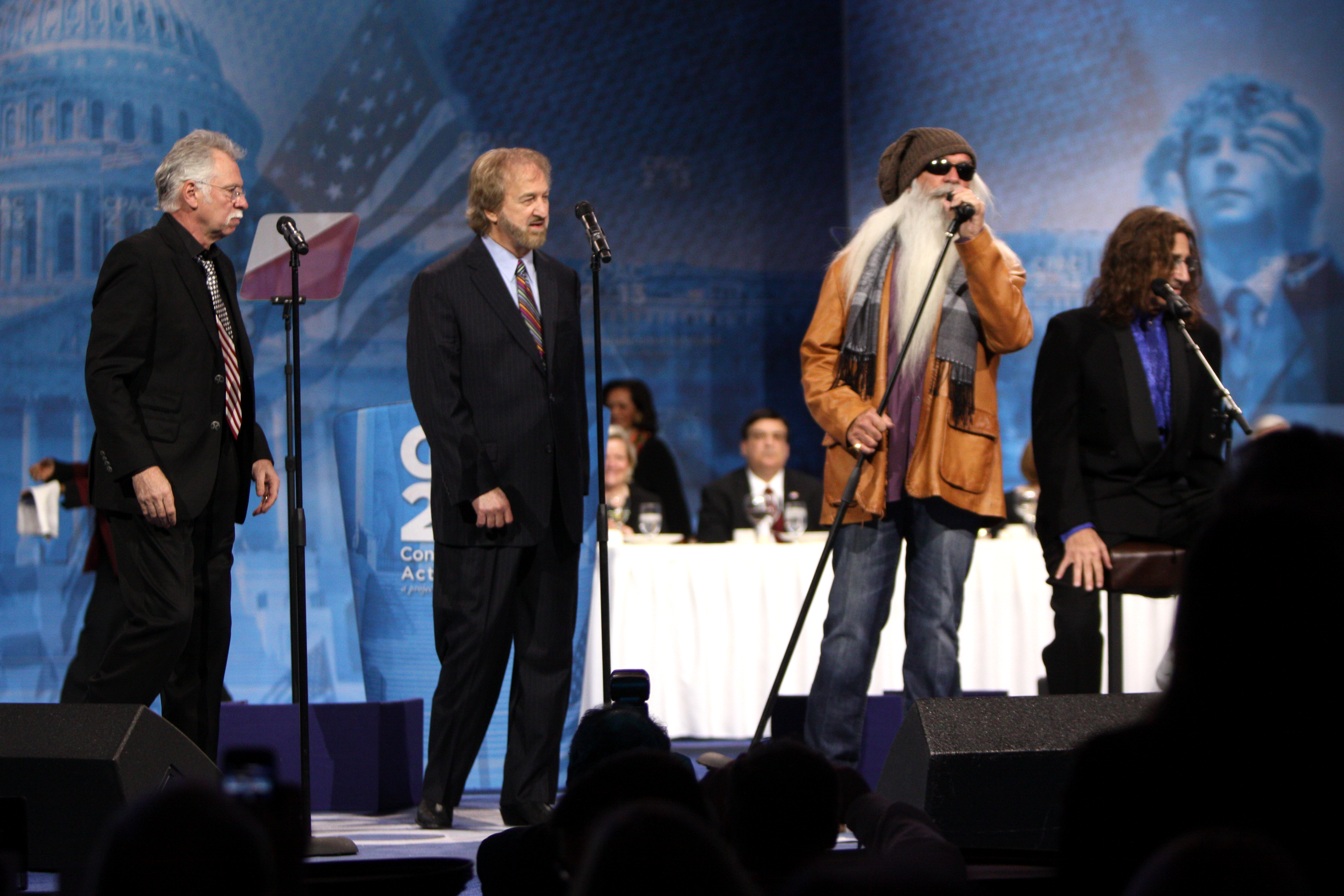
The Oak Ridge Boys (pictured in 2013) had two number one singles in 1980.

Hot Country Songs is a chart that ranks the top-performing country music songs in the United States, published by Billboard magazine. In 1980, 43 different singles topped the chart, then published under the title Hot Country Singles, in 52 issues of the magazine, based on playlists submitted by country music radio stations and sales reports submitted by stores.

In the first issue of Billboard of 1980, Kenny Rogers moved into the number one position with "Coward of the County", his fifth consecutive country number one. The song went on to tie for the year's longest unbroken run at the top with Ronnie Milsap's double A-sided single "My Heart" / "Silent Night (After the Fight)" and "Lookin' for Love" by Johnny Lee. All three singles spent three consecutive weeks at number one. Rogers returned to the top of the country chart later in the year with "Lady", which was a crossover success, also reaching number one on Billboard's pop chart, the Hot 100. Rogers was experiencing a lengthy spell of success with smooth sounds which appealed equally to country and pop audiences and established him as a major star in both genres. Milsap had the most country number ones of any artist in 1980, taking four different singles to the top spot, followed by Mickey Gilley with three. Milsap's total of six weeks at number one was the most achieved by an individual act.

Cristy Lane reached number one for the first and only time in June with "One Day at a Time". Another first-time chart topper was the actor Clint Eastwood, who duetted with Merle Haggard on the song "Bar Room Buddies" for the soundtrack of his film Bronco Billy, in which Haggard made a cameo appearance. Eastwood had made occasional previous forays into music, including the full-length album Rawhide's Clint Eastwood Sings Cowboy Favorites in 1963, but "Bar Room Buddies" was his first ever Hot Country hit. Ronnie Milsap's number-one song "Cowboys and Clowns" also featured in Bronco Billy. A song from a film soundtrack also gave Johnny Lee his first number one in 1980, as "Lookin' for Love" was recorded for the film Urban Cowboy. Mickey Gilley's chart-topping version of "Stand by Me" was taken from the same film, in which Gilley himself appeared, as was "Could I Have This Dance" by Canadian country artist Anne Murray. The final artist to debut at number one in 1980 was Razzy Bailey with "Loving Up a Storm" in October. Johnny Lee's second chart-topper of the year, "One in a Million", was the final number one of the year.

== Chart history ==
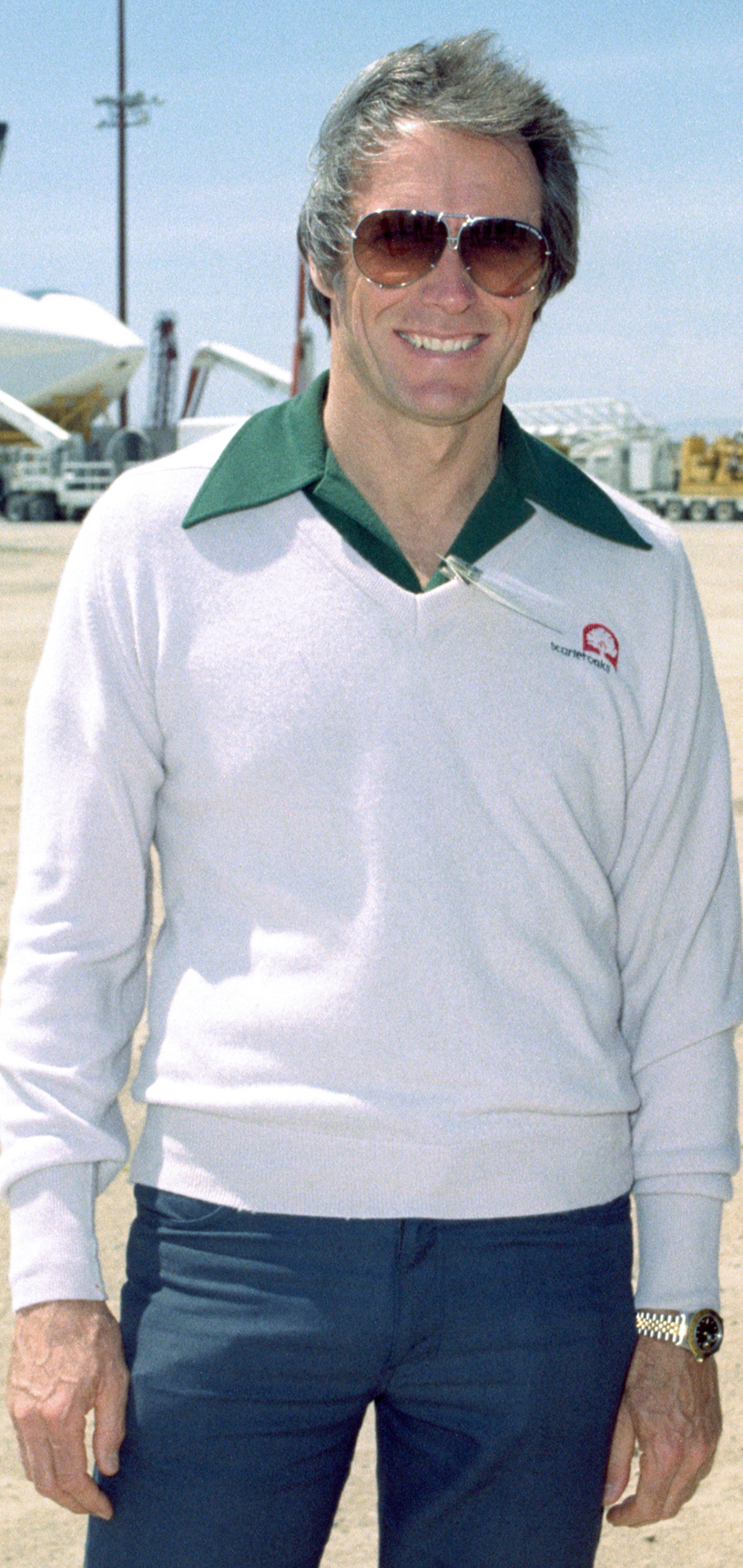
Actor Clint Eastwood collaborated with Merle Haggard on the song "Bar Room Buddies", which appeared in Eastwood's film Bronco Billy.

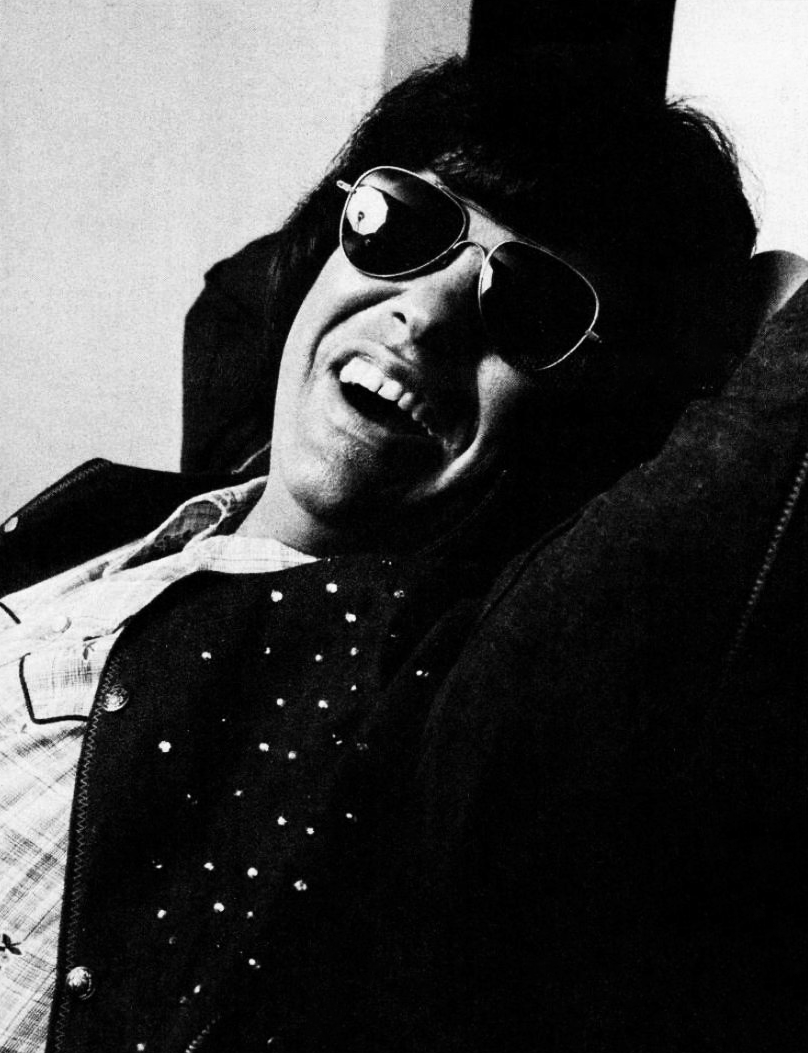
Ronnie Milsap spent six weeks at number one in 1980, the most by any artist.

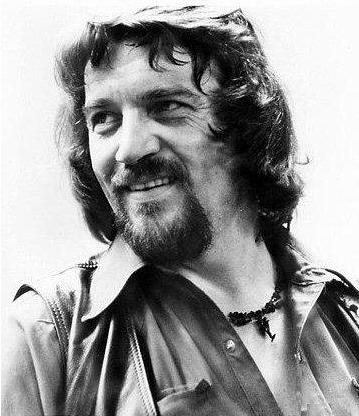
Waylon Jennings had two number ones, including the theme song from the TV series The Dukes of Hazzard.

Issue date	Title	Artist(s)	Ref.
January 5	"Coward of the County"	Kenny Rogers	
January 12	"Coward of the County"	Kenny Rogers	
January 19	"Coward of the County"	Kenny Rogers	
January 26	"I'll Be Coming Back for More"	T. G. Sheppard	
February 2	"I'll Be Coming Back for More"	T. G. Sheppard	
February 9	"Leaving Louisiana in the Broad Daylight"	The Oak Ridge Boys	
February 16	"Love Me Over Again"	Don Williams	
February 23	"Years"	Barbara Mandrell	
March 1	"I Ain't Living Long Like This"	Waylon Jennings	
March 8	"My Heroes Have Always Been Cowboys"	Willie Nelson	
March 15	"My Heroes Have Always Been Cowboys"	Willie Nelson	
March 22	"Why Don't You Spend the Night"	Ronnie Milsap	
March 29	"I'd Love to Lay You Down"	Conway Twitty	
April 5	"Sugar Daddy"	The Bellamy Brothers	
April 12	"Honky Tonk Blues"	Charley Pride	
April 19	"It's Like We Never Said Goodbye"	Crystal Gayle	
April 26	"A Lesson in Leavin'"	Dottie West	
May 3	"Are You on the Road to Lovin' Me Again"	Debby Boone	
May 10	"Beneath Still Waters"	Emmylou Harris	
May 17	"Gone Too Far"	Eddie Rabbitt	
May 24	"Starting Over Again"	Dolly Parton	
May 31	"My Heart" / "Silent Night (After the Fight)"^{[a]}	Ronnie Milsap	
June 7	"My Heart" / "Silent Night (After the Fight)"^{[a]}	Ronnie Milsap	
June 14	"My Heart" / "Silent Night (After the Fight)"^{[a]}	Ronnie Milsap	
June 21	"One Day at a Time"	Cristy Lane	
June 28	"Trying to Love Two Women"	The Oak Ridge Boys	
July 5	"He Stopped Loving Her Today"	George Jones	
July 12	"You Win Again"	Charley Pride	
July 19	"True Love Ways"	Mickey Gilley	
July 26	"Bar Room Buddies"	Merle Haggard and Clint Eastwood	
August 2	"Dancin' Cowboys"	The Bellamy Brothers	
August 9	"Stand by Me"	Mickey Gilley	
August 16	"Tennessee River"	Alabama	
August 23	"Drivin' My Life Away"	Eddie Rabbitt	
August 30	"Cowboys and Clowns" / "Misery Loves Company"^{[a]}	Ronnie Milsap	
September 6	"Lookin' for Love"	Johnny Lee	
September 13	"Lookin' for Love"	Johnny Lee	
September 20	"Lookin' for Love"	Johnny Lee	
September 27	"Old Flames Can't Hold a Candle to You"	Dolly Parton	
October 4	"Do You Wanna Go to Heaven"	T. G. Sheppard	
October 11	"Loving Up a Storm"	Razzy Bailey	
October 18	"I Believe in You"	Don Williams	
October 25	"I Believe in You"	Don Williams	
November 1	"Theme from The Dukes of Hazzard (Good Ol' Boys)"	Waylon Jennings	
November 8	"On the Road Again"	Willie Nelson	
November 15	"Could I Have This Dance"	Anne Murray	
November 22	"Lady"	Kenny Rogers	
November 29	"If You Ever Change Your Mind"	Crystal Gayle	
December 6	"Smoky Mountain Rain"	Ronnie Milsap	
December 13	"Why Lady Why"	Alabama	
December 20	"That's All That Matters"	Mickey Gilley	
December 27	"One in a Million"	Johnny Lee	

a. Double A-sided single

== See also ==
- 1980 in music
- List of artists who reached number one on the U.S. country chart
