= Son of America =

Studio album by the Corbin/Hanner Band
- Released: 1982
- Studios: Soundstage Studios, Nashville, Tennessee
- Genre: Country
- Label: Alfa
- Producer: Tommy West

The Corbin/Hanner Band chronology
For the Sake of the Song (1981)	Son of America (1982)	Black and White Photograph (1990)

Son of America is the second album by American country music group the Corbin/Hanner Band. It was released in 1982 via Alfa Records. The album contains the singles "Oklahoma Crude", "Everyone Knows I'm Yours", and "One Fine Morning".

== History ==
In the early 1980s, the group's lead vocalists Bob Corbin and Dave Hanner both wrote a number of songs for other artists, including "Lord, I Hope This Day Is Good", a number-one hit for Don Williams. The success of these songs led to them signing to Alfa Records in 1981 as the Corbin/Hanner Band. Son of America is the band's second release for Alfa, and it was promoted through a concert tour with Merle Haggard.

"Oklahoma Crude", "Everyone Knows I'm Yours", and "One Fine Morning" were all issued as singles from the project. They charted at numbers 49, 46, and 75 on the Billboard Hot Country Songs charts. The album also includes the band's own rendition of "Lord, I Hope This Day Is Good". Both Corbin and Hanner wrote songs on the album. All members of the band played on the album, as did a number of session musicians on instruments not played by the band. These included Buddy Spicher on fiddle and Bob Beach on harmonica.

== Critical reception ==
Jack Hurst of The Houston Chronicle rated the album four stars out of five. He praised the "tight, brawny musicianship and sweet harmonies". D.P. Breckenridge of The Kansas City Star reviewed the album with general favor, considering the songs written by Corbin "more muscular" than those written by Hanner, and praising the "everyman" nature of the lyrics.

== Track listing ==
Side 1

1. "Son of America" (Bob Corbin) - 3:29
2. "Lord, I Hope This Day Is Good" (Dave Hanner) - 3:19
3. "Oklahoma Crude" (Corbin) - 3:28
4. "Everyone Knows I'm Yours" (Hanner) - 3:42
5. "One Fine Morning" (Corbin) - 2:21

Side 2

1. "Let Her Go" (Corbin) - 3:42
2. "Regular Joe" (Hanner) - 2:35
3. "Poncho (Best of Friends)" (Hanner) - 3:41
4. "Queen of the Prom" (Hanner) - 2:55
5. "Rock n' Roll Baby Goodbye" (Corbin) - 4:11

== Personnel ==
The Corbin/Hanner Band

- Bob Corbin - vocals, acoustic guitar
- Dave Freeland - drums, vocals
- Dave Hanner - vocals, acoustic guitar, electric guitar, mandolin
- Kip Paxton - bass guitar, vocals
- Al Snyder - drums, vocals

Additional musicians

- Bob Beach - harmonica
- Farrell Morris - percussion
- Gary "Jake" Jacobs - pedal steel guitar
- Shane Keister - keyboards
- Warren Peterson - vocals
- Buddy Spicher - fiddle
- Tommy West - keyboards, vocals

Technical

- Jimmy Darrell - associate producer
- Steve Fralick - assistant
- Tim Kish - assistant
- Warren Peterson - recording, mixing, engineering
- Tommy West - producer
