= Corbin/Hanner =

American country music group

- Bob Corbin (left) and Dave Hanner (right), c. 1981

Background information
- Also known as: Corbin & Hanner; The Corbin/Hanner Band
- Origin: Ford City, Pennsylvania, U.S.
- Genres: Country
- Years active: 1979–1984, 1989–2014
- Labels: Lifesong; Alfa; Mercury; Liddl' Red Hen
- Spinoff of: Gravel
- Past members: Bob Corbin; Dave Freeland; Dave Hanner; Kip Paxton; Al Snyder

Corbin/Hanner, previously known as the Corbin/Hanner Band, was an American country music act from Ford City, Pennsylvania. The founding members were Bob Corbin and Dave Hanner, both songwriters, vocalists, and guitarists. They founded the Corbin/Hanner Band with Al Snyder (keyboards), Kip Paxton (bass guitar), and Dave Freeland (drums). The quintet released two albums for Alfa Records before disbanding in 1984. Corbin and Hanner reunited in 1989 as a duo, recording two more albums for Mercury Records, followed by releases on their own Liddl' Red Hen label. The duo retired from performing in 2014, and Corbin died in 2023.

Counting both the original and duo lineups, Corbin/Hanner charted eleven singles on the Billboard Hot Country Songs charts including "Livin' the Good Life" and "Everyone Knows I'm Yours", which achieved their highest peaks of number 46. Their music is defined by both members' singing and songwriting, Hanner's lead guitar work, and country rock influences. Some of their songs, such as "Work Song", draw lyrical influence from the members' upbringing in the Pittsburgh area. Both Corbin and Hanner wrote singles for Don Williams, with Corbin also having done so for Alabama and Mel Tillis.

== History ==
=== Foundation ===
Singer-songwriters Bob Corbin (April 9, 1951—September 18, 2023) and Dave Hanner (born February 22, 1949) were raised in Ford City, Pennsylvania, a suburb of Pittsburgh. The two began writing songs together after they met in school, having been inspired by the performances of the Beatles on The Ed Sullivan Show in 1964. Corbin and Hanner's first musical project was a British Invasion-themed group called the Lost Lambs, which was briefly signed with Jubilee Records in the mid-1960s. After this act was unsuccessful, both Corbin and Hanner put their musical careers on hiatus to attend college. Hanner attended Indiana University of Pennsylvania, and Corbin attended the former Alderson Broaddus University. Afterward, the two founded a country rock band called Gravel, which played a number of local gigs in Pennsylvania, Ohio, and West Virginia. Gravel was offered a contract with Columbia Records in the late 1970s, but according to Corbin, they turned it down because the label wanted to make the act a soft rock group similar to Bread. Corbin's wife, Edana, was working as a freelance writer when she got an opportunity to interview Mel Tillis for the former Country Style magazine. During the interview, she mentioned her husband's songwriting, and Tillis asked her to send him some of Corbin's songs. This led to Tillis signing both Corbin and Hanner to a songwriting contract with his publishing company Sabal, in addition to recording Corbin's composition "Blind in Love" and releasing it as a single. The success of this song led to Corbin and Hanner being discovered by producer Tommy West, who then signed him to his independent label, Lifesong Records. Credited to Corbin & Hanner, their Lifesong release "America's Sweetheart" peaked at number 85 on the Billboard Hot Country Singles (now Hot Country Songs) charts in early 1979.

=== Early 1980s: As the Corbin/Hanner Band ===
Despite the failure of their Lifesong single, both Corbin and Hanner remained active as songwriters in the early 1980s through their contract with Tillis. Hanner wrote the Oak Ridge Boys's late-1980 single "Beautiful You" and Don Williams's "Lord, I Hope This Day Is Good", a number-one country hit in 1981. The success of these cuts led to the two songwriters signing to Alfa Records in 1981 as the Corbin/Hanner Band. Also in the band were Al Snyder (keyboards), Kip Paxton (bass guitar), and Dave Freeland (drums), the latter two of whom had also been members of Gravel. According to Snyder, Corbin and Hanner were initially slated to sign to Alfa as a duo when they asked him to record a piano solo for a song they had already recorded with session musicians in Nashville, Tennessee. Snyder, who owned a music studio, chose to re-record five songs they had already completed for Alfa with him, Paxton, and Freeland instead. When executives of the label thought the re-recorded versions sounded better than those done with session musicians, they chose to sign all five members as a band. Their first Alfa album, For the Sake of the Song, came out that same year. It included the singles "Time Has Treated You Well" and "Livin' the Good Life", both of which made the Billboard country music charts after release. The latter would become the act's highest-charting single on Billboard, with a peak of number 46. West produced the album, and both Corbin and Hanner wrote several songs on it. Jack Hurst reviewed the album favorably for The Houston Chronicle, praising the songwriting and vocal harmony in particular. Due to the success of their songwriting cuts with Tillis, Williams, and the Oak Ridge Boys, the band began touring as an opening act for those artists as well.

A second Alfa album, Son of America, followed in February 1982. As with their previous album, Tommy West served as producer. They promoted this album through an opening act gig with Merle Haggard, as well as an appearance on the syndicated television series Pop! Goes the Country. Three singles charted from the project: "Oklahoma Crude", "Everyone Knows I'm Yours", and "One Fine Morning". Of these, "Everyone Knows I'm Yours" also peaked at 46 on the Billboard country charts, tying for their highest peak position. In addition to these, the album included their own rendition of "Lord, I Hope This Day Is Good". Hurst found the album "less memorable" than its predecessor, but still praised the band's harmonies and musicianship. Shortly after the album's release, Alfa Records closed, leaving the group without a contract. They performed locally before disbanding in 1984. Corbin later recalled in 1990 that a "legal situation" prevented the musicians from recording further music or signing with another label, so they chose to break up.

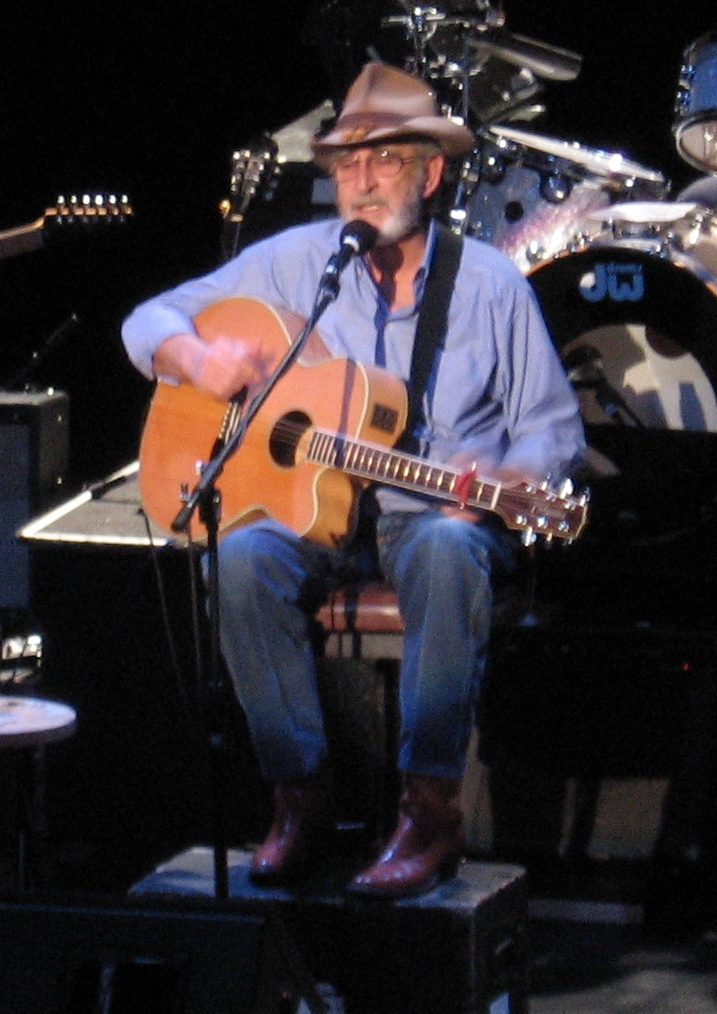
Both Corbin and Hanner wrote songs for Don Williams, pictured in 2006.

Despite the breakup, both continued to write songs. Corbin wrote "(There's A) Fire in the Night" and "Can't Keep a Good Man Down", both of which were number-one hit singles for Alabama in the middle of the decade. Williams also had a top-ten hit with Corbin's "I'll Never Be in Love Again", as did Tillis with "In the Middle of the Night", which featured both Corbin and Hanner on backing vocals. The two also supported themselves financially by composing jingles for radio and television commercials. In 1987, both Corbin and Hanner performed in a songwriters' showcase held by Mel Tillis and his publishing company in downtown Nashville. Other participants included John D. Loudermilk and Danny Dill. Corbin stated in 1990 that the breakup of the band had led to rumors that he and Hanner had separated acrimoniously, although he noted that the two remained friends after the breakup and would occasionally sing or play on each other's jingle work whenever it was possible.

=== 1989–2014: Reuinon as Corbin/Hanner ===
At the end of the 1980s, producer and music executive Harold Shedd had become president of Mercury Records's Nashville division. As he was a fan of their music, he contacted the two in March 1989 and asked them to reunite as a duo and sign with the label. Renaming themselves as Corbin/Hanner, they signed with Mercury Nashville in 1989. That same year, the Oak Ridge Boys had a hit single with "An American Family", a song written by Corbin. After signing with Mercury, Corbin/Hanner released the studio album Black and White Photograph in 1990. Black and White Photograph accounted for two singles on the Billboard country music charts: "Work Song" and "Concrete Cowboy", both written by Corbin. They had previously recorded "Work Song" as a demo when they attempted to sign to Columbia Records in the 1970s, and again for Alfa in the 1980s. Prior to its inclusion the Mercury album, Pake McEntire had also recorded the song. "Work Song" was also the act's first music video. "One More Night" was the album's third single. Shedd assisted the duo in producing the album, which consisted of five songs written by Corbin and five by Hanner. The album's title came from a lyric in the closing track, "Scooter, Michael, Danny, and Me." Both members played guitar and synthesizer on the album, while Hanner also contributed on mandolin. Other musicians included drummer Owen Hale, pianist Matt Rollings, and guitarists Brent Mason and John Willis. Paxton also contributed backing vocals. Hurst thought the project had a "rock-oriented sound" and strong lyrics, highlighting those of the singles and "Scooter, Michael, Danny, and Me" in particular. The duo returned to touring in 1991 with a backing band that included Paxton on bass guitar and vocals, along with guitarist Zane Baxter, keyboardist Catherine Styron, and drummer Steve Turner. Their first concerts in the Pittsburgh area as Corbin/Hanner were sold out.

A second project for Mercury, 1992's Just Another Hill, charted three more singles for the duo. First was the title track, followed by their highest-peaking Mercury release "I Will Stand by You" at number 49. The latter song was also made into a music video. Their last charted single overall was "Any Road", peaking at number 71 in early 1993. Unlike the previous albums, which included a mix of songs written solely by each member, Just Another Hill featured multiple songs written by both of them. Susan Beyer of The Ottawa Citizen thought the album sounded "homey" and praised both singers' voices as well as their use of vocal harmony. Star-Gazette writer Dennis Miller opined similarly, while also noting influences of the Everly Brothers, Roy Orbison, and Bruce Springsteen on individual tracks. Because the album and its singles had been commercially unsuccessful, Mercury announced plans to drop the duo in 1993.

Despite exiting Mercury, Corbin/Hanner continued to perform locally around Pittsburgh. The two noted that fans continued to ask them when they would release any new music, and they chose to start releasing music independently through their own record label, Liddl' Red Hen. First was 1997's Every Stranger Has a Story. The duo promoted this album with an acoustic concert at Borders bookstore in Pittsburgh's Northway Mall (now the Block Northway). Its release overlapped with a concert album released by Silver Eagle Cross Country, titled Corbin/Hanner Band, which consisted of a live recording made by the band at the Palomino Club in Los Angeles, California, in 1982. This was followed by another independent album, By Request, in 1999. That same year, Corbin co-wrote the title track of Kenny Rogers's She Rides Wild Horses. The compilation Originals followed in 2000, also on Liddl' Red Hen. The duo continued to perform locally during this timespan. In 2001, they performed a local benefit concert for Help, Inc., a non-profit organization to aid homeless children in Westmoreland County.

In 2008, Corbin/Hanner released their final album, And the Road Goes On. They promoted this album with a concert at Ford City Heritage Days. Serving as the opening act was local country singer Vanessa Campagna, whose debut album was produced by Corbin. The same year, Hanner's children Casey and Jake founded a band called Donora, which released an extended play on Rostrum Records. Corbin/Hanner continued to perform locally in Pennsylvania before disbanding in 2014. Their last shows were held at Jergel's Rhythm Grille in Warrendale, Pennsylvania. By the time of their final concert series, Corbin and his wife had moved to Ecuador. Corbin died September 18, 2023, of undisclosed causes. Edana died within the same month, inspiring the couple's daughter Jess to release a CD titled Simple.

== Musical styles ==
Corbin/Hanner is noted for their country rock sound and for recording mostly their own songs. In 1982, Corbin told The Pittsburgh Press that he did not consider the act's music to be strictly country, but that it took on a more country influence as the trends of the genre itself were changing through the popularity of artists such as Kenny Rogers. He also observed in 2014 that, when they were still known as Gravel, they often performed covers of artists such as Creedence Clearwater Revival and Neil Young, acts whom he found were also popular with fans of country. Record World writer Joseph Ianello stated of the band's 1980s work, "they're a perfect balance between sweet melodic pop (Hanner) and gruff, biting, progressive country-rock (Corbin). Backed by a three-piece rhythm section, they provide a likeable yet lyrically-challenging blend of contemporary country-pop." Hurst cited the Corbin/Hanner band lineup as an example of the increased interest in country bands that played their own instruments following the success of Alabama at the start of the decade, as opposed to most prior country groups whose members were strictly vocalists. Greg Allen of The Press of Atlantic City compared the band's sound to the Doobie Brothers and the Eagles due to the vocal harmony and country rock influences, while Jerry Sharpe of The Pittsburgh Press found their vocals comparable to Tompall & the Glaser Brothers. He also thought their 1990s work as a duo contained influences of their upbringing in Pittsburgh, citing in particular the blue-collar lyrics of "Work Song" and "Concrete Cowboy". An uncredited article in Cash Box noted that the former was commonly requested of country stations in the Pittsburgh area over two years after its release.

Of their reunion as a duo, Sharpe noted that both singers were in their forties when Black and White Photograph was released, and thought this made their vocal deliveries more confident than on their 1980s material. He characterized Hanner as a tenor and Corbin as a baritone. Typically, their albums featured some songs written by Corbin and others by Hanner, with each member also providing lead vocals on the songs they wrote and the other member harmonizing. However, Just Another Hill featured songs that the two wrote together. Beyer found influences of the Everly Brothers in their prominent use of two-part vocal harmony. She also contrasted the duo with Brooks & Dunn, and considered Corbin/Hanner to have "more soul". Additionally, she compared Hanner's lead guitar work on their songs to the works of Duane Eddy and the Byrds.

== Discography ==
All works in the 1980s credited to the Corbin/Hanner Band; all works from 1990 onward credited to Corbin/Hanner.

=== Albums ===
Title	Album details
For the Sake of the Song	Release date: 1981; Label: Alfa
Son of America	Release date: 1982; Label: Alfa
Black and White Photograph	Release date: 1990; Label: Mercury Nashville
Just Another Hill	Release date: 1992; Label: Mercury Nashville
Corbin/Hanner Band	Release date: 1997; Label: Silver Eagle
Every Stranger Has a Story	Release date: 1997; Label: Liddl' Red Hen
By Request	Release date: 1999; Label: Liddl' Red Hen
Originals	Release date: 2000; Label: Liddl' Red Hen
And the Road Goes On	Release date: 2008; Label: Liddl' Red Hen

==== Singles ====
Year	Title	Chart Positions		Album
Year	Title	US Country	CAN Country	Album
1979	"America's Sweetheart" (as Corbin & Hanner)	85	—	Single only
1981	"Time Has Treated You Well"	64	—	For the Sake of the Song
1981	"Livin' the Good Life"	46	—	For the Sake of the Song
1982	"Oklahoma Crude"	49	—	Son of America
1982	"Everyone Knows I'm Yours"	46	—	Son of America
1982	"One Fine Morning"	75	—	Son of America
1990	"Work Song"	55	81	Black and White Photograph
1991	"Concrete Cowboy"	59	—	Black and White Photograph
1991	"One More Night"	—	—	Black and White Photograph
1992	"Just Another Hill"	73	—	Just Another Hill
1992	"I Will Stand by You"	49	71	Just Another Hill
1993	"Any Road"	71	—	Just Another Hill

=== Music videos ===
Year	Video	Director
1990	"Work Song"	Marius Penczner
1992	"I Will Stand by You"	not listed
