= 16th Academy of Country Music Awards =

US music awards ceremony in 1981

- Date: April 30, 1981
- Location: Shrine Auditorium, Los Angeles, California
- Hosted by: Larry Gatlin; Don Meredith; Tammy Wynette

Highlights
- Most wins: George Jones (3)
- Most nominations: Kenny Rogers (5)

Television/radio coverage
- Network: NBC

The 16th Academy of Country Music Awards ceremony was held on April 30, 1981, at the Shrine Auditorium, Los Angeles, California. It was hosted by Larry Gatlin, Don Meredith and Tammy Wynette.

== Winners and nominees ==
Winners are shown in bold.

| Entertainer of the Year | Album of the Year |
|---|---|
| **Barbara Mandrell**; Willie Nelson; Dolly Parton; Eddie Rabbitt; Kenny Rogers | **Urban Cowboy — Soundtrack**; Coal Miner's Daughter: Original Motion Picture Soundtrack — Soundtrack; Greatest Hits — Kenny Rogers; I Believe in You — Don Williams; There's a Little Bit of Hank in Me — Charley Pride |
| Top Female Vocalist of the Year | Top Male Vocalist of the Year |
| **Dolly Parton**; Lacy J. Dalton; Crystal Gayle; Emmylou Harris; Barbara Mandrell | **George Jones**; Ronnie Milsap; Eddie Rabbitt; Kenny Rogers; Don Williams |
| Top Vocal Group of the Year | Top Vocal Duo of the Year |
| **Alabama**; Charlie Daniels Band; Larry Gatlin & the Gatlin Brothers; Oak Ridge Boys; Statler Brothers | **Moe Bandy** **and** **Joe Stampley**; Bellamy Brothers; Jim Ed Brown and Helen Cornelius; Kenny Rogers and Kim Carnes; Conway Twitty and Loretta Lynn |
| Single Record of the Year | Song of the Year |
| **"He Stopped Loving Her Today"** — **George Jones**; "9 to 5" — Dolly Parton; "Drivin' My Life Away" — Eddie Rabbitt; "I Believe in You" — Don Williams; "Lookin' for Love" — Johnny Lee | **"He Stopped Loving Her Today"** — **Curly Putman, Bobby Braddock**; "9 to 5" — Dolly Parton; "I Believe in You" — Roger Cook, Sam Hogin; "Lady" — Lionel Richie; "Lookin' for Love" — Bob Morrison, Wanda Mallette, Patti Ryan |
| Top New Male Vocalist | Top New Female Vocalist |
| **Johnny Lee**; Ed Bruce; Leon Everette; Don King; Steve Wariner | **Terri Gibbs**; Kim Carnes; Reba McEntire; Sissy Spacek; Sylvia |
Pioneer Award
**Ernest Tubb**
Special Achievement Award
**George Burns**
Tex Ritter Award
**Any Which Way You Can**
