= New Moves =

Studio album by Don Williams
- Released: January 17, 1986
- Genre: Country
- Length: 32:12
- Label: Capitol
- Producer: Don Williams, Garth Fundis

Don Williams chronology
| Cafe Carolina (1984) | New Moves (1986) | Traces (1987) |

New Moves is the fifteenth studio album by American country music artist Don Williams. It was released on January 17, 1986 via Capitol Records. The album includes the singles "We've Got a Good Fire Goin'", "Heartbeat in the Darkness", "Then It's Love" "Señorita" and "I'll Never Be in Love Again".

== Track listing ==
| No. | Title | Writer(s) | Length |
|---|---|---|---|
| 1. | "Heartbeat in the Darkness" | Dave Loggins, Russell Smith | 3:50 |
| 2. | "I'll Never Be in Love Again" | Bob Corbin | 3:10 |
| 3. | "Shot Full of Love" | Bob McDill | 2:45 |
| 4. | "We Got Love" | McDill | 2:33 |
| 5. | "Send Her Roses" | Pat McLaughlin | 3:22 |
| 6. | "Señorita" | Danny Flowers, Hank DeVito | 4:12 |
| 7. | "The Light in Your Eyes" | Don Williams | 3:07 |
| 8. | "It's About Time" | John Virgin | 2:40 |
| 9. | "Then It's Love" | Dennis Linde | 3:25 |
| 10. | "We've Got a Good Fire Goin'" | Loggins | 3:08 |

== Chart performance ==
| Chart (1986) | Peak position |
|---|---|
| US Top Country Albums (Billboard) | 29 |
