= Traces =

Traces may refer to:

== Literature ==
- Traces (book), a 1998 short-story collection by Stephen Baxter
- Traces series, a series of novels by Malcolm Rose

== Music ==
=== Albums ===
- Traces (Classics IV album) or the title song (see below), 1969
- Traces (Jean-Jacques Goldman album), 1989
- Traces (Karine Polwart album), 2012
- Traces (The Ransom Collective album) or the title song, 2017
- Traces (Steve Perry album), 2018
- Traces, by Don Williams, 1987
- Traces, by Seals and Crofts, 2004

=== Songs ===
- "Traces" (song), by the Classics IV, 1969
- "Traces", by Built to Spill from You in Reverse, 2006

== Other uses ==
- Traces, Texas, US
- TRACES, Trade Control and Expert System, a web-based veterinarian certification tool
- Traces (TV series), a 2019 British crime drama
- Traces literal English translation of 2025 German TV series, Spuren, titled The Black Forest Murders
- Traces (software), an Amiga ray trace engine written by Ton Roosendaal

== See also ==
- Trace (disambiguation)
- Trace evidence, used in forensic science
- Digital traces
