= True Love (Don Williams album) =

Studio album by Don Williams
- Released: 1990
- Genre: Country
- Length: 33:34
- Label: RCA
- Producer: Don Williams, Garth Fundis

Don Williams chronology
One Good Well (1989)	True Love (1990)	Currents (1992)

True Love is a studio album by the American country musician Don Williams. It was released in 1990 by RCA Records. The album includes the singles "Back in My Younger Days", "True Love" and "Lord Have Mercy on a Country Boy".

== Production ==
The album was coproduced by Williams and Garth Fundis. "Just 'Cause I'm in Love with You" is a cover of the Jesse Winchester song.

== Critical reception ==
Professional ratings
Review scores
Source	Rating
AllMusic	3/5 stars
Chicago Tribune	3/4 stars

The Province wrote that "Williams's classic unadorned signature ... is lukewarm on True Love." The Chicago Tribune deemed the album an "unusually rhythmic collection," writing that Williams's voice "remains as warm as a favorite memory." The Buffalo News opined that "nobody sings about the average lives of average Americans with more poignancy than Don Williams." The Orange County Register noted that "Lord, Have Mercy on a Country Boy" "may be the least preachy and most elegant song yet about the devastation to our environment."

== Track listing ==
No.	Title	Writer(s)	Length
1.	"True Love"	Pat Alger	2:50
2.	"Lord Have Mercy on a Country Boy"	Bob McDill	2:56
3.	"Darlin' That's What Your Love Does"	Hugh Prestwood	3:41
4.	"Come a Little Closer"	McDill, Paul Harrison	3:39
5.	"Just 'Cause I'm in Love with You"	Jesse Winchester	3:32
6.	"Back in My Younger Days"	Danny Flowers	3:15
7.	"Donald and June"	Craig Bickhardt	3:43
8.	"Diamonds to Dust"	Dan Fogelberg	3:15
9.	"Jamaica Farewell"	Irving Burgie	2:52
10.	"Loving You's Like Coming Home"	McDill	3:55

== Chart performance ==
Chart (1990)	Peak position
US Top Country Albums (Billboard)	56
