= Yellow Moon (Don Williams album) =

Studio album by Don Williams
- Released: March 25, 1983
- Genre: Country
- Length: 31:25
- Label: MCA
- Producer: Don Williams, Garth Fundis

Don Williams chronology
| Listen to the Radio (1982) | Yellow Moon (1983) | Cafe Carolina (1984) |

Yellow Moon is the thirteenth studio album by American country music artist Don Williams. It was released on March 25, 1983, via MCA Records. The album includes the singles "Love Is on a Roll", "Nobody but You" and "Stay Young".

== Track listing ==
| No. | Title | Writer(s) | Length |
|---|---|---|---|
| 1. | "Stay Young" | Benny Gallagher, Graham Lyle | 3:05 |
| 2. | "I'm Still Looking for You" | Bob McDill | 3:05 |
| 3. | "The Story of My Life" | Burt Bacharach, Hal David | 2:49 |
| 4. | "Wrong End of the Rainbow" | Richard Leigh, Milton Blackford | 3:26 |
| 5. | "Yellow Moon" | Richard "Spady" Brannon | 2:55 |
| 6. | "Love Is on a Roll" | John Prine, Roger Cook | 3:40 |
| 7. | "Pressure Makes Diamonds" | McDill, John Schweers | 3:35 |
| 8. | "If Love Gets There Before I Do" | Dickey Lee, Kerry Chater | 3:26 |
| 9. | "I'll Take Your Love Anytime" | Tommy Rocco, Charlie Black | 2:45 |
| 10. | "Nobody but You" | J. D. Martin, John Jarrard | 2:39 |

== Chart performance ==
| Chart (1983) | Peak position |
|---|---|
| US Top Country Albums (Billboard) | 13 |
| Canadian RPM Country Albums | 1 |
