= 1981 Country Music Association Awards =

Annual US music awards ceremony

- Date: October 12, 1981
- Location: Grand Ole Opry House, Nashville, Tennessee
- Hosted by: Mac Davis; Barbara Mandrell
- Most wins: Alabama; Barbara Mandrell (2 each)
- Most nominations: Alabama (5)

Television/radio coverage
- Network: CBS

The 1981 Country Music Association Awards, 15th Ceremony, was held on October 12, 1981, at the Grand Ole Opry House, Nashville, Tennessee, and was hosted by CMA Award winners Mac Davis and Barbara Mandrell.

== Winners and nominees ==
Winners in Bold.

Entertainer of the Year	Album of the Year
**Barbara Mandrell**; Alabama; George Jones; The Oak Ridge Boys; Kenny Rogers	**I Believe in You —** **Don Williams**; 9 To 5 And Odd Jobs — Dolly Parton; Feels So Right — Alabama; I Am What I Am — George Jones; Out Where The Bright Lights Are Glowing —Ronnie Milsap
Male Vocalist of the Year	Female Vocalist of the Year
**George Jones**; Ronnie Milsap; Willie Nelson; Kenny Rogers; Don Williams	**Barbara Mandrell**; Terri Gibbs; Emmylou Harris; Loretta Lynn; Anne Murray
Vocal Group of the Year	Vocal Duo of the Year
**Alabama**; The Bellamy Brothers; Larry Gatlin & The Gatlin Brothers; The Oak Ridge Boys; The Statler Brothers	**David Frizzell and Shelly West**; Conway Twitty and Loretta Lynn; George Jones and Tammy Wynette; Moe Bandy and Joe Stampley; Waylon Jennings and Jessi Colter
Single of the Year	Song of the Year
**"Elvira" — The Oak Ridge Boys**; "I Believe in You" — Don Williams; "I Was Country (When Country Wasn't Cool)" — Barbara Mandrell; "Old Flame" — Alabama; "Somebody's Knockin'" — Terri Gibbs	**"He Stopped Loving Her Today" — Bobby Braddock and Curly Putman**; "Elvira" — Dallas Frazier; "I Believe In You" — Roger Cook and Sam Hogin; "I Was Country (When Country Wasn't Cool)" —Kye Fleming and Dennis Morgan; "I'm Just An Old Chunk Of Coal" — Billy Joe Shaver
Horizon Award	Instrumentalist of the Year
**Terri Gibbs**; Rosanne Cash; Boxcar Willie; T.G. Sheppard; David Frizzell and Shelly West	**Chet Atkins**; Floyd Cramer; Johnny Gimble; Charlie McCoy; Hargus "Pig" Robbins
Instrumental Group of the Year
**Alabama**; Charlie Daniels Band; Don Williams Band; Larry Gatlin & The Gatlin Brothers; Oak Ridge Boys Band

== Hall of Fame ==
Country Music Hall of Fame Inductees
- Vernon Dalhart
- Grant Turner
