= Maybe That's All It Takes =

Single by Don Williams

from the album One Good Well
- B-side: "We're All the Way"
- Released: June 16, 1990
- Genre: Country
- Length: 4:17
- Label: RCA
- Songwriter(s): Beth Nielsen Chapman
- Producer(s): Don Williams, Garth Fundis

Don Williams singles chronology
| "Just as Long as I Have You" (1990) | "Maybe That's All It Takes" (1990) | "Back in My Younger Days" (1990) |

"Maybe That's All It Takes" is a song recorded by American country music artist Don Williams. It was released in June 1990 as the fourth single from the album One Good Well. The song reached #22 on the Billboard Hot Country Singles & Tracks chart. The song was written by Beth Nielsen Chapman.

== Chart performance ==
| Chart (1990) | Peak position |
|---|---|
| US Hot Country Songs (Billboard) | 22 |
| Canadian RPM Country Tracks | 47 |
