= Desperately =

Desperately may refer to:

== Albums ==
- Desperately (album), by Barrabás

== Songs ==
- "Desperately" (Bruce Robison song), covered by George Strait
- "Desperately" (Don Williams song)
- "Desperately", by Michelle Branch from Hotel Paper
- "Desperately", by Sara Evans from Stronger
- "Desperately", by Slaughter from Stick It to Ya
