= As Long as I Have You =

As Long as I Have You may refer to:

- As Long as I Have You (album), by Roger Daltrey
  - "As Long as I Have You", a song by Roger Daltrey from the album of the same name
- As Long as I Have You, an album by Garnet Mimms
  - "As Long as I Have You", a song by Garnet Mimms from the album of the same name, written by Bob Elgin & Jerry Ragovoy
- "As Long as I Have You", a song written by Fred Wise and Ben Weisman, performed by Elvis Presley from the album King Creole
- "As Long as I Have You", a song by Dove Cameron from the album Liv and Maddie: Music from the TV Series
- "I'll Get By (As Long as I Have You)", a song with music by Fred E. Ahlert and lyrics by Roy Turk, covered by multiple artists

== See also ==
- "Just as Long as I Have You", a song by Don Williams from the album One Good Well
