= Falling Again (disambiguation) =

"Falling Again" is a song recorded by Don Williams for his album I Believe in You. It may also refer to:

- "Fallin' Again", a song by Alabama from their album Just Us
- "Falling Again", a song by Lacuna Coil from the album In a Reverie
