= Nobody but You (Don Williams song) =

Single by Don Williams

from the album Yellow Moon
- B-side: "If Love Gets There Before I Do"
- Released: July 1983
- Genre: Country
- Length: 2:41
- Label: MCA
- Songwriter(s): John Jarrard; J.D. Martin
- Producer(s): Don Williams; Garth Fundis

Don Williams singles chronology
"Love Is on a Roll" (1983)	"Nobody but You" (1983)	"Stay Young" (1983)

"Nobody but You" is a song written by J. D. Martin and John Jarrard, and recorded by American country music artist Don Williams. It was released in July 1983 as the second single from his album Yellow Moon. The song reached No. 2 on the Billboard Hot Country Singles chart and No. 1 on the RPM Country Tracks chart in Canada.

== Chart performance ==
Chart (1983)	Peak position
US Hot Country Songs (Billboard)	2
Canadian RPM Country Tracks	1
