= Heartbeat in the Darkness =

Single by Don Williams

from the album New Moves
- B-side: "Light in Your Eyes"
- Released: May 1986
- Genre: Country
- Length: 3:50
- Label: Capitol
- Songwriter(s): Dave Loggins; Russell Smith
- Producer(s): Don Williams; Garth Fundis

Don Williams singles chronology
"We've Got a Good Fire Goin'" (1985)	"Heartbeat in the Darkness" (1986)	"Then It's Love" (1986)

"Heartbeat in the Darkness" is a song written by Dave Loggins and Russell Smith, and recorded by American country music artist Don Williams. It was released in May 1986 as the second single from the album New Moves. The song was Williams' 17th and final number one on the country chart. The single spent one week at number one and spent a total of 13 weeks on the chart.

== Chart performance ==
Chart (1986)	Peak position
US Hot Country Songs (Billboard)	1
Canadian RPM Country Tracks	2
