= For the Sake of the Song (The Corbin/Hanner Band album) =

Studio album by the Corbin/Hanner Band
- Released: 1981
- Studio: Soundstage Studios, Nashville, Tennessee
- Genre: Country
- Label: Alfa
- Producer: Tommy West

The Corbin/Hanner Band chronology
For the Sake of the Song (1981)	Son of America (1982)

For the Sake of the Song is the debut album of American country music group the Corbin/Hanner Band (later known as Corbin/Hanner). It was released in 1981 via Alfa Records. The album contains the singles "Time Has Treated You Well" and "Livin' the Good Life".

== Content ==
Group members Bob Corbin and Dave Hanner, prior to the album's release, wrote a number of songs for other artists. These included "Beautiful You" for the Oak Ridge Boys, "Dinosaur" for Hank Williams Jr., and "Time Has Treated You Well" for Mel Tillis. The Corbin/Hanner band included their own versions on For the Sake of the Song. "Work Song" was later recorded by Pake McEntire on his 1988 album My Whole World. Corbin and Hanner later recorded the song again for Mercury Records in 1990.

According to Al Snyder, then the band's keyboardist, Corbin and Hanner intended to sign to Alfa Records as a duo. However, in the process of recording songs for the label, Snyder encouraged the two to re-record songs the two had completed with Nashville, Tennessee-based session musicians. The re-recordings featured Snyder on keyboards, along with bassist Kip Paxton and drummer Dave Freeland, with whom Corbin and Hanner had previously performed in a Pittsburgh-based band called Gravel. As executives of Alfa thought the re-recordings were superior to the original recordings, the label chose to sign all five members as a band. "Time Has Treated You Well" and "Livin' the Good Life" were both issued as singles on For the Sake of the Song. Respectively, they reached numbers 64 and 46 on the Billboard Hot Country Songs charts.

== Critical reception ==
Rating the album four out of five stars, Jack Hurst of The Houston Chronicle wrote that it had "driving rhythms, beautiful vocal harmonies, and impressive songwriting." D.P. Breckenridge of The Kansas City Star was more mixed, calling Corbin's and Hanner's vocals "mild-mannered" and the musicianship "unpretentious". Breckenridge also considered the versions of "Beautiful You" and "Time Has Treated You Well" inferior to their respective versions by other artists.

== Track listing ==
Side 1

1. "For the Sake of the Song" (Hanner) - 2:50
2. "Time Has Treated You Well" (Hanner) - 2:50
3. "Work Song" (Corbin) - 3:10
4. "Beautiful You" (Hanner) - 3:44
5. "Dinosaur" (Corbin) - 4:30

Side 2

1. "I've Got You" (Hanner) - 2:34
2. "On the Wings of My Victory" (Corbin) - 4:11
3. "Livin' the Good Life" (Corbin) - 2:34
4. "Long Gone Blues" (Hanner) - 3:08
5. "Pittsville Drum and Bugle Corp" (Hanner) - 2:55
6. "Nashville Wimmin" (Harlan Howard) - 3:35

== Personnel ==
The Corbin/Hanner Band

- Bob Corbin - vocals, acoustic guitar, keyboards
- Dave Freeland - drums, vocals
- Dave Hanner - vocals, acoustic guitar, electric guitar, mandolin
- Kip Paxton - bass guitar, vocals
- Al Snyder - keyboards, vocals

Additional musicians

- Gary "Jake" Jacobs - steel guitar, Dobro

Technical

- Jimmy Darrell - associate producer
- Warren Peterson - recording, mixing, engineering
- Tommy West - producer
- Hank Williams - mastering
