= Just Another Hill =

Studio album by Corbin/Hanner
- Released: 1992
- Genre: Country
- Label: Mercury
- Producer: Bob Corbin; Jim Cotton; Dave Hanner; Joe Scaife; Harold Shedd

Corbin/Hanner chronology
Black and White Photograph (1990)	Just Another Hill (1992)	Corbin/Hanner Band (1997)

Just Another Hill is the fourth studio album by American country music duo Corbin/Hanner. It was released in 1992 via Mercury Records. The album contains the singles "Just Another Hill", "I Will Stand by You", and "Any Road".

== Content ==
Just Another Hill contains three singles. These were the title track, "I Will Stand by You", and "Any Road". Respectively, these peaked at numbers 73, 49, and 71 on the Billboard Hot Country Songs charts.

Unlike their previous albums, where Corbin and Hanner each wrote songs individually, Just Another Hill features songs written by both of them. This includes "Any Road", which both of them wrote with Kevin Herring, then working as a promotional manager for Mercury Records. The song was Herring's first cut as a songwriter.

== Critical reception ==
Susan Beyer of The Ottawa Citizen thought the album sounded "homey" and praised both singers' voices as well as their use of vocal harmony. Star-Gazette writer Dennis Miller opined similarly, while also noting influences of the Everly Brothers, Roy Orbison, and Bruce Springsteen on individual tracks.

== Track listing ==
1. "Just Another Hill" (Bob Corbin, Dave Hanner) - 3:10
2. "Any Road" (Corbin, Hanner, Kevin Herring) - 3:40
3. "These Walls Are Fallin' Down" (Corbin) - 3:14
4. "The Real You" (Hanner) - 3:17
5. "If Wishes Were Horses" (Corbin) - 3:09
6. "I Could Be the One" (Corbin, Hanner) - 2:50
7. "I Will Stand by You" (Corbin) - 3:21
8. "Everyone Knows I'm Yours" (Hanner) - 3:58
9. "Her Wicked Ways" (Corbin) - 2:54
10. "Like a Dream" (Hanner) - 4:50

== Personnel ==
Corbin/Hanner

- Bob Corbin - vocals
- Dave Hanner - vocals, guitar

Additional musicians

- Bob Mater - drums
- Kip Paxton - vocals, bass guitar
- Gary Prim - keyboards
- Lonnie Wilson - drums

Technical

- Bob Corbin - producer
- Jim Cotton - producer
- Dave Hanner - producer
- Joe Scaife - producer
- Harold Shedd - producer
- Ronnie Thomas - digital editing
- Hank Williams - mastering
