= Maggie's Dream (song) =

Single by Don Williams

from the album Cafe Carolina
- B-side: "Leavin'"
- Released: September 1, 1984
- Studio: Sound Emporium (Nashville, Tennessee)
- Genre: Country
- Length: 4:08
- Label: MCA
- Songwriter(s): Dave Loggins, Lisa Silver
- Producer(s): Don Williams, Garth Fundis

Don Williams singles chronology
| "That's the Thing About Love" (1984) | "Maggie's Dream" (1984) | "Walkin' a Broken Heart" (1984) |

"Maggie's Dream" is a song written by Dave Loggins and Lisa Silver, and recorded by American country music artist Don Williams. It was released in September 1984 as the second single from the album Cafe Carolina. The song reached number 11 on the Billboard Hot Country Singles & Tracks chart. It was covered by Trisha Yearwood on the 2017 Williams tribute album Gentle Giants: The Music of Don Williams.

== Content ==
The song is about a waitress named Maggie, who has been single her entire life. On the surface, she seems content in her job as a truckstop waitress, having made many friendships with the truck drivers that have been customers through the years. Deep down she is lonely, having never had a true love, and dreams one day of becoming a wife and traveling beyond the mountains around Asheville (which an omniscient observer notes "she's never seen the other side), and takes solace in playing sad songs on the jukebox.

== Chart performance ==
| Chart (1984) | Peak position |
|---|---|
| US Hot Country Songs (Billboard) | 11 |
| Canadian RPM Country Tracks | 13 |
