= The Ties That Bind (Don Williams song) =

Single by Don Williams

from the album Don Williams Vol. III
- B-side: "Goodbye Isn't Really Good at All"
- Released: December 9, 1974
- Genre: Country
- Length: 2:36
- Label: ABC/Dot
- Songwriter(s): Clyde Otis, Vin Corso
- Producer(s): Don Williams

Don Williams singles chronology
| "I Wouldn't Want to Live If You Didn't Love Me" (1974) | "The Ties That Bind" (1974) | "You're My Best Friend" (1975) |

"The Ties That Bind" is a song written by Clyde Otis and Vin Corso, and recorded by American country music artist Don Williams. It was released in December 1974 as the second and final single from the album Don Williams Vol. III. The song reached number four on the Billboard Hot Country Singles and Tracks chart and number 2 on the Canadian RPM Country Tracks chart.

== Charts ==
=== Weekly charts ===
| Chart (1974–1975) | Peak position |
|---|---|
| US Hot Country Songs (Billboard) | 4 |
| Canadian RPM Country Tracks | 2 |

=== Year-end charts ===
| Chart (1975) | Position |
|---|---|
| US Hot Country Songs (Billboard) | 40 |
