= It's Time for Love (Don Williams song) =

Single by Don Williams

from the album Cafe Carolina
- B-side: "I'll Never Need Another You"
- Released: October 12, 1985
- Studio: Sound Emporium (Nashville, Tennessee)
- Genre: Country
- Length: 3:56
- Label: MCA
- Songwriter(s): Bob McDill, Hunter Moore
- Producer(s): Don Williams, Garth Fundis

Don Williams singles chronology
"Walkin' a Broken Heart" (1985)	"It's Time for Love" (1985)	"We've Got a Good Fire Goin'" (1986)

"It's Time for Love" is a song written by Bob McDill and Hunter Moore, and recorded by American country music artist Don Williams. It was released in October 1985 as the fourth single from the album Cafe Carolina. The song reached number 20 on the Billboard Hot Country Singles & Tracks chart.

== Chart performance ==
Chart (1985)	Peak position
US Hot Country Songs (Billboard)	20
Canadian RPM Country Tracks	49
