= Another Place, Another Time (Don Williams song) =

Single by Don Williams

from the album Traces
- B-side: "Running Out of Reason to Run"
- Released: March 12, 1988
- Genre: Country
- Length: 3:11
- Label: Capitol
- Songwriters: Bob McDill, Paul Harrison
- Producers: Don Williams, Garth Fundis

Don Williams singles chronology
"I Wouldn't Be a Man" (1987)	"Another Place, Another Time" (1988)	"Desperately" (1988)

"Another Place, Another Time" is a song written by Bob McDill and Paul Harrison, and recorded by American country music artist Don Williams. It was released in March 1988 as the second single from the album Traces. The song reached number 5 on the Billboard Hot Country Singles & Tracks chart.

== Charts ==
=== Weekly charts ===
Chart (1988)	Peak position
US Hot Country Songs (Billboard)	5

=== Year-end charts ===
Chart (1988)	Position
US Hot Country Songs (Billboard)	57
