= I've Been Loved by the Best =

Single by Don Williams

from the album One Good Well
- B-side: "Won't Love Me Like You Love Me"
- Released: September 16, 1989
- Genre: Country
- Length: 3:34
- Label: RCA
- Songwriters: Bob McDill, Paul Harrison
- Producers: Don Williams, Garth Fundis

Don Williams singles chronology
"One Good Well" (1989)	"I've Been Loved by the Best" (1989)	"Just as Long as I Have You" (1990)

"I've Been Loved by the Best" is a song written by Bob McDill and Paul Harrison, and recorded by American country music artist Don Williams. It was released in September 1989 as the second single from the album One Good Well. The song reached number 4 on the Billboard Hot Country Singles & Tracks chart.

== Chart performance ==
Chart (1989)	Peak position
Canada Country Singles (RPM)	11
US Hot Country Songs (Billboard)	4
