= One Good Well =

Single by Don Williams

from the album One Good Well
- B-side: "Flowers Won't Grow (In Gardens of Stone)"
- Released: April 22, 1989
- Genre: Country
- Length: 2:56
- Label: RCA
- Songwriters: Mike Reid, Kent Robbins
- Producers: Don Williams, Garth Fundis

Don Williams singles chronology
| "Old Coyote Town" (1989) | "One Good Well" (1989) | "I've Been Loved by the Best" (1989) |

"One Good Well" is a song written by Mike Reid and Kent Robbins, and recorded by American country music artist Don Williams. It was released in April 1989 as the first single and title track from the album One Good Well. The song reached number 4 on the Billboard Hot Country Singles & Tracks chart.

== Chart performance ==
| Chart (1989) | Peak position |
|---|---|
| Canada Country Singles (RPM) | 3 |
| US Hot Country Songs (Billboard) | 4 |

=== Year-end charts ===
| Chart (1989) | Position |
|---|---|
| Canada Country Tracks (RPM) | 85 |
| US Country Songs (Billboard) | 30 |
