= Then It's Love =

Single by Don Williams

from the album New Moves
- B-side: "It's About Time"
- Released: October 18, 1986
- Genre: Country
- Length: 3:26
- Label: Capitol
- Songwriter(s): Dennis Linde
- Producer(s): Don Williams, Garth Fundis

Don Williams singles chronology
"Heartbeat in the Darkness" (1986)	"Then It's Love" (1986)	"Señorita" (1987)

"Then It's Love" is a song written by Dennis Linde, and recorded by American country music artist Don Williams. It was released in October 1986 as the third single from the album New Moves. The song reached number 3 on the Billboard Hot Country Singles & Tracks chart.

== Charts ==
=== Weekly charts ===
Chart (1986–1987)	Peak position
US Hot Country Songs (Billboard)	3
Canadian RPM Country Tracks	4

=== Year-end charts ===
Chart (1987)	Position
US Hot Country Songs (Billboard)	47
