= Mistakes (Don Williams song) =

Single by Don Williams

from the album Listen to the Radio
- B-side: "Fool, Fool Heart"
- Released: August 21, 1982
- Genre: Country
- Length: 2:54
- Label: MCA
- Songwriter(s): Richard Feldman
- Producer(s): Don Williams, Garth Fundis

Don Williams singles chronology
"Listen to the Radio" (1982)	"Mistakes" (1982)	"If Hollywood Don't Need You (Honey I Still Do)" (1982)

"Mistakes" is a song written by Richard Feldman, and recorded by American country music artist Don Williams. It was released in August 1982 as the second single from the album Listen to the Radio. The song reached number 3 on the Billboard Hot Country Singles & Tracks chart

== Chart performance ==
Chart (1982)	Peak position
US Hot Country Songs (Billboard)	3
Canadian RPM Country Tracks	3
