= Miracles (Don Williams song) =

Single by Don Williams

from the album Especially for You
- B-side: "I Don't Want to Love You"
- Released: July 4, 1981
- Studio: Sound Emporium (Nashville, Tennessee)
- Genre: Country
- Length: 3:03
- Label: MCA
- Songwriter: Roger Cook
- Producers: Don Williams, Garth Fundis

Don Williams singles chronology
"Falling Again" (1981)	"Miracles" (1981)	"If I Needed You" (1981)

"Miracles" is a song written by Roger Cook, and recorded by American country music artist Don Williams. It was released in July 1981 as the first single from the album Especially for You. The song reached number 4 on the Billboard Hot Country Singles & Tracks chart.

== Content ==
The song is a ballad which interpolates the melody of Symphony No. 9 by Antonín Dvořák.

A review in Record World was favorable, stating that "Deep, warm and sincere, his vocal makes this ballad a multi-format winner."

== Chart performance ==
Chart (1981)	Peak position
US Hot Country Songs (Billboard)	4
U.S. Billboard Hot Adult Contemporary Tracks	32
Canadian RPM Country Tracks	3
