= Listen to the Radio =

Single by Don Williams

from the album Listen to the Radio
- B-side: "Only Love"
- Released: April 1982
- Genre: Country
- Length: 3:12
- Label: MCA
- Songwriter(s): Fred Knipe
- Producer(s): Don Williams, Garth Fundis

Don Williams singles chronology
"Lord, I Hope This Day Is Good" (1981)	"Listen to the Radio" (1982)	"Mistakes" (1982)

"Listen to the Radio" is a song written by Fred Knipe, and recorded by American country music artist Don Williams. It was released in April 1982 as the first single and title track from his album Listen to the Radio. The song reached number 3 on the Billboard Hot Country Singles chart and number 1 on the RPM Country Tracks chart in Canada.

== Charts ==
Chart (1982)	Peak position
US Hot Country Songs (Billboard)	3
Canadian RPM Country Tracks	1
