= Walkin' a Broken Heart =

Single by Don Williams

from the album Cafe Carolina
- B-side: "True Blue Hearts"
- Released: January 5, 1985
- Studio: Sound Emporium (Nashville, Tennessee)
- Genre: Country
- Length: 3:04
- Label: MCA
- Songwriter(s): Dennis Linde, Alan Rush
- Producer(s): Don Williams, Garth Fundis

Don Williams singles chronology
| "Maggie's Dream" (1984) | "Walkin' a Broken Heart" (1985) | "It's Time for Love" (1985) |

"Walkin' a Broken Heart" is a song written by Dennis Linde and Alan Rush, and recorded by American country music artist Don Williams. It was released in January 1985 as the third single from the album Cafe Carolina. The song reached number 2 on the Billboard Hot Country Singles & Tracks chart.

== Chart performance ==
| Chart (1985) | Peak position |
|---|---|
| US Hot Country Songs (Billboard) | 2 |
| Canadian RPM Country Tracks | 3 |
