= Work Song (Corbin/Hanner song) =

Single by Corbin/Hanner

from the album Black and White Photograph
- B-side: "Wild Winds"
- Released: June 1990
- Genre: Country
- Length: 2:57
- Label: Mercury
- Songwriter: Bob Corbin
- Producers: Bob Corbin; Dave Hanner; Harold Shedd

Corbin/Hanner singles chronology
"One Fine Morning" (1982)	"Work Song" (1990)	"Concrete Cowboy" (1991)

"Work Song" is a song by American country music duo Corbin/Hanner. Originally recorded in the 1970s, it was re-recorded in 1982 and 1990. The 1990 version was issued as a single from the duo's third studio album, Black and White Photograph. Lyrically, the song is about the working class in Pittsburgh. The song was also made into a music video filmed in that city. "Work Song" received generally favorable reception for its lyrics and sound, with many critics considering the song to have a reggae influence.

== History ==
Corbin/Hanner originally recorded "Work Song" in the mid-1970s as a demo for Columbia Records. They recorded the song again in the 1980s on their Alfa Records album For the Sake of the Song, and Pake McEntire also recorded a version for his 1988 RCA Records album My Whole World. Upon signing with Mercury Records at the end of the 1980s, Corbin/Hanner recorded the song again and issued it as a single from their first Mercury album, Black and White Photograph. The commercial release featured "Wild Winds" as the B-side.

Bob Corbin, one-half of the duo, wrote the song and provides the lead vocals. Lyrically, the song is about the working class in Pittsburgh, the duo's hometown. Because of its theming, the song remained popular with listeners in the Pittsburgh area. Cash Box magazine reported in 1992 that, over two years after the song's release, it was one of the most popular requests for country stations in the Pittsburgh area.

== Critical reception ==
"Work Song" received general critical favor for its lyrical content, with many critics also noting the song's reggae sound. Jack Hurst of the Chicago Tribune describes the song as "a combination of rhythms, lyrics, and vocal harmonies that fuse the muscle and fire of the Steel City" (a nickname of Pittsburgh). D.P. Breckenridge, in a review of For the Sake of the Song for The Kansas City Star, described the song as "an upbeat attempt at hillbilly reggae". An uncredited review in Cash Box stated that the song "combines the sound of the Bahamas with high-tech country". Lisa Smith and Cyndi Hoelzle of Gavin Report also noted reggae influence in the production, and called it "a great working person's song that morning shows will love."

== Music video ==
The song's music video was directed by Marius Penczner, and filmed in Pittsburgh. According to Close Up, a magazine published by the Country Music Association, it was the first video by a country music artist to feature time-lapse photography.

== Chart performance ==
"Work Song" was Corbin/Hanner's first chart entry since 1982. The song debuted on the Billboard Hot Country Singles & Tracks (now called Hot Country Songs) chart dated August 11, 1990. It charted for eight weeks and peaked at number 55.

Chart (1990)	Peak position
Canada Country Tracks (RPM)	81
U.S. Hot Country Songs (Billboard)	55
U.S. Country National Airplay (Radio & Records)	38
