= That's the Thing About Love =

Single by Don Williams

from the album Cafe Carolina
- B-side: "I'm Still Looking for You"
- Released: March 1984
- Studio: Sound Emporium (Nashville, Tennessee)
- Genre: Country
- Length: 3:38
- Label: MCA
- Songwriter(s): Richard Leigh; Gary Nicholson
- Producer(s): Don Williams

Don Williams singles chronology
"Stay Young" (1983)	"That's the Thing About Love" (1984)	"Maggie's Dream" (1984)

"That's the Thing About Love" is a song written by Richard Leigh and Gary Nicholson, and recorded by American country music artist Don Williams. It was released in March 1984 as the first single from the album Cafe Carolina. The song was Williams' sixteenth number one on the country chart. The single stayed at number one for a week and spent a total of thirteen weeks on the chart.

== Charts ==
=== Weekly charts ===
Chart (1984)	Peak position
US Hot Country Songs (Billboard)	1
Canadian RPM Country Tracks	1

=== Year-end charts ===
Chart (1984)	Position
US Hot Country Songs (Billboard)	14
