= Lord Have Mercy on a Country Boy =

Single by Don Williams

from the album True Love
- B-side: "Jamaica Farewell"
- Released: May 1991
- Genre: Country
- Length: 2:59
- Label: RCA Nashville
- Songwriter: Bob McDill
- Producers: Don Williams, Garth Fundis

Don Williams singles chronology
"True Love" (1991)	"Lord Have Mercy on a Country Boy" (1991)	"It's Who You Love" (1992)

"Lord Have Mercy on a Country Boy" is a song written by Bob McDill, and recorded by American country music artist Don Williams. It was released in May 1991 as the third single from his album True Love. The song was Williams' last top ten single, peaking at no. 7 on Hot Country Songs and no. 17 on Canadian RPM Country Tracks.

The song has been covered by a number of artists, most notably Josh Turner on his 2006 album Your Man.

== Chart performance ==
Chart (1991)	Peak position
Canada Country Singles (RPM)	17
US Hot Country Songs (Billboard)	7

=== Year-end charts ===
Chart (1991)	Position
US Country Songs (Billboard)	58
