= Señorita (Don Williams song) =

Single by Don Williams

from the album New Moves
- B-side: "Send Her Roses"
- Released: February 7, 1987
- Genre: Country
- Length: 4:12
- Label: Capitol
- Songwriter(s): Danny Flowers, Hank DeVito
- Producer(s): Don Williams, Garth Fundis

Don Williams singles chronology
| "Then It's Love" (1986) | "Señorita" (1987) | "I'll Never Be in Love Again" (1987) |

"Señorita" is a song written by Danny Flowers and Hank DeVito and recorded by American country music artist Don Williams. It was released in February 1987 as the fourth single from the album New Moves. The song reached number 9 on the Billboard Hot Country Singles & Tracks chart.

== Chart performance ==
| Chart (1987) | Peak position |
|---|---|
| US Hot Country Songs (Billboard) | 9 |
| Canadian RPM Country Tracks | 12 |
