= You're My Best Friend (album) =

Studio album by Don Williams
- Released: April 1975
- Studio: Jack Clement Recording (Nashville, Tennessee)
- Genre: Country
- Length: 28:38
- Label: ABC/Dot
- Producer: Allen Reynolds (tracks 2, 3, 9), Don Williams (all tracks)

Don Williams chronology
Don Williams Vol. III (1974)	You're My Best Friend (1975)	Harmony (1975)

Singles from You're My Best Friend
- 1. "You're My Best Friend" Released: 1975; 2. "(Turn Out The Light And) Love Me Tonight" Released: 1975

You're My Best Friend is the fourth studio album by American country music singer-songwriter Don Williams. Released in April 1975 on the ABC-Dot label, the album reached number five on the US Country Albums chart. "You're My Best Friend" and "(Turn Out the Light And) Love Me Tonight" were released as singles in 1975, both reaching number one on the Billboard country singles chart.

== Background ==
The previous year, Don Williams achieved his first number-one single with the song "I Wouldn't Want to Live If You Didn't Love Me". He teamed up again with regular collaborators, including Bob McDill, Allen Reynolds, Dickey Lee and Wayland Holyfield to craft another chart success.

== Track listing ==
from the original vinyl

No.	Title	Writer(s)	Length
1.	"You're My Best Friend"	Wayland Holyfield	2:43
2.	"Help Yourselves to Each Other"	Bob McDill	2:29
3.	"I Don't Wanna Let Go"	Holyfield	3:12
4.	"Sweet Fever"	Dickey Lee, McDill	2:17
5.	"Someone Like You"	Lee, McDill	3:02
6.	"(Turn Out the Light And) Love Me Tonight"	McDill	2:18
7.	"Where Are You"	Don Williams	2:51
8.	"Tempted"	Al Turney	3:27
9.	"You're the Only One"	Williams	2:44
10.	"Reason to Be"	Williams	3:02

== Personnel ==
- Joe Allen - bass guitar
- Jim Colvard - acoustic guitar, electric guitar
- Lloyd Green - steel guitar, dobro
- Shane Keister - keyboards
- Kenny Malone - drums, conga, marimba
- Danny Flowers - harmonica
- Don Williams - acoustic guitar
- Jerry Stembridge - acoustic guitar, electric guitar

== Charts ==
=== Weekly charts ===
Chart (1975)	Peak position
US Top Country Albums (Billboard)	5

=== Year-end charts ===
Chart (1975)	Position
US Top Country Albums (Billboard)	26
