= Black and White Photograph =

Studio album by Corbin/Hanner
- Released: 1990
- Genre: Country
- Label: Mercury
- Producer: Bob Corbin; Dave Hanner; Harold Shedd

Corbin/Hanner chronology
Son of America (1982)	Black and White Photograph (1990)	Just Another Hill (1992)

Black and White Photograph is an album by American country music duo Corbin/Hanner. It was released in 1990 via Mercury Records Nashville. The album contains the singles "Work Song" and "Concrete Cowboy".

== Content ==
Bob Corbin and Dave Hanner had recorded in the 1980s as the Corbin/Hanner Band, but broke up after the closure of their label Alfa Records. At the end of the 1980s, record producer and music executive Harold Shedd encouraged the two to reunite as a duo, as he was a fan of their music. Shedd co-produced the project with the duo. Corbin and Hanner wrote five songs each, and sang lead vocals on their respective compositions. The album's name is derived from a lyric in the closing track, "Scooter, Michael, Danny, and Me." The project accounted for three singles, the former two of which appeared on Billboard Hot Country Songs. These were "Work Song" at number 55, and "Concrete Cowboy" at number 59. Corbin/Hanner had previously recorded "Work Song" in the 1980s, and Pake McEntire also cut the song. Released last was "One More Night".

== Critical reception ==
Jack Hurst of the Chicago Tribune Hurst thought the project had a "rock-oriented sound" and strong lyrics, highlighting those of the singles and "Scooter, Michael, Danny, and Me" in particular.

== Track listing ==
1. "Work Song" (Bob Corbin) - 2:57
2. "Everywhere" (Dave Hanner) - 3:29
3. "When You Love in Vain" (Corbin) - 4:28
4. "Bon Ton Roulette" (Corbin) - 3:11
5. "When Bonds Begin to Break" (Hanner) - 3:47
6. "Wild Winds" (Hanner) - 4:23
7. "Concrete Cowboy" (Corbin) - 2:50
8. "You'll Never See My Love Come Down" (Hanner) - 3:23
9. "One More Night" (Hanner) - 3:12
10. "Scooter, Michael, Danny, and Me" (Corbin) - 3:26

== Personnel ==
Corbin/Hanner

- Bob Corbin - vocals, acoustic guitar, synthesizer
- Dave Hanner - vocals, electric guitar, mandolin, synthesizer

Additional musicians

- Costo Davis - synthesizer
- Owen Hale - drums
- Brent Mason - electric guitar, acoustic guitar
- Kip Paxton - background vocals
- Larry Paxton - bass guitar
- Matt Rollings - piano, electric piano, pump organ
- Brent Rowan - electric guitar, electric sitar
- Steve Turner - drums
- John Willis - electric guitar, acoustic guitar, mandolin

Technical

- Bob Corbin - producer
- Jim Cotton - recording, mixing
- Dave Hanner - producer
- Michael McCarthy - assistant
- Joe Scaife - recording, mixing
- Harold Shedd - producer
- Hank Williams - mastering
