= One Good Well (album) =

Studio album by Don Williams
- Released: April 28, 1989
- Recorded: late 1988
- Genre: Country
- Length: 35:36
- Label: RCA
- Producer: Don Williams, Garth Fundis

Don Williams chronology
| Traces (1987) | One Good Well (1989) | True Love (1990) |

One Good Well is the seventeenth studio album by American country music artist Don Williams. It was released on April 28, 1989, via RCA Records. The album includes the singles "One Good Well", "I've Been Loved by the Best", "Just as Long as I Have You" and "Maybe That's All It Takes".

== Track listing ==
| No. | Title | Writer(s) | Length |
|---|---|---|---|
| 1. | "Learn to Let Go" | Mike Reid, Rory Bourke | 3:32 |
| 2. | "One Good Well" | Reid, Kent Robbins | 2:47 |
| 3. | "Cryin' Eyes" | Don Williams | 3:33 |
| 4. | "I've Been Loved by the Best" | Bob McDill, Paul Harrison | 3:31 |
| 5. | "Broken Heartland" | Paul Nelson, Gene Nelson | 3:19 |
| 6. | "Just as Long as I Have You" | Dave Loggins, J. D. Martin | 3:18 |
| 7. | "Why Get Up" | Bill Carter, Ruth Ellsworth | 3:10 |
| 8. | "Maybe That's All It Takes" | Beth Nielsen Chapman | 4:13 |
| 9. | "We're All the Way" | Williams | 2:20 |
| 10. | "Flowers Won't Grow (In Gardens Of Stone)" | McDill, Bucky Jones | 2:38 |
| 11. | "If You Love Me, Won't You Love Me Like You Love Me" | McDill, Jones | 4:16 |
| Total length: | | | 35:36 |

== Chart performance ==
| Chart (1989) | Peak position |
|---|---|
| US Top Country Albums (Billboard) | 54 |
