= Old Coyote Town =

Single by Don Williams

from the album Traces
- B-side: "You Love Me Through It All"
- Released: January 17, 1989
- Genre: Country
- Length: 3:46
- Label: Capitol
- Songwriter(s): Larry Boone, Paul Nelson, Gene Nelson
- Producer(s): Don Williams, Garth Fundis

Don Williams singles chronology
"Desperately" (1988)	"Old Coyote Town" (1989)	"One Good Well" (1989)

"Old Coyote Town" is a song recorded by American country music artist Don Williams. It was released in January 1989 as the fourth single from the album Traces. The song reached number 5 on the Billboard Hot Country Singles & Tracks chart. The song previously appeared on co-writer Larry Boone's 1988 album Swingin' Doors, Sawdust Floors, and was the B-side to that album's single "Wine Me Up". Boone wrote the song with Paul Nelson and Gene Nelson.

== Chart performance ==
Chart (1989)	Peak position
US Hot Country Songs (Billboard)	5

=== Year-end charts ===
Chart (1989)	Position
Canada Country Tracks (RPM)	24
US Country Songs (Billboard)	77
