= We've Got a Good Fire Goin' =

Single by Don Williams

from the album New Moves
- B-side: "Shot Full of Love"
- Released: January 18, 1986
- Genre: Country
- Length: 3:15
- Label: Capitol
- Songwriter(s): Dave Loggins
- Producer(s): Don Williams, Garth Fundis

Don Williams singles chronology
"It's Time for Love" (1985)	"We've Got a Good Fire Goin'" (1986)	"Heartbeat in the Darkness" (1986)

"We've Got a Good Fire Goin'" is a song written by Dave Loggins, and recorded by American country music artist Don Williams. It was released in January 1986 as the first single from the album New Moves. The song reached number 3 on the Billboard Hot Country Singles & Tracks chart.

== Chart performance ==
Chart (1986)	Peak position
US Hot Country Songs (Billboard)	3
Canadian RPM Country Tracks	2
