= If Hollywood Don't Need You (Honey I Still Do) =

Single by Don Williams

from the album Listen to the Radio
- B-side: "Help Yourselves to Each Other"
- Released: November 1982
- Genre: Country
- Length: 3:12
- Label: MCA
- Songwriter(s): Bob McDill
- Producer(s): Don Williams; Garth Fundis

Don Williams singles chronology
"Mistakes" (1982)	"If Hollywood Don't Need You (Honey I Still Do)" (1982)	"Love Is on a Roll" (1983)

"If Hollywood Don't Need You (Honey I Still Do)" is a song written by Bob McDill, and recorded by American country music artist Don Williams. It was released in November 1982 as the third single from the album Listen to the Radio. The song was Williams' thirteenth number one single on the country chart. The single went to number one for one week and spent a total of twelve weeks on the chart.

== Content ==
The song contains a tribute to Burt Reynolds saying: "Oh, and if you see Burt Reynolds would you shake his hand for me / And tell ol' Burt I've seen all his movies / Well, I hope you make the big time, I hope your dreams come true / But if Hollywood don't need you, honey, I still do"

== Charts ==
=== Weekly charts ===
Chart (1982–1983)	Peak position
US Hot Country Songs (Billboard)	1
Canadian RPM Country Tracks	1

=== Year-end charts ===
Chart (1983)	Position
US Hot Country Songs (Billboard)	23
