= True Love (Don Williams song) =

Single by Don Williams

from the album True Love
- B-side: "Learn to Let It Go"
- Released: January 1991
- Genre: Country
- Length: 2:52
- Label: RCA
- Songwriter: Pat Alger
- Producers: Don Williams, Garth Fundis

Don Williams singles chronology
"Back in My Younger Days" (1990)	"True Love" (1991)	"Lord Have Mercy on a Country Boy" (1991)

"True Love" is a song written by Pat Alger, and recorded by American country music artist Don Williams. It was released in January 1991 as the second single and title track from Williams' album True Love. The song reached number 4 on the Billboard Hot Country Singles & Tracks chart in April 1991.

== Chart performance ==
Chart (1991)	Peak position
Canada Country Singles (RPM)	5
US Hot Country Songs (Billboard)	4

=== Year-end charts ===
Chart (1991)	Position
Canada Country Tracks (RPM)	62
US Country Songs (Billboard)	49
