= Especially for You (Don Williams album) =

Studio album by Don Williams
- Released: June 26, 1981
- Studio: Sound Emporium (Nashville, Tennessee)
- Genre: Country
- Label: MCA
- Producer: Don Williams, Garth Fundis, Brian Ahern

Don Williams chronology
I Believe in You (1980)	Especially for You (1981)	Listen to the Radio (1982)

Especially for You is the eleventh studio album by American country music artist Don Williams. It was released in 1981 (see 1981 in country music). Three singles were released from the album which all reached the top ten. These were "Miracles" (No. 4), "If I Needed You" (with Emmylou Harris) (No. 3) and "Lord, I Hope This Day Is Good" (No. 1). The album peaked at No. 5 in the U.S. and reached No. 109 on the Billboard 200. This album, paired with his previous album, I Believe in You, were re-released on one CD in 1989.

== Content ==
Many songs on this album are covers of earlier songs or would later be covered by other artists. "Fair-weather Friends" was released by its co-writer, Johnny Cash in 1982 on his album, The Adventures of Johnny Cash. "Years from Now" was previously recorded by Bobbi Humphrey in 1977 and would later be made famous by Dr. Hook. "Lord, I Hope This Day is Good" has been covered by Anne Murray and by Lee Ann Womack on her 2000 album, I Hope You Dance. The duet with Emmylou Harris, "If I Needed You", was first recorded by Townes Van Zandt on his 1972 album, The Late Great Townes Van Zandt.

== Track listing ==
No.	Title	Writer(s)	Length
1.	"Fairweather Friends"	Joe Allen, Johnny Cash	4:14
2.	"I Don't Want to Love You"	Bob McDill	4:04
3.	"Years from Now"	Roger Cook, Charles Cochran	2:41
4.	"Lord, I Hope This Day Is Good"	Dave Hanner	4:06
5.	"Especially You"	Rick Beresford	2:30
6.	"If I Needed You" (duet with Emmylou Harris)	Townes Van Zandt	3:25
7.	"Now and Then"	Wayland Holyfield	3:21
8.	"Smooth Talking Baby"	Dave Kirby, Red Lane	3:07
9.	"I've Got You to Thank for That"	Blake Mevis, Don Pfrimmer	2:32
10.	"Miracles"	Cook	3:01

== Personnel ==
from liner notes

- Don Williams - lead and backing vocals, acoustic guitar
- Joe Allen - electric and upright bass
- Charles Cochran - piano, organ, Prophet Synthesizer, string arrangements
- Roger Cook - ukulele and harmony vocals on "Miracles"
- Garth Fundis - harmony and backing vocals
- Lloyd Green - steel guitar
- David Kirby - acoustic guitar, electric guitar
- Shelley Kurland - violin solo on "Now and Then"
- Pat McLaughlin - mandolin
- Kenny Malone - conga, bongos, tambourine, shakers, drums
- Billy Sanford - acoustic guitar
- Biff Watson - synthesizer, gut-string guitar
- The Sheldon Kurland Strings - strings

Production

- All tracks produced by Don Williams and Garth Fundis except for "If I Needed You", which was co-produced with Brian Ahern.
- Recorded at Sound Emporium Studios by Garth Fundis and Gary Laney
- Remixed by Garth Fundis and Don Williams
- Mastered by Glenn Meadows at Masterfonics, Nashville

== Charts ==
=== Weekly charts ===
Chart (1981)	Peak position
US Billboard 200	109
US Top Country Albums (Billboard)	5

=== Year-end charts ===
Chart (1982)	Position
US Top Country Albums (Billboard)	37
