= Love Me Over Again =

Single by Don Williams

from the album Portrait
- B-side: "Circle Driveway"
- Released: December 1979
- Genre: Country
- Length: 2:56
- Label: MCA
- Songwriter: Don Williams
- Producers: Don Williams; Garth Fundis

Don Williams singles chronology
"It Must Be Love" (1979)	"Love Me Over Again" (1979)	"Good Ole Boys Like Me" (1980)

"Love Me Over Again" is a song written and recorded by American country music artist Don Williams. It was released in December 1979 as the first single from the album Portrait. The song was Williams' tenth number one on the country chart, and the only number one of his career in which he was the sole writer. The single went to number one for one week and spent twelve weeks on the country chart.

== Chart performance ==
Chart (1979–1980)	Peak position
US Hot Country Songs (Billboard)	1
Canadian RPM Country Tracks	1

=== Year-end charts ===
Chart (1980)	Position
US Hot Country Songs (Billboard)	16
