= Falling Again =

Single by Don Williams

from the album I Believe in You
- B-side: "I Keep Putting Off Getting Over You"
- Released: February 21, 1981
- Genre: Country
- Length: 2:50
- Label: MCA
- Songwriter(s): Bob McDill
- Producer(s): Don Williams, Garth Fundis

Don Williams singles chronology
"I Believe in You" (1980)	"Falling Again" (1981)	"Miracles" (1981)

"Falling Again" is a song written by Bob McDill, and recorded by American country music artist Don Williams. It was released in February 1981 as the second single from the album I Believe in You. The song reached number 6 on the Billboard Hot Country Singles & Tracks chart.

== Charts ==
=== Weekly charts ===
Chart (1981)	Peak position
US Hot Country Songs (Billboard)	6
U.S. Billboard Hot Adult Contemporary Tracks	39
Canadian RPM Country Tracks	3

=== Year-end charts ===
Chart (1981)	Position
US Hot Country Songs (Billboard)	50
