= You're My Best Friend (Don Williams song) =

Single by Don Williams

from the album You're My Best Friend
- B-side: "Where Are You"
- Released: April 1975
- Recorded: 1974
- Genre: Country
- Length: 2:43
- Label: ABC/Dot
- Songwriter(s): Wayland Holyfield
- Producer(s): Don Williams

Don Williams singles chronology
"The Ties That Bind" (1974)	"You're My Best Friend" (1975)	"(Turn Out the Light And) Love Me Tonight" (1975)

"You're My Best Friend" is a song written by Wayland Holyfield and recorded by American country music artist Don Williams. It was released in April 1975 as the first single and title track from the album You're My Best Friend. The song was Williams' second number-one hit on the Billboard Hot Country Singles chart in June 1975. It has since become one of Williams' signature songs, also reaching the UK Top 40.

== Chart performance ==
Chart (1975)	Peak position
US Hot Country Songs (Billboard)	1
Canadian RPM Country Tracks	1
South Africa (Springbok)	4
U.K. Singles Chart	35
Australia (Kent Music Report)	50
