= Love Is on a Roll =

Single by Don Williams

from the album Yellow Moon
- B-side: "I'll Take Your Love Anytime"
- Released: March 1983
- Genre: Country
- Length: 3:41
- Label: MCA
- Songwriter(s): Roger Cook; John Prine
- Producer(s): Don Williams; Garth Fundis

Don Williams singles chronology
| "If Hollywood Don't Need You (Honey I Still Do)" (1982) | "Love Is on a Roll" (1983) | "Nobody but You" (1983) |

"Love is on a Roll" is a song written by Roger Cook and John Prine, and recorded by American country music artist Don Williams. It was released in March 1983 as the first single from the album Yellow Moon. The song was Williams' fourteenth number one on the country chart. The single went to number one for one week and spent a total of twelve weeks on the country chart.

== Charts ==
=== Weekly charts ===
| Chart (1983) | Peak position |
|---|---|
| US Hot Country Songs (Billboard) | 1 |
| Canadian RPM Country Tracks | 1 |

=== Year-end charts ===
| Chart (1983) | Position |
|---|---|
| US Hot Country Songs (Billboard) | 25 |
