= I'll Never Be in Love Again =

Single by Don Williams

from the album New Moves
- B-side: "Send Her Roses"
- Released: June 6, 1987
- Genre: Country
- Length: 3:08
- Label: Capitol
- Songwriter(s): Bob Corbin
- Producer(s): Don Williams, Garth Fundis

Don Williams singles chronology
"Señorita" (1987)	"I'll Never Be in Love Again" (1987)	"I Wouldn't Be a Man" (1987)

"I'll Never Be in Love Again" is a song written by Bob Corbin, and recorded by American country music artist Don Williams. It was released in June 1987 as the fifth single from the album New Moves. The song reached number 4 on the Billboard Hot Country Singles & Tracks chart

== Charts ==
=== Weekly charts ===
Chart (1987)	Peak position
US Hot Country Songs (Billboard)	4
Canadian RPM Country Tracks	15

=== Year-end charts ===
Chart (1987)	Position
US Hot Country Songs (Billboard)	30
