= Listen to the Radio (album) =

Studio album by Don Williams
- Released: March 26, 1982
- Genre: Country
- Length: 31:25
- Label: MCA
- Producer: Don Williams, Garth Fundis

Don Williams chronology
Especially for You (1981)	Listen to the Radio (1982)	Yellow Moon (1983)

Listen to the Radio is the twelfth studio album by American country music artist Don Williams. It was released on March 26, 1982, via MCA Records. The albums includes the singles "Listen to the Radio". "Mistakes" and "If Hollywood Don't Need You (Honey I Still Do)".

== Track listing ==
No.	Title	Writer(s)	Length
1.	"Listen to the Radio"	Fred Knipe	3:09
2.	"If Hollywood Don't Need You (Honey I Still Do)"	Bob McDill	3:11
3.	"Don't Stop Loving Me Now"	Sam Hogin, Mark True, Charles Cochran	3:10
4.	"Only Love"	Sandy Mason Theoret, Roger Cook	3:57
5.	"Fool, Fool Heart"	Jennifer Kimball	3:02
6.	"Mistakes"	Richard Feldman	2:52
7.	"I Can't Get to You from Here"	Knipe, Stephen D. Chandler	3:05
8.	"Standin' in a Sea of Teardrops"	McDill	3:23
9.	"If She Just Helps Me Get Over You"	Don Williams, Allen Reynolds	2:45
10.	"Help Yourselves to Each Other"	McDill, Reynolds	2:51

== Chart performance ==
Chart (1982)	Peak position
US Billboard 200	166
US Top Country Albums (Billboard)	6
