= Back in My Younger Days =

Single by Don Williams

from the album True Love
- B-side: "Diamonds to Dust"
- Released: September 1990
- Genre: Country
- Length: 3:14
- Label: RCA
- Songwriter: Danny Flowers
- Producers: Don Williams, Garth Fundis

Don Williams singles chronology
| "Maybe That's All It Takes" (1990) | "Back in My Younger Days" (1990) | "True Love" (1991) |

"Back in My Younger Days" is a song written by Danny Flowers, and recorded by American country music artist Don Williams. It was released in September 1990 as the first single from Williams' album True Love. The song reached number 2 on the Billboard Hot Country Singles & Tracks chart in November 1990 and number 1 on the RPM Country Tracks chart in Canada.

== Chart performance ==
| Chart (1990) | Peak position |
|---|---|
| Canada Country Singles (RPM) | 1 |
| US Hot Country Songs (Billboard) | 2 |

=== Year-end charts ===
| Chart (1990) | Position |
|---|---|
| Canada Country Tracks (RPM) | 38 |
