= Reflections (Don Williams album) =

Studio album by Don Williams
- Released: March 11, 2014
- Genre: Country
- Length: 35:11
- Label: Sugar Hill
- Producer: Garth Fundis; Don Williams

Don Williams chronology
And So It Goes (2012)	Reflections (2014)	Epilogue: The Cellar Tapes (2026)

Singles from Reflections
- 1. "I'll Be Here in the Morning" Released: 2014

Reflections is the twenty-fifth studio album by American country music artist Don Williams. It was released on March 11, 2014, via Sugar Hill Records.

== Background ==
Reflections is Williams' second album following his initial retirement from making new music in 2004.

The album features covers of notable songs by Townes Van Zandt, Guy Clark, Jesse Winchester, Steve Wariner, and Merle Haggard. It also sees Williams reunited with longtime producer Garth Fundis.

Reflections was the final album released before Williams died in September 2017. It was also his last release until 2026, when Epilogue: The Cellar Tapes will become the first posthumous release in May.

== Critical reception ==
Reflections received largely positive reviews, with Thom Jurek of AllMusic giving the album four out of five stars and Dave Heaton of PopMatters giving it a seven out of ten. Jurek praised Williams' ability to interpret the songs along with the "assured command of his voice". Heaton credited Williams' still-strong singing voice.

== Track listing ==
Reflections track listing
No.	Title	Writer(s)	Length
1.	"I'll Be Here in the Morning"	Townes Van Zandt	3:43
2.	"Talk Is Cheap"	Guy Clark; Morgane Hayes; Chris Stapleton	3:37
3.	"I Won't Give Up on You"	Britton Cameron; Jordyn Shellhart	3:09
4.	"Sing Me Back Home"	Merle Haggard	3:58
5.	"Working Man's Son"	Jim Collins; Bob Regan	2:56
6.	"Healing Hands"	Rex Benson; Steve Gillette	3:23
7.	"If I Were Free"	Jesse Winchester	2:44
8.	"Stronger Back"	Doug Gill	3:31
9.	"Back to the Simple Things"	Marty Dodson; Jennifer Hanson; Mark Nesler	3:12
10.	"The Answer"	Tony Arata; Steve Wariner	4:13
Total length:			35:11

== Charts ==
Weekly chart performance for "Reflections"
Chart (2014)	Peak position
UK Country Albums Chart (OCC)	1
US Billboard 200	124
US Top Country Albums (Billboard)	19
US Independent Albums (Billboard)	20
