= Bar Room Buddies =

Single by Merle Haggard and Clint Eastwood

from the album Bronco Billy (soundtrack)
- B-side: "Not So Great Train Robbery"
- Released: April 21, 1980
- Genre: Country
- Length: 2:16
- Label: Elektra
- Songwriters: Milton Brown; Cliff Crofford; Steve Dorff; Snuff Garrett
- Producer: Snuff Garrett

Merle Haggard singles chronology
"The Way I Am" (1980)	"Bar Room Buddies" (1980)	"Misery and Gin" (1980)

Clint Eastwood singles chronology
"Bar Room Buddies" (1980)	"Beers to You" (1980)

"Bar Room Buddies" is a song written by Milton Brown, Cliff Crofford, Steve Dorff and Snuff Garrett, and recorded by American country music artist Merle Haggard and actor Clint Eastwood. It was released in April 1980 and is featured on the soundtrack for the film Bronco Billy starring Eastwood. The single stayed at number one for one week and spent a total of thirteen weeks on the Billboard country charts.

== Chart performance ==
Chart (1980)	Peak position
US Hot Country Songs (Billboard)	1
Canadian RPM Country Tracks	1

=== Year-end charts ===
Chart (1980)	Position
US Country Songs (Billboard)	6
