= Just as Long as I Have You =

Single by Don Williams

from the album One Good Well
- B-side: "Why Get Up"
- Released: January 27, 1990
- Genre: Country
- Length: 3:19
- Label: RCA
- Songwriters: Dave Loggins, J.D. Martin
- Producers: Don Williams, Garth Fundis

Don Williams singles chronology
"I've Been Loved by the Best" (1989)	"Just as Long as I Have You" (1990)	"Maybe That's All It Takes" (1990)

"Just as Long as I Have You" is a song written by Dave Loggins and J.D. Martin. Loggins originally recorded the song with Gus Hardin in 1985. Their version peaked at number 72 on the Billboard Hot Country Singles chart.

The song was later covered by American country music artist Don Williams. It was released in January 1990 as the third single from Williams' album One Good Well. His version reached number 4 on the Billboard Hot Country Singles & Tracks chart.

== Chart performance ==
=== Gus Hardin and Dave Loggins ===
Chart (1985)	Peak position
US Hot Country Songs (Billboard)	72
Canadian RPM Country Tracks	52

=== Don Williams ===
Chart (1990)	Peak position
Canada Country Singles (RPM)	11
US Hot Country Songs (Billboard)	4

==== Year-end charts ====
Chart (1990)	Position
US Country Songs (Billboard)	44
