= Don Williams Vol. III =

Studio album by Don Williams
- Released: 1974
- Studios: Jack Clement Recording (Nashville, Tennessee); RCA Studio B (Nashville, Tennessee)
- Genre: Country
- Label: ABC/Dot
- Producer: Don Williams

Don Williams chronology
Don Williams Volume Two (1974)	Don Williams Vol. III (1974)	You're My Best Friend (1975)

Singles from Don Williams Vol. III
- 1. "I Wouldn't Want to Live If You Didn't Love Me" Released: 1974; 2. "The Ties that Bind" Released: 1974

Don Williams Vol. III is the third studio album by American country music singer Don Williams released in 1974 on the ABC/Dot label. The album reached number three on the US Country Albums chart. The titles from this album can also be found on his Images or Greatest Hits Volume One albums. "I Wouldn't Want to Live If You Didn't Love Me" and "The Ties that Bind" were released as singles in North America in 1974, with the former becoming Williams' first number-one country radio hit.

== Track listing ==
All tracks were composed by Don Williams, except where indicated.

No.	Title	Writer(s)	Length
1.	"I Wouldn't Want to Live If You Didn't Love Me"	Al Turney	2:57
2.	"Fly Away"		2:07
3.	"Ghost Story"	Joe Allen	2:41
4.	"Goodbye Really Isn't Good at All"		2:57
5.	"Such a Lovely Lady"		2:35
6.	"The Ties That Bind"	Vin Corso, Clyde Otis	2:36
7.	"When Will I Ever Learn"	Jim Rushing, Wayland Holyfield	2:53
8.	"Why Lord Goodbye"		2:14
9.	"I've Turned You to Stone"	Rushing	3:08
10.	"Lovin' Understandin' Man"	Rushing	2:47

== Personnel ==
- Joe Allen - bass
- Jimmy Colvard - electric guitar
- Lloyd Green - steel and Dobro
- Shane Keister - keyboard and Moog
- Kenny Malone - drums and marimba
- Tommy Smith - trumpet
- Buddy Spicher - fiddle
- Don Williams and Jimmy Colvard - acoustic guitars
- Don Williams - lead vocals

== Production ==
- Producer - Don Williams
- Engineer - Ronnie Dean
- Recorded at Jack Clement Recording Studio, RCA Studio B, Nashville, Tennessee.
