= (Turn Out the Light And) Love Me Tonight =

Single by Don Williams

from the album You're My Best Friend
- B-side: "Reason to Be"
- Released: August 1975
- Genre: Country
- Length: 2:22
- Label: ABC/Dot
- Songwriter(s): Bob McDill
- Producer(s): Don Williams

Don Williams singles chronology
| "You're My Best Friend" (1975) | "(Turn Out the Light And) Love Me Tonight" (1975) | "'Til the Rivers All Run Dry" (1975) |

"(Turn Out the Light And) Love Me Tonight" is a song written by Bob McDill and recorded by American country music artist Don Williams. It was released in August 1975 as the second single from the album You're My Best Friend. The song was Williams' ninth country hit and his third number one on the country chart. The single went to number one for one week and spent a total of 12 weeks on the country chart.

== Chart performance ==
| Chart (1975) | Peak position |
|---|---|
| US Hot Country Songs (Billboard) | 1 |
| Canadian RPM Country Tracks | 5 |

== Cover versions ==
- The song was covered by Ray Charles on his 1979 album Ain't It So.
- The song was covered by Kenny Chesney on his 1996 album Me and You.
