= Danny Flowers =

American songwriter (born 1948)

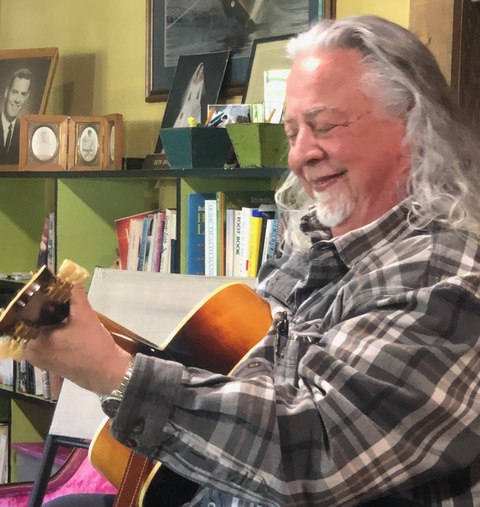
- Danny Flowers, April, 2022

Background information
- Born: Daniel Wayne Flowers; August 16, 1948 (age 77); Henderson, North Carolina
- Genres: Blues; country
- Occupations: Songwriter, musician, producer
- Instruments: Guitar, vocals, slide guitar, harmonica, dobro
- Years active: 1970–present

Daniel W. "Danny" Flowers (born 1948) is an American songwriter, recording artist, and multi-instrumentalist based in Nashville. He is known for creating songs that became hits for other artists. His best-known song is "Tulsa Time" recorded by Don Williams which became the number one U.S. Billboard country song of 1979. It was later recorded by Eric Clapton and reached number 30 on Billboard pop charts. Flowers' other songs written for Williams include "Back in My Younger Days", "Señorita", and "To Be Your Man". He co-wrote "Gulf Coast Highway", recorded by Emmylou Harris, Willie Nelson, and Nanci Griffith. Emmylou Harris' 1975 album, Pieces of the Sky derives its title from a lyric in Flowers' song, "Before Believing". His music has roots in the blues genre. His skill as a session guitarist distinguishes him from most of Nashville's other songwriters.

== Early life ==
Flowers was born and raised in Henderson, North Carolina. His father was a mortician who owned the Flowers Funeral Home in Henderson; the family lived in an apartment above the business. Flowers played high school football and was in a band that played after the games. He got his first guitar at age 17 and it became his primary inspiration for songwriting. He said, "Hardly anyone in my family supported me wanting to be a musician". His musical roots were in blues music. Flowers moved to Virginia Beach in 1968 after dropping out of school to perform on the blues and folk circuit, primarily as a harmonica player. He became proficient on slide guitar, dobro, and harmonica.

He moved to Nashville in the early 1970s and was signed by Wesley Rose to a publishing deal with Acuff-Rose. One of his first road tours was performing with Dobie Gray when Gray's song "Drift Away" was a hit single. He worked for producer Jack Clement and made demos for another writer, Don Williams. As Williams' commercial success took off, Williams hired Flowers to tour with him. Flowers said, “It was a wonderful experience.. . For five years, it was just a three-piece band... Don played guitar, we had a bass player, and I played electric guitar". The result was Flowers/Williams' successful 13 year musical association.

Flowers was living on Nashville's Blakemore Avenue, sharing the rent with singer Rodney Crowell and Chis Leuzinger. In her book, They Came to Nashville, Marshall Chapman recalled spending time with Flowers in that house listening to records and analyzing songs by various artists. The two were both performing separately in local clubs at the time. Chapman became a fan of Emmylou Harris' songs sung with Gram Parsons and was then surprised to learn that Flowers had had one of his songs, "Before Believing" recorded by Harris and that one of his lyrics became the album's title ("Pieces of the Sky "). She credited Flowers with telling her that she must learn to write songs to be successful in music.

== Writing "Tulsa Time" ==
In September, 1978, Flowers and the Don Williams band members were staying at a Sheraton Hotel in Tulsa, Oklahoma. A snowstorm had caused an interruption of their schedule. Flowers said, "We were all snowed in, and there was absolutely nothing to do. I was sitting there in my room, watching The Rockford Files with some hotel stationery beside me, just bored, and I started writing out some verses”. He reportedly spent only half an hour on it and the song had only two chords. Flowers said he intended to add another chord later, "but Don heard it and liked it the way it was."

About two months later, Flowers was performing with Williams in Nashville as the opening act for Eric Clapton. After the performance, Flowers and Williams went to Clapton's hotel room where the three men took turns playing songs. Flowers sang and played guitar on his new song, "Tulsa Time" with Williams singing harmony and Clapton playing slide guitar on a dobro. Clapton said, "I love that song and I want to record it right away". Williams said, "You can't record it— I'm going to record it". Both artists recorded the song, but Williams was first.

Williams' recording went to number one on the country singles chart, and became the number one Billboard country song of 1979. Clapton released two versions of the song and the second, a 1980 live recording, reached number 30 on the U.S. Billboard Hot 100 pop singles chart.

== Other projects ==
Flowers has been a session musician for Williams, Griffith, Vince Gill, Marshall Chapman, George Hamilton IV and Dobie Gray, as well as having toured with Williams, Gill, the Sweethearts of the Rodeo, the McCrary Sisters and others. In 1982, he recorded an album for MCA as a lead vocalist, recording with Don Williams' band members whom they called the "Scratch Band". Williams arranged for his band members to make an album of their own. It was entitled "The Scratch Band featuring Danny Flowers ". Flowers wrote or co-wrote all the tracks. It included Pat McInerney, Biff Watson and Dave Pomeroy. Flowers' demonstrated his skill on the harmonica in this band. He left Williams in 1985 and later played with Nanci Griffith, Aaron Tippin, and Russell Smith. While with Griffith, he created the "Blue Moon Orchestra" as her backing band.

Flowers' album, Forbidden Fruits and Vegetables was released in 2000; it included some rocking blues and many of his songs that had been covered by other artists including "Tulsa Time", "Before Believing" and his version of "Pacific Coast Highway" which he co-wrote with Nancy Griffith and James Hooker.

Music reviewer Dennis Reed pointed out that Flowers' physical appearance on the album cover of the "Forbidden" album was quite different from that on his next album in 2007,Tools for the Soul . The Forbidden album showed a much thinner Flowers with short hair, wearing a dark suit with a business look. The later Food for the Soul album cover revealed long hippie hair, some added pounds, and a full beard. In a 2014 documentary by The Songwriter (Nashville), Flowers was forthright in discussing that he had suffered from chemical dependency but now had decades of sobriety. From his Tools for the Soul album, the song "I Was a Burden" was a story of how dependency can be turned around. The song was recorded by the Blind Boys of Alabama featuring Lee Ann Womack.

In late 2014, Flowers began work on a new record, Anytime, Anywhere, Everywhere, for release in 2015. As of 2021, he is involved in making an R & B gospel album called The Truth Don't Lie with his wife, Mabel Pleasure Flowers, who plays a Hammond B-3. The two met in 2018 at a party at the home of fellow musician, Keb' Mo'.

== Discography ==
=== Songs written ===
- Anytime, Anywhere, Everywhere
- At the Open Door
- Back in My Younger Days
- Be Still My Heart
- Before Believing
- Born to Believe
- Breaking Point
- Everything Is Alright/Tulsa Time Reprise (with James Pennebaker)
- Free of That Today
- Gulf Coast Highway (with Nanci Griffith & James Hooker)
- Hang Around the House and Cry
- I Was a Burden
- I'm Holding On
- I've Had My Way Long Enough
- Jesus I Can't Hear Your Voice Today
- Keep on Livin'
- Nervous
- Off the Deep End
- Poor Bob
- Prayer Song (feat. Emmylou Harris)
- Read On
- Ready
- Ready to Cross Over
- Reason to Try
- Rededicating My Love to You
- Señorita
- Still Ain't Out of the Woods
- Tennessee Hideaway
- The Lord's Not Though Using Me Yet
- Till This Feeling Goes Away
- To Be Your Man
- Today I Choose to Shine
- Tools for the Soul (feat. Emmylou Harris)
- Tulsa Time
- UnGodly
- What Would the Father Say
- World Enough and Time
- You Are

=== Albums ===
- 2000: Forbidden Fruits and Vegetables
- 2007: Tools for the Soul
- 2018: I'm Holding On
- 2022: The Truth Don't Lie
