= Desperately (Don Williams song) =

Single by Don Williams

from the album Traces
- B-side: "You Love Me Through It All"
- Released: August 13, 1988
- Genre: Country
- Length: 3:10
- Label: Capitol
- Songwriter(s): Jamie O'Hara, Kevin Welch
- Producer(s): Don Williams, Garth Fundis

Don Williams singles chronology
"Another Place, Another Time" (1988)	"Desperately" (1988)	"Old Coyote Town" (1989)

"Desperately" is a song written by Jamie O'Hara and Kevin Welch, and recorded by American country music artist Don Williams. It was released in August 1988 as the third single from the album Traces. The song reached number 7 on the Billboard Hot Country Singles & Tracks chart.

== Charts ==
=== Weekly charts ===
Chart (1988)	Peak position
US Hot Country Songs (Billboard)	7
Canadian RPM Country Tracks	5

=== Year-end charts ===
Chart (1988)	Position
US Hot Country Songs (Billboard)	83
