= John Jarrard =

American songwriter

- Born: May 7, 1953; Gainesville, Georgia
- Origin: Nashville, Tennessee
- Died: February 1, 2001 (aged 47) Nashville, Tennessee
- Genres: Country
- Occupation: Songwriter
- Years active: 1983-2001

John Jarrard (May 7, 1953 – February 1, 2001) was an American country music songwriter. He wrote songs for Alabama, George Strait, Don Williams, and others.

== Biography ==
John Jarrard was born in Gainesville, Georgia on May 7, 1953. He worked as a disc jockey in his hometown, and moved to Nashville, Tennessee in 1974 after being persuaded by a girlfriend to attend a convention there. While in Nashville, he worked at a motel and recorded demos with his friend, songwriter Bruce Burch. Jarrard stopped working at the motel in 1979 after complications of diabetes, which led to him losing his eyesight before suffering total kidney failure which required a transplant.

His first No. 1 single as a songwriter was "Nobody but You" by Don Williams. Other artists who recorded his songs include Alabama, Tracy Lawrence, and George Strait. Overall, Jarrard had 11 number ones on the country singles charts. Jarrard continued to be affected by diabetes, eventually undergoing a second kidney transplant and having both legs amputated in 1997. He died on February 1, 2001, of respiratory failure.

== Singles composed by Jarrard ==
- Alabama — "There's No Way", "'You've Got' the Touch", "We Can't Love Like This Anymore"
- John Anderson — "Money in the Bank"
- John Berry — "What's in It for Me"
- Blackhawk — "I Sure Can Smell the Rain"
- Diamond Rio — "Mirror, Mirror"
- The Forester Sisters — "Lonely Alone"
- James House — "A Real Good Way to Wind Up Lonesome"
- Tracy Lawrence — "Is That a Tear"
- Neal McCoy — "They're Playin' Our Song"
- Pirates of the Mississippi — "Let the Joneses Win"
- Charley Pride — "Shouldn't It Be Easier Than This"
- Collin Raye — "My Kind of Girl"
- John Schneider — "What's a Memory Like You (Doing in a Love Like This)"
- George Strait — "Blue Clear Sky"
- Pam Tillis — "Deep Down"
- Rick Trevino — "See Rock City"
- Don Williams — "Nobody but You"
