= Lord, I Hope This Day Is Good =

Single by Don Williams

from the album Especially for You
- B-side: "Smooth Talkin' Baby"
- Released: November 1981
- Studio: Sound Emporium (Nashville, Tennessee)
- Genre: Country
- Length: 4:06
- Label: MCA
- Songwriter: Dave Hanner
- Producers: Don Williams; Garth Fundis

Don Williams singles chronology
| "If I Needed You" (1981) | "Lord, I Hope This Day Is Good" (1981) | "Listen to the Radio" (1982) |

"Lord, I Hope This Day is Good" is a song written by Dave Hanner, and recorded by American country music artist Don Williams. It was released in November 1981 as the third single from the album Especially for You. The song was Williams' twelfth number one on the country chart. The single stayed at number one for one week and spent a total of twenty weeks on the country music charts. Hanner also recorded the song as a member of Corbin/Hanner, who released it as the b-side to the 1982 single "One Fine Morning."

== Cover versions ==
- Anne Murray recorded a version of the song on her 1999 inspirational album.
- Lee Ann Womack also recorded a version of the song on her 2000 album I Hope You Dance.
- Keb' Mo' covered the song of the Williams tribute album Gentle Giants: The Songs of Don Williams.
- Brandon Rhyder recorded a cover on his album Live at Billy Bob's Texas.

== Charts ==
=== Weekly charts ===
| Chart (1981–1982) | Peak position |
|---|---|
| US Hot Country Songs (Billboard) | 1 |
| Canadian RPM Country Tracks | 1 |

=== Year-end charts ===
| Chart (1982) | Position |
|---|---|
| US Hot Country Songs (Billboard) | 12 |
