= I Believe in You (Don Williams album) =

Studio album by Don Williams
- Released: August 4, 1980
- Genre: Country
- Length: 30:42
- Label: MCA
- Producer: Don Williams, Garth Fundis

Don Williams chronology
Portrait (1979)	I Believe in You (1980)	Especially for You (1981)

I Believe in You is the tenth studio album by American country music artist Don Williams. It was released on August 4, 1980 via MCA Records. The album includes the singles "I Believe in You" and "Falling Again". the album was the winner of the 1981 Country Music Association Album of the Year award

== Track listing ==
All songs written by Bob McDill, except where noted.

No.	Title	Writer(s)	Length
1.	"Falling Again"		2:47
2.	"It's Good to See You"	Allan Taylor	3:19
3.	"I Want You Back Again"		2:50
4.	"Simple Song"		2:45
5.	"I Believe in You"	Sam Hogin, Roger Cook	4:04
6.	"Ain't It Amazing"		3:21
7.	"Just Enough Love (For One Woman)"	Danny Morrison, Dave Kirby	2:21
8.	"I Keep Putting Off Getting Over You"	Wayland Holyfield	2:58
9.	"Rainy Nights and Memories"	Holyfield, Jim Rushing	3:30
10.	"Slowly but Surely"		2:47

== Chart performance ==
Chart (1980)	Peak position
US Billboard 200	57
US Top Country Albums (Billboard)	2
Canadian RPM Country Albums	3
