= Good Ole Boys Like Me =

"Good Ole Boys Like me"

Single by Don Williams

from the album Portrait
- B-side: "We're All the Way"
- Released: March 29, 1980
- Genre: Country
- Length: 4:11
- Label: MCA
- Songwriter: Bob McDill
- Producers: Don Williams, Garth Fundis

Don Williams singles chronology
"Love Me Over Again" (1979)	"Good Ole Boys Like me" (1980)	"I Believe in You" (1980)

"Good Ole Boys Like Me" is a song written by Bob McDill, and recorded by American country music artist Don Williams. It was released in March 1980 as the second single from the album Portrait. The song reached number 2 on the Billboard Hot Country Singles & Tracks chart.

Numerous other music artists have also performed this song, including Joe Nichols and Volume Five.

== Charts ==
=== Weekly charts ===
Chart (1980)	Peak position
US Hot Country Songs (Billboard)	2
Canadian RPM Country Tracks	3

=== Year-end charts ===
Chart (1980)	Position
US Hot Country Songs (Billboard)	30
