= I Wouldn't Want to Live If You Didn't Love Me =

Single by Don Williams

from the album Don Williams Vol. III
- B-side: "Fly Away"
- Released: June 1974
- Recorded: April 1974
- Genre: Country
- Length: 3:00
- Label: Dot
- Songwriter(s): Al Turney
- Producer(s): Don Williams

Don Williams singles chronology
"Down the Road I Go" (1974)	"I Wouldn't Want to Live If You Didn't Love Me" (1974)	"The Ties That Bind" (1974)

"I Wouldn't Want to Live If You Didn't Love Me" is a song written by Al Turney, and recorded by American country music artist Don Williams. It was released in June 1974 as the first single from the album Don Williams Vol. III. The song was Williams' sixth release as a solo artist and his first of 21 number ones on the country singles chart in Billboard magazine. The single spent one week at the top and total of 12 weeks on the chart.

== Chart performance ==
Chart (1974)	Peak position
US Hot Country Songs (Billboard)	1
Canadian RPM Country Tracks	10
