= Cafe Carolina =

Studio album by Don Williams
- Released: May 1984
- Studio: Sound Emporium (Nashville, Tennessee)
- Genre: Country
- Label: MCA
- Producer: Don Williams, Garth Fundis

Don Williams chronology
The Best of Don Williams Volume III (1984)	Cafe Carolina (1984)	Greatest Hits Volume IV (1986)

Singles from Cafe Carolina
- 1. "That's the Thing About Love" Released: March 1984; 2. "Maggie's Dream" Released: September 1, 1984; 3. "Walkin' a Broken Heart" Released: January 5, 1985; 4. "It's Time for Love" Released: October 12, 1985

Professional ratings
Review scores
Source	Rating
Allmusic	3/5 stars

Cafe Carolina is the fourteenth studio album by American country music artist Don Williams. It was released in May 1984 via MCA Records. The album peaked at number 13 on the Billboard Top Country Albums chart.

== Track listing ==
1. "The Only Game in Town" (Joe Allen, Ralph Murphy)
2. "Walkin' a Broken Heart" (Dennis Linde, Alan Rush)
3. "Maggie's Dream" (Dave Loggins, Lisa Silver)
4. "That's the Thing About Love" (Richard Leigh, Gary Nicholson)
5. "Leaving" (Don Williams)
6. "Beautiful Woman" (Graham Lyle)
7. "True Blue Hearts" (Williams)
8. "I'll Never Need Another You" (Ronnie Rogers)
9. "It's Time for Love" (Bob McDill, Hunter Moore)
10. "I'll Be Faithful to You" (Paul Kennerley)

== Charts ==
=== Weekly charts ===
Chart (1984)	Peak position
Canadian Country Albums (RPM)	1
US Top Country Albums (Billboard)	13

=== Year-end charts ===
Chart (1984)	Position
US Top Country Albums (Billboard)	46

== Personnel ==
- Piano & Organ: Charles Cochran
- Bass: Joe Allen
- Drums & Percussion: Kenny Malone
- Acoustic Guitars: Billy Sanford, Don Williams
- Electric Guitars: Billy Sanford, Steve Gibson
- Saxophone: Jim Horn
- Steel Guitar: Lloyd Green
- Lead Vocals: Don Williams
- Harmony Vocals: Garth Fundis, Don Williams

Production

- Arrangements for Violins, Violas and Cellos: Charles Cochran
- String Section: Nashville String Machine
- Recorded at: Sound Emporium Studios, Nashville, Tennessee
- Recording Engineers: Gary Laney & Garth Fundis
- Mastered by: Glenn Meadows at Masterfonics, Nashville
- Album Photography: McGuire
- Album Art Direction: John Baeder
