= I Believe in You (Don Williams song) =

Single by Don Williams

from the album I Believe in You
- B-side: "It Only Rains on Me"
- Released: August 1980
- Genre: Country
- Length: 4:04
- Label: MCA
- Songwriters: Roger Cook; Sam Hogin
- Producers: Don Williams; Garth Fundis

Don Williams singles chronology
"Good Ole Boys Like Me" (1980)	"I Believe in You" (1980)	"Falling Again" (1981)

"I Believe in You" is a song written by Roger Cook and Sam Hogin, and recorded by American country music artist Don Williams. It was released in August 1980 as the first single and title track from the album I Believe in You.

American singer and actress Bette Midler covered the song for her 1995 studio album Bette of Roses.

== Commercial performance ==
The song was Williams' eleventh number 1 on Billboard's country chart. The single stayed at number 1 for two weeks and spent 12 weeks on the country chart. "I Believe in You" was Don Williams' only Top 40 entry, where it peaked at number 24. The song has sold 286,000 downloads in the United States in the digital era.

The song was also a hit in Europe and Australia. It was best received in New Zealand, where it reached number four on the pop singles chart and is ranked as the 38th biggest hit of 1981.

== Charts ==
=== Weekly charts ===
Chart (1980)	Peak position
US Hot Country Songs (Billboard)	1
U.S. Billboard Hot Adult Contemporary Tracks	8
Australia (Kent Music Report)	20
Belgian VRT Top 30	21
Canadian RPM Country Tracks	1
Canadian RPM Adult Contemporary Tracks	7
Dutch Top 40	23
New Zealand Singles Chart	4

=== Year-end charts ===
Year-end chart performance for "I Believe in You"
Chart (1981)	Position
Australia (Kent Music Report)	90
