= Don Williams =

American country music singer-songwriter (1939–2017)

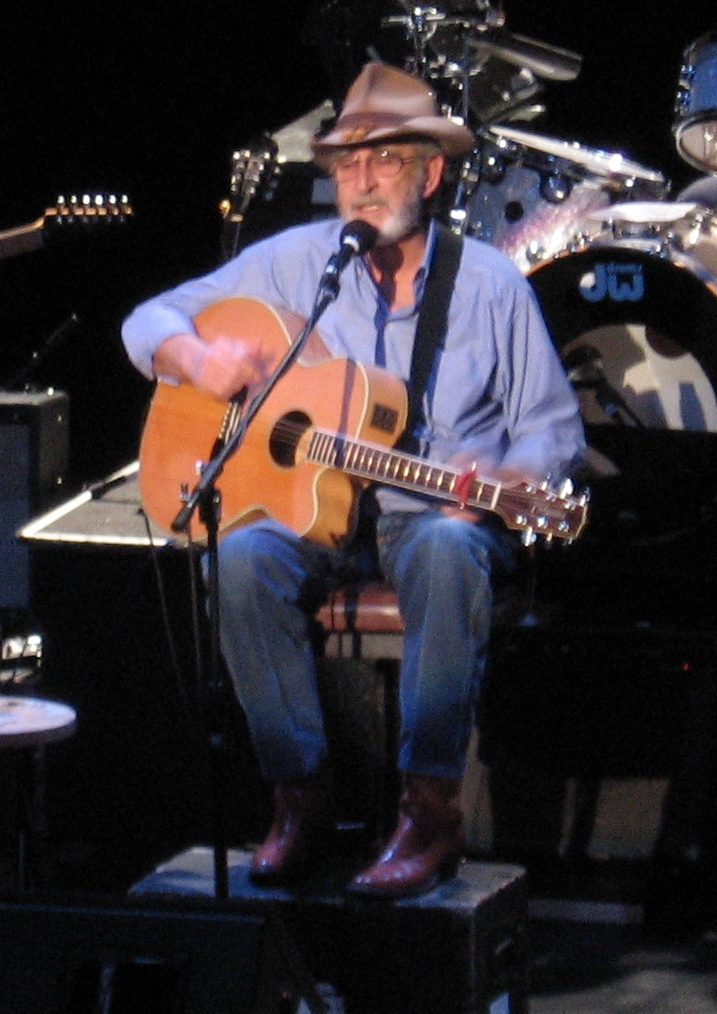
- Williams performing in 2006

Background information
- Born: Donald Ray Williams; May 27, 1939; Floydada, Texas, U.S.
- Died: September 8, 2017 (aged 78) Mobile, Alabama, U.S.
- Genre: Country
- Occupations: Singer-songwriter, actor
- Instruments: Vocals, guitar, piano
- Years active: 1964–2006; 2010–2016
- Labels: Columbia, JMI Records, Dot, ABC, MCA, Capitol, RCA, American Harvest, Giant, Koch, Vanguard, Sugar Hill Records
- Formerly of: Pozo-Seco Singers
- Website: www.don-williams.com
- Military career
- Allegiance: United States
- Branch: United States Army
- Unit: United States Army Security Agency

Donald Ray Williams (May 27, 1939 – September 8, 2017) was an American country music singer, songwriter, and 2010 inductee into the Country Music Hall of Fame. He began his solo career in 1971, singing popular ballads and amassing 17 number-one country hits. His straightforward yet smooth bass-baritone voice, soft tones, and imposing build earned him the nickname "The Gentle Giant". In 1975, Williams starred in a movie with Burt Reynolds and Jerry Reed called W.W. and the Dixie Dancekings.

Williams has had a strong influence over a variety of performers of different genres. His songs have been recorded by singers such as Johnny Cash, Eric Clapton, Ray Scott, Juice Newton, Leon Russell, Lefty Frizzell, Josh Turner, Sonny James, Alison Krauss, Billy Dean, Charley Pride, Kenny Rogers, Lambchop, Alan Jackson, Tomeu Penya, Telly Savalas, Waylon Jennings, Pete Townshend, and Tortoise with Bonnie "Prince" Billy. His music is also popular internationally, including in the UK, Australia, New Zealand, Ireland, Ukraine, India, Ethiopia, Cameroon, Nigeria, Ghana, Kenya, Malawi, South Africa, Sierra Leone, Tanzania, Uganda, Zambia, Namibia, and Zimbabwe. In 2010, the Country Music Association inducted Don Williams into the Country Music Hall of Fame.

== Early years ==
Williams was born the youngest of three sons, on May 27, 1939, in Floydada, Texas, United States. His parents were Loveta Mae (née Lambert; 1914–2007) and James Andrew "Jim" Williams (1898–1982). He grew up in Portland, Texas, and graduated from Gregory-Portland High School in 1958. After Williams's parents divorced, Loveta Williams remarried, first to Chester Lang and then to Robert Bevers.

On July 20, 1963, Williams's eldest brother Kenneth died from electrocution when he accidentally touched a live wire. He was 29 years old.

Prior to forming the folk-pop group Pozo-Seco Singers, Williams served with the United States Army Security Agency for two years. After an honorable discharge, he worked various odd jobs to support his family and himself.

With the Pozo-Seco Singers, Williams, alongside Susan Taylor and Lofton Cline, recorded several records for Columbia Records. He remained with the group until 1969; it disbanded the following year.

== Solo career ==
After the Pozo-Seco Singers disbanded, Williams briefly worked outside the music industry. Soon, however, Williams resumed his career in music. In December 1971, Williams signed on as a songwriter for Jack Clement with Jack Music Inc. In 1972, Williams inked a contract with JMI Records as a solo country artist. His 1974 song "We Should Be Together" reached No. 5, and he then signed with ABC/Dot Records. In 1975, with the release of his fourth album, he saw two country No. 1 hits: the title track "You're My Best Friend" on June 21 and "(Turn Out the Light And) Love Me Tonight" on November 1. At the height of the country and western boom in the UK in 1976, he had Top 40 pop chart hits with "You're My Best Friend" and "I Recall a Gypsy Woman".

His first single with ABC/Dot, "I Wouldn't Want to Live If You Didn't Love Me", became a No. 1 hit, and it was the first of a string of Top 10 hits he had between 1974 and 1991. Only four of his 46 singles did not make it to the Top 10 during that time.

"I Believe in You", written by Roger Cook and Sam Hogin, was Williams's 11th No. 1 on the country chart. It was his only Top 40 chart entry in the U.S., where it peaked at No. 24. It was also a hit in Australia, New Zealand, and Europe.

Williams had some minor roles in Burt Reynolds movies. In 1975, he appeared as a member of the Dixie Dancekings band in the movie W.W. and the Dixie Dancekings, alongside Reynolds. Williams also appeared as himself in the Universal Pictures movie Smokey and the Bandit II, also in which he played a number of songs.

Early in 2006, Williams announced his "Farewell Tour of the World" and played numerous dates both in the U.S. and abroad. The tour wrapped up with a sold-out Final Farewell Concert in Memphis, Tennessee, at the Cannon Center for Performing Arts on November 21, 2006. In 2010, Williams came out of retirement and was once again touring.

In March 2012, Williams announced the release of a new record, And So It Goes (UK release April 30, 2012; U.S./Worldwide release June 19, 2012), his first new record since 2004. The record was his first with the independent American label Sugar Hill Records. The record includes guest appearances by Alison Krauss, Keith Urban, and Vince Gill. To accompany the release, he embarked on a UK tour. A much-loved country artist among British fans, he had his final UK tour in 2014.

In March 2016, Williams announced he was retiring from touring and cancelled all his scheduled shows. "It's time to hang my hat up and enjoy some quiet time at home. I'm so thankful for my fans, my friends, and my family for their everlasting love and support," he said in a statement.

== Personal life and death ==
Williams married Joy Janene Bucher in April 1960. They had two children.

Williams was active in attendance, when not touring, and once served as an elder, in a local church of Christ in Ashland City, Tennessee.

On September 8, 2017, Williams died in Mobile, Alabama, of emphysema.

== Discography ==
=== Albums ===
- 1973: Don Williams Volume One
- 1974: Don Williams Volume Two
- 1974: Don Williams Vol. III
- 1975: You're My Best Friend
- 1976: Harmony
- 1977: Visions
- 1977: Country Boy
- 1978: Expressions
- 1979: Portrait
- 1980: I Believe in You
- 1981: Especially for You
- 1982: Listen to the Radio
- 1983: Yellow Moon
- 1984: Cafe Carolina
- 1986: New Moves
- 1987: Traces
- 1987: One Good Well
- 1990: True Love
- 1992: Currents
- 1995: Borrowed Tales
- 1996: Flatlands
- 1998: I Turn the Page
- 2004: My Heart to You
- 2012: And So It Goes
- 2014: Reflections
- 2026: Epilogue: The Cellar Tapes

== Awards and nominations ==
=== Academy of Country Music Awards ===
Year	Nominee / work	Award	Result
1979	Don Williams	Top Male Vocalist of the Year	Nominated
1979	"Tulsa Time"	Single Record of the Year	Won
1980	Don Williams	Top Male Vocalist of the Year	Nominated
1981	Don Williams	Top Male Vocalist of the Year	Nominated
1981	I Believe in You	Album of the Year	Nominated
1981	"I Believe in You"	Single Record of the Year	Nominated
1981	"I Believe in You"	Song of the Year	Nominated
1982	Don Williams and Emmylou Harris	Top Vocal Duo of the Year	Nominated
1983	Listen to the Radio	Album of the Year	Nominated
2007	Don Williams	Cliffie Stone Pioneer Award	Awarded

=== Country Music Association Awards ===
Year	Nominee / work	Award	Result
1976	Don Williams	Male Vocalist of the Year	Nominated
1977	Don Williams	Male Vocalist of the Year	Nominated
1978	Don Williams	Male Vocalist of the Year	Won
1978	Country Boy	Album of the Year	Nominated
1979	Don Williams	Male Vocalist of the Year	Nominated
1980	Don Williams	Male Vocalist of the Year	Nominated
1980	"Good Ole Boys Like Me"	Single of the Year	Nominated
1981	"I Believe in You"	Single of the Year	Nominated
1981	Don Williams	Male Vocalist of the Year	Nominated
1981	I Believe in You	Album of the Year	Won
1982	Don Williams and Emmylou Harris	Vocal Duo of the Year	Nominated
1983	Don Williams and Emmylou Harris	Vocal Duo of the Year	Nominated
14	Don Williams and Emmylou Harris	Vocal Duo of the Year	Nominated
