= Crystal Gayle singles discography =

- Singles: 69
- Music videos: 15
- Promotional singles: 6
- Collaborations: 5
- Featured singles: 4

American country music artist Crystal Gayle has released 15 music videos and 69 singles, including six as a collaborative artist, four as a featured artist, and five promos. Gayle's debut single was 1970's "I've Cried (The Blue Right Out of My Eyes)" via Decca Records, which reached number 23 on the Billboard Hot Country Singles chart. Encouraged by her sister to develop her own musical style, Gayle signed with United Artists Records where she began recording country pop material. That year "Wrong Road Again" reached number 6 on the country chart, launching several major hits including "I'll Do It All Over Again" and her first #1 hit, "I'll Get Over You". She released "Don't It Make My Brown Eyes Blue" in 1977 which became her signature song and brought her crossover pop success. It topped the country chart, reached number 2 on the Billboard Hot 100, and became an international hit. Its success elevated her career and was followed by three more number-one country singles: "Ready for the Times to Get Better", "Why Have You Left the One You Left Me For", and the top-twenty pop hit "Talking in Your Sleep".

Transitioning to Columbia Records in 1979, "Half the Way" became Gayle's third top-20 pop hit and reached number 2 on the Billboard country chart. She continued to regularly top the country chart, with crossovers into the Hot 100 during the 1980s. Examples include 1980's "It's Like We Never Said Goodbye" and "If You Ever Change Your Mind". "The Woman in Me" (1981) reached number 3 on the country chart and number 76 on the Hot 100. From 1982 to 1984, she had four number-one country hits, including the crossover successes "Baby, What About You" and "The Sound of Goodbye". Featured on Eddie Rabbitt's "You and I" (1982), she garnered a 10th chart-topping country single and second top-10 on the Hot 100. The number-one hit "Makin' Up for Lost Time" (1985) started a two-year collaboration with Gary Morris. In 1986, a cover of "Cry" and the original "Straight to the Heart" became her final number-one hits, as toward the end of the decade, her success declined due to shifts back to traditional Country. Her 1990 cover of "Never Ending Song of Love" became her last appearance on the Billboard Hot Country Singles chart. Gayle has continued issuing singles and has been featured on other artists' releases. In 2010, she was featured on Mishavonna's holiday single "Christmas Everywhere".

== Singles ==
=== As lead artist ===
List of singles, with selected chart positions and certifications, showing other relevant details
Title	Year	Peak chart positions									Certifications	Album
Title	Year	US	US Cou.	US AC	AUS	CAN	CAN Cou.	CAN AC	IRE	UK	Certifications	Album
"I've Cried (The Blue Right Out of My Eyes)"	1970	—	23	—	—	—	34	—	—	—		—N/a
"Everybody Oughta Cry"	1972	—	70	—	—	—	—	—	—	—		—N/a
"I Hope You're Havin' Better Luck Than Me"	1972	—	49	—	—	—	—	—	—	—		—N/a
"Show Me How"	1973	—	—	—	—	—	—	—	—	—		—N/a
"Restless"	1974	—	39	—	—	—	—	—	—	—		—N/a
"Wrong Road Again"	1974	—	6	—	—	—	17	—	—	—		Crystal Gayle
"Beyond You"	1975	—	27	—	—	—	47	—	—	—		Crystal Gayle
"This Is My Year for Mexico"	1975	—	21	—	—	—	23	—	—	—		Crystal Gayle
"Somebody Loves You"	1975	—	8	—	—	—	1	—	—	—		Somebody Loves You
"I'll Get Over You"	1976	71	1	40	82	—	2	—	—	—		Somebody Loves You
"One More Time (Karneval)"	1976	—	31	—	—	—	26	—	—	—		Crystal
"You Never Miss a Real Good Thing (Till He Says Goodbye)"	1976	—	1	—	—	—	1	—	—	—		Crystal
"I'll Do It All Over Again"	1977	—	2	—	—	—	3	—	—	—		Crystal
"Don't It Make My Brown Eyes Blue"	1977	2	1	4	16	1	1	1	4	5	BPI: Silver; MC: Gold; RIAA: Gold	We Must Believe in Magic
"Ready for the Times to Get Better"	1978	52	1	3	—	60	1	4	—	—		Crystal
"Talking in Your Sleep"	1978	18	1	3	70	11	1	3	5	11	BPI: Silver	When I Dream
"Why Have You Left the One You Left Me For"	1978	—	1	22	—	—	1	16	—	—		When I Dream
"When I Dream"	1979	84	3	20	—	—	3	—	—	—		When I Dream
"Your Kisses Will"	1979	—	7	35	—	—	14	5	—	—		We Should Be Together
"Half the Way"	1979	15	2	9	—	56	1	2	—	—		Miss the Mississippi
"Your Old Cold Shoulder"	1979	—	5	—	—	—	5	—	—	—		We Should Be Together
"It's Like We Never Said Goodbye"	1980	63	1	17	—	—	1	7	—	—		Miss the Mississippi
"The Blue Side"	1980	81	8	16	—	—	4	3	—	—		Miss the Mississippi
"If You Ever Change Your Mind"	1980	—	1	18	—	—	3	5	—	—		These Days
"Take It Easy"	1981	—	17	—	—	—	3	—	—	—		These Days
"Too Many Lovers"	1981	—	1	—	—	—	1	—	—	—		These Days
"The Woman in Me"	1981	76	3	17	—	—	2	6	—	—		Hollywood, Tennessee
"You Never Gave Up on Me"	1982	—	5	32	—	—	3	—	—	—		Hollywood, Tennessee
"Livin' in These Troubled Times"	1982	—	9	—	—	—	30	—	—	—		Hollywood, Tennessee
"'Til I Gain Control Again"	1982	—	1	—	—	—	12	—	—	—		True Love
"Everything I Own" (Note: Released only in the UK.)	1983	—	—	—	—	—	—	—	—	93		True Love
"Our Love Is on the Faultline"	1983	—	1	23	—	—	1	—	—	—		True Love
"Baby, What About You"	1983	83	1	9	—	—	1	9	—	—		True Love
"The Sound of Goodbye"	1983	84	1	10	—	—	9	—	—	—		Cage the Songbird
"I Don't Wanna Lose Your Love"	1984	—	2	15	—	—	1	—	—	—		Cage the Songbird
"Turning Away"	1984	—	1	—	—	—	1	—	—	—		Cage the Songbird
"Me Against the Night"	1984	—	4	—	—	—	1	—	—	—		Cage the Songbird
"Nobody Wants to Be Alone"	1985	—	3	—	—	—	4	—	—	—		Nobody Wants to Be Alone
"A Long and Lasting Love"	1985	—	5	—	—	—	5	—	—	—		Nobody Wants to Be Alone
"Cry"	1986	—	1	—	—	—	1	—	—	—		Straight to the Heart
"Straight to the Heart"	1986	—	1	—	—	—	2	—	—	—		Straight to the Heart
"Nobody Should Have to Love This Way"	1987	—	26	—	—	—	—	—	—	—		Straight to the Heart
"Only Love Can Save Me Now"	1987	—	11	—	—	—	18	—	—	—		The Best of Crystal Gayle
"Nobody's Angel"	1988	—	22	—	—	—	7	—	—	—		Nobody's Angel
"Tennessee Nights"	1988	—	44	—	—	—	55	—	—	—		Nobody's Angel
"Everybody's Reaching Out for Someone"	1990	—	— (Note: "Everybody's Reaching Out for Someone" did not chart on Hot Country Songs chart, but peaked at number 7 on Hot Country Radio Breakouts list.)	—	—	—	60	—	—	—		Ain't Gonna Worry
"Never Ending Song of Love"	1990	—	72	—	—	—	78	—	—	—		Ain't Gonna Worry
"Just an Old Love"	1990	—	—	—	—	—	—	—	—	—		Ain't Gonna Worry
"It Ain't Gonna Worry My Mind"	1991	—	—	—	—	—	84	—	—	—		Ain't Gonna Worry
"Three Good Reasons"	1992	—	—	—	—	—	—	—	—	—		Three Good Reasons
"Someday"	1995	—	—	—	—	—	—	—	—	—		Someday
"Two Sleepy People" (with Willie Nelson)	1999	—	—	—	—	—	—	—	—	—		Crystal Gayle Sings the Heart and Soul of Hoagy Carmichael
"Hallelujah I Love Him So"	2003	—	—	—	—	—	—	—	—	—		All My Tomorrows
"Ribbon of Darkness"	2019	—	—	—	—	—	—	—	—	—		You Don't Know Me: Classic Country
"—" denotes a recording that did not chart or was not released in that territory.

=== As a collaborative artist ===
List of singles, with selected chart positions, showing other relevant details
Title	Year	Peak chart positions			Album
Title	Year	US Cou.	US AC	CAN Cou.	Album
"Makin' Up for Lost Time (The Dallas Lovers' Song)" (with Gary Morris)	1985	1	36	1	Dallas: The Music Story
"Another World" (with Gary Morris)	1987	4	—	—	What If We Fall in Love?
"All of This and More" (with Gary Morris)	1988	26	—	—	What If We Fall in Love?
"I Made a Promise" (with Eddie Rabbitt)	1995	—	—	—	Gordy
"Christmas Everywhere" (with Mishavonna)	2010	—	—	—	—N/a
"Lonely Street Choir" (with Sulo)	2021	—	—	—	—N/a
"—" denotes a recording that did not chart or was not released in that territory.

=== As a featured artist ===
List of singles, with selected chart positions, showing other relevant details
Title	Year	Peak chart positions								Album
Title	Year	US	US Cou.	US AC	AUS	CAN	CAN Cou.	CAN AC	UK	Album
"You and I" (Eddie Rabbitt with Crystal Gayle)	1982	7	1	2	88	35	1	1	81	Radio Romance
"Walk with Me" (Charles Dumont with Crystal Gayle)	1992	—	—	—	—	—	—	—	—	Charles Dumont
"When I Dream" (Fizz featuring Crystal Gayle)	1998	—	—	—	—	—	—	—	—	—N/a
"Beautiful Life" (Sherry Lynn with Crystal Gayle)	2013	—	—	—	—	—	—	—	—	A Beautiful Life
"—" denotes a recording that did not chart or was not released in that territory.

== Other singles ==
List of other singles, with selected chart positions, showing other relevant details
Title	Year	Peak chart positions		Album	Notes
Title	Year	US Coun.	CAN Coun.	Album	Notes
"I've Cried (The Blue Right Out of My Eyes)"	1977	40	36	I've Cried the Blue Right Out of My Eyes	(Note: Re-released in 1977 when an album of the same name was released.)
"River Road"	1980	64	47	Favorites	(Note: Released as a promotional single in 1980.)
"Heart Mender"	1980	58	—	Favorites	(Note: Released as a promotional single in 1980.)
"Keepin' Power"	1983	49	—	Crystal Gayle's Greatest Hits	(Note: Released as a promotional single in 1983.)
"Have Yourself a Merry Little Christmas"	1986	—	—	A Crystal Christmas	(Note: Issued as a single specifically for the holiday season.)
"O Holy Night"	1987	—	—	A Crystal Christmas	(Note: Issued as a single specifically for the holiday season.)
"Christmas in America"	2000	—	—	A Crystal Christmas	(Note: Issued as a single specifically for the holiday season. The song appeared on the re-issued version of Gayle's original 1986 holiday album.)
"—" denotes a recording that did not chart or was not released in that territory.

== Music videos ==
List of music videos, showing year released and director
Title	Year	Director(s)
"Don't It Make My Brown Eyes Blue"	1977	
"Half the Way"	1979	—N/a
"If You Ever Change Your Mind"	1980	—N/a
"Too Many Lovers"	1981	—N/a
"'Til I Gain Control Again"	1982	Marc Ball
"I Don't Wanna Lose Your Love"	1984	—N/a
"Nobody Wants to Be Alone"	1985	Marc Ball
"A Long and Lasting Love"	1985	Marc Ball
"Touch and Go"	1985	—N/a
"Have Yourself a Merry Little Christmas"	1986	Jon Small
"Another World" (with Gary Morris)	1987	Jack Cole
"Nobody's Angel"	1988	Peter MacKay
"Three Good Reasons"	1992	Thom Oliphant
"I Made a Promise" (with Eddie Rabbitt)	1995	—N/a
"Someday"	1995	Tom Bevins
"Hallelujah I Love Him So"	2003	—N/a
"Lonely Street Choir" (with Sulo)	2021	—N/a
