= Crystal Gayle albums discography =

- Studio albums: 25
- Soundtrack albums: 1
- Live albums: 1
- Compilation albums: 17
- Video albums: 2
- Other appearances: 16

American country artist Crystal Gayle has released 25 studio albums, 17 compilation albums, two video albums, one live album, one soundtrack album, and has appeared on 16 additional albums. Gayle signed with United Artists Records in 1974 and began recording albums. Her self-titled debut album was issued in 1975, peaking at number 25 on the Billboard Top Country Albums chart. After releasing two similar studio albums, Gayle issued We Must Believe in Magic in 1977. Reaching number two on the country albums chart and number 12 on the Billboard 200, it became the first album by a female country artist to be certified platinum by the Recording Industry Association of America. When I Dream (1978) also peaked in the second position of the Top Country Albums survey and was certified platinum in the US. Her seventh studio album, Miss the Mississippi (1979), was issued on Columbia Records and certified gold in the United States. These Days achieved similar status in 1980. Her ninth studio album entitled Hollywood, Tennessee (1981) contained several cover versions of pop music songs. In 1983, Gayle issued her first greatest hits compilation, Crystal Gayle's Greatest Hits before leaving Columbia. The album was certified gold from the RIAA a decade later.

Gayle recorded the soundtrack for One from the Heart with Tom Waits before signing with Elektra Records. Her tenth studio album, True Love (1982), peaked at number 14 on the Top Country Albums chart and number 120 on the Billboard 200. Cage the Songbird (1983) reached the fifth position on the country albums survey and became her final release to appear on the Billboard 200. Following the release of her twelfth studio album in 1985, Gayle collaborated with Gary Morris to record What If We Fall in Love? (1986). This was followed by a Christmas album and her final studio album of the decade in 1988, Nobody's Angel. Although her popularity declined, Gayle continued recording, releasing the studio albums Ain't Gonna Worry (1990) and Three Good Reasons. During the mid-1990s, Gayle began venturing into different styles of music. She issued an album of Gospel music entitled Someday in 1995 and an album of Children's music in 2000, In My Arms. She also recorded two albums of American standard songs during this time. Gayle's most recent was 2003's All My Tomorrows.

== Studio albums ==
List of albums, with selected chart positions and certifications, showing other relevant details
| Title | Album details | Peak chart positions | | | | | | Certifications |
| Title | Album details | US | US Cou. | AUS | CAN | CAN Cou. | UK | Certifications |
|---|---|---|---|---|---|---|---|---|
| Crystal Gayle | Released: February 7, 1975; Label: United Artists; Formats: Vinyl, cassette | — | 25 | — | — | 12 | — | |
| Somebody Loves You | Released: October 20, 1975; Label: United Artists; Formats: Vinyl, cassette | — | 11 | — | — | — | — | |
| Crystal | Released: August 6, 1976; Label: United Artists; Formats: Vinyl, cassette | — | 7 | — | — | — | — | |
| We Must Believe in Magic | Released: June 24, 1977; Label: United Artists; Formats: Vinyl, cassette | 12 | 2 | 47 | 5 | — | 15 | BPI: Silver; MC: Gold; RIAA: Platinum |
| When I Dream | Released: June 2, 1978; Label: United Artists; Formats: Vinyl, cassette | 52 | 2 | — | 50 | 1 | 25 | BPI: Silver; MC: Gold; RIAA: Platinum |
| We Should Be Together | Released: June 19, 1979; Label: United Artists; Formats: Vinyl, cassette | 128 | 9 | — | — | 7 | — | |
| Miss the Mississippi | Released: September 1979; Label: Columbia; Formats: Vinyl, cassette | 36 | 3 | — | — | 6 | — | RIAA: Gold |
| These Days | Released: August 1980; Label: Columbia; Formats: Vinyl, cassette | 79 | 6 | — | — | — | — | RIAA: Gold |
| Hollywood, Tennessee | Released: August 1981; Label: Columbia; Formats: Vinyl, cassette | 99 | 5 | — | — | — | — | |
| True Love | Released: November 1982; Label: Elektra; Formats: Vinyl, cassette | 120 | 14 | — | — | — | — | |
| Cage the Songbird | Released: October 17, 1983; Label: Warner Bros.; Formats: Vinyl, cassette | 171 | 5 | — | — | — | — | |
| Nobody Wants to Be Alone | Released: April 1985; Label: Warner Bros.; Formats: Vinyl, cassette | — | 17 | — | — | — | — | |
| Straight to the Heart | Released: August 1986; Label: Warner Bros.; Formats: Vinyl, cassette | — | 12 | — | — | — | — | |
| A Crystal Christmas | Released: October 1986; Label: Warner Bros.; Formats: Vinyl, cassette | — | 69 | — | — | — | — | |
| What If We Fall in Love? (with Gary Morris) | Released: November 1986; Label: Warner Bros.; Formats: Vinyl, cassette, CD | — | 25 | — | — | — | — | |
| Nobody's Angel | Released: September 1988; Label: Warner Bros.; Formats: Vinyl, cassette, CD | — | 63 | — | — | — | — | |
| Ain't Gonna Worry | Released: July 2, 1990; Label: Capitol; Formats: Cassette, CD | — | — | — | — | — | — | |
| Three Good Reasons | Released: June 2, 1992; Label: Liberty; Formats: Cassette, CD | — | — | — | — | — | — | |
| Best Always (re-recordings) | Released: July 1993; Label: Branson/Intersound; Formats: Cassette, CD | — | — | — | — | — | — | |
| Someday | Released: May 30, 1995; Label: Intersound; Formats: Cassette, CD | — | — | — | — | — | — | |
| Joy & Inspiration | Released: 1997; Label: Beautiful/Warner; Formats: Cassette, CD | — | — | — | — | — | — | |
| Crystal Gayle Sings the Heart and Soul of Hoagy Carmichael | Released: November 2, 1999; Label: Intersound; Formats: Cassette, CD | — | — | — | — | — | — | |
| In My Arms | Released: October 31, 2000; Label: Madacy; Formats: Cassette, CD | — | — | — | — | — | — | |
| All My Tomorrows | Released: September 30, 2003; Label: Southpaw; Formats: CD | — | — | — | — | — | — | |
| You Don't Know Me: Classic Country | Released: September 6, 2019; Label: Southpaw; Formats: CD, digital download | — | — (Note: Although You Don't Know Me did not peak on the Billboard Top Country Albums chart, it did reach number 27 on the Billboard Top Country Albums sales list. It also peaked at number 40 on the Billboard Top Independent Albums chart.) | — | — | — | — | |
"—" denotes a recording that did not chart or was not released in that territory.

== Compilation albums ==
List of albums, with selected chart positions and certifications, showing other relevant details
| Title | Album details | Peak chart positions | | | Certifications |
| Title | Album details | US | US Cou. | UK | Certifications |
|---|---|---|---|---|---|
| I've Cried the Blue Right Out of My Eyes | Released: February 1978; Label: MCA Records; Formats: Vinyl, cassette | — | 19 | — | |
| Classic Crystal | Released: October 1979; Label: Liberty; Formats: Vinyl, cassette | 62 | 8 | — | MC: Gold; RIAA: Gold |
| The Crystal Gayle Singles Album | Released: 1980; Label: EMI; Formats: Vinyl, cassette | — | — | 7 | BPI: Silver |
| Favorites | Released: April 1980; Label: Liberty; Formats: Vinyl, cassette | 149 | 37 | — | |
| A Woman's Heart | Released: November 1980; Label: Liberty; Formats: Vinyl, cassette | — | 40 | — | |
| Crystal Gayle's Greatest Hits | Released: August 1983; Label: Columbia; Formats: Vinyl, cassette | 169 | 23 | — | RIAA: Gold |
| The Best of Crystal Gayle | Released: August 1987; Label: Warner Bros.; Formats: Vinyl, cassette | — | 53 | — | |
| All-Time Greatest Hits | Released: August 27, 1990; Label: Curb; Formats: Cassette, CD | — | — | — | |
| The Best of Crystal Gayle | Released: October 5, 1993; Label: Curb; Formats: Cassette, CD | — | — | — | |
| 50 Original Tracks | Released: 1993; Label: EMI; Formats: CD | — | — | — | |
| Super Hits | Released: February 17, 1998; Label: Columbia/Sony; Formats: Cassette, CD | — | — | — | |
| Certified Hits | Released: August 28, 2001; Label: Capitol; Formats: CD | — | — | — | |
| The Best of Crystal Gayle | Released: March 19, 2002; Label: Rhino; Formats: CD | — | — | — | |
| 20 Love Songs | Released: December 3, 2002; Label: EMI; Formats: CD | — | — | — | |
| The Hits | Released: August 28, 2007; Label: Capitol Nashville; Formats: CD, music download | — | 65 | — | |
| 10 Great Songs | Released: June 3, 2012; Label: Capitol Nashville; Formats: CD | — | — | — | |
| Icon: Crystal Gayle | Released: August 30, 2013; Label: Capitol Nashville; Formats: CD | — | — | — | |
"—" denotes a recording that did not chart or was not released in that territory.

== Other major releases ==
=== Other albums ===
List of albums, showing all relevant details
| Title | Album details |
|---|---|
| One from the Heart (with Tom Waits) | Released: February 1982; Label: Columbia; Formats: Vinyl, cassette |
| Live! An Evening with Crystal Gayle | Released: August 29, 2006; Label: Cleopatra; Formats: CD, music download |

=== Video albums ===
List of albums, showing all relevant details
| Title | Album details |
|---|---|
| Crystal Gayle's Holiday in Finland | Released: December 11, 2001; Label: White Star; Formats: VHS |
| Crystal Gayle in Concert | DVD release date: January 25, 2005; Label: White Star; Formats: DVD |

== Other appearances ==
List of non-single guest appearances, with other performing artists, showing year released and album name
| Title | Year | Other artist(s) | Album |
|---|---|---|---|
| "Faded Love" | 1980 | Willie Nelson; Ray Price | San Antonio Rose |
| "Here Comes the Rainbow" | 1982 | none | In Harmony 2 |
| "Just Beyond the Pain" | 1992 | Charlie Louvin | 50 Years of Makin' Music |
| "Barbara Allen" | 1993 | Harold Carr, Kansas Settlers Band, John McEuen | The Wild West: Music From the Epic Television Mini-Series |
| "It Had to Be You" | 1994 | Peter Nero | It Had to Be You |
| "Special Kind of Christmas" | 1995 | Jay Patten | Impressions of Christmas |
| "Falling in Love for the Night" | 1997 | Charlie Daniels | Volunteer Jam VII |
| "Hallelujah", "What Child Is This?" | 1997 | none | Country Christmas: Stars of Nashville |
| "Secret of Your Heart" | 1999 | Benny Martin | Big Tiger Roars Again, Pt. 1 |
| "I Can't Forget You" | 1999 | Patsy Cline | Patsy Cline Duets, Volume 1 |
| "We Could, You and I" | 1999 | Don Walser | Here's to Country Music |
| "In a Mansion Stands My Love" | 2000 | Johnny Russell | Actin' Naturally |
| "Slim Chance" | 2001 | Benny Martin | The Big Tiger Roars Again, Pt. 2 |
| "More and More" | 2002 | none | Caught in the Webb: A Tribute to the Legendary Webb Pierce |
| "It's Really Surprising" | 2002 | none | 36 Greatest Gospel Memories: A Loving Tribute to Albert E. Brumley |
| "Did You Know" | 2005 | none | Songs from the Neighborhood: The Music of Mister Rogers |
