= Crystal Gayle's Greatest Hits =

Greatest hits album by Crystal Gayle
- Released: August 15, 1983
- Studio: Jack's Tracks (Nashville, TN)
- Genre: Country
- Length: 33:41
- Label: Columbia
- Producer: Allen Reynolds

Crystal Gayle chronology
A Woman's Heart (1981)	Crystal Gayle's Greatest Hits (1983)	The Best of Crystal Gayle (1987)

Professional ratings
Review scores
Source	Rating
AllMusic	4/5 stars

Crystal Gayle's Greatest Hits is the fifth compilation album by American country singer Crystal Gayle. It was released on August 15, 1983, via Columbia Records, marking her first greatest hits album for the label. Recorded at Jack's Tracks Recording Studio and produced by Allen Reynolds, the compilation is composed of selected singles from the three studio albums she had released on Columbia.

Domestically, the album peaked at number 169 on the Billboard 200 and number 23 on the Top Country Albums charts. On December 27, 1994, it was certified gold by the Recording Industry Association of America for the sales of 500,000 copies in the United States alone.

== Track listing ==
No.	Title	Writer(s)	Length
1.	"Half the Way"	Bobby Wood; Ralph Murphy	4:03
2.	"If You Ever Change Your Mind"	Parker McGee; Bob Gundry	3:13
3.	"It's Like We Never Said Goodbye"	Roger Greenaway; Geoff Stephens	3:30
4.	"You Never Gave Up on Me"	Leslie Pearl	3:08
5.	"Livin' in These Troubled Times"	Roger Cook; Philip Donnelly; Sam Hogin	3:13
6.	"Keepin' Power"	Cook; Wood	3:04
7.	"The Woman in Me"	Susan Marie Thomas	2:28
8.	"Too Many Lovers"	Mark True; Ted Lindsay; Hogin	3:45
9.	"Take It Easy"	Delbert McClinton	3:58
10.	"The Blue Side"	David Lasley; Allee Willis	3:15

Notes

- Tracks 1, 3 and 10 are taken from Miss the Mississippi.
- Tracks 2, 8 and 9 are taken from These Days.
- Tracks 4 to 7 are taken from Hollywood, Tennessee.

== Charts ==
Chart (1983)	Peak position
US Billboard 200	169
US Top Country Albums (Billboard)	23

== Certifications ==
Region	Certification	Certified units/sales
United States (RIAA)	Gold	500,000^{^}
^{^} Shipments figures based on certification alone.
