= Counting Sheep (disambiguation) =

Counting sheep is a way to fall asleep

Counting Sheep may also refer to:

- Counting Sheep (film), a 2022 Spanish-Argentine black comedy film
- Counting Sheep (album), a 2000 album by Collin Raye
- "Counting Sheep" (song), a song by Safia
- "Counting Sheep", a song by Lower Than Atlantis from Changing Tune
- "Counting Sheep", a song by Atlantis, 1991
- "Counting Sheep", a song by Dune Rats from The Kids Will Know It's Bullshit, 2017
- "Counting Sheep", a song by The JudyBats from Native Son, 1991
- "Counting Sheep", a song by Glass Cloud from The Royal Thousand
- Counting Sheep, an album by The Lemon Bucket Orkestra

== See also ==
- "Counting Sheep Around the World", a song by Crystal Gayle from In My Arms, 2000
