= In My Arms =

In My Arms can refer to:

Songs

- "In My Arms" (Dick Haymes song)
- "In My Arms" (Erasure song)
- "In My Arms" (Mylo song)
- "In My Arms" (Plumb song)
- "In My Arms" (Kylie Minogue song)
- In My Arms, a song by Teddy Thompson from A Piece of What You Need, also performed by Glen Campbell
- "In My Arms", a song by Snow Patrol from their 2006 album Eyes Open

Albums

- In My Arms (album), a 2000 album by Crystal Gayle
