= Best Always =

Studio album by Crystal Gayle
- Released: July 1993
- Studio: The Music Mill, Sound Emporium, Soundshop Studios, Reflections Studio and Emerald Sound Studios (Nashville, Tennessee).
- Genre: Country
- Length: 33:25
- Label: Branson Entertainment
- Producer: John Donegan; Crystal Gayle; Jay Patten

Crystal Gayle chronology
Three Good Reasons (1992)	Best Always (1993)	Someday (1995)

Best Always is the nineteenth studio album released by American country artist Crystal Gayle. The album was released in 1993 on Branson Entertainment and was co-produced by Gayle as well. The album was her first to be released on an independent label and contained a mix of re-recordings of some of Gayle's songs and cover versions of songs originally recorded by others.

== Background ==
During the early 1990s, Crystal Gayle had been recording for the major labels Capitol and Liberty Records. After 1992, she departed from these labels and began recording for smaller labels. The first independent label she recorded under was Branson Entertainment, which Best Always was released through. The album contained cover versions of songs Gayle had previously recorded. Examples of this included Gayle's former hits from 1970s and 80s, "When I Dream" and "Ready for the Times to Get Better". Best Always also featured cover versions of songs Gayle had not yet recorded. Among these were "Crazy" by Patsy Cline and Irving Berlin's "Always".

== Critical reception and release ==
The album received 2 out of 5 stars from Allmusic.

Best Always was officially released in July 1993 via Branson Entertainment. The album was released in both cassette and compact disc versions. In later editions, the album was released via Southpaw Music Productions.

== Track listing ==
Best Always
No.	Title	Writer(s)	Original Artist	Length
1.	"Ready for the Times to Get Better"	Allen Reynolds	Crystal Gayle	3:24
2.	"Crazy"	Willie Nelson	Patsy Cline	2:47
3.	"For the Good Times"	Kris Kristofferson	Ray Price	3:21
4.	"Silver Threads and Golden Needles"	Jack Rhodes; Dick Reynolds	Wanda Jackson	2:14
5.	"When I Dream"	Sandy Mason	Crystal Gayle	3:40
6.	"Talking in Your Sleep"	Roger Cook; Bobby Wood	Crystal Gayle	2:55
7.	"Oh, Lonesome Me"	Don Gibson	Don Gibson	2:53
8.	"I Fall to Pieces"	Hank Cochran; Harlan Howard	Patsy Cline	2:58
9.	"Beyond You"	Bill Gatzimos; Crystal Gayle	Crystal Gayle	2:16
10.	"Don't It Make My Brown Eyes Blue"	Richard Leigh	Crystal Gayle	2:44
11.	"Break My Mind"	John D. Loudermilk	George Hamilton IV	2:11
12.	"Always"	Irving Berlin	Henry Burr	2:37
Total length:				33:25

== Personnel ==
All credits are adapted from Allmusic.

Musicians

- Crystal Gayle – lead vocals, backing vocals
- Charles Cochran – acoustic piano, keyboards
- Dean Slocum – acoustic piano, keyboards
- Chris Leuzinger – acoustic guitar, electric guitars
- Mike Loudermilk – acoustic guitar, electric guitars
- Jay Patten – acoustic guitar, mandolin, saxophones
- Duncan Mullins – bass
- Tony Newman – drums
- Kenny Malone – percussion
- Buddy Spicher – fiddle, viola
- Jim Ferguson – backing vocals

Creative

- Ron Keith – photography
- Kent Wells – graphic design

Technical

- John Donegan – producer
- Crystal Gayle – producer
- Jay Patten – producer
- Joe Scalfe – engineer
- David Sinko – engineer
- John "JD" Dickson – additional engineer
- Ronny Light – additional engineer
- Steve Tillisch – mixing
- Paula Montondo – mix assistant
- Glenn Meadows – mastering at Masterfonics (Nashville, Tennessee)
