= The Woman in Me =

The Woman in Me may refer to:

- The Woman in Me (album), a 1995 album by Shania Twain
- The Woman in Me (memoir), a memoir by American singer Britney Spears
- "The Woman in Me" (Crystal Gayle song), 1981
- "The Woman in Me" (Donna Summer song), 1982, covered by Heart in 1994
- "The Woman in Me (Needs the Man in You)", a song from Shania Twain

== See also ==
- Woman in Me, a 1997 album by Louise, or its title track
- "Woman in Me", a song by Jessica Simpson from Sweet Kisses (1999)
