= Classic Crystal =

Compilation album by Crystal Gayle
- Released: October 1979
- Genre: Country
- Label: Liberty
- Producer: Allen Reynolds

Crystal Gayle chronology
| We Should Be Together (1979) | Classic Crystal (1979) | Miss the Mississippi (1979) |

Classic Crystal is the second compilation album by American country music singer Crystal Gayle.

Released in October 1979, the album spans Gayle's time on the United Artists Records label, which proved to be the height of her career. It peaked at #8 on the Billboard Country Music Albums chart, and #62 on the Billboard 200. It was certified Gold by the RIAA in 1980.

In the United Kingdom, a 14 track modified version of the album was released in 1980 as The Crystal Gayle Singles Album. It included the recent UK singles 'We Should Be Together' and 'Too Deep For Tears' as well as 'High Time', 'River Road' and 'All I Wanna Do In Life'. 'I'll Do It All Over Again' was omitted. It reached #7 on the UK Album Chart (Gayle's first and only UK Top 10 album) and was certified Gold by the British Phonographic Industry.

== Track listing ==
| No. | Title | Writer(s) | Length |
|---|---|---|---|
| 1. | "Somebody Loves You" | Allen Reynolds | 2:24 |
| 2. | "Don't It Make My Brown Eyes Blue" | Richard Leigh | 2:37 |
| 3. | "Ready for the Times to Get Better" | Reynolds | 2:11 |
| 4. | "You Never Miss a Real Good Thing (Till He Says Goodbye)" | Bob McDill | 3:47 |
| 5. | "When I Dream" | Sandy Mason Theoret | 3:23 |
| 6. | "I'll Do It All Over Again" | McDill, Wayland Holyfield | 2:52 |
| 7. | "I'll Get Over You" | Leigh | 3:30 |
| 8. | "Wrong Road Again" | Leigh | 2:14 |
| 9. | "Talking In Your Sleep" | Roger Cook, Bobby Wood | 2:52 |
| 10. | "Why Have You Left the One You Left Me For" | Mark True | 2:54 |
