= A Woman's Heart (Crystal Gayle album) =

Compilation album by Crystal Gayle
- Released: November 1981
- Recorded: 1974–1977
- Genre: Country; country pop
- Label: Liberty Records
- Producer: Allen Reynolds

Crystal Gayle chronology
Hollywood, Tennessee (1981)	A Woman's Heart (1981)	True Love (1982)

A Woman's Heart is the fourth compilation album and the second of lesser known songs by American country music artist Crystal Gayle. It was released in November 1980 via Liberty Records and was produced by Allen Reynolds. The album consisted of songs originally included on Gayle's studio albums during her recording period with United Artists Records (later re-titled Liberty Records). It was one of several compilation albums released by the label that contained Gayle's material.

== Background and reception ==
A Woman's Heart contained ten tracks of previously recorded material. Of the ten songs, only two were previously released as singles ("This Is My Year for Mexico" and "One More Time") while the remaining songs had been included on Gayle's studio albums. "Hands" and the title track were originally recorded on Gayle's self-titled studio album (1975). "Let's Do It Right" was first included on Gayle's third studio album, Crystal (1976). "Make a Dream Come True" was the seventh track on her fourth studio album, We Must Believe in Magic (1977).

A Woman's Heart was originally released in November 1980 via Liberty Records. The album was issued as both a vinyl LP and an audio cassette. A Woman's Heart peaked in the fortieth position on the Billboard Top Country Albums chart in 1981. It did not spawn any singles or any other major releases.

== Track listing ==
Standard edition
No.	Title	Writer(s)	Length
1.	"Hello I Love You"	Charles Cochran, Roger Cook	2:31
2.	"A Woman's Heart (Is a Handy Place to Be)"	Cort Casady, Mike Chapman	2:32
3.	"Loving You So Long Now"	Allen Reynolds	2:56
4.	"Hands"	Bill Backer, Sandy Mason Theoret	2:58
5.	"One More Time (Karneval)"	Bryan Blackburn, Christian Heilburg, Joachim Heider	3:55
6.	"This Is My Year for Mexico"	Vince Matthews	2:45
7.	"Sweet Baby on My Mind"	Jim Owen	2:34
8.	"Before I'm Fool Enough"	Reynolds	2:06
9.	"Let's Do It Right"	Richard Leigh, Richard Mainegra	2:04
10.	"Make a Dream Come True"	Larry Kingston	3:06

== Charts ==
Weekly charts

Chart (1981)	Peak position
US Top Country Albums (Billboard)	40
