= List of awards and nominations received by Crystal Gayle =

Crystal Gayle awards and nominations
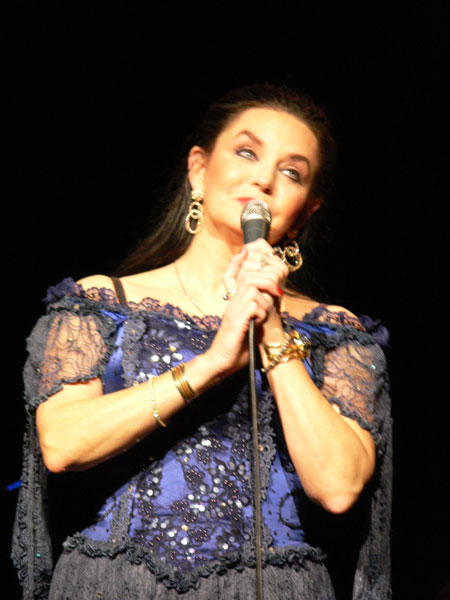
- Gayle performing in 2007
Awards and nominations
Award	Wins	Nominations

Totals (Note: Certain award groups do not simply award one winner. They acknowledge several different recipients, have runners-up, and have third place. Since this is a specific recognition and is different from losing an award, runner-up mentions are considered wins in this award tally. For simplification and to avoid errors, each award in this list has been presumed to have had a prior nomination.)
- Wins: 20+

American country artist Crystal Gayle has received more than 20 award wins and honors.

== Awards and honors ==
Academy of Country Music Awards

- Top New Female Vocalist (1975)
- Top Female Vocalist (1976)
- Top Female Vocalist (1977)
- Top Female Vocalist (1979)
- Cliffie Stone Pioneer Award (2016)

American Eagle Awards (NAMM)

- Lifetime Achievement Award (2017)

American Entertainment Magazine

- Best Female Entertainer (2007)

American Music Awards

- Favorite Female Country Artist (1979)
- Favorite Female Country Artist (1980)
- Favorite Female Country Artist (1986)
- Favorite Female Video Artist (1986)

Cherokee Medal Of Honor

- Awarded In Tahlequah, Oklahoma (2000)

Country Music Association Awards

- Female Vocalist Of The Year (1977)
- Female Vocalist Of The Year (1978)

Crystal Gayle Day

- October 2, 2009 - Hollywood, California

Grammy Awards

- Best Female Country Vocal Performance (1978) – "Don't It Make My Brown Eyes Blue"

Grand Ole Opry

- Member of the Grand Ole Opry - Inducted (2017)

Hollywood Walk Of Fame

- Star # 2390 Awarded (2007) – Unveiled (2009)

Indiana Historical Society

- Indiana Living Legend Award (2005)

Kentucky Music Hall Of Fame

- Inducted (2008)

Music City News

- Most Promising Female Artist Of The Year (1975)

Native American Music Association Hall Of Fame

- Inducted (2001)

People Magazine

- The 50 Most Beautiful People In The World (1983)
