= Favorites (Crystal Gayle album) =

Compilation album by Crystal Gayle
- Released: April 1980
- Recorded: Jack's Tracks (Nashville, Tennessee)
- Genre: Country
- Label: Liberty/United Records
- Producer: Allen Reynolds

Crystal Gayle chronology
These Days (1980)	Favorites (1980)	Hollywood, Tennessee (1981)

Favorites is the third compilation album by American country music artist Crystal Gayle. The album consists of some of Gayle's lesser-known songs from the period she was signed to United Artists Records. It was released in April 1980, only a short time after a greatest hits compilation album, Classic Crystal.

It was originally released on the United Artists Recordslabel with catalog number L00-1034 for the vinyl release and catalog number 4LOO 1034 for the audio cassette release. It was reissued under the Liberty Records label in 1984 with catalogue number LN-10229 and later reissued on CD under the EMI America label with catalogue number CDP 7 46582 2.

The album peaked at #37 on the Billboard Country Albums chart, and at #149 on the main Billboard 200 chart.

== Track listing ==
No.	Title	Writer(s)	Length
1.	"Don't Treat Me Like a Stranger"	Dave Loggins	3:12
2.	"I Wanna Come Back to You"	Johnny Christopher, Sam Hogin	2:54
3.	"Right in the Palm of Your Hand"	Bob McDill	3:03
4.	"You"	Dolly Parton	2:23
5.	"Wayward Wind"	Herbert Newman, Stan Lebowsky	2:53
6.	"River Road"	Sylvia Tyson	3:08
7.	"Heart Mender"	Richard Leigh, Milton Blackford	2:54
8.	"All I Wanna Do in Life"	Allen Reynolds	2:26
9.	"Come Home Daddy"	Terrye Newkirk	2:44
10.	"What I've Been Needin'"	Ray Griff	2:40

== Chart performance ==
Chart (1980)	Peak position
U.S. Billboard Top Country Albums	37
U.S. Billboard 200	149
