= In My Arms (Dick Haymes song) =

"In My Arms" is a popular song, recorded by Dick Haymes in 1943.

The recording was released by Decca Records as catalog number 18557. The B-side was "You Can't Be Wrong". The record first reached the Billboard magazine charts on July 22, 1943, and stayed 7 weeks on the chart, peaking at #7.

It was covered by Jeff Buckley.
