= Nobody's Angel (song) =

Single by Crystal Gayle

from the album Nobody's Angel
- B-side: "When Love Is New"
- Released: August 27, 1988
- Genre: Country
- Length: 3:06
- Label: Warner Bros. Nashville
- Songwriters: Karen Brooks, Randy Sharp
- Producers: Jim Ed Norman, Eric Prestlidge

Crystal Gayle singles chronology
"All of This and More" (1988)	"Nobody's Angel" (1988)	"Tennessee Nights" (1989)

"Nobody's Angel" is a song recorded by American country music artist Crystal Gayle. It was released in August 1988 as the first single and title track from the album Nobody's Angel. The song reached #22 on the Billboard Hot Country Singles & Tracks chart. The song was written by Karen Brooks and Randy Sharp. To date, it is Gayle's last single to achieve moderate chart success.

== Chart performance ==
Chart (1988)	Peak position
US Hot Country Songs (Billboard)	22
Canadian RPM Country Tracks	7
