= I've Cried the Blue Right Out of My Eyes =

Compilation album by Crystal Gayle
- Released: February 1978
- Genre: Country
- Label: MCA
- Producer: Owen Bradley

Crystal Gayle chronology
| We Must Believe in Magic (1977) | I've Cried the Blue Right Out of My Eyes (1978) | When I Dream (1978) |

Professional ratings
Review scores
| Source | Rating |
|---|---|
| Allmusic | 3/5 stars |

I've Cried the Blue Right Out of My Eyes is the first compilation album by the American country music singer Crystal Gayle. Released in February 1978, the album consists of her earliest recordings from Gayle's tenure on the Decca Records label from the early 1970s (Decca was assimilated into MCA Records during Gayle's contract). The album was produced by Owen Bradley, who had previously produced such country stars as Patsy Cline and Gayle's elder sister, Loretta Lynn (who wrote three of the songs featured on this compilation).

Four of the album's ten tracks were originally released as singles between 1970 and 1973, including Gayle's earliest hit, "I've Cried (The Blue Right Out of My Eyes)", which reached #23 on the Billboard Country Singles chart in August 1970 (the song was re-released in early 1978 to promote this album, this time reaching #40 on the Country Singles chart). "Everybody Oughta Cry" reached #70 in January 1972, and "I Hope You're Havin' Better Luck Than Me" peaked at #49 in May 1972. "Show Me How" was released as a single in 1973, but failed to chart.

Gayle was to have a short career with MCA, leaving for United Artists Records before an album had been released (although the aforementioned singles were). MCA released the album at the height of Gayle's popularity, sandwiched between two of her most successful UA albums, We Must Believe in Magic and When I Dream.

== Track listing ==
| No. | Title | Writer(s) | Length |
|---|---|---|---|
| 1. | "I've Cried (The Blue Right Out of My Eyes)" | Loretta Lynn | 2:42 |
| 2. | "Sparklin' Look of Love" | Lynn | 2:00 |
| 3. | "Too Far" | Marty Robbins | 2:57 |
| 4. | "Everybody Oughta Cry" | Theresa Beaty, Sylvia Richey | 2:19 |
| 5. | "Mama It's Different This Time" | Lynn | 2:20 |
| 6. | "Touching Me Again" | Joe Allen | 2:14 |
| 7. | "Clock on the Wall" | Donald Ray Webb | 2:27 |
| 8. | "Show Me How" | Carol Jones | 2:36 |
| 9. | "M.R.S. Degree" | Ann J. Morton, Lavon Lile | 2:11 |
| 10. | "I Hope You're Havin' Better Luck Than Me" | Ted Harris | 2:18 |
