= Counting sheep =

Mental exercise to fall asleep

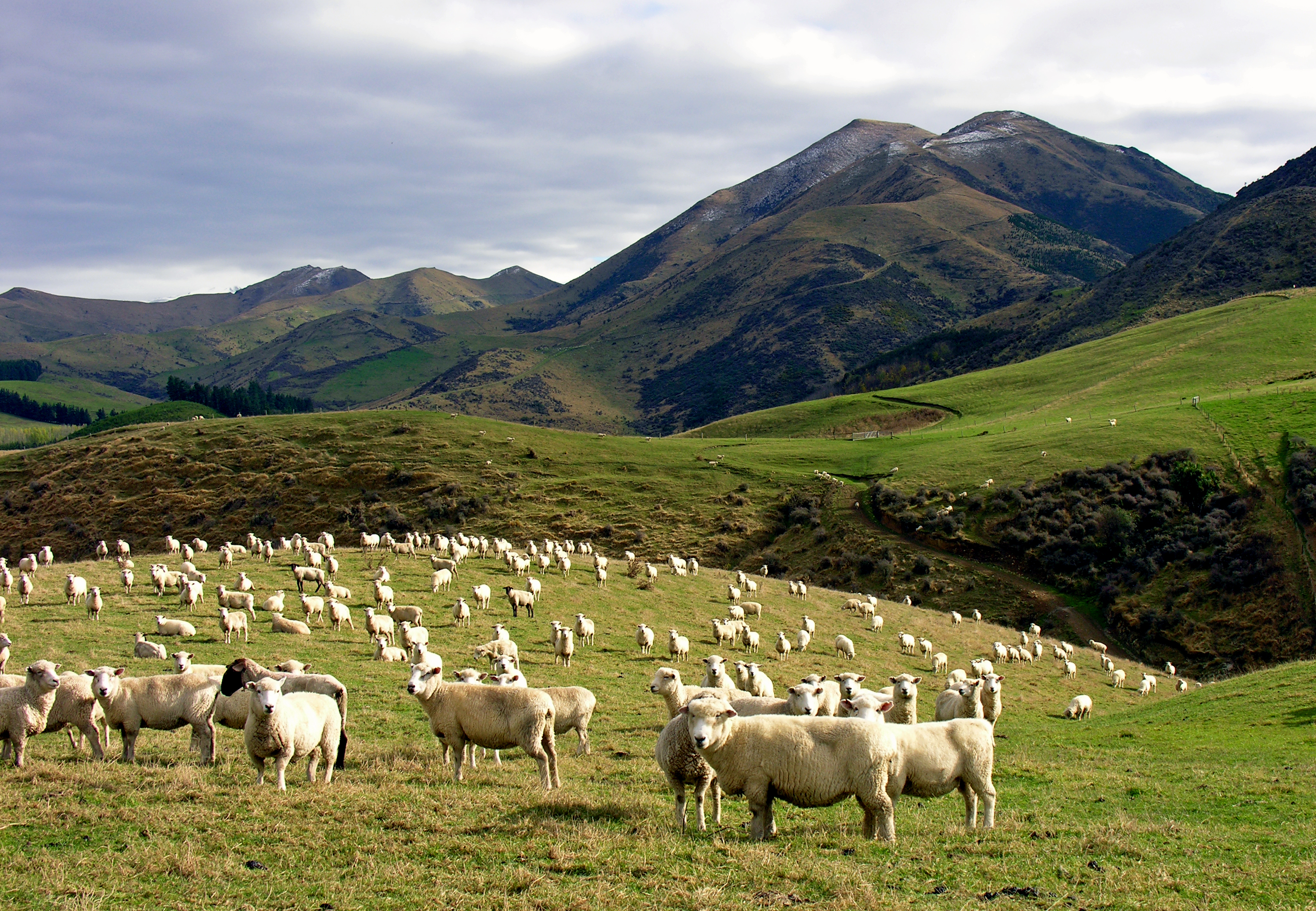
Sheep on a paddock

Counting sheep is a brain training exercise used in some Western cultures as a means of putting oneself to sleep.

In most depictions of the activity, the practitioner envisions an endless series of identical white sheep jumping over a fence, while counting them as they do so. The idea, presumably, is to induce boredom while occupying the mind with something simple, repetitive, and rhythmic, all of which are known to help humans sleep.

Although the practice is largely a stereotype, and rarely used as a solution for insomnia, it has been so commonly referenced by cartoons, comic strips, and other mass media, that it has become deeply engrained into popular culture's notion of sleep. Sheep themselves have become associated with sleep, or lack thereof.

== Effectiveness ==
The effectiveness of the method may depend upon the mental power required. An experiment conducted by researchers at Oxford University, though not involving livestock as the object of visualization, found that subjects who imagined "a beach or a waterfall" were forced to expend more mental energy, and fell asleep faster, than those asked to "simply distract from thoughts, worries and concerns."

== Origin ==
An early reference to counting sheep as a means of attaining sleep can be found in Illustrations of Political Economy by Harriet Martineau, from 1834:

"It was a sight of monotony to behold one sheep after another follow the adventurous one, each in turn placing its fore-feet on the breach in the fence, bringing up its hind legs after it, looking around for an instant from the summit, and then making the plunge into the dry ditch, tufted with locks of wool. The process might have been more composing if the field might have been another man's property, or if the flock had been making its way out instead of in; but the recollection of the scene of transit served to send the landowner to sleep more than once, when occurring at the end of the train of anxious thoughts which had kept him awake." (vol. 7, pp. 117–118)

An even earlier reference can be found in Don Quixote by Miguel de Cervantes, from 1605 (the exception being Cervantes substituting "goats" for "sheep"):

"Let your worship keep count of the goats the fisherman is taking across, for if one escapes the memory there will be an end of the story, and it will be impossible to tell another word of it."

Cervantes probably adapted the story of counting goats from a story of counting sheep in the early twelfth-century Spanish work Disciplina clericalis. The section The King and his Story-teller (section 12) uses the idea of counting sheep humorously. Similar stories are listed in the Aarne–Thompson–Uther Index as ATU 2300, "Endless Tales" and are closely related to ATU 2301, "Corn Carried Away One Grain at A Time".

Several late 19th-century writers mention the use of counting sheep in order to aid sleep; the period of the 1860s–70s appears to be when it became a commonplace term, for example in Sabine Baring-Gould's Through flood and flame (1868): "She turned her face to the wall with a weary sigh, and endeavoured, by counting sheep going through a hedge-gap, to trick sleep into closing her eyelids." Macfarlane, Alexander William wrote about the technique in Insomnia and Its Therapeutics (1891).

== In popular culture ==
Serta, an American mattress manufacturer, uses animated sheep characters in its "Counting Sheep" advertising campaign, which it launched in 2000. The advertisements and characters were created by Aardman Animations.

In "Goodnight Mr. Bean", the thirteenth episode of the Mr. Bean television series, the titular character has difficulty falling asleep, only managing to do so after inaccurately counting a flock of sheep in a picture by means of a calculator.

In Shaun the Sheep Championsheeps, a 2012 series of sports-themed animated shorts, the "counting sheep" cliché is referenced in the episode titled "Steeplechase". In the short, Shaun and his fellow sheep participate in the steeplechase event. Bitzer the dog, who is the referee, and the other sheep and farm animals, who are spectators, all fall asleep watching Shaun and the other sheep running around the track and jumping over the hurdles.

The title of Philip K. Dick's science fiction novel Do Androids Dream of Electric Sheep? references this term.

== See also ==
- Yan Tan Tethera
- Black sheep
