= Joy & Inspiration =

Studio album by Crystal Gayle
- Released: 1997
- Recorded: 1996
- Studio: Crystal Sound; Image Sound
- Genre: Country; gospel
- Length: 67:33
- Label: Beautiful Music Company; Warner Special Products
- Producer: Crystal Gayle; Jay Patten; Bobby Wood

Crystal Gayle chronology
Someday (1995)	Joy & Inspiration (1997)	Crystal Gayle Sings the Heart and Soul of Hoagy Carmichael (1999)

Alternative cover
- 2008 re-release under the title, He Is Beautiful

Joy & Inspiration or He Is Beautiful is the twenty first studio album by American country music artist Crystal Gayle. It was released in 1997 via the Beautiful Music Company and Warner Special Products. The album was co-produced by Bobby Wood, Jay Patten, and Gayle. Joy and Inspiration would become her second album consisting of gospel music and would eventually be re-released and re-titled in 2008 under the name "He is Beautiful".

== Background and content ==
Joy and Inspiration draws on elements taken not only from gospel, but also from country and pop music. Gayle was inspired to record another album of gospel music because it brought back memories of her childhood. She often spent her early years singing inspirational songs with her mother and family. In 1997, Gayle discussed her reasoning behind the development of the recording,

"We never thought we were poor even though we had hard times. Mom always said, 'Keep God in your heart and you will always be the richest folks on Earth.' I draw my inspiration not only from God but from my special family and friends."

Joy & Inspiration originally contained twenty tracks of material. The twelfth track "Someday" had been previously issued on Gayle's 1995 studio album of the same name. The album included cover versions of popular gospel and inspirational songs. This included the tracks "Put Your Hand in the Hand", "One Day at a Time", and "Swing Low, Sweet Chariot". "He Is Beautiful to Me" was originally recorded by Gayle in 1982 for the studio album, True Love. The song was re-recorded for this album.

== Critical reception and release ==
Joy & Inspiration mainly received positive responses from music critics and journalists. Jim Allen of Allmusic praised Gayle's vocal effects and musical styles, "Crystal Gayle gained pop/country crossover stardom in the '70s with hits like “Don't It Make My Brown Eyes Blue,” but like so many great country artists, she had a strong gospel side to her musical personality. That spiritual side was expressed in the 1997 album HE IS BEAUTIFUL, where Gayle brought her sweet, supple vocal style to a batch of faith-based tunes. The music touches on pop, country, and gospel simultaneously, but the purity of intent is always there."

Joy & Inspiration was first released in 1997 and distributed as an audio cassette. In its initial issue, the album was released by both the Beautiful Music Company and Warner Special Products, a subsidiary of the larger Warner Bros. Records. It was re-issued as a compact disc on September 9, 2008, and was re-titled under the name He Is Beautiful. In this format, the album was released under the Demon Music Group.

== Track listing ==
Standard edition
No.	Title	Length
1.	"Give Me That Old Time Religion"	3:17
2.	"Amazing Grace"	3:00
3.	"What a Friend We Have in Jesus"	4:07
4.	"Softly and Tenderly"	3:49
5.	"I Believe"	2:29
6.	"Just a Closer Walk with Thee"	3:53
7.	"I Need Thee Every Hour"	3:18
8.	"One Day at a Time"	3:50
9.	"In the Garden"	3:24
10.	"He Is Beautiful to Me"	3:09
11.	"How Great Thou Art"	3:50
12.	"Someday"	4:12
13.	"Jesus Loves Me"	2:18
14.	"Old Rugged Cross"
15.	"Put Your Hand in the Hand"	3:07
16.	"He"	3:11
17.	"He's Got the Whole World in His Hands"
18.	"Nearer, My God, to Thee"	2:32
19.	"Swing Low, Sweet Chariot"	4:56
20.	"Let There Be Peace on Earth"	2:38

== Personnel ==
Credits are adapted from liner notes of Joy & Inspiration.

Musicians

- Crystal Gayle – lead vocals, harmony vocals
- Jeffrey Steinberg – keyboards, acoustic piano
- Bobby Wood – acoustic piano, keyboards, organ
- Jay Patten – keyboards, mandolin, saxophones
- Michael Loudermilk – guitars
- Mark Casstevens – acoustic guitar (11, 12)
- Chris Leuzinger – guitars (11, 12)
- Jim Ferguson – acoustic bass, harmony vocals, harmony vocal arrangements
- Michael Chapman – bass (11, 12)
- Jim White – drums, percussion
- Milton Sledge – drums (11, 12)
- Buddy Spicher – fiddle
- Michael Black – harmony vocals
- Yvonne Hodges – harmony vocals
- Louis Nunley – harmony vocals
- Cindy Richardson Walker – harmony vocals
- Lisa Silver – harmony vocals
- Dennis Wilson – harmony vocals
- Curtis Young – harmony vocals

Strings

- Jeffrey Steinberg – arrangements (1–9, 11–20)
- Charles Cochran – arrangements (10)
- David Angell, David Davidson, Carl Gorodetzky, Gerald Greer, Richard Grosjean, Anthony LaMarchina, Lynn Peithman, Pamela Sixfin, Elisabeth Small, Donald Teal, Gary Vanosdale and Mary Kathryn Vanosdale – string players

Children's Choir

- Evan Broder, Emily Elkins, Laura Johnson, Kali Legue, Caity McCollister and Brett Regan

=== Production ===
- Crystal Gayle – producer
- Jay Patten – producer (1–10, 13–17, 19, 20)
- Bobby Wood – producer (11, 12, 18)
- Ron Treat – engineer (1–10, 13–17, 19, 20)
- Steve Tillisch – engineer (11, 12)
- John Donegan – engineer (18)
- Randy Basham – assistant engineer
- Sound Stage Studios (Nashville, Tennessee) – mixing location
- Randy LeRoy – digital mastering at Final Stage Mastering (Nashville, Tennessee)
- Jeff Wolf and Image Maker, Inc. – cover photography, digital cinematography
