= Leslie Pearl =

American pop singer-songwriter (1952–2025)

- Born: Leslie Jan Pearl; July 26, 1952; Pennsylvania, U.S
- Died: June 18, 2025 (aged 72)
- Occupations: Songwriter, record producer
- Instruments: Keyboards, bass, vocals
- Labels: London, RCA
- Website: lesliepearl.com

Leslie Jan Pearl (July 26, 1952 – June 18, 2025) was an American songwriter, record producer and musician.

== Life and career ==
Born in Pennsylvania, Pearl wrote hits for Crystal Gayle, Kenny Rogers, Johnny Mathis and Dr. Hook, as well as writing the lyrics and music for the Karen Carpenter song "My Body Keeps Changing My Mind". Her songs were also recorded by Aretha Franklin, Randy Travis and Rascal Flatts.

In 1977, Pearl recorded her first album, Pearl, with her sister Deborah Pearl, on London Records. In 1982, she recorded a second album, Words & Music, this time for RCA Records. It yielded the Top 40 hit "If the Love Fits Wear It", which spent sixteen weeks on the Billboard Hot 100, peaking at number 28 in August 1982. It also peaked at number 7 on the Adult Contemporary chart and at number 25 on the Cashbox music chart. The song also charted on the Canadian Adult Contemporary chart, reaching number 16, and in Ireland, where it peaked at number 23.

Pearl also wrote a hit for Dr. Hook ("Girls Can Get It") and one for Crystal Gayle ("You Never Gave Up on Me"). She wrote and produced jingles for Pepsi, Folgers Coffee, Ford, Gillette and others. Composed in 1984, Pearl's Folgers coffee jingle was transformed into country, gospel, jazz, R&B, folk, Celtic and a cappella versions, and Folgers runs an annual contest to find the best new interpretation.

Pearl died on June 18, 2025, at the age of 72.

== Discography ==
- Pearl (London, 1977)
- Words & Music (RCA, 1982)
