= You Never Gave Up on Me =

Single by Crystal Gayle

from the album Hollywood, Tennessee
- B-side: "Tennessee"
- Released: February 20, 1982
- Genre: Country
- Length: 3:10
- Label: Columbia
- Songwriter(s): Leslie Pearl
- Producer(s): Allen Reynolds

Crystal Gayle singles chronology
"The Woman in Me" (1981)	"You Never Gave Up on Me" (1982)	"Livin' in These Troubled Times" (1982)

"You Never Gave Up on Me" is a song written by Leslie Pearl, and recorded by American country music artist Crystal Gayle. It was released in February 1982 as the second single from the album Hollywood, Tennessee. The song reached number 5 on the Billboard Hot Country Singles & Tracks chart.

== Charts ==
=== Weekly charts ===
Chart (1982)	Peak position
US Hot Country Songs (Billboard)	5
Canadian RPM Country Tracks	3

=== Year-end charts ===
Chart (1982)	Position
US Hot Country Songs (Billboard)	28
