= Sandy Mason =

American country music singer-songwriter (1939–2015)

Sandra Mason Theoret (December 18, 1939 – April 1, 2015) was an American country music singer-songwriter and musician. Apart from her numerous songwriting credits, she was also a pianist and guitarist, and provided backing vocals for other artists. In 1967, her single "There You Go" reached No. 64 on the Billboard country chart.

Mason gained biggest success as a songwriter. In 1979, her song "When I Dream", recorded by Crystal Gayle, reached No. 3 on the Billboard Hot Country Singles & Tracks chart. In 1998, the song "Two Piña Coladas" recorded by Garth Brooks reached No. 1 on the Billboard Hot Country Songs.

== Early life and career ==
Sandy Mason was born in Tarentum, Pennsylvania in 1939. As a child, she performed on the Pittsburgh radio and TV. In 1965, she started her own local television show on WTAE.. Later she appeared with Joe Negri on WTAE-TV co-costing the "Popeye and Friends" show where she and Joe played and sang on live TV in-between the cartoons.

In 1966, she was signed to Hickory Records. The song "There You Go", recorded on the label, was her lone chart success as a recording artist.

Mason provided backing vocals for other artists, Crystal Gayle: 1976 studio album Crystal (top 10 on the Billboard Top Country Albums), 1977 studio album We Must Believe in Magic; and Johnny Cash: 1982 studio album The Adventures of Johnny Cash.

=== Songwriting ===
The song "All I Wanna Do in Life", co-written with Allen Reynolds, was recorded by Marianne Faithfull and included on her studio album Dreamin' My Dreams (1976). The song was also recorded by Crystal Gayle (for her 1977 studio album We Must Believe in Magic) and George Jones (for his 1984 album Ladies' Choice).

Mason's other songwriting credits include "Only Love", co-written with Roger Cook and John Prine. It was recorded by Johnny Cash (for his 1982 studio album The Adventures of Johnny Cash), Don Williams (for his 1982 studio album Listen to the Radio), and Prine's version appeared on his studio album Aimless Love (1984).

Australian singer Colleen Hewett, recorded Mason-written songs "Since I Loved Like That" and "When I Dream" for her studio album Colleen (1983). "When I Dream" was also recorded by Helen Reddy for her studio album Play Me Out (1981), Willie Nelson for his studio album Partners (1986), and Nanci Griffith for her studio album Ruby's Torch (2006).

Her other songwriting credits include songs recorded by Dottie West: "I Heard Our Song" (from the 1969 album Makin' Memories), "You Take Me Home, Honey" (from the 1973 album Country Sunshine); Crystal Gayle: "What You've Done for Me" (from the 1975 studio album Somebody Loves You; top 20 on the Billboard Top Country Albums), "You'll Be Loved Someday" (from the 1979 album We Should Be Together), "Hands" (from the 1981 album A Woman's Heart); Debby Boone: "I'd Even Let You Go" (from the 1980 album Love Has No Reason); Johnny Cash: "After All" (recorded during the 1980s sessions, was released on his 2014 posthumous album Out Among the Stars).

== Death ==
Mason died in Ormond Beach, Florida, of complications from pancreatic cancer on April 1, 2015. She was 75.
