= You Don't Know Me: Classic Country =

Studio album by Crystal Gayle
- Released: September 6, 2019
- Genre: Country
- Length: 44:07
- Label: The Orchard; Southpaw
- Producer: Christos Gatzimos; Crystal Gayle

Crystal Gayle chronology
The Hits (2009)	You Don't Know Me: Classic Country (2019)

Singles from You Don't Know Me: Classic Country
- 1. "Ribbon of Darkness" Released: August 9, 2019

You Don't Know Me: Classic Country (or informally referred to as You Don't Know Me) is the twenty sixth studio album by American country artist Crystal Gayle. The record was released on September 6, 2019 via Southpaw Musical Productions and The Orchard. You Don't Know Me contains cover versions of classic country songs and features collaborations with other artists. The album marks Gayle's first studio release in sixteen years.

== Background ==
The album has been in the making for several years. In a 2017 interview, Gayle stated intentions to record an album of classic country material. The project was first titled Am I That Easy to Forget. You Don't Know Me was co-produced by Gayle and her son, Christos Gatzimos. The album consists of 14 classic country songs, including the title track. The latter was written by Cindy Walker and recorded by Eddy Arnold in 1955.

You Don't Know Me also includes cover versions of songs originally recorded by artists such as Patsy Cline, George Jones and Buck Owens. The album's lead single is the opening track "Ribbon of Darkness". The song was originally made successful in the United States by Marty Robbins, and later on by Connie Smith. "Ribbon of Darkness" was the first song Gayle performed on the Grand Ole Opry. The album's fourteenth track "Put It Off Until Tomorrow" features Gayle's siblings Loretta Lynn and Peggy Sue. It is the first time the siblings have recorded together.

Gayle recorded the album because she wanted to pay tribute to the music she was raised singing. In an interview with Music Row she commented, "It is filled with country classics that I grew up singing. They are very much a part of my history and I’ve been wanting to do this for a long time. I feel very lucky to have known and worked with many of the artists who had the original hits." She also wanted to record the album to expose Gatzimos to classic country music. In an interview with CMT Gayle explained, "I really started out the project with letting Christos see and hear what country music is really all about."

== Critical reception ==
Professional ratings
Review scores
Source	Rating
Allmusic	3/5 stars
Digital Journal	A

You Don't Know Me has received positive reviews from music critics and journalists. Stephen Thomas Erlewine of Allmusic gave the release 3 out of 5 stars, calling the production style "clean, precise, and spotless". Erlewine also noted that Gayle's upper register has "diminished" but is nonetheless "amiable". Erlewine would conclude his review by saying, "While the crisp sonics prevent You Don't Know Me from being as welcoming as a faded, familiar wrap, the intent is nevertheless appreciated and it's good to hear Gayle sound so engaged with the songs she is singing."

Markos Papadatos of the Digital Journal gave the album an "A" rating. He called Gayle's voice "rich" and "crystalline". To conclude, Papadatos said, "Overall, Crystal Gayle is sensational on her new album, You Don't Know Me, which is country as grits. Grab a bottle of wine and let this country queen lure you in with her timeless voice. Every song is polished and unique." Nancy Kruh of People praised Gayle's voice, calling it "smooth" and "silky".

== Commercial performance ==
In promotion of You Don't Know Me, the opening track "Ribbon of Darkness" was released as a digital download. The album was available for pre-ordering in August 2019. Although the album was released on Southpaw Musical Productions, it was distributed by BFD and The Orchard. Upon release, You Don't Know Me became Gayle's first studio album release to make a chart appearance since 1988. The album peaked at number 40 on the Billboard Top Independent Albums chart and number 27 on the Billboard Country Albums Sales chart.

The album has sold 1,900 copies in the United States as of November 2019.

== Track listing ==
You Don't Know Me: Classic Country
No.	Title	Writer(s)	Original Artist	Length
1.	"Ribbon of Darkness"	Gordon Lightfoot	Marty Robbins	2:54
2.	"You Win Again"	Hank Williams	Hank Williams	3:18
3.	"Please Help Me, I'm Falling"	Hal Blair; Don Robertson	Hank Locklin	3:33
4.	"Am I That Easy to Forget"	Carl Belew; W.S. Stevenson	Carl Belew	2:22
5.	"Hello Walls"	Willie Nelson	Faron Young	2:37
6.	"You Never Were Mine"	Jay Lee Webb	Jay Lee Webb	3:08
7.	"Just One More"	George Jones	George Jones	2:53
8.	"There Goes My Everything"	Dallas Frazier	Jack Greene	2:51
9.	"That's the Way Love Goes"	Lefty Frizzell; Sanger D. Shafer	Johnny Rodriguez	3:07
10.	"Crying Time"	Buck Owens	Buck Owens	3:26
11.	"I've Seen That Look on Me a Thousand Times"	Harlan Howard; Shirl Melete	Jim Ed Brown	3:17
12.	"Walkin' After Midnight"	Alan Block; Don Hecht	Patsy Cline	3:17
13.	"You Don't Know Me"	Cindy Walker	Eddy Arnold	3:16
14.	"Put It Off Until Tomorrow" (featuring Loretta Lynn and Peggy Sue)	Bill Owens; Dolly Parton	Bill Phillips	2:31

Bonus track
No.	Title	Writer(s)	Original artist	Length
15.	"I've Cried (The Blue Right Out of My Eyes)" (1969 demo recording)	Loretta Lynn	Crystal Gayle	2:26

== Personnel ==
All credits are adapted from Allmusic.

Musical personnel

- Crystal Gayle – lead vocals, background vocals
- Vickie Carrico – background vocals
- Jim Ferguson – background vocals
- Beth Hooker – background vocals
- Harry Stinson – background vocals
- Loretta Lynn – background vocals on “Put It Off Until Tomorrow”
- Peggy Sue – background vocals on “Put It Off Until Tomorrow”
- Chris Leuzinger – electric guitar
- Mike Loudermilk – acoustic guitar, electric guitar
- Mike Severs – acoustic guitar
- Mark Prentice – bass
- Rob Price – bass
- David Spicher – bass
- John Hobbs – piano
- Mark Rojas – piano, synthesizer
- Chris Walters – piano
- Lonnie Wilson – drums
- Duane Norman – drums
- Billy Contreras – fiddle
- Mike Johnson – steel guitar

Creative

- Cat Gatzimos – artwork
- Alexander Giavis – artwork
- Gor Megaera – cover photo

Technical

- Christos Gatzimos – engineering, mixing, producer
- Crystal Gayle – producer
- Charlie Johns – engineering
- Eric Prestidge – engineering
- Justin Shturtz – mastering
- Bill Walker – conductor, string arrangements

== Chart performance ==
Chart (2019)	Peak position
US Country Album Sales (Billboard)	27
US Independent Albums (Billboard)	40

== Release history ==
Region	Date	Format	Label	Ref.
United States	September 6, 2019	CD; digital download; vinyl	The Orchard; Southpaw	
