= We Must Believe in Magic =

Studio album by Crystal Gayle
- Released: June 24, 1977
- Genre: Country
- Length: 29:49
- Label: United Artists
- Producer: Allen Reynolds

Crystal Gayle chronology
Crystal (1976)	We Must Believe in Magic (1977)	I've Cried the Blue Right Out of My Eyes (1978)

Singles from We Must Believe In Magic
- 1. "Don't It Make My Brown Eyes Blue" Released: August 9, 1977

Professional ratings
Review scores
Source	Rating
AllMusic	3.5/5 stars
The Encyclopedia of Popular Music	3/5 stars
The New Rolling Stone Record Guide	2/5 stars

We Must Believe in Magic is the fourth studio album by American country music singer Crystal Gayle. Released on June 24, 1977, it became her highest selling album, reaching No. 2 on the Billboard Country Albums chart and No. 12 on the main Billboard album chart (her first album to enter the main chart and her only album to make the Top 30 there to date). It was certified platinum by the RIAA in 1978. The album also has the distinction of being the first platinum album recorded by a female artist in country music. It was also Gayle's first album to chart in the UK, where it reached No. 15, and was certified silver by the BPI. In the Netherlands, it stayed on the charts for two weeks and peaked at No. 29.

The album contains Gayle's huge international chart hit "Don't It Make My Brown Eyes Blue", which was not only her third No. 1 Country chart hit, but also reached No. 2 on the Billboard 100, becoming her biggest hit. Another track, "River Road", charted at No. 64 on the Country Singles chart when it appeared on the Favorites compilation album in 1980.

== Track listing ==
No.	Title	Writer(s)	Length
1.	"Don't It Make My Brown Eyes Blue"	Richard Leigh	2:37
2.	"I Wanna Come Back to You"	Johnny Christopher, Sam Hogin	2:54
3.	"River Road"	Sylvia Fricker Tyson	3:08
4.	"It's All Right with Me"	Cole Porter	2:32
5.	"Going Down Slow"	Bobby Bond	3:41
6.	"All I Wanna Do in Life"	Allen Reynolds, Sandy Mason Theoret	2:26
7.	"Make a Dream Come True"	Larry Kingston	3:06
8.	"Green Door"	Bob Davie, Marvin Moore	3:11
9.	"Funny"	Liz Anderson	2:05
10.	"We Must Believe in Magic"	Bob McDill, Reynolds	4:09

== Charts ==
Chart (1977/78)	Peak position
Australian (Kent Music Report)	47

== Personnel ==
- Gene Chrisman, Jimmy Isbell, Kenny Malone – drums, percussion
- Joe Allen, Mike Leech – bass guitar
- David Kirby, Johnny Christopher, Jimmy Colvard, Reggie Young, Allen Reynolds – guitars
- Lloyd Green – steel guitar
- Bobby Wood, Hargus "Pig" Robbins – keyboards
- Charles Cochran – keyboards, string and horn arrangements
- Shane Keister – synthesizers
- New Grass Revival, the Trolleycar Band – special effects
- Buddy Spicher, Sam Bush – fiddle
- Courtney Johnson – banjo
- Billy Puett – flute, clarinet
- Carl Gorodetsky, Gary Vanosdale, George Binkley, Lennie Haight, Marvin Chantry, Roy Christensen, Sheldon Kurland – strings
- Janie Fricke, Marcia Routh, Pebble Daniel, Sandy Mason Theoret, Garth Fundis – backing vocals

Production

- Produced by Allen Reynolds
- Engineered by Garth Fundis
