= I've Cried (The Blue Right Out of My Eyes) =

Single by Crystal Gayle
- B-side: "Sparklin' Look of Love"
- Released: August 1970
- Genre: Country
- Length: 2:42
- Label: Decca
- Songwriter(s): Loretta Lynn
- Producer(s): Owen Bradley

Crystal Gayle singles chronology
"I've Cried (The Blue Right Out of My Eyes)" (1970)	"Everybody Oughta Cry" (1972)

"I've Cried (The Blue Right Out of My Eyes)" is a song written by Loretta Lynn that was recorded by her sister, American country music artist Crystal Gayle. It was released as her debut single in 1970, becoming a minor hit on the Billboard country songs chart. Despite not becoming a major hit, the song is identified with Gayle's early career persona and has been considered among her essential songs in her recording career.

== Content and reception ==
"I've Cried (The Blue Right Out of My Eyes)" was first written by Loretta Lynn after Gayle signed her first recording contract to Decca Records (Lynn's label as well). Gayle had also done the original demo recording in 1969. The demo session was recorded at Surefire Music, a publishing company owned by The Wilburn Brothers. Gayle had been recording a series of demos at the publishing company before recording Lynn's composition. Gayle's version of the track was heard by Decca producer Owen Bradley. Liking what he heard, he asked if Gayle could record it officially for the Decca label. The official recording session took place circa 1970 in a session produced by Bradley in Nashville, Tennessee.

The song has received mixed critical reception since its release. In comparison with Gayle's later country pop material, "I've Cried (The Blue Right Out of My Eyes)" is often compared to the musical style of her sister, Loretta Lynn. Steve Huey of Allmusic called the song (along with her further Decca recordings) a "Little Loretta" record because of its similarities to her recordings. When reviewing an album that the song would later appear on, critic Jason Birchmeier noted that "the easy listening country-pop style Gayle would later employ with longtime producer Allen Reynolds is noticeably absent here, showcasing instead the singer's initial resemblance to her much grittier sister." Nonetheless, he also praised the track, calling it "noteworthy".

== Chart performance and release ==
"I've Cried (The Blue Right Out of My Eyes)" was released as a single in August 1970. Issued with Lynn's composition "Sparklin' Look of Love" on the B-side, the single peaked at number 23 on the Billboard Hot Country Singles chart. Additionally, the single would also peak at number 34 on the Canadian RPM Country Singles chart around the same time. The song became Gayle's first single to not only be released but to also become a top 40 hit. In 1978, the track would be reissued as a promotional single in concurrence with Gayle's 1978 compilation album, also titled I've Cried the Blue Right Out of My Eyes. The song charted again on both the Billboard and Canadian country surveys, reaching similar positions. It would also be the first time that the song would appear on an official album.

"I've Cried (The Blue Right Out of My Eyes)" has been considered one of Gayle's signature recordings. While not a major hit, the song reflected the early artistic persona Gayle displayed under Decca Records. The label encouraged Gayle to record in a similar style of that of her sister. Gayle's further singles for the Decca label would prove unsuccessful as well. Gayle reflected in a 2019 interview with CMT, saying "...I was trying to sing just like her. That’s why she said, 'Quit singing my songs. Don’t sing anything I would.' She said, 'You’ll only be compared' and I would have been."

== Track listings ==
7" single

- "I've Cried (The Blue Right Out of My Eyes)" – 2:42
- "Sparklin' Look of Love" – 1:59

== Charts ==
Chart (1970)	Peak position
Canada Country Songs (RPM)	34
US Hot Country Singles (Billboard)	23
Chart (1978)	Peak position
Canada Country Songs (RPM)	36
US Hot Country Singles (Billboard)	40
