= Three Good Reasons =

Studio album by Crystal Gayle
- Released: 1992
- Studio: Groundstar Labs (Nashville, Tennessee); Quad (Nashville, Tennessee); Sound Stage (Nashville, Tennessee); Sound Shop (Nashville, Tennessee); Masterfonics (Nashville, Tennessee)
- Genre: Country
- Length: 32:34
- Label: Liberty
- Producer: Buzz Stone

Crystal Gayle chronology
Ain't Gonna Worry (1990)	Three Good Reasons (1992)	Best Always (1993)

Three Good Reasons is an album by the American musician Crystal Gayle, released in 1992. Many of its songs are about the ending of a relationship. The title track was released as the album's first single. Gayle supported the album with a North American tour.

== Critical reception ==
Professional ratings
Review scores
Source	Rating
AllMusic	3/5 stars
USA Today	2.5/4 stars

The Ottawa Citizen wrote that Gayle's voice "retains its other-worldly quality, that cool distance that lets her pass through any song without getting the least bit involved in it." The Richmond Times-Dispatch called the album "a smart departure from the syrupy, pops-flavored crossover hits she had in the mid-'70s." The Miami Herald noted that "a bluesy rhythm track accents 'The Trouble With Me (Is You)' while Gayle delivers a sly, '40s style performance."

== Track listing ==
No.	Title	Writer(s)	Length
1.	"Why Cry?"	Jackson Leap	2:39
2.	"A Rose Between Two Thorns"	Gene Nelson, Robert Byrne	3:07
3.	"The Trouble with Me (Is You)"	L. Davis Lewis, Kim Williams	2:53
4.	"If the Phone Doesn't Ring, It's Me"	Jimmy Buffett, Will Jennings, Michael Utley	3:25
5.	"One Less Set of Footsteps"	Jim Croce	2:57
6.	"The Least That I Can Do"	Allen Holmes, James Dean Hicks, Roger Murrah	3:38
7.	"Love to, Can't Do"	Mark Wright, B. James Lowry	3:16
8.	"99% of the Time"	Paul Davis, Even Stevens, Hillary Kanter, Amy Sky	3:47
9.	"Living in Tears"	Tommy Polk, David Mills	2:55
10.	"Three Good Reasons"	Don Schlitz, David Wingo	3:57

== Personnel ==
- Crystal Gayle – lead vocals, backing vocals
- Joel Bouchillon – acoustic piano
- Ronnie Godfrey – acoustic piano
- Bobby All – acoustic guitar
- Chris Leuzinger – electric guitar
- Brian Smith – electric guitar
- Billy Joe Walker Jr. – acoustic guitar, electric guitar
- Sonny Garrish – steel guitar
- Ron De La Vega – bass
- Steve Turner – drums
- Rob Hajacos – fiddle
- Charles Cochran – string arrangements
- Bob Mason – cello
- Gary Vanosdale – viola
- Kristin Wilkinson – viola
- Conni Ellisor – violin
- Carl Gorodetzky – violin
- Lee Larrison – violin
- Ted Madsen – violin
- Pamela Sixfin – violin
- Jim Ferguson – backing vocals
- Wendell Mobley – backing vocals
- Cindy Richardson-Walker – backing vocals
- Harry Stinson – backing vocals
- Dennis Wilson – backing vocals

Production

- Buzz Stone – producer
- Mike Griffith – digital recording, overdub engineer
- Stephen Tillisch – digital recording, mixing
- Joel Bouchillon – recording assistant, assistant overdub engineer, mix assistant
- Todd Culross – recording assistant, assistant overdub engineer
- Milan Bogdan – digital editing
- Glenn Meadows – mastering at Masterfonics (Nashville, Tennessee)
- Virginia Team – art direction
- Jerry Joyner – design
- Mark Tucker – photography
- Mary Beth Felts – make-up
