= Ain't Gonna Worry =

Studio album by Crystal Gayle
- Released: July 2, 1990
- Recorded: 1989–1990
- Studio: Jack's Tracks (Nashville, Tennessee)
- Genre: Country
- Length: 32:55
- Label: Capitol Nashville
- Producer: Allen Reynolds

Crystal Gayle chronology
Nobody's Angel (1988)	Ain't Gonna Worry (1990)	Three Good Reasons (1992)

Professional ratings
Review scores
Source	Rating
Allmusic	4/5 stars

Ain't Gonna Worry is an album by the American country music singer Crystal Gayle. Released on July 2, 1990, it marked the end of her run of Billboard album chart appearances (though a Greatest Hits album would make the Top 100 Country Albums chart in 2007). The album was Gayle's first and only album for the Capitol Records label.

Though the album itself failed to chart, one of its tracks, "Never Ending Song of Love", reached number 72 on the Country Singles chart. It also included covers of "Once in a Very Blue Moon" (although writers Pat Alger and Eugene Levine had Gayle in mind when first penning the song) and "Faithless Love", songs previously associated with Nanci Griffith and Linda Ronstadt respectively. "What He's Doing Now" would later be a hit for its co-writer, Garth Brooks (as "What She's Doing Now").

== Track listing ==
No.	Title	Writer(s)	Length
1.	"Everybody's Reaching Out for Someone"	Dickey Lee, Allen Reynolds	2:44
2.	"It Ain't Gonna Worry My Mind"	Richard Leigh	2:46
3.	"Just an Old Love"	Charles John Quarto, Pete Wasner	3:35
4.	"Just Like the Blues"	Roger Brown	3:32
5.	"Whenever It Comes to You"	Susanna Clark, Richard Leigh	2:46
6.	"Never Ending Song of Love"	Delaney Bramlett	2:32
7.	"Once in a Very Blue Moon"	Pat Alger, Gene Levine	2:52
8.	"More Than Love"	Roger Cook, Bobby Wood	4:17
9.	"What He's Doing Now"	Pat Alger, Garth Brooks	3:26
10.	"Faithless Love"	John David Souther	4:25

== Personnel ==
- Crystal Gayle – lead vocals, harmony vocals (1, 4, 5, 8, 10), druid bell (10)
- Bobby Wood – keyboards (1, 3–9), acoustic piano (2), harmony vocals (6, 8)
- Pete Wasner – acoustic piano (3, 7), harmony vocals (6)
- Joey Miskulin – accordion (6)
- Chris Leuzinger – acoustic guitar (1, 3, 6), electric guitars (1–5, 7, 8, 9)
- Johnny Christopher – acoustic rhythm guitar (1), acoustic guitar (2–5, 8)
- Mark Casstevens – acoustic guitar (6, 7, 9)
- Stuart Duncan – mandolin (1)
- Bob Wray – bass (1–9)
- Milton Sledge – drums (1–9), percussion (6)
- Kenny Malone – congas (1)
- Kirk "Jelly Roll" Johnson – harmonica (2)
- Charles Cochran – string arrangements (2, 3, 5, 7, 9, 10), acoustic piano (10)
- The Nashville String Machine – strings (2, 3, 5, 7, 9, 10)
- Duncan Mullins – harmony vocals (1, 4, 10)
- Peggy Sue Wright – harmony vocals (1, 6)
- Craig Bickhardt – harmony vocals (2, 5, 6, 7, 8)
- Kathy Chiavola – harmony vocals (2, 5)
- Donna McElroy – harmony vocals (2, 5)
- Wayland Patton – harmony vocals (2, 5)
- Hurshel Wiginton – harmony vocals (2, 5)
- Cindy Richardson-Walker – harmony vocals (4, 9)
- Pat Alger – harmony vocals (6)
- Garth Brooks – harmony vocals (6)
- Beth Nielsen Chapman – harmony vocals (6, 7, 8)
- Julie Gold – harmony vocals (6)
- Jonathan Pierce Hildreth – harmony vocals (6)
- Kieran Kane – harmony vocals (6)
- Hal Ketchum – harmony vocals (6)
- David Kumin – harmony vocals (6)
- Richard Leigh – harmony vocals (6)
- David Mallett – harmony vocals (6)
- Kathy Mattea – harmony vocals (6)
- Jamie O'Hara – harmony vocals (6)
- Allen Reynolds – harmony vocals (6)
- Johnny Rodriguez – harmony vocals (6)
- Jim Rooney – harmony vocals (6)
- Randy VanWarmer – harmony vocals (6)
- Jon Vezner – harmony vocals (6)

=== Production ===
- Allen Reynolds – producer
- Mark Miller – recording, mixing
- Denny Purcell – mastering at Georgetown Masters (Nashville, Tennessee)
- Virginia Team – art direction
- Jerry Joyner – design
- Empire Studio – photography
- Mary Beth Felts – make-up
