= Nobody's Angel (Crystal Gayle album) =

Studio album by Crystal Gayle
- Released: September 1988
- Studio: Ocean Way Recording, (Hollywood, California); Sixteenth Avenue Sound, Audio Media Recording and MasterMix (Nashville, Tennessee).
- Genre: Country
- Length: 33:59
- Label: Warner Bros. Nashville
- Producer: Jim Ed Norman; Eric Prestidge

Crystal Gayle chronology
The Best of Crystal Gayle (1987)	Nobody's Angel (1988)	Ain't Gonna Worry (1990)

Singles from Nobody's Angel
- 1. "Nobody's Angel" Released: August 27, 1988

Professional ratings
Review scores
Source	Rating
Allmusic	2/5 stars

Nobody's Angel is an album by the American country music singer Crystal Gayle. Released in September 1988, the album peaked at number 63 on the Billboard Country Albums Chart.

The title track, "Nobody's Angel", peaked at number 22 on the Billboard Country Singles chart, and was Gayle's final Top 40 hit on that chart.

== Track listing ==
No.	Title	Writer(s)	Length
1.	"Nobody's Angel"	Karen Brooks, Randy Sharp	3:06
2.	"Prove Me Wrong"	Vince Gill, Don Schlitz	2:59
3.	"Old Habits Die Hard"	Graham Lyle, Terry Britten	3:37
4.	"Tennessee Nights"	Shawna Harrington-Buckhart, Jan Buckingham	3:28
5.	"When Love Is New"	Beth Nielsen Chapman	3:11
6.	"Hopeless Romantic"	Billy Vera	4:04
7.	"Love May Find You"	Wendy Waldman, Eric Kaz	3:17
8.	"Love Found Me" (with Dennis Locorriere)	Troy Seals, Eddie Setser, Dennis Locorriere	3:45
9.	"Heat"	Tom Campbell, Hugh Prestwood	3:23
10.	"After the Best"	Thom McHugh, Bernie Nelson	3:09

== Personnel ==
- Crystal Gayle – lead vocals, backing vocals (2)
- Mike Lawler – synthesizers
- Bob Carpenter – accordion (1), synthesized marimbas (1)
- David Innis – synthesizers (2, 5, 6, 7, 10)
- John Barlow Jarvis – acoustic piano (2, 3)
- Charles Cochran – electric piano (4, 10)
- Hargus "Pig" Robbins – acoustic piano (4)
- Dennis Burnside – acoustic piano (5)
- John Hobbs – acoustic piano (6, 7), electric piano (8, 9)
- Gary Prim – acoustic piano (8)
- Larry Byrom – acoustic guitar (1), electric guitar (2, 3, 4)
- Billy Joe Walker Jr. – electric guitar (1, 3), acoustic guitar (2, 4, 5)
- Steve Gibson – gut-string guitar (1), dobro (4), acoustic guitar (9)
- Paul Worley – acoustic guitar (2, 4)
- Dann Huff – electric guitar (3, 6–9)
- Dean Parks – electric sitar (3), acoustic guitar (6), electric guitar (7, 8, 9)
- Sonny Garrish – steel guitar (2, 4)
- Michael Rhodes – bass (1–4)
- Edgar Meyer – acoustic bass (5, 10)
- Neil Stubenhaus – bass (6–9)
- Paul Leim – drums (1–5), percussion (1, 2, 3)
- John Robinson – drums (6–9)
- Terry McMillan – congas (1, 3), percussion (2, 8), harmonica (4, 5)
- Mark O'Connor – fiddle (4)
- Charlie McCoy – harmonica (5)
- James Lassen – bassoon (5)
- The Nashville String Machine – strings (2, 5, 6, 7, 10)
- Carl Gorodetzky – concertmaster (2, 5, 6, 7, 10)
- Bergen White – string arrangements (2, 5, 6, 7, 10)
- Randy Sharp – backing vocals (1, 2, 3, 7, 9)
- Vince Gill – backing vocals (2, 6)
- Mac McAnally – backing vocals (2, 3, 7, 9)
- Gary Pigg – backing vocals (3, 9)
- Jim Photoglo – backing vocals (3, 4, 6)
- Pam Tillis – backing vocals (3)
- The Forester Sisters – backing vocals (4)
- Val & Birdie (Frank Saulino and James Valentini) – backing vocals (4, 8)
- Jesse Boyce – backing vocals (6, 8)
- Thomas Cain – backing vocals (6, 8)
- Joy Jackson – backing vocals (6, 8)
- Donna McElroy – backing vocals (6, 8)
- Jo Ann Neal – backing vocals (6, 8)
- Harry Stinson – backing vocals (6)
- Wendy Waldman – backing vocals (7)
- Gerald Dixon – backing vocals (8)
- Dennis Locorriere – lead and backing vocals (8)

=== Production ===
- Jim Ed Norman – producer
- Eric Prestidge – producer, engineer, mixing
- Joel Bouchillon – assistant engineer
- Lee Groitzsch – assistant engineer
- Daniel Johnston – assistant engineer, additional assistant engineer, mix assistant
- Bob Loftus – assistant engineer
- John David Parker – assistant engineer
- Kurt Storey – additional assistant engineer
- Jeff Giedt – mix assistant
- Ken Love – mastering at MasterMix (Nashville, Tennessee)
- Virginia Team – art direction
- Jerry Joyner – design
- Empire Studio – photography

== Chart performance ==
Chart (1988)	Peak position
U.S. Billboard Top Country Albums	63
