= Someday (Crystal Gayle album) =

Studio album by Crystal Gayle
- Released: 1995
- Studio: Reflections Studio, Quad Magnum Studio, Sound Emporium, Sound Stage Studios and Secret Sound (Nashville, Tennessee).
- Genre: Country, gospel
- Length: 37:14
- Label: Intersound
- Producer: Crystal Gayle, Bobby Wood

Crystal Gayle chronology
Best Always (1993)	Someday (1995)	Joy & Inspiration (1997)

Someday is the first gospel album by the American musician Crystal Gayle, released in 1995. It received a nomination for Best Southern, Country or Bluegrass Gospel Album at the Grammy Awards. Gayle had intended for years to do a gospel album, considering it to be a country music tradition.

== Critical reception ==
Professional ratings
Review scores
Source	Rating
The Encyclopedia of Popular Music	3/5 stars

The Orange County Register wrote that Gayle uses "a top-notch band, smart arrangements and her beautiful soprano to deliver an album that will satisfy listeners from the country music ranks as well as those who enjoy the religious works of Amy Grant and Stephen Curtis Chapman."

== Track listing ==
No.	Title	Writer(s)	Length
1.	"Anchor Deep"	Gary Harrison, Karen Staley	3:12
2.	"Diamonds from Dust"	Cindy Sterling, Brian Barrett	2:53
3.	"My Old Friend"	Jeff Silvey, Regie Hamm	3:42
4.	"He'll Be There"	Robert Ellis Orrall, Spady Brannan, David Malloy	2:41
5.	"I Saw the Light" medley: a) "I Saw the Light" b) "Somebody Touched Me" c) "I’ll Fly Away" d) "Jesus on the Main Line"	Hank Williams, Sr. P.D. P.D. P.D.	4:26
6.	"Someday"	Charles Bosarge, Tommy Greer, Mark Baldwin	4:12
7.	"Ageless Dancer"	Jess Leary, Bobby Taylor	2:55
8.	"Where Dear Friends Never Part"	Keith Little	3:02
9.	"Would You Believe"	Melvin Webb Jr., Bill Gatzimos	2:56
10.	"I Know, I Know"	Karla Worley	3:20
11.	"I Believe" medley: a) "I Believe" b) "Amazing Grace" c) "Old Rugged Cross" d) "Softly and Tenderly"	Ervin Drake, Irwin Graham, Jimmy Shirl, Al Stillman; P.D. George Bomer; Will L. Thompson	4:55

== Personnel ==
- Crystal Gayle – lead vocals, backing vocals
- Bobby Wood – acoustic piano, synthesizers, Hammond B3 organ, backing vocals
- Mark Casstevens – acoustic guitar, mandolin
- Chris Leuzinger – guitars
- Bruce Bouton – steel guitar
- Mike Chapman – bass
- Jim Ferguson – bass, backing vocals
- Milton Sledge – drums
- Tom Roady – congas, tambourine
- Rob Hajacos – fiddle
- Jay Patten – saxophone
- Mike Eldred – backing vocals
- Joy Gardner – backing vocals
- Bill Gatzimos – backing vocals
- Allen Reynolds – backing vocals
- Peggy Sue Wright – backing vocals
- Sonny Wright – backing vocals

Production

- Crystal Gayle – producer
- Bobby Wood – producer
- John Donegan – engineer, project coordinator, graphic design
- Ronny Light – engineer
- Steve Tillisch – engineer
- Ron Treat – engineer
- Joe Wilson – engineer
- Patrick Murphy – assistant engineer
- Mark Ralston – assistant engineer
- Nick Sparks – assistant engineer
- Craig White – assistant engineer
- Glenn Meadows – mastering at Masterfonics (Nashville, Tennessee)
- Ron Keith – photography
- Jill A. McCarthy – graphic design
