= Livin' in These Troubled Times =

Single by Crystal Gayle

from the album Hollywood, Tennessee
- B-side: "Ain't No Sunshine"
- Released: August 7, 1982
- Genre: Country
- Length: 3:26
- Label: Columbia
- Songwriter(s): Sam Hogin, Roger Cook, Philip Donnelly
- Producer(s): Allen Reynolds

Crystal Gayle singles chronology
"You Never Gave Up on Me" (1982)	"Livin' in These Troubled Times" (1982)	"You and I" (1982)

"Livin' in These Troubled Times" is a song written by Sam Hogin, Roger Cook and Philip Donnelly, and recorded by American country music artist Crystal Gayle. It was released in August 1982 as the third single from the album Hollywood, Tennessee. The song reached number 9 on the Billboard Hot Country Singles & Tracks chart.

== Chart performance ==
Chart (1982)	Peak position
US Hot Country Songs (Billboard)	9
Canadian RPM Country Tracks	30
