= A Crystal Christmas =

Studio album by Crystal Gayle
- Released: October 1986
- Recorded: Bullet Recording and The Loft (Nashville, Tennessee).
- Genre: Country
- Label: Warner Bros. Nashville
- Producer: Jim Ed Norman

Crystal Gayle chronology
Straight to the Heart (1986)	A Crystal Christmas (1986)	What If We Fall in Love? (1986)

A Crystal Christmas was the first holiday album by Crystal Gayle. All the songs on this album are classic holiday compositions with no new songs. It was released in October 1986.

== Track listing ==
No.	Title	Writer(s)	Length
1.	"White Christmas"	Irving Berlin	3:15
2.	"Oh Holy Night"	Traditional	3:08
3.	"Winter Wonderland"	Felix Bernard, Richard Smith	2:18
4.	"I'll Be Home for Christmas"	Kim Gannon, Walter Kent	4:23
5.	"Have Yourself a Merry Little Christmas"	Hugh Martin, Ralph Blane	3:48
6.	"Rudolph the Red-Nosed Reindeer"	Johnny Marks	2:54
7.	"Little Drummer Boy"	Katherine Davis, Henry Onorati, Harry Simeone	3:42
8.	"The Christmas Song"	Robert Wells, Mel Tormé	3:06
9.	"Jingle Bells"	Traditional	2:44
10.	"Silver Bells"	Jay Livingston, Ray Evans	4:07
11.	"Silent Night"	Traditional	2:57

== Personnel ==
- Crystal Gayle – vocals
- Alan Steinberger – acoustic piano
- David Innis – synthesizers
- Bob Patin – synthesizers
- Mark Casstevens – acoustic guitar
- Steve Gibson – acoustic guitar, electric guitars
- Chris Leuzinger – acoustic guitar, electric guitars
- Jay Patten – acoustic guitar, saxophones
- Duncan Mullins – bass
- Michael Rhodes – bass
- Eddie Bayers – drums
- Tony Newman – drums
- Jim Horn – saxophones, recorder
- The Nashville String Machine – orchestra
- Bergen White – orchestral arrangements and conductor
- Carl Gorodetzky – concertmaster
- Tom Brannon – backing vocals
- Lori Brooks – backing vocals
- Phil Forrest – backing vocals
- Sheri Huffman – backing vocals
- Lisa Silver – backing vocals
- Diane Tidwell – backing vocals
- Dennis Wilson – backing vocals

=== Production ===
- Jim Ed Norman – producer
- Eric Prestidge – recording, mixing
- Lee Groitzsch – recording assistant, mix assistant
- Bob Vogt – recording assistant, mix assistant
- Denny Purcell – mastering at Georgetown Masters (Nashville, Tennessee)
- Laura LiPuma – art direction, design
- John Forsman – photography

== Chart performance ==
Chart (1987)	Peak position
U.S. Billboard Top Country Albums	69
