= Ready for the Times to Get Better =

- Side A label of U.S. release

Single by Crystal Gayle

from the album Crystal
- B-side: "Beyond You"
- Released: January 18, 1978
- Studio: Jack's Tracks (Nashville, Tennessee)
- Genre: Country
- Length: 2:11
- Label: United Artists
- Songwriter(s): Allen Reynolds
- Producer(s): Allen Reynolds

Crystal Gayle singles chronology
"I've Cried (The Blue Right Out of My Eyes)" (1977)	"Ready for the Times to Get Better" (1978)	"Talking in Your Sleep" (1978)

"Ready for the Times to Get Better" is a song written by Allen Reynolds, and recorded by American country music artist Crystal Gayle. The song first appeared on Gayle's album Crystal in 1976 and was released as a single in January 1978. It was the fourth single from the album and Gayle's fourth number one on the U.S Billboard Hot Country Singles chart. The song spent a total of ten weeks on the chart.

The song was a major Adult Contemporary hit on the charts of both the U.S. (#3) and Canada (#4). It was also a modest crossover hit to the pop charts of both nations.

== Cover versions ==
The song was recorded by Marshall Chapman on her 1977 album Me, I'm Feelin' Free (Epic). Joe Sun recorded it in 1980; his version peaked at number 43 on the Hot Country Singles chart. It was also rendered as the Cantonese-language song "Mayflower" (五月荷花) by Agnes Chan on her 1980 album Ching Kip, San Sing, Lau Long Hak (情劫·晨星·流浪客). Other versions include those by Doc Watson, Cody Jinks (on his 2015 album, Adobe Sessions), and Billy Strings. The Million Dollar Band performed the song on an episode of 'Hee Haw'.

== Other uses ==
The Crystal Gayle version of the song is featured in the Roadshow edition of Quentin Tarantino's The Hateful Eight, but does not appear on the soundtrack album.

== Chart performance ==
=== Crystal Gayle ===
Chart (1978)	Peak position
US Hot Country Songs (Billboard)	1
US Billboard Hot 100	52
U.S. Billboard Hot Adult Contemporary Tracks	3
Canadian RPM Country Tracks	1
Canadian RPM Top Singles	60
Canadian RPM Adult Contemporary Tracks	4

=== Joe Sun ===
Chart (1980–1981)	Peak position
US Hot Country Songs (Billboard)	43
Canadian RPM Country Tracks	19
