= Miss the Mississippi =

Studio album by Crystal Gayle
- Released: September 1979
- Genre: Country
- Length: 34:44
- Label: Columbia
- Producer: Allen Reynolds

Crystal Gayle chronology
Classic Crystal (1979)	Miss the Mississippi (1979)	These Days (1980)

Singles from Miss the Mississippi
- 1. "Half the Way" Released: September 1979; 2. "It's Like We Never Said Goodbye" Released: February 1980; 3. "The Blue Side" Released: May 1980

Miss the Mississippi is a studio album by American country music singer Crystal Gayle. Released in September 1979, it peaked at No. 3 on the Billboard Country Albums chart.

The album was her first album for Columbia Records, and contained three Country top ten hits; "Half the Way" (No. 2), "It's Like We Never Said Goodbye" (No. 1) and "The Blue Side" (No. 8). "Half the Way" also reached No. 15 on the Billboard Hot 100 pop chart.

The album was certified gold by the RIAA in 1980.

== Critical reception ==
Professional ratings
Review scores
Source	Rating
AllMusic	3/5 stars

The New York Times wrote that "Gayle has a lovely voice and a seductive if somewhat mannered way with phrasing."

== Track listing ==
No.	Title	Writer(s)	Length
1.	"Half the Way"	Bobby Wood, Ralph Murphy	4:03
2.	"The Other Side of Me"	Neil Sedaka, Howard Greenfield	3:49
3.	"Room for One More"	Ted Lindsay	2:53
4.	"Don't Go My Love"	James Valentini, Frank Saulino	3:00
5.	"Dancing the Night Away"	Russell Smith, James H. Brown Jr.	3:41
6.	"It's Like We Never Said Goodbye"	Roger Greenaway, Geoff Stephens	3:32
7.	"The Blue Side"	David Lasley, Allee Willis	3:16
8.	"A Little Bit of the Rain"	Marcia Routh	2:59
9.	"Danger Zone"	Dave Loggins	3:36
10.	"Miss the Mississippi and You"	Bill Halley	3:47

== Personnel ==
- Guitar: Barry "Byrd" Burton, Chris Leuzinger, Jerry McEwen, Billy Sanford, Rod Smarr Steel Guitar: Lloyd Green
- Bass: Joe Allen, Spady Brannan, Joe Osborn
- Keyboards: Charles Cochran, Hargus "Pig" Robbins, Bobby Wood
- Drums, percussion: Gene Chrisman, Kenny Malone
- Harmonica: Terry McMillan
- Saxophone: Billy Puett, Denis Solee
- Strings: George Binkley, Marvin Chantry, Roy Christensen, Carl Gorodetzky, Lennie Haight, Sheldon Kurland,
  Willi Lehmann, Dennis Molchan, Bob Moore, Steven Smith, Samuel Terranova, Gary Vanosdale
- Horns: Roger Bissell, Dennis Good, Rex Peer, Terry Williams
- Backing Vocals: Spady Brannan, Vickie Carrico, Pebble Daniel, Garth Fundis, Jennifer Kimball, Allen Reynolds,
  Marcia Routh, Frank Saulino, Jim Valenti

Production

- Produced by Allen Reynolds
- Recorded and engineered by Garth Fundis
