= The Woman in Me (Crystal Gayle song) =

Single by Crystal Gayle

from the album Hollywood, Tennessee
- B-side: "Crying in the Rain"
- Released: October 10, 1981
- Genre: Country
- Length: 2:29
- Label: Columbia
- Songwriter: Susan Marie Thomas
- Producer: Allen Reynolds

Crystal Gayle singles chronology
"Too Many Lovers" (1981)	"The Woman in Me" (1981)	"You Never Gave Up on Me" (1982)

"The Woman in Me" is a song written by Susan Marie Thomas, and recorded by American country music artist Crystal Gayle. It was released in October 1981 as the first single from the album Hollywood, Tennessee. The song reached number 3 on the Billboard Hot Country Singles & Tracks chart, remaining there for three weeks. "The Woman in Me" did well on Adult Contemporary chart and was a minor crossover pop hit.

== Chart performance ==
Chart (1981)	Peak position
Canadian RPM Country Tracks	2
U.S. Billboard Adult Contemporary	17
US Hot Country Songs (Billboard)	3
US Billboard Hot 100	76
