= In My Arms (album) =

Studio album by Crystal Gayle
- Released: October 31, 2000
- Genre: Children's
- Length: 1:01:21
- Label: Madacy
- Producer: Steve Ivey; Denny Jiosa

Crystal Gayle chronology
Crystal Gayle Sings the Heart and Soul of Hoagy Carmichael (1999)	In My Arms (2000)	All My Tomorrows (2003)

In My Arms is the twenty third studio album released by American country artist Crystal Gayle. The album was released on October 31, 2000, via Madacy Entertainment. It was Gayle's first and only studio album consisting of children's music.

== Background and reception ==
In My Arms was recorded in 2000. The album was produced by Steve Ivey and Denny Jiosa. This was the first collaboration between Gayle and the producers. The album was also Gayle's first album of children's music. The album contains a variety of children's songs, including lullabies. Among the album's lullabies are "Crystal Moon" and "The Last Ray of Sunshine".

The album was released on October 31, 2000, via Madacy Entertainment. In My Arms was reviewed by Allmusic's Rick Cohoon, who gave the release 3.5 of 5 stars. Cohoon praised Gayle's voice, calling it "soothing" and "rich". He concluded by saying, "You won't find dancing purple dinosaurs here, but what you will find is comfort and peace...whether you are three or 103."

== Track listing ==
All songs composed by Steve Ivey and Denny Jiosa.

In My Arms
No.	Title	Length
1.	"In My Arms"	4:29
2.	"What Will I Be Tomorrow"	3:20
3.	"Little Puppy"	2:59
4.	"Crystal Moon"	3:18
5.	"The Light in Your Heart"	4:34
6.	"Carousel"	3:19
7.	"The Last Ray of Sunshine"	3:42
8.	"Counting Sheep Around the World"	5:07
9.	"Panda Prayer"	3:25
10.	"Peaceful Night"	1:52
11.	"Fly to the Highest Mountain"	4:29
12.	"Tomorrow"	3:12
13.	"Princess"	3:00
14.	"By the Light"	3:19
15.	"Light Inside"	4:35
16.	"Round and Round"	3:15
17.	"Star Dance"	3:26
Total length:		1:01:21

== Personnel ==
All credits are adapted from Allmusic.

Musicians

- Crystal Gayle – lead vocals (1–9)
- Charles Cochran – acoustic piano
- Steve Ivey – keyboards, accordion, guitars, percussion
- Denny Jiosa – keyboards, guitars, mandolin, percussion
- Tom Reynolds – keyboards
- Tim Lauer – accordion
- Jeff Lisenby – accordion
- Chris Kent – bass
- Eric Darken – percussion
- Jim Hoke – soprano saxophone
- Jay Patten – saxophones
- Hollie Farris – flugelhorn
- Gary Tussing – cello
- Ellen Dockery – backing vocals (1–9)
- Reggie Smith – backing vocals (1–9)

Creative

- Kisa Kavass – cover photography
- Ingrid Stockbauer – cover design

Technical

- Steve Ivey – producer
- Denny Jiosa – producer
- Ken Love – mastering at MasterMix (Nashville, Tennessee)
