= Hollywood, Tennessee =

Studio album by Crystal Gayle
- Released: August 1981
- Genre: Country
- Length: 27:24
- Label: Columbia
- Producer: Allen Reynolds

Crystal Gayle chronology
These Days (1980)	Hollywood, Tennessee (1981)	A Woman's Heart (1981)

Professional ratings
Review scores
Source	Rating
AllMusic	2.5/5 stars

Hollywood, Tennessee is the ninth studio album by American country music singer Crystal Gayle. Released in August 1981, it peaked at #5 on the Billboard Country Albums chart.

As the title intends to suggest, half of the album was produced in a pop music style, whilst the other half was produced in a "Tennessee" country music style. It includes four singles released in 1982 and 1983 which appeared on the Billboard Country charts: "The Woman in Me" (#3), "You Never Gave Up on Me" (#5), "Living in These Troubled Times" (#9), and "Keepin' Power" (#49).

== Track listing ==
No.	Title	Writer(s)	Length
1.	"Keepin' Power"	Roger Cook, Bobby Wood	3:05
2.	"The Woman in Me"	Susan Marie Thomas	2:29
3.	"Ain't No Sunshine"	Bill Withers	3:27
4.	"You Never Gave Up on Me"	Leslie Pearl	3:18
5.	"Hollywood"	Cook, Charles Cochran	2:25
6.	"Livin' in These Troubled Times"	Cook, Philip Donnelly, Sam Hogin	3:12
7.	"Love Crazy Love"	Deborah Allen, Rafe Van Hoy	2:37
8.	"Lean on Me"	Bill Withers	2:38
9.	"Crying in the Rain"	Carole King, Howard Greenfield	2:16
10.	"Tennessee"	Cook	1:57

== Personnel ==
- Crystal Gayle - lead vocals
- Chris Leuzinger, Jon Goin - guitar
- Joe Allen, Tommy Cogbill - bass
- Alan Steinberger - keyboards
- Charles Cochran - keyboards, vibraphone, string arrangements
- Bobby Wood - piano
- Gene Chrisman, Kenny Malone - drums, percussion
- Buddy Spicher - fiddle, mandolin
- Wanda Vick - mandolin
- Denis Solee - saxophone
- Billy Puett, Sam Levine - flute
- The Sheldon Kurland Strings - strings
- Dennis Good - horn arrangements

Technical

- Garth Fundis - recording, mixing
- Virginia Team - art direction
- Norman Seeff - photography

== Charts ==
=== Weekly charts ===
Chart (1981–1982)	Peak position
US Billboard 200	99
US Top Country Albums (Billboard)	5

=== Year-end charts ===
Chart (1982)	Position
US Top Country Albums (Billboard)	24
