= Crystal (Crystal Gayle album) =

Studio album by Crystal Gayle
- Released: August 6, 1976
- Studio: Jack's Tracks (Nashville, Tennessee)
- Genre: Country
- Length: 28:03
- Label: United Artists
- Producer: Allen Reynolds

Crystal Gayle chronology
Somebody Loves You (1975)	Crystal (1976)	We Must Believe in Magic (1977)

Singles from Crystal
- 1. "You Never Miss a Real Good Thing (Till He Says Goodbye)" Released: October 11, 1976; 2. "I'll Do It All Over Again" Released: March 26, 1977; 3. "Ready for the Times to Get Better" Released: January 18, 1978

Professional ratings
Review scores
Source	Rating
Allmusic	3.5/5 stars

Crystal is the third studio album by American country music artist Crystal Gayle. The album rose to the number 7 spot on the Billboard Country Albums chart. It was released on August 6, 1976. It contained four charting singles, including two number 1 hits: "You Never Miss a Real Good Thing (Till He Says Goodbye)" and "Ready for the Times to Get Better." Another single, "I'll Do It All Over Again," just barely missed being the third chart-topper, stalling out at number 2, while "One More Time (Karneval)" could only rise to number 31.

== Track listing ==
No.	Title	Writer(s)	Length
1.	"I'll Do It All Over Again"	Bob McDill, Wayland Holyfield	2:52
2.	"Oh My Soul"	Marcia Routh	2:18
3.	"Ready for the Times to Get Better"	Allen Reynolds	2:11
4.	"Come Home Daddy"	Tina Newkirk	2:44
5.	"One More Time (Karneval)"	Joachim Heider, Christian Heilburg, Bryan Blackburn	3:55
6.	"You Never Miss a Real Good Thing (Till He Says Goodbye)"	McDill	3:47
7.	"Right in the Palm of Your Hand"	McDill	3:03
8.	"Forgettin' 'Bout You"	Reynolds, Don Williams	2:27
9.	"Let's Do It Right"	Richard Leigh, Richard Mainegra	2:04
10.	"I'm Not So Far Away"	Garth Fundis	2:42

== Personnel ==
- Crystal Gayle – vocals
- Chris Leuzinger, Jimmy Colvard – electric guitar
- Allen Reynolds, David Kirby, Garth Fundis, Jimmy Colvard – acoustic guitar
- Lloyd Green – steel guitar, resonator guitar
- Buddy Spicher – fiddle
- Joe Allen – bass
- Bobby Wood – keyboards
- Charles Cochran – keyboards, string and horn arrangements
- Jimmy Isbell – drums, percussion
- Allen Reynolds, Garth Fundis, Sandy Mason, Crystal Gayle – backing vocals
- Billy Puett, Dennis Good, Don Sheffield – horns
- Carl Gorodetzky, Gary Vanosdale, George Binkley III, Lennie Haight, Marvin Chantry, Roy Christensen, Sheldon Kurland – strings
- The Trolley Car Band – special effects

== Charts ==
=== Weekly charts ===
Chart (1976)	Peak position
US Top Country Albums (Billboard)	7

=== Year-end charts ===
Chart (1977)	Position
US Top Country Albums (Billboard)	6
