= Crystal Gayle =

American country music singer (born 1951)

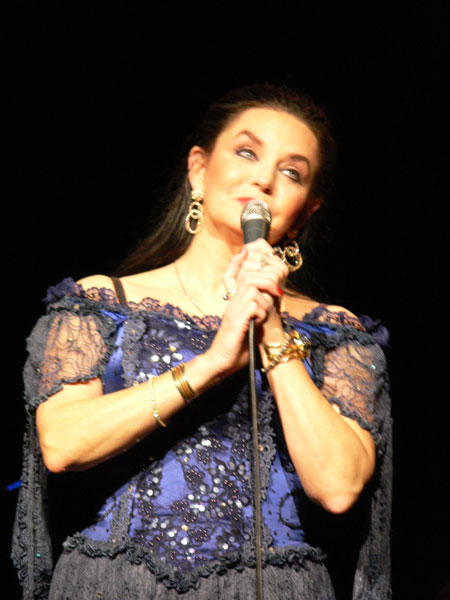
- Gayle performing in 2007
- Born: Brenda Gail Webb; January 9, 1951 (age 75); Paintsville, Kentucky, U.S.
- Occupations: Singer; songwriter
- Years active: 1969–present
- Known for: "Don't It Make My Brown Eyes Blue"
- Spouse: Vassilios "Bill" Gatzimos (m. 1971)
- Children: 2
- Relatives: Loretta Lynn (sister); Jay Lee Webb (brother); Peggy Sue (sister)
- Awards: Full list
- Musical career
- Genres: Country; country pop; folk; gospel; jazz
- Instrument: Vocals
- Labels: Decca; United Artists; Columbia; Elektra; Warner Bros.; Capitol; Liberty; Intersound; Madacy; The Orchard; Southpaw
- Website: crystalgayle.com

Brenda Gail Webb (born January 9, 1951), known professionally as Crystal Gayle, is an American country music singer widely known for her 1977 hit "Don't It Make My Brown Eyes Blue". Initially, Gayle's management and record label were the same as that of her oldest sister, Loretta Lynn. Not finding success with the arrangement after several years, and with Lynn's encouragement, Gayle decided to try a different approach. She signed a new record contract and began recording with Nashville producer Allen Reynolds. Gayle's new sound was sometimes referred to as middle-of-the-road (MOR) or country pop, and was part of a bigger musical trend by many country artists of the 1970s to appeal to a wider audience. Subsequently, Gayle became one of the most successful crossover artists of the 1970s and 80s. She is also known for her floor-length hair.

Gayle was said to have begun her career in the 1960s performing as a background singer in Lynn's band (although Gayle says this actually never happened). Lynn helped her sign a recording contract with Decca Records in 1970. Having minor success, she was encouraged to develop her own musical identity. Under the direction of producer Reynolds at United Artists Records, Gayle shifted towards a country pop style that was more successful. In 1975, "Wrong Road Again" became Gayle's first major hit. However, it was in 1977 when Gayle achieved her biggest success with "Don't It Make My Brown Eyes Blue". The single topped the Billboard country chart, crossed over to the top five of the Billboard Hot 100 and became a major international hit.

Gayle continued having success from the late 1970s and through late 1980s. Her biggest hits included "Ready for the Times to Get Better" (1977), "Talking in Your Sleep" (1978), "Half the Way" (1979) and "You and I" (1982). In the 1990s, Gayle shifted artistic directions by recording various genres of music. This included an album of inspirational music titled Someday (1995) and an album of standards called Crystal Gayle Sings the Heart and Soul of Hoagy Carmichael (1999). During the decade she also owned and operated a fine arts shop called Crystal's Fine Gifts and Jewelry. Her most recent studio release was in 2019 and Gayle has since continued to tour throughout the world.

Gayle has won one Grammy Award and has been nominated for several others since the 1970s. She has also won five Academy of Country Music awards; those awards include receiving the Cliffie Stone Pioneer Award in 2016. In addition, she has won two Country Music Association awards and three American Music Awards. Rolling Stone ranked her among the 100 greatest country artists of all time and CMT ranked her within their list of the 40 greatest women of country music. Gayle has her own star on the Hollywood Walk of Fame and was inducted as a member of the Grand Ole Opry in 2017.

== Early life ==
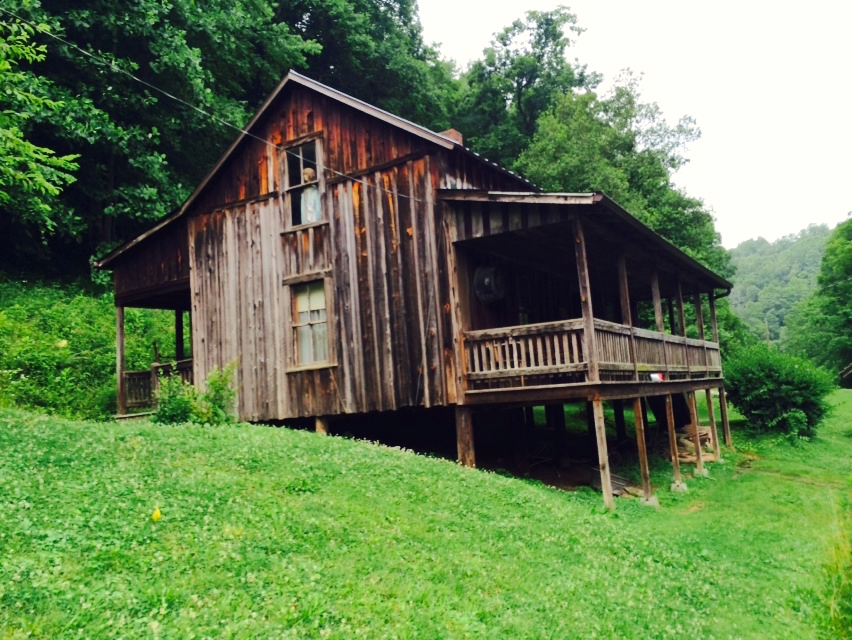
Webb family home

Gayle was born Brenda Gail Webb in Paintsville, Kentucky on January 9, 1951. She was the last of eight children born to Clara Marie "Clary" (née Ramey; May 5, 1912 – November 24, 1981) and Melvin Theodore "Ted" Webb (June 6, 1906 – February 22, 1959). Unlike her siblings Melvin, Loretta, Herman, Jay Lee, Donald, Peggy Sue, and Betty, Gayle was the only child born at the Paintsville hospital, and not at home. Through her matriline, Gayle is a distant cousin of singer Patty Loveless. Gayle and her siblings claim Irish and Cherokee descent, although she is not enrolled with any Native tribe. Gayle's father was a coal miner who developed black lung disease. In search of better medical treatment, the family moved to Wabash, Indiana, when Gayle was four years old. They lived in a retired miner's community and Clara Webb worked as a nurse's aide. Ted Webb died from a stroke in 1959. From an early age, Gayle had an interest in singing. She noted that she could sing before she could walk. The family's new home in Wabash was more suburban than Butcher Hollow and allowed her to experience both rural and urban life. She sang along frequently to songs she heard on the radio and was inspired by the music of her sister Loretta Lynn.

Gayle's musical interests were shaped further in her teenage years. She started singing in church, performed folk songs, and recorded demonstration tapes. With encouragement from Lynn, she began touring during summers in high school. At age 16, Gayle performed on the Grand Ole Opry in replacement of her sister who had gotten ill. She performed a cover of Gordon Lightfoot's "Ribbon of Darkness". After graduating from Wabash high school in 1970, she signed her first recording contract with her sister's label: Decca Records. Upon signing with Decca, the label insisted that Gayle change her first name from "Brenda" to another name. The conflict was because Brenda Lee was already signed to Decca at the time. Shortly thereafter, Lynn drove past a sign for the Krystal fast-food restaurant and said to Gayle, "That's your name. Crystals are bright and shiny, like you." It was then that she changed her name professionally to "Crystal Gayle", with "Gayle" taken from her middle name (Gail).

== Career ==
=== 1969–1976: Decca Records and musical shifts ===
Gayle was first managed by Oliver Lynn (Loretta Lynn's husband) after signing with Decca Records. Among her first professional gigs were routine appearances on Jim Ed Brown's television show The Country Place. On the program, Gayle performed original songs written by Loretta Lynn including "Sparklin' Look of Love" and "Mama, It's Different This Time". Her debut single was released in 1970 titled "I've Cried (The Blue Right Out of My Eyes)". Also written by Lynn, the song peaked within the top 40 of the [[Hot Country Songs|Billboard Hot Country Singles chart. The song was followed by other singles that reached minor positions on the country songs chart: "Everybody Oughta Cry" (1972) and "I Hope You're Havin' Better Luck Than Me" (1972). Gayle's career stalled while at the Decca label. This was because the label wanted Gayle to record in the same style as her sister. Steve Huey of AllMusic criticized her early singles, calling them "little Loretta records". Writers Mary A. Bufwack and Robert K. Oermann noted that Gayle was "probably stigmatized" for being the sibling of Loretta Lynn. In a 2019 interview with Forbes, Gayle reflected on the experience, "It didn't take me long to realize I was only there because I was Loretta's sister." During this period, Lynn gave Gayle advice that prompted her to expand her musical styles. Lynn said, "quit singing my songs...We have one Loretta Lynn and we don't need another." The conversation led Gayle to ultimately leave Decca in 1974.

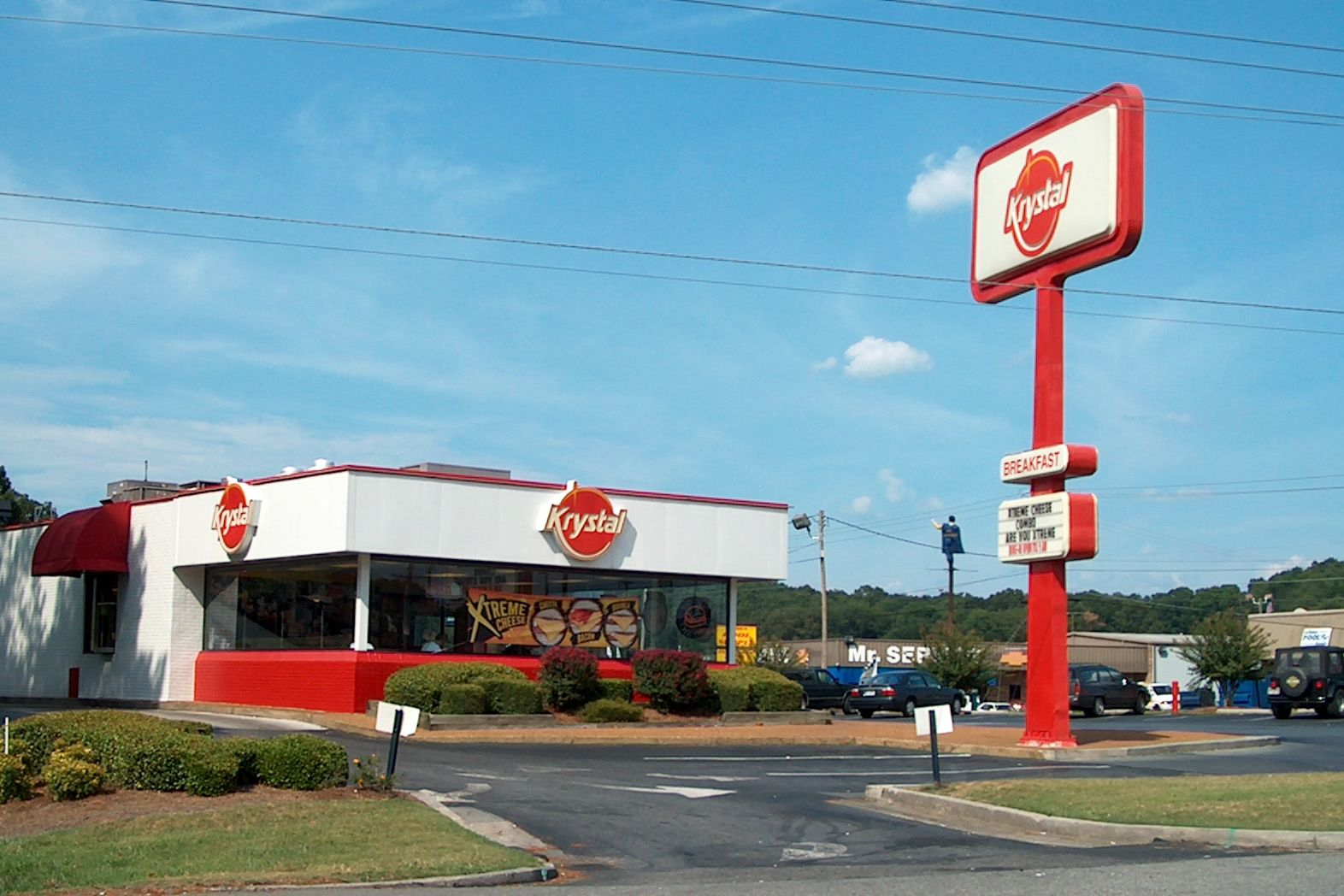
Krystal burgers, inspiration for Crystal Gayle's stage name

Gayle signed a new recording contract with United Artists Records in 1974. Under the direction of producer Allen Reynolds, her musical style shifted. Reynolds (who had recent success producing Don Williams) encouraged Gayle to record in a softer, mellower format. He also helped market her music towards a crossover audience. Gayle also released her first United Artists single in 1974, "Restless". Mary Bufwack and Robert Oermann called the song "assertive" and "sexy". The song peaked at number 39 on the Billboard country songs chart. The same year, Gayle's self-titled debut album was issued, reaching number 25 on the Billboard Top Country Albums survey. The following year, she had her first top ten hit on the country chart with "Wrong Road Again", also written by Allen Reynolds. She had minor hits with the singles "This Is My Year for Mexico" (1975) and "Beyond You" (1975). The latter song was co-written by Gayle and her husband, Bill Gatzimos. Her second studio album Somebody Loves You spawned a second top 10 hit: the title track.

Gayle's shift towards country pop was received better than her earlier recordings with Decca. Kurt Wolff of Country Music: The Rough Guide praised the new style, calling it a "pleasant, easygoing sort of country-folk blend – a close cousin to music of Emmylou Harris." Encyclopedic writer Collin Larkin called her new music approach to have the "easygoing charm" of records by Don Williams. Oermann and Bufwack called the new style "ear-catching" and praised Allen Reynolds's "gentle rhythm productions."

Reynolds had limited time to write material for Gayle. Instead, he arranged for songwriters Bob McDill and Richard Leigh to help compose music. This arrangement proved successful when in 1976, Gayle had her first number 1 hit on the Billboard Hot Country Singles chart with "I'll Get Over You", written by Leigh. This was followed by a second number 1 hit, "You Never Miss a Real Good Thing (Till He Says Goodbye)", and the number 2 hit, "I'll Do It All Over Again". Her third studio album, Crystal, was released in 1976, peaking at number 7 on the Top Country Albums chart.

=== 1977–1979: Crossover breakthrough ===
Producer Allen Reynolds believed Gayle was poised to have crossover pop success if the right song were found. In 1977, Richard Leigh had composed a tune called "Don't It Make My Brown Eyes Blue". The song was originally intended for British singer Shirley Bassey. When Reynolds heard the song he said to Leigh, "You're not sending that song anywhere." As was common practice at the time, according to the documentary the track was recorded alongside a guide or scratch vocal, which Gayle recorded in one take. Going back later to re-record the final production vocal, after several tries, she said she couldn't get the same feeling back as in the original, so this was kept as the master.

"Don't It Make My Brown Eyes Blue" was released as a single in 1977, peaking at number 1 on the Billboard Hot Country Singles chart and crossing over to number 2 on the Billboard Hot 100. Internationally, it became a hit in several countries including the United Kingdom, where it reached the number 5 position. Since its release, "Don't It Make My Brown Eyes Blue" has been received positively by music critics and fans. They have also considered it her signature song. Stephen Thomas Erlewine of AllMusic praised Gayle's vocals, commenting, "She never stressed it too heavily, nor were her vocals cloying — they were pretty and straightforward, making the song quite alluring."

"Don't It Make My Brown Eyes Blue"
Gayle's signature song and her first to become a major country pop crossover hit (1977).

Gayle's fourth studio record, We Must Believe in Magic, was also released in 1977. The album peaked at number 2 on the Billboard country albums chart and number 12 on the Billboard 200. We Must Believe in Magic has received positive reviews since its initial release. AllMusic gave the record 3.5 out of 5 stars. Paul Dennis of My Kind of Country gave the album a "Grade A" rating, calling it "an eclectic mix of songs ranging from pop standards to rock 'n' roll hits to songs by contemporary country songsmiths." We Must Believe in Magic became the first album by a female country artist to certify platinum in sales by the Recording Industry Association of America. In 1978, Gayle earned the Grammy Award for Best Female Country Vocal Performance for "Don't It Make My Brown Eyes Blue", while Leigh won a Grammy for Best Country Song.

In 1978, her fifth studio album When I Dream was released, also reaching number 2 on the country albums chart. The album peaked at number 52 on the Billboard 200 and certified by platinum by the RIAA. When I Dream also received positive reviews, garnering 3 out of 5 stars from AllMusic and another "Grade A" rating from My Kind of Country. Its lead single was the Roger Cook-penned "Talking in Your Sleep". It became a number 1 country single and crossed over to number 18 on the Hot 100. "Talking in Your Sleep" became Gayle's second international hit as well, peaking at number 11 in the United Kingdom. The album also included the hits "Why Have You Left the One You Left Me For" and the title track. By the end of 1978, Gayle had won "Female Vocalist of the Year" from both the Academy of Country Music and the Country Music Association. Before departing from the United Artists label, her sixth studio album We Should Be Together (1979) was released. It featured the two top-ten hits: "Your Kisses Will" and "Your Old Cold Shoulder".

=== 1979–1989: Continued crossover success ===
In 1979, Gayle moved to Columbia Records, bringing Reynolds with her. Under Columbia, Gayle began recording more cover versions of songs. This decision received praise from music critics, who credited her for being "versatile". Her seventh studio album, Miss the Mississippi was released in 1979 as well. It featured three major hits including "Half the Way", which became her third crossover pop hit. Miss the Mississippi peaked at number 3 on the Billboard Top Country Albums chart number 36 on the Billboard 200 and certified gold in sales from the RIAA. Gayle's eighth studio release These Days (1980) spawned two more number 1 singles on the Billboard Hot Country Singles chart: "If You Ever Change Your Mind" and "Too Many Lovers". In 1981, Gayle's ninth studio album Hollywood, Tennessee peaked at number 5 on the country albums chart and number 99 on the Billboard 200. Although commercially successful, it received mixed critical reviews. Mary A. Bufwack and Robert K. Oermann said that the album "symbolized her uptown inspirations" and Jason Ankeny of AllMusic gave the album only 2.5 out of 5 stars. Hollywood, Tennessee spawned three major hits on the Billboard country songs chart. This included the crossover hit, "The Woman in Me", and the social awareness tune, "Livin' in These Troubled Times".

As Gayle's music crossed multiple genres, she made more appearances outside of the Nashville establishment. Among these was hosting two prime time television specials: The Crystal Gayle Special (1979) and Crystal (1980). Both shows aired on CBS and were given critical acclaim. Gayle would also appear with Bob Hope on his 1979 television special called On the Road to China. For the special, Gayle and Hope taped a performance on the Great Wall of China. The special made Gayle the first artist to film a performance on the Great Wall.

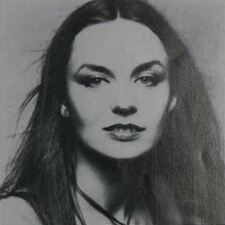
Gayle in Billboard magazine, 1977.

In 1982, Gayle collaborated with Tom Waits on the soundtrack of Francis Ford Coppola's film One from the Heart. Originally, Bette Midler was chosen for the project but dropped out due to scheduling conflicts. At first the soundtrack was delayed by Columbia Records due to a dispute with Coppola's Zoetrope Studios. When it was released, the soundtrack received positive reviews. Thom Jurek of AllMusic gave the release 4.5 out of 5 stars, who called it "one of the most beautifully wrought soundtrack collaborations in history". Steve Pond of Rolling Stone called it "a dreamy series of duets with Crystal Gayle that drift in and out of the film, comment on the action and supply some crucial transitions."

Also in 1982, Gayle moved from Columbia to Elektra Records, which would later merge with Warner Bros. Among the first recordings was a duet with Eddie Rabbitt titled "You and I". The song reached number 1 on the Billboard Hot Country Singles chart and became her second top 10 hit on the Billboard Hot 100. Gayle's first studio album with Elektra would also be issued in 1982, True Love. First produced by Allen Reynolds, when the album was presented to Jimmy Bowen (Elektra's division head), he commented that it "rocked too much". For these reasons, Bowen decided to produce three additional tracks for the album. The album would receive a mixed reception. In Billboard Magazine's initial review, they praised Gayle's vocals despite the use of "tougher arrangements". Tom Roland of AllMusic praised Gayle's performance, notably on the tracks "Our Love Is on the Faultline" and "Deeper Than the Fire". Roland also criticized the production arrangements Bowen arranged for. True Love spawned three singles that all reached the number 1 spot on the Billboard Hot Country Singles]] chart: "Our Love Is on the Faultine", "Baby, What About You" and "'Til I Gain Control Again".

In 1983, Gayle's released her next album called Cage the Songbird. It was the first of Gayle's to be produced entirely by Jimmy Bowen. Cage the Songbird peaked at number 5 on the Top Country Albums chart and number 171 on the Billboard 200. Among its singles were the crossover hits "The Sound of Goodbye" and "Turning Away". Gayle had further hits from her next studio releases in 1985 and 1986. Among these were the number one hits, "Straight to the Heart" (1986) and "Cry" (1986). The latter was a song originally popularized by Johnnie Ray. In 1983, she would also record the theme song for the television series Masquerade. In 1984, she sang a duet with Hong Kong singer Danny Chan, titled "Tell Me What Can I Do", it was largely unknown due to lack of promotional budget.

Between 1985 and 1987, Gayle collaborated with country artist Gary Morris on a series of duets. The first being the single "Makin' Up for Lost Time". The song reached number 1 on the Billboard Hot Country Singles chart in 1986. "Makin' Up for Lost Time" was referred to as the "Lovers' Theme" on Dallas. It became an anthem for supercouple Bobby (Patrick Duffy) and Pam Ewing (Victoria Principal) on the CBS prime time soap opera. The pair also recorded the theme for the NBC soap opera Another World. Also titled "Another World", it peaked on the Billboard Hot Country Singles chart at number four in February 1986. Gayle would also guest star in the show as herself. The show would ultimately use Morris' and Gayle's recording as the show's opening theme for nine years. The duo would release their collaborative studio album in 1986 titled, What If We Fall in Love?. The album peaked at number 25 on the Billboard country albums list in September 1987. In 1988, Gayle released her final album of the decade entitled Nobody's Angel. The album produced two singles; the title track and the single "Tennessee Nights".

Also in 1987, Gayle opened a gift shop in Nashville called "Crystal's Fine Gifts and Jewelry". The store contained various gifts, such as jewelry and stones made by various European artisans. The shop also included various types of crystals. In a 1994 interview, Gayle commented on her business: "The little shop turned into a much larger shop and it takes a lot of work, as anyone in retail well knows. But we have a lot of fun with it." The shop officially closed in 2008.

=== 1990–present: Later career and recent years ===
In 1990, Gayle signed a new recording contract with Capitol Records and reunited with producer Allen Reynolds. The same year she released seventeenth studio album, Ain't Gonna Worry. Bill Carpenter of AllMusic gave the release 4 out of 5 stars, calling it "an excellent set of country pop". The album spawned several singles, beginning with "Just an Old Love". In its initial review Billboard gave it a positive response, praising the production style of Reynolds. Its third single, "Never Ending Song of Love", would become Gayle's last charting single to date, reaching number 72 on the Billboard Hot Country Singles chart. Her eighteenth studio album came in 1992 called Three Good Reasons. The album was produced by Buzz Stone. The album's lead single of the same name spawned a music video. Bill Kohlhaase of the Los Angeles Times gave the song and video a positive review, saying, "The video, alternating between scenes of Gayle and her swirling tresses with sparsely staged visions of a single mother and her two children, is the kind of heartfelt, yet assertive statement that Gayle has parlayed into major success in the past." AllMusic also gave the album 3 out of 5 stars.

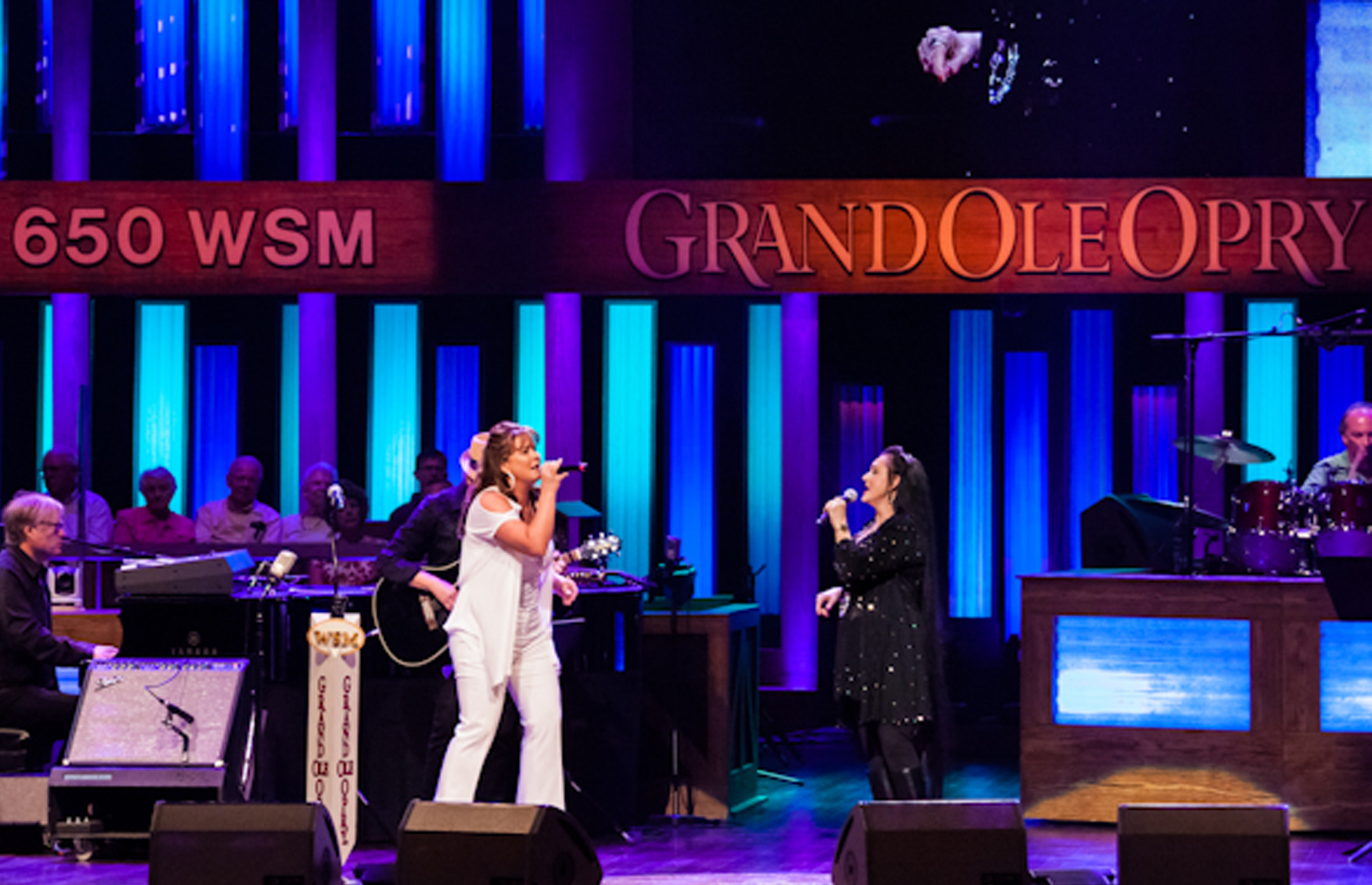
Crystal Gayle performing with Sherry Lynn at The Grand Ole Opry (2013)

As the 1990s progressed, Gayle recorded material for smaller labels and issuing specialty projects. Her first small label was the Branson Entertainment Group, where she released an album of re-recorded hits titled Best Always. In 1995, she signed with Intersound Records and recorded a pair of gospel studio albums. The first was 1995's Someday, which she co-produced with Bobby Wood. The album's first single included a music that was filmed in Greece. In a 1995 interview, she explained the message behind the title track, "There are songs in there that definitely you've lived. The title track is a song that I think a lot of people, the way it's written, definitely relate to." In 1997, her second gospel collection was released titled Joy & Inspiration.

At the dawn of the new millennium, Gayle expanded her musical interests. In 1999, she released an album of jazz and American Standards called Crystal Gayle Sings the Heart and Soul of Hoagy Carmichael. It was as a tribute to Hoagy Carmichael, whom Gayle worked with shortly before his death on Dec. 27, 1981. It album featured covers of songs he composed, including "Stardust" and "Georgia on My Mind". AllMusic's Thom Jurek gave the release 4 out of 5 stars in his review of Heart and Soul. Jurek called it, "a gorgeous set, one that reaffirms Gayle's artistry to be sure, but also one that offers the first really new hearing of Carmichael in at least a decade." Billboard Magazine praised the lead single, "Two Sleepy People" (a duet with Willie Nelson), calling it "sweet" and "playful". In 2000, she released a studio album of children's music titled In My Arms. In 2003, she released her second album of American standards called All My Tomorrows. Robert Daniels of Variety commented positively, saying, "Gayle's singing boasts directness and subtlety. There are no flashy or show-busy theatrics." AllMusic gave the release 4 out of 5 stars, calling Gayle's singing "stunning" and "capable." In January 2007, fugitive Christopher Daniel Gay escaped from custody at an Interstate 95 welcome center near Hardeeville, South Carolina, and made his way to Tennessee where he stole Gayle's tour bus. Gay was arrested the following day and the bus was returned to Gayle.

For several years, Gayle spent time recording her next studio release. She stated the album would consist of covers of country music classics and would be produced by her son, Chris Gatzimos. The project was originally titled Am I That Easy To Forget. In 2019, Gayle announced it would be re-titled You Don't Know Me: Classic Country. It was officially released in September 2019 via Southpaw Productions and The Orchard. You Don't Know Me became Gayle's first studio album to chart since 1988, reaching number 40 on the Billboard independent albums list. The album received positive reviews from critics. AllMusic critic Stephen Thomas Erlewine gave the release 3 of 5 stars. Erlewine noted that her upper register is "a little diminished", but she still "sounds amiable". Markos Papadatos of the Digital Journal gave it an "A" rating, commenting, "Overall, Crystal Gayle is sensational on her new album, You Don't Know Me, which is country as grits. Grab a bottle of wine and let this country queen lure you in with her timeless voice."

== Personal life ==
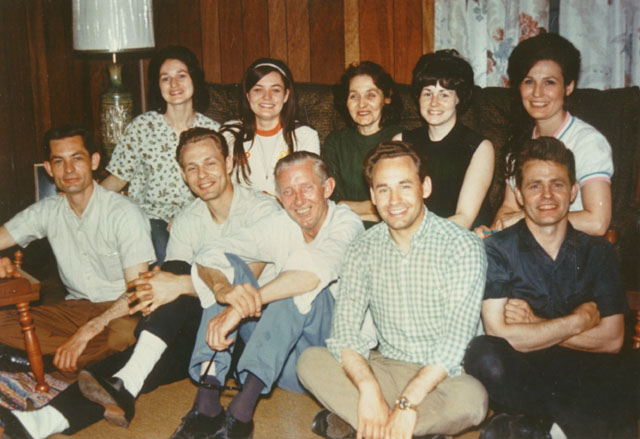
Family photograph of the Webb family. Starting from the left - Herman, Peggy Sue, Don, Crystal, Tommy Butcher, Clara, Jay Lee, Betty, Loretta, Junior

Gayle and her siblings claim Cherokee ancestry on their maternal and paternal lines. In October 2001, she was inducted into the Native American Music Awards Hall of Fame in honor of her self-identified Cherokee linkage.

Gayle has remained close to her seven siblings since childhood. Before signing a recording contract, she toured alongside her brother, Jay Lee Webb, in his band. Included on her 2019 studio album is a cover of Webb's song "You Never Were Mine". In an interview with Rolling Stone, Gayle wished she had "done it a long time ago" because they spent a lot of time touring together. Additionally, older sister Peggy Sue, has been an active member of Gayle's road show for several years. Peggy Sue performs background vocals on Gayle's show and does her own solo material too.

Gayle also remained close to her oldest sister Loretta Lynn. Music writers and journalists have claimed the pair had "sibling rivalry". In an interview with People, Lynn explained that such a rivalry did not exist: "People try to make it like we compete, but that's all in their minds...We fight a little bit, but that's just sisters. And we never fight over the music business." In a 2017 interview Gayle commented, "Of course, we're sisters. We can bicker... but we really didn't have a problem. You know, I look up to my sister...We both have flaws in different ways, but we're not gonna tell what they are, you know? But, I mean, we love each other."

Gayle has been married to husband Bill Gatzimos since 1971. The couple first dated in high school and while Gayle was signed to United Artists Records, Gatzimos attended law school at Vanderbilt University. Following law school, Gatzimos became Gayle's manager and has since been president of the couple's company, Gayle Enterprises. According to Gayle, their marriage has been successful because the couple pursues their "own interests" and lets each other "breathe". The couple have two children: a daughter, Catherine (born 1983) and a son, Christos (born 1986). Gayle's son is now a record producer and co-produced her 2019 album.

When Gayle's first child was born, she continued working frequently. In 2003 she said, "When I was onstage, I remember coming off stage and breast-feeding and then doing another show." When the couple had their second child, Gayle stayed home with the children. She also has two grandchildren named Elijah and Björn. Gayle spoke of her appreciation for grandchildren in a 2011 interview, "Holidays are so amazing with Elijah. We make cookies, which is great because I never really got much of a chance to do this with my own children. There's a pull when I go on the road when I'm not around him, and I want to be. He's just a bright spot that you want to see all the time. He loves life."

== Musical styles ==
Gayle's musical style is rooted in country, but is also in pop and folk music. Unlike her siblings (who mostly were raised in rural Kentucky), Gayle's formative years were spent in an urban environment. In this diverse atmosphere, Gayle was exposed to various styles of music. In 2003, she commented, "I've always enjoyed folk, pop, rock, gospel, country, everything..." As a child, she especially liked music by Lesley Gore, Brenda Lee and Patsy Cline. In her teen years, she developed a fondness for folk groups, most predominantly Peter, Paul and Mary.

Yet, Gayle also was attracted to the traditional country sound of her oldest sister Loretta Lynn. However it was Lynn that encouraged Gayle to develop a unique style. In an interview with the Chicago Tribune Gayle remarked: "But she (Lynn) said, `No, you gotta go the middle of the road and have a different sound.' And I'd never have made it if I had been straight-ahead country..." This perspective encouraged her to record different styles. In 2007, she commented that she likes to be called a singer: "I call myself a singer of songs. I love to sing, whether it's country, folk, pop or rock. I grew up singing all different styles, though definitely country is my roots." Gayle also said that her priority was to find quality material, "I've had great producers. Allen Reynolds is one of them, and he is just fantastic. I would always find great songs that other people wrote, and I wanted to put out really really good songs."

Music journalists and critics have also described Gayle as having a smooth vocal delivery, different from that of her sister's. AllMusic's Thom Jurek noted "her signature phrasing and sophisticated material" to be a factor. Stephen L. Betts of Rolling Stone explained that Gayle had "a polished persona and singing style tailor-made for country-pop crossover." Kurt Wolff of Country Music: The Rough Guide commented that she had a "sweet radio-friendly voice" that "made a picture-perfect pop-country star."

== Image ==
Gayle's image has garnered her significant media attention. Notably, she is known for her floor-length hair. As a child, Gayle's mother kept her hair short. She was inspired to grow her hair to her knees after seeing a woman with similar hair in Nashville. When her hair increased in length by the late 1970s, Gayle's fan club also significantly increased. By the early 1990s, her hair had reached floor's length. During that time, she considered significantly cutting her hair due to headaches and time spent maintaining it. However, she ultimately decided not to cut it. Gayle credits her daughter for discouraging a haircut. Gayle's daughter told her, "You can't cut your hair — you won't be Crystal Gayle." Gayle also stated that it is easier to have long straight hair, "I know some people think: 'Why does she keep it so long?' I'd probably love to try all the different styles, but I'm not a beautician. So, I keep it long. It's easy to wash and let it go." However, according to Gayle, she still continues seeing a hairstylist. Within a year, she cuts 9 to 12 inches of hair.

Gayle's physical appearance has also made her a sex symbol. Writers Robert K. Oermann and Mary A. Bufwack wrote in 2003, "Crystal Gayle will be forever recalled by music fans for the sexy toss of her head that sent waves of motion through her Godiva-like brunette tresses." Author Kurt Wolff described Gayle as having "knockout good looks". In 1983, People named her among the "50 Most Beautiful People in the World".

== Legacy ==
Gayle has been credited as one of the most successful and important country pop crossover artists. Gayle's music and career helped open doors for future female country pop artists, including Faith Hill, Shania Twain and Carrie Underwood. Writer Kevin John Coyne described her successes and contributions: "... she had accumulated an astonishing eighteen No.1 hits, two more than her older sister had under her belt, and fourth among all women in country music history, behind Dolly Parton, Reba McEntire and Tammy Wynette.

In recent years, Gayle has been given several awards and accolades for her accomplishments. In 2003, she was included by Country Music Television on their list of the "40 Greatest Women of Country Music". In 2008, she was inducted into the Kentucky Music Hall of Fame and Museum. In 2009, she received a star on the Hollywood Walk of Fame. She was joined by artist Tanya Tucker and her family for the ceremony. In 2016, she was presented with the "Cliffie Stone Pioneer Award" from the Academy of Country Music. Gayle commented in 2016, "It's nice to think maybe your music has influenced other artists who are out there."

In November 2016 almost 50 years after making her debut as a guest artist, Gayle was asked to become a member of the Grand Ole Opry by Carrie Underwood. The two performed "Don't It Make My Brown Eyes Blue" before Underwood announced the invitation. Gayle was officially inducted by Loretta Lynn in January 2017. In 2017, Gayle was included in Taste of Country's list of "Country Music's Most Powerful Women". In 2019, she was among a dozen performers chosen to open the Country Music Association Awards as part of recognizing the women of country music. In the show's opening, Gayle performed "Don't It Make My Brown Eyes Blue".

== Discography ==
Studio albums

- Crystal Gayle (1975)
- Somebody Loves You (1975)
- Crystal (1976)
- We Must Believe in Magic (1977)
- When I Dream (1978)
- We Should Be Together (1979)
- Miss the Mississippi (1979)
- These Days (1980)
- Hollywood, Tennessee (1981)
- True Love (1982)
- Cage the Songbird (1983)
- Nobody Wants to Be Alone (1985)
- What If We Fall in Love (with Gary Morris) (1986)
- Straight to the Heart (1986)
- A Crystal Christmas (1986)
- Nobody's Angel (1988)
- Ain't Gonna Worry (1990)
- Three Good Reasons (1992)
- Best Always (1993)
- Someday (1995)
- Joy & Inspiration (1997)
- Crystal Gayle Sings the Heart and Soul of Hoagy Carmichael (1999)
- In My Arms (2000)
- All My Tomorrows (2003)
- You Don't Know Me: Classic Country (2019)

== Filmography ==
Title	Year	Role	Notes	Ref.
Dean Martin's Christmas in California	1977	Herself	television special	
Bob Hope on the Road to China	1979	Herself	television special	
The Crystal Gayle Special	1979	Herself	television special	
Crystal	1980	Herself	television special	
Country Comes Home	1981	Herself	television special	
Second City Television	1983	Esther Blodgett		
Bob Hope's Happy Birthday Homecoming	1985	Herself	television special	
Another World	1987	Herself		
The Country Mouse and the City Mouse: A Christmas Tale	1993	Emily	voice only	

== See also ==
- List of country music performers
- List of Grand Ole Opry Members
