= List of songs written by Bob McDill =

This is a list of songs known to have been written by the award-winning American country songwriter Bob McDill.

== Songs ==
List of songs written by McDill with co-writers, original year released, and original artist with album (if relevant):

Title	Co-writer(s)	Year	Artist	Album
"Catfish John"	Allen Reynolds	1972	Bob McDill (Note: additional versions by: Johnny Russell, Alison Krauss w/The Nitty Gritty Dirt Band, The Grateful Dead)	Short Stories
"Come Early Morning"		1972	Bob McDill (Note: additional versions by: Don Williams, Waylon Jennings)	Short Stories
"God Love Her"		1972	Bob McDill	Short Stories
"Goodbye Jim Crow"	Allen Reynolds	1972	Bob McDill	Short Stories
"Help Yourselves to Each Other"	Allen Reynolds	1972	Bob McDill	Short Stories
"Song for Nan (What a Feeling)"		1972	Bob McDill	Short Stories
"Stainless Steel"		1972	Bob McDill	Short Stories
"Sugar Kane"	Allen Reynolds, Susan Taylor	1972	Bob McDill	Short Stories
"Rednecks, White Socks and Blue Ribbon Beer"	Wayland Holyfield	1973	Johnny Russell	Rednecks, White Socks and Blue Ribbon Beer
"The Door Is Always Open"	Dickey Lee	1973	Tennessee Pullybone (Note: additional versions by: Dave and Sugar)	
"Too Late to Turn Back Now"	Don Williams	1973	Don Williams	Don Williams Volume One
"I Recall a Gypsy Woman"	Allen Reynolds	1973	Don Williams (Note: additional versions by: B. J. Thomas, Waylon Jennings, Doc Watson)	Don Williams Volume One
"Amanda"		1973	Don Williams (Note: additional versions by: Waylon Jennings, Chris Stapleton, Conway Twitty)	Don Williams Volume One
"I Wish I Was in Nashville"		1974	Don Williams	Don Williams Volume Two
"I'm Not That Good at Goodbye"	Don Williams	1974	Lynn Anderson (Note: additional versions by: Lefty Frizzell, Merle Haggard, Tammy Wynette)	Smile For Me
"She's in Love with a Rodeo Man"		1974	Don Williams (Note: additional versions by: Johnny Russell)	Don Williams Volume Two
"Overnight Sensation"		1975	Mickey Gilley	Overnight Sensation
"I've Been Around Enough to Know"	Dickey Lee	1975	Jo-El Sonnier (Note: additional versions by: John Schneider)	
"Sweet Fever"	Dickey Lee	1975	Don Williams	You're My Best Friend
"Someone Like You"	Dickey Lee	1975	Don Williams (Note: additional versions by: Emmy Lou Harris)	You're My Best Friend
"(Turn Out the Light and) Love Me Tonight"		1975	Don Williams	You're My Best Friend
"Say It Again"		1976	Don Williams	Harmony
"She Never Knew Me"	Wayland Holyfield	1976	Don Williams	Harmony
“I’ll Do It All Over Again”	Wayland Holyfield	1976	Crystal Gayle	Crystal
“You Never Miss a Real Good Thing (‘Til He Says Goodbye)”		1976	Crystal Gayle	Crystal
"Right In the Palm of Your Hand"		1976	Crystal Gayle (Note: additional versions by: Mel McDaniel)	Crystal
"Closest Thing to You"		1976	Jerry Lee Lewis	Country Class
"I'll Need Someone to Hold Me (When I Cry)"	Wayland Holyfield	1977	Don Williams	Visions
“If You Think I’m Crazy Now (You Should Have Seen Me When I Was a Kid)”		1977	Bobby Bare	Me and McDill
“Hillbilly Hell”		1977	Bobby Bare	Me and McDill
“Don’t Think You’re Too Good for Country Music (Just Because You Can Rock)”	Wayland Holyfield	1977	Bobby Bare	Me and McDill
“‘Til I Get on My Feet”		1977	Bobby Bare	Me and McDill
“Don’t Turn Out the Light”		1977	Bobby Bare	Me and McDill
“Wilma Lou”		1977	Bobby Bare (Note: additional versions by: Larry Kingston)	Me and McDill
“Look Who I’m Cheating on Tonight”		1977	Bobby Bare	Me and McDill
“You Made a Believer Out of Me”		1977	Bobby Bare	Me and McDill
“The Woman in Every Man’s Life”		1977	Bobby Bare	Me and McDill
“Can’t Seem to Get Nowhere”		1977	Bobby Bare	Me and McDill
“Tired of the Road Joe”		1977	Bobby Bare	Me and McDill
"Louisiana Saturday Night"		1977	Don Williams	Country Boy
"Sneakin' Around"		1977	Don Williams	Country Boy
"Rake and Ramblin' Man"		1977	Don Williams	Country Boy
"Falling In Love"	Wayland Holyfield	1977	Don Williams (Note: additional versions by: Nicolette Larson)	Country Boy
"As Long as We Live"		1977	Jerry Lee Lewis	Country Memories
"What's So Good About Goodbye"		1977	Jerry Lee Lewis	Country Memories
"We Must Believe In Magic"	Allen Reynolds	1977	Crystal Gayle	We Must Believe In Magic
"Give It To Me"	Wayland Holyfield	1978	Don Williams	Expressions
"It Must Be Love"		1978	Don Williams (Note: additional versions by: Alan Jackson)	Expressions
"We Believe In Happy Endings"		1978	Johnny Rodriguez (Note: additional versions by: Earl Thomas Connelly and Emmy Lou Harris)	Just For You
"Too Good To Throw Away"		1978	Crystal Gayle	When I Dream
"Nobody Likes Sad Songs"	Wayland Holyfield	1979	Ronnie Milsap	Images
"It Only Rains On Me"		1979	Don Williams	Portrait
"We've Never Tried It With Each Other"		1979	Don Williams	Portrait
"Good Ole' Boys Like Me"		1979	Don Williams (Note: additional versions by: Garth Brooks)	Portrait
"Song of the South"		1980	Bobby Bare (Note: additional versions by: Alabama, Tom T Hall & Lester Flatt)	Drunk and Crazy
"Louisiana Saturday Night"		1980	Mel McDaniel	I'm Countryfied
"Why Don't You Spend the Night"		1980	Ronnie Milsap	Milsap Magic
"Catch Me If You Can"		1980	Brendan Shine	Non-album single
"Think I'm in Love Again"	Paul Anka	1981	Paul Anka and Gloria Estefan (Note: additional versions by: Paul Anka)	Duets
"Shot Full of Love"		1981	Juice Newton (Note: additional versions by: Nitty Gritty Dirt Band, Billy Ray Cyrus)	Juice
"Somebody's Always Saying Goodbye"		1981	Anne Murray	The Hottest Night of the Year
"Falling Again"		1981	Don Williams	I Believe In You
"If Hollywood Don't Need You (Honey I Still Do)"		1982	Don Williams	Listen to the Radio
"I'm Dancing as Fast as I Can"		1982	Juice Newton (Note: additional versions by: Gus Hardin)	Quiet Lies
"Falling in Love"	Wayland Holyfield	1982	Juice Newton	Quiet Lies
"Runaway Hearts"	Hunter Moore	1983	Juice Newton	Dirty Looks
"I Call It Love"		1983	Mel McDaniel	Mel McDaniel with Oklahoma Wind
"You Turn Me On (Like a Radio)"	Jim Weatherly	1984	Ed Bruce	Homecoming
"Too Good to Stop Now"	Rory Bourke	1984	Mickey Gilley	Too Good to Stop Now
"All Tangled Up In Love"	Jim Weatherly	1984	Gus Hardin and Earl Thomas Conley	Wall of Tears
"I May Be Used (But Baby I Ain't Used Up)"		1984	Waylon Jennings	Waylon and Company
"Baby's Got Her Blue Jeans On"		1984	Mel McDaniel	Let It Roll
"Everything That Glitters (Is Not Gold)"	Dan Seals	1984	Dan Seals	Won't Be Blue Anymore
"My Baby's Got Good Timing"	Dan Seals	1984	Dan Seals	San Antone
"I Never Made Love (Till I Made It With You)"		1985	Mac Davis	Till I Made It with You
"It's Time For Love"		1985	Don Williams	Cafe Carolina
Don't Close Your Eyes		1988	Keith Whitley (Note: additional versions by: Garth Brooks)	Don't Close Your Eyes
"Another Place, Another Time"	Paul Harrison	1988	Don Williams	Traces
"Big Wheels in the Moonlight"	Dan Seals	1988	Dan Seals	Rage On
"They Rage On"	Dan Seals	1988	Dan Seals	Rage On
"What She Is (is a Woman in Love)"	Paul Harrison	1988	Earl Thomas Conley	The Heart of It All
"Gone Country"		1994	Alan Jackson	Who I Am
"I've Been Loved By the Best"	Paul Harrison	1989	Don Williams	One Good Well
"In a Different Light"	Dickey Lee, Buckey Jones	1991	Doug Stone	Doug Stone
"Lord Have Mercy On a Country Boy"		1991	Don Williams (Note: additional versions by: Josh Turner)	True Love
"Coyotes"		1993	Don Edwards	Goin' Back to Texas
"She Don't Know She's Beautiful"	Paul Harrison	1993	Sammy Kershaw	Haunted Heart
"Standing Knee Deep in a River (Dying of Thirst)"	Dickey Lee, Buckey Jones	1993	Kathy Mattea (Note: additional versions by: Joe Cocker)	Lonesome Standard Time
"On the Road"		1993	Lee Roy Parnell	On the Road
"Why Didn't I Think of That"	Paul Harrison	1993	Doug Stone (Note: additional versions by: Marshall Tucker Band)	From the Heart
"Paradise"	Roger Murrah	1995	John Anderson	Paradise
"I'm Living Up to Her Low Expectations"	Tommy Rocco	1995	Daryle Singletary	Daryle Singletary
"Somebody Slap Me"	Roger Murrah	1997	John Anderson	Takin' the Country Back
"All the Good Ones Are Gone"	Dean Dillon	1997	Pam Tillis	Pam Tillis Greatest Hits
"Honky Tonk America"		1998	Sammy Kershaw	Labor of Love
