= Short Stories (Bob McDill album) =

Studio album by Bob McDill
- Released: 1972
- Studio: Jack Clement Recording (Nashville, Tennessee)
- Genre: Country
- Label: JMI Records
- Producer: Allen Reynolds

Singles from Short Stories
- 1. "Song For Nan" Released: 1972; 2. "Stainless Steel" Released: 1972

Short Stories is the first LP album by the award-winning American songwriter Bob McDill, released in 1972 by J-M-I Records. It is notable for being the only known album recorded by the successful country music writer. It is also notable as being the first full-length album released on the short lived J-M-I Records label. Several of the songs from the album, including "Catfish John" and "Come Early Morning" would go on to have chart success covered by other artists, including Don Williams and Johnny Russell.

== Background ==
Bob McDill came to initial professional recognition in 1967 with "The Happy Man", recorded by Perry Como. Songwriting duo Dickey Lee and Allen Reynolds were credited with helping to land the gig, and McDill would remain professionally involved with them throughout the 1970s. Reynolds went to work for Jack Clement as vice president of his new record label, J-M-I, and Reynolds brought along McDill to be a writer for the publishing division, Jack Music, Inc. Reynolds would also go on to produce and co-write much of the material on Short Stories with McDill.

The first single released from the album in 1972 was "Song for Nan (What a Feeling)", a song dedicated to McDill's wife.

The album was the first LP released by J-M-I in 1972, which was a small record label with independent distribution agreements. J-M-I experienced noted distribution issues during its existence, and the album did not have an initial wide release. While the album wasn't a chart success, McDill's career as a songwriter quickly became more lucrative, as the songs from Short Stories would soon go on to be released successfully by other artists.

Of his short lived career as recording musician, McDill said:

“I didn’t want it that badly. Making records is fun but I didn’t want to be a star.”

"Catfish John" co-written with Reynolds, was recorded by American country music artist Johnny Russell. It was released November 1972 as the fourth single from the album, "Catfish John"/"Chained", and became a number thirteen country chart hit. The song is credited with propelling Bob McDill into the front ranks of country songwriters.

Don Williams would release "Come Early Morning" (with the B-Side "Amanda" - another noted McDill composition) as a single from his debut album, Don Williams Volume One, in 1973, and it would be a number twelve country chart hit. "Come Early Morning" is argued to have one of the first country music videos, produced by Jack Clement. "Help Yourselves To Each Other" would also be included on Williams' 1975 hit album You're My Best Friend.

J-M-I label-mate Susan Taylor (known professionally as Taylor Pie and formerly of the Pozo Seco Singers) collaborated with Reynolds and McDill on the Side B opener "Sugar Kane." Taylor's solo debut album Finally Getting Home was also released by J-M-I the same year as McDill's, and she recorded his song "You Won't Take Me In" for her album.

== Track listing ==
Track listing from the original LP.

Side A

1. "Song for Nan (What a Feeling)" (Bob McDill) 3:09
2. "Weather Report" (Ken Lauber) 3:15
3. "Stainless Steel" (Allen Reynolds, Bob McDill) 3:11
4. "I've Been Thinking of You Lately" (Gove Scrivenor) 2:11
5. "Catfish John" (Allen Reynolds, Bob McDill) 3:21

Side B

1. "Sugar Kane" (Allen Reynolds, Bob McDill, Susan Taylor) 4:14
2. "Come Early Morning" (Bob McDill) 3:29
3. "Goodbye Jim Crow" (Allen Reynolds, Bob McDill) 3:02
4. "God Love Her" (Bob McDill) 2:17
5. "Help Yourselves to Each Other" (Allen Reynolds, Bob McDill) 2:56

== Personnel ==
- Bob McDill - acoustic guitar, banjo, drums, bottleneck guitar
- Tommy McClure - bass
- Sammy Creason - drums, congas, triangle
- Charlie Freeman - electric guitar, acoustic guitar
- Allen Reynolds - tenor guitar, harmonica, marimba
- Danny Flowers - harmonica, electric guitar
- Susan Taylor - mandolin
- Mike Utley - organ, piano, vibraphone
- Ken Lauber - piano, organ, bass
- Garth Fundis - trombone

== Production ==
- Produced by Allen Reynolds
- Engineer and mixed by Ronnie Dean
- Photography by John Donegan
- Graphics – Pinwheel Studios
