= List of songs written by Don Williams =

This is a list of songs known to have been written by award-winning American singer-songwriter Don Williams.

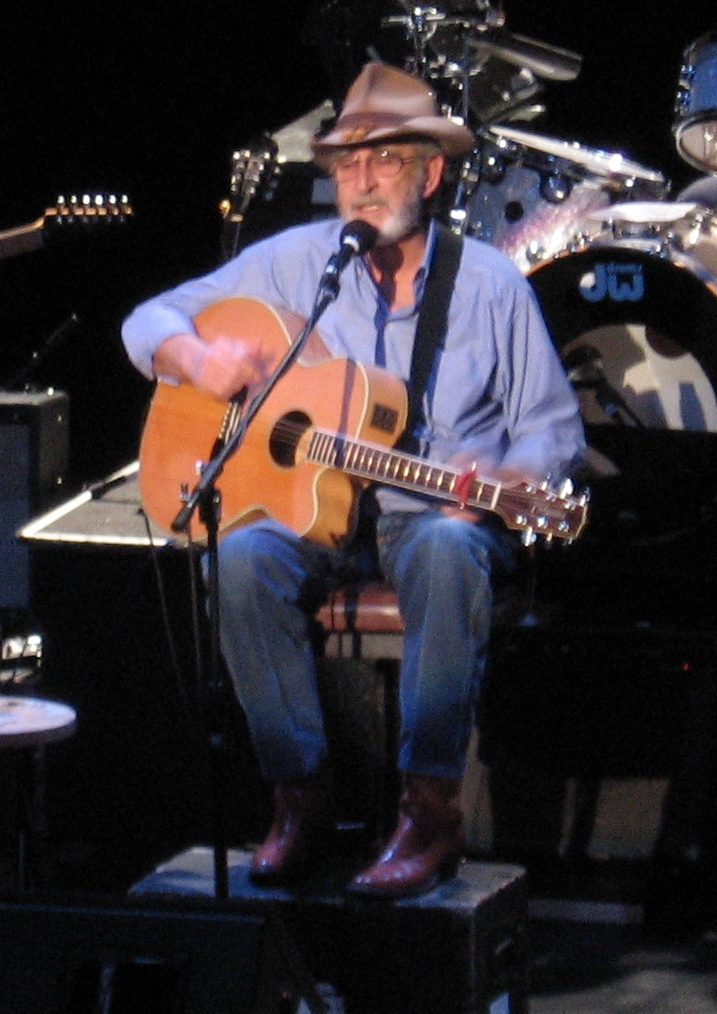
Don Williams wrote seven of his top twenty hits, two of which were number one hits

== Songs ==
List of songs written by Williams in chronological order, with first known release and year

Title	Co-writer(s)	Release	Year	US Country
"Too Late to Turn Back Now"	Allen Reynolds	Don Williams Volume One	1973	
"The Shelter of Your Eyes"		Don Williams Volume One	1973	14
"I Recall a Gypsy Woman"	Reynolds, Bob McDill	Don Williams Volume One	1973	13
"How Much Time Does It Take"		Don Williams Volume One	1973	
"My Woman's Love"		Don Williams Volume One	1973	
"Don't You Believe"		Don Williams Volume One	1973	
"Your Sweet Love"		Don Williams Volume Two	1974	
"Atta Way to Go"		Don Williams Volume Two	1974	13
"Oh Misery"		Don Williams Volume Two	1974	
"Down the Road I Go"		Don Williams Volume Two	1974	
"Fly Away"		Don Williams Vol. III	1974	
"Goodbye Really Isn't Good at All"		Don Williams Vol. III	1974	
"Such a Lovely Lady"		Don Williams Vol. III	1974	
"Why Lord Goodbye"		Don Williams Vol. III	1974	
"Where Are You"		You're My Best Friend	1975	
"You're the Only One"		You're My Best Friend	1975	
"Reason to Be"	Kerry Livgren	You're My Best Friend	1975	
"'Til the Rivers All Run Dry"	Wayland Holyfield	Harmony	1976	1
"You Keep Coming 'Round"		Harmony	1976	
"Don't You Think It's Time"		Harmony	1976	
"I Don't Want the Money"		Harmony	1976	
"Maybe I Just Don't Know"		Harmony	1976	
"Ramblin' (instrumental)"		Harmony	1976	
"I'll Forgive But I'll Never Forget"		Visions	1977	
"In the Mornin'"		Visions	1977	
"Missing You, Missing Me"	Allen Reynolds	Visions	1977	
"We Can Sing"		Visions	1977	
"Overlookin' and Underthinkin'"	Joe Allen, Deoin Elijah Lay	Country Boy	1977	
"I've Got a Winner in You"	Wayland Holyfield	Country Boy	1977	7
"It's Gotta Be Magic"		Country Boy	1977	
"Lay Down Beside Me"		Expressions	1978	3
"We're All the Way"		Portrait	1979	
"You Get to Me"		Portrait	1979	
"Love Me Over Again"		Portrait	1979	1
"If She Just Helps Me Get Me Get Over You"	Allen Reynolds	Listen to the Radio	1982	
"Leaving"		Cafe Carolina	1984	
"True Blue Hearts"		Cafe Carolina	1984	
"The Light in Your Eyes"		New Moves	1986	
"Cryin' Eyes"		One Good Well	1989	
"We're All the Way"		One Good Well	1989	
