= Don Williams Volume Two =

Studio album by Don Williams
- Released: January 1974
- Studio: Jack's Tracks (Nashville, Tennessee); Jack Clement Recording (Nashville, Tennessee)
- Genre: Country
- Label: JMI
- Producer: Allen Reynolds

Don Williams chronology
Don Williams Volume One (1973)	Don Williams Volume Two (1974)	Don Williams Vol. III (1974)

Singles from Don Williams Volume Two
- 1. "Atta Way to Go" Released: 1973; 2. "We Should Be Together" Released: 1974; 3. "Down the Road I Go" Released: 1974

Professional ratings
Review scores
Source	Rating
AllMusic	4.5/5 stars

Don Williams Volume Two is the second studio album by American country music singer and songwriter Don Williams. Released in January of 1974 on the JMI Records label, the album reached number 13 on the US Country Albums Chart. "Atta Way to Go" was released in 1973 as a single preceding the album, and "We Should Be Together" and "Down the Road I Go" were released as singles in 1974.

== Background ==
Williams was no stranger to the country music scene, having been a member of the Texas band Pozo-Seco Singers from 1964 to 1970. He left the music industry briefly, but returned in 1973 with his solo debut, Don Williams Volume One. Williams had signed with JMI records initially as a songwriter, but later at the encouragement of its founder, Jack Clement, recorded a full-length album produced by songwriter Allen Reynolds. It was a strong debut, reaching number five on the 1973 Country Albums chart, and it had two top-20 country singles.

Six months after the release of his debut album, the formula for success was repeated for Don Williams Volume Two, including producer Allen Reynolds, and many of the same A-Team Nashville studio musicians, notably steel guitarist Lloyd Green, fiddle player Buddy Spicher, and drummer Kenny Malone.

== Legacy ==
This was Williams' final recording with JMI records, which was sold to ABC-DOT Records shortly after the release of the album.

Allen Reynolds went on to produce and write many successful country songs, including many of Crystal Gayle's biggest hits from the 1970s and 1980s. The song "We Should Be Together", written by Reynolds, went on to be the title track on Gayle's 1979 album.

== Track listing ==
From the original JMI Records release:

No.	Title	Writer(s)	Length
1.	"Wish I Was in Nashville"	Bob McDill	2:25
2.	"Your Sweet Love"	Don Williams	2:39
3.	"She's in Love with a Rodeo Man"	McDill	3:10
4.	"Atta Way to Go"	Williams	2:47
5.	"We Should Be Together"	Allen Reynolds	3:02
6.	"Loving You So Long"	Reynolds	2:47
7.	"Oh Misery"	Williams	3:40
8.	"Millers Cave"	Jack Clement	2:37
9.	"I Don't Think About Her No More"	Mickey Newbury	3:50
10.	"Down the Road I Go"	Williams	3:07

== Musicians ==
From the original album liner notes:

- Don Williams - lead vocals, guitar
- The Joyful Noise - "gentle voices" backing vocals
- Bobby Thompson - banjo
- Joe Allen - bass guitar
- Lloyd Green - dobro, steel guitar
- Kenny Malone - drums
- Buddy Spicher, Johnny Gimble, Lisa Silver - fiddle
- Bobby Thompson, Chip Young, Jimmy Colvard - guitar
- Danny Flowers - harpoonist harmonica
- Chuck Cochran - keyboards
- Johnny Gimble - mandolin
- Jimmy Colvard - "Boogie beats"

Production

- Producer – Allen Reynolds
- Engineer – Curt Allen, Garth Fundis, Ronnie Dean
- Arranged – Charles Cochran
- Photography – John Donegan
- Lighting director – Jack Clement
