= Atta Way to Go =

"Atta Way To Go"

Single by Don Williams

from the album Don Williams Volume Two
- B-side: "I Recall a Gypsy Woman"
- Released: November 17, 1973
- Recorded: 1973
- Studio: Jack Clements Studio, Nashville, Tennessee
- Genre: Country
- Length: 2:46
- Label: JMI
- Songwriter(s): Don Williams
- Producer(s): Allen Reynolds

Don Williams singles chronology
"Come Early Morning" (1973)	"Atta Way To Go" (1973)	"We Should Be Together" (1974)

"Atta Way to Go" is a song written and recorded by American country music singer Don Williams. It was released in November 1973 as the first single from the album Don Williams Volume Two. The single would reach number thirteen on the Billboard hot country chart. The track was produced by Allen Reynolds, who also produced Williams' previous top 20 chart hits.

A song from Don Williams Volume One called "I Recall a Gypsy Woman", written by Williams, along with Allen Reynolds and Bob McDill, was the B-side for the single.

Many of Williams' best-known songs were written by other composers (including Bob McDill, Allen Reynolds, and Al Turney), and this single release was notable in that it was one of the few of Williams' self-penned tunes to be a charting single. "Atta Way to Go" is considered one of the early hits that helped establish the Don Williams sound that made him a success throughout the 1970s.

== Chart performance ==
Chart (1973)	Peak position
US Hot Country Songs (Billboard)	13
