= We Should Be Together =

We Should Be Together may refer to:

- We Should Be Together (album), a 1979 album by Crystal Gayle
- We Should Be Together (Cliff Richard song)
- We Should Be Together (Don Williams song)
- We Should Be Together, a song by Pia Mia
