= Your Old Cold Shoulder =

1979 single by Crystal Gayle

Single by Crystal Gayle

from the album We Should Be Together
- Released: November 1979
- Recorded: October 13, 1977; Nashville, Tennessee, U.S.
- Studio: Jack's Tracks (Nashville, Tennessee)
- Genre: Country; country pop
- Length: 2:17
- Label: United Artists
- Songwriter: Richard Leigh
- Producer: Allen Reynolds

Crystal Gayle singles chronology
"Half The Way" (1979)	"Your Old Cold Shoulder" (1979)	"It's Like We Never Said Goodbye" (1980)

"Your Old Cold Shoulder" is a song written by Richard Leigh that was originally performed by American country music artist Crystal Gayle. It was released in November of 1979, and was her last single released to radio from the United Artists record label. It was the second single released from the album, We Should Be Together.

== Background and reception ==
"Your Old Cold Shoulder" was originally recorded on October 13, 1976 at Jack's Tracks, a studio located in Nashville, Tennessee. Other tracks recorded at the session were the hits "When I Dream" and "Ready for the Times to Get Better". The session was produced by Allen Reynolds.

"Your Old Cold Shoulder" was officially released in November 1979 and it peaked at number five on the Billboard Hot Country Singles chart for the week ending Saturday, February 9, 1980. The song also peaked at number five on the Canadian RPM Country Songs chart.

== Weekly charts ==
Chart (1979–1980)	Peak position
Canada Country Songs (RPM)	5
US Hot Country Singles (Billboard)	5
