= Greatest Hits (Waylon Jennings album) =

Greatest hits album by Waylon Jennings
- Released: April 1979
- Genres: Country; outlaw country
- Label: RCA
- Producers: Waylon Jennings; Ritchie Albright; Chet Atkins; Jack Clement; Tompall Glaser; Ken Mansfield; Chips Moman; Ray Pennington

Waylon Jennings chronology
I've Always Been Crazy (1978)	Greatest Hits (1979)	What Goes Around Comes Around (1979)

Professional ratings
Review scores
Source	Rating
Allmusic	5/5 stars
Rolling Stone	(Not Rated)

Greatest Hits is the seventh compilation album by American country music artist Waylon Jennings, released in 1979 by RCA Records.

== Background ==
The LP mostly documents Jennings' outlaw country years for RCA Records during the 1970s and includes several of his most well-known signature songs, the most recent of which had been the title track of the album I've Always Been Crazy, issued the year before. "Only Daddy That'll Walk The Line", released in 1968, is the oldest track. Excluding the Mackintosh & T.J. soundtrack album and the White Mansions concept album, Greatest Hits became Jennings' eighth consecutive release to reach No. 1 on the charts; it was also one of his last chart-topping records, with What Goes Around Comes Around, released that same year, peaking at No. 2.

"Amanda" was originally issued on Jennings' 1974 album The Ramblin' Man, but had not been released as a single at that time. More than 4½ years later, new overdubs were added to the original track and the song was included on this greatest hits album. "Amanda" was issued as a single simultaneously with the album in April, 1979 and the song soon became one of the biggest country hits of the year.

The album has been 5× Platinum certified by the Recording Industry Association of America (RIAA) and 3× Platinum by Music Canada. RCA first issued the original 11-track album on compact disc in 1984; in 1989, RCA reissued the album on CD and cassette with the songs resequenced and omitting two tracks ("Ladies Love Outlaws" and "Only Daddy That'll Walk The Line"). This is the version of the CD currently available.

== Track listing ==
=== 1979 release ===
1. "Lonesome, On'ry and Mean" (Young) – 3:38
  From Lonesome, On'ry and Mean (1973)
2. "Ladies Love Outlaws" (Clayton) – 2:32
  From Ladies Love Outlaws (1972)
3. "I've Always Been Crazy" (Jennings) – 4:11
  From I've Always Been Crazy (1978)
4. "I'm a Ramblin' Man" (Ray Pennington) – 2:46
  From The Ramblin' Man (1974)
5. "Only Daddy That'll Walk The Line" (Bryant) – 2:20
  From Only the Greatest (1968)
6. "Amanda" (McDill) – 2:56
  New overdub of a song that had appeared on The Ramblin' Man (1974)
7. "Honky Tonk Heroes" (Billy Joe Shaver) – 3:27
  From Honky Tonk Heroes (1973)
8. "Mammas Don't Let Your Babies Grow Up to Be Cowboys" (Bruce, Bruce) – 2:32
  - With Willie Nelson
  From Waylon and Willie (1978)
9. "Good Hearted Woman" (Jennings, Nelson) – 2:59
  - With Willie Nelson
  From Wanted! The Outlaws (1976)
10. "Luckenbach, Texas (Back to the Basics of Love)" (Emmons, Moman) – 3:19
  From Ol' Waylon (1977)
11. "Are You Sure Hank Done It This Way" (Jennings) – 2:55
  From Dreaming My Dreams (1975)

=== 1989 release ===
1. "Lonesome, On'ry and Mean" (Young) – 3:38
2. "I've Always Been Crazy" (Jennings) – 4:11
3. "Honky Tonk Heroes" (Shaver) – 3:27
4. "Luckenbach, Texas (Back to the Basics of Love)" (Emmons, Moman) – 3:19
5. "I'm a Ramblin' Man" (Pennington) – 2:46
6. "Amanda" (McDill) – 2:56
7. "Mamas Don't Let Your Babies Grow up to Be Cowboys" (Bruce, Bruce) – 2:32 (with Willie Nelson)
8. "A Good Hearted Woman" (Jennings, Nelson) – 2:59
9. "Are You Sure Hank Done It This Way" (Jennings) – 2:55

== Charts ==
=== Weekly charts ===
Chart (1979)	Peak position
Australian Albums (Kent Music Report)	28
Canadian Albums (RPM)	20
Canadian Country Albums (RPM)	1
New Zealand Albums (RMNZ)	9
US Billboard 200	28
US Top Country Albums (Billboard)	1

=== Year-end charts ===
Chart (1979)	Position
US Billboard 200	80
US Top Country Albums (Billboard)	2
Chart (1980)	Position
US Billboard 200	25
US Top Country Albums (Billboard)	2
Chart (1981)	Position
US Billboard 200	73
US Top Country Albums (Billboard)	7
Chart (1982)	Position
US Top Country Albums (Billboard)	38

== Certifications ==
Region	Certification	Certified units/sales
Canada (Music Canada)	3× Platinum	300,000^{^}
United States (RIAA)	5× Platinum	5,000,000^{^}
^{^} Shipments figures based on certification alone.
