= The Shelter of Your Eyes =

Single by Don Williams

from the album Don Williams Volume One
- B-side: "Playin' Around"
- Released: December 16, 1972
- Recorded: 1972
- Studio: Jack Clement's Studio, Nashville, Tennessee
- Genre: Country
- Length: 2:55
- Label: JMI
- Songwriter(s): Don Williams
- Producer(s): Allen Reynolds

Don Williams singles chronology
| "The Shelter of Your Eyes" (1972) | "Come Early Morning" (1973) |

"The Shelter of Your Eyes" is a song written and recorded by American country music artist Don Williams. It was released in December 1972 as his debut single and the first from his album Don Williams Volume One. The single release was the first commercial single released by 1970s country star, and was a number-14 country chart hit.

Williams was signed to Jack Clements' J-M-I Records and Jack Music, Inc in 1972 by Allen Reynolds, and Reynolds went on to produce Williams' entire debut album.

Many of Williams' best-known songs were written by other composers (including Bob McDill, Allen Reynolds, and Al Turney), and this single release was notable in that it was one of the few of Williams' self-penned tunes to be a charting single.

The song was also recorded by singer Lobo for his 1975 album Just a Singer on Big Tree Records, which was distributed by Atlantic Records.

The B-side "Playin' Around" was re-released on several Don Williams compilation albums throughout the 2000s.

== Cover versions ==
The song was covered by Charley Pride on his 1973 album Sweet Country.

== Chart performance ==
| Chart (1972–1973) | Peak Position |
|---|---|
| US Hot Country Songs (Billboard) | 14 |
