= When I Dream (song) =

Single by Crystal Gayle

from the album When I Dream
- B-side: "Hello I Love You"
- Released: April 14, 1979
- Recorded: October 5, 1977
- Studio: Jack's Tracks (Nashville, Tennessee)
- Genre: Country
- Length: 3:28
- Label: United Artists
- Songwriter(s): Sandy Mason Theoret
- Producer(s): Allen Reynolds

Crystal Gayle singles chronology
"Why Have You Left the One You Left Me For" (1978)	"When I Dream" (1979)	"Your Kisses Will" (1979)

"When I Dream" is a song written by Sandy Mason Theoret, and recorded by American country music artist Crystal Gayle. It was released in April 1979 as the third and final single and title track from the June 1978 album When I Dream. The song was originally released on her 1975 eponymous debut album and was re-recorded for her 1978 album.

== Chart performance ==
The song reached number 3 on the Billboard Hot Country Singles & Tracks chart.

=== Weekly charts ===
Chart (1979)	Peak position
US Hot Country Songs (Billboard)	3
US Billboard Hot 100	84
US Adult Contemporary (Billboard)	20
Canadian RPM Country Tracks	3

=== Year-end charts ===
Chart (1979)	Position
US Hot Country Songs (Billboard)	34

== Other versions ==
- The song was later recorded by Willie Nelson on his 1986 album Partners.
