= Crystal Gayle (album) =

Studio album by Crystal Gayle
- Released: February 7, 1975
- Studio: Jack Clement Recording (Nashville, Tennessee)
- Genre: Country
- Length: 26:21
- Label: United Artists
- Producer: Allen Reynolds

Crystal Gayle chronology
Crystal Gayle (1975)	Somebody Loves You (1975)

Singles from Crystal Gayle
- 1. "Wrong Road Again" Released: September 1974; 2. "Beyond You" Released: February 1975; 3. "This Is My Year for Mexico" Released: June 1975

Professional ratings
Review scores
Source	Rating
Allmusic	2.5/5 stars

Crystal Gayle is the debut studio album by American country music artist Crystal Gayle, although she had previously recorded material which was not released until later. It was released on February 7, 1975. The album peaked at #25 on the Billboard Country Albums chart, and included three charting Hot Country Singles: "Wrong Road Again" at #6, "Beyond You" at #27, and "This Is My Year for Mexico" at #21.

Also included is her first rendition of "When I Dream," which would become a big hit three years later on the release of her 1978 album When I Dream. The recording of "Beyond You" is the same one that reappears on 1979's We Should Be Together. The song was later covered by Ava Barber, who included a version on her 1976 album Country as Grits. It was composed by Gayle and her then husband and manager, Bill Gatzimos.

== Track listing ==
No.	Title	Writer(s)	Length
1.	"Wrong Road Again"	Allen Reynolds	2:15
2.	"A Woman's Heart (Is a Handy Place to Be)"	Marshall Chapman, Cort Casady	2:32
3.	"Gonna Lay Me Down Beside My Memories"	Ray Griff	2:23
4.	"When I Dream"	Sandy Mason Theoret	2:49
5.	"You"	Dolly Parton	2:23
6.	"Loving You So Long Now"	Reynolds	2:56
7.	"Beyond You"	Bill Gatzimos, Crystal Gayle	2:36
8.	"Hands"	Theoret, Bill Backer	2:58
9.	"Counterfeit Love (I Know You've Got It)"	Paul Craft	2:44
10.	"This Is My Year for Mexico"	Vince Matthews	2:45

== Personnel ==
- Crystal Gayle – vocals
- Jimmy Colvard – electric and rhythm guitar
- Allen Reynolds – rhythm guitar, backing vocals
- Lloyd Green – steel guitar, dobro
- Buddy Spicher – fiddle
- Joe Allen – bass
- Charles Cochrane – keyboards, string arrangements
- Bobby Wood – keyboards
- Jimmy Isbell, Kenny Malone – drums, percussion
- Garth Fundis – baritone horn, backing vocals, engineer

Technical

- Lloyd Ziff – art direction
- Ria Lewerke – design
- Doug Metzler – photography
