= Half the Way =

- Side A of US single

Single by Crystal Gayle

from the album Miss the Mississippi
- B-side: "Room for One More"
- Released: September 1979
- Recorded: 1978
- Genre: Country pop, adult contemporary
- Length: 4:03 (Album version) 3:32 (Single version)
- Label: Columbia
- Songwriters: Ralph Murphy, Bobby Wood
- Producer: Allen Reynolds

Crystal Gayle singles chronology
"Your Kisses Will" (1979)	"Half the Way" (1979)	"Your Old Cold Shoulder" (1979)

"Half the Way" is a song written by Ralph Murphy and Bobby Wood, and recorded by American country music artist Crystal Gayle. It was released in September 1979 as the first single from the album Miss the Mississippi.

After achieving major Country crossover success in 1977 with "Don't It Make My Brown Eyes Blue.", followed by a Top 20 Pop hit and No. 1 Country hit the next year ("Talking In Your Sleep"), Gayle attempted this new crossover piece of music.

After signing with Columbia Records in early 1979, Gayle immediately started recording for them. "Half the Way" was the first song recorded under her new record label. The song's up-tempo, soft rock production made it reach Billboard Magazine's Hot 100 chart; peaking at number fifteen for the week ending Saturday, December 15, 1979. One month prior, the song climbed to number two on the Billboard Hot Country Singles chart for the week ending Saturday, November 3, 1979. It also reached number nine on the Billboard Adult Contemporary chart. Following "Half the Way"'s success, Gayle never achieved another solo Top 40 Pop hit. Her singles did continue to chart on Billboard's Hot Country Singles and A.C. charts, however.

== Chart performance ==
Chart (1979–1980)	Peak position
Canada RPM Country Tracks	1
Canadian RPM Adult Contemporary Tracks	2
Canadian RPM Top Singles	56
South Africa (Springbok)	4
US Hot Country Songs (Billboard)	2
US Adult Contemporary (Billboard)	9
US Billboard Hot 100	15
