= Come Early Morning (song) =

Single by Don Williams

from the album Don Williams Volume One
- B-side: "Amanda"
- Released: April 1973
- Recorded: 1973
- Studio: Jack Clements Studio, Nashville, Tennessee
- Genre: Country
- Length: 3:08
- Label: JMI
- Songwriter(s): Bob McDill
- Producer(s): Allen Reynolds

Don Williams singles chronology
"The Shelter Of Your Eyes" (1973)	"Come Early Morning" (1973)	"Atta Way to Go" (1974)

"Come Early Morning" is a song written by Bob McDill, which was initially recorded by McDill for his JMI Records album Short Stories, released in 1972. It was subsequently recorded by American country music artist Don Williams. It was released in April 1973 as the second single from his debut album Don Williams Volume One, and it became a number-12 country chart hit.

The B-Side to the single was the song "Amanda", also written by Bob McDill.

For Williams' single version of "Come Early Morning", Jack Clement produced a promotional film made that is arguably one of the first country music videos.

== Chart performance ==
Chart (1973)	Peak position
US Hot Country Songs (Billboard)	12
