= Amanda (Don Williams song) =

1973 song written by Bob McDill

Single by Don Williams

from the album Don Williams Volume One
- A-side: "Come Early Morning"
- Released: May 1973
- Recorded: ca. March 1973
- Genre: Country
- Length: 3:08
- Label: JMI 24
- Songwriter: Bob McDill
- Producer: Allen Reynolds

Don Williams singles chronology
"Come Early Morning" (1973)	"Amanda" (1973)	"Atta Way to Go" (1973)

"Amanda"

Single by Waylon Jennings

from the album Greatest Hits
- B-side: "Lonesome, On'ry, and Mean"
- Released: April 1979
- Recorded: July 15, 1974 (original); 1979 (new overdubs for single release)
- Genre: Country
- Length: 2:56
- Label: RCA 11596
- Songwriter: Bob McDill
- Producer: Waylon Jennings

Waylon Jennings singles chronology
"Don't You Think This Outlaw Bit's Done Got Out of Hand" (1978)	"Amanda" (1979)	"Come with Me" (1979)

"Amanda" is a 1973 song written by Bob McDill and recorded by both Don Williams (1973) and Waylon Jennings (1974). "Amanda" was Waylon Jennings's eighth solo number one on the country chart. The single stayed at number one for three weeks on the Billboard Hot Country Singles chart.

As recorded by Jennings, "Amanda" had been a track on his 1974 album The Ramblin' Man, but was not released as a single at that time; two other tracks, "I'm a Ramblin' Man" and "Rainy Day Woman," were. More than 4½ years later, new overdubs were added to the original track and placed on his first greatest hits album. In April 1979 the song was issued as a single, and it soon became one of the biggest country hits of 1979. "Amanda" is a love song of a man approaching middle age and reflecting how his life is and how his wife could have done better without him.

== Other versions ==
"Amanda" was first recorded and released as a single by country singer Don Williams in the summer of 1973 as the flip side of his No. 12 hit "Come Early Morning." Williams' version reached No. 33 on the Billboard Hot Country Singles chart.

The master for both "Come Early Morning" and "Amanda," along with Williams' other recordings for JMI Records, were sold to ABC-Dot Records in 1974.

Chris Stapleton covered this song on the 2017 tribute album to Don Williams "Gentle Giants: The Songs of Don Williams".

Billy Joe Royal released a version of the song.

== Charts ==
=== Don Williams ===
Chart (1973)	Peak position
US Hot Country Songs (Billboard)	33
Australia (Kent Music Report)	65

=== Waylon Jennings ===
Chart (1979)	Peak position
US Hot Country Songs (Billboard)	1
US Billboard Hot 100	54
US Adult Contemporary (Billboard)	40
Canadian RPM Country Tracks	1
Canadian RPM Top Singles	67
Canadian RPM Adult Contemporary Tracks	7

=== Year-end charts ===
Chart (1979)	Position
US Hot Country Songs (Billboard)	3
