= Nashville Songwriters Hall of Fame =

Music hall of fame

Coordinates: 36.1569°N 86.7782°W

The Nashville Songwriters Hall of Fame was established in 1970 by the Nashville Songwriters Foundation, Inc. in Nashville, Tennessee, United States. A non-profit organization, its objective is to honor and preserve the songwriting legacy that is uniquely associated with the music community in the city of Nashville. The Foundation's stated purpose is to educate, archive, and celebrate the contributions of the members of the Nashville Songwriters Hall of Fame to the world of music.

The Nashville Songwriters Foundation, Inc., is governed by a board of directors, currently consisting of thirteen members. Annually, three songwriters are inducted into the Hall of Fame.

== Inductees ==
=== 1970s ===
1970

- Gene Autry
- Johnny Bond
- Albert E. Brumley
- A.P. Carter
- Ted Daffan
- Vernon Dalhart
- Rex Griffin
- Stuart Hamblen
- Pee Wee King
- Vic McAlpin
- Bob Miller
- Leon Payne
- Jimmie Rodgers
- Fred Rose
- Redd Stewart
- Floyd Tillman
- Merle Travis
- Ernest Tubb
- Cindy Walker
- Hank Williams, Sr.
- Bob Wills

1971

- Smiley Burnette
- Jenny Lou Carson
- Wilf Carter
- Zeke Clements
- Jimmie Davis
- Alton & Rabon Delmore
- Al Dexter
- Vaughn Horton
- Bradley Kincaid
- Bill Monroe
- Bob Nolan
- Tex Owens
- Tex Ritter
- Carson J. Robison
- Gene Sullivan
- Tim Spencer
- Jimmy Wakely
- Wiley Walker
- Scotty Wiseman

1972

- Boudleaux and Felice Bryant
- Lefty Frizzell
- Jack Rhodes
- Don Robertson

1973

- Jack Clement
- Don Gibson
- Harlan Howard
- Roger Miller
- Ed Nelson, Jr.
- Steve Nelson
- Willie Nelson

1974

- Hank Cochran

1975

- Bill Anderson
- Danny Dill
- Eddie Miller
- Marty Robbins
- Wayne Walker
- Marijohn Wilkin

1976

- Carl Belew
- Dallas Frazier
- John D. Loudermilk
- Moon Mullican
- Curly Putman
- Mel Tillis

1977

- Johnny Cash
- Woody Guthrie
- Merle Haggard
- Kris Kristofferson

1978

- Joe Allison
- Tom T. Hall
- Hank Snow
- Don Wayne

1979

- Rev. Thomas A. Dorsey
- Charles Louvin
- Ira Louvin
- Elsie McWilliams
- Joe South

=== 1980s ===
1980

- Huddie "Leadbelly" Ledbetter
- Mickey Newbury
- Ben Peters
- Ray Stevens

1981

- Bobby Braddock
- Ray Whitley

1982

- Chuck Berry
- William J. "Billy" Hill

1983

- W.C. Handy
- Loretta Lynn
- Beasley Smith

1984

- Hal David
- Billy Sherrill

1985

- Bob McDill
- Carl Perkins

1986

- Otis Blackwell
- Dolly Parton

1987

- Roy Orbison
- Sonny Throckmorton

1988

- Hoagy Carmichael
- Troy Seals

1989

- Rory Michael Bourke
- Maggie Cavender
- Sanger D. "Whitey" Shafer

=== 1990s ===
1990

- Sue Brewer
- Ted Harris
- Jimmy Webb

1991

- Charlie Black
- Sonny Curtis

1992

- Max D. Barnes
- Wayland Holyfield

1993

- Red Lane
- Don Schlitz
- Conway Twitty

1994

- Jerry Foster (as Foster & Rice)
- Buddy Holly
- Richard Leigh
- Bill Rice (as Foster & Rice)
- Bobby Russell

1995

- Waylon Jennings
- Dickey Lee
- Dave Loggins

1996

- Jerry Chesnut
- Kenny O'Dell
- Buck Owens
- Norro Wilson

1997

- Wayne Carson
- Roger Cook
- Hank Thompson

1998

- Merle Kilgore
- Eddie Rabbitt
- Kent Robbins

1999

- Tommy Collins
- Wayne Kemp
- A. L. "Doodle" Owens
- Glenn Sutton

=== 2000s ===
2000

- Mac Davis
- Randy Goodrum
- Allen Reynolds
- Billy Edd Wheeler

2001

- Don Everly
- Phil Everly
- Dennis Linde
- Johnny Russell

2002

- Dean Dillon
- Bob Dylan
- Shel Silverstein

2003

- Hal Blair
- Rodney Crowell
- Paul Overstreet
- John Prine

2004

- Guy Clark
- Freddie Hart
- Dennis Morgan
- Billy Joe Shaver

2005

- Gary Burr
- Vince Gill
- Roger Murrah
- Jerry Reed
- Mike Reid

2006

- Jimmy Buffett
- Hugh Prestwood
- Jim Weatherly

2007

- Bob DiPiero
- Mac McAnally
- Flatt & Scruggs
- Dottie Rambo
- Hank Williams, Jr.

2008

- Matraca Berg
- John Hiatt
- Tom Shapiro

2009

- Kye Fleming
- Mark D. Sanders
- Tammy Wynette

=== 2010s ===
2010

- Pat Alger
- Steve Cropper
- Paul Davis
- Stephen Foster

2011

- John Bettis
- Garth Brooks
- Alan Jackson
- Thom Schuyler
- Allen Shamblin

2012

- Tony Arata
- Mary Chapin Carpenter
- Larry Henley
- Kim Williams

2013

- Will Jennings
- Layng Martine Jr.
- Randy Owen
- Jeffrey Steele

2014

- John Anderson
- Paul Craft
- Tom Douglas
- Gretchen Peters

2015

- Rosanne Cash
- Mark James
- Even Stevens
- Craig Wiseman

2016

- Aaron Barker
- Beth Nielsen Chapman
- Bob Morrison
- Townes Van Zandt

2017

- Walt Aldridge
- Dewayne Blackwell
- Vern Gosdin
- Jim McBride
- Tim Nichols

2018

- Ronnie Dunn
- Byron Hill
- Wayne Kirkpatrick
- Joe Melson
- K.T. Oslin

2019

- Larry Gatlin
- Marcus Hummon
- Kostas Lazarides
- Rivers Rutherford
- Sharon Vaughn
- Dwight Yoakam

=== 2020s ===
2020

- Kent Blazy
- Steve Earle
- Bobbie Gentry
- Brett James
- Spooner Oldham

2021

- Rhett Akins
- Buddy Cannon
- Amy Grant
- Toby Keith
- John Scott Sherrill

2022

- Hillary Lindsey
- David Malloy
- Chips Moman
- Gary Nicholson
- Shania Twain
- Steve Wariner

2023

- Casey Beathard
- Kix Brooks
- John Jarrard
- Rafe Van Hoy
- David Lee Murphy
- Keith Urban

2024

- Al Anderson
- David Bellamy (of The Bellamy Brothers)
- Dan Penn
- Liz Rose
- Victoria Shaw
- Tony Joe White

2025

- Steve Bogard
- JJ Cale
- Don Cook
- Emmylou Harris
- Jim Lauderdale
- Tony Martin
- Brad Paisley

2026

- Shawn Camp
- Bruce Channel
- Lyle Lovett
- Lee Thomas Miller
- Taylor Swift

== See also ==
- List of music museums
- Songwriters Hall of Fame
