= Why Have You Left the One You Left Me For =

1978 single by Crystal Gayle

Single by Crystal Gayle

from the album When I Dream
- B-side: "Cry Me a River"
- Released: December 2, 1978
- Genre: Country
- Length: 2:52
- Label: United Artists
- Songwriter: Mark True
- Producer: Allen Reynolds

Crystal Gayle singles chronology
| "Talking in Your Sleep" (1978) | "Why Have You Left the One You Left Me For" (1978) | "When I Dream" (1979) |

"Why Have You Left the One You Left Me For" is a song written by Mark True, and recorded by American country music artist Crystal Gayle. It was released in October 1978 as the second single from the album When I Dream. The song was Gayle's sixth number one on the country chart. The single stayed at number one for two weeks (Jan. 26 & Feb. 3, 1979) and spent a total of ten weeks on the country chart.

== Charts ==
=== Weekly charts ===
| Chart (1978–1979) | Peak position |
|---|---|
| US Hot Country Songs (Billboard) | 1 |
| U.S. Billboard Easy Listening | 22 |
| Canadian RPM Country Tracks | 1 |
| Canadian RPM Adult Contemporary | 16 |

=== Year-end charts ===
| Chart (1979) | Position |
|---|---|
| US Hot Country Songs (Billboard) | 10 |
