= W. B. Ray High School =

Location
- 1002 Texan Trail; Corpus Christi, Texas; United States; 27.75225°N 97.3948°W

Information
- Type: Public, Secondary
- Established: 1950
- Principal: Roxanne Gonzalez Cuevas
- Teaching staff: 94.75 (FTE)
- Grades: 9–12
- Enrollment: 1,588 (2023-2024)
- Student to teacher ratio: 16.76
- Colors: Scarlet and silver
- Mascot: Tex and Mary Lou
- Yearbook: Silver Spur
- Website: ray.ccisd.us

W. B. Ray High School is a 5A secondary school centrally located in Corpus Christi, Texas, United States, and is part of the Corpus Christi Independent School District. The school is named in honor of CCISD school board president, William Benton Ray. W. B. Ray High School opened in 1950. Ray High School is noted for its Socratic method, a system based on teacher and student interaction that promulgates discussion and inquiry-based learning in the classroom.

W. B. Ray High School one of 46 high schools in Texas designated as a World School by the International Baccalaureate Programme. W. B. Ray High School is the only high school in CCISD which offers the International Baccalaureate Program and is the district's only program for Gifted and Talented students at the high school level, offering higher level academic courses that surpass Honors and AP courses in both rigor and difficulty.

== History ==
The first principal was George Broad.

Construction began circa April 1949. It had a cost of $3,500,000. The opening of Ray relieved Roy Miller High School, which had been just renamed from Corpus Christi High School; each high school at the time took about half of the public high school students in Corpus Christi.

== Demographics ==
With a student enrollment of approximately 2,100 students, Ray High School has an ethnic distribution of 62% Hispanic, 32% White, 5% Black, & 1% other (including Native Americans, Pacific Islanders, and Asians). The school's boundary area is varied in socioeconomic strata, ranging from extremely affluent multi-million-dollar homes to multi-family complexes.

== Profile ==
The school principal is Roxanne Cuevas.

The school's motto is "Fighting Texans." The mascots are "Tex" and "Mary Lou."

== International Baccalaureate ==
Ray's International Baccalaureate program graduated its inaugural class in 2013. Since then, graduates have been accepted for admission at some of the most prestigious academic institutions and programs in the world including Harvard, MIT, Yale, Columbia, Georgetown, NYU, Vanderbilt, Cornell, Brown, Northwestern, Tufts, Washington University in St. Louis, Stanford, Rice, Duke, the American University in Paris, SNHU, University of Notre Dame, and Dartmouth among others.

== Extracurricular involvement ==
Ray High School participates in a variety of extracurricular activities. Clubs and organizations are available in academics, service, performing arts, publications, and special interests. Competitive sports for young men and women include basketball, baseball, track, soccer, softball, wrestling, football, cross-country, swimming and diving, golf, volleyball, tennis, and recently water polo. The school's award-winning Academic Decathlon and Mock Trial teams regularly advance to the state level. The Ray Speech and Debate team is a regional powerhouse and a frequent competitor at prominent national contests, such as NIETOC, NSDA, and Tournament of Champions. Additionally, the Speech and Debate team is recognized on the state level by the Texas Forensic Association, and has had a student compete for Team USA in Debate.

== School uniform ==
This school has a simple dress code: any color shirt and pants, but can not be showing (stomach, etc.) anything. Assistant principals and armed police officers guard the main hallways in search of dress code offenders. In 2000, there was a push in the administration (led by then principal, Dr. Bruce Scott at the time) to ban flip-flops, but student and parent outcry and lack of support from teachers led to this being dropped.

== Athletics ==
- 1951-52 Set Texas state record in 440 yard relay at 42.64 seconds.
- 1959-60 Won Texas State Football 4A Championship defeating Katy 20–6.

== Notable alumni ==
- David Baxter, class of 1955, World Series of Poker winner
- Charles Butt, class of 1955, Chair of the H-E-B supermarket chain
- Bob Creech (b. 1949), former NFL Player
- Arnold Davis, former NFL player
- Farrah Fawcett, model and actress
- Bill Glass, former NFL player
- Clint Gresham, Seattle Seahawks long snapper
- Martin Gurule, murderer and death row escapee
- Jim Heath, singer, songwriter and guitarist known by his stage name The Reverend Horton Heat
- John Kline, class of 1965, member of the House of Representatives
- Chris Layton, member of Stevie Ray Vaughan's band, Double Trouble
- Terrence McNally, class of 1955, was an American playwright, librettist, and screenwriter
- Kent Nix, former NFL player
- Paul Peress, drummer, composer, producer
- Larry C. Price, class of 1972, two-time Pulitzer Prize–winning journalist and documentary photographer.
- Dody Roach, class of 1955, World Series of Poker winner
- Sarah Saldaña, class of 1970, attorney
- Pepe Serna, actor
- Bart Shirley, former MLB player (LA Dodgers & NY Mets)
- Susan Taylor (aka Taylor Pie), singer/songwriter, member of the Pozo-Seco Singers
- Jim Yeats, class of 1954, NFL player

== Principals ==
- George Broad (1951-1956)
- U.D. Henslee (1957-1963)
- W.E. Hall (1964-1975)
- Lowell Norman (1976-1986)
- Bill Hamrick (1987-1995)
- Bruce Scott (1996-2002)
- Dawn Dorsey (2003-2005)
- Steven Gonzales (2005-2007)
- Richard Peltz (2007-2008) (intern principal)
- Cecilia Reynolds-Perez (2008-2018)
- Roxanne Gonzalez Cuevas (2019–present)
