= Your Kisses Will =

Single by Crystal Gayle

from the album We Should Be Together
- B-side: "Time Will Prove That I'm Right"
- Released: July 1979
- Recorded: November 1, 1976; Nashville, Tennessee, US
- Studio: Jack's Tracks (Nashville, Tennessee)
- Genre: Country; Country pop
- Length: 2:05
- Label: United Artists
- Songwriter: Van Stephenson
- Producer: Allen Reynolds

Crystal Gayle singles chronology
| "When I Dream" (1979) | "Your Kisses Will" (1979) | "Half the Way" (1979) |

"Your Kisses Will" is a song written by Van Stephenson, and recorded by American country music artist Crystal Gayle. It was released in July 1979 as the first single from the album We Should Be Together. The song reached #7 on the Billboard Hot Country Singles & Tracks chart.

== Background ==
"Your Kisses Will" was originally record on November 1, 1976, at Jack's Tracks, a studio located in Nashville, Tennessee. Other tracks recorded at the session were "River Road", "Through Believing in Love Songs", and a cover of "Green Door". The session was produced by Allen Reynolds.

"Your Kisses Will" was officially released as a single in July 1979 and peaked at number seven on the Billboard Hot Country Singles chart later that year. Additionally, the song reached the top-forty of the Billboard Hot Adult Contemporary Tracks chart, reaching thirty-fifth position there. "Your Kisses Will" also peaked in the fourteenth position on the Canadian RPM Country Songs chart and the fifth position of the RPM Adult Contemporary Tracks list.

== Track listing ==
7" vinyl single

- "Your Kisses Will" – 2:05
- "Time Will Prove That I'm Right" – 2:38

== Weekly charts ==
| Chart (1979) | Peak position |
|---|---|
| Canada Country Songs (RPM) | 14 |
| Canada Adult Contemporary Tracks (RPM | 5 |
| US Hot Country Singles (Billboard) | 7 |
| US Adult Contemporary (Billboard) | 35 |
