= I Never Made Love (Till I Made It with You) =

Single by Mac Davis

from the album Till I Made It with You
- B-side: "I Think I'm Gonna Rain"
- Released: April 1985
- Genre: Country
- Label: MCA
- Songwriter(s): Bob McDill
- Producer(s): Jimmy Bowen

Mac Davis singles chronology
"Caroline's Still in Georgia" (1984)	"I Never Made Love (Till I Made It with You)" (1985)	"I Feel the Country Callin' Me" (1985)

"I Never Made Love (Till I Made It with You)" is a single by American country music artist Mac Davis. It was released in April 1985 as the first single from his album Till I Made It with You. The song peaked at number 10 on the Billboard Hot Country Singles chart, making it Davis's last top-10 country hit.

== Chart performance ==
Chart (1985)	Peak position
U.S. Billboard Hot Country Singles	10
Canadian RPM Country Tracks	6
