= Sonny Davis (linebacker) =

American football player (born 1938)

No. 88
- Position: Linebacker

Personal information
- Born: September 25, 1938 (age 88); Corpus Christi, Texas, U.S.
- Listed height: 6 ft 2 in (1.88 m)
- Listed weight: 219 lb (99 kg)

Career information
- High school: W. B. Ray (Corpus Christi)
- College: Baylor
- NFL draft: 1961: 4th round, 44th overall pick
- AFL draft: 1961: 4th round, 29th overall pick

Career history
- Dallas Cowboys (1961)

Awards and highlights
- Second-team All-SWC (1960)

Career NFL statistics
- Games played: 2
- Stats at Pro Football Reference

Arnold Allen "Sonny" Davis (born September 25, 1938) is an American former professional football player who was a linebacker for the Dallas Cowboys of the National Football League (NFL). He played college football for the Baylor.

== Early life ==
Davis attended W. B. Ray High School. He accepted a football scholarship from Baylor University, where he was a two-way player as an offensive and defensive end.

== Professional career ==
Davis was selected by the Dallas Cowboys in the fourth round (44th overall) of the 1961 NFL draft and by the Denver Broncos in the fourth round (29th overall) of the 1961 AFL draft.

On January 8, 1961, he signed with the Cowboys. He was converted from an offensive end into a linebacker during training camp. On September 26, he was placed on the injured reserve list after suffering a knee injury in the second game against the Minnesota Vikings. He was waived before the start of the 1962 season.
