= The Ramblin' Man =

Studio album by Waylon Jennings
- Released: September 1974
- Recorded: February – July 1974
- Studio: Glaser Sound (Nashville, Tennessee)
- Genre: Outlaw Country
- Length: 32:21; 41:50 (with bonus tracks)
- Label: RCA Victor
- Producer: Waylon Jennings

Waylon Jennings chronology
This Time (1974)	The Ramblin' Man (1974)	Dreaming My Dreams (1975)

Singles from The Ramblin' Man
- 1. "I'm a Ramblin' Man" Released: July 1974; 2. "Rainy Day Woman" Released: December 21, 1974; 3. "Amanda" Released: April 1979

Professional ratings
Review scores
Source	Rating
Allmusic	4.5/5 stars

The Ramblin' Man is the twenty-first studio album by American country music artist Waylon Jennings, released on RCA Victor in 1974.

== Recording and composition ==
With a slightly more commercial sound than some of his recent records, The Ramblin' Man remained true to Jennings' outlaw country image and uncompromising musical vision. The album, which was recorded at Glaser Sound Studios, was released at what was still considered to be the height of the outlaw movement in country music, and this was reflected in its chart success, with the LP peaking at #3 on the country charts, Jennings best showing since Love of the Common People in 1967. Jennings produced it himself, although Tompall Glaser co-produced "Rainy Day Woman" and Ray Pennington co-produced "Oklahoma Sunshine" and "I'm a Ramblin' Man," the latter of which he also wrote. Pennington recorded "I'm a Ramblin' Man" in 1967 for Capitol Records and took it to #29 on the country charts. Jennings' version would be his second #1 on the country chart and also appeared on Australian charts. "Rainy Day Woman" was released in December 1974 as the second single from the album and reached #2 on the Billboard Hot Country Singles & Tracks chart. The Bob McDill ballad "Amanda" was not released as a single at this time; more than 4½ years later, new overdubs were added to the original track and placed on his first greatest hits album. The song was issued as a single and it became one of the biggest country hits of 1979.

The album also includes a gutsy cover of the Allman Brothers' "Midnight Rider," cementing Jennings' fearless reputation as a leader of the "progressive" country sound. The photo on the album cover was shot at Muhlenbrink's (formerly the Red Dog Saloon).

== Critical reception ==
AllMusic: "If he had created a sketch of outlaw on Honky Tonk Heroes, he perfected the marketable version of it here, making it a little slicker, a little more commercial, and a whole lot more unstoppable. If the songs aren't the equal of Honky Tonk Heroes or even This Time, The Ramblin' Man has a wilder sound and a greater diversity of songs that make it seem more unruly than its immediate predecessor and more blatantly outlaw...There are moments of reflection, yet even those feed into the outlaw picture."

== Track listing ==
No.	Title	Writer(s)	Length
1.	"I'm a Ramblin' Man"	Ray Pennington	2:49
2.	"Rainy Day Woman"	Jennings	2:31
3.	"Cloudy Days"	Billy Ray Reynolds	2:41
4.	"Midnight Rider"	Gregg Allman, Robert Kim Payne	3:24
5.	"Oklahoma Sunshine"	Hal Bynum, Bud Reneau	3:29
6.	"The Hunger"	Lee Fry	3:31
7.	"I Can't Keep My Hands Off of You"	Bobby Borchers, Mack Vickery	3:38
8.	"Memories of You and I"	Lee Clayton	4:16
9.	"It'll Be Her"	Reynolds	3:03
10.	"Amanda"	Bob McDill	2:56

=== Bonus tracks ===
1. "Got a Lot Going for Me" (Dave Kirby) – 2:32
2. "The Last Letter" (Rex Griffin) – 4:07
3. "The One I Sing My Love Song To" (Wayland Holyfield) – 2:49

== Personnel ==
- Waylon Jennings - guitar, vocals
- Joe Allen - bass guitar
- Leon Rhodes - bass guitar
- Larrie Londin - drums
- Richie Albright - drums
- Larry Whitmore - rhythm guitar
- Dave Kirby - electric guitar
- Thomas Jackson - fiddle
- Alfred Newell - guitar
- Billy Ray Reynolds - guitar
- Kyle Lehning - piano, engineer
- Bunky Keels - piano
- Carl Gay - guitar
- Duke Goff - guitar
- Randy Scruggs - guitar
- John W. Wilkin - guitar
- Roger Crabtree - harmonica
- David Roys - engineer (Technician)
- Herb Burnette - art direction
- Bob Jones - photography
- Ray Pennington - producer
- Ray Pachucki - engineer
- Bobby Thompson - rhythm guitar
- Ralph Mooney - steel guitar
