= Clint Gresham =

American football player (born 1986)

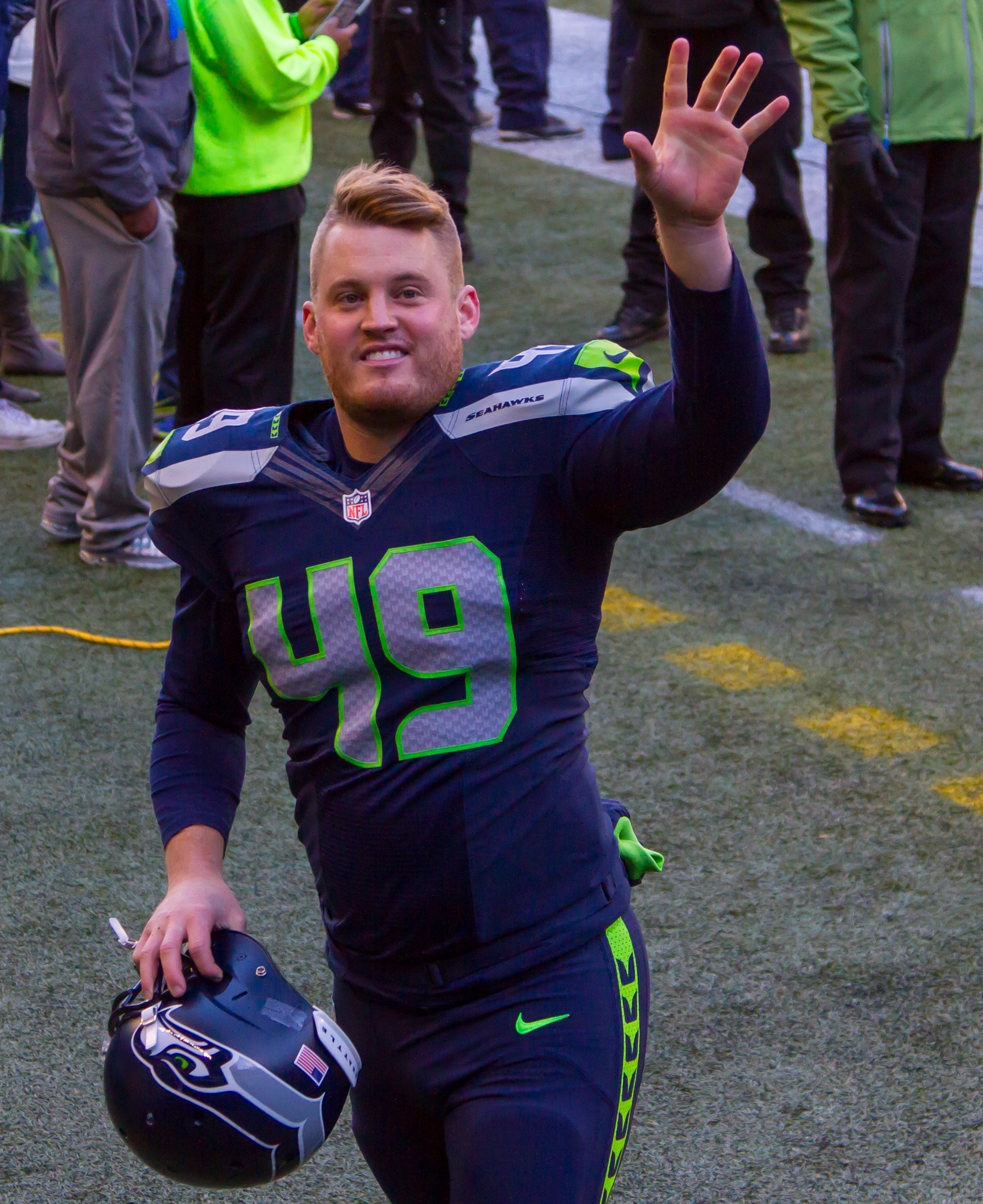
- Gresham with the Seattle Seahawks in 2014

No. 49
- Position: Long snapper

Personal information
- Born: August 24, 1986 (age 40); Corpus Christi, Texas, U.S.
- Listed height: 6 ft 3 in (1.91 m)
- Listed weight: 240 lb (109 kg)

Career information
- High school: Ray (Corpus Christi)
- College: Texas Christian
- NFL draft: 2010: undrafted

Career history
- New Orleans Saints (2010)*; Seattle Seahawks (2010–2015)
- * Offseason or practice squad member only

Awards and highlights
- Super Bowl champion (XLVIII)

Career NFL statistics
- Games played: 96
- Total tackles: 5
- Stats at Pro Football Reference

Clint Gresham (born August 24, 1986) is an American former professional football player who was a long snapper in the National Football League (NFL). He played college football for the TCU Horned Frogs.

== Early life ==
Clint Gresham was born to Jim Gresham and Martha Booe on August 24, 1986. Gresham attended W.B. Ray High School in Corpus Christi, Texas, until his graduation in 2005.

== College career ==
He attended the University of Oklahoma, as a preferred walk-on, but ultimately transferred to Texas Christian University, graduating in 2009. While at TCU, Gresham majored in entrepreneurial management with a minor in communications.

== Professional career ==
Gresham was the only long snapper invited to the 2010 NFL draft. However, he was not selected in the draft, and signed as an undrafted free agent for the 2010 season by the New Orleans Saints, Gresham was picked up on waivers by the Seattle Seahawks on August 1, 2010. On March 20, 2015, he re-signed with the Seahawks on a three-year contract worth $2.7 million total and a $300,000 signing bonus. He was released by the Seahawks on March 16, 2016.

== Post-NFL career ==
Gresham is an author and speaker in Dallas, Texas. His latest book is called "Becoming: Loving the Process to Wholeness" and is self-described as a roadmap for personal growth and learning who you are.

== Personal life ==
Gresham is a Christian, and a Young Life leader.

Gresham's father, Jim, played football at Texas from 1974 to 1976. His cousin, Phil Pratt, played football at Oklahoma in the 1960s.

In March 2015, Gresham married Matti Gresham (née Schumacher). The two have a young daughter and son (due in January 2021).
