= When I Dream =

Studio album by Crystal Gayle
- Released: June 2, 1978
- Studio: Jack's Tracks (Nashville, Tennessee)
- Genre: Country
- Length: 35:18
- Label: United Artists
- Producer: Allen Reynolds

Crystal Gayle chronology
I've Cried the Blue Right Out of My Eyes (1978)	When I Dream (1978)	We Should Be Together (1979)

Singles from When I Dream
- 1. "Talking in Your Sleep" Released: January 6, 1978; 2. "Why Have You Left the One You Left Me For" Released: October 1978; 3. "When I Dream" Released: April 14, 1979

Professional ratings
Review scores
Source	Rating
AllMusic	3/5 stars

When I Dream is the fifth studio album by American country music singer Crystal Gayle. It was released on June 2, 1978, at the height of her career. It was her second consecutive #2 country album on the Billboard charts. Two singles from the album reached #1 on the Country Singles chart: "Talking in Your Sleep" (also a Top 20 Pop hit) and "Why Have You Left the One You Left Me For". The title song, "When I Dream", is a longer re-recorded version of a song that appeared originally on her 1975 debut album Crystal Gayle, and reached #3. A fourth single, "Heart Mender", peaked at #58. "Hello I Love You" was featured in the 1982 movie, Six Pack, starring Kenny Rogers, Erin Gray and Diane Lane.

The album achieved a gold disc the year it was released but was certified platinum by the RIAA in 1982. It was also Gayle's second album to chart in the UK, where it reached #25, and was awarded a silver disc by the BPI.

== Track listing ==
No.	Title	Writer(s)	Length
1.	"Why Have You Left the One You Left Me For"	Mark True	2:52
2.	"Heart Mender"	Richard Leigh, Milton Blackford	2:54
3.	"Hello I Love You"	Roger Cook, Charles Cochran	2:31
4.	"Talking in Your Sleep"	Cook, Bobby Wood	2:51
5.	"Paintin' This Old Town Blue"	William T. Davidson	2:07
6.	"When I Dream"	Sandy Mason Theoret	3:21
7.	"Don't Treat Me Like a Stranger"	Dave Loggins	3:12
8.	"Too Good to Throw Away"	Bob McDill	2:50
9.	"Cry Me a River"	Arthur Hamilton	3:11
10.	"Wayward Wind"	Herbert Newman, Stanley Lebowsky	2:53
11.	"Someday Soon"	Ian Tyson	3:50
12.	"I Still Miss Someone"	Johnny Cash, Roy Cash Jr.	2:45

== Personnel ==
- Crystal Gayle - vocals
- Biff Watson, Billy Sanford, David Kirby, Johnny Christopher, Ray Edenton, Reggie Young, Rod Smarr, Sonny Curtis - guitar
- Bob Moore, Joe Allen, Mike Leech, Richard "Spady" Brannan, Tommy Cogbill - bass
- Lloyd Green - steel guitar, resonator guitar
- Chris Leuzinger - slide guitar
- Bobby Emmons, Bobby Wood, Charles Cochran, Dwight Scott, Hargus "Pig" Robbins, Richard Durrett - keyboards
- Cindy Reynolds - harp
- Gene Chrisman, Jimmy Isbell, Kenny Malone, Vic Mastrianni - drums, percussion

== Production ==
- Produced by Allen Reynolds
- Recorded by Garth Fundis
- Engineered by John Donegan
- Mastering: Glenn Meadows

== Charts ==
=== Weekly charts ===
Chart (1978)	Peak position
UK Albums (OCC)	25
US Billboard 200	52
US Top Country Albums (Billboard)	2

=== Year-end charts ===
Chart (1978)	Position
US Top Country Albums (Billboard)	28
Chart (1979)	Position
US Top Country Albums (Billboard)	6
