= We Should Be Together (Don Williams song) =

Single by Don Williams

from the album Don Williams Volume Two
- B-side: "Millers Cave"
- Released: March 2, 1974
- Genre: Country
- Length: 3:02
- Label: JMI
- Songwriter(s): Allen Reynolds
- Producer(s): Allen Reynolds

Don Williams singles chronology
"Atta Way to Go" (1973)	"We Should Be Together" (1974)	"Down the Road I Go" (1974)

"We Should Be Together" is a song written by Allen Reynolds and recorded by American country music artist Don Williams. It was released in March 1974 as the second single from the album Don Williams Volume Two. The song reached number five on the Billboard Hot Country Singles and Tracks chart.

== Chart performance ==
Chart (1974)	Peak position
US Hot Country Songs (Billboard)	5
