= Rednecks, White Socks and Blue Ribbon Beer =

Single by Johnny Russell

from the album Rednecks, White Socks and Blue Ribbon Beer
- B-side: "She's a Natural Woman"
- Released: July 30, 1973
- Genre: Country
- Length: 2:46
- Label: RCA
- Songwriters: Wayland Holyfield; Bob McDill
- Producer: Jerry Bradley

Johnny Russell singles chronology
"Chained" (1973)	"Rednecks, White Socks and Blue Ribbon Beer" (1973)	"The Baptism of Jesse Taylor" (1973)

"Rednecks, White Socks and Blue Ribbon Beer" is a song written by Bob McDill and Wayland Holyfield, and recorded by American country music artist Johnny Russell. It was released in July 1973 as the first single from his album Rednecks, White Socks and Blue Ribbon Beer. The song peaked at number 4 on the Billboard Hot Country Singles chart, making it his only top-ten. It also reached number 1 on the RPM Country Tracks chart in Canada, thus becoming his only number 1.

The song is performed from the perspective of a patron of a neighborhood tavern. Although he notes the cigarette smoke hanging in the air, and describes several customers – patrons who either make an unwanted pass at a female bartender, a cowboy who "cusses the pinball machine", a drunken customer who has become boisterous and another customer who phones his wife to tell her he'll soon be leaving for home – he also refers to the good times and camaraderie of friends at the establishment ("The four-thirty crowd is about to arrive/The sun's goin' down, and we'll all soon be here").

Johnny Russell revealed in later years that at the time he recorded the song in 1973, he was told by the manager of Charley Pride, with whom Russell was touring and performing, that Pride, RCA's biggest selling artist, would take offense to the song's "racial" nature. Russell sought the advice of famous guitarist and RCA Vice President Chet Atkins, who encouraged him to simply call Pride on the telephone. Pride told Russell that if he thought the song would be a hit for the label, that he should release the song. Nonetheless, Russell was never allowed to perform the song at any shows featuring Pride, who incidentally went on to successfully cover Russell's own "Act Naturally". "I wanted to hit him and I still want to hit him" - Johnny Russell on Charley Pride's manager.

A reference is also made to "There Stands the Glass", a No. 1 country hit by Webb Pierce, which is noted as playing on the jukebox.

== Chart performance ==
Chart (1973)	Peak position
U.S. Billboard Hot Country Singles	4
Canadian RPM Country Tracks	1
