= The Door Is Always Open =

"The Door is Always Open"

Single by Dave & Sugar

from the album Dave & Sugar
- B-side: "Late Nite Country Lovin' Music"
- Released: April 1976
- Recorded: January 22, 1976
- Studio: RCA Victor Studio, Nashville, Tennessee
- Genre: Country
- Length: 2:41
- Label: RCA
- Songwriter(s): Dickey Lee, Bob McDill
- Producer(s): Jerry Bradley, Charley Pride

Dave & Sugar singles chronology
"Queen of the Silver Dollar" (1975)	"The Door is Always Open" (1976)	"I'm Gonna Love You" (1976)

"The Door is Always Open" is a country song written by Dickey Lee and Bob McDill. First recorded by Tennessee Pulleybone for JMI Records, it went to number 75 on the Hot Country Songs chart in 1973. A version by Lois Johnson, also in 1975, went to number 70 on the country music chart.

It was the Dave & Sugar version, released in 1976, that was released to radio and became known to audiences. That July, the song was the group's first number one hit on the Billboard Hot Country Singles chart.

== Chart performance ==
=== Tennessee Pulleybone ===
Chart (1973)	Peak position
US Hot Country Songs (Billboard)	75

=== Lois Johnson ===
Chart (1975)	Peak position
US Hot Country Songs (Billboard)	70

=== Dave & Sugar ===
Chart (1976)	Peak position
US Hot Country Songs (Billboard)	1
Australia (Kent Music Report)	84
Canadian RPM Country Tracks	1

== Other versions ==
- Waylon Jennings later cut it as an album track for his 1975 album Dreaming My Dreams.
- Dolly Parton performed the song in a November 1976 episode of her variety show Dolly!.
- A Dutch translation "De deur staat altijd open" by duo Frank & Mirella was a minor Dutch hit during the summer of 1976.
- Jamey Johnson covered his own version of the song on his 2008 album That Lonesome Song.
