= Jim Yeats =

American football player (1936–2023)

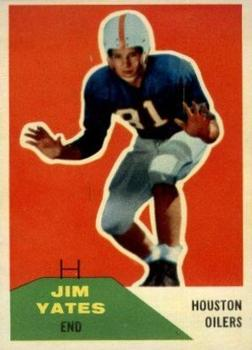
- 1960 Fleer trading card

No. 80
- Position: Tight end

Personal information
- Born: January 21, 1936; Bee County, Texas, U.S.
- Died: September 4, 2023 (aged 87)
- Listed height: 6 ft 4 in (1.93 m)
- Listed weight: 245 lb (111 kg)

Career information
- High school: W. B. Ray (Corpus Christi, Texas)
- College: Florida (1954–1957)
- NFL draft: 1958: undrafted

Career history
- Green Bay Packers (1959)*; Houston Oilers (1960); Denver Broncos (1961)*
- * Offseason or practice squad member only
- Stats at Pro Football Reference

James Melvin Yeats (January 21, 1936 – September 4, 2023) was an American professional football tight end who played for the Houston Oilers of the American Football League (AFL). He played college football at the University of Florida.

== Early life and college ==
James Melvin Yeats was born on January 21, 1936, in Bee County, Texas. He was raised in Beeville and Corpus Christi, Texas. He attended W. B. Ray High School in Corpus Christi, and graduated in 1954.

Yeats played college football for the Florida Gators of the University of Florida. He was on the freshman team in 1954 and was a three-year letterman from 1955 to 1957. He played both offense and defense for the Gators. Yeats caught four passes for 67 yards in 1956.

== Professional career ==
Yeats signed with the Green Bay Packers of the National Football League on May 1, 1959. He was later released on August 10, 1959.

Yeats was signed by the Houston Oilers of the American Football League (AFL) in February 1960. His last name was incorrectly misspelled as "Yates" on his 1960 Fleer trading card. Yeats played in the Oilers' season opener on September 11, 1960. However, he suffered an injury and was waived three days later.

In June 1961, it was reported that Yeats would be joining the AFL's Denver Broncos for training camp. He officially signed with the team in July. He left the team later that month for a job opportunity.

== Personal life ==
Yeats died on September 4, 2023, at the age of 87. He was married to Barbara Burns from 1954 until his death. He worked at Reynolds Metals until retiring. Yeats also served as a University Interscholastic League referee for youth sporting events in Texas.
