= Lois Johnson =

American country music singer (1942–2014)

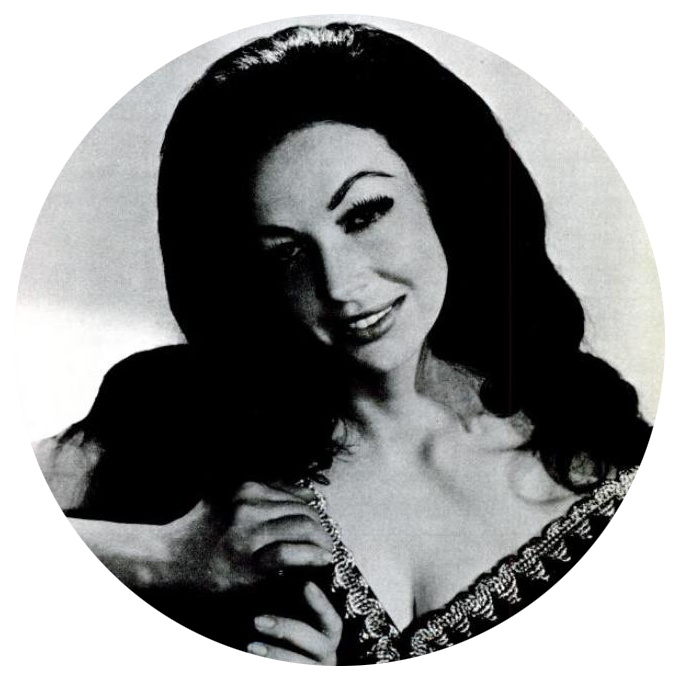
- Johnson in 1970

Background information
- Birth name: Lois Johnson
- Born: May 15, 1942; Union County, Tennessee, U.S.
- Origin: Maynardville, Tennessee, U.S.
- Died: July 7, 2014 (aged 72); Nashville, Tennessee, U.S.
- Genres: Country
- Occupation: Singer
- Instrument: Vocals
- Years active: 1969–1978
- Labels: Columbia, MGM, 20th Century, Polydor

Lois Johnson Scoggins (May 15, 1942 – July 7, 2014) was an American country music singer. She was from Maynardville, Tennessee. She recorded for different labels between 1969 and 1978, charted twenty singles on the Hot Country Songs charts. Her highest chart peak was "Loving You Will Never Grow Old", which reached No. 6 in 1975. Johnson toured with Hank Williams Jr. between 1970 and 1973.

She died at Vanderbilt University Medical Centre, Nashville, Tennessee, on July 7, 2014.

== Discography ==
=== Albums ===
Title	Details	Peak positions
Title	Details	US Country
Removing the Shadow (with Hank Williams Jr.)	Release date: September 1970; Label: MGM Records	21
Send Me Lovin' and a Whole Lotta Loving (with Hank Williams Jr.)	Release date: September 1972; Label: MGM Records	35
Lois Johnson	Release date: February 1975; Label: 20th Century Records	—
Loveshine	Release date: 1984; Label: EMH Records	—
"—" denotes releases that did not chart

=== Singles ===
Year	Title	Peak positions		Album
Year	Title	US Country	CAN Country	Album
1962	"I'll Let You Go and Wish You Well"	—	—	—
1965	"The Whole World Is Turning (Just for Us)"	—	—	—
1966	"G.I. Joe"	—	—	—
1966	"Daddy, Don't Hang Up the Phone"	—	—	—
1967	"Your Second Wedding Day"	—	—	—
1967	"Chicago with Love"	—	—	—
1968	"Tell Me a Lie"	—	—	—
1968	"One Drink Farther Away"	—	—	—
1969	"Softly and Tenderly"	74	—	—
1969	"Mama, Was His Love Worth Leaving Me"	—	—	—
1970	"When He Touches Me (Nothing Else Matters)"	48	—	—
1971	"From Warm to Cool to Cold"	65	—	—
1971	"Good Morning, Dear"	—	—	—
1971	"Breaking in a Brand New Broken Heart"	—	—	—
1972	"Rain-Rain"	63	—	—
1973	"Love Will Stand"	97	—	—
1974	"Come On In and Let Me Love You"	19	—	Lois Johnson
1974	"Loving You Will Never Grow Old"	6	10	Lois Johnson
1975	"You Know Just What I'd Do"	48	—	Lois Johnson
1975	"Hope for the Flowers"	95	—	—
1975	"The Door's Always Open"	70	—	—
1976	"Weep No More My Baby"	87	—	—
1976	"Midnight"	—	—	—
1977	"Your Pretty Roses Came Too Late"	20	—	—
1977	"I Hate Goodbyes"	40	—	—
1977	"All the Love We Threw Away" (with Bill Rice)	97	—	—
1978	"When I Need You"	63	—	—
1981	"Willie Rides Again"	—	—	—
1981	"It Won't Be Easy"	—	—	—
1984	"It Won't Be Easy" (re-release)	89	—	Loveshine
1984	"Middle of the Road"	—	—	—
1984	"Loveshine"	—	—	Loveshine
"—" denotes releases that did not chart

=== Singles with Hank Williams Jr. ===
Year	Title	Peak positions		Album
Year	Title	US Country	CAN Country	Album
1970	"Removing the Shadow"	23	27	Removing the Shadow
1970	"So Sad (To Watch Good Love Go Bad)"	12	10	Removing the Shadow
1971	"Send Me Some Lovin'"	14	31	Send Me Some Lovin' and a Whole Lotta Loving
1972	"Whole Lotta Loving"	22	25	Send Me Some Lovin' and a Whole Lotta Loving
