= Gove Scrivenor =

American musician

- Born: September 18, 1945 (age 80); New Haven, Connecticut
- Origin: United States
- Genres: Country music, folk music
- Occupation: Singer songwriter
- Years active: 1970–present
- Labels: TRX Records, Flying Fish

Richard Gove Scrivenor (b. September 18, 1945 New Haven, Connecticut) is an American singer, songwriter, and musician. Scrivenor is an autoharp and guitar player, and includes the instrument in many of his songs. He plays predominantly country and folk music.

== History ==
Gove moved to Nashville, Tennessee in the early 1970s after enlisting for four years in the United States Navy. In Nashville, he signed with noted music publisher Acuff-Rose, and then a recording and writing contract with TRX records. Scrivenor signed a management and booking deal with the Don Light Talent Agency and toured with fellow agency artists Delbert McClinton, Jimmy Buffett and the Original Coral Reefer Band. Scrivenor had played in a duo previously with Coral Reefer bassist Harry Dailey.

Gove Scrivenor playing an autoharp.

Also in the 1970s he played two years in succession on the popular PBS series "Austin City Limits" with Doc Watson and The Amazing Rhythm Aces. He played the character of Daniel Boone on the National Geographic Recording, "Cumberland Gap," written by Billy Ed Wheeler. Gove also did jingle work as well, including the early Opryland campaigns for TV and Busch Beer. He has played autoharp for artists Dolly Parton, Neil Young, Dan Seals, Hank Williams, Jr., Iris Dement and Glen Campbell.

When TRX Records shut down in the mid-1970s, Gove signed with Flying Fish Records and recorded his albums Shady Gove and Coconut Gove. Musicians such as Doc Watson, John Hartford, Marty Stuart, Buddy Emmons, Ben Keith (Neil Young), and Dave "Please Come To Boston" Loggins contributed to his recordings. These two albums were re-issued by Rounder Records (Flying Fish) in 1999 as a compilation titled Solid Gove. He was joined by John Prine, Nanci Griffith, Lari White, and Guthrie Trapp for his first Compass Records release Shine On, a collection of five self-penned and selected favorites by fellow artists.

His album, Made Of Sand, features guest appearances by Emmylou Harris, Guthrie Trapp, and Nanci Griffith. It was recorded at Jack Clements' "Cowboy Arms Hotel and Recording Spa" and John Prines' studio "The Butcher Shoppe" and produced by Pat McInerney and Gove.

== Discography ==
- Heavy Cowboy (1971)TRX Records
- Shady Gove (1976)Flying Fish Records
- Coconut Gove (1979)Flying Fish Records
- Solid Gove (1998) – includes the albums Coconut Gove and Shady Gove. Flying Fish Records
- Shine On (1998)Compass Records
- Made of Sand (2007)No Age Records
