= Wrong Road Again =

Single by Crystal Gayle

from the album Crystal Gayle
- B-side: "They Come Out at Night"
- Released: September 1974
- Studio: Jack Clement Recording (Nashville, Tennessee)
- Genre: Country
- Length: 2:17
- Label: United Artists
- Songwriter: Allen Reynolds
- Producer: Allen Reynolds

Crystal Gayle singles chronology
"Restless" (1974)	"Wrong Road Again" (1974)	"Beyond You" (1975)

"Wrong Road Again" is a song written by Allen Reynolds and recorded by American country music artist Crystal Gayle. It was released in September 1974 as the first single from the album Crystal Gayle.

== Recording history ==
Gayle's sister, Loretta Lynn, would cut and release a cover of the track one year after in 1975 on her album Home.

English singer Marianne Faithfull recorded a cover of the song on her country-flavoured album Dreamin' My Dreams in 1976.

Allen Reynolds, who wrote the song, recorded his own version on the Triple I label in 1978 and reached number 95 on the Billboard country charts.

Waylon Jennings would record the track in the 1970s, but his version never made it to release until 2025 when his son Shooter Jennings would put it on the posthumous album, Songbird, as the album’s 5th track.

== Chart performance ==
Chart (1974–1975)	Peak position
U.S. Billboard Hot Country Singles	6
Canadian RPM Country Tracks	17
