= Catfish John =

1972 song by Bob McDill and Allen Reynolds

Single by Johnny Russell

from the album Catfish John / Chained
- B-side: "Promises of Your Love"
- Released: November 6, 1972
- Genre: Country
- Length: 2:48
- Label: RCA
- Songwriters: Allen Reynolds; Bob McDill
- Producer: Jerry Bradley

Johnny Russell singles chronology
"Rain Falling on Me" (1972)	"Catfish John" (1972)	"Chained" (1973)

"Catfish John" is a song written by Bob McDill and Allen Reynolds first released on McDill's album Short Stories, and subsequently recorded and released by American country music artist Johnny Russell. It was released in November 1972 as the fourth single from the album, "Catfish John"/"Chained". The song is credited with propelling Bob McDill into the front ranks of country songwriters.

The song has also been performed by Jerry Garcia (Jerry Garcia Band, Old & In the Way), as well as other musicians. Toots Hibbert recorded the song on Fire on the Mountain: Reggae Celebrates the Grateful Dead (Pow Wow), a Grateful Dead tribute album. It has also been performed and recorded by Alison Krauss and Nitty Gritty Dirt Band. Australian country music band The Hawking Brothers released their version in 1973 reaching 32 on the charts.

== Content ==
The song is a story about a former slave, which emphasizes difficulties of the everyday life for Black people at the time, and about the singer who, in boyhood, found him an inspiration and source of Delta culture.

== Chart performance ==
Chart (1972–73)	Peak position
U.S. Billboard Hot Country Singles	12
Canadian RPM Country Tracks	3
