= Don Williams Volume One =

Studio album by Don Williams
- Released: June 1973
- Genre: Country
- Label: JMI
- Producer: Allen Reynolds

Don Williams chronology
Don Williams Volume One (1973)	Don Williams Volume Two (1974)

Singles from Don Williams Volume One
- 1. "The Shelter of Your Eyes" Released: 1973; 2. "Come Early Morning" Released: 1973

Don Williams Volume One is the debut studio album by American country music singer Don Williams. Released in 1973 on the JMI Records label, the album reached number five on the US Country Albums Chart. It was reissued in 1974 on the ABC DOT label and subsequently in 1980 on the MCA label. "The Shelter of Your Eyes" and "Come Early Morning" were released as singles in 1973.

== Background ==
From 1964 to 1971, Don Williams formed and played with the band the Pozo-Seco Singers. In 1966, the band signed with Columbia Records, due to the success of their first single, "Time". Williams left the band in 1971, and moved to Nashville, where he met producer and writer Allen Reynolds, who introduced Williams to country singer and businessman Jack Clement. Clement had recently founded JMI Records. Williams was soon signed to JMI records, and Reynolds went on to produce and write on Williams' next two albums.

Initially a songwriter demonstrator was recorded to sell Williams' songs to other artists, but without a strong initial response, they decided to record and release a full-length album.

== Content ==
At the time the album was released, the Nashville sound featured more elaborate orchestral arrangements, but Don Williams Volume One caught on.

In addition to producing the album, Reynolds contributed the song "I Recall a Gypsy Woman" written along with Bob McDill and Williams. While not initially released as a single in 1973, the song was released as the B-side from the Don Williams Volume Two album single "Atta Way Go", and as a single in the UK in 1976, where it became a minor hit.

Bob McDill had a hand in writing three of the album's songs, including the final song on the album, "Amanda", which was also included as the B-side on his number-12 hit "Come Early Morning". Williams' version reached number 33 on the Billboard Hot Country Singles chart.

When Williams died in 2017, his version of "Amanda" was singled out in his Rolling Stone obituary:

“In giving voice to songs like ‘Good Ole Boys Like Me,’ ‘Lord, I Hope This Day Is Good’ and ‘Amanda,’ Don Williams offered calm, beauty, and a sense of wistful peace that is in short supply these days,” Country Music Hall of Fame and Museum CEO Kyle Young said in a statement Friday. “His music will forever be a balm in troublesome times. Everyone who makes country music with grace, intelligence, and ageless intent will do so while standing on the shoulders of this gentle giant.”

The masters for both "Come Early Morning" and "Amanda," along with Williams' other recordings for JMI Records, were sold to ABC-Dot Records in 1974.

== Track listing ==
All songs written by Don Williams, except where noted. From the original vinyl:

No.	Title	Writer(s)	Length
1.	"Come Early Morning"	Bob McDill	3:08
2.	"Too Late to Turn Back Now"	Williams, Allen Reynolds	2:03
3.	"Endless Sleep"	Jody Reynolds, Dolores Nance	2:11
4.	"The Shelter of Your Eyes"		2:58
5.	"I Recall a Gypsy Woman"	A. Reynolds, McDill	3:20
6.	"No Use Running"		2:38
7.	"How Much Time Does It Take"		2:32
8.	"My Woman's Love"		3:13
9.	"Don't You Believe"		2:39
10.	"Amanda"	McDill	3:08

== Personnel ==
From the album liner notes:

- Don Williams - lead vocals, rhythm guitar
- Joe Allen - bass
- Kenny Malone - drums
- Jimmy Colvard, Reggie Young - electric guitar
- Buddy Spicher - fiddle
- Chuck Cochran - organ
- Bobby Wood, Chuck Cochran - piano
- Chip Young, Jimmy Colvard - rhythm guitar
- Lloyd Green - steel guitar
- Don Sheffield - trumpet
- The Joyful Noise - backing vocals
- Danny Flowers - harmonica

== Production ==
- Produced by Allen Reynolds
- Violin Arrangements by Chuck Cochran
