= We Should Be Together (album) =

Studio album by Crystal Gayle
- Released: June 19, 1979
- Genre: Country
- Length: 24:15
- Label: United Artists
- Producer: Allen Reynolds

Crystal Gayle chronology
When I Dream (1978)	We Should Be Together (1979)	Classic Crystal (1979)

Singles from We Should Be Together
- 1. "Your Kisses Will" Released: July 1979; 2. "Your Old Cold Shoulder" Released: November 1979

We Should Be Together is the sixth studio album by American country music singer Crystal Gayle. It was released on June 19, 1979. Like all of her previous albums for United Artists, Allen Reynolds produced. It peaked at No. 9 on the Billboard Country Albums chart, with two of its tracks reaching the Billboard Hot Country Singles chart: "Your Kisses Will" (No. 7) and "Your Old Cold Shoulder" (No. 5). The album title comes from the album's last song, written by Allen Reynolds, and which was previously a hit single for Don Williams in 1974.

Professional ratings
Review scores
Source	Rating
AllMusic	2.5/5 stars
Record Mirror	3/5 stars

== Track listing ==
No.	Title	Writer(s)	Length
1.	"Sneakin' Out the Back Door"	James Valentini, Frank Saulino	2:19
2.	"You'll Be Loved Someday"	Sandy Mason Theoret	2:41
3.	"Beyond You"	Bill Gatzimos, Crystal Gayle	2:38
4.	"You're the Best Thing in My Life"	Charley Sauls	2:41
5.	"Time Will Prove That I'm Right"	Harlan Howard	2:38
6.	"Your Kisses Will"	Van Stephenson	2:05
7.	"Your Old Cold Shoulder"	Richard Leigh	2:17
8.	"Through Believing in Love Songs"	Gatzimos, Gayle	2:39
9.	"Too Deep for Tears"	Leigh	2:11
10.	"We Should Be Together"	Allen Reynolds	3:06

== Personnel ==
- Crystal Gayle
- Chris Leuzinger, David Kirby, Jimmy Colvard, Ray Edenton, Rod Smarr, Sonny Curtis - guitar
- Lloyd Green - steel guitar
- Buddy Spicher - fiddle
- Bob Moore, Joe Allen, Spady Brannan - bass
- Bobby Wood, Dwight Scott, Hargus "Pig" Robbins - keyboards
- Charles Cochran - keyboards, string and horn arrangements
- Gene Chrisman, Jimmy Isbell, Kenny Malone, Steve Krawczyn - drums
- Dennis Good, Don Sheffield - horns
- Allen Reynolds, Garth Fundis - backing vocals
- The Shelly Kurland Strings - strings
