= Taylor Pie =

American singer-songwriter

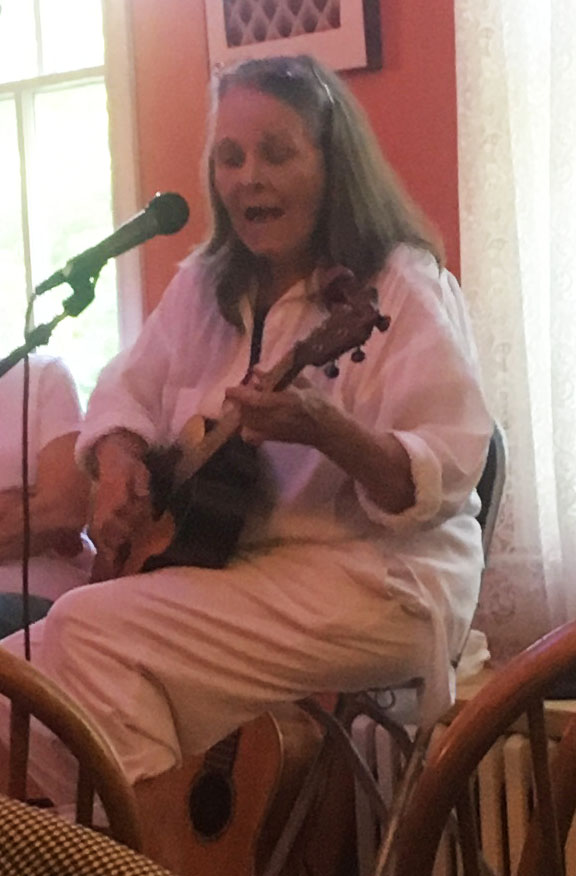
- Taylor Pie in June 25, 2016 house concert

Background information
- Also known as: Susan Taylor
- Born: 1947 (age 78–79); Jacksonville, Texas, United States
- Genres: Folk music, folk
- Occupation: Songwriter/Performer
- Instruments: Vocals, guitar, mandolin, baritone uke, lap slide guitar, harmonica, percussion
- Years active: 1964–present
- Label: PuffBunny Records
- Website: http://www.taylorpie.com

Taylor Pie (born 1947) is an American folk singer from Jacksonville, Texas, better known as Susan Taylor, a founding member of the Pozo-Seco Singers, whose recording of Michael Merchant's song "Time" topped the charts in Boston, Chicago, and Los Angeles. After the group disbanded, she helped launch the country music career of fellow Pozo, Don Williams. In the 1970s she formed a group called The City Country Band with Richard Frank in New York City, and Bette Midler used one of her songs, "Back in the Bars Again", in her Clams on the Half Shell Review. After moving to Stockbridge, Massachusetts, Susan took the name Taylor Pie as her professional handle and wrote "Full Grown Fool" with Allen Reynolds, which became a country hit for Mickey Gilley. "Just Like Angels," penned with Dickey Lee, was nominated for a gospel Dove Award. Tanya Tucker, The Oak Ridge Boys, Don Williams, The Forester Sisters, John Connely, Terri Hendrix, Valerie Smith, The Tuttles with AJ Lee, the Lewis Family, Cluster Pluckers, and others have recorded Pie songs. In 2015, Taylor was inducted into the National Traditional Country Music Assn Hall of Fame in Le Mars, Iowa. She is Director of A&R at PuffBunny Records and engaged in promoting a new type of performance art called Songswarm.

As of 2016, Pie actively writes, publishes, produces, and tours.

== Industry awards ==
- National Traditional Country Music Association voted Taylor Pie as one of their 2015 inductees into "America's Old Time Country Music Hall of Fame"
- Women of Substance "So Little Has Changed”, was added to the playlist on the Americana segment each week, Oct.-Dec. 2012

== Discography ==
A partial discography is available.
Examples:

- Shades of Time (1968) – Pozo Seco (Susan Taylor and Don Williams with Ron Shaw) - Columbia re-released (2013) Real Gone Music with 11 bonus tracks
- Finally Getting Home (1972) – Susan Taylor – JMI Records
- Crying in the Rain (1975) – Susan Taylor – Private Stock Records 45 RPM single
- Long Ride Home (2003) – Taylor Pie – Pecan Pie Music
- Jubal (2005) – Taylor Pie – Pecan Pie Music
- So Little Has Changed (2007) – Taylor Pie – PuffBunny Records
- LIVE at Hondo's (2009) – Taylor Pie with Eben Wood – PuffBunny Records
- Taylor Pie aka Susan Taylor Finally Getting Home (2012) – Re-release of JMI – PuffBunny Records
