= Pozo-Seco Singers =

American folk music group (1965–1970)

- Origin: Corpus Christi, Texas, U.S.
- Genres: American folk
- Years active: 1965–1970
- Labels: Columbia, Certron Records
- Past members: Don Williams; Lofton Kline; Susan Taylor (Taylor Pie); Ron Shaw; Russell Thornberry

The Pozo-Seco Singers was an American folk music group which had success during the 1960s. They recorded the hit "Time" and launched the music career of Don Williams.

== History ==
=== Formation ===
In the early 1960s, Don Williams and Lofton Kline performed together in the Corpus Christi area as a duo called The Strangers Two. At the same time, Susan Taylor was a student at W.B. Ray High School in Corpus Christi who had performed with a group of musicians, the Corpus Christi Folk Music Society. She began a musical association with a student, Michael Merchant. In the fall of 1964, Merchant went to college, leaving Taylor behind to start her senior year of high school. Taylor met Williams and Kline when the two performed at a hootenanny at Del Mar College in the city. Learning that they had compatible musical tastes and harmonized well, they decided to form a trio. Inspired by an oil field term denoting a dead well (Taylor's then-boyfriend was a geologist), they called themselves the "Pozo-Seco Singers." During Christmas break in 1964, Merchant returned home and introduced the newly formed trio to a song he had recently written, called "Time." The group cut the track on a local record label, Edmark Records. Featuring wistful vocals by Taylor, the record became a regional hit in the San Antonio market and then across Texas.

=== Columbia Records ===
Columbia Records signed the three and released the song nationally, peaking at #47 on the Hot 100 charts in April 1966. More impressively, "Time" peaked at #3 on Billboard's Easy Listening chart. In Canada, "Time" reached #9 on the pop charts, and was #1 for 3 weeks on the AC charts. A second single, "I'll Be Gone", (also penned by Merchant with lead vocals by Taylor) stalled at #92 on the Hot 100 and #34 on the Easy Listening chart two months later. Both tracks were included on the group's debut album, Time, which was released in the summer of 1966 and peaked at #127 on the Billboard 200.

The well-received Time album and singles paved the way for even more commercial success for the group. In August 1966, the Pozo-Seco Singers debuted their new single, "I Can Make it with You, a ballad written by Chip Taylor. Although Jackie DeShannon released a competing version of this song at the same time, the Pozo-Seco Singers' version, with Williams on lead vocals, quickly became the more popular offering, peaking at #32 in October 1966, becoming the group's first Top 40 hit. (DeShannon's version went to #68.) In Canada, "I Can Make It With You" reached #21. In December, Columbia launched their new single, "Look What You've Done," along with their second album, I Can Make It With You. "Look What You've Done," with Williams and Taylor sharing lead vocals, reached #32-just as its predecessor single had done-on the Hot 100 in February 1967, and #33 in Canada. On the strength of two Top 40 hits, I Can Make It With You reached as high as #81 on the Billboard 200 in the spring of 1967.

Kline left the group after I Can Make It With You was recorded, due to friction with the group's producer Bob Johnston and being tired of constant touring. Kline was replaced by veteran folk singer Ron Shaw, who toured with the group and recorded several singles with them following I Can Make It With You. One of the songs Shaw introduced to the group was "I Believed It All," which instantly became popular in concert. The trio wanted to record it as a single, but Johnston vetoed the idea and released it as the B-side of another song Johnston had written and had them cut, called "Excuse Me, Dear Martha." "Excuse Me, Dear Martha" did not go higher than #102 on the singles charts in March 1967. Some disc jockeys began flipping the single to play the group's preferred track, "I Believed It All." Lacking any promotion, "I Believed It All" peaked at #96 in May 1967. Despite the hurdles it faced, it became a surprise hit on the Billboard Easy Listening chart, reaching as high as #8 in the spring of 1967. The group recorded several additional singles in 1967, including "Morning Dew" (b/w "It's Alright") and "Louisiana Man" (b/w "Tomorrow Proper"). "Louisiana Man" somehow managed to briefly nuzzle its way into the Hot 100 charts at #97 in September 1967.

In 1968, the group released its third album, Shades Of Time, under the name "Pozo Seco." Having tired of their creative differences with Johnston, the group recorded the album under producer Elliot Mazer. By this time, Pozo Seco had been reduced to a duo consisting of Taylor and Williams, backed by a Canadian band called The Paupers. Columbia made few efforts to promote either the album or its lead-off single, "The Renegade," and neither charted. The duo made additional recordings with producer Billy Sherrill, and although several singles resulted from those sessions in 1969, none made a commercial impact.

=== Certron Records ===
Taylor and Williams left Columbia in the fall of 1969, having grown impatient with the label's failure to properly promote their material. They signed with a smaller label, Certron Records and released their fourth album, Spend Some Time With Me, in early 1970. It was a characteristically strong offering, but the album failed to chart. Taylor later remembered that the album was also the victim of poor timing, as the Kent State shootings in May 1970 took the air out of the folk movement. With the duo reduced to playing in increasingly small venues, they decided to part ways. Even though the group was defunct, Pozo Seco managed a final hit in November 1970, when its medley of The Beatles' "Strawberry Fields" and "Something" briefly appeared on the Bubbling Under chart.

=== Post group careers ===
Taylor recorded a solo album in 1972 and focused on songwriting for JMI Music. A successful songwriter, later going by the name "Taylor Pie," her songs were recorded by artists including Tanya Tucker, The Lewis Family, John Conlee, The Forester Sisters, Mickey Gilley, and Bette Midler. Shaw, with his brother Rick, helped form the popular folk group The Hillside Singers, famous for their song, "I'd Like To Teach the World To Sing." Don Williams went on to have a successful solo career in country music. Some of his early country singles on JMI Records were produced with Taylor's help.

In 2021, director Elizabeth Ahlstrom released the documentary Nobody Famous, featuring the story of the Pozo-Seco Singers.

== Discography ==
- Time (Columbia Records, 1966) US #127
- I Can Make it With You (Columbia, 1967) US #81
- Shades of Time (Columbia, 1968)
- Spend Some Time With Me (Certron, 1970)

== Singles ==
- "Time" (1966) U.S. Pop #47, U.S. Easy Listening #3, Can. #9
- "I'll Be Gone" (1966) U.S. Pop #92, U.S. Easy Listening #34.
- "I Can Make It With You" (1966) U.S. Pop #32, Can. #21
- "Almost Persuaded" (1967)
- "Look What You've Done" (1967) U.S. Pop #32, Can. #33
- "Morning Dew" (1967) U.S.
- "I Believed It All" (1967) U.S. Pop #96, U.S. Easy Listening #8.
- "Excuse Me Dear Martha" (1967) U.S. #102
- "Louisiana Man" (1967) U.S. Pop #97
- "Creole Woman" (1968)
- "Comin' Apart" (1970)
- "Strawberry Fields/Something" (1970) U.S. Pop #115
