= I Recall a Gypsy Woman =

"I Recall a Gypsy Woman" is a song written by Bob McDill and Allen Reynolds, and originally recorded by Don Williams in 1973. In 1976, at the height of the country and western boom in Britain, his version charted at number 13 on the UK Singles Chart, the best position for Williams on this chart.

The song was previously the B-side of Williams' 1973 single "Atta Way to Go", which peaked at number 13 on the Hot Country Songs chart in 1973.

== Cover versions ==
In 1973 country singer Tommy Cash released a cover as a non-album release. It reached number 16 on the US Billboard Country chart.

In 1975 Waylon Jennings covered it in his album Dreaming My Dreams.

In 1977 Doc Watson interpreted the song with his version being the opening track of the album Lonesome Road jointly released by Doc Watson and guitarist Merle Watson. Also in 1977 Berni Flint covered the song on his 1977 album I Don't Want to Put a Hold On You.

In 1981 B. J. Thomas covered it in his covers album Some Love Songs Never Die. The album was produced by Larry Butler.

In 2007 Chuck Prophet covered it on his album Dreaming Waylon's Dream, a track-by-track covers album of Waylon's Dreaming My Dream.

It has also been covered by South African singer Ricus Nel.
