= JMI Records =

American record label

- Founded: 1971; 54 years ago (as J-M-I Records)
- Founder: Jack Clement
- Distributor: Independent
- Genre: Various
- Country of origin: United States
- Location: Nashville, Tennessee, U.S.

JMI Records (Jack Music International) was an American record label founded in 1971 by Jack Clement, and was primarily active until 1974, when the catalog was sold to ABC-Dot Records. It was notable for having been the record label that first signed several country music singers and songwriters that would come to dominate the American country music charts of the 1970s, including singer Don Williams, and songwriters Bob McDill and Allen Reynolds.

== History ==
=== Background (1964-1971) ===
Jack Clement was an American singer, songwriter and record producer active between 1954-2013. Clement rose to prominence in the country music scene in the 1950s and 1970s collaborating with such stars as Johnny Cash, Charley Pride, Bobby Bare, Jerry Lee Lewis, Waylon Jennings and Ray Charles. His success allowed him to build his own state of the art recording studio in Nashville, Tennessee in the mid-1960s, and eventually he was able to fulfill his ambition of having his own recording label, J-M-I Records, in 1971.

=== Active Years (1971-1974) ===
At the record labels' inception, the goal was to create an atmosphere centered around the inventive talents of a variety of highly skilled Nashville studio musicians and songwriters. In the distribution announcement for the new company, it was noted that the releases would not be marketed under any specific categories. This meant that artists would be free to record whatever styles they wanted, regardless of how the recordings would fit into the existing commercial formats of the early 1970s country music scene.

The first two albums released on the record label were "Short Stories" by Bob McDill and "Finally Getting Home" by Susan Taylor (formerly of the Pozo Seco Singers) in 1972.

Allen Reynolds was brought on as vice-president from the outset, and he can be credited with bringing on Don Williams to J-M-I records in 1972. The labels initial offerings were considered more modern fare by the commercial press, and Williams' first single, released in the summer of 1972, became the first official "country music" release by the label. Williams released his first two albums with J-M-I, but moved to ABC-Dot Records when that company purchased J-M-I's catalog.

Big Ken Smith of Tennessee Pulleybone spoke of the demise of J-M-I Records in a 2002 interview:

'"Our single, “The Door's Always Open,” did well. It was #1 in all the major markets, but never at the same time because JMI didn’t have the distribution. Our 3rd single got some airplay, but it didn’t get the airplay that “The Door's Always Open” did. Right after that, JMI folded because without distribution, it’s tough. Allen Reynolds, who was at JMI at the time, was going to go do a distribution deal with one of the big labels, but it never panned out."

== Contributions ==
Partial List of Artists that have recorded and worked with J-M-I Records:

- Bob McDill
- Susan Taylor
- Allen Reynolds
- Tennessee Pulleybone
- Don Williams

== Discography ==
Partial list of recordings known to have been released on J-M-I Records, including artist, release name and year.

Albums
Artist	Release	Year	Ref.
Bob McDill	"Short Stories"	1972	
Susan Taylor	"Finally Getting Home"	1972	
Don Williams	"Don Williams Volume One"	1973	
Don Williams	"Don Williams Volume Two"	1974	

Singles
Artist	Release	Year	Ref.
Tennessee Pullybone	"The Door Is Always Open"	1973	
Don Williams	"The Shelter Of Your Eyes"	1973	
Don Williams	"Come Early Morning"	1973	
Don Williams	"Atta Way to Go"	1973	

== See also ==
- "We Must Believe in Magic" (song), the JMI Records "company song"
