= Johnny Russell (singer) =

American country music singer-songwriter (1940–2001)

- Born: John Bright Russell; January 23, 1940; Moorhead, Mississippi, U.S.
- Died: July 3, 2001 (aged 61) Nashville, Tennessee, U.S.
- Genres: Country
- Occupation: Singer-songwriter
- Instrument: Guitar
- Years active: 1965–2000

John Bright Russell (January 23, 1940 – July 3, 2001) was an American country music singer, songwriter, and comedian best known for his song "Act Naturally", which was made famous by Buck Owens, who recorded it in 1963, and The Beatles in 1965. His songs have been recorded by Gene Watson, Burl Ives, Jim Reeves, Jerry Garcia, Dolly Parton, Emmylou Harris, Loretta Lynn, and Linda Ronstadt.

== Biography ==
Born in Moorhead, Mississippi, United States, he moved with his family at age 11 to Fresno, California. He began writing songs and entering talent contests while still attending Fresno High School, from which he graduated in 1958. He had his first song published that year, "In a Mansion Stands My Love," which was recorded by Jim Reeves as the B side of his 1960 hit, "He'll Have to Go."

Russell's recording of the song "Rednecks, White Socks and Blue Ribbon Beer" was his only top 10 hit, peaking at No. 4 on the Billboard Hot Country Singles chart in October 1973. The song was nominated later that year for a Grammy Award. Russell is also known for the songs "The Baptism of Jesse Taylor", "Catfish John", and "Hello, I Love You".

Years later, George Strait topped the Billboard Hot Country Songs chart with Russell's song "Let's Fall to Pieces Together".

In 1987, Russell hosted his first annual concert in Moorhead, at the Mississippi Delta Community College Coliseum. These went on for 13 years, his final on April 29, 2000.

By 2001, Russell's health had been in a state of decline (for years, he had used his obesity as a running joke on the Grand Ole Opry), and in April 2001, both of his legs were amputated because of diabetes. Russell died July 3, 2001, in Nashville, Tennessee, at the age of 61 from diabetes-related complications.

== Discography ==
=== Albums ===
| Year | Album | US Country | Label |
|---|---|---|---|
| 1971 | Mr. and Mrs. Untrue | — | RCA Victor |
| 1973 | Catfish John / Chained | 32 | RCA Victor |
| 1973 | Rednecks, White Socks and Blue Ribbon Beer | 19 | RCA Victor |
| 1974 | She's in Love with a Rodeo Man | — | RCA Victor |
| 1975 | Here Comes Johnny Russell | 45 | RCA Victor |
| 1979 | Perspectives | — | Mercury |

=== Singles ===
| Year | Single | Chart Positions | | Album |
| Year | Single | US Country | CAN Country | Album |
|---|---|---|---|---|
| 1971 | "Open Up the Door to Your Heart" | — | — | single only |
| 1971 | "Mr. and Mrs. Untrue" | 64 | — | Mr. and Mrs. Untrue |
| 1972 | "What a Price" | 57 | — | Catfish John / Chained |
| 1972 | "Mr. Fiddle Man" | 59 | — | Catfish John / Chained |
| 1972 | "Rain Falling On Me" | 36 | — | Catfish John / Chained |
| 1972 | "Catfish John" | 12 | 3 | Catfish John / Chained |
| 1973 | "Chained" | 31 | 35 | Catfish John / Chained |
| 1973 | "Rednecks, White Socks and Blue Ribbon Beer" | 4 | 1 | Rednecks, White Socks and Blue Ribbon Beer |
| 1973 | "The Baptism of Jesse Taylor" | 14 | 21 | Rednecks, White Socks and Blue Ribbon Beer |
| 1974 | "She's in Love with a Rodeo Man" | 39 | — | She's in Love with a Rodeo Man |
| 1974 | "She Burnt the Little Roadside Tavern Down" | 38 | 42 | She's in Love with a Rodeo Man |
| 1975 | "That's How My Baby Builds a Fire" | 23 | 32 | Here Comes Johnny Russell |
| 1975 | "Hello I Love You" | 13 | 29 | Here Comes Johnny Russell |
| 1975 | "Our Marriage Was a Failure" | 45 | — | Here Comes Johnny Russell |
| 1976 | "I'm a Trucker" | 57 | — | Here Comes Johnny Russell |
| 1976 | "This Man and Woman Thing" | 45 | — | singles only |
| 1977 | "The Son of Hickory Holler's Tramp" | 32 | 36 | singles only |
| 1977 | "I Wonder How She's Doing Now" | flip | — | singles only |
| 1977 | "Obscene Phone Call" | 91 | — | singles only |
| 1978 | "Leona" | 64 | — | singles only |
| 1978 | "You'll Be Back (Every Night in My Dreams)" | 24 | — | Perspectives |
| 1978 | "How Deep in Love Am I?" | 29 | — | Perspectives |
| 1979 | "I Might Be Awhile in New Orleans" | 57 | — | Perspectives |
| 1979 | "Ain't No Way to Make a Bad Love Grow" | 56 | — | singles only |
| 1980 | "While the Choir Sang the Hymn (I Thought of Her)" | 57 | — | singles only |
| 1980 | "We're Back in Love Again" | 59 | — | singles only |
| 1981 | "Song of the South" | 57 | — | singles only |
| 1981 | "Here's to the Horses" | 49 | — | singles only |
| 1982 | "George" | — | — | singles only |
| 1987 | "Butterbeans" (w/ Little David Wilkins) | 72 | — | singles only |
| 1987 | "It's Quittin' Time" (w/ Little David Wilkins) | — | — | singles only |

== Bibliography ==
- Roy, Don. (1998). "Johnny Russell." In The Encyclopedia of Country Music. Paul Kingsbury, Ed. New York: Oxford University Press. pp. 462–463.
