= Jack Clement =

American singer-songwriter and record producer (1934–2013)

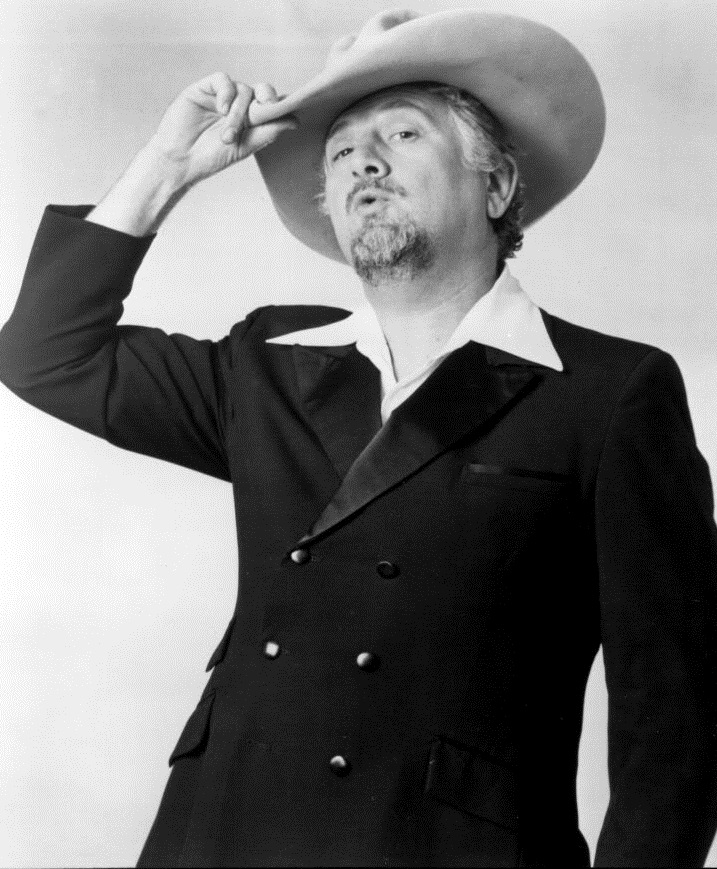
- Clement in 1978

Background information
- Also known as: "Cowboy" Jack Clement
- Born: Jack Henderson Clement; April 5, 1931; Memphis, Tennessee, U.S.
- Died: August 8, 2013 (aged 82) Nashville, Tennessee, U.S.
- Genres: Rock and roll, country, folk, rockabilly
- Occupations: Singer, songwriter, record producer
- Years active: 1953–2013
- Labels: Sun, RCA, JMI Records, Mercury Records

Jack Henderson Clement (April 5, 1931 – August 8, 2013) was an American musician, songwriter, record producer, film producer, and music executive.

He was producer and engineer for Sam Phillips at Sun Records in its early days, discovering Jerry Lee Lewis and recording the "Million Dollar Quartet" session with Lewis, Carl Perkins, Elvis Presley, and Johnny Cash.

Clement played a key role in launching the career of Charley Pride, writing several of Pride's biggest hit songs and producing 20 albums for the singer. Clement was inducted into the Nashville Songwriters Hall of Fame, Rockabilly Hall of Fame, Memphis Music Hall of Fame, and Music City Walk of Fame.

== Biography ==
=== Early life ===
Clement was born on April 5, 1931, in the Whitehaven neighborhood of Memphis, Tennessee. He grew up and went to school in Memphis, learned guitar, and was performing at an early age, playing guitar and dobro. In 1946 at the age of 15, he ran away from home. In 1948, prior to pursuing a career in music, he commenced his service in the United States Marine Corps. While serving in Washington, DC, Clement, fiddler Scotty Stoneman, and mandolinist Buzz Busby formed the Tennessee Troupers, a bluegrass band. In 1953, he made his first record for Sheraton Records in Boston. From 1953 to 1955, he studied at Memphis State University, where he gained the nickname "Cowboy". During his student days, he played steel guitar with a local band, and he co-founded Fernwood Publishing Company with bandmate Slim Wallace in 1954.

Clement's band recorded a demonstration in a home studio that Clement had built in his garage, and he took the record to Sun Records to be mastered. Upon hearing the demo, Sam Philips wanted to meet and talk to Clement, and on June 15, 1956, Phillips hired Clement as a recording engineer and producer for Sun Records.

=== Career ===
At Sun Records, Clement began working with acts including Billy Lee Riley, before eventually working with Sun artists Roy Orbison, Carl Perkins, and Johnny Cash. He discovered and recorded Jerry Lee Lewis while Phillips was on a trip to Florida, with one of those recordings, "Whole Lotta Shakin' Goin' On", selected in 2005 for permanent preservation in the National Recording Registry at the Library of Congress. Clement was also the recording engineer present at Sun Studio during the famous December 4, 1956, "Million Dollar Quartet" session involving Cash, Lewis, Perkins, and Elvis Presley. He made the decision to record the impromptu session.

In 1957, Clement wrote Johnny Cash's crossover hit "Ballad of a Teenage Queen", and "Guess Things Happen That Way", which was number one on the country chart and number 11 on the pop chart for Cash the following year. The next year, Cash scored another hit with the Clement-penned "Guess Things Happen That Way". During this time in Memphis, Clement also wrote "It'll Be Me", recorded by Jerry Lee Lewis in 1957 and covered by Cliff Richard and the Shadows in 1962. In 1958, Clement released the single "Ten Years", it reached No. 24 on Cashbox's Country Singles Chart. It was later covered by Johnny Western (1959), Rex Allen (1962), and Roger Mews.

In 1959, he was hired by Chet Atkins to work as a producer at RCA Victor in Nashville, where he worked for the next year and a half, producing albums for Del Wood and others. In 1960, Jim Reeves had a top-10 country hit with Clement's song "I Know One".

In 1961, producer and publisher Bill Hall persuaded Clement to move to Beaumont, Texas. Together, Hall and Clement founded the Hall-Clement Publishing Company and Gulf Coast Recording Studios, where Dickey Lee recorded the top-10 hit "Patches". During this time, Clement worked with songwriters Allen Reynolds and Bob McDill, and persuaded George Jones to record Lee's song "She Thinks I Still Care", as well as Clement's own song "A Girl I Used to Know". The latter was later recorded by Porter Wagoner and Dolly Parton (as "Just Someone I Used to Know"), and has gone on to become a country music standard. Clement continued to work in Nashville, and contributed arranging, guitar playing, and production on Cash's number-one hit, "Ring of Fire" in 1963. In Beaumont, Clement also worked with artists including Moon Mullican and Joe Tex.

Clement returned to Nashville in 1965 and became a significant figure in the country music business, and attracting enough music industry professionals to the area that he was called the "Pied Piper of Nashville". He wrote the comedic "The One on the Right Is on the Left", which was a number-two country and number 46 pop hit for Johnny Cash in 1966. In 1968, he produced albums for Townes Van Zandt.

Clement was instrumental in launching the career of Charley Pride by producing a demonstration tape and playing it for RCA Records executive Chet Atkins, resulting in Pride's being offered a recording contract. Clement wrote and produced "Just Between You and Me" and "I Know One", which became Pride's first two major hits. Clement produced 20 albums for Pride over a six-and-a-half-year stretch,

He founded a music publishing business and established multiple recording studios, including Jack's Tracks on Music Row, and the Jack Clement Recording Studio on Belmont Boulevard, where Ray Stevens recorded "Everything Is Beautiful", which became one of the most successful records of 1969. In 1971 he co-founded Jack's Music Inc. (JMI), which launched the career of Don Williams.

He resumed producing records and writing songs for Johnny Cash, and produced records and wrote songs for The Stonemans and Tompall & the Glaser Brothers.

Songs written by Clement were recorded by singing stars such as Johnny Cash, Dolly Parton, Ray Charles, Carl Perkins, Bobby Bare, Elvis Presley, Jim Reeves, Jerry Lee Lewis, Cliff Richard, Charley Pride, Tom Jones, Dickey Lee, Moon Mullican and Hank Snow, Garth Brooks, John Prine, Foghat, Roy Orbison, and many more. He was inducted into the Nashville Songwriters Hall of Fame in 1973. The same year, Bill Hall took control of Hall-Clement, selling it to the Welk Music Group two years later.

In 1974, Clement sold the Jack Clement Recording Studios to producer Larry Butler and Al Mifflin, and established a recording studio in his home, which he named the Cowboy Arms Hotel and Recording Spa. Clement also produced many key recordings by Waylon Jennings, Johnny Cash, John Hartford, Doc Watson, Sheb Wooley, Louis Armstrong, Frankie Yankovic, Eddy Arnold, and many more.

Clement was involved in a few film projects as a singer or songwriter of soundtracks. He produced and part-financed the 1975 horror film, Dear Dead Delilah, which was a financial disaster and the last film performance by the actress Agnes Moorehead.

In 1978, Clement released a solo album, All I Want to Do in Life, which generated three charting country singles.

In 1987, Clement was approached by Irish rock band U2 to record at Sun Studio in Memphis. He was not familiar with the band's music, but agreed to arrange the session. The resulting work appeared on U2's next album, Rattle and Hum, ("When Love Comes to Town", with B.B. King; "Angel of Harlem", a tribute to Billie Holiday; and "Love Rescue Me", with backing vocals by Bob Dylan), as well as the Woody Guthrie song "Jesus Christ", which was included on the 1988 album Folkways: A Vision Shared — A Tribute to Woody Guthrie & Leadbelly. Extracts from the sessions appeared in the 1988 film Rattle and Hum.

=== Later life and death ===
In November 2003, Clement performed his song made famous by Johnny Cash, "Guess Things Happen That Way", on CMT's Johnny Cash Memorial Tribute concert TV special.

He recorded a second solo album, Guess Things Happen That Way, in 2004. His documentary, Cowboy Jack's Home Movies was named Best Documentary at the 2005 Nashville Film Festival. In 2005, a documentary about Clement, Shakespeare Was a Big George Jones Fan, was created by Robert Gordon and Morgan Neville. It was pieced together from Clement's home videos and interviews with peers, including Jerry Lee Lewis and Bono, and released on DVD in 2007.

Clement hosted a weekly program on Sirius XM's Outlaw Country channel.

He was inducted into the Rockabilly Hall of Fame, the Memphis Music Hall of Fame and the Music City Walk of Fame.

On June 25, 2011, a fire destroyed his home and studio on Belmont Boulevard in Nashville. Clement was unhurt, but many priceless recordings and memorabilia were lost. On April 10, 2013, it was announced he would be inducted into the Country Music Hall of Fame.

Clement died at his home in Nashville on August 8, 2013. He had suffered from liver cancer. He had a daughter, Alison, also a singer and writer; and a son, Niles, an engineer and photographer.

== Personal life ==
Clement married Sharon L. Johnson in the late 1950s, the younger sister of country musician Jessi Colter. They would later divorce.

Awards
Preceded by John Prine	AMA Lifetime Achievement Award for Songwriting; 2004	Succeeded by Guy Clark
