= Bob McDill =

American songwriter

- Born: Robert Lee McDill; April 4, 1944 (age 82)
- Origin: Beaumont, Texas, U.S.
- Genres: Country/Popular
- Occupation: Songwriter
- Years active: 1967–2000

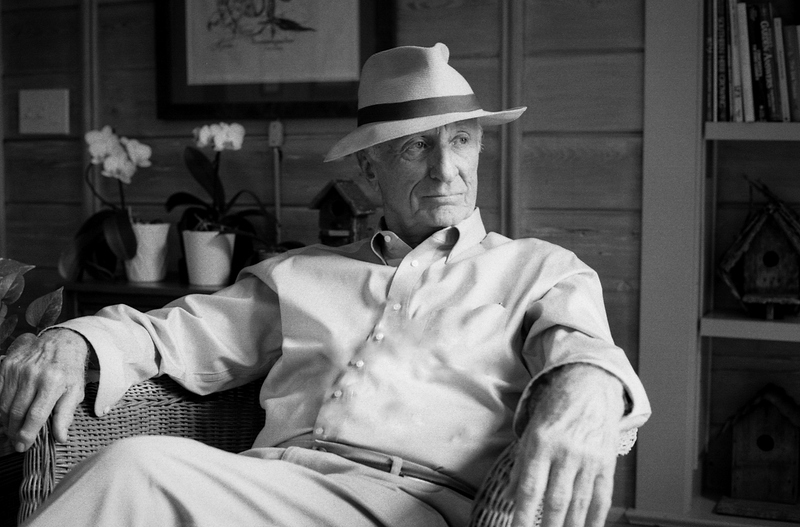
Photo by Jackie Chancey

Robert Lee McDill (born April 5, 1944) is a retired American songwriter, active from the 1960s until 2000. During his career he wrote or co-wrote 31 number one country hits. His songs were also recorded by popular artists of the 1970s, 1980s and 1990s, including The Grateful Dead, Ray Charles, Joe Cocker, Anne Murray, and B. J. Thomas. His music credits in film include Primary Colors, The Thing Called Love, Texasville, and the documentary Grizzly Man. In addition to four Grammy nominations McDill received Songwriter of the Year awards from Broadcast Music Incorporated, the American Society of Composers, Authors and Publishers, and the Nashville Songwriters Association International. In October 2012, McDill was awarded ASCAP's Golden Note Award in recognition of his "extraordinary place in American popular music." In September 2015 he received the Academy of Country Music's Poet's Award for lifetime achievement. In October 2023 he was inducted into the Country Music Hall of Fame. He is the author of numerous articles as well as two books: Tales of the Old River Rod and Gun, Bloody Mary Society and Gentleman's Club and The Ancestors and Descendants of Robert Nathanial McDill.

McDill was inducted into the Country Music Hall of Fame in October 2023.

== Early years ==
Bob McDill was born Robert Lee McDill in Beaumont, Texas, and grew up in Walden (near Beaumont). As a child he sang hymns with his family around the piano on Sunday afternoons. His music education began with viola lessons in the 4th grade. From 1962 until 1966 he studied English at Lamar University, while playing in a band called The Newcomers.

While serving in the Navy, McDill corresponded with songwriter and record producer Allen Reynolds, and songwriter Dickey Lee. They helped McDill land his first chart record as a songwriter, "The Happy Man," recorded in 1967 by Perry Como. A year later, Sam the Sham and the Pharaohs provided McDill with his second success when they recorded "Black Sheep."

After the Navy, he joined Lee and Reynolds in Memphis, Tennessee. In 1970, the three of them moved on to Nashville. There they joined music publisher and producer Jack Clement.

Jack Clement's JMI Records released a solo album of McDill's in 1972, called Short Stories. It featured many of McDill's compositions, including "Come Early Morning" and "Catfish John." The album brought attention to his songwriting. "Catfish John" was also recorded the same year by Johnny Russell, becoming a top 20 Billboard Chart hit. "Come Early Morning" was released in 1973 as a single from Don Williams' debut album; it became a top 20 country hit. In the ensuing years Williams recorded nunerous McDill songs.

In 1976 he contributed multiple songs to Crystal Gayles' Crystal album, including her country hit "You Never Miss a Real Good Thing ('Til He Says Goodbye)." Bobby Bare recorded an entire album of Bob McDill songs in 1977 titled Me and McDill.

In the early 1980s, Grammy-winning pop singer Juice Newton released four McDill songs: "I'm Dancing As Fast As I Can," "Shot Full of Love," "Runaway Hearts" and "Falling in Love;" the songs appeared on Gold and Platinum certified albums. "Everything That Glitters (Is Not Gold)," which charted number one for Dan Seals in 1986, was co-written by McDill. ("Don't Close Your Eyes" was recorded by Keith Whitley, reaching #1 in August 1988, and was covered by Kellie Pickler and Alan Jackson. Two of Mel McDaniel's biggest hits, “Louisiana Saturday Night” and “Baby's Got Her Blue Jeans On,” were McDill compositions. McDill also co-wrote a song called "Someone Like You" with Dickey Lee, which can be heard on Emmylou Harris' album Profile II. He continued to write songs into the 1990s, including "Gone Country" by Alan Jackson, "All the Good Ones Are Gone" by Pam Tillis (which received a Grammy Award nomination in 1998), and "Why Didn't I Think of That" by Doug Stone.

== Legacy ==
McDill retired from songwriting in 2000. In September 2015, McDill received the Academy of Country Music's Poet's Award for lifetime achievement. In 2017, he donated all of his awards, recordings, photos, manuscripts and notes from the breadth of his career to the Country Music Hall of Fame.

Nobel Laureate Sir V. S. Naipaul's travelogue A Turn in the South written in 1989 features a section about Bob McDill. Naipaul, who was often acerbic, described McDill's song writing in a thoughtful portrait and liberally quoted from McDill's song "Good Ole Boys Like Me."

== Discography ==
- Short Stories (1972)
