= Allen Reynolds =

American record producer and songwriter (born 1938)

- Born: August 18, 1938 (age 88); North Little Rock, Arkansas
- Origin: United States
- Genre: Country
- Occupations: Record producer, songwriter
- Years active: 1962–present
- Labels: JMI, UA

Allen Reynolds (born August 18, 1938) is an American record producer and songwriter who specializes in country music. He has been inducted into the Nashville Songwriters Hall of Fame and the Musicians Hall of Fame and Museum.

== Biography ==
=== Early life and career ===
Reynolds was born in North Little Rock, Arkansas, and grew up in Memphis, Tennessee. He started writing songs during his college years and eventually teamed up with Dickey Lee to form their own publishing and production company. They had a minor regional hit with the song "Dream Boy."

In the early 1960s, Reynolds most notably wrote the 1965 pop hit "Five O'Clock World" for the Vogues. Reynolds worked at Sun Records in Memphis, and he became good friends with Jack Clement, a leading producer and songwriter at the label.

=== Commercial success ===
In the early 1970s, Reynolds' friend, producer and writer Jack Clement, left Memphis to start his own publishing company and record label in Nashville, JMI Records. Clement convinced Reynolds to sign on as vice-president. Reynolds built a roster of talented writers at the label, including Bob McDill (writer of the country standard "Amanda") and Don Williams. Reynolds went on to write and produce on Williams' first two albums, and was instrumental in helping Williams to launch his career.

When JMI Records closed in 1975, Reynolds continued to actively write and produce around Nashville, including Waylon Jennings' "Dreaming My Dreams with You." However, he achieved his greatest commercial success during this time working as writer and producer for Crystal Gayle. Some of their notable collaborations included "Wrong Road Again," "Somebody Loves You" and "Ready For the Times to Get Better." When Gayle left Decca Records in 1975, she signed with UA Records where she was teamed up with Reynolds, and he is credited with developing her signature soft rock sound.

=== Later career ===
Allen Reynolds' songs have left a lasting legacy on the country music scene. Hal Ketchum covered the 1960s hit "Five O'Clock World" on his 1991 debut album Past the Point of Rescue, with Reynolds as co-producer alongside Jim Rooney, which became a Top 20 country single for Ketchum.

Reynolds has kept busy in the music industry working as a noted record producer. Reynolds produced many of Garth Brooks's hit albums. He has also produced albums for Kathy Mattea, Hal Ketchum, Emmylou Harris, George Hamilton IV and the O'Kanes.

== Jack's Tracks recording studio ==
In 1975, Reynolds purchased Jack's Tracks recording studio from Jack Clement for $65,000, and produced many albums there, including many of Garth Brooks' albums. In 2010, Reynolds sold the studio to Brooks. In 2012, in honor of his 50th birthday, Brooks renamed the studio Allentown.

== Compositions ==
Title	Co-writer(s)	Year	Artist	Album	Chart	Ref.
"I Saw Linda Yesterday"	Dickey Lee	1962	Dickey Lee			
"Five O'Clock World"		1965	The Vogues			
"Her and Him"	Dickey Lee	1965	Bruce and Carroll			
"Medicine Man"	Mitt Addington	1965	Sam The Sham and the Pharaohs			
"He's Not Your Friend"	Dickey Lee	1966	Dee Jay and the Runnaways			
"I Sowed Love and Reaped Heartache"	Dickey Lee	1968	James Carr			
"Everybody's Reaching Out For Someone"	Dickey Lee	1971	Dickey Lee			
"Catfish John"	Bob McDill	1972	Bob McDill	Short Stories		
"Stainless Steel"	Bob McDill	1972	Bob McDill	Short Stories		
"Too Late To Turn Back Now"	Don Williams	1973	Don Williams	Don Williams Volume One		
"I Recall a Gypsy Woman"	Don Williams, Bob McDill	1973	Don Williams	Don Williams Volume One		
"Loving You So Long"		1974	Don Williams	Don Williams Volume Two		
"It Amazes Me"	Wayland Holyfield	1974	Charley Pride			
"Before I'm Fool Enough"		1974	Mary Kay James			
"We Should Be Together"		1974	Don Williams	Don Williams Volume Two		
"Dreaming My Dreams with You"		1975	Waylon Jennings	Dreaming My Dreams		
"My Ship Will Sail"		1975	Mary Kay James			
"Loving You So Long Now"		1975	Crystal Gayle	Crystal Gayle		
"Wrong Road Again"		1975	Crystal Gayle	Crystal Gayle		
"Somebody Loves You"		1975	Crystal Gayle	Somebody Loves You		
"All I Wanna Do in Life"	Sandy Mason	1976	Chip Hawkes			
"Ready for the Times to Get Better"		1976	Crystal Gayle	Crystal		
"We Must Believe In Magic"	Bob McDill	1977	Crystal Gayle	We Must Believe In Magic		
"Trail of Tears"	Roger Cook	1982				
"Coming to the Dance"	Charles Cochran	1985	Crystal Gayle	Nobody Wants to Be Alone		
