= Billy Dean discography =

Discography of American country singer Billy Dean

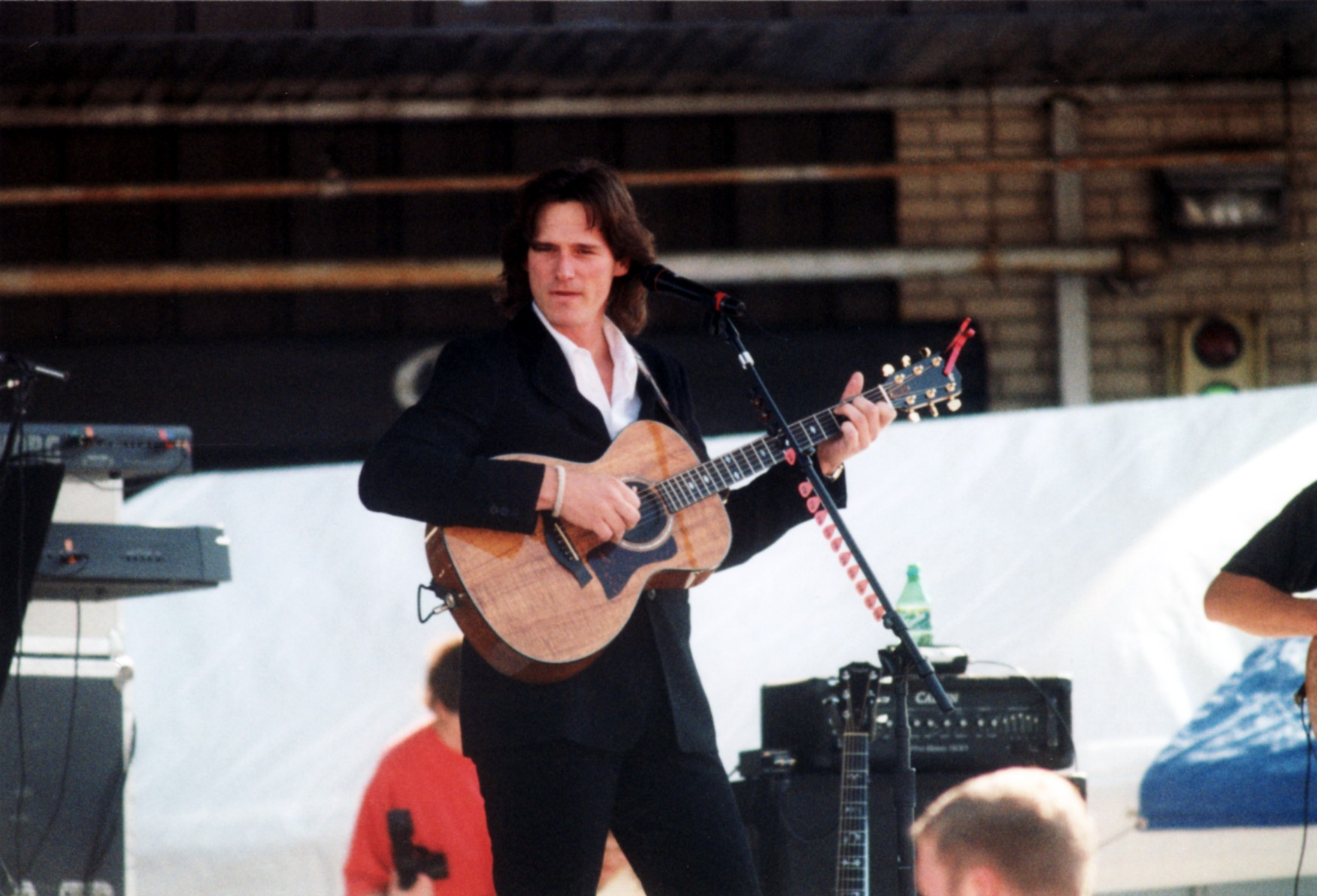
- Dean performing in 1998
- Studio albums: 11
- Compilation albums: 5
- Singles: 28
- Music videos: 16
- No.1 Single: 3

Billy Dean is an American country music artist. His discography comprises eleven studio albums, five compilation albums, 28 singles, and three guest singles. His first three studio albums — Young Man, Billy Dean and Fire in the Dark — are all certified gold by the RIAA, as is his 1994 Greatest Hits album.

Dean's highest-charting solo singles in the U.S. all peaked at number 3 on the Billboard Hot Country Songs charts: "Only Here for a Little While", "Somewhere in My Broken Heart", and "If There Hadn't Been You". The latter and its follow-up, "Tryin' to Hide a Fire in the Dark", both reached number 1 on the RPM Country Tracks charts in Canada. Dean and Alison Krauss both received chart credit for their guest vocals on Kenny Rogers' 2000 Number One hit "Buy Me a Rose".

== Studio albums ==
=== 1990s albums ===
| Title | Album details | Peak chart positions | | | Certifications (sales thresholds) |
| Title | Album details | US Country | US | CAN Country | Certifications (sales thresholds) |
|---|---|---|---|---|---|
| Young Man | Release date: August 21, 1990; Label: Capitol Records | 12 | 99 | — | US: Gold |
| Billy Dean | Release date: September 24, 1991; Label: Capitol Records | 22 | 88 | 8 | US: Gold |
| Fire in the Dark | Release date: January 26, 1993; Label: Liberty Records | 14 | 83 | 4 | US: Gold; CAN: Gold |
| Men'll Be Boys | Release date: June 14, 1994; Label: Liberty Records | 51 | — | — | |
| It's What I Do | Release date: April 2, 1996; Label: Capitol Records | 18 | 143 | — | |
| Real Man | Release date: August 25, 1998; Label: Capitol Records | 41 | — | — | |
"—" denotes releases that did not chart

=== 2000s albums ===
| Title | Album details | Peak chart positions | |
| Title | Album details | US Country | US |
|---|---|---|---|
| Let Them Be Little | Release date: March 29, 2005; Label: Curb Records | 8 | 50 |
| The Christ (A Song for Joseph) | Release date: October 11, 2005; Label: Curb Records | — | — |
| Sings Richard Leigh | Release date: May 26, 2009; Label: BDMG Records | — | — |
"—" denotes releases that did not chart

=== 2010s albums ===
| Title | Album details |
|---|---|
| The One Behind the Wheel | Release date: February 2, 2010; Label: BDMG Records |
| A Man of Good Fortune | Release date: September 25, 2012; Label: Rainman Records |

=== 2020s albums ===
| Title | Album details |
|---|---|
| The Rest of It's Mine | Release date: July 22, 2022; Label: self-released |

== Compilation albums ==
| Title | Album details | Peak chart positions | | Certifications (sales thresholds) |
| Title | Album details | US Country | US | Certifications (sales thresholds) |
|---|---|---|---|---|
| Greatest Hits | Release date: March 8, 1994; Label: SBK/Liberty Records | 29 | 148 | US: Gold |
| Love Songs | Release date: April 11, 2000; Label: Capitol Nashville | — | — | |
| Certified Hits | Release date: September 24, 2002; Label: Capitol Nashville | — | — | |
| The Best of Billy Dean | Release date: December 30, 2003; Label: Capitol Nashville | — | — | |
| The Very Best of Billy Dean | Release date: March 29, 2005; Label: Capitol Nashville | — | — | |
"—" denotes releases that did not chart

== Singles ==
=== 1990s ===
| Year | Single | Peak chart positions | | | | Album |
| Year | Single | US Country | US AC | CAN Country | CAN AC | Album |
|---|---|---|---|---|---|---|
| 1990 | "Lowdown Lonely" | — | — | — | — | Young Man |
| 1990 | "Only Here for a Little While" | 3 | — | 2 | — | Young Man |
| 1991 | "Somewhere in My Broken Heart" | 3 | 18 | 2 | 18 | Young Man |
| 1991 | "You Don't Count the Cost" | 4 | — | 3 | — | Billy Dean |
| 1991 | "Only the Wind" | 4 | 48 | 3 | — | Billy Dean |
| 1992 | "Billy the Kid" | 4 | — | 3 | — | Billy Dean |
| 1992 | "If There Hadn't Been You" | 3 | 39 | 1 | — | Billy Dean |
| 1992 | "Tryin' to Hide a Fire in the Dark" | 6 | — | 1 | — | Fire in the Dark |
| 1993 | "I Wanna Take Care of You" | 22 | — | 9 | — | Fire in the Dark |
| 1993 | "I'm Not Built That Way" | 34 | — | 18 | — | Fire in the Dark |
| 1993 | "We Just Disagree" | 9 | — | 6 | — | Fire in the Dark |
| 1994 | "Cowboy Band" | 24 | — | 22 | — | Men'll Be Boys |
| 1994 | "Men Will Be Boys" | 60 | — | 75 | — | Men'll Be Boys |
| 1996 | "It's What I Do" | 5 | — | 11 | — | It's What I Do |
| 1996 | "That Girl's Been Spyin' on Me" | 4 | — | 3 | — | It's What I Do |
| 1996 | "I Wouldn't Be a Man" | 45 | — | 32 | — | It's What I Do |
| 1998 | "Real Man" | 33 | — | 49 | — | Real Man |
| 1998 | "Innocent Bystander" | 68 | — | — | — | Real Man |
"—" denotes releases that did not chart

=== 2000s and 2010s ===
| Year | Single | Peak chart positions | | Album |
| Year | Single | US Country | US | Album |
|---|---|---|---|---|
| 2001 | "Keep Mom and Dad in Love" (with Suzy Bogguss and introducing Jillian) | 51 | — | —N/a |
| 2003 | "I'm in Love with You" | 52 | — | Let Them Be Little |
| 2004 | "Thank God I'm a Country Boy" | 27 | — | Let Them Be Little |
| 2004 | "Let Them Be Little" | 8 | 68 | Let Them Be Little |
| 2005 | "This Is the Life" | 52 | — | Let Them Be Little |
| 2005 | "Race You to the Bottom" | — | — | Let Them Be Little |
| 2006 | "Swinging for the Fence" | — | — | Let Them Be Little |
| 2013 | "I Can't Leave a Good Thing" | — | — | A Man of Good Fortune |
"—" denotes releases that did not chart

== Other singles ==
=== Other charted songs ===
| Year | Single | Peak chart positions | | Album |
| Year | Single | US Country | CAN Country | Album |
|---|---|---|---|---|
| 1994 | "Once in a While" | 53 | 60 | 8 Seconds (soundtrack) |

=== Christmas releases ===
| Year | Single | Album |
|---|---|---|
| 1996 | "I Still Believe in Christmas" | —N/a |
| 2005 | "Shine On" | The Christ: A Song for Joseph |

=== Guest singles ===
| Year | Single | Artist(s) | Peak chart positions | | | Album |
| Year | Single | Artist(s) | US Country | US | CAN Country | Album |
|---|---|---|---|---|---|---|
| 1998 | "One Heart at a Time"^{[A]} | Various | 69 | 56 | — | —N/a |
| 1999 | "Buy Me a Rose" | Kenny Rogers and Alison Krauss | 1 | 40 | 9 | She Rides Wild Horses |
| 2001 | "America the Beautiful" | Various | 58 | — | — | —N/a |
| 2014 | "An American with a Remington" | Larry Gatlin | — | — | — | The Gospel According to Gatlin |
| 2016 | "Already a Dead Man" | Jason Pritchett | — | — | — | —N/a |
"—" denotes releases that did not chart

== Videography ==
=== Music videos ===
| Year | Title | Director |
|---|---|---|
| 1990 | "Only Here for a Little While" | Bill Young |
| 1991 | "Somewhere in My Broken Heart" | Bill Young |
| 1991 | "Only the Wind" | Bill Young |
| 1992 | "Billy the Kid" | Bill Young |
| 1992 | "If There Hadn't Been You" | Roger Pistole |
| 1993 | "Tryin' to Hide a Fire in the Dark" | Bill Young |
| 1993 | "I'm Not Built That Way" | Bill Young |
| 1994 | "We Just Disagree" | Marius Penczner |
| 1994 | "Once in a While" | Charley Randazzo |
| 1994 | "Men Will Be Boys" | Charley Randazzo |
| 1996 | "It's What I Do" | Martin Kahan |
| 1996 | "I Wouldn't Be a Man" | Richard Murray |
| 1998 | "Real Man" | Crystal Bernard/Steven R. Monroe |
| 1998 | "One Heart at a Time"^{[A]} | |
| 2001 | "America the Beautiful"(Various) | Marc Ball |
| 2003 | "I'm in Love with You" | |
| 2004 | "Thank God I'm a Country Boy" | |
| 2004 | "Let Them Be Little" | Eric Welch |

== Notes ==
- A Song featured Faith Hill, Bryan White, Garth Brooks, Michael McDonald, Neal McCoy, Victoria Shaw and Olivia Newton-John.
