= Greatest Hits (Billy Dean album) =

Greatest hits album by Billy Dean
- Released: March 8, 1994
- Genre: Country
- Length: 34:19
- Label: SBK/Liberty
- Producer: Jimmy Bowen; Billy Dean; Chuck Howard; Tom Shapiro

Billy Dean chronology
Fire in the Dark (1993)	Greatest Hits (1994)	Men'll Be Boys (1994)

Professional ratings
Review scores
Source	Rating
Allmusic	link

Greatest Hits is the first compilation album by American country music artist Billy Dean. It reprises his first nine singles, presented in chronological order from 1991's "Only Here for a Little While" to 1993's "I'm Not Built That Way", as well as the track "Once in a While", which was also included on the soundtrack to the 1994 film 8 Seconds. The album was certified gold by the RIAA.

== Track listing ==
No.	Title	Writer(s)	Length
1.	"Only Here for a Little While"	Wayland Holyfield, Richard Leigh	3:33
2.	"Somewhere in My Broken Heart"	Billy Dean, Leigh	3:19
3.	"You Don't Count the Cost"	Tom Shapiro, Chris Waters, Bucky Jones	3:15
4.	"Only the Wind"	Shapiro, Chuck Jones	3:36
5.	"Billy the Kid"	Dean, Paul Nelson	3:04
6.	"If There Hadn't Been You"	Shapiro, Ron Hellard	3:18
7.	"Tryin' to Hide a Fire in the Dark"	Dean, Tim Nichols	3:35
8.	"I Wanna Take Care of You"	Dean, J.K. Jones	3:54
9.	"I'm Not Built That Way"	Don Pfrimmer, George Teren	2:52
10.	"Once in a While"	Steve Dorff, John Bettis	3:53

== Chart performance ==
Chart (1994)	Peak position
U.S. Billboard Top Country Albums	29
U.S. Billboard 200	148
