= Midnight Fire =

Studio album by Steve Wariner
- Released: 1983
- Studio: The Music Mill, Woodland Sound Studios and GroundStar Laboratories (Nashville, Tennessee)
- Genre: Country
- Length: 31:40
- Label: RCA Nashville
- Producer: Tony Brown; Tom Collins; Norro Wilson

Steve Wariner chronology
Steve Wariner (1982)	Midnight Fire (1983)	One Good Night Deserves Another (1985)

Singles from Midnight Fire
- 1. "Don't Your Memory Ever Sleep at Night" Released: April 1983; 2. "Midnight Fire" Released: August 13, 1983; 3. "Lonely Women Make Good Lovers" Released: December 10, 1983; 4. "Why Goodbye" Released: April 7, 1984; 5. "Don't You Give Up on Love" Released: July 1984

Midnight Fire is the second studio album by American country music artist Steve Wariner. It was released in 1983 by RCA Nashville. The album produced five singles on the Billboard Hot Country Singles chart including two top ten singles: "Don't Your Memory Ever Sleep at Night" at number 23, "Midnight Fire" at number 5, "Lonely Women Make Good Lovers" (a cover of a 1972 Bob Luman hit) at number 4, "Why Goodbye" at number 12, and "Don't You Give Up on Love" at number 49.

== Content ==
"Overnight Sensation" features Barbara Mandrell on duet vocals. This same recording also appears on Mandrell's 1983 album Spun Gold.

The album was produced by Tony Brown and Norro Wilson, except for the last two tracks, which were produced by Tom Collins instead.

== Critical reception ==
Giving it 4.5 out of 5 stars, Joy Lynn Stewart of the Red Deer Advocate said that the album had "fine, textured vocals". She felt that Wariner's singing was as strong on the uptempo material as it was on the ballads, and felt that Wariner's style was "old-fashioned country...blended with a newer sound."

== Track listing ==
No.	Title	Writer(s)	Length
1.	"Lonely Women Make Good Lovers"	Spooner Oldham, Freddy Weller	3:14
2.	"Midnight Fire"	Lewis Anderson, Dave Gibson	3:10
3.	"When Is It All Gonna End"	Clarence Foster, Linda Foster	3:08
4.	"Why Goodbye"	Richard Leigh, Mark Wright	3:38
5.	"I Can Hear Kentucky Calling Me"	Felice and Boudleaux Bryant	3:18
6.	"Don't You Give Up on Love"	Gibson	2:57
7.	"I'm Depending on You"	John Jarrard, Brent Mason	3:18
8.	"Honey Why"	George Parks, Swain Schaefer	2:48
9.	"Don't Your Mem'ry Ever Sleep at Night"	Steve Dean, Randy Hatch	3:07
10.	"Overnight Sensation" (featuring Barbara Mandrell)	Jerry Fuller	3:05

== Personnel ==
- Steve Wariner – vocals, guitar solo (2), first guitar solo (5)
- Bobby Ogdin – electric piano (1, 3–5, 7–9), synthesizers (2, 10), acoustic piano (10), Rhodes electric piano (10)
- Alan Steinberger – synthesizers (1, 3, 7, 8)
- David Briggs – electric piano (6), synthesizers (6), acoustic piano (9, 10), Rhodes electric piano (10)
- Shane Keister – synthesizers (10)
- Tom Collins – organ (10)
- Randy McCormick – organ (10)
- Brent Rowan – electric guitars (1–4, 7, 8), acoustic guitar (3, 5), guitar solo (3, 8)
- Chip Young – acoustic guitar (3)
- Chet Atkins – second guitar solo (5)
- Pete Wade – electric guitars (6)
- Peter Bordonali – electric guitars (9, 10)
- Jimmy Capps – rhythm guitar (9, 10)
- Larry Byrom – electric guitars (10)
- Reggie Young – electric guitars (10)
- Dennis Morgan – rhythm guitar (10)
- John Hughey – steel guitar (1, 2)
- Sonny Garrish – steel guitar (3, 6, 7, 9, 10)
- Michael Jones – steel guitar (10)
- Bobby Thompson – banjo (5), acoustic guitar (6)
- Emory Gordy Jr. – bass (1–5, 7, 8), acoustic guitar (3)
- Henry Strzelecki – bass (6)
- David Hungate – bass (9, 10)
- Matt Leech – bass (10)
- Larry Paxton – bass (10)
- Eddie Bayers – drums (1–5, 7, 8)
- Jerry Kroon – drums (6)
- James Stroud – drums (9, 10)
- Terry McMillan – percussion (8)
- Hoot Hester – fiddle (2, 5)
- Michael Wesley Foster – saxophone solo (4)
- Terry Wariner – harmony vocals (1), backing vocals (4)
- Vince Gill – harmony vocals (2), backing vocals (4)
- The Cherry Sisters – backing vocals (3, 7, 9, 10)
- Jessica Boucher – backing vocals (6, 8)
- Don Gant – backing vocals (6)
- Greg Gordon – backing vocals (8)
- Donny Lowery – backing vocals (8)
- Barbara Mandrell – vocals (10)

=== Production ===
- Tony Brown – producer (1–8)
- Norro Wilson – producer (1–8)
- Tom Collins – producer (9, 10)
- Jim Cotton – engineer
- Tim Farmer – engineer
- Ben Harris – engineer
- Bill Harris – engineer
- Lee Ladd – engineer
- Kyle Lehning – engineer
- Ken Corlew – assistant engineer
- Doug Crider – assistant engineer
- Joe Scaife – assistant engineer
- Hank Williams – mastering at MasterMix (Nashville, Tennessee)
- Denny Purcell – mastering at Woodland Sound Studios (Nashville, Tennessee)
- Bill Brunt – art direction
- Beverly Parker – photography
- Don Light – management

== Chart performance ==
=== Album ===
Chart (1983)	Peak position
U.S. Billboard Top Country Albums	39
