= Let Them Be Little =

Studio album by Billy Dean
- Released: March 29, 2005
- Genre: Country
- Length: 35:58
- Label: Curb
- Producer: Ray Barnette; Billy Dean; Lari White

Billy Dean chronology
Real Man (1998)	Let Them Be Little (2005)	The Christ (A Song for Joseph) (2005)

Singles from Let Them Be Little
- 1. "Let Them Be Little" Released: August 30, 2004

Professional ratings
Review scores
Source	Rating
AllMusic	4/5 stars

Let Them Be Little is the seventh studio album by American country music singer Billy Dean. His first album since Real Man seven years previous, it is also his first release on Curb Records. The album was originally to have been released in 2003, on View 2 Records, which promoted the first two singles ("I'm in Love with You" and a cover of John Denver's "Thank God I'm a Country Boy"). Asylum-Curb promoted the third single, "Let Them Be Little", which was co-written by Richie McDonald, lead singer of Lonestar, and recorded by the band on their 2004 album Let's Be Us Again. After this song came "This Is the Life", "Race You to the Bottom" and "Swinging for the Fence". Also included on the album are re-recordings of "Somewhere in My Broken Heart" and "Billy the Kid", two of Dean's early singles from 1991 and 1992.

Dean produced the entire album, working with Lari White on tracks 3–7 and Ray Barnette for the rest.

== Track listing ==
No.	Title	Writer(s)	Length
1.	"This Is the Life"	Billy Dean, Chuck Cannon	2:43
2.	"Eyes"	Dean, Ray Barnette	3:35
3.	"Thank God I'm a Country Boy"	John Sommers	2:54
4.	"I'm in Love with You"	Dean, Cannon	3:38
5.	"Slow Motion"	Dean, Cannon, Chuck Jones	3:50
6.	"Let Them Be Little"	Dean, Richie McDonald	3:43
7.	"Good Love Gone Bad"	Dean, Cannon, Stephanie Paisley	3:05
8.	"Race You to the Bottom"	Dean, Barnette	3:21
9.	"Shelfer Street"	Dean	2:39
10.	"Swinging for the Fence"	Dean, Barnette	3:02
11.	"Somewhere in My Broken Heart"	Dean, Richard Leigh	3:22
12.	"Billy the Kid"	Dean, Paul Nelson	3:08

== Personnel ==
- Billy Dean – vocals, backing vocals (3–5, 7), acoustic guitar (4, 6, 7, 11)
- Tim Akers – organ (1), keyboards (3–7, 11, 12), acoustic piano (11, 12)
- John Barlow Jarvis – acoustic piano (3, 5)
- Joe Hogue – programming (3), keyboards (4, 6, 7)
- Matt Rollings – acoustic piano (4, 6, 7)
- Jerry McPherson – electric guitars (1, 3–5, 7, 10)
- John Willis – acoustic guitar (1, 3, 10), electric guitars (3)
- Jeff King – electric guitars (2, 8, 9, 11, 12)
- Bryan Sutton – acoustic guitar (2, 8, 9)
- Biff Watson – acoustic guitar (3, 5, 11, 12)
- Kevin Haynie – banjo (1, 2, 8–10)
- Glen Duncan – mandolin (1)
- Dave Harvey – mandolin (2, 9)
- Sam Bush – mandolin (8)
- Paul Franklin – steel guitar (3–7)
- Scotty Sanders – steel guitar (11, 12)
- Ray Barnette – bass (1, 8, 10–12), backing vocals (1, 2, 5–12)
- Mike Brignardello – bass (2, 3, 5, 9)
- Michael Rhodes – bass (4, 6, 7)
- Paul Leim – drums (1, 10–12)
- Shannon Forrest – drums (2, 3, 5, 8, 9)
- Dan Needham – drums (4, 6, 7)
- Aubrey Haynie – fiddle (2, 3)
- Jonathan Yudkin – fiddle (7)
- Stuart Duncan – fiddle (8–10), mandolin (10)
- Jim Hoke – harmonica (11, 12)
- Marty Slayton – backing vocals (2, 8)
- Wes Hightower – backing vocals (3)
- Marcia Ramirez – backing vocals (7)
- Kim Parent – backing vocals (12)

=== Production ===
- Paul Jenkins – recording engineer
- Eric Legg – recording engineer, mixing (3)
- Dan Rudin – recording engineer
- Craig White – recording engineer
- Billy Decker – mixing (1, 2, 5–12)
- Bob Campbell-Smith – mixing (4)
- Chuck Howard – mixing (4)
- Georgetown Masters (Nashville, Tennessee) – mastering location
- Glenn Sweitzer – art direction, design
- Tony Baker – photography
- Christiév Carothers – stylist
- Debra Wingo – make-up
- Herbert Graham – management

== Charts ==
Chart (2005)	Peak position
US Billboard 200	50
US Top Country Albums (Billboard)	8
