= Somebody Loves You =

Somebody Loves You may refer to:

- Somebody Loves You (album), a 1975 album by Crystal Gayle
  - "Somebody Loves You" (Crystal Gayle song), the album's title track
- "Somebody Loves You" (1932 song), by Peter deRose and Charles Tobias
- "Somebody Loves You" (Nik Kershaw song), 1999
- "Somebody Loves You" (Betty Who song), 2012
- "Somebody Loves You Baby (You Know Who It Is)", a 1991 song by Patti LaBelle
- Somebody Loves You, a 2009 album by Austin Lucas
- "Somebody Loves You", a song by The Delfonics from Sound of Sexy Soul
- "Somebody Loves You", a song by Eels from Shootenanny!
- "Somebody (Loves You)", a song by Plies from Definition of Real
