= Why Goodbye =

Single by Steve Wariner

from the album Midnight Fire
- B-side: "Don't Give Up on Love"
- Released: April 7, 1984
- Genre: Country
- Length: 3:38
- Label: RCA Nashville
- Songwriter(s): Richard Leigh, Mark Wright
- Producer(s): Tony Brown, Norro Wilson

Steve Wariner singles chronology
"Lonely Women Make Good Lovers" (1983)	"Why Goodbye" (1984)	"Don't You Give Up on Love" (1984)

"Why Goodbye" is a song written by Richard Leigh and Mark Wright and recorded by American country music artist Steve Wariner. It was released in April 1984 as the third single from the album Midnight Fire. The song reached #12 on the Billboard Hot Country Singles & Tracks chart.

== Critical reception ==
A review in Cash Box was positive toward the song, stating that "The song utilizes harmonies to top off Wariner’s richer vocals. A ripping sax joins some bass rifts to give the tune an even better chance to crossover onto the A/C charts."

== Chart performance ==
Chart (1984)	Peak position
US Hot Country Songs (Billboard)	12
Canadian RPM Country Tracks	16
