= Real Man (disambiguation) =

Real Man is a 1998 album by Billy Dean.

Real Man may also refer to:

- "Real Man" (Billy Dean song), a song by Billy Dean from the same album
- Real Man (Jolin Tsai song), 2009
- Real Man (TV series) a South Korean variety show
- "Real Man", a song by Bonnie Raitt from her 1989 album Nick of Time
- "Real Man", a song by Todd Rundgren from his 1975 album Initiation
- "Real Man", a song by Bruce Springsteen from his 1992 album Human Touch
- "Real Man", a song by Lexington Bridge from their 2007 album The Vibe
- "Real Man", a song by Beabadoobee from her 2024 album This Is How Tomorrow Moves

== See also ==
- A Real Man (disambiguation)
