= 13th Academy of Country Music Awards =

US music awards ceremony in 1978

- Date: April 12, 1978
- Location: Shrine Auditorium, Los Angeles, California
- Hosted by: Donna Fargo; Barbara Mandrell; Kenny Rogers

Highlights
- Most wins: Kenny Rogers (4)
- Most nominations: Kenny Rogers (5)

Television/radio coverage
- Network: ABC

The 13th Academy of Country Music Awards ceremony was held on April 12, 1978, at the Shrine Auditorium, Los Angeles, California. It was hosted by Donna Fargo, Barbara Mandrell and Kenny Rogers.

== Winners and nominees ==
Winners are shown in bold.

| Entertainer of the Year | Album of the Year |
|---|---|
| **Dolly Parton**; Roy Clark; Loretta Lynn; Kenny Rogers; Mel Tillis | **Kenny Rogers — Kenny Rogers**; Conway Twitty's Greatest Hits Vol. II — Conway Twitty; Here You Come Again — Dolly Parton; Moody Blue — Elvis Presley; Ol' Waylon — Waylon Jennings |
| Top Female Vocalist of the Year | Top Male Vocalist of the Year |
| **Crystal Gayle**; Emmylou Harris; Loretta Lynn; Dolly Parton; Linda Ronstadt | **Kenny Rogers**; Mickey Gilley; Ronnie Milsap; Mel Tillis; Conway Twitty |
| Top Vocal Group of the Year | Career Achievement Award |
| **Statler Brothers**; Asleep at the Wheel; Dave & Sugar; Oak Ridge Boys; Conway Twitty and Loretta Lynn | **Johnny Paycheck**; Jerry Lee Lewis; Roy Orbison; Jimmie Rodgers; Dottie West |
| Single Record of the Year | Song of the Year |
| **"Lucille"** — **Kenny Rogers**; "Blue Bayou" — Linda Ronstadt; "Don't It Make My Brown Eyes Blue" — Crystal Gayle; "Luckenbach, Texas (Back to the Basics of Love)" — Waylon Jennings; "You Light Up My Life" — Debby Boone | **"Lucille"** — **Roger Bowling, Hal Bynum**; "Don't It Make My Brown Eyes Blue" — Richard Leigh; "From Graceland to the Promised Land" — Merle Haggard; "Luckenbach, Texas (Back to the Basics of Love)" — Bobby Emmons, Chips Moman; "You Light Up My Life" — Joseph Brooks |
| Top New Male Vocalist | Top New Female Vocalist |
| **Eddie Rabbitt**; Bobby Borchers; Howdy Glenn; Vern Gosdin; Mel McDaniel | **Debby Boone**; Helen Cornelius; Janie Fricke; Stella Parton; Mary Lou Turner |
Pioneer Award
**Sons of the Pioneers**
