= Real Men =

Real Men may refer to:

- Real Men (film), a 1987 film
- Real Men (British TV series), a 2003 UK TV miniseries
- Real Man (TV series), also known as Real Men, a 2013 South Korean TV series
- Real Men (album), a 1991 album by John S. Hall and Kramer
- "Real Men" (song), a 1982 song by Joe Jackson
- Real Men (Italian TV series), a 2025 Italian TV series

== See also ==
- Real Man (disambiguation)
- Takes a Real Man, a Chinese TV variety show based on the South Korean series Real Man
