= Midnight Fire (song) =

Single by Steve Wariner

from the album Midnight Fire
- B-side: "You Turn It All Around"
- Released: August 13, 1983
- Genre: Country
- Length: 3:10
- Label: RCA Nashville
- Songwriter(s): Dave Gibson, Lewis Anderson
- Producer(s): Tony Brown, Norro Wilson

Steve Wariner singles chronology
"Don't Your Memory Ever Sleep at Night" (1983)	"Midnight Fire" (1983)	"Lonely Women Make Good Lovers" (1983)

"Midnight Fire" is a song written by Dave Gibson and Lewis Anderson, and recorded by American country music artist Steve Wariner. It was released in August 1983 as the first single and title track from the album Midnight Fire. The song reached #5 on the Billboard Hot Country Singles & Tracks chart.

== Chart performance ==
Chart (1983)	Peak position
US Hot Country Songs (Billboard)	5
Canadian RPM Country Tracks	11
