= Cowboy Band =

Single by Billy Dean

from the album Men'll Be Boys
- B-side: "Billy the Kid"
- Released: June 4, 1994
- Genre: Country
- Length: 3:38
- Label: Liberty
- Songwriter(s): Jule Medders, Monty Powell
- Producer(s): Jimmy Bowen, Billy Dean

Billy Dean singles chronology
"Once in a While" (1994)	"Cowboy Band" (1994)	"Men Will Be Boys" (1994)

"Cowboy Band" is a song recorded by American country music artist Billy Dean. It was released in June 1994 as the first single from the album Men'll Be Boys. The song reached #24 on the Billboard Hot Country Singles & Tracks chart. The song was written by Jule Medders and Monty Powell.

== Chart performance ==
Chart (1994)	Peak position
US Hot Country Songs (Billboard)	24
Canadian RPM Country Tracks	22
