= Ain't Got Time to Be Unhappy =

Single by Bob Luman

from the album Ain't Got Time to Be Unhappy
- B-side: "I Can't Remember to Forget"
- Released: April 5, 1968
- Genre: Country
- Length: 2:00
- Label: Epic Records; 5-10312
- Songwriter(s): Glenn Sutton
- Producer(s): Glenn Sutton

Bob Luman singles chronology
| "Running Scared" (November 1967) | "Ain't Got Time to Be Unhappy" (1968) | "I Like Trains" (July 1968) |

"Ain't Got Time to Be Unhappy" is a song written by Glenn Sutton and performed by Bob Luman. In 1968, the track reached #6 on the Canadian country chart and #19 on the U.S. country chart.

It was featured on his 1968 album, Ain't Got Time to Be Unhappy.
