= What a Man =

What a Man or Whatta Man may refer to:

== Film ==
- What a Man (1930 film), an American film
- What a Man! (1938 film), a British film
- What a Man (2011 film), a German comedy film
- Never Give a Sucker an Even Break, a 1941 film known in some foreign releases as What a Man!

== Music ==
- "What a Man" (song), a 1968 song by Linda Lyndell
- "Whatta Man", a 1993 song by Salt-n-Pepa and En Vogue
- "Whatta Man" (I.O.I song), 2016

== See also ==
- A Real Man (disambiguation)
