= Lonely Women Make Good Lovers =

Song first recorded by Bob Luman

Single by Bob Luman

from the album Lonely Women Make Good Lovers
- B-side: "Love Ought to Be a Happy Thing"
- Released: September 2, 1972
- Genre: Country
- Length: 3:10
- Label: Epic
- Songwriters: Freddy Weller, Spooner Oldham
- Producer: Glenn Sutton

Bob Luman singles chronology
"It Takes You" (1972)	"Lonely Women Make Good Lovers" (1972)	"Neither One of Us" (1973)

"Lonely Women Make Good Lovers"

Single by Steve Wariner

from the album Midnight Fire
- B-side: "I Can Hear Kentucky Calling Me"
- Released: December 10, 1983
- Genre: Country
- Length: 3:14
- Label: RCA Nashville
- Songwriters: Freddy Weller, Spooner Oldham
- Producers: Tony Brown, Norro Wilson

Steve Wariner singles chronology
"Midnight Fire" (1983)	"Lonely Women Make Good Lovers" (1983)	"Why Goodbye" (1984)

"Lonely Women Make Good Lovers" is a song written by Freddy Weller and Spooner Oldham, and first recorded by American country music artist Bob Luman. Luman's version was the second single from his 1972 album of the same name. He released the single on August 2, 1972, and it debuted on the Hot Country Singles (now Hot Country Songs) charts in September, spending nineteen weeks on it and peaking at number 4. Weller released his version of the song on his October 1972 album, The Roadmaster.

In December 1983, Steve Wariner covered the song for his album Midnight Fire on RCA Nashville. Wariner's rendition of the song first charted on the same chart in December 1983, also reaching a peak of number 4 in early 1984.

== Chart performance ==
=== Bob Luman ===
Chart (1972)	Peak position
US Hot Country Songs (Billboard)	4
Canada RPM Country Tracks	4

=== Steve Wariner ===
Chart (1983–1984)	Peak position
US Hot Country Songs (Billboard)	4
Canada RPM Country Tracks	3
