= The Pay Phone =

Single by Bob Luman

from the album Bob Luman
- B-side: "He'll Be the One"
- Released: September 1977
- Genre: Country
- Length: 2:49
- Label: Polydor Records; 14431
- Songwriter(s): Glenn Martin
- Producer(s): Jim Vienneau

Bob Luman singles chronology
"I'm a Honky-Tonk Woman's Man" (June 1977)	"The Pay Phone" (1977)	"A Christmas Tribute" (November 1977)

"The Pay Phone" is a song written by Glenn Martin and performed by Bob Luman. In 1977, the track reached #13 on the U.S. country chart.

It was featured on his 1978 album, Bob Luman.
