= Let It Flow (Dave Mason album) =

1977 album

Studio album by Dave Mason
- Released: April 1977
- Genres: Folk rock, Soft rock, Country Rock
- Label: Columbia
- Producers: Dave Mason, Ron Nevison

Dave Mason chronology
| Certified Live (1976) | Let It Flow (1977) | Mariposa De Oro (1978) |

Professional ratings
Review scores
| Source | Rating |
|---|---|
| AllMusic | 4/5 stars |
| The Rolling Stone Album Guide | 2.5/5 stars |

Let It Flow is the sixth solo studio album by Dave Mason, released in 1977. Let It Flow was Mason’s biggest selling album while on Columbia Records. Mason was joined on the album by a variety of guest musicians. The album reached #37 on the Billboard 200, lasting 49 weeks on the chart. The song "We Just Disagree" reached number #12 on the Billboard charts in the US and was the record's major commercial success. Other charting singles from this album are "So High (Rock Me Baby and Roll Me Away)" and "Let It Go, Let It Flow", which reached #89 and #45 in the US respectively.

== Track listing ==
All tracks are written by Dave Mason, unless otherwise noted.

| No. | Title | Writer(s) | Length |
|---|---|---|---|
| 1. | "So High (Rock Me Baby and Roll Me Away)" | Jack Conrad, Mentor Williams | 4:08 |
| 2. | "We Just Disagree" | Jim Krueger | 3:00 |
| 3. | "Mystic Traveler" | | 5:00 |
| 4. | "Spend Your Life with Me" | Jeremy Storch | 3:22 |
| 5. | "Takin’ the Time to Find" | | 4:30 |
| 6. | "Let It Go, Let It Flow" | | 3:16 |
| 7. | "Then It’s Alright" | | 4:15 |
| 8. | "Seasons" | Angeleen Gagliano | 4:48 |
| 9. | "You Just Have to Wait Now" | | 3:06 |
| 10. | "What Do We Got Here?" | Jim Krueger | 4:20 |
| Total length: | | | 39:45 |

== Personnel ==
- Dave Mason – guitar, vocals
- Jim Krueger – guitar, rhythm guitar, vocals
- Gerald Johnson – bass
- Mike Finnigan – keyboards, vocals
- Bobbye Hall – percussion
- Rick Jaeger – drums
- Karen Patterson – vocals
- Verna Richardson – vocals
- Yvonne Elliman – vocals on "Seasons"
- Stephen Stills – vocals
- Ernie Watts – saxophone

== Production ==
- Dave Mason, Ron Nevison – producer
- Michael Beiriger, Rick Smith – engineer
- Mike Reese – mastering
- Mick Haggerty, Tom Steele – photography/design
