= A Real Man =

A Real Man may refer to:

- A track on Sleater-Kinney (album), a 1995 studio album by the American rock band Sleater-Kinney
- A Real Man (film), a 1940 Swedish comedy film
- What a Man (1943 film), an Argentine romantic drama film

== See also ==
- Real Man (disambiguation)
- What a Man (disambiguation)
