= Somebody Loves You (album) =

Studio album by Crystal Gayle
- Released: October 20, 1975
- Studios: Jack Clement (Nashville, Tennessee)
- Genre: Country
- Length: 26:09
- Label: United Artists
- Producer: Allen Reynolds

Crystal Gayle chronology
Crystal Gayle (1975)	Somebody Loves You (1975)	Crystal (1976)

Singles from Somebody Loves You
- 1. "Somebody Loves You" Released: December 1975; 2. "I'll Get Over You" Released: March 1976

Somebody Loves You is the second studio album by the American country music musician Crystal Gayle. It was released on October 20, 1975. It peaked at No. 11 on the Billboard Country Albums chart, with two tracks that broke into the Top Ten Country Singles: the title song, "Somebody Loves You", peaked at No. 8, and Gayle scored her first ever No. 1 country hit with "I'll Get Over You".

== Critical reception ==
Professional ratings
Review scores
Source	Rating
AllMusic	3.5/5 stars
The Encyclopedia of Popular Music	3/5 stars
The New Rolling Stone Record Guide	1/5 stars

Reviewing a reissue of the album, Record Collector wrote that "the elegant two-step of 'I’ll Get Over You' and the bouncy title track [give] Gayle more substantial and challenging melodies to tackle."

== Track listing ==
No.	Title	Writer(s)	Length
1.	"Before I'm Fool Enough (To Give It One More Try)"	Allen Reynolds	2:06
2.	"I'll Get Over You"	Richard Leigh	3:30
3.	"Sweet Baby on My Mind"	Jim Owen	2:34
4.	"I Want to Lose Me in You"	Jim Rushing, Marshall Chapman	2:21
5.	"High Time"	Bobby David	2:18
6.	"Somebody Loves You"	Reynolds	2:24
7.	"What You've Done for Me"	Sandy Mason Theoret	2:51
8.	"Coming Closer"	Crystal Gayle, Bill Gatzimos	2:29
9.	"Dreaming My Dreams with You"	Reynolds	2:56
10.	"What I've Been Needin'"	Ray Griff	2:40

== Personnel ==
- Crystal Gayle – vocals
- Jimmy Colvard – electric and acoustic guitar
- Allen Reynolds – acoustic guitar, backing vocals
- Lloyd Green – steel guitar
- Buddy Spicher – fiddle
- Joe Allen – bass
- Shane Keister – keyboards
- Charles Cochran – keyboards, string arrangements
- Kenny Malone – drums, percussion
- Garth Fundis, Janie Fricke – backing vocals

== Charts ==
=== Weekly charts ===
Chart (1975–1976)	Peak position
US Top Country Albums (Billboard)	11

=== Year-end charts ===
Chart (1976)	Position
US Top Country Albums (Billboard)	6
