= Lonely Women Make Good Lovers (album) =

Studio album by Bob Luman
- Released: 1972
- Genre: Country
- Label: Epic

Bob Luman chronology
| When You Say Love (1972) | Lonely Women Make Good Lovers (1972) | Neither One of Us (1973) |

Singles from Lonely Women Make Good Lovers
- 1. "It Takes You" Released: May 10, 1972; 2. "Lonely Women Make Good Lovers" Released: August 2, 1972

Professional ratings
Review scores
| Source | Rating |
|---|---|
| Allmusic | 3/5 stars |

Lonely Women Make Good Lovers is a studio album by country artist Bob Luman which was released in 1972.

== Track listing ==
=== Side 1 ===
1. "Lonely Women Make Good Lovers" (Freddy Weller, Spooner Oldham)
2. "I'm Gonna Write a Song"
3. "Delta Dawn" (Larry Collins, Alex Harvey)
4. "Love Ought to Be a Happy Thing"
5. "Woman, I Just Want to Love You More"
6. "I'm a One Woman Man"

=== Side 2 ===
1. "It Takes You"
2. "Easy Lovin'"
3. "Sweet Baby Jane"
4. "Sugar Man"
5. "Someone to Give My Love To"

== Charts ==
Album

| Chart (1972) | Peak position |
|---|---|
| US Country Albums | 10 |

Singles

| Year | Single | Chart | Peak position |
|---|---|---|---|
| 1972 | "It Takes You" | U.S. Country | 21 |
| 1972 | "Lonely Women Make Good Lovers" | U.S. Country | 4 |
