= Young Man (Billy Dean album) =

Studio album by Billy Dean
- Released: August 21, 1990
- Studio: Emerald Sound Studios, Recording Arts, Sound Stage Studios and Studio W (Nashville, Tennessee)
- Genre: Country
- Length: 32:38
- Label: Capitol Nashville
- Producer: Chuck Howard; Tom Shapiro

Billy Dean chronology
Young Man (1990)	Billy Dean (1991)

Singles from Young Man
- 1. "Lowdown Lonely" Released: July 1990; 2. "Only Here for a Little While" Released: November 11, 1990; 3. "Somewhere in My Broken Heart" Released: May 4, 1991

Professional ratings
Review scores
Source	Rating
AllMusic	4/5 stars
Entertainment Weekly	B

Young Man is the debut studio album by American country music artist Billy Dean, released in 1990 by Capitol Nashville. It produced two hit singles: "Only Here for a Little While" and "Somewhere in My Broken Heart". Both of these songs peaked at No. 3 on the Billboard Hot Country Singles & Tracks chart, with the latter also reaching No. 18 on the Adult Contemporary chart in both the United States and Canada. The album has been certified gold by the RIAA for U.S. sales of 500,000 copies.

The track "Somewhere in My Broken Heart" was previously recorded by Randy Travis on his 1989 album No Holdin' Back. Also, "Brotherly Love" was recorded by Keith Whitley and Earl Thomas Conley on Whitley's posthumous 1991 album Kentucky Bluebird, from which it was released as a single.

== Track listing ==
No.	Title	Writer(s)	Length
1.	"Young Man"	Billy Dean, Austin Gardner	3:32
2.	"I Won't Let You Walk Away"	Keith Follesé, Adrienne Follesé, Chuck Jones	2:56
3.	"Only Here for a Little While"	Wayland Holyfield, Richard Leigh	3:34
4.	"Lowdown Lonely"	Tom Shapiro, Bucky Jones	3:13
5.	"Somewhere in My Broken Heart"	Dean, Leigh	3:21
6.	"How Can I Hold You"	Chris Waters, Shapiro, Dean	3:17
7.	"She's Taken"	Dean, Tim Nichols	3:48
8.	"What Have You Got Against Love"	Waters, Shapiro	2:50
9.	"Tear the Wall Down"	Dean, Bill Kenner	2:56
10.	"Brotherly Love"	Nichols, Jimmy Alan Stewart	3:18

== Personnel ==
As adapted from liner notes:

- Billy Dean – lead vocals, backing vocals, acoustic guitar
- Barry Beckett – acoustic piano
- John Barlow Jarvis – acoustic piano, keyboards
- Mike Lawler – keyboards
- Biff Watson – keyboards, acoustic guitar
- Brent Rowan – acoustic guitar, electric guitar
- Billy Joe Walker, Jr. – acoustic guitar, electric guitar
- Chris Leuzinger – electric guitar
- Brent Mason – electric guitar
- Reggie Young – electric guitar
- Jerry Douglas – dobro
- Mark O'Connor – mandolin
- Bruce Bouton – steel guitar
- Paul Franklin – steel guitar
- Pat Severs – steel guitar
- Dave Pomeroy – bass
- Michael Rhodes – bass
- Glenn Worf – bass
- Eddie Bayers – drums
- Lonnie Wilson – drums
- Terry McMillan – harmonica, percussion
- Rob Hajacos – fiddle
- Michael Black – backing vocals
- Jessica Boucher – backing vocals
- Rick Giles – backing vocals
- Dennis Wilson – backing vocals

=== Production ===
- Chuck Howard – producer
- Tom Shapiro – producer
- Bob Bullock – recording, mixing
- Tom Perry – recording
- Bob Campbell-Smith – recording
- Mark Coddington – overdub recording
- Brian Hardin – second engineer
- Tim Kish – second engineer
- Russ Martin – second engineer
- Milan Bogdan – digital editing
- Benny Quinn – mastering at Masterfonics (Nashville, Tennessee)
- Virginia Team – art direction
- Jerry Joyner – design
- Beverly Parker – photography

== Chart performance ==
=== Weekly charts ===
Chart (1990–91)	Peak position
US Billboard 200	99
US Top Country Albums (Billboard)	12

=== Year-end charts ===
Chart (1991)	Position
US Top Country Albums (Billboard)	38
Chart (1992)	Position
US Top Country Albums (Billboard)	73
