= Don't It Make My Brown Eyes Blue =

1977 single by Crystal Gayle

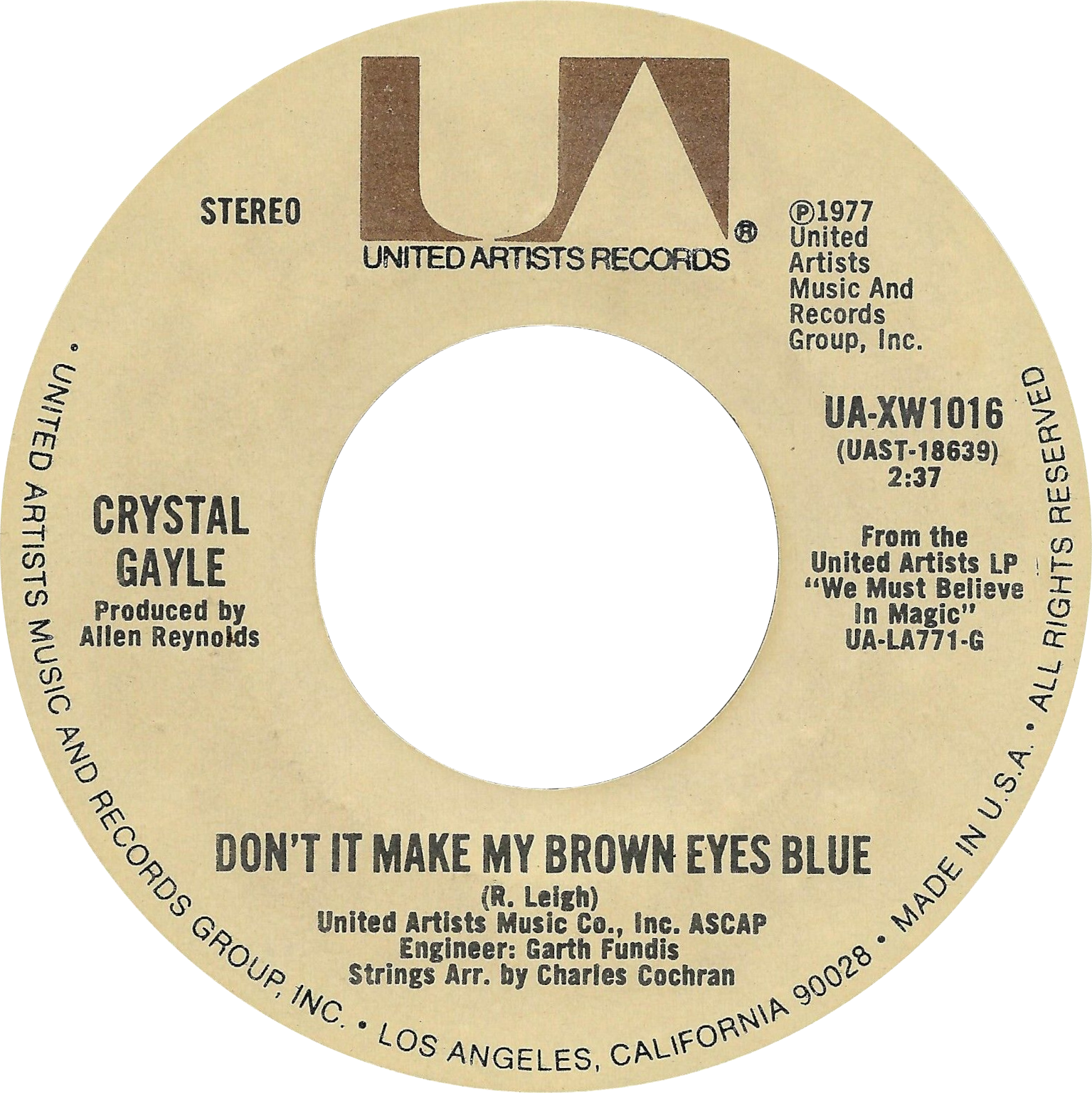
- A-side label of the US single

Single by Crystal Gayle

from the album We Must Believe in Magic
- B-side: "All I Wanna Do in Life"
- Released: June 1977
- Recorded: 1976
- Studio: Jack's Tracks (Nashville, Tennessee)
- Genre: Country pop; folk jazz
- Length: 2:37
- Label: United Artists
- Songwriter: Richard Leigh
- Producer: Allen Reynolds

Crystal Gayle singles chronology
"I'll Do It All Over Again" (1977)	"Don't It Make My Brown Eyes Blue" (1977)	"I've Cried (The Blue Right Out of My Eyes)" (1977)

"Don't It Make My Brown Eyes Blue" is a song written by Richard Leigh, and recorded by American country music singer Crystal Gayle. It was released in June 1977 as the first single from Gayle's album We Must Believe in Magic.

== Background ==
"Don't It Make My Brown Eyes Blue" composer Richard Leigh had been responsible for all three of Crystal Gayle's previous Top Ten C&W hits, the third of which "I'll Get Over You" had reached number 1. According to Gayle's regular producer Allen Reynolds, he was advised by Leigh's landlady, songwriter Sandy Mason Theoret, that Leigh was "a little down in the dumps lately because nothing much [was] happening" after the success of "I'll Get Over You". At Theoret's suggestion, Reynolds visited Leigh to cheer him up. Reynolds explained, "we were sittin' on the floor...singing songs to one another. [Leigh] mentioned a song that his publisher was gonna get to Shirley Bassey...[and] sang it for me: 'Don't It Make My Brown Eyes Blue'. I said, 'Shirley Bassey my ass, I want that song!'" Reynolds recalls that when he played "Don't It Make My Brown Eyes Blue" for Gayle "she was just as excited [by the song] as I was."

The track was recorded at Jack's Tracks recording studio in Nashville on October 27, 1976. As Reynolds' regular session keyboardist Charles Cochran had suffered a stroke with some resultant numbness in his hands, Reynolds hired Hargus "Pig" Robbins to play keyboards, and Robbins instantly devised the song's signature acoustic piano riff; Cochran was also featured on the session playing the horn parts on a Wurlitzer. Reynolds noted "it was just one of those charmed sessions...[After] we presented the song to the musicians...it was about the third time running [through] that song that we ran tape...[Gayle] sang [the song] wonderfully. It came so fast that she wasn't sure that she had done her best job. I had to let her try to sing it again on two or three different occasions until she was comfortable with the original [vocal take], and that's what we went with. Everything on that recording was the original take as it went down, except the string section I added later."

In a 2004 Country Music Television interview, Gayle stated that Leigh wrote the song because his dog had one brown eye and one blue eye. However, in a 2016 interview, Richard Leigh set the record straight and said that this was not the case. His dog, Amanda, a terrier, had two brown eyes.

== Critical reception ==
The song became Gayle's signature piece throughout her career. In 1978, the song won Gayle a Grammy Award for Best Female Country Vocal Performance. In 1999, the song was recognized by ASCAP as one of the ten most-performed songs of the 20th century. The song has a jazzy feel to it when compared to many other country songs of that era. Gayle had many more hit singles for the next ten years, such as "Talking in Your Sleep", "Half the Way" "You and I" (a duet with Eddie Rabbitt) and "I'll Get Over You", but none have achieved the same level of success as "Don't It Make My Brown Eyes Blue".

In 2024, Rolling Stone ranked the song at #109 on its 200 Greatest Country Songs of All Time ranking.

== Cover versions ==
The song has been covered by Lorrae Desmond, Laura Fygi, Anita Meyer, the Nolans, Tessanne Chin, Alison Statton (aka Devine & Statton), Wendy Van Wanten, and Dana Winner. Mireille Mathieu recorded the song first in French as "Un peu de bleu" in 1977 then in German as "Tränen Würden Mir Nicht Stehn" in 1980, another French rendering "Mes yeux bleus sont gris" was recorded by Michèle Torr, Matell, and a Cantonese version titled "你說是甜我說苦 (You Say it is Sweet, I say it is Bitter)" was recorded by Prudence Liew for her Jokingly Saying album. Jitka Zelenková in Czech version (Loučení) in 1979 and then also Lenka Filipová in Czech version Vraní blues for her album Zamilovaná in 1981. English actor Bill Tarmey recorded the song for his 1994 album Time for Love.

== Charts ==
=== Weekly singles charts ===
Chart (1977–1978)	Peak position
Australia (Kent Music Report)	16
Canada Top Singles (RPM)	1
Canada Adult Contemporary (RPM)	1
Canada Country Singles (RPM)	1
Ireland (IRMA)	4
Netherlands (Single Top 100)	10
New Zealand (Recorded Music NZ)	9
UK Singles (Official Charts)	5
US Billboard Hot 100	2
US Adult Contemporary (Billboard)	4
US Hot Country Songs (Billboard)	1
US Cash Box Top 100	1

=== Year-end charts ===
Chart (1977)	Rank
Canada RPM Top Singles	29
US Hot Country Songs (Billboard)	2
US Cash Box Top 100	62

Chart (1978)	Rank
Australia (Kent Music Report)	82
US Billboard Hot 100	71

== See also ==
- List of Cash Box Top 100 number-one singles of 1977
