= We Just Disagree =

1977 single by Dave Mason

- Side A of the 1977 Canadian single

Single by Dave Mason

from the album Let It Flow
- B-side: "Mystic Traveller"
- Released: June 1977
- Recorded: 1977
- Genre: Soft rock
- Length: 2:51
- Label: Columbia
- Songwriter: Jim Krueger
- Producers: Dave Mason; Ron Nevison

Dave Mason singles chronology
| "So High (Rock Me Baby and Roll Me Away)" (1977) | "We Just Disagree" (1977) | "Mystic Traveller" (1978) |

"We Just Disagree" is a song recorded by the English musician Dave Mason and written by guitarist Jim Krueger, a member of Mason's backing band. It was released in June 1977 as the second single from his sixth solo album Let It Flow and reached number 12 on the Billboard Hot 100. The ballad prominently featured Krueger's 12-string guitar as well as his harmony vocal above Mason's lead vocal.

== Critical reception ==
Record World described the song as a "mid-tempo, expressive ballad" that "shows promise." Cashbox wrote that the single was "melodically acute and comfortable in a string-laden environment."

== Charts ==
| Chart (1977–1978) | Peak position |
|---|---|
| Canada RPM Adult Contemporary | 10 |
| Canada RPM Top Singles | 14 |
| US Billboard Hot 100 | 12 |
| US Billboard Adult Contemporary | 19 |

== Billy Dean version ==
"We Just Disagree"
- Sheet music cover

Single by Billy Dean

from the album Fire in the Dark
- Released: 1 November 1993
- Recorded: 1992
- Studio: Emerald Sound Studios (Nashville, Tennessee, US)
- Genre: Country
- Length: 3:24
- Label: Liberty
- Songwriter: Jim Krueger
- Producers: Jimmy Bowen; Billy Dean

Billy Dean singles chronology
| "I'm Not Built That Way" (1993) | "We Just Disagree" (1993) | "Cowboy Band" (1994) |

"We Just Disagree" was covered in 1993 by American country music singer Billy Dean. It was released in November 1993 as the fourth and final single from his album, Fire in the Dark. It was a Top Ten hit on the country music charts, peaking at number 9.

=== Music video ===
The music video was directed by Marius Penczner and premiered in early 1994.

=== Chart performance ===
| Chart (1993–1994) | Peak position |
|---|---|
| Canada Country Singles (RPM) | 6 |
| US Hot Country Songs (Billboard) | 9 |

=== Year-end charts ===
| Chart (1994) | Position |
|---|---|
| Canada Country Tracks (RPM) | 83 |
