= It's What I Do (song) =

1996 single by Billy Dean

Single by Billy Dean

from the album It's What I Do
- B-side: "The Mountain Moved"
- Released: January 22, 1996
- Genre: Country
- Length: 3:22
- Label: Capitol Nashville #58526
- Songwriters: Tom Shapiro; Chuck Jones
- Producers: Tom Shapiro; Nancy H. Williams

Billy Dean singles chronology
"Men Will Be Boys" (1994)	"It's What I Do" (1996)	"That Girl's Been Spyin' on Me" (1996)

"It's What I Do" is a song written by Tom Shapiro and Chuck Jones, and recorded by American country music singer Billy Dean. It was released in January 1996 as the first single and title track from his album It's What I Do. The song spent twenty weeks on the Hot Country Songs charts in 1996, peaking at number five.

== Critical reception ==
Deborah Evans Price, of Billboard magazine reviewed the song favorably, saying that the song "boasts a pretty melody and a solid romantic lyric that Dean delivers with warmth and conviction." She goes on to say that the song contains "no immediate bells and whistles, but it gains strength with repeated listening."

== Music video ==
The music video was directed by Martin Kahan and premiered in January 1996.

== Chart positions ==
"It's What I Do" debuted at number 70 on the U.S. Billboard Hot Country Singles & Tracks for the week of February 3, 1996.

Chart (1996)	Peak position
Canada Country Singles (RPM)	11
US Hot Country Songs (Billboard)	5

=== Year-end charts ===
Chart (1996)	Position
US Country Songs (Billboard)	41
