= Real Man (Billy Dean song) =

Single by Billy Dean

from the album Real Man
- B-side: "She Gets What She Wants"
- Released: July 4, 1998
- Genre: Country
- Length: 3:44
- Label: Capitol Nashville
- Songwriter: Billy Dean
- Producers: David Gates, Billy Dean

Billy Dean singles chronology
"In the Name of Love" (1997)	"Real Man" (1998)	"Innocent Bystander" (1998)

"Real Man" is a song written and recorded by American country music artist Billy Dean. It was released in July 1998 as the first single and title track from the album Real Man. The song reached #33 on the Billboard Hot Country Singles & Tracks chart.

== Chart performance ==
Chart (1998)	Peak position
US Hot Country Songs (Billboard)	33
Canadian RPM Country Chart	49
