= Billy Dean (album) =

Studio album by Billy Dean
- Released: September 24, 1991
- Studio: Emerald Sound Studios, Quad Studios and Sound Stage Studios (Nashville, Tennessee)
- Genre: Country
- Length: 34:32
- Label: Capitol Nashville
- Producer: Chuck Howard Tom Shapiro

Billy Dean chronology
Young Man (1990)	Billy Dean (1991)	Fire in the Dark (1993)

Singles from Billy Dean
- 1. "You Don't Count the Cost" Released: September 9, 1991; 2. "Only the Wind" Released: December 30, 1991; 3. "Billy the Kid" Released: May 18, 1992; 4. "If There Hadn't Been You" Released: August 17, 1992

Professional ratings
Review scores
Source	Rating
AllMusic	4/5 stars
Entertainment Weekly	C+

Billy Dean is the self-titled second studio album by American country music artist Billy Dean, released in 1991 by Capitol Nashville. Like his debut album Young Man, it was certified gold by the RIAA. Four singles were released from the album: "You Don't Count the Cost", "Only the Wind", "Billy the Kid" and "If There Hadn't Been You". "If There Hadn't Been You" was the highest-peaking of these, reaching No. 3 on the Billboard Hot Country Singles & Tracks chart. The other singles all reached No. 4 on the same chart.

== Track listing ==
Billy Dean track listing
No.	Title	Writer(s)	Length
1.	"Billy the Kid"	Billy Dean, Paul Nelson	3:09
2.	"Simple Things"	B. Dean, Steve Dean	3:06
3.	"Hammer Down"	Bob Regan, George Teren	4:08
4.	"Only the Wind"	Tom Shapiro, Chuck Jones	3:40
5.	"Small Favors"	B. Dean, Tim Nichols	3:01
6.	"I Shoulda Listened"	Shapiro, Ron Hellard	3:54
7.	"You Don't Count the Cost"	Bucky Jones, Shapiro, Chris Waters	3:15
8.	"Gone but Not Forgotten"	Wayland Holyfield, Verlon Thompson	2:50
9.	"If There Hadn't Been You"	Shapiro, Hellard	3:19
10.	"Intro to Daddy's Will"	B. Dean, S. Dean	0:31
11.	"Daddy's Will"	B. Dean, S. Dean	3:41

== Personnel ==
- Billy Dean – lead vocals, backing vocals, acoustic guitar, electric guitar
- Steve Nathan – acoustic piano, keyboards
- Biff Watson – acoustic piano, keyboards, acoustic guitar, electric guitar, classical guitar, band leader
- Bill Hullett – acoustic guitar, lap steel guitar
- Chuck Jones – acoustic guitar
- Brent Mason – electric guitar
- Bob Regan – electric guitar
- John Willis – electric guitar
- Bruce Bouton – dobro, pedal steel guitar
- Glenn Worf – bass
- Lonnie Wilson – drums, backing vocals
- Terry McMillan – harmonica, percussion
- Bruce Dees – backing vocals
- Julie King – backing vocals
- Tom Shapiro – backing vocals
- Lisa Silver – backing vocals
- Harry Stinson – backing vocals
- Dennis Wilson – backing vocals
- Curtis Young – backing vocals

=== Production ===
- Jimmy Gilmer – executive producer
- Chuck Howard – producer
- Tom Shapiro – producer
- Bob Bullock – recording, mixing
- Brian Hardin – recording assistant, mix assistant
- Bob Campbell-Smith – overdub recording
- Mel Jones – overdub assistant
- Paula Montonado – overdub assistant
- Milan Bogdan – digital editing
- Glenn Meadows – mastering at Masterfonics (Nashville, Tennessee)
- Virginia Team – art direction
- Jerry Joyner – design
- Jim "Señor" McGuire – photography
- Vanessa Ware – stylist
- June Arnold – make-up

== Charts ==
Chart (1992)	Peak position
US Billboard 200	88
US Top Country Albums (Billboard)	22
Canadian RPM Country Albums	8
