= I'm Not Built That Way =

Single by Billy Dean

from the album Fire in the Dark
- Released: August 21, 1993
- Genre: Country
- Length: 2:52
- Label: Liberty
- Songwriters: Don Pfrimmer, George Teren
- Producers: Jimmy Bowen, Billy Dean

Billy Dean singles chronology
"I Wanna Take Care of You" (1993)	"I'm Not Built That Way" (1993)	"We Just Disagree" (1993)

"I'm Not Built That Way" is a song written by Don Pfrimmer and George Teren, and recorded by American country music artist Billy Dean. It was released in August 1993 as the third single from the album Fire in the Dark. The song reached #34 on the Billboard Hot Country Singles & Tracks chart.

== Chart performance ==
Chart (1993)	Peak position
Canada Country Singles (RPM)	18
US Hot Country Songs (Billboard)	34
