= Somebody Loves You (Crystal Gayle song) =

Single by Crystal Gayle

from the album Somebody Loves You
- B-side: "Coming Closer"
- Released: December 1975
- Recorded: 1975
- Genre: Country
- Length: 2:27
- Label: United Artists
- Songwriter(s): Allen Reynolds
- Producer(s): Allen Reynolds

Crystal Gayle singles chronology
"This Is My Year for Mexico" (1975)	"Somebody Loves You" (1975)	"I'll Get Over You" (1976)

"Somebody Loves You" is a song written by Allen Reynolds, and recorded by American country music artist Crystal Gayle. It was released in December 1975 as the first single and title track from the album Somebody Loves You.

"Somebody Loves You" was one of two hits produced by Crystal Gayle in 1976. "Somebody Loves You" was followed by the single, "I'll Get Over You". Gayle's voice was still growing when this song was produced, but is still a pieces of work that should be remembered by Gayle. This single reached number 8 on the country music chart that year. In 1976, Gayle released an album by the same name that featured "Somebody Loves You" in it.

== Content ==
The song talks about a woman that loves someone who lives far away and she explains how she can't get in contact with him. For example, Gayle sings in one part of the song how she "couldn't reach him by the U.S. Mail". Then she says "guess who loves, somebody loves you, I do".

== Cover versions ==
The only cover version of note came from Marianne Faithfull, who recorded this for her album Dreamin' My Dreams, in 1977.

=== Weekly charts ===
Chart (1975–1976)	Peak position
US Hot Country Songs (Billboard)	8
Canadian RPM Country Tracks	1

=== Year-end charts ===
Chart (1976)	Position
US Hot Country Songs (Billboard)	44
