= Real Man =

Studio album by Billy Dean
- Released: August 25, 1998
- Studio: Sound Emporium Studios (Nashville, Tennessee)
- Genre: Country
- Length: 35:58
- Label: Capitol Nashville
- Producer: Billy Dean David Gates

Billy Dean chronology
It's What I Do (1996)	Real Man (1998)	Let Them Be Little (2005)

Singles from Real Man
- 1. "Real Man" Released: July 4, 1998

Professional ratings
Review scores
Source	Rating
AllMusic	4/5 stars

Real Man is the sixth studio album by American country music singer Billy Dean. It was released August 25, 1998, via Capitol Records Nashville. The album includes two singles: the title track and "Innocent Bystander", which respectively reached No. 33 and No. 68 on the U.S. Billboard country singles chart. Dean co-produced the album with David Gates, formerly of Bread, and co-wrote several of its songs with him. "Voices Singing" features the St. Nicholas School Children's Choir of Chattanooga, as well as Dean's son, Eli.

== Track listing ==
No.	Title	Writer(s)	Length
1.	"A Fall in Tennessee"	Billy Dean, David Gates	3:23
2.	"Innocent Bystander"	Dean, Gates	2:57
3.	"Real Man"	Dean	3:44
4.	"I'm a Fool Too"	Dean, Kenny Lewis	3:32
5.	"I'm Not Needed Here"	Dean, Gates	3:51
6.	"If I Could Find the Heart (To Love Again)" (duet with Gina Jeffreys)	Dean, Gates	3:34
7.	"Big Sister"	Dean, Bruce Burch	3:56
8.	"Voices Singing" (with St. Nicholas School Children's Choir)	Dean, Richard Leigh	4:38
9.	"By My Song"	Dean, Leigh	3:07
10.	"She Gets What She Wants"	Dean, Lewis, Tim Nichols	3:16
11.	"I'm a Kewl Kid"	Dean, Lewis, Nichols	1:29
12.	"Real Men Don't Care"	Dean, Lewis, Nichols	3:01

== Personnel ==
- Billy Dean – vocals, acoustic guitar (1, 2, 4–10), electric guitar (4), percussion (8, 9), mandolin (9)
- Matt Rollings – acoustic piano (1, 3, 5, 6)
- Steve Nathan – keyboards (2, 4)
- Doc Hollister – acoustic piano (10)
- Steuart Smith – electric guitar (2)
- David Gates – acoustic guitar (3), keyboards (5, 8, 9), bass (8, 9), string arrangements
- Brent Mason – electric guitar (4, 6)
- Andy Most – electric guitar (10)
- Paul Franklin – steel guitar (1–3, 6)
- Ron Block – banjo (7)
- Jerry Douglas – dobro (7)
- Dan Tyminski – mandolin (7)
- Glenn Worf – bass (1–6)
- Barry Bales – electric upright bass (7)
- Kenny Lewis – bass (10)
- Eddie Bayers – drums (1–6)
- David Dunseath – drums (10)
- Terry McMillan – percussion (4, 5)
- Sam Bush – fiddle (1)

Background vocals

- Billy Dean – backing vocals (1, 2, 4), harmony vocals (9)
- David Gates – backing vocals (1, 2), harmony vocals (5)
- John Wesley Ryles – backing vocals (1)
- Curtis Young – backing vocals (1)
- Gina Jeffreys – vocals (6)
- Alison Krauss – harmony vocals (7)
- St. Nicholas School Children's Choir – choir (8)
- Renée Martin – backing vocals (10)
- David Pack – backing vocals (10)

=== Production ===
- Billy Dean – producer
- David Gates – producer
- Dave Sinko – recording
- Bill Schnee – mixing at Schnee Studios (North Hollywood, California)
- Doug Sax – mastering at The Mastering Lab (Hollywood, California)
- Denise Jarvis – production assistant
- Carlton Davis – art direction
- Tom Davis – design
- Glen Hall – photography
- Mark Tucker – photography
- Colourworks – digital imaging
- Ken Kragen – management

== Chart performance ==
Chart (1998)	Peak position
US Top Country Albums (Billboard)	41
