= Let Them Be Little (song) =

Single by Billy Dean

from the album Let Them Be Little
- Released: August 30, 2004
- Genre: Country
- Length: 3:43
- Label: Asylum-Curb
- Songwriters: Billy Dean; Richie McDonald
- Producers: Billy Dean; Lari White

Billy Dean singles chronology
| "Thank God I'm a Country Boy" (2004) | "Let Them Be Little" (2004) | "This Is the Life" (2005) |

"Let Them Be Little" is a song co-written and recorded by American country music artist Billy Dean. It was released in August 2004 as the third single and title track from Dean's album Let Them Be Little. The song reached 8 on the Billboard Hot Country Singles & Tracks chart in March 2005, becoming his last Top 40 single. It was also Dean's only solo entry on the Billboard Hot 100, peaking at 68. The song was written by Dean and Richie McDonald, then-lead vocalist for Lonestar.

Lonestar also recorded the song on their album Let's Be Us Again.

== Content ==
The song is a ballad that celebrates the innocence of children, informing parents that they are a precious gift and advising them to show their children love and affection as they grow up all too soon.

== Critical reception ==
Deborah Evans Price, of Billboard magazine reviewed the song favorably, saying that the production is "understated, with the words accented by piano and mandolin." She goes on to say that Dean "knows how to milk the sentiment from a potent lyric" and that he "turns in a solid performance."

== Music video ==
The music video was directed by Eric Welch/Peter Zavadil and premiered in mid-2004.

== Chart performance ==
"Let Them Be Little" debuted at number 51 on the U.S. Billboard Hot Country Singles & Tracks for the week of September 11, 2004.

| Chart (2004–2005) | Peak position |
|---|---|
| US Hot Country Songs (Billboard) | 8 |
| US Billboard Hot 100 | 68 |

=== Year-end charts ===
| Chart (2005) | Position |
|---|---|
| US Country Songs (Billboard) | 37 |
