= Only Here for a Little While =

Single by Billy Dean

from the album Young Man
- Released: November 11, 1990
- Genre: Country
- Length: 3:34
- Label: Capitol Nashville
- Songwriters: Wayland Holyfield; Richard Leigh
- Producers: Chuck Howard; Tom Shapiro

Billy Dean singles chronology
"Lowdown Lonely" (1990)	"Only Here for a Little While" (1990)	"Somewhere in My Broken Heart" (1991)

"Only Here for a Little While" is a song written by Wayland Holyfield and Richard Leigh, and recorded by American country music artist Billy Dean. It was released on November 11, 1990, as the second single from his debut album Young Man. The song spent 22 weeks on the Hot Country Songs charts, peaking at number three in early 1991.

== Music video ==
The music video was directed by Bill Young and premiered in late 1990.

== Chart performance ==
Chart (1990–1991)	Peak position
Canada Country Singles (RPM)	2
US Hot Country Songs (Billboard)	3

=== Year-end charts ===
Chart (1991)	Position
Canada Country Tracks (RPM)	7
US Country Songs (Billboard)	45
