= Men'll Be Boys =

Studio album by Billy Dean
- Released: June 14, 1994
- Studio: Emerald Sound Studios, Masterfonics, and Sound Stage Studios (Nashville, Tennessee)
- Genre: Country
- Length: 36:14
- Label: SBK, Liberty
- Producer: Jimmy Bowen Billy Dean Chuck Howard

Billy Dean chronology
Fire in the Dark (1993)	Men'll Be Boys (1994)	It's What I Do (1996)

Singles from Men'll Be Boys
- 1. "Cowboy Band" Released: June 4, 1994

Professional ratings
Review scores
Source	Rating
AllMusic	2.5/5 stars
Entertainment Weekly	C

Men'll Be Boys is the fourth studio album by American country music artist Billy Dean. It was released in 1994 on Liberty Records as his final album for the label before Liberty's country music division was merged with Capitol Records Nashville. The album produced only two singles in "Cowboy Band" and "Men Will Be Boys", which respectively reached #24 and #60 on the Billboard country singles chart.

The album includes two cover songs: "I Will Be Here" had been released by Steven Curtis Chapman on his 1989 album More to This Life, and "Misery and Gin" had been released by Merle Haggard on his 1980 album Back to the Barrooms.

== Track listing ==
No.	Title	Writer(s)	Length
1.	"Cowboy Band"	Jule Medders, Monty Powell	3:38
2.	"Wish You Were Here"	Tim Mensy, Tony Haselden	4:03
3.	"I Can't Find the Words to Say Goodbye"	Billy Dean, David Gates	3:27
4.	"Men Will Be Boys"	Guy Clark, Verlon Thompson	2:47
5.	"Pay Attention"	Suzi Ragsdale	3:38
6.	"Starting Over Again"	Dean, John Barlow Jarvis	4:11
7.	"Love and Bide"	Gates	3:10
8.	"Indian Head Penny"	Clark, Thompson	3:27
9.	"I Will Be Here"	Steven Curtis Chapman	3:35
10.	"Misery and Gin"	John Durrill, Snuff Garrett	3:55

== Credits ==
Album produced by Jimmy Bowen for Lynwood Productions and Billy Dean; "Starting Over Again" and "I Will Be Here" produced by Chuck Howard.

Musicians

- Billy Dean – lead vocals, electric guitars
- John Barlow Jarvis – acoustic piano
- Steve Nathan – synthesizers
- Matt Rollings – acoustic piano
- Michael Spriggs – acoustic guitars, gut string guitar
- Biff Watson – acoustic guitars
- John Willis – electric guitars
- Dan Dugmore – steel guitar
- Paul Franklin – steel guitar
- Glenn Worf – bass
- Lonnie Wilson – drums
- Terry McMillan – harmonica, percussion, congas, shaker, tambourine, cowbell, wind chimes
- Glen Duncan – fiddle
- Rob Hajacos – fiddle
- John Catchings – cello
- Kris Wilkinson – viola
- Eric Silver – violin

Background vocalists

- Michael Black
- Carol Chase
- Billy Dean
- Timothy Hedge
- Doc Hollister
- Cindy Richardson
- Harry Stinson
- Dennis Wilson
- Curtis Young

=== Production ===
- Stephen Tillisch – recording, additional recording
- Francis Buckley – additional recording, mixing
- Brian Hardin – recording assistant, additional recording assistant, mix assistant
- Glenn Meadows – digital editing, mastering
- Sherri Halford – creative director
- Butch Adams – photography
- Claudia Fowler – wardrobe
- Debra Wingo – hair, make-up

== Chart performance ==
Chart (1994)	Peak position
U.S. Billboard Top Country Albums	51
