= I Wanna Take Care of You =

Single by Billy Dean

from the album Fire in the Dark
- B-side: "I'm Not Built That Way"
- Released: March 29, 1993
- Genre: Country
- Length: 3:54
- Label: SBK/Liberty
- Songwriters: Billy Dean; J.K. Jones
- Producers: Jimmy Bowen; Billy Dean

Billy Dean singles chronology
"Tryin' to Hide a Fire in the Dark" (1992)	"I Wanna Take Care of You" (1993)	"I'm Not Built That Way" (1993)

"I Wanna Take Care of You" is a song co-written and recorded by American country music artist Billy Dean. It was released in March 1993 as the second single from Dean's album Fire in the Dark. The song reached number 22 on the Billboard Hot Country Singles & Tracks chart and number 9 on the Canadian RPM Country Tracks. It was written by Dean and J.K. Jones.

== Chart performance ==
Chart (1993)	Peak position
Canada Country Singles (RPM)	9
US Hot Country Songs (Billboard)	22

=== Year-end charts ===
Chart (1993)	Position
Canada Country Tracks (RPM)	92
