= I'll Get Over You =

Single by Crystal Gayle

from the album Somebody Loves You
- B-side: "High Time"
- Released: March 1976 (U.S.)
- Recorded: 1975
- Genre: Country
- Length: 3:33
- Label: United Artists 781
- Songwriter(s): Richard Leigh
- Producer(s): Allen Reynolds

Crystal Gayle singles chronology
"Somebody Loves You" (1975)	"I'll Get Over You" (1976)	"One More Time (Karneval)" (1976)

"I'll Get Over You" is a song written by Richard Leigh, and recorded by American country music artist Crystal Gayle. It was released in March 1976 as the second single from the album Somebody Loves You. The song was Gayle's seventh chart hit and her first number-one country hit in 1976.

== Background ==
In the mid-1970s, Gayle was trying to establish a recording career in country music. Gayle wanted to be on the level of her older sister Loretta Lynn. It was the help of her sister that helped produce Gayle's first single called "I've Cried the Blue Right Out of My Eyes."

However, it was the help of songwriter Richard Leigh who helped her gain control of her career. He wrote her first two big hits "Wrong Road Again" and "Somebody Loves You". In 1976, Gayle finally released "I'll Get Over You". The song became Gayle's first number-one hit, and the song made Gayle a household name.

That same year, "I'll Get Over You" was released on her 1976 album Somebody Loves You. "I'll Get Over You" remains as one of her best-known songs.

== Charts ==
=== Weekly charts ===
Chart (1976)	Peak position
US Hot Country Songs (Billboard)	1
US Billboard Hot 100	71
U.S. Billboard Easy Listening	40
Canadian RPM Country Tracks	2

=== Year-end charts ===
Chart (1976)	Position
US Hot Country Songs (Billboard)	4

== Other versions ==
- Two weeks before Crystal's version entered the Billboard Easy Listening chart in June 1976, a cover by actress Susan George hit the chart, peaking at No. 44.
