= Bob Luman =

American country and rockabilly singer (1937–1978)

- Born: Robert Glynn Luman; April 15, 1937; Blackjack, Texas, U.S.
- Origin: Nacogdoches, Texas
- Died: December 27, 1978 (aged 41) Nashville, Tennessee, U.S.
- Genres: Country, rockabilly
- Occupation: Singer
- Instruments: Vocals, guitar
- Years active: 1956–1978

Robert Glynn Luman (April 15, 1937 – December 27, 1978) was an American country and rockabilly singer.

== Early life and career ==
Luman was born in Blackjack, Texas, United States, and raised in Nacogdoches, Texas. His early interest in music was influenced by his father, an amateur fiddle, guitar, and harmonica player.

Bob Luman received his first guitar when he was 13 years of age. He attended high school in Kilgore, where the family had moved after young Bob's birth and started his first band while in high school. Luman had been a baseball star at his high school and tried out with the Major League Baseball Pittsburgh Pirates, but when he did not make it in professional baseball, he decided to concentrate on his music.

In 1956, he won a talent contest promoted by the Future Farmers of America, which earned him an appearance on the Louisiana Hayride. For the Hayride, Luman formed a backup band called the Shadows, including James Burton on guitar, James Kirkland on bass, and Butch White on drums. In 1957, the band signed with Imperial Records, where they recorded "All Night Long" (with B-side "Red Cadillac and a Black Mustache") and "Amarillo Blues". That same year, the band appeared on the Town Hall Party in Los Angeles, and in the movie Carnival Rock, where they backed up David Houston.

The following year, having been dropped by Imperial Records, Luman signed with Capitol Records, where he released "Try Me" and "I Know My Baby Cares". Capitol Records wanted Luman to change his name, which he refused to do, so he left the record label and signed with Warner Bros. Records, recording "Class of '59" and "Loretta".

In 1960, Luman was inducted into the United States Army. While still serving in the Army, Warner Bros. Records released Luman's best-known crossover hit, "Let's Think About Living", a novelty song that hit number seven on the Billboard Hot 100 chart and number nine on the Billboard country music chart. It also reached the top 10 in the UK Singles Chart.

After leaving the Army in 1962, Luman moved to Nashville. On August 12, 1964, he married Barbara in Yuma, Colorado. In 1965, he joined the Grand Ole Opry.

== Later career ==
Luman toured frequently in the 1960s and 1970s, and became popular in Las Vegas, with an act that combined country and rockabilly. He signed with Epic Records in 1968, and had several hits, including "Lonely Women Make Good Lovers" and "Still Loving You". "Lonely Women Make Good Lovers" became his biggest country hit, hitting number four on the country chart. (Steve Wariner, who had earlier been a member of Luman's band, later covered the song in 1984, and he, too, took it to number four on the country charts.)

Luman's other country hits included "Ain't Got Time to Be Unhappy", (1968) "Ballad of Two Brothers" (with Autry Inman, 1968), "When You Say Love" (1972), "Neither One of Us (Wants to Be the First to Say Goodbye)" (1973), "Proud of You Baby" (1975), and "The Pay Phone" (1977). Perhaps his most unusual song was a slow, soulful recitation of Johnny Cash's "I Still Miss Someone".

Luman died of lung cancer in Nashville on December 27, 1978. He was 41 years old. After his death, Bear Family Records released several compilations of his songs, including More of the Rocker, Still Rockin', and Carnival Rock.

== Legacy ==
Luman is a member of both the Rockabilly Hall of Fame and the Texas Country Music Hall of Fame.

His song "Lonely Women Make Good Lovers" was featured in the 1988 drama film Rain Man.

== Discography ==
=== Albums ===
| Year | Album | US Country | Label |
|---|---|---|---|
| 1960 | Let's Think About Living | | Warner Bros. |
| 1965 | Livin' Lovin' Sounds | | Hickory |
| 1968 | Ain't Got Time to Be Unhappy | | Epic |
| 1969 | Come On Home and Sing the Blues to Daddy | | Epic |
| 1970 | Gettin' Back to Norma | | Epic |
| 1971 | Is It Any Wonder That I Love You | | Epic |
| 1971 | Chain Don't Take to Me | | Epic |
| 1972 | When You Say Love | 38 | Epic |
| 1972 | Lonely Women Make Good Lovers | 10 | Epic |
| 1973 | Neither One of Us | 26 | Epic |
| 1974 | Bob Luman's Greatest Hits | 26 | Epic |
| 1974 | Still Loving You | 42 | Hickory/MGM |
| 1974 | Red Cadillac and Black Moustache | | Epic |
| 1976 | A Satisfied Mind | | Epic |
| 1977 | Alive and Well | | Epic |
| 1978 | Bob Luman | 49 | Polydor |

=== Singles ===
| Year | Single | Peak chart positions | | | | Album |
| Year | Single | US Country | US | CAN Country | AUS | Album |
|---|---|---|---|---|---|---|
| 1957 | "All Night Long" | | | | | |
| 1957 | "Red Cadillac and Black Mustache" | | | | | |
| 1959 | "My Baby Walks over Me" | — | — | — | — | —N/a |
| 1959 | "Dreamy Doll" | — | — | — | — | Let's Think About Living |
| 1960 | "Let's Think About Living" | 9 | 7 | — | 3 | Let's Think About Living |
| 1960 | "Why Why Bye Bye" | — | 106 | — | 43 | Let's Think About Living |
| 1960 | "Oh Lonesome Me" | — | 105 | — | — | Let's Think About Living |
| 1961 | "The Great Snow Man" / "The Pig Latin Song" (both written by John D. Loudermilk) | — | — | — | 62 | —N/a |
| 1961 | "Private Eye" | — | — | — | 58 | —N/a |
| 1962 | "Rocks of Reno" | — | — | — | — | —N/a |
| 1962 | "Belonging to You" | — | — | — | — | —N/a |
| 1962 | "Hey Joe" | — | — | — | — | —N/a |
| 1962 | "You're Everything" | — | — | — | — | —N/a |
| 1963 | "You're Welcome" | — | — | — | — | —N/a |
| 1963 | "I'm Gonna Write You a Song" | — | — | — | — | —N/a |
| 1963 | "I Like Your Kind of Love" (with Sue Thompson) | — | — | — | 26 | —N/a |
| | "Interstate Forty" | | | | | |
| 1964 | "The File" | 24 | — | — | — | Livin' Lovin' Sounds |
| 1964 | "Lonely Room" | — | — | — | — | —N/a |
| 1964 | "Fire Engine Red" | — | — | — | — | —N/a |
| 1966 | "Five Miles from Home (Soon I'll See Mary)" | 39 | — | — | — | —N/a |
| 1966 | "Poor Boy Blues" | 39 | — | — | — | —N/a |
| 1966 | "Come On and Sing" | 42 | — | — | — | —N/a |
| 1967 | "Hardly Anymore" | 59 | — | — | — | —N/a |
| 1967 | "If You Don't Love Me (Then Why Don't You Leave Me Alone)" | 61 | — | — | — | —N/a |
| 1967 | "Running Scared" | — | — | — | — | —N/a |
| 1968 | "Ain't Got Time to Be Unhappy" | 19 | — | 6 | — | Ain't Got Time to Be Unhappy |
| 1968 | "I Like Trains" | 50 | — | — | — | Come On Home and Sing the Blues to Daddy |
| 1968 | "Woman Without Love" | — | — | — | — | Come On Home and Sing the Blues to Daddy |
| 1969 | "Come On Home and Sing the Blues to Daddy" | 24 | — | — | — | Come On Home and Sing the Blues to Daddy |
| 1969 | "It's All Over (But the Shouting)" | 65 | — | — | — | —N/a |
| 1969 | "Every Day I Have to Cry Some" | 23 | — | — | — | Gettin' Back to Norma |
| 1969 | "The Gun" | 60 | — | 28 | — | Gettin' Back to Norma |
| 1970 | "Gettin' Back to Norma" | 56 | — | — | — | Gettin' Back to Norma |
| 1970 | "Still Loving You" | 56 | — | — | — | —N/a |
| 1970 | "Honky Tonk Man" | 22 | — | — | — | Is It Any Wonder That I Love You |
| 1970 | "What About the Hurt" | 44 | — | 37 | — | Is It Any Wonder That I Love You |
| 1971 | "Is It Any Wonder That I Love You" | 60 | — | — | — | Is It Any Wonder That I Love You |
| 1971 | "I Got a Woman" | 40 | — | 43 | — | Chain Don't Take to Me |
| 1971 | "A Chain Don't Take to Me" | 30 | — | — | — | Chain Don't Take to Me |
| 1972 | "When You Say Love" | 6 | — | 10 | — | When You Say Love |
| 1972 | "It Takes You" | 21 | — | 34 | — | Lonely Women Make Good Lovers |
| 1972 | "Lonely Women Make Good Lovers" | 4 | — | 4 | — | Lonely Women Make Good Lovers |
| 1973 | "Neither One of Us" | 7 | — | 17 | — | Neither One of Us |
| 1973 | "A Good Love Is Like a Good Song" | 23 | — | 43 | — | Neither One of Us |
| 1973 | "Still Loving You" (re-recording) | 7 | — | 29 | — | Bob Luman's Greatest Hits |
| 1974 | "Just Enough to Make Me Stay" | 23 | — | — | — | Bob Luman's Greatest Hits |
| 1974 | "Let Me Make the Bright Lights Shine for You" | 25 | — | — | — | Red Cadillac and Black Moustache |
| 1975 | "Proud of You Baby" | 22 | — | 38 | — | A Satisfied Mind |
| 1975 | "Shame on Me" | 48 | — | — | — | A Satisfied Mind |
| 1976 | "A Satisfied Mind" | 41 | — | — | — | A Satisfied Mind |
| 1976 | "The Man from Bowling Green" | 82 | — | — | — | A Satisfied Mind |
| 1976 | "How Do You Start Over" | 89 | — | — | — | A Satisfied Mind |
| 1976 | "Labor of Love" | 94 | — | — | — | Alive and Well |
| 1977 | "He's Got a Way with Women" | 63 | — | — | — | Alive and Well |
| 1977 | "I'm a Honky-Tonk Woman's Man" | 33 | — | — | — | Bob Luman |
| 1977 | "The Pay Phone" | 13 | — | — | — | Bob Luman |
| 1977 | "A Christmas Tribute" | 92 | — | — | — | —N/a |
| 1978 | "Proud Lady" | 47 | — | — | — | Bob Luman |
