= It's What I Do =

Studio album by Billy Dean
- Released: April 2, 1996
- Studio: Dark Horse Recording (Franklin, Tennessee); Javelina Studios, Sound Stage Studios and Woodland Sound Studios (Nashville, Tennessee)
- Genre: Country
- Length: 37:15
- Label: Capitol Nashville
- Producer: Tom Shapiro

Billy Dean chronology
Men'll Be Boys (1994)	It's What I Do (1996)	Real Man (1998)

Singles from It's What I Do
- 1. "It's What I Do" Released: January 8, 1996; 2. "That Girl's Been Spyin' on Me" Released: June 10, 1996; 3. "I Wouldn't Be a Man" Released: October 21, 1996

Professional ratings
Review scores
Source	Rating
AllMusic	2/5 stars

It's What I Do is the fifth studio album by American country music artist Billy Dean. It was his first album since Men'll Be Boys two years previous. This was also his first release for Capitol Records Nashville, as the Nashville division of Liberty Records had been merged into Capitol. The album produced three singles: the title track at #5, followed by "That Girl's Been Spyin' on Me" at #4 and "I Wouldn't Be a Man" at #45. (The latter was originally a Top Ten country hit for Don Williams, in 1987 and later again for Josh Turner in 2010.) The album also reunited him with Tom Shapiro, who had co-produced his first two albums.

== Track listing ==
It's What I Do track listing
No.	Title	Writer(s)	Length
1.	"It's What I Do"	Tom Shapiro, Chuck Jones	3:22
2.	"That Girl's Been Spyin' on Me"	Shapiro, Max T. Barnes	3:44
3.	"In the Name of Love"	Skip Ewing, Doug Stone	3:39
4.	"Down to Your Last One More"	Gary Burr	3:13
5.	"I Wouldn't Be a Man"	Mike Reid, Rory Bourke	4:24
6.	"When Our Backs Are Against the Wall"	Billy Dean, Tim Nichols	4:01
7.	"Play Something We Can Dance To"	Dean, Dennis Morgan	4:04
8.	"The Mountain Moved"	Bob Regan, George Teren	2:53
9.	"Don't Threaten Me with a Good Time"	Kostas, Bobby Boyd, Don Mealer	3:14
10.	"Leavin' Line"	Pam Rose, Mary Ann Kennedy, Pat Bunch	4:41

== Personnel ==
- Billy Dean – lead vocals, backing vocals
- Steve Nathan – keyboards
- Carl Marsh – synth strings, synth string arrangements
- Tom Shapiro – synth string arrangements
- Larry Byrom – acoustic guitar
- Brent Rowan – acoustic guitar, electric guitars
- Biff Watson – acoustic guitar
- Bruce Bouton – lap steel guitar
- Paul Franklin – steel guitar, dobro
- Glenn Worf – bass
- Eddie Bayers – drums, percussion
- Terry McMillan – shaker, tambourine, cowbell, harmonica
- Joe Spivey – fiddle, mandolin
- Jonathan Yudkin – fiddle
- Linda Davis – backing vocals
- Thom Flora – backing vocals
- Nicol Smith – backing vocals
- Tina Clark-Vallejo – backing vocals
- Curtis Wright – backing vocals
- Curtis Young – backing vocals

=== Production ===
- Tom Shapiro – producer
- Brian Tankersley – recording, additional recording, mixing
- John Kunz – recording assistant, additional recording assistant, mix assistant, additional mix engineer, project coordinator
- Greg Parker – recording assistant
- Sandy Jenkins – mix assistant
- Eric Legg – additional mix engineer
- Hank Williams – mastering at MasterMix (Nashville, Tennessee)
- Nancy H. Williams – production manager
- Cindy Owen – art direction, design
- Mark Tucker – photography
- Sandi Spika – stylist
- Mary Beth Felts – hair, make-up
- Narvel Blackstock with Starstruck Entertainment – management

== Charts ==
Chart (1996)	Peak position
US Billboard 200	143
US Top Country Albums (Billboard)	18
