= That Girl's Been Spyin' on Me =

1996 single by Billy Dean

Single by Billy Dean

from the album It's What I Do
- B-side: "Don't Threaten Me with a Good Time"
- Released: June 10, 1996
- Genre: Country
- Length: 3:44
- Label: Capitol Nashville #58563
- Songwriters: Tom Shapiro; Max T. Barnes
- Producers: Tom Shapiro; Nancy H. Williams

Billy Dean singles chronology
"It's What I Do" (1996)	"That Girl's Been Spyin' on Me" (1996)	"I Wouldn't Be a Man" (1996)

"That Girl's Been Spyin' on Me" is a song written by Tom Shapiro and Max T. Barnes, and recorded by American country music singer Billy Dean. It was released in June 1996 as the second single from his album It's What I Do. The song spent twenty weeks on the Hot Country Songs charts in 1996, peaking at number four.

== Critical reception ==
Deborah Evans Price, of Billboard magazine reviewed the song favorably, saying that the "cloak-and-dagger spy intro gives way to tasty guitar, piano, and fiddle licks that percolate nicely." She goes on to say that the writers provide Dean with a "catchy melody and cute lyric, to which he adds a playful vocal delivery."

== Chart positions ==
"That Girl's Been Spyin' on Me" debuted at number 72 on the U.S. Billboard Hot Country Singles & Tracks for the week of June 15, 1996.

Chart (1996)	Peak position
Canada Country Singles (RPM)	3
US Hot Country Songs (Billboard)	4

=== Year-end charts ===
Chart (1996)	Position
Canada Country Tracks (RPM)	44
US Country Songs (Billboard)	60
