= You Don't Count the Cost =

Single by Billy Dean

from the album Billy Dean
- B-side: "She's Taken"
- Released: September 9, 1991
- Genre: Country
- Length: 3:19
- Label: Capitol Nashville
- Songwriters: Tom Shapiro, Chris Waters, Bucky Jones
- Producers: Tom Shapiro, Chuck Howard

Billy Dean singles chronology
"Somewhere in My Broken Heart" (1991)	"You Don't Count the Cost" (1991)	"Only the Wind" (1991)

"You Don't Count the Cost" is a song written by Tom Shapiro, Chris Waters and Bucky Jones, and originally recorded by American country music artist Ricky Skaggs on his 1991 album My Father's Son. The song was recorded later that year by American country music artist Billy Dean. It was released in September 1991 as the lead single from his self-titled album. Dean's version reached number 4 on the Billboard Hot Country Singles & Tracks chart.

== Chart performance ==
Chart (1991)	Peak position
Canada Country Singles (RPM)	3
US Hot Country Songs (Billboard)	4

=== Year-end charts ===
Chart (1991)	Position
Canada Country Tracks (RPM)	71
