= Only the Wind (song) =

Single by Billy Dean

from the album Billy Dean
- B-side: "Simple Things"
- Released: December 30, 1991
- Genre: Country
- Length: 3:40
- Label: Capitol Nashville #44803
- Songwriters: Tom Shapiro; Chuck Jones
- Producers: Chuck Howard; Tom Shapiro

Billy Dean singles chronology
"You Don't Count the Cost" (1991)	"Only the Wind" (1991)	"Billy the Kid" (1992)

"Only the Wind" is a song written by Tom Shapiro and Chuck Jones, and recorded by the American country music artist Billy Dean. It was released in December 1991 as the second single from his self-titled album. The song spent 20 weeks on the Hot Country Songs charts in 1992, peaking at number four.

== Content ==
The song uses an analogy of a common childhood fear of a windstorm to frame a young man's failing relationship with a woman. Here, the protagonist recalls being comforted by his mother while a gusting, howling wind smacks the screen door and causes him to be frightened. The scene then shifts to the present, where he reveals his relationship difficulties and a fight that causes the woman to leave. Upon hearing the screen door slam shut, he remembers his childhood and wishes aloud that her leaving is just temporary ("It's only the wind, and nothing more/not the end of my world, walking out the door"), knowing that, in this case, he has no one to comfort him.

== Music video ==
The music video was directed by Bill Young and was premiered in early 1992.

== Chart positions ==
Chart (1991–1992)	Peak position
Canada Country Singles (RPM)	3
US Adult Contemporary (Billboard)	48
US Hot Country Songs (Billboard)	4

=== Year-end charts ===
Chart (1992)	Position
Canada Country Tracks (RPM)	37
US Country Songs (Billboard)	56
