= Tryin' to Hide a Fire in the Dark =

Single by Billy Dean

from the album Fire in the Dark
- B-side: "Steam Roller"
- Released: November 30, 1992
- Genre: Country
- Length: 3:37
- Label: SBK/Liberty
- Songwriters: Billy Dean; Tim Nichols
- Producers: Jimmy Bowen; Billy Dean

Billy Dean singles chronology
| "If There Hadn't Been You" (1992) | "Tryin' to Hide a Fire in the Dark" (1992) | "I Wanna Take Care of You" (1993) |

"Tryin' to Hide a Fire in the Dark" is a song co-written and recorded by American country music artist Billy Dean. It was released in November 1992 as the lead single and title track from Dean's album Fire in the Dark. The song reached No. 6 on the Billboard Hot Country Singles & Tracks chart in March 1993 and No. 1 on the RPM Country Tracks chart in Canada. It was written by Dean and Tim Nichols.

== Music video ==
The music video was directed by Bill Young and premiered in late 1992.

== Chart performance ==
| Chart (1992–1993) | Peak position |
|---|---|
| Canada Country Singles (RPM) | 1 |
| US Hot Country Songs (Billboard) | 6 |

=== Year-end charts ===
| Chart (1993) | Position |
|---|---|
| Canada Country Tracks (RPM) | 19 |
