= If There Hadn't Been You =

Single by Billy Dean

from the album Billy Dean
- B-side: "Small Favors"
- Released: August 17, 1992
- Genre: Country
- Length: 3:19
- Label: Capitol Nashville
- Songwriters: Tom Shapiro; Ron Hellard
- Producers: Chuck Howard; Tom Shapiro

Billy Dean singles chronology
| "Billy the Kid" (1992) | "If There Hadn't Been You" (1992) | "Tryin' to Hide a Fire in the Dark" (1992) |

"If There Hadn't Been You" is a song written by Tom Shapiro and Ron Hellard, and recorded by American country music artist Billy Dean. It was released in August 1992 as the fourth and final single from Dean's 1991 self-titled album. The song reached number 3 on the Billboard Hot Country Singles & Tracks chart in November 1992 and number 1 on the RPM Country Tracks chart in Canada the following month.

== Music video ==
The music video was directed by Roger Pistole and premiered in mid-1992. Filmed at the Majestic Theatre on Broadway in New York City, it features Dean performing both outside and inside the theater, both on stage and on a balcony, as well as in the parking garage of the theater.

== Chart performance ==
| Chart (1992) | Peak position |
|---|---|
| Canada Country Singles (RPM) | 1 |
| US Adult Contemporary (Billboard) | 39 |
| US Hot Country Songs (Billboard) | 3 |

=== Year-end charts ===
| Chart (1992) | Position |
|---|---|
| Canada Country Tracks (RPM) | 49 |
