= Fire in the Dark =

Studio album by Billy Dean
- Released: January 26, 1993
- Recorded: 1992
- Studio: Emerald Sound Studios (Nashville, Tennessee)
- Genre: Country
- Length: 35:53
- Label: SBK/Liberty
- Producer: Jimmy Bowen Billy Dean

Billy Dean chronology
Billy Dean (1991)	Fire in the Dark (1993)	Greatest Hits (1994)

Singles from Fire in the Dark
- 1. "Tryin' to Hide a Fire in the Dark" Released: November 30, 1992; 2. "I Wanna Take Care of You" Released: March 29, 1993; 3. "I'm Not Built That Way" Released: August 21, 1993; 4. "We Just Disagree" Released: November 1, 1993

Professional ratings
Review scores
Source	Rating
AllMusic	3/5 stars
Entertainment Weekly	C

Fire in the Dark is the third studio album by American country music artist Billy Dean. It was released in 1993 on SBK/Liberty Records and like his previous two albums, it was certified gold by the RIAA. Unlike his first two albums, which were produced by Tom Shapiro, this one was produced by Liberty Records' then-president Jimmy Bowen, with Dean as co-producer. Singles from this album include "Tryin' to Hide a Fire in the Dark", "I Wanna Take Care of You", "I'm Not Built That Way" and a cover of Dave Mason's No. 12 1977 pop hit "We Just Disagree". Also covered here is James Taylor's "Steamroller Blues". Of these singles, "Tryin' to Hide a Fire in the Dark" and "We Just Disagree" were both top ten hits on the country music chart.

== Track listing ==
Fire in the Dark track listing
No.	Title	Writer(s)	Length
1.	"Tryin' to Hide a Fire in the Dark"	Billy Dean, Tim Nichols	3:37
2.	"When a Woman Cries"	Joshua Kadison	3:46
3.	"That's What I Like About Love"	Mark D. Sanders, Verlon Thompson	3:30
4.	"I Wanna Take Care of You"	Dean, J.K. Jones	3:54
5.	"Only a Woman Knows"	Billy Henderson, Steven Dale Jones	2:48
6.	"We Just Disagree"	Jim Krueger	3:24
7.	"Two of the Lucky Ones"	Dean, Nichols	2:59
8.	"I'm Not Built That Way"	Don Pfrimmer, George Teren	2:52
9.	"Give Me All the Pieces"	Chuck Jones, Chris Waters	3:26
10.	"Steamroller"	James Taylor	5:37

== Personnel ==
- Billy Dean – vocals
- John Barlow Jarvis – keyboards, synthesizers
- Biff Watson – synthesizers, acoustic guitars
- Chris Leuzinger – electric guitars
- Dan Mahar – electric guitars
- John Willis – electric guitars
- Dan Dugmore – dobro, steel guitar
- John Rich – steel guitar
- Glenn Worf – bass
- Lonnie Wilson – drums, bells, ride cymbal, percussion
- Kirk "Jelly Roll" Johnson – harmonica
- Vicki Hampton – backing vocals
- Donna McElroy – backing vocals
- Cindy Richardson Walker – backing vocals
- Dennis Wilson – backing vocals
- Curtis Young – backing vocals

=== Production ===
- Jimmy Gilmer – executive producer
- Jimmy Bowen – producer
- Billy Dean – producer
- Bob Bullock – digital recording, digital mixing, overdub recording
- Tim Kish – overdub recording
- Brian Hardin – recording assistant, mix assistant, overdub assistant
- Milan Bogdan – digital editing
- Glenn Meadows – digital editing, mastering
- Masterfonics (Nashville, Tennessee) – editing and mastering location
- Sherri Halford – creative director
- Buddy Jackson – art direction
- Sam Knight – design
- Randee St. Nicholas – photography
- Claudia McConnell – stylist
- Vanessa Ware – stylist
- June Arnold – hair, make-up
- Teri Brown and TBA Management Group – management

== Charts ==
Chart (1993)	Peak position
US Billboard 200	83
US Top Country Albums (Billboard)	14
Canadian RPM Country Albums	4
