= Somewhere in My Broken Heart =

Single by Billy Dean

from the album Young Man
- B-side: "Young Man"
- Released: May 4, 1991
- Genre: Country
- Length: 3:19
- Label: Capitol Nashville
- Songwriters: Billy Dean, Richard Leigh
- Producers: Tom Shapiro, Chuck Howard

Billy Dean singles chronology
"Only Here for a Little While" (1990)	"Somewhere in My Broken Heart" (1991)	"You Don't Count the Cost" (1991)

"Somewhere in My Broken Heart" is a song written by American country music artist Billy Dean and Richard Leigh. Randy Travis first recorded the song on his 1989 album No Holdin' Back. Two years later, it was released as the third single from Dean's album Young Man and reached number 3 on the Billboard Hot Country Singles & Tracks chart.

The song earned Billy a Grammy nomination for Best Male Country Vocal Performance, as well as winning the Academy of Country Music Award for Song of the Year.

== Music video ==
The music video was directed by Bill Young and premiered in mid-1991, co-starring Margie Lazo.

== Chart performance ==
Chart (1991)	Peak position
Canada Adult Contemporary (RPM)	18
Canada Country Singles (RPM)	2
US Adult Contemporary (Billboard)	18
US Hot Country Songs (Billboard)	3

=== Year-end charts ===
Chart (1991)	Position
Canada Country Tracks (RPM)	9
US Country Songs (Billboard)	21
