= Billy the Kid (song) =

Single by Billy Dean

from the album Billy Dean
- B-side: "Simple Things"
- Released: May 18, 1992
- Recorded: 1991
- Genre: Country
- Length: 3:09
- Label: Capitol Nashville #57745
- Songwriters: Billy Dean; Paul Nelson
- Producers: Chuck Howard; Tom Shapiro

Billy Dean singles chronology
"Only the Wind" (1991)	"Billy the Kid" (1992)	"If There Hadn't Been You" (1992)

"Billy the Kid" is a song co-written and recorded by American country music singer Billy Dean. It was released in May 1992 as the third single from his 1991 self-titled album. The song spent twenty weeks on the Hot Country Songs chart in 1992, peaking at number four. The song was written by Dean and Paul Nelson.

== Music video ==
The music video was directed by Bill Young and premiered in May 1992. At the beginning, the music from Dean's previous song, "Only the Wind" is heard.

== Chart positions ==
"Billy the Kid" debuted at number 60 on the U.S. Billboard Hot Country Singles & Tracks for the week of May 23, 1992.

Chart (1992)	Peak position
Canada Country Singles (RPM)	3
US Hot Country Songs (Billboard)	4

=== Year-end charts ===
Chart (1992)	Position
Canada Country Tracks (RPM)	44
US Country Songs (Billboard)	40
