= Billy Dean =

American country music singer-songwriter (born 1962)

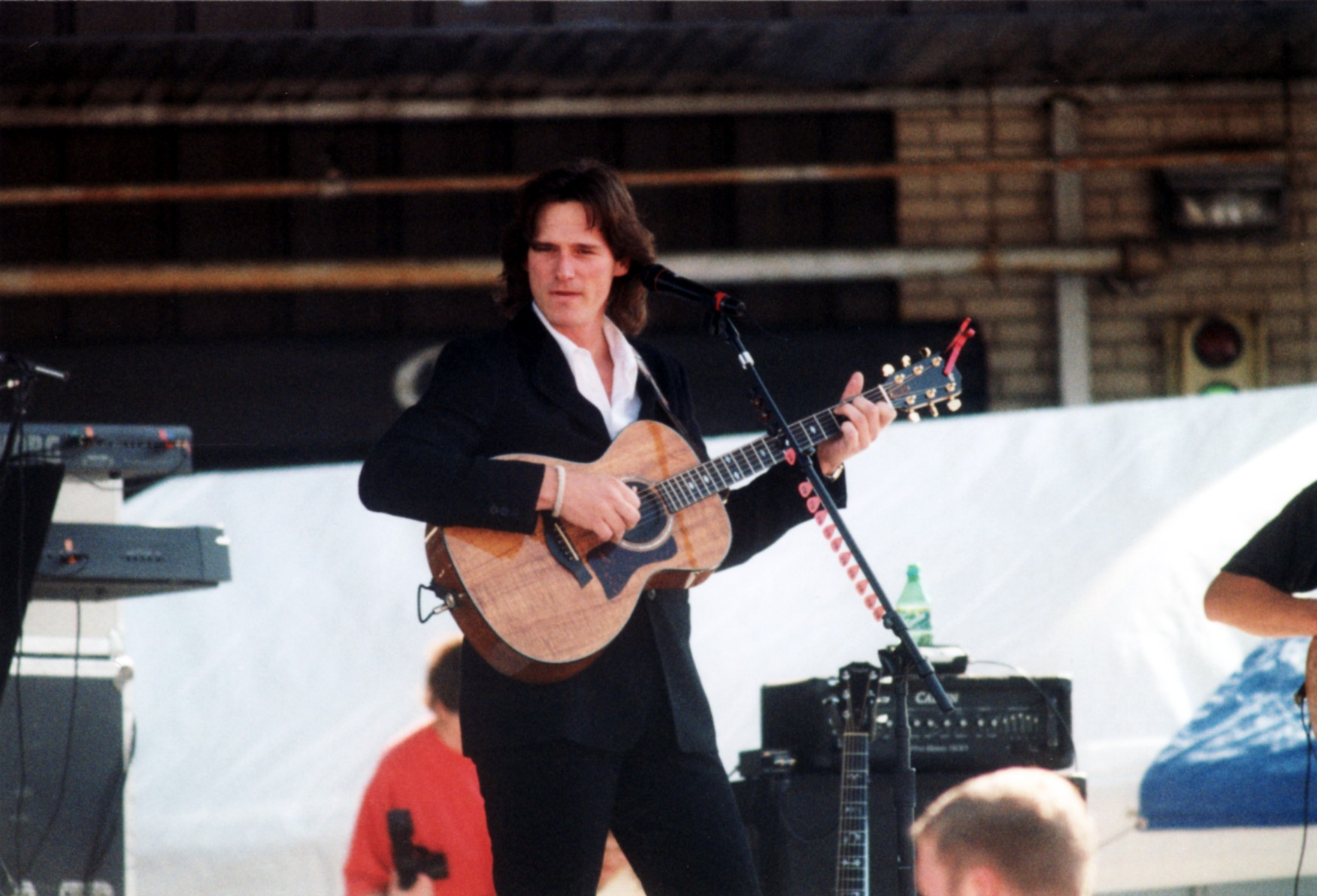
- Dean performing at the Country For Kids concert in 1998 in Stafford, Virginia

Background information
- Born: William Harold Dean Jr. April 2, 1962 (age 64); Quincy, Florida, United States
- Genres: Country
- Occupations: Musician, songwriter, actor
- Instruments: Vocals, guitar, fiddle, banjo
- Years active: 1989–present
- Labels: SBK/Liberty, Capitol Nashville, Dreamcatcher, View 2, Curb
- Website: billydean.com

William Harold Dean Jr. (born April 2, 1962) is an American country music singer and songwriter.

He first gained national attention after appearing on the television talent competition Star Search. Active as a recording artist since 1990, he has recorded a total of eight studio albums (of which the first three have been certified gold by the RIAA) and a greatest hits package which is also certified gold. His studio albums have accounted for more than 20 hit singles on the Billboard country charts, including 11 Top Ten hits.

In 2000, he had a Billboard Number one as a guest artist along with Alison Krauss on Kenny Rogers' "Buy Me a Rose", and had two Number Ones on the RPM country charts in Canada.

== Biography ==
Dean was born in Quincy, Florida, on April 2, 1962. His father, also known as Billy Dean, maintained a band called The Country Rocks in his spare time. By the age of 8, Dean began playing in his father's band. Throughout high school, at Robert F. Munroe Day School, he continued to play music, both in his father's band and with other local musicians. He soon began touring in local clubs, and sang Frank Sinatra's "My Way" at his high school graduation.

Dean was also a basketball player in high school, and was offered a scholarship to East Central Community College in Decatur, Mississippi. He attended college for one year before dropping out in order to pursue his desired career in music. By the time he was 20, Dean made the finals on the Wrangler Country Star Search, followed by a Male Vocalist win on the television competition Star Search six years later. He also worked as a demo singer and took acting lessons, appearing in television commercials for McDonald's, Chevrolet and Valvoline. By the end of the decade, he had signed to a publishing contract with EMI Music, as well as a recording contract with SBK Records, a subsidiary of Liberty Records.

== Musical career ==
=== 1990–1995 ===
Dean's first single was "Lowdown Lonely", which did not enter the charts. It was followed by "Only Here for a Little While", the second release from his debut album Young Man. This song and its follow-up, "Somewhere in My Broken Heart" (previously recorded by Randy Travis on his 1989 album No Holdin' Back) were both No. 3 hits on the Billboard country charts. The latter was also a minor hit on the Hot Adult Contemporary Tracks charts. Young Man was certified gold by the RIAA.

Dean's self-titled second album followed in 1991, and soon earned a gold certification as well. Four singles were released from it: "You Don't Count the Cost", "Only the Wind" and "Billy the Kid" each peaked at No. 4 on the country charts, while "If There Hadn't Been You" was a No. 3 on Billboard, and a No. 1 on both the former Radio & Records (now Mediabase) country charts in the U.S. and the RPM Country Tracks charts in Canada.

Dean toured with The Judds on their farewell tour in 1991, he also toured with Wynonna Judd and Clint Black. He wrote and recorded the theme song to the ABC animated television series Wild West C.O.W.-Boys of Moo Mesa, and hosted a Top 21 countdown on VH1. In 1992, he earned the Top New Male Vocalist award and the Song of the Year award for "Somewhere in My Broken Heart" from the Academy of Country Music.

Fire in the Dark was the title of Dean's third album. Issued in 1993, it was his third straight gold-certified album, earning that certification from both the RIAA and CRIA.His lead-off single "Tryin' to Hide a Fire in the Dark" peaked at No. 6 in the United States and became his second No. 1 in Canada. Following it were "I Wanna Take Care of You", "I'm Not Built That Way", and a cover of Dave Mason's 1977 pop hit "We Just Disagree". Also in 1993, Dean had an opening slot on Alan Jackson's tour.

Following his first three studio albums was a greatest hits album in 1994. This album reprised his first nine singles, as well as a new song, "Once in a While", which Dean wrote and recorded for the soundtrack to the 1994 film 8 Seconds. This song peaked at No. 53 based on unsolicited airplay.

Men'll Be Boys, his final release for SBK/Liberty, came later in 1994. This album was not as successful in sales or chart performance, producing the No. 24 "Cowboy Band" and No. 60 title track. After this album, Dean placed his career on hiatus to raise his children.

=== 1996–present ===
Dean returned to the recording studio in 1996 for his fifth album, It's What I Do, on Capitol Records Nashville. This album returned him to the Top Ten with its title track and "That Girl's Been Spyin' on Me", which reached numbers 5 and 4, respectively. The final single, a cover of Don Williams' 1988 single "I Wouldn't Be a Man", fell short of Top 40. He also worked with actress and singer Crystal Bernard on her 1996 debut album Girl Next Door, in addition to co-writing its debut single "Have We Forgotten What Love Is." Later that year, Dean released a non-charting single, "In the Name of Love", which never appeared on an album. In 1998, Victoria Shaw and several other artists, including Dean, collaborated on the charity single "One Heart at a Time".

Real Man, his sixth album, was issued in mid-1998. This album produced only one Top 40 hit in its title track, followed by "Innocent Bystander" which reached number 68. After this album, Dean exited Capitol's roster. He also took up acting once more, appearing in the minor TV specials A Face to Kill For and Blue Valley Songbird. In 2000, he and Alison Krauss made guest appearances on Kenny Rogers' single "Buy Me a Rose", which reached the top of the Billboard country charts in May of that year. This song was also a Top 40 hit on the Billboard Hot 100, and Rogers' first number 1 single in thirteen years.

A year later, Dean joined Suzy Bogguss and 12-year-old singer Jillian on "Please Keep Mom and Dad in Love," which was issued on Rogers's Dreamcatcher Records, and never included on an album. Although he continued touring, he did not chart again until 2003 with "I'm in Love With You", released on the independent View 2 label. His next release for View 2 was a cover of John Denver's "Thank God I'm a Country Boy". Curb Records took over promotion of this single shortly after its release, and by mid-2004 it reached number 27 on the country charts. Following it was the single "Let Them Be Little", co-written by Richie McDonald of Lonestar and recorded by the band on its 2004 album Let's Be Us Again. Dean's seventh studio album, also titled Let Them Be Little, was finally issued in late 2004 on Curb. Although "Let Them Be Little" reached a peak of number 8 on the country charts in early 2005, the album's other singles all failed to reach Top 40. A Christmas music album, The Christ (A Song for Joseph), followed in late 2005. Included on the album was a duet with his daughter.

In addition to recording and touring, Dean is branching into using music for corporate marketing. One of his ventures, Song Sessions, combines songwriting and corporate team building exercises.

Billy took over the lead role (formerly played by Kenny Rogers), playing Hank Longley, in "The Toy Shoppe" (a musical written by Kenny Rogers and Kelly Junkerman) at the Starlite Theater in Branson, Missouri, through the end of 2013.

== Awards and nominations ==
=== Grammy Awards ===
Year	Nominee / work	Award	Result
1992	"Somewhere in My Broken Heart"	Best Male Country Vocal Performance	Nominated

=== American Music Awards ===
Year	Nominee / work	Award	Result
1992	Billy Dean	Favorite Country New Artist	Nominated

=== TNN/Music City News Country Awards ===
Year	Nominee / work	Award	Result
1993	Billy Dean	Star of Tomorrow	Nominated

=== Academy of Country Music Awards ===
Year	Nominee / work	Award	Result
1992	Billy Dean	Top New Male Vocalist	Won
1992	"Somewhere in My Broken Heart"	Song of the Year	Won
1993	Billy Dean	Top Male Vocalist of the Year	Nominated
2001	"Buy Me a Rose"^{[A]}	Top Vocal Event of the Year	Nominated

=== Country Music Association Awards ===
Year	Nominee / work	Award	Result
1992	Billy Dean	Horizon Award	Nominated
1994	Common Thread: The Songs of the Eagles	Album of the Year	Won

^[A] Nominated alongside Alison Krauss and Kenny Rogers

== Politics ==
In January 2024, Dean released "Never Back Down," a single "inspired" by Ron DeSantis. The song's name is the same as one super PAC of DeSantis's.
