= Richard Leigh (songwriter) =

American singer-songwriter (born 1951)

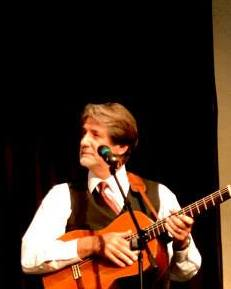
- Leigh performing with Tim Kaine in 2013

Background information
- Born: May 26, 1951 (age 74); Washington, D.C., United States
- Occupations: Musician, songwriter
- Website: richardleigh.com

Richard Leigh (born May 26, 1951 in Washington, D.C.) is an American country music songwriter and singer. He is best known for penning "Don't It Make My Brown Eyes Blue", sung by Crystal Gayle. In 1978, he received a Grammy Award for "Best Country Song" for the popular song. It was nominated in both pop and country categories, and reached number one on both charts.

== Early life ==
He was two and a half years old when his parents were killed in an accident. After living with various family members, he was taken in by the ex-wife of his half-brother at the age of eight and a half; when he was 15, she legally adopted him. He began writing songs when he was 10.

He is a graduate of Virginia Highlands Community College (VHCC) and Virginia Commonwealth University. It was while he was attending the latter school that he penned and first sang "I'll Get Over You", while performing at the Crossroads Coffeehouse in Richmond, Virginia's Fan District. He eventually decided his true calling was singing and songwriting. He moved to Nashville in pursuit of his dream in 1974.

== Career ==
In two years, he achieved success with his first number one song, "I'll Get Over You" (1976), performed by Crystal Gayle. In 1978, he won the Grammy Award for Best Country Song with "Don't It Make My Brown Eyes Blue", again sung by Gayle. He was also nominated for "The Greatest Man I Never Knew", co-written with Layng Martine Jr. Other prominent singers who have brought his songs number one status over the years include Billy Dean, Mickey Gilley, Reba McEntire, Barbara Mandrell, Steve Wariner, and Don Williams. Kathy Mattea had another number one hit in 1990 with "Come from the Heart", co-written with Susanna Clark. In 1999, the Dixie Chicks recorded Leigh's "Cold Day in July" for their album Fly, reaching number 10 on the country music charts in 2000. In total, he was written or co-written eight number one songs and 14 that made it to the top ten.

He has been nominated for songwriter of the year seven times and in 1994 he was inducted into the Nashville Songwriters Foundation Nashville Songwriters Hall of Fame. On April 11, 2011, Leigh was one of only four chosen nationally from the American Community College System to be awarded 2011 AACC Outstanding Alumni Award for excellence in one's chosen field. Since 2013 he has arranged with VHCC to host the Richard Leigh Songwriter's Festival, an annual competition for new songwriting talent. Proceeds from the event go to VHCC's Great Expectations program benefiting foster care students.

Leigh was raised in Virginia, and lives in Tennessee.

== List of number one songs ==
Number ones on Billboard's US Country Music Chart unless otherwise noted.

Year	Title	Co-writer	Performer
1976	"I'll Get Over You"	None	Crystal Gayle
1978	"Don't It Make My Brown Eyes Blue"	None	Crystal Gayle
1985	"Life's Highway"	R. Leigh/ R. Murrah	Steve Wariner
1982	"Put Your Dreams Away"	R. Leigh/W. Holyfield	Mickey Gilley
1990	"Come From the Heart"	R. Leigh/S. Clark	Kathy Mattea
1991	"Somewhere in My Broken Heart"^{A}	R. Leigh/B. Dean	Billy Dean
1991	"Only Here for a Little While"^{A}	R. Leigh/W. Holyfield	Billy Dean
1984	"That's the Thing About Love"	R. Leigh/G. Nicholson	Don Williams
1992	"The Greatest Man I Never Knew"^{A}	R. Leigh/L. Martine, Jr.	Reba McEntire

- ^{A}Reached No. 1 on U.S. Radio & Records country singles charts.

== Awards and nominations ==
=== Grammy Awards ===
Year	Nominee / work	Award	Result
1978	"Don't It Make My Brown Eyes Blue"	Best Country Song	Won
1978	"Don't It Make My Brown Eyes Blue"	Song of the Year	Nominated
1993	"The Greatest Man I Never Knew"^{[A]}	Best Country Song	Nominated

=== Academy of Country Music Awards ===
Year	Nominee / work	Award	Result
1978	"Don't It Make My Brown Eyes Blue"	Song of the Year	Nominated
1992	"Somewhere in My Broken Heart"^{[B]}	Song of the Year	Won

=== Country Music Association Awards ===
Year	Nominee / work	Award	Result
1976	"I'll Get Over You"	Song of the Year	Nominated
1978	"Don't It Make My Brown Eyes Blue"	Song of the Year	Won

^[A]Nominated alongside co-writer Layng Martine Jr.
^[B]Nominated alongside co-writer Billy Dean
